= List of flag bearers for Chinese Taipei at the Olympics =

Chinese Taipei at the Olympics
- Chinese Taipei Olympic flag
- IOC code: TPE
- NOC: Chinese Taipei Olympic Committee(Taiwan)
- Website: www.tpenoc.net (in Chinese and English)
- Medals: Gold 9 Silver 11 Bronze 23 Total 43

Summer appearances
- 1956; 1960; 1964; 1968; 1972; 1976–1980; 1984; 1988; 1992; 1996; 2000; 2004; 2008; 2012; 2016; 2020; 2024; 2028

Winter appearances
- 1972; 1976; 1980; 1984; 1988; 1992; 1994; 1998; 2002; 2006; 2010; 2014; 2018; 2022; 2026

Other related appearances
- Republic of China (1924–1948)

This is a list of flag bearers who have represented Chinese Taipei at the Olympics.

Flag bearers carry the national flag of their country at the opening ceremony of the Olympic Games.

#	Event year	Season	National flag	Flag bearer	Sport
1	1964	Summer	(Taiwan)	Wu Ah-min	Athletics
2	1972	Winter	(Taiwan)	Chia Kuo-liang	Alpine skiing
3	1972	Summer	(Taiwan)	Chi Cheng	Athletics
4	1976	Winter	(Taiwan)	Chen Yun-ming	Alpine skiing
5	1984	Winter	(Chinese Taipei)	Ueng Ming-yih	Biathlon / Cross-country skiing
3	1984	Summer	(Chinese Taipei)	Lee Fu-an	Athletics
4	1988	Winter	(Chinese Taipei)	Chen Chin-san	Bobsleigh
5	1988	Summer	(Chinese Taipei)	Lee Fu-an	Athletics
6	1992	Summer	(Chinese Taipei)	Wang Kuang-shih	Baseball
7	1994	Winter	(Chinese Taipei)	Sun Kuang-ming	Bobsleigh
8	1996	Summer	(Chinese Taipei)	Tu Tsai-hsing	Shooting
9	1998	Winter	(Chinese Taipei)	Sun Kuang-ming	Bobsleigh
10	2000	Summer	(Chinese Taipei)	Chiang Peng-lung	Table tennis
11	2002	Winter	(Chinese Taipei)	Lin Chui-bin	Luge
12	2004	Summer	(Chinese Taipei)	Chen Chih-yuan	Baseball
13	2006	Winter	(Chinese Taipei)	Ma Chih-hung	Luge
14	2008	Summer	(Chinese Taipei)	Lai Sheng-jung	Softball
15	2010	Winter	(Chinese Taipei)	Ma Chih-hung	Luge
16	2012	Summer	(Chinese Taipei)	Chen Shih-chieh	Weightlifting
17	2014	Winter	(Chinese Taipei)	Sung Ching-yang	Speed skating
18	2016	Summer	(Chinese Taipei)	Wong I-sheau	Equestrian
19	2018	Winter	(Chinese Taipei)	Lien Te-an	Luge
20	2020	Summer	(Chinese Taipei)	Kuo Hsing-chun	Weightlifting
20	2020	Summer	(Chinese Taipei)	Lu Yen-hsun	Tennis
21	2022	Winter	(Chinese Taipei)	Ho Ping-jui	Alpine skiing
21	2022	Winter	(Chinese Taipei)	Huang Yu-ting	Speed skating
22	2024	Summer	(Chinese Taipei)	Sun Chen	Breaking
22	2024	Summer	(Chinese Taipei)	Tai Tzu-ying	Badminton
23	2026	Winter	(Chinese Taipei)	Li Yu-hsiang	Figure skating
23	2026	Winter	(Chinese Taipei)	Lin Hsin-jung	Bobsleigh

== See also ==
- Chinese Taipei at the Olympics
