= Chinese Taipei at the 1984 Winter Olympics =

- Chinese Taipei Olympic flag
- IOC code: TPE
- NOC: Chinese Taipei Olympic Committee
- Website: www.tpenoc.net (in Chinese and English)

in Sarajevo
- Competitors: 12 (10 men, 2 women) in 5 sports
- Flag bearer: Ueng Ming-yih
- Officials: 9
- Medals Ranked N/Ath: Gold 0 Silver 0 Bronze 0 Total 0

Winter Olympics appearances (overview)
- 1972; 1976; 1980; 1984; 1988; 1992; 1994; 1998; 2002; 2006; 2010; 2014; 2018; 2022; 2026

The Republic of China (ROC) competed under the name of Chinese Taipei at the 1984 Winter Olympics in Sarajevo, Yugoslavia. The change in name was a result of the Nagoya Resolution, adopted by the International Olympic Committee (IOC) in 1979 due to objections raised in the 1970s by the People's Republic of China (PRC) over the political status of Taiwan. The IOC restrictions over the ROC name had led the ROC to boycott the Summer Games of 1976 and 1980; the PRC had boycotted all the previous Olympic Games. This also marked the first time the name Chinese Taipei was used at the Olympic Games.

== Alpine skiing ==
Men

Athlete	Event	Race 1		Race 2		Total	
Athlete	Event	Time	Rank	Time	Rank	Time	Rank
Ong Ching-Ming	Giant Slalom	1:53.03	74	1:58.94	67	3:51.97	68
Lin Chi-Liang	Giant Slalom	1:52.78	72	2:03.86	72	3:56.64	71
Lin Chi-Liang	Slalom	DNF	–	–	–	DNF	–
Ong Ching-Ming	Slalom	1:10.33	52	1:12.30	38	2:22.63	36

== Biathlon ==
Men

Event	Athlete	Misses ^{1}	Time	Rank
10 km Sprint	Ueng Ming-Yih	4	45:38.1	63

Event	Athlete	Time	Penalties	Adjusted time ^{2}	Rank
20 km	Ueng Ming-Yih	1'37:07.0	8	1'45:07.0	59

^{1} A penalty loop of 150 metres had to be skied per missed target.
^{2} One minute added per missed target.

== Bobsleigh ==
Sled	Athletes	Event	Run 1		Run 2		Run 3		Run 4		Total	
Sled	Athletes	Event	Time	Rank	Time	Rank	Time	Rank	Time	Rank	Time	Rank
TPE-1	Wu Dien-Cheng; Chen Chin-San	Two-man	53.92	25	53.64	23	53.08	22	53.71	26	3:34.35	25
TPE-2	Wu Chung-Chou; Hwang Chi-Fang	Two-man	54.53	27	54.12	26	53.35	25	53.44	25	3:35.44	26

Sled	Athletes	Event	Run 1		Run 2		Run 3		Run 4		Total	
Sled	Athletes	Event	Time	Rank	Time	Rank	Time	Rank	Time	Rank	Time	Rank
TPE-1	Wu Dien-Cheng; Sun Kuang-Ming; Wu Chung-Chou; Chen Chin-San	Four-man	51.45	19	52.15	24	52.03	22	51.95	22	3:27.58	22

== Cross-country skiing ==
Men

Event	Athlete	Race	
Event	Athlete	Time	Rank
15 km	Wang Chi-Hing	1'03:17.0	83
15 km	Chang Kun-Shung	1'02:57.7	81
15 km	Ueng Ming-Yih	1'00:10.6	80

== Luge ==
Men

Athlete	Run 1		Run 2		Run 3		Run 4		Total	
Athlete	Time	Rank	Time	Rank	Time	Rank	Time	Rank	Time	Rank
Sun Kuang-Ming	50.090	29	48.080	25	49.174	28	47.946	23	3:15.290	25

Women

Athlete	Run 1		Run 2		Run 3		Run 4		Total	
Athlete	Time	Rank	Time	Rank	Time	Rank	Time	Rank	Time	Rank
Chuang Lai-Chun	44.093	22	DNF	–	–	–	–	–	DNF	–
Teng Pi-Hui	43.579	18	43.280	17	44.107	20	46.512	23	2:57.478	21
