= Chinese Taipei at the 1988 Winter Olympics =

- Chinese Taipei Olympic flag
- IOC code: TPE
- NOC: Chinese Taipei Olympic Committee
- Website: www.tpenoc.net (in Chinese and English)

in Calgary
- Competitors: 13 (11 men, 2 women) in 4 sports
- Flag bearer: Chen Chin-San
- Medals: Gold 0 Silver 0 Bronze 0 Total 0

Winter Olympics appearances (overview)
- 1972; 1976; 1980; 1984; 1988; 1992; 1994; 1998; 2002; 2006; 2010; 2014; 2018; 2022; 2026

Due to the political status of Taiwan, the Republic of China (ROC) competed as Chinese Taipei (中華臺北隊) at the 1988 Winter Olympics in Calgary, Alberta, Canada. The International Olympic Committee mandates that the Chinese Taipei Olympic Committee flag is used, and not the flag of the Republic of China.

Calgary 1988 marked the first time the Taiwanese Olympic team competed in Canada as Chinese Taipei (who is still Republic of China) and other nations boycotted the 1976 Summer Olympics in Montreal due to the IOC's refusal to ban New Zealand.

== Competitors ==
The following is the list of number of competitors in the Games.

Sport	Men	Women	Total
Alpine skiing	5	0	5
Bobsleigh	5	–	5
Figure skating	1	1	2
Luge	1	1	2
Total	11	2	13

== Alpine skiing ==
Men

Athlete	Event	Race 1	Race 2	Total	
Athlete	Event	Time	Time	Time	Rank
Tang Wei-Tsu	Super-G			DSQ	–
Lin Chi-Liang	Super-G			2:30.81	57
Ong Ching-Ming	Super-G			2:17.22	55
Kuo Koul-Hwa	Giant Slalom	DSQ	–	DSQ	–
Ong Ching-Ming	Giant Slalom	DSQ	–	DSQ	–
Lin Chi-Liang	Giant Slalom	DSQ	–	DSQ	–
Chen Tong-Jong	Giant Slalom	DSQ	–	DSQ	–
Tang Wei-Tsu	Slalom	DSQ	–	DSQ	–
Ong Ching-Ming	Slalom	DNF	–	DNF	–
Chen Tong-Jong	Slalom	1:33.57	1:17.53	2:51.10	48

== Bobsleigh ==
Sled	Athletes	Event	Run 1		Run 2		Run 3		Run 4		Total	
Sled	Athletes	Event	Time	Rank	Time	Rank	Time	Rank	Time	Rank	Time	Rank
TPE-1	Chen Chin-San; Lee Chen-Tan	Two-man	57.83	8	1:00.22	19	1:00.99	17	1:00.07	18	3:59.11	15
TPE-2	Sun Kuang-Ming; Chen Chin-Sen	Two-man	59.25	27	1:01.54	35	1:02.26	34	1:02.01	35	4:05.06	33

Sled	Athletes	Event	Run 1		Run 2		Run 3		Run 4		Total	
Sled	Athletes	Event	Time	Rank	Time	Rank	Time	Rank	Time	Rank	Time	Rank
TPE-1	Chen Chin-San; Chen Chin-Sen; Lee Chen-Tan; Wang Jauo-Hueyi	Four-man	57.03	10	58.94	23	57.98	23	58.80	23	3:52.75	22

== Figure skating ==
Men

Athlete	CF	SP	FS	TFP	Rank
David Liu	25	23	DNQ	DNF	–

Women

Athlete	CF	SP	FS	TFP	Rank
Pauline Chen Lee	29	29	DNQ	DNF	–

== Luge ==
Men

Athlete	Run 1		Run 2		Run 3		Run 4		Total	
Athlete	Time	Rank	Time	Rank	Time	Rank	Time	Rank	Time	Rank
Sun Kuang-Ming	49.601	33	51.584	35	48.986	30	51.429	34	3:21.600	32

Women

Athlete	Run 1		Run 2		Run 3		Run 4		Total	
Athlete	Time	Rank	Time	Rank	Time	Rank	Time	Rank	Time	Rank
Teng Pi-Hui	48.282	21	48.431	21	49.610	24	50.804	24	3:17.127	24
