= Chinese Taipei at the 1998 Winter Olympics =

- Chinese Taipei Olympic flag
- IOC code: TPE
- NOC: Chinese Taipei Olympic Committee
- Website: www.tpenoc.net (in Chinese and English)

in Nagano
- Competitors: 7 (6 men, 1 woman) in 3 sports
- Flag bearer: Sun Kuang-Ming (bobsleigh)
- Medals: Gold 0 Silver 0 Bronze 0 Total 0

Winter Olympics appearances (overview)
- 1972; 1976; 1980; 1984; 1988; 1992; 1994; 1998; 2002; 2006; 2010; 2014; 2018; 2022; 2026

Due to the political status of Taiwan, the Republic of China (ROC) competed as Chinese Taipei at the 1998 Winter Olympics in Nagano, Japan. The International Olympic Committee mandates that the Chinese Taipei Olympic Committee flag is used, and not the flag of the Republic of China.

== Competitors ==
The following is the list of number of competitors in the Games.

Sport	Men	Women	Total
Bobsleigh	4	–	4
Figure skating	1	0	1
Luge	1	1	2
Total	6	1	7

== Bobsleigh ==
Sled	Athletes	Event	Run 1		Run 2		Run 3		Run 4		Total	
Sled	Athletes	Event	Time	Rank	Time	Rank	Time	Rank	Time	Rank	Time	Rank
TPE-1	Sun Kuang-Ming; Cheng Jin-Shan	Two-man	56.84	34	56.86	33	56.71	33	56.93	35	3:47.34	34

Sled	Athletes	Event	Run 1		Run 2		Run 3		Total	
Sled	Athletes	Event	Time	Rank	Time	Rank	Time	Rank	Time	Rank
TPE-1	Sun Kuang-Ming; Duh Maw-Sheng; Chang Mau-San; Cheng Jin-Shan	Four-man	55.30	27	55.13	26	55.52	26	2:45.95	26

== Figure skating ==
Men

Athlete	SP	FS	TFP	Rank
David Liu	27	DNF	DNF	–

== Luge ==
Men

Athlete	Run 1		Run 2		Run 3		Run 4		Total	
Athlete	Time	Rank	Time	Rank	Time	Rank	Time	Rank	Time	Rank
Hsieh Hsiang-Chun	54.192	31	53.093	31	53.325	29	54.159	30	3:34.769	30

Women

Athlete	Run 1		Run 2		Run 3		Run 4		Total	
Athlete	Time	Rank	Time	Rank	Time	Rank	Time	Rank	Time	Rank
Lee Yi-Fang	55.052	29	55.217	29	56.648	29	53.117	27	3:40.034	29
