= Chinese Taipei at the 1992 Winter Olympics =

- Chinese Taipei Olympic flag
- IOC code: TPE
- NOC: Chinese Taipei Olympic Committee
- Website: www.tpenoc.net (in Chinese and English)

in Albertville
- Competitors: 8 (men) in 3 sports
- Medals: Gold 0 Silver 0 Bronze 0 Total 0

Winter Olympics appearances (overview)
- 1972; 1976; 1980; 1984; 1988; 1992; 1994; 1998; 2002; 2006; 2010; 2014; 2018; 2022; 2026

Due to the political status of Taiwan, the Republic of China (ROC) competed as Chinese Taipei at the 1992 Winter Olympics in Albertville, France. The International Olympic Committee mandates that the Chinese Taipei Olympic Committee flag is used, and not the flag of the Republic of China.

== Competitors ==
The following is the list of number of competitors in the Games.

Sport	Men	Women	Total
Alpine skiing	3	0	3
Bobsleigh	4	–	4
Figure skating	1	0	1
Total	8	0	8

== Alpine skiing ==
Men

Athlete	Event	Race 1	Race 2	Total	
Athlete	Event	Time	Time	Time	Rank
Tang Wei-Tsu	Super-G			DNF	–
Ong Ching-Ming	Giant Slalom	1:38.66	DNF	DNF	–
Chen Tong-Jong	Giant Slalom	1:31.48	1:34.51	3:05.99	81
Chen Tong-Jong	Slalom	DNF	–	DNF	–

== Bobsleigh ==
Sled	Athletes	Event	Run 1		Run 2		Run 3		Run 4		Total	
Sled	Athletes	Event	Time	Rank	Time	Rank	Time	Rank	Time	Rank	Time	Rank
TPE-1	Chen Chin-San; Chang Min-Jung	Two-man	1:02.77	30	1:03.83	32	1:02.91	32	1:02.96	33	4:10.97	33

Sled	Athletes	Event	Run 1		Run 2		Run 3		Run 4		Total	
Sled	Athletes	Event	Time	Rank	Time	Rank	Time	Rank	Time	Rank	Time	Rank
TPE-1	Chen Chin-San; Chen Chin-Sen; Hsu Kuo-Jung; Chang Min-Jung	Four-man	1:00.31	27	1:00.45	26	1:00.52	25	1:00.66	26	4:01.94	26

== Figure skating ==
Men

Athlete	SP	FS	TFP	Rank
David Liu	15	19	26.5	17
