= Chinese Olympics =

Chinese Olympics may refer to:

- 2008 Summer Olympics in Beijing, China
- 2022 Winter Olympics in Beijing, China
- China at the Olympics (IOC code: CHN) People's Republic of China (1952, 1980–present)
  - Chinese Olympic Committee, its National Olympic Committee
- Chinese Taipei at the Olympics (IOC code: ROC, RCF, TWN, and TPE) Taiwan (1956–present)
  - Chinese Taipei Olympic Committee, its National Olympic Committee
- Republic of China at the Olympics (IOC code: ROC) (1924–1948)
