= Chinese Taipei at the 2010 Winter Olympics =

- Chinese Taipei Olympic flag
- IOC code: TPE
- NOC: Chinese Taipei Olympic Committee
- Website: www.tpenoc.net (in Chinese and English)

in Vancouver
- Competitors: 1 in 1 sport
- Flag bearer: Ma Chih-hung
- Medals: Gold 0 Silver 0 Bronze 0 Total 0

Winter Olympics appearances (overview)
- 1972; 1976; 1980; 1984; 1988; 1992; 1994; 1998; 2002; 2006; 2010; 2014; 2018; 2022; 2026

Chinese Taipei (Chinese: 中華臺北; pinyin: Zhōnghuá Táiběi) sent a delegation to compete at the 2010 Winter Olympics in Vancouver, British Columbia, Canada from 12–28 February 2010. Although the nation is known as Taiwan or the Republic of China, the International Olympic Committee mandates that the Chinese Taipei Olympic Committee flag and name is used, and not the flag of Taiwan, as per the Nagoya Resolution, which Chinese Taipei accepted in 1981. This was Chinese Taipei's eighth time participating in the Winter Olympic Games. The Chinese Taipei delegation consisted of a single athlete, luger Ma Chih-hung. He finished 34th in the men's singles event.

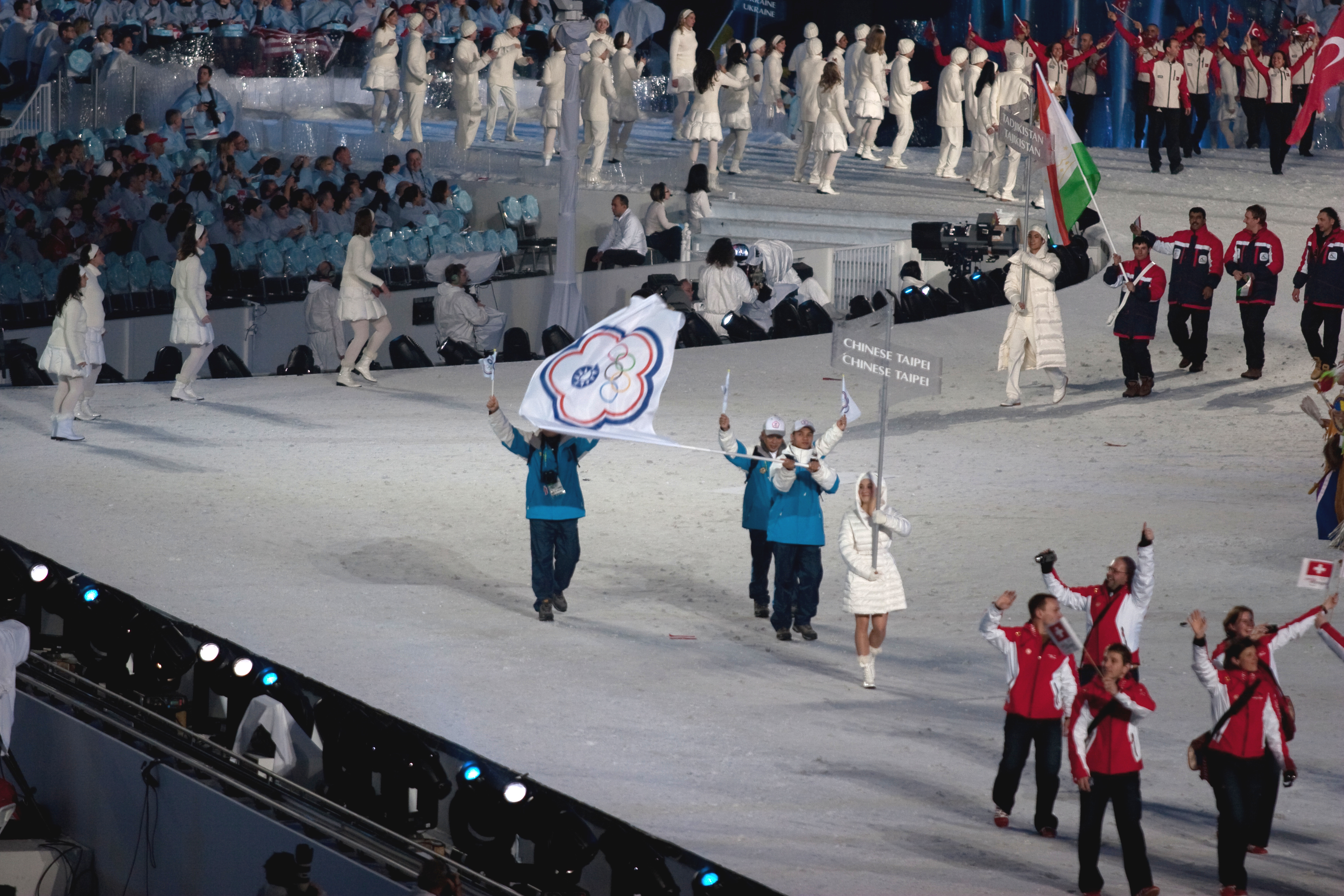
The athlete entering the stadium during the opening ceremonies.

== Background ==
Following the Chinese Civil War, the Republic of China retained control of only the island of Taiwan and a few other minor islands. After international recognition shifted to the People's Republic of China in the 1970s and under the People's Republic's One China policy, the only way the Republic of China could participate in international organizations was under a name acceptable to the People's Republic. The Republic of China boycotted the Olympics, at the 1976 Summer Olympics and both Games in 1980 after not being allowed to compete under the name "Republic of China". Chinese Taipei accepted the Nagoya Resolution in 1981 and first officially participated in the Olympics at the 1984 Winter Olympics. Chinese Taipei has sent delegations to every Winter Olympic Games since, making Vancouver their eighth appearance at a Winter Olympics under that name. For the second consecutive Winter Olympics, the Chinese Taipei delegation consisted of a single athlete, luger Ma Chih-hung. Ma was chosen as the flag bearer for both the opening ceremony and the closing ceremony.

== Luge ==
Ma Chih-hung was 24 years old at the time of the Vancouver Olympics, and had represented Chinese Taipei four years prior at the 2006 Winter Olympics. The men's singles was held over 13–14 February, with two of the four runs being contested on each day. On the first day, he posted run times of 50.318 seconds and 50.460 seconds. After the first day, he sat in 33rd place out of 38 competitors. On the second day, he put up times of 51.090 seconds and 50.494 seconds. His total time was therefore 3 minutes and 22.362 seconds, which dropped Ma into 34th overall.

Athlete	Event	Final					
Athlete	Event	Run 1	Run 2	Run 3	Run 4	Total	Rank
Ma Chih-hung	Men's singles	50.318	50.460	51.090	50.494	3:22.362	34

== See also ==
- Chinese Taipei at the 2010 Asian Games
- Chinese Taipei at the 2010 Summer Youth Olympics
