= Chinese Taipei at the 2006 Winter Olympics =

- Chinese Taipei Olympic flag
- IOC code: TPE
- NOC: Chinese Taipei Olympic Committee
- Website: www.tpenoc.net (in Chinese and English)

in Turin
- Competitors: 1 (1 man) in 1 sport
- Flag bearer: Ma Chih-Hung (opening)
- Medals: Gold 0 Silver 0 Bronze 0 Total 0

Winter Olympics appearances (overview)
- 1972; 1976; 1980; 1984; 1988; 1992; 1994; 1998; 2002; 2006; 2010; 2014; 2018; 2022; 2026

Chinese Taipei sent a delegation to compete at the 2006 Winter Olympics in Turin, Italy from 10–26 February 2006. Although the nation is known as Taiwan or the Republic of China, the International Olympic Committee mandates that the Chinese Taipei Olympic Committee flag and name is used, and not the flag of Taiwan, as per the Nagoya Resolution. This was Chinese Taipei's seventh time participating in the Winter Olympic Games. The Chinese Taipei delegation consisted of a single athlete, luger Ma Chih-hung. He finished 28th in the men's singles.

== Background ==
Following the Chinese Civil War, the Republic of China retained control of only Taiwan island and a few other minor islands. After international recognition shifted to the People's Republic of China in the 1970s and under the People's Republic's One China policy, the only way the Republic of China could participate in international organizations was under a name acceptable to the People's Republic. Nevertheless, the Republic of China was allowed to compete under that name at the 1972 Winter Olympics and the 1976 Winter Olympics. The Republic of China boycotted the Olympics in 1976 and 1980 after not being allowed to compete under the name "Republic of China" Chinese Taipei accepted the Nagoya Resolution in 1981 and first officially participated in the Olympics at the 1984 Winter Olympics. Chinese Taipei has sent delegations to every Winter Olympic Games since, making Turin their seventh appearance at a Winter Olympics. Their delegation to Turin consisted of a single competitor in luge, Ma Chih-hung. He was accompanied to Turin by coaches and teammates to act as logistical support. Ma was the flag bearer for the opening ceremony while a volunteer carried the flag for the closing ceremony.

== Luge ==
Ma Chih-hung was 20 years old at the time of the Turin Olympics, and was making his debut Olympic appearance. The men's singles was held on 11–12 February, with two runs contested on each day. On the first day, he posted times of 53.939 seconds and 53.605 seconds. At the close of the first day, he was in 31st place. The next day he posted run times of 53.977 seconds and 53.62 seconds. Although he did not finish in the top 30 in any individual run, his consistency across the four runs saw him end up with a total time of 3 minutes and 35.141 seconds, which placed him 28th overall. Ma would go on to represent Chinese Taipei again at the 2010 Winter Olympics.

Athlete	Event	Final					
Athlete	Event	Run 1	Run 2	Run 3	Run 4	Total	Rank
Ma Chih-hung	Men's singles	53.939	53.605	53.977	53.620	3:35.141	28

== See also ==
- Chinese Taipei at the 2006 Asian Games
