= Chinese Taipei at the 1994 Winter Olympics =

- Chinese Taipei Olympic flag
- IOC code: TPE
- NOC: Chinese Taipei Olympic Committee
- Website: www.tpenoc.net (in Chinese and English)

in Lillehammer
- Competitors: 2 (men) in 1 sport
- Flag bearer: Sun Kuang-Ming
- Medals: Gold 0 Silver 0 Bronze 0 Total 0

Winter Olympics appearances (overview)
- 1972; 1976; 1980; 1984; 1988; 1992; 1994; 1998; 2002; 2006; 2010; 2014; 2018; 2022; 2026

Due to the political status of Taiwan, the Republic of China (ROC) competed as Chinese Taipei (中華台北) at the 1994 Winter Olympics in Lillehammer, Norway. The International Olympic Committee mandates that the Chinese Taipei Olympic Committee flag is used, and not the flag of the Republic of China.

== Competitors ==
The following is the list of number of competitors in the Games.

| Sport | Men | Women | Total |
|---|---|---|---|
| Bobsleigh | 2 | – | 2 |
| Total | 2 | 0 | 2 |

== Bobsleigh ==
| Sled | Athletes | Event | Run 1 | | Run 2 | | Run 3 | | Run 4 | | Total | |
| Sled | Athletes | Event | Time | Rank | Time | Rank | Time | Rank | Time | Rank | Time | Rank |
|---|---|---|---|---|---|---|---|---|---|---|---|---|
| TPE-1 | Sun Kuang-Ming; Chang Min-Jung | Two-man | 54.48 | 33 | 54.63 | 32 | 55.24 | 39 | 55.09 | 36 | 3:39.44 | 35 |

== Sources ==
- Official Olympic Reports
- Olympic Winter Games 1994, full results by sports-reference.com
