= Republic of China at the 1976 Winter Olympics =

- Flag of the Republic of China
- IOC code: ROC
- NOC: Republic of China Olympic Committee (Note: See Chinese Taipei Olympic Committee#History.)

in Innsbruck
- Competitors: 6 (men) in 4 sports
- Medals: Gold 0 Silver 0 Bronze 0 Total 0

Winter Olympics appearances (overview)
- 1972; 1976; 1980; 1984; 1988; 1992; 1994; 1998; 2002; 2006; 2010; 2014; 2018; 2022; 2026

The Republic of China (Taiwan) competed at the 1976 Winter Olympics in Innsbruck, Austria. The ROC would not return to the Olympics until 1984 and under the name "Chinese Taipei" due to objections by the People's Republic of China over the political status of Taiwan. The PRC boycotted the Olympics due to the Taiwanese participation under the name "Republic of China".

== Alpine skiing ==
Men

Athlete	Event	Race 1		Race 2		Total	
Athlete	Event	Time	Rank	Time	Rank	Time	Rank
Chen Yun-Ming	Giant Slalom	2:39.82	83	2:43.46	52	5:23.28	52
Chen Yun-Ming	Slalom	DNF	–	–	–	DNF	–

== Biathlon ==
Men

Event	Athlete	Time	Penalties	Adjusted time ^{1}	Rank
20 km	Shen Li-Chien	1'49:32.91	9	1'58:32.91	51
20 km	Ueng Ming-Yih	1'32:09.37	10	1'42:09.37	50

^{1} One minute added per close miss (a hit in the outer ring), two minutes added per complete miss.

== Cross-country skiing ==
Men

Event	Athlete	Race	
Event	Athlete	Time	Rank
15 km	Shen Li-Chien	1'06:45.77	77
15 km	Liang Reng-Guey	1'06:02.79	76
15 km	Ueng Ming-Yih	57:02.75	73

== Luge ==
Men

Athlete	Run 1		Run 2		Run 3		Run 4		Total	
Athlete	Time	Rank	Time	Rank	Time	Rank	Time	Rank	Time	Rank
Shieh Wei-Cheng	56.256	30	56.213	36	56.914	37	55.817	33	3:45.200	34
Huang Liu-Chong	55.405	26	1:42.821	38	1:49.520	38	54.900	25	5:22.646	38

(Men's) Doubles

Athletes	Run 1		Run 2		Total	
Athletes	Time	Rank	Time	Rank	Time	Rank
Shieh Wei-Cheng; Huang Liu-Chong	45.745	21	45.633	21	1:31.378	21
