= Chinese Taipei at the 2014 Winter Olympics =

- Chinese Taipei Olympic flag
- IOC code: TPE
- NOC: Chinese Taipei Olympic Committee
- Website: www.tpenoc.net (in Chinese and English)

in Sochi
- Competitors: 3 in 3 sports
- Flag bearer: Sung Ching-yang (opening) Mackenzie Blackburn (closing)
- Medals: Gold 0 Silver 0 Bronze 0 Total 0

Winter Olympics appearances (overview)
- 1972; 1976; 1980; 1984; 1988; 1992; 1994; 1998; 2002; 2006; 2010; 2014; 2018; 2022; 2026; 2030

Chinese Taipei competed at the 2014 Winter Olympics in Sochi, Russia from the 7 to 23 February 2014. The Chinese Taipei team consisted of three athletes in three sports, including short track speed skating and speed skating for the first time ever.

Since 1984, athletes from Taiwan have competed at the Olympics as "Chinese Taipei" due to political reasons. Even though the country's name is Taiwan (Republic of China), due to opposition from China, they compete under a different name. Also, The 2014 Games marked the first time a Taiwanese Olympic team competed in Russia, as Taiwan and 64 western countries took part at the American-led boycott in the 1980 Summer Olympics held in Moscow due to the Soviet–Afghan War.

== Luge ==
Chinese Taipei received a reallocation quota spot in luge.

Athlete	Event	Run 1		Run 2		Run 3		Run 4		Total	
Athlete	Event	Time	Rank	Time	Rank	Time	Rank	Time	Rank	Time	Rank
Lien Te-an	Men's singles	1:02.961	39	55.315	39	55.287	38	54.528	39	3:48.091	39

== Short track speed skating ==
Chinese Taipei qualified 1 male athlete for the Olympics during World Cup 3 & 4 in November 2013.

Men

Athlete	Event	Heat		Quarterfinal		Semifinal		Final	
Athlete	Event	Time	Rank	Time	Rank	Time	Rank	Time	Rank
Mackenzie Blackburn	500 m	42.337	3	did not advance					23
Mackenzie Blackburn	1000 m	1:26.814	3	did not advance					23

== Speed skating ==
Based on the results from the fall World Cups during the 2013–14 ISU Speed Skating World Cup season, Chinese Taipei earned the following start quotas:

Men

Athlete	Event	Race 1		Race 2		Final	
Athlete	Event	Time	Rank	Time	Rank	Time	Rank
Sung Ching-yang	500 m	35.732	31	35.63	33	71.36	33
Sung Ching-yang	1000 m	—				1:13.79	40
