= Chinese Taipei at the 2018 Winter Olympics =

- Chinese Taipei Olympic flag
- IOC code: TPE
- NOC: Chinese Taipei Olympic Committee
- Website: www.tpenoc.net (in Chinese)

in Pyeongchang
- Competitors: 4 in 2 sports
- Flag bearer: Lien Te-an (opening)
- Medals: Gold 0 Silver 0 Bronze 0 Total 0

Winter Olympics appearances (overview)
- 1972; 1976; 1980; 1984; 1988; 1992; 1994; 1998; 2002; 2006; 2010; 2014; 2018; 2022; 2026

Taiwan competed as Chinese Taipei at the 2018 Winter Olympics in Pyeongchang, South Korea, from 9 to 25 February 2018, with four competitors in two sports.

== Competitors ==
The following is the list of number of competitors participating in the delegation per sport.

Sport	Men	Women	Total
Luge	1	0	1
Speed skating	2	1	3
Total	3	1	4

== Luge ==
Chinese Taipei qualified one male luge athlete. Lien Te-an qualified in men's singles by being ranked in the top 38 of the 2017–18 Luge World Cup standings.

Athlete	Event	Run 1		Run 2		Run 3		Run 4		Total	
Athlete	Event	Time	Rank	Time	Rank	Time	Rank	Time	Rank	Time	Rank
Lien Te-an	Men's singles	52.121	39	51.472	39	50.545	40	Eliminated		2:34.138	38

== Speed skating ==
Chinese Taipei earned the following quotas at the conclusion of the four World Cups used for qualification.

Athlete	Event	Race	
Athlete	Event	Time	Rank
Sung Ching-yang	Men's 500 m	35.86	34
Tai William	Men's 1500 m	1:50.63	34
Huang Yu-ting	Women's 500 m	38.98	22
Huang Yu-ting	Women's 1000 m	1:16.44	20
Huang Yu-ting	Women's 1500 m	2:18.84	26

== See also ==
- Chinese Taipei at the 2017 Asian Winter Games
- Chinese Taipei at the 2018 Summer Youth Olympics
