= Chinese Taipei at the 2022 Winter Olympics =

- Chinese Taipei Olympic flag
- IOC code: TPE
- NOC: Chinese Taipei Olympic Committee
- Website: www.tpenoc.net (in Chinese)

in Beijing
- Competitors: 4 (1 man and 3 women) in 3 sports
- Flag bearers (opening): Huang Yu-ting; Ho Ping-jui
- Flag bearer (closing): Lee Wen-yi
- Medals: Gold 0 Silver 0 Bronze 0 Total 0

Winter Olympics appearances (overview)
- 1972; 1976; 1980; 1984; 1988; 1992; 1994; 1998; 2002; 2006; 2010; 2014; 2018; 2022; 2026

The Republic of China, commonly known as "Taiwan", competed as Chinese Taipei at the 2022 Winter Olympics in Beijing, China from 4 to 20 February 2022. Because of the political status of Taiwan and the One-China policy, the ROC national symbols will not be used as stipulated in the Nagoya Resolution in 1979 forcing the ROC athletes to compete under the Chinese Taipei moniker since 1984.

Huang Yu-ting and Ho Ping-jui were the country's flagbearers during the opening ceremony. Meanwhile alpine skier Lee Wen-yi was the flagbearer during the closing ceremony.

== Background ==
Since the end of the Chinese Civil War, the Kuomintang-ruled Republic of China has retained control of only Taiwan, formerly a Qing prefecture that was previously under Japanese colonial rule from 1895 to 1945, and a few other minor islands. When international recognition shifted to the Chinese Communist Party's People's Republic of China in the 1970s and under the PRC's One-China principle, the only way the ROC could participate in international organizations was under a name acceptable to the PRC. Nevertheless, the ROC was allowed to compete under that name at the 1972 Winter Olympics and the 1976 Winter Olympics.

The ROC boycotted the Olympics in 1976 and 1980 after not being allowed to compete under the name "Republic of China". Chinese Taipei accepted the Nagoya Resolution in 1981 and first officially participated in the Olympics at the 1984 Winter Olympics. Chinese Taipei has sent delegations to every Winter Olympic Games since, making Turin their seventh appearance at a Winter Olympics. Their delegation to Turin consisted of a single competitor in luge, Ma Chih-hung. He was accompanied to Turin by coaches and teammates to act as logistical support. Ma was the flag bearer for the opening ceremony while a volunteer carried the flag for the closing ceremony.

The Chinese Taipei team announced in January 2022 that its athletes would not partake in the opening or closing ceremonies, citing COVID-19 pandemic measures and delayed flights. The decision was reached as a PRC official labelled the ROC as "Taipei, China". After the International Olympic Committee issued a statement confirming that all teams must send personnel to participate in the opening and closing ceremonies, the Chinese Taipei Olympic Committee declared that the ROC would attend both ceremonies. In turn, the Taiwan Association for Human Rights and other organizations protested the CTOC's decision to attend the ceremony, opining that the ROC's attendance was an endorsement of PRC's poor human rights record.

== Competitors ==
The following is the list of number of competitors participating at the Games per sport/discipline.

Sport	Men	Women	Total
Alpine skiing	1	1	2
Luge	0	1	1
Speed skating	0	1	1
Total	1	3	4

== Alpine skiing ==
Chinese Taipei qualified one male and one female alpine skier.

Athlete	Event	Run 1		Run 2		Total	
Athlete	Event	Time	Rank	Time	Rank	Time	Rank
Ho Ping-jui	Men's slalom	DNF		Did not advance			
Lee Wen-yi	Women's slalom	1:36.49	58	1:09.55	50	2:46.04	50

== Luge ==
Based on the results during the 2021–22 Luge World Cup season, Chinese Taipei qualified 1 sled in the women's singles.

Athlete	Event	Run 1		Run 2		Run 3		Run 4		Total	
Athlete	Event	Time	Rank	Time	Rank	Time	Rank	Time	Rank	Time	Rank
Lin Sin-rong	Women's singles	1:01.550	32	1:01.057	29	1:01.004	30	Did not advance		3:03.611	31

== Speed skating ==
Chinese Taipei qualified one female speed skater.

Women
Athlete	Event	Race	
Athlete	Event	Time	Rank
Huang Yu-ting	500 m	39.23	26
Huang Yu-ting	1000 m	1:17.35	24
Huang Yu-ting	1500 m	2:00.78	26
