= ROC at the Olympics =

ROC at the Olympics may refer to:

- Republic of China at the Olympics (1924–1976)
- Republic of China (Taiwan), or Chinese Taipei at the Olympics (1984–present)
- Russian Olympic Committee:
  - Russian Olympic Committee at the Olympics
  - Russian Olympic Committee athletes at the 2020 Summer Olympics
  - Russian Olympic Committee athletes at the 2022 Winter Olympics
