= Chinese Taipei at the 2026 Winter Olympics =

- Chinese Taipei Olympic flag
- IOC code: TPE
- NOC: Chinese Taipei Olympic Committee
- Website: www.tpenoc.net (in Chinese)

in Milan and Cortina d'Ampezzo, Italy 6 February 2026 – 22 February 2026
- Competitors: 8 (3 men and 5 women) in 5 sports
- Flag bearers (opening): Li Yu-Hsiang & Lin Sin-Rong
- Flag bearer (closing): Sophia Tsu Velicer
- Medals: Gold 0 Silver 0 Bronze 0 Total 0

Winter Olympics appearances (overview)
- 1972; 1976; 1980; 1984; 1988; 1992; 1994; 1998; 2002; 2006; 2010; 2014; 2018; 2022; 2026

Chinese Taipei competed at the 2026 Winter Olympics in Milan and Cortina d'Ampezzo, Italy, which was held from 6 to 22 February 2026.

The Republic of China (ROC), also known as Taiwan, competes as "Chinese Taipei" due to its political status. This was decided under the International Olympic Committee's Nagoya Resolution (1979) which allows athletes from Taiwan to compete but without using the ROC name, flag or anthem.

Figure skater Li Yu-Hsiang and bobsledder Lin Sin-Rong were the country's flagbearers during the opening ceremony. Meanwhile, cross-country skier Sophia Tsu Velicer was the country's flagbearer during the closing ceremony.

== Competitors ==
The following is the list of number of competitors participating at the Games per sport/discipline.

Sport	Men	Women	Total
Alpine skiing	1	1	2
Bobsleigh	0	2	2
Cross-country skiing	1	1	2
Figure skating	1	0	1
Speed skating	0	1	1
Total	3	5	8

== Alpine skiing ==
Chinese Taipei qualified one female and one male alpine skier through the basic quota.

Athlete	Event	Run 1		Run 2		Total	
Athlete	Event	Time	Rank	Time	Rank	Time	Rank
Troy Samuel Chang	Men's slalom	1:11.56	41	1:11.29	36	2:22.85	36
Lee Wen-yi	Women's slalom	1:05.47	63	1:07.66	52	2:13.13	52

== Bobsleigh ==
Athlete	Event	Run 1		Run 2		Run 3		Run 4		Total	
Athlete	Event	Time	Rank	Time	Rank	Time	Rank	Time	Rank	Time	Rank
Lin Sin-Rong	Monobob	1:00.61	19	1:01.30	25	1:00.36	15	DNA		3:02.27	21
Lin Sin-Rong*; Lin Song-En	Two-woman	58.65	25	59.09	25	59.03	25	Did not advance		2:56.77	25

== Cross-country skiing ==
For the first time since the nation's last appearance at Sarajevo 1984, Chinese Taipei qualified one male and one female cross-country skier through the basic quota. Following the completion of the 2024–25 FIS Cross-Country World Cup, Chinese Taipei also qualified an additional one female athlete, however they do not (as of 23 March 2025) have any eligible athletes to fill this additional quota spot.

Distance

Athlete	Event	Classical		Freestyle		Final		
Athlete	Event	Time	Rank	Time	Rank	Time	Deficit	Rank
Lee Chieh-han	Men's 10 km freestyle	—N/a		28:39.3	106	—N/a		
Sophia Tsu Velicer	Women's 10 km freestyle	—N/a				26:49.2	+4:00.0	64
Sophia Tsu Velicer	Women's 20 km skiathlon	31:45.7	50	31:38.4	52	1:03:57.5	+10:12.3	52
Sophia Tsu Velicer	Women's 50 km classical	—N/a				2:34:01.5	+17:33.3	22

Sprint

Athlete	Event	Qualification		Quarterfinal		Semifinal		Final	
Athlete	Event	Time	Rank	Time	Rank	Time	Rank	Time	Rank
Sophia Tsu Velicer	Women's sprint	4:02.29	52	Did not advance					

== Figure skating ==
Chinese Taipei qualified one male figure skater, Li Yu-Hsiang, through the ISU Skate to Milano Figure Skating Qualifier 2025 in Beijing, China. This will mark the country's first participation in the sport since 1998.

Athlete	Event	SP/SD		FP/FD		Total	
Athlete	Event	Points	Rank	Points	Rank	Points	Rank
Li Yu-hsiang	Men's singles	72.41	24 Q	141.92	21	214.33	23

== Speed skating ==
Chinese Taipei qualified one female speed skater through performances at the 2025-26 ISU Speed Skating World Cup.

Athlete	Event	Race	
Athlete	Event	Time	Rank
Chen Ying-chu	Women's 500 m	37.914	11
