= Chinese National Olympic Committee =

Chinese National Olympic Committee may refer to:

- Chinese Olympic Committee (PRC)
- Chinese Taipei Olympic Committee (ROC)
