= Liang Reng-guey =

Taiwanese cross-country skier

Personal information
- Nationality: Taiwanese
- Born: 31 May 1950 (age 74)

Sport
- Sport: Cross-country skiing

Liang Reng-guey or Thomas Liang (born 31 May 1950) is a Taiwanese cross-country skier. He competed at the 1972 Winter Olympics and the 1976 Winter Olympics. He also qualified for the 1980 Winter Olympics, but did not compete, as the People's Republic of China protested Taiwanese participation as the Republic of China. Liang later became a coach for other Taiwanese Olympians who were permitted to compete as Chinese Taipei.
