= Lu Yen-hsun =

Taiwanese tennis player

Lu Yen-hsun 盧彥勳
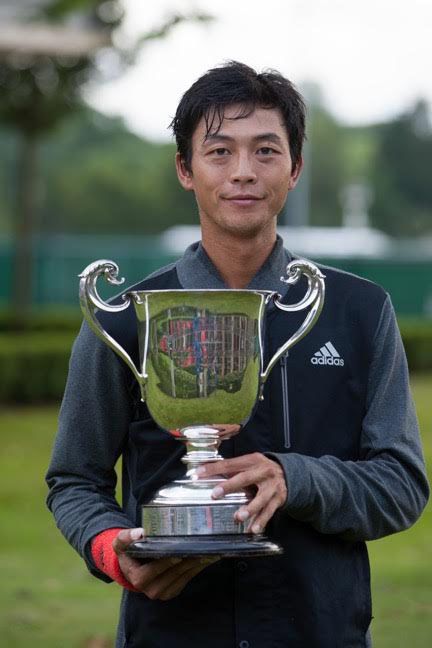
- Lu at the 2016 Aegon Surbiton Trophy
- Country (sports): Chinese Taipei
- Residence: Taipei, Taiwan
- Born: 14 August 1983 (age 43) Taoyuan, Taiwan
- Height: 1.80 m (5 ft 11 in)
- Turned pro: 2001
- Retired: 2021
- Plays: Right-handed (two-handed backhand)
- Prize money: $5,114,400

Singles
- Career record: 162–231
- Career titles: 0
- Highest ranking: No. 33 (1 November 2010)

Grand Slam singles results
- Australian Open: 3R (2009, 2012)
- French Open: 2R (2013, 2015)
- Wimbledon: QF (2010)
- US Open: 2R (2008, 2013, 2017)

Other tournaments
- Olympic Games: 3R (2008)

Doubles
- Career record: 63–93
- Career titles: 3
- Highest ranking: No. 86 (31 January 2005)

Grand Slam doubles results
- Australian Open: 3R (2005)
- French Open: 2R (2012, 2021)
- Wimbledon: 3R (2010)
- US Open: 3R (2009, 2013)

Grand Slam mixed doubles results
- Australian Open: 2R (2005)
Medal record
Men's Tennis
Representing Chinese Taipei
Asian Games
Gold medal – first place	2002 Busan	Mixed doubles
Gold medal – first place	2010 Guangzhou	Men's Team
Silver medal – second place	2014 Incheon	Men's singles
Bronze medal – third place	2006 Doha	Men's Team
Bronze medal – third place	2006 Doha	Mixed doubles
Summer Universiade
Gold medal – first place	2003 Daegu	Men's singles
Bronze medal – third place	2001 Beijing	Men's singles

Lu Yen-hsun
- Traditional Chinese: 盧彥勳
- Simplified Chinese: 卢彦勋
Transcriptions
Standard Mandarin
- Hanyu Pinyin: Lú Yànxūn
- Wade–Giles: Lu^{2} Yen^{4}-hsün^{1}
- IPA: [lǔ jɛ̂n.ɕýn]

Lu Yen-hsun (Chinese: 盧彥勳; born 14 August 1983) is a Taiwanese tennis coach and a former professional player, who goes by the nickname Rendy Lu. He won the most titles on the ATP Challenger Tour in tennis history. His favorite surface was hardcourt, though several of his ATP Tour career highlights came on grass, including reaching the quarterfinals of the 2010 Wimbledon Championships. Lu became the first player from Taiwan to break into the ATP top 100 in 2004.

== Juniors ==
Lu was an accomplished junior player, reaching as high as No. 3 in the ITF junior singles rankings in February 2001 (and No. 9 in doubles). In his junior career, he compiled a singles win–loss record of 80–37 (63–34 in doubles) and defeated a handful of future ATP stars, including Robin Söderling, Mario Ančić, and Philipp Kohlschreiber.

His result in Junior Grand Slam events are as follows:

- Australian Open: 1R (2001)
- French Open: 1R (2000)
- Wimbledon: 1R (2000)
- US Open: 2R (2000)

== Tennis career ==
=== 2004: Historic Top 100 ===
In 2004, Lu became the first player from Taiwan to break into the top 100, thanks to a solid performance in the Challenger Tour in the first half of 2004. He started to participate in many tour-level events. Although he suffered many defeats, his effort yielded some good wins. His most notable win came on grass in the Queen's Club Championships, where he gained his first top-10 win by defeating then world No. 3, Guillermo Coria.

=== 2005–2007 ===
A series of injuries caused his ranking to fall rapidly in 2005. He did not participate in any tournaments after withdrawing in the second round in Ho Chi Minh City.

Returning to the circuit, Lu enjoyed a solid performance throughout the season, and a late surge at the end of the season, advancing to semifinals or better in four consecutive Challengers (Rimouski, Busan, Caloundra, and Kawana). He lost in the final of Rimouski to his friend Kristian Pless. Two weeks later, Lu won the Caloundra Challenger, beating Peter Luczak. The following week, he lost in the final to Julien Jeanpierre. Lu's hot streak moved him from No. 140 in the ATP in October to No. 89 at year-end.

In winter 2006, Lu was training with Rainer Schüttler and Janko Tipsarević in Dubai, under Dirk Hordorff. The training seemed to yield good results, as Lu reached the second round at the Australian Open and his first ATP level quarter-final in Memphis in 2007. By defeating Jürgen Melzer in the second round, Lu reached his first ATP level quarter-final, but lost to eventual finalist Andy Roddick. With this strong performance, Lu broke into the top 80 in February.

=== 2008 ===
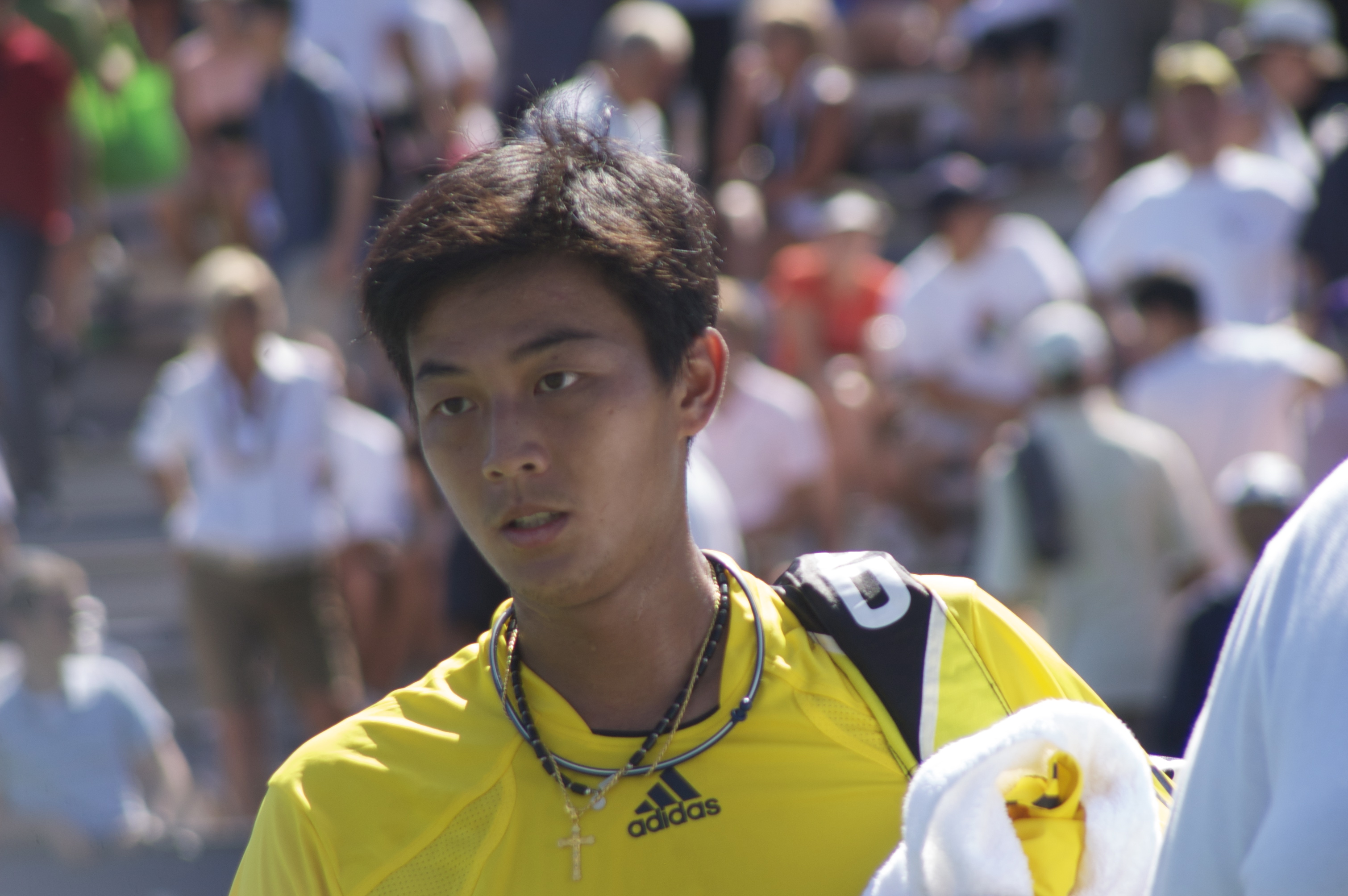
Lu at the 2008 US Open.

In 2008, Lu did well on the Challenger Tour, taking home titles in Waikoloa, New Delhi and Tashkent, while reaching the finals of three other Challenger events. On the ATP Tour, Lu booked a spot in the quarter-finals in San Jose by defeating Max Mirnyi in the first round and Wayne Odesnik in straight sets in the second round. He then lost to Radek Štěpánek in the quarter-finals in two sets.

Perhaps Lu's best performance during the season came at the Beijing Olympics, representing Chinese Taipei. Lu shocked audiences by defeating then sixth ranked player in the world, Andy Murray, in straight sets in the first round. Lu continued his winning streak at the Olympics by defeating Agustín Calleri of Argentina to advance to the third round (round of 16), but eventually lost to Jürgen Melzer of Austria.

=== 2009 ===
At the 2009 Australian Open, Lu advanced to the third round of a Grand Slam tournament for the first time, defeating 10th seeded David Nalbandian in five sets in the second round. He lost to Tommy Robredo in the third round.

Lu, ranked 82, defeated former world No. 1, Lleyton Hewitt, in the first round of the Delray Beach International Tennis Championships. He then lost to Stefan Koubek.

In May 2009, Lu won the $100k Israel Open at Ramat HaSharon, beating German Benjamin Becker, who was forced to retire.

Lu retired in his first-round match against Mathieu Montcourt at Roland Garros, whilst trailing 2–6.

He was defeated by Roger Federer in the first round of Wimbledon in three sets.

In November 2009, Lu won the $100k Flea Market Cup at Chuncheon, beating Dutch player Igor Sijsling.

=== 2010 ===
At 2010 Wimbledon, Lu became the first Taiwanese player to reach the quarter-finals of a Grand Slam championship, and the first man from Asia to reach the quarter-finals at a major in 15 years. He made it to the fourth round without dropping a set defeating Horacio Zeballos, Michał Przysiężny, and Florian Mayer, with Mayer withdrawing in the third set. The unseeded Lu achieved the biggest of the upsets on "Manic Monday" by beating world No. 5, Andy Roddick (who was ranked 77 places higher than Lu), in 4 hours and 36 mins with the fifth set going to 9–7. He lost to No. 3 seed Novak Djokovic but moved up 40 places to 42nd in the ATP after Wimbledon. The ATP named Lu's fourth-round Wimbledon upset against Roddick as the biggest upset of 2010. At the beginning of November, Lu reached a career-high ATP ranking of 33.

=== 2011–2013 ===
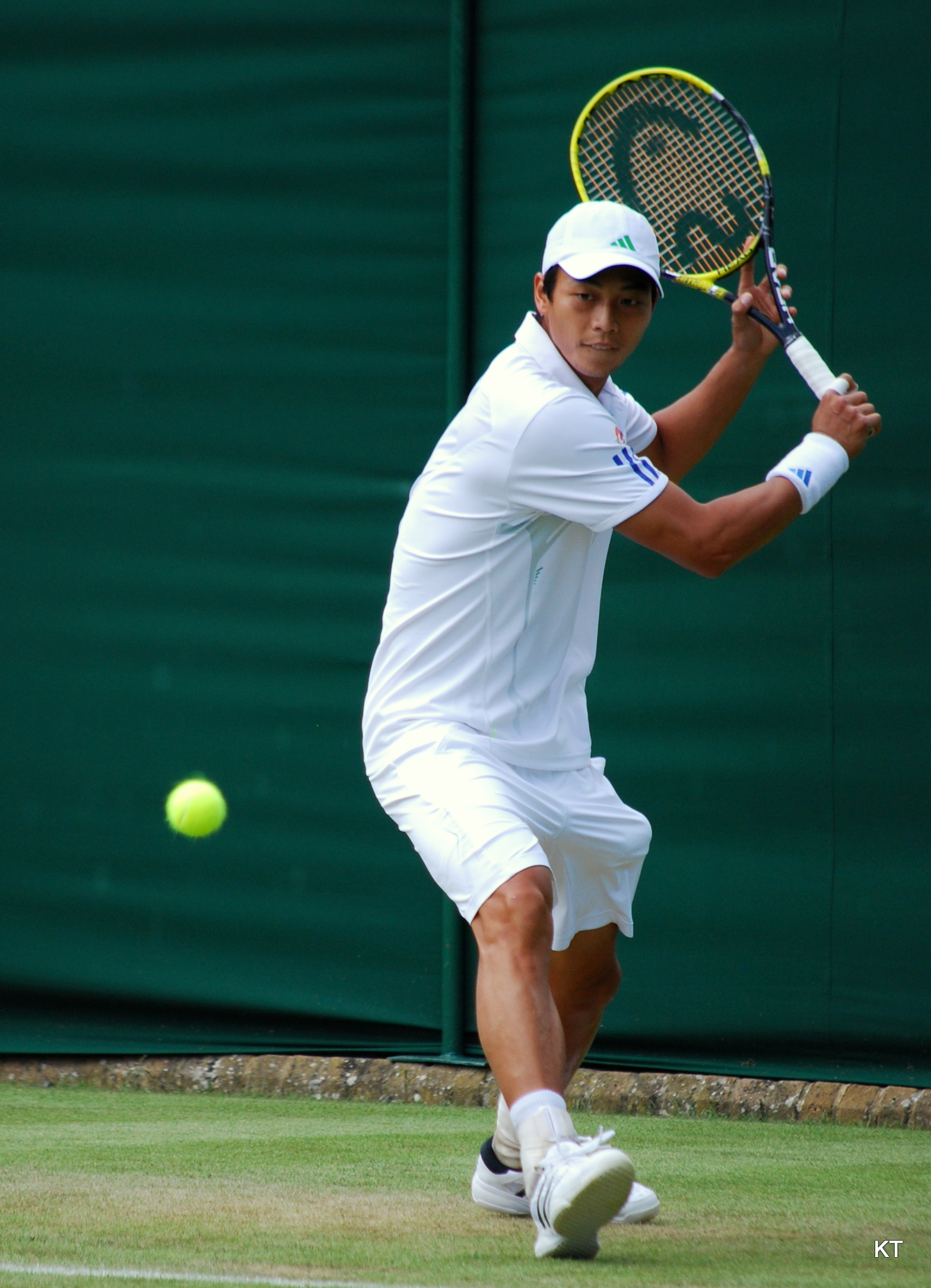
At Wimbledon, 2011

At the 2011 Farmers Classic, Lu defeated Robby Ginepri in the first round. He then defeated Marcos Baghdatis before losing to Ryan Harrison in the quarter-finals. He started the Odlum Brown Vancouver Open as the number one seeded player, defeating George Bastl in the first round before losing to Alex Bogdanovic. At the Rogers Cup, Lu lost to Bernard Tomic in the first round.

On 15 June 2012, Lu clinched a huge maiden victory with a third set tiebreak triumph over third seed and world No. 8 Janko Tipsarević to reach the quarterfinals at the 2012 Queen's Club Championships in London.

Lu lost in the second round in all Grand Slam events held in 2013.

=== 2014–2015: Auckland final, top 5 win ===
On 10 January 2014, Lu reached his maiden ATP final in Auckland against John Isner by defeating Steve Johnson in the quarterfinals, and world No. 3 David Ferrer in the semifinals, then equaling the biggest win of his career, but lost in the final 6–7, 6–7.

During the 2014 Asian Games, the ATP threatened to fine and ban Lu for three years if he did not report to the China Open on September 29. He had signed up to participate in both events, but the final for the Asian Games did not take place until September 30, a schedule conflict the ATP would not accommodate. In response, Lu dropped out of the China Open. The ATP then announced that Lu would be fined, but not banned.

In 2015, Lu won his third doubles tournament with Jonathan Marray, at the Chennai Open. Lu also reached a career milestone by becoming only the second player in history to reach 300 career Challenger wins behind Rubén Ramírez Hidalgo.

=== 2016–2020: Record number of Challenger titles ===
In 2016, Lu reached the finals of six more challenger events and won four. His best ATP Tour performance of the year was a quarterfinal appearance at the 2016 Winston-Salem Open.

On 12 August 2017, Lu won his record 37th career and last challenger singles title at the Jinan Open against Ričardas Berankis.

In 2018, Lu underwent shoulder surgery which kept him out of play for most of the 2018 season and all of the 2019 season.

Lu officially came back at the 2020 Australian Open where he gained a protected ranking in the main draw. He lost to Gaël Monfils in the first round in straight sets.

=== 2021: Record Olympics participation, retirement ===
At the Miami Open, Lu recorded his last ATP match win against Sam Querrey. He would then lose in the next round to world No. 2, Daniil Medvedev.

In June 2021, after playing a few more ATP matches, Lu announced that he would retire from tennis and that the 2021 Wimbledon Championships and the Tokyo Summer Olympics would be his last tournaments on the tour.

At the 2021 Tokyo Olympics, he was one of the two official flag bearers for Taiwan (Chinese Taipei) at the opening ceremony.

On 25 July 2021, Lu played his last career tennis match at the Olympics against Alexander Zverev where he lost in straight sets. With this appearance, he became one of 6 male tennis players with 5 or more appearances at the Olympics, and is the only male tennis player alongside Novak Djokovic who competed in singles at 5 Olympics, as of the 2024 Summer Olympics.

Lu would ended his career with 56 singles and 31 doubles Challenger titles, holding the record for the most singles Challenger titles with 37 in 56 finals, and the most combined singles and doubles Challenger titles.

== Coaching career ==
Lu is the current coach of Chinese tennis player Zhang Zhizhen.

== ATP career finals ==
=== Singles: 1 (runner-up) ===
Legend Grand Slam tournaments ATP World Tour Masters 1000 ATP World Tour 500 Series ATP World Tour 250 Series (0–1)	Finals by surface Hard (0–1) Clay (0–0) Grass (0–0) Carpet (0–0)

Result	W–L	Date	Tournament	Surface	Opponent	Score
Runner-up	0–1	Jan 2014	Auckland Open, New Zealand	Hard	(United States) John Isner	6–7^{(4–7)}, 6–7^{(7–9)}

=== Doubles: 6 (3–3) ===
Legend Grand Slam tournaments ATP World Tour Masters 1000 ATP World Tour 500 Series ATP World Tour 250 Series (3–3)	Finals by surface Hard (0–0) Clay (0–1) Grass (0–0) Carpet (0–0)

Outcome	W–L	Date	Tournament	Surface	Partner	Opponents	Score
Winner	1–0	Jan 2005	Chennai Open, India	Hard	(Germany) Rainer Schüttler	(Sweden) Jonas Björkman (India) Mahesh Bhupathi	7–5, 4–6, 7–6 ^{(7–4)}
Runner-up	1–1	Sep 2007	China Open	Hard	(South Africa) Chris Haggard	(South Africa) Rik de Voest (Australia) Ashley Fisher	7–6^{(7–3)}, 0–6, [6–10]
Runner-up	1–2	Jan 2010	Chennai Open, India	Hard	(Serbia) Janko Tipsarević	(Spain) Marcel Granollers (Spain) Santiago Ventura	5–7, 2–6
Winner	2–2	Sep 2012	Thailand Open	Hard (i)	(Thailand) Danai Udomchoke	(United States) Eric Butorac (Australia) Paul Hanley	6–3, 6–4
Winner	3–2	Jan 2015	Chennai Open, India	Hard	(United Kingdom) Jonathan Marray	(South Africa) Raven Klaasen (India) Leander Paes	6–3, 7–6^{(7–4)}
Runner-up	3–3	May 2015	Geneva Open, Switzerland	Clay	(South Africa) Raven Klaasen	(Colombia) Juan Sebastián Cabal (Colombia) Robert Farah	5–7, 6–4, [7–10]

== ATP Challenger and ITF Futures finals ==
=== Singles: 56 (37–19) ===
Legend ATP Challenger Tour (29–17) ITF Futures Tour (8–2)	Finals by surface Hard (34–15) Clay (0–0) Grass (2–1) Carpet (1–3)

Result	W–L	Date	Tournament	Tier	Surface	Opponent	Score
Win	1–0	Oct 2001	Hong Kong F1, Hong Kong	Futures	Hard	(Indonesia) Peter Handoyo	6–3, 6–4
Loss	1–1	Nov 2001	Vietnam F1, Hanoi	Futures	Hard	(Pakistan) Aisam Qureshi	4–6, 3–4 ret.
Win	2–1	Feb 2002	Israel F1, Ramat HaSharon	Futures	Hard	(Israel) Nir Welgreen	6–4, 6–4
Win	3–1	Apr 2002	China F1, Kunming City	Futures	Hard	(France) Benjamin Cassaigne	6–4, 3–6, 7–6^{(7–5)}
Win	4–1	Apr 2002	China F2, Kunming City	Futures	Hard	(France) Benjamin Cassaigne	2–6, 7–6^{(8–6)}, 6–3
Win	5–1	Sep 2002	Japan F7, Saitama	Futures	Hard	(Japan) Takahiro Terachi	6–2, 6–2
Win	6–1	Apr 2003	China F1, Taizhou	Futures	Hard	(China) Zhu Benqiang	7–6^{(7–5)}, 6–2
Win	7–1	Sep 2003	Japan F6, Kashiwa	Futures	Hard	(Japan) Tasuku Iwami	6–1, 3–6, 6–1
Loss	7–2	Sep 2003	Japan F7, Saitama	Futures	Hard	(Japan) Takahiro Terachi	2–6, ret.
Win	8–2	Nov 2003	USA F30, Hammond	Futures	Hard	(United States) Lesley Joseph	6–2, 6–2
Win	9–2	Feb 2004	Joplin, United States	Challenger	Hard	(United States) Glenn Weiner	6–4, 6–2
Loss	9–3	Feb 2004	Ho Chi Minh City, Vietnam	Challenger	Hard	(United Kingdom) Arvind Parmar	3–6, 7–6^{(7–3)}, 3–6
Loss	9–4	Mar 2004	Kyoto, Japan	Challenger	Carpet	(Czech Republic) Michal Tabara	6–7^{(5–7)}, 3–4 ret.
Win	10–4	Mar 2004	Burnie, Australia	Challenger	Hard	(Sweden) Robert Lindstedt	6–3, 6–0
Loss	10–5	Apr 2004	Busan, South Korea	Challenger	Hard	(Austria) Alexander Peya	3–6, 7–5, 3–6
Loss	10–6	Apr 2004	Mexico City, Mexico	Challenger	Hard	(United States) Jeff Morrison	6–4, 6–7^{(3–7)}, 2–6
Win	11–6	Nov 2004	Caloundra, Australia	Challenger	Hard	(Japan) Takahiro Terachi	6–0, 7–5
Win	12–6	May 2005	Fergana, Uzbekistan	Challenger	Hard	(Thailand) Danai Udomchoke	6–1, 7–6^{(7–2)}
Loss	12–7	Jan 2006	Waikoloa, United States	Challenger	Hard	(Canada) Frank Dancevic	7–6^{(17–15)}, 2–6, 2–6
Loss	12–8	Mar 2006	Kyoto, Japan	Challenger	Carpet	(France) Nicolas Mahut	4–6, 1–6
Loss	12–9	Nov 2006	Rimouski, Canada	Challenger	Carpet	(Denmark) Kristian Pless	4–6, 6–7^{(5–7)}
Win	13–9	Nov 2006	Caloundra, Australia	Challenger	Hard	(Australia) Peter Luczak	6–3, 6–1
Loss	13–10	Nov 2006	Kawana, Australia	Challenger	Hard	(France) Julien Jeanpierre	3–6, 6–1, 4–6
Loss	13–11	Jul 2007	Granby, Canada	Challenger	Hard	(Japan) Takao Suzuki	4–6, 4–6
Loss	13–12	Oct 2007	Sacramento, United States	Challenger	Hard	(United States) Wayne Odesnik	2–6, 3–6
Win	14–12	Nov 2007	Kaohsiung, Taiwan	Challenger	Hard	(Israel) Dudi Sela	6–3, 6–3
Win	15–12	Jan 2008	Waikoloa, United States	Challenger	Hard	(United States) Vince Spadea	6–2, 6–0
Loss	15–13	Apr 2008	Busan, South Korea	Challenger	Hard	(Japan) Go Soeda	2–6, ret.
Loss	15–14	May 2008	Lanzarote, Spain	Challenger	Hard	(Switzerland) Stéphane Bohli	3–6, 4–6
Win	16–14	May 2008	New Delhi, India	Challenger	Hard	(United States) Brendan Evans	5–7, 7–6^{(7–5)}, 6–3
Loss	16–15	May 2008	New Delhi, India	Challenger	Hard	(Japan) Go Soeda	3–6, 6–3, 4–6
Win	17–15	Oct 2008	Tashkent, Uzbekistan	Challenger	Hard	(France) Mathieu Montcourt	6–3, 6–2
Win	18–15	May 2009	Ramat HaSharon, Israel	Challenger	Hard	(Germany) Benjamin Becker	6–3, 3–1 ret.
Win	19–15	Nov 2009	Chuncheon, South Korea	Challenger	Hard	(Netherlands) Igor Sijsling	6–2, 6–3
Win	20–15	Apr 2010	Athens, Greece	Challenger	Hard	(Germany) Rainer Schüttler	3–6, 7–6^{(7–3)}, 6–4
Loss	20–16	May 2010	Busan, South Korea	Challenger	Hard	(South Korea) Lim Yong-kyu	1–6, 4–6
Win	21–16	Oct 2010	Seoul, South Korea	Challenger	Hard	(South Africa) Kevin Anderson	6–3, 6–4
Win	22–16	Sep 2011	Ningbo, China	Challenger	Hard	(Estonia) Jürgen Zopp	6–2, 3–6, 6–1
Win	23–16	Oct 2011	Seoul, South Korea	Challenger	Hard	(Chinese Taipei) Jimmy Wang	7–5, 6–3
Win	24–16	Mar 2012	Singapore, Singapore	Challenger	Hard	(Japan) Go Soeda	6–3, 6–4
Win	25–16	Sep 2012	Shanghai, China	Challenger	Hard	(Germany) Peter Gojowczyk	7–5, 6–0
Win	26–16	Oct 2012	Seoul, South Korea	Challenger	Hard	(Japan) Yūichi Sugita	6–3, 7–6^{(7–4)}
Win	27–16	Jul 2013	Beijing, China	Challenger	Hard	(Japan) Go Soeda	6–2, 6–4
Win	28–16	Sep 2013	Kaohsiung, Taiwan	Challenger	Hard	(India) Yuki Bhambri	6–4, 6–3
Win	29–16	Jul 2014	Kaohsiung, Taiwan	Challenger	Hard	(Italy) Luca Vanni	6–7^{(7–9)}, 6–4, 6–4
Win	30–16	Oct 2015	Ningbo, China	Challenger	Hard	(Estonia) Jürgen Zopp	7–6^{(7–3)}, 6–1
Loss	30–17	May 2016	Seoul, South Korea	Challenger	Hard	(Ukraine) Sergiy Stakhovsky	6–4, 3–6, 6–7^{(7–9)}
Loss	30–18	Jun 2016	Manchester, Great Britain	Challenger	Grass	(Germany) Dustin Brown	6–7^{(5–7)}, 1–6
Win	31–18	Jun 2016	Surbiton, Great Britain	Challenger	Grass	(Romania) Marius Copil	7–5, 7–6^{(13-11)}
Win	32–18	Jun 2016	Ilkley, Great Britain	Challenger	Grass	(France) Vincent Millot	7–6^{(7–4)}, 6–2
Win	33–18	Oct 2016	Ningbo, China	Challenger	Hard	(Japan) Hiroki Moriya	6–3, 6–1
Win	34–18	Oct 2016	Suzhou, China	Challenger	Hard	(United States) Stefan Kozlov	6–0, 6–1
Win	35–18	Apr 2017	Taipei, Taiwan	Challenger	Carpet	(Japan) Tatsuma Ito	6–1, 7–6^{(7–4)}
Win	36–18	Aug 2017	Chengdu, China	Challenger	Hard	(Russia) Evgeny Donskoy	6–3, 6–4
Win	37–18	Aug 2017	Jinan, China	Challenger	Hard	(Lithuania) Ričardas Berankis	6–3, 6–1
Loss	37–19	Sep 2017	Shanghai, China	Challenger	Hard	(China) Wu Yibing	6–7^{(6–8)}, ret.

=== Doubles: 31 (19–12) ===
Legend ATP Challenger Tour (13–6) ITF Futures Tour (6–6)	Finals by surface Hard (18–11) Clay (0–0) Grass (0–0) Carpet (1–1)

Result	W–L	Date	Tournament	Tier	Surface	Partner	Opponents	Score
Loss	0–1	Nov 2001	Thailand F1, Pattaya	Futures	Hard	(Germany) Frank Moser	(Indonesia) Peter Handoyo (South Africa) Raven Klaasen	3–6, 2–6
Win	1–1	Nov 2001	Thailand F2, Nonthaburi	Futures	Hard	(Germany) Frank Moser	(South Africa) Rik de Voest (South Africa) Johan Du Randt	6–2, 6–4
Loss	1–2	Nov 2001	Vietnam F1, Hanoi	Futures	Hard	(Germany) Frank Moser	(Israel) Lior Dahan (South Africa) Rik de Voest	walkover
Win	2–2	Feb 2002	United Arab Emirates F2, Abu Dhabi	Futures	Hard	(India) Rohan Bopanna	(Slovakia) Tomas Janci (Slovakia) Roman Kukal	7–5, 7–5
Win	3–2	Feb 2002	Israel F1, Ramat HaSharon	Futures	Hard	(Israel) Lior Dahan	(Czech Republic) Josef Neštický (Israel) Nir Welgreen	7–5, 6–4
Loss	3–3	Apr 2002	China F2, Kunming City	Futures	Hard	(Hong Kong) John Hui	(China) Yang Jing-Zhu (China) Zhu Benqiang	6–7^{(4–7)}, 7–6^{(7–5)}, 4–6
Win	4–3	May 2002	Japan F4, Fukuoka	Futures	Hard	(Hong Kong) John Hui	(Greece) Niko Karagiannis (South Africa) Wesley Moodie	6–3, 5–7, 6–4
Win	5–3	Jun 2002	Japan F5, Fukuoka	Futures	Hard	(Japan) Hiroki Kondo	(Japan) Michihisa Onoda (Japan) Masahide Sakamoto	6–2, 6–1
Loss	5–4	Jul 2002	Campos do Jordão, Brazil	Challenger	Hard	(Thailand) Danai Udomchoke	(Mexico) Alejandro Hernández (Brazil) Daniel Melo	walkover
Loss	5–5	Sep 2002	Japan F6, Kashiwa	Futures	Hard	(Japan) Toshihide Matsui	(Indonesia) Peter Handoyo (Indonesia) Suwandi Suwandi	3–6, 2–6
Loss	5–6	Nov 2002	Hong Kong F2, Hong Kong	Futures	Hard	(Hong Kong) John Hui	(Netherlands) Fred Hemmes (Japan) Jun Kato	3–6, 6–7^{(2–7)}
Win	6–6	Dec 2002	Yokohama, Japan	Challenger	Carpet	(Thailand) Danai Udomchoke	(Croatia) Ivo Karlović (Australia) Mark Nielsen	7–6^{(7–5)}, 6–3
Win	7–6	Jul 2003	Granby, Canada	Challenger	Hard	(Thailand) Danai Udomchoke	(Brazil) Josh Goffi (United States) Ryan Sachire	6–7^{(4–7)}, 6–4, 7–6^{(7–0)}
Loss	7–7	Sep 2003	Japan F7, Saitama	Futures	Hard	(Australia) Mark Nielsen	(Japan) Kentaro Masuda (Japan) Takahiro Terachi	6–4, 3–3 ret.
Win	8–7	Nov 2003	USA F30, Hammond	Futures	Hard	(Brazil) Bruno Soares	(United States) Amer Delić (United States) Bobby Reynolds	6–4, 6–4
Win	9–7	Nov 2003	Austin, United States	Challenger	Hard	(United States) Jason Marshall	(Brazil) Josh Goffi (United States) Tripp Phillips	6–2, 2–6, 6–3
Win	10–7	Feb 2004	Joplin, United States	Challenger	Hard	(Brazil) Bruno Soares	(United States) Rajeev Ram (United States) Brian Baker	3–6, 6–1, 6–1
Loss	10–8	Mar 2004	Kyoto, Japan	Challenger	Carpet	(United States) Jason Marshall	(Netherlands) Fred Hemmes (South Africa) Rik de Voest	3–6, 7–6^{(10–8)}, 4–6
Win	11–8	Mar 2004	Burnie, Australia	Challenger	Hard	(South Africa) Rik de Voest	(Italy) Leonardo Azzaro (Austria) Oliver Marach	6–3, 1–6, 7–5
Loss	11–9	Apr 2004	Mexico City, Mexico	Challenger	Hard	(Thailand) Danai Udomchoke	(Australia) Nathan Healey (Finland) Tuomas Ketola	5–7, 6–7^{(6–8)}
Win	12–9	Nov 2004	Caloundra, Australia	Challenger	Hard	(Australia) Luke Bourgeois	(Australia) Mark Hlawaty (Australia) Shannon Nettle	7–6^{(7–2)}, 7–5
Win	13–9	Nov 2004	Helsinki, Finland	Challenger	Hard	(Sweden) Robert Lindstedt	(Italy) Gianluca Bazzica (Italy) Massimo Dell'Acqua	6–2, 6–2
Loss	13–10	May 2005	Fergana, Uzbekistan	Challenger	Hard	(Thailand) Danai Udomchoke	(Uzbekistan) Murad Inoyatov (Uzbekistan) Denis Istomin	1–6, 3–6
Win	14–10	Jul 2005	Granby, Canada	Challenger	Hard	(Sweden) Johan Landsberg	(Canada) Philip Bester (Canada) Frank Dancevic	4–6, 7–6^{(7–5)}, 7–5
Win	15–10	Feb 2006	Burnie, Australia	Challenger	Hard	(Australia) Luke Bourgeois	(Australia) Raphael Durek (Australia) Alun Jones	6–3, 6–2
Loss	15–11	Apr 2006	Chikmagalur, India	Challenger	Hard	(Thailand) Danai Udomchoke	(Thailand) Sonchat Ratiwatana (Thailand) Sanchai Ratiwatana	3–6, 2–6
Loss	15–12	Jul 2006	Granby, Canada	Challenger	Hard	(Germany) Frank Moser	(Canada) Alessandro Gravina (France) Gary Lugassy	2–6, 6–7^{(2–7)}
Win	16–12	Oct 2007	Seoul, South Korea	Challenger	Hard	(South Africa) Rik de Voest	(Thailand) Sonchat Ratiwatana (Thailand) Sanchai Ratiwatana	6–3, 7–5
Win	17–12	Nov 2009	Seoul, South Korea	Challenger	Hard	(South Africa) Rik de Voest	(Thailand) Sonchat Ratiwatana (Thailand) Sanchai Ratiwatana	7–6^{(7–5)}, 3–6, [10–6]
Win	18–12	Apr 2010	Athens, Greece	Challenger	Hard	(South Africa) Rik de Voest	(Netherlands) Robin Haase (Netherlands) Igor Sijsling	6–3, 6–4
Win	19–12	Nov 2015	Hua Hin, Thailand	Challenger	Hard	(Chinese Taipei) Lee Hsin-han	(Germany) Andre Begemann (India) Purav Raja	walkover

== Performance timelines ==
Key
W	F	SF	QF	#R	RR	Q#	DNQ	A	NH

(W) winner; (F) finalist; (SF) semifinalist; (QF) quarterfinalist; (#R) rounds 4, 3, 2, 1; (RR) round-robin stage; (Q#) qualification round; (DNQ) did not qualify; (A) absent; (NH) not held; (SR) strike rate (events won / competed); (W–L) win–loss record.

=== Singles ===
Tournament	2001	2002	2003	2004	2005	2006	2007	2008	2009	2010	2011	2012	2013	2014	2015	2016	2017	2018	2019	2020	2021	SR	W–L	Win %
Grand Slam tournaments
Australian Open	A	A	Q1	Q1	1R	1R	2R	1R	3R	1R	1R	3R	2R	2R	1R	A	1R	A	A	1R	1R	0 / 14	7–14	33%
French Open	A	A	A	Q2	A	A	1R	A	1R	1R	1R	1R	2R^{1}	1R	2R	1R	1R	A	A	A	1R	0 / 11	2–10	17%
Wimbledon	A	A	Q1	2R	2R	1R	1R	1R	1R	QF	3R	1R	2R	2R	1R	2R	1R	A	A	NH	1R	0 / 15	11–15	42%
US Open	A	Q1	Q1	1R	A	A	A	2R	1R	1R	1R	1R	2R	1R	1R	1R	2R	A	A	A	A	0 / 11	3–11	21%
Win–loss	0–0	0–0	0–0	1–2	1–2	0–2	1–3	1–3	2–4	4–4	2–4	2–4	4–3	2–4	1–4	1–3	1–4	0–0	0–0	0–1	0–3	0 / 51	23–50	32%
Olympic Games
Summer Olympics	Not Held			1R	Not Held			3R	Not Held			1R	Not Held			1R	Not Held				1R	0 / 5	2–5	29%
ATP Tour Masters 1000
Indian Wells Masters	A	A	A	A	A	A	A	1R	2R	2R	2R	1R	3R	3R	1R	A	1R	A	A	NH	A	0 / 9	7–9	44%
Miami Open	A	A	A	A	A	A	A	1R	2R	2R	2R	2R	2R	2R	1R	A	2R	A	A	NH	2R	0 / 10	8–10	44%
Monte-Carlo Masters	A	A	A	A	A	A	A	A	A	A	A	A	A	2R	A	A	A	A	A	NH	A	0 / 1	1–1	50%
Madrid Open^{2}	A	A	A	A	Q1	A	A	A	A	A	2R	A	A	A	A	A	A	A	A	NH	A	0 / 1	1–1	50%
Italian Open	A	A	A	Q1	A	A	A	A	A	A	A	A	A	A	A	A	A	A	A	A	A	0 / 0	0–0	N/A
Canadian Open	A	A	A	Q1	A	A	A	Q1	1R	3R	1R	1R	1R	2R	1R	2R	A	A	A	NH	A	0 / 8	4–8	33%
Cincinnati Masters	A	A	A	1R	A	A	A	A	1R	1R	A	2R	Q1	3R	1R	Q1	A	A	A	A	A	0 / 6	3–6	33%
Shanghai Masters	Not ATP Masters Series								A	2R	1R	2R	Q2	2R	1R	Q2	Q2	A	A	NH		0 / 5	3–5	38%
Paris Masters	A	A	A	A	A	A	A	A	A	A	A	A	A	1R	A	A	A	A	A	A	A	0 / 1	0–1	0%
Win–loss	0–0	0–0	0–0	0–1	0–0	0–0	0–0	0–2	2–4	5–5	3–5	3–5	3–3	8–7	0–5	1–1	1–2	0–0	0–0	0–0	1–1	0 / 41	27–41	40%
Career statistics
Titles / finals	0 / 0	0 / 0	0 / 0	0 / 0	0 / 0	0 / 0	0 / 0	0 / 0	0 / 0	0 / 0	0 / 0	0 / 0	0 / 0	0 / 1	0 / 0	0 / 0	0 / 0	0 / 0	0 / 0	0 / 0	0 / 0	0 / 1		
Overall win–loss	2–1	0–0	3–2	5–10	6–8	2–7	7–15	11–15	10–23	15–20	12–21	12–18	17–17	24–21	19–21	7–9	9–14	0–0	0–0	0–2	1–7	162–231		
Win %	67%	N/A	60%	33%	43%	22%	32%	42%	30%	43%	36%	40%	50%	53%	48%	44%	39%	N/A	N/A	0%	13%	41.22%		
Year-end ranking	543	192	190	87	158	89	110	64	98	35	82	59	65	38	77	64	71	532	–	1008	568	$5,179,843		

^{1}At the 2013 French Open, Lu withdrew prior to the second round.
^{2}Held as Hamburg Masters until 2008, Madrid Masters (clay) 2009 – present.

=== Doubles ===
Tournament	2005	2006	2007	2008	2009	2010	2011	2012	2013	2014	2015	2016	2017	2018	2019	2020	2021	SR	W–L
Grand Slam tournaments
Australian Open	3R	A	1R	A	1R	1R	2R	A	2R	1R	1R	A	1R	A	A	1R	1R	0 / 11	4–11
French Open	A	A	A	A	1R	A	1R	2R	1R	1R	1R	A	1R	A	A	A	2R	0 / 8	2–8
Wimbledon	A	A	A	A	1R	3R	A	2R	1R	1R	2R	1R	A	A	A	NH	1R	0 / 8	4–8
US Open	A	A	A	1R	3R	1R	A	1R	2R	2R	A	2R	2R	A	A	A	A	0 / 8	6–8
Win–loss	2–1	0–0	0–1	0–1	2–4	2–3	1–2	2–2	2–4	1–4	1–3	1–2	1–3	0–0	0–0	0–1	1–3	0 / 33	16–34
Career statistics
Titles / finals	1 / 1	0 / 0	0 / 1	0 / 0	0 / 0	0 / 1	0 / 0	1 / 1	0 / 0	0 / 0	1 / 2	0 / 0	0 / 0	0 / 0	0 / 0	0 / 0	0 / 0	3 / 6	
Year-end ranking	116	205	223	794	177	88	208	144	194	577	117	462	235	–	–	–	525		

== Wins over top 10 players ==
Yen-hsun has a 7–29 record against players who were, at the time the match was played, ranked in the top 10.

Season	2001	2002	2003	2004	2005	2006	2007	2008	2009	2010	2011	2012	2013	2014	2015	2016	2017	2018	2019	2020	2021	Total
Wins	0	0	0	1	0	0	0	1	0	1	0	2	0	2	0	0	0	0	0	0	0	7

#	Player	Rank	Event	Surface	Round	Score
2004
1.	(Argentina) Guillermo Coria	3	London, England	Grass	2R	6–2, 6–4
2008
2.	(United Kingdom) Andy Murray	6	Beijing, China	Hard	1R	7–6^{(7–5)}, 6–4
2010
3.	(United States) Andy Roddick	7	Wimbledon, England	Grass	4R	4–6, 7–6^{(7–3)}, 7–6^{(7–4)}, 6–7^{(5–7)}, 9–7
2012
4.	(Serbia) Janko Tipsarević	8	London, England	Grass	3R	6–3, 2–6, 7–6^{(7–5)}
5.	(Spain) David Ferrer	5	Beijing, China	Hard	1R	5–4 ret.
2014
6.	(Spain) David Ferrer	3	Auckland, New Zealand	Hard	SF	6–4, 7–6^{(7–4)}
7.	(Czech Republic) Tomáš Berdych	5	Cincinnati, United States	Hard	2R	3–6, 6–3, 6–4

== Equipment ==
Lu was sponsored by adidas (apparel and shoes), Head (rackets), Chunghwa Telecom and CPC Corporation. On court, Lu used a Head IG Extreme Pro racket, Signum Poly Pro strings, and a Tournagrip overgrip.

== See also ==
- Sport in Taiwan
- List of flag bearers for Chinese Taipei at the Olympics

Olympic Games
Preceded by Wong I-sheau	Flagbearer for Chinese Taipei (with Kuo Hsing-chun); Tokyo 2020	Succeeded by Incumbent
