= Tai William =

Taiwanese speed skater

Personal information
- Nationality: Taiwanese
- Born: 30 March 1997 (age 28)
- Height: 1.74 m (5 ft 9 in)
- Weight: 65 kg (143 lb)

Sport
- Sport: Speed skating

Tai William
- Simplified Chinese: 戴玮麟
- Traditional Chinese: 戴瑋麟
Transcriptions
Standard Mandarin
- Hanyu Pinyin: Dài Wěilín
- IPA: [tâɪ wèɪ lǐn]

Tai William (Chinese: 戴瑋麟; pinyin: Dài Wěilín; Mandarin pronunciation: [tâɪ wèɪ lǐn]; born 30 March 1997) is a Taiwanese speed skater. He competed in the 2018 Winter Olympics.
