= Lee Chen-tan =

Taiwanese bobsledder

Personal information
- Nationality: Taiwanese
- Born: 29 January 1966 (age 59)

Sport
- Sport: Bobsleigh

Lee Chen-tan (born 29 January 1966) is a Taiwanese bobsledder. He competed in the two man and the four man events at the 1988 Winter Olympics.
