= Mackenzie Blackburn =

Taiwanese short track speed skater

Personal information
- Born: November 10, 1992 (age 33) Calgary, Alberta, Canada

Sport
- Country: Taiwan
- Sport: Short track speed skating

Mackenzie Blackburn (Chinese: 呂明龍; Wade–Giles: Lü^{3} Ming^{2}-lung^{2}, born November 10, 1992) is a Canadian-born Chinese Taipei short track speed skater who has competed for the latter since 2008. Blackburn has also qualified to compete for Chinese Taipei at the 2014 Winter Olympics in Sochi, Russia. By doing so he became the first athlete to qualify from Taiwan in short track speed skating.

Although Blackburn was born in Canada, he is able to compete for Chinese Taipei because of his mother's birthplace.

== Personal records ==
| Distance | Nation | City | Date | Record Time |
|---|---|---|---|---|
| 500 meters | Canada | Calgary | October 19, 2012 | 40.830 |
| 1000 meters | Canada | Calgary | October 20, 2012 | 1:26.540 |
| 1500 meters | Russia | Kolomna | November 14, 2013 | 2:18.578 |
