= Huang Liu-chong =

Taiwanese luger (born 1950)

Personal information
- Nationality: Taiwanese
- Born: 1 March 1950 (age 75)

Sport
- Sport: Luge

Huang Liu-chong (born 1 March 1950) is a Taiwanese luger. He competed in the men's singles and doubles events at the 1976 Winter Olympics.
