= Wu Chung-chou =

Taiwanese bobsledder

Personal information
- Nationality: Taiwanese
- Born: 1 August 1956 (age 68); Hsinchu, Taiwan

Sport
- Sport: Bobsleigh

Wu Chung-chou (born 1 August 1956) is a Taiwanese bobsledder. He competed in the two man and the four man events at the 1984 Winter Olympics.
