= Henry Hsu =

Taiwanese athlete and politician

Henry Hsu OBE MLY
- 徐亨
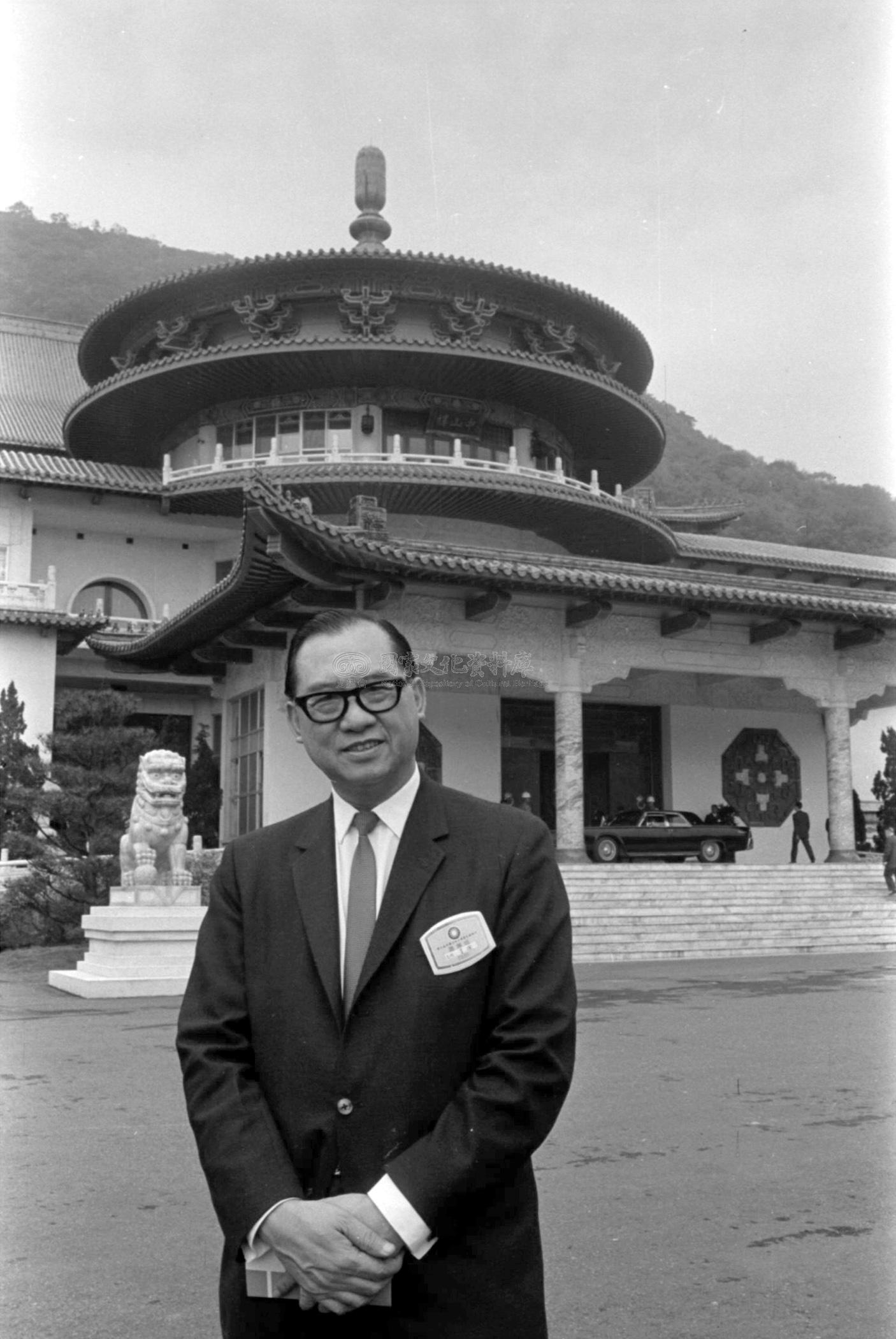
- Hsu in 1969

President of the Republic of China Olympic Committee
- In office 17 July 1973 – May 1974
- Preceded by: Yang Sen
- Succeeded by: Shen Chia-ming

Member of the Legislative Yuan
- In office 1 February 1973 – 31 January 1987
- Constituency: Overseas Chinese District 2 (Hong Kong and Macau)

Personal details
- Born: 6 December 1912 Hua County, Guangzhou, China
- Died: 3 February 2009 (aged 96) Beitou, Taipei, Taiwan
- Party: Kuomintang
- Education: Whampoa Military Academy; National Chi Nan University (LLB)

Military service
- Allegiance: Republic of China
- Branch/service: Republic of China Navy
- Rank: Rear admiral
- Battles/wars: World War II: Battle of Hong Kong

Chinese name
- Chinese: 徐亨
Transcriptions
Standard Mandarin
- Hanyu Pinyin: Xú Hēng
- Bopomofo: ㄒㄩˊ ㄏㄥ
- Wade–Giles: Hsü^{2} Hêng^{1}
Hakka
- Pha̍k-fa-sṳ: Chhì Hên
Yue: Cantonese
- Jyutping: Ceoi^{4} Hang^{1}
Southern Min
- Hokkien POJ: Chhî Heng
- Tâi-lô: Tshî Hing

Henry Hsu OBE (Chinese: 徐亨; pinyin: Xú Hēng; Wade–Giles: Hsu^{2} Hêng^{1}; 6 December 1912 – 3 February 2009) was a Chinese naval officer, athlete and politician.

== Life and career ==
Hsu was born in Hua County, China, and had planned to follow his parents into the medical field, until his mother's death in a hotel fire when Hsu was eighteen. Upon graduation from Whampoa Military Academy, Hsu pursued legal studies in Shanghai. He represented the Republic of China at the 1930 and 1934 Far Eastern Championship Games, as a volleyball player and footballer, respectively. Hsu also competed as a swimmer and water polo player. During World War II, Hsu served in the Republic of China Navy. At the time of the Battle of Hong Kong, he was a Lieutenant-Commander and aide-de-camp to Admiral Chan Chak. Hsu saved Admiral Chan's life during a dramatic breakout in five small torpedo boats on Christmas Day 1941, which saved a total of sixty eight Chinese, British Raj and Danish intelligence, naval and marine personnel from the Japanese in Hong Kong; for this feat he was made an Honorary Officer of the Order of the British Empire in 1942. Hsu retired from duty with the rank of Rear Admiral. He then owned hotels in Hong Kong, soon expanding operations to Taiwan when he moved there in 1982, and later to the United States in 1992.

He was a member of the International Olympic Committee from 1970 to 1988, and led the Republic of China Olympic Committee from 1973 to 1974. Hsu was first appointed to the Legislative Yuan, Taiwan's unicameral legislature, in 1972 and served until 1987. Upon stepping down from the legislature, he was named a national policy adviser to President Chiang Ching-kuo, and also served Chiang's successor Lee Teng-hui until 2000. Alongside his position as an adviser, Hsu served a nearly concurrent term as president of the Red Cross Society of the Republic of China from 1988 to 2000.

He died of heart failure at the age of 96 in 2009, while being treated for uremia and pneumonia at Taipei Veterans General Hospital. His funeral was held on 16 March, with Ma Ying-jeou, Liu Chao-shiuan, Wang Jin-pyng, Wu Ching-kuo, and Chi Cheng in attendance.
