= Cheng Jin-shan =

Taiwanese bobsledder

Personal information
- Nationality: Taiwanese
- Born: 4 April 1974 (age 50)

Sport
- Sport: Bobsleigh

Cheng Jin-shan (born 4 April 1974) is a Taiwanese bobsledder. He competed in the two man and the four man events at the 1998 Winter Olympics.
