= Wu Dien-cheng =

Taiwanese bobsledder

Personal information
- Nationality: Taiwanese
- Born: 18 January 1959 (age 66); Hsinchu, Taiwan

Sport
- Sport: Bobsleigh

Wu Dien-cheng (born 18 January 1959) is a Taiwanese bobsledder. He competed in the two man and the four man events at the 1984 Winter Olympics.
