= National flower of Taiwan =

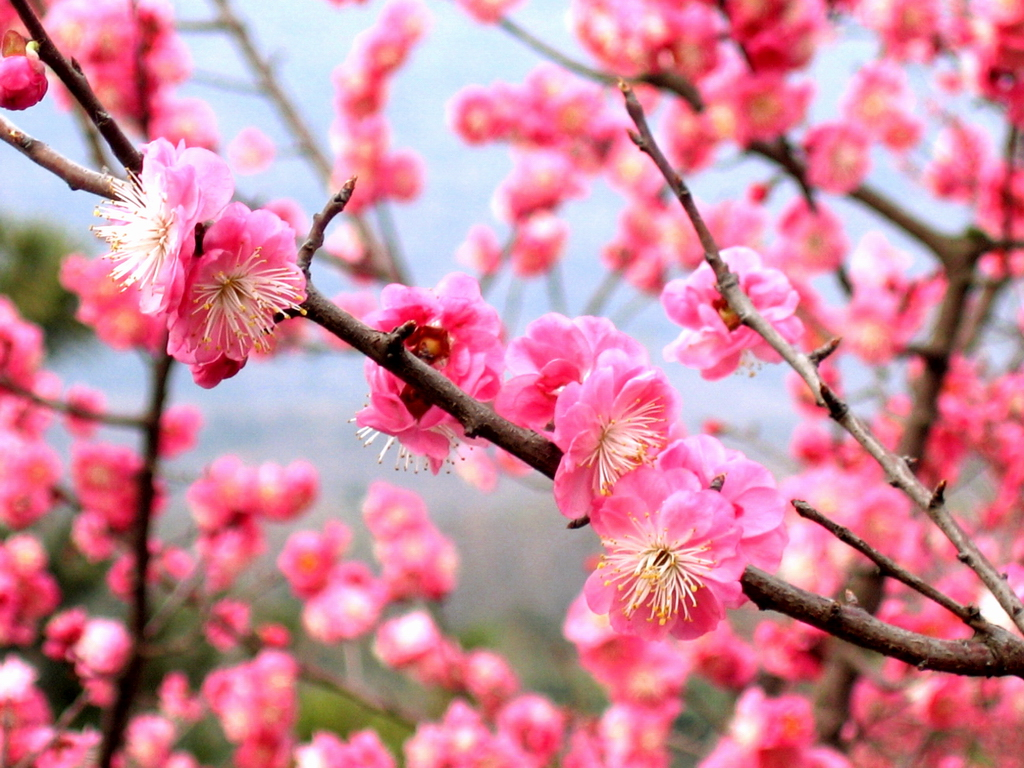
Plum blossom (梅花)

The national flower of Taiwan was officially designated as the plum blossom by the Executive Yuan of Taiwan on 21 July 1964. The plum blossom, known as the meihua (Chinese: 梅花; pinyin: méihuā), is a symbol for resilience and perseverance in the face of adversity, because plum blossoms often bloom most vibrantly even amidst the harsh winter snow. As the plum tree can usually grow for a long time, ancient trees are found throughout China. Huangmei county (Yellow Mei) in Hubei features a 1,600-year-old plum tree from the Jin Dynasty which is still flowering. The three stamens represents Dr. Sun Yat-sen's Three Principles of the People, while the five petals symbolize the five branches of the government: Executive Yuan, Legislative Yuan, Judicial Yuan, Examination Yuan and Control Yuan. The flower has also been proposed to be one of the national flowers for the People's Republic of China.

== History ==
The mudan (Paeonia suffruticosa) was referred to as the "national flower" of China during the Ming and Qing era. It was still recognised by many to be the national flower during the Beiyang government era, amidst calls to designate other flowers such as the Chrysanthemum to be the national symbol.

The Ceremony and Uniform Review Committee of the Ministry of the Interior (MOI), Nationalist Government in 1928 proposed that the plum blossom be the National Flower; the Ministry of Education (MOE) reviewed the proposal and assented to it. The Ministry of Finance (MOF) had also requested the Central Executive Committee (CEC) of the Kuomintang (Nationalist Party) to designate the National Flower for the making of new currency. On 28 January 1929, the CEC adopted a resolution to use the plum blossom for various emblems of the state, but regarding the designation of the National Flower, they decided to list it as one of the agendas of the party's 3rd National Congress. The Nationalist Government issued a general order on 8 February 1929, adopting the plum blossom in various state emblem designs. Despite the designation not being approved during the 3rd National Congress, the plum blossom has been widely accepted by society as the symbol of the nation.

In 1964, the MOI advised the Executive Yuan to stipulate it as the National Flower; the latter, in a reply on 21 July 1964, stated that the plum blossom as the national flower "has long been recognised nationwide", and that there was "no need to make an announcement or a press release". The plum blossom was thus recognised by the Executive Yuan as the National Flower of the Republic of China (the country's effective jurisdiction was reduced to Taiwan after the Chinese Civil War) as an established fact.

== Symbolism ==
As the National Flower, the plum blossom symbolises:

- Three buds and five petals - symbolises Three Principles of the People and the five branches of the Government in accordance with the Constitution
- The plum blossom withstands the cold winter (it blossoms more in colder temperatures) - it symbolises the faithful, the resolute and the holy; it represents the national spirit of Taiwanese nationals.
- The five petals of the flower - symbolises Five Races Under One Union; it also symbolises Five Cardinal Relationships (Wǔlún), Five Constants (Wǔcháng) and Five Ethics (Wǔjiào) according to Confucian philosophy (national philosophy of imperial China for two millennia until 1912, when the Qing Dynasty was overthrown and the Republic of China was established)
- The branches (枝橫), shadow (影斜), flexibility (曳疏), and cold resistance (傲霜) of the plum blossom also represent the four kinds of noble virtues, "originating and penetrating, advantageous and firm" mentioned in the I Ching (Book of Changes).

== Use of the symbol ==
As one of the national symbols of Republic of China, the plum blossom design has often been utilised on logos used by the ROC government. This includes the emblem of the Office of the President and the Chinese Taipei Olympic flag (also known as "Plum Blossom Banner"), which Republic of China uses in place of the Republic of China flag during international sports events, due to political reasons.

Furthermore, the plum blossom design is also part of:

- the rank insignia of senior officers in the Republic of China Armed Forces
- Obverse side of NT$0.5 coin
- Reverse side of NT$10 coin
- Watermark of New Taiwan dollar paper notes
Republic of China plum blossom symbol basic form

Seal of the president of Republic of China

Chinese Taipei Olympic flag

Symbol of the Sun Yat-sen Freeway

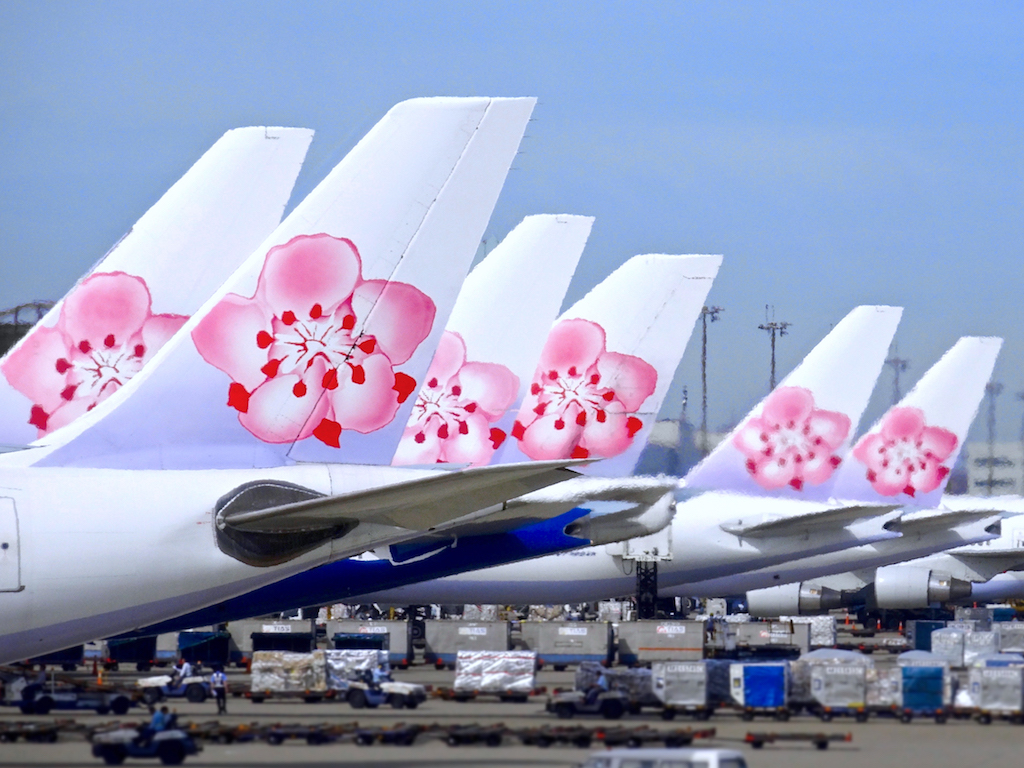
China Airlines aircraft tails feature plum blossoms

== Controversy ==
The national flower of Taiwan has been a subject of debate and varying interpretations, as Taiwan is not a natural habitat for plum blossoms, and many Taiwanese people have never personally encountered the flower. This has led to controversy over its designation as the national flower.

In early 1997, the Taiwan Nation-Building Party (Jianguo Party) organized a campaign to select a flower that truly represents Taiwan. Among ten native plant species, including the Taiwan lily (Lilium formosanum), Yushan rhododendron (Rhododendron pseudochrysanthum), Taiwan edelweiss (Leontopodium microphyllum), and Taiwan golden-rayed lily (Lilium auratum var. formosanum), the Taiwan lily was ultimately chosen as the national flower of Taiwan. Poet Li Min-yong wrote The Song of the Lily, which was later composed into music by Tyzen Hsiao, to celebrate the lily as a symbol of the Taiwanese people's perseverance and pursuit of democracy.

Other flowers have also been proposed as potential national symbols, including the orchid, sunflower, tung blossom, osmanthus, camellia, magnolia, Yushan rhododendron, common periwinkle, Taiwan incense cedar, mountain cherry blossom, wild ginger lily, and Taiwan red cypress.

== See also ==
- Flag of Taiwan
- National symbols of Taiwan
- Prunus mei
