= Shieh Wei-cheng =

Taiwanese luger (born 1956)

Personal information
- Nationality: Taiwanese
- Born: 26 September 1956 (age 68)

Sport
- Sport: Luge

Shieh Wei-cheng (born 26 September 1956) is a Taiwanese luger. He competed in the men's singles and doubles events at the 1976 Winter Olympics.
