= Teng Pi-hui =

Taiwanese luger

Personal information
- Nationality: Taiwanese
- Born: 13 June 1961 (age 63)

Sport
- Sport: Luge

Teng Pi-hui (born 13 June 1961) is a Taiwanese luger. She competed at the 1984 Winter Olympics and the 1988 Winter Olympics.
