= Chinese Taipei at the Olympics =

- Chinese Taipei Olympic flag
- IOC code: TPE
- NOC: Chinese Taipei Olympic Committee
- Website: www.tpenoc.net (in Chinese and English)
- Medals Ranked 63rd: Gold 9 Silver 11 Bronze 23 Total 43

Summer appearances
- 1956; 1960; 1964; 1968; 1972; 1976–1980; 1984; 1988; 1992; 1996; 2000; 2004; 2008; 2012; 2016; 2020; 2024

Winter appearances
- 1972; 1976; 1980; 1984; 1988; 1992; 1994; 1998; 2002; 2006; 2010; 2014; 2018; 2022; 2026

Other related appearances
- Republic of China (1924–1948)

Taiwan, officially the Republic of China (ROC), competes as "Chinese Taipei" (TPE) at the Olympic Games since 1984. Athletes compete under the flag of the Chinese Taipei Olympic Committee instead of the flag of the Republic of China; for any medal ceremony, the National Flag Anthem of the Republic of China is played instead of the National Anthem of the Republic of China.

Taiwanese athletes won their first Olympic medal in 1960, and their first gold medal in 2004. Taiwan achieved their highest total medal count at the 2020 games.

== Timeline of participation ==
Olympic Year/s	Teams				
Olympic Year/s	Mainland China			Taiwan	
1924	China		(Chine)	as part of Japan (Note: Kinmen and Matsu have been part of the Republic of China for all Olympics.)	
1932–1936	Republic of China	China	(CHN)	as part of Japan	
1948	Republic of China		(CHN)		
1952	People's Republic of China	People's Republic of China (PRC)			
1956				Republic of China	Formosa-China (CHN)
1960				Republic of China	Formosa (RCF)
1964–1968				Republic of China	Taiwan (TWN)
1972–1976 W				Republic of China	Republic of China (ROC)
1980 W	People's Republic of China	People's Republic of China (CHN)			
1984–present	People's Republic of China	People's Republic of China (CHN)		Chinese Taipei for Olympic games	Chinese Taipei (TPE)

== Timeline concerning Olympic recognition ==
The following timeline concerns the different names and principal events concerning recognition of the Republic of China (ROC) Olympic team:

- 1922 – The China National Amateur Athletic Federation is recognised by the International Olympic Committee (IOC) as the National Olympic Committee in China.
- 1932 – ROC competes in the Olympics for the first time as China.
- 1949 – The China National Amateur Athletic Federation moves to Taiwan.
- 1952 – ROC team withdraws from the Helsinki Olympics because the IOC permits the People's Republic of China (PRC) to participate.
- 1954 – IOC adopts a resolution officially recognising the PRC's Chinese Olympic Committee.
- 1956 – ROC represents at Melbourne Games as the Republic of China. PRC withdraws from the Games in protest because two Chinese Olympic Committees are in the list of IOC members.
- 1958 – PRC withdraws from Olympic movement and all federations governing Olympic sports. Professor Dong Shouyi, an IOC member for the PRC resigns.
- 1959 – IOC informs the ROC that they do not control sport on Mainland China, rules determine the ROC will no longer be recognised under the "Chinese Olympic Committee" title. All applications under a different name would be considered.
- 1960 – ROC committee is renamed the "Olympic Committee of the Republic of China", and so recognised.
- 1963 – IOC recognizes the name "Taiwan", and the NOC is allowed to use the initials "ROC" on sports outfits.
- 1968 – IOC agrees to renaming the Taiwan team as the Republic of China after the 1968 Games and to its participation under that banner.
- 1976 – ROC is not permitted to participate in the Montreal Summer Games, as long as it insists on the name of Republic of China, because the host country, Canada, recognises the PRC as the sole legitimate government of China.
- 1979 – IOC recognises the Chinese Olympic Committee as the official representative of China. The IOC decision is followed by a postal ballot among 89 members. Under the IOC decision, the ROC's Olympics committee would be renamed as "Chinese Taipei Olympic Committee" and is not allowed to use the ROC's national anthem or flag.
- 1980 – ROC boycotts the Lake Placid Winter Games and the Moscow Summer Games due to the decision to use the name Chinese Taipei in international sporting events.
- 1981 – An agreement is signed in Lausanne by Juan Antonio Samaranch, the president of the IOC, and Shen Chia-ming, the president of the Chinese Taipei Olympic Committee (CTOC). The agreement specifies the name, flag and emblem of the CTOC.
- 1984 – Chinese Taipei competes for the first time under the new moniker at the Sarajevo Winter Games.

== Medal tables ==
=== Medals by Summer Games ===
Games	Athletes	Gold	Silver	Bronze	Total	Rank
1924 Paris	as part of Japan					
1932 Los Angeles	as part of Japan					
1936 Berlin	as part of Japan					
1948 London	as part of the Republic of China					
1952 Helsinki	did not participate					
1956 Melbourne	13	0	0	0	0	–
1960 Rome	27	0	1	0	1	32
1964 Tokyo	40	0	0	0	0	–
1968 Mexico City	43	0	0	1	1	42
1972 Munich	21	0	0	0	0	–
1976 Montreal	boycotted					
1980 Moscow	boycotted					
1984 Los Angeles	38	0	0	1	1	43
1988 Seoul	61	0	0	0	0	–
1992 Barcelona	37	0	1	0	1	49
1996 Atlanta	74	0	1	0	1	61
2000 Sydney	74	0	1	4	5	58
2004 Athens	89	2	2	1	5	31
2008 Beijing	80	1	1	2	4	45
2012 London	44	1	0	1	2	49
2016 Rio de Janeiro	58	1	0	2	3	50
2020 Tokyo	68	2	4	6	12	34
2024 Paris	60	2	0	5	7	35
2028 Los Angeles	future event					
2032 Brisbane	future event					
Total		9	11	23	43	63

=== Medals by Winter Games ===
Games	Athletes	Gold	Silver	Bronze	Total	Rank
1972 Sapporo	5	0	0	0	0	–
1976 Innsbruck	6	0	0	0	0	–
1980 Lake Placid	did not participate					
1984 Sarajevo	12	0	0	0	0	–
1988 Calgary	13	0	0	0	0	–
1992 Albertville	8	0	0	0	0	–
1994 Lillehammer	2	0	0	0	0	–
1998 Nagano	7	0	0	0	0	–
2002 Salt Lake City	6	0	0	0	0	–
2006 Turin	1	0	0	0	0	–
2010 Vancouver	1	0	0	0	0	–
2014 Sochi	3	0	0	0	0	–
2018 Pyeongchang	4	0	0	0	0	–
2022 Beijing	4	0	0	0	0	–
2026 Milano Cortina	8	0	0	0	0	–
2030 French Alps	future event					
2034 Utah	future event					
Total		0	0	0	0	–

=== Medals by summer sport ===
Sport	Gold	Silver	Bronze	Total
Weightlifting	4	2	5	11
Taekwondo	2	1	6	9
Badminton	2	1	0	3
Boxing	1	0	3	4
Archery	0	2	2	4
Table tennis	0	1	2	3
Athletics	0	1	1	2
Gymnastics	0	1	1	2
Baseball	0	1	0	1
Judo	0	1	0	1
Golf	0	0	1	1
Karate	0	0	1	1
Shooting	0	0	1	1
Totals (13 entries)	9	11	23	43

== List of medalists ==
Medal	Players/Players in the team	Games	Sport	Event
Silver	Yang Chuan-kwang	1960 Rome	Athletics	Men's decathlon
Bronze	Chi Cheng	1968 Mexico City	Athletics	Women's 80 metre hurdles
Bronze	Tsai Wen-yee	1984 Los Angeles	Weightlifting	Men's 60 kg
Silver	Chang Cheng-hsien; Chang Wen-chung; Chang Yaw-teing; Chen Chi-hsin; Chen Wei-chen; Chiang Tai-chuan; Huang Chung-yi; Huang Wen-po; Jong Yeu-jeng; Ku Kuo-chian; Kuo Lee Chien-fu; Liao Ming-hsiung; Lin Chao-huang; Lin Kun-han; Lo Chen-jung; Lo Kuo-chong; Pai Kun-hong; Tsai Ming-hung; Wang Kuang-shih; Wu Shih-hsih	1992 Barcelona	Baseball	Men's competition
Silver	Chen Jing	1996 Atlanta	Table tennis	Women's singles
Silver	Li Feng-ying	2000 Sydney	Weightlifting	Women's 53 kg
Bronze	Chen Jing	2000 Sydney	Table tennis	Women's singles
Bronze	Chi Shu-ju	2000 Sydney	Taekwondo	Women's 49 kg
Bronze	Huang Chih-hsiung	2000 Sydney	Taekwondo	Men's 58 kg
Bronze	Kuo Yi-hang	2000 Sydney	Weightlifting	Women's 75 kg
Gold	Chen Shih-hsin	2004 Athens	Taekwondo	Women's flyweight
Gold	Chu Mu-yen	2004 Athens	Taekwondo	Men's flyweight
Silver	Chen Szu-yuan; Liu Ming-huang; Wang Cheng-pang	2004 Athens	Archery	Men's team
Silver	Huang Chih-hsiung	2004 Athens	Taekwondo	Men's lightweight
Bronze	Chen Li-ju; Wu Hui-ju; Yuan Shu-chi	2004 Athens	Archery	Women's team
Gold	Chen Wei-ling	2008 Beijing	Weightlifting	Women's 48 kg
Silver	Lu Ying-chi	2008 Beijing	Weightlifting	Women's 63 kg
Bronze	Chu Mu-yen	2008 Beijing	Taekwondo	Men's 58 kg
Bronze	Sung Yu-chi	2008 Beijing	Taekwondo	Men's 68 kg
Gold	Hsu Shu-ching	2012 London	Weightlifting	Women's 53 kg
Bronze	Tseng Li-cheng	2012 London	Taekwondo	Women's 57 kg
Gold	Hsu Shu-ching	2016 Rio de Janeiro	Weightlifting	Women's 53 kg
Bronze	Lei Chien-ying; Lin Shih-chia; Tan Ya-ting	2016 Rio de Janeiro	Archery	Women's team
Bronze	Kuo Hsing-chun	2016 Rio de Janeiro	Weightlifting	Women's 58 kg
Gold	Kuo Hsing-chun	2020 Tokyo	Weightlifting	Women's 59 kg
Gold	Lee Yang; Wang Chi-lin	2020 Tokyo	Badminton	Men's doubles
Silver	Yang Yung-wei	2020 Tokyo	Judo	Men's 60 kg
Silver	Deng Yu-cheng; Tang Chih-chun; Wei Chun-heng	2020 Tokyo	Archery	Men's team
Silver	Lee Chih-kai	2020 Tokyo	Gymnastics	Men's pommel horse
Silver	Tai Tzu-ying	2020 Tokyo	Badminton	Women's singles
Bronze	Lo Chia-ling	2020 Tokyo	Taekwondo	Women's 57 kg
Bronze	Lin Yun-ju; Cheng I-ching	2020 Tokyo	Table tennis	Mixed doubles
Bronze	Chen Wen-huei	2020 Tokyo	Weightlifting	Women's 64 kg
Bronze	Pan Cheng-tsung	2020 Tokyo	Golf	Men's individual
Bronze	Huang Hsiao-wen	2020 Tokyo	Boxing	Women's flyweight
Bronze	Wen Tzu-yun	2020 Tokyo	Karate	Women's 55 kg
Gold	Lee Yang; Wang Chi-lin	2024 Paris	Badminton	Men's doubles
Gold	Lin Yu-ting	2024 Paris	Boxing	Women's 57 kg
Bronze	Lee Meng-yuan	2024 Paris	Shooting	Men's skeet
Bronze	Wu Shih-yi	2024 Paris	Boxing	Women's 60 kg
Bronze	Tang Chia-hung	2024 Paris	Gymnastics	Men's horizontal bar
Bronze	Chen Nien-chin	2024 Paris	Boxing	Women's 66 kg
Bronze	Kuo Hsing-chun	2024 Paris	Weightlifting	Women's 59 kg

== See also ==
- List of flag bearers for Chinese Taipei at the Olympics
- Category:Olympic competitors for Taiwan
- Chinese Taipei Olympic Committee
- Chinese Taipei Olympic flag
- Chinese Taipei at the Asian Games
- Republic of China at the Olympics
- Chinese Taipei at the Paralympics
