= Lin Chi-liang =

Taiwanese alpine skier (born 1959)

Personal information
- Nationality: Taiwanese
- Born: 27 September 1959 (age 67)

Sport
- Sport: Alpine skiing

Lin Chi-liang (born 27 September 1959) is a Taiwanese alpine skier. He competed at the 1984 Winter Olympics and the 1988 Winter Olympics.
