= Lien Te-an =

Taiwanese luger (born 1994)

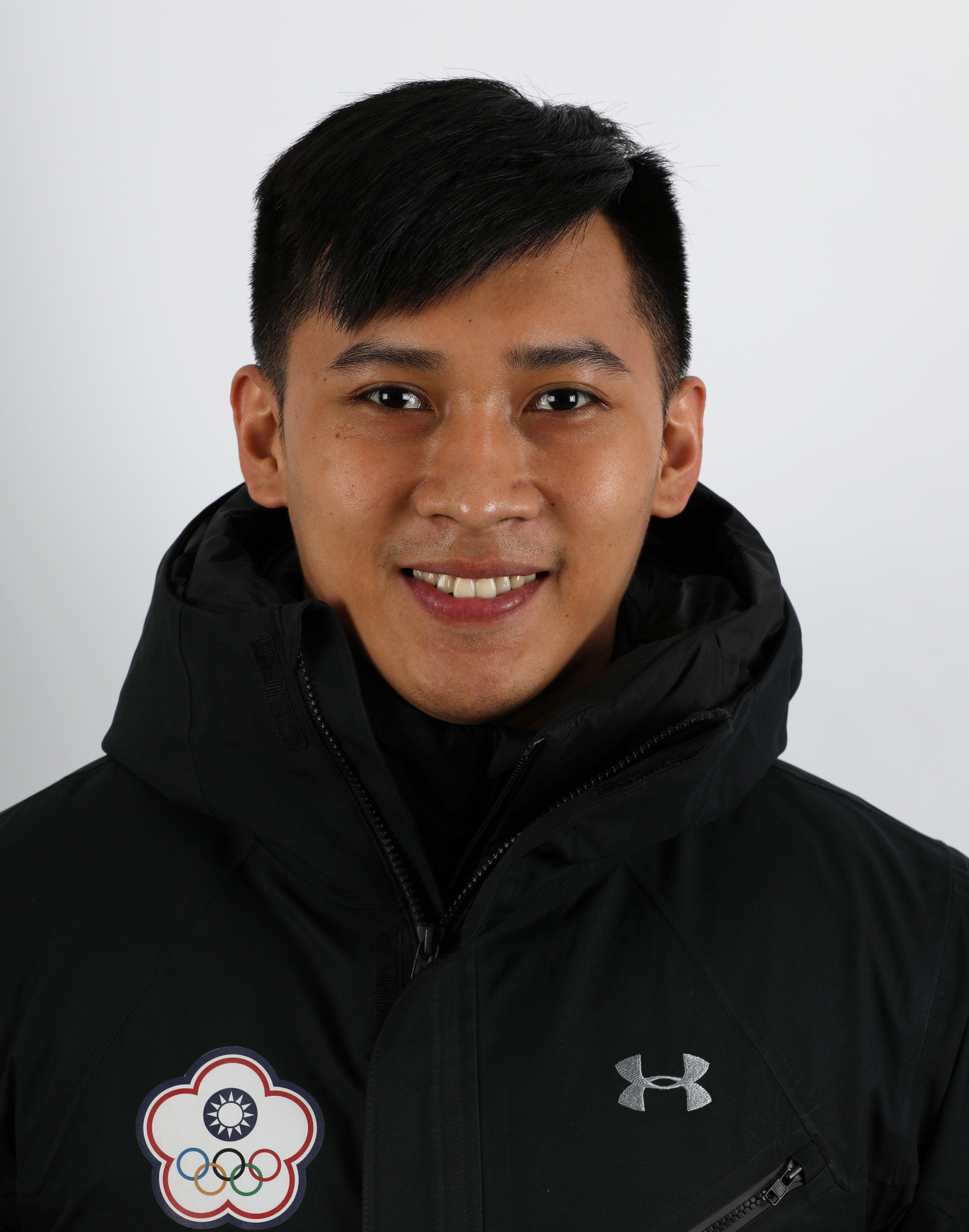
- Lien in 2018

Personal information
- Born: October 29, 1994 (age 31) Taiwan
Medal record
Luge
Asian Championships
Bronze medal – third place	2016 Nagano	Singles
Silver medal – second place	2017 Altenberg	Singles

Lien Te-an
- Traditional Chinese: 連德安
- Simplified Chinese: 连德安
Transcriptions
Standard Mandarin
- Hanyu Pinyin: Lián Dé'ān
- IPA: [ljɛ̌n tɤ̌ án]

Lien Te-an (Chinese: 連德安; pinyin: Lián Dé'ān; Mandarin pronunciation: [ljɛ̌n tɤ̌ án]; born October 29, 1994 in Taiwan) is a Taiwanese luger who has competed since 2012. He competed in the first ever Youth Olympics in Innsbruck, Austria, where he finished 20th out of 25th. Te-An also competed for Chinese Taipei at the 2014 Winter Olympics in Sochi, Russia, where he placed 39th in the men's single competition.

== Career ==
=== 2018 Winter Olympics ===
Te-an qualified to compete for Chinese Taipei at the 2018 Winter Olympics, marking the second straight Olympics he will compete in luge for the country.
