= Chen Chin-sen =

Taiwanese bobsledder

Personal information
- Nationality: Taiwanese
- Born: 30 October 1964 (age 60)

Sport
- Sport: Bobsleigh

Chen Chin-sen (born 30 October 1964) is a Taiwanese bobsledder. He competed at the 1988 Winter Olympics and the 1992 Winter Olympics.
