= Chang Min-jung =

Taiwanese bobsledder (born 1972)

Personal information
- Nationality: Taiwanese
- Born: 1 February 1972 (age 53)

Sport
- Sport: Bobsleigh

Chang Min-jung (born 1 February 1972) is a Taiwanese bobsledder. He competed at the 1992 Winter Olympics and the 1994 Winter Olympics.
