= Ma Chih-hung =

Taiwanese luger (born 1985)

Ma Chih-hung (Chinese: 馬志鴻; pinyin: Mǎ Zhìhóng; sometimes listed as Chih-Hung Ma; born November 5, 1985, in Pingtung County, Taiwan) is an aboriginal Taiwanese luger who has competed since 2003.

The youngest competitor in men's luge at the 2006 Winter Olympics at Turin at the age of 20, he finished 28th in the men's singles event and qualified for the 2010 Winter Olympics at Vancouver where he finished 34th. He is also noted for being the only competitor to represent Taiwan in these two Winter events.
