= Sun Kuang-ming =

Taiwanese bobsledder (born 1961)

Personal information
- Nationality: Taiwanese
- Born: 5 January 1961 (age 64); Hsinchu, Taiwan

Sport
- Sport: Bobsleigh

Sun Kuang-ming (Chinese: 孫光明; born 5 January 1961) is a Taiwanese bobsledder. He competed at the 1984, 1988, 1994 and the 1998 Winter Olympics. He also competed in the luge at the 1984 and 1988 Winter Olympics.
