= Republic of China at the Olympics =

- Flag of the Republic of China
- IOC code: ROC (CHN used at these Games)
- NOC: China National Amateur Athletic Federation (1922–1949)
- Medals: Gold 0 Silver 0 Bronze 0 Total 0

Summer appearances
- 1924; 1928; 1932; 1936; 1948

Other related appearances
- China (1952–pres.); Chinese Taipei (1956–pres.)

The Republic of China (ROC) took part in the opening ceremony of the 1924 Summer Olympics, but its four athletes, all of whom were tennis players, withdrew from competition. The ROC participated in its first Olympic Games in 1932 under the name of China. After the World War II, the ROC competed at the 1948 Summer Olympics. The ROC delegation at the 1948 Summer Games is the only ROC delegation composed of athletes from both mainland China and island of Taiwan in Olympic history. In 1932 and 1936, athletes from the island of Taiwan competed as part of the team of Japan.

After the Chinese Civil War, the ROC retreated to the island of Taiwan in 1949 and People's Republic of China (PRC) established in the mainland China. A number of IOC actions enabled the IOC to include both the PRC and the ROC in Olympic activities. The 1979 Nagoya Resolution recognised the PRC's Olympic Committee as the Chinese Olympic Committee and allowed the ROC to compete under the deliberately-ambiguous name "Chinese Taipei". The PRC welcomed the Nagoya Resolution and returned to the Games in 1980 while the ROC protested against this decision and boycotted the 1980 Games. The dispute was settled in 1981 as an agreement was signed between the IOC and the ROC's Chinese Taipei Olympic Committee. Based on the 1981 agreement, the ROC has competed under the name of Chinese Taipei since the 1984 Winter Olympics.

== Timeline of participation ==
Olympic Year/s	Teams				
Olympic Year/s	Mainland China			Taiwan	
1924	China		(Chine)	as part of Japan (Note: except Kinmen and Matsu Islands, which have been controlled by China during all Olympics; Taiwan was reclaimed by China in 1945 following her victory against Japan.)	
1932–1936	Republic of China	China	(CHN)	as part of Japan	
1948	Republic of China		(CHN)		
1952	People's Republic of China	People's Republic of China (PRC)			
1956				Republic of China	Formosa-China (CHN)
1960				Republic of China	Formosa (RCF)
1964–1968				Republic of China	Taiwan (TWN)
1972–1976 W				Republic of China	Republic of China (ROC)
1980 W	People's Republic of China	People's Republic of China (CHN)			
1984–present	People's Republic of China	People's Republic of China (CHN)		Chinese Taipei for Olympic games	Chinese Taipei (TPE)

== Medal tables ==
=== Medals by Summer Games ===
Games	Athletes	Gold	Silver	Bronze	Total	Rank
1924 Paris	4	0	0	0	0	–
1928 Amsterdam	did not participate					
1932 Los Angeles	1	0	0	0	0	–
1936 Berlin	54	0	0	0	0	–
1948 London	31	0	0	0	0	–
Total		0	0	0	0	–

== Nagoya Resolution ==
After the Republic of China (ROC) was denied official representation in the 1976 Summer Olympics, the International Olympic Committee (IOC) passed a resolution to recognize both the PRC's and the ROC's National Olympic Committees (NOC) at the 81st IOC Session held in April 1979. The resolution specified "all matters pertaining to names, anthems, flags and constitutions will be the subject of studies and agreements which will have to be completed as soon as possible." The IOC Executive Board appointed a three-person working group consisting of First Vice President Mohammed Mzali as the head, and including Alexandru Siperco and Lance Cross. In June 1979, Siperco drew up a draft resolution to recognize the PRC's NOC as the Chinese Olympic Committee and to recognize the ROC's NOC as the Chinese Taipei Olympic Committee on the condition that the ROC's NOC adopted an anthem and a flag which were different from those of the ROC used then. The Executive Board decided to wait until the October meeting in Nagoya to confirm the draft.

At the Nagoya meeting, the Executive Board passed a resolution known as the Nagoya Resolution. The resolution read as follows:

Emblem of the PRC approved in 1979

Emblem of the ROC banned in 1979

The Resolution of the Executive Board is:
The People's Republic of China:
Name: Chinese Olympic Committee
NOC anthem, flag and emblem: Flag and anthem of the People's Republic of China. The emblem submitted to and approved by the Executive Board.
Constitution: In order.

Committee based in Taipei:
Name: Chinese Taipei Olympic Committee
NOC anthem, flag and emblem: Other than those used at present and which must be approved by the Executive Board of the I.O.C..
Constitution: To be amended in conformity with I.O.C. Rules by 1st January 1980

Lord Killanin, the president of the IOC, submitted the resolution to 89 IOC members for a postal vote on 26 October 1979. 81 ballots were received at IOC headquarters. The results of the votes were released on 26 November and the resolution was passed by a vote of 62 to 17, with two abstentions.

The Nagoya Resolution allowed the PRC and the ROC to participate together by designating that the ROC would be identified as "Chinese Taipei" and any identifying flag, anthem, or emblem used in Olympic activities would be without symbolism to show the existence of the ROC and demonstrate its sovereign nation status. The resolution was accomplished under a version of the Olympic Charter that stated that the words "country" or "nation" in the charter could also apply to a "geographical area, district or territory." The PRC could symbolize Taiwan as a dependent territory of the PRC, and the Olympic committee on Taiwan as a territorial branch of the Chinese Olympic Committee.

=== 1981 agreement ===
Emblem of the Chinese Taipei Olympic Committee

The ROC's NOC and IOC member Henry Hsu refused to recognize the Nagoya Resolution, and filed a series of lawsuits against the IOC for annulment of the resolution in 1979. The dispute was not settled until the IOC and the ROC's NOC signed an agreement in 1981. Based on the agreement, the ROC's NOC is recognized as the Chinese Taipei Olympic Committee and entitled to be treated on the equal footing as other NOCs.

The 1997 revision of the IOC Charter was clarified to define the term "country" as an independent state with international recognition. A retroactive action to remove recognition of an existing NOC was prohibited by a 1996 IOC Session action. Therefore, the Chinese Taipei Olympic Committee preserved its existing status in the IOC. Hong Kong and Macao, two special administrative regions of China, have their own Olympic Committees with different status. The Olympic Committee of Hong Kong was recognized by the IOC since 1951, whereas the Olympic Committee of Macau failed to be a new member of the IOC given the fact that Macao is not a state.

=== Translation of Chinese Taipei ===
The Nagoya Resolution was officially written in English and French, creating a deliberately ambiguous term "Chinese" that could be interpreted as the sovereign state (e.g. as in "Chinese embassy") or as the culture (e.g. as in "Chinese architecture"). The ROC translated Chinese Taipei as Chunghwa Taipei (simplified Chinese: 中华台北; traditional Chinese: 中華臺北; pinyin: Zhōnghuá Táiběi), however, the PRC translate it as Zhōngguó Táiběi (simplified Chinese: 中国台北; traditional Chinese: 中國臺北). There was no problem when the ROC and the PRC were involved in the same event in other countries, as the name would be spelled according to the host language. However, the 1990 Asian Games in Beijing resurrected the issue. According to He Zhenliang, the IOC member from the PRC, the ROC refused the "Zhongguo" name interpretation on principle due to the direct implication that the team would be a local part of China. Eventually, the PRC agreed that the ROC name did not imply that there were two Chinas or one China, one Taiwan. In 1989, the two Olympic committees signed a pact in Hong Kong where the PRC agreed to use the ROC's translation in international sports-related occasions hosted in China.
