= Chinese Taipei Olympic flag =

Flag used in sporting events

Chinese Taipei
- 梅花旗 (Méihuāqí), literally "Plum Blossom Banner"
- Proportion: 2:3
- Adopted: 1981; 45 years ago
- Design: The national emblem above the Olympic Five Rings, surrounded by five-petal plum blossoms (the national flower) in red, white, and blue
- Designed by: Ueng Ming-yih

Flag of the Republic of China

The Chinese Taipei Olympic flag which is the Flag of the Chinese Taipei Olympic Committee, is used by the Republic of China (ROC) Taiwan team, which competes under the title "Chinese Taipei" during the Olympic Games and other events, in place of the flag of the Republic of China. This is a result of the complex cross-strait relations between the Republic of China and the People's Republic of China. The Olympic flag has been in use since 1981, following the decision by the International Olympic Committee that the ROC could not compete under the country's name or flag.

Due to this restriction, the National Anthem of the Republic of China also could not be played when the team wins medals, so, instead, the National Flag Anthem of the Republic of China was played during the flag raising of the medal ceremony.

In addition to its use in the Olympics, some companies operating in mainland China use the Chinese Taipei flag in place of the ROC flag to represent Taiwan since it is illegal to use the flag of the ROC to refer to Taiwan in mainland China. The flag of Chinese Taipei Olympic Committee used to represent Taiwan in most international sporting events outside the Olympics.

== Design ==
The flag shows the Blue Sky with a White Sun (the emblem of the Republic of China and the Kuomintang) and the Olympic rings, encircled by a five-petaled Prunus mume (the ROC's national flower) drawn in red, white, and blue (the colors of the ROC flag). The flag was designed by Ueng Ming-yih, a skier who was also a part of international relations group of the Chinese Taipei Olympic Committee at the time. Ueng, who was tasked by Olympic Committee President Shen Chia-ming with designing the flag, initially created five designs before selecting three for President Chiang Ching-kuo to choose from.

== Court case over IOC decision ==
The IOC adopted the Nagoya Resolution in November 1979 which called for the "Republic of China Olympic Committee" to change its name to the "Chinese Taipei Olympic Committee" and adopt a new flag and anthem if it wanted to participate in the Olympic Games. The ROC strongly disagreed with the decision and sued the IOC in Switzerland. The ROC claimed that the conditions concerning its name, flag, and anthem violated articles 6, 64, and 66 of the Olympic Charter. However, despite appealing an initial court judgment, the ROC was not successful. On 15 January 1980, a Swiss court rejected the ROC effort to remain in the Olympic movement under the name of "Republic of China."

After a series of forceful objections, Taiwan officially accepted the compromise in 1981, and the island competed in the 1984 Winter Olympics in Sarajevo, SFR Yugoslavia.

== Other flags ==
For most other Olympic-affiliated and international sporting events, Taiwan uses the Olympic flag, but there are exceptions:

- The Paralympic flag replaces the Olympic rings with the logo of the International Paralympic Committee.
- Starting at the 2019 Winter Deaflympics, there was a new flag with the Deaflympics logo. A prior version instead featured a green Chinese dragon and the name "Chinese Taipei" on lower part from the symbol.
- Prior to 2006, the flag of the Chinese Taipei national football team had the taijitu (the yin and yang symbol), with the black and white dots replaced with footballs and a yellow background. After 2006, it has used the standard flag with Olympic rings.
- The Universiade flag replaces the Olympic rings with the letter U (from the logo of the FISU) and has an electric blue background.
- The flag of the Chinese Taipei Volleyball Association replaces the Olympic rings with a volleyball-playing figure and the abbreviation of the association. Furthermore, this flag is for association use only, not for games.

== Gallery ==
=== Current flags ===
Flag of Chinese Taipei Olympic Committee

Flag of Chinese Taipei Paralympic Committee

Flag of Chinese Taipei Deaf Sports Federation

Flag of Chinese Taipei University Sports Federation

Flag of Chinese Taipei Volleyball Association (only for the association)

Flag of Chinese Taipei used in the WorldSkills

=== Former flags and emblems ===
Emblem of Republic of China Olympic Committee (1960–1979)

Flag of Chinese Taipei used in the Paralympic Games (1994–2004)

Flag of Chinese Taipei used in the Paralympic Games (2004–2019)

Flag of Chinese Taipei used in the Deaflympics (1991–2018)

Chinese Taipei football flag (pre-2006)

=== Other flags ===
Flag for the Overwatch team of Chinese Taipei in the Overwatch World Cup

== See also ==
- Chinese Taipei at the Olympics
- Chinese Taipei Olympic Committee
