= Chinese Taipei Olympic Committee =

National Olympic Committee

- Country: Republic of China (Taiwan)
- Code: TPE
- Created: 1910 (as the CNOC); 3 April 1922 (as COC)
- Recognized: 1922 (as China); 1 January 1960 (as Republic of China); 23 March 1981 (as Chinese Taipei)
- Continental Association: OCA
- Headquarters: No 20 Chu Lun Street, Zhongshan District, Taipei City, Taiwan (Republic of China)
- President: Lin Hong-dow
- Secretary General: Lisa HSIAO-TZU HS
- Website: tpenoc.net

The Chinese Taipei Olympic Committee (CTOC; Chinese: 中華奧林匹克委員會; IOC code TPE) is the National Olympic Committee representing the Republic of China.

== History ==
This Olympic committee had its origins as "Chinese National Olympic Committee" (中國奧林匹克委員會) which was created in the late Qing dynasty to represent China's interests in Olympic Games activities. The China National Amateur Athletic Federation (中華業餘運動聯合會) was established on 3 April 1922. Later that year, the International Olympic Committee recognized the federation as the Chinese Olympic Committee (中國奧林匹克委員會). As Taiwan was part of colonial Japan, Taiwanese athletes were represented by the Japanese Olympic Committee.

The China National Amateur Athletic Federation was reorganized on 24 August 1924 in Shanghai; the name of the federation remained the same in English but not in Chinese. The federation attended the opening ceremony of the 1924 Summer Olympics in Paris, but did not attend the events; no athletes were sent to attend the 1928 Summer Olympics in Amsterdam. During the 1932 Summer Olympics, held in Los Angeles, the federation used the name "China" and only one athlete, Liu Changchun, competed in sprinting.

In the aftermath of the Chinese Civil War, nineteen of the twenty-six members of the federation left the mainland for Taiwan. The headquarters of the federation moved from Nanking to Taipei City and, with the approval of the IOC, the federation was renamed the Chinese Olympic Committee, National Amateur Athletic Federation. The first Olympic medalist in the country's history was Taiwanese athlete Yang Chuan-kwang during the 1960 Summer Olympics.

The Original Emblem of the Republic of China Olympic Committee used between 1960 and 1979

The Organizing Committee for the 1952 Summer Olympics scheduled for Helsinki invited both the People's Republic of China and Republic of China attend the Games, as the IOC recognized both Olympic Committees, but the Chinese Olympic Committee withdrew from the games because its delegation was listed as "China (Formosa)". The federation was informed by the International Committee that, as it did not control sport in Mainland China, it could not continue to be recognized as "Chinese National Olympic Committee," and only applications under a different name would be considered. Moreover, the announcement stated: "IOC should not be involved in any political issue or views." The Executive Committee of the International Olympic Committee stated the National Olympic Committee should be considered its own local jurisdiction, but have jurisdiction over its governance. Therefore, the federation reorganized itself as the Republic of China Olympic Committee (ROCOC, 中華民國奧林匹克委員會) on 1 January 1960, and this name was approved in the 1960s.

The ROC NOC agreed the delegation should be known as "Taiwan", but would be allowed to use the initials "ROC" their uniforms. Shortly after Taiwan's expulsion from the UN in 1971, the People's Republic of China implemented the "One China" policy, making it difficult for the island to be recognized in many fields, not just sports. For example, in 1976 the Canadian government announced it was not permitting members of ROCOC to attend the 1976 Summer Olympics as it recognized People's Republic of China as the sole legitimate government according to the One China Policy.

The federation held an annual Chinese Taipei Olympic Academy (CTOA, 中華奧林匹克學院) as the National Olympic Academy Session (NOA, 奧林匹克研討會) each year in different counties of Taiwan since 1978, and the academy became the fourth National Olympic Committee, and was the first NOC in Asia to hold an Olympic Academy.

The United States Olympic Committee tried to solve the problem of the membership between ROC's NOC and PRC's NOC during the 81st IOC Session in Montevideo, Uruguay, as relations between Republic of China and the United States of America broke off in 1979. The ROCOC was forced to change the name of the committee and would no longer be allowed to use the national anthem and national flag of the Republic of China according to the results of a postal ballot (62:17) by the Executive Committee of the International Olympic Committee in Nagoya, Japan. Later on, the Swiss Court agreed the judicial review of the ROCOC and the Taiwanese IOC member Henry Hsu by the IOC violated the Olympic Charter. As a result, the IOC modified the Olympic Charter in 1980 which stated that Olympic delegations are recognized National Olympic Committees by the IOC and IOC members cannot sue the IOC following the judgement by the Swiss Court.

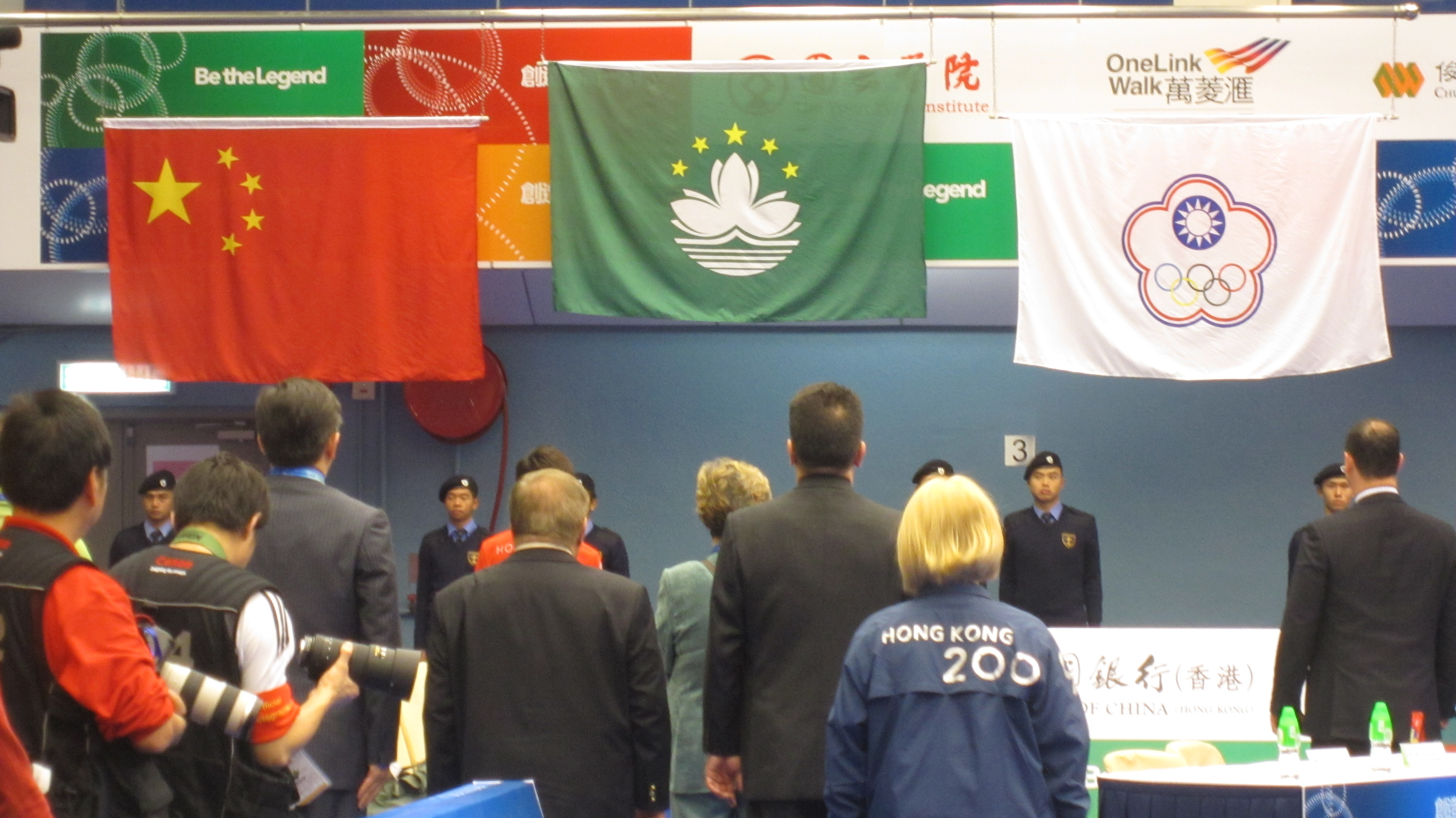
Flag of Chinese Taipei Olympic Committee (right) is raised in a Victory Ceremony during the 2009 East Asian Games in Hong Kong.

ROCOC was renamed as the "Chinese Taipei Olympic Committee" (CTOC, 中華奧林匹克委員會) as mentioned in the "Agreement between the International Olympic Committee, Lausanne, and the Chinese Taipei Olympic Committee, Taipei" signed by Shen Jia-ming (delegate of the committee) who presented it to the International Olympic Committee in Lausanne, Switzerland, on 23 March 1981, with the assistance of Juan Antonio Samaranch, the IOC president. The approved agreement allowed the delegation of the Chinese Taipei Olympic Committee to use Chinese Taipei for presenting themselves, and the emblem and the flag of the Chinese Taipei Olympic Committee as the delegation's symbol. Moreover, the Chinese Taipei team would use the letter "T" to determine alphabetical order in the IOC Directory. The committee competed for the first time under the new moniker at the Sarajevo Games.

It was only in 1989 that both the Olympic Committee of the People's Republic of China (COC) and the Olympic Committee of Chinese Taipei (CTOC) began to collaborate and exchange internationally. For this to happen, a second agreement was signed on 6 April of that year. Within the stipulated conditions was the requirement that any delegation or international organization from the ROC had to use "Chinese Taipei" (中華台北) rather than "China Taipei" (中國台北) to participate. This agreement paved the way for ROC participation in the 1990 Asian Games scheduled for Beijing.

The Chinese Taipei Olympic committee has been using the 'Plum Blossom Banner' in the Olympic Games since the signing of an agreement with the IOC in 1981.

== Symbols ==
The emblem of the Chinese Taipei Olympic Committee includes symbols of the Chinese Taipei Olympic Committee and the Chinese Taipei team. The periphery shape is plum blossom that symbolizes the National Flower of the Republic of China. It includes the Olympic rings and the Blue Sky with a White Sun (note that the Blue Sky with a White Sun is different from both the National Emblem of the Republic of China and the party emblem of the Kuomintang although it seems the same as the National Emblem of the Republic of China). For the Flag of the Chinese Taipei Olympic Committee is the same as the emblem.

After the Agreement signed in 1981 which was approved by the International Olympic Committee in June 1981, the tune of the National Flag Anthem of the Republic of China is used as the tune of the anthem of Chinese Taipei and also the Anthem of the Chinese Taipei Olympic Committee (中華奧林匹克委員會會歌) along with modified lyrics based on the theory of Olympism, and it is not the National Anthem of the Republic of China.

== List of presidents ==
The following table lists all the presidents of the Olympic committee:

	Name	Duration	Remarks
1	Wang Zhengting	1922–1954	
2	Hao Geng-sheng	1954–1956	Co-founder of Asian Games
3	Chou Chih-jou	Jun 1956 – Dec 1957	
4	Jack C. K. Teng	Dec 1957 – Sept 1962	
5	Yang Sen	Feb 24, 1962 – Jun 1973	
6	Henry Hsu	17 July 1973 – May 1974	
7	Shen Chia-ming	May 1974 – Sep 1982	Died due to heart disease
8	Cheng Wei-yuan	Dec 1982 – Sep 1987	
9	Chang Feng-hsu	Sep 1987 – Jan 19, 1998	served concurrently as Chairman of China National Amateur Athletic Federation until 1994
10	Huang Ta-chou	Jan 19, 1998 – Jan 2006	
11	Thomas Tsai	Jan 2006 – Dec 2013	
12	Lin Hong-dow	Dec 2013 – Dec 2025	The current president
12	Tsai Chia-fu	Jan 2026 –	The president-elect

== See also ==
- Chinese Olympic Committee
- Chinese Taipei
- Chinese Taipei at the Olympics
- Chinese Taipei Olympic flag
