= Baseball at the 1992 Summer Olympics – Team squads =

Baseball event in the 1992 Summer Olympics

The following is the list of squads that took place in the baseball tournament at the 1992 Summer Olympics.

== Chinese Taipei ==
- Chang Cheng-hsien
- Chang Wen-chung
- Chang Yaw-teing
- Chen Chi-hsin
- Chen Wei-chen
- Chiang Tai-chuan
- Huang Chung-yi
- Huang Wen-po
- Jong Yeu-jeng
- Ku Kuo-chian
- Kuo Lee Chien-Fu
- Liao Ming-hsiung
- Lin Chao-huang
- Lin Kun-han
- Lo Chen-jung
- Lo Kuo-chung
- Pai Kun-hong
- Tsai Ming-hung
- Wang Kuang-shih
- Wu Shih-hsin

== Cuba ==
The following was Cuba's roster in the baseball tournament of the 1992 Summer Olympics.

Manager: Jorge Fuentes

Coaches: Luis Enrique González, Jorge Hernández

Pos.	No.	Player	Date of birth (age)	Bats	Throws	Club
P	31	Omar Ajete	31 July 1965 (aged 26)	L	L	Vegueros
P	44	Rolando Arrojo	18 July 1965 (aged 27)	R	R	Villa Clara
P	28	Giorge Díaz	16 September 1970 (aged 21)	R	R	Guantánamo
P	25	Osvaldo Fernández	4 November 1966 (aged 25)	R	R	Holguín
P	26	Orlando Hernández	11 October 1965 (aged 26)	R	R	Industriales
P	51	Juan Carlos Pérez	17 May 1969 (aged 23)	R	R	Las Tunas
P	38	Jorge Luis Valdés	12 February 1961 (aged 31)	L	L	Henequeneros
C	41	José Raúl Delgado	25 August 1960 (aged 31)	R	R	Sancti Spíritus
C	2	Alberto Hernández	6 February 1969 (aged 23)	R	R	Holguín
IF	20	Lourdes Gourriel	9 March 1957 (aged 35)	R	R	Sancti Spíritus
IF	10	Omar Linares	23 November 1967 (aged 24)	R	R	Vegueros
IF	11	Germán Mesa	12 May 1967 (aged 25)	R	R	Industriales
IF	47	Antonio Pacheco	4 June 1964 (aged 28)	R	R	Santiago de Cuba
IF	12	Juan Padilla	16 September 1965 (aged 26)	R	R	Industriales
IF	1	Luis Ulacia	24 September 1963 (aged 28)	L	R	Camagüey
IF	7	Lázaro Vargas	18 January 1964 (aged 28)	R	R	Industriales
OF	24	José Estrada	22 January 1967 (aged 25)	R	R	Henequeneros
OF	46	Orestes Kindelán	1 November 1964 (aged 27)	R	R	Santiago de Cuba
OF	32	Víctor Mesa	20 February 1960 (aged 32)	R	R	Villa Clara
OF	55	Ermidelio Urrutia	25 August 1963 (aged 28)	R	R	Las Tunas

== Dominican Republic ==
- Félix Nova
- José Ramón Veras
- Manuel Guzmán
- Fabio Aquino
- Roberto Casey
- Eugenio Valdez
- Rafaelito Mercedes
- Félix Tejada
- Teófilo Peña
- Alexis Peña
- Fausto Peña
- Teodoro Novas
- Cipriano Ventura
- Juan Sánchez
- Juan Viñas
- Roque Solano
- Silvestre Popoteur
- Elías Olivos
- Benjamín Heredia
- José Santana

== Italy ==
The following was Italy's roster in the baseball tournament of the 1992 Summer Olympics.

Manager: Silvano Ambrosini

Coaches: Giampiero Faraone, Salvatore Varriale, José Manuel Cortina

Pos.	No.	Player	Date of birth (age)	Bats	Throws	Club
P	19	Paolo Ceccaroli	21 May 1962 (aged 30)	R	R	Parma Baseball Club
P	22	Rolando Cretis	11 February 1963 (aged 29)	R	R	Fortitudo Baseball Bologna
P	12	Maurizio De Sanctis	5 February 1962 (aged 30)	L	L	Rimini Baseball Club
P	16	Massimiliano Masin	9 July 1968 (aged 24)	L	L	Nettuno Baseball Club
P	55	Massimo Melasi	15 May 1961 (aged 31)	L	R	Novara Baseball
P	18	Claudio Taglienti	9 January 1965 (aged 27)	L	L	Nettuno Baseball Club
P	15	Fulvio Valle	20 April 1966 (aged 26)	R	R	Parma Baseball Club
C	9	Elio Gambuti	11 September 1961 (aged 30)	R	R	Rimini Baseball Club
C	13	Francesco Petruzzelli	24 October 1962 (aged 29)	R	R	Grosseto Baseball Club
IF	20	Ruggero Bagialemani	2 February 1963 (aged 29)	R	R	Nettuno Baseball Club
IF	32	Roberto Bianchi	2 March 1963 (aged 29)	R	R	Milano Baseball Club
IF	6	Claudio Cecconi	22 March 1965 (aged 27)	R	R	Nettuno Baseball Club
IF	14	Massimo Ciaramella	1 October 1970 (aged 21)	R	R	Nettuno Baseball Club
IF	23	Alberto D'Auria	10 March 1967 (aged 25)	R	R	Nettuno Baseball Club
IF	44	Massimo Fochi	11 December 1964 (aged 27)	R	R	Parma Baseball Club
IF	5	Guglielmo Trinci	25 August 1959 (aged 32)	R	L	Nettuno Baseball Club
OF	40	Luigi Carrozza	17 June 1969 (aged 23)	R	R	Parma Baseball Club
OF	39	Leonardo Schianchi	15 February 1960 (aged 32)	R	R	Rimini Baseball Club
OF	17	Andrea Succi	14 March 1961 (aged 31)	R	R	Rimini Baseball Club
OF	11	Marco Ubani	10 February 1965 (aged 27)	R	R	Nettuno Baseball Club

== Japan ==
The following was Japan's roster in the baseball tournament of the 1992 Summer Olympics.

Manager: Masatake Yamanaka

Coaches: Hiroo Nobata, Nobihusa Arai

Pos.	No.	Player	Date of birth (age)	Bats	Throws	Club
P	18	Tomohito Ito	30 October 1970 (aged 21)	R	R	Mitsubishi Motors Kyoto
P	17	Masahito Kohiyama	7 May 1969 (aged 23)	R	R	Nippon Oil
P	16	Kazutaka Nishiyama	28 August 1970 (aged 21)	R	R	NTT Shikoku
P	12	Yasuhiro Sato	25 July 1967 (aged 25)	R	R	Prince Hotel
P	19	Masanori Sugiura	23 May 1968 (aged 24)	R	R	Nippon Life Insurance
P	14	Kento Sugiyama	12 December 1968 (aged 23)	L	L	Toshiba
P	15	Katsumi Watanabe	16 May 1962 (aged 30)	R	L	Daishowa Paper Hokkaido
C	23	Takashi Miwa	1 December 1969 (aged 22)	R	R	Kobe Steel
C	10	Yasunori Takami	6 January 1964 (aged 28)	R	R	Toshiba
IF	7	Hirotami Kojima	3 March 1964 (aged 28)	R	R	Mitsubishi Heavy Industries Nagasaki
IF	8	Hiroki Kokubo	8 October 1971 (aged 20)	R	R	Aoyama Gakuin University
IF	4	Masafumi Nishi	25 November 1960 (aged 31)	L	L	Osaka Gas
IF	1	Koichi Oshima	17 June 1967 (aged 25)	L	R	Nippon Life Insurance
IF	6	Akihiro Togo	18 February 1967 (aged 25)	R	R	Nippon Life Insurance
IF	5	Koji Tokunaga	3 September 1968 (aged 23)	R	R	Nippon Oil
IF	3	Shigeki Wakabayashi	24 December 1966 (aged 25)	R	R	Nippon Oil
OF	28	Shinichiro Kawabata	5 December 1966 (aged 25)	R	R	Sumitomo Metal
OF	26	Hiroshi Nakamoto	22 August 1966 (aged 25)	L	L	Matsushita Electric
OF	9	Hiroyuki Sakaguchi	2 August 1965 (aged 26)	L	L	Nippon Oil
OF	25	Shinichi Sato	7 August 1965 (aged 26)	R	R	Hokkaido Takushoku Bank

== Puerto Rico ==
Manager: José Carradero

Coaches: José García Cruz, Otoniel Vélez

Player	No.	Pos.	Date of birth (age)	Team	League	Birthplace
Jorge Aranzamendi	4	OF	July 30, 1964 (aged 27)	(Puerto Rico) Santa Isabel	Liga de Béisbol Superior Doble A	(Puerto Rico)
Albert Bracero	3	OF	September 8, 1966 (aged 25)	(Puerto Rico) Humacao	Liga de Béisbol Superior Doble A	(Puerto Rico)
Silvio Censale	37	P	November 21, 1971 (aged 20)	(Puerto Rico)	Liga de Béisbol Superior Doble A	(United States) Jersey City, New Jersey
Jesús Feliciano	23	P	March 27, 1956 (aged 36)	(Puerto Rico)	Liga de Béisbol Superior Doble A	(Puerto Rico)
James Figueroa	20	P	May 5, 1956 (aged 36)	(Puerto Rico)	Liga de Béisbol Superior Doble A	(Puerto Rico)
Efraín García	27	IF	December 7, 1962 (aged 29)	(Puerto Rico)	Liga de Béisbol Superior Doble A	(Puerto Rico)
Orlando López	29	P	March 28, 1973 (aged 19)	(Puerto Rico) Aguadilla	Liga de Béisbol Superior Doble A	(Puerto Rico) Isabela
Roberto López	26	IF	November 15, 1971 (aged 20)	(Puerto Rico)	Liga de Béisbol Superior Doble A	(Puerto Rico) Bayamón
Gualberto López	12	DH	October 7, 1967 (aged 24)	(Puerto Rico) Cidra	Liga de Béisbol Superior Doble A	(Puerto Rico)
José Lorenzana	8	C	September 13, 1959 (aged 32)	(Puerto Rico)	Liga de Béisbol Superior Doble A	(Puerto Rico)
José Mateo	25	P	September 16, 1972 (aged 19)	(Puerto Rico)	Liga de Béisbol Superior Doble A	(Puerto Rico)
Angel Morales	18	OF	February 8, 1965 (aged 27)	(Puerto Rico)	Liga de Béisbol Superior Doble A	(Puerto Rico)
Efraín Nieves	11		October 23, 1967 (aged 24)	(Puerto Rico) Barranquitas	Liga de Béisbol Superior Doble A	(Puerto Rico)
Luis Ramos	13	IF	November 17, 1962 (aged 29)	(Puerto Rico)	Liga de Béisbol Superior Doble A	(Puerto Rico)
Helson Rodriguez	32		April 2, 1962 (aged 30)	(Puerto Rico)	Liga de Béisbol Superior Doble A	(Puerto Rico)
Abimael Rosario	2		February 18, 1966 (aged 26)	(Puerto Rico)	Liga de Béisbol Superior Doble A	(Puerto Rico)
Rafael Santiago	22	P	April 29, 1966 (aged 26)	(Puerto Rico)	Liga de Béisbol Superior Doble A	(Puerto Rico)
José Sepulveda	34	P	October 6, 1969 (aged 22)	(Puerto Rico) Juncos	Liga de Béisbol Superior Doble A	(Puerto Rico)
Manuel Serrano	17	IF	January 23, 1970 (aged 22)	(Puerto Rico)	Liga de Béisbol Superior Doble A	(Puerto Rico)
Wilfredo Vélez	15	P	April 5, 1966 (aged 26)	(Puerto Rico) Yabucoa	Liga de Béisbol Superior Doble A	(Puerto Rico)

== Spain ==
- Manuel Martínez
- Jesús Lisarri
- Juan Pedro Belza
- Antonio Salazar
- Enrique Cortés
- Miguel Ángel Pariente
- José Arza
- Javier Díez
- Juan Damborenea
- Francisco Aristu
- Luis León
- Félix Cano
- Juan Manuel Salmerón
- Xavier Camps
- José María Pulido
- Miguel Stella
- Gabriel Valarezo
- José Luis Becerra
- Xavier Civit
- Óscar Rebolleda

== United States ==
The following was United States' roster in the baseball tournament of the 1992 Summer Olympics.

Manager: Ron Fraser

Coaches: Brad Kelley, Dave Snow, Jerry Weinstein

Pos.	No.	Player	Date of birth (age)	Bats	Throws	Club
P	25	Willie Adams	8 October 1972 (aged 19)	R	R	Stanford Cardinal
P	35	Jeff Alkire	15 November 1969 (aged 22)	R	L	Miami Hurricanes
P	37	Darren Dreifort	3 May 1972 (aged 20)	R	R	Wichita State Shockers
P	32	Rick Greene	2 January 1971 (aged 21)	R	R	LSU Tigers
P	34	Rick Helling	15 December 1970 (aged 21)	R	R	Stanford Cardinal
P	36	Daron Kirkreit	8 August 1972 (aged 19)	R	R	UC Riverside Highlanders
P	31	Chris Roberts	25 June 1971 (aged 21)	R	L	Florida State Seminoles
P	29	Ron Villone	16 January 1970 (aged 22)	L	L	UMass Minutemen
P	20	B. J. Wallace	18 May 1971 (aged 21)	R	L	Mississippi State Bulldogs
C	42	Charles Johnson	20 July 1971 (aged 21)	R	R	Miami Hurricanes
C	30	Jason Varitek	11 April 1972 (aged 20)	S	R	Georgia Tech Yellow Jackets
IF	5	Nomar Garciaparra	23 July 1973 (aged 19)	R	R	Georgia Tech Yellow Jackets
IF	21	Jason Giambi	8 January 1971 (aged 21)	L	R	Long Beach State Dirtbags
IF	23	Phil Nevin	19 January 1971 (aged 21)	R	R	Cal State Fullerton Titans
IF	11	Craig Wilson	3 September 1970 (aged 21)	R	R	Kansas State Wildcats
IF	8	Chris Wimmer	25 September 1970 (aged 21)	R	R	Wichita State Shockers
OF	12	Jeffrey Hammonds	5 March 1971 (aged 21)	R	R	Stanford Cardinal
OF	38	Chad McConnell	13 October 1970 (aged 21)	R	R	Creighton Bluejays
OF	7	Calvin Murray	30 July 1971 (aged 20)	R	R	Texas Longhorns
OF	19	Michael Tucker	25 June 1971 (aged 21)	L	R	Longwood Lancers

Note: Jason Moler of Cal State Fullerton was initially named to the squad as one of the catchers, but was replaced by Varitek due to injury prior to the start of the competition.
