= List of Olympic medalists in baseball =

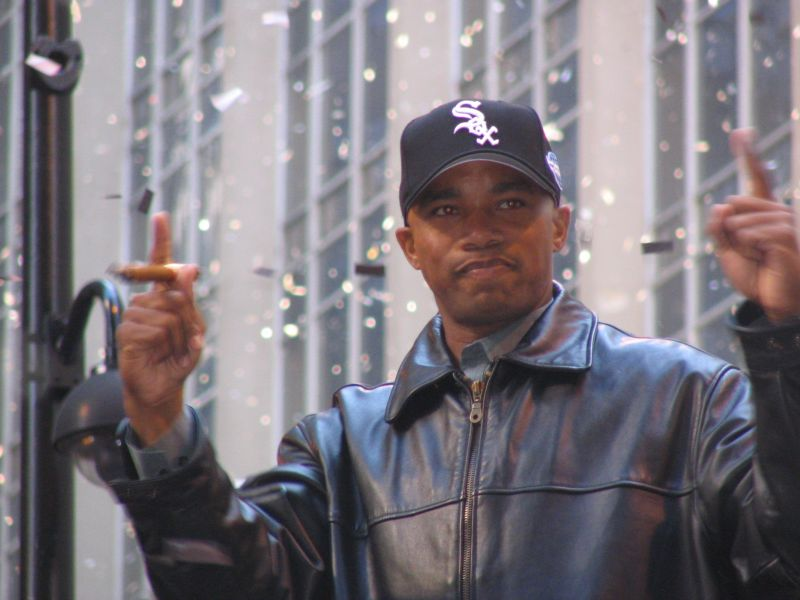
Orlando Hernández won gold with the Cuban team in the 1992 Summer Olympics, baseball's first appearance as an Olympic medal sport.

Baseball is a sport formerly contested at the Summer Olympic Games. It was originally played as a demonstration sport in seven Olympics—1912, 1936, 1952, 1956, 1964, 1984, and 1988— more than for any other sport in Olympic history. These exhibitions featured a single game at the first five Olympic appearances and then a tournament format in 1984 and 1988. The International Olympic Committee (IOC) granted baseball official status on October 13, 1986, for the 1992 Summer Olympics. The sport was contested at each subsequent Games through 2008, after which the IOC removed it from the roster of Olympic sports.

In 1992, the first official Olympic baseball tournament was won by the Cuban team. Cuba had boycotted the 1984 and 1988 Olympics, missing the previous exhibition baseball tournaments, but entered in 1992 as the favorite, having won the past 12 world championships and with a 62–1 record in international competitions since 1986. The Cubans went undefeated in the 1992 Olympics and trailed in only one game. They went undefeated again at the 1996 Olympics en route to a second consecutive gold medal. The United States won their first medal (bronze) in the 1996 Olympics and then won gold at the 2000 Summer Olympics. 2000 was the first Olympics in which Cuba lost a game: first to the Dutch team in round-robin play and then again to the Americans in the gold medal game. This was also the first time professional players were allowed to compete in baseball, though Major League Baseball (MLB) did not permit any player on the 40-man roster of an MLB team to compete. In 2004, the reigning gold medalist United States did not qualify for the Olympic tournament, while the Cuban team won its third gold medal.

In 2005, the IOC investigated the addition of sports to the Olympic schedule including golf, rugby sevens, and karate. The IOC voted on July 8, 2005, to remove baseball and softball from the 2012 Summer Olympics roster, the first sports removed from the Olympics since polo in 1936. A variety of factors were cited for removing baseball including the absence of MLB players, problems with performance-enhancing drugs, and the high cost of constructing a baseball stadium. Appeals to reinstate both sports for 2012 were rejected. Baseball was still played at the 2008 Summer Olympics in Beijing, however, and the South Korean team beat Cuba to claim their first gold medal in the event. The international governing bodies of several sports, including baseball, petitioned the IOC in 2009 to fill two sport slots at the 2016 Olympics. IOC President Jacques Rogge said they were "looking for an added value – wide appeal, especially for young people." The IOC ultimately voted to fill the two available slots for 2016 with rugby and golf. However, the IOC ultimately approved the return of baseball and softball to the Olympic program for the 2020 Summer Olympics in Tokyo in 2016.

Baseball was open only to male amateurs in 1992 and 1996. As a result, the Americans and other nations where professional baseball is developed relied on collegiate players, while Cubans used their most experienced veterans, who technically were considered amateurs as they nominally held other jobs, but in fact trained full-time. In 2000, pros were admitted, but MLB refused to release its players in 2000, 2004, and 2008, and the situation changed only a little: the Cubans still used their best players, while the Americans started using minor leaguers. The IOC cited the absence of the best players as the main reason for baseball being dropped from the Olympic program.

Cuba has been the most successful team, winning the most gold and silver medals and never finishing outside the podium. Cuban pitcher Pedro Luis Lazo is the most successful individual athlete, winning four medals—two gold and two silver—from 1996 to 2008. No American ever appeared in the Olympics more than once. Nine other Cuban players won three medals; no player from any other nation accomplished this feat. From the 25 athletes who won two medals in baseball, 18 were Cuban, while the remaining seven included 4 South Korean and 3 Japanese players.

== Medal winners ==
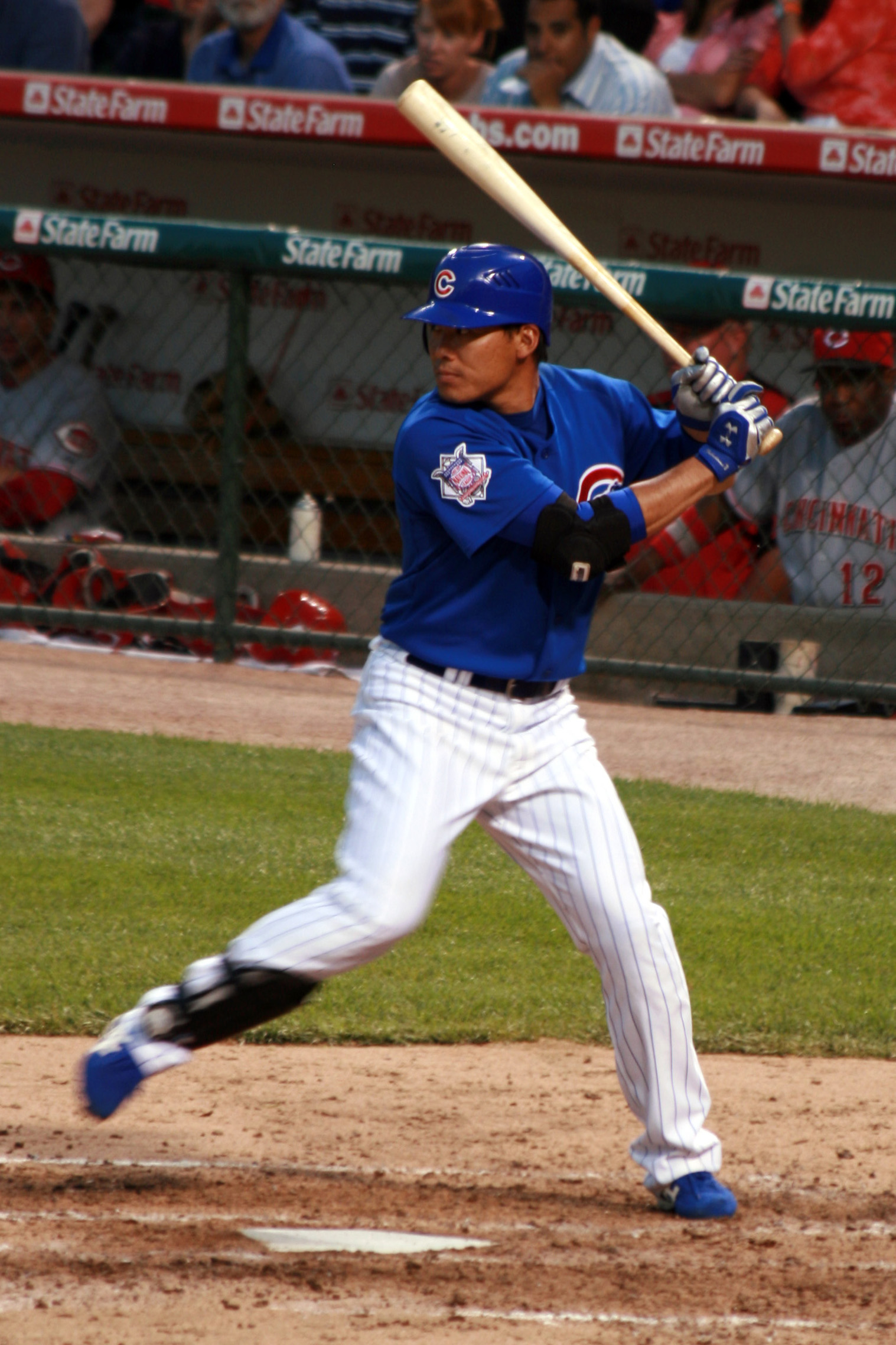
Japanese player Kosuke Fukudome won silver in 1996 and bronze in 2004, one of seven non-Cuban players to win multiple medals in baseball.

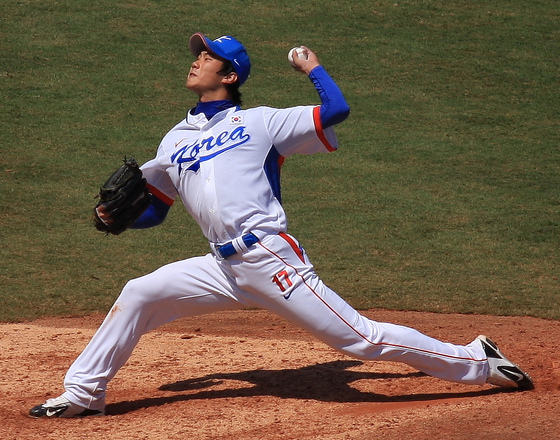
Kim Kwang-Hyun won gold with South Korea in 2008, Korea's second medal finish in baseball.

Event	Gold	Silver	Bronze
1992 Barcelona	Cuba; Omar Ajete; Rolando Arrojo; José Raúl Delgado Diez; Giorge Diaz Loren; Osvaldo Fernández; José Estrada González; Lourdes Gourriel; Orlando Hernández; Alberto Hernández; Orestes Kindelán; Omar Linares; Germán Mesa; Víctor Mesa; Antonio Pacheco; Juan Padilla; Luis Ulacia; Ermidelio Urrutia; Jorge Luis Valdés; Lázaro Vargas	Chinese Taipei; Chang Cheng-Hsien; Chang Wen-Chung; Chang Yaw-Teing; Chen Chi-Hsin; Chen Wei-Chen; Chiang Tai-Chuan; Huang Chung-Yi; Huang Wen-Po; Jong Yeu-Jeng; Ku Kuo-Chian; Kuo Lee Chien-Fu; Liao Ming-Hsiung; Lin Chao-Huang; Lin Kun-Han; Lo Chen-Jung; Lo Kuo-Chong; Pai Kun-Hong; Tsai Ming-Hung; Wang Kuang-Shih; Wu Shih-Hsih	Japan; Tomohito Ito; Shinichiro Kawabata; Masahito Kohiyama; Hirotami Kojima; Hiroki Kokubo; Takashi Miwa; Hiroshi Nakamoto; Masafumi Nishi; Kazutaka Nishiyama; Koichi Oshima; Hiroyuki Sakaguchi; Shinichi Sato; Yasuhiro Sato; Masanori Sugiura; Kento Sugiyama; Yasunori Takami; Akihiro Togo; Koji Tokunaga; Shigeki Wakabayashi; Katsumi Watanabe
1996 Atlanta	Cuba; Omar Ajete; Miguel Caldés Luis; José Contreras; Jorge Fumero; José Estrada González; Alberto Hernández; Rey Isaac; Orestes Kindelán; Pedro Luis Lazo; Omar Linares; Omar Luis; Juan Manrique; Eliecer Montes de Oca; Antonio Pacheco; Juan Padilla; Eduardo Paret; Ormari Romero; Antonio Scull; Luis Ulacia; Lázaro Vargas	Japan; Kosuke Fukudome; Tadahito Iguchi; Makoto Imaoka; Takeo Kawamura; Jutaro Kimura; Takashi Kurosu; Takao Kuwamoto; Nobuhiko Matsunaka; Koichi Misawa; Masahiko Mori; Masao Morinaka; Daishin Nakamura; Masahiro Nojima; Hideaki Okubo; Hitoshi Ono; Yasuyuki Saigo; Tomoaki Sato; Masanori Sugiura; Takayuki Takabayashi; Yoshitomo Tani	United States; Chad Allen; Kris Benson; R. A. Dickey; Troy Glaus; Chad Green; Seth Greisinger; Kip Harkrider; A. J. Hinch; Jacque Jones; Billy Koch; Mark Kotsay; Matt Lecroy; Travis Lee; Braden Looper; Brian Loyd; Warren Morris; Augie Ojeda; Jim Parque; Jeff Weaver; Jason Williams
2000 Sydney	United States; Brent Abernathy; Kurt Ainsworth; Pat Borders; Sean Burroughs; John Cotton; Travis Dawkins; Adam Everett; Ryan Franklin; Chris George; Shane Heams; Marcus Jensen; Mike Kinkade; Rick Krivda; Doug Mientkiewicz; Mike Neill; Roy Oswalt; Jon Rauch; Anthony Sanders; Bobby Seay; Ben Sheets; Brad Wilkerson; Todd Williams; Ernie Young; Tim Young	Cuba; Omar Ajete; Yovany Aragon; Miguel Caldés; Danel Castro; José Contreras; Yobal Dueñas; Yasser Gómez; José Ibar; Orestes Kindelán; Pedro Luis Lazo; Omar Linares; Oscar Macías; Juan Manrique; Javier Méndez; Rolando Meriño; Germán Mesa; Antonio Pacheco; Ariel Pestano; Gabriel Pierre; Maels Rodríguez; Antonio Scull; Luis Ulacia; Lázaro Valle; Norge Luis Vera	South Korea; Chong Tae-Hyon; Chung Min-Tae; Chung Soo-Keun; Hong Sung-Heon; Jang Sung-Ho; Jin Pil-jung; Kim Dong-Joo; Kim Han-Soo; Kim Ki-Tae; Kim Soo-Kyung; Kim Tae-gyun; Koo Dae-Sung; Lee Byung-Kyu; Lee Seung-Ho; Lee Seung-Yeop; Lim Chang-Yong; Lim Sun-Dong; Park Jae-Hong; Park Jin-Man; Park Jong-Ho; Park Kyung-Oan; Park Seok-Jin; Son Min-Han; Song Jin-Woo
2004 Athens	Cuba; Danny Betancourt; Luis Borroto; Frederich Cepeda; Yorelvis Charles; Michel Enríquez; Norberto González; Yuli Gurriel; Pedro Luis Lazo; Roger Machado; Jonder Martínez; Frank Montieth; Vicyohandri Odelín; Adiel Palma; Eduardo Paret; Ariel Pestano; Alexei Ramírez; Eriel Sánchez; Antonio Scull; Carlos Tabares; Yoandry Urgellés; Osmani Urrutia; Manuel Vega; Norge Luis Vera	Australia; Craig Anderson; Thomas Brice; Adrian Burnside; Gavin Fingleson; Paul Gonzalez; Nick Kimpton; Brendan Kingman; Craig Lewis; Graeme Lloyd; Dave Nilsson; Trent Oeltjen; Wayne Ough; Chris Oxspring; Brett Roneberg; Ryan Rowland-Smith; John Stephens; Phil Stockman; Brett Tamburrino; Richard Thompson; Andrew Utting; Rodney Van Buizen; Ben Wigmore; Glenn Williams; Jeff Williams	Japan; Ryoji Aikawa; Yuya Ando; Atsushi Fujimoto; Kosuke Fukudome; Hirotoshi Ishii; Hisashi Iwakuma; Hitoki Iwase; Kenji Johjima; Makoto Kaneko; Takuya Kimura; Masahide Kobayashi; Hiroki Kuroda; Daisuke Matsuzaka; Daisuke Miura; Shinya Miyamoto; Arihito Muramatsu; Norihiro Nakamura; Michihiro Ogasawara; Naoyuki Shimizu; Yoshinobu Takahashi; Yoshitomo Tani; Koji Uehara; Kazuhiro Wada; Tsuyoshi Wada
2008 Beijing	South Korea; Bong Jung-Keun; Chong Tae-hyon; Han Ki-joo; Jang Won-sam; Jeong Keun-woo; Jin Kab-yong; Kang Min-ho; Kim Dong-joo; Kim Hyun-Soo; Kim Kwang-hyun; Park Jin-man; Kim Min-jae; Ko Young-min; Kwon Hyuk; Lee Dae-Ho; Lee Jin-young; Lee Jong-Wook; Lee Seung-yeop; Lee Taek-keun; Lee Yong-kyu; Oh Seung-hwan; Ryu Hyun-Jin; Song Seung-jun; Yoon Suk-min	Cuba; Alexei Bell; Frederich Cepeda; Alfredo Despaigne; Giorvis Duvergel; Michel Enríquez; Norberto González; Yulieski Gourriel; Miguel Lahera; Pedro Luis Lazo; Jonder Martínez; Alexander Mayeta; Rolando Meriño; Luis Navas; Héctor Olivera; Vicyohandri Odelín; Adiel Palma; Eduardo Paret; Yadier Pedroso; Ariel Pestano; Luis Rodríguez; Elier Sánchez; Eriel Sánchez; Yoandry Urgellés; Norge Luis Vera	United States; Brett Anderson; Jake Arrieta; Brian Barden; Matt Brown; Trevor Cahill; Jeremy Cummings; Jason Donald; Brian Duensing; Dexter Fowler; John Gall; Mike Hessman; Kevin Jepsen; Brandon Knight; Michael Koplove; Matt LaPorta; Lou Marson; Blaine Neal; Jayson Nix; Nate Schierholtz; Jeff Stevens; Stephen Strasburg; Taylor Teagarden; Terry Tiffee; Casey Weathers
2012–2016	Not included in the Olympic program		
2020 Tokyo	Japan; Kōyō Aoyagi; Suguru Iwazaki; Masato Morishita; Hiromi Itoh; Yoshinobu Yamamoto; Masahiro Tanaka; Yasuaki Yamasaki; Ryoji Kuribayashi; Yūdai Ōno; Kodai Senga; Kaima Taira; Ryutaro Umeno; Takuya Kai; Tetsuto Yamada; Sōsuke Genda; Hideto Asamura; Ryosuke Kikuchi; Hayato Sakamoto; Munetaka Murakami; Kensuke Kondo; Yuki Yanagita; Ryoya Kurihara; Masataka Yoshida; Seiya Suzuki	United States; Shane Baz; Anthony Carter; Brandon Dickson; Anthony Gose; Edwin Jackson; Scott Kazmir; Nick Martinez; Scott McGough; David Robertson; Joe Ryan; Ryder Ryan; Simeon Woods Richardson; Tim Federowicz; Mark Kolozsvary; Nick Allen; Eddy Alvarez; Triston Casas; Todd Frazier; Jamie Westbrook; Tyler Austin; Eric Filia; Patrick Kivlehan; Jack López; Bubba Starling	Dominican Republic; Darío Álvarez; Gabriel Arias; Jairo Asencio; Luis Felipe Castillo; Jumbo Díaz; Junior García; Jhan Mariñez; Cristopher Mercedes; Denyi Reyes; Ramón Rosso; Ángel Sánchez; Raúl Valdés; Roldani Baldwin; Charlie Valerio; José Bautista; Juan Francisco; Jeison Guzmán; Erick Mejia; Gustavo Núñez; Emilio Bonifácio; Melky Cabrera; Johan Mieses; Yefri Pérez; Julio Rodríguez
2024	Not included in the Olympic program		
2028 Los Angeles			

== Athlete medal leaders ==
Athletes who won at least two gold medals or three total medals are listed below.

Athlete	Nation	Olympics	Total	Gold	Silver	Bronze
Pedro Luis Lazo	Cuba	1996–2008	4	2	2	0
Omar Ajete	Cuba	1992–2000	3	2	1	0
Orestes Kindelán	Cuba	1992–2000	3	2	1	0
Omar Linares	Cuba	1992–2000	3	2	1	0
Antonio Pacheco	Cuba	1992–2000	3	2	1	0
Eduardo Paret	Cuba	1996; 2004–2008	3	2	1	0
Antonio Scull	Cuba	1996; 2004–2008	3	2	1	0
Luis Ulacia	Cuba	1992–2000	3	2	1	0
Ariel Pestano	Cuba	2000–2008	3	1	2	0
Norge Luis Vera	Cuba	2000–2008	3	1	2	0
José Estrada González	Cuba	1992–1996	2	2	0	0
Alberto Hernández	Cuba	1992–1996	2	2	0	0
Juan Padilla	Cuba	1992–1996	2	2	0	0
Lázaro Vargas	Cuba	1992–1996	2	2	0	0

== See also ==
- Baseball awards
- Baseball at the Summer Olympics
- Baseball World Cup
- Women's Baseball World Cup
- Intercontinental Cup (baseball)
- World Baseball Classic
- List of Asian Games medalists in baseball
