= Japan at the 1992 Summer Olympics =

- IOC code: JPN
- NOC: Japanese Olympic Committee

in Barcelona
- Competitors: 256 (175 men and 81 women) in 24 sports
- Flag bearer: Kumi Nakada
- Medals Ranked 17th: Gold 3 Silver 8 Bronze 11 Total 22

Summer Olympics appearances (overview)
- 1912; 1920; 1924; 1928; 1932; 1936; 1948; 1952; 1956; 1960; 1964; 1968; 1972; 1976; 1980; 1984; 1988; 1992; 1996; 2000; 2004; 2008; 2012; 2016; 2020; 2024

Japan competed at the 1992 Summer Olympics in Barcelona, Spain. 256 competitors, 175 men and 81 women, took part in 166 events in 24 sports.

== Medalists ==
Medal	Name	Sport	Event	Date
Gold	Kyoko Iwasaki	Swimming	Women's 200 m breaststroke	July 27
Gold	Hidehiko Yoshida	Judo	Men's half middleweight	July 30
Gold	Toshihiko Koga	Judo	Men's lightweight	July 31
Silver	Naoya Ogawa	Judo	Men's heavyweight	July 27
Silver	Yoko Tanabe	Judo	Women's half heavyweight	July 28
Silver	Noriko Mizoguchi	Judo	Women's half lightweight	August 1
Silver	Yuko Arimori	Athletics	Women's marathon	August 1
Silver	Ryoko Tani	Judo	Women's extra lightweight	August 2
Silver	Kazumi Watanabe	Shooting	Mixed trap	August 2
Silver	Yukio Iketani	Gymnastics	Men's floor	August 2
Silver	Koichi Morishita	Athletics	Men's marathon	August 9
Bronze	Yoko Sakaue	Judo	Women's heavyweight	July 27
Bronze	Hirotaka Okada	Judo	Men's middleweight	July 29
Bronze	Chiyori Tateno	Judo	Women's lightweight	July 31
Bronze	Ryohei Koba	Shooting	Men's rifle three positions	July 31
Bronze	Masayuki Matsunaga	Gymnastics	Men's parallel bars	August 2
Bronze	Masayuki Matsunaga; Daisuke Nishikawa; Yutaka Aihara; Takashi Chinen; Yoshiaki Hatakeda; Yukio Iketani	Gymnastics	Men's team all-around	August 2
Bronze	Tadanori Koshino	Judo	Men's extra lightweight	August 2
Bronze	Kosei Akaishi	Wrestling	Men's freestyle 68 kg	August 5
Bronze	Shigeki Wakabayashi; Katsumi Watanabe; Yasunori Takami; Akihiro Togo; Koji Tokunaga; Yasuhiro Sato; Masanori Sugiura; Kento Sugiyama; Koichi Oshima; Hiroyuki Sakaguchi; Shinichi Sato; Hiroshi Nakamoto; Kazutaka Nishiyama; Masafumi Nishi; Hirotami Kojima; Hiroki Kokubo; Takashi Miwa; Tomohito Ito; Shinichiro Kawabata; Masahito Kohiyama	Baseball	Men's tournament	August 5
Bronze	Fumiko Okuno	Synchronized swimming	Women's solo	August 6
Bronze	Fumiko Okuno; Aki Takayama	Synchronized swimming	Women's duet	August 7

Medals by sport
Sport	1st place, gold medalist(s)	2nd place, silver medalist(s)	3rd place, bronze medalist(s)	Total
Judo	2	4	4	10
Swimming	1	0	0	1
Athletics	0	2	0	2
Gymnastics	0	1	2	3
Shooting	0	1	1	2
Synchronized swimming	0	0	2	2
Baseball	0	0	1	1
Wrestling	0	0	1	1
Total	3	8	11	22

== Competitors ==
The following is the list of number of competitors in the Games.

Sport	Men	Women	Total
Archery	3	3	6
Athletics	22	9	31
Badminton	5	6	11
Baseball	20	–	20
Boxing	4	–	4
Canoeing	3	3	6
Cycling	9	3	12
Diving	2	1	3
Equestrian	9	0	9
Fencing	5	1	6
Gymnastics	6	5	11
Judo	7	7	14
Modern pentathlon	1	–	1
Rowing	11	2	13
Sailing	5	2	7
Shooting	8	3	11
Swimming	12	13	25
Synchronized swimming	–	3	3
Table tennis	4	4	8
Tennis	1	4	5
Volleyball	12	12	24
Weightlifting	10	–	10
Wrestling	16	–	16
Total	175	81	256

== Archery ==
In the nation's fifth Olympic archery competition, five of Japan's six archers failed to qualify for the elimination round. The one that did, Hiroshi Yamamoto, lost his match. Both teams lost their first matches in the team round as well.

Women's Individual Competition:

- Keiko Nakagomi — Ranking round, 47th place (0-0)
- Reiko Fujita — Ranking round, 48th place (0-0)
- Yukiko Ikeda — Ranking round, 49th place (0-0)

Men's Individual Competition:

- Hiroshi Yamamoto — Round of 32, 17th place (0-1)
- Naoto Oku — Ranking round, 47th place (0-0)
- Kiyokazu Nishikawa— Ranking round, 61st place (0-0)

Women's Team Competition:

- Nakagomi, Fujita, and Ikeda — Round of 16, 14th place (0-1)

Men's Team Competition:

- Yamamoto, Oku, and Nishikawa — Round of 16, 15th place (0-1)

== Athletics ==
Men's 100 metres

- Tatsuo Sugimoto

- Heat — 10.56 (→ did not advance)

Men's 10,000 metres

- Haruo Urata

- Heat — 28:24.08
- Final — 28:37.61 (→ 14th place)

- Sakae Osaki

- Heat — 29:20.01 (→ did not advance)

Men's 4 × 400 m Relay

- Masayoshi Kan, Susumu Takano, Yoshihiko Saito, and Takahiro Watanabe

- Heat — 3:01.35 (→ did not advance)

Men's Marathon

- Koichi Morishita — 2:13.45 (→ Silver Medal)
- Takeyuki Nakayama — 2:14.02 (→ 4th place)
- Hiromi Taniguchi — 2:14.42 (→ 8th place)

Men's 50 km Walk

- Fumio Imamura — 4:07:45 (→ 18th place)
- Takehiro Sonohara — 4:13:22 (→ 22nd place)
- Tadahiro Kosaka — 4:14:24 (→ 24th place)

Men's 110m Hurdles

- Toshihiko Iwasaki

- Quarterfinals — 13.88 (→ did not advance)

Men's 400m Hurdles

- Kazuhiko Yamazaki

- Heat — 50.30 (→ did not advance)

- Yoshihiko Saito

- Heat — 49.01 (→ did not advance)

Men's Javelin Throw

- Masami Yoshida

- Qualification — 72.88 m (→ did not advance)

Men's Long Jump

- Masaki Morinaga

- Qualification — 7.79 m (→ did not advance)

Men's Triple Jump

- Norifumi Yamashita

- Qualification — 15.97 m (→ did not advance)

Women's 10,000 metres

- Izumi Maki

- Heat — 32:07.91
- Final — 31:55.06 (→ 12th place)

- Miki Igarashi

- Heat — 32:45.47
- Final — 32:09.58 (→ 14th place)

- Hiromi Suzuki

- Heat — 34:29.64 (→ did not advance)

Women's 10 km Walk

- Miki Itakura

- Final — 47:11 (→ 23rd place)

- Yuko Sato

- Final — 47:43 (→ 24th place)

Women's Marathon

- Yuko Arimori — 2:32.49 (→ Silver Medal)
- Sachiko Yamashita — 2:36.26 (→ 4th place)
- Yumi Kokamo — 2:58.18 (→ 29th place)

Women's High Jump

- Megumi Sato

- Qualification — 1.92 m
- Final — 1.91 m (→ 7th place)

== Baseball ==
Japan was one of the eight teams to play in the first Olympic baseball tournament. In the preliminary round, the Japanese team defeated the United States and four other teams, but lost to Cuba and Chinese Taipei to come in third place in the round after those two teams. In the semifinal, Japan again played against Taipei, losing once more to be relegated to the bronze medal game. There, they again faced the United States and repeated their victory to take home the medal.

Men's Team Competition:

- Japan → Bronze Medal (6-3)

Team Roster

- Tomohito Ito
- Shinichiro Kawabata
- Masahito Kohiyama
- Hirotami Kojima
- Hiroki Kokubo
- Takashi Miwa
- Hiroshi Nakamoto
- Masafumi Nishi
- Kazutaka Nishiyama
- Koichi Oshima
- Hiroyuki Sakaguchi
- Shinichi Sato
- Yasuhiro Sato
- Masanori Sugiura
- Kento Sugiyama
- Yasunori Takami
- Akihiro Togo
- Koji Tokunaga
- Shigeki Wakabayashi
- Katsumi Watanabe

== Boxing ==
Men's Light Flyweight (– 48 kg)

- Tadahiro Sasaki

- First Round — Defeated Domenic Figliomeni (CAN), 5:3
- Second Round — Lost to Valentin Barbu (ROM), 7:10

Men's Lightweight (– 60 kg)

- Shigeyuki Dobashi

- First Round — Defeated Delroy Leslie (JAM), 11:5
- Second Round — Lost to Julien Lorcy (FRA), RSC-2

Men's Welterweight (– 67 kg)

- Masashi Kawakami

- First Round — Lost to Adrian Dodson (GBR), RSC-3

Men's Light-Middleweight (– 71 kg)

- Hiroshi Nagashima

- First Round — Lost to Maselino Masoe (ASA), RSCI-3 (00:54)

== Cycling ==
Twelve cyclists, nine men and three women, represented Japan in 1992.

Men's road race

- Tomokazu Fujino
- Kozo Fujita
- Mitsuteru Tanaka

Men's sprint

- Keiji Kojima

Men's 1 km time trial

- Keiji Kojima

Men's individual pursuit

- Masamitsu Ehara

Men's team pursuit

- Yasuhiro Ando
- Masamitsu Ehara
- Naokiyo Hashisako
- Makio Madarame

Men's points race

- Hiroshi Daimon

Women's road race

- Yumiko Suzuki — 2:29:22 (→ 50th place)

Women's sprint

- Mika Kuroki

Women's individual pursuit

- Seiko Hashimoto

== Diving ==
Men's 3m Springboard

- Isao Yamagishi

- Preliminary Round — 344.40 points (→ did not advance, 21st place)

- Keita Kaneto

- Preliminary Round — 295.74 points (→ did not advance, 31st place)

Men's 10m Platform

- Keita Kaneto

- Preliminary Round — 391.05 points
- Final — 529.14 points (→ 8th place)

- Isao Yamagishi

- Preliminary Round — 331.23 (→ did not advance, 18th place)

Women's 3m Springboard

- Yuki Motobuchi

- Preliminary Round — 301.23 points
- Final — 443.76 points (→ 11th place)

Women's 10m Platform

- Yuki Motobuchi

- Preliminary Round — 239.01 points (→ did not advance, 26th place)

== Fencing ==
Six fencers, five men and one woman, represented Japan in 1992.

Men's foil

- Yoshihide Nagano
- Hiroki Ichigatani
- Kinya Abe

Men's épée

- Norikazu Tanabe

Men's sabre

- Hiroshi Hashimoto

Women's foil

- Yuko Takayanagi

== Modern pentathlon ==
One male pentathlete represented Japan in 1992.

Men's Individual Competition

- Hiroshi Miyagahara — 4859 points (→ 48th place)

== Sailing ==
Women's 470 Class

- Yumiko Shige and Alicia Kinoshita

- Final Ranking — 53.7 points (→ 5th place)

== Swimming ==
Men's 50 m Freestyle

- Toshiaki Kurasawa

- Heat — 24.61 (→ did not advance, 47th place)

Men's 100 m Freestyle

- Tsutomu Nakano

- Heat — 51.63 (→ did not advance, 34th place)

- Shigeo Ogata

- Heat — 52.74 (→ did not advance, 45th place)

Men's 200 m Freestyle

- Shigeo Ogata

- Heat — 1:53.42 (→ did not advance, 30th place)

- Toshiaki Kurasawa

- Heat — 1:53.75 (→ did not advance, 31st place)

Men's 400 m Freestyle

- Shigeo Ogata

- Heat — 3:57.91 (→ did not advance, 24th place)

- Masashi Kato

- Heat — 4:00.66 (→ did not advance, 33rd place)

Men's 1500 m Freestyle

- Masashi Kato

- Heat — 15:40.94 (→ did not advance, 16th place)

Men's 100 m Backstroke

- Hajime Itoi

- Heat — 56.18
- B-Final — 56.64 (→ 12th place)

- Keita Soraoka

- Heat — 57.64 (→ did not advance, 27th place)

Men's 200 m Backstroke

- Hajime Itoi

- Heat — 1:59.95
- Final — 1:59.52 (→ 4th place)

- Keita Soraoka

- Heat — 2:03.10 (→ did not advance, 20th place)

Men's 100 m Breaststroke

- Akira Hayashi

- Heat — 1:01.76
- Final — 1:01.86 (→ 4th place)

- Kenji Watanabe

- Heat — 1:03.29 (→ did not advance, 18th place)

Men's 200 m Breaststroke

- Kenji Watanabe

- Heat — 2:14.35
- Final — 2:14.70 (→ 7th place)

- Akira Hayashi

- Heat — 2:14.61
- Final — 2:15.11 (→ 8th place)

Men's 100 m Butterfly

- Keiichi Kawanaka

- Heat — 55.18 (→ did not advance, 20th place)

- Tomohiro Miyoshi

- Heat — 55.98 (→ did not advance, 34th place)

Men's 200 m Butterfly

- Keiichi Kawanaka

- Heat — 1:59.96
- Final — 1:58.97 (→ 5th place)

- Tomohiro Miyoshi

- Heat — 2:01.27 (→ did not advance, 17th place)

Men's 200 m Individual Medley

- Tatsuya Kinugasa

- Heat — 2:03.32
- B-Final — 2:04.29 (→ 13th place)

- Takahiro Fujimoto

- Heat — 2:04.89
- Final — 2:07.74 (→ 15th place)

Men's 400 m Individual Medley

- Takahiro Fujimoto

- Heat — 4:20.07
- Final — 4:23.80 (→ 8th place)

- Toshiaki Kurasawa

- Heat — DSQ (→ did not advance, no ranking)

Men's 4 × 100 m Medley Relay

- Hajime Itoi, Akira Hayashi, Keiichi Kawanaka, and Tsutomu Nakano

- Heat — 3:43.88
- Final — 3:43.25 (→ 8th place)

Women's 50 m Freestyle

- Ayako Nakano

- Heat — 26.74 (→ did not advance, 20th place)

- Shina Matsudo

- Heat — 27.36 (→ did not advance, 34th place)

Women's 100 m Freestyle

- Suzu Chiba

- Heat — 56.26
- B-Final — 55.97 (→ 9th place)

- Ayako Nakano

- Heat — 57.71 (→ did not advance, 22nd place)

Women's 200 m Freestyle

- Suzu Chiba

- Heat — 2:00.96
- Final — 2:00.64 (→ 6th place)

- Yoko Koikawa

- Heat — 2:03.32 (→ did not advance, 17th place)

Women's 400 m Freestyle

- Suzu Chiba

- Heat — 4:13.85
- Final — 4:15.71 (→ 8th place)

Women's 100 m Backstroke

- Yoko Koikawa

- Heat — 1:02.83
- Final — 1:03.23 (→ 8th place)

- Noriko Inada

- Heat — 1:03.21
- B-Final — 1:03.42 (→ 12th place)

Women's 200 m Backstroke

- Junko Torikai

- Heat — 2:16.13
- B-Final — 2:15.20 (→ 11th place)

- Noriko Inada

- Heat — 2:15.74
- B-Final — 2:17.68 (→ 15th place)

Women's 100 m Breaststroke

- Kyoko Iwasaki

- Heat — 1:11.00
- B-Final — 1:11.16 (→ 13th place)

- Kyoko Kasuya

- Heat — 1:11.60 (→ did not advance, 17th place)

Women's 200 m Breaststroke

- Kyoko Iwasaki

- Heat — 2:27.78
- Final — 2:26.65 (→ Gold Medal)

- Kyoko Kasuya

- Heat — 2:32.55
- B-Final — 2:32.97 (→ 13th place)

Women's 100 m Butterfly

- Rie Shito

- Heat — 1:01.04
- Final — 1:01.16 (→ 8th place)

- Yoko Kando

- Heat — 1:01.56
- B-Final — 1:01.32 (→ 11th place)

Women's 200 m Butterfly

- Mika Haruna

- Heat — 2:11.21
- Final — 2:09.88 (→ 4th place)

- Rie Shito

- Heat — 2:11.00
- Final — 2:10.24 (→ 5th place)

Women's 200 m Individual Medley

- Hideko Hiranaka

- Heat — 2:18.13
- B-Final — 2:18.47 (→ 9th place)

- Eri Kimura

- Heat — 2:18.63
- B-Final — 2:18.91 (→ 12th place)

Women's 400 m Individual Medley

- Hideko Hiranaka

- Heat — 4:47.92
- Final — 4:46.24 (→ 5th place)

- Eri Kimura

- Heat — 4:46.17
- Final — 4:47.78 (→ 7th place)

Women's 4 × 100 m Freestyle Relay

- Ayako Nakano, Yoko Koikawa, Shina Matsudo, and Suzu Chiba

- Heat — 3:49.91 (→ did not advance, 10th place)

Women's 4 × 100 m Medley Relay

- Yoko Koikawa, Kyoko Iwasaki, Yoko Kando, and Suzu Chiba

- Heat — 4:11.48
- Final — 4:09.92 (→ 7th place)

== Synchronized swimming ==
Three synchronized swimmers represented Japan in 1992.

Women's solo

- Fumiko Okuno
- Mikako Kotani
- Aki Takayama

Women's duet

- Fumiko Okuno
- Aki Takayama

== Tennis ==
Men's Singles Competition

- Shuzo Matsuoka

- First round — Lost to Renzo Furlan (Italy) 4-6, 3-6, 6-3, 4-6

Women's double

- Maya Kidowaki and Kimiko Date

- Third round — lost to Jana Novotná and Andrea Strnadová 6–3, 7–6(4).

== Volleyball ==
=== Men's team competition ===
- Preliminary Round (Group A)

- Defeated United States (3-1)
- Lost to France (2-3)
- Lost to Italy (0-3)
- Lost to Spain (2-3)
- Defeated Canada (3-2)

- Quarterfinals

- Lost to Brazil (0-3)

- Classification Matches

- 5th/8th place: Defeated Unified Team (3-2)
- 5th/6th place: Lost to Italy (0-3) → Sixth place

- Team Roster

- Takashi Narita
- Katsumi Kawano
- Yuichi Nakagaichi
- Akihiko Matsuda
- Masafumi Oura
- Tatsuya Ueta
- Masaji Ogino
- Katsuyuki Minami
- Shigeru Aoyama
- Junichi Kuriuzawa
- Hideyuki Otake
- Masayuki Izumikawa

=== Women's team competition ===
- Preliminary Round (Group A)

- Defeated United States (3-2)
- Defeated Spain (3-0)
- Lost to Unified Team (0-3)

- Quarterfinals

- Lost to Brazil (1-3)

- Classification Matches

- 5th/6th place: Defeated the Netherlands (3-1) → Fifth place

- Team Roster

- Ichiko Sato
- Kumi Nakada
- Michiyo Ishikake
- Chieko Nakanishi
- Motoko Obayashi
- Yukiko Takahashi
- Ikuyo Namura
- Mika Yamauchi
- Asako Tajimi
- Tomoko Yoshihara
- Kiyoko Fukuda
- Kazumi Nakamura
