= Hirotami =

- Gender: Male

Origin
- Origin: Japanese
- Meaning: Different meanings depending on the kanji used

Hirotami (written: 広民 or 啓民) is a masculine Japanese given name. Notable people with the name include:

- Hirotami Kojima (小島 啓民) (born 1964), Japanese baseball player
- Kuze Hirotami (久世 広民) (1737–1800), Japanese government official
