= Kawanaka =

Kawanaka (written: 川中) is a Japanese surname. Notable people with the surname include:

- Kaori Kawanaka (川中 香緒里, born 1991), Japanese archer
- Keiichi Kawanaka (川中 恵一, born 1973), Japanese swimmer
- Miyuki Kawanaka (川中 美幸, born 1955), Japanese enka singer
