= Antonio Salazar (disambiguation) =

António de Oliveira Salazar (1889–1970) was Prime Minister of Portugal from 1932 to 1968

Tony or Antonio Salazar may also refer to:

- Antonio Sebastián Álvarez de Toledo y Salazar (1622–1715), Spanish nobleman and diplomat
- Antonio de Salazar (composer) (c.1650–1715), Mexican composer
- Tony Salazar (born 1949), Mexican luchador and ring announcer
- Antonio Salazar (baseball) (born 1965), former Spanish baseball player
- Antonio Salazar (footballer) (1989–2022), Mexican footballer
