= Masahito =

Masahito is a male Japanese name, that has been used for members of The Japanese Imperial Family. Although written romanized the same way, the kanji can be different.

Masahito may refer to:

- Prince Masahito (雅仁親王, Masahito-shinnō; 1127–1192), later Emperor Go-Shirakawa (後白河天皇)
- Prince Masahito (誠仁親王, Masahito-shinnō; 1552-1586), eldest son of Emperor Ōgimachi (正親町天皇)
- Masahito, Prince Hitachi (常陸宮正仁親王; born 1935), the youngest son of Emperor Shōwa of Japan
- Masahito, Tsunokai (角皆 優人; born 1955), former Japanese national freestyle ski champion
- Masahito Kakihara (垣原 賢人; born 1972), Japanese professional wrestler
- Masahito Kohiyama (小桧山 雅仁; born 1969), Japanese baseball player
- Masahito Ono (小野 雅史; born 1996), Japanese footballer
- Masahito Onoda (小野田 将人; born 1996), Japanese footballer
- Masahito Yamamoto (山本 正人; born 1978), Japanese rugby union player
