= Shina Matsudo =

Japanese swimmer

Personal information
- Born: October 27, 1973 (age 52) Iwate, Japan

Sport
- Sport: Swimming

Shina Matsudo (松戸 思奈, Matsudo Shina) (born October 27, 1973) is a retired female freestyle swimmer from Japan, who represented her native country at the 1992 Summer Olympics. Her best result in two starts in Barcelona was the 10th place (3:49.91) in the Women's 4×100 metres Freestyle Relay event, alongside Ayako Nakano, Yoko Koikawa and Suzu Chiba.
