= Kuo Lee Chien-fu =

Taiwanese baseball player and coach

- Pitcher
- Born: 24 March 1969 (age 57); Pingzhen, Taoyuan County, Taiwan
- Batted: Right Threw: Right

Professional debut
- NPB: May 20, 1993, for the Hanshin Tigers
- CPBL: March 16, 1999, for the Koos Group Whales

Last appearance
- NPB: 1998, for the Hanshin Tigers
- CPBL: September 13, 2003, for the Chinatrust Whales

NPB statistics
- Win–loss record: 27–31
- Earned run average: 3.50
- Strikeouts: 299

CPBL statistics
- Win–loss record: 38–25
- Earned run average: 2.68
- Strikeouts: 415
- Stats at Baseball Reference

Teams
- Hanshin Tigers (1993–1998); Koos Group Whales/Chinatrust Whales (1999–2003)

Career highlights and awards
- 5× CPBL All-Star (1999–2003); CPBL saves leader (2002)
Medals
Representing Chinese Taipei
Men's baseball
Olympic Games
Silver medal – second place	1992 Barcelona	Team
World Cup
Bronze medal – third place	1988 Italy	Team
Bronze medal – third place	2001 Taiwan	Team
Asian Games
Bronze medal – third place	1998 Bangkok	Team
Asian Championship
Gold medal – first place	1989 South Korea	Team
Silver medal – second place	1991 China	Team

Kuo Lee Chien-fu (Chinese: 郭李建夫; pinyin: Guō Lǐ Jiànfū; Wade–Giles: Kuo^{1} Li^{3} Chien^{4}-fu^{1}; born March 24, 1969 in Taoyuan County, Taiwan) is a retired Taiwanese professional baseball pitcher and currently a baseball coach. He is best known for being the ace pitcher in the Chinese Taipei national baseball team in the 1992 Olympics where he was twice the winning pitcher in the two games against Japan, one in the preliminary round and the other in the semifinal. The two victories helped the Taiwanese national team win the silver medal that year. He was also a member of the team in the 1988 Olympics when baseball was a demonstration sport, but did not play in any of the tournament's games.

After the 1992 Olympics Kuo Lee joined the Hanshin Tigers. However, during his 6-year career with the Tigers he performed only moderately and was waived by the end of 1998. Right after the waiver Kuo Lee represented Taiwan in the 1998 Asian Games, but allowed 7 runs in within only 2 innings in game against South Korea, as the Chan-ho Park-led South Korean team routed Taiwan. His fame accumulated since 1992 suddenly vanished as Taiwan Major League immediately announced "we do not have any plan to acquire Kuo Lee" right after this fiasco. He later join CPBL's Chinatrust Whales and stayed with the team until his final retirement in late 2003. He currently coaches a college baseball team.

== Career statistics ==
1992 Olympics:

ERA	Games	W	L	IP	HR	Hits Allowed	K	BB	Runs	Earned Runs
0.93	4	3	0	29	0	11	26	13	3	3

Nippon Professional Baseball:

Year	Club	Games	Innings	W	L	Saves	Complete Games	Shutouts	BB	K	Earned Runs	ERA
1993	Hanshin Tigers	27	51.333	5	4	2	0	0	28	48	21	3.68
1994	Hanshin Tigers	49	86	7	5	2	0	0	41	70	30	3.14
1995	Hanshin Tigers	30	115	5	12	0	3	2	68	92	43	3.37
1996	Hanshin Tigers	45	104.333	8	9	15	1	1	51	81	42	3.62
1997	Hanshin Tigers	5	4.667	0	0	0	0	0	4	3	3	5.79
1998	Hanshin Tigers	11	13.667	2	1	0	0	0	13	5	7	4.61
Total		167	375	27	31	19	4	3	205	299	146	3.50

Chinese Professional Baseball League:

Year	Club	W	L	ERA	Games	Complete Games	Shutouts	Saves	Innings	Hits allowed	Runs	Earned Runs	BB	K
1999	Chinatrust Whales	15	7	2.889	23	1	0	0	152.7	125	60	49	62	134
2000	Chinatrust Whales	10	6	2.392	26	1	0	2	131.7	114	52	35	73	107
2001	Chinatrust Whales	0	1	2.362	20	0	0	11	26.7	20	10	7	7	25
2002	Chinatrust Whales	4	5	2.319	34	0	0	16	54.3	41	23	14	23	54
2003	Chinatrust Whales	9	6	3.053	31	0	0	8	94.3	94	44	32	43	95
Total		38	25	2.68	134	2	0	37	459.667	394	189	137	208	415
