= List of CPBL saves champions =

CPBL recognizes save champions in the each season. The champions have been awarded from 1990. If players' holds is equal, the player whose ERA statistic better would be awarded.

== Champions ==
Year	Player	Team	Saves
1990	(United States) Tony Metoyer(湯 尼T.M.)	Uni-President Lions	9
1991	(United States) Tony Metoyer(湯 尼T.M.)	Uni-President Lions	20
1992	(Dominican Republic) Julio Solano(沙勒J.S.)	Mercuries Tigers	14
1993	(Taiwan) Kuo Ching-hsing(郭進興)	Uni-President Lions	18
1994	(Taiwan) Kuo Chien-cheng(郭建成)	China Times Eagles	23
1995	(Taiwan) Kuo Chien-cheng(郭建成)	China Times Eagles	17
1996	(United States) Robert Wishnevski(勞 勃R.W.)	Brother Elephants	26
1997	(United States) Michael Garcia(賈 西M.G.)	Wei Chuan Dragons	20
1998	(United States) Michael Garcia(賈 西M.G.)	Wei Chuan Dragons	26
1999	(United States) Brian Drahman(布萊恩B.D.)	Uni-President Lions	22
2000	(Dominican Republic) Máximo de la Rosa(羅 薩M.R.)	Uni-President Lions	13
2001	(Taiwan) Lin Chao-Huang(林朝煌)	Uni-President Lions	20
2002	(Taiwan) Kuo Lee Chien-Fu(郭李建夫)	Chinatrust Whales	16
2003	(Dominican Republic) Ramón Morel(魔 銳R.M.)	Sinon Bulls	23
2004	(United States) Michael Garcia(凱 撒M.G)	Uni-President Lions	26
2005	(Dominican Republic) Darío Veras(達 威D.V.)	Chinatrust Whales	24
2006	(Taiwan) Kuo Yong-Chih(郭勇志)	Sinon Bulls	13
2007	(United States) Todd Moser(泰 德T.M.)	Brother Elephants	13
2008	(United States) Jermaine Van Buren(飛 鵬J.B.)	La New Bears	20
2009	(Taiwan) Lin Yueh-ping(林岳平)	Uni-President 7-Eleven Lions	26
2010	(United States) Ryan Cullen(庫 倫R.C.)	Brother Elephants	34
2011	(Taiwan) Hsu Ming-chieh(許銘倢)	Lamigo Monkeys	30
2012	(Australia) Brad Thomas(湯瑪仕 B.T.)	Brother Elephants	23
2013	(Australia) Brad Thomas(湯瑪仕 B.T.)	Chinatrust Brothers	26
2014	(Puerto Rico) Miguel Mejía(米吉亞)	Lamigo Monkeys	35
2015	(Taiwan) Chen Hung-Wen(陳鴻文)	CTBC Brothers	24
2016	(Taiwan) Chen Hung-Wen(陳鴻文)	CTBC Brothers	15
2017	(Taiwan) Chen Yu-Hsun(陳禹勳)	Lamigo Monkeys	37
2018	(Taiwan) Chen Yu-Hsun(陳禹勳)	Lamigo Monkeys	30
2019	(Taiwan) Chen Yun-Wen (陳韻文)	Uni-President 7-Eleven Lions	24
2020	(Taiwan) Chen Yun-Wen (陳韻文)	Uni-President 7-Eleven Lions	23
2021	(Taiwan) Chen Yun-Wen (陳韻文)	Uni-President 7-Eleven Lions	32
2022	(United States) Bradin Hagens (豪 勁B.H.)	Rakuten Monkeys	36
2023	(Taiwan) Lu Yen-Ching (呂彥青)	CTBC Brothers	22
2024	(Taiwan) Chen Bo-Hao (陳柏豪)	Rakuten Monkeys	29
2025	(Taiwan) Lin Shi-Xiang (林詩翔)	TSG Hawks	30
2026	(Taiwan) Chung Yun-Hua(鍾允華)	Uni-President 7-Eleven Lions	33
