= Lee Lai-fa =

Taiwanese baseball player and manager (1956–2024)

- Lee in 1992
- Outfielder / Manager
- Born: 28 June 1956; Chiayi County, Taiwan
- Died: 16 October 2024 (aged 68)
- Batted: Right Threw: Right

Teams
- As player: Nankai Hawks (1980–1983); As manager: Chinatrust Whales (1997–2001; 2004–2008)
Medals
Manager for Chinese Taipei
Men's Baseball
Olympic Games
Silver medal – second place	1992 Barcelona	Team

Lee Lai-fa (Chinese: 李來發; pinyin: Lǐ Lái Fā; 28 June 1956 – 16 October 2024) was a Taiwanese baseball outfielder and manager who led the Chinese Taipei national team to win the silver medal in the 1992 Summer Olympics in Barcelona.

== Playing career ==
As an amateur baseball player, Lee represented Taiwan in the 1974 Amateur World Series, 1975 Asian Baseball Championship, 1976 Amateur World Series and 1977 Intercontinental Cup. Since there was no professional baseball league in Taiwan at the time, he moved to Japan in 1980 and joined the Nankai Hawks of Nippon Professional Baseball (NPB).

He made his debut with Nankai's first team in 1982, playing ten games during that season. In 1983 he appeared in 15 games. In the two seasons he spent with Nankai's first team he appeared in 25 games, recording 16 hits, two doubles and three home runs in 83 at bats.

== Managing career ==
Lee worked as a coach for the Chinese Taipei national team since the demonstration tournament at the 1984 Summer Olympics. In 1989 he was appointed manager of Chinese Taipei for the 1989 Intercontinental Cup.

He led Chinese Taipei to win the silver medal in the 1992 Summer Olympics held in Barcelona, the first time that baseball was an Olympic medal sport. Chinese Taipei finished the opening round in third place with a 5–2 record. In the knockout stage, the team defeated Japan 5–2 in the semifinals, but lost against Cuba in the final, 1–11.

Lee managed the Chinatrust Whales of the Chinese Professional Baseball League (CPBL) from 1997 to 2001 and in 2006. During his six seasons as manager of the whales, he managed 571 games with a record of 281 wins, 274 losses and 16 ties. He also managed Team Red in the 2004 CPBL All-Star Game.

After retiring from professional baseball in 2009, Lee became manager of the Kao-Yuan Vocational High School of Technology and Commerce baseball team.

== Death ==
Lee died on 16 October 2024 of liver cancer, aged 68.
