= Lin Chao-huang =

Taiwanese baseball player

- Pitcher
- Born: 17 August 1969 (age 56); Taipei, Taiwan
- Batted: Right Threw: Right

CPBL debut
- March 12, 1993, for the Jungo Bears

Last appearance
- July 15, 2005, for the Chinatrust Whales

CPBL statistics
- Win–loss record: 49–73
- Earned run average: 4.11
- Strikeouts: 721
- Stats at Baseball Reference

Teams
- Jungo Bears/Sinon Bulls (1993–1997); Uni-President Lions (1997–2002); Chinatrust Whales (2003–2005)

Career highlights and awards
- 5x CPBL All-Star (1994–1996, 2001–2002); Taiwan Series Champions (2000); CPBL saves leader (2001)
Medals
Representing Chinese Taipei
Men's baseball
Olympic Games
Silver medal – second place	1992 Barcelona	Team
Asian Championship
Gold medal – first place	1989 South Korea	Team

Lin Chao-Huang (Chinese: 林朝煌; pinyin: Lín Zhāohuáng; born August 17, 1969) is a Taiwanese baseball player who competed in the 1992 Summer Olympics.

He was part of the Chinese Taipei baseball team which won the silver medal. He is a right-handed pitcher.
