= Antonio Salazar (baseball) =

Spanish baseball player (born 1965)

- Outfielder
- Born: 15 October 1965 (age 59); Madrid, Spain
Medals
Men's baseball
Representing Spain
European Baseball Championship
Bronze medal – third place	1987 Spain	National team
Bronze medal – third place	1989 France	National team

Antonio Salazar Calzado (born 15 October 1965) is a Spanish former baseball center fielder. He played with Spain at the 1992 Summer Olympics held in Barcelona. He played six games and had 6 hits in 19 at-bats.

After retiring, he coached for the Spanish national team at the 2005 and 2007 editions of the Baseball World Cup. In 2021 he was appointed to the Board of Directors of the Royal Spanish Baseball and Softball Federation.
