= Antonio Scull =

Cuban baseball player

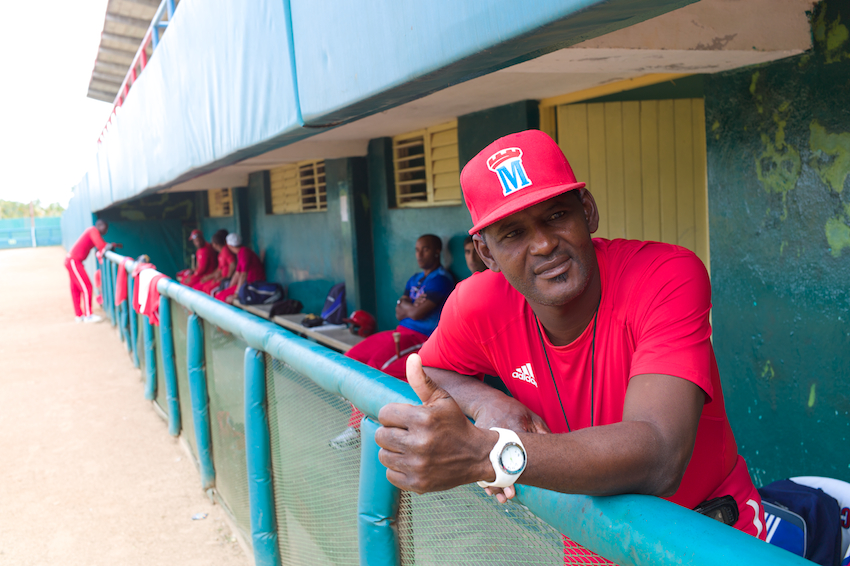

Medal record

Men's baseball

Representing Cuba

Summer Olympics
Gold medal – first place	1996 Atlanta	Team
Silver medal – second place	2000 Sydney	Team
Gold medal – first place	2004 Athens	Team

Baseball World Cup
Gold medal – first place	2001 Taipei	Team

Antonio Scull Hernández (born September 10, 1965 in Havana) is a first baseman with Industriales of the Cuban National Series and a longtime member of the Cuban national baseball team. Representing Cuba, Scull won gold medals at the 1996 and 2004 Summer Olympics and won a silver medal in 2000.

During the 2005–06 Cuban National Series, at age 40, Scull hit .299 for Industriales, playing in 67 of the team's 90 games.
