= Juan Carlos Pérez (pitcher) =

Cuban baseball player (born 1969)

- Pitcher
- Born: 17 May 1969 (age 57); Puerto Padre, Las Tunas Province, Cuba
- Bats: Right Throws: Right

Teams
- Las Tunas (1987–1997)
Medals
Men's baseball
Representing Cuba
Olympic Games
Gold medal – first place	1992 Barcelona	Team

Juan Carlos Pérez Rondón (born 17 May 1969) is a Cuban former baseball pitcher. He represented Cuba at the 1992 Summer Olympics, where the team won the gold medal.

== Career ==
Pérez was born on 17 May 1969 in Puerto Padre, Las Tunas Province. He practiced handball before switching to baseball. He made his debut in the Cuban National Series in 1987 with Las Tunas and he soon became one of the top pitchers in Cuban baseball.

In 1992, Pérez was selected to represent Cuba at the 1992 Summer Olympics in Barcelona, where he made three appearances. He opened Cuba's second game against Italy, pitching 5.0 innings and was awarded the win, 18–1. He also played as a reliever in the victories against Puerto Rico and Chinese Taipei, allowing no runs. The Cuban team went undefeated and won the gold medal.

After returning from the Olympics, Pérez injured his elbow while playing volleyball. He underwent surgery but was never able to fully recover his previous level of performance. He returned to play in 1994 and eventually retired after the 1996–97 Cuban National Series.
