= Kazumi Nakamura =

Japanese volleyball player

Personal information
- Nationality: Japanese
- Born: 24 February 1971 (age 55); Hodatsushimizu, Ishikawa, Japan
- Height: 1.70 m (5 ft 7 in)

Volleyball information
- Position: Outside hitter
- Number: 12 (1992); 9 (1996)

National team
1991–1996	Japan

Kazumi Nakamura (Japanese: 中村 和美; born 24 February 1971) is a Japanese former volleyball player who competed in the 1992 Summer Olympics and in the 1996 Summer Olympics.

In 1992, Nakamura finished fifth with the Japanese team in the Olympic tournament in Barcelona.

Nakamura was a member of the Japanese team that was eliminated in the preliminary round of the 1996 Olympic tournament in Atlanta.
