= Michiyo Ishikake =

Japanese volleyball player (born 1966)

Personal information
- Born: 17 March 1966 (age 60); Himeji, Hyogo, Japan
- Height: 177 cm (5 ft 10 in)

Volleyball information
- Position: Middle blocker
- Number: 3

National team
1991–1992	Japan

Michiyo Ishikake (Japanese: 石掛 美知代; born 17 March 1966) is a Japanese former volleyball player who competed in the 1992 Summer Olympics in Barcelona.

In 1992, Ishikake finished fifth with the Japanese team in the Olympic tournament.
