= Masashi Kato =

Japanese swimmer (born 1970)

Personal information
- Born: August 14, 1970 (age 55) Osaka Prefecture, Japan

Sport
- Sport: Swimming
Medal record
Representing Japan
Asian Games
Bronze medal – third place	1990 Beijing	1500m freestyle

Masashi Kato (加藤 真志, Katō Masashi) (born August 14, 1970) is a retired Japanese male freestyle swimmer. He represented Japan in two consecutive Summer Olympics, starting in 1988. His best Olympic result was the 16th place (15:40.94) in the Men's 1500 metres Freestyle event at the 1992 Summer Olympics in Barcelona, Spain.
