= Katsumi Kawano =

Japanese volleyball player (born 1965)

Personal information
- Born: 28 July 1965 (age 61); Oita Prefecture, Japan
- Height: 1.88 m (6 ft 2 in)

Volleyball information
- Position: Outside hitter
- Number: 2

National team
1992-1995	Japan

Katsumi Kawano (born 28 July 1965) is a Japanese former volleyball player who competed in the 1992 Summer Olympics.
