= José Estrada González =

Cuban baseball player (born 1967)

José Estrada
- Outfielder
- Born: 22 January 1967 (age 59); Jovellanos, Matanzas Province, Cuba
- Bats: Right Throws: Right
Medals
Men's baseball
Representing Cuba
Olympic Games
Gold medal – first place	1992 Barcelona	Team
Gold medal – first place	1996 Atlanta	Team
Pan American Games
Gold medal – first place	1995 Mar del Plata	Team
Central American and Caribbean Games
Gold medal – first place	1993 Ponce	Team

José Antonio Estrada González (born 22 January 1967) is a Cuban former professional baseball outfielder and Olympic gold medalist.

== Career ==
González played 13 seasons in the Cuban National Series from 1991 to 2004 for Matanzas. He is a two time gold medalist for baseball, winning at the 1992 Summer Olympics and the 1996 Summer Olympics.

== Personal life ==
Estrada's nephew, Lázaro Estrada, plays in Major League Baseball for the Toronto Blue Jays.
