= Yoko Koikawa =

Japanese swimmer (born 1974)

Personal information
- Full name: Yoko Koikawa
- Nationality: Japan
- Born: May 18, 1974 (age 52) Fukuoka, Japan
- Height: 1.69 m (5 ft 7 in)
- Weight: 61 kg (134 lb)

Sport
- Sport: Swimming
- Strokes: Freestyle, Backstroke
Medal record
Women's swimming
Representing Japan
Pan Pacific Championships
Silver medal – second place	1991 Edmonton	4x100 m freestyle
Silver medal – second place	1991 Edmonton	4x200 m freestyle
Bronze medal – third place	1993 Kobe	100 m backstroke
Bronze medal – third place	1993 Kobe	4x200 m free
Bronze medal – third place	1993 Kobe	4x100 m medley
Summer Universiade
Gold medal – first place	1995 Fukuoka	200m Backstroke
Silver medal – second place	1993 Buffalo	100m Backstroke
Bronze medal – third place	1993 Buffalo	200m Backstroke

Yoko Koikawa (肥川 葉子, Koikawa Yōko) (born May 18, 1974, in Fukuoka, Japan) is a retired Japanese backstroke swimmer, who represented her native country at the 1992 Summer Olympics in Barcelona, Spain. She is best known for winning the gold medal in the Women's 200m Backstroke event at the 1995 Summer Universiade in her hometown Fukuoka.
