= Tsai Ming-hung =

Taiwanese baseball player (born 1966)

- Pitcher
- Born: 2 September 1966 (age 59); Yunlin County, Taiwan
- Batted: Right Threw: Right

CPBL debut
- March 28, 1993, for the China Times Eagles

Last appearance
- September 29, 1995, for the China Times Eagles

CPBL statistics
- Win–loss record: 3–7
- Earned run average: 6.45
- Strikeouts: 34
- Stats at Baseball Reference

Teams
- As player: China Times Eagles (1993–1996); As coach: China Times Eagles (1997)
Medals
Representing Chinese Taipei
Men's baseball
Olympic Games
Silver medal – second place	1992 Barcelona	Team

Tsai Ming-Hung (Chinese: 蔡明宏; pinyin: Cài Mínghóng; born 2 September 1966) is a retired Taiwanese professional baseball player who competed in the 1992 Summer Olympics. He was part of the Chinese Taipei baseball team which won the silver medal. He is a right-handed submarine pitcher.

After the Barcelona Olympics Tsai joined China Times Eagles of the Chinese Professional Baseball League(CPBL). He left an unsatisfactory 3-win, 7-loss record during his three 1993~1995 seasons and was waived after the 1995 CPBL season. He currently runs small business in his home town Yunlin County.
