= Chen Wei-chen =

Taiwanese baseball player

- Outfielder
- Born: May 24, 1966 (age 59); Chiayi County, Taiwan
- Batted: Right Threw: Right

CPBL debut
- March 12, 1993, for the Jungo Bears

Last appearance
- October 6, 1997, for the Sinon Bulls

CPBL statistics
- Batting average: .271
- Home runs: 7
- Runs batted in: 105
- Stats at Baseball Reference

Teams
- As player: Jungo Bears/Sinon Bulls (1993–1997); As manager: Sinon Bulls (2001–2004); As coach: Sinon Bulls (1998–2001)
Medals
Representing Chinese Taipei
Men's baseball
Olympic Games
Silver medal – second place	1992 Barcelona	Team

Chen Wei-Chen (Chinese: 陳威成; pinyin: Chén Wēichéng; born 24 May 1966) is a Taiwanese baseball player who competed in the 1992 Summer Olympics.

He was part of the Chinese Taipei baseball team which won the silver medal. He played as outfielder. Known for resurgence later in career, nicknamed after legendary philosopher Laozi (老子)
