= Masafumi Nishi =

Japanese baseball player (born 1960)

Medal record

Men's baseball

Representing Japan

Olympic Games
Silver medal – second place	1988 Seoul	Team
Bronze medal – third place	1992 Barcelona	Team

Asian Baseball Championship
Gold medal – first place	1989 Seoul	Team
Gold medal – first place	1993 Perth	Team

Intercontinental Cup
Bronze medal – third place	1985 Edmonton	Team
Bronze medal – third place	1987 Havana	Team
Silver medal – second place	1989 San Juan	Team
Silver medal – second place	1991 Barcelona	Team

Masafumi Nishi (西 正文, Nishi Masafumi; born November 25, 1960 in Hyogo Prefecture, Japan) is a Japanese baseball player. He won a bronze medal at the 1992 Summer Olympics.
