= Alberto Hernández (catcher) =

Cuban baseball player

Medal record

Men's baseball

Representing Cuba

Olympic Games
Gold medal – first place	1992 Barcelona	Team
Gold medal – first place	1996 Atlanta	Team

Baseball World Cup
Gold medal – first place	1990 Edmonton	Team
Gold medal – first place	1994 Managua	Team

Intercontinental Cup
Gold medal – first place	1995 Havana	Team

Pan American Games
Gold medal – first place	1991 Havana	Team

Central American and Caribbean Games
Gold medal – first place	1993 Ponce	Team

Goodwill Games
Gold medal – first place	1990 Seattle	Team

José Alberto Hernández Pérez (born February 9, 1969) is a Cuban baseball player and Olympic gold medalist. He was born in Holguín, Cuba. Hernández is a two time Gold medalist for baseball, winning at the 1992 Summer Olympics and the 1996 Summer Olympics.
