= Lo Chen-jung =

Taiwanese baseball player

Olympic medal record

Men's Baseball
Silver medal – second place	1992 Barcelona	Team

Lo Chen-Jung (Chinese: 羅振榮; pinyin: Luó Zhènróng; born 30 November 1961 in Chiayi, Taiwan) is a retired Taiwanese left-handed baseball pitcher. He had been a member of the amateur Taiwan Power Company Baseball Team throughout his career. He was widely regarded as the best left-handed Taiwanese pitcher of his generation and was a frequent member of the Chinese Taipei national baseball team between mid-1980s and early 1990s, competing in the 1988 and 1992 Summer Olympics where he won a silver medal in 1992.

Despite hearty invitation from the Jungo Bears and Uni-President Lions, after the 1992 Olympics Lo opted to retire from baseball field and became the only member in the 1992 Olympics Chinese Taipei national baseball team who did not later join professional baseball. He has since run some business in his hometown Chiayi, and occasionally coaches local Little or Youth League baseball teams.
