= Huang Wen-po =

Taiwanese baseball player

- Pitcher
- Born: October 29, 1971 (age 53); Annan, Tainan, Taiwan
- Batted: Right Threw: Right

CPBL debut
- March 16, 1995, for the Wei Chuan Dragons

Last appearance
- May 15, 1999, for the Koos Group Whales

CPBL statistics
- Win–loss record: 33–43
- Earned run average: 4.03
- Strikeouts: 406

Teams
- As player: Wei Chuan Dragons (1995–1997); Koos Group Whales (1998–1999); As coach: Shanghai Golden Eagles (2004, 2017–2019)

Career highlights and awards
- 3x CPBL All-Star (1995, 1997–1998); CPBL Most Improved Player (1996); Taiwan Series Outstanding Player (1996); Taiwan Series Champions (1997); Taiwan Series MVP (1997)
Medals
Representing Chinese Taipei
Men's baseball
Olympic Games
Silver medal – second place	1992 Barcelona	Team

Huang Wen-Po (simplified Chinese: 黄文博; traditional Chinese: 黃文博; pinyin: Huáng Wénbó; born October 29, 1971) is a Taiwanese baseball player who competed in the 1992 Summer Olympics.

He was part of the Chinese Taipei baseball team which won the silver medal. He is a right-handed pitcher.
