= Baseball at the 1992 Summer Olympics =

Baseball at the Games of the XXV Olympiad
- Venues: Estadi Municipal de Beisbol de L'Hospitalet (L'Hospitalet de Llobregat); Camp Municipal de Beisbol de Viladecans (Viladecans)
- Dates: July 26 – August 5, 1992
- Competitors: 160 from 8 nations
- Teams: 8

Medalists
1st place, gold medalist(s)		Cuba
2nd place, silver medalist(s)		Chinese Taipei
3rd place, bronze medalist(s)		Japan

Baseball at the 1992 Summer Olympics marked the debut of baseball as an official medal sport at the Olympics. The games were contested in Barcelona as part of the 1992 Summer Olympics. Baseball was an event open only to amateurs, although Cuba used its best players as they were amateurs in name only with all necessary funding coming from the state. The maximum roster size was 20 players per team.

Eight nations competed, with the preliminary phase consisting of each team playing every other team. Playoffs were then held, with the four highest ranked teams advancing. For the semifinals, the first place team played the fourth place team, and the second place team played against the third place team. The winners of those semifinals competed against each other for the gold medal, with the loser getting the silver medal. The teams defeated in the semifinals played a match for the bronze medal. Cuba won gold, with Chinese Taipei (Taiwan) winning silver, and Japan winning bronze.

== Venues ==
(Spain) L'Hospitalet de Llobregat	(Spain) Viladecans
Estadi Municipal de Beisbol de L'Hospitalet	Camp Municipal de Beisbol de Viladecans
Capacity: 7,000	Capacity: 4,000

== Medalists ==
Gold	Silver	Bronze
Cuba; Omar Ajete; Rolando Arrojo; Giorge Díaz; José Raúl Delgado; José Estrada; Osvaldo Fernández; Lourdes Gourriel; Alberto Hernández; Orlando Hernández; Orestes Kindelán; Omar Linares; Germán Mesa; Víctor Mesa; Antonio Pacheco; Juan Padilla; Juan Carlos Pérez; Luis Ulacia; Ermidelio Urrutia; Jorge Luis Valdés; Lázaro Vargas Manager: Jorge Fuentes	Chinese Taipei; Chang Cheng-hsien; Chang Wen-tsung; Chang Yao-teng; Chen Chi-hsin; Chen Wei-chen; Chiang Tai-chuan; Chung Yu-cheng; Huang Chung-yi; Huang Wen-po; Ku Kuo-chian; Kuo Lee Chien-fu; Liao Ming-hsiung; Lin Chao-huang; Lin Kun-han; Lo Chen-jung; Lo Kuo-chong; Pai Kun-hong; Tsai Ming-hung; Wang Kuang-shih; Wu Shih-hsih Manager: Lee Lai-fa	Japan; Tomohito Ito; Shinichiro Kawabata; Masahito Kohiyama; Hirotami Kojima; Hiroki Kokubo; Takashi Miwa; Hiroshi Nakamoto; Masafumi Nishi; Kazutaka Nishiyama; Koichi Oshima; Hiroyuki Sakaguchi; Shinichi Sato; Yasuhiro Sato; Masanori Sugiura; Kento Sugiyama; Yasunori Takami; Akihiro Togo; Koji Tokunaga; Shigeki Wakabayashi; Katsumi Watanabe Manager: Masatake Yamanaka

== Teams ==
- Spain (Hosts)
- Chinese Taipei (1991 Asian Baseball Championship silver medalist)
- Japan (1991 Asian Baseball Championship gold medalist)
- Italy (1991 European Baseball Championship gold medalist)
- Cuba (1991 Pan American games gold medalist)
- Puerto Rico (1991 Pan American games silver medalist)
- United States (1991 Pan American games bronze medalist)
- Dominican Republic (1991 Pan American games fourth place)

== Preliminary round ==
Pos	Team	Pld	W	L	RF	RA	RD	PCT	GB	Qualification
1	Cuba	7	7	0	78	14	+64	1.000	—	Advance to knockout round
2	Japan	7	5	2	60	15	+45	.714	2	Advance to knockout round
3	Chinese Taipei	7	5	2	61	21	+40	.714	2	Advance to knockout round
4	United States	7	5	2	49	28	+21	.714	2	Advance to knockout round
5	Puerto Rico	7	2	5	22	48	−26	.286	5	
6	Dominican Republic	7	2	5	23	60	−37	.286	5	
7	Italy	7	1	6	25	62	−37	.143	6	
8	Spain (H)	7	1	6	15	85	−70	.143	6	

Source: WBSC
(H) Hosts

=== Round 1 ===
Team	1	2	3	4	5	6	7	8	9	R	H	E
Italy	0	0	0	0	0	0	0	2	0	2	8	0
Chinese Taipei	1	0	5	0	2	0	0	0	x	8	12	0

Team	1	2	3	4	5	6	7	8	9	R	H	E
Dominican Republic	0	0	0	0	0	0	0	0	0	0	3	0
Cuba	0	0	0	4	0	2	0	2	x	8	14	0

Team	1	2	3	4	5	6	7	8	9	R	H	E
United States	1	0	2	1	0	0	0	0	0	4	5	0
Spain	0	0	0	1	0	0	0	0	0	1	3	2

Team	1	2	3	4	5	6	7	8	9	R	H	E
Japan	1	0	3	0	2	0	0	3	0	9	11	1
Puerto Rico	0	0	0	0	0	0	0	0	0	0	5	1

=== Round 2 ===
Team	1	2	3	4	5	6	7	8	9	R	H	E
United States	0	3	0	0	3	1	3	0	0	10	14	1
Chinese Taipei	0	0	0	4	0	1	4	0	0	9	9	1

Team	1	2	3	4	5	6	7	8	9	R	H	E
Dominican Republic	0	0	0	0	0	0	4	0	1	5	8	4
Puerto Rico	2	1	0	0	4	0	0	0	x	7	10	1

Team	1	2	3	4	5	6	7	8	9	R	H	E
Spain	0	0	0	0	0	0	1			1	3	1
Japan	2	4	0	2	0	4	x			12	11	0

Team	1	2	3	4	5	6	7	8	9	R	H	E
Cuba	5	0	3	0	0	0	2	8		18	20	0
Italy	1	0	0	0	0	0	0	0		1	8	2

=== Round 3 ===
Team	1	2	3	4	5	6	7	8	9	R	H	E
Puerto Rico	0	0	0	1	0	0	0	0	0	1	3	1
Chinese Taipei	0	0	0	5	2	2	1	0	x	10	13	0

Team	1	2	3	4	5	6	7	8	9	R	H	E
Italy	0	0	0	0	0	0	0	0		0	5	4
United States	1	0	1	0	1	1	1	5		10	15	1

Team	1	2	3	4	5	6	7	8	9	R	H	E
Cuba	0	0	4	0	0	2	2	0	0	8	15	1
Japan	0	0	0	1	0	1	0	0	0	2	5	1

Team	1	2	3	4	5	6	7	8	9	R	H	E
Spain	0	0	0	1	0	1	0	0	0	2	4	4
Dominican Republic	0	4	1	0	1	3	0	2	x	11	13	3

=== Round 4 ===
Team	1	2	3	4	5	6	7	8	9	R	H	E
Japan	1	1	4	1	1	5	4			17	18	0
Dominican Republic	0	0	0	0	0	0	0			0	3	2

Team	1	2	3	4	5	6	7	8	9	R	H	E
Italy	0	0	0	0	0	0	0	0	0	0	4	0
Puerto Rico	1	0	0	1	0	0	0	0	x	2	7	0

Team	1	2	3	4	5	6	7	8	9	R	H	E
United States	5	0	0	0	0	0	1	0	0	6	9	5
Cuba	0	0	4	2	0	3	0	0	x	9	13	4

Team	1	2	3	4	5	6	7	8	9	R	H	E
Spain	0	0	0	0	0	0	0			0	2	0
Chinese Taipei	7	3	4	6	0	0	x			20	19	1

=== Round 5 ===
Team	1	2	3	4	5	6	7	8	9	R	H	E
Italy	0	0	0	0	1	2	0	0		3	6	0
Japan	4	0	1	5	0	2	0	1		13	11	0

Team	1	2	3	4	5	6	7	8	9	R	H	E
Chinese Taipei	4	0	0	1	1	3	2			11	13	0
Dominican Republic	0	0	0	0	0	0	0			0	6	0

Team	1	2	3	4	5	6	7	8	9	R	H	E
Cuba	0	6	0	6	0	6	0			18	16	1
Spain	0	0	0	0	0	0	0			0	2	5

Team	1	2	3	4	5	6	7	8	9	R	H	E
Puerto Rico	0	1	0	0	1	0	0	0	0	2	15	3
United States	3	0	3	0	0	0	1	1	x	8	9	1

=== Round 6 ===
Team	1	2	3	4	5	6	7	8	9	R	H	E
Puerto Rico	0	0	0	1	0	2	1	0	0	4	10	3
Cuba	4	0	1	2	1	0	0	1	x	9	15	2

Team	1	2	3	4	5	6	7	8	9	R	H	E
Chinese Taipei	0	0	0	0	0	0	1	0	1	2	7	1
Japan	0	0	0	0	0	0	0	0	0	0	3	0

Team	1	2	3	4	5	6	7	8	9	R	H	E
Spain	0	0	3	1	0	0	0			4	8	3
Italy	1	2	2	2	5	1	1			14	14	0

Team	1	2	3	4	5	6	7	8	9	R	H	E
Dominican Republic	0	0	0	0	0	0	0			0	2	3
United States	0	3	0	1	4	1	1			10	11	1

=== Round 7 ===
Team	1	2	3	4	5	6	7	8	9	10	R	H	E
Dominican Republic	0	0	0	1	2	0	0	0	2	2	7	13	4
Italy	1	0	2	0	0	0	0	0	2	0	5	10	2

Team	1	2	3	4	5	6	7	8	9	R	H	E
Puerto Rico	0	0	0	1	0	1	0	1	3	6	12	3
Spain	0	0	0	0	0	4	0	0	3	7	10	1

Team	1	2	3	4	5	6	7	8	9	R	H	E
Japan	0	1	0	0	0	4	1	0	1	7	14	0
United States	0	0	0	1	0	0	0	0	0	1	7	0

Team	1	2	3	4	5	6	7	8	9	R	H	E
Chinese Taipei	0	0	0	0	0	0	1	0	0	1	6	1
Cuba	0	3	0	0	3	0	2	0	x	8	13	2

== Knockout round ==
Semi-finals
Cuba	6
United States	1
Chinese Taipei	5
Japan	2

Final
Cuba	11
Chinese Taipei	1
Third place
United States	3
Japan	8

=== Semifinals ===
Team	1	2	3	4	5	6	7	8	9	R	H	E
Chinese Taipei	1	0	0	1	1	1	0	1	0	5	9	0
Japan	0	1	1	0	0	0	0	0	0	2	5	0

Team	1	2	3	4	5	6	7	8	9	R	H	E
United States	0	0	0	0	0	1	0	0	0	1	7	1
Cuba	0	0	0	1	1	2	0	2	x	6	11	1

=== Bronze medal match ===
Team	1	2	3	4	5	6	7	8	9	R	H	E
Japan	0	4	0	0	0	4	0	0	0	8	14	1
United States	0	0	0	2	1	0	0	0	0	3	6	2

=== Final ===
Team	1	2	3	4	5	6	7	8	9	R	H	E
Cuba	2	0	2	1	0	1	2	1	2	11	18	2
Chinese Taipei	0	0	0	0	0	0	1	0	0	1	4	3

== Final standing ==
Place	Team
Gold	Cuba
Silver	Chinese Taipei
Bronze	Japan
4.	United States
5.	Puerto Rico
6.	Dominican Republic
7.	Italy
8.	Spain

1992 Olympic champions

Cuba
First title

== Statistical leaders ==
=== Batting ===
Statistic	Name	Total/Avg
Batting average*	(Cuba) Víctor Mesa	.556
Hits	(Cuba) Omar Linares	13
Runs	(Cuba) Omar Linares	11
Runs	(Cuba) Ermidelio Urrutia	11
Doubles	(Cuba) Ermidelio Urrutia	5
Triples	17 tied with	1
Home runs	4 tied with	3
Runs batted in	(Chinese Taipei) Wang Kuang-shih	12
Walks	(Italy) Roberto Bianchi	9
Stolen bases	(United States) Calvin Murray	9
On-base percentage*	(Cuba) Víctor Mesa	.636
Slugging percentage*	(Cuba) Víctor Mesa	1.000
Slugging percentage*	(Chinese Taipei) Chang Wen-tsung	1.000
OPS*	(Cuba) Víctor Mesa	1.636

* Minimum 2.7 plate appearances per team game

=== Pitching ===
Statistic	Name	Total/Avg
Wins	4 tied with	2
Saves	4 tied with	1
Innings pitched	(Chinese Taipei) Kuo Lee Chien-fu	20
Earned run average*	6 tied with	0.00
Strikeouts	(Japan) Tomohito Ito	20
Walks allowed*	(Cuba) Giorge Díaz	0
Walks allowed*	(Japan) Katsumi Watanabe	0
BAA*	(Chinese Taipei) Kuo Lee Chien-fu	.095

* Minimum 0.8 innings pitched per team game

== Schedule ==
Baseball events took place over 11 days, from July 26 to August 5.

1. July 26
  - ITA - TPE (10:30, L'Hospitalet)
  - DOM - CUB (10:30, Viladecans)
  - USA - ESP (18:00, L'Hospitalet)
  - JPN - PUR (18:00, Viladecans)
2. July 27
  - USA - TPE (15:00, L'Hospitalet)
  - CUB - ITA (15:00, Viladecans)
  - DOM - PUR (21:00, L'Hospitalet)
  - ESP - JPN (21:00, Viladecans)
3. July 28
  - PUR - TPE (15:00, L'Hospitalet)
  - ITA - USA (15:00, Viladecans)
  - CUB - JPN (21:00, L'Hospitalet)
  - ESP - DOM (21:00, Viladecans)
4. July 29
  - JPN - DOM (15:00, L'Hospitalet)
  - ITA - PUR (15:00, Viladecans)
  - USA - CUB (21:00, L'Hospitalet)
  - ESP - TPE (21:00, Viladecans)
5. July 31
  - ITA - JPN (15:00, L'Hospitalet)
  - TPE - DOM (15:00, Viladecans)
  - CUB - ESP (21:00, L'Hospitalet)
  - PUR - USA (21:00, Viladecans)
6. August 1
  - PUR - CUB (15:00, L'Hospitalet)
  - TPE - JPN (15:00, Viladecans)
  - ESP - ITA (21:00, L'Hospitalet)
  - DOM - USA (21:00, Viladecans)
7. August 2
  - DOM - ITA (15:00, L'Hospitalet)
  - PUR - ESP (15:00, Viladecans)
  - JPN - USA (21:00, L'Hospitalet)
  - TPE - CUB (21:00, Viladecans)
8. August 4
  - TPE - JPN (15:00, L'Hospitalet)
  - USA - CUB (21:00, L'Hospitalet)
9. August 5
  - JPN - USA (15:00, L'Hospitalet)
  - CUB - TPE (21:00, L'Hospitalet)
