= Chen Chih-hsin =

Taiwanese baseball player

- Catcher
- Born: May 16, 1962 (age 63); Fuli, Hualien County, Taiwan
- Batted: Right Threw: Right

CPBL debut
- March 12, 1993, for the China Times Eagles

Last appearance
- June 15, 1997, for the China Times Eagles

CPBL statistics
- Batting average: .256
- Home runs: 24
- Runs batted in: 133
- Stats at Baseball Reference

Teams
- China Times Eagles (1993–1997)

Career highlights and awards
- 3× CPBL All-Star (1993–1995)
Medals
Representing Chinese Taipei
Men's baseball
Olympic Games
Silver medal – second place	1992 Barcelona	Team

Chen Chih-hsin (simplified Chinese: 陈执信; traditional Chinese: 陳執信; pinyin: Chén Zhíxìn; born May 16, 1962) is a Taiwanese baseball player who competed in the 1992 Summer Olympics.

He was part of the Chinese Taipei baseball team which won the silver medal. He played as catcher.
