= Pai Kun-hong =

Taiwanese baseball player

- Catcher
- Born: 6 January 1970 (age 56); Taipei, Taiwan
- Batted: Right Threw: Right

CPBL debut
- March 12, 1993, for the Jungo Bears

Last appearance
- October 4, 1997, for the China Times Eagles

CPBL statistics
- Batting average: .230
- Home runs: 16
- Runs batted in: 126
- Stats at Baseball Reference

Teams
- Jungo Bears/Sinon Bulls (1993–1997); China Times Eagles (1997)

Career highlights and awards
- 4x CPBL All-Star (1994–1997)
Medals
Representing Chinese Taipei
Men's baseball
Olympic Games
Silver medal – second place	1992 Barcelona	Team

Pai Kun-hong (Chinese: 白昆弘; pinyin: Bái Kūnhóng; born 6 January 1970) is a Taiwanese baseball player who competed in the 1992 Summer Olympics.

He was part of the Chinese Taipei baseball team which won the silver medal. He played as catcher.
