= Ku Kuo-chian =

Taiwanese baseball player

- Infielder
- Born: November 10, 1968 (age 57); Pingtung County, Taiwan
- Batted: Right Threw: Right

CPBL debut
- March 12, 1993, for the China Times Eagles

Last appearance
- October 20, 1996, for the China Times Eagles

CPBL statistics
- Batting average: .258
- Home runs: 4
- Runs batted in: 80
- Stats at Baseball Reference

Teams
- China Times Eagles (1993–1996)

Career highlights and awards
- 2× CPBL All-Star (1993, 1996)
Medals
Representing Chinese Taipei
Men's baseball
Olympic Games
| Silver medal – second place | 1992 Barcelona | Team |
World Junior Baseball Championship
| Silver medal – second place | 1986 Windsor | Team |

Ku Kuo-chian (Chinese: 古國謙; pinyin: Gǔ Guóqiān; born 10 November 1968), previously known as Ku Sheng-chi, is a Taiwanese baseball player who competed in the 1992 Summer Olympics.

He was part of the Chinese Taipei baseball team which won the silver medal. He played as infielder.
