= Chang Yao-teng =

Taiwanese baseball player

- Shortstop
- Born: March 28, 1965 (age 60); Tainan County, Taiwan
- Batted: Right Threw: Right

CPBL debut
- March 12, 1993, for the Jungo Bears

Last appearance
- September 30, 1997, for the China Times Eagles

CPBL statistics
- Batting average: .244
- Home runs: 10
- Runs batted in: 111

Teams
- Jungo Bears/Sinon Bulls (1993–1996); China Times Eagles (1997)

Career highlights and awards
- 5× CPBL All-Star (1993–1997); CPBL Golden Glove Award (1995); CPBL stolen bases leader (1995); CPBL Best Nine Award (1995)
Medals
Representing Chinese Taipei
Men's baseball
Olympic Games
Silver medal – second place	1992 Barcelona	Team

Chang Yao-teng (Chinese: 張耀騰; pinyin: Zhāng Yàoténg; born 28 March 1965) is a Taiwanese baseball player who competed in the 1992 Summer Olympics.

He was part of the Chinese Taipei baseball team which won the silver medal. He played as infielder.
