= Masanori Sugiura =

Japanese baseball player

Medal record

Representing Japan

Men's baseball

Summer Olympics
Bronze medal – third place	Barcelona 1992	Team
Silver medal – second place	Atlanta 1996	Team

Asian Baseball Championship
Gold medal – first place	Beijing 1991	Team
Gold medal – first place	Kurashiki 1995	Team

Baseball World Cup
Bronze medal – third place	Managua 1994	Team

Intercontinental Cup
Bronze medal – third place	Italy 1993	Team
Silver medal – second place	Havana 1995	Team
Gold medal – first place	Barcelona 1997	Team
Bronze medal – third place	Sydney 1999	Team

Masanori Sugiura (杉浦 正則, born May 23, 1968) is a retired Japanese Olympic baseball player from Kudoyama, Wakayama, Japan.

Sugiura was the ace pitcher of the Nippon Life Insurance Company baseball team, and was chosen to join the Japanese national team in the 1992 Summer Olympics, where he won a bronze medal. He returned to the olympics four years later, winning a silver medal at the 1996 Summer Olympics. Professional players were allowed to participate in the 2000 Summer Olympics, but Sugiura was still chosen as the captain of the Japanese national team, and the captain of the entire Japanese olympic team in 2000 Summer Olympics. The Japanese team did not win a medal that year.

Sugiura refused numerous offers to join the Japanese professional leagues and retired in 2000. The Nippon Life Insurance Company baseball team won the Intercity Baseball Tournament twice during the 10 years Sugiura played with the team. He also marked a record five career wins in the olympic tournaments.

He served as a pitching coach for his team from 2001 to 2004 and became the manager in 2006.
