= Lázaro Vargas =

Cuban baseball player

Medal record

Men's baseball

Representing Cuba

Olympic Games
Gold medal – first place	1992 Barcelona	Team
Gold medal – first place	1996 Atlanta	Team

Baseball World Cup
Gold medal – first place	1986 Amsterdam	Team
Gold medal – first place	1988 Rome	Team

Intercontinental Cup
Gold medal – first place	1985 Edmonton	Team
Gold medal – first place	1987 Havana	Team
Silver medal – second place	1997 Barcelona	Team

Pan American Games
Gold medal – first place	1987 Indianapolis	Team
Gold medal – first place	1991 Havana	Team

Central American and Caribbean Games
Gold medal – first place	1986 Santiago de los Caballeros	Team

Lázaro Vargas Álvarez (born January 18, 1964) is a Cuban baseball player and Olympic gold medalist.

Vargas is a two time gold medalist for baseball, winning at the 1992 Summer Olympics and the 1996 Summer Olympics.

He is the father of Chicago White Sox third baseman Miguel Vargas.
