= Wang Kuang-shih =

Taiwanese baseball player

- Infielder
- Born: 2 August 1967 (age 58); Guangfu, Hualien County, Taiwan
- Batted: Right Threw: Right

CPBL debut
- March 12, 1993, for the China Times Eagles

Last appearance
- June 15, 1997, for the China Times Eagles

CPBL statistics
- Batting average: .276
- Home runs: 20
- Runs batted in: 125
- Stats at Baseball Reference

Teams
- China Times Eagles (1993–1997)
Medals
Representing Chinese Taipei
Men's baseball
Olympic Games
Silver medal – second place	1992 Barcelona	Team

Wang Kuang-Shih (Chinese: 王光熙; pinyin: Wáng Guāngxī; born 2 August 1967) is a Taiwanese baseball player who competed in the 1992 Summer Olympics.

He was part of the Chinese Taipei baseball team which won the silver medal. He played as infielder.
