= Keiichi Kawanaka =

Japanese swimmer (born 1973)

Personal information
- Full name: Keiichi Kawanaka
- Nationality: Japan
- Born: January 10, 1973 (age 53) Kyoto, Japan
- Height: 1.79 m (5 ft 10 in)
- Weight: 64 kg (141 lb)

Sport
- Sport: Swimming
- Strokes: Butterfly
Medal record
Men's swimming
Representing Japan
Pan Pacific Championships
Bronze medal – third place	1991 Edmonton	200 m butterfly

Keiichi Kawanaka (川中 恵一, Kawanaka Keiichi) (born January 10, 1973, in Kyoto) is a retired male butterfly swimmer from Japan, who represented his native country at the 1992 Summer Olympics. His best result in three starts in Barcelona, Spain was the fifth place (1:58.97) in the Men's 200m Butterfly event.
