= José Raúl Delgado =

Cuban baseball player

Medal record

Men's baseball

Representing Cuba

Summer Olympics
Gold medal – first place	1992 Barcelona	Team

Intercontinental Cup
Gold medal – first place	1989 San Juan	Team
Gold medal – first place	1991 Barcelona	Team
Gold medal – first place	1993 Italy	Team

Pan American Games
Gold medal – first place	1991 Havana	Team

Central American and Caribbean Games
Gold medal – first place	1990 Mexico City	Team
Gold medal – first place	1993 Ponce	Team

José Raúl Delgado Díez (born August 25, 1960) is a Cuban baseball player and Olympic gold medalist. Delgado is a one time gold medalist for baseball, winning at the 1992 Summer Olympics. He is the uncle of Lourdes Gourriel, and the granduncle of Yulieski Gourriel.
