= Chang Wen-tsung =

Taiwanese baseball player

- First baseman
- Born: April 17, 1968 (age 57); Tainan, Taiwan
- Batted: Left Threw: Left

CPBL debut
- March 12, 1993, for the Jungo Bears

Last appearance
- September 3, 2003, for the Uni-President Lions

CPBL statistics
- Batting average: .255
- Home runs: 46
- Runs batted in: 306
- Stats at Baseball Reference

Teams
- As player: Jungo Bears/Sinon Bulls (1993–1997); Uni-President Lions (2000–2003); As manager: Sinon Bulls (2012); As coach: Sinon Bulls (2005–2006, 2011–2012)

Career highlights and awards
- Taiwan Series champion (2000); 2× CPBL Golden Glove Award (1996, 2000); 5× CPBL All-Star (1993, 1995, 1997, 2000–2001)
Medals
Representing Chinese Taipei
Men's baseball
Olympic Games
Silver medal – second place	1992 Barcelona	Team
World Junior Baseball Championship
Silver medal – second place	1986 Windsor	Team

Chang Wen-tsung (Chinese: 張文宗; pinyin: Zhāng Wénzōng; born 17 April 1968) is a Taiwanese baseball player who competed in the 1992 Summer Olympics.

He was part of the Chinese Taipei baseball team which won the silver medal. He played as outfielder.
