= Chang Cheng-hsien =

Taiwanese baseball player

- Catcher
- Born: February 8, 1967 (age 58); Puzi, Chiayi County, Taiwan
- Batted: Right Threw: Right

CPBL debut
- March 12, 1993, for the China Times Eagles

Last appearance
- October 20, 1996, for the China Times Eagles

CPBL statistics
- Batting average: .232
- Home runs: 12
- Runs batted in: 65

Teams
- China Times Eagles (1993–1996)
Medals
Representing Chinese Taipei
Men's baseball
Olympic Games
Silver medal – second place	1992 Barcelona	Team

Chang Cheng-Hsien (Chinese: 張正憲; pinyin: Zhāng Zhèngxiàn; born 8 February 1967) is a Taiwanese baseball player who competed in the 1992 Summer Olympics.

He was part of the Chinese Taipei baseball team which won the silver medal. He played as catcher.
