= Lo Kuo-chong =

Taiwanese baseball player (born 1965)

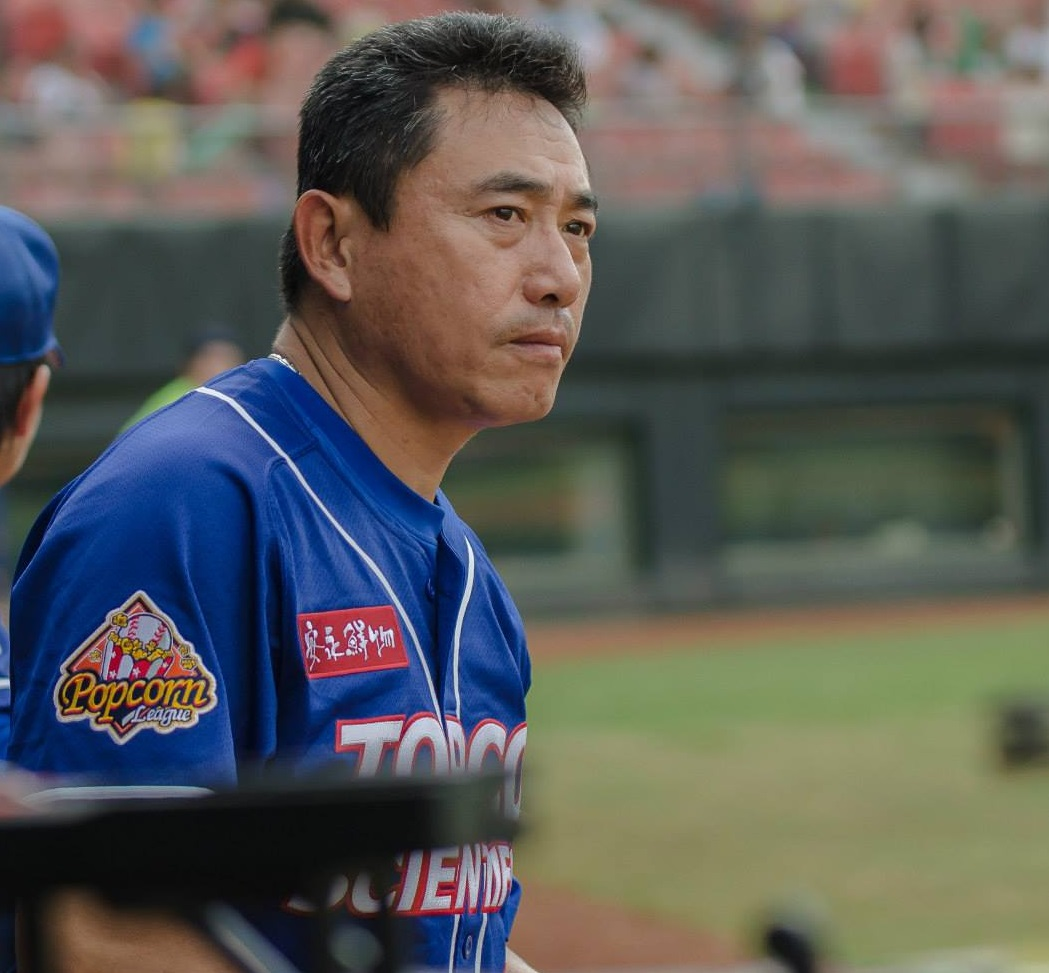
- Shortstop
- Born: September 16, 1965 (age 60); Hsinchu, Taiwan
- Bats: Right Throws: Right

debut
- March 15, 1994, for the Uni-President Lions

Career statistics (through 2002)
- Games: 740
- Batting average: 0.251
- Hits: 649
- Home runs: 1
- RBIs: 235
- Stolen bases: 50
- Stats at Baseball Reference

Teams
- Uni-President Lions (1994–2002)

Career highlights and awards
- CPBL Rookie of the Year (1994)
Medals
Men's baseball
Representing Chinese Taipei
Men's Baseball
Silver medal – second place	1992 Barcelona	Team

Lo Kuo-chong (Chinese: 羅國璋; pinyin: Luó Guózhāng; born 16 September 1965 in Hsinchu, Taiwan, also spelled Lo Kuo-chang) is a retired Taiwanese professional baseball player and currently a baseball coach. He had been well known for his excellent fielding ability, which was demonstrated by setting CPBL's record of did not error in a streak of continuous 153 fielding chances during his rookie 1994 season, and was a frequent member of the Chinese Taipei national baseball team from mid-1980s to early 1990s, participating the 1988 and 1992 Summer Olympics where he won a silver medal in 1992.

After the 1992 Olympics Lo joined then amateur Sampo Giants in anticipation to join CPBL the next year. However his hope temporarily vanished when CPBL rejected Sampo Giants's application late in 1992. Lo later sought to join Uni-President Lions before the 1994 CPBL season, and stayed with the team to date, originally as player (1994~2002) and later as fielding coach (since 2003 to date). He was also briefly promoted as the team's acting manager in mid-2007 for two months.

== Trivia ==
- He won the 1996 CPBL Rookie of the Year award at the age of 31, therefore was jokingly referred to as old man of the year (Chinese: 老人王) by commentators and players.
