= Ermidelio Urrutia =

Cuban baseball player (born 1963)

- Outfielder
- Born: 25 August 1963 (age 63); Las Tunas, Cuba
- Bats: Right Throws: Right
Medals
Men's baseball
Representing Cuba
Olympic Games
Gold medal – first place	1992 Barcelona	Team
Baseball World Cup
Gold medal – first place	1988 Rome	Team
Gold medal – first place	1990 Edmonton	Team
Gold medal – first place	1994 Managua	Team
Intercontinental Cup
Gold medal – first place	1987 Havana	Team
Gold medal – first place	1989 San Juan	Team
Pan American Games
Gold medal – first place	1991 Havana	Team
Gold medal – first place	1995 Mar del Plata	Team
Central American and Caribbean Games
Gold medal – first place	1990 Mexico City	Team
Gold medal – first place	1993 Ponce	Team
Goodwill Games
Gold medal – first place	1990 Seattle	Team

Ermidelio Urrutia Quiroga (born 25 August 1963) is a Cuban professional baseball manager and former outfielder, as well as an Olympic gold medalist.

== Career ==
Urrutia was born on 25 August 1963 in Macagua 8, Las Tunas, Cuba. Urrutia played during sixteen seasons in the Cuban National Series for Las Tunas, hitting .310 with 210 home runs, 268 doubles, 865 runs batted in, 865 runs scored and 180 stolen bases.

Urrutia made his debut with the Cuba national baseball team in the 1987 Intercontinental Cup played in Havana. Urrutia was part of the Cuban team that won the gold medal at the 1992 Summer Olympics.

== Personal life ==
His son, Henry Urrutia, also played baseball in Cuba, until he defected; Henry later played in Major League Baseball for the Baltimore Orioles.
