= Giorge Díaz =

Cuban baseball player

- Pitcher
- Born: September 16, 1970 (age 55)
- Bats: Right Throws: Right
Medals
Men's baseball
Representing Cuba
Summer Olympics
| Gold medal – first place | 1992 Barcelona | Team |
Intercontinental Cup
| Gold medal – first place | 1993 Italy | Team |

Giorge Díaz Loren (born September 16, 1970) is a Cuban baseball player and Olympic gold medalist. Díaz is a one-time gold medalist for baseball, winning at the 1992 Summer Olympics.
