= Chung Yu-cheng =

Taiwanese baseball player

- Pitcher
- Born: December 25, 1973 (age 52); Shanhua Township, Tainan County, Taiwan
- Batted: Right Threw: Right

CPBL debut
- August 25, 2000, for the Brother Elephants

Last appearance
- August 25, 2000, for the Brother Elephants

CPBL statistics
- Win–loss record: 0–0
- Earned run average: 0.00
- Strikeouts: 0
- Stats at Baseball Reference

Teams
- Brother Elephants (2000)
Medals
Representing Chinese Taipei
Men's baseball
Olympic Games
Silver medal – second place	1992 Barcelona	Team

Chung Yu-cheng (simplified Chinese: 钟宇政; traditional Chinese: 鍾宇政; pinyin: Zhōng Yǔzhèng; born December 25, 1973) is a Taiwanese baseball player who competed in the 1992 Summer Olympics.

He was part of the Chinese Taipei baseball team which won the silver medal. He is a right-handed pitcher.
