= Koji Tokunaga =

Japanese baseball player (born 1968)

Personal information
- Born: 1968 (age 57–58)
Medal record
Men's baseball
Bronze medal – third place	Barcelona 1992	Team competition

Koji Tokunaga (徳永 耕治, Tokunaga Koji; born September 3, 1968, in Tokyo, Tokyo, Japan) is a Japanese baseball player. He won a bronze medal at the 1992 Summer Olympics.
