= Kazutaka Nishiyama =

Japanese baseball player

- Pitcher
- Born: August 28, 1970; Kōchi, Kōchi, Japan
- Batted: Right Threw: Right

NPB debut
- October 3, 1993, for the Yomiuri Giants

Last appearance
- April 25, 2002, for the Yomiuri Giants

NPB statistics (through 2003)
- Win–loss record: 24–18
- Earned run average: 4.11
- Strikeouts: 258
- Saves: 12

Teams
- Yomiuri Giants (1993–2003)
Medals
Men's baseball
Representing Japan
Olympic Games
| Bronze medal – third place | 1992 Barcelona | Team competition |

Kazutaka Nishiyama (西山 一宇, Nishiyama Kazutaka; born August 28, 1970) is a retired Japanese professional baseball player from Kōchi, Japan.

Nishiyama was drafted in the 5th round of the 1988 amateur draft by the Lotte Orions, but did not sign with the team. He entered the professional leagues in 1993 as the 3rd round draft pick of the Yomiuri Giants. He marked a 5–1 record and 7 saves with a stunning 0.55 ERA in his 3rd year, but his pitching deteriorated afterwards. He was a vital part of the relief staff in 1998, marking a 2.48 ERA in 49 appearances, but was inconsistent in the following years. He began throwing from the sidearm in 2002 to fix his control problems, but was not signed for the next season. He currently works as a coach for the Yomiuri Giants organization.

He won a bronze medal in the 1992 Summer Olympics before entering the Japanese professional leagues.
