= Kento Sugiyama =

Japanese baseball player

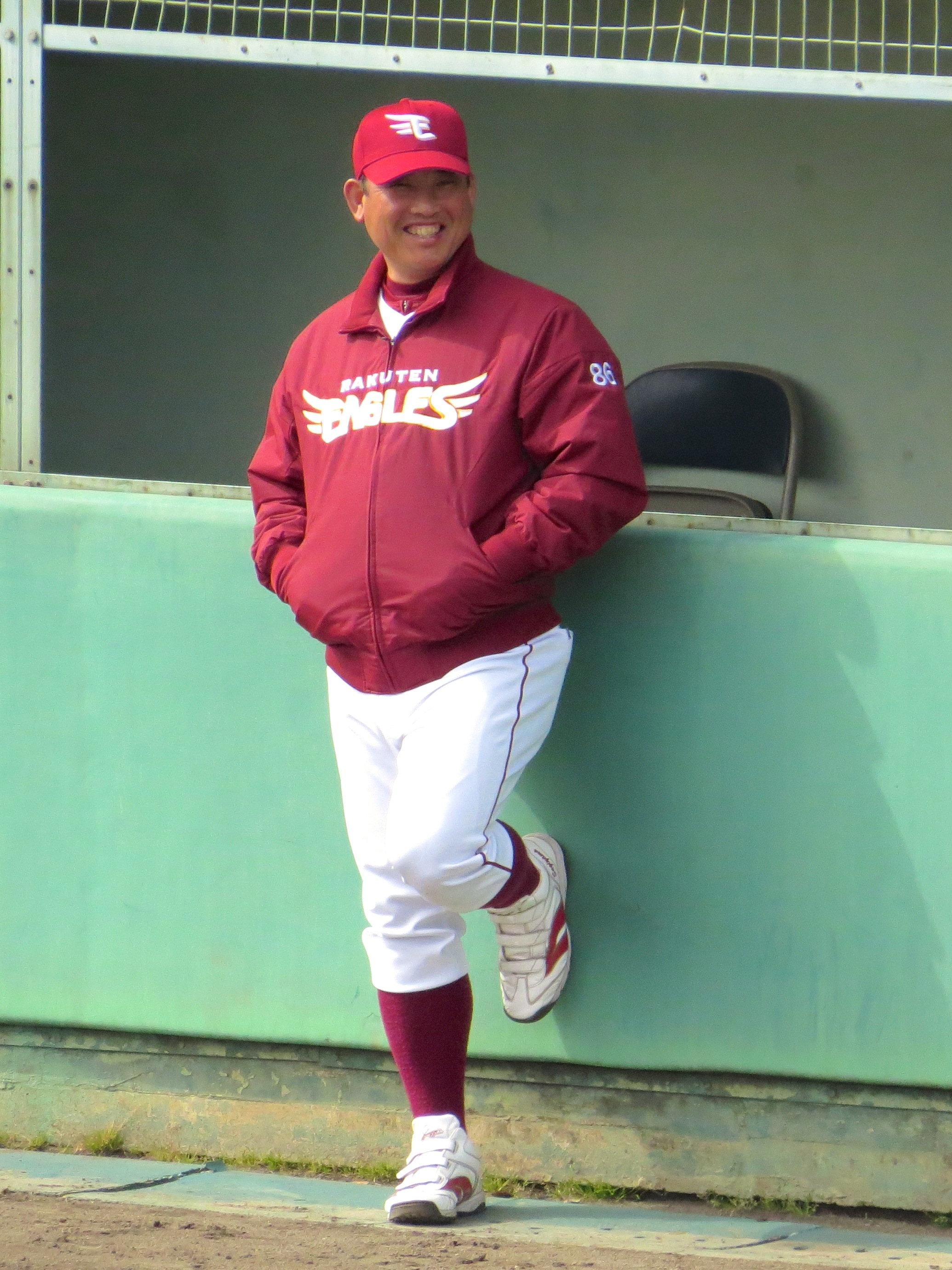
- Sugiyama with the Tohoku Rakuten Golden Eagles
- Pitcher / Coach
- Born: December 12, 1968 (age 57)
- Batted: Left Threw: Left

NPB debut
- April 15, 1993, for the Seibu Lions

Last appearance
- September 13, 2001, for the Yokohama BayStars

NPB statistics
- Win–loss–tie: 17–13–17
- ERA: 3.91
- Strikeouts: 295
- Stats at Baseball Reference

Teams
- As player: Seibu Lions (1993–1999); Hanshin Tigers (1999–2000); Osaka Kintetsu Buffaloes (2000–2001); Yokohama BayStars (2001); As coach: Tohoku Rakuten Golden Eagles (2006–2009, 2015–2016); Lamigo Monkeys (2017); Saitama Seibu Lions (2018–2021)
Medals
Representing Japan
Men's baseball
Summer Olympics
Bronze medal – third place	Barcelona 1992	Team

Kento Sugiyama (杉山 賢人, Sugiyama Kento; born December 12, 1968) is a retired Japanese professional baseball player from Numazu, Shizuoka, Japan. He played for the Seibu Lions, Hanshin Tigers, Osaka Kintetsu Buffaloes, and Yokohama BayStars during his 10-year career in the Japanese professional leagues.

Sugiyama was drafted in the first round of the 1992 amateur draft by the Seibu Lions, and won the Japanese rookie of the year award in 1993, making 54 appearances with a 2.80 ERA. His pitching deteriorated from then on, and he was traded to the Hanshin Tigers in mid-1999. He was traded to the Osaka Kintetsu Buffaloes in mid-2000, and was traded for the third time in his career in mid-2001 to the Yokohama BayStars. He made 32 appearances with the BayStars in 2001, but retired at the end of the season.

He worked as a batting pitcher for the BayStars before becoming the pitching coach for the Tohoku Rakuten Golden Eagles in 2006.

He won a bronze medal in the 1992 Summer Olympics before entering the Japanese professional leagues.
