= Yasunori Takami =

Japanese baseball player (born 1964)

Medal record

Men's baseball
Bronze medal – third place	Barcelona 1992	Team competition

Yasunori Takami (高見 泰範, Takami Yasunori) (born January 6, 1964, in Gifu, Gifu, Japan) is a Japanese baseball player. He won a bronze medal at the 1992 Summer Olympics. He has also coached the Japan national baseball team at the international level.
