= Koichi Oshima =

Japanese baseball player

- Coach / Infielder
- Born: June 17, 1967 (age 58); Itabashi, Tokyo, Japan
- Batted: Switch Threw: Right

NPB debut
- April 18, 1993, for the Kintetsu Buffaloes

Last NPB appearance
- September 28, 2005, for the Tohoku Rakuten Golden Eagles

NPB statistics
- Batting average: .261
- Hits: 1088
- Runs batted in: 334
- Stolen Bases: 71
- Home runs: 24

Teams
- As player: Kintetsu Buffaloes (1993 – 1995); Orix BlueWave (1996 – 2004); Tohoku Rakuten Golden Eagles (2005); As coach: Orix Buffaloes (2006–2015)

Career highlights and awards
- 2× NPB Best Nine Award (1996, 2000); 3× NPB Golden Glove Award (1996, 1997, 2000); NPB All-Star (2000)
Medals
Representing Japan
Men's baseball
Summer Olympics
Bronze medal – third place	Barcelona 1992	Team
Intercontinental Cup
Silver medal – second place	Barcelona 1991	Team

Koichi Oshima (大島 公一, Oshima Koichi; born June 17, 1967) is a retired Japanese professional baseball player from Itabashi, Tokyo, Japan. He played for the Kintetsu Buffaloes, Orix Buffaloes, and Tohoku Rakuten Golden Eagles during his professional career, and currently works as a minor league hitting coach for the Orix Buffaloes.

Oshima was a valuable switch hitter and a solid fielder, winning three Japanese golden glove awards at second base, and two Best Nine awards. He dismissed an offer to work as a coach when the Osaka Kintetsu Buffaloes and Orix BlueWave merged, and played a season with the Tohoku Rakuten Golden Eagles before becoming a coach for the Orix Buffaloes in 2006.

He won a bronze medal in the 1992 Summer Olympics before entering the Japanese professional leagues.
