= Yasuhiro Sato =

Japanese baseball player (born 1967)

Medal record

Men's baseball

Representing Japan

Olympic Games
Bronze medal – third place	1992 Barcelona	Team competition

Yasuhiro Sato (佐藤 康弘, Satō Yasuhiro; born July 25, 1967) is a Japanese baseball player. Born in Tochigi, he won a bronze medal at the 1992 Summer Olympics.
