= Akihiro Togo =

Japanese baseball player

Personal information
- Born: February 18, 1967 (age 59) Kōchi, Kōchi, Japan
Medal record
Men's baseball
Representing Japan
Olympic Games
Bronze medal – third place	Barcelona 1992	Team competition

Akihiro Togo (十河章浩; born February 18, 1967) is a Japanese baseball player. He won a bronze medal at the 1992 Summer Olympics.
