= 1989 Asian Baseball Championship =

Tournament details
- Country: South Korea
- Teams: 7
- Defending champions: Chinese Taipei

Final positions
- Champions: Japan (9th title)
- Runners-up: South Korea
- Fourth place: China

The 1989 Asian Baseball Championship was the fifteenth continental tournament held by the Baseball Federation of Asia. The tournament was held in Seoul, South Korea for the fifth time. The tournament was won by Japan for the ninth time. It was the first time that South Korea had not won an Asian Championship while hosting the tournament.

South Korea shared the silver medal with the defending champions Chinese Taipei. This was the third time that the silver medal had been shared; all three times involving Chinese Taipei. China (4th), Guam (5th), Philippines (6th) and India (7th) were the other participants.

== Bibliography ==
- Bjarkman, Peter C. (2005). Diamonds Around the Globe: The Encyclopedia of International Baseball. Westport, CT United States: Greenwood Press. ISBN 0-313-32268-6. OCLC 58806121.
