= Shigeki Wakabayashi =

Japanese baseball player (born 1966)

Personal information
- Born: December 24, 1966 (age 59) Saiki, Ōita
Medal record
Men's baseball
Representing Japan
Olympic Games
Bronze medal – third place	1992 Barcelona	Team competition

Shigeki Wakabayashi (若林 重喜, Wakabayashi Shigeki; born December 24, 1966) is a Japanese baseball player. Born in Ōita, he won a bronze medal at the 1992 Summer Olympics.
