= Tomohito Ito =

Japanese baseball player (born 1970)

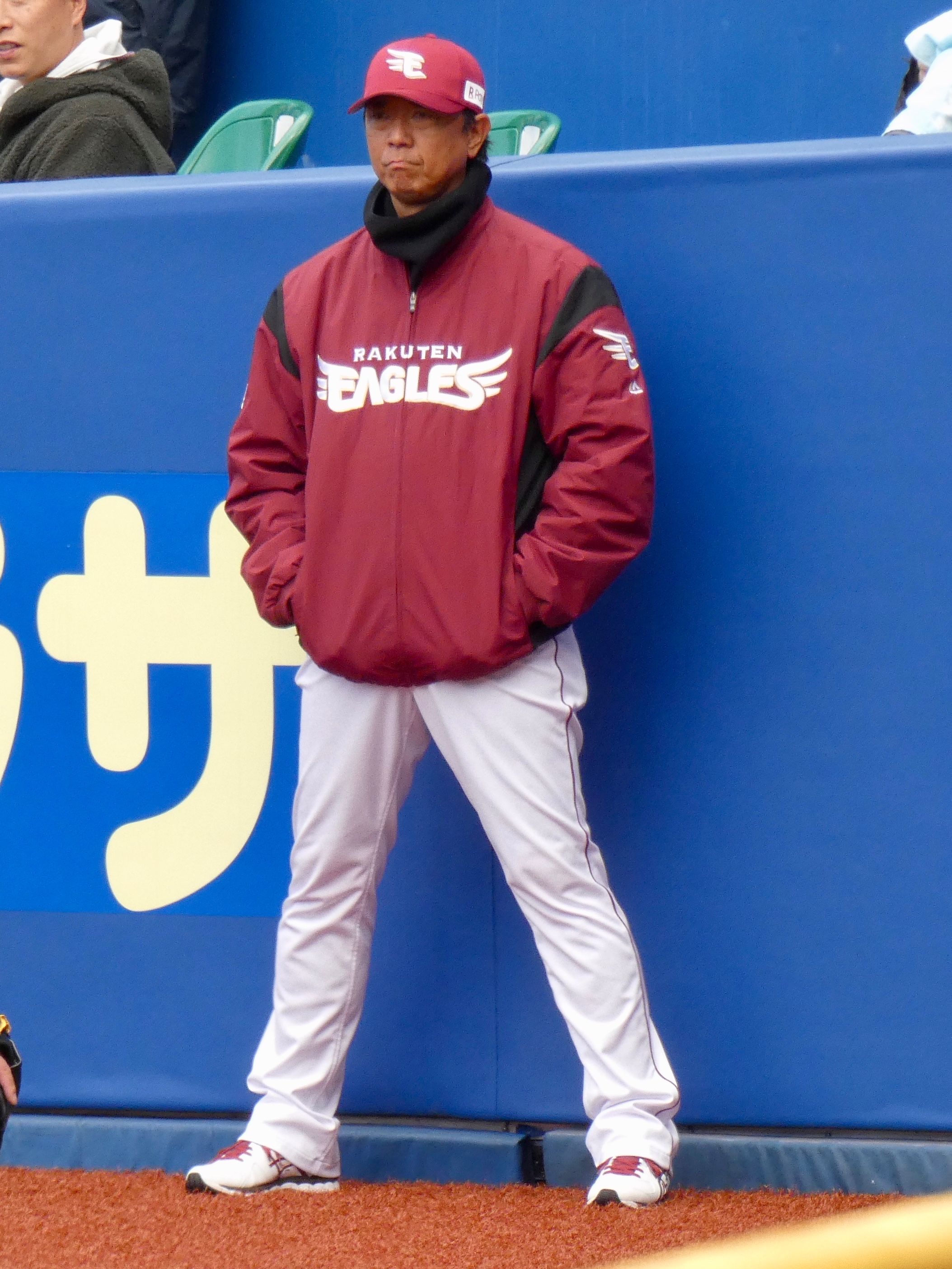

Tokyo Yakult Swallows – No. 89
- Pitcher / Coach
- Born: October 30, 1970 (age 55); Kyoto
- Batted: Right Threw: Right

NPB debut
- April 20, 1993, for the Yakult Swallows

Last NPB appearance
- April 10, 2001, for the Yakult Swallows

NPB statistics
- Win–loss record: 37–27
- Earned run average: 2.31
- Strikeouts: 548
- Stats at Baseball Reference

Teams
- As player: Yakult Swallows (1993–2003); As coach: Yakult Swallows / Tokyo Yakult Swallows (2004–2017, 2021–present); Tohoku Rakuten Golden Eagles (2019–2020)

Career highlights and awards
- Central League Rookie of the Year (1993); Comeback Player of the Year (1997)
Medals
Men's baseball
Representing Japan
Olympic Games
Bronze medal – third place	1992 Barcelona	Team competition

Tomohito Ito (伊藤 智仁; born October 30, 1970) is a Japanese former professional baseball player from Kyoto, Japan. He played for the Yakult Swallows from 1993–2003 before retiring. He currently works as a pitching coach for the Tokyo Yakult Swallows.

He won a bronze medal in the 1992 Summer Olympics before entering the Japanese professional leagues.

== Biography ==
Ito was a phenomenon in his rookie year, going 7-2 with a 0.91 ERA in 14 games as a starter before injuring his pitching arm in July. His rookie-year slider is said to be one of the best pitches ever to be thrown in Japanese baseball history, reaching the low-90 mph range with an enormous amount of horizontal movement. He beat Hideki Matsui to win the 1993 Japanese rookie of the year award, even though he was only active for 3 months that year.

Despite making a brilliant debut, Ito was plagued by various injuries to his pitching arm, and did not play a single game from 1994–1995. He had surgery on his shoulder, and spent almost three years in rehabilitation before returning in 1996.

In 1997, he made a huge comeback as a closer, marking 19 saves with a 1.51 ERA. He returned to the starting rotation in 1998, and marked a 2.72 ERA in 29 starts.

He was able to pitch in the starting rotation until 2000, but sustained various other injuries to his legs and shoulder, and he had surgery on his right shoulder in October, 1999. His 2001 season ended in April, and he had shoulder surgery for the third time in his career that year. He pitched in a minor league game in October, 2002, and struck out the first batter he faced before dislocating his shoulder against the second batter. He threw only nine pitches that day.

The team suggested he retire, but Ito refused, and made a comeback on October 24, 2003, pitching in a minor league game against the Yomiuri Giants. The fastest pitch he threw was a 67 mph (109 km/h) fastball, and he walked two of the three batters he faced. He announced his retirement five days later.

Ito's remarkable slider was enabled by a loose shoulder joint. A loose shoulder allows more arm movement, but dislocation occurs far more frequently. Despite his short career, (he played only 127 games in the professional leagues) he is remembered as one of the most remarkable Japanese pitchers in the 1990s.
