= Takashi Miwa =

Japanese baseball player (born 1969)

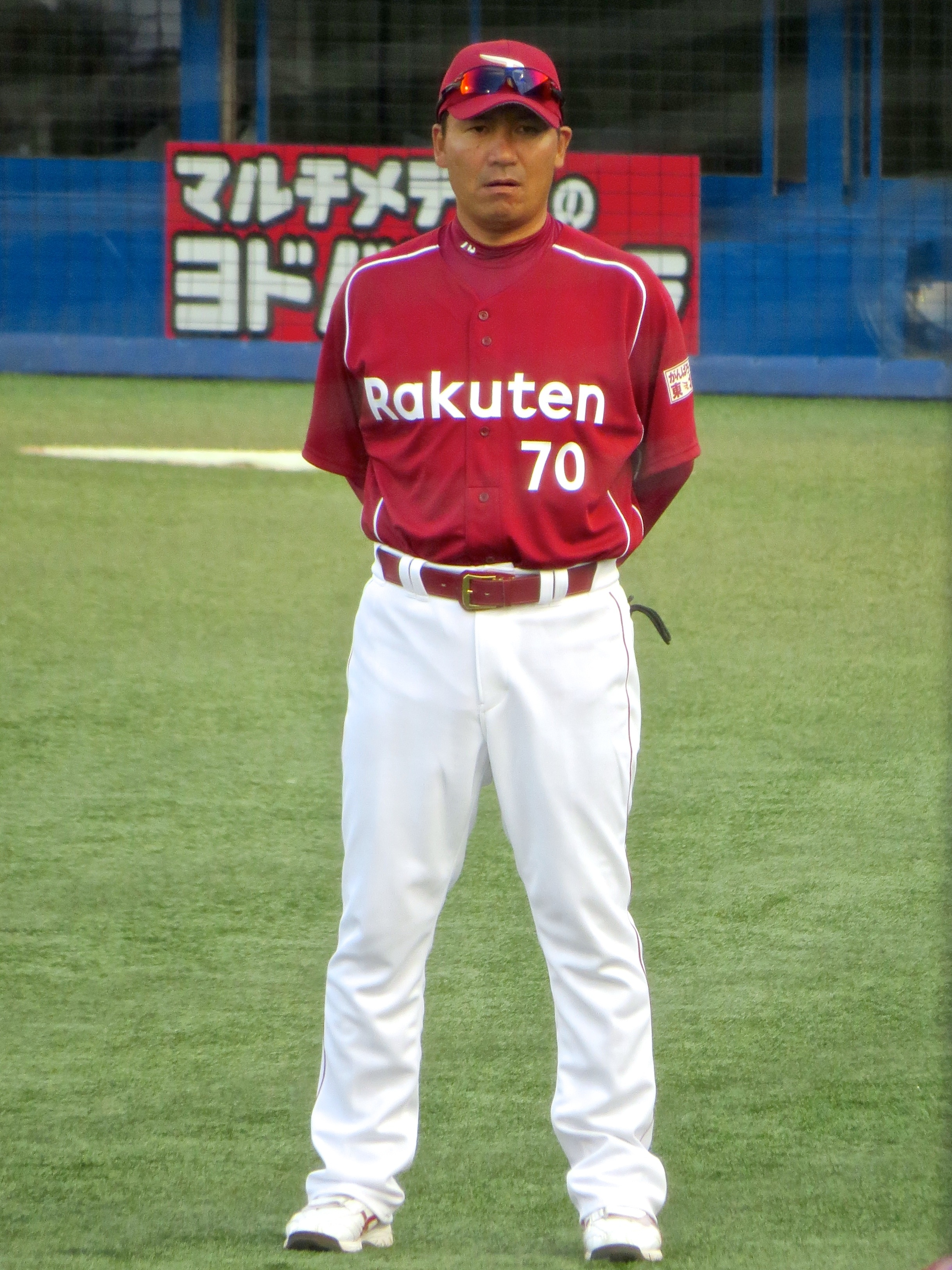
- Catcher / Coach
- Born: December 1, 1969 (age 56); Kashiwa, Chiba
- Batted: Right Threw: Right

NPB debut
- June 23, 1994, for the Orix BlueWave

Last NPB appearance
- September 27, 2004, for the Orix BlueWave

NPB statistics (through 2004 season)
- Batting average: .222
- Hits: 282
- RBIs: 115
- Stolen bases: 4
- Stats at Baseball Reference

Teams
- As player: Orix BlueWave (1994–2004); As coach: Orix Buffaloes (2005–2010, 2016–2020); Tohoku Rakuten Golden Eagles (2011–2014)

Career highlights and awards
- Japan Series champion (2013)
Medals
Representing Japan
Men's baseball
Summer Olympics
Bronze medal – third place	Barcelona 1992	Team
Intercontinental Cup
Silver medal – second place	Barcelona 1991	Team
Bronze medal – third place	Italy 1993	Team

Takashi Miwa (三輪 隆, born December 1, 1969) is a former professional baseball player from Chiba, Japan. He was drafted by the Orix BlueWave in the second round of the 1993 amateur draft, and played with the team until 2004. He was the team representative for the BlueWave in the Japanese baseball players union during the 2004 Japanese baseball strike.

He won a bronze medal in the 1992 Summer Olympics before entering the Japanese professional leagues.
