= Shinichi Sato (baseball) =

Japanese baseball player

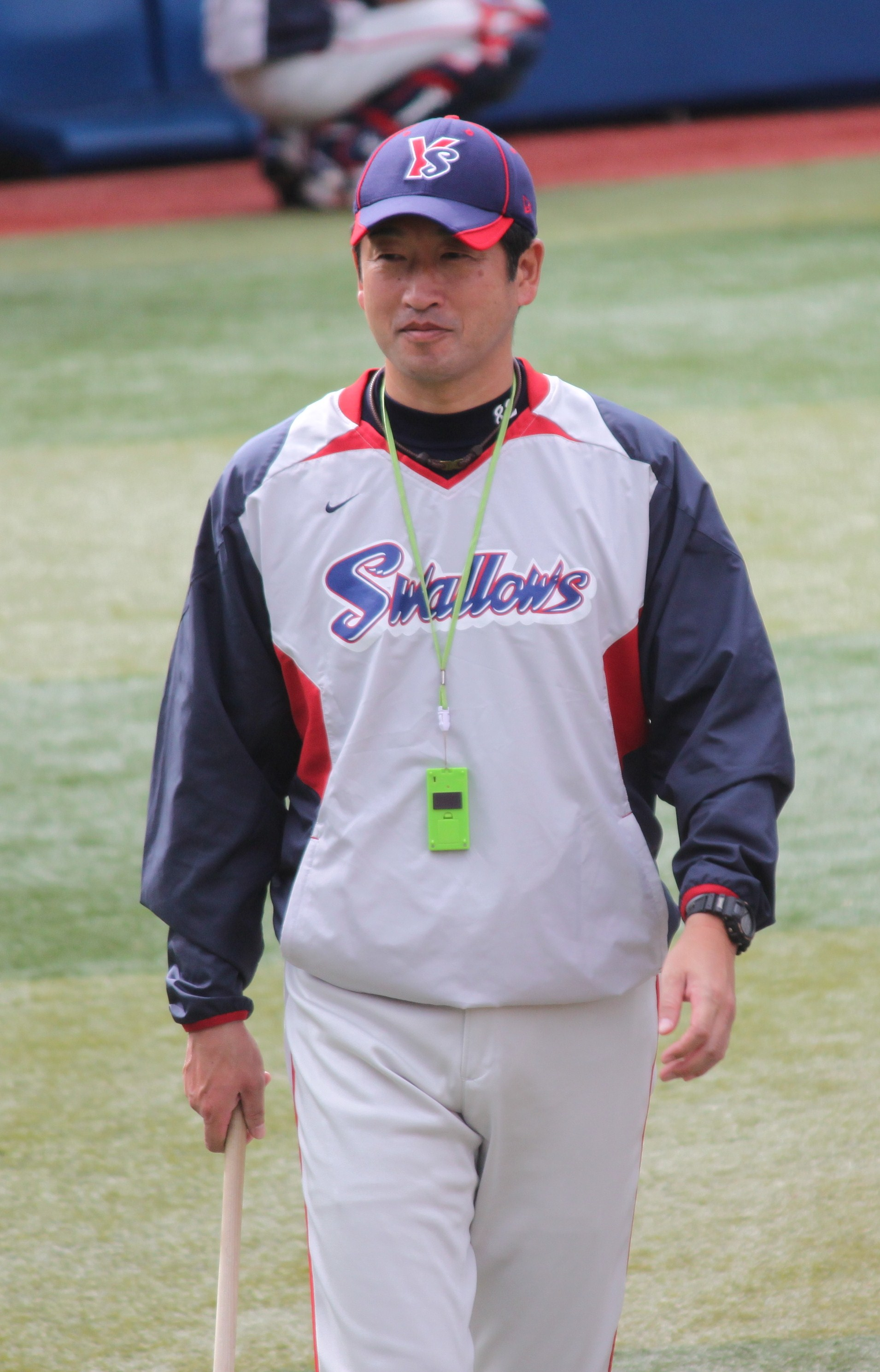
- Outfielder / Coach
- Born: August 7, 1965 (age 60); Sapporo, Hokkaido
- Batted: Right Threw: Right

NPB debut
- April 11, 1993, for the Fukuoka Daiei Hawks

Last NPB appearance
- October 11, 2005, for the Yakult Swallows

NPB statistics
- Batting average: .261
- Hits: 376
- Runs batted in: 155
- Stolen Bases: 25
- Home runs: 36
- Stats at Baseball Reference

Teams
- As players: Fukuoka Daiei Hawks (1993–1995); Yakult Swallows (1996–2005); As coach: Tokyo Yakult Swallows (2006–2014, 2021–2023); Orix Buffaloes (2015)
Medals
Men's baseball
Bronze medal – third place	Barcelona 1992	Team competition

Shinichi Sato (佐藤 真一, Satō Shin'ichi), born August 7, 1965, is a retired Japanese professional baseball player from Sapporo, Hokkaidō, Japan.

Sato joined the Fukuoka Daiei Hawks at age 28, but did not live up to expectations with the team. He was traded to the Yakult Swallows in 1996, and played in 113 games in 1999, marking a .341 batting average. He also broke the team record with 25 consecutive game hits. He was relegated to pinch-hitting duty afterwards, and retired after the 2005 season at age 40. He currently works as a batting coach under Tokyo Yakult Swallows manager Junji Ogawa.

He won a bronze medal in the 1992 Summer Olympics before entering the Japanese professional leagues.
