= Hiroyuki Sakaguchi =

Japanese baseball player (born 1965)

Medal record

Men's baseball

Representing Japan

Olympic Games
| Bronze medal – third place | 1992 Barcelona | Team |

Intercontinental Cup
| Silver medal – second place | 1991 Barcelona | Team |

Hiroyuki Sakaguchi (坂口 裕之, Sakaguchi Hiroyuki; born August 2, 1965 in Miyazaki Prefecture, Japan) is a Japanese baseball player. He won a bronze medal at the 1992 Summer Olympics.
