= Hiroshi Nakamoto =

Japanese baseball player (born 1966)

Medal record

Representing Japan

Men's baseball

Summer Olympics
Bronze medal – third place	Barcelona 1992	Team

Intercontinental Cup
Silver medal – second place	Barcelona 1991	Team

Hiroshi Nakamoto (中本 浩, Nakamoto Hiroshi; born August 22, 1966 in Osaka Prefecture, Japan) is a Japanese baseball player. He won a bronze medal at the 1992 Summer Olympics.
