= Katsumi Watanabe =

Japanese baseball player (born 1962)

- Pitcher
- Born: May 16, 1962 (age 64)
- Bats: Right Throws: Left
Medals
Men's baseball
Representing Japan
Olympic Games
Bronze medal – third place	1992 Barcelona	Team

Katsumi Watanabe (渡部 勝美, Watanabe Katsumi; born May 16, 1962) is a Japanese baseball player. He was awarded the bronze medal, along with the rest of the Japanese team, during baseball's first ever appearance as an official Olympic sport, during the 1992 Summer Olympics.
