= Shinichiro Kawabata =

Japanese baseball player (born 1966)

Personal information
- Born: December 5, 1966 (age 59)
Medal record
Men's baseball
Representing Japan
Olympic Games
Bronze medal – third place	1992 Barcelona	Team competition
Goodwill Games
Silver medal – second place	1990 Seattle	Team

Shin'ichiro Kawabata (川畑 伸一郎, Kawabata Shin'ichiro; born December 5, 1966) is a Japanese baseball player. He won a bronze medal at the 1992 Summer Olympics.
