= 1991 Asian Baseball Championship =

Tournament details
- Country: China
- Teams: 7
- Defending champions: Japan

Final positions
- Champions: Japan (10th title)
- Runners-up: Chinese Taipei
- Third place: South Korea
- Fourth place: Australia

The 1991 Asian Baseball Championship was the sixteenth continental tournament held by the Baseball Federation of Asia. The tournament was held in Beijing, China for the first time. The tournament was won by the defending champions Japan; their tenth Asian Championship.

China became the sixth nation to host the tournament in its history, finishing 6th. Taiwan (Chinese Taipei) (2nd), South Korea (3rd), Australia (4th), Philippines (5th) and Guam (7th) were the other participants.

== Bibliography ==
- Bjarkman, Peter C. (2005). Diamonds Around the Globe: The Encyclopedia of International Baseball. Westport, CT United States: Greenwood Press. ISBN 0-313-32268-6. OCLC 58806121.
