= Masahito Kohiyama =

Japanese baseball player

- Pitcher
- Born: May 7, 1969 (age 56); Shinjuku, Tokyo, Japan
- Batted: Right Threw: Right

NPB debut
- April 10, 1993, for the Yokohama BayStars

Last NPB appearance
- August 7, 2001, for the Yokohama BayStars

NPB statistics
- Win–loss record: 9–14
- Earned run average: 4.30
- Strikeouts: 213

CPBL statistics
- Win–loss record: 7–6
- Earned run average: 3.77
- Strikeouts: 102

Teams
- Yokohama BayStars (1993–1997, 1999–2001); Chinatrust Whales (2002)
Medals
Representing Japan
Men's baseball
Summer Olympics
Bronze medal – third place	Barcelona 1992	Team
Intercontinental Cup
Silver medal – second place	Barcelona 1991	Team

Masahito Kohiyama (小桧山 雅仁, Kohiyama Masahito; born May 7, 1969) is a Japanese former professional baseball pitcher. He played in Nippon Professional Baseball (NPB) for the Yokohama BayStars and in the Chinese Professional Baseball League (CPBL) for the Chinatrust Whales.

== Career ==
Kohiyama was drafted in the first round of the 1992 draft by the Yokohama BayStars. He was successful in his rookie year, pitching as the setup man for closer Kazuhiro Sasaki, but problems with control led the BayStars to drop him in 2001. He played with the Chinatrust Whales (a team in the Chinese Professional Baseball League) in 2002 before retiring. He currently works at TBS Radio & Communications.

He won a bronze medal in the 1992 Summer Olympics before entering the Japanese professional leagues. He pitched a shutout win against Puerto Rico in the Olympic tournament. He is the only pitcher to have recorded a shutout game in Olympic baseball.
