= Hirotami Kojima =

Japanese baseball player (born 1964)

Personal information
- Born: 1964 (age 61–62)
Medal record
Men's baseball
Bronze medal – third place	Barcelona 1992	Team competition

Hirotami Kojima (小島 啓民, Kojima Hirotami; born March 3, 1964 in Tokyo, Tokyo, Japan) is a Japanese baseball player. He won a bronze medal at the 1992 Summer Olympics, and has been a coach for Japan at international level.
