= Netherlands at the 1992 Summer Olympics =

- Flag of the Netherlands
- IOC code: NED
- NOC: Dutch Olympic Committee

in Barcelona
- Competitors: 201 (117 men, 84 women) in 20 sports
- Flag bearer: Carina Benninga (field hockey)
- Medals Ranked 20th: Gold 2 Silver 6 Bronze 7 Total 15

Summer Olympics appearances (overview)
- 1900; 1904; 1908; 1912; 1920; 1924; 1928; 1932; 1936; 1948; 1952; 1956; 1960; 1964; 1968; 1972; 1976; 1980; 1984; 1988; 1992; 1996; 2000; 2004; 2008; 2012; 2016; 2020; 2024

Other related appearances
- 1906 Intercalated Games

The Netherlands competed at the 1992 Summer Olympics in Barcelona, Spain. 201 competitors, 117 men and 84 women, took part in 105 events in 20 sports.

== Medalists ==
Medal	Name	Sport	Event	Date
Gold	Ellen van Langen	Athletics	Women's 800 metres	3 August
Gold	Jos Lansink; Piet Raymakers; Jan Tops	Equestrian	Team jumping	4 August
Silver	Léon van Bon	Cycling	Men's Points Race	31 July
Silver	Erik Dekker	Cycling	Men's individual road race	2 August
Silver	Tineke Bartels; Ellen Bontje; Anky van Grunsven; Annemarie Sanders	Equestrian	Team dressage	2 August
Silver	Orhan Delibaş	Boxing	Light middleweight	9 August
Silver	Piet Raymakers	Equestrian	Individual jumping	9 August
Silver	Netherlands men's national volleyball team: Edwin Benne; Peter Blangé; Ron Boudrie; Henk-Jan Held; Martin van der Horst; Marko Klok; Olof van der Meulen; Jan Posthuma; Avital Selinger; Martin Teffer; Ronald Zoodsma; Ron Zwerver	Volleyball	Men's tournament	9 August
Bronze	Monique Knol	Cycling	Women's individual road race	26 July
Bronze	Irene de Kok	Judo	Women's 72 kg	28 July
Bronze	Theo Meijer	Judo	Men's 95 kg	28 July
Bronze	Ingrid Haringa	Cycling	Women's sprint	31 July
Bronze	Nico Rienks; Henk-Jan Zwolle	Rowing	Men's double sculls	1 August
Bronze	Dorien de Vries	Sailing	Women's Lechner A-390	2 August
Bronze	Arnold Vanderlyde	Boxing	Heavyweight	8 August

== Competitors ==
The following is the list of number of competitors in the Games.

Sport	Men	Women	Total
Archery	3	3	6
Athletics	7	8	15
Badminton	0	3	3
Boxing	5	–	5
Canoeing	4	0	4
Cycling	13	4	17
Diving	1	1	2
Equestrian	6	6	12
Field hockey	16	16	32
Gymnastics	0	1	1
Judo	4	6	10
Rowing	13	7	20
Sailing	12	2	14
Shooting	3	1	4
Swimming	1	8	9
Synchronized swimming	–	3	3
Table tennis	1	2	3
Tennis	3	2	5
Volleyball	12	11	23
Water polo	13	–	13
Total	117	84	201

== Archery ==
The only elimination victory for the Dutch archers came from Erwin Verstegen, who won in the round of 32 before being defeated in the second round. Three archers did not make it to the elimination rounds.

Athlete	Event	Ranking round		Round of 32	Round of 16	Quarterfinal	Semifinal	Final / BM	
Athlete	Event	Score	Seed	Opposition Score	Opposition Score	Opposition Score	Opposition Score	Opposition Score	Rank
Erwin Verstegen	Men's individual	1279	28 Q	Fairweather (AUS); W 107–98	Barrs (USA); L 104–106	Did not advance			9
Henk Vogels	Men's individual	1266	34	Did not advance					34
Berny Camps	Men's individual	1242	55	Did not advance					55
Erwin Verstegen; Henk Vogels; Berny Camps	Men's Team	3787	12 Q	—N/a	Finland; L 236-237	Did not advance			9
Jacqueline van Rozendaal	Women's individual	1271	27 Q	Kvrivichvili (EUN); L 102-108	Did not advance				20
Christel Verstegen	Women's individual	1275	25 Q	Williamson (GBR); L 100-107	Did not advance				23
Adriana van Dyck	Women's individual	1154	59	Did not advance					59
Christel Verstegen; Jacqueline van Rozendaal; Adriana van Dyck	Women's Team	3700	14 Q	—N/a	Finland; L 230-230	Did not advance			12

== Athletics ==
Men
Track & road events

Athlete	Event	Heat		Quarterfinal		Semifinal		Final	
Athlete	Event	Result	Rank	Result	Rank	Result	Rank	Result	Rank
Robin van Helden	800 m	1:48.05	4 Q	—N/a		1:46.98	5	did not advance	
Marko Koers	800 m	1:46.88	2 Q	—N/a		1:52.23	7	did not advance	
Marcel Versteeg	5000 m	13:35.95	2 Q	—N/a				13:48.32	15
Bert van Vlaanderen	Marathon	—N/a						2:15.47	15
Tonnie Dirks	Marathon	—N/a							DNF
Harold van Beek	50 kilometres walk	—N/a						4:24.18	31

Combined events – Decathlon

Athlete	Event	100 m	LJ	SP	HJ	400 m	110H	DT	PV	JT	1500 m	Final	Rank
Robert de Wit	Result	10.09	7.02	15.48	2.00	49.24	14.89	48.34	4.80	61.36	4:41.39	8109	10
Robert de Wit	Points	841	818	819	803	850	863	836	849	749	672	8109	10

Women
Track & road events

Athlete	Event	Heat		Quarterfinal		Semifinal		Final	
Athlete	Event	Result	Rank	Result	Rank	Result	Rank	Result	Rank
Nelli Cooman	100 m	11.47	3 Q	11.55	5	did not advance			
Ellen van Langen	800 m	1:59.86	2 Q	—N/a		2:00.68	2 Q	1:55.54	1st place, gold medalist(s)
Stella Jongmans	800 m	2:02.26	5	did not advance					
Christien Toonstra	10000 m	32:07.42	5 Q	—N/a				31:47.38	11

== Boxing ==
Men

Athlete	Event	Round of 32	Round of 16	Quarterfinals	Semifinals	Final	
Athlete	Event	Opposition Result	Opposition Result	Opposition Result	Opposition Result	Opposition Result	Rank
Miguel Dias	Bantamweight	Klai (TUN); L 17–1	did not advance				
Orhan Delibaş	Light Middleweight	Choi (KOR); W 3–0	Boonsingkarn (THA); W RSC-2	Márquez (USA); W 16-12	Reid (GBR); W 8-3	Lemus (CUB); L 1-6	Silver
Raymond Joval	Middleweight	Aliu (SAM); W RSC-3	Dine (ALG); L 14-22	did not advance			
Arnold Vanderlyde	Heavyweight	Leti (SAM); W 14-0	Chae (KOR); W 14-13	Douglas (IRL); W RSC-1	Savón (CUB); L 3-23	Did not advance	Bronze
Jerry Nijman	Super Heavyweight	Rostami (IRI); W 9-5	Fischer (GER); L 5-22	did not advance			

== Cycling ==
Seventeen cyclists, thirteen men and four women, represented the Netherlands in 1992.

=== Road ===
Men

Athlete	Event	Time	Rank
Rob Compas	Road race	4:36:33	72
Erik Dekker	Road race	4:35:22	2nd place, silver medalist(s)
Richard Groenendaal	Road race	4:35:56	17
John den Braber; Pelle Kil; Bart Voskamp; Jaap ten Kortenaar	Team time trial	2:07:49	7

Women

Athlete	Event	Time	Rank
Monique Knol	Road race	2:05:03	3rd place, bronze medalist(s)
Leontien van Moorsel	Road race	2:05:03	23
Petra Grimbergen	Road race	2:05:03	29

=== Track ===
Sprint

Athlete	Event	Qualification		Round 2	Repechage 2	Repechage 2 final	Round 3	Repechage 3	Quarterfinals	Semifinals	Final	
Athlete	Event	Time Speed (km/h)	Rank	Opposition Time Speed (km/h)	Opposition Time Speed (km/h)	Opposition Time Speed (km/h)	Opposition Time Speed (km/h)	Opposition Time Speed (km/h)	Opposition Time Speed (km/h)	Opposition Time Speed (km/h)	Opposition Time Speed (km/h)	Rank
Dirk Jan van Hameren	Men's sprint	11.284; 63.807	17	Neiwand (AUS); González (COL); L	Andrews (NZL); L	did not advance						
Ingrid Haringa	Women's sprint	11.419; 63.052	1	Wang (CHN); Razmaitė (LTU); W12.179; 63.497	—N/a				Kuroki (JPN); W12.662,W 12.792	Neumann (GER); W12.263,L,L	Ballanger (GER); W12.402,W12.400	3rd place, bronze medalist(s)

Pursuit

Athlete	Event	Qualification		Quarter-finals	Semifinals	Finals	Rank
Athlete	Event	Time	Rank	Opponent Results	Opponent Results	Opponent Results	Rank
Servais Knaven	Men's individual pursuit	4:40.436	12q	Group B-Heat 1 Baldrián (TCH); W4:27.954	did not advance		9
Servais Knaven; Niels van der Steen; Gerben Broeren; Erik Cent	Men's team pursuit	4:25.693	12	did not advance			
Leontien van Moorsel	Women's individual pursuit	3:46.956	7Q	Heat 3 Rossner (GER); L3:49.795	did not advance		8

Time trial

Athlete	Event	Time	Rank
Dirk Jan van Hameren	Men's track time trial	1:05.524	9

Points race

Athlete	Event	Points	Rank
Léon van Bon	Points race	43	2nd place, silver medalist(s)

== Diving ==
Athlete	Event	Preliminary		Final	
Athlete	Event	Result	Rank	Result	Rank
Edwin Jongejans	Men's 3 metre springboard	383.13	7	581.40	7
Daphne Jongejans	Women's 3 metre springboard	277.29	14	did not advance	

== Hockey ==
=== Men's tournament ===
Head coach: Hans Jorritsma

- Frank Leistra (GK)
- Harrie Kwinten
- Cees Jan Diepeveen
- Pieter van Ede
- Bastiaan Poortenaar
- Wouter van Pelt
- Marc Delissen (C)
- Jacques Brinkman
- Gijs Weterings
- Stephan Veen
- Floris Jan Bovelander
- Hendrik Jan Kooijman
- Bart Looije (GK)
- Maarten van Grimbergen
- Leo Klein Gebbink
- Taco van den Honert

Group play

Teams	P	W	D	L	GF	GA	GD	Pts
Pakistan	5	5	0	0	20	6	+14	10
Netherlands	5	4	0	1	20	10	+10	8
Spain	5	3	0	2	15	11	+4	6
New Zealand	5	1	0	4	7	12	–5	2
CIS	5	1	0	4	12	20	–8	2
Malaysia	5	1	0	4	9	24	–15	2

Semi final

5 August 1992
17:00

Australia	3 – 2	Netherlands
Lewis 3'; Bodimeade 25'; Wark 37'	Report	Bovelander 19', 61'

Umpires:
Santiago Deo Valera (ESP)
Patrick van Beneden (BEL)

Bronze medal match

8 August 1992
17:00

Netherlands	3 – 4	Pakistan
Delissen 20'; Veen 22'; Weterings 69'	Report	Shahbaz 55'; Bashir 63', 68'; Ibrahim 67'

Umpires:
Patrick van Beneden (BEL)
Graham Dennis Nash (GBR)

=== Women's tournament ===
Head Coach: Roelant Oltmans

- Jacqueline Toxopeus (GK)
- Carina Bleeker (GK)
- Caroline van Nieuwenhuyze
- Annemieke Fokke
- Cécile Vinke
- Jeannette Lewin
- Carina Benninga (C)
- Daniëlle Koenen
- Ingrid Wolff
- Mieketine Wouters
- Martine Ohr
- Florentine Steenberghe
- Noor Holsboer
- Helen van der Ben
- Wietske de Ruiter
- Carole Thate

Group play

Teams	Pld	W	D	L	GF	GA	GD	Pts
South Korea	3	2	0	1	8	3	+5	4
Great Britain	3	2	0	1	7	5	+2	4
Netherlands	3	2	0	1	4	3	+1	4
New Zealand	3	0	0	3	2	10	–8	0

27 July 1992
20:00

Netherlands	2 – 1	Great Britain
van der Ben 33' de Ruiter 56'	Report

Umpires:
Peri Buckley (AUS)
Virginia Laje Davilla (ESP)

29 July 1992
20:00

Netherlands	2 – 0	New Zealand
van der Ben 12', 28'	Report

Umpires:
Margaret Louise Lanning (CAN)
Renee Chatas (USA)

2 August 1992
16:00

South Korea	2 – 0	Netherlands
Lee Kyoung-Hei 8'; Yang Hea-Sook 41'	Report

Umpires:
Peri Buckley (AUS)
Maria Salobrar Hernandez (ESP)

Fifth to eighth place classification

4 August 1992
17:30

Netherlands	2 – 0	Canada
van der Ben 55'; Steenberghe 61'	Report

Umpires:
Virginia Laje Davilla (ESP)
Gill Clarke (GBR)

Fifth and sixth place

6 August 1992
17:30

Australia	2 – 0	Netherlands
Powell 49'; Annan 50'	Report

Umpires:
Jane Robertson (GBR)
Margaret Louise Lanning (CAN)

== Rowing ==
Rowing events, finishes, and competitors:

Men

Athlete	Event	Quarterfinal		Repechage		Semifinal		Final	
Athlete	Event	Time	Rank	Time	Rank	Time	Rank	Time	Rank
Frans Göbel	Single sculls	7:17.75	6 R	7:09.98	3 SC/D	7:09.72	2 FC	7:12.76	16
Henk-Jan Zwolle; Nico Rienks	Men's double sculls	6:31.90	1 SA/B	Bye		6:19.15	2 FA	6:22.82	3rd place, bronze medalist(s)
Sjors van Iwaarden; Kai Compagner	Men's coxless pair	6:42.91	2 R	6:46.43	1 SA/B	6:39.85	5 FB	6:37.22	8
Hans Keldermann; Ronald Florijn; Koos Maasdijk; Rutger Arisz	Men's quadruple sculls	5:49.39	2 SA/B	Bye		5:50.12	3 FA	5:48.92	5
Bart Peters; Niels van der Zwan; Jaap Krijtenburg; Sven Schwarz	Men's coxless four	6:01.19	2 SA/B	Bye		6:00.55	3 FA	5:59.14	5

Women

Athlete	Event	Quarterfinal		Repechage		Semifinal		Final	
Athlete	Event	Time	Rank	Time	Rank	Time	Rank	Time	Rank
Irene Eijs	Women's single sculls	7:52.13	3 SA/B	Bye		7:40.44	1 FB	8:09.62	8
Rita de Jong; Marie-José de Groot	Women's double sculls	7:23.59	3 SA/B	Bye		7:14.90	5 FB	7:10.62	10
Laurien Vermulst; Marjan Pentenga; Anita Meiland; Harriet van Ettekoven	Women's quadruple sculls	6:33.84	3 R	6:34.78	2 FA	—N/a		6:32.40	4

Qualification Legend: FA=Final A (medal); FB=Final B (non-medal); FC=Final C (non-medal); FD=Final D (non-medal); SA/B=Semifinals A/B; SC/D=Semifinals C/D; SE/F=Semifinals E/F; QF=Quarterfinals; R=Repechage

== Sailing ==
Men

Athlete	Event	Race										Net points	Final rank
Athlete	Event	1	2	3	4	5	6	7	8	9	10	Net points	Final rank
Stephan van den Berg	Men's Lechner A-390	13	20	19	~~51~~	18	17	5.7	0	0	25	117.70	7
Ben Kouwenhoven; Jan Kouwenhoven	'Men's 470	20	~~44~~	31	15	25	36	5.7	—N/a			132.70	16

Women

Athlete	Event	Race										Net points	Final rank
Athlete	Event	1	2	3	4	5	6	7	8	9	10	Net points	Final rank
Dorien de Vries	Women's Lechner A-390	10	3	8	8	13	10	8	5.7	3	~~31~~	68.7	Bronze

== Swimming ==
Men

Athlete	Event	Heat		Final	
Athlete	Event	Time	Rank	Time	Rank
Marcel Wouda	400m freestyle	3:55.70	18	did not advance	
Marcel Wouda	200m individual medley	2:05.95	22	did not advance	
Marcel Wouda	400m individual medley	4:28.51	19	did not advance	

Women

Athlete	Event	Heat		Final	
Athlete	Event	Time	Rank	Time	Rank
Inge de Bruijn	50m freestyle	25.86	3	25.84	8
Inge de Bruijn	100m butterfly	1:01.12	4	did not advance	
Karin Brienesse	100m freestyle	55.98	2	56.59	8
Karin Brienesse	100m butterfly	1:01.33	5	did not advance	
Kira Bulten	100m breaststroke	1:11.81	11	did not advance	
Kira Bulten	200m breaststroke	2:37.09	26	did not advance	
Ellen Elzerman	100m backstroke	1:03.96	17	did not advance	
Ellen Elzerman	200m backstroke	2:17.34	22	did not advance	
Martine Janssen	100m breaststroke	1:15.10	15	did not advance	
Martine Janssen	200m breaststroke	2:41.48	31	did not advance	
Marianne Muis	50m freestyle	26.43	11	did not advance	
Mildred Muis	100m freestyle	56.67	13	did not advance	
Mildred Muis	200m individual medley	2:19.10	19	did not advance	
Diana van der Plaats	200m freestyle	2:05.42	26	did not advance	
Diana van der Plaats; Mildred Muis; Marianne Muis; Karin Brienesse; Inge de Bruijn*	4 × 100 m freestyle relay	3:44.00	2	3:43.74	5
Ellen Elzerman; Kira Bulten; Inge de Bruijn; Marianne Muis	4 × 100 m medley relay	4:11.25	3	4:10.87	8

== Synchronized swimming ==
Three synchronized swimmers represented the Netherlands in 1992.

Athlete	Event	Qualification						Final			
Athlete	Event	Technical figures		Free swim		Total		Free swim		Total	
Athlete	Event	Score	Rank	Score	Rank	Score	Rank	Score	Rank	Score	Rank
Marjolijn Both	Solo	85.834	6	93.08	10	178.914	8 Q	93.52	7	179.354	8
Marjolijn Both; Tamara Zwart	Duet	85.425	6	92.56	10	177.985	7 Q	93.92	7	179.345	7

== Tennis ==
Men

Athlete	Event	First round	Second round	Third round	Quarterfinal	Semifinal	Final	
Athlete	Event	Opposition Result	Opposition Result	Opposition Result	Opposition Result	Opposition Result	Opposition Result	Rank
Paul Haarhuis	Singles	Mattar (BRA); W 4-6, 6-3, 6-2, 6-2	Ivanišević (CRO); L 7-6, 2-6, 6-1, 3-6, 2-6	Did not advance				
Mark Koevermans	Singles	Noszály (HUN); W 6-2, 6-3, 2-6, 6-2	Bruguera (ESP); W 1-6, 6-3, 6-3, 6-2	Oncins (BRA); L 6-7, 0-6, 6-7	Did not advance			
Jan Siemerink	Singles	Lavalle (MEX); L 4-6, 4-6, 2-6	Did not advance					
Paul Haarhuis; Mark Koevermans	Doubles	—N/a	Ivanišević / Prpić (CRO); L 6-2, 4-6, 2-6, 2-6	Did not advance				

Women

Athlete	Event	First round	Second round	Third round	Quarterfinal	Semifinal	Final	
Athlete	Event	Opposition Result	Opposition Result	Opposition Result	Opposition Result	Opposition Result	Opposition Result	Rank
Nicole Muns-Jagerman	Singles	Kim (KOR); W 6-4, 6-4	Halard (FRA); W 7-6, 7-6	Huber (GER); L 5-7, 6-7	Did not advance			

== Volleyball ==
Summary

Team	Event	Preliminary round						Quarterfinal	Semifinal	Final / BM	
Team	Event	Opposition Result	Opposition Result	Opposition Result	Opposition Result	Opposition Result	Rank	Opposition Result	Opposition Result	Opposition Result	Rank
Netherlands men	Men's tournament	Cuba; L 1–3	South Korea; W 3-0	Brazil; L 0–3	Algeria; W 3-0	Unified Team; L 1–3	4	Italy; W 3-2	Cuba; W 3–0	Brazil; L 0–3	2nd place, silver medalist(s)
Netherlands women	Women's tournament	Brazil; L 1–3	China; W 3–2	Cuba; L 0–3	—N/a		3	United States; L 1–3	Did not advance	5th place match Japan; L 1–3	6

=== Men's team competition ===
- Team roster

- Edwin Benne
- Peter Blangé
- Ron Boudrie
- Henk-Jan Held
- Martin van der Horst
- Marko Klok
- Olof van der Meulen
- Jan Posthuma
- Avital Selinger
- Martin Teffer
- Ronald Zoodsma
- Ron Zwerver

- Head coach: Arie Selinger

=== Women's team competition ===
- Team roster

- Cintha Boersma
- Erna Brinkman
- Heleen Crielaard
- Kirsten Gleis
- Aafke Hament
- Marjolein de Jong
- Vera Koenen
- Irena Machovcak
- Linda Moons
- Henriëtte Weersing
- Sandra Wiegers

- Head coach: Peter Murphy

== Water polo ==
Men's team competition

- Preliminary round (group B)

- Lost to Spain (6-12)
- Lost to Italy (4-6)
- Drew with Greece (4-4)
- Lost to Cuba (9-11)
- Drew with Hungary (13-13)

- Classification Round (Group E)

- Defeated Czechoslovakia (9-8)
- Defeated France (15-8) → 9th place

- Team roster

- ( 1.) Arie van de Bunt
- ( 2.) Marc van Belkum
- ( 3.) Gijs van der Leden
- ( 4.) Harry van der Meer
- ( 5.) John Scherrenburg
- ( 6.) Hans Nieuwenburg
- ( 7.) Koos Issard
- ( 8.) Jalo de Vries
- ( 9.) John Jansen
- (10.) Robert Havekotte
- (11.) Jan Wagenaar
- (12.) Remco Pielstroom
- (13.) Bert Brinkman
