= Volleyball at the 1992 Summer Olympics – Women's team rosters =

This article show all participating team squads at the Women's Olympic Volleyball Tournament at the 1992 Summer Olympics in Barcelona, Spain.

== Group A ==
=== Spain ===
- Head Coach: Jaime Fernández Barros

#	Name	Date of Birth	Height	Weight	Spike	Block
1	Virginia Cardona
2	Ana María Tostado
3	Rita María Oraá
4	Inmaculada Torres
5	Laura de la Torre
6	Marta Gens
7	Olga Martín
8	Asunción Domenech
9	Inmaculada González
10	Estela Domínguez
11	María del Mar Rey
14	Carmen Beatriz Miranda
15	Olga Martín Rubio

=== Unified Team ===
- Head Coach: Nikolay Karpol

#	Name	Date of Birth	Height	Weight	Spike	Block
1	Valentina Ogienko		182
2	Natalya Morozova			188
3	Marina Nikulina
4	Elena Batukhtina		184	80
5	Irina Smirnova		186
6	Tatyana Sidorenko		186
7	Tatyana Menchova		186
8	Evgenya Artamonova		191
9	Galina Lebedeva
10	Svetlana Vassilevskaya
11	Elena Chebukina		188
13	Svetlana Korytova

=== Japan ===
- Head Coach: Kazunori Yoneda

#	Name	Date of Birth	Height	Weight	Spike	Block
1	Ichiko Sato
2	Kumi Nakada	03.09.1965
3	Michiyo Ishikake
4	Chieko Nakanishi
5	Motoko Obayashi
6	Yukiko Takahashi
7	Ikuyo Namura
8	Mika Yamauchi	07.10.1969
9	Asako Tajimi
10	Tomoko Yoshihara
11	Kiyoko Fukuda
12	Kazumi Nakamura

=== United States ===
- Head Coach: Terry Liskevych

#	Name	Date of Birth	Height	Weight	Spike	Block
1	Tonya Sanders	28.03.1968
2	Yoko Zetterlund	24.03.1969
4	Kim Oden	16.05.1964
5	Lori Endicott	01.08.1967
6	Paula Weishoff	01.05.1962
7	Caren Kemner	16.04.1965
8	Tammy Webb-Liley	06.03.1965
9	Elaina Oden	21.03.1967
12	Janet Cobbs	22.02.1967
13	Tara Cross-Battle	16.09.1968
14	Liane Sato	09.09.1964
15	Ruth Lawanson	27.09.1963

== Group B ==
=== Brazil ===
- Head Coach: Wadson Lima

#	Name	Date of Birth	Height	Weight	Spike	Block
2	Ana Moser	14.08.1968	185	70
3	Hilma Caldeira	05.01.1972	182
4	Ana Ida Alvares	22.01.1965	178
5	Ana Paula Connelly	13.02.1972	183
7	Cristina Lopes	29.01.1966
8	Leila Barros	30.09.1971	179
9	Cilene Rocha	19.06.1967	182	66	300	287
11	Ana Lúcia Barros	16.12.1965	176	71
12	Marcia Cunha	26.07.1969	185
13	Ana Flavia Daniel	20.06.1970	187
14	Fernanda Venturini	24.10.1970	181
15	Hélia Souza "Fofão"	10.03.1970	173

=== China ===
- Head Coach: Hu Jin

#	Name	Date of Birth	Height	Weight	Spike	Block
1	Lai Yawen
2	Li Guojun
4	Zhou Hong
5	Ma Fang
6	Wang Yi
7	Su Huijuan	03.04.1964
8	Chen Fengqin
9	Su Liqun
11	Sun Yue
12	Wu Dan
14	Gao Lin
15	Li Yueming

=== Cuba ===
- Head Coach: Eugenio George Lafita

#	Name	Date of Birth	Height	Weight	Spike	Block
1	Tania Ortiz	10.30.1965
2	Marlenys Costa	07.30.1973
3	Mireya Luis (c)	08.25.1967	175
4	Lilia Izquierdo	02.20.1967
5	Idalmis Gato	08.30.1971	178
6	Raisa O'Farril	04.17.1972	176
8	Regla Bell	07.06.1970	180
10	Regla Torres	02.12.1975	191
12	Norka Latamblet	08.25.1962
13	Mercedes Calderón	09.01.1965
14	Ana Ibis Fernandez	08.03.1973	183
15	Magalys Carvajal	12.18.1968	190

=== Netherlands ===
- Head Coach: Peter Murphy

#	Name	Date of Birth	Height	Weight	Spike	Block
1	Marrit Leenstra	18.10.1973
2	Sandra Wiegers
4	Erna Brinkman	25.03.1972
5	Cintha Boersma	01.05.1969
6	Vera Koenen
7	Irena Machovcak	13.11.1968
8	Aafke Hament
9	Marjolein de Jong	16.05.1968
10	Henriëtte Weersing	11.10.1965
12	Kirsten Gleis
13	Heleen Crielaard
15	Linda Moons
