= 2005 FIVB World Grand Prix squads =

This article show all participating team squads at the 2005 FIVB Women's Volleyball World Grand Prix, played by twelve countries from June 24 to July 18, 2005 with the final round held in Sendai, Japan.

== Brazil ==
- Head Coach: José Roberto Guimarães

#	Name	Date of Birth	Height	Weight	Spike	Block
2	Raquel Silva	30.04.1978	191	69	300	282
3	Sheilla Castro	01.07.1983	185	64	302	284
4	Paula Pequeno	22.01.1982	184	74	302	285
5	Caroline Gattaz	27.07.1981	191	87	304	280
6	Katia Rodrigues	17.05.1979	182	64	304	290
8	Valeska Menezes (c)	23.04.1976	180	62	302	290
9	Carolina Albuquerque	25.07.1977	182	76	289	279
10	Welissa Gonzaga	09.09.1982	179	76	300	287
11	Marcelle Moraes	17.10.1976	181	72	303	289
12	Jaqueline Carvalho	31.12.1983	186	70	302	286
14	Fabiana de Oliveira	07.03.1980	169	59	276	266
17	Renata Colombo	25.02.1981	181	78	305	293

== China ==
- Head Coach: Chen Zhonghe

#	Name	Date of Birth	Height	Weight	Spike	Block
1	Wang Yimei	11.01.1988	190	90	318	205
2	Feng Kun (c)	28.12.1978	183	75	319	310
3	Yang Hao	21.03.1980	183	75	319	314
4	Liu Yanan	29.09.1980	186	73	320	313
5	Chu Jinling	29.07.1984	190	72	310	302
6	Wang Keke	04.12.1983	188	78	315	308
7	Zhou Suhong	23.04.1979	182	75	313	305
10	Xue Ming	23.02.1987	193	68	322	310
11	Zhao Yun	15.09.1981	178	60	310	305
13	Wang Ting	09.11.1984	187	68	315	305
15	Ma Yunwen	19.10.1986	189	70	315	307
16	Zhang Na	19.04.1980	180	72	302	292
18	Zhang Ping	23.03.1982	187	73	312	301

== Cuba ==
- Head Coach: Luis Felipe Calderón

#	Name	Date of Birth	Height	Weight	Spike	Block
1	Yumilka Ruiz (c)	08.05.1978	179	62	329	315
2	Yanelis Santos	30.03.1986	183	71	315	312
3	Nancy Carrillo de la Paz	11.01.1986	190	74	318	315
5	Maybelis Martínez Adlum	13.06.1977	182	79	322	306
6	Daimí Ramírez Echevarría	08.10.1983	176	67	305	290
8	Yaima Ortiz Charro	09.11.1981	179	70	325	313
9	Rachel Sánchez	09.01.1989	188	75	325	320
11	Liana Mesa Luaces	26.12.1977	179	70	318	307
12	Rosir Calderón Díaz	28.12.1984	191	66	330	325
14	Kenia Carcaces	22.01.1986	188	69	308	306
18	Zoila Barros	06.08.1976	188	76	325	312

== Dominican Republic ==
- Head Coach: Francisco Cruz Jimenez

#	Name	Date of Birth	Height	Weight	Spike	Block
1	Annerys Vargas	07.08.1982	191	70	303	298
3	Yudelkys Bautista	05.12.1974	193	68	312	308
4	Dahiana Burgos	07.04.1985	188	58	312	302
5	Evelyn Carrera	05.10.1971	182	70	301	297
7	Sofía Mercedes (c)	25.05.1976	185	70	306	298
11	Juana Miguelina González	03.01.1979	185	70	295	290
12	Karla Echenique	16.05.1986	181	62	279	273
13	Cindy Rondón	12.11.1988	189	61	312	305
14	Prisilla Rivera	29.12.1986	183	67	309	305
15	Cosiri Rodríguez	30.08.1977	191	72	313	305
16	Kenya Moreta	07.04.1981	191	76	310	305
17	Sidarka de los Milagros	25.06.1984	188	58	312	308

== Germany ==
- Head Coach: Lee Hee-Wan

#	Name	Date of Birth	Height	Weight	Spike	Block
1	Andrea Berg	24.01.1981	188	71	306	299
2	Kathleen Weiß	02.02.1984	171	66	290	273
3	Nadja Jenzewski	02.04.1986	174	70	299	285
4	Kerstin Tzscherlich	15.02.1978	179	75	295	282
6	Julia Schlecht	16.03.1980	182	67	298	277
7	Christin Gühr	16.03.1982	184	70	315	299
8	Cornelia Dumler (c)	22.01.1982	181	69	309	285
11	Christiane Fürst	29.03.1985	192	74	305	291
12	Olessya Kulakova	31.01.1977	190	70	315	298
14	Kathy Radzuweit	02.03.1982	196	72	319	300
17	Birgit Thumm	03.07.1980	184	70	310	289
18	Corina Ssuschke	09.05.1983	188	70	304	292

== Italy ==
- Head Coach: Marco Bonitta

#	Name	Date of Birth	Height	Weight	Spike	Block
2	Natalia Viganò	24.11.1979	178	65	298	274
3	Elisa Cella	04.06.1982	186	72	304	286
5	Sara Anzanello	30.07.1980	193	78	316	298
6	Valentina Fiorin	09.10.1984	187	69	305	287
7	Martina Guiggi	01.05.1984	183	69	315	290
11	Serena Ortolani	07.01.1987	187	63	308	288
13	Cristina Vincenzi	14.05.1979	184	73	313	282
14	Eleonora Lo Bianco (c)	22.12.1979	172	70	287	273
15	Antonella Del Core	05.11.1980	180	73	296	279
16	Francesca Ferretti	15.02.1984	180	70	296	280
17	Chiara Arcangeli	14.02.1983	165	57	278	262

== Japan ==
- Head Coach: Shoichi Yanagimoto

#	Name	Date of Birth	Height	Weight	Spike	Block
2	Yuka Sakurai
3	Yoshie Takeshita (c)	18.03.1978	159	55	280	270
5	Miyuki Takahashi	25.12.1978	170	68	285	280
6	Kaoru Sugayama	26.12.1978	169	57	293	269
7	Makiko Horai	06.01.1979	187	68	312	300
8	Ayako Onuma	17.04.1979	180	72	302	297
9	Sachiko Sugiyama	19.10.1979	184	69	310	305
11	Megumi Itabashi	07.06.1973	166	60	281	272
12	Ai Otomo	24.03.1982	183	70	312	305
13	Miki Shimada	29.03.1983	185	70	298	293
14	Chie Yoshizawa	09.07.1983	172	65	295	288
16	Erika Araki

== South Korea ==
- Head Coach: Kim Hyung-sil

#	Name	Date of Birth	Height	Weight	Spike	Block
2	Han Yoo-mi	05.02.1982	180	65	307	297
4	Ji Jung-hee	18.03.1985	180	68	305	296
6	Choi Kwang-hee (c)	25.05.1974	173	73	304	289
8	Hwang Youn-joo	13.08.1986	177	68	303	294
9	Park Kyong-nang	05.01.1984	177	68	280	270
10	Lee Sook-ja	17.06.1980	175	60	286	264
13	Jung Dae-young	12.08.1981	183	71	303	292
14	Han Song-yi	05.09.1984	186	69	305	298
15	Kim Se-young	04.06.1981	190	71	309	300
16	Koo Ki-lan	10.03.1977	170	64	274	264
18	Yoon Su-hyun	08.06.1983	177	67	275	270

== Netherlands ==
- Head Coach: Avital Selinger

#	Name	Date of birth	Height	Weight	Spike	Block
1	Kim Staelens	07.01.1982	182	78	305	301
4	Chaïne Staelens	07.11.1980	194	77	316	299
5	Janneke van Tienen	29.05.1979	176	73	293	273
7	Elke Wijnhoven	03.01.1981	168	62	293	282
8	Alice Blom	07.04.1980	178	64	305	270
9	Floortje Meijners	16.01.1987	189	79	309	283
12	Manon Flier	08.02.1984	191	65	311	301
14	Riëtte Fledderus	18.10.1977	171	75	288	268
15	Ingrid Visser (c)	04.06.1977	191	75	312	292
16	Debby Stam	24.07.1984	184	70	303	281
18	Caroline Wensink	04.08.1984	186	76	309	281

== Poland ==
- Head Coach: Andrzej Niemczyk

#	Name	Date of Birth	Height	Weight	Spike	Block
1	Katarzyna Skowrońska	30.06.1983	189	75	314	296
2	Mariola Zenik	03.07.1982	175	65	300	290
4	Izabela Bełcik	29.11.1980	185	65	304	292
9	Agata Mroz	07.04.1982	191	74	312	301
10	Joanna Mirek	17.02.1977	186	69	314	306
11	Sylwia Pycia	20.04.1981	190	75	309	302
12	Natalia Bamber	24.02.1982	187	66	311	288
13	Milena Rosner	04.01.1980	180	65	307	292
14	Maria Liktoras	20.02.1975	191	73	312	302
15	Katarzyna Skorupa	16.09.1984	183	72	301	291
16	Aleksandra Przybysz (c)	02.06.1980	180	70	308	291
18	Joanna Kaczor	16.09.1984	188	64	305	290

== Thailand ==
- Head Coach: Sutchai Chanbunchee

#	Name	Date of Birth	Height	Weight	Spike	Block
1	Rattanaporn Sanuanram	09.04.1980	180	66	308	297
3	Saymai Paladsrichuay	04.08.1987	180	74	308	291
4	Nurak Nokputta	31.01.1981	178	63	295	280
5	Pleumjit Thinkaow	09.11.1983	180	63	298	281
9	Piyamas Koijapo	23.10.1978	178	67	298	282
10	Wilavan Apinyapong	06.06.1984	174	68	294	282
11	Amporn Hyapha	19.05.1985	180	70	301	290
13	Nootsara Tomkom	07.07.1985	169	57	289	278
14	Patcharee Sangmuang (c)	20.03.1978	181	66	294	279
16	Khwanjira Yuttagai	01.09.1986	178	60	287	277
17	Wanna Buakaew	02.01.1981	172	54	292	277

== United States ==
- Head Coach: Lang Ping

#	Name	Date of Birth	Height	Weight	Spike	Block
2	Jane Collymore	30.09.1984	182	68	315	289
3	Tayyiba Haneef	23.03.1979	201	80	318	299
4	Lindsey Berg	16.07.1980	173	81	285	270
6	Elisabeth Bachman	07.11.1978	193	88	319	299
8	Kristin Richards	30.06.1985	182	61	300	284
11	Robyn Ah Mow (c)	15.09.1975	172	68	291	281
12	Nancy Metcalf	12.11.1978	186	73	314	292
13	Elisha Thomas	20.07.1981	191	75	321	299
15	Nicole Davis	24.04.1982	167	73	284	266
17	Jennifer Joines	23.11.1982	191	82	315	301
18	Shonda Cole	21.06.1985	185	76	—	—
