= Inmaculada =

Inmaculada is a Spanish feminine given name. It originates from immaculate in Spanish. Inma is a common nickname for Inmaculada. Notable people with the name include:

== Politicians ==
- Inmaculada Bañuls (born 1963), Spanish teacher and politician
- Inmaculada Cruz (1960–2013), Spanish politician
- Inmaculada Guaita Vañó (born 1965), Spanish politician
- Inmaculada Hernández (born 1976), Spanish politician
- Inmaculada Martínez Cervera (born 1971), Spanish politician
- Inmaculada Nieto (born 1971), Spanish politician
- Inmaculada Rodríguez-Piñero (born 1958), Spanish politician
- María Inmaculada Sanz Otero (born 1977), Spanish politician

== Sportswomen ==
- Inmaculada Concepción Martínez Bernat (born 1972), Spanish tennis player
- Camil Inmaculada Domínguez Martínez (born 1991), Dominican Republic politician
- María Inmaculada Gabarro Romero (born 2002), Spanish footballer
- Inmaculada Castañón (born 1959), Spanish footballer
- Inmaculada González (born 1970), Spanish volleyball player
- Inmaculada Torres (born 1971), Spanish volleyball player
- Inmaculada Varas (born 1964), Spanish tennis player
- Inmaculada Vicent (born 1967), Spanish judoka

== Other ==
- Carmen Inmaculada Ruiz (1961–2023), Spanish-born American model and singer
- Inmaculada Casal (born 1964), Spanish journalist and television producer
- Inmaculada Martinez-Zarzoso, Spanish economist
- María Inmaculada Paz-Andrade (1928–2022), Spanish physicist and researcher

== See also ==
- Colegio de la Inmaculada (disambiguation)
- Inmaculada Concepción (disambiguation)
