= Netherlands women's national volleyball team =

Women's national volleyball team representing the Netherlands

Netherlands
- Association: Nederlandse Volleybalbond
- Confederation: CEV
- Head coach: Felix Koslowski
- FIVB ranking: 10 ▼2 (2 October 2026)

Uniforms
| Home | Away |

Summer Olympics
- Appearances: 4 (First in 1992)
- Best result: 4th place (2016)

World Championship
- Appearances: 16 (First in 1956)
- Best result: 4th place (2018)

World Cup
- Appearances: 2 (First in 1995)
- Best result: 8th place (1995, 2019)

European Championship
- Appearances: 31 (First in 1949)
- Best result: (gold) (1995)
- www.volleybal.nl (in Dutch)
Honours
Representing NED
World Grand Prix
| Gold medal – first place | 2007 Ningbo |
| Bronze medal – third place | 2016 Bangkok |
European Championship
| Gold medal – first place | 1995 Netherlands |
| Silver medal – second place | 1991 Italy |
| Silver medal – second place | 2009 Poland |
| Silver medal – second place | 2015 Netherlands/Belgium |
| Silver medal – second place | 2017 Azerbaijan/Georgia |
| Bronze medal – third place | 1985 Netherlands |
| Bronze medal – third place | 2023 Belgium / Italy / Germany / Estonia |
Montreux Volley Masters
| Gold medal – first place | 1984 Coupe des Nations |
| Bronze medal – third place | 2007 Montreux Volley Masters |
| Bronze medal – third place | 2015 Montreux Volley Masters |

The Netherlands women's national volleyball team is the national volleyball team of the Netherlands. It is governed by the Nederlandse Volleybalbond (NeVoBo). Following the 1995 European Championship they hosted in Arnhem and finishing fifth at the 1996 Olympics, the Dutch have had moments of success amidst instability, such as the title of the 2007 FIVB World Grand Prix, and a return to the Olympic Games in 2016, where the Netherlands got to fourth place.

== Results ==
=== Summer Olympics ===
Fourth place

Summer Olympics record
| Year | Round | Position | Pld | W | L | SW | SL | Squad |
|---|---|---|---|---|---|---|---|---|
| (Japan) 1964 | did not qualify | | | | | | | |
| (Mexico) 1968 | did not qualify | | | | | | | |
| (West Germany) 1972 | did not qualify | | | | | | | |
| (Canada) 1976 | did not qualify | | | | | | | |
| (Soviet Union) 1980 | did not qualify | | | | | | | |
| (United States) 1984 | did not qualify | | | | | | | |
| (South Korea) 1988 | did not qualify | | | | | | | |
| (Spain) 1992 | 5th place match | 6th Place | 5 | 1 | 4 | 6 | 14 | Squad |
| (United States) 1996 | 5th–8th places | 5th Place | 8 | 5 | 3 | 17 | 12 | Squad |
| (Australia) 2000 | did not qualify | | | | | | | |
| (Greece) 2004 | did not qualify | | | | | | | |
| (China) 2008 | did not qualify | | | | | | | |
| (United Kingdom) 2012 | did not qualify | | | | | | | |
| (Brazil) 2016 | Semifinals | 4th Place | 8 | 5 | 3 | 19 | 14 | Squad |
| (Japan) 2020 | did not qualify | | | | | | | |
| (France) 2024 | Group stage | 10th Place | 3 | 0 | 3 | 3 | 9 | Squad |
| (United States) 2028 | to be determined | | | | | | | |
| (Australia) 2032 | to be determined | | | | | | | |
| Total | 0 Titles | 4/18 | 24 | 11 | 13 | 45 | 49 | — |

=== World Championship ===
Champions Runners-up Third place Fourth place

World Championship record
| Year | Round | Position | Pld | W | L | SW | SL | Squad |
|---|---|---|---|---|---|---|---|---|
| (Soviet Union) 1952 | did not enter | | | | | | | |
| (France) 1956 | Final round | 10th Place | 10 | 1 | 9 | 6 | 27 | —N/a |
| (Brazil) 1960 | did not enter | | | | | | | |
| (Soviet Union) 1962 | 9th–14th places | 12th Place | 7 | 2 | 5 | 8 | 15 | —N/a |
| (Japan) 1967 | did not enter | | | | | | | |
| (Bulgaria) 1970 | 9th–16th places | 15th Place | 9 | 1 | 8 | 5 | 25 | —N/a |
| (Mexico) 1974 | 13th–18th places | 16th Place | 11 | 4 | 7 | 15 | 23 | —N/a |
| (Soviet Union) 1978 | 17th–20th places | 17th Place | 9 | 4 | 5 | 15 | 17 | —N/a |
| (Peru) 1982 | 13th–16th places | 16th Place | 8 | 5 | 3 | 17 | 11 | —N/a |
| (Czechoslovakia) 1986 | did not qualify | | | | | | | |
| (China) 1990 | 9th–12th places | 9th Place | 6 | 3 | 3 | 11 | 10 | Squad |
| (Brazil) 1994 | Playoffs | 10th Place | 4 | 2 | 2 | 7 | 7 | Squad |
| (Japan) 1998 | 5th–8th place | 7th Place | 8 | 5 | 3 | 12 | 13 | Squad |
| (Germany) 2002 | Second round | 9th Place | 8 | 4 | 4 | 15 | 14 | Squad |
| (Japan) 2006 | 5th–8th place | 8th Place | 9 | 4 | 5 | 17 | 19 | Squad |
| (Japan) 2010 | 9th–12th places | 11th Place | 9 | 3 | 6 | 15 | 19 | Squad |
| (Italy) 2014 | Second round | 13th Place | 7 | 2 | 5 | 9 | 16 | Squad |
| (Japan) 2018 | Semifinals | 4th Place | 13 | 9 | 4 | 31 | 17 | Squad |
| (Netherlands) (Poland) 2022 | Second round | 12th place | 9 | 4 | 5 | 16 | 17 | Squad |
| (Thailand) 2025 | Quarterfinals | 6th place | 5 | 4 | 1 | 14 | 9 | Squad |
| (Canada) (United States) 2027 | to be determined | | | | | | | |
| (Philippines) 2029 | to be determined | | | | | | | |
| Total | 0 Titles | 16/22 | 132 | 57 | 75 | 210 | 259 | — |

=== World Cup ===
Champions Runners-up Third place Fourth place

World Cup record
| Year | Position | Pld | W | L | SW | SL | Squad |
|---|---|---|---|---|---|---|---|
| 1973-1993 | did not enter | | | | | | |
| (Japan) 1995 | 8th | 11 | 6 | 5 | 19 | 19 | Squad |
| 1999-2015 | did not enter | | | | | | |
| (Japan) 2019 | 8th | 11 | 5 | 6 | 21 | 19 | Squad |

=== European Games ===
Champions Runners-up Third place Fourth place

European Games record
| Year | Round | Position | Pld | W | L | SW | SL | Squad |
|---|---|---|---|---|---|---|---|---|
| (Azerbaijan) 2015 | Quarterfinals | 5th | 6 | 4 | 2 | 12 | 10 | Squad |

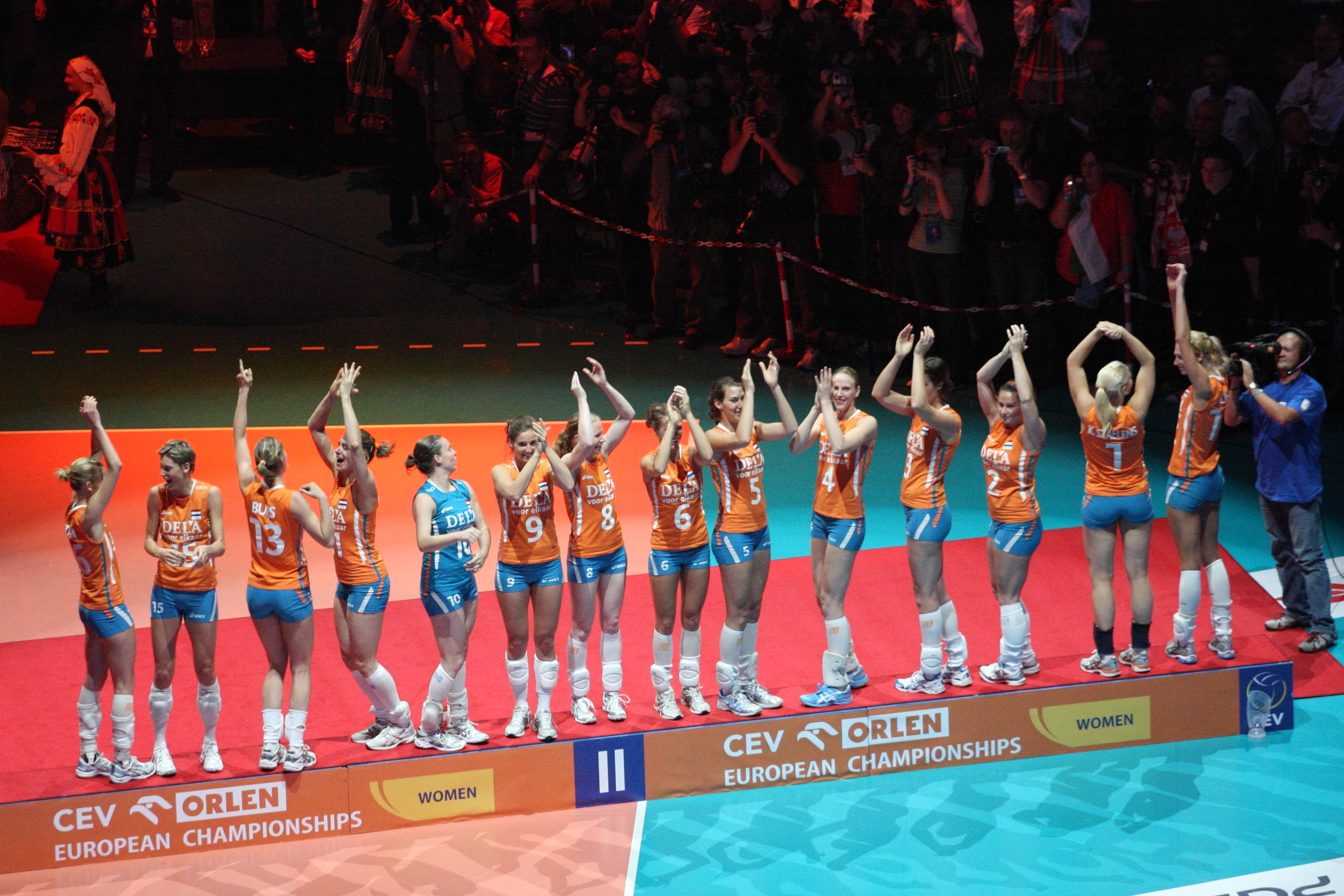
The Dutch team at the 2009 European Championship podium.

=== European Championship ===
Champions Runners-up Third place Fourth place

European Championship record
| Year | Round | Position | Pld | W | L | SW | SL | Squad |
|---|---|---|---|---|---|---|---|---|
| (Czechoslovakia) 1949 | Final Round | 7th Place | 6 | 0 | 6 | 0 | 18 | Squad |
| (Bulgaria) 1950 | did not enter | | | | | | | |
| (France) 1951 | | 5th Place | 3 | 1 | 2 | 3 | 8 | Squad |
| (Romania) 1955 | did not enter | | | | | | | |
| (Czechoslovakia) 1958 | | 10th Place | 5 | 2 | 3 | 9 | 9 | Squad |
| (Romania) 1963 | | 9th Place | 6 | 4 | 2 | 13 | 6 | Squad |
| (Turkey) 1967 | | 7th Place | 8 | 2 | 6 | 9 | 18 | Squad |
| (Italy) 1971 | | 9th Place | 7 | 4 | 3 | 13 | 11 | Squad |
| (Socialist Federal Republic of Yugoslavia) 1975 | | 11th Place | 7 | 2 | 5 | 7 | 18 | Squad |
| (Finland) 1977 | Preliminary Round | 10th Place | 7 | 1 | 6 | 7 | 20 | Squad |
| (France) 1979 | Final Round | 6th Place | 7 | 2 | 5 | 10 | 16 | Squad |
| (Bulgaria) 1981 | | 9th Place | 7 | 3 | 4 | 12 | 15 | Squad |
| (East Germany) 1983 | | 11th Place | 7 | 1 | 6 | 5 | 18 | Squad |
| (Netherlands) 1985 | Final Round | Third Place | 7 | 4 | 3 | 14 | 10 | Squad |
| (Belgium) 1987 | | 5th Place | 7 | 5 | 2 | 17 | 13 | Squad |
| (West Germany) 1989 | did not qualify | | | | | | | |
| (Italy) 1991 | Final | Runners Up | 7 | 5 | 2 | 17 | 7 | Squad |
| (Czech Republic) 1993 | | 7th Place | 7 | 4 | 3 | 17 | 14 | Squad |
| (Netherlands) 1995 | Final | Champions | 7 | 6 | 1 | 20 | 5 | Squad |
| (Czech Republic) 1997 | | 9th Place | 5 | 1 | 4 | 6 | 12 | Squad |
| (Italy) 1999 | | 5th Place | 5 | 3 | 2 | 10 | 9 | Squad |
| (Bulgaria) 2001 | | 5th Place | 7 | 4 | 3 | 16 | 15 | Squad |
| (Turkey) 2003 | Semifinals | 4th Place | 7 | 4 | 3 | 16 | 12 | Squad |
| (Croatia) 2005 | | 5th Place | 7 | 4 | 3 | 17 | 11 | Squad |
| (Belgium) / (Luxembourg) 2007 | | 5th Place | 6 | 4 | 2 | 15 | 7 | Squad |
| (Poland) 2009 | Final | Runners Up | 8 | 7 | 1 | 21 | 5 | Squad |
| (Italy) / (Serbia) 2011 | Quarterfinals | 7th Place | 5 | 3 | 2 | 11 | 7 | Squad |
| (Germany) / (Switzerland) 2013 | Playoffs | 9th Place | 4 | 1 | 3 | 9 | 9 | Squad |
| (Belgium) / (Netherlands) 2015 | Final | Runners Up | 6 | 5 | 1 | 15 | 5 | Squad |
| (Azerbaijan) / (Georgia (country)) 2017 | Final | Runners Up | 7 | 5 | 2 | 15 | 10 | Squad |
| (Hungary) / (Poland) / (Slovakia) / (Turkey) 2019 | Quarterfinals | 5th | 7 | 6 | 1 | 18 | 3 | Squad |
| (Romania) / (Croatia) / (Bulgaria) / (Serbia) 2021 | Semifinals | 4th | 9 | 6 | 3 | 19 | 11 | Squad |
| (Belgium) / (Italy) / (Germany) / (Estonia) 2023 | Semifinals | 3rd | 9 | 8 | 1 | 25 | 4 | Squad |
| (Azerbaijan) / (Czech Republic) / (Sweden) / (Turkey) 2026 | Quarterfinals | 5th | 7 | 5 | 2 | 18 | 11 | Squad |
| (N/A) / (N/A) / (N/A) / (Spain) 2028 | To be determined | | | | | | | |
| Total | 1 Title | 31/35 | 197 | 107 | 90 | 386 | 326 | — |

=== World Grand Prix ===
Champions Runners-up Third place Fourth place

World Grand Prix record
| Year | Round | Position | Pld | W | L | SW | SL | Squad |
|---|---|---|---|---|---|---|---|---|
| (Hong Kong) 1993 | did not enter | | | | | | | |
| (China) 1994 | First Round | 9th Place | 9 | 2 | 7 | 8 | 22 | Squad |
| (China) 1995 | did not enter | | | | | | | |
| (China) 1996 | First Round | 7th Place | 12 | 2 | 10 | 9 | 32 | Squad |
| (Japan) 1997 | First Round | 7th Place | 6 | 1 | 5 | 7 | 15 | Squad |
| (Hong Kong) 1998 | did not enter | | | | | | | |
| (China) 1999 | First Round | 8th Place | 6 | 1 | 5 | 7 | 17 | Squad |
| (Philippines) 2000 | did not qualify | | | | | | | |
| (Macau) 2001 | did not qualify | | | | | | | |
| (Hong Kong) 2002 | did not qualify | | | | | | | |
| (Italy) 2003 | Final round | 4th Place | 10 | 6 | 4 | 19 | 22 | Squad |
| (Italy) 2004 | did not qualify | | | | | | | |
| (Japan) 2005 | Final round | 6th Place | 14 | 6 | 8 | 24 | 26 | Squad |
| (Italy) 2006 | did not qualify | | | | | | | |
| (China) 2007 | Final round | Champions | 14 | 11 | 3 | 33 | 22 | Squad |
| (Japan) 2008 | did not qualify | | | | | | | |
| (Japan) 2009 | Final round | 4th Place | 14 | 9 | 5 | 32 | 20 | Squad |
| (China) 2010 | First round | 7th Place | 9 | 5 | 4 | 17 | 16 | Squad |
| (Macau) 2011 | did not qualify | | | | | | | |
| (China) 2012 | did not qualify | | | | | | | |
| (Japan) 2013 | First round | 12th Place | 9 | 4 | 5 | 14 | 15 | Squad |
| (Japan) 2014 | First round | 14th Place | 11 | 9 | 2 | 31 | 11 | Squad |
| (United States) 2015 | First round | 13th Place | 8 | 8 | 0 | 24 | 3 | Squad |
| (Thailand) 2016 | Semifinals | 3rd place | 13 | 7 | 6 | 23 | 24 | Squad |
| (China) 2017 | Final Round | 5th place | 9 | 6 | 5 | 26 | 19 | Squad |
| Total | 1 Title | 14/25 | 146 | 77 | 69 | 274 | 264 | — |

=== Nations League ===
Champions Runners-up Third place Fourth place

Nations League record
| Year | Round | Position | Pld | W | L | SW | SL | Squad |
|---|---|---|---|---|---|---|---|---|
| (China) 2018 | Final Round | 5th | 17 | 12 | 5 | 40 | 24 | Squad |
| (China) 2019 | Preliminary Round | 11th | 15 | 6 | 9 | 27 | 30 | Squad |
| (Italy) 2021 | Preliminary Round | 7th | 15 | 9 | 6 | 30 | 26 | Squad |
| (Turkey) 2022 | Preliminary Round | 11th | 12 | 4 | 8 | 20 | 28 | Squad |
| (United States) 2023 | Preliminary Round | 12th | 12 | 5 | 7 | 23 | 22 | Squad |
| (Thailand) 2024 | Preliminary Round | 9th | 12 | 7 | 5 | 24 | 18 | Squad |
| (Poland) 2025 | Preliminary Round | 10th | 12 | 5 | 7 | 19 | 27 | Squad |
| (Macau) 2026 | Quarterfinals | 8th | 13 | 7 | 6 | 24 | 18 | Squad |
| (N/A) 2027 | qualified | | | | | | | |
| Total | 0 Titles | 9/9 | 108 | 55 | 53 | 207 | 193 | — |

== Team ==
=== Current squad ===
Roster for the 2024 Summer Olympics. The roster was announced on 6 July 2024.

Head coach: (Germany) Felix Koslowski

- 4 Celeste Plak OP
- 5 Jolien Knollema OH
- 7 Juliët Lohuis MB
- 10 Sarah van Aalen S
- 11 Anne Buijs OH
- 12 Britt Bongaerts S
- 16 Indy Baijens MB
- 18 Marrit Jasper OH
- 19 Nika Daalderop (c) OH
- 23 Eline Timmerman MB
- 25 Florien Reesink L
- 26 Elles Dambrink OP

=== Managers ===
| Netherlands Team Managers | From | To |
|---|---|---|
| (Netherlands) Bert Goedkoop | 1993 | 1998 |
| (France) Pierre Mathieu | 1998 | 2000 |
| (Italy) Angelo Frigoni | 2001 | 2004 |
| (Netherlands) Avital Selinger | 2004 | 2012 |
| (Netherlands) Gido Vermeulen | 2012 | 2014 |
| (Italy) Giovanni Guidetti | 2015 | 2016 |
| (United States) Jamie Morrison | 2017 | 2019 |
| (Netherlands) Avital Selinger | 2020 | 2022 |
| (Germany) Felix Koslowski | 2023 | |

=== Notable players ===
In alphabetical order

- Alice Blom
- Cintha Boersma
- Erna Brinkman
- Heleen Crielaard
- Irina Donets
- Jolanda Elshof
- Riëtte Fledderus
- Jerine Fleurke
- Manon Flier
- Suzanne Freriks
- Petra Groenland
- Kirsten Gleis
- Aafke Hament
- Ruth Heerschap
- Saskia van Hintum
- Francien Huurman
- Carlijn Jans
- Marjolein de Jong
- Vera Koenen
- Marrit Leenstra
- Elles Leferink
- Hanneke van Leusden
- Irena Machovcak
- Floortje Meijners
- Linda Moons
- Mirjam Orsel
- Kitty Sanders
- Titia Sustring
- Maureen Staal
- Chaïne Staelens
- Kim Staelens
- Debby Stam
- Claudia van Thiel
- Janneke van Tienen
- Lisette van der Ven
- Ingrid Visser
- Sanna Visser
- Henriëtte Weersing
- Ruth van der Wel
- Caroline Wensink
- Sandra Wiegers
- Elke Wijnhoven
- Quinta Steenbergen
- Silvia Raaymakers

== See also ==
- Netherlands men's national volleyball team
