= Liaoning women's volleyball team =

Chinese volleyball team

Liaoning Donggang Strawberry Women's Volleyball Club
- Full name: Liaoning Donggang Strawberry Women's Volleyball Club 辽宁华君女子排球俱乐部
- Nickname: Liaoning Donggang Strawberry
- Ground: Bayuquan Hongyun Gymnasium (Capacity: 3,000)
- Manager: (China) Zhao Yong
- Captain: Ding Xia
- League: Chinese Volleyball Super League (CVL)
- 2024-25: 3rd

Uniforms
Home	Away

Liaoning Donggang Strawberry Women's Volleyball Club is a professional women's volleyball club based in Yingkou, Liaoning that plays in the Chinese Women's Volleyball Super League (CVL).

The team won their first champions title in season 2005–06.

== CVL results by Season ==
Season	Final ranking
2025-2026	12th
2024-2025	Third Place
2023-2024	7th
2022-2023	7th
2021-2022	4th
2020-2021	6th
2019-2020	6th
2018-2019	5th
2017-2018	4th
2016-2017	5th
2015-2016	5th
2014-2015	8th
2013-2014	6th
2012-2013	7th
2011-2012	6th
2010-2011	8th
2009-2010	6th
2008-2009	7th
2007-2008	4th
2006-2007	Runners-up
2005-2006	Champions
2004-2005	5th
2003-2004	Third Place
2002-2003	Third Place
2001-2002	Runners-up
2000-2001	Third Place

== Team roster ==
Season 2024–2025

2024–2025 Team
Number	Player	Position	Height (m)	Birth date
1	(Bulgaria) Gergana Kyoseva	Outside Hitter	1.84	1996/02/28
3	(China) Cheng Wen	Middle Blocker	2.04	2000/05/06
4	(China) Sun Xiaoxuan	Opposite	1.86	2000/02/18
5	(China) Shi Bingtong	Outside Hitter	1.89	1998/02/06
6	(China) Hu Mingyuan	Middle Blocker	1.87	1996/05/17
8	(China) Ding Xia (C)	Setter	1.80	1990/01/13
9	(Turkey) Ceyda Aktaş	Outside Hitter	1.91	1994/08/18
10	(China) Duan Fang	Outside Hitter	1.88	1994/12/26
11	(China) Zhang Shiqian	Outside Hitter	1.85	2004/09/19
12	(China) Zheng Mingyu	Setter	1.79	2002/10/19
15	(China) Zhang Shengnan	Libero	1.73	2004/11/28
18	(Slovenia) Evá Zatkovič	Opposite	1.92	2001/08/02
19	(China) Xu Jianan	Libero	1.68	1998/04/02
21	(Dominican Republic) Jineiry Martínez	Middle Blocker	1.92	1997/12/03

== Honours ==
=== International competitions ===
==== AVC Champions League ====
Third Place (1): 2023

=== Domestic competitions ===
==== Chinese Volleyball League / Chinese Volleyball Super League ====
Champions (1): 2005-06
Runners-up (2): 2001-02, 2006-07
Third Place (4): 2000-01, 2002-03, 2003-04, 2024-25

== Former players ==
- (China) Jiang Ying
- (China) Lai Yawen
- (China) Zhou Hong
- (China) Gao Lin
- (China) Chen Fengqin
- (China) Yang Hao
- (China) Liu Yanan
- (China) Zhang Yuehong
- (China) Chu Jinling
- (China) Wang Yimei
- (China) Li Xiang
- (China) Wang Wanying
- (China) Zhang Xian
