= Zarzoso =

Zarzoso is a Spanish surname. Notable people with the surname include:

- Inmaculada Martinez-Zarzoso, Spanish economist
- Juan José Nieto Zarzoso (born 1994), Spanish footballer
