= Ikuyo =

- Gender: Female

Origin
- Origin: Japanese
- Meaning: Different meanings depending on the kanji used

Ikuyo (written: 育代 or 郁代) is a feminine Japanese given name. Notable people with the name include:

- Ikuyo Fujita (藤田 育代), Japanese artist
- Ikuyo Namura (苗村 郁代; born 1969), Japanese volleyball player
- Ikuyo Shiotani (塩谷 育代; born 1962), Japanese professional golfer
- Ikuyo Tsukidate (築舘 郁代; born 1977), Japanese biathlete

== Fictional characters ==
- Ikuyo Ariina (有稲 幾夜), a character in the video game Fate/Extra
- Ikuyo Hoshizora (星空育代), a character in the anime series Smile PreCure!
- Ikuyo Suzuki (鈴木 イクヨ), a character in the manga series Hanaukyo Maid Team
- Ikuyo Kita (喜多 郁代), a character in the manga series Bocchi the Rock!
