= Sanna Visser =

Dutch volleyball player (born 1984)

Personal information
- Born: 2 May 1984 (age 42)
Medal record
Women's volleyball
Representing the Netherlands
FIVB World Grand Prix
Gold medal – first place	2007 Ningbo	Team Competition

Sanna Visser (born 2 May 1984 in Friesland) is a retired volleyball player from the Netherlands, who played in different positions. She was a member of the Dutch National Women's Team that won the gold medal at the FIVB World Grand Prix 2007 in Ningbo, China. After volleyball, Visser embarked on a corporate career.
