= Guhr =

Guhr or Gühr is a German language surname. It stems from a reduced form of the male given name Gregory – and may refer to:

- Carl Guhr (1787–1848), German violinist
- Christin Gühr (1982), German female volleyball player
- Richard Guhr (1873–1956), German sculptor and painter
