= Freriks =

Freriks is a Dutch surname. Notable people with this surname include:

- Merel Freriks (born 1998), Dutch handball player
- Nico Freriks (born 1981), Dutch volleyball player
- Philip Freriks (born 1944), Dutch journalist, columnist and television presenter
- Suzanne Freriks (born 1984), Dutch volleyball player
