= 1995 Women's European Volleyball Championship =

Tournament details
- Host country: Netherlands
- Dates: 23 September – 1 October
- Teams: 12
- Venue: Various (in 2 host cities)

Final positions
- Champions: Netherlands (1st title)

Tournament awards
- MVP: (Netherlands) Elles Leferink

The 1995 Women's European Volleyball Championship was the 19th edition of the event, organised by Europe's governing volleyball body, the Confédération Européenne de Volleyball. It was hosted in Arnhem and Groningen, Netherlands from 23 September to 1 October 1995. The two finalists qualified for the 1995 FIVB Women's World Cup.

== Participating teams ==
Team	Method of qualification
Belarus	1993 edition eighth place
Bulgaria	Qualification group A winners
Croatia	1993 edition sixth place
Czech Republic	1993 edition second place
Germany	1993 edition fifth place
Italy	1993 edition fourth place
Latvia	Qualification group B winners
Netherlands	Hosts
Poland	Qualification group D winners
Russia	1993 edition first place
Turkey	Qualification group C winners
Ukraine	1993 edition third place

== Format ==
The tournament was played in two different stages. In the first stage, the twelve participants were divided in two groups of six teams each. A single round-robin format was played within each group to determine the teams' group position. The second stage of the tournament consisted of two sets of semifinals to determine the tournament final ranking. The group stage firsts and seconds played the semifinals for 1st to 4th place, group stage thirds and fourths played the 5th to 8th place semifinals and the remaining four teams which finished group stages as fifth and sixth ended all tied in final ranking at 9th place. The pairing of the semifinals was made so teams played against the opposite group teams which finished in a different position (1st played against 2nd, 3rd played against 4th).

== Pools composition ==
Pool A	Pool B
Belarus	Bulgaria
Germany	Croatia
Latvia	Czech Republic
Poland	Italy
Russia	Netherlands
Ukraine	Turkey

== Venues ==
Pool A	Pool B and Final round	Tournament host cities
Groningen	Arnhem	Tournament host cities

== Preliminary round ==
- All times are Central European Summer Time (UTC+02:00).

=== Pool A ===
- venue location: Groningen, Netherlands

Pos	Team	Pld	W	L	Pts	SW	SL	SR	SPW	SPL	SPR	Qualification
1	Russia	5	5	0	10	15	0	MAX	227	121	1.876	Semifinals
2	Germany	5	4	1	9	12	6	2.000	228	180	1.267	Semifinals
3	Ukraine	5	3	2	8	10	10	1.000	255	237	1.076	5th–8th place
4	Belarus	5	2	3	7	8	10	0.800	207	218	0.950	5th–8th place
5	Poland	5	1	4	6	7	13	0.538	227	263	0.863	
6	Latvia	5	0	5	5	2	15	0.133	119	244	0.488	

Date	Time		Score		Set 1	Set 2	Set 3	Set 4	Set 5	Total	Report
23 Sep	14:00	Germany	3–1	Ukraine	15–6	14–16	15–8	15–10		59–40	Report
23 Sep	17:30	Belarus	3–1	Poland	15–6	15–8	12–15	15–12		57–41	Report
23 Sep	20:00	Russia	3–0	Latvia	15–5	15–4	15–1			45–10	Report
24 Sep	12:00	Germany	3–1	Belarus	12–15	15–11	15–6	15–4		57–36	Report
24 Sep	14:30	Ukraine	3–1	Latvia	15–9	15–3	14–16	15–5		59–33	Report
24 Sep	17:00	Poland	0–3	Russia	12–15	7–15	10–15			29–45	Report
25 Sep	15:00	Belarus	1–3	Ukraine	8–15	15–6	9–15	6–15		38–51	Report
25 Sep	17:30	Russia	3–0	Germany	15–5	15–4	15–5			45–14	Report
25 Sep	20:00	Latvia	1–3	Poland	2–15	9–15	15–4	14–16		40–50	Report
27 Sep	15:00	Belarus	0–3	Russia	12–15	7–15	12–15			31–45	Report
27 Sep	17:30	Germany	3–0	Latvia	15–9	15–1	15–2			45–12	Report
27 Sep	20:00	Ukraine	3–2	Poland	15–10	11–15	12–15	15–12	15–8	68–60	Report
28 Sep	15:00	Latvia	0–3	Belarus	5–15	13–15	6–15			24–45	Report
28 Sep	17:30	Poland	1–3	Germany	13–15	7–15	15–8	12–15		47–53	Report
28 Sep	20:00	Russia	3–0	Ukraine	17–15	15–12	15–10			47–37	Report

=== Pool B ===
- venue location: Arnhem, Netherlands

Pos	Team	Pld	W	L	Pts	SW	SL	SR	SPW	SPL	SPR	Qualification
1	Croatia	5	5	0	10	15	4	3.750	273	194	1.407	Semifinals
2	Netherlands	5	4	1	9	14	4	3.500	251	194	1.294	Semifinals
3	Bulgaria	5	3	2	8	11	7	1.571	232	183	1.268	5th–8th place
4	Italy	5	2	3	7	8	10	0.800	192	231	0.831	5th–8th place
5	Czech Republic	5	1	4	6	4	14	0.286	185	249	0.743	
6	Turkey	5	0	5	5	2	15	0.133	169	251	0.673	

Date	Time		Score		Set 1	Set 2	Set 3	Set 4	Set 5	Total	Report
23 Sep	15:00	Netherlands	3–1	Bulgaria	15–9	15–9	8–15	15–10		53–43	Report
23 Sep	17:30	Italy	3–1	Czech Republic	9–15	15–8	17–15	15–6		56–44	Report
23 Sep	20:00	Turkey	0–3	Croatia	10–15	6–15	10–15			26–45	Report
24 Sep	12:00	Netherlands	3–0	Italy	15–10	15–13	15–5			45–28	Report
24 Sep	14:30	Bulgaria	1–3	Croatia	9–15	8–15	15–12	11–15		43–57	Report
24 Sep	17:00	Czech Republic	3–2	Turkey	15–7	9–15	11–15	15–2	21–19	71–58	Report
25 Sep	15:00	Italy	1–3	Bulgaria	6–15	4–15	15–11	2–15		27–56	Report
25 Sep	17:30	Croatia	3–0	Czech Republic	15–11	15–5	15–10			45–26	Report
25 Sep	9:00	Turkey	0–3	Netherlands	11–15	7–15	12–15			30–45	Report
27 Sep	15:00	Bulgaria	3–0	Czech Republic	15–13	15–3	15–4			45–20	Report
27 Sep	17:30	Italy	3–0	Turkey	15–10	15–12	15–7			45–29	Report
27 Sep	20:00	Netherlands	2–3	Croatia	15–12	11–15	11–15	15–12	11–15	63–69	Report
28 Sep	15:00	Turkey	0–3	Bulgaria	13–15	10–15	3–15			26–45	Report
28 Sep	17:30	Croatia	3–1	Italy	15–6	12–15	15–8	15–7		57–36	Report
28 Sep	20:00	Czech Republic	0–3	Netherlands	7–15	4–15	13–15			24–45	Report

== Final round ==
- venue location: Arnhem, Netherlands
- All times are Central European Summer Time (UTC+02:00).

=== 5th–8th place ===
- Pools A and B third and fourth positions play each other.

Semifinals
30 Sep
Ukraine	1
Italy	3
30 Sep
Belarus	0
Bulgaria	3

5th place
1 Oct
Italy	2
Bulgaria	3
7th place
1 Oct
Ukraine	3
Belarus	0

==== 5th–8th semifinals ====
Date	Time		Score		Set 1	Set 2	Set 3	Set 4	Set 5	Total	Report
30 Sep	12:00	Ukraine	1–3	Italy	9–15	15–8	8–15	13–15		45–53	Report
30 Sep	17:00	Belarus	0–3	Bulgaria	11–15	7–15	13–15			31–45	Report

==== 7th place match ====
Date	Time		Score		Set 1	Set 2	Set 3	Set 4	Set 5	Total	Report
1 Oct	10:00	Ukraine	3–0	Belarus	16–14	15–10	15–8			46–32	Report

==== 5th place match ====
Date	Time		Score		Set 1	Set 2	Set 3	Set 4	Set 5	Total	Report
1 Oct	12:30	Bulgaria	3–2	Italy	10–15	15–9	15–5	4–15	15–8	59–52	Report

=== Final ===
- Pools A and B first and second positions play each other.

Semifinals
30 Sep
Russia	1
Netherlands	3
30 Sep
Germany	0
Croatia	3

Final
1 Oct
Netherlands	3
Croatia	0
3rd place
1 Oct
Russia	3
Germany	0

==== Semifinals ====
Date	Time		Score		Set 1	Set 2	Set 3	Set 4	Set 5	Total	Report
30 Sep	14:30	Russia	1–3	Netherlands	7–15	7–15	15–12	7–15		36–57	Report
30 Sep	20:00	Germany	0–3	Croatia	7–15	3–15	2–15			12–45	Report

==== 3rd place match ====
Date	Time		Score		Set 1	Set 2	Set 3	Set 4	Set 5	Total	Report
1 Oct	18:00	Russia	3–0	Germany	15–6	15–2	15–10			45–18	Report

==== Final ====
Date	Time		Score		Set 1	Set 2	Set 3	Set 4	Set 5	Total	Report
1 Oct	15:00	Netherlands	3–0	Croatia	15–7	15–13	15–2			45–22	Report

== Final ranking ==
Place	Team
1st place, gold medalist(s)	Netherlands
2nd place, silver medalist(s)	Croatia
3rd place, bronze medalist(s)	Russia
4.	Germany
5.	Bulgaria
6.	Italy
7.	Ukraine
8.	Belarus
9.	Poland
9.	Czech Republic
9.	Turkey
9.	Latvia

1995 Women's European champions

Netherlands
First title

Team roster
Cintha Boersma, Erna Brinkman, Marjolein de Jong, Jolanda Elshof, Riëtte Fledderus, Jerine Fleurke, Petra Groenland, Marrit Leenstra, Elles Leferink, Irena Machovcak, Ingrid Visser, Henriëtte Weersing.
Head coach: Bert Goedkoop.

- Netherlands and Croatia qualified for the 1995 FIVB Women's World Cup.

== Individual awards ==
- MVP: Elles Leferink (NED)
- Best spiker: Barbara Jelić (CRO)
- Best server: Barbara Jelić (CRO)
- Best blocker: Jerine Fleurke (NED)
- Best setter: Irina Kirillova (CRO)
- Best receiver: Cintha Boersma (NED)
- Best digger: Marjolein de Jong (NED)
