= Silvia Raaymakers =

Dutch volleyball player (born 1974)

Personal information
- Nationality: Dutch
- Born: 28 November 1974 (age 51)
- Height: 181 cm (5 ft 11 in)

Volleyball information
- Number: 15 (national team)

Career
| Years | Teams |
|---|---|
| 1994 | Bonduelle VVC |

National team
| 1994 | Netherlands |

Silvia Raaymakers (born 28 November 1974) is a retired Dutch volleyball player. She was part of the Netherlands women's national volleyball team.

She participated in the 1994 FIVB Volleyball Women's World Championship. On club level she played with Bonduelle VVC.

== Clubs ==
- Bonduelle VVC (1994)
