= Ji Jung-hee =

South Korean volleyball player (born 1981)

Personal information
- Nationality: South Korean
- Born: 18 March 1985 (age 41)
- Hometown: Daejeon
- Height: 180 cm (5 ft 11 in)
- Weight: 65 kg (143 lb)
- Spike: 305 cm (120 in)
- Block: 296 cm (117 in)

Volleyball information
- Number: 4

Career
Years	Teams
2005	Daejeon KGC

National team
2005-2007	South Korea

Ji Jung-hee (born 18 March 1985) is a South Korean female professional volleyball player. She was part of the South Korea women's national volleyball team.

She participated at the 2005 FIVB World Grand Prix, 2006 FIVB World Grand Prix, and 2007 FIVB World Grand Prix.

She played with Daejeon KGC.
