= Nanae Takizawa =

Japanese volleyball player

Personal information
- Full name: Takizawa Nanae
- Nickname: Nanae
- Born: September 22, 1987 (age 39); Mitaka, Tokyo, Japan
- Height: 1.66 m (5 ft 5 in)
- Weight: 52 kg (115 lb)
- Spike: 272 cm (8 ft 11 in)

Volleyball information
- Position: Libero
- Current club: Pioneer Red Wings
- Number: 25

Nanae Takizawa (滝沢ななえ; Takizawa Nanae, born September 22, 1987, in Mitaka, Tokyo) is a former Japanese volleyball player who played for Pioneer Red Wings.

Born in Mitaka, Tokyo, she studied at Hachioji Jissen High School (八王子実践高等学校) and was a member of the volleyball team with Marie Wada and Ayuka Hattori there. After finishing high school, she joined the volleyball team Pioneer Red Wings.

In November 2017, Takizawa came out as a lesbian when she told interviewers on a television program that she was dating a woman. She says that her friend had encouraged her, telling her that, with her fame, she could become the Ellen DeGeneres of Japan. Takizawa also felt that she should make use of her position to give more recognition to lesbians in Japan.
