= Ikumi Nishibori =

Japanese volleyball player (born 1981)

Personal information
- Nationality: Japanese
- Born: 20 August 1981 (age 45)
- Height: 1.68 m (5 ft 6 in)
- Spike: 290 cm (110 in)
- Block: 275 cm (108 in)

Volleyball information
- Number: 17

Ikumi Nishibori (Japanese: 西堀育実, born 20 August 1981) is a Japanese female volleyball player.

She played for the Japan women's national volleyball team, at the 2001 FIVB Women's World Grand Champions Cup.

On club level she played for the Pioneer Red Wings.
