= Mirjam Orsel =

Dutch volleyball player (born 1978)

Personal information
- Born: 1 April 1978 (age 48)
Medal record
Women's volleyball
Representing the Netherlands
FIVB World Grand Prix
Gold medal – first place	2007 Ningbo	Team competition

Mirjam Orsel (born 1 April 1978 in Amsterdam, North Holland) is a volleyball player from the Netherlands, who plays as a middle-blocker. She was a member of the Dutch National Women's Team that won the gold medal at the FIVB World Grand Prix 2007 in Ningbo, PR China.
