= Suzanne Freriks =

Dutch volleyball player (born 1984)

Personal information
- Born: September 16, 1984 (age 41)
Medal record
Women's volleyball
Representing the Netherlands
FIVB World Grand Prix
Gold medal – first place	2007 Ningbo	Team competition

Suzanne Freriks (born September 16, 1984 in Horst aan de Maas, Limburg) is a Dutch former a volleyball player whose role was a setter. She was a member of the Dutch National Women's Team that won the gold medal at the FIVB World Grand Prix 2007 in Ningbo, PR China.
