= Maureen Staal =

Dutch volleyball player (born 1982)

Personal information
- Born: 30 September 1982 (age 44)
- Height: 1.89 m (6 ft 2 in)
- Weight: 76 kg (168 lb)
- Spike: 305 cm (120 in)
- Block: 295 cm (116 in)

Volleyball information
- Position: Wing-spiker
- Current club: VVC
- Number: 17

National team
Netherlands
Honours
Women's volleyball

Maureen Staal (born 30 September 1982) is a volleyball player from the Netherlands.

== Career ==
She was a member of the Dutch National Women's Team. She participated at the 2002 FIVB Volleyball Women's World Championship.

== Clubs ==
- 2001 - 2003 VVC Vught
