= Carlijn Jans =

Dutch volleyball player

Personal information
- Nationality: Netherlands
- Born: 24 July 1987 (age 39); Breda, Netherlands
- Height: 1.92 m (6 ft 4 in)
- Weight: 77 kg (170 lb)
- Spike: 310 cm (122 in)
- Block: 301 cm (119 in)

Volleyball information
- Number: 17

Career
| Years | Teams |
|---|---|
| 2014 | (Netherlands) Alterno Apeldoorn |

Carlijn Jans (born 24 July 1987 in Breda) is a Dutch female volleyball player. She is a member of the Netherlands women's national volleyball team and played for Alterno Apeldoorn in 2014. She was part of the Dutch national team at the 2014 FIVB Volleyball Women's World Championship in Italy.

== Clubs ==
- (Netherlands) Alterno Apeldoorn (2014)
