= Claudia van Thiel =

Dutch volleyball player (born 1977)

Claudia Elisabeth Maria van Thiel (born December 22, 1977, in Wijchen, Gelderland) is a retired female volleyball player from the Netherlands, who represented her native country at the 1996 Summer Olympics in Atlanta, Georgia, finishing in fifth place under the guidance of head coach Bert Goedkoop.
