= Kim Staelens =

Dutch volleyball player

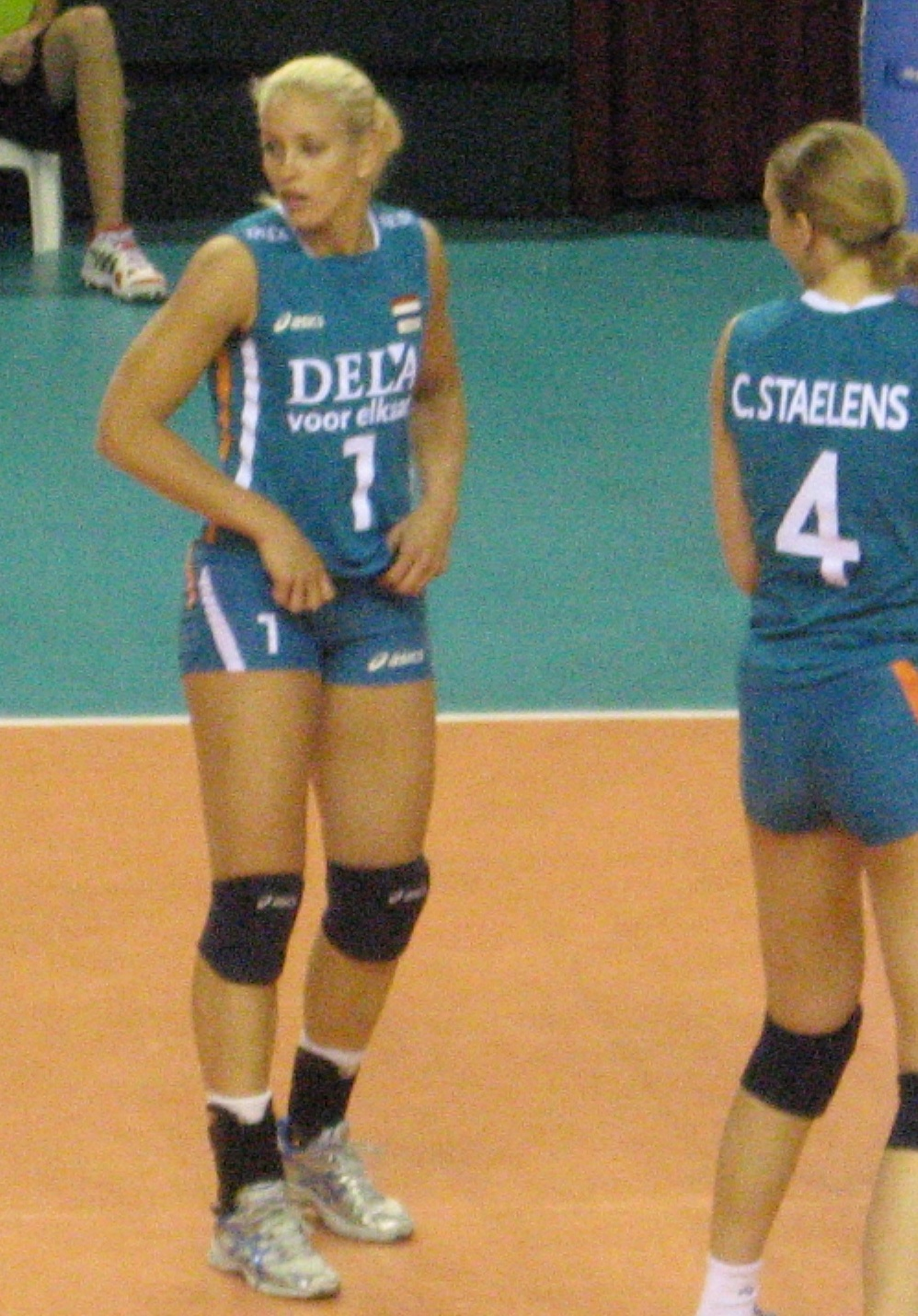

Personal information
- Full name: Kim Staelens
- Born: 7 January 1982 (age 44); Kortrijk, Belgium
- Hometown: Eindhoven, The Netherlands
- Height: 1.82 m (6 ft 0 in)
- Weight: 75 kg (165 lb)
- Spike: 305 cm (120 in)
- Block: 301 cm (119 in)

Volleyball information
- Position: Setter
- Current team: Impel Gwardia Wrocław

National team
Netherlands
Honours
Women's Volleyball
Representing the Netherlands
European Championship
Silver medal – second place	2009 Poland	Team competition
FIVB World Grand Prix
Gold medal – first place	2007 Ningbo	Team competition
- Last updated: 28 October 2006

Kim Staelens (born 7 January 1982 in Kortrijk, Belgium) is a Dutch professional volleyball player last under contract at Romanian team Ştiinţa Bacău. Her older sister Chaïne is also a Dutch international volleyball player. Their father Jean-Pierre played many international matches for the Belgium national volleyball team. Staelens speaks Dutch, English, French and German. Kim Staelens plays as a setter and is able to spike at 305 cm, while she is capable of blocking at 301 cm.

== International team career ==
Born in Belgium both Staelens sisters were known to be talented players and decided to acquire for Dutch citizenship because they did not see enough future in the Belgian team. As their mother is Dutch both were welcomed in The Netherlands and became national team regulars shortly after. So far she has played 154 international matches for the Dutch team. Staelens was part of the Dutch squad for the 2006 World Championship where the placed 8th. She was also part of the team during the 2007 Boris Yeltsin Cup in Yekaterinburg where the Dutch won the silver medal after losing the final to China (3–1).

== Club team career ==
- (Belgium) Hermanas Wervik
- (Belgium) VC Wevelgem
- (Netherlands) Bonduelle WC
- (Netherlands) VC Weert
- (France) Marcq en Baroeul
- (France) USSPA Albi
- (Germany) USC Munster
- (Netherlands) HCC/net Martinus Amstelveen
- (Poland) Impel Gwardia Wrocław
- (Romania) CS Ştiinţa Bacău

At the age of 15 Staelens decided to join her sister and play abroad in the Netherlands. Before that she played mainly in the reserve teams in the Belgian First division. As being only 15 years old she was having a hard time keeping up with her teammates during her first season in The Netherlands at Bonduelle WC. She moved to VC weert and during her second season at the club in 1999 she captured her first two prizes, winning both the Dutch league and the cup.

In 2000, she moved to France to play for Marcq en Baroeul, where she struggled to find her place in the team. She however decided to stay in France, but moved to another team. Also at USSPA Albi she was unable to become a key player and to get used to the French lifestyle. She then found her way to Germany where she signed a contract with USC Munster.

In Munster things went better for herself which also resulted in better results. During her first season she did not capture any prizes but Munster finished in both the German league and cup in second position. One year later they showed their potential and were able to win both competitions. Staelens was at that time still part of the Munster team, however she did miss the crucial part of the season due to a knee injury.

This knee injury prevented her from playing volleyball during the 2004 and 2005 seasons and she was recovering from her injury in a sports clinic in Zeist. For a long time it was unsure whether she was able to return to her top level. As soon as she was able to play in the later part of 2005 she was however immediately being called up for the national squad and participated in several tournaments. Like most of her fellow national squad members and coach Avital Selinger she decided to sign a contract with HCC/net Martinus Amstelveen to be part of a unique project on their way to the 2008 Summer Olympics. It was not much of a surprise that Martinus captured both the Dutch league title as they Dutch cup in that year.

In 2012, she returned to the national team after a break.

== Prizes ==
- Dutch National Championship title: 1999 (VC Weert), 2006 (Martinus)
- Dutch National Cup title: 1999 (VC Weert), 2006 (Martinus)
- German National Championship title: 2003 (USC Munster)
- German National Cup title: 2003 (USC Munster)
- Romanian National Championship title: 2013, 2014 (CS Ştiinţa Bacău)

== Awards ==
- best setter at the 1999 European Youth Championship in Poland
- best setter at the 1999 Youth Eight Nations Tournament in France
- runner-up setter at the 2003 European Championship in Turkey
- fourth best blocker at the 2003 World Grand Prix
- fourth best server at the 2003 World Grand Prix
- fourth best setter at the 2003 World Grand Prix
