= Pioneer Red Wings =

Japanese volleyball club

- Founded: 1979
- Dissolved: 2014
- Ground: Yamagata Prefectural General Sports Park Gymnasium, Tendo, Yamagata and Kawagoe, Saitama Japan.
- Manager & Head coach: (Japan) Mitsuo Shimazu (Japan) Tsutomu Tozawa
- League: V.Premier League
- 2013-14: 8th place (V.Premier League)
- Website: Club home page

Uniforms
| Home | Away |

Pioneer Red Wings was a women's volleyball team based in Tendo city, Yamagata, Japan. It played in V.Premier League. The club was founded in 1979. The owner of the team is Tohoku Pioneer

== History ==
The club was founded in 1979 as Tohoku Pioneer volleyball team. They joined the Regional League in 1985 and were promoted to the Inter-Company League in 1997. They were promoted to the V.League in 2000. In 2003/2004 season, they won the first V.league title.

On 6 April 2014 Red Wings were beaten by Denso Airybees in the V.Challenge match, so will demote to V.Challenge league next season.

On 23 May 2014 Tohoku Pioneer announced that Red Wings stop the activity in September 2014.

== Honours ==
Japan Volleyball League/V.League/V.Premier League

- Champions (2): 2003-2004 and 2005-2006
- Runner-up (1): 2004-2005

Kurowashiki All Japan Volleyball Tournament

- Champions (2): 2003 and 2005

Empress's Cup

- Runner-up (1): 2008

== League results ==
| League | | Position | Teams | Matches | Win | Lose |
|---|---|---|---|---|---|---|
| V.League | 7th (2000–01) | 7th | 10 | 18 | 8 | 10 |
| V.League | 8th (2001–02) | 3rd | 9 | 16 | 11 | 5 |
| V.League | 9th (2002–03) | 5th | 8 | 21 | 11 | 10 |
| V.League | 10th (2003–04) | Champion | 10 | 18 | 14 | 4 |
| V.League | 11th (2004–05) | Runner-up | 10 | 27 | 22 | 5 |
| V.League | 12th (2005–06) | Champion | 10 | 27 | 21 | 6 |
| V・Premier | 2006-07 | 3rd | 10 | 27 | 18 | 9 |
| V・Premier | 2007-08 | 5th | 10 | 27 | 14 | 13 |
| V・Premier | 2008-09 | 6th | 10 | 27 | 13 | 14 |
| V・Premier | 2009-10 | 8th | 8 | 28 | 3 | 25 |
| V・Premier | 2010-11 | 7th | 8 | 26 | 9 | 17 |
| V・Premier | 2011-12 | 6th | 8 | 21 | 7 | 14 |
| V・Premier | 2012-13 | 8th | 8 | 28 | 5 | 23 |
| V・Premier | 2013-14 | 8th | 8 | 28 | 3 | 25 |

== Current squad ==
As of April 2014

- 1 (Serbia) Aleksandra Crnčević (fr)
- 2 (Japan) Akiko Kōno
- 3 (Japan) Chisato Yokota
- 5 (Japan) Akika Hattori
- 6 (Japan) Yōko Hayashi
- 8 (Japan) Kanako Konno
- 9 (Japan) Satoe Mitsuhashi
- 10 (Japan) Yūko Asazu (Sub captain)
- 11 (Japan) Yukiko Arai
- 12 (Japan) Rika Hattori
- 13 (Japan) Shōko Tamura
- 14 (Japan) Ryōko Atago
- 15 (Japan) Fumika Moriya
- 16 (Japan) Yumiko Mochimaru
- 17 (Japan) Akari Watanabe
- 18 (Japan) Tsubura Satō
- 19 (Japan) Mami Ashino
- 20 (Japan) Mami Yoshida (Captain)
- 21 (Japan) Natsuno Kurami
- 22 (Japan) Yuki Araki
- 24 (Japan) Koyomi Tominaga (Sub captain)

== Retired players ==
- (United States) Tayyiba Haneef-Park (2008–09)
- (Croatia) Senna Usic (2007–08)
- (Netherlands) Francien Huurman (2003-2006)
- (United States) Danielle Scott-Arruda (2001-2003)
- (Netherlands) Chaïne Staelens (2010-2013)
- (Japan) Megumi Kurihara (2004-2011)
- (Japan) Ikumi Narita (2009-2011)
- (Japan) Megumi Itabashi (2009-2011)
- (Japan) Saki Sugimoto (2005-2011)
- (Japan) Asako Tajimi (2001-2011)
- (Japan) Miki Sasaki (2001-2011)
- (Japan) Satsuki Minami (2006-2009)
- (Japan) Nanae Takizawa(2006-2009)
- (Japan) Yumi Kohama (2005-2009)
- (Japan) Mami Hosokawa(2004-2009)
- (Japan) Yuki Shoji (2000-2009)
- (Japan) Yukiko Uchida(1999-2007)・(2008-2009)
- (Japan) Ikumi Nishibori (2007-2008)
- (Japan) Masayo Eguchi (2005-2008)
- (Japan) Wakana Uneta (2004-2008)
- (Japan) Tomoko Yoshihara (2002-2006)
- (Japan) Mayumi Saito (1999-2004)
- (Japan) Eiko Koizumi (1999-2002)
- (Japan) Sanae Tsubakimoto (1999-2002)
