= Mami Yoshida =

Japanese volleyball player (born 1986)

Personal information
- Full name: Mami Yoshida
- Nickname: guts
- Born: June 5, 1986 (age 40); MIyako, Fukuoka, Japan
- Height: 1.58 m (5 ft 2 in)
- Weight: 57 kg (126 lb)
- Spike: 271 cm (107 in)

Volleyball information
- Position: Libero
- Current club: Pioneer Red Wings
- Number: 20

National team
Japan

Mami Yoshida (吉田 真未, Yoshida Mami; born June 5, 1986) is a Japanese volleyball player who plays for Pioneer Red Wings. She also plays for the All-Japan women's volleyball team.

Yoshida played for the All-Japan team for the first time at the Montreux Volley Masters in May 2013.

== Clubs ==
- (Japan) Saigawa Junior High
- (Japan) Hakata Girls' Highschool
- (Japan) Pioneer Red Wings (2005-)

== Awards ==
=== Clubs ===
- 2008 Empress's Cup - Runner-Up, with Pioneer Red Wings
