= Kira Bulten =

Dutch swimmer (born 1973)

Personal information
- National team: Netherlands
- Born: 12 May 1973 (age 53)

Sport
- Sport: Swimming
- Strokes: Breaststroke
Medal record
Representing Netherlands
Women's swimming
European Championships (LC)
Bronze medal – third place	1989 Bonn	4×100 m medley relay
Bronze medal – third place	1991 Athens	4×100 m medley relay
|}

Kira Bulten (born 12 May 1973 in Elburg, Gelderland) is a former breaststroke swimmer from the Netherlands, who competed for her native country at the 1992 Summer Olympics in Barcelona, Spain. There she was eliminated in the heats of the 100 m and 200 m breaststroke. In the 4×100 m medley relay she finished in eighth position with the Dutch Team, after gaining the bronze medal in the same event at the 1989 (Bonn) and 1991 European Championships (Athens).
