= Debby Stam =

Dutch volleyball player (born 1984)

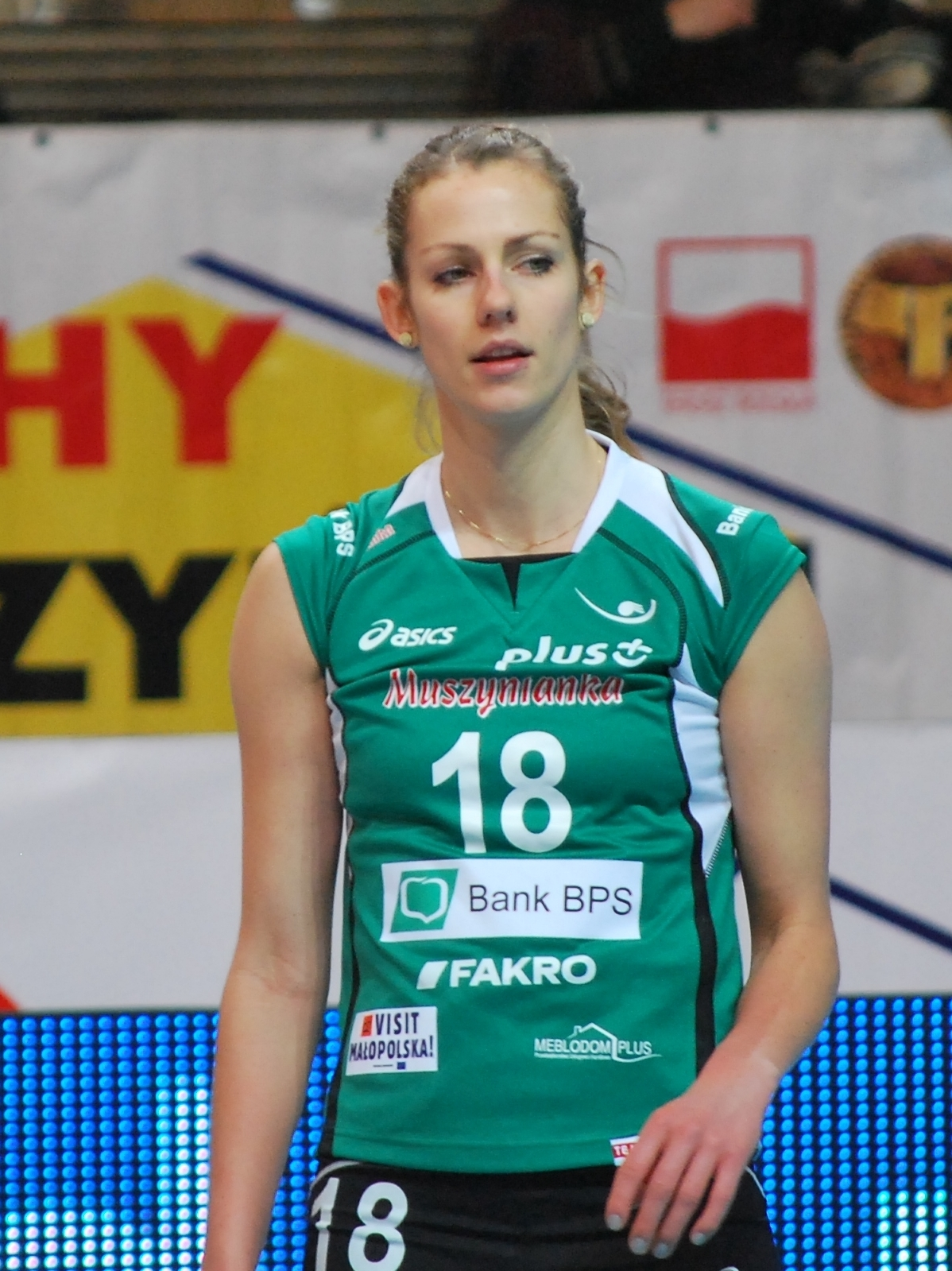

Personal information
- Full name: Debby Stam-Pilon
- Born: 24 July 1984 (age 42); Zaandijk, Netherlands
- Hometown: Amsterdam, Netherlands
- Height: 1.84 m (6 ft 0 in)
- Weight: 70 kg (154 lb)
- Spike: 303 cm (119 in)
- Block: 296 cm (117 in)

Volleyball information
- Position: Libero / Wing Spiker
- Current team: (France) ES Le Cannet

National team
| Netherlands |
Honours
Women's volleyball
Representing the Netherlands
FIVB World Grand Prix
| Gold medal – first place | 2007 Ningbo | Team |
| Bronze medal – third place | 2016 Bangkok | Team |
European Championships
| Silver medal – second place | 2009 Poland | Team |
| Silver medal – second place | 2015 Belgium / Netherlands | Team |
- Last updated: 28 October 2006

Debby Stam-Pilon (born 24 July 1984 in Zaandijk) is a volleyball player from the Netherlands, who currently plays for French club Rocheville Le Cannet. While she began her career as a wing spiker, starting in 2015 Stam became a libero. She represented her country since 2004, winning the FIVB World Grand Prix 2007. In 2015, she played with the Dutch National Team at the 2015 European Games in Baku, Azerbaijan, and one year later attended the 2016 Summer Olympics in Rio de Janeiro, Brazil.

== Personal ==
Stam is married to Paul Pilon. They have a son, Mees, born in October 2014 and a daughter, Zazie, born in April 2018.

== Career ==
| Club | Years |
|---|---|
| (Netherlands) VC Weert | 2003–2004 |
| (Netherlands) DELA Martinus Amstelveen | 2004–2008 |
| (Russia) Universitet-Tekhnolog Belgorod | 2008–2009 |
| (Turkey) VakıfBank Güneş Sigorta Türk Telekom | 2009–2010 |
| (Poland) Bank BPS Muszynianka Fakro Muszyna | 2010–2012 |
| (Azerbaijan) Azerrail Baku | 2012–2013 |
| (France) Rocheville Le Cannet | 2015–2016 |
