= Inmaculada Martínez Cervera =

Spanish politician

Inmaculada Martínez Cervera (Valencia, Spain, 5 October 1971) is a Spanish politician who belongs to the main opposition People's Party (PP).

Single at the time of her election, she is licensed in pedagogy and worked for the Valencian Youth Institute. In 2000 she was selected as part of the PP list for the Spanish Congress of Deputies for Valencia province. Placed thirteenth on the list in a district where the party had never won more than eight seats she failed to be elected at the March 2000 General Election. However a PP gain at that election, coupled with the unprecedented resignation of four PP deputies, resulted in her joining the Congress in April 2002. For the 2004 election she was promoted to tenth place on the PP list, however in that election the PP lost one of their nine seats and the lack of vacancies during the legislature meant that she did not sit in the 2004-2008 parliament. She did not stand in the 2008 election.
