= Chaïne Staelens =

Dutch volleyball player (born 1980)

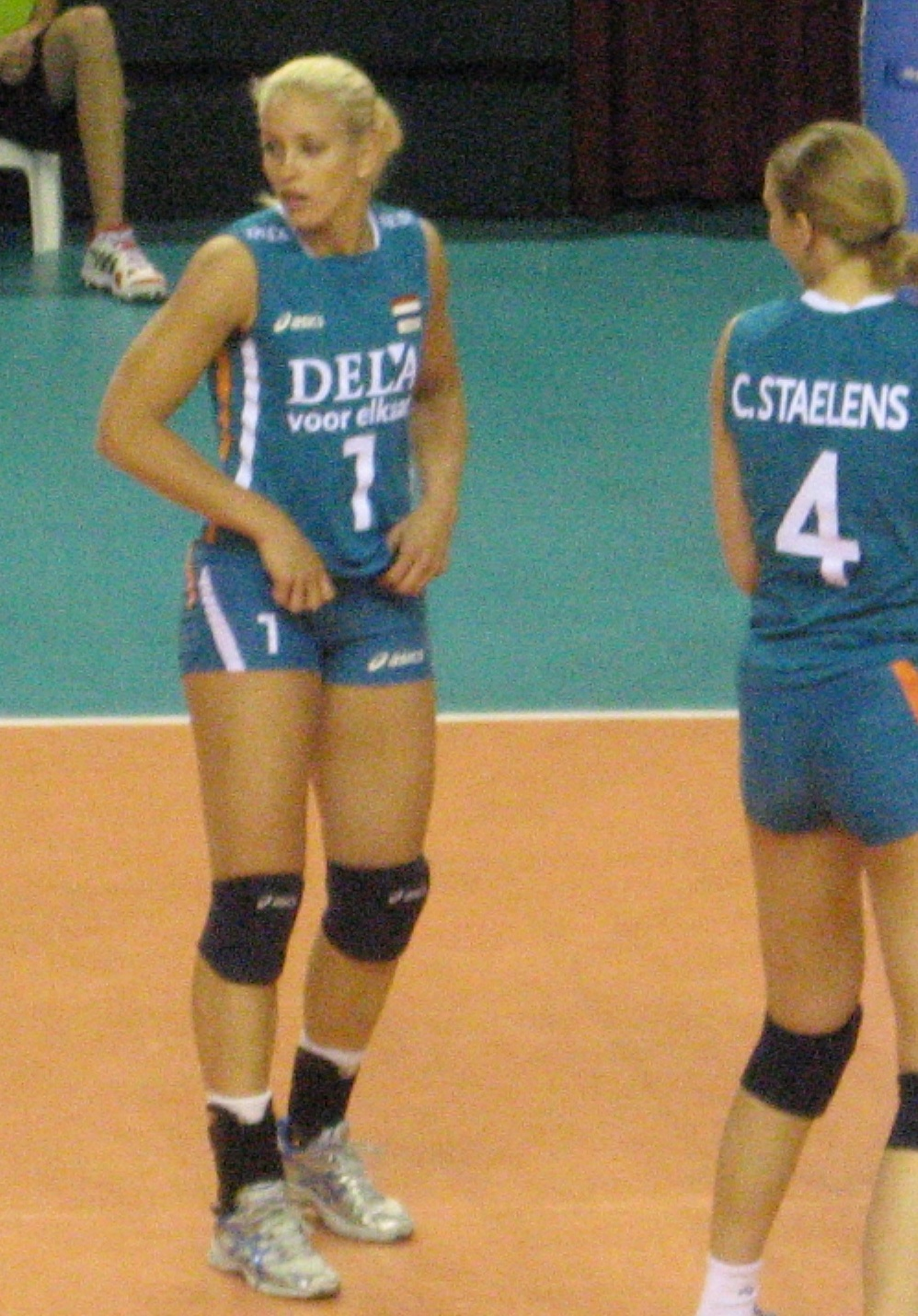

Personal information
- Full name: Chaïne Staelens
- Born: November 7, 1980; Kortrijk, Belgium
- Height: 1.94 m (6 ft 4 in)
- Weight: 77 kg (170 lb)

Volleyball information
- Position: wing-spiker
- Current club: (Japan) Pioneer Red Wings
- Number: 4

Career
Years	Teams
2009-2010; 2010-	(Japan) Denso Airybees (Japan) Pioneer Red Wings

National team
Netherlands
Honours
Women's volleyball
Representing the Netherlands
FIVB World Grand Prix
Gold medal – first place	2007 Ningbo	Team competition
European Championship
Silver medal – second place	2009 Poland	Team

Chaïne Staelens (born November 7, 1980, in Kortrijk, Belgium) is a volleyball player, who plays as a wing-spiker for the Netherlands. She was a member of the Dutch National Women's Team that won the gold medal at the FIVB World Grand Prix 2007 in Ningbo, PR China. She is the older sister of Kim Staelens, who also plays for the national volleyball squad.

== Clubs ==
Unilever Rio de Janeiro

- (Japan) Denso Airybees (2009–2010)
- (Japan) Pioneer Red Wings (2010-)

== Awards ==
=== Individuals ===
- 2009 Montreux Volley Masters "Best Server"
