= Park Kyong-nang =

South Korean volleyball player (born 1984)

Personal information
- Nationality: South Korean
- Born: 1 May 1984 (age 42)
- Hometown: Suwon Kyonggi
- Height: 1.77 m (5 ft 10 in)
- Weight: 68 kg (150 lb)
- Spike: 3,280 cm (1,291 in)
- Block: 279 cm (110 in)

Volleyball information
- Current club: Korea Tobacco & Ginseng
- Number: 9 (national team)

National team
2005	South Korea

Park Kyong-nang (born 1 May 1984) is a South Korean female volleyball player.

She was part of the South Korea women's national volleyball team at the 2005 FIVB World Grand Prix. On club level she played with Korea Tobacco & Ginseng.

== Clubs ==
- (South Korea) Korea Tobacco & Ginseng (2005)
