= Inmaculada Hernández =

Spanish politician (born 1976)

Member of the Senate
- Incumbent
- Assumed office 27 July 2023
- Appointed by: Parliament of Andalusia

Personal details
- Born: 23 July 1976 (age 49)
- Party: People's Party (since 1999)

Inmaculada Hernández Rodríguez (born 23 July 1976) is a Spanish politician serving as a member of the Senate since 2023. She served as mayor of La Zubia from 2014 to 2015 and from 2019 to 2021.
