= Colegio de la Inmaculada =

Colegio de la Inmaculada may refer to:

- Colegio de la Inmaculada (Lima), Lima, Peru.
- Colegio de la Inmaculada (Gijón), Gijón, Spain.
- Colegio de la Inmaculada (Santa Fe), Santa Fe, Argentina.
- Colegio de la Inmaculada Concepcion, Cebu City, Philippines.
- Colegio de la Inmaculada Concepcion de la Concordia, Manila, Philippines.
- Colegio Inmaculada Concepción, San Fernando, Chile.
