= Sandra Wiegers =

Dutch volleyball player (born 1974)

Sandra Wiegers (born 26 April 1974 in Hoogeveen) is a Dutch former volleyball player who participated in the 1992 Summer Olympics. She and Team Netherlands finished 6th in women's volleyball.
