= Gao Lin (volleyball) =

Chinese volleyball player

Personal information
- Nationality: Chinese
- Born: 13 October 1969 (age 57)
- Height: 183 cm (6 ft 0 in)
- Education: Fresno Pacific University

Volleyball information
- Number: 14 (national team); 1 (Fresno Pacific University)

National team
1991–1992	China
Honours
Women's volleyball
Representing China
FIVB World Cup
Silver medal – second place	1991 Japan

Gao Lin (born 13 October 1969), also known as Lin Gao, is a Chinese former volleyball player. She competed in the women's tournament at the 1992 Summer Olympics in Barcelona.

== College ==
Lin played college volleyball for the Fresno Pacific University Sunbirds from 1999 to 2003. She was a four-time NAIA first-team All-American, and holds the school record for career kills with 1,963. She was inducted into the Fresno Pacific University Hall of Fame in 2011.
