= Irena Machovcak =

Dutch volleyball player (born 1968)

Personal information
- Born: 13 November 1968 Prague, Czechoslovakia
Medal record
Women's volleyball
Representing the Netherlands
European Championships
Gold medal – first place	1995 Netherlands	Team competition

Irena Machovcak (born 13 November 1968 in Prague, Czechoslovakia) is a retired volleyball player, who represented the Netherlands at two consecutive Summer Olympics, starting in 1992.

Machovcak was one of the more experienced members of the Netherlands national team that won the gold medal at the 1995 European Championship by defeating Croatia 3–0 in the final.
