= 2007 FIVB Volleyball World Grand Prix =

Volleyball competition held in China

2007 FIVB World Grand Prix
Tournament details
- Host country: China (Final)
- Dates: 4 August – 26 August
- Teams: 12
- Venues: 7 (in 7 host cities)

Final positions
- Champions: Netherlands (1st title)
- Runners-up: China
- Third place: Italy
- Fourth place: Russia

Tournament awards
- MVP: (Netherlands) Manon Flier

The FIVB World Grand Prix 2007 was the fifteenth edition of the annual women's volleyball tournament, which is the female equivalent of the Men's Volleyball World League.

The 2007 World Grand Prix lasted four weeks with a total number of 65 matches. During the first, second, and third week, each team played nine matches in total. Preliminary rounds were staged in Japan (3x), Italy, Poland, Macau, Hong Kong, Russia, and Chinese Taipei.

The final round was played in Ningbo, PR China, at Beilun Gymnasium, over five days and the best six teams from the preliminary rounds. A round robin system was played to decide the 2007 World Grand Prix Champion.

== Qualification ==
=== Asia ===
- The top four Asian teams according to the FIVB World Rankings
  - China
  - Japan
  - Chinese Taipei
  - Kazakhstan

=== Europe ===
- European Qualification Tournament in Varna, Bulgaria, from September 26 to October 1, 2006

==== Group A ====
Pos	Team	Pld	W	L	Pts	SW	SL	SR	SPW	SPL	SPR	Qualification
1	Netherlands	3	3	0	6	9	3	3.000	288	239	1.205	Finals
2	Azerbaijan	3	2	1	5	7	5	1.400	268	247	1.085	Playoffs
3	Poland	3	1	2	4	7	7	1.000	295	300	0.983	Playoffs
4	Bulgaria	3	0	3	3	1	9	0.111	174	239	0.728	

Date		Score		Set 1	Set 2	Set 3	Set 4	Set 5	Total
26 Sep	Poland	2–3	Netherlands	30–28	25–22	22–25	26–28	10–15	113–118
26 Sep	Azerbaijan	3–0	Bulgaria	25–21	25–20	25–18			75–59
27 Sep	Poland	2–3	Azerbaijan	25–23	20–25	25–22	16–25	7–15	93–110
27 Sep	Netherlands	3–0	Bulgaria	25–16	25–17	25–10			75–43
28 Sep	Azerbaijan	1–3	Netherlands	25–19	20–25	24–26	14–25		83–95
28 Sep	Bulgaria	1–3	Poland	20–25	25–14	13–25	14–25		72–89

==== Group B ====
Pos	Team	Pld	W	L	Pts	SW	SL	SR	SPW	SPL	SPR	Qualification
1	Russia	3	2	1	5	8	6	1.333	309	287	1.077	Finals
2	Turkey	3	2	1	5	8	7	1.143	310	310	1.000	Playoffs
3	Italy	3	1	2	4	6	6	1.000	261	262	0.996	Playoffs
4	Serbia and Montenegro	3	1	2	4	5	8	0.625	256	277	0.924	

Date		Score		Set 1	Set 2	Set 3	Set 4	Set 5	Total
26 Sep	Turkey	3–2	Italy	20–25	22–25	25–20	25–19	15–12	107–101
26 Sep	Russia	3–2	Serbia and Montenegro	22–25	25–17	21–25	25–18	15–8	108–93
27 Sep	Italy	3–0	Serbia and Montenegro	25–16	25–17	25–21			75–54
27 Sep	Turkey	3–2	Russia	23–25	21–25	25–20	25–21	15–9	109–100
28 Sep	Russia	3–1	Italy	26–28	25–22	25–17	25–18		101–85
28 Sep	Serbia and Montenegro	3–2	Turkey	25–14	19–25	23–25	25–15	17–15	109–94

==== Play-offs ====
Date		Score		Set 1	Set 2	Set 3	Set 4	Set 5	Total
30 Sep	Azerbaijan	1–3	Poland	25–18	23–25	25–27	20–25		93–95
30 Sep	Turkey	0–3	Italy	20–25	20–25	19–25			59–75

==== Third place match ====
Date		Score		Set 1	Set 2	Set 3	Set 4	Set 5	Total
1 Oct	Poland	0–3	Italy	23–25	20–25	16–25			59–75

==== First place match ====
Date		Score		Set 1	Set 2	Set 3	Set 4	Set 5	Total
1 Oct	Netherlands	0–3	Russia	19–25	19–25	21–25			59–75

  - Russia, Netherlands, Italy and Poland qualified

=== North and South America ===
- 2006 Women's Pan-American Volleyball Cup in San Juan, Puerto Rico, from June 27 to July 8, 2006
  - Brazil
  - Cuba
  - Dominican Republic
  - United States

== Preliminary round ==
=== Ranking ===
The host China and top five teams in the preliminary round advance to the final round.

Pos	Team	Pld	W	L	Pts	SW	SL	SR	SPW	SPL	SPR	Qualification
1	Brazil	9	8	1	17	25	5	5.000	728	550	1.324	Final round
2	Italy	9	7	2	16	24	10	2.400	774	682	1.135	Final round
3	Russia	9	7	2	16	21	14	1.500	788	740	1.065	Final round
4	Poland	9	6	3	15	22	14	1.571	790	758	1.042	Final round
5	Netherlands	9	6	3	15	18	15	1.200	731	705	1.037	Final round
6	Cuba	9	5	4	14	21	15	1.400	823	777	1.059	
7	United States	9	5	4	14	18	18	1.000	784	784	1.000	
8	China (Note: Qualified as hosts) (H)	9	4	5	13	20	17	1.176	816	777	1.050	Final round
9	Japan	9	4	5	13	18	15	1.200	719	702	1.024	
10	Kazakhstan	9	1	8	10	7	26	0.269	681	781	0.872	
11	Dominican Republic	9	1	8	10	6	24	0.250	574	713	0.805	
12	Chinese Taipei	9	0	9	9	0	27	0.000	436	675	0.646	

(H) Host

=== First round ===
==== Group A ====
- Venue: Tokyo, Japan

Date		Score		Set 1	Set 2	Set 3	Set 4	Set 5	Total	Report
3 Ago	Cuba	3–0	Dominican Republic	25–23	25–22	25–15			75–60	P2 P3
3 Ago	Japan	3–0	Kazakhstan	25–23	25–21	25–20			75–64	P2 P3
4 Ago	Cuba	3–0	Kazakhstan	25–17	25–17	25–14			75–48	P2 P3
4 Ago	Japan	3–0	Dominican Republic	25–19	25–11	25–22			75–52	P2 P3
5 Ago	Dominican Republic	2–3	Kazakhstan	19–25	23–25	25–21	25–21	13–15	105–107	P2 P3
5 Ago	Japan	2–3	Cuba	25–20	18–25	25–21	20–25	13–15	101–106	P2 P3

==== Group B ====
- Venue: Verona, Italy

Date		Score		Set 1	Set 2	Set 3	Set 4	Set 5	Total	Report
3 Ago	Brazil	3–0	Netherlands	25–20	25–12	25–12			75–44	P2 P3
3 Ago	Italy	3–0	Chinese Taipei	25–10	25–13	25–18			75–41	P2 P3
4 Ago	Chinese Taipei	0–3	Brazil	19–25	9-25	13–25			41–75	P2 P3
4 Ago	Italy	3–0	Netherlands	25–22	25–18	25–16			75–56	P2 P3
5 Ago	Netherlands	3–0	Chinese Taipei	25–16	25–19	25–13			75–48	P2 P3
5 Ago	Italy	2–3	Brazil	19–25	26–24	24–26	26–24	8-15	103–114	P2 P3

==== Group C ====
- Venue: Rzeszów, Poland

Date		Score		Set 1	Set 2	Set 3	Set 4	Set 5	Total	Report
3 Ago	Russia	3–1	China	27–25	21–25	25–16	25–15		98–81	P2 P3
3 Ago	Poland	2–3	United States	25–19	25–18	17–25	15–25	12–15	94–102	P2 P3
4 Ago	Russia	0–3	United States	23–25	22–25	13–25			58–75	P2 P3
4 Ago	Poland	2–3	China	26–28	26–24	15–25	25–23	12–15	104–115	P2 P3
5 Ago	China	3–0	United States	25–21	30–28	25–20			80–69	P2 P3
5 Ago	Poland	0–3	Russia	17–25	16–25	21–25			54–75	P2 P3

=== Second round ===
==== Group D ====
- Venue: Tokyo, Japan

Date		Score		Set 1	Set 2	Set 3	Set 4	Set 5	Total	Report
10 Ago	Brazil	3–0	Netherlands	25–23	25–23	26–24			76–70	P2 P3
10 Ago	Japan	3–0	Chinese Taipei	25–19	25–17	25–5			75–41	P2 P3
11 Ago	Brazil	3–0	Chinese Taipei	25–13	25–17	25–20			75–50	P2 P3
11 Ago	Japan	2–3	Netherlands	18–25	28–26	20–25	27–25	11–15	104–116	P2 P3
12 Ago	Netherlands	3–0	Chinese Taipei	25–12	25–21	25–19			75–52	P2 P3
12 Ago	Japan	0–3	Brazil	15–25	19–25	13–25			47–75	P2 P3

==== Group E ====
- Venue: Khabarovsk, Russia

Date		Score		Set 1	Set 2	Set 3	Set 4	Set 5	Total	Report
10 Ago	Cuba	1–3	United States	19–25	22–25	25–21	22–25		88–96	P2 P3
10 Ago	Russia	3–0	Kazakhstan	25–16	25–22	28–26			78–64	P2 P3
11 Ago	Cuba	3–0	Kazakhstan	25–23	25–21	25–20			75–64	P2 P3
11 Ago	United States	2–3	Russia	25–18	18–25	24–26	25–21	6–15	98–105	P2 P3
12 Ago	United States	3–1	Kazakhstan	25–21	20–25	25–21	26–24		96–91	P2 P3
12 Ago	Russia	3–2	Cuba	25–23	25–23	24–26	21–25	15–11	110–108	P2 P3

==== Group F ====
- Venue: Hong Kong

Date		Score		Set 1	Set 2	Set 3	Set 4	Set 5	Total	Report
10 Ago	Italy	1–3	Poland	24–26	25–16	18–25	17–25		84–92	P2 P3
10 Ago	China	3–0	Dominican Republic	25–16	25–12	25–14			75–42	P2 P3
11 Ago	Italy	3–0	Dominican Republic	25–16	25–18	25–15			75–49	P2 P3
11 Ago	China	2–3	Poland	25–16	25–21	21–25	16–25	10–15	97–102	P2 P3
12 Ago	Dominican Republic	0–3	Poland	16–25	17–25	19–25			52–75	P2 P3
12 Ago	China	2–3	Italy	21–25	25–20	25–14	20–25	12–15	103–99	P2 P3

=== Third round ===
==== Group G ====
- Venue: Osaka, Japan

Date		Score		Set 1	Set 2	Set 3	Set 4	Set 5	Total	Report
17 Ago	Poland	3–0	Russia	25–21	25–19	28–26			78–66	P2 P3
17 Ago	Japan	3–0	Kazakhstan	25–20	25–22	25–19			75–61	P2 P3
18 Ago	Kazakhstan	2–3	Russia	14–25	25–14	23–25	25–23	10–15	97–102	P2 P3
18 Ago	Japan	1–3	Poland	20–25	25–16	23–25	14–25		82–91	P2 P3
19 Ago	Kazakhstan	1–3	Poland	27–25	20–25	23–25	15–25		85–100	P2 P3
19 Ago	Japan	1–3	Russia	25–21	23–25	18–25	19–25		85–96	P2 P3

==== Group H ====
- Venue: Taipei

Date		Score		Set 1	Set 2	Set 3	Set 4	Set 5	Total	Report
17 Ago	Brazil	3–0	Dominican Republic	25–22	25–19	25–17			75–58	P2 P3
17 Ago	Chinese Taipei	0–3	Italy	20–25	17–25	21–25			58–75	P2 P3
18 Ago	Italy	3–1	Dominican Republic	25–21	25–19	23–25	25–16		98–81	P2 P3
18 Ago	Chinese Taipei	0–3	Brazil	12–25	15–25	20–25			47–75	P2 P3
19 Ago	Chinese Taipei	0–3	Dominican Republic	16–25	20–25	22–25			58–75	P2 P3
19 Ago	Italy	3–1	Brazil	25–20	25–21	15–25	25–22		90–88	P2 P3

==== Group I ====
- Venue: Macau

Date		Score		Set 1	Set 2	Set 3	Set 4	Set 5	Total	Report
17 Ago	Cuba	1–3	Netherlands	25–27	27–25	18–25	20–25		90–102	P2 P3
17 Ago	China	3–0	United States	25–18	25–17	25–22			75–57	P2 P3
18 Ago	Cuba	2–3	United States	25–18	21–25	23–25	25–22	13–15	107–105	P2 P3
18 Ago	China	2–3	Netherlands	23–25	25–19	25–23	14–25	12–15	99–107	P2 P3
19 Ago	United States	1–3	Netherlands	18–25	23–25	25–11	20–25		86–86	P2 P3
19 Ago	China	1–3	Cuba	24–26	25–23	22–25	20–25		91–99	P2 P3

== Final round ==
- Venue: Ningbo, PR China

Date		Score		Set 1	Set 2	Set 3	Set 4	Set 5	Total	Report
22 Ago	Brazil	3–0	Poland	25–21	25–21	25–17			75–59	P2 P3
22 Ago	Italy	3–1	Russia	25–18	25–17	23–25	25–17		98–77	P2 P3
22 Ago	China	2–3	Netherlands	26–28	24–26	25–23	25–23	8–15	108–115	P2 P3
23 Ago	Russia	3–2	Brazil	25–16	15–25	19–25	25–17	15–13	99–96	P2 P3
23 Ago	Italy	1–3	Netherlands	24–26	25–22	25–27	16–25		90–100	P2 P3
23 Ago	Poland	2–3	China	25–21	15–25	16–25	25–22	9–15	90–108	P2 P3
24 Ago	Brazil	2–3	Netherlands	25–19	19–25	23–25	25–23	8–15	100–107	P2 P3
24 Ago	Russia	3–0	Poland	25–11	25–22	26–24			76–57	P2 P3
24 Ago	Italy	2–3	China	23–25	25–19	22–25	26–24	12–15	108–108	P2 P3
25 Ago	Netherlands	3–0	Poland	25–22	25–22	25–23			75–67	P2 P3
25 Ago	China	3–0	Russia	25–23	27–25	25–22			77–70	P2 P3
25 Ago	Brazil	1–3	Italy	22–25	25–19	18–25	21–25		86–94	P2 P3
26 Ago	Netherlands	3–2	Russia	21–25	25–18	25–13	20–25	15–8	106–89	P2 P3
26 Ago	Poland	3–0	Italy	25–21	25–18	25–19			75–58	P2 P3
26 Ago	China	3–0	Brazil	25–21	25–21	25–13			75–55	P2 P3

=== Final ranking ===
Pos	Team	Pld	W	L	Pts	SW	SL	SR	SPW	SPL	SPR
1	Netherlands	5	5	0	10	15	7	2.143	503	454	1.108
2	China	5	4	1	9	14	7	2.000	476	438	1.087
3	Italy	5	2	3	7	9	11	0.818	448	446	1.004
4	Russia	5	2	3	7	9	11	0.818	411	434	0.947
5	Brazil	5	1	4	6	8	12	0.667	412	434	0.949
6	Poland	5	1	4	6	5	12	0.417	348	392	0.888

== Overall ranking ==
Place	Team
1st place, gold medalist(s)	Netherlands
2nd place, silver medalist(s)	China
3rd place, bronze medalist(s)	Italy
4.	Russia
5.	Brazil
6.	Poland
7.	United States
8.	Japan
9.	Cuba
10.	Kazakhstan
11.	Dominican Republic
12.	Chinese Taipei

2007 FIVB Women's World Grand Prix winners

Netherlands
First title

Team roster
Kim Staelens, Francien Huurman, Chaïne Staelens, Mirjam Orsel, Alice Blom, Floortje Meijners, Janneke van Tienen, Caroline Wensink, Manon Flier, Riëtte Fledderus, Ingrid Visser (c) and Debby Stam
Head coach
Avital Selinger

== Individual awards ==
- Most valuable player:
  - Manon Flier (NED)
- Best spiker:
  - Taismary Agüero (ITA)
- Best blocker:
  - Eleonora Dziekiewicz (POL)
- Best server:
  - Yang Hao (CHN)
- Best libero:
  - Zhang Xian (CHN)
- Best setter:
  - Wei Qiuyue (CHN)
- Best scorer:
  - Taismary Agüero (ITA)
