= Cintha Boersma =

Dutch volleyball player (born 1969)

Personal information
- Full name: Jacintha Hedwig Jeanne Boersma
- Nickname: Cintha Boersma
- Born: 1 May 1969 (age 57); Amsterdam, North Holland, Netherlands

Volleyball information
- Current club: (Italy) Jogging Altamura
Honours
Women's volleyball
Representing the Netherlands
European Championships
Gold medal – first place	1995 Netherlands	Team competition

Jacintha ("Cintha") Hedwig Jeanne Boersma (born 1 May 1969) is a retired volleyball player from the Netherlands, who represented her native country at two consecutive Summer Olympics, starting in 1992.

Boersma was a member of the Netherlands national team that won the gold medal at the 1995 European Championship by defeating Croatia 3–0 in the final. She was considered the most valuable player at the Atlanta Games.

On club level she played with Jogging Altamura in Italy.

Her brother is beach volleyball player Emiel Boersma.
