= Bert Goedkoop =

Dutch volleyball player (born 1956)

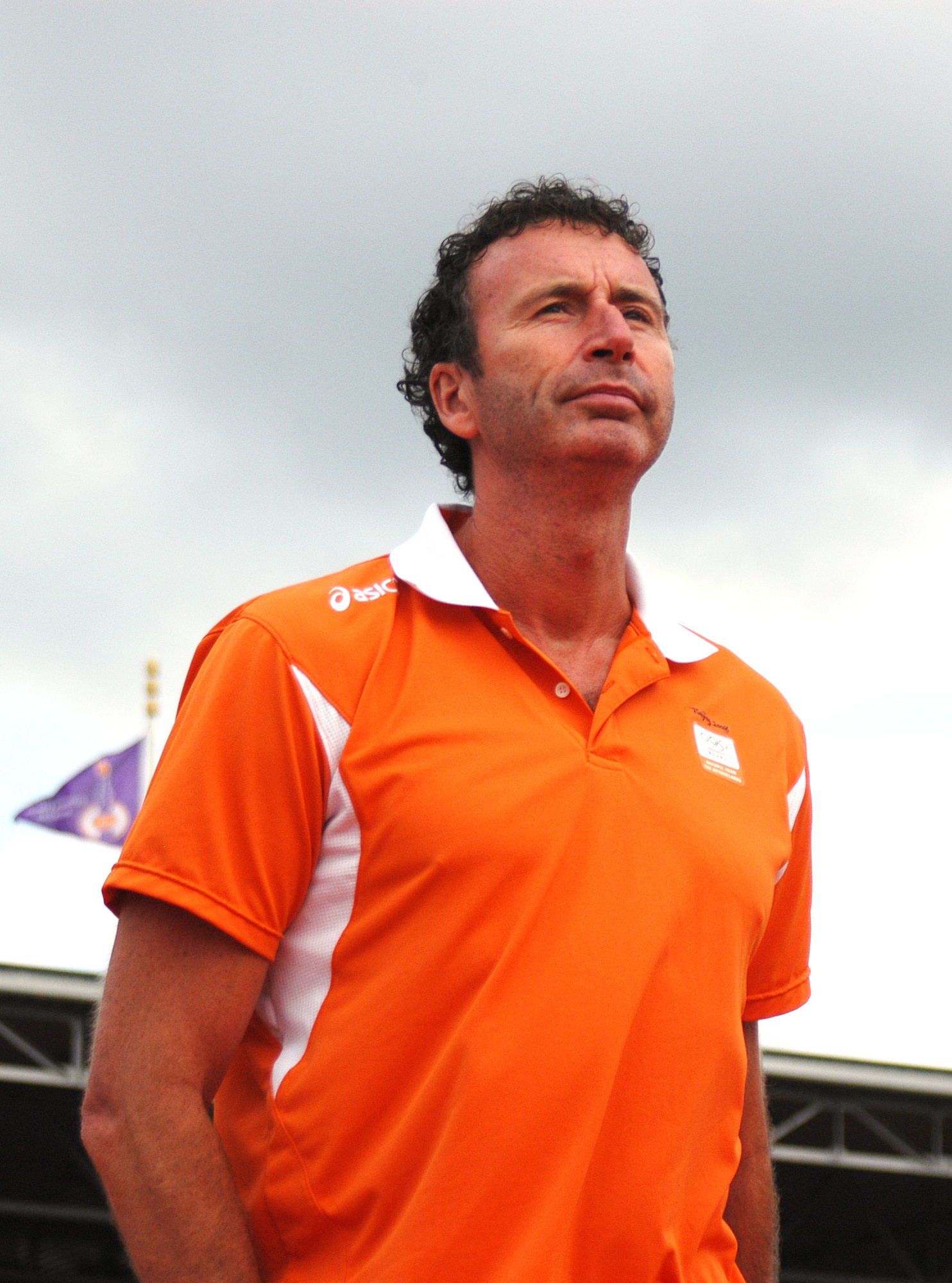
Goedkoop at the Dutch 2008 Summer Olympic celebrations

Bert Goedkoop (born February 15, 1956) is a Dutch volleyball player and coach. Among his accomplishments, he was head coach of the 2001 Dutch national men's team when it took 7th at the World League finals in Katowice and head coach of the Netherlands women's national volleyball team when it took the 1995 European Championship.
