= Inmaculada Torres =

Spanish volleyball player (born 1971)

Personal information
- Full name: Inmaculada Torres Cerezo
- Nickname: Inma Torres
- Nationality: Spanish
- Born: 31 December 1971 (age 54); Murcia, Spain

Inmaculada Torres (born 31 December 1971) is a Spanish former volleyball player who competed in the 1992 Summer Olympics.
