= Ikuyo Namura =

Japanese volleyball player

Personal information
- Born: 13 May 1969 (age 57); Tatsuno, Hyogo, Japan
- Height: 1.66 m (5 ft 5 in)

Volleyball information
- Position: Outside hitter
- Number: 7

National team
1992	Japan

Ikuyo Namura (Japanese: 苗村 郁代; born 13 May 1969) is a Japanese former volleyball player who competed in the 1992 Summer Olympics in Barcelona.

In 1992, Namura finished fifth with the Japanese team in the Olympic tournament.
