= Vera Koenen =

Dutch volleyball player (born 1967)

Personal information
- Nationality: Dutch
- Born: 2 January 1967 (age 59) Alkmaar, the Netherlands
- Height: 180 cm (5 ft 11 in)
- Weight: 81 kg (179 lb)

Volleyball information
- Current club: Sliedrecht
- Number: 6 (national team)

Career
- Years: Team
- 1994: Dynamo Apeldoorn, Avero sneekMartinus Amsterdam

National team
- Years: Team
- 1986-1994: Netherlands

Vera Koenen (born 2 January 1967 in Alkmaar) was a Dutch female volleyball player.

She was part of the Netherlands women's national volleyball team at the 1992 Summer Olympics, and the 1994 FIVB Women's Volleyball World Championship. On club level she played with Martinus Amsterdam.

Martinus Amstelveen AS Cannes Avero Sneek Dynamo Apeldoorn ATC Hengelo
