= Kirsten Gleis =

Dutch volleyball player (born 1969)

Personal information
- Nationality: Dutch
- Born: 22 May 1969 (age 57); Enschede
- Height: 1.85 m (6 ft 1 in)

Volleyball information
- Number: 12 (national team)

Career
Years	Teams
1994	Martinus Amsterdam

National team
< 1992 - > 1994	Netherlands

Kirsten Joke Hermine Gleis (born 22 May 1969) is a retired Dutch female volleyball player.

She played 241 matches with the Netherlands women's national volleyball team, including those at the 1992 Olympic Games, and the 1994 World Championships. On club level she played with Martinus Amsterdam.

== Clubs ==
- Illinois Fighting Illini women's volleyball (1992-1993)
- Martinus Amsterdam (1994)
