= Inmaculada Martinez-Zarzoso =

Spanish economist

Inmaculada Martínez-Zarzoso is a Spanish economist and currently a professor at the chair of economic development at the University of Göttingen.

She is also full professor at the Jaume I University and co-founder of the Institute of International Economics. And first vice-chair of the International Network for Economic Research (INFER), as well as an affiliate at the Economic Research Forum.

== Career and education ==
She obtained a BA from the University of Valencia, a master in international economics and a PhD University of Birmingham. She has been a professor of economics at the Universidad Jaume I since 1991. She joined the University of Göttingen in 2012. She has done research stays at the Paris School of Economics in 2019 and the Geneva School of Economics in 2023 and 2024.

== Research ==
Martinez-Zarzoso mainly works on international economics, development economics and environmental economics. Her works have been cited more than 12000 times according to Google Scholar. Her research has been published in Economics Letters, Applied Economics and Ecological Economics. She is the 94th most cited woman in economics according to IDEAS/RePEc.

Her research has been quoted in El País, Telos, El Periodico Mediterraneo, VoxEU, and Deutsche Welle.

=== Selected bibliography ===
- Inmaculada Martínez-Zarzosoa and Antonello Maruotti, "The impact of urbanization on CO2 emissions: Evidence from developing countries". Ecological Economics. 70 (7): 1344–1353.
- Martı́nez-Zarzoso, Inmaculada; Bengochea-Morancho, Aurelia (2004-01-01). "Pooled mean group estimation of an environmental Kuznets curve for CO2". Economics Letters. 82 (1): 121–126.
- Martínez-Zarzoso, Inmaculada (2011-01-01). "The log of gravity revisited". Applied Economics. 45 (3): 311–327.
