= Henriëtte Weersing =

Dutch volleyball player (born 1965)

Personal information
- Born: 11 October 1965 (age 60) Winschoten, Groningen, Netherlands
- Height: 186 cm (6 ft 1 in)
Medal record
Women's volleyball
Representing the Netherlands
European Championships
Gold medal – first place	1995 Netherlands	Team competition

Henriëtte Weersing (born 11 October 1965) is a retired volleyball player from the Netherlands, who represented her native country at two consecutive Summer Olympics, starting in 1992.

Weersing was a leading member of the Netherlands national team that won the gold medal at the 1995 European Championship by defeating Croatia 3–0 in the final.
