= Marjolein de Jong =

Dutch volleyball player (born 1968)

Personal information
- Born: 16 May 1968 (age 58) Lekkerkerk, South Holland, Netherlands
Medal record
Women's volleyball
Representing the Netherlands
European Championships
Gold medal – first place	1995 Netherlands	Team competition

Marjolein Elisabeth de Jong (born 16 May 1968 in Lekkerkerk, South Holland) is a retired volleyball player from the Netherlands, who represented her native country at two consecutive Summer Olympics, starting in 1992.

De Jong was a member of the Netherlands national team that won the gold medal at the 1995 European Championship by defeating Croatia 3–0 in the final.
