= Aafke Hament =

Dutch volleyball player (born 1971)

Personal information
- Nationality: Dutch
- Born: 6 February 1971 (age 55); Amsterdam
- Height: 181 cm (5 ft 11 in)

Volleyball information
- Number: 8 (national team)

Career
Years	Teams
1994	Schweriner SC

National team
1994	Netherlands

Aafke Hament (born 6 February 1971) is a Dutch volleyball player who was part of the Netherlands women's national volleyball team.

She represented her native country at 1992 Olympic Games Barcelona, and the 1994 FIVB Women's Volleyball World Championship. On club level she played with Schweriner SC.

== Clubs ==
- Schweriner SC (1994)
