= Inmaculada González =

Spanish volleyball player (born 1970)

Personal information
- Full name: Inmaculada González
- Nationality: Spanish
- Born: December 26, 1970 (age 55); Granada, Spain

Inmaculada González (born 26 December 1970) is a Spanish former volleyball player who competed in the 1992 Summer Olympics.
