= Erna Brinkman =

Dutch volleyball player (born 1972)

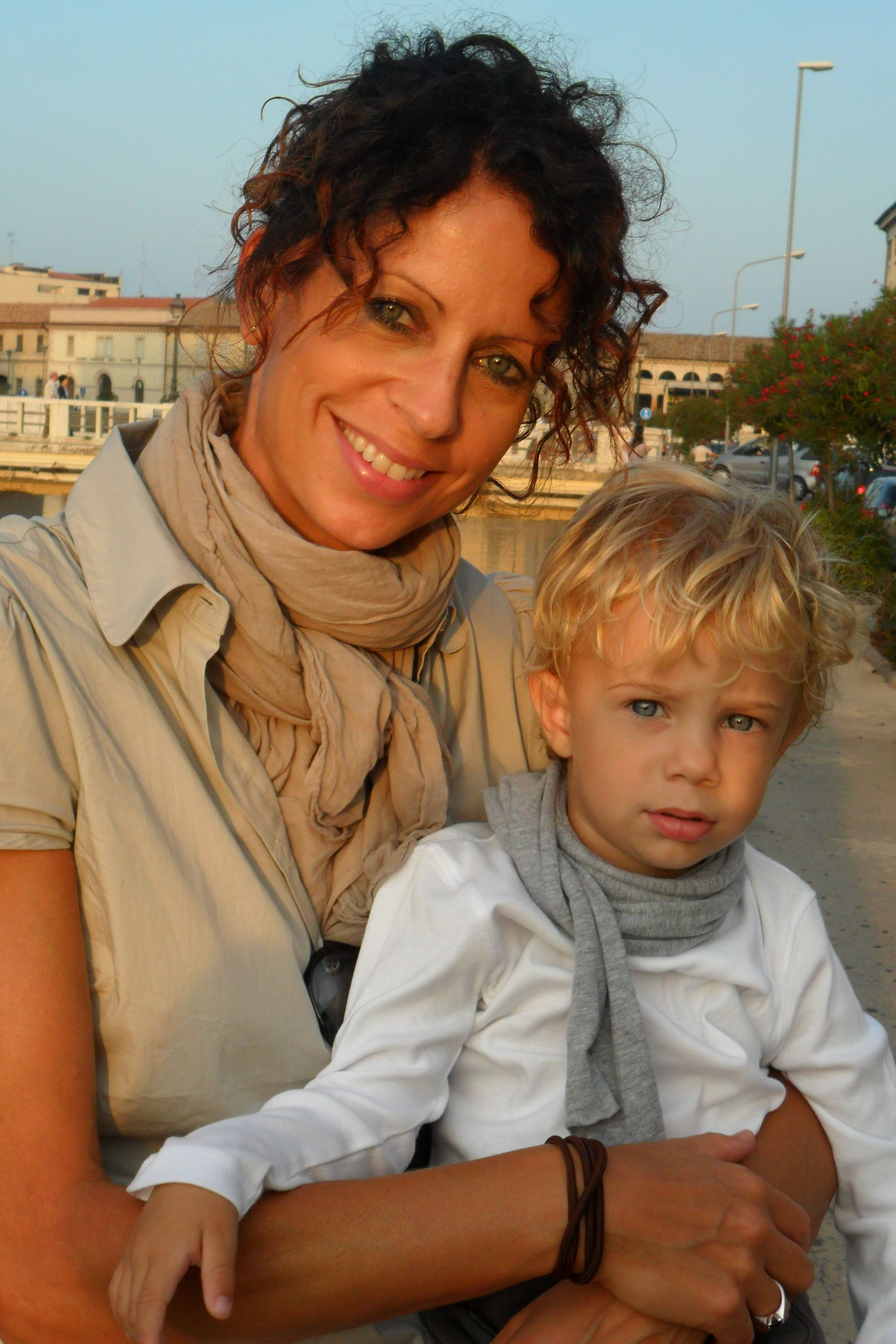
- Erna Brinkman and her son

Personal information
- Born: 25 March 1972 (age 54) Sneek, Friesland, Netherlands
Medal record
Women's volleyball
Representing the Netherlands
European Championships
Gold medal – first place	1995 Netherlands	Team competition

Erna Augusta Brinkman (born 25 March 1972 in Sneek, Friesland) is a retired volleyball player from the Netherlands, who represented her native country at two consecutive Summer Olympics, starting in 1992.

Brinkman was a member of the Netherlands national team that won the gold medal at the 1995 European Championship by defeating Croatia 3–0 in the final.
