= Christin Gühr =

German volleyball player (born 1982)

Christin Guhr

Personal information
- Nationality: German
- Born: 16 March 1982 (age 44)
- Height: 184 cm (6 ft 0 in)
- Weight: 70 kg (154 lb)
- Spike: 315 cm (124 in)
- Block: 299 cm (118 in)

Volleyball information
- Number: 7 (national team)

Career
Years	Teams
2005	Dresdner SC

National team
2005	Germany
Honours
Women's volleyball
Representing Germany
European Championship
Bronze medal – third place	2003 Ankara	Team competition

Christin Guhr (born 16 March 1982) is a German female volleyball player. She was part of the Germany women's national volleyball team.

She participated at the 2003 Women's European Volleyball Championship, and at the 2005 FIVB Volleyball World Grand Prix. On club level she played for Dresdner SC in 2005.
