= Chen Fengqin =

Chinese former volleyball player

Personal information
- Born: 21 March 1965 (age 61)
- Height: 178 cm (5 ft 10 in)

Volleyball information
- Number: 8

National team
1991–1992	China
Honours
Women's volleyball
Representing China
FIVB World Cup
Silver medal – second place	1991 Japan

Chen Fengqin (born 21 March 1965) is a Chinese former volleyball player who competed in the 1992 Summer Olympics in Barcelona.
