= Linda Moons =

Dutch volleyball player (born 1965)

Personal information
- Nationality: Dutch
- Born: 14 May 1965 (age 59); Breukelen, Netherlands

Sport
- Sport: Volleyball

Linda Moons (born 14 May 1965) is a Dutch volleyball player. She competed in the women's tournament at the 1992 Summer Olympics.
