= Heleen Crielaard =

Dutch volleyball player (born 1967)

Personal information
- Nationality: Dutch
- Born: 10 January 1967 (age 58) 's-Hertogenbosch, Netherlands

Sport
- Sport: Volleyball

Heleen Crielaard (born 10 January 1967) is a Dutch volleyball player. She competed in the women's tournament at the 1992 Summer Olympics.
