= Avital Selinger =

Dutch volleyball player and coach

Avital Selinger אביטל סלינגר
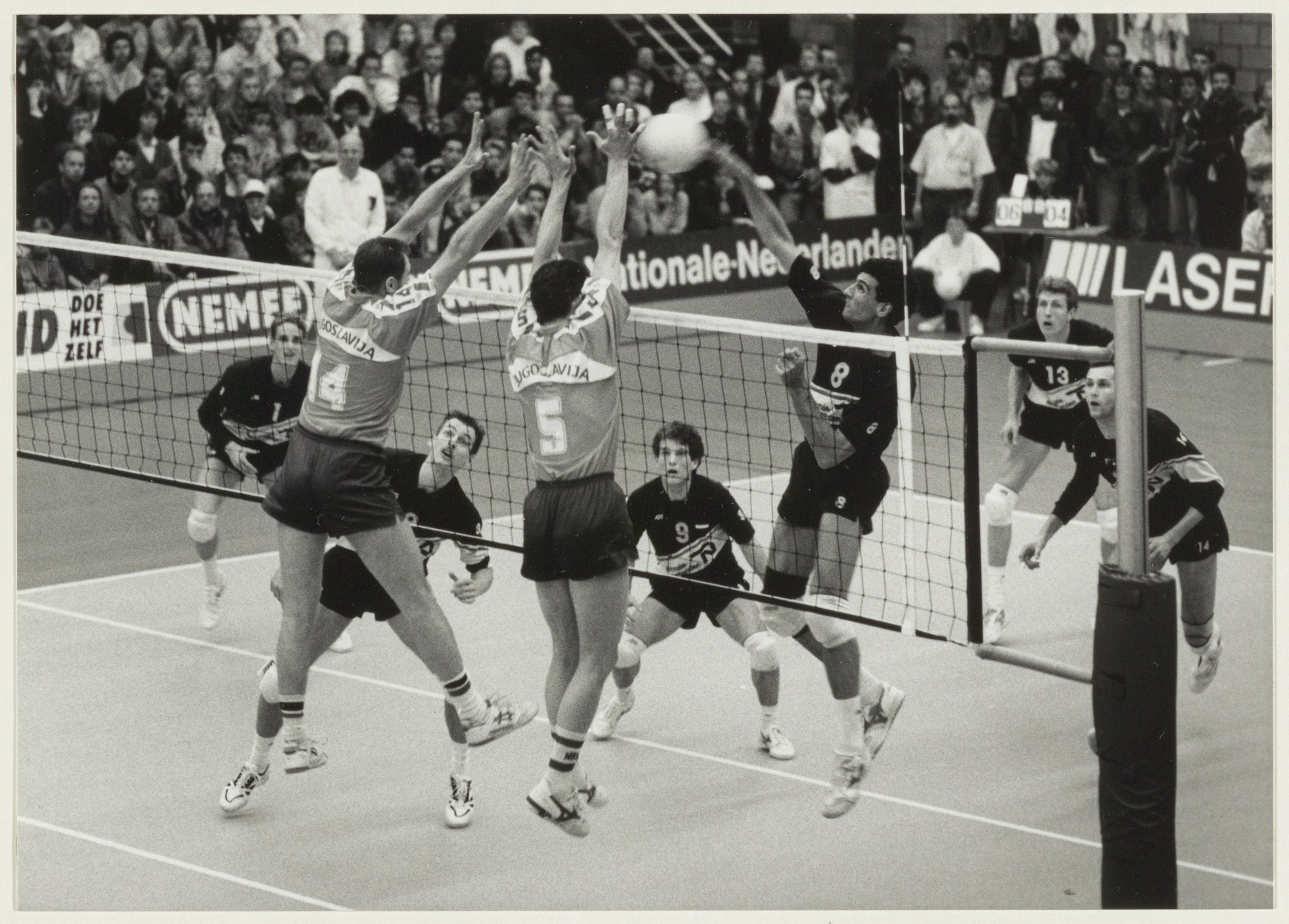
- Avital Selinger (center, wearing #9).

Personal information
- Full name: Avital Haim Selinger
- Born: 10 March 1959 (age 67); Haifa, Israel
- Height: 175 cm (5 ft 9 in)

Volleyball information
- Position: Setter
- Number: 9

National team
| 1987–1992 | Netherlands |
Honours
Men's volleyball
Representing the Netherlands
Olympic Games
| Silver medal – second place | 1992 Barcelona | Team |
World League
| Silver medal – second place | 1990 Osaka |
European Championship
| Bronze medal – third place | 1989 Sweden |
| Bronze medal – third place | 1991 Germany |

Avital Haim Selinger (Hebrew: אביטל חיים סלינגר; born 10 March 1959) is a volleyball coach and former volleyball player. Selinger played for the Netherlands men's national volleyball team at the 1988 Summer Olympics in Seoul and the 1992 Summer Olympics in Barcelona, where he won a silver medal.

== Coaching ==
After taking the command as head coach of the Swiss club Voléro Zürich in April 2015, Selinger guided them to the bronze medal at the 2015 FIVB Club World Championship in Zürich.

== Personal life ==
Selinger is the son of volleyball coach and former player Arie Selinger.

== See also ==
- List of select Jewish volleyball players
