= Archery at the 1992 Summer Olympics – Women's individual =

Archery at the Olympics

Women's individual at the Games of the XXV Olympiad
- Venue: Camp Olímpic de Tir amb Arc
- Dates: 31 July – 2 August 1992
- Competitors: 61 from 27 nations

Medalists
1st place, gold medalist(s)		Cho Youn-jeong	South Korea
2nd place, silver medalist(s)		Kim Soo-nyung	South Korea
3rd place, bronze medalist(s)		Natalia Valeeva	Unified Team

The women's individual was an archery event held as part of the Archery competition at the 1992 Summer Olympics programme. Like other archery events at the Olympics, it featured the recurve discipline. All archery was done at a range of 70 metres. 61 archers competed.

The competition format was completely revamped from prior Games. Head-to-head competition was introduced, after a ranking round. Furthermore, all archery was now done at a range of 70 metres whereas previously multiple distances were used.

The competition began with a 144-arrow ranking round. The top 32 individual archers were seeded into a single-elimination tournament called the "Olympic round". For each match, the archers shot 12 arrows. In all matches, losers were eliminated and received a final rank determined by their score in that round, with the exception of the semifinals. The losers of the semifinals competed in the bronze medal match. The scores of the ranking round were also used to determine the team ranks for the team competition.

== Results ==
=== Elimination round ===
Rank	Archer	Nation	Ranking round
1	Cho Youn-jeong	South Korea	1375
2	Kim Soo-nyung	South Korea	1364
3	Lee Eun-kyung	South Korea	1355
4	Natalia Valeeva	Unified Team	1346
5	Denise Parker	United States	1333
6	Khatouna Kvrivichvili	Unified Team	1326
7	Alison Williamson	Great Britain	1323
8	Lai Fang-mei	Chinese Taipei	1323
9	Séverine Bonal	France	1321
10	Joanna Nowicka	Poland	1315
11	Ma Xiangjun	China	1313
12	Natalia Nasaridze	Turkey	1307
13	Lyudmila Arzhannikova	Unified Team	1306
14	Kim Jong-hwa	North Korea	1305
15	Maria Testa	Italy	1304
16	Judit Kovács	Hungary	1304
17	Wang Hong	China	1302
18	Lin Yi-yin	Chinese Taipei	1302
19	Wang Xiaozhu	China	1295
20	Jennifer O'Donnell	United States	1295
21	Jenny Sjöwall	Sweden	1293
22	Ana Sousa	Portugal	1288
23	Nathalie Hibon	France	1285
24	Ri Myong-gum	North Korea	1281
25	Christel Verstegen	Netherlands	1275
26	Lise-Lotte Djerf	Sweden	1275
27	Jacqueline van Rozendaal	Netherlands	1271
28	Zehra Öktem	Turkey	1271
29	Sherry Block	United States	1271
30	Purnama Pandiangan	Indonesia	1270
31	Edyta Korotkin	Poland	1270
32	Jargalyn Otgon	Mongolia	1270
33	Nurfitriyana Saiman	Indonesia	1270
34	Kristina Persson-Nordlander	Sweden	1266
35	Marina Szendey	Hungary	1265
36	Joanne Edens	Great Britain	1264
37	Faye Johnstone	New Zealand	1261
38	Jeannette Goergen-Philipp	Luxembourg	1261
39	Elif Ekşi	Turkey	1258
40	Rusena Gelanteh	Indonesia	1257
41	Christine Gabillard	France	1254
42	Teresa Fernández	Spain	1254
43	Astrid Hänschen	Germany	1245
44	Cornelia Pfohl	Germany	1239
45	Aurora Bretón	Mexico	1230
46	Sylvia Harris	Great Britain	1230
47	Keiko Nakagomi	Japan	1229
48	Reiko Fujita	Japan	1228
49	Yukiko Ikeda	Japan	1223
50	Iwona Okrzesik	Poland	1223
51	Liu Pi-yu	Chinese Taipei	1222
52	Sin Song-hui	North Korea	1215
53	Marion Wagner	Germany	1207
54	Tímea Kiss	Hungary	1207
55	María Echavarría	Colombia	1201
56	Johanna Schenk	South Africa	1184
57	Patricia Obregón	Costa Rica	1164
58	Karma Tshomo	Bhutan	1160
59	Sjan van Dijk	Netherlands	1154
60	Pem Tshering	Bhutan	1129
61	Namgyal Lhamu	Bhutan	1047

=== Knockout stage ===
Round of 32
Cho Y-j (KOR)	111
Otgon (MGL)	109
Kovács (HUN)	103
Wang (CHN)	93
Lai (TPE)	109
Verstegen (NED)	100
Bonal (FRA)	104
Ri (PRK)	96
Valeeva (EUN)	101
Block (USA)	99
O'Donnell (USA)	101
Arzhannikova (EUN)	97
Parker (USA)	108
Öktem (TUR)	95
Nasaridze (TUR)	105
Sjöwall (SWE)	104
Ma Xj (CHN)	101
Sousa (POR)	98
Kvrivichvili (EUN)	108
v. Rozendaal (NED)	102
Wang Xz (CHN)	103
Kim J-h (PRK)	102
Lee E-k (KOR)	106
Pandiangan (INA)	100
Nowicka (POL)	102
Hibon (FRA)	100
Williamson (GBR)	107
Djerf (SWE)	97
Lin (TPE)	106
Testa (ITA)	100
Kim S-n (KOR)	106
Korotkin (POL)	92

Round of 16
Cho (KOR)	113
Kovács (HUN)	97
Lai F-m (TPE)	109
Bonal (FRA)	108
Valeeva (EUN)	112
O'Donnell (USA)	105
Parker (USA)	105
Nasaridze (TUR)	100
Ma Xj (CHN)	104
Kvrivichvili (EUN)	111
Wang Xz (CHN)	107
Lee E-k (KOR)	103
Nowicka (POL)	107
Williamson (GBR)	107*
Lin Y-y (TPE)	104
Kim S-n (KOR)	114

Quarterfinals
Cho Y-j (KOR)	105
Lai F-m (TPE)	100
Valeeva (EUN)	107
Parker (USA)	105
Kvrivichvili (EUN)	101
Wang Xz (CHN)	108
Williamson (GBR)	96
Kim S-n (KOR)	112

Semifinals
Cho Y-j (KOR)	111
Valeeva (EUN)	102
Wang Xz (CHN)	105
Kim S-n (KOR)	106

Gold medal final
Cho Y-j (KOR)	112
Kim S-n (KOR)	105
Bronze medal final
Valeeva (EUN)	104
Wang Xz (CHN)	102

== Sources ==
- Official Report
- Wudarski, Pawel (1999). "Wyniki Igrzysk Olimpijskich" (in Polish). Archived from the original on 18 January 2008.
