= Archery at the 1992 Summer Olympics – Women's team =

Archery at the Olympics

Women's team at the Games of the XXV Olympiad
- Venue: Camp Olímpic de Tir amb Arc
- Dates: 31 July – 4 August 1992
- Competitors: 51 from 17 nations

Medalists
1st place, gold medalist(s)		Cho Youn-Jeong; Kim Soo-Nyung; Lee Eun-Kyung	South Korea
2nd place, silver medalist(s)		Ma Xiangjun; Wang Hong; Wang Xiaozhu	China
3rd place, bronze medalist(s)		Natalia Valeeva; Khatouna Kvrivichvili; Lyudmila Arzhanikova	Unified Team

The women's team was an archery event held as part of the Archery competition at the 1992 Summer Olympics programme.

== Results ==
The score for the team ranking round was the sum of the three archers' scores in the individual ranking round. No more bows were shot to get the score of the teams.

=== Elimination round ===
Rank	Nation	Archers	Score
1	South Korea	Cho Youn-Jeong; Kim Soo-Nyung; Lee Eun-Kyung	4094
2	Unified Team	Natalia Valeeva; Khatouna Kvrivichvili; Lyudmila Arzhanikova	3978
3	China	Ma Xiangjun; Wang Hong; Wang Xiaozhu	3910
4	United States	Denise Parker; Jennifer O'Donnell; Sherry Block	3899
5	France	Séverine Bonal; Nathalie Hibon; Christine Gabillard	3860
6	Chinese Taipei	Lai Fang-Mei; Lin Yi-Yin; Liu Pi-Yu	3847
7	Turkey	Natalia Nasaridze; Zehra Öktem; Elif Ekşi	3836
8	Sweden	Jenny Sjöwall; Liselotte Djerf; Kristina Persson	3834
9	Great Britain	Alison Williamson; Joanne Edens; Sylvia Harris	3817
10	Poland	Joanna Nowicka; Edyta Korotkin; Iwona Okrzesik	3808
11	North Korea	Kim Jong-Hwa; Li Myong-Gum; Sin Song-Hui	3801
12	Indonesia	Purnama Pandiangan; Nurfitriyana Saiman; Rusena Gelanteh	3797
13	Hungary	Judit Kovács; Marina Szendey; Tímea Kiss	3776
14	Netherlands	Jacqueline van Rozendaal; Christel Verstegen; Adriana van Dyck	3700
15	Germany	Astrid Hänschen; Cornelia Pfohl; Marion Wagner	3691
16	Japan	Keiko Nakagomi; Reiko Fujita; Yukiko Ikeda	3680
17	Bhutan	Karma Tshomo; Pem Tshering; Namgyal Lhamu	3336

=== Knockout stage ===
Round of 16
1	South Korea	244
16	Japan	222
8	Sweden	239
9	Great Britain	229
5	France	236
12	Indonesia	235
4	United States	235
13	Hungary	222
3	China	230*
14	Netherlands	230
11	North Korea	234
6	Chinese Taipei	231
7	Turkey	235
10	Poland	213
2	Unified Team	242
15	Germany	234

Quarterfinals
1	South Korea	240*
8	Sweden	240
5	France	234
4	United States	225
3	China	235
11	North Korea	227
7	Turkey	228
2	Unified Team	242

Semifinals
1	South Korea	246
5	France	221
3	China	224*
2	Unified Team	224

Final
1	South Korea	236
3	China	224
Bronze medal match
2	Unified Team	240
5	France	222

== Sources ==
- Official Report
- Wudarski, Pawel (1999). "Wyniki Igrzysk Olimpijskich" (in Polish). Archived from the original on 18 January 2008.
