= Indonesia at the 1992 Summer Olympics =

- IOC code: INA
- NOC: Indonesian Olympic Committee

in Barcelona
- Competitors: 42 in 10 sports
- Flag bearer: Christian Hadinata
- Medals Ranked 24th: Gold 2 Silver 2 Bronze 1 Total 5

Summer Olympics appearances (overview)
- 1952; 1956; 1960; 1964; 1968; 1972; 1976; 1980; 1984; 1988; 1992; 1996; 2000; 2004; 2008; 2012; 2016; 2020; 2024; 2028

Other related appearances
- Individual Olympic Athletes (2000); Timor-Leste (2004–pres.)

Indonesia competed at the 1992 Summer Olympics in Barcelona, Spain. 42 competitors, 27 men and 15 women, took part in 31 events in 10 sports. They won both Men's and Women's singles as their first gold medal here from badminton that appeared for the first time at the summer Olympics. They made it the first time Indonesia won gold at the Olympics, and also made Indonesia the first Southeast Asian country to win gold. Alan Budikusuma and Susi Susanti, who later married, had the Olympic anthem played on their wedding day.

== Medalists ==
Medal	Name	Sport	Event	Date
Gold	Susi Susanti	Badminton	Women's singles	4 August
Gold	Alan Budikusuma	Badminton	Men's singles	4 August
Silver	Ardy Wiranata	Badminton	Men's singles	4 August
Silver	Eddy Hartono; Rudy Gunawan	Badminton	Men's doubles	4 August
Bronze	Hermawan Susanto	Badminton	Men's singles	4 August

Medals by sport
Sport	1st place, gold medalist(s)	2nd place, silver medalist(s)	3rd place, bronze medalist(s)	Total
Badminton	2	2	1	5
Total	2	2	1	5

Medals by gender
Gender	1st place, gold medalist(s)	2nd place, silver medalist(s)	3rd place, bronze medalist(s)	Total
Female	1	0	0	1
Male	1	2	1	4
Mixed	0	0	0	0
Total	2	2	1	5

Medals by date
Date	1st place, gold medalist(s)	2nd place, silver medalist(s)	3rd place, bronze medalist(s)	Total
4 August	2	2	1	5
Total	2	2	1	5

== Competitors ==
The following is the list of number of competitors participating in the Games:

Sport	Men	Women	Total
Archery	1	3	4
Badminton	7	6	13
Boxing	2	0	2
Canoeing	3	0	3
Cycling	2	0	2
Fencing	2	0	2
Judo	2	2	4
Table tennis	1	2	3
Tennis	3	2	5
Weightlifting	4	0	4
Total	27	15	42

== Archery ==
Only one of the women who had won Indonesia's first Olympic medal returned in 1992. Two of the three Olympic rookie women did not advance into the elimination round, while the one that did was defeated in her first match. In the men's competition, Hendra Setijawan advanced to the quarterfinals before being defeated.

Athlete	Event	Ranking round		Round of 32	Round of 16	Quarterfinals	Semifinals	Final / BM	
Athlete	Event	Score	Seed	Opposition Score	Opposition Score	Opposition Score	Opposition Score	Opposition Score	Rank
Hendra Setijawan	Men's individual	1309	8	Fu SJ (CHN); W 106–96	Zabrodsky (EUN); W 104–102	Chung J-h (KOR); L 104–106	Did not advance		
Purnama Pandiangan	Women's individual	1270	30	Nowicka (POL); L 100–102	Did not advance				
Nurfitriyana Saiman	Women's individual	1270	33	Did not advance					
Rusena Gelanteh	Women's individual	1257	40	Did not advance					
Purnama Pandiangan; Nurfitriyana Saiman; Rusena Gelanteh	Women's team	3797	12	—N/a	France; L 235–236	Did not advance			

== Badminton ==
Men

Athlete	Event	Round of 64	Round of 32	Round of 16	Quarterfinal	Semifinal	Final / BM	
Athlete	Event	Opposition Score	Opposition Score	Opposition Score	Opposition Score	Opposition Score	Opposition Score	Rank
Ardy Wiranata	Singles	Bye	Olsson (SWE); W 15–11, 15–6	Foo (MAS); W 15–4, 15–6	Høyer (DEN); W 15–10, 15–12	Susanto (INA); W 10–15, 15–9, 15–9	Budikusuma (INA); L 12–15, 13–18	2nd place, silver medalist(s)
Alan Budikusuma	Singles	Koh (SGP); W 15–2, 15–2	Kukasemkij (THA); W 15–11, 15–2	Antropov (EUN); W 15–4, 15–7	Kim (KOR); W 15–9, 15–4	Stuer-Lauridsen (DEN); W 18–14, 15–8	Wiranata (INA); W 15–12, 18–13	1st place, gold medalist(s)
Hermawan Susanto	Singles	Bye	Liljequist (FIN); W 15–11, 15–3	Chiangta (THA); W 15–7, 15–8	Zhao (CHN); W 15–2, 14–17, 17–14	Wiranata (INA); L 15–10, 9–15, 9–15	—N/a	3rd place, bronze medalist(s)
Eddy Hartono; Rudy Gunawan	Doubles	—N/a	Bye	Lee / Reidy (USA); W 15–3, 15–6	Lee / Shon (KOR); W 15–4, 18–15	Li / Tian (CHN); W 15–9, 15–8	Kim / Park (KOR); L 11–15, 7–15	2nd place, silver medalist(s)
Rexy Mainaky; Ricky Subagja	Doubles	—N/a	Axelsson / Jönsson (SWE); W 15–5, 15–11	Ponting / Wright (GBR); W 15–3, 15–9	Kim / Park (KOR); L 7–15, 4–15	Did not advance		

Women

Athlete	Event	Round of 64	Round of 32	Round of 16	Quarterfinal	Semifinal	Final / BM	
Athlete	Event	Opposition Score	Opposition Score	Opposition Score	Opposition Score	Opposition Score	Opposition Score	Rank
Susi Susanti	Singles	Bye	Kohara (JPN); W 11–2, 11–2	Wong (HKG); W 11–4, 11–2	Jaroensiri (THA); W 11–6, 11–1	Huang (CHN); W 11–4, 11–1	Bang (KOR); W 5–11, 11–5, 11–3	1st place, gold medalist(s)
Sarwendah Kusumawardhani	Singles	Bye	van den Heuvel (NED); W 11–8, 11–2	Plungwech (THA); W 11–4, 11–2	Bang (KOR); L 2–11, 11–3, 11–12	Did not advance		
Finarsih; Lili Tampi	Doubles	—N/a	Haracz / Syta (POL); W 15–1, 15–9	Matsuo / Sasage (JPN); W 15–11, 15–8	Gil / Shim (KOR); L 8–15, 3–15	Did not advance		
Erma Sulistianingsih; Rosiana Tendean	Doubles	—N/a	Bradbury / Clark (GBR); L 10–15, 15–4, 15–17	Did not advance				

== Boxing ==
Athlete	Event	Round of 32	Round of 16	Quarterfinals	Semifinals	Final	
Athlete	Event	Opposition Result	Opposition Result	Opposition Result	Opposition Result	Opposition Result	Rank
Hendrik Simangunsong	Light Middleweight	Downey (CAN); W 12–5	Mizsei (HUN); L 5–17	Did not advance			
Alberth Papilaya	Middleweight	Buda (POL); W 11–5	Isangula (TAN); W 13–6	Lee (KOR); L 3–15	Did not advance		

== Canoeing ==
Sprint

Athlete	Event	Heats		Repechage		Semifinals		Final	
Athlete	Event	Time	Rank	Time	Rank	Time	Rank	Time	Rank
Anisi	Men's K-1 500 m	1:51.96	7 QR	1:51.69	7	Did not advance			
Anisi	Men's K-1 1000 m	4:06.90	6 QR	3:54.36	7	Did not advance			
Abdul Razak; Abdul Karim	Men's K-2 500 m	1:43.81	6 QR	1:41.23	6	Did not advance			
Abdul Razak; Abdul Karim	Men's K-2 1000 m	3:29.88	7 QR	3:26.64	6	Did not advance			

Qualification Legend: QR = Qualify to Repechages; q = Qualify to semifinal

== Cycling ==
=== Track ===
Two male cyclists represented Indonesia in 1992.

Men's sprint

- Tulus Widodo Kalimanto - (2nd round repechage)

Men's 1 km time trial

- Herry Janto Setiawan - (27th place)

== Fencing ==
Two male fencers represented Indonesia in 1992.

Men's épée

- Handry Lenzun
- Lucas Zakaria

== Judo ==
Men's Lightweight 71 kg

- Wahid Yudhi Sulistianto - (22T)

Men's Half-Heavyweight 95 kg

- Hengky Pie - (32T)

Women's Middleweight 66 kg

- Helena Miagian Papilaya - (13T)

Women's Half-Heavyweight 72 kg

- Pujawati Utama - (13T)

== Table tennis ==
Men's singles

- Anton Suseno - 3 of 4, Group M

Women's singles

- Ling Ling Agustin - 3 of 4, Group E
- Rossy Pratiwi Dipoyanti - 2 of 4, Group I

Women's doubles

- Ling Ling Agustin / Rossy Pratiwi Dipoyanti - 3 of 4, Group H

== Tennis ==
Athlete	Event	Round of 64	Round of 32	Round of 16	Quarterfinals	Semifinals	Final / BM	
Athlete	Event	Opposition Score	Opposition Score	Opposition Score	Opposition Score	Opposition Score	Opposition Score	Rank
Benny Wijaya	Men's singles	Sznajder (CAN); L 2–6, 4–6, 5-7	Did not advance					
Hary Suharyadi; Bonit Wiryawan	Men's doubles	—N/a	Chang / Kim (KOR); W 6–1, 6–7 (6–8), 4–6, 6–3, 6–2	Ivanišević / Prpić (CRO); L 5–7, 2–6, 2–6	Did not advance			
Yayuk Basuki	Women's singles	Paz (ARG); W 6–1, 6–4	Pierce (FRA); W 0–6, 6–3, 10–8	Capriati (USA); L 3–6, 4–6	Did not advance			
Suzanna Wibowo; Yayuk Basuki	Women's doubles	—N/a	Graf / Huber (GER); L 2–6, 3–6	Did not advance				

== Weightlifting ==
Athlete	Event	Snatch		Clean & Jerk		Total	Rank
Athlete	Event	Result	Rank	Result	Rank	Total	Rank
Enosh Depthios	Flyweight	97.5	=13	~~127.5~~	DNF	—	DNF
Sodikin	Bantamweight	110.0	=10	140.0	=6	250.0	10
Sugiono Katijo	Featherweight	117.5	=14	150.0	=11	267.5	14
I Nyoman Sudarma	Middleweight	140.0	=20	175.0	=20	315.0	23

== See also ==
- 1992 Paralympic Games
- Indonesia at the Olympics
- Indonesia at the Paralympics
