= Boxing at the 1992 Summer Olympics – Middleweight =

Middleweight boxing at the Games of the XXV Olympiad
- Venue: Pavelló Club Joventut Badalona
- Dates: 28 July – 8 August
- Competitors: 28 from 28 nations

Medalists
| 1st place, gold medalist(s) | | Ariel Hernández | Cuba |
| 2nd place, silver medalist(s) | | Chris Byrd | United States |
| 3rd place, bronze medalist(s) | | Chris Johnson | Canada |
| 3rd place, bronze medalist(s) | | Lee Seung-bae | South Korea |

The men's middleweight event was part of the boxing programme at the 1992 Summer Olympics. The weight class allowed boxers of up to 75 kilograms to compete. The competition was held from 28 July to 8 August 1992. 28 boxers from 28 nations competed.

== Medalists ==
| Gold | Ariel Hernández; Cuba |
| Silver | Chris Byrd; United States |
| Bronze | Chris Johnson; Canada |
| Bronze | Lee Seung-bae; South Korea |

== Results ==
The following boxers took part in the event:

| Rank | Name | Country |
|---|---|---|
| 1 | Ariel Hernández | Cuba |
| 2 | Chris Byrd | United States |
| 3T | Chris Johnson | Canada |
| 3T | Lee Seung-bae | South Korea |
| 5T | Stefan Trendafilov | Bulgaria |
| 5T | Ahmed Dine | Algeria |
| 5T | Sven Ottke | Germany |
| 5T | Albert Papilaya | Indonesia |
| 9T | Chao Lu | China |
| 9T | Mohamed Siluvangi | Zaire |
| 9T | Aleksandr Lebzyak | Unified Team |
| 9T | Raymond Joval | Netherlands |
| 9T | Brian Lentz | Denmark |
| 9T | Gilberto Brown | Virgin Islands |
| 9T | Makoye Isangula | Tanzania |
| 9T | Ricardo Araneda | Chile |
| 17T | Mark Edwards | Great Britain |
| 17T | Justann Crawford | Australia |
| 17T | Tommaso Russo | Italy |
| 17T | Likou Aliu | Western Samoa |
| 17T | Richard Santiago | Puerto Rico |
| 17T | Bandiin Altangerel | Mongolia |
| 17T | Lotfi Missaoui | Tunisia |
| 17T | Joseph Laryea | Ghana |
| 17T | Siamak Varzideh | Iran |
| 17T | Robert Buda | Poland |
| 17T | Luis Méndez | Uruguay |
| 17T | Michal Franek | Czechoslovakia |

=== First round ===
- Stefan Trendafilov (BUL) – BYE
- Lu Chao (CHN) – BYE
- Chris Johnson (CAN) – BYE
- Mohamed Siluvangi (ZAI) – BYE
- Chris Byrd (USA) def. Mark Edwards (GBR), 21:3
- Aleksandr Lebziak (EUN) def. Justann Crawford (AUS), RSCH-3 (01:56)
- Ahmed Dine (ALG) def. Tommaso Russo (ITA), 6:4
- Raymond Joval (NED) def. Likou Aliu (SAM), RSC-3 (01:30)
- Sven Ottke (GER) def. Richard Santiago (PUR), 15:2
- Brian Lentz (DEN) def. Bandj Altangerel (MGL), 4:0
- Gilberto Brown (ISV) def. Lotfi Missaoui (TUN), 6:4
- Ariel Hernández (CUB) def. Joseph Lareya (GHA), 6:0
- Makoye Isangula (TAN) def. Siamak Varzideh (IRN), RSC-1 (01:58)
- Albert Papilaya (INA) def. Robert Buda (POL), 11:5
- Ricardo Araneda (CHI) def. Luis Hugo Mendez (URU), RSC-2 (02:20)
- Lee Seung-Bae (KOR) def. Michal Franek (TCH), 6:2

=== Second round ===
- Stefan Trendafilov (BUL) def. Lu Chao (CHN), RSC-1 (01:45)
- Chris Johnson (CAN) def. Mohamed Siluvangi (ZAI), RSCH-3 (02:39)
- Chris Byrd (USA) def. Aleksandr Lebziak (EUN), 16:7
- Ahmed Dine (ALG) def. Raymond Joval (NED), 22:14
- Sven Ottke (GER) def. Brian Lentz (DEN), 9:2
- Ariel Hernández (CUB) def. Gilberto Brown (ISV), 13:2
- Albert Papilaya (INA) def. Makoye Isangula (TAN), 13:6
- Lee Seung-Bae (KOR) def. Ricardo Araneda (CHI), 12:8

=== Quarterfinals ===
- Chris Johnson (CAN) def. Stefan Trendafilov (BUL), RSC-1 (02:52)
- Chris Byrd (USA) def. Ahmed Dine (ALG), 21:2
- Ariel Hernández (CUB) def. Sven Ottke (GER), 14:6
- Lee Seung-Bae (KOR) def. Albert Papilaya (INA), 15:3

=== Semifinals ===
- Chris Byrd (USA) def. Chris Johnson (CAN), 17:3
- Ariel Hernández (CUB) def. Lee Seung-Bae (KOR), 14:1

=== Final ===
- Ariel Hernández (CUB) def. Chris Byrd (USA), 12:7
