= Judit Kovács (archer) =

Hungarian archer (born 1956)

Judit Kovács (born 7 January 1956) is a Hungarian former archer who competed in archery for Hungary at three Olympic Games.

== Career ==
At the 1980 Summer Olympic Games, Kovács finished twelfth in the women's individual event with a score of 2323 points.

In 1992, Kovács returned to the Olympics. Under the new format for archery she scored 1304 points in the ranking round in the women's individual event making her the sixteenth seed for the 32 player knockout round. Kovács defeated Wang Hong 103–93 in round one before losing to the eventual gold medalist Cho Youn-jeong 113–97 in the second round. She came sixteenth overall. Alongside Marina Szendey and Tímea Kiss she lost 235–222 to the United States in the women's team event.

At the 1996 Summer Olympic Games, Kovács finished 39th in the ranking round with 633 points. She lost to Kirstin Jean Lewis 10–7 on a tie break after a 150–150 draw.
