= Chinese Taipei at the 1992 Summer Olympics =

- Chinese Taipei Olympic flag
- IOC code: TPE
- NOC: Chinese Taipei Olympic Committee

in Barcelona
- Competitors: 31 (23 men, 8 women) in 7 sports
- Flag bearer: Wang Kuang-Shih
- Medals Ranked 49th: Gold 0 Silver 1 Bronze 0 Total 1

Summer Olympics appearances (overview)
- 1956; 1960; 1964; 1968; 1972; 1976–1980; 1984; 1988; 1992; 1996; 2000; 2004; 2008; 2012; 2016; 2020; 2024

Other related appearances
- Republic of China (1924–1948)

The Republic of China competed as Chinese Taipei at the 1992 Summer Olympics in Barcelona, Spain. 31 competitors, 23 men and 8 women, took part in 15 events in 7 sports.

== Medalists ==
Medal	Name	Sport	Event	Date
Silver	Chinese Taipei national baseball team: Chang Cheng-hsien; Chang Wen-chung; Chang Yaw-teing; Chen Chi-hsin; Chen Wei-chen; Chiang Tai-chuan; Huang Chung-yi; Huang Wen-po; Jong Yeu-jeng; Ku Kuo-chian; Kuo Lee Chien-fu; Liao Ming-hsiung; Lin Chao-huang; Lin Kun-han; Lo Chen-jung; Lo Kuo-chung; Pai Kun-hong; Tsai Ming-hung; Wang Kuang-shih; Wu Shih-hsin	Baseball	Men's tournament	5 August

== Competitors ==
The following is the list of number of competitors in the Games.

Sport	Men	Women	Total
Archery	0	3	3
Athletics	0	2	2
Baseball	20	–	20
Cycling	1	0	1
Judo	0	2	2
Shooting	1	1	2
Weightlifting	1	–	1
Total	23	8	31

== Archery ==
Chinese Taipei entered three women in the archery competition. The two that qualified for the elimination rounds each won their first match, with one winning a second match before being defeated in the quarterfinal. The team was upset by DPR Korea in the team round.

Women's individual:

- Lai Fang-Mei – quarterfinal, 7th place (2–1)
- Lin Yi-Yin – round of 16, 13th place (1–1)
- Liu Pi-Yu – ranking round, 51st place (0–0)

Women's team:

- Lai, Lin, and Liu – round of 16, 11th place (0–1)

== Baseball ==
Chinese Taipei was among the eight teams to play in the inaugural Olympic baseball tournament. They won five of their seven preliminary round games, including one against Japan, but lost to the United States and Cuba to place second in the round. In the semifinal, Taipei faced Japan again, defeating the Japanese team one more time. The final against Cuba resulted in an 11–1 loss, and a silver medal, for the Chinese Taipei team.

Men's:

- Chinese Taipei – silver medal (6–3)

Rosters:

- Lin Chao-Huang (P,林朝煌)
- Lin Kun-Han (SS,林琨瀚)
- Wang Kuang-Shih (1B.王光熙)
- Chen Wei-Chen (RF,陳威成)
- Huang Wen-Po (P,黃文博)
- Wu Shih-Hsih (3B,吳思賢)
- Chang Yaw-Teing (SS,張耀騰)
- Liao Ming-Hsiung (CF,廖敏雄)
- Lo Kuo-Chong (SS,羅國璋)
- Huang Chung-Yi (2B,黃忠義)
- Lo Chen-Jung (P,羅振榮)
- Chen Chi-Hsin (C,陳執信)
- Chiang Tai-Chuan (LF,江泰權)
- Pai Kun-Hong (C,白昆弘)
- Kuo Lee Chien-Fu (P,郭李建夫)
- Ku Kuo-Chian (SS,古國謙)
- Tsai Ming-Hung (P,蔡明宏)
- Chang Cheng-Hsien (C,張正憲)
- Chang Wen-Chung (RF,張文宗)
- Jong Yeu-Jeng (P,鍾宇政)

== Cycling ==
One male cyclist represented Chinese Taipei in 1992.

Men's road race

- Weng Yu-yi

Men's individual pursuit

- Weng Yu-yi

Men's points race

- Weng Yu-yi
