= Baseball at the 1990 Asian Games =

- Venue: Fengtai Softball Field
- Dates: 3–5 October 1990
- Competitors: 72 from 4 nations

Baseball was contested by four teams Chinese Taipei, Japan, South Korea and China as a demonstration sport at the 1990 Asian Games in Fengtai Softball Field, Beijing, China from 3 October to 5 October 1990.

Chinese Taipei won the competition with a 2–1 record. South Korea and Japan finished second and third with the same record, the host nation China finished last without winning a match.

== Medalists ==
Event	Gold	Silver	Bronze
Men	Chinese Taipei; Chang Cheng-hsien; Chang Wen-tsung; Chang Yao-teng; Chen Wei-chen; Chiang Tai-chuan; Hsu Wen-chien; Huang Chung-yi; Ku Kuo-chian; Kuo Lee Chien-fu; Liao Ming-hsiung; Lin Chao-huang; Liu Chih-sheng; Lo Chen-jung; Lo Kuo-chong; Tsai Ming-hung; Tseng Kuei-chang; Wang Kuang-shih; Yang Chang-hsin	South Korea; Baek Jae-woo; Chung Min-tae; Go Jang-ryang; Jang Kwang-ho; Ji Yeon-kyu; Kang Seong-woo; Kim Do-wan; Kim Hong-jib; Kim Ki-tai; Kim Min-kuk; Lee Jong-beom; Lee Min-hwo; Lee Young-seok; Lim Chang-sik; Park Jong-tae; Son Dong-il; Yang Joon-hyuk; Yu Ji-hyeon	Japan; Osamu Adachi; Kazuya Harai; Masahiko Jozume; Kojiro Machida; Tetsuya Nagano; Masato Naito; Hiroshi Nakamoto; Masafumi Nishi; Kazutaka Nishiyama; Eiji Ochiai; Shinichi Sato; Yuki Sato; Masanori Sugiura; Yoshinori Sumiyoshi; Ken Suzuki; Yasunori Takami; Shigeki Wakabayashi; Kenichi Wakatabe

== Results ==
Pos	Team	Pld	W	L	RF	RA	PCT	GB
1	Chinese Taipei	3	2	1	18	8	.667	—
2	South Korea	3	2	1	14	8	.667	—
3	Japan	3	2	1	19	11	.667	—
4	China	3	0	3	6	30	.000	2

3 October	Japan	4–3	Chinese Taipei	Fengtai Softball Field, Beijing

Team	1	2	3	4	5	6	7	8	9	R
Chinese Taipei	0	0	1	0	2	0	0	0	0	3
Japan	2	1	0	0	0	1	0	0	X	4

3 October	South Korea	7–1	China	Fengtai Softball Field, Beijing

Team	1	2	3	4	5	6	7	8	9	R
China	0	0	0	1	0	0	0	0	0	1
South Korea	0	2	0	3	1	0	1	0	X	7

4 October	South Korea	4–1	Japan	Fengtai Softball Field, Beijing

Team	1	2	3	4	5	6	7	8	9	R
Japan	0	0	0	0	0	0	0	1	0	1
South Korea	0	0	1	1	0	2	0	0	X	4

4 October	Chinese Taipei	9–1	China	Fengtai Softball Field, Beijing

Team	1	2	3	4	5	6	7	8	9	R
China	0	0	0	1	0	0	0	0	0	1
Chinese Taipei	2	2	1	0	1	0	1	2	X	9

5 October	Japan	14–4 (F/7)	China	Fengtai Softball Field, Beijing

Team	1	2	3	4	5	6	7	8	9	R
China	1	2	0	0	1	0	0	—	—	4
Japan	1	1	7	1	0	3	1	—	—	14

5 October	South Korea	3–6	Chinese Taipei	Fengtai Softball Field, Beijing

Team	1	2	3	4	5	6	7	8	9	R
Chinese Taipei	3	0	0	1	0	2	0	0	0	6
South Korea	0	0	0	0	2	0	1	0	0	3
