= Truus Smulders-Beliën =

Dutch politician and teacher (1902–1966)

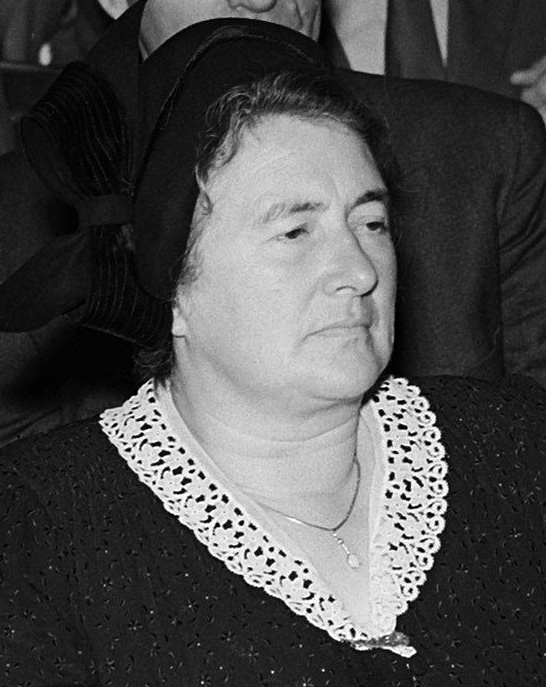
- Smulders-Beliën in 1951

Mayor of Oost-, West- en Middelbeers
- In office 16 April 1946 – 11 June 1966

Geertruida Catharina Theresia Maria "Truus" Smulders-Beliën (née Beliën; 20 November 1902 – 11 June 1966) was a Dutch politician and teacher who was the mayor of Oost-, West- en Middelbeers in North Brabant from 1946 to 1966. The first female mayor in the Netherlands, she succeeded her husband Jan Smulders after he was executed by Nazi soldiers.

== Biography ==
Geertruida Catharina Theresia Maria Beliën was born on 20 November 1902 in Oirschot, Netherlands, the eldest of nine children of Johannes Josephus Beliën and Geertruida Wilhelmina van Rhijn. After studying with the Franciscan Sisters of Oirschot, she became a teacher in Oirschot and Eindhoven schools in 1924. In 1926, she met Jan Smulders, who would become mayor of Oost-, West- en Middelbeers the following year. They were engaged in 1931 and married on 28 August 1932, and had four children: Geertruida Maria Catharina Wilhelmina (born 1933), Antonius Josephus Maria Petrus (born 1934), Joanna Maria Louise (born 1937), and Johannes Josephus Wilhelmus (born 1940).

Jan was arrested by Nazi forces in July 1944 for refusing to provide the names of potential conscripts. He was sent to the Herzogenbusch concentration camp with other mayors, leaving Truus and their four children in Middelbeers. He was executed in April 1945. After she learned of Jan's death, Truus applied for the position of mayor, writing letters of interest to Minister of the Interior Louis Beel, Queen's Commissioner Johannes Theodorus Maria Smits van Oyen, and Queen Wilhelmina. With the support of Beel, who had previously written to her to express his condolences, Smulders-Beliën became mayor on 16 April 1946. She was the first female mayor in the Netherlands, and would be the only female mayor in the country until 1964. She was re-appointed as mayor in 1952, 1958, and 1964, and was a Catholic People's Party member of the Provincial Council of North Brabant beginning in 1950.

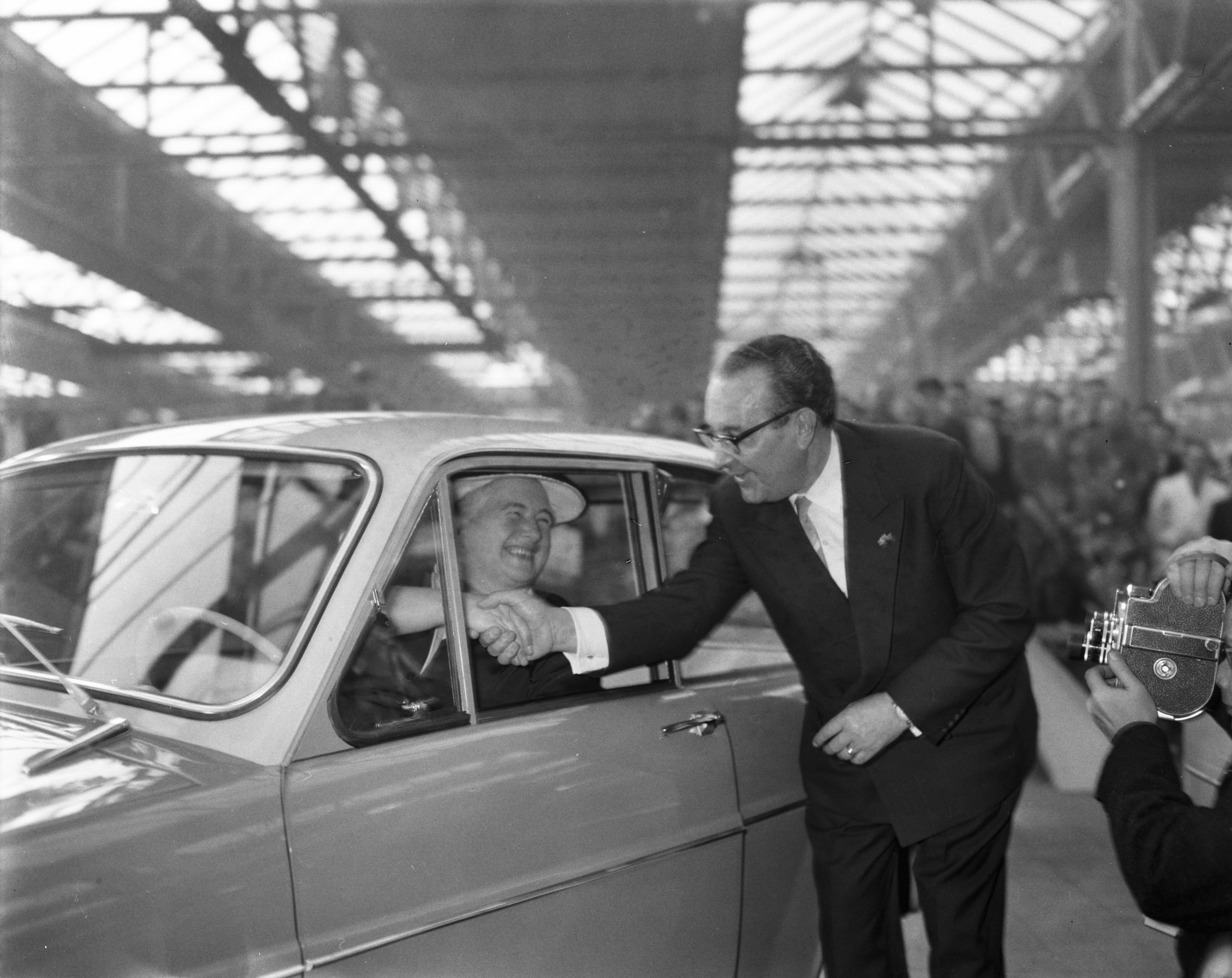
in her new DAF 600

In 1959 the first DAF 600 cars were manufactured and she and the chair of the Dutch automobile club were given the first two cars off the production line. She had been chosen because she was known and she appeared to have ordered one. She agreed after it was realised that it was her staff who had ordered it and the mayor did not have a driving license.

In 1966, Smulders-Beliën was admitted to the Groot Ziekengasthuis hospital in 's-Hertogenbosch due to surgical complications from a cervical cancer operation. She died on 11 June 1966, at the age of 63. Her funeral was held on 15 June 1966 at St. Willibrord Church in Middelbeers. A statue of Smulders-Beliën, commissioned in part by the municipality of Oirschot, was erected in 2002, the 100th anniversary of her birth.

== See also ==
- Widow's succession
