= Luis Méndez =

Luis Méndez may refer to:

- Luis Méndez (boxer) (born 1969), Uruguayan boxer
- Luis Méndez (Bolivian footballer) (born 1985), Bolivian football centre back
- Luis Méndez (sport shooter) (born 1959), Uruguayan sports shooter
- Luis Gerardo Méndez (born 1982), Mexican actor and producer
- Luis Enrique Méndez (born 1973), Cuban Greco-Roman wrestler
- Luis Soto Mendez (born 1995), Costa Rican artistic gymnast
