= Patricia Obregón =

Patricia Obregón may refer to:

- Patricia Obregón (swimmer)
- Patricia Obregón (archer)
