= Zehra Öktem =

Turkish archer (born 1959)

Personal information
- Full name: Zehra Öktem
- Nationality: Turkish
- Born: Zehra Öktem; September 4, 1959 (age 66) Trabzon, Turkey

Sport
- Country: Turkey
- Sport: Archery
Medal record
Women's Archery
World Masters Games
Gold medal – first place	2009 Sydney	Ind field
Gold medal – first place	2009 Sydney	Ind indoors

Zehra Öktem (born September 4, 1959 in Trabzon, Turkey) is a Turkish female Olympian archer. She resides in Antalya.

She graduated from Istanbul Technical University with a degree in chemical engineering. Öktem became a member of the national team at the age of 30. In the 1990s, she won five times (1990, 1991, 1992, 1994 and 1998) the gold medal at the Balkan Championship.

Zehra Öktem represented Turkey at the 1992 Summer Olympics and placed 30th in the Individual round of 32 event. Lastly, she took two gold medals at the 2009 World Masters Games in Sydney, Australia in individual field and indoors. At the same tournament, Öktem set also a world record in 30m event of her age category (over 50 years) with a score of 345.

== See also ==
- Archery at the 1992 Summer Olympics – Women's individual
- Archery at the 1992 Summer Olympics – Women's team
