= Raymond Joval =

Dutch boxer

Raymond "Hallelujah" Joval
Personal information
- Nickname: Hallelujah
- Nationality: Dutch
- Born: Raymond Albert Joval; 15 September 1968 (age 57) Amsterdam
- Weight: Middleweight

Boxing career
- Stance: Orthodox

Boxing record
- Total fights: 42
- Wins: 37
- Win by KO: 16
- Losses: 5
- Draws: 0
- No contests: 0

Raymond Joval
Medal record

Representing Netherlands

Men's Boxing

World Amateur Championships
Bronze medal – third place	Tampere 1993	Middleweight

Raymond "Hallelujah" Joval (born 15 September 1968) is a Dutch professional boxer who held the International Boxing Organization middleweight title from 2000 to 2004 and again from 2005 to 2006.

Joval represented the Netherlands at the 1992 Olympics, defeating Likou Aliu of Western Samoa before being eliminated by Ahmed Dine of Algeria.

He has a career professional record of 37 wins and 5 defeats. His first professional fight was on 8 January 1994. Joval became the IBO Middleweight Champion after he defeated Mpush Makambi on 30 September 2000. He relinquished the title in 2004. He became IBO Middleweight champion once more, from 2005 until relinquishing it again in 2006.

== Professional boxing record ==
42 fights	37 wins	5 losses
By knockout	16	0
By decision	20	5
By disqualification	1	0

No.	Result	Record	Opponent	Type	Round, time	Date	Location	Notes
42	Loss	37–5	(United States) James McGirt	UD	10	25 Jul 2008	(United States) Saratoga Springs City Center, Saratoga Springs, New York, U.S.	
41	Win	37–4	(France) Alban Mothie	UD	8	8 Oct 2007	Royal Theatre Carré, Amsterdam, Netherlands	
40	Win	36–4	(United States) Willie Gibs	UD	10	11 Apr 2007	(United States) Paradise Theater, The Bronx, New York, U.S.	
39	Win	35–4	(Australia) Shannan Taylor	TKO	10 (12), 2:04	27 Nov 2005	Vodafone Arena, Melbourne Park, Melbourne, Australia	Retained IBO middleweight title
38	Win	34–4	(Belgium) Lansana Diallo	UD	12	3 Jul 2005	Zuidpalleis, Brussels, Belgium	Won vacant IBO middleweight title
37	Loss	33–4	(United States) Fernando Vargas	UD	10	26 Mar 2005	(United States) American Bank Center, Corpus Christi, Texas, U.S.	
36	Win	33–3	(United States) Rodrigues Moungo	TKO	3 (8), 2:22	21 Jan 2005	(United States) Mohegan Sun Casino, Uncasville, Connecticut, U.S.	Referee stops contest on advice of ringside physician
35	Loss	32–3	(Australia) Sam Soliman	UD	12	18 Jul 2004	(United States) Pechanga Resort & Casino, Temecula, California, U.S.	
34	Win	32–2	(Mexico) Ángel Hernández	TD	8 (10)	6 Feb 2004	(United States) Desert Diamond Casino, Tucson, Arizona, U.S.	Unanimous TD
33	Win	31–2	(Belgium) Lansana Diallo	UD	12	27 Sep 2003	Spiroudome Arena, Charleroi, Belgium	Retained IBO middleweight title
32	Win	30–2	(Argentina) Francisco Antonio Mora	UD	12	26 Jan 2003	Sporthal de Mijze, Schermerhorn, Netherlands	Retained IBO middleweight title
31	Win	29–2	(France) Pascal Minietti	UD	8	2 May 2002	Rijnhal, Arnhem, Netherlands	
30	Win	28–2	(Kenya) Joseph Njoka Ngandu	UD	8	14 Dec 2001	E.M. Sporthall, Budapest, Hungary	
29	Win	27–2	(South Africa) Mpush Makambi	MD	12	7 Jul 2001	Jaap Edenhal, Amsterdam, Netherlands	Retained IBO middleweight title
28	Win	26–2	(Brazil) Roberto Martins	TKO	8 (10)	27 Apr 2001	Paramaribo, Suriname	
27	Win	25–2	(Australia) Sam Soliman	MD	12	27 Jan 2001	Jaap Edenhal, Amsterdam, Netherlands	Retained IBO middleweight title
26	Win	24–2	(South Africa) Mpush Makambi	MD	12	30 Sep 2000	Sportcomplex de Wilgenring, Rotterdam, Netherlands	Won IBO middleweight title
25	Loss	23–2	(Italy) Antonio Perugino	UD	12	13 Dec 1999	(Italy) Caserta, Campania	Lost WBU middleweight title
24	Win	23–1	(Italy) Agostino Cardamone	TKO	9 (12)	26 Jun 1999	Benevento, Campania, Italy	Won WBU middleweight title
23	Win	22–1	(Serbia) Gradimir Andrić	TKO	6 (8)	5 Mar 1999	Sondermarkshallen, Give, Denmark	
22	Win	21–1	(Hungary) Csaba Oláh	TKO	4 (8)	17 Nov 1998	Aarhus Stadionhal, Aarhus, Denmark	
21	Win	20–1	(Belgium) Danny Defevere	TKO	9 (12)	25 Sep 1998	Congresgebouw, Den Haag, Netherlands	Won vacant IBO Inter-Continental middleweight title
20	Win	19–1	(Algeria) Mohamed Boualleg	UD	8	22 Jul 1998	Outrup Speedwaybane, Outrup, Denmark	
19	Win	18–1	(Italy) Ilir Mustafa	TKO	2 (?)	20 Dec 1997	Amsterdam, North Holland, Netherlands	
18	Win	17–1	(England) Colin Manners	UD	12	26 Sep 1997	Everton Park Sports Centre, Liverpool, England	
17	Loss	16–1	(France) Erland Betare	PTS	10	19 Nov 1996	Chenôve, Côte-d'Or, France	
16	Win	16–0	(Hungary) József Zoltán Nagy	KO	1 (8)	6 Sep 1996	Everton Park Sports Centre, Liverpool, England	
15	Win	15–0	(Belgium) Hassan Mokhtar	PTS	10	3 Jun 1996	Indoorsportcentrum, Eindhoven, Netherlands	Retained BeNeLux middleweight title
14	Win	14–0	(Belgium) Hassan Mokhtar	PTS	10	23 Dec 1995	RAI, Amsterdam, Netherlands	Won BeNeLux middleweight title
13	Win	13–0	(United States) Alphonso Dyer	KO	4 (8), 2:08	8 Nov 1995	(United States) Hyatt Regency Hotel, Baltimore, Maryland, U.S.	
12	Win	12–0	(Belgium) Philip Van Geert	TKO	1 (8)	16 Sep 1995	Sportcentrum Valkenhuizen, Arnhem, Netherlands	
11	Win	11–0	(Belgium) Bruno Wuestenberghs	DQ	4 (?)	12 Aug 1995	Zaandam, Holland, Netherlands	
10	Win	10–0	(United States) Earl Allen	UD	6	22 Apr 1995	(United States) Ballys Park Place Hotel Casino, Atlantic City, New Jersey, U.S.	
9	Win	9–0	(United States) James Hobart	KO	1 (?)	1 Apr 1995	(United States) Charlotte, North Carolina, U.S.	
8	Win	8–0	(United States) Ron Woodley	PTS	4	28 Jan 1995	(United States) Ballys Park Place Hotel Casino, Atlantic City, New Jersey, U.S.	
7	Win	7–0	(United States) Greg Cadiz	TKO	3 (6)	10 Dec 1994	(United States) Cumberland County Civic Center, Portland, Maine, U.S.	
6	Win	6–0	(United States) Caseny Truesdale	TKO	4 (?)	22 Oct 1994	(United States) Ballys Park Place Hotel Casino, Atlantic City, New Jersey, U.S.	
5	Win	5–0	(Puerto Rico) Edwin Rodríguez	UD	6	24 Sep 1994	(United States) Ballys Park Place Hotel Casino, Atlantic City, New Jersey, U.S.	
4	Win	4–0	(Dominican Republic) Apolinar Hernández	PTS	4	31 Mar 1994	(United States) Huntington Hilton Hotel, Melville, New York, U.S.	
3	Win	3–0	(United States) Mark Simmons	TKO	2 (?)	4 Mar 1994	(United States) Hotel Pennsylvania, Manhattan, New York, U.S.	
2	Win	2–0	(United States) Sean Crowdus	TKO	1 (4), 2:22	12 Feb 1994	(United States) Cervantes Center, St. Louis, Missouri, U.S.	
1	Win	1–0	(United States) Hilario Mercedes	PTS	4	8 Jan 1994	(United States) Friar Tuck Inn, Catskill, New York, U.S.	

Awards
Preceded by None	Amsterdam Sportsman of the Year; 1999	Succeeded by Marten Eikelboom
