= Sherry Block =

American archer (born 1971)

Personal information
- Nationality: American
- Born: February 10, 1971 (age 54); Denver, Colorado, United States

Sport
- Sport: Archery

Sherry Block (born February 10, 1971) is an American archer. She competed in the women's individual and team events at the 1992 Summer Olympics.
