= Lotfi Missaoui =

Tunisian boxer (born 1970)

Personal information
- Nationality: Tunisian
- Born: 4 September 1970 (age 54)

Sport
- Sport: Boxing

Lotfi Missaoui (born 4 September 1970) is a Tunisian boxer. He competed in the men's middleweight event at the 1992 Summer Olympics.
