= Middelbeers =

- Village
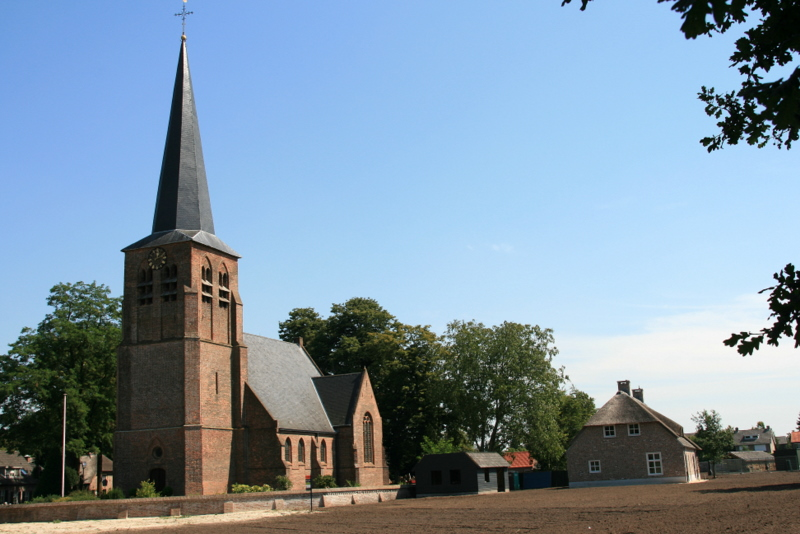
- Old St Willibrordus Church

- Location in the province of North Brabant in the Netherlands Middelbeers (Netherlands)
- Coordinates: 51.4672°N 5.2490°E
- Country: Netherlands
- Province: North Brabant
- Municipality: Oirschot

Area
  - Total: 8.31 km^{2} (3.21 sq mi)
- Elevation: 19 m (62 ft)

Population (2021)
  - Total: 3,400
  - Density: 410/km^{2} (1,100/sq mi)
- Time zone: UTC+1 (CET)
  - Summer (DST): UTC+2 (CEST)
- Postal code: 5091
- Dialing code: 013

Middelbeers is a village in the municipality of Oirschot in the Dutch province of North Brabant. It is located between Oirschot (c. 6 km) and Hilvarenbeek (c. 7 km). It is one of the three Beers villages.

== History ==
The village was first mentioned in 1207 as Berses, and means "hedged area". Middel (middle) has been added to distinguish from Oostelbeers and Westelbeers. Middelbeers is an agricultural village which developed in the Middle Ages around a little square. In 1542, Middelbeers was completely destroyed and burnt by Maarten van Rossum, the field marshal of the Charles II, Duke of Guelders.

The old St Willibrordus Church was built in the 15th century. It was replaced by a new church which became the parish church. The church was restored between 1961 and 1962. The old church is used for weddings, concerts and expositions. The new St Willibrordus Church was built between 1925 and 1927 and contains Art Deco elements.

The estate De Baest is located to the north of the village. It was originally owned by the Tongerlo Abbey, and transferred to the Diocese of 's-Hertogenbosch in 1593. In 1648, it was confiscated by the States General of the Netherlands and became private property around 1670. In 1854, it was extensively modified into its current shape. The garden contains a Venus de Milo statue by Jan Baptist Xavery from 1725.

Middelbeers was home to 375 people in 1840. Middelbeers was the capital of the municipality of Oost-, West- en Middelbeers until 1996 when it became part of the municipality of Oirschot.

== Notable people ==
- Sjan van Dijk (born 1964), archer who competed in the 1992 Summer Olympics

== Gallery ==
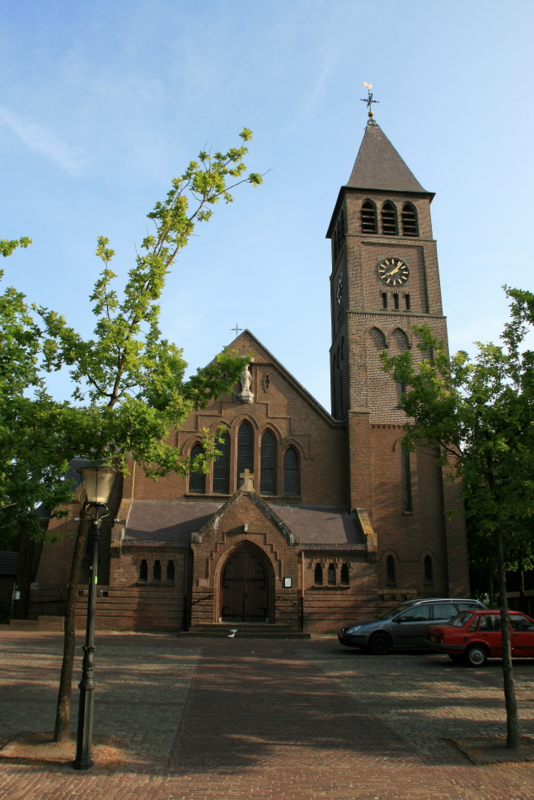
New St Willibrordus Church

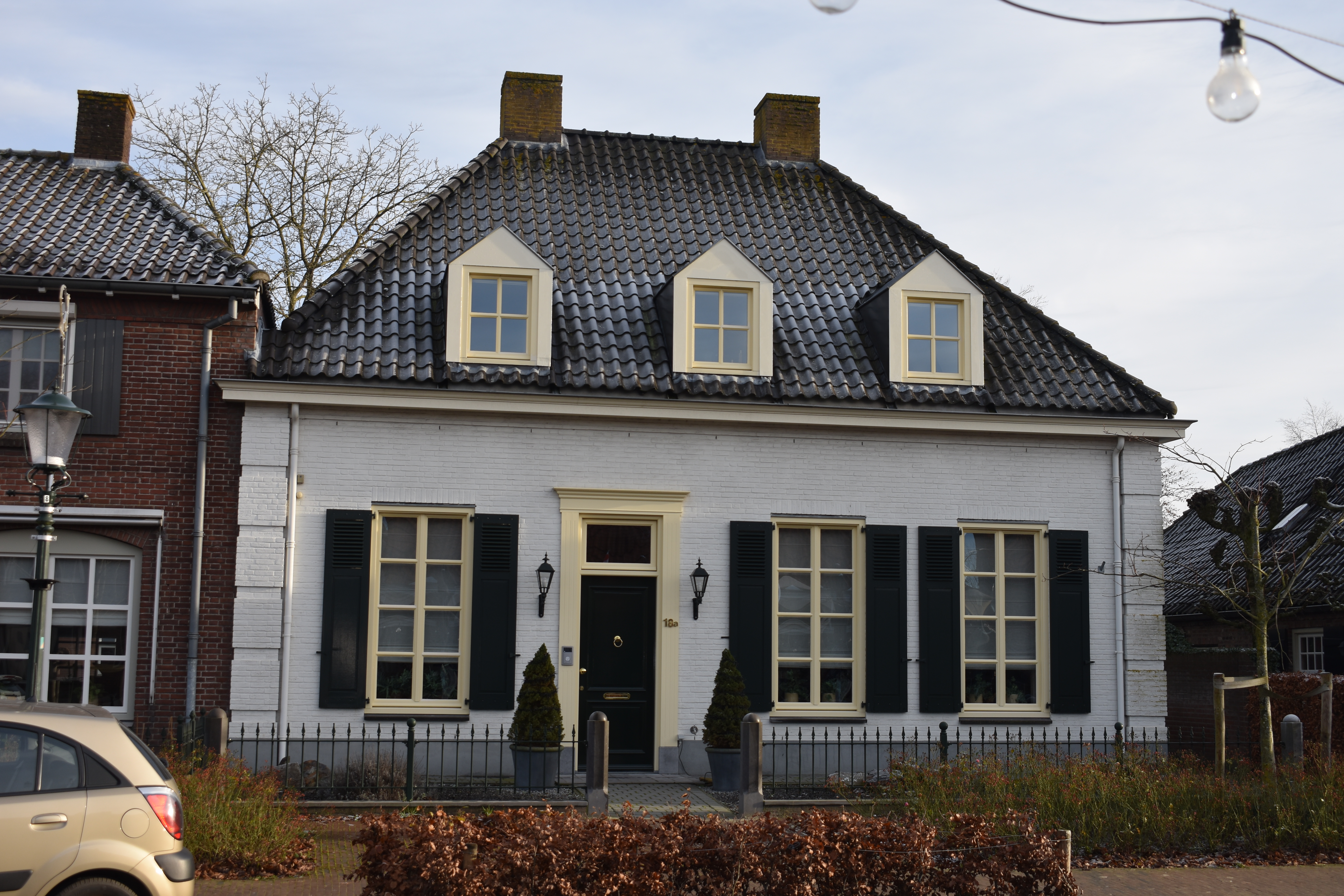
House in Middelbeers

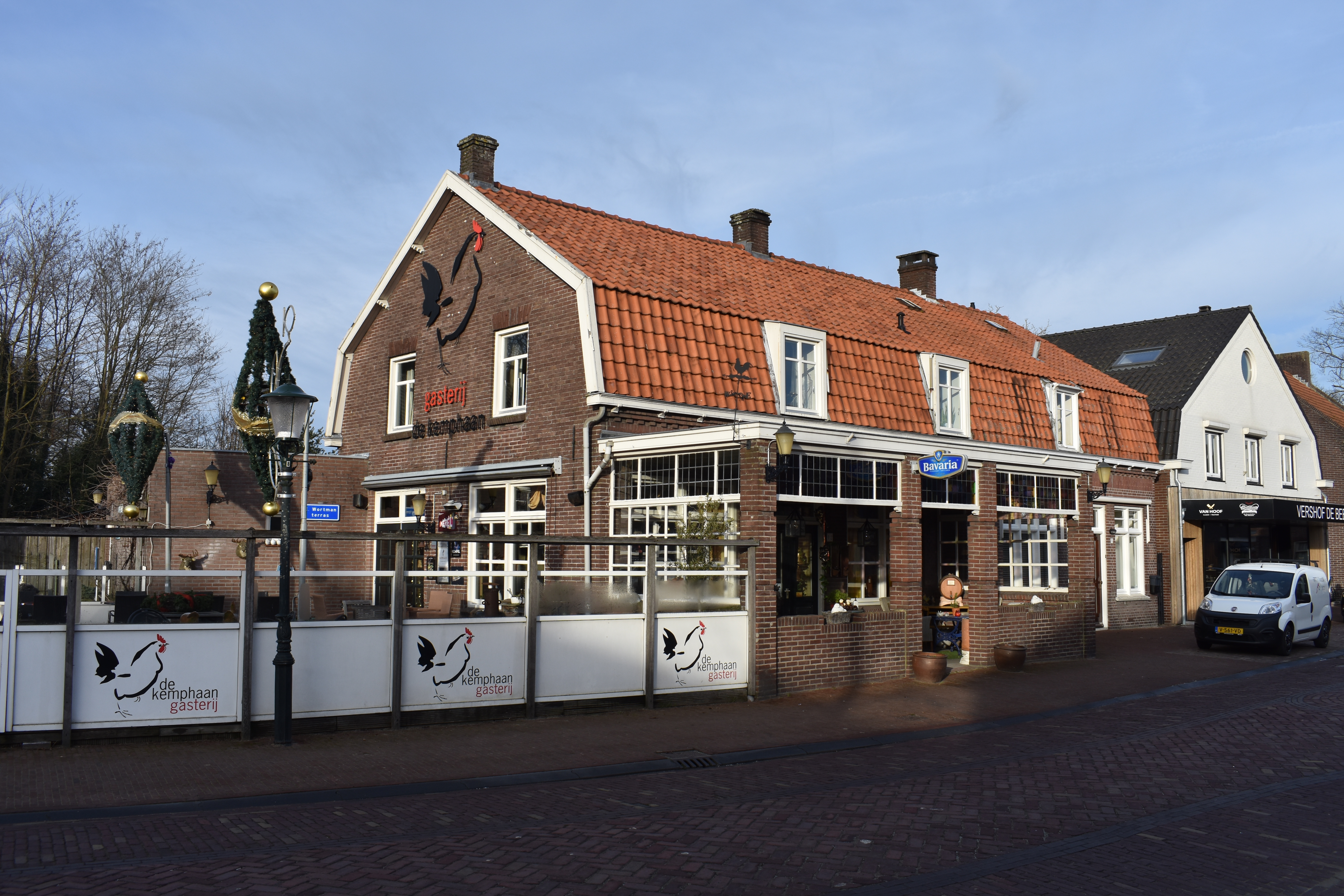
Pub in Middelbeers

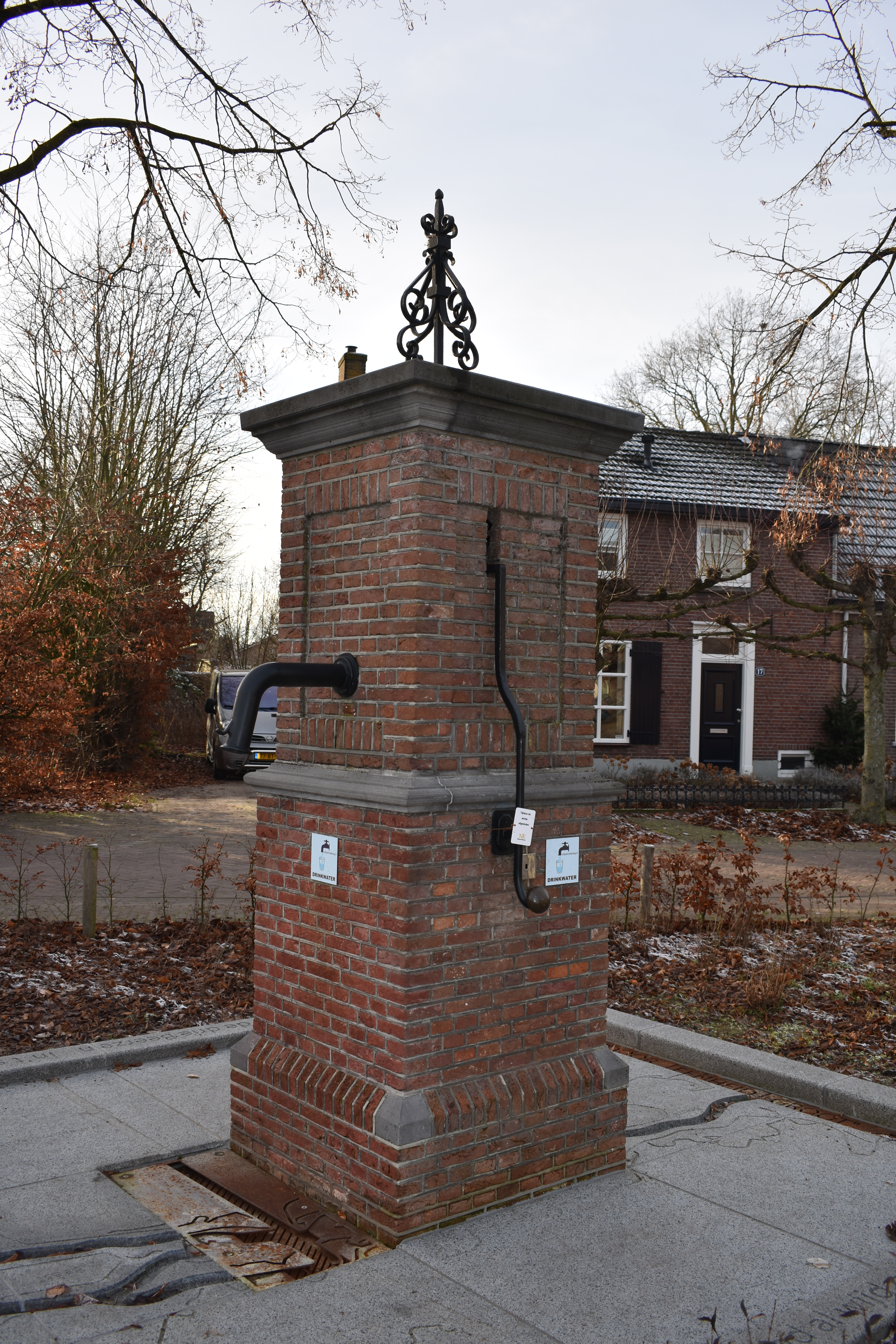
Village pump
