= Lai Fang-mei =

Taiwanese archer

Lai Fang-mei (born 30 December 1960) is an archer who represented Chinese Taipei.

== Archery ==
Lai finished twelfth at the 1988 Summer Olympic Games in the women's individual event. She also finished eleventh in the women's team event as part of the Chinese Taipei team as part of the Chinese Taipei team.

At the 1990 Asian Games she won a silver medal in the women's team event.

In 1992 Lai finished seventh in the women's individual event beating Nathalie Hibon and Joanna Nowicka before losing to Kim Soo-nyung in the quarterfinals. She finished eleventh in the women's team event.
