= Oost-, West- en Middelbeers =

Coordinates: 51.468018°N 5.250607°E

Oost-, West- en Middelbeers was a municipality in the Dutch province of North Brabant. It included the villages Oostelbeers, Middelbeers, and Westelbeers.

The municipality existed until 1997, when it became part of Oirschot.
