= Edyta Korotkin =

Polish archer (born 1972)

Personal information
- Nationality: Polish
- Born: 18 April 1972 (age 54) Kołobrzeg, Poland

Sport
- Sport: Archery

Edyta Korotkin (born 18 April 1972) is a Polish archer. She competed in the women's individual and team events at the 1992 Summer Olympics.
