= Sin Song-hui =

North Korean archer

Personal information
- Nationality: North Korean
- Born: 24 March 1970 (age 56)

Sport
- Sport: Archery

Sin Song-hui (born 24 March 1970) is a North Korean archer. She competed in the women's individual and team events at the 1992 Summer Olympics.
