= Iwona Okrzesik =

Polish archer (born 1972)

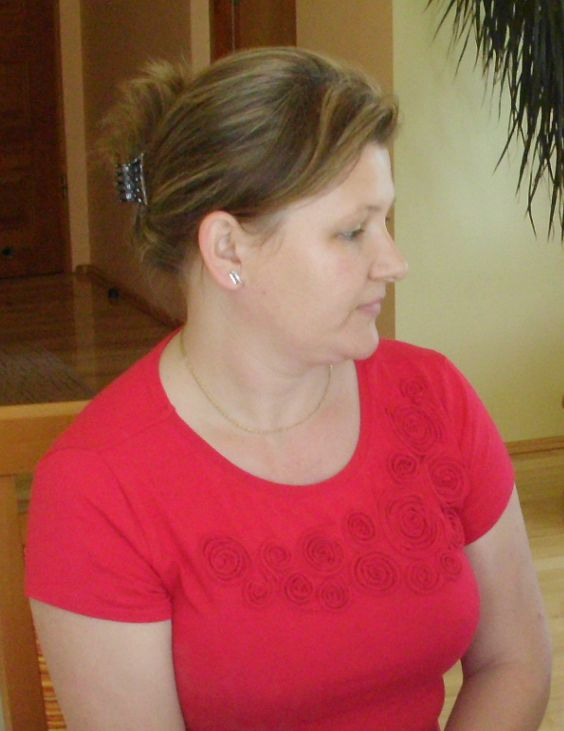
- Iwona Okrzesik-Kotajny in 2012

Personal information
- Full name: Iwona Okrzesik-Kotajny
- Nationality: Polish
- Born: 22 June 1972 (age 54) Żywiec, Poland

Sport
- Sport: Archery

Iwona Okrzesik (born 22 June 1972) is a Polish archer. She competed in the women's individual and team events at the 1992 Summer Olympics.
