= Gilberto Brown =

Virgin Islands boxer (born 1973)

Personal information
- Nationality: American Virgin Islander
- Born: December 2, 1973 (age 51)

Sport
- Sport: Boxing

Gilberto Brown (born December 2, 1973) is a boxer who represents the United States Virgin Islands. He competed in the men's middleweight event at the 1992 Summer Olympics.
