= Maria Testa =

Italian archer (1956–2009)

Personal information
- Nationality: Italian
- Born: 5 February 1956; Rome, Italy
- Died: 13 September 2009 (aged 53)

Sport
- Sport: Archery

Maria Testa (5 February 1956 – 13 September 2009) was an Italian archer. She competed in the women's individual event at the 1992 Summer Olympics.
