= Christine Gabillard =

French archer (born 1970)

Personal information
- Nationality: French
- Born: 2 January 1970 (age 55); Le Perreux-sur-Marne, France

Sport
- Sport: Archery

Christine Gabillard (born 2 January 1970) is a French archer. She competed in the women's individual and team events at the 1992 Summer Olympics.
