= Ryu Ji-hyun =

South Korean baseball player (born 1971)

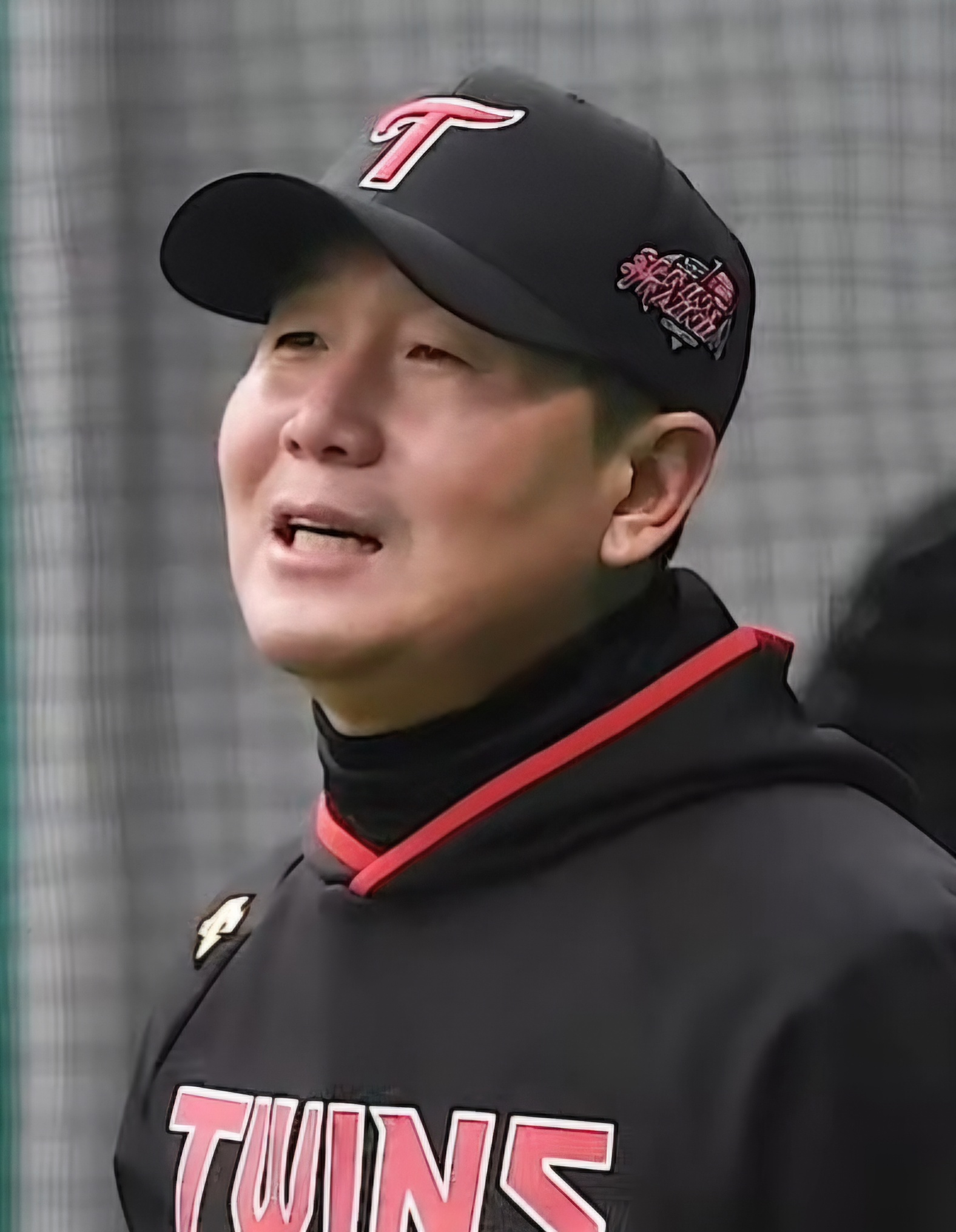

Hanwha Eagles
- Infielder
- Born: 25 May 1971 (age 55); Seoul South Korea
- Bats: Right Throws: Right

KBO debut
- 9 Apil, 1994, for the LG Twins

KBO statistics
- Batting average: .280
- Home runs: 64
- Runs batted in: 379
- Stats at Baseball Reference

Teams
- As player: LG Twins (1994–2004); As coach: LG Twins (2005–2006, 2009–2020); LG Twins 2nd Team (2006); Seattle Mariners (2007–2008); South Korea (2006, 2013–2014, 2017–2018, 2023–2024); As manager: LG Twins (2021–2022); South Korea (2026); Hanwha Eagles (2027–present); As Baseball Commentator: KBS N Sports (2023–2024); As Committee Member in KBO: Talent Donation (2023–2026); Rules (2024); Power Enhancement (2024–2026)

Career highlights and awards
- As player: Korean Series champion (1994); KBO Rookie of the Year (1994); KBO All-Star Game MVP (1997); 2× KBO Golden Glove Award (1998-1999); Mr. All-Stars (1997)
Medals
Representing South Korea
Asian Games
| Silver medal – second place | 1990 Beijing | Team |
Coach for South Korea
Asian Games
| Gold medal – first place | 2022 Hangzhou | Team |
| Gold medal – first place | 2018 Jakarta-Palembang | Team |
| Gold medal – first place | 2014 Incheon | Team |
Manager for South Korea
Asian Games
| Gold medal – first place | 2026 Aichi-Nagoya | Team |

Ryu Ji-hyun (Korean: 류지현, born May 25, 1971) is a South Korean retired professional baseball player and current manager of the KBO League team Hanwha Eagles. He previously managed the LG Twins.

He won the KBO League Rookie of the Year Award in 1994.

== Manager Career ==
He participated in the 2026 World Baseball Classic as the manager of the South Korea national baseball team. and he led the South Korea national team to get the gold medal in the 2026 Asian Games.

On October 13, 2026, he was hired as the new manager of the Hanwha Eagles on a three-year contract.
