= Chris Johnson (boxer) =

Jamaican-born Canadian boxer

Personal information
- Full name: Chris Omar Johnson
- Born: August 8, 1971 (age 55) Manchester, Jamaica

Sport
- Country: Canada
Medal record
Men's boxing
Representing Canada
Olympic Games
Bronze medal – third place	1992 Barcelona	Middleweight
World Amateur Championships
Bronze medal – third place	1991 Sydney	Middleweight
Commonwealth Games
Gold medal – first place	1990 Auckland	Middleweight
Pan American Games
Silver medal – second place	1991 Havana	Middleweight

Chris Omar Johnson (born August 8, 1971) is a Jamaican-born boxer, who won a middleweight bronze medal at the 1992 Summer Olympics for Canada. He won the middleweight gold medal at the 1990 Commonwealth Games. He was inducted into Boxing Canada’s Hall of Fame, Class of 2019.

Johnson was raised in Kitchener, Ontario, Canada with his three brothers, Greg, Wayne, and Kevin, and 2 sisters, Angelina, and Necoal.

Johnson trained IBF Junior Featherweight World Champion, Steve "The Canadian Kid" Molitor, in addition to notable boxers such as Andrew Singh Kooner, and Natalie "Too Bad" Brown. In 2014, the Toronto Star profiled Michael Brandon, one of his boxers.

== Professional boxing record ==
26 Wins (14 knockouts, 12 decisions), 3 Losses (2 knockouts, 1 decision), 1 Draw
Result	Record	Opponent	Type	Round	Date	Location	Notes
Loss	17-1	(United States) Antonio Tarver	KO	10	3 August 2001	(Washington (state)) Yakama Legends Casino, Toppenish, Washington, United States	Johnson knocked out at 1:53 of the tenth round.
Loss	40-6-1	(United States) "Sweet" Reggie Johnson	UD	12	5 January 2001	Grand Casino Biloxi, Biloxi, Mississippi, United States	NABF. 112-116, 112-117, 111-117.
Win	9-11-1	(United States) Franklin Edmondson	UD	8	25 November 2000	Roseland Ballroom, Taunton, Massachusetts, United States	
Win	18-5-2	(United States) Greg Wright	UD	12	14 July 2000	Hampton Beach Casino Ballroom, Hampton Beach, New Hampshire, United States	NABF Light Heavyweight Title. 115-113, 117-113, 117-111.
Win	14-9	(United States) Tyler Hughes	TKO	5	7 March 2000	Casino Windsor, Windsor, Ontario, Canada	Referee stopped the bout at 2:35 of the fifth round.
Win	7-19-2	(United States) Availeo Slate	TKO	2	5 November 1999	Hyatt Regency, Tampa, Florida, United States	Referee stopped the bout at 2:21 of the second round.
Win	9-5-1	(United States) Cecil McKenzie	TKO	3	21 August 1998	The Orleans, Las Vegas, Nevada, United States	WBF World Light Heavyweight Title. Referee stopped the bout at 2:50 of the third round.
Win	14-8-1	(United States) Napoleon Pitt	TKO	1	28 March 1998	Boardwalk Hall, Atlantic City, New Jersey, United States	
Win	17-28-1	(United States) Melvin Wynn	TKO	5	20 November 1997	(Georgia (U.S. state)) Doraville, Georgia, United States	
Draw	24-7-1	(United States) Ernest Mateen	TD	3	3 October 1997	Tropicana Hotel & Casino, Atlantic City, New Jersey, United States	
Win	6-39-1	(United States) James "The Giant Peach" Mullins	TKO	2	9 September 1997	Nashville, Tennessee, United States	
Loss	46-5	(United Kingdom) Herol Graham	TKO	8	12 July 1997	(United Kingdom) Olympia, London, England	WBC International Super Middleweight Title. Referee stopped the bout at 2:40 of the eighth round.
Win	14-2	(Czech Republic) Milan Konecny	PTS	8	28 April 1997	(United Kingdom) Ice arena, Hull, England	79.5-77.
Win	16-31-5	(United Kingdom) Paul Wesley	KO	2	25 March 1997	(United Kingdom) Broadway Theatre, Catford, Lewisham, London, England	Wesley knocked out at 0:50 of the second round.
Win	13-1	(United States) Antwun Echols	MD	10	11 October 1996	International Plaza Hotel, Toronto, Ontario, Canada	
Win	6-5	(United Kingdom) Darren Ashton	TKO	1	9 July 1996	(United Kingdom) York Hall, Bethnal Green, London, England	
Win	19-3-3	(Wales) Darron Griffiths	RTD	3	2 April 1996	(United Kingdom) Elephant & Castle, London, England	Griffiths retired at the end of the third round.
Win	20-3	(United States) Rocky Gannon	UD	8	18 July 1995	IMA Sports Arena, Flint, Michigan, United States	
Win	19-8	(Kenya) Chris Sande	TKO	2	22 April 1995	MGM Grand Garden Arena, Las Vegas, Nevada, United States	
Win	10-2	(Kazakhstan) Asluddin Umarov	UD	4	18 February 1995	MGM Grand Garden Arena, Las Vegas, Nevada, United States	
Win	10-13-2	(United States) Eric French	PTS	8	26 January 1995	Rosemont, Illinois, United States	
Win	4-23	(United States) Tony Golden	PTS	6	20 December 1994	Rosemont, Illinois, United States	
Win	7-1	(United States) Roman Santos	PTS	6	18 November 1994	MGM Grand Garden Arena, Las Vegas, Nevada, United States	
Win	3-2	(Dominican Republic) Apolinar Hernandez	UD	4	13 February 1994	Bally's Park Place, Atlantic City, New Jersey, United States	
Win	5-5-1	(United States) Caseny Truesdale	TKO	3	10 November 1993	Atlantic City, New Jersey, United States	
Win	2-4-3	(United States) Roy Payne	PTS	4	6 October 1993	Harrah's Marina, Atlantic City, New Jersey, United States	
Win	1-2	(United States) Vernon Hicks	TKO	2	22 July 1993	Bay St. Louis, Mississippi, United States	
Win	--	(Guyana) Shaun Holder	TKO	2	13 May 1993	Atlantic City, New Jersey, United States	
Win	0-14	(Mexico) Quirino Garcia	PTS	4	24 April 1993	The Aladdin, Las Vegas, Nevada, United States	
Win	3-0	(United States) Berry Butler	TKO	3	28 February 1993	Trump Castle, Atlantic City, New Jersey, United States	

== 1992 Summer Olympics results ==
- Defeated Mohamed Siluvangi (Zaire) TKO 3
- Defeated Stefan Trendafilov (Bulgaria) TKO 1
- Lost to Chris Byrd (USA) 3-17
