= Chao Lu (boxer) =

Chinese boxer

Personal information
- Nationality: Chinese
- Born: 6 March 1970 (age 55)

Sport
- Sport: Boxing

Chao Lu (born 6 March 1970) is a Chinese boxer. He competed in the men's middleweight event at the 1992 Summer Olympics.
