= Rusena Gelanteh =

Indonesian archer (born 1968)

Personal information
- Nationality: Indonesian
- Born: 6 March 1968 (age 58)

Sport
- Sport: Archery
Medal record
Women's recurve archery
Representing Indonesia
Asian Games
Silver medal – second place	1994 Hiroshima	Women's team
SEA Games
Gold medal – first place	1991 Manila	Women's team
Silver medal – second place	1991 Manila	Individual

Rusena Gelanteh (born 6 March 1968) is an Indonesian archer. She competed in the women's individual and team events at the 1992 Summer Olympics. She won a silver medal at the 1994 Asian Games as part of the Indonesian Archery team
