= Ri Myong-gum =

North Korean archer (born 1968)

Personal information
- Nationality: North Korean
- Born: 6 June 1968 (age 58)

Sport
- Sport: Archery

Ri Myong-gum (born 6 June 1968) is a North Korean archer. She competed in the women's individual and team events at the 1992 Summer Olympics.
