= Tommaso Russo =

Italian boxer

Personal information
- Nationality: Italian
- Born: 31 August 1971 (age 53); Marcianise, Italy

Sport
- Sport: Boxing

Tommaso Russo (born 31 August 1971) is an Italian former boxer. He competed in the men's middleweight event at the 1992 Summer Olympics.
