= Lise-Lotte Djerf =

Swedish archer (born 1963)

Personal information
- Nationality: Swedish
- Born: 17 March 1963 (age 62); Huskvarna, Sweden

Sport
- Sport: Archery

Lise-Lotte Djerf (born 17 March 1963) is a Swedish archer. She competed in the women's individual and team events at the 1992 Summer Olympics.
