= 1993 World Archery Championships =

- Location: Antalya, Turkey
- Start date: 8 September
- End date: 12 September

The 1993 World Archery Championships were the 37th edition of the event. The event was held in Antalya, Turkey, from 8 to 12 September 1993 and was organised by the World Archery Federation (FITA).

The event marked the last time the compound discipline was not contested at the World Championships. The men's recurve competition was won for the first time by a Korean, Park Kyung-mo, initiating a run of nine different Korean winners in ten championships through 2011.

== Medals summary ==
=== Recurve ===
| Event | Gold | Silver | Bronze |
|---|---|---|---|
| Men's individual | Park Kyung-mo; South Korea | Kim Kyung-ho; South Korea | Stanislav Zabrodsky; Ukraine |
| Women's individual | Kim Hyo-jung; South Korea | Cho Youn-jeong; South Korea | Iana Tuniants; Kazakhstan |
| Men's team | France | South Korea | Netherlands |
| Women's team | South Korea | Russia | China |

== Medals table ==
| Rank | Nation | Gold | Silver | Bronze | Total |
|---|---|---|---|---|---|
| 1 | South Korea | 3 | 3 | 0 | 6 |
| 2 | France | 1 | 0 | 0 | 1 |
| 3 | Russia | 0 | 1 | 0 | 1 |
| 4 | China | 0 | 0 | 1 | 1 |
| 4 | Kazakhstan | 0 | 0 | 1 | 1 |
| 4 | Netherlands | 0 | 0 | 1 | 1 |
| 4 | Ukraine | 0 | 0 | 1 | 1 |
| Totals (7 entries) | | 4 | 4 | 4 | 12 |
