= Marion Wagner (archer) =

German archer (born 1968)

Personal information
- Nationality: German
- Born: 9 June 1968 (age 56); Eslohe, West Germany

Sport
- Sport: Archery

Marion Wagner (born 9 June 1968) is a German archer. She competed in the women's individual and team events at the 1992 Summer Olympics.
