= Brian Lentz =

Danish boxer

Personal information
- Full name: Brian Pavia Lentz
- Nationality: Danish
- Born: 29 February 1968 (age 57) Glostrup, Denmark

Sport
- Sport: Boxing

Brian Pavia Lentz (born 29 February 1968) is a Danish boxer. He competed in the men's middleweight event at the 1992 Summer Olympics.

== See also ==
- Bech, Rasmus (10 August 2016). "Da Fede-Brian blev en stjerne". Politiken (in Danish).
- Bresemann, Peter (15 December 2012). "Læger afviste bokser med sprængt mave". Ekstra Bladet (in Danish).
