= Sylvia Harris (archer) =

British archer (born 1965)

Personal information
- Nationality: British
- Born: 17 March 1965 (age 60); Chorley, England

Sport
- Sport: Archery

Sylvia Harris (born 17 March 1965) is a British archer. She competed in the women's individual and team events at the 1992 Summer Olympics.
