= Bandiin Altangerel =

Mongolian boxer (born 1964)

Personal information
- Native name: Бандийн Алтангэрэл
- Nationality: Mongolian
- Born: 28 August 1964 (age 62)
- Height: 183 cm (6 ft 0 in)
- Weight: 75 kg (165 lb)

Boxing career
- Weight class: Middleweight

Bandiin Altangerel (Mongolian: Бандийн Алтангэрэл; born 28 August 1964) is a Mongolian boxer. He competed in the men's middleweight event at the 1992 Summer Olympics.
