= Astrid Hänschen =

German archer (born 1967)

Personal information
- Nationality: German
- Born: 4 January 1967 (age 58); Hamburg, West Germany

Sport
- Sport: Archery

Astrid Hänschen (born 4 January 1967) is a German archer. She competed in the women's individual and team events at the 1992 Summer Olympics.
