= Reiko Fujita =

Japanese archer (born 1972)

Personal information
- Nationality: Japanese
- Born: 2 July 1972 (age 54)

Sport
- Sport: Archery

Reiko Fujita (藤田玲子, Fujita Reiko; born 2 July 1972) is a Japanese archer. She competed in the women's individual and team events at the 1992 Summer Olympics.
