= Kim Hyo-jung =

South Korean archer

Medal record

Women's archery

Representing South Korea

World Championships
Gold medal – first place	1993 Antalya	Individual
Gold medal – first place	1993 Antalya	Team

Kim Hyo-jung (Korean: 김효정) is a South Korean archer who won the 1993 World Championships in Antalya.
