= Teresa Fernández =

Spanish archer (born 1949)

Personal information
- Nationality: Spanish
- Born: 15 October 1949 (age 75); Oviedo, Spain

Sport
- Sport: Archery

Teresa Fernández (born 15 October 1949) is a Spanish archer. She competed in the women's individual event at the 1992 Summer Olympics.
