= Sjan van Dijk =

Dutch archer (born 1964)

Personal information
- Nationality: Dutch
- Born: 4 February 1964 (age 61); Middelbeers, Netherlands

Sport
- Sport: Archery

Sjan van Dijk (born 4 February 1964) is a Dutch archer. She competed in the women's individual and team events at the 1992 Summer Olympics.
