= Yukiko Ikeda =

Japanese archer (born 1971)

Personal information
- Nationality: Japanese
- Born: 15 July 1971 (age 55)

Sport
- Sport: Archery

Yukiko Ikeda (池田裕紀子, Ikeda Yukiko; born 15 July 1971) is a Japanese archer. She competed in the women's individual and team events at the 1992 Summer Olympics.
