= Anita Smits =

Dutch archer (born 1967)

Adriana Gerarda Antonia Maria (Anita) Smits (born 22 May 1967 in Oirschot) is a former archer from the Netherlands, who competed for her native country at the 1988 Summer Olympics in Seoul. There she finished in 43rd position, with 1203 points.
