= Jennifer O'Donnell =

American archer (born 1973)

Personal information
- Full name: Jennifer Lynn O'Donnell
- Born: October 12, 1973 (age 52) Farmington, Michigan, United States

Sport
- Sport: Archery
Medal record
Representing United States
Pan American Games
| Gold medal – first place | 1991 Havana | Recurve team |
| Silver medal – second place | 1991 Havana | Recurve individual |
| Silver medal – second place | 1991 Havana | Recurve 60m |
World Championships
| Bronze medal – third place | 1991 Krakow | Recurve team |
World Indoor Championships
| Gold medal – first place | 1993 Perpignan | Recurve individual |

Jennifer Lynn O'Donnell (born October 12, 1973) is an American archer. She competed in the women's individual and team events at the 1992 Summer Olympics.
