= Makoye Isangula =

Tanzanian boxer

Personal information
- Born: 13 August 1964 (age 60); Tanzania
- Height: 175 cm (5 ft 9 in)
- Weight: 75 kg (165 lb)

Sport
- Country: Tanzania
- Sport: Boxing

Makoye Isangula is a Tanzanian Olympic boxer. He represented his country in the middleweight division at the 1992 Summer Olympics. He won his first bout against Siamak Varzideh, and then lost his second bout to Albert Papilaya.
