= Oirschot =

- Municipality
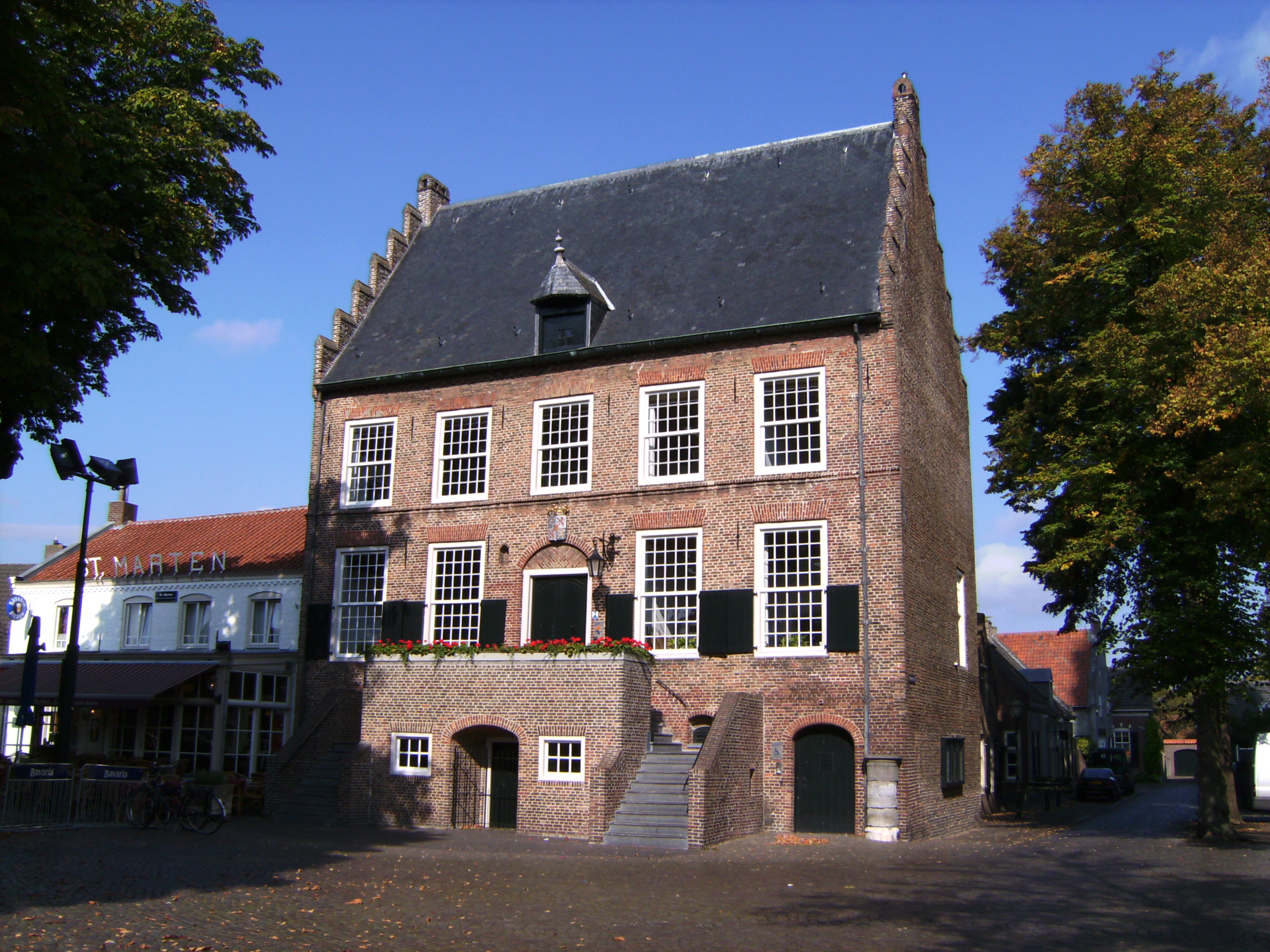
- Former city hall of Oirschot

- Flag Coat of arms

- Location in North Brabant
- Coordinates: 51°30′N 5°18′E
- Country: Netherlands
- Province: North Brabant

Government
  - Body: Municipal council
  - Mayor: Judith Keijzers-Verschelling (CDA)

Area
  - Total: 102.84 km^{2} (39.71 sq mi)
  - Land: 101.78 km^{2} (39.30 sq mi)
  - Water: 1.06 km^{2} (0.41 sq mi)
- Elevation: 17 m (56 ft)

Population (January 2021)
  - Total: 18,842
  - Density: 185/km^{2} (480/sq mi)
- Demonym: Oirschottenaar
- Time zone: UTC+1 (CET)
  - Summer (DST): UTC+2 (CEST)
- Postcode: 5090–5091, 5688–5689
- Area code: 013, 0499
- Website: www.oirschot.nl

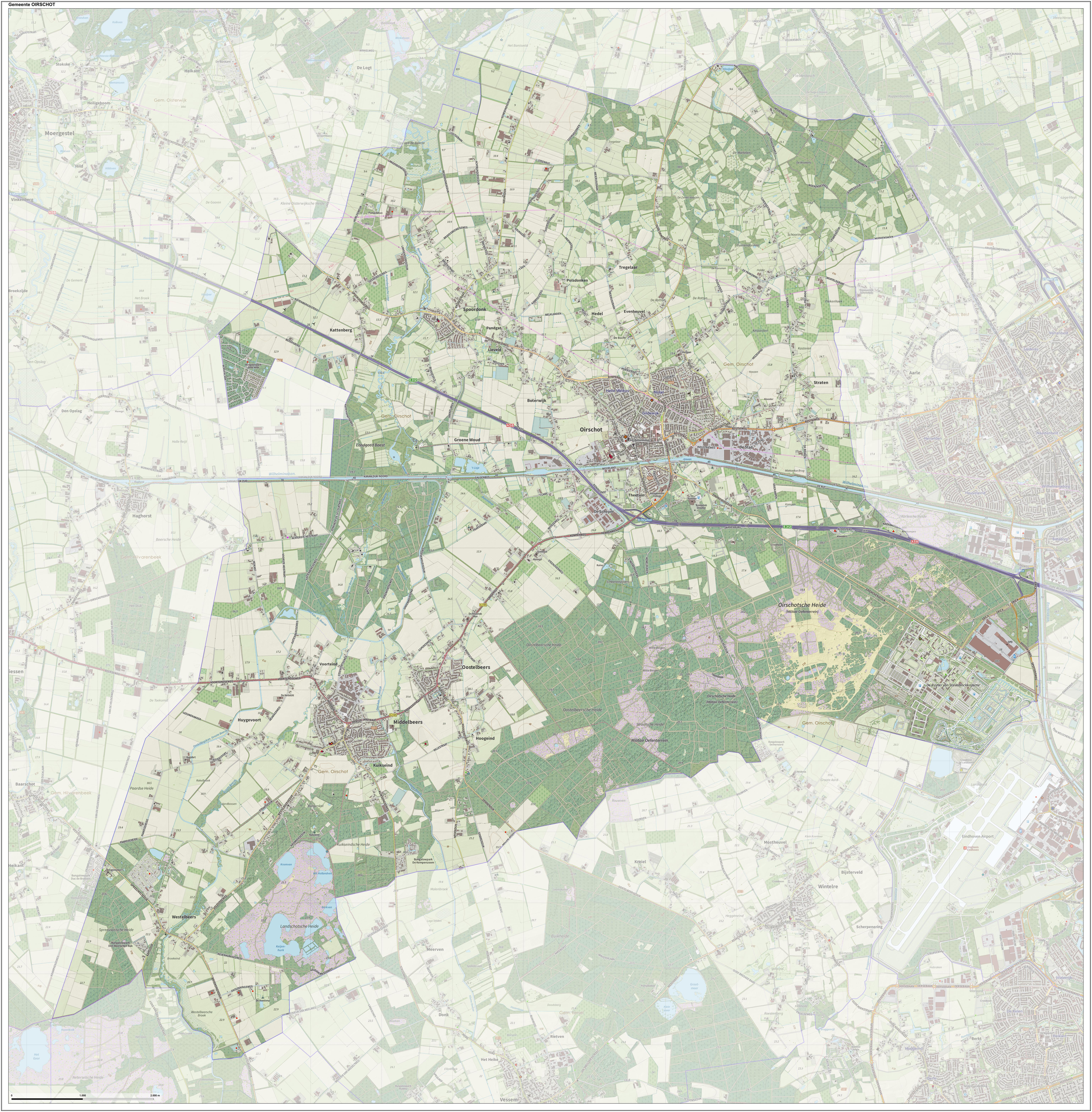
Map of the municipality of Oirschot, June 2015

Oirschot (Dutch pronunciation: [ˈoːrsxɔt]; Orskot in the local dialect) is a municipality and town in the province of North Brabant (Noord-Brabant) in the southern Netherlands. It is 12 kilometres (7.5 mi) from Eindhoven and 20 kilometres (12 mi) from Tilburg. The municipality had a population of 18,842 in 2021.

== Population centres ==
- Oirschot
- Middelbeers
- Oostelbeers
- Spoordonk
- Westelbeers

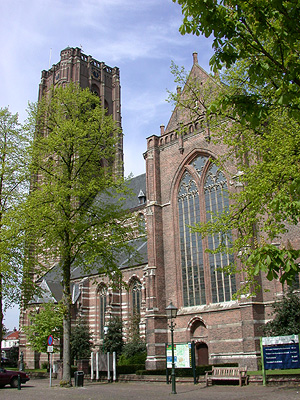
Saint Petrus church

== Sights ==
There are more than 300 monuments in the municipality Oirschot.

Some of the historic buildings in the town of Oirschot are:

- The Roman Catholic Church named Sint-Petrus’-Bandenkerk. This 15th and 16th century Gothic church is the biggest building in the town, and has a 73 meter tower
- The old town hall built in 1513 in the town centre
- Maria-church (Maria-kerk). A 12th-century Romanesque church in the town centre
- Monastery Nazareth (Klooster Nazareth) with a chapel in Neo-Romanesque style (1910)
- Former Brewery De Kroon (Brouwerij de Kroon) built in 1773
- Hof van Solms, palace of Arnoldus Feij (or Arnold Fey)
- The Big Chair (De Grote Stoel) the biggest chair of Europe
- Huize Groenenberg, a house built in 1613

Monuments outside the town include:

- Chapel of the Holy Oak (Kapel van de Heilige Eik), stone chapel dated 1854 built on the foundations of a stone chapel of 1606 (there was another stone chapel and a wooden chapel on the same location before the one of 1606). The chapel of 1606 was demolished by order of the States General in 1649 (Catholicism could not be practiced openly)
- The Old Tower (Oude Toren) of Oostelbeers, a church tower of the 14th century in a patch of forest surrounded by fields
- The Old Church of Middelbeers (Het Oude Kerkje – Oude Sint-Willibrorduskerk) – intact gothic rural church (15th century) typical for the region
- Maria Chapel (Mariakapel) of Westelbeers – chapel dating to 1637; it is unknown why this chapel was not demolished during the 1640s or 1650s like most other Catholic chapels in the region

== Events ==
Among the festivals held in Oirschot every year are:

- Zinderend Oirschot
- Countery & Western weekend

== Politics ==
=== City council ===
The municipal elections in March 2026 resulted in the following make-up of the City Council (17 seats in total):

- De Gewone Man (local party): 5 seats
- CDA: 4 seats
- Dorpsvisie (local party): 3 seats
- Sociaal Progressief Oirschot (local party): 3 seats
- VVD: 2 seats

=== Mayor ===
The mayor of the municipality is Judith Keijzers-Verschelling, a member of the CDA political party.

== Notable people ==
- Arnold Fey, (Dutch Wiki) (born 1633 in Oirschot – 1679) a doctor
- Frans van Lith (born 1863 in Oirschot – 1926) a Jesuit priest in Central Java
- Cornelius Van de Ven (1865 in Oirschot – 1932) Bishop of the Roman Catholic Diocese of Alexandria in Louisiana
- Carl Romme (1896 in Oirschot – 1980) a politician
- Michiel van Kempen (born 1957 in Oirschot) a writer, art historian and literary critic
- Anita Smits (born 1967 in Oirschot) a former archer who competed at the 1988 Summer Olympics
- Truus Smulders-Beliën (1902–1966), first female mayor in the Netherlands
- Sophie van Gestel (born 1991 in Oostelbeers) a Dutch beach volleyball player, participated in the 2012 Summer Olympics

== Gallery ==
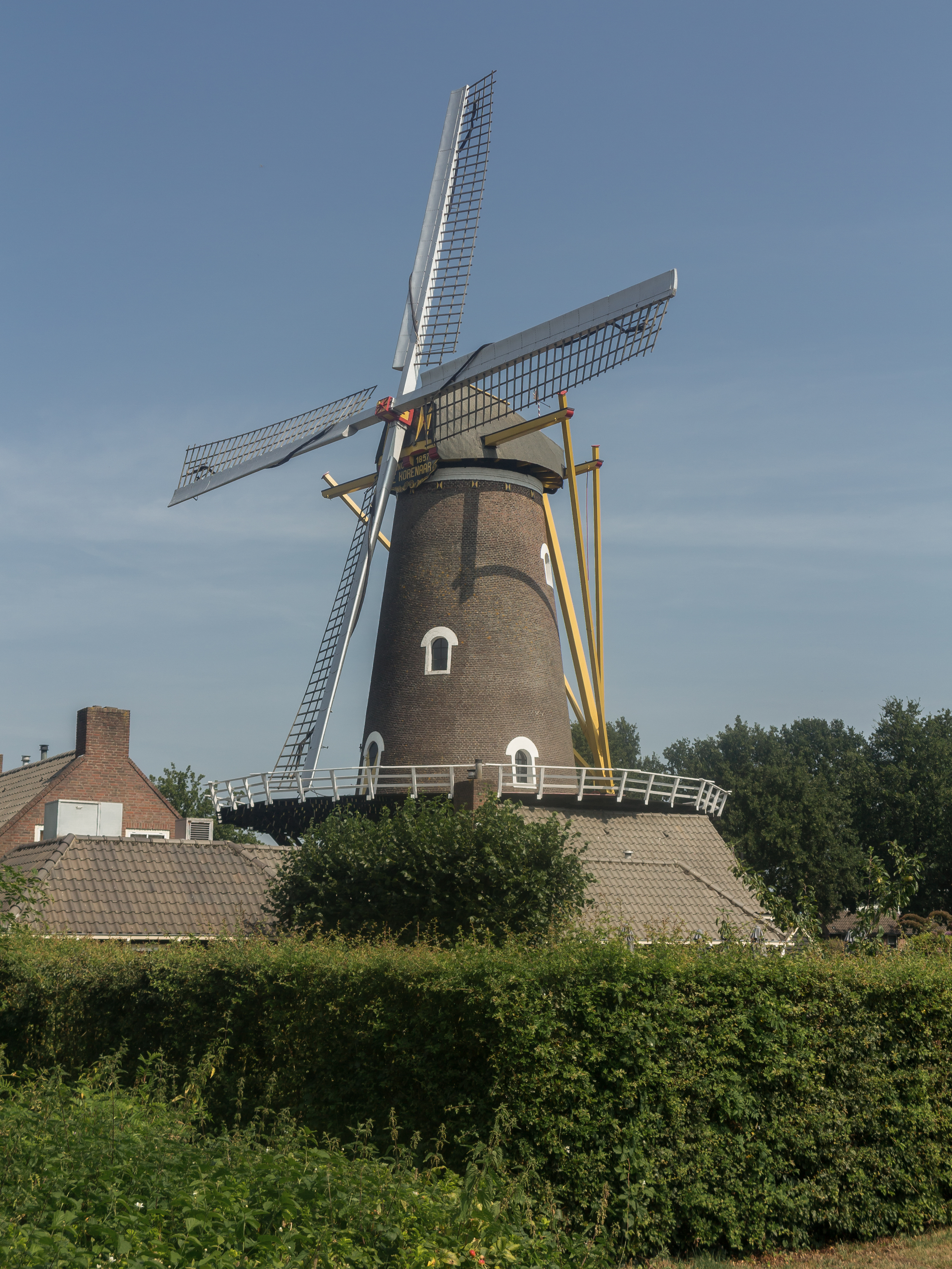
Oirschot, windmill: windmolen de Korenaar

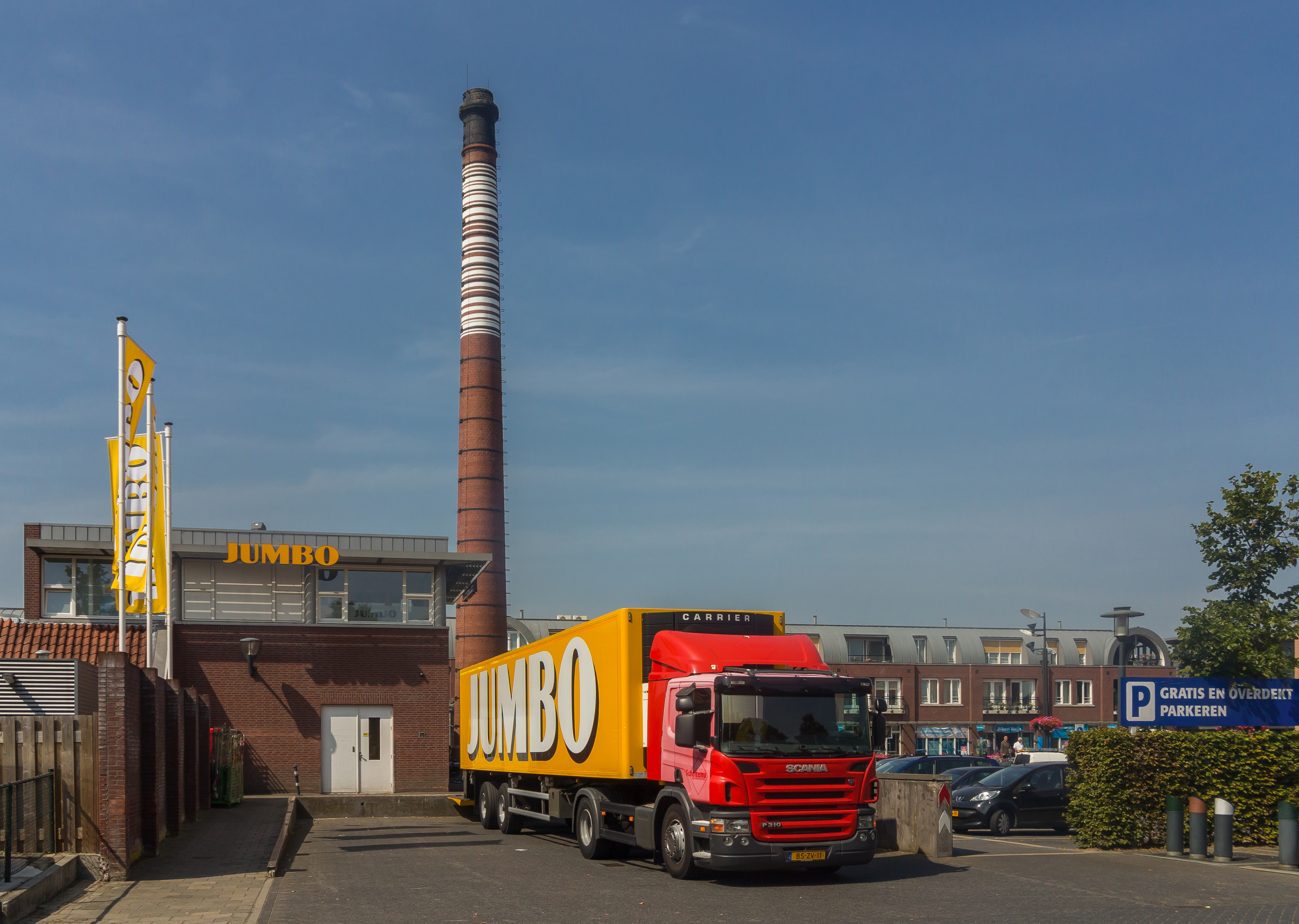
Oirschot, Jumbo supermarket

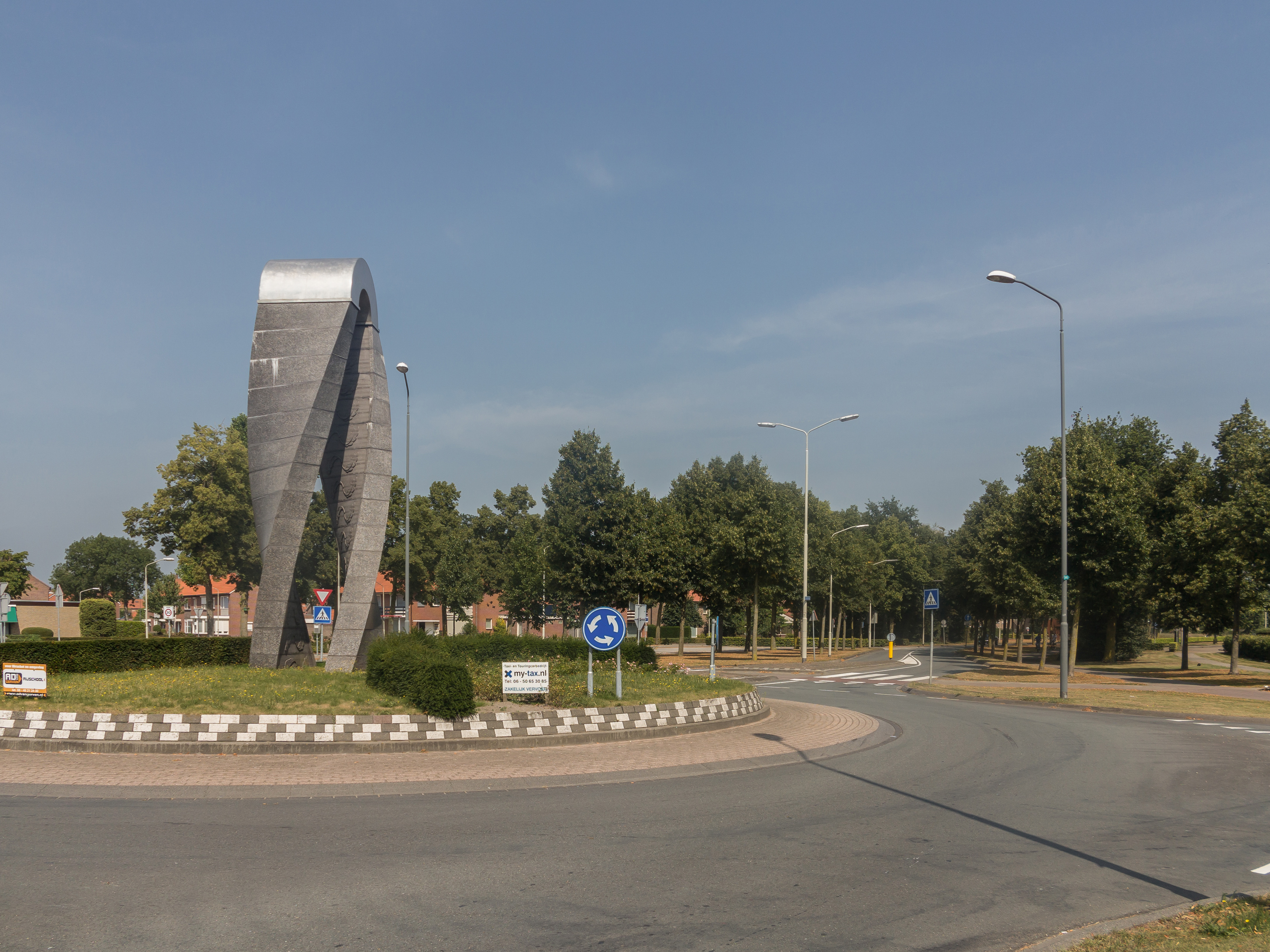
Oirschot, sculpture near de Sint Jorisstraat

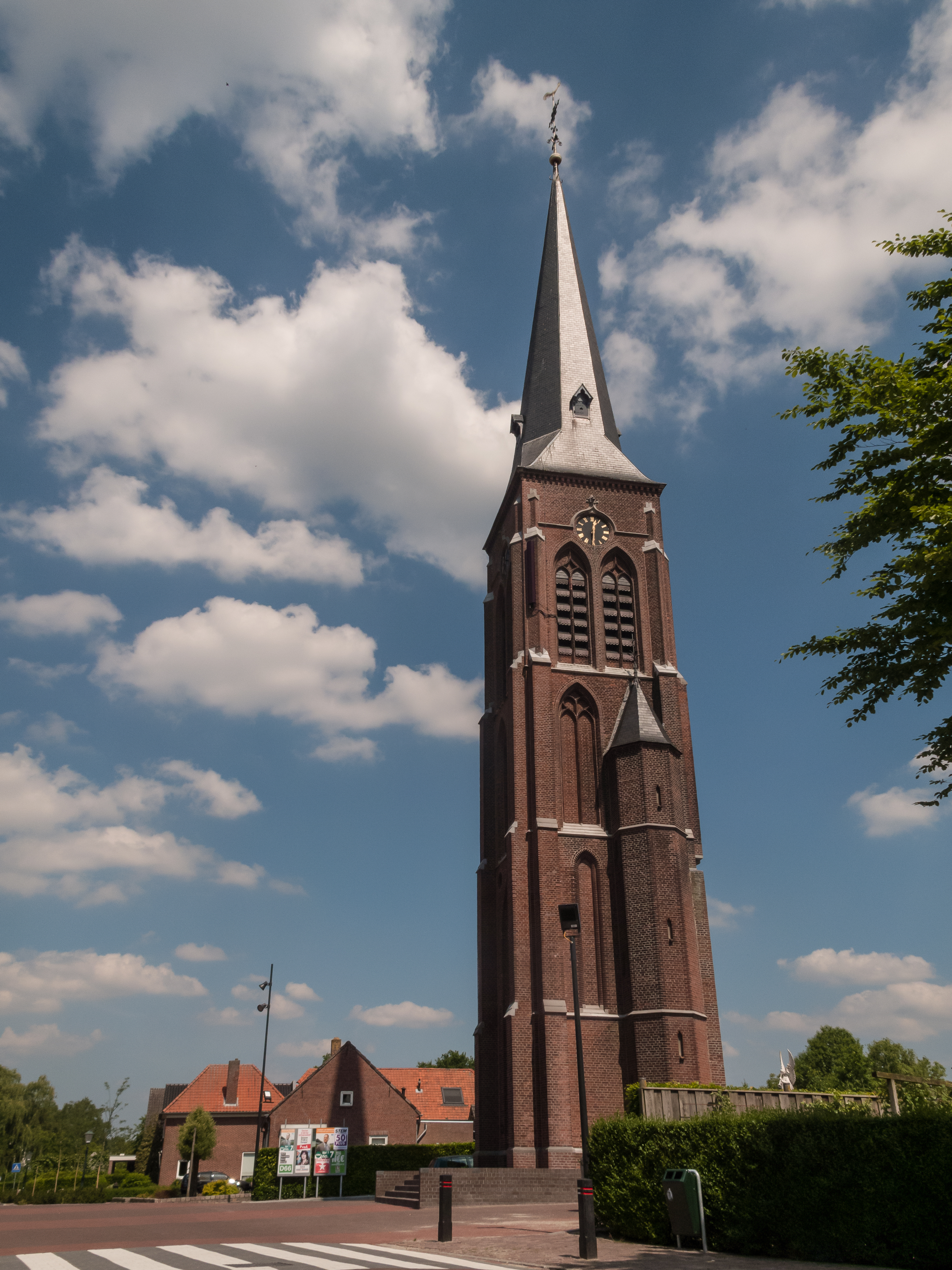
Oostelbeers, tower: de Heilige Andreas en Antonius van Paduatoren

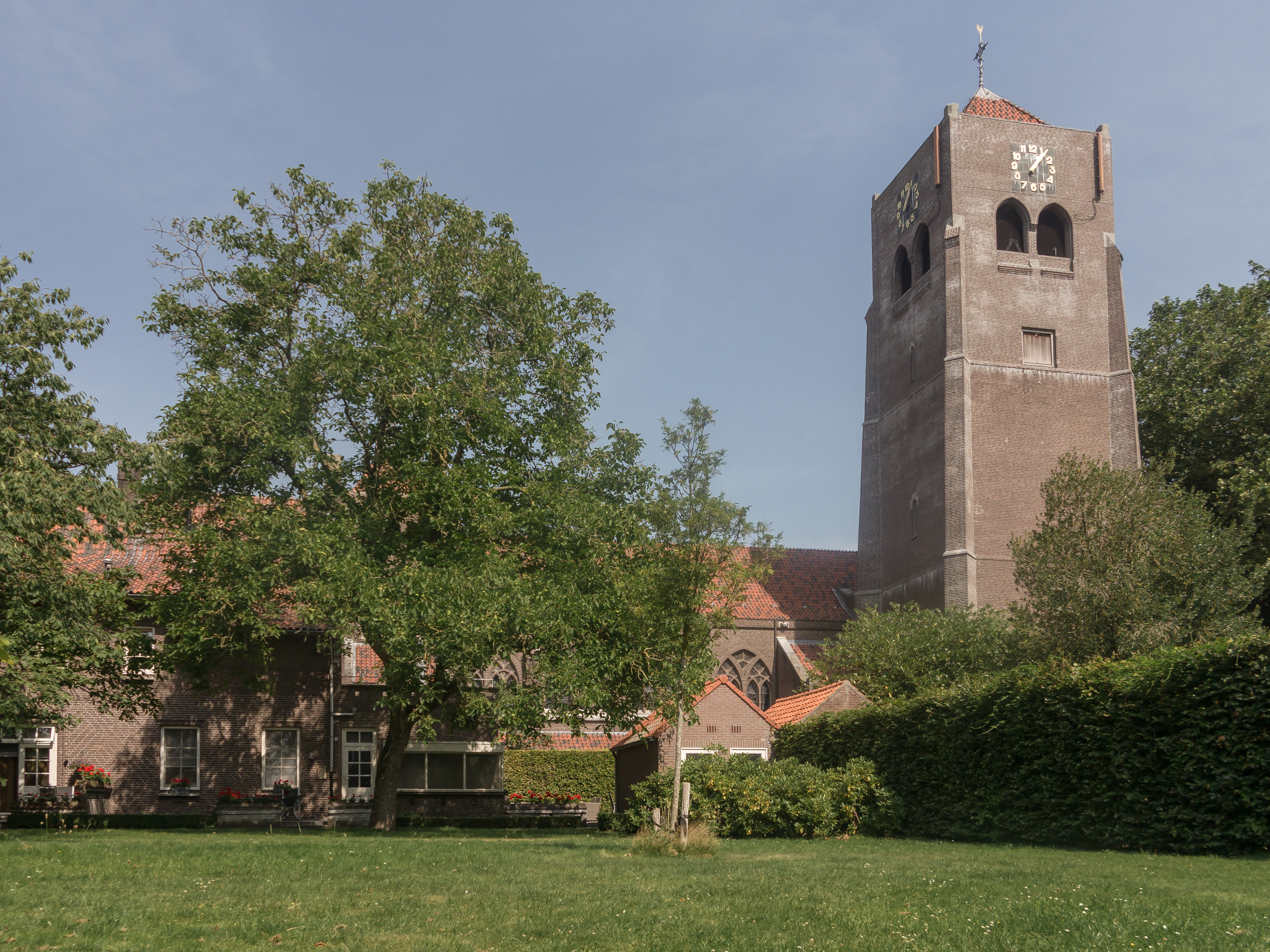
Spoordonk, church: de Bernadettekerk
