= Faye Johnstone =

New Zealand archer (born 1961)

Faye Barbara L. Johnstone (born 6 November 1961) is a former archer from New Zealand. She represented New Zealand at the 1992 Summer Olympics in Barcelona, Spain.

Johnstone was born in Auckland, New Zealand, in 1961. She competed in the World Archery Championships four times, in 1989, 1991, 1993 and 1995.
