= Marina Szendey =

Hungarian archer (born 1971)

Personal information
- Nationality: Hungarian
- Born: 8 July 1971 (age 55) Budapest, Hungary

Sport
- Sport: Archery

Marina Szendey (born 8 July 1971) is a Hungarian archer. She competed in the women's individual and team events at the 1992 Summer Olympics.
