= Purnama Pandiangan =

Indonesian archer (born 1968)

Personal information
- Nationality: Indonesian
- Born: 12 October 1968 (age 57)

Sport
- Sport: Archery
Medal record
Women's recurve archery
Representing Indonesia
Asian Games
Silver medal – second place	1994 Hiroshima	Women's team
SEA Games
Gold medal – first place	1991 Manila	Individual
Gold medal – first place	1991 Manila	Women's team

Purnama Pandiangan (born 12 October 1968) is an Indonesian former archer. She competed in the women's individual and team events at the 1992 Summer Olympics.
