= Luis Méndez (boxer) =

Uruguayan boxer (born 1969)

Personal information
- Nationality: Uruguayan
- Born: 1 December 1969 (age 56)

Sport
- Sport: Boxing

Luis Méndez (born 1 December 1969) is a Uruguayan boxer. He competed in the men's middleweight event at the 1992 Summer Olympics.
