= Johanna Schenk =

South African archer (born 1944)

Johanna Rieta Schenk
Personal information
- Born: 31 July 1944 (age 80); Keimos, Northern Cape, South Africa

Sport
- Sport: Archery

Johanna Margarietha "Rieta" Schenk (born 31 July 1944) is a former South African archer. She represented South Africa at the 1992 Summer Olympics, which was also the first instance where South Africa were able to compete in the Olympic event since 1960 after the nation affected due to apartheid.

Schenk was the part of the South African archery team which also coincidentally made its debut in the 1992 Summer Olympics.
