= Stefan Trendafilov =

Bulgarian boxer

Stefan Georgiev Trendafilov (Bulgarian: Стефан Георгиев Трендафилов; born March 4, 1971, in Sliven) is a retired boxer from Bulgaria, who competed for his native country at the 1992 Summer Olympics in Barcelona. There he was defeated in the quarterfinals of the Men's Middleweight (– 75 kg) by Canada's eventual bronze medalist Chris Johnson.
