= Patricia Obregón (archer) =

Costa Rican archer (1952–2020)

Personal information
- Born: 18 February 1952; San José, Costa Rica
- Died: 6 October 2020 (aged 68)

Sport
- Sport: Archery

Patricia Obregón (18 February 1952 – 6 October 2020) was a Costa Rican archer. She competed in the women's individual event at the 1992 Summer Olympics.
