= Weng Yu-yi =

Taiwanese cyclist

Personal information
- Full name: Chinese: 翁 有義; pinyin: Wēng Yǒu-yì
- Born: 29 March 1973 (age 53)

Cycling career
- Sport: Cycling

Weng Yu-yi (born 29 March 1973) is a Taiwanese former cyclist. He competed in the three events at the 1992 Summer Olympics.
