= Archery at the 1991 SEA Games =

== Medalists ==
=== Recurve ===
Event	Gold	Silver	Bronze
Men's individual	(Indonesia) Syafruddin Mawi (2501)	(Indonesia) Hendra Setijawan Amin (2498)	(Philippines) Michael Focundo (2422)
Men's team	Indonesia (7469)	Philippines (7233)	Malaysia (7034)
Women's individual	(Indonesia) Purnama Pandiangan (2590)	(Indonesia) Rusena Gelanteh (2574)	(Philippines) Jennifer Chan (2534)
Women's team	Indonesia (7730)	Philippines (7359)	Thailand (7041)

== Medal table ==
* Host nation (Philippines)

Rank	Nation	Gold	Silver	Bronze	Total
1	Indonesia	4	2	0	6
2	Philippines*	0	2	2	4
3	Malaysia	0	0	1	1
3	Thailand	0	0	1	1
Totals (4 entries)		4	4	4	12
