= Siamak Varzideh =

Iranian boxer

Personal information
- Nationality: Iranian
- Born: 8 August 1970 (age 55)

Sport
- Sport: Boxing
Medal record
Asian Games
Bronze medal – third place	1990 Beijing	75 kg

Siamak Varzideh (Persian: سیامک ورزیده; born 8 August 1970) is an Iranian boxer. He competed in the men's middleweight event at the 1992 Summer Olympics.
