= Liao Ming-hsiung =

Taiwanese baseball player

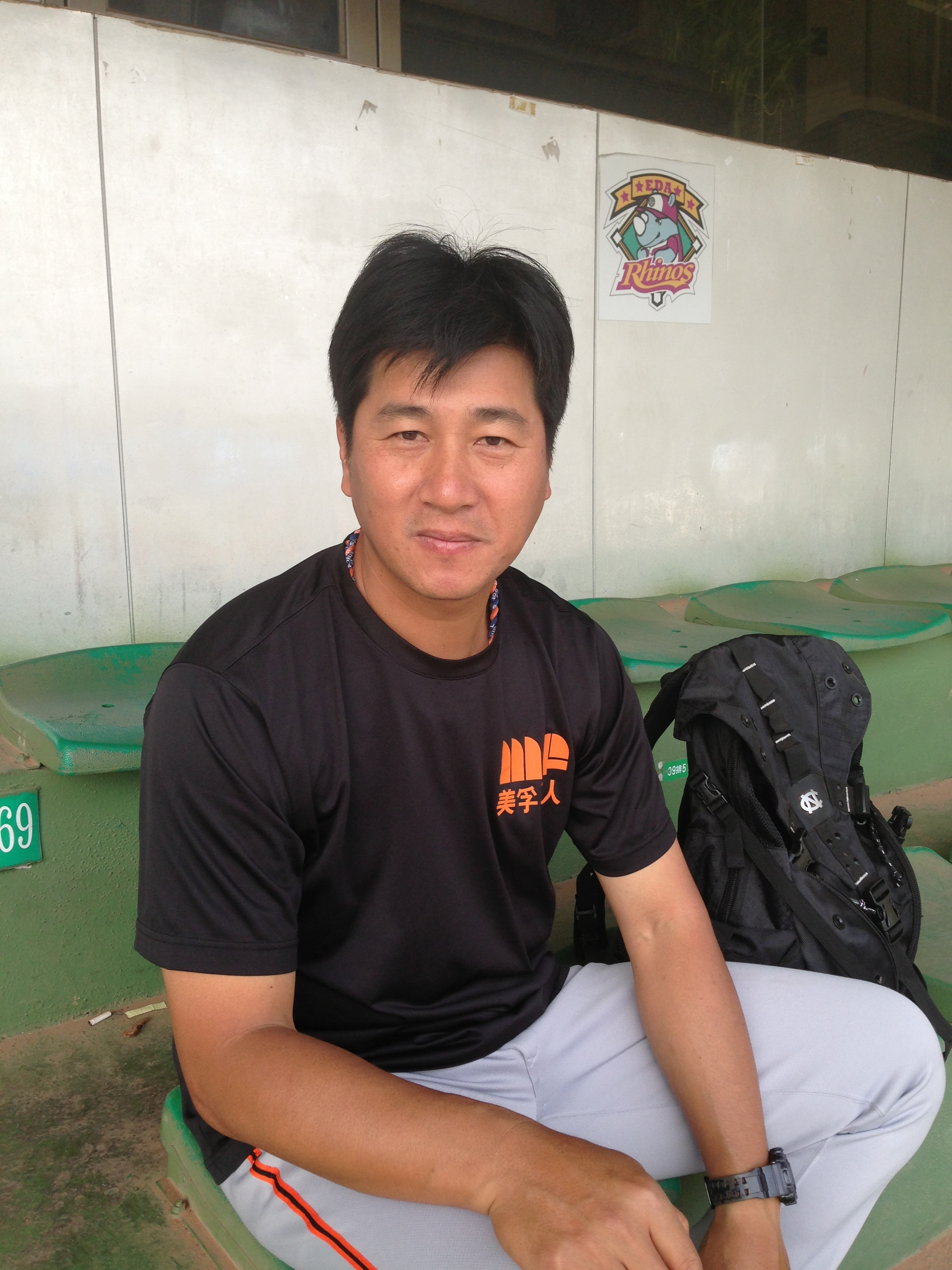
- Outfielder
- Born: 18 October 1968 (age 57); Hengchun, Pingtung County, Taiwan
- Batted: Right Threw: Right

CPBL debut
- March 12, 1993, for the China Times Eagles

Last appearance
- June 15, 1997, for the China Times Eagles

CPBL statistics
- Batting average: .283
- Home runs: 84
- Runs batted in: 279
- Stats at Baseball Reference

Teams
- As player: China Times Eagles (1993–1997); As coach: Shanghai Golden Eagles (2004)

Career highlights and awards
- 4× CPBL All-Star (1993–1996); CPBL RBI leader (1993); 2× CPBL Gold Gloves (1993–1994); 2× CPBL Best Nine (1993–1994); CPBL home run leader (1994)
Medals
Representing Chinese Taipei
Men's baseball
Olympic Games
Silver medal – second place	1992 Barcelona	Team
Asian Championship
Gold medal – first place	1989 South Korea	Team
World Junior Baseball Championship
Silver medal – second place	1986 Windsor	Team

Liao Ming-hsiung (Chinese: 廖敏雄; pinyin: Liào Mǐnxióng; born 18 October 1968 in Hengchun Township, Pingtung County, Taiwan), nicknamed "Prince of Baseball", is a retired Taiwanese professional baseball player (position:outfielder).

== Career ==
A well-known slugger since college era in the Chinese Culture University, Liao is best known for hitting the game-winning RBI twice in the two Chinese Taipei versus Japan matches in the 1992 Summer Olympics's preliminary round and semifinal, where Chinese Taipei finally won the silver medal.

After the 1992 Olympics Liao joined Chinese Professional Baseball League along with the just-established China Times Eagles. He had been gaining popularity for his excellent batting performance (Liao hit 84 home runs in only 416 games, at a speed which was only controversially surpassed by Chia-Hsian Hsieh in the Professional baseball in Taiwan history). However, in June 1997 he was expelled by the Chinese Professional Baseball League after he was confirmed to be involved in The Black Eagles Incident. Liao's fame immediately vanished and he was rumored only could work as a street vendor around 1999-2000. Liao later sought to join Taiwan Major League in 2001 but was refused.

In 2004 Liao started to coach in the China Baseball League under 1992 Summer Olympics fellow Chiang Tai-Chuan. He returned to Taiwan one season later to coach Taiwanese high school baseball teams, and runs a small business.

Before the Chinese Professional Baseball League's 2007 season started, the Uni-President Lions invited Liao to lecture, warning its current players the seriousness of cheating in the game.

== Statistics ==
In the 1992 Olympics:

Hitting average	Games	At bat	Runs	Hits	RBI	Doubles	Triples	HR	K	BB
0.375	9	32	6	12	7	2	0	3	7	3

CPBL career:

Year	Club	Games	At Bat	RBI	Runs	Hits	Doubles	Triples	HR	BB	K	Stolen Bases	Hitting average
1993	China Times Eagles	90	344	60	48	100	19	2	18	39	80	5	0.291
1994	China Times Eagles	90	387	70	65	104	16	2	24	33	84	15	0.297
1995	China Times Eagles	98	403	66	58	100	18	1	22	49	65	4	0.289
1996	China Times Eagles	91	314	43	47	62	13	2	12	33	74	8	0.225
1997	China Times Eagles	47	196	40	36	55	11	0	8	22	29	4	0.32
Total		416	1487	279	254	421	77	7	84	176	332	36	0.283
