= Robert Buda =

Polish boxer

Personal information
- Nationality: Polish
- Born: 10 February 1970 (age 56) Wrocław, Poland

Sport
- Sport: Boxing
Medal record
Men's amateur boxing
Representing Poland
European Championships
Bronze medal – third place	1991 Gothenburg	Middleweight

Robert Buda (born 10 February 1970) is a Polish boxer. He competed in the men's middleweight event at the 1992 Summer Olympics.
