= Wang Hong (archer) =

Chinese archer (born 1965)

Personal information
- Born: 22 May 1965 (age 61)
Medal record
Women's archery
Representing China
Olympic Games
Silver medal – second place	1992 Barcelona	Team

Wang Hong (Chinese: 王红; pinyin: Wáng Hóng, born 22 May 1965) is an archer from the People's Republic of China. She represented China at the 1992 Olympic Games, winning a team silver
