= Séverine Bonal =

French archer (born 1972)

Personal information
- Nationality: French
- Born: 13 February 1972 (age 54) Montpellier, France

Sport
- Sport: Archery

Séverine Bonal (born 13 February 1972) is a French archer. She competed at the 1992 Summer Olympics and the 1996 Summer Olympics.
