= Albert Papilaya =

Indonesian boxer (1967–2021)

Personal information
- Nationality: Indonesian
- Born: 15 September 1967 Tobelo, North Maluku, Indonesia
- Died: 18 April 2021 (aged 53) Ternate, North Maluku, Indonesia

Sport
- Sport: Boxing
Medal record
Men's boxing
Representing Indonesia
SEA Games
Gold medal – first place	2001 Kuala Lumpur	Light Heavyweight

Albert Papilaya (15 September 1967 – 18 April 2021) was an Indonesian boxer. He competed in the men's middleweight event at the 1992 Summer Olympics.
