= Keiko Nakagomi =

Japanese archer (born 1970)

Personal information
- Nationality: Japanese
- Born: 12 June 1970 (age 56) Tokyo, Japan

Sport
- Sport: Archery

Keiko Nakagomi (中込恵子, Nakagomi Keiko; born 12 June 1970) is a Japanese archer. She competed at the 1988 Summer Olympics and the 1992 Summer Olympics.
