= Ahmed Dine =

Algerian boxer (born 1965)

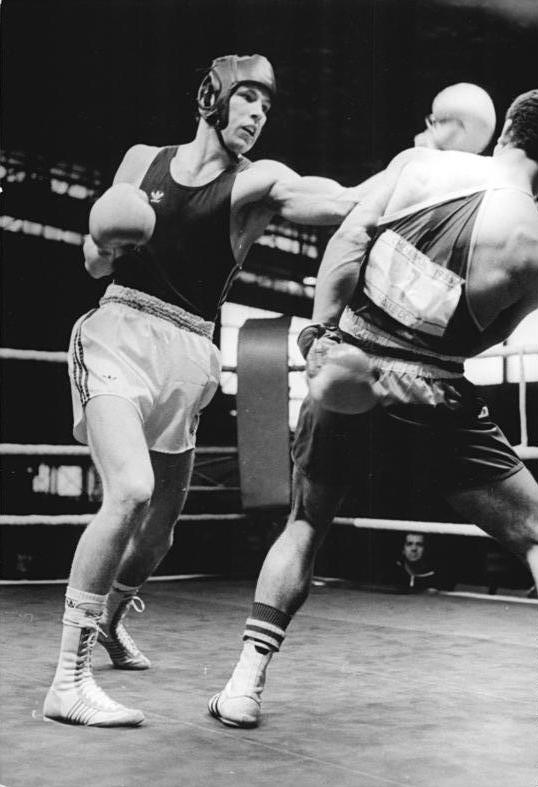
- Ahmed Dine (right) fighting East Germany's Henry Maske

Personal information
- Nationality: Algerian
- Born: 22 January 1965 (age 60); Bouharoun, Algeria

Sport
- Sport: Boxing

Ahmed Dine (born 22 January 1965) is an Algerian boxer. He competed at the 1988 Summer Olympics and the 1992 Summer Olympics.
