= Jacqueline van Rozendaal-van Gerven =

Dutch archer (born 1964)

Personal information
- Nationality: Dutch
- Born: 20 February 1964 (age 61); Hintham, Netherlands

Sport
- Sport: Archery

Jacqueline van Rozendaal-van Gerven (born 20 February 1964) is a Dutch archer. She competed at the 1988 Summer Olympics and the 1992 Summer Olympics.
