= Cho Youn-jeong =

South Korean archer (born 1969)

Personal information
- Native name: 조•윤정
- Born: September 29, 1969 (age 56)

Sport
- Country: South Korea
- Sport: Archery
- Event: Recurve
Medal record
Representing South Korea
Women's archery
Olympic Games
Gold medal – first place	1992 Barcelona	Individual
Gold medal – first place	1992 Barcelona	Team
World Championships
Gold medal – first place	1991 Krakow	Team
Gold medal – first place	1993 Antalya	Team
Silver medal – second place	1993 Antalya	Individual

- Cho Youn-jeong
- Hangul: 조윤정
- RR: Jo Yunjeong
- MR: Cho Yunjŏng

Cho Youn-jeong (Korean: 조윤정; born September 29, 1969) is a South Korean archer. A two-time Olympic gold medalist, she achieved both her gold medals at the 1992 Summer Olympics in Barcelona. She also won an individual silver medal at the 1993 World Archery Championships, as well as a gold medal with the team.

== Career ==
=== 1992 Summer Olympics ===
Cho contested the 1992 Summer Olympics as a member of the South Korean women's archery team with Kim Soo-nyung and Lee Eun-kyung. During the ranking round of the women's individual competition she set two Olympic records, scoring 338 points from a distance of 70 metres and 345 points from a distance of 60 metres. Cho and her teammates' total combined score of 4,094 points was additionally a new Olympic record for the women's team competition.

Cho defeated Kim, the defending Olympic champion, in the final of the women's individual event, outshooting her teammate by seven points to claim the gold medal. She later achieved her second gold medal in the women's team event after the South Korean team defeated China.
