= Tímea Kiss =

Hungarian archer (born 1973)

Personal information
- Nationality: Hungarian
- Born: 19 January 1973 (age 53) Budapest, Hungary

Sport
- Sport: Archery

Tímea Kiss (born 19 January 1973) is a Hungarian archer. She competed at the 1992 Summer Olympics and the 1996 Summer Olympics.
