= Chiang Tai-chuan =

Taiwanese baseball player

- Catcher/Outfielder
- Born: October 26, 1960 (age 65); Chiayi County, Taiwan
- Batted: Right Threw: Right

CPBL debut
- March 12, 1993, for the Uni-President Lions

Last appearance
- October 19, 1996, for the Uni-President Lions

CPBL statistics
- Batting average: .278
- Home runs: 5
- Runs batted in: 118

Teams
- As player: Uni-President Lions (1993–1996); As manager: Tianjin Lions (2014–2021); As coach: Tianjin Lions (2000–2009, 2012–2013); Guangdong Leopards (2010–2011)

Career highlights and awards
- 2x CPBL All-Star (1993–1994)
Medals
Representing Chinese Taipei
Men's baseball
Olympic Games
| Silver medal – second place | 1992 Barcelona | Team |

Chiang Tai-chuan (Chinese: 江泰權; pinyin: Jiāng Tàiquán; born 26 October 1960 in Chiayi County, Taiwan) is a Taiwanese retired professional baseball player and baseball coach. He is best known for being the first baseball player to compete in three consecutive Olympic Games: in the 1984, 1988 and 1992 Olympics where he won a bronze medal in 1984 (as a demonstration sport) and a silver medal in 1992.

A member of the China Times Eagles' amateur forerunner, the Black Eagles, since 1990, after the 1992 Summer Olympics Chiang planned to join CPBL along with this soon-to-be-professionalized club. However, in November 1992, the Eagles accidentally traded him to the Uni-President Lions due to their unfamiliarity with CPBL's trading rules. Chiang stayed with the Lions until the end of the 1996 season. Before CPBL's 1997 season started, he planned to transfer to then just-established Koos Groups Whales, but also at this time CPBL expelled him after it was determined that he was involved in the Black Eagles Incident. Chiang was forced to retire after this scandal and he later found a coaching job in the China Baseball League.

== Statistics ==
In the 1992 Olympics:

| hitting average | Games | At bat | Runs | Hits | RBI | Double | Triple | HR | K | Walk |
| .310 | 9 | 29 | 2 | 9 | 4 | 4 | 0 | 0 | 5 | 8 |

CPBL career:

| Year | Club | Games | At bat | Runs | Hits | Double | Triple | HR | RBI | Total bases | Walk | K | Stolen Base | Caught Stealing | Hitting Average |
| 1993 | Uni-President Lions | 88 | 319 | 38 | 100 | 21 | 0 | 1 | 39 | 124 | 23 | 25 | 20 | 19 | 0.313 |
| 1994 | Uni-President Lions | 56 | 183 | 17 | 44 | 5 | 0 | 1 | 26 | 52 | 18 | 14 | 3 | 3 | 0.240 |
| 1995 | Uni-President Lions | 99 | 317 | 30 | 82 | 12 | 0 | 1 | 29 | 97 | 29 | 21 | 12 | 6 | 0.259 |
| 1996 | Uni-President Lions | 88 | 274 | 30 | 78 | 18 | 0 | 2 | 24 | 102 | 23 | 17 | 8 | 4 | 0.285 |
