= Nathalie Hibon =

French archer (born 1969)

Personal information
- Nationality: French
- Born: 24 April 1969 (age 57) Meaux, France

Sport
- Sport: Archery

Nathalie Hibon (born 24 April 1969) is a French archer. She competed at the 1988 Summer Olympics and the 1992 Summer Olympics.
