= List of 1996 Summer Olympics medal winners =

This is a list of medalists at the 1996 Summer Olympics in Atlanta, USA:

== Aquatics ==
=== Diving ===
Event	Gold	Silver	Bronze
Men's 3 metre springboard	Xiong Ni; China	Yu Zhuocheng; China	Mark Lenzi; United States
Women's 3 metre springboard	Fu Mingxia; China	Irina Lashko; Russia	Annie Pelletier; Canada
Men's 10 metre platform	Dmitri Sautin; Russia	Jan Hempel; Germany	Xiao Hailiang; China
Women's 10 metre platform	Fu Mingxia; China	Annika Walter; Germany	Mary Ellen Clark; United States

=== Swimming ===
Event	Gold	Silver	Bronze
Men's 50 metre freestyle	Alexander Popov; Russia	Gary Hall Jr. United States	Fernando Scherer; Brazil
Men's 100 metre freestyle	Alexander Popov; Russia	Gary Hall Jr. United States	Gustavo Borges; Brazil
Men's 200 metre freestyle	Danyon Loader; New Zealand	Gustavo Borges; Brazil	Daniel Kowalski; Australia
Men's 400 metre freestyle	Danyon Loader; New Zealand	Paul Palmer; Great Britain	Daniel Kowalski; Australia
Men's 1500 metre freestyle	Kieren Perkins; Australia	Daniel Kowalski; Australia	Graeme Smith; Great Britain
Men's 100 metre backstroke	Jeff Rouse; United States	Rodolfo Falcón; Cuba	Neisser Bent; Cuba
Women's 100 metre backstroke	Beth Botsford; United States	Whitney Hedgepeth; United States	Marianne Kriel; South Africa
Men's 200 metre backstroke	Brad Bridgewater; United States	Tripp Schwenk; United States	Emanuele Merisi; Italy
Women's 200 metre backstroke	Krisztina Egerszegi; Hungary	Whitney Hedgepeth; United States	Cathleen Rund; Germany
Men's 100 metre breaststroke	Fred Deburghgraeve; Belgium	Jeremy Linn; United States	Mark Warnecke; Germany
Women's 100 metre breaststroke	Penelope Heyns; South Africa	Amanda Beard; United States	Samantha Riley; Australia
Men's 200 metre breaststroke	Norbert Rózsa; Hungary	Károly Güttler; Hungary	Andrey Korneyev; Russia
Women's 200 metre breaststroke	Penelope Heyns; South Africa	Amanda Beard; United States	Ágnes Kovács; Hungary
Men's 100 metre butterfly	Denis Pankratov; Russia	Scott Miller; Australia	Vladislav Kulikov; Russia
Women's 100 metre butterfly	Amy Van Dyken; United States	Liu Limin; China	Angel Martino; United States
Men's 200 metre butterfly	Denis Pankratov; Russia	Tom Malchow; United States	Scott Goodman; Australia
Women's 200 metre butterfly	Susie O'Neill; Australia	Petria Thomas; Australia	Michelle Smith; Ireland
Men's 200 metre individual medley	Attila Czene; Hungary	Jani Sievinen; Finland	Curtis Myden; Canada
Women's 200 metre individual medley	Michelle Smith; Ireland	Marianne Limpert; Canada	Lin Li; China
Men's 400 metre individual medley	Tom Dolan; United States	Eric Namesnik; United States	Curtis Myden; Canada
Women's 400 metre individual medley	Michelle Smith; Ireland	Allison Wagner; United States	Krisztina Egerszegi; Hungary
Men's 4 × 100 metre freestyle relay	United States; Jon Olsen; Josh Davis; Brad Schumacher; Gary Hall Jr. David Fox*; Scott Tucker*	Russia; Roman Yegorov; Alexander Popov; Vladimir Predkin; Vladimir Pyshnenko; Denis Pimankov*	Germany; Christian Tröger; Bengt Zikarsky; Björn Zikarsky; Mark Pinger; Alexander Lüderitz*
Women's 4 × 100 metre freestyle relay	United States; Angel Martino; Amy Van Dyken; Catherine Fox; Jenny Thompson; Lisa Jacob*; Melanie Valerio*	China; Le Jingyi; Chao Na; Nian Yun; Shan Ying	Germany; Sandra Völker; Simone Osygus; Antje Buschschulte; Franziska van Almsick; Meike Freitag*
Men's 4 × 200 metre freestyle relay	United States; Josh Davis; Joe Hudepohl; Brad Schumacher; Ryan Berube; Jon Olsen*	Sweden; Christer Wallin; Anders Holmertz; Lars Frölander; Anders Lyrbring	Germany; Aimo Heilmann; Christian Keller; Christian Tröger; Steffen Zesner; Konstantin Dubrovin*; Oliver Lampe*
Women's 4 × 200 metre freestyle relay	United States; Trina Jackson; Cristina Teuscher; Sheila Taormina; Jenny Thompson; Lisa Jacob*; Annette Salmeen*; Ashley Whitney*	Germany; Franziska van Almsick; Kerstin Kielgass; Anke Scholz; Dagmar Hase; Meike Freitag*; Simone Osygus*	Australia; Julia Greville; Nicole Stevenson; Emma Johnson; Susie O'Neill; Lise Mackie*
Men's 4 × 100 metre medley relay	United States; Jeff Rouse; Jeremy Linn; Mark Henderson; Gary Hall Jr. Josh Davis*; Kurt Grote*; John Hargis*; Tripp Schwenk*	Russia; Vladimir Selkov; Stanislav Lopukhov; Denis Pankratov; Alexander Popov; Roman Ivanovsky*; Vladislav Kulikov*; Roman Yegorov*	Australia; Steven Dewick; Phil Rogers; Scott Miller; Michael Klim; Toby Haenen*
Women's 4 × 100 metre medley relay	United States; Beth Botsford; Amanda Beard; Angel Martino; Amy Van Dyken; Catherine Fox*; Whitney Hedgepeth*; Kristine Quance*; Jenny Thompson*	Australia; Nicole Stevenson; Samantha Riley; Susie O'Neill; Sarah Ryan; Helen Denman*; Angela Kennedy*	China; Chen Yan; Han Xue; Cai Huijue; Shan Ying
Women's 50 metre freestyle	Amy Van Dyken; United States	Le Jingyi; China	Sandra Völker; Germany
Women's 100 metre freestyle	Le Jingyi; China	Sandra Völker; Germany	Angel Martino; United States
Women's 200 metre freestyle	Claudia Poll; Costa Rica	Franziska van Almsick; Germany	Dagmar Hase; Germany
Women's 400 metre freestyle	Michelle Smith; Ireland	Dagmar Hase; Germany	Kirsten Vlieghuis; Netherlands
Women's 800 metre freestyle	Brooke Bennett; United States	Dagmar Hase; Germany	Kirsten Vlieghuis; Netherlands

* Swimmers who participated in the heats only and received medals.

=== Synchronized swimming ===
Event	Gold	Silver	Bronze
Women's team	United States; Suzannah Bianco; Tammy Cleland; Becky Dyroen-Lancer; Heather Pease; Jill Savery; Nathalie Schneyder; Heather Simmons-Carrasco; Jill Sudduth; Emily LeSueur; Margot Thien	Canada; Karen Clark; Sylvie Fréchette; Janice Bremner; Karen Fonteyne; Christine Larsen; Erin Woodley; Cari Read; Lisa Alexander; Valerie Hould-Marchand; Kasia Kulesza	Japan; Miya Tachibana; Akiko Kawase; Rei Jimbo; Miho Takeda; Raika Fujii; Miho Kawabe; Junko Tanaka; Riho Nakajima; Mayuko Fujiki; Kaori Takahashi

=== Water polo ===
Event	Gold	Silver	Bronze
Men's team	Spain; Josep María Abarca; Ángel Andreo; Daniel Ballart; Pedro Francisco García; Salvador Gómez; Manuel Estiarte; Iván Moro; Miguel Ángel Oca; Jorge Payá; Sergi Pedrerol; Jesús Rollán; Jordi Sans; Carles Sans	Croatia; Maro Balić; Perica Bukić; Damir Glavan; Igor Hinić; Vjekoslav Kobešćak; Joško Kreković; Ognjen Kržić; Dubravko Šimenc; Siniša Školneković; Ratko Štritof; Renato Vrbičić; Tino Vegar; Zdeslav Vrdoljak	Italy; Alberto Angelini; Francesco Attolico; Fabio Bencivenga; Alessandro Bovo; Alessandro Calcaterra; Roberto Calcaterra; Marco Gerini; Alberto Ghibellini; Luca Giustolisi; Amedeo Pomilio; Francesco Postiglione; Carlo Silipo; Leonardo Sottani

== Archery ==
Event	Gold	Silver	Bronze
Men's individual	Justin Huish; United States	Magnus Petersson; Sweden	Oh Kyo-Moon; South Korea
Men's team	United States; Justin Huish; Butch Johnson; Rod White	South Korea; Jang Yong-Ho; Kim Bo-Ram; Oh Kyo-Moon	Italy; Matteo Bisiani; Michele Frangilli; Andrea Parenti
Women's individual	Kim Kyung-Wook; South Korea	He Ying; China	Olena Sadovnycha; Ukraine
Women's team	South Korea; Kim Jo-Sun; Kim Kyung-Wook; Yoon Hye-Young	Germany; Barbara Mensing; Cornelia Pfohl; Sandra Wagner-Sachse	Poland; Iwona Dzięcioł; Katarzyna Klata; Joanna Nowicka

== Athletics ==
=== Track ===
Event	Gold	Silver	Bronze
Men's 100 metres	Donovan Bailey; Canada	Frankie Fredericks; Namibia	Ato Boldon; Trinidad and Tobago
Women's 100 metres	Gail Devers; United States	Merlene Ottey; Jamaica	Gwen Torrence; United States
Men's 200 metres	Michael Johnson; United States	Frankie Fredericks; Namibia	Ato Boldon; Trinidad and Tobago
Women's 200 metres	Marie-José Pérec; France	Merlene Ottey; Jamaica	Mary Onyali; Nigeria
Men's 400 metres	Michael Johnson; United States	Roger Black; Great Britain	Davis Kamoga; Uganda
Women's 400 metres	Marie-José Pérec; France	Cathy Freeman; Australia	Falilat Ogunkoya; Nigeria
Men's 800 metres	Vebjørn Rodal; Norway	Hezekiél Sepeng; South Africa	Fred Onyancha; Kenya
Women's 800 metres	Svetlana Masterkova; Russia	Ana Fidelia Quirot; Cuba	Maria de Lurdes Mutola; Mozambique
Men's 1500 metres	Noureddine Morceli; Algeria	Fermín Cacho; Spain	Stephen Kipkorir; Kenya
Women's 1500 metres	Svetlana Masterkova; Russia	Gabriela Szabo; Romania	Theresia Kiesl; Austria
Men's 5000 metres	Vénuste Niyongabo; Burundi	Paul Bitok; Kenya	Khalid Boulami; Morocco
Women's 5000 metres	Wang Junxia; China	Pauline Konga; Kenya	Roberta Brunet; Italy
Men's 10,000 metres	Haile Gebrselassie; Ethiopia	Paul Tergat; Kenya	Salah Hissou; Morocco
Women's 10,000 metres	Fernanda Ribeiro; Portugal	Wang Junxia; China	Gete Wami; Ethiopia
Men's 110 metres hurdles	Allen Johnson; United States	Mark Crear; United States	Florian Schwarthoff; Germany
Women's 100 metres hurdles	Ludmila Engquist; Sweden	Brigita Bukovec; Slovenia	Patricia Girard; France
Men's 400 metres hurdles	Derrick Adkins; United States	Samuel Matete; Zambia	Calvin Davis; United States
Women's 400 metres hurdles	Deon Hemmings; Jamaica	Kim Batten; United States	Tonja Buford-Bailey; United States
Men's 3000 m steeplechase	Joseph Keter; Kenya	Moses Kiptanui; Kenya	Alessandro Lambruschini; Italy
Men's 4 × 100 metres relay	Canada; Robert Esmie; Glenroy Gilbert; Bruny Surin; Donovan Bailey; Carlton Chambers*	United States; Jon Drummond; Tim Harden; Michael Marsh; Dennis Mitchell; Tim Montgomery*	Brazil; Arnaldo da Silva; Robson da Silva; Édson Ribeiro; André da Silva
Women's 4 × 100 metres relay	United States; Chryste Gaines; Gail Devers; Inger Miller; Gwen Torrence; Carlette Guidry*	Bahamas; Eldece Clarke; Chandra Sturrup; Savatheda Fynes; Pauline Davis-Thompson; Debbie Ferguson*	Jamaica; Michelle Freeman; Juliet Cuthbert; Nikole Mitchell; Merlene Ottey; Gillian Russell*; Andria Lloyd*
Men's 4 × 400 metres relay	United States; LaMont Smith; Alvin Harrison; Derek Mills; Anthuan Maybank; Jason Rouser*	Great Britain; Iwan Thomas; Jamie Baulch; Mark Richardson; Roger Black; Mark Hylton*; Du'aine Ladejo*	Jamaica; Michael McDonald; Greg Haughton; Roxbert Martin; Davian Clarke; Dennis Blake*; Garth Robinson*
Women's 4 × 400 metres relay	United States; Rochelle Stevens; Maicel Malone-Wallace; Kim Graham; Jearl Miles; Linetta Wilson*	Nigeria; Olabisi Afolabi; Fatima Yusuf; Charity Opara; Falilat Ogunkoya	Germany; Uta Rohländer; Linda Kisabaka; Anja Rücker; Grit Breuer

* Athletes who participated in the heats only and received medals.

=== Road ===
Event	Gold	Silver	Bronze
Women's 10 kilometres walk	Yelena Nikolayeva; Russia	Elisabetta Perrone; Italy	Wang Yan; China
Men's 20 kilometres walk	Jefferson Pérez; Ecuador	Ilya Markov; Russia	Bernardo Segura; Mexico
Men's 50 kilometres walk	Robert Korzeniowski; Poland	Mikhail Shchennikov; Russia	Valentí Massana; Spain
Men's Marathon	Josia Thugwane; South Africa	Lee Bong-Ju; South Korea	Erick Wainaina; Kenya
Women's Marathon	Fatuma Roba; Ethiopia	Valentina Yegorova; Russia	Yuko Arimori; Japan

=== Field ===
Event	Gold	Silver	Bronze
Men's High jump	Charles Austin; United States	Artur Partyka; Poland	Steve Smith; Great Britain
Women's High jump	Stefka Kostadinova; Bulgaria	Niki Bakoyianni; Greece	Inha Babakova; Ukraine
Men's Long jump	Carl Lewis; United States	James Beckford; Jamaica	Joe Greene; United States
Women's Long jump	Chioma Ajunwa; Nigeria	Fiona May; Italy	Jackie Joyner-Kersee; United States
Men's Triple jump	Kenny Harrison; United States	Jonathan Edwards; Great Britain	Yoelbi Quesada; Cuba
Women's Triple jump	Inessa Kravets; Ukraine	Inna Lasovskaya; Russia	Šárka Kašpárková; Czech Republic
Men's Pole vault	Jean Galfione; France	Igor Trandenkov; Russia	Andrei Tivontchik; Germany
Men's Shot put	Randy Barnes; United States	John Godina; United States	Oleksandr Bagach; Ukraine
Women's Shot put	Astrid Kumbernuss; Germany	Sui Xinmei; China	Irina Khudoroshkina; Russia
Men's discus throw	Lars Riedel; Germany	Vladimir Dubrovshchik; Belarus	Vasiliy Kaptyukh; Belarus
Women's discus throw	Ilke Wyludda; Germany	Natalya Sadova; Russia	Ellina Zvereva; Belarus
Men's javelin throw	Jan Železný; Czech Republic	Steve Backley; Great Britain	Seppo Räty; Finland
Women's javelin throw	Heli Rantanen; Finland	Louise McPaul; Australia	Trine Hattestad; Norway
Men's Hammer throw	Balázs Kiss; Hungary	Lance Deal; United States	Oleksandr Krykun; Ukraine
Men's decathlon	Dan O'Brien; United States	Frank Busemann; Germany	Tomáš Dvořák; Czech Republic
Women's Heptathlon	Ghada Shouaa; Syria	Natallia Sazanovich; Belarus	Denise Lewis; Great Britain

== Baseball ==
Event	Gold	Silver	Bronze
Men's team	Cuba; Juan Manrique Garcia; Orestes Kindelán; Antonio Scull; Alberto Hernández; Antonio Pacheco Massó; Juan Padilla; Omar Linares; Lazaro Vargas Alverez; Miguel Caldés Luis; Eduardo Paret; José Estrada González; Rey Isaac Vaillant; Luis Ulacia Alverez; Pedro Luis Lazo; Eliecer Montes de Oca; José Contreras; Omar Luis Martinez; Omar Ajete; Ormari Romero; Jorge Fumero	Japan; Masahiko Mori; Jutaro Kimura; Masao Morinaka; Hitoshi Ono; Takashi Kurosu; Masahiro Nojima; Makoto Imaoka; Kosuke Fukudome; Takayuki Takabayashi; Yasuyuki Saigo; Masanori Sugiura; Takeo Kawamura; Koichi Misawa; Hideaki Okubo; Nobuhiko Matsunaka; Tadahito Iguchi; Takao Kuwamoto; Daishin Nakamura; Tomoaki Sato; Yoshitomo Tani	United States; Kris Benson; R. A. Dickey; Troy Glaus; Chad Green; Seth Greisinger; Travis Lee; Augie Ojeda; Jason Williams; Chad Allen; Kip Harkrider; A. J. Hinch; Jacque Jones; Mark Kotsay; Matt LeCroy; Braden Looper; Brian Loyd; Warren Morris; Jeff Weaver; Jim Parque; Billy Koch

== Badminton ==
Event	Gold	Silver	Bronze
Men's singles	Poul-Erik Høyer Larsen (DEN)	Dong Jiong (CHN)	Rashid Sidek (MAS)
Women's singles	Bang Soo-hyun (KOR)	Mia Audina (INA)	Susi Susanti (INA)
Men's doubles	Ricky Subagja and Rexy Mainaky (INA)	Cheah Soon Kit and Yap Kim Hock (MAS)	Denny Kantono and Antonius Ariantho (INA)
Women's doubles	Ge Fei and Gu Jun (CHN)	Gil Young-ah and Jang Hye-ock (KOR)	Qin Yiyuan and Tang Yongshu (CHN)
Mixed doubles	Kim Dong-moon and Gil Young-ah (KOR)	Park Joo-bong and Ra Kyung-min (KOR)	Liu Jianjun and Sun Man (CHN)

== Basketball ==
Event	Gold	Silver	Bronze
Men's	United States; Charles Barkley; Penny Hardaway; Grant Hill; Hakeem Olajuwon; Karl Malone; Reggie Miller; Shaquille O'Neal; Gary Payton; Scottie Pippen; Mitch Richmond; David Robinson; John Stockton	FR Yugoslavia; Dejan Tomašević; Miroslav Berić; Dejan Bodiroga; Željko Rebrača; Predrag Danilović; Vlade Divac; Aleksandar Đorđević; Saša Obradović; Žarko Paspalj; Zoran Savić; Nikola Lončar; Milenko Topić	Lithuania; Arvydas Sabonis; Rimas Kurtinaitis; Darius Lukminas; Saulius Štombergas; Eurelijus Žukauskas; Šarūnas Marčiulionis; Mindaugas Žukauskas; Gintaras Einikis; Andrius Jurkūnas; Artūras Karnišovas; Rytis Vaišvila; Tomas Pačėsas
Women's	United States; Teresa Edwards; Dawn Staley; Ruthie Bolton; Sheryl Swoopes; Jennifer Azzi; Lisa Leslie; Carla McGhee; Katy Steding; Katrina Felicia McClain; Rebecca Lobo; Venus Lacy; Nikki McCray	Brazil; Hortência Marcari Oliva; Maria Angélica; Adriana Aparecida Santos; Leila Sobral; Maria Paula Silva; Janeth Arcain; Roseli Gustavo; Marta Sobral; Silvinha; Alessandra Oliveira; Cintia Santos; Claudia Maria Pastor	Australia; Robyn Maher; Allison Cook; Sandy Brondello; Michele Timms; Shelley Sandie; Trisha Fallon; Michelle Chandler; Fiona Robinson; Carla Boyd; Jenny Whittle; Rachael Sporn; Michelle Brogan

== Boxing ==
Event	Gold	Silver	Bronze
Light flyweight (48 kg)	Daniel Petrov; Bulgaria	Mansueto Velasco; Philippines	Oleg Kiryukhin; Ukraine
Light flyweight (48 kg)	Daniel Petrov; Bulgaria	Mansueto Velasco; Philippines	Rafael Lozano; Spain
Flyweight (51 kg)	Maikro Romero; Cuba	Bolat Dzhumadilov; Kazakhstan	Zoltan Lunka; Germany
Flyweight (51 kg)	Maikro Romero; Cuba	Bolat Dzhumadilov; Kazakhstan	Albert Pakeyev; Russia
Bantamweight (54 kg)	István Kovács; Hungary	Arnaldo Mesa; Cuba	Vichai Khadpo; Thailand
Bantamweight (54 kg)	István Kovács; Hungary	Arnaldo Mesa; Cuba	Raimkul Malakhbekov; Russia
Featherweight (57 kg)	Kamsing Somluck; Thailand	Serafim Todorov; Bulgaria	Pablo Chacón; Argentina
Featherweight (57 kg)	Kamsing Somluck; Thailand	Serafim Todorov; Bulgaria	Floyd Mayweather Jr. United States
Lightweight (60 kg)	Hocine Soltani; Algeria	Tontcho Tontchev; Bulgaria	Terrance Cauthen; United States
Lightweight (60 kg)	Hocine Soltani; Algeria	Tontcho Tontchev; Bulgaria	Leonard Doroftei; Romania
Light welterweight (63.5 kg)	Héctor Vinent; Cuba	Oktay Urkal; Germany	Fathi Missaoui; Tunisia
Light welterweight (63.5 kg)	Héctor Vinent; Cuba	Oktay Urkal; Germany	Bolat Niyazymbetov; Kazakhstan
Welterweight (67 kg)	Oleg Saitov; Russia	Juan Hernández Sierra; Cuba	Daniel Santos; Puerto Rico
Welterweight (67 kg)	Oleg Saitov; Russia	Juan Hernández Sierra; Cuba	Marian Simion; Romania
Light middleweight (71 kg)	David Reid; United States	Alfredo Duvergel; Cuba	Yermakhan Ibraimov; Kazakhstan
Light middleweight (71 kg)	David Reid; United States	Alfredo Duvergel; Cuba	Karim Tulaganov; Uzbekistan
Middleweight (75 kg)	Ariel Hernández; Cuba	Malik Beyleroğlu; Turkey	Rhoshii Wells; United States
Middleweight (75 kg)	Ariel Hernández; Cuba	Malik Beyleroğlu; Turkey	Mohamed Bahari; Algeria
Light heavyweight (81 kg)	Vasilii Jirov; Kazakhstan	Lee Seung-Bae; South Korea	Antonio Tarver; United States
Light heavyweight (81 kg)	Vasilii Jirov; Kazakhstan	Lee Seung-Bae; South Korea	Thomas Ulrich; Germany
Heavyweight (91 kg)	Félix Savón; Cuba	David Defiagbon; Canada	Nate Jones; United States
Heavyweight (91 kg)	Félix Savón; Cuba	David Defiagbon; Canada	Luan Krasniqi; Germany
Super heavyweight (+91 kg)	Wladimir Klitschko; Ukraine	Paea Wolfgram; Tonga	Duncan Dokiwari; Nigeria
Super heavyweight (+91 kg)	Wladimir Klitschko; Ukraine	Paea Wolfgram; Tonga	Alexei Lezin; Russia

== Canoeing ==
=== Slalom ===
Event	Gold	Silver	Bronze
Men's slalom C-1	Michal Martikán; Slovakia	Lukáš Pollert; Czech Republic	Patrice Estanguet; France
Men's slalom C-2	France; Frank Adisson; Wilfrid Forgues	Czech Republic; Jiří Rohan; Miroslav Šimek	Germany; André Ehrenberg; Michael Senft
Men's slalom K-1	Oliver Fix; Germany	Andraž Vehovar; Slovenia	Thomas Becker; Germany
Women's slalom K-1	Štěpánka Hilgertová; Czech Republic	Dana Chladek; United States	Myriam Fox-Jerusalmi; France

=== Sprint ===
Event	Gold	Silver	Bronze
Men's C-1 500 metres	Martin Doktor; Czech Republic	Slavomír Kňazovický; Slovakia	Imre Pulai; Hungary
Men's C-1 1000 metres	Martin Doktor; Czech Republic	Ivans Klementjevs; Latvia	György Zala; Hungary
Men's C-2 500 metres	Hungary; György Kolonics; Csaba Horváth	Moldova; Viktor Reneysky; Nicolae Juravschi	Romania; Grigore Obreja; Gheorghe Andriev
Men's C-2 1000 metres	Germany; Gunar Kirchbach; Andreas Dittmer	Romania; Marcel Glăvan; Antonel Borșan	Hungary; György Kolonics; Csaba Horváth
Men's K-1 500 metres	Antonio Rossi; Italy	Knut Holmann; Norway	Piotr Markiewicz; Poland
Men's K-1 1000 metres	Knut Holmann; Norway	Beniamino Bonomi; Italy	Clint Robinson; Australia
Men's K-2 500 metres	Germany; Kay Bluhm; Torsten Gutsche	Italy; Beniamino Bonomi; Daniele Scarpa	Australia; Andrew Trim; Daniel Collins
Men's K-2 1000 metres	Italy; Daniele Scarpa; Antonio Rossi	Germany; Kay Bluhm; Torsten Gutsche	Bulgaria; Andrian Dushev; Milko Kazanov
Men's K-4 1000 metres	Germany; Thomas Reineck; Olaf Winter; Detlef Hofmann; Mark Zabel	Hungary; András Rajna; Gábor Horváth; Ferenc Csipes; Attila Adrovicz	Russia; Oleg Gorobiy; Sergey Verlin; Georgiy Tsybulnikov; Anatoli Tishchenko
Women's K-1 500 metres	Rita Kőbán; Hungary	Caroline Brunet; Canada	Josefa Idem; Italy
Women's K-2 500 metres	Sweden; Susanne Gunnarsson; Agneta Andersson	Germany; Birgit Fischer; Ramona Portwich	Australia; Anna Wood; Katrin Borchert
Women's K-4 500 metres	Germany; Anett Schuck; Birgit Fischer; Manuela Mucke; Ramona Portwich	Switzerland; Gabi Müller; Ingrid Haralamow; Sabine Eichenberger; Daniela Baumer	Sweden; Susanne Rosenqvist; Anna Olsson; Ingela Ericsson; Agneta Andersson

== Cycling ==
=== Road ===
Event	Gold	Silver	Bronze
Men's road race	Pascal Richard; Switzerland	Rolf Sørensen; Denmark	Max Sciandri; Great Britain
Women's road race	Jeannie Longo; France	Imelda Chiappa; Italy	Clara Hughes; Canada
Men's time trial	Miguel Induráin; Spain	Abraham Olano; Spain	Chris Boardman; Great Britain
Women's time trial	Zulfiya Zabirova; Russia	Jeannie Longo; France	Clara Hughes; Canada

=== Track ===
Event	Gold	Silver	Bronze
Men's 1,000 metre time trial	Florian Rousseau; France	Erin Hartwell; United States	Takanobu Jumonji; Japan
Men's 1,000 metre sprint	Jens Fiedler; Germany	Marty Nothstein; United States	Curt Harnett; Canada
Women's 1,000 metre sprint	Félicia Ballanger; France	Michelle Ferris; Australia	Ingrid Haringa; Netherlands
Women's 3,000 metre pursuit	Antonella Bellutti; Italy	Marion Clignet; France	Judith Arndt; Germany
Men's 4,000 metre pursuit	Andrea Collinelli; Italy	Philippe Ermenault; France	Bradley McGee; Australia
Women's 24 kilometre points race	Nathalie Lancien; France	Ingrid Haringa; Netherlands	Lucy Tyler-Sharman; Australia
Men's 40 kilometre points race	Silvio Martinello; Italy	Brian Walton; Canada	Stuart O'Grady; Australia
Men's 4,000 metre team pursuit	France; Christophe Capelle; Philippe Ermenault; Jean-Michel Monin; Francis Moreau	Russia; Eduard Gritsun; Nikolay Kuznetsov; Alexei Markov; Anton Shantyr	Australia; Brett Aitken; Stuart O'Grady; Timothy O'Shannessey; Dean Woods

=== Mountain bike ===
Event	Gold	Silver	Bronze
Men's cross-country	Bart Brentjens; Netherlands	Thomas Frischknecht; Switzerland	Miguel Martinez; France
Women's cross-country	Paola Pezzo; Italy	Alison Sydor; Canada	Susan DeMattei; United States

== Equestrian ==
Event	Gold	Silver	Bronze
Individual dressage	Isabell Werth; Germany	Anky van Grunsven; Netherlands	Sven Rothenberger; Netherlands
Team dressage	Germany; Klaus Balkenhol; Martin Schaudt; Monica Theodorescu; Isabell Werth	Netherlands; Tineke Bartels; Anky van Grunsven; Sven Rothenberger; Gonnelien Rothenberger	United States; Robert Dover; Michelle Gibson; Steffen Peters; Guenter Seidel
Individual eventing	Blyth Tait; New Zealand	Sally Clark; New Zealand	Kerry Millikin; United States
Team eventing	Australia; Wendy Schaeffer; Gillian Rolton; Andrew Hoy; Phillip Dutton	United States; Karen O'Connor; David O'Connor; Bruce Davidson; Jill Henneberg	New Zealand; Blyth Tait; Andrew Nicholson; Vaughn Jefferis; Victoria Latta
Individual jumping	Ulrich Kirchhoff; Germany	Wilhelm Melliger; Switzerland	Alexandra Ledermann; France
Team jumping	Germany; Franke Sloothaak; Lars Nieberg; Ulrich Kirchhoff; Ludger Beerbaum	United States; Peter Leone; Leslie Burr-Howard; Anne Kursinski; Michael R. Matz	Brazil; Luiz Felipe de Azevedo; Álvaro Miranda Neto; André Johannpeter; Rodrigo Pessoa

== Fencing ==
Event	Gold	Silver	Bronze
Men's individual épée	Aleksandr Beketov; Russia	Ivan Trevejo; Cuba	Géza Imre; Hungary
Women's individual épée	Laura Flessel; France	Valerie Barlois; France	Gyöngyi Szalay; Hungary
Men's team épée	Italy; Sandro Cuomo; Angelo Mazzoni; Maurizio Randazzo	Russia; Aleksandr Beketov; Pavel Kolobkov; Valery Zakharevich	France; Jean-Michel Henry; Robert Leroux; Éric Srecki
Women's team épée	France; Laura Flessel; Sophie Moresee-Pichot; Valerie Barlois	Italy; Laura Chiesa; Elisa Uga; Margherita Zalaffi	Russia; Maria Mazina; Yuliya Garayeva; Karina Aznavourian
Men's individual foil	Alessandro Puccini; Italy	Lionel Plumenail; France	Franck Boidin; France
Women's individual foil	Laura Badea; Romania	Valentina Vezzali; Italy	Giovanna Trillini; Italy
Men's team foil	Russia; Dmitriy Shevchenko; Ilgar Mamedov; Vladislav Pavlovich	Poland; Piotr Kiełpikowski; Adam Krzesiński; Ryszard Sobczak; Jarosław Rodzewicz	Cuba; Elvis Gregory; Rolando Leon; Oscar García Perez
Women's team foil	Italy; Francesca Bortolozzi-Borella; Giovanna Trillini; Valentina Vezzali	Romania; Laura Badea; Reka Szabo; Roxana Scarlat	Germany; Anja Fichtel Mauritz; Sabine Bau; Monika Weber-Koszto
Men's individual sabre	Stanislav Pozdnyakov; Russia	Sergey Sharikov; Russia	Damien Touya; France
Men's team sabre	Russia; Stanislav Pozdnyakov; Grigoriy Kirienko; Sergey Sharikov	Hungary; Csaba Köves; József Navarrete; Bence Szabó	Italy; Raffaello Caserta; Luigi Tarantino; Toni Terenzi

== Field hockey ==
Event	Gold	Silver	Bronze
Men's	Netherlands; Jacques Brinkman; Floris Jan Bovelander; Maurits Crucq; Marc Delissen; Jeroen Delmee; Taco van den Honert; Erik Jazet; Ronald Jansen; Leo Klein Gebbink; Bram Lomans; Teun de Nooijer; Wouter van Pelt; Stephan Veen; Guus Vogels; Tycho van Meer; Remco van Wijk	Spain; Jaime Amat; Pablo Amat; Javier Arnau; Jordi Arnau; Óscar Barrena; Ignacio Cobos; Juan Dinarés; Juan Escarré; Xavier Escudé; Juantxo García-Mauriño; Antonio González; Ramón Jufresa; Joaquín Malgosa; Víctor Pujol; Ramón Sala; Pablo Usoz	Australia; Mark Hager; Stephen Davies; Baeden Choppy; Lachlan Elmer; Stuart Carruthers; Grant Smith; Damon Diletti; Lachlan Dreher, Brendan Garard; Paul Gaudoin; Paul Lewis; Matthew Smith; Jay Stacy; Daniel Sproule; Ken Wark; Michael York
Women's	Australia; Michelle Andrews; Alyson Annan; Louise Dobson; Renita Farrell; Juliet Haslam; Rechelle Hawkes; Clover Maitland; Karen Marsden; Jenn Morris; Nova Peris-Kneebone; Jackie Pereira; Katrina Powell; Lisa Powell; Danni Roche; Kate Starre; Liane Tooth	South Korea; You Jae-sook; Lim Jeong-sook; Oh Seung-shin; Woo Hyun-jung; Lee Eun-young; Lee Eun-kyung; Lee Ji-young; Kim Myung-ok; Kwon Chang-sook; Kwon Soo-hyun; Choi Mi-soon; Jeon Young-sun; Jin Deok-san; Chang Eun-jung; Cho Eun-jung; Choi Eun-kyung	Netherlands; Suzanne Plesman; Dillianne van den Boogaard; Florentine Steenberghe; Willemijn Duyster; Mijntje Donners; Fleur van de Kieft; Nicole Koolen; Jeannette Lewin; Wietske de Ruiter; Ellen Kuipers; Margje Teeuwen; Carole Thate; Jacqueline Toxopeus; Stella de Heij; Noor Holsboer; Suzan van der Wielen

== Football ==
Event	Gold	Silver	Bronze
Men's	Nigeria; Daniel Amokachi; Emmanuel Amuneke; Tijani Babangida; Celestine Babayaro; Emmanuel Babayaro; Teslim Fatusi; Victor Ikpeba; Dosu Joseph; Nwankwo Kanu; Garba Lawal; Abiodun Obafemi; Kingsley Obiekwu; Uche Okechukwu; Jay-Jay Okocha; Sunday Oliseh; Mobi Oparaku; Wilson Oruma; Taribo West	Argentina; Matías Almeyda; Roberto Ayala; Christian Bassedas; Carlos Bossio; Pablo Cavallero; José Chamot; Hernán Crespo Marcelo Delgado; Marcelo Gallardo; Claudio López; Gustavo López; Hugo Morales; Ariel Ortega; Pablo Paz; Héctor Pineda; Roberto Sensini; Diego Simeone; Javier Zanetti	Brazil; Dida; Zé María; Aldair; Ronaldo Guiaro; Flávio Conceição; Roberto Carlos; Bebeto; Amaral; Ronaldo; Rivaldo; Sávio; Danrlei; Narciso; André Luiz; Zé Elias; Marcelinho; Luizão; Juninho
Women's	United States; Michelle Akers; Brandi Chastain; Joy Fawcett; Julie Foudy; Carin Gabarra; Mia Hamm; Mary Harvey; Kristine Lilly; Shannon MacMillan; Tiffeny Milbrett; Carla Overbeck; Cindy Parlow; Tiffany Roberts; Briana Scurry; Tisha Venturini; Staci Wilson	China; Chen Yufeng; Fan Yunjie; Gao Hong; Liu Ailing; Liu Ying; Shi Guihong; Shui Qingxia; Sun Qingmei; Sun Wen; Wang Liping; Wei Haiying; Wen Lirong; Xie Huilin; Yu Hongqi; Zhao Lihong; Zhong Honglian	Norway; Ann Kristin Aarønes; Agnete Carlsen; Gro Espeseth; Tone Gunn Frustøl; Tone Haugen; Linda Medalen; Merete Myklebust; Bente Nordby; Anne Nymark Andersen; Nina Nymark Andersen; Marianne Pettersen; Hege Riise; Brit Sandaune; Reidun Seth; Heidi Støre; Tina Svensson; Trine Tangeraas; Kjersti Thun; Ingrid Sternhoff

== Gymnastics ==
=== Artistic ===
Event	Gold	Silver	Bronze
Men's floor	Ioannis Melissanidis; Greece	Li Xiaoshuang; China	Alexei Nemov; Russia
Women's floor	Lilia Podkopayeva; Ukraine	Simona Amânar; Romania	Dominique Dawes; United States
Men's vault	Alexei Nemov; Russia	Yeo Hong-Chul; South Korea	Vitaly Scherbo; Belarus
Women's vault	Simona Amânar; Romania	Mo Huilan; China	Gina Gogean; Romania
Men's parallel bars	Rustam Sharipov; Ukraine	Jair Lynch; United States	Vitaly Scherbo; Belarus
Women's uneven bars	Svetlana Khorkina; Russia	Bi Wenjing; China	none awarded
Women's uneven bars	Svetlana Khorkina; Russia	Amy Chow; United States	none awarded
Men's horizontal bar	Andreas Wecker; Germany	Krasimir Dunev; Bulgaria	Vitaly Scherbo; Belarus
Men's horizontal bar	Andreas Wecker; Germany	Krasimir Dunev; Bulgaria	Fan Bin; China
Men's horizontal bar	Andreas Wecker; Germany	Krasimir Dunev; Bulgaria	Alexei Nemov; Russia
Women's balance beam	Shannon Miller; United States	Lilia Podkopayeva; Ukraine	Gina Gogean; Romania
Men's pommel horse	Li Donghua; Switzerland	Marius Urzică; Romania	Alexei Nemov; Russia
Men's rings	Jury Chechi; Italy	Szilveszter Csollány; Hungary	none awarded
Men's rings	Jury Chechi; Italy	Dan Burincă; Romania	none awarded
Men's individual all-around	Li Xiaoshuang; China	Alexei Nemov; Russia	Vitaly Scherbo; Belarus
Women's individual all-around	Lilia Podkopayeva; Ukraine	Gina Gogean; Romania	Simona Amânar; Romania
Women's individual all-around	Lilia Podkopayeva; Ukraine	Gina Gogean; Romania	Lavinia Miloşovici; Romania
Men's team all-around	Russia; Sergei Kharkov; Nikolai Kryukov; Alexei Nemov; Yevgeni Podgorny; Dmitri Trush; Dmitri Vasilenko; Alexei Voropaev	China; Fan Bin; Fan Hongbin; Huang Huadong; Huang Liping; Li Xiaoshuang; Shen Jian; Zhang Jinjing	Ukraine; Igor Korobchinski; Oleg Kosiak; Grigory Misutin; Vladimir Shamenko; Rustam Sharipov; Olexander Svitlichni; Yuri Yermakov
Women's team all-around	United States; Amanda Borden; Amy Chow; Dominique Dawes; Shannon Miller; Dominique Moceanu; Jaycie Phelps; Kerri Strug	Russia; Elena Dolgopolova; Rozalia Galiyeva; Elena Grosheva; Svetlana Khorkina; Dina Kotchetkova; Yevgeniya Kuznetsova; Oksana Liapina	Romania; Simona Amânar; Gina Gogean; Ionela Loaieş; Alexandra Marinescu; Lavinia Miloşovici; Mirela Ţugurlan

=== Rhythmic ===
Event	Gold	Silver	Bronze
Group all-around	Spain; Estela Giménez Cid; Marta Baldó Marín; Nuria Cabanillas Provencio; Lorena Guréndez García; Estíbaliz Martínez Yerro; Tania Lamarca Celada	Bulgaria; Ina Deltcheva; Valentina Kevlian; Maria Koleva; Maja Tabakova; Ivelina Taleva; Vjara Vatachka	Russia; Yevgeniya Bochkaryova; Irina Dzyuba; Yuliya Ivanova; Yelena Krivoshey; Olga Shtyrenko; Angelina Yushkova
Individual all-around	Ekaterina Serebrianskaya; Ukraine	Yanina Batyrchina; Russia	Elena Vitrichenko; Ukraine

== Handball ==
Event	Gold	Silver	Bronze
Men	Croatia; Patrik Ćavar; Valner Franković; Slavko Goluža; Bruno Gudelj; Vladimir Jelčić; Božidar Jović; Nenad Kljaić; Venio Losert; Valter Matošević; Zoran Mikulić; Alvaro Načinović; Goran Perkovac; Iztok Puc; Zlatko Saračević; Irfan Smajlagić; Vladimir Šuster	Sweden; Magnus Andersson; Robert Andersson; Per Carlén; Martin Frändesjö; Erik Hajas; Robert Hedin; Andreas Larsson; Ola Lindgren; Stefan Lövgren; Mats Olsson; Staffan Olsson; Johan Petersson; Tomas Svensson; Tomas Sivertsson; Pierre Thorsson; Magnus Wislander	Spain; Talant Duyshebaev; Salvador Esquer; Aitor Etxaburu; Jesús Fernández; Jaume Fort; Mateo Garralda; Raúl González; Rafael Guijosa; Fernando Hernández; José Javier Hombrados; Demetrio Lozano; Jordi Nuñez; Jesús Olalla; Juan Pérez; Iñaki Urdangarín; Alberto Urdiales
Women	Denmark; Anja Andersen; Camilla Andersen; Kristine Andersen; Heidi Astrup; Tina Bøttzau; Marianne Florman; Conny Hamann; Anja Hansen; Anette Hoffmann; Tonje Kjærgaard; Janne Kolling; Susanne Lauritsen; Gitte Madsen; Lene Rantala; Gitte Sunesen; Anne Dorthe Tanderup	South Korea; Cho Eun-Hee; Han Sun-Hee; Hong Jeong-ho; Huh Soon-Young; Kim Cheong-Sim; Kim Eun-Mi; Kim Jeong-Mi; Kim Mi-Sim; Kim Rang; Kwag Hye-Jeong; Lee Sang-Eun; Lim O-Kyeong; Moon Hyang-Ja; Oh Sung-Ok; Oh Yong-Ran; Park Jeong-Lim	Hungary; Éva Erdős; Andrea Farkas; Beáta Hoffmann; Anikó Kántor; Erzsébet Kocsis; Beatrix Kökény; Eszter Mátéfi; Auguszta Mátyás; Anikó Meksz; Anikó Nagy; Helga Németh; Ildikó Pádár; Beáta Siti; Anna Szántó; Katalin Szilágyi; Beatrix Tóth

== Judo ==
Event	Gold	Silver	Bronze
Men's Extra lightweight (−60 kg)	Tadahiro Nomura; Japan	Girolamo Giovinazzo; Italy	Richard Trautmann; Germany Dorjpalamyn Narmandakh; Mongolia
Women's Extra lightweight (−48 kg)	Kye Sun-Hi; North Korea	Ryoko Tamura; Japan	Yolanda Soler; Spain Amarilis Savon; Cuba
Men's Half lightweight (−65 kg)	Udo Quellmalz; Germany	Yukimasa Nakamura; Japan	Israel Hernández; Cuba Henrique Guimarães; Brazil
Women's Half lightweight (−52 kg)	Marie-Claire Restoux; France	Hyun Sook-Hee; South Korea	Noriko Sugawara; Japan Legna Verdecia; Cuba
Men's Lightweight (−71 kg)	Kenzo Nakamura; Japan	Kwak Dae-Sung; South Korea	Christophe Gagliano; France Jimmy Pedro; United States
Women's Lightweight (−56 kg)	Driulis González; Cuba	Jung Sun-Yong; South Korea	Isabel Fernández; Spain Marisbel Lomba; Belgium
Men's Half middleweight (−78 kg)	Djamel Bouras; France	Toshihiko Koga; Japan	Soso Liparteliani; Georgia Cho In-Chul; South Korea
Women's Half middleweight (−61 kg)	Yuko Emoto; Japan	Gella Vandecaveye; Belgium	Jenny Gal; Netherlands Jung Sung-Sook; South Korea
Men's Middleweight (−86 kg)	Jeon Ki-Young; South Korea	Armen Bagdasarov; Uzbekistan	Marko Spittka; Germany Mark Huizinga; Netherlands
Women's Middleweight (−66 kg)	Cho Min-Sun; South Korea	Aneta Szczepańska; Poland	Wang Xianbo; China Claudia Zwiers; Netherlands
Men's Half heavyweight (−95 kg)	Paweł Nastula; Poland	Min Soo Kim; South Korea	Stéphane Traineau; France Aurélio Miguel; Brazil
Women's Half heavyweight (−72 kg)	Ulla Werbrouck; Belgium	Yoko Tanabe; Japan	Ylenia Scapin; Italy Diadenis Luna; Cuba
Men's Heavyweight (+95 kg)	David Douillet; France	Ernesto Pérez; Spain	Frank Möller; Germany Harry Van Barneveld; Belgium
Women's Heavyweight (+72 kg)	Sun Fuming; China	Estela Rodríguez; Cuba	Johanna Hagn; Germany Christine Cicot; France

== Modern pentathlon ==
Event	Gold	Silver	Bronze
Men's individual	Alexander Parygin; Kazakhstan	Eduard Zenovka; Russia	János Martinek; Hungary

== Rowing ==
Event	Gold	Silver	Bronze
Men's single sculls	Xeno Müller (SUI)	Derek Porter (CAN)	Thomas Lange (GER)
Women's single sculls	Ekaterina Karsten (BLR)	Silken Laumann (CAN)	Trine Hansen (DEN)
Men's double sculls	Italy; Agostino Abbagnale; Davide Tizzano	Norway; Steffen Størseth; Kjetil Undset	France; Frédéric Kowal; Samuel Barathay
Women's double sculls	Canada; Kathleen Heddle; Marnie McBean	China; Xiuyun Zhang; Cao Mianying	Netherlands; Irene Eijs; Eeke van Nes
Men's lightweight double sculls	Switzerland; Michael Gier; Markus Gier	Netherlands; Maarten van der Linden; Pepijn Aardewijn	Australia; Bruce Hick; Anthony Edwards
Women's lightweight double sculls	Romania; Camelia Macoviciuc; Constanța Burcică	United States; Teresa Bell; Lindsay Burns	Australia; Virginia Lee; Rebecca Joyce
Men's quadruple sculls	Germany; Andreas Hajek; Stephan Volkert; André Steiner; André Willms	United States; Tim Young; Eric Mueller; Brian Jamieson; Jason Gailes	Australia; Janusz Hooker; Bo Hanson; Duncan Free; Ronald Snook
Women's quadruple sculls	Germany; Katrin Rutschow-Stomporowski; Jana Sorgers; Kerstin Köppen; Kathrin Boron	Ukraine; Svitlana Maziy; Dina Miftakhutdynova; Inna Frolova; Olena Ronzhyna	Canada; Laryssa Biesenthal; Diane O'Grady; Kathleen Heddle; Marnie McBean
Men's coxless pair	Great Britain; Steve Redgrave; Matthew Pinsent	Australia; David Weightman; Rob Scott	France; Michel Andrieux; Jean Christophe Rolland
Women's coxless pair	Australia; Megan Leanne Still; Kate Elizabeth Slatter	United States; Missy Schwen; Karen Kraft	France; Christine Gossé; Hélène Cortin
Men's coxless four	Australia; Nicholas Green; Drew Ginn; James Tomkins; Mike McKay	France; Bertrand Vecten; Olivier Moncelet; Daniel Fauché; Gilles Bosquet	Great Britain; Gregory Searle; Jonathan William Searle; Rupert John Obholzer; Tim James Foster
Men's lightweight coxless four	Denmark; Victor Feddersen; Niels Henriksen; Thomas Poulsen; Eskild Ebbesen	Canada; Brian Peaker; Jeffrey Lay; Dave Boyes; Gavin Hassett	United States; Marc Schneider; Jeff Pfaendtner; David Collins; William Carlucci
Men's eight	Netherlands; Koos Maasdijk; Ronald Florijn; Jeroen Duyster; Michiel Bartman; Henk-Jan Zwolle; Niels van der Zwan; Niels van Steenis; Diederik Simon; Nico Rienks	Germany; Mark Kleinschmidt; Detlef Kirchhoff; Wolfram Huhn; Roland Baar; Marc Weber; Ulrich Viefers; Peter Thiede; Thorsten Streppelhoff; Frank Joerg Richter	Russia; Pavel Melnikov; Andrey Glukhov; Anton Chermashentsev; Aleksandr Lukyanov; Nikolay Aksyonov; Dmitry Rozinkevich; Sergey Matveyev; Roman Monchenko; Vladimir Volodenkov; Vladimir Sokolov
Women's eight	Romania; Liliana Gafencu; Veronica Cochela; Elena Georgescu; Anca Tănase; Doina Spîrcu; Marioara Popescu; Ioana Olteanu; Elisabeta Lipă; Doina Ignat	Canada; Anna van der Kamp; Tosha Tsang; Lesley Thompson; Emma Robinson; Jessica Monroe; Heather McDermid; Maria Maunder; Theresa Luke; Alison Korn	Belarus; Yelena Mikulich; Marina Znak; Nataliya Volchek; Nataliya Stasyuk; Tamara Davydenko; Valentina Skrabatun; Nataliya Lavrinenko; Yaroslava Pavlovich; Aleksandra Pankina

== Sailing ==
Event	Gold	Silver	Bronze
Men's sailboard	Greece; Nikolaos Kaklamanakis	Argentina; Carlos Mauricio Espinola	Israel; Gal Fridman
Women's sailboard	Hong Kong; Lai Shan Lee	New Zealand; Barbara Kendall	Italy; Alessandra Sensini
Men's Finn class	Poland; Mateusz Kusznierewicz	Belgium; Sebastien Godefroid	Netherlands; Roy Heiner
Women's Europe class	Denmark; Kristine Roug	Netherlands; Margriet Matthijsse	United States; Courtenay Becker-Dey
Men's 470 class	Ukraine; Yevhen Braslavets; Ihor Matviyenko	Great Britain; John Merricks; Ian Walker	Portugal; Hugo Rocha; Nuno Barreto
Women's 470 class	Spain; Theresa Zabell; Begoña Vía-Dufresne	Japan; Yumiko Shige; Alicia Kinoshita	Ukraine; Ruslana Taran; Olena Pakholchik
Open Laser class	Brazil; Robert Scheidt	Great Britain; Ben Ainslie	Norway; Peer Moberg
Open Star class	Brazil; Torben Grael; Marcelo Ferreira	Sweden; Hans Wallén; Bobby Lohse	Australia; Colin Beashel; David Giles
Open Soling class	Germany; Jochen Schümann; Thomas Flach; Bernd Jäkel	Russia; Georgy Shayduko; Dmitri Shabanov; Igor Skalin	United States; Jeff Madrigali; Jim Barton; Kent Massey
Open Tornado class	Spain; Fernando Leon; José Luis Ballester	Australia; Mitch Booth; Andrew Landenberger	Brazil; Lars Grael; Henrique Pellicano

== Shooting ==
Event	Gold	Silver	Bronze
Men's 10 metre air rifle	Artem Khadjibekov; Russia	Wolfram Waibel; Austria	Jean-Pierre Amat; France
Women's 10 metre air rifle	Renata Mauer; Poland	Petra Horneber; Germany	Aleksandra Ivošev; FR Yugoslavia
Men's 50 metre rifle prone	Christian Klees; Germany	Sergey Belyayev; Kazakhstan	Jozef Gönci; Slovakia
Men's 50 metre rifle three positions	Jean-Pierre Amat; France	Sergey Belyayev; Kazakhstan	Wolfram Waibel; Austria
Women's 50 metre rifle three positions	Aleksandra Ivošev; FR Yugoslavia	Irina Gerasimenok; Russia	Renata Mauer; Poland
Men's 10 metre air pistol	Roberto Di Donna; Italy	Wang Yifu; China	Tanyu Kiryakov; Bulgaria
Women's 10 metre air pistol	Olga Klochneva; Russia	Marina Logvinenko; Russia	Mariya Grozdeva; Bulgaria
Women's 25 metre pistol	Li Duihong; China	Diana Iorgova; Bulgaria	Marina Logvinenko; Russia
Men's 50 metre pistol	Boris Kokorev; Russia	Igor Basinski; Belarus	Roberto Di Donna; Italy
Men's 25 metre rapid fire pistol	Ralf Schumann; Germany	Emil Milev; Bulgaria	Vladimir Vokhmyanin; Kazakhstan
Men's trap	Michael Diamond; Australia	Josh Lakatos; United States	Lance Bade; United States
Men's double trap	Russell Mark; Australia	Albano Pera; Italy	Zhang Bing; China
Women's double trap	Kim Rhode; United States	Susanne Kiermayer; Germany	Deserie Huddleston; Australia
Men's skeet	Ennio Falco; Italy	Mirosław Rzepkowski; Poland	Andrea Benelli; Italy
Men's 10 metre running target	Yang Ling; China	Xiao Jun; China	Miroslav Januš; Czech Republic

== Softball ==
Event	Gold	Silver	Bronze
Women's	United States; Laura Berg; Gillian Boxx; Sheila Cornell; Lisa Fernandez; Michele Granger; Lori Harrigan; Dionna Harris; Kim Maher; Leah O'Brien; Dot Richardson; Julie Smith; Michele Smith; Shelly Stokes; Danielle Tyler; Christa Lee Williams	China; An Zhongxin; Chen Hong; He Liping; Lei Li; Liu Xuqing; Liu Yaju; Ma Ying; Ou Jingbai; Tao Hua; Wang Lihong; Wang Ying; Wei Qiang; Xu Jian; Yan Fang; Zhang Chunfang	Australia; Joanne Brown; Kim Cooper; Carolyn Crudgington; Kerry Dienelt; Peta Edebone; Tanya Harding; Jennifer Holliday; Joyce Lester; Sally McDermid; Francine McRae; Haylea Petrie; Nicole Richardson; Melanie Roche; Natalie Ward; Brooke Wilkins

== Table tennis ==
Event	Gold	Silver	Bronze
Men's singles	Liu Guoliang; China	Wang Tao; China	Jörg Roßkopf; Germany
Men's doubles	China; Liu Guoliang; Kong Linghui	China; Lü Lin; Wang Tao	South Korea; Lee Chul-Seung; Yoo Nam-Kyu
Women's singles	Deng Yaping; China	Chen Jing; Chinese Taipei	Qiao Hong; China
Women's doubles	China; Deng Yaping; Qiao Hong	China; Liu Wei; Qiao Yunping	South Korea; Park Hae-Jung; Ryu Ji-Hae

== Tennis ==
Event	Gold	Silver	Bronze
Men's singles	Andre Agassi; United States	Sergi Bruguera; Spain	Leander Paes; India
Women's singles	Lindsay Davenport; United States	Arantxa Sánchez Vicario; Spain	Jana Novotná; Czech Republic
Men's doubles	Australia; Todd Woodbridge; Mark Woodforde	Great Britain; Neil Broad; Tim Henman	Germany; Marc-Kevin Goellner; David Prinosil
Women's doubles	United States; Gigi Fernández; Mary Joe Fernández	Czech Republic; Jana Novotná; Helena Suková	Spain; Conchita Martínez; Arantxa Sánchez Vicario

== Volleyball ==
=== Beach ===
Event	Gold	Silver	Bronze
Men's team	Charles "Karch" Kiraly and Kent Steffes (USA)	Michael Dodd and Mike Whitmarsh (USA)	John Child and Mark Heese (CAN)
Women's team	Jackie Silva and Sandra Pires (BRA)	Mônica Rodrigues and Adriana Samuel (BRA)	Natalie Cook and Kerri Pottharst (AUS)

=== Indoor ===
Event	Gold	Silver	Bronze
Men's team	Netherlands; Peter Blangé; Guido Görtzen; Rob Grabert; Henk-Jan Held; Misha Latuhihin; Jan Posthuma; Brecht Rodenburg; Richard Schuil; Bas van de Goor; Mike van de Goor; Olof van der Meulen; Ron Zwerver	Italy; Lorenzo Bernardi; Vigor Bovolenta; Marco Bracci; Luca Cantagalli; Andrea Gardini; Andrea Giani; Pasquale Gravina; Marco Meoni; Samuele Papi; Andrea Sartoretti; Paolo Tofoli; Andrea Zorzi	FR Yugoslavia; Vladimir Batez; Dejan Brđović; Đorđe Đurić; Andrija Gerić; Nikola Grbić; Vladimir Grbić; Rajko Jokanović; Slobodan Kovač; Đula Mešter; Žarko Petrović; Željko Tanasković; Goran Vujević
Women's team	Cuba; Taimaris Aguero; Regla Bell; Magaly Carvajal; Marlenis Costa; Ana Fernández; Mirka Francia; Idalmis Gato; Lilia Izquierdo; Mireya Luis; Raisa O'Farrill; Yumilka Ruíz; Regla Torres	China; Cui Yong-Mei; He Qi; Lai Yawen; Li Yan; Liu Xiaoning; Pan Wenli; Sun Yue; Wang Lina; Wang Yi; Wang Ziling; Wu Yongmei; Zhu Yunying	Brazil; Ana Ida Alvares; Leila Barros; Filo Bodziak; Hilma Caldeira; Ana Connelly; Marcia Cunha; Virna Dias; Ana Moser; Ana Sanglard; Hélia Souza; Sandra Suruagy; Fernanda Venturini

== Weightlifting ==
Event	Gold	Silver	Bronze
Flyweight (−54 kg)	Halil Mutlu; Turkey	Zhang Xiangsen; China	Sevdalin Minchev; Bulgaria
Bantamweight (−59 kg)	Tang Lingsheng; China	Leonidas Sampanis; Greece	Nikolay Peshalov; Bulgaria
Featherweight (−64 kg)	Naim Süleymanoğlu; Turkey	Valerios Leonidis; Greece	Xiao Jiangang; China
Lightweight (−70 kg)	Zhan Xugang; China	Kim Myong-Nam; North Korea	Attila Feri; Hungary
Middleweight (−76 kg)	Pablo Lara Rodriguez; Cuba	Yoto Yotov; Bulgaria	Jon Chol-Ho; North Korea
Light Heavyweight (−83 kg)	Pyrros Dimas; Greece	Marc Huster; Germany	Andrzej Cofalik; Poland
Middle Heavyweight (−91 kg)	Aleksei Petrov; Russia	Leonidas Kokas; Greece	Oliver Caruso; Germany
Heavyweight I (−99 kg)	Kakhi Kakhiashvili; Greece	Anatoli Khrapaty; Kazakhstan	Denys Gotfrid; Ukraine
Heavyweight II (−108 kg)	Timour Taimazov; Ukraine	Serguei Syrtsov; Russia	Nicu Vlad; Romania
Super Heavyweight (+108 kg)	Andrei Chemerkin; Russia	Ronny Weller; Germany	Stefan Botev; Australia

== Wrestling ==
=== Freestyle ===
Event	Gold	Silver	Bronze
Light flyweight (−48 kg)	Kim Il; North Korea	Armen Mkrtchyan; Armenia	Alexis Vila; Cuba
Flyweight (−52 kg)	Valentin Yordanov; Bulgaria	Namig Abdullayev; Azerbaijan	Maulen Mamyrov; Kazakhstan
Bantamweight (−57 kg)	Kendall Cross; United States	Guivi Sissaouri; Canada	Ri Yong-Sam; North Korea
Featherweight (−62 kg)	Tom Brands; United States	Jang Jae-Sung; South Korea	Elbrus Tedeyev; Ukraine
Lightweight (−68 kg)	Vadim Bogiyev; Russia	Townsend Saunders; United States	Zaza Zazirov; Ukraine
Welterweight (−74 kg)	Buvaisar Saitiev; Russia	Park Jang-Soon; South Korea	Takuya Ota; Japan
Middleweight (−82 kg)	Khadzhimurad Magomedov; Russia	Yang Hyun-Mo; South Korea	Amir Reza Khadem; Iran
Light Heavyweight (−90 kg)	Rasoul Khadem; Iran	Makharbek Khadartsev; Russia	Eldar Kurtanidze; Georgia
Heavyweight (−100 kg)	Kurt Angle; United States	Abbas Jadidi; Iran	Arawat Sabejew; Germany
Super Heavyweight (−130 kg)	Mahmut Demir; Turkey	Aleksei Medvedev; Belarus	Bruce Baumgartner; United States

=== Greco-Roman ===
Event	Gold	Silver	Bronze
light flyweight (−48 kg)	Sim Kwon-Ho; South Korea	Aleksandr Pavlov; Belarus	Zafar Guliyev; Russia
flyweight (−52 kg)	Armen Nazaryan; Armenia	Brandon Paulson; United States	Andriy Kalashnikov; Ukraine
bantamweight (−57 kg)	Yuriy Melnichenko; Kazakhstan	Dennis Hall; United States	Sheng Zetian; China
featherweight (−62 kg)	Włodzimierz Zawadzki; Poland	Juan Marén; Cuba	Mehmet Akif Pirim; Turkey
lightweight (−68 kg)	Ryszard Wolny; Poland	Ghani Yalouz; France	Aleksandr Tretyakov; Russia
welterweight (−74 kg)	Filiberto Azcuy; Cuba	Marko Asell; Finland	Józef Tracz; Poland
middleweight (−82 kg)	Hamza Yerlikaya; Turkey	Thomas Zander; Germany	Valeriy Tsilent; Belarus
light heavyweight (−90 kg)	Vyacheslav Oliynyk; Ukraine	Jacek Fafiński; Poland	Maik Bullmann; Germany
heavyweight (−100 kg)	Andrzej Wroński; Poland	Sergey Lishtvan; Belarus	Mikael Ljungberg; Sweden
super heavyweight (−130 kg)	Aleksandr Karelin; Russia	Matt Ghaffari; United States	Sergei Mureiko; Moldova

== Leading medal winners ==
23 competitors won at least three medals.

Athlete	Nation	Sport	Gold	Silver	Bronze	Total
Alexei Nemov	Russia	Gymnastics	2	1	3	6
Amy Van Dyken	United States	Swimming	4	0	0	4
Michelle Smith	Ireland	Swimming	3	0	1	4
Alexander Popov	Russia	Swimming	2	2	0	4
Gary Hall Jr.	United States	Swimming	2	2	0	4
Angel Martino	United States	Swimming	2	0	2	4
Simona Amânar	Romania	Gymnastics	1	1	2	4
Dagmar Hase	Germany	Swimming	0	3	1	4
Gina Gogean	Romania	Gymnastics	0	1	3	4
Vitaly Scherbo	Belarus	Gymnastics	0	0	4	4
Jenny Thompson	United States	Swimming	3	0	0	3
Josh Davis	United States	Swimming	3	0	0	3
Lilia Podkopayeva	Ukraine	Gymnastics	2	1	0	3
Denis Pankratov	Russia	Swimming	2	1	0	3
Le Jingyi	China	Swimming	1	2	0	3
Li Xiaoshuang	China	Gymnastics	1	2	0	3
Amanda Beard	United States	Swimming	1	2	0	3
Whitney Hedgepeth	United States	Swimming	1	2	0	3
Susie O'Neill	Australia	Swimming	1	2	0	3
Franziska van Almsick	Germany	Swimming	1	0	2	3
Merlene Ottey-Page	Jamaica	Athletics	0	2	1	3
Daniel Kowalski	Austria	Swimming	0	1	2	3
Sandra Völker	Germany	Swimming	0	1	2	3

== See also ==
- 1996 Summer Olympics medal table
