= St Edmund's College Boat Club =

British rowing club

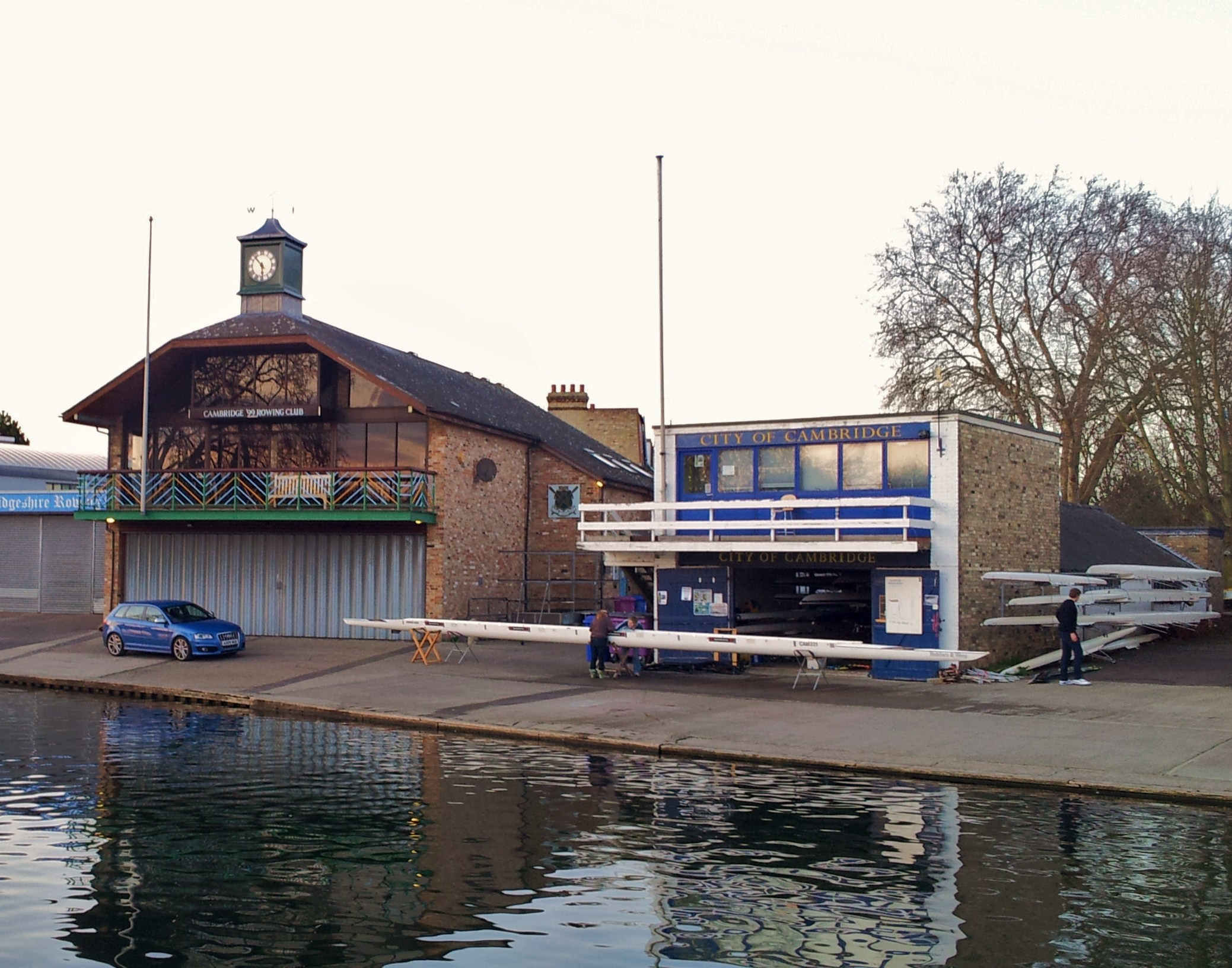

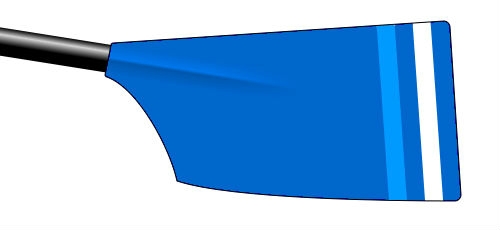
- Motto: Per Revelationem et Rationem
- Motto in English: Through Revelation and Reason
- Location: Cambridge, England
- Coordinates: 52°12′39.54″N 0°7′52.87″E
- Home water: River Cam
- Founded: 1969
- University: St Edmund's College, Cambridge
- Affiliations: British Rowing CUCBC
- Website: stedsboatclub.wordpress.com

St Edmund's College Boat Club (SECBC) is the boat club for members of St Edmund's College, Cambridge, England. St Edmund's College is a constituent college of the University of Cambridge in England. SECBC was founded in the 1969 and uses the Cambridge '99 RC boathouse for training and storing its boats.

== History ==
On 26 October 1969 a college alumni Bernard Buckley wrote to the David Cruttenden, the President of Cambridge University Boat Club and permission was granted to form a new boat club.

In recent years, the boat club's men's first boat (M1) has bumped in both Lent Bumps and May Bumps races.

Since 1993, the club has provided multiple rowers for The Boat Race, three rowers appeared in The Boat Race 1993 and many have rowed in the race since.

== Honours ==
=== Boat Race representatives ===
The following rowers were part of the rowing club at the time of their participation in The Boat Race.

Men's boat race

Year	Name
1993	Richard Phelps
1993	Jon A. Bernstein
1993	Malcolm Baker
1994	Richard Phelps
1994	Jon A. Bernstein
1994	Matthew Parish
1994	Thorsten Streppelhoff
1995	Richard Phelps
1995	Matthew Parish
1995	Scott Brownlee
1995	Marko Banović
1996	Ethan Ayer
1997	Ethan Ayer
1997	Alex Story
1998	Graham Smith
1998	Alex Story
1998	Marc Weber
1999	Graham Smith
2001	Lukas P. Hirst
2001	Rick Dunn
2001	Christian Cormack (cox)
2002	Sam Brooks
2002	Lukas P. Hirst
2002	Stuart Welch
2002	Rick Dunn
2004	Andrew Shannon
2004	Nate Kirk
2005	Luke Walton
2005	Henry Adams
2006	Luke Walton
2006	Thorsten Engelmann
2006	Kip McDaniel
2007	Kip McDaniel
2007	Dan O'Shaughnessy
2007	Peter Champion
2007	Thorsten Engelmann

Year	Name
2008	Henry Pelly
2009	Rob Weitemeyer
2009	Henry Pelly
2009	Ryan Monaghan
2009	Hardy Cubasch
2010	Rob Weitemeyer
2010	Geoff Roth
2010	Henry Pelly
2011	Hardy Cubasch
2011	Geoff Roth
2012	Alexander Scharp
2012	Steve Dudek
2013	Alexander Scharp
2013	Steve Dudek
2014	Luke Juckett
2014	Steve Dudek
2014	Matthew Jackson
2014	Joshua Hooper
2015	Luke Juckett
2015	Joshua Hooper
2015	Alexander Leichter
2015	Matthew Jackson
2016	Luke Juckett
2018	Rob Hurn
2021	Garth Holden
2022	Simon Schürch
2022	James Bernard
2025	Douwe de Graaf

Women's boat race

Year	Name
2023	Freya Keto
2025	Annie Wertheimer
