= Rowing at the 1996 Summer Olympics – Men's eight =

Men's eight at the Games of the XXVI Olympiad
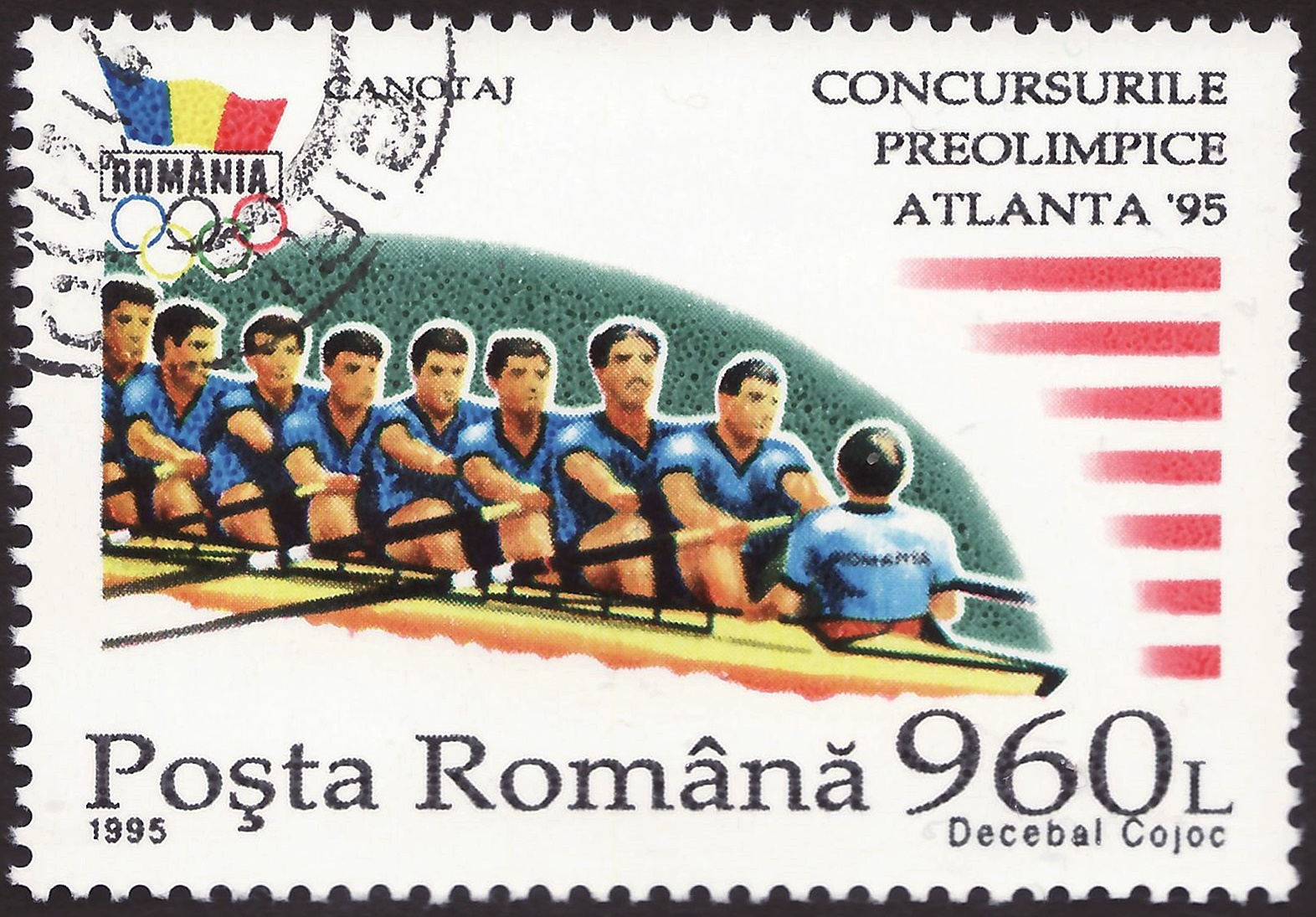
- Romania stamp depicting men's eight at the 1996 Olympics
- Venue: Lake Lanier
- Dates: 21–28 July 1996
- Competitors: 90 from 10 nations
- Winning time: 5:42.74

Medalists
1st place, gold medalist(s)		Netherlands: Koos Maasdijk; Ronald Florijn; Jeroen Duyster; Michiel Bartman; Henk-Jan Zwolle; Niels van der Zwan; Niels van Steenis; Diederik Simon; Nico Rienks
2nd place, silver medalist(s)		Germany: Mark Kleinschmidt; Detlef Kirchhoff; Wolfram Huhn; Roland Baar; Marc Weber; Ulrich Viefers; Peter Thiede; Thorsten Streppelhoff; Frank Richter
3rd place, bronze medalist(s)		Russia: Pavel Melnikov; Andrey Glukhov; Anton Chermashentsev; Aleksandr Lukyanov; Nikolay Aksyonov; Dmitry Rozinkevich; Sergey Matveyev; Roman Monchenko; Vladimir Volodenkov; Vladimir Sokolov

The men's eight competition at the 1996 Summer Olympics in Atlanta, Georgia took place at Lake Lanier. It was held from 21 to 27 July. There were 10 boats (90 competitors) from 10 nations, with each nation limited to a single boat in the event. The event was won by the Netherlands, the nation's first victory in the men's eight and first medal of any color in the event since 1900. Germany took silver; it was the 9th time in the past 10 Games that a German team (Germany, United Team of Germany, East Germany, or West Germany) was on the podium, with the only exception being 1984 when no German boats competed. Russia earned bronze in its independent debut.

== Background ==
This was the 22nd appearance of the event. Rowing had been on the programme in 1896 but was cancelled due to bad weather. The men's eight has been held every time that rowing has been contested, beginning in 1900.

Of the 10 nations competing, five had won medals in top-level competition in the last four years. Canada was the reigning Olympic champion, though it had not been on a World Championship podium since. Germany, the 1992 Olympic bronze winners, had taken gold at the 1993 and 1995 World Championships. The 1994 World Champion was the United States, which had also earned bronze in 1993 and 1995. Dutch crews had been runners-up in 1994 and 1995. Romania had taken silver at the 1992 Olympics and 1993 World Championship, as well as bronze in 1994.

Russia and Ukraine each made their debut in the event. The United States made its 19th appearance, most among nations to that point.

== Competition format ==
The "eight" event featured nine-person boats, with eight rowers and a coxswain. It was a sweep rowing event, with the rowers each having one oar (and thus each rowing on one side). The course used the 2000 metres distance that became the Olympic standard in 1912 (with the exception of 1948). Races were held in up to six lanes.

The competition consisted of two main rounds (semifinals and finals) as well as a repechage.

- Semifinals: Two heats of five boats each. The top boat in each heat (2 boats total) advanced directly to the "A" final, while all other boats (8 total) went to the repechage.
- Repechage: Two heats of four boats each. The top two boats in each heat (4 boats total) rejoined the semifinal winners in the "A" final, with the 3rd and 4th place boats in each heat (4 boats total) eliminated from medal contention and competing in the "B" final.
- Finals: The "A" final consisted of the top six boats, awarding medals and 4th through 6th place. The "B" final featured the next four boats, ranking them 7th through 10th.

== Schedule ==
All times are Eastern Daylight Time (UTC-4)

Date	Time	Round
Monday, 22 July 1996	11:50	Semifinals
Wednesday, 24 July 1996	11:20	Repechage
Sunday, 28 July 1996	9:42; 12:00	Final B Final A

== Results ==
=== Semifinals ===
==== Semifinal 1 ====
Rank	Rowers	Coxswain	Nation	Time	Notes
1	Koos Maasdijk; Ronald Florijn; Nico Rienks; Michiel Bartman; Henk-Jan Zwolle; Niels van der Zwan; Niels van Steenis; Diederik Simon	Jeroen Duyster	Netherlands	5:41.41	QA
2	Greg Stevenson; Phil Graham; Henry Hering; Mark Platt; Darren Barber; Andrew Crosby; Scott Brodie; Adam Parfitt	Pat Newman	Canada	5:44.00	R
3	James Stewart; Geoff Stewart; Rob Jahrling; Nick Porzig; Jaime Fernandez; Ben Dodwell; Robert Walker; Richard Wearne	Brett Hayman	Australia	5:46.83	R
4	Matthew Parish; Jim Walker; Alex Story; Richard Hamilton; Roger Brown; Peter Bridge; Ben Hunt-Davis; Graham Smith	Garry Herbert	Great Britain	5:49.37	R
5	Yevhen Sharonin; Roman Hrynevych; Vitaliy Raievskiy; Valeriy Samara; Oleh Lykov; Ihor Martynenko; Ihor Mohylniy; Oleksandr Kapustin	Hryhoriy Dmytrenko	Ukraine	5:55.32	R

==== Semifinal 2 ====
Rank	Rowers	Coxswain	Nation	Time	Notes
1	Doug Burden; Bob Kaehler; Porter Collins; Ted Murphy; Jamie Koven; Jon Brown; Don Smith; Fred Honebein	Steven Segaloff	United States	5:44.87	QA
2	Mark Kleinschmidt; Detlef Kirchhoff; Wolfram Huhn; Roland Baar; Marc Weber; Ulrich Viefers; Peter Thiede; Thorsten Streppelhoff	Frank Richter	Germany	5:46.04	R
3	Sergey Matveyev; Andrey Glukhov; Dmitry Rozinkevich; Vladimir Sokolov; Nikolay Aksyonov; Roman Monchenko; Pavel Melnikov; Anton Chermashentsev	Aleksandr Lukyanov	Russia	5:48.63	R
4	Gabriel Marin; Andrei Bănică; Cornel Nemțoc; Dorin Alupei; Viorel Talapan; Nicolae Țaga; Valentin Robu; Iulică Ruican	Marin Gheorghe	Romania	5:54.34	R
5	Carmine Abbagnale; Patrick Casanova; Francesco Mattei; Roberto Blanda; Lorenzo Carboncini; Mattia Trombetta; Roby La Mura; Franco Zucchi	Vincenzo Di Palma	Italy	5:54.59	R

=== Repechage ===
==== Repechage heat 1 ====
Rank	Rowers	Coxswain	Nation	Time	Notes
1	Greg Stevenson; Phil Graham; Henry Hering; Mark Platt; Darren Barber; Andrew Crosby; Scott Brodie; Adam Parfitt	Pat Newman	Canada	5:30.76	QA
2	Sergey Matveyev; Andrey Glukhov; Dmitry Rozinkevich; Anton Chermashentsev; Nikolay Aksyonov; Roman Monchenko; Pavel Melnikov; Vladimir Volodenkov	Aleksandr Lukyanov	Russia	5:32.98	QA
3	Matthew Parish; Jim Walker; Alex Story; Richard Hamilton; Roger Brown; Peter Bridge; Ben Hunt-Davis; Graham Smith	Garry Herbert	Great Britain	5:33.22	QB
4	Carmine Abbagnale; Patrick Casanova; Francesco Mattei; Roberto Blanda; Lorenzo Carboncini; Mattia Trombetta; Roby La Mura; Franco Zucchi	Vincenzo Di Palma	Italy	5:34.40	QB

==== Repechage heat 2 ====
Rank	Rowers	Coxswain	Nation	Time	Notes
1	Mark Kleinschmidt; Detlef Kirchhoff; Wolfram Huhn; Roland Baar; Marc Weber; Ulrich Viefers; Peter Thiede; Thorsten Streppelhoff	Frank Richter	Germany	5:30.61	QA
2	James Stewart; Geoff Stewart; Rob Jahrling; Nick Porzig; Jaime Fernandez; Ben Dodwell; Robert Walker; Richard Wearne	Brett Hayman	Australia	5:31.33	QA
3	Gabriel Marin; Andrei Bănică; Cornel Nemțoc; Dorin Alupei; Viorel Talapan; Nicolae Țaga; Valentin Robu; Iulică Ruican	Marin Gheorghe	Romania	5:31.88	QB
4	Yevhen Sharonin; Roman Hrynevych; Vitaliy Raievskiy; Valeriy Samara; Oleh Lykov; Ihor Martynenko; Ihor Mohylniy; Oleksandr Kapustin	Hryhoriy Dmytrenko	Ukraine	5:42.43	QB

=== Finals ===
==== Final B ====
Rank	Rowers	Coxswain	Nation	Time
7	Gabriel Marin; Andrei Bănică; Cornel Nemțoc; Dorin Alupei; Viorel Talapan; Nicolae Țaga; Valentin Robu; Iulică Ruican	Marin Gheorghe	Romania	5:37.65
8	Matthew Parish; Jim Walker; Alex Story; Richard Hamilton; Roger Brown; Peter Bridge; Ben Hunt-Davis; Graham Smith	Garry Herbert	Great Britain	5:40.23
9	Carmine Abbagnale; Patrick Casanova; Francesco Mattei; Roberto Blanda; Lorenzo Carboncini; Mattia Trombetta; Roby La Mura; Franco Zucchi	Vincenzo Di Palma	Italy	5:41.95
10	Yevhen Sharonin; Roman Hrynevych; Vitaliy Raievskiy; Valeriy Samara; Oleh Lykov; Ihor Martynenko; Ihor Mohylniy; Oleksandr Kapustin	Hryhoriy Dmytrenko	Ukraine	5:44.89

==== Final A ====
Rank	Rowers	Coxswain	Nation	Time
1st place, gold medalist(s)	Koos Maasdijk; Ronald Florijn; Nico Rienks; Michiel Bartman; Henk-Jan Zwolle; Niels van der Zwan; Niels van Steenis; Diederik Simon	Jeroen Duyster	Netherlands	5:42.74
2nd place, silver medalist(s)	Mark Kleinschmidt; Detlef Kirchhoff; Wolfram Huhn; Roland Baar; Marc Weber; Ulrich Viefers; Peter Thiede; Thorsten Streppelhoff	Frank Richter	Germany	5:44.58
3rd place, bronze medalist(s)	Anton Chermashentsev; Andrey Glukhov; Dmitry Rozinkevich; Vladimir Volodenkov; Nikolay Aksyonov; Roman Monchenko; Pavel Melnikov; Sergey Matveyev	Aleksandr Lukyanov	Russia	5:45.77
4	Greg Stevenson; Phil Graham; Henry Hering; Mark Platt; Darren Barber; Andrew Crosby; Scott Brodie; Adam Parfitt	Pat Newman	Canada	5:46.54
5	Doug Burden; Bob Kaehler; Porter Collins; Ted Murphy; Jamie Koven; Jon Brown; Don Smith; Fred Honebein	Steven Segaloff	United States	5:48.45
6	James Stewart; Geoff Stewart; Rob Jahrling; Nick Porzig; Jaime Fernandez; Ben Dodwell; Robert Walker; Richard Wearne	Brett Hayman	Australia	5:58.82

== Sources ==
- "Official Olympic Report". International Olympic Committee.
