= Duyster =

Duyster is a Dutch surname. Notable people with the surname include:

- Willemijn Duyster (born 1970), Dutch field hockey player
- Jeroen Duyster (born 1966), Dutch rower
- Willem Cornelisz Duyster (1599–1635), Dutch painter
