= Jaime Fernandez (rower) =

Australian rower

Medal record

Men's rowing

Representing Australia

Olympic Games
Silver medal – second place	2000 Sydney	Men's eight

Commonwealth Rowing Championships
Gold medal – first place	1994 Ontario	Coxed four

Jaime Francisco Fernandez (born 4 April 1971) is an Australian former rower. He was a national champion, a three-time Olympian and an Australian representative at five World Rowing Championships. He won a silver medal at the 2000 Sydney Olympics in the men's eight.

== Early life and studies ==
Fernandez was born in Melbourne. He grew up in the remote mining town of Gove, Northern Territory, but moved to Adelaide for high school, where he attended Christian Brothers College. His main sporting interest at the time was Australian Rules Football, but he was required to participate in a summer sport as well, and he selected rowing. Fernandez was quoted in the Yass Tribune: "At school, we had to play a summer sport. I had a mate who did a bit of rowing… so I thought 'ah well, I'll give it a go'."

He later studied science at the University of Adelaide. During this time, he was recruited to the Adelaide University Boat Club when one of the regular members fell ill. He quickly rediscovered his love for the sport, and by the age of 19 was rowing for Australia.

== State and club rowing ==
Fernandez made his first state crew for South Australia in the 1991 South Australian men's eight contesting the King's Cup at the Interstate Regatta within the Australian Rowing Championships. He raced again in South Australian King's Cup crews in 1992, 1993, 1994, 1995 and stroked those crews in 1992, 1993, 1994.

After accepting a scholarship to the Australian Institute of Sport and during his senior Australian representative years, Fernandez raced the King's Cup in Australian Capital Territory crews. He rowed in the five seat of the ACT eight in 1997 to a King's Cup victory and rowed in three more ACT eights in 1998, 1999 and 2000.

== International representative rowing ==
Fernandez' Australian representative debut came at the 1992 Barcelona Olympics when he was selected amongst a number of other new faces in the men's eight. They rowed to a fifth placing in the Olympic final.

In 1993 Fernandez rowed in the four seat of the men's eight who competed at the 1993 World Rowing Championships on Racize, Croatia and placed fourth. By this time he was in residence at the Australian Institute of Sport and training with the Australian heavyweight sweep-oared squad under head coach Reinhold Batschi. In 1994 Batschi selected Fernandez and Nick Porzig in an Australian coxed four with David Weightman, Shane McLaughlin and with Brett Hayman on the rudder. They placed fifth at the World Championships in Indianapolis. That four also contested and won gold at the 1994 Commonwealth Regatta in Ontario, Canada held alongside the 1994 Commonwealth Games.

In 1995 Fernandez was back in the Australian eight where he would stay for the rest of national representative career. At the 1995 World Rowing Championships in Tampere Finland and stroked by Rob Scott they finished overall eleventh. Fernandez, Porzig, Hayman, Rob Jahrling, and Ben Dodwell remained in the Australian eight into the 1996 Olympic year and were joined in the crew by the Stewart twins and the New South Wales pair of Walker and Wearne taking over in the stern end. At the 1996 Atlanta Olympics the Australian eight rowed to a sixth place.

Following a post-Olympic break Fernandez stepped back into the five seat of the eight for the 1998 World Rowing Championships in Cologne where they rowed to a sixth placing. In 1999 the crew raced at the World Rowing Cup III before contesting the 1999 World Rowing Championships in St Catharine's Canada where they missed the A final and finished in seventh place.

In 2000 the Australian eight qualified for the Olympics and raced at two Rowing World Cups in the lead up campaign as well as at the Henley Royal Regatta where they raced as an Australian Institute of Sport eight and won that year's Grand Challenge Cup. At Sydney 2000 with Fernandez at stroke, the Australian eight won their heat in a pace that blew away the eventual gold medallists Great Britain. However, in the final Great Britain returned the favour and blew the Australian eight away in the first 1500 metres and having started slowly their late sprint home left them 0.8 seconds behind the Brits at the line and to take the silver Olympic medal in a thrilling finish. Fernandez retired from rowing following the Sydney Olympics.

== Post competitive rowing ==
In 1999, Fernandez married Mary-Jane Harding of Yass, New South Wales. In 2014 he became Deputy National Performance Director at Rowing Australia.

in 2021, he was inducted into the ACT Sport Hall of Fame. In November 2023, he was inducted into the University of Canberra Sports Walk of Fame.
