= Pavel Melnikov =

Pavel Melnikov may refer to:

- Pavel Ivanovich Melnikov (1818-1883), Russian writer
- Pavel Petrovich Melnikov, Russian engineer
- Pavel Melnikov (rower), Russian Olympic rower
