= Lorenzo Moore (British Army officer) =

Major General Sir Lorenzo Moore KCH CB (c. 1765 – April 1837) was a British Army officer who served during the Napoleonic Wars. He also served for four years as Governor of the Greek island of Zante

== Biography ==
Moore was born in Dublin (or possibly at Tinraheen) to Lorenzo Moore, the son of John Moore and Maryann, daughter of Lorenzo Moore (born c. 1722 at Tinraheen).

Moore entered the Army as ensign in the 61st Regiment of Foot, and from thence until he ceased doing regimental duty — a period of 42 years — he never sought leave of absence from his corps, except when compelled by severe ill-health. Moore embarked no less than twelve different times on foreign service in various quarters of the globe — in the East Indies, Egypt, the Cape of Good Hope, the Mediterranean, and in the West Indies twice.

In the year 1798 (Note: The United Service Magazine records this as 1795, but this is probably a typographical error as the war with France did not start until 1798) Moore was severely wounded at the Capture of St. Lucia: and his constitution was so shaken at that early period of his life, by the combined effects of his wound and the West Indian climate, that he seldom ceased to feel the effects of them. Yet he never suffered himself to yield to the lassitude usually attendant on such occasions, but manfully struggling against it, and sustained by a strong sense of the soldier's duty, his military spirit carried him through all fatigues, and enabled him to acquire a character so high as to recommend him for quick promotion, and secure to him the approbation and confidence of three of England's most highly thought of Generals of the day, namely. Sir John Moore, on whose personal staff he served in Ireland in the year 1798; he was subsequently appointed to the staff of Sir Charles, afterwards Earl Grey; and lastly to that of Sir Hildebrand Oakes.

In the Mediterranean Moore commanded the only British regiment (the 35th) employed in the capture of the Ionian Islands; and so distinguished was his conduct in the progress of military operations there, that during the siege of the strong fortress of Saint Maure, he was thrice thanked in Public Orders—the last of these called forth by a brilliant achievement, deemed nearly impracticable at the time, whereby with a force scarcely one-third of that opposed to him, he carried by assault their last position in front, and within point-blank range of their fortress, and so strengthened it during the night, as to enable him effectually to resist the full fire of the batteries from daylight to midday, when the enemy were compelled to surrender.

Moore was subsequently appointed head of the provisional government and Commandant in the island of Zante, which he held for four years, and by his judicious and conciliating conduct so gained the esteem and regard of the inhabitants, as to call forth a flattering testimony of their feelings in requesting permission for the island to become sponsor to one of his children, born during his government there.

In the year 1834 Moore was honoured by William IV with the investiture of the Guelphic Order, as a Knight Commander, having previously been made a Companion of the Bath (CB).

== Family ==
Sir Lorenzo Moore married Eliza Sophia (c. 1779–1849), (Note: "Lady Moore died at Florence on 7 December 1849 aged 70 and was buried there on 10 December in the Protestant cemetery, her place of burial graced by a memorial designed by Francesco Mattei."—Twickenham Museum.Twickenham Museum) the eldest daughter of the Morley Wharrey, of Selby, Yorkshire, on 13 July 1808 at Barfreston. They had two sons and two daughters:

- Jacinthius Antonio (died 16 June 1816, at Leghorn (Livorno)) and was buried in the English Cemetery, Florence.
- John Hildebrand Oakes (c. 1812 – 18 September 1850 in Oakfields) became a Major in the 4th Foot
- Eliza Sophia Theresa Henrietta (before 1814 – 1846), married Samuel Lysons (1806–1877) on 12 May 1801. They had four sons and two sons and two daughters.
- Zacynthia (c. 1814–1907), on 3 July 1849 married Charles John Courtenay-Boyle. One of their daughters, Audrey Georgiana Florence, married Hallam Tennyson, son of Alfred Lord Tennyson.
