= Peter Bridge =

British rower

Personal information
- Nationality: British
- Born: 3 June 1972 (age 52); Pembury, England

Sport
- Sport: Rowing

Peter Bridge (born 3 June 1972) is a British rower. He competed in the men's eight event at the 1996 Summer Olympics.

After winning a World Junior gold medal in the coxless four. Bridge studied at Oriel College, Oxford. He competed in The Boat Race in 1991 for Oxford University and 1992 He went on to umpire the race in 2007, and from 2009 to 2018 was Chairman of Oxford University Boat Club and sat on the board of the Boat Race Company Limited.

In 2019, he joined the committee of the Leander Club and in June 2020 was appointed chairman of the club.
