= Patrick Casanova =

Italian rower

Personal information
- Nationality: Italian
- Born: 13 September 1976 (age 48); Rome, Italy

Sport
- Sport: Rowing

Patrick Casanova (born 13 September 1976) is an Italian former rower. He competed in the men's eight event at the 1996 Summer Olympics.
