= Tessa Appeldoorn =

Dutch rower (born 1973)

Personal information
- Born: 29 April 1973 (age 53) Utrecht
- Height: 177 cm (5 ft 10 in)
- Weight: 71 kg (157 lb)
- Spouse: Henk-Jan Zwolle

Sport
- Sport: Rowing
- Club: Viking, Utrecht
Medal record
Women's rowing
Representing the Netherlands
Olympic Games
| Silver medal – second place | 2000 Sydney | Eight |
World Rowing Championships
| Bronze medal – third place | 1995 Tampere | Eight |
| Bronze medal – third place | 1998 Cologne | Coxless four |

Tessa Appeldoorn (later Zwolle-Appeldoorn, born 29 April 1973) is a Dutch Olympic rower.

Appeldoorn was born in Utrecht in 1973. A silver medallist at the 2000 Summer Olympics in the Dutch women's eight, she was also in the women's eight in the 1996 Summer Olympics, finishing sixth. Appeldoorn also won World Championship bronze in the women's eight in 1995 and the women's coxless four in 1998.

She married fellow Dutch rower Henk-Jan Zwolle in October 1998.
