= Scott Brodie =

Canadian rower

Personal information
- Born: 13 July 1971 (age 54) St. Catharines, Ontario, Canada

Sport
- Sport: Rowing
Medal record
Representing Canada
Pan American Games
| Silver medal – second place | 1995 Mar del Plata | Coxed fours |
| Silver medal – second place | 1995 Mar del Plata | Eights |

Scott James Brodie (born 13 July 1971) is a Canadian rower. He competed in the men's eight event at the 1996 Summer Olympics.
