= Vincenzo Di Palma =

Italian rower

Personal information
- Born: 30 June 1970 (age 56)

Sport
- Sport: Rowing
Medal record
Men's rowing
Representing Italy
World Rowing Championships
Gold medal – first place	2002 Seville	Lwt eight
Bronze medal – third place	1995 Tampere	Coxed four
Bronze medal – third place	2010 Karapiro	Lwt eight

Vincenzo Di Palma (born 30 June 1970) is an Italian coxswain. He coxed the Italian men's eight at the 1996 Summer Olympics. He won a gold medal at the 2002 World Rowing Championships in Seville with the lightweight men's eight.
