= Matthew Parish (rower) =

British rower

Personal information
- Nationality: British
- Born: 30 November 1971 (age 54) London, England

Sport
- Sport: Rowing
Medal record
Representing Great Britain
Summer Universiade
Silver medal – second place	1993 Buffalo	Eights

Matthew Herbert Woodbine Parish (born 30 November 1971) is a British rower. He competed in the men's eight event at the 1996 Summer Olympics.

He stroked the crew that won the 1992 Grand Challenge Cup at the Henley Royal Regatta.

He rowed for the St Edmund's College Boat Club in The Boat Race 1994.
