= Richard Hamilton (rower) =

British rower

Personal information
- Nationality: British
- Born: 29 September 1973 (age 51); Plymouth, England

Sport
- Sport: Rowing

Richard Hamilton (born 29 September 1973) is a British former representative rower. He competed in the men's eight event at the 1996 Summer Olympics.

Hamilton relocated to New Zealand then Australia and took up dairy farming. His son Fergus Hamilton is an Australian representative rower. He won a World Junior Championship in 2017.
