= Valeriy Samara =

Ukrainian rower

Personal information
- Nationality: Ukrainian
- Born: 29 August 1965 (age 59)

Sport
- Sport: Rowing

Valeriy Samara (born 29 August 1965) is a Ukrainian rower. He competed in the men's eight event at the 1996 Summer Olympics.
