= Ihor Martynenko =

Ukrainian rower

Personal information
- Nationality: Ukrainian
- Born: 24 August 1970 (age 54)

Sport
- Sport: Rowing

Ihor Martynenko (born 24 August 1970) is a Ukrainian rower. He competed in the men's eight event at the 1996 Summer Olympics.
