= Graham Smith (rower) =

British rower (born 1975)

Personal information
- Nationality: British (English)
- Born: 21 June 1975 St Albans, England
- Education: St Edmund's College, Cambridge

Sport
- Sport: Rowing
Medal record
Rowing
Representing Great Britain
World Rowing Championships
Gold medal – first place	2000 Zagreb	M4+
Silver medal – second place	1999 St. Catharines	M4+

Graham Smith (born 21 June 1975) is a British former rower and world champion, who competed at the 1996 Summer Olympics.

== Biography ==
At the 1996 Olympic Games in Atlanta, USA, he participated in the men's eight event.

As a member of the St Edmund's College Boat Club, Smith helped Cambridge win both The Boat Race 1998 and The Boat Race 1999.
