= Mark Platt =

Canadian rower

Personal information
- Born: 29 March 1973 (age 53) Peterborough, Ontario, Canada

Sport
- Sport: Rowing
Medal record
Representing Canada
Pan American Games
Silver medal – second place	1995 Mar del Plata	Coxed fours
Silver medal – second place	1995 Mar del Plata	Eights
Summer Universiade
Bronze medal – third place	1993 Buffalo	Lightweight eights

Mark Andrew Platt (born 29 March 1973) is a Canadian rower. He competed in the men's eight event at the 1996 Summer Olympics.
