= Mattia Trombetta =

Italian rower

Personal information
- Nationality: Italian
- Born: 23 August 1974 (age 50); Como, Italy

Sport
- Sport: Rowing

Mattia Trombetta (born 23 August 1974) is an Italian rower. He competed in the men's eight event at the 1996 Summer Olympics.
