= Adam Parfitt =

Canadian rower

Personal information
- Nationality: Canadian
- Born: 22 April 1974 (age 52) Victoria, British Columbia, Canada

Sport
- Sport: Rowing
Medal record
Representing Canada
Pan American Games
Silver medal – second place	1995 Mar del Plata	Coxless fours
Silver medal – second place	1995 Mar del Plata	Eights
Summer Universiade
Bronze medal – third place	1993 Buffalo	Lightweight eights

Adam David Parfitt (born 22 April 1974) is a Canadian rower. He competed in the men's eight event at the 1996 Summer Olympics.
