= The Boat Race 1998 =

144th Boat Race
- Date: 28 March 1998
- Winner: Cambridge
- Margin of victory: 3 lengths
- Winning time: 16 minutes 19 seconds
- Overall record (Cambridge–Oxford): 75–68
- Umpire: Mike Sweeney (Cambridge)

Other races
- Reserve winner: Isis
- Women's winner: Cambridge

The 144th Boat Race took place on 28 March 1998. Held annually, the Boat Race is a side-by-side rowing race between crews from the Universities of Oxford and Cambridge along the River Thames. Cambridge, with the heaviest crew in the history of the event, won by three lengths in a record time of 16 minutes 19 seconds.

In the reserve race, Oxford's Isis defeated Cambridge's Goldie in a time which equalled the record, while Cambridge won the Women's Boat Race.

== Background ==
The Boat Race is a side-by-side rowing competition between the University of Oxford (sometimes referred to as the "Dark Blues") and the University of Cambridge (sometimes referred to as the "Light Blues"). First held in 1829, the race takes place on the 4.2-mile (6.8 km) Championship Course on the River Thames in southwest London. The rivalry is a major point of honour between the two universities and followed throughout the United Kingdom and broadcast worldwide. Cambridge went into the race as reigning champions, having won the 1997 race by two lengths, and led overall with 74 victories to Oxford's 68 (excluding the "dead heat" of 1877).

The first Women's Boat Race took place in 1927, but did not become an annual fixture until the 1960s. Until 2014, the contest was conducted as part of the Henley Boat Races, but as of the 2015 race, it is held on the River Thames, on the same day as the men's main and reserve races. The reserve race, contested between Oxford's Isis boat and Cambridge's Goldie boat has been held since 1965. It usually takes place on the Tideway, prior to the main Boat Race.

The race was sponsored for the final time by Beefeater Gin who had invested £1.4 million in the event over the previous three-year contract period. They would be replaced by Aberdeen Asset Management for the 1999 race.

== Crews ==
The official weigh-in was held at The Hurlingham Club in London on 23 March. The Cambridge crew, the heaviest in the history of the Boat Race, weighed an average of 13 pounds (5.9 kg) per rower more than their opponents, the second-largest disparity between the Universities since 1829.

Oxford boat club president Andrew Lindsay acknowledged the weight difference: "We are quite happy, it presents a challenge. They have got the equivalent of another cox to carry along." Cambridge's president David Cassidy (who would row for Goldie) was blunt in his assessment: "A powerful car will beat a less powerful car." Cambridge, coached by Robin Williams, suffered a setback: their number five, Toby Wallace, was ill in the run-in to the race, and did not participate in the outings just prior to the main event. Despite that, The Times reported that the Light Blue boat looked "ominously powerful".

Oxford saw five members of their 1997 crew return, while Cambridge welcomed back two in Brad Crombie and Alex Story. Two German world champions rowed for Cambridge: Stefan Forster and Marc Weber won gold in the men's eight at the 1995 World Rowing Championships.

Seat	Oxford			Cambridge		
Seat	Name	College	Weight	Name	College	Weight
Bow	Charlie P A Humphreys	Oriel	12 st 11 lb	Graham Smith	St Edmund's College	14 st 7 lb
2	James B Roycroft	Keble	13 st 6 lb	Paul A Cunningham	Gonville and Caius	13 st 6 lb
3	Jurgen Hecht	Keble	14 st 11 lb	Jonathan G Bull	Emmanuel	16 st 1 lb
4	Henrik K Nilsson	Hertford	14 st 1 lb	Brad Crombie	Peterhouse	14 st 10 lb
5	E R Coode	Keble	14 st 6 lb	Toby J Wallace	Jesus	14 st 12 lb
6	A J R Lindsay (P)	Brasenose	14 st 7 lb	A Story	St Edmund's	15 st 12 lb
7	Paul A Berger	Lincoln	14 st 5 lb	S F Forster	Peterhouse	16 st 2 lb
Stroke	Nick J Robinson	Lincoln	13 st 7 lb	M Weber	St Edmund's College	13 st 11 lb
Cox	P A Greaney	St Edmund Hall	8 st 8 lb	A J Potts	Trinity Hall	8 st 5 lb
Source: (P) – boat club president

== Race ==
The Championship Course along which the Boat Race is contested

Cambridge were pre-race favourite for the sixth consecutive year. Oxford won the toss and elected to start from the Middlesex station, only the eighth time such a decision has been made since 1945. The river conditions were described as "smooth". Despite holding a brief early lead, a series of blade clashes disrupted Oxford and Cambridge's cox Potts called for a push which saw his boat pass the Mile Post with a canvas' lead. At Hammersmith Bridge, by which time Umpire Mike Sweeney had issued fifty separate warnings to the crews, Cambridge were a length ahead and stretched away to win by three lengths in a record time of 16 minutes 19 seconds, 26 seconds quicker than the previous best time set by Oxford in the 1984 race. Cambridge beat the existing course record by 26 seconds, while Oxford finished 9 seconds behind them.

In the reserve race, Oxford's Isis beat Cambridge's Goldie by 2 1/2 lengths, their first victory in nine years, and in a time of 17 minutes 2 seconds which equalled the 1996 record. Cambridge won the 50th Women's Boat Race by 1 1/4 lengths in a time of 6 minutes and 25 seconds, their seventh consecutive victory.

== Reaction ==
Weber remarked "we practised our pushes and made them really effective." Oxford's president Lindsay conceded "Cambridge had that extra gear to increase their base for short times. It demolished us." His stroke, Nick Robinson, commented: "It was going pretty well until the clash, but they came out better than we did." Umpire Mike Sweeney was unperturbed: "They were both fighting for the same water. That is not a question of disqualification." Cambridge's Story said his crew were confident before the race: "We were never in doubt that we would win" and despite the record time, he remarked "We can row a lot better than that."
