= Porter Collins =

American rower (born 1975)

Personal information
- Born: Atwood Peter Collins; June 27, 1975 (age 51)
- Education: Brown University

Sport
- Sport: Rowing
Medal record
Men's rowing
Representing United States
World Rowing Championships
Gold medal – first place	1995 Tampere	M4+
Gold medal – first place	1998 Cologne	M8+
Gold medal – first place	1999 St. Catharines	M8+

Atwood Peter Collins, known as Porter Collins (born June 27, 1975), is an American rower and investor. He finished 5th in the men's eight at the 1996 Summer Olympics and the 2000 Summer Olympics. He is also a three time world Champion in 1995, 1998 and 1999.

Collins worked as an analyst for the Morgan Stanley-owned hedge fund FrontPoint Partners during the United States housing bubble in the 2000s. FrontPoint, along with Collins and his colleagues including Steve Eisman, were the subject of Michael Lewis's book The Big Short due to the fund having correctly predicted the market crash in 2008. He was portrayed by Hamish Linklater in the film The Big Short, which was based on Lewis's book.

== Biography ==
Atwood Peter Collins was born on June 27, 1975. His mother worked as an interior designer and his father was an executive vice president at M&T Bank.

Collins attended the Salisbury School in Salisbury, Connecticut, graduating in 1993. He attended Brown University, where he rowed for the Brown Bears and studied history. Collins took a year off from Brown to prepare for the 1996 Summer Olympics. At the Olympics, he finished 5th in the men's eight. Collins graduated from Brown in 1998.

Collins worked for FrontPoint Partners which was acquired by Morgan Stanley.

After leaving FrontPoint, Collins co-founded Seawolf Capital, a hedge fund, with Vincent Daniel, his former FrontPoint colleague. He also managed a portfolio for Citadel until 2019.
