= Yevhen Sharonin =

Ukrainian rower

Personal information
- Nationality: Ukrainian
- Born: 9 September 1971 (age 53)

Sport
- Sport: Rowing

Yevhen Sharonin (born 9 September 1971) is a Ukrainian rower. He competed in the men's eight event at the 1996 Summer Olympics.
