= Oleksandr Kapustin =

Ukrainian rower

Personal information
- Nationality: Ukrainian
- Born: 28 October 1977 (age 47); Skadovsk, Ukrainian SSR, Soviet Union

Sport
- Sport: Rowing

Oleksandr Kapustin (born 28 October 1977) is a Ukrainian rower. He competed in the men's eight event at the 1996 Summer Olympics.
