= Roman Hrynevych =

Ukrainian rower

Personal information
- Nationality: Ukrainian
- Born: 8 December 1971 (age 53)

Sport
- Sport: Rowing

Roman Hrynevych (born 8 December 1971) is a Ukrainian rower. He competed in the men's eight event at the 1996 Summer Olympics.
