= Anton Chermashentsev =

Russian rower

Medal record

Men's rowing

Representing Russia

Olympic Games
Bronze medal – third place	1996 Atlanta	Eight

Anton Viktorovich Chermashentsev (Russian: Антон Викторович Чермашенцев; born 21 June 1976 in Novosibirsk) is a former Olympic rower who competed for Russia in two Olympic Games. He won a bronze medal in the eight competition 1996 Summer Olympics. He was also a participant of 2000 summer Olympics. He received the award of order for services to the fatherland 4th degree.
