= Vladimir Sokolov (rower) =

Russian rower

Medal record

Men's rowing

Representing Russia

Olympic Games
Bronze medal – third place	1996 Atlanta	Eight

Vladimir Sokolov (Russian: Владимир Соколов; born 29 August 1962) is a former Olympic rower. He competed for the Unified Team at the 1992 Summer Olympics and for Russia at the 1996 Summer Olympics, where he won a bronze medal in the men's eight.
