= Ulrich Viefers =

German rower (born 1972)

Medal record

Men's rowing

Representing Germany

Olympic Games
Silver medal – second place	1996 Atlanta	Eight

World Rowing Championships
Bronze medal – third place	1993 Račice	Coxed four

Ulrich Viefers (born 26 May 1972, in Oberhausen) is a German rower.

Ulrich Viefer is 194 cm tall and weighs 93 kg. Viefer's place of residence is in Essen, Germany. He ranked 6th when he rowed for Germany in the 1999 World Rowing Championship that took place in St. Catharines, Canada. He also rowed in 1999 World Rowing Cup III in Lucerne, SUI where he ranked 1st representing Germany. He has competed in 14 competitions from 1990 to 1999. He achieved first place four times in those fourteen competitions.

Competitions from 1990 to 1999
Competition	Place	Year	Ranking
World Rowing Junior Championships	Aiguebelette, FRA	1990	5
World Rowing Championships	Racice, CZE	1993	3
World Rowing Championships	Indianapolis, USA	1994	6
World Rowing Championships	Tampere, FIN	1995	6
Olympic Games	Atlanta, USA	1996	2
World Rowing Cup I	Munich, GER	1997	1
World Rowing Cup II	Paris, FRA	1997	3
World Rowing Cup III	Lucerne, SUI	1997	1
World Rowing Championships	Aiguebelette, FRA	1997	5
World Rowing Cup I	Munich, GER	1998	1
World Rowing Championships	Cologne, GER	1998	2
World Rowing Cup III	Lucerne, SUI	1999	1
World Rowing Championships	St. Catharines, CAN	1999	6
