= Dmitriy Rozinkevich =

Russian rower

Medal record

Men's rowing

Representing Russia

Olympic Games
Bronze medal – third place	1996 Atlanta	Eight

World Championships
Bronze medal – third place	1999 St. Catharines	Eight

European Championships
Silver medal – second place	2008 Marathon	Eight

Dmitriy Vasilyevich Rozinkevich (Russian: Дмитрий Васильевич Розинкевич) (born 1 October 1974 in Svetly) is an Olympic rower who competed for Russia in two Olympic Games. He won a bronze medal in the men's eight at the 1996 Summer Olympics.
