= The Boat Race 1999 =

145th Boat Race
- Date: 3 April 1999
- Winner: Cambridge
- Margin of victory: 3 1/2 lengths
- Winning time: 16 minutes 41 seconds
- Overall record (Cambridge–Oxford): 76–68
- Umpire: Mark Evans (Oxford)

Other races
- Reserve winner: Goldie
- Women's winner: Cambridge

The 145th Boat Race took place on 3 April 1999. Held annually, the Boat Race is a side-by-side rowing race between crews from the Universities of Oxford and Cambridge along the River Thames. Featuring the tallest rower in Boat Race history at that time, Cambridge won the race in the second-fastest time ever. It was their seventh consecutive victory in the event.

In the reserve race, Cambridge's Goldie defeated Oxford's Isis in the fastest time ever, while Cambridge won the Women's Boat Race.

== Background ==
The Boat Race is a side-by-side rowing competition between the University of Oxford (sometimes referred to as the "Dark Blues") and the University of Cambridge (sometimes referred to as the "Light Blues"). First held in 1829, the race takes place on the 4.2-mile (6.8 km) Championship Course on the River Thames in southwest London. The rivalry is a major point of honour between the two universities and followed throughout the United Kingdom and broadcast worldwide. Cambridge went into the race as reigning champions, having won the 1998 race by three lengths, with Cambridge leading overall with 75 victories to Oxford's 68 (excluding the "dead heat" of 1877).

The first Women's Boat Race took place in 1927, but did not become an annual fixture until the 1960s. Up until 2014, the contest was conducted as part of the Henley Boat Races, but as of the 2015 race, it is held on the River Thames, on the same day as the men's main and reserve races. The reserve race, contested between Oxford's Isis boat and Cambridge's Goldie boat has been held since 1965. It usually takes place on the Tideway, prior to the main Boat Race.

Andrew Lindsay was confident that the Oxford crew would be more motivated than their opponents: "our advantage over Cambridge is that we are hungry for the victory. Everyone in the Oxford boat is driven to go and win this damn thing". He was making his third and final appearance in the race having lost in both the 1997 and 1998 race. His grandfather represented Cambridge in the 1930s, and his uncle, Alexander Lindsay, rowed for the losing Oxford crew in the 1959 race before triumphing the following year. Cambridge boat club president and Canadian international rower Brad Crombie was also making his third Boat Race appearance, attempting to complete a hat-trick of victories. Sean Bowden was the head coach of Oxford. His Cambridge counterpart, Robin Williams, suggested "it still feels like all or nothing to us. The fear of defeat, the aim of trying to push the limits is motivation itself". Just as he had done in the 1993 race, umpire Mark Evans introduced modifications to the starting procedure, suggesting that he would be content to hold the crews for up to ten seconds between issuing the "set" and "go" commands. Cambridge's Williams remarked: "I'm happy as long as both crews abide by it", Bowden was nonplussed "Go is when you start races. I'm happy."

The race was sponsored for the first time by Aberdeen Asset Management, and both crews were competing for the Aberdeen Asset Trophy. It was the fiftieth anniversary of the BBC's coverage of the event and over the preceding five years had secured an average audience in excess of six million.

== Crews ==
The Oxford crew weighed-in at an average of 14 st 10 lb (93.2 kg), 0.5 pounds (0.23 kg) more per rower than Cambridge. Josh West, rowing at number four for Cambridge, became the tallest rower in Boat Race history at 6 ft 9 in (2.06 m). The Oxford crew comprised three Britons, three Americans, a Swede, a Canadian and a German, while Cambridge were represented by five Britons, two Americans, a German and a Canadian. Three former Blues returned for Cambridge in Wallace, Crombie and Smith, while Oxford saw Humphreys and Lindsay return. Vian Sharif, the Cambridge cox, became the tenth female to steer a Boat Race crew, and was the lightest competitor at the event since the 1986 race.

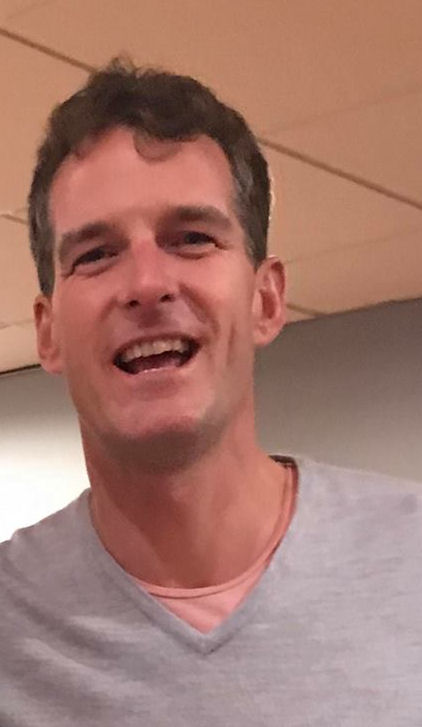
Dan Snow (pictured in 2019) rowed at number 3 for Oxford.

Seat	Oxford				Cambridge			
Seat	Name	Nationality	College	Weight	Name	Nationality	College	Weight
Bow	Charlie P A Humphreys (P)	British	Oriel	13 st 1.5 lb	Toby J Wallace	British	Jesus	15 st 2 lb
2	Henrik K Nilsson	Swedish	Hertford	14 st 2 lb	T A Stallard	British	Jesus	13 st 8.5 lb
3	D R Snow	British	Balliol	15 st 12 lb	Brad Crombie (P)	Canadian	Peterhouse	14 st 12 lb
4	Toby H Ayer	American	Worcester	16 st 0 lb	A J West	American	Gonville and Caius	15 st 2.5 lb
5	Martin Crotty	American	Keble	14 st 10 lb	David O M Ellis	American	Trinity	14 st 4 lb
6	Morgan A L Crooks	Canadian	Keble	14 st 4 lb	K M West	British	Christ's	14 st 13 lb
7	A J R Lindsay	British	Brasenose	14 st 4 lb	Graham Smith	British	St Edmund's	14 st 2.5 lb
Stroke	Colin von Ettingshausen	German	Keble	15 st 2 lb	Tim Wooge	German	Magdalene	15 st 2 lb
Cox	Neil J O'Donnell	American	Keble	7 st 13 lb	Vian Sharif	British	Clare	6 st 10.5 lb
Source: (P) – boat club president

== Race ==
The Championship Course along which the Boat Race is contested

Bookmakers could not initially separate the crews, offering odds on for either boat to win. However, as the start of the race approached, Williams had suggested that he was worried by his crew's "inconsistency" and Oxford were declared favourites. Cambridge won the toss and elected to start from the Surrey station. Despite being warned by the umpire, Cambridge were soon half-a-length ahead, and a second clear by the Mile Post. The lead was extended to a length by Hammersmith Bridge and Sharif had steered her boat into a better angle of attack. Pushing on, Cambridge were seven seconds up by Chiswick Steps and nine seconds at Barnes Railway Bridge. They passed the finishing post 3 1/2 lengths ahead, with an eleven-second advantage over the Dark Blues. The Light Blues finished in 16 minutes 41 seconds, a time only bettered once before, in 1998. It was the first time since 1936 that Cambridge had secured seven consecutive victories.

In the reserve race, Cambridge's Goldie beat Oxford's Isis by 1 1/2 lengths, their ninth victory in ten years, and in a record time of 16 minutes 58 seconds which beat the fastest time recorded in 1996 and repeated in 1998. Cambridge won the 51st Women's Boat Race by one length in a time of 6 minutes 1 second, their eighth consecutive victory.

== Reaction ==
Oxford's Bowden was dumbstruck: "I'm really floored. I just haven't got any answers until I talk to the crew." His number four, Toby Ayer admitted: "my impression is that they were quicker than us and that is a very hard thing to have to say." Cambridge's Williams noted: "I thought it would be a bit more competitive than that." Cambridge boat club president Crombie exclaimed "that's the most fun I've ever had rowing for Cambridge."
