= Andrey Glukhov =

Russian rower

Medal record

Men's rowing

Representing Russia

Olympic Games
| Bronze medal – third place | 1996 Atlanta | Eight |

World Championships
| Bronze medal – third place | 1999 St. Catharines | Eight |

Andrei Valeryevich Glukhov (Russian: Андрей Валерьевич Глухов) (born 1 June 1972) is a former Olympic rower who competed for Russia in two Olympic Games. He won a bronze medal in the men's eight at the 1996 Summer Olympics.
