= Henk-Jan Zwolle =

Dutch rower

Personal information
- Born: 30 November 1964 (age 61) Enschede, Overijssel, Netherlands
- Height: 197 cm (6 ft 6 in)
- Weight: 93 kg (205 lb)
- Spouse: Tessa Appeldoorn

Sport
- Sport: Rowing
- Club: R.S.V.U. Okeanos Amsterdam
Medal record
Men's rowing
Representing the Netherlands
Olympic Games
Gold medal – first place	1996 Atlanta	Eight
Bronze medal – third place	1992 Barcelona	Double sculls
World Championships
Gold medal – first place	1991 Vienna	Double sculls
Silver medal – second place	1994 Indianapolis	Eight
Silver medal – second place	1995 Tampere	Eight

Henk-Jan Zwolle (born 30 November 1964 in Enschede, Overijssel) is a former rower from the Netherlands and two-time Olympic medallist. He competed in three consecutive Summer Olympics, starting in 1988.

Zwolle and Nico Rienks won gold in double sculls at the 1991 World Rowing Championships in Vienna. The following year, they won a bronze medal in the men's double sculls at the 1992 Summer Olympics. At the 1996 Summer Olympics, he claimed the gold medal in the men's eight event with the Holland Acht (Holland Eight).

He married fellow Dutch rower Tessa Appeldoorn in October 1998.
