= Wolfram Huhn =

German rower (born 1973)

Medal record

Men's rowing

Representing Germany

Olympic Games
Silver medal – second place	1996 Atlanta	Eight

World Rowing Championships
Bronze medal – third place	2000 Zagreb	Coxed four

Wolfram Huhn (born 3 December 1973 in Würzburg) is a German rower.
