= Andrei Bănică =

Romanian rower

Personal information
- Full name: Andrei Nicolae Bănică
- Born: 23 November 1977 (age 48) Constanţa, Romania
Medal record
Men's rowing
Representing Romania
World Championships
Gold medal – first place	2001 Lucerne	M8+
Silver medal – second place	1997 Aiguebelette	M8+
Bronze medal – third place	1998 Cologne	M8+

Andrei Nicolae Bănică (born 23 November 1977 in Constanţa) is a Romanian rower.
