= Mark Kleinschmidt (rower) =

German rower (born 1974)

Personal information
- Born: 28 May 1974 (age 52) Oberhausen, West Germany

Sport
- Sport: Rowing
- Club: RRG Mülheim
Medal record
Men's rowing
Representing Germany
Olympic Games
Silver medal – second place	1996 Atlanta	Eight
World Rowing Championships
Bronze medal – third place	1993 Račice	Coxed four

Mark Kleinschmidt (born 28 May 1974) is a German rower.

Kleinschmidt won bronze at the 1993 World Rowing Championships in Račice with the coxed four. He was a member of the team that won the silver medal in men's eight at the 1996 Summer Olympics in Atlanta. He was born in Oberhausen, North Rhine-Westphalia.
