= Peter Thiede =

German rowing cox (born 1968)

Medal record

Men's rowing

Representing Germany

Olympic Games
Silver medal – second place	1996 Atlanta	Eight

World Rowing Championships

Representing East Germany
Silver medal – second place	1987 Copenhagen	M8+
Silver medal – second place	1989 Bled	M8+
Bronze medal – third place	1990 Tasmania	M8+

Representing Germany
Gold medal – first place	1995 Tampere	M8+
Gold medal – first place	2006 Eton	M8+
Silver medal – second place	1998 Cologne	M8+
Silver medal – second place	2002 Seville	M8+
Silver medal – second place	2007 Munich	M8+
Bronze medal – third place	2001 Lucerne	M8+
Bronze medal – third place	2005 Gifu	M8+

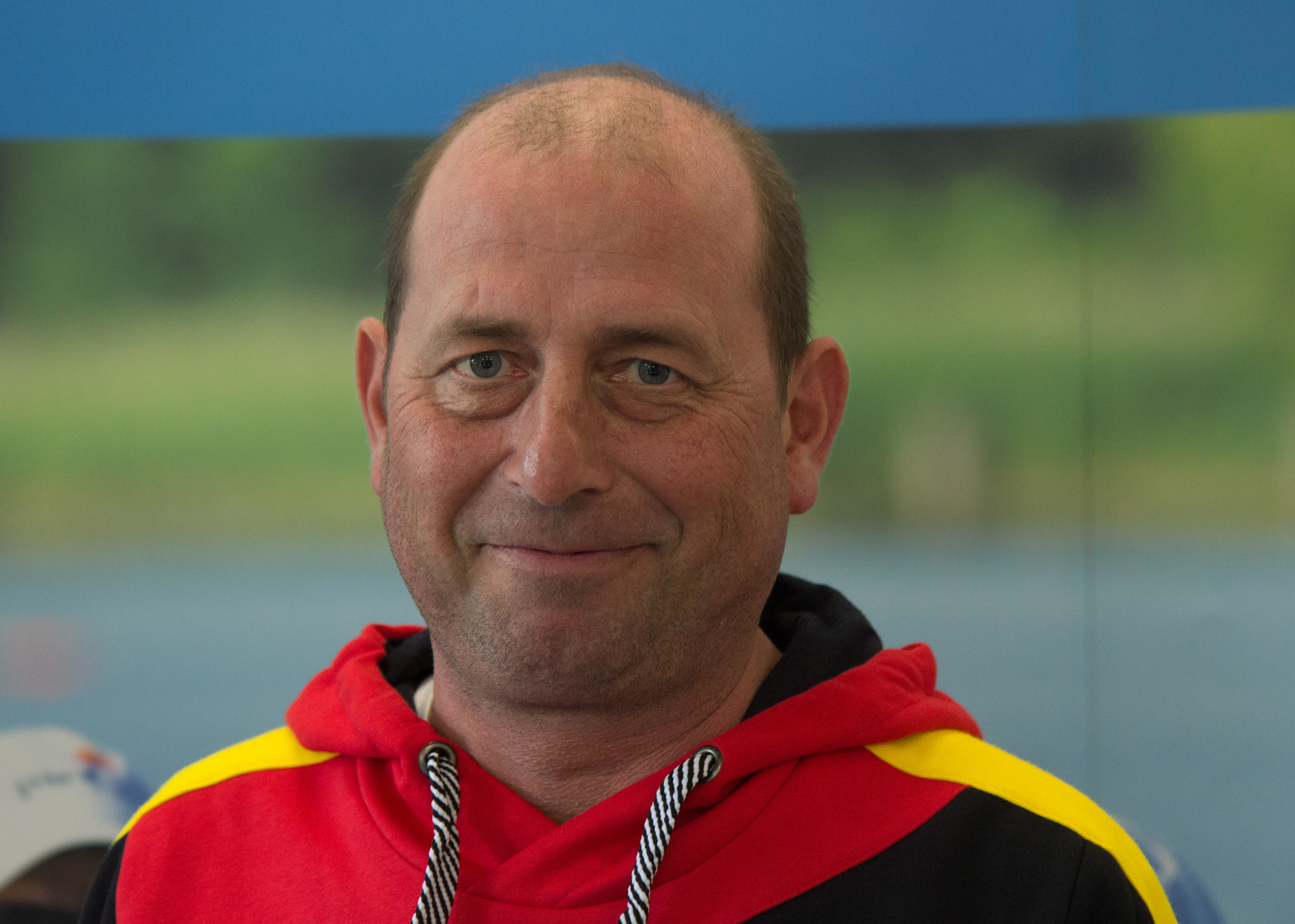
Ruderverband Peter Thiode

Peter Thiede (born 13 February 1968 in Ueckermünde, Bezirk Neubrandenburg) is a German rowing cox.
