= Nikolay Aksyonov =

Russian rower (born 1970)

Medal record

Men's rowing

Representing Russia

Olympic Games
Bronze medal – third place	1996 Atlanta	Eight

World Championships
Bronze medal – third place	1999 St. Catharines	Eight

Nikolay Aleksandrovich Aksyonov (Russian: Николай Александрович Аксëнов; born 8 June 1970) is an Olympic rower who competed for Russia in two Olympic Games. He won a bronze medal in the eight competition in the 1996 Summer Olympics. He was born in Sortavala.
