= Alex Story (rower) =

British rower (born 1974)

Alexander "Alex" Story (born 6 December 1974) is a former British rower, who rowed in the British men's eight at the 1996 Olympic Games in Atlanta. Story has unsuccessfully stood as a candidate for the Conservative Party on several occasions.

== Rowing ==
Story was on the Great Britain rowing team for the 1996 Summer Olympics, competing in the men's eight.

He rowed for Great Britain as a junior, an under-23 and a senior athlete. His career spanned from 1992 to 1998.

In 1995, at the World Rowing Championships in Tampere, Finland, he qualified for the 1996 Atlanta Olympic Games. He retained his place for the 1997 World Rowing Championships in Aiguebelette where the British eight finished fourth.

He rowed for Cambridge against Oxford in the Boat Races of 1997 and 1998. In the former he was the heaviest man competing, and was credited with having been the difference between the two crews.

== Political activity ==
He has subsequently been active in the Conservative Party. In 2005, he contested Denton and Reddish at the general election; in 2010, he fought Wakefield, and in 2015, at short notice, he stood for Leeds North West. In Denton and Reddish, a safe seat for the Labour Party, Story came a distant second. At the next election, his candidacy in the marginal Wakefield constituency saw Story finish less than 2,000 votes behind the incumbent Labour MP. In 2015, Story came third behind the Liberal Democrats and Labour, in what was a marginal contest between those two parties.

He was placed second on the Conservative party list for the Yorkshire and the Humber region for the 2014 European election; however, only one Conservative was elected. After the elevation of MEP Timothy Kirkhope to the House of Lords in October 2016, Story was asked by the region's returning officer to take the vacant seat. To be returned, Story needed the Conservative Party to re-nominate him, which they refused to do; Story unsuccessfully asked the High Court to intervene. The Conservative Party subsequently appointed John Procter, who had been third on the party list, as the replacement, rather than Story.

In the 2016 European Union membership referendum he campaigned for Britain to leave the European Union. Story has written for publications such as The Daily Telegraph, and City A.M..

On 5 November 2017, the Conservative MP for Tamworth, Chris Pincher, resigned as Comptroller of the Household (Assistant Whip) and voluntarily referred himself to the Conservative Party's complaints procedure and the police after Story said that he was previously the subject of unwanted sexual advances from Pincher. Story had allegedly been invited to Pincher's flat, where the latter massaged Story's neck and talked about his "future in the Conservative Party", before changing into a bathrobe. Recounting the episode, Story said that Pincher's advances made him seem like a "pound-shop Harvey Weinstein". (Note: In 2017, the American film producer Harvey Weinstein had been accused of rape, sexual assault and sexual abuse, leading to the #MeToo movement against sexual abuse, sexual harassment, and rape culture; "pound shop" is a reference to British high street discount stores such as Poundland.) Pincher said that "I do not recognise either the events or the interpretation placed on them" and that "if Mr Story has ever felt offended by anything I said then I can only apologise to him". On 23 December 2017, the Conservative Party's investigating panel determined that Pincher had not breached the code of conduct.
