= Sergey Matveyev =

Russian rower

Medal record

Men's rowing

Representing Russia

Olympic Games
Bronze medal – third place	1996 Atlanta	Eight

World Championships
Bronze medal – third place	1999 St. Catharines	Eight

Sergei Yuryevich Matveyev (Russian: Серге́й Юрьевич Матвеев) (born 8 September 1972 in Pskov) is a former Olympic rower who competed for Russia in three Olympic Games. He won a bronze medal in the eight competition.
