= Roman Monchenko =

Russian rower (1964–2020)

Medal record

Men's rowing

Representing Russia

Olympic Games
Bronze medal – third place	1996 Atlanta	Eight

Roman Vitalyevich Monchenko (Russian: Роман Витальевич Монченко; 9 August 1964 – 2 January 2020) was a Russian Olympic rower who competed for the Unified Team at the 1992 Summer Olympics and for Russia at the 1996 Summer Olympics, where he won a bronze medal as a member of the men's eight team.
