= Vladimir Volodenkov =

Russian rower

Medal record

Representing Russia

Men's rowing

Olympic Games
Bronze medal – third place	1996 Atlanta	Eight

World Championships
Bronze medal – third place	1999 St. Catharines	Eight

European Championships
Silver medal – second place	2008 Marathon	Eight

Vladimir Vladimirovich Volodenkov (Russian: Владимир Владимирович Володенков) (born 25 April 1972 in Leningrad) is an Olympic rower who competed for Russia in three Olympic Games. He won a bronze medal in the men's eight at the 1996 Summer Olympics.
