= Detlef Kirchhoff =

German rower (born 1967)

Medal record

Men's rowing

Representing East Germany

Olympic Games
Silver medal – second place	1988 Seoul	Coxed pair

World Rowing Championships
Gold medal – first place	1990 Tasmania	Coxed four

Representing Germany

Olympic Games
Bronze medal – third place	1992 Barcelona	Eight
Silver medal – second place	1996 Atlanta	Eight

World Rowing Championships
Silver medal – second place	1993 Roudnice	Coxless pair
Gold medal – first place	1995 Tampere	Eight
Gold medal – first place	1998 Köln	Coxless pair

Detlef Kirchhoff (born 21 May 1967 in Halberstadt) is a German rower, who competed for the SG Dynamo Potsdam / Sportvereinigung (SV) Dynamo. He won the medals at the international rowing competitions. He competed at four Olympic Games, winning medals at three of them.
