= Niels van Steenis =

Dutch rower

Medal record

Men's rowing

Representing the Netherlands

Olympic Games
Gold medal – first place	1996 Atlanta	Eight

Niels Henning van Steenis (born 3 November 1969 in Groningen) is a former rower from the Netherlands, who competed for his native country at the 1996 Summer Olympics in Atlanta, Georgia. There he won the gold medal with the Holland Acht (Holland Eights).
