= Niels van der Zwan =

Dutch rower

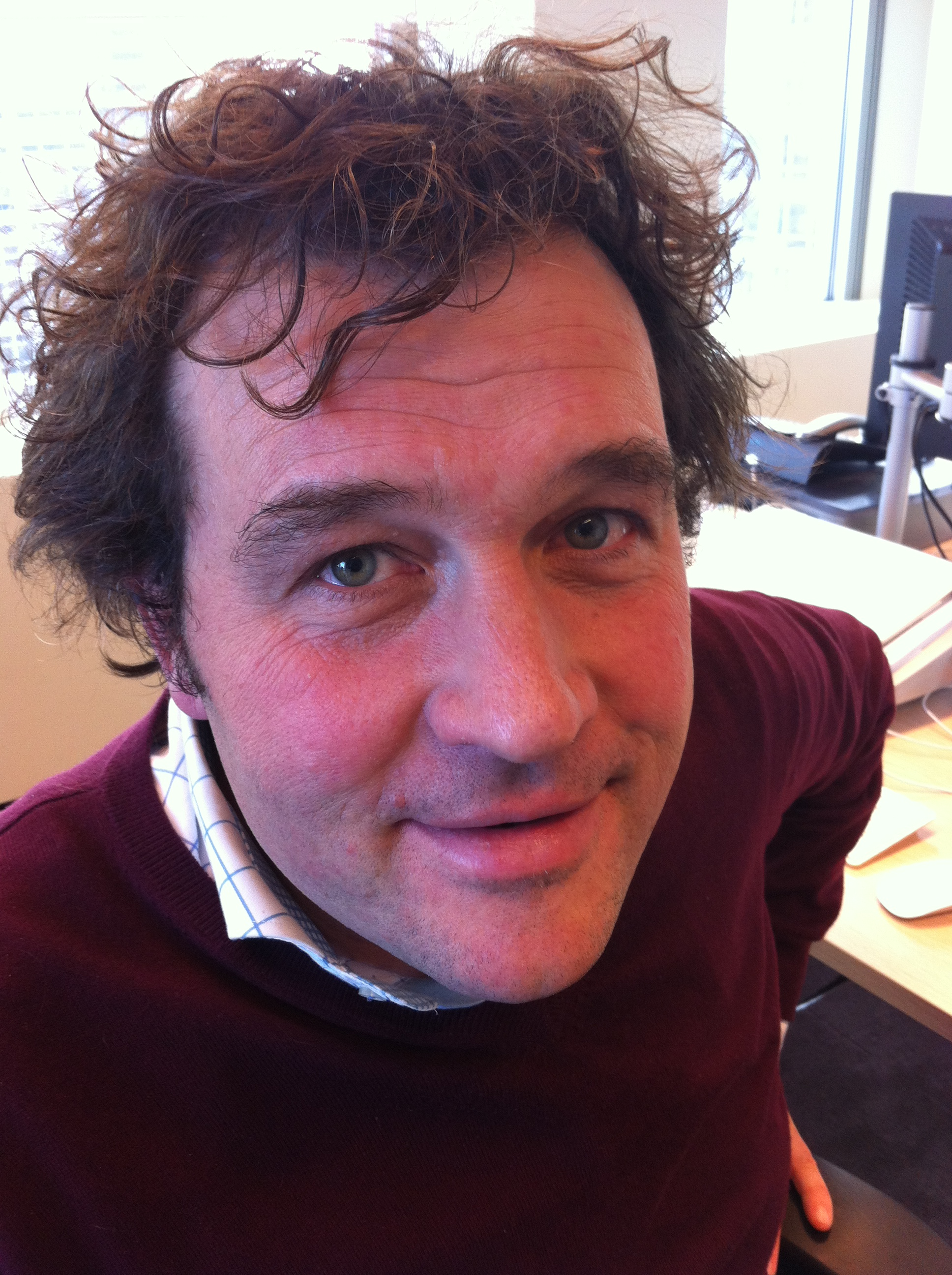

Personal information
- Born: 25 June 1967 (age 59) Scheveningen, South Holland, the Netherlands

Sport
- Sport: rowing
Medal record
Men's rowing
Representing the Netherlands
Olympic Games
Gold medal – first place	1996 Atlanta	Eight

Cornelis Pieter "Niels" van der Zwan (born 25 June 1967 in Scheveningen, South Holland) is a former rower from the Netherlands, who competed for his native country at the 1996 Summer Olympics in Atlanta, Georgia. There he won the gold medal with the Holland Acht (Holland Eights). He also competed at the 1992 and 2000 Summer Olympics.
