= Francesco Mattei =

Italian rower

Personal information
- Nationality: Italian
- Born: 19 September 1973 (age 51); Como, Italy

Sport
- Sport: Rowing

Francesco Mattei (born 19 September 1973) is an Italian rower. He competed in the men's eight event at the 1996 Summer Olympics.
