= Pavel Melnikov (rower) =

Russian rower

Medal record

Representing Russia

Men's rowing

Olympic Games
Bronze medal – third place	1996 Atlanta	Eight

World Championships
Bronze medal – third place	1999 St. Catharines	Eight

Pavel Vladimirovich Melnikov (Russian: Павел Владимирович Мельников; born 8 August 1969 in Novocherkassk) is an Olympic rower who competed for Russia in the two Olympic Games. He won bronze medal in the eight competition 1996 Summer Olympics.
