= Willemijn Duyster =

Dutch field hockey player

Personal information
- Born: 5 April 1970 (age 56)
Medal record
Women's field hockey
Representing the Netherlands
Olympic Games
Bronze medal – third place	1996 Atlanta	Team competition
Champions Trophy
Silver medal – second place	1993 Amstelveen	Team competition
Bronze medal – third place	1997 Berlin	Team competition

Willemijn Margaretha Duyster (born 5 April 1970 in Amsterdam, North Holland) is a former Dutch field hockey defender, who played 87 international matches for the Dutch national team, in which she scored no goals.

A player from HGC in the 1990s, she competed at the 1996 Summer Olympics, winning the bronze medal under the guidance of coach Tom van 't Hek. At the same Olympic tournament in Atlanta, Georgia her brother Jeroen won the gold medal with the men's rowing eights.
