= Robert Walker (rower) =

Australian rower

Personal information
- Born: 30 December 1973 (age 52)

Sport
- Sport: Rowing
Medal record
Men's rowing
Representing Australia
World Rowing Championships
| Bronze medal – third place | 1997 Aiguebelette | M8+ |
| Bronze medal – third place | 1995 Tampere | M2- |
| Bronze medal – third place | 1994 Indianapolis | M2- |
Commonwealth Rowing Championships
| Silver medal – second place | 1994 Ontario | M2- |

Robert Walker (born 30 December 1973) is a former Australian rower. He is an Olympian and a medalist at World Rowing Championships.

== State and club rowing ==
Walker first made state selection for New South Wales in the 1992 youth eight which contested and won the Noel Wilkinson Trophy at the Australian Rowing Championships. In 1994 he was selected in the New South Wales senior eight contesting the King's Cup at the Interstate Regatta. He rowed in further New South Wales King's Cup eights crew in 1995, 1996, 1997, 1998 and 2000. It was a particular period of Victorian state dominance with the Victorian eight seated with members of the Oarsome Foursome and Walker rowed to five King's Cup second places in New South Wales eights but never a victory.

== International representative rowing ==
Walker made his Australian representative debut in a coxless pair at the 1994 World Rowing Championships in Indianapolis rowing with Richard Wearne. They rowed to a third placing and a bronze medal. They stayed together into 1995 and continued to be coached by Harald Jahrling. At the 1995 World Rowing Championships in Tampere they took silver finishing second behind the formidable British crew of Redgrave and Pinsent.

In the 1996 Olympic year, Walker moved into the seven seat of the Australian men's eight. At Atlanta 1996 with Walker and Wearne in the stern end, the Australian eight made a sixth place finish. In 1997 Walker moved into the bow seat of the eight. He raced in the eight at two World Rowing Cups in Europe that year and then at the Henley Royal Regatta as an Australian Institute of Sport crew they contested and won the 1997 Grand Challenge Cup. The eight then raced at the 1997 World Rowing Championships in Aiguebelette where they took a bronze medal.
