= Jeroen Duyster =

Dutch rower (born 1966)

Personal information
- Born: 27 August 1966 (age 60) Amsterdam, Netherlands

Sport
- Sport: Rowing
Medal record
Representing the Netherlands
Olympic Games
Gold medal – first place	1996 Atlanta	Eight
World Championships
Silver medal – second place	1994 Indianapolis	Eight
Silver medal – second place	1995 Tampere	Eight
Summer Universiade
Bronze medal – third place	1989 Duisburg	Coxed fours

Jeroen Tarquinis Cornelis Duyster (born 27 August 1966) is a former coxswain from the Netherlands, who won a gold medal with the Holland Acht (Holland Eights) as a cox at the 1996 Summer Olympics in Atlanta, Georgia. He is the older brother of former Dutch field hockey international Willemijn Duyster, who won the bronze medal at the same Olympic tournament.
