= Richard Wearne =

Australian-born Sydney-based professional photographer

Personal information
- Nationality: Australian
- Born: 10 April 1972 Sydney, New South Wales
- Education: Newington College
- Occupation: Photographer
- Website: Richard Wearne
Medal record
Men's rowing
Representing Australia
World Championships
Bronze medal – third place	1997 Aiguebelette	M8+
Silver medal – second place	1995 Tampere	Coxless pairs
Bronze medal – third place	1994 Indianapolis	Coxless pairs
Commonwealth Rowing Championships
Silver medal – second place	1994 Ontario	M2-

Richard Alexander Wearne (born 10 April 1972) is an Australian-born Sydney-based professional photographer. He is a former representative rower, an Olympian who won medals at three World Rowing Championships.

== Club and state rowing ==
Wearne was born in Sydney and attended Newington College (1981–1989) where he took up rowing and was coached by Olympian and Old Newingtonian Michael Morgan OAM. His senior club rowing was from the Sydney Rowing Club. After the conclusion of his international competitive career he rowed from London's Imperial College Boat Club in 2003.

Wearne first made state selection for New South Wales in the 1992 senior eight which contested the King's Cup at the Australian Rowing Championships. He rowed in further New South Wales King's Cup eights in 1993, 1994, 1995 (as stroke) 1996, 1997, 1998 and 2000. It was a particular period of Victorian state dominance with the Victorian eight seated with members of the Oarsome Foursome and Wearne rowed to five King's Cup second places in New South Wales eights but never a victory.

== International representative rowing ==
Wearne made his Australian representative debut in a coxless pair at the 1994 World Rowing Championships in Indianapolis rowing with Robert Walker. They rowed to a third placing and a bronze medal. They stayed together into 1995 and continued to be coached by Harald Jahrling. At the 1995 World Rowing Championships in Tampere they took silver finishing second behind the formidable British crew of Redgrave and Pinsent.

In the 1996 Olympic year, Wearne moved into the stroke seat of the Australian men's eight. At Atlanta 1996 with Wearne and Walker in the stern end the Australian eight made a sixth-place finish. In 1997 he held his seat at stroke of the eight. As an Australian Institute of Sport selection eight they contested and won the 1997 Grand Challenge Cup at the Henley Royal Regatta. The 1997 Australian eight then raced at two World Rowing Cups in Europe before contesting the 1997 World Rowing Championships in Aiguebelette where they took a bronze medal. In 1998 he again stroked the Australian men's eight and at the 1998 World Rowing Championships in Cologne they raced to a six placed finish. Wearne retired from international competitive rowing at the conclusion of that campaign.

== Photographer ==
Wearne is a self-employed photographer in Sydney.
