= Marc Weber (rower, born 1972) =

German rower (born 1972)

Medal record

Men's rowing

Representing Germany

Olympic Games
Silver medal – second place	1996 Atlanta	Eight

World Rowing Championships
Gold medal – first place	1995 Tampere	M8+
Silver medal – second place	1998 Cologne	M8+
Bronze medal – third place	1993 Račice	M4+

Marc Weber (born 21 March 1972 in Bochum) is a German rower.
