= List of Olympic medalists for the United States =

This is a list of the United States athletes who won an Olympic medal since 1992.

== Summer Olympics ==
=== 1992 Barcelona ===
Medal	Name	Sport	Event	Date
Gold	Nelson Diebel	Swimming	Men's 100 meter breaststroke	July 26
Gold	Pablo Morales	Swimming	Men's 100 meter butterfly	July 27
Gold	Nicole Haislett	Swimming	Women's 200 meter freestyle	July 27
Gold	Crissy Ahmann-Leighton*; Nicole Haislett; Angel Martino; Ashley Tappin*; Jenny Thompson; Dara Torres	Swimming	Women's 4 × 100 meter freestyle relay	July 28
Gold	Mark Lenzi	Diving	Men's 3 meter springboard	July 29
Gold	Mike Barrowman	Swimming	Men's 200 meter breaststroke	July 29
Gold	Matt Biondi; Joe Hudepohl; Tom Jager; Shaun Jordan*; Jon Olsen; Joel Thomas*	Swimming	Men's 4 × 100 meter freestyle relay	July 29
Gold	Launi Meili	Shooting	Women's 50 meter rifle three position	July 30
Gold	Melvin Stewart	Swimming	Men's 200 meter butterfly	July 30
Gold	Janet Evans	Swimming	Women's 800 meter freestyle	July 30
Gold	Crissy Ahmann-Leighton; Nicole Haislett*; Megan Kleine*; Lea Loveless; Anita Nall; Summer Sanders*; Jenny Thompson; Janie Wagstaff*	Swimming	Women's 4 × 100 meter medley relay	July 30
Gold	Mike Stulce	Athletics	Men's shot put	July 31
Gold	David Berkoff*; Matt Biondi*; Hans Dersch*; Nelson Diebel; Pablo Morales; Jon Olsen; Jeff Rouse; Melvin Stewart*	Swimming	Men's 4 × 100 meter medley relay	July 31
Gold	Summer Sanders	Swimming	Women's 200 meter butterfly	July 31
Gold	Gail Devers	Athletics	Women's 100 meters	August 1
Gold	Jackie Joyner-Kersee	Athletics	Heptathlon	August 2
Gold	Joe Jacobi; Scott Strausbaugh	Canoeing	Slalom C-2	August 2
Gold	Trent Dimas	Gymnastics	Horizontal bar	August 2
Gold	Mike Conley	Athletics	Men's triple jump	August 3
Gold	Hal Haenel; Mark Reynolds	Sailing	Star	August 3
Gold	Quincy Watts	Athletics	Men's 400 meters	August 5
Gold	Karen Josephson; Sarah Josephson	Synchronized swimming	Duet	August 5
Gold	Michael Marsh	Athletics	Men's 200 meters	August 6
Gold	Kevin Young	Athletics	Men's 400 meter hurdles	August 6
Gold	Carl Lewis	Athletics	Men's long jump	August 6
Gold	Gwen Torrence	Athletics	Women's 200 meters	August 6
Gold	Kristen Babb-Sprague	Synchronized swimming	Solo	August 6
Gold	Bruce Baumgartner	Wrestling	Freestyle –130 kilogram	August 6
Gold	Jennifer Capriati	Tennis	Women's singles	August 7
Gold	John Smith	Wrestling	Freestyle –62 kilogram	August 7
Gold	Kevin Jackson	Wrestling	Freestyle –82 kilogram	August 7
Gold	Leroy Burrell; James Jett*; Carl Lewis; Michael Marsh; Dennis Mitchell	Athletics	Men's 4 × 100 meter relay	August 8
Gold	Darnell Hall*; Charles Jenkins*; Michael Johnson; Steve Lewis; Andrew Valmon; Quincy Watts	Athletics	Men's 4 × 400 meter relay	August 8
Gold	Evelyn Ashford; Michelle Finn*; Carlette Guidry; Esther Jones; Gwen Torrence	Athletics	Women's 4 × 100 meter relay	August 8
Gold	United States men's national basketball team: Charles Barkley; Larry Bird; Clyde Drexler; Patrick Ewing; Earvin Johnson; Michael Jordan; Christian Laettner; Karl Malone; Chris Mullin; Scottie Pippen; David Robinson; John Stockton	Basketball	Men's tournament	August 8
Gold	Oscar De La Hoya	Boxing	Lightweight	August 8
Gold	Gigi Fernández; Mary Joe Fernández	Tennis	Women's doubles	August 8

=== 1996 Atlanta ===
Medal	Name	Sport	Event	Date
Gold	Tom Dolan	Swimming	Men's 400 meter individual medley	July 21
Gold	Ryan Berube; Josh Davis; Joe Hudepohl; Jon Olsen*; Brad Schumacher	Swimming	Men's 4 × 200 meter freestyle relay	July 21
Gold	Amy Van Dyken	Swimming	Women's 100 meter butterfly	July 21
Gold	Beth Botsford	Swimming	Women's 100 meter backstroke	July 22
Gold	Catherine Fox; Lisa Jacob*; Angel Martino; Jenny Thompson; Melanie Valerio*; Amy Van Dyken	Swimming	Women's 4 × 100 meter freestyle relay	July 22
Gold	Amanda Borden; Amy Chow; Dominique Dawes; Shannon Miller; Dominique Moceanu; Jaycie Phelps; Kerri Strug	Gymnastics	Women's artistic team all around	July 23
Gold	Kim Rhode	Shooting	Women's double trap	July 23
Gold	Jeff Rouse	Swimming	Men's 100 meter backstroke	July 23
Gold	Josh Davis; David Fox*; Gary Hall Jr. Jon Olsen; Brad Schumacher; Scott Tucker	Swimming	Men's 4 × 100 meter freestyle relay	July 23
Gold	Amanda Beard; Beth Botsford; Catherine Fox*; Whitney Hedgepeth*; Angel Martino; Kristine Quance*; Jenny Thompson*; Amy Van Dyken	Swimming	Women's 4 × 100 meter medley relay	July 24
Gold	Brooke Bennett	Swimming	Women's 800 meter freestyle	July 25
Gold	Lisa Jacob*; Trina Jackson; Annette Salmeen*; Sheila Taormina; Cristina Teuscher; Jenny Thompson; Ashley Whitney*	Swimming	Women's 4 × 200 meter freestyle relay	July 25
Gold	Randy Barnes	Athletics	Men's shot put	July 26
Gold	Brad Bridgewater	Swimming	Men's 200 meter backstroke	July 26
Gold	Josh Davis*; Kurt Grote*; Gary Hall Jr. John Hargis*; Mark Henderson; Jeremy Linn; Jeff Rouse; Tripp Schwenk*	Swimming	Men's 4 × 100 meter medley relay	July 26
Gold	Amy Van Dyken	Swimming	Women's 50 meter freestyle	July 26
Gold	Kenny Harrison	Athletics	Men's triple jump	July 27
Gold	Gail Devers	Athletics	Women's 100 meters	July 27
Gold	Charles Austin	Athletics	Men's high jump	July 28
Gold	Karch Kiraly; Kent Steffes	Volleyball	Men's beach volleyball	July 28
Gold	Michael Johnson	Athletics	Men's 400 meters	July 29
Gold	Allen Johnson	Athletics	Men's 110 meter hurdles	July 29
Gold	Carl Lewis	Athletics	Men's long jump	July 29
Gold	Shannon Miller	Gymnastics	Women's balance beam	July 29
Gold	United States women's national softball team: Laura Berg; Gillian Boxx; Sheila Cornell; Lisa Fernandez; Michele Granger; Lori Harrigan; Dionna Harris; Kim Maher; Leah O'Brien-Amico; Dot Richardson; Julie Smith; Michele Smith; Shelly Stokes; Dani Tyler; Christa Williams	Softball	Women's tournament	July 30
Gold	Kendall Cross	Wrestling	Freestyle –57 kg	July 30
Gold	Kurt Angle	Wrestling	Freestyle –100 kg	July 30
Gold	United States women's national soccer team: Michelle Akers; Thori Staples Bryan; Brandi Chastain; Amanda Cromwell; Joy Fawcett; Julie Foudy; Carin Gabarra; Mia Hamm; Mary Harvey; Kristine Lilly; Shannon MacMillan; Tiffeny Milbrett; Carla Overbeck; Cindy Parlow; Tiffany Roberts; Briana Scurry; Tisha Venturini; Saskia Webber; Staci Wilson	Football	Women's tournament	July 31
Gold	Justin Huish	Archery	Men's individual	August 1
Gold	Michael Johnson	Athletics	Men's 200 meters	August 1
Gold	Derrick Adkins	Athletics	Men's 400 meter hurdles	August 1
Gold	Dan O'Brien	Athletics	Men's decathlon	August 1
Gold	Tom Brands	Wrestling	Freestyle –62 kg	August 1
Gold	Justin Huish; Richard Johnson; Rod White	Archery	Men's team	August 2
Gold	Suzannah Bianco; Tammy Cleland; Becky Dyroen-Lancer; Emily LeSueur; Heather Pease; Jill Savery; Nathalie Schneyder; Heather Simmons-Carrasco; Jill Sudduth; Margot Thien	Synchronized swimming	Team	August 2
Gold	Lindsay Davenport	Tennis	Women's singles	August 2
Gold	Alvin Harrison; Anthuan Maybank; Derek Mills; Jason Rouser*; LaMont Smith	Athletics	Men's 4 × 400 meter relay	August 3
Gold	Gail Devers; Chryste Gaines; Carlette Guidry*; Inger Miller; Gwen Torrence	Athletics	Women's 4 × 100 meter relay	August 3
Gold	Kim Graham; Maicel Malone; Jearl Miles; Rochelle Stevens; Linetta Wilson*	Athletics	Women's 4 × 400 meter relay	August 3
Gold	United States men's national basketball team: Charles Barkley; Penny Hardaway; Grant Hill; Karl Malone; Reggie Miller; Hakeem Olajuwon; Shaquille O'Neal; Gary Payton; Scottie Pippen; Mitch Richmond; David Robinson; John Stockton	Basketball	Men's tournament	August 3
Gold	Andre Agassi	Tennis	Men's singles	August 3
Gold	Gigi Fernández; Mary Joe Fernández	Tennis	Women's doubles	August 3
Gold	United States women's national basketball team: Jennifer Azzi; Ruthie Bolton; Teresa Edwards; Venus Lacy; Lisa Leslie; Rebecca Lobo; Katrina McClain; Nikki McCray; Carla McGhee; Dawn Staley; Katy Steding; Sheryl Swoopes	Basketball	Women's tournament	August 4
Gold	David Reid	Boxing	Light middleweight	August 4
Silver	Jeremy Linn	Swimming	Men's 100 meter breaststroke	July 20
Silver	Allison Wagner	Swimming	Women's 400 meter individual medley	July 20
Silver	Dennis Hall	Wrestling	Greco-Roman –57 kg	July 20
Silver	Josh Lakatos	Shooting	Men's trap	July 21
Silver	Eric Namesnik	Swimming	Men's 400 meter individual medley	July 21
Silver	Amanda Beard	Swimming	Women's 100 meter breaststroke	July 21
Silver	Gary Hall Jr.	Swimming	Men's 100 meter freestyle	July 22
Silver	Tom Malchow	Swimming	Men's 200 meter butterfly	July 22
Silver	Whitney Hedgepeth	Swimming	Women's 100 meter backstroke	July 22
Silver	Brandon Paulson	Wrestling	Greco-Roman –52 kg	July 22
Silver	Matt Ghaffari	Wrestling	Greco-Roman –130 kg	July 22
Silver	Amanda Beard	Swimming	Women's 200 meter breaststroke	July 23
Silver	Erin Hartwell	Cycling	Men's 1000 meter time trial	July 24
Silver	Bruce Davidson; Jill Henneberg; David O'Connor; Karen O'Connor	Equestrian	Team eventing	July 24
Silver	Gary Hall Jr.	Swimming	Men's 50 meter freestyle	July 25
Silver	Whitney Hedgepeth	Swimming	Women's 200 meter backstroke	July 25
Silver	John Godina	Athletics	Men's shot put	July 26
Silver	Tripp Schwenk	Swimming	Men's 200 meter backstroke	July 26
Silver	Dana Chladek	Canoeing	Women's slalom K-1	July 27
Silver	Karen Kraft; Missy Schwen	Rowing	Women's pair	July 27
Silver	Lance Deal	Athletics	Men's hammer throw	July 28
Silver	Marty Nothstein	Cycling	Men's sprint	July 28
Silver	Amy Chow	Gymnastics	Women's uneven bars	July 28
Silver	Teresa Bell; Lindsay Burns	Rowing	Women's lightweight double sculls	July 28
Silver	Mike Dodd; Mike Whitmarsh	Volleyball	Men's beach volleyball	July 28
Silver	Mark Crear	Athletics	Men's 110 meter hurdles	July 29
Silver	Jair Lynch	Gymnastics	Men's parallel bars	July 29
Silver	Jason Gailes; Brian Jamieson; Eric Mueller; Tim Young	Rowing	Men's quadruple sculls	July 29
Silver	Townsend Saunders	Wrestling	Freestyle –68 kg	July 30
Silver	Kim Batten	Athletics	Women's 400 meter hurdles	July 31
Silver	Leslie Burr; Anne Kursinski; Peter Leone; Michael Matz	Equestrian	Team jumping	August 1
Silver	Jon Drummond; Tim Harden; Michael Marsh; Dennis Mitchell; Tim Montgomery*	Athletics	Men's 4 × 100 meter relay	August 3
Bronze	Angel Martino	Swimming	Women's 100 meter freestyle	July 20
Bronze	Lance Bade	Shooting	Men's trap	July 21
Bronze	Angel Martino	Swimming	Women's 100 meter butterfly	July 21
Bronze	Jimmy Pedro	Judo	Men's –71 kg	July 24
Bronze	Kerry Milliken	Equestrian	Individual eventing	July 26
Bronze	Gwen Torrence	Athletics	Women's 100 meters	July 27
Bronze	Mary Ellen Clark	Diving	Women's 10 meter platform	July 27
Bronze	Robert Dover; Michelle Gibson; Steffen Peters; Guenter Seidel	Equestrian	Team dressage	July 27
Bronze	William Carlucci; David Collins; Jeff Pfaendtner; Marc Schneider	Rowing	Men's lightweight four	July 28
Bronze	Joe Greene	Athletics	Men's long jump	July 29
Bronze	Mark Lenzi	Diving	Men's 3 meter springboard	July 29
Bronze	Dominique Dawes	Gymnastics	Women's floor	July 29
Bronze	Susan DeMattei	Cycling	Women's cross-country	July 30
Bronze	Tonja Buford-Bailey	Athletics	Women's 400 meter hurdles	July 31
Bronze	Calvin Davis	Athletics	Men's 400 meter hurdles	August 1
Bronze	Bruce Baumgartner	Wrestling	Freestyle –130 kg	August 1
Bronze	Jackie Joyner-Kersee	Athletics	Women's long jump	August 2
Bronze	United States men's national baseball team: Chad Allen; Kris Benson; R. A. Dickey; Troy Glaus; Chad Green; Seth Greisinger; Kip Harkrider; A. J. Hinch; Jacque Jones; Billy Koch; Mark Kotsay; Matt Lecroy; Travis Lee; Braden Looper; Brian Loyd; Warren Morris; Augie Ojeda; Jim Parque; Jeff Weaver; Jason Williams	Baseball	Men's tournament	August 2
Bronze	Courtenay Becker-Day	Sailing	Women's Europe	August 2
Bronze	Jim Barton; Jeff Madrigali; Kent Massey	Sailing	Soling	August 2
Bronze	Floyd Mayweather Jr.	Boxing	Featherweight	August 4
Bronze	Terrance Cauthen	Boxing	Lightweight	August 4
Bronze	Rhoshii Wells	Boxing	Middleweight	August 4
Bronze	Antonio Tarver	Boxing	Light heavyweight	August 4
Bronze	Nate Jones	Boxing	Heavyweight	August 4

=== 2000 Sydney ===
Medal	Name	Sport	Event	Date
Gold	Nancy Johnson	Shooting	Women's 10 m air rifle	September 16
Gold	Erin Phenix*; Courtney Shealy; Ashley Tappin*; Jenny Thompson; Dara Torres; Amy Van Dyken	Swimming	Women's 4 × 100 m freestyle relay	September 16
Gold	Brooke Bennett	Swimming	Women's 400 m freestyle	September 17
Gold	Tara Nott	Weightlifting	Women's 48 kg	September 17
Gold	Lenny Krayzelburg	Swimming	Men's 100 m backstroke	September 18
Gold	Megan Quann	Swimming	Women's 100 m breaststroke	September 18
Gold	Tom Malchow	Swimming	Men's 200 m butterfly	September 19
Gold	Misty Hyman	Swimming	Women's 200 m butterfly	September 19
Gold	Samantha Arsenault; Lindsay Benko; Kim Black*; Diana Munz; Julia Stowers*; Jenny Thompson	Swimming	Women's 4 × 200 m freestyle relay	September 19
Gold	Marty Nothstein	Cycling	Men's sprint	September 20
Gold	Tom Dolan	Swimming	Men's 400 m medley	September 20
Gold	Lenny Krayzelburg	Swimming	Men's 200 m backstroke	September 21
Gold	David O'Connor	Equestrian	Individual Eventing	September 22
Gold	Anthony Ervin	Swimming	Men's 50 m freestyle	September 22
Gold	Gary Hall Jr.	Swimming	Men's 50 m freestyle	September 22
Gold	Brooke Bennett	Swimming	Women's 800 m freestyle	September 22
Gold	Barbara Bedford; Megan Quann; Courtney Shealy*; Staciana Stitts*; Ashley Tappin*; Jenny Thompson; Dara Torres; Amy Van Dyken*	Swimming	Women's 4 × 100 m medley relay	September 22
Gold	Maurice Greene	Athletics	Men's 100 m	September 23
Gold	Ian Crocker; Gary Hall Jr. Tommy Hannan*; Lenny Krayzelburg; Jason Lezak*; Ed Moses; Neil Walker*	Swimming	Men's 4 × 100 m medley relay	September 23
Gold	Laura Wilkinson	Diving	Women's platform	September 24
Gold	Michael Johnson	Athletics	Men's 400 m	September 25
Gold	Stacy Dragila	Athletics	Women's pole vault	September 25
Gold	United States women's national softball team: Christie Ambrosi; Laura Berg; Jennifer Brundage; Crystl Bustos; Sheila Cornell; Lisa Fernandez; Lori Harrigan; Danielle Henderson; Jennifer McFalls; Stacey Nuveman; Leah O'Brien; Dot Richardson; Michele Mary Smith; Michelle Venturella; Christa Lee Williams	Softball	Women's tournament	September 25
Gold	Dain Blanton; Eric Fonoimoana	Volleyball	Men's beach	September 26
Gold	Angelo Taylor	Athletics	Men's 400 m hurdles	September 27
Gold	United States national baseball team: Brent Abernathy; Kurt Ainsworth; Pat Borders; Sean Burroughs; John Cotton; Travis Dawkins; Adam Everett; Ryan Franklin; Chris George; Shane Heams; Marcus Jensen; Mike Kinkade; Rick Krivda; Doug Mientkiewicz; Mike Neill; Roy Oswalt; Jon Rauch; Anthony Sanders; Bobby Seay; Ben Sheets; Brad Wilkerson; Todd Williams; Ernie Young; Tim Young	Baseball	Men's tournament	September 27
Gold	Serena Williams; Venus Williams	Tennis	Women's doubles	September 27
Gold	Rulon Gardner	Wrestling	Men's Greco-Roman 130 kg	September 27
Gold	Steven López	Taekwondo	Men's 68 kg	September 28
Gold	Venus Williams	Tennis	Women's singles	September 28
Gold	Nick Hysong	Athletics	Men's pole vault	September 29
Gold	Kenneth Brokenburr*; Jon Drummond; Maurice Greene; Brian Lewis; Tim Montgomery*; Bernard Williams	Athletics	Men's 4 × 100 m relay	September 30
Gold	Andrea Anderson*; LaTasha Colander; Monique Hennagan; Jearl Miles Clark^{[a]}	Athletics	Women's 4 × 400 m relay	September 30
Gold	United States women's national basketball team: Ruthie Bolton; Teresa Edwards; Yolanda Griffith; Chamique Holdsclaw; Lisa Leslie; Nikki McCray; DeLisha Milton-Jones; Katie Smith; Dawn Staley; Sheryl Swoopes; Natalie Williams; Kara Wolters	Basketball	Women's tournament	September 30
Gold	Magnus Liljedahl; Mark Reynolds	Sailing	Star class	September 30
Gold	Brandon Slay	Wrestling	Men's freestyle 76 kg	September 30
Gold	United States men's national basketball team: Shareef Abdur-Rahim; Ray Allen; Vin Baker; Vince Carter; Kevin Garnett; Tim Hardaway; Allan Houston; Jason Kidd; Antonio McDyess; Alonzo Mourning; Gary Payton; Steve Smith	Basketball	Men's tournament	October 1
Silver	Josh Davis*; Anthony Ervin; Gary Hall Jr. Jason Lezak; Scott Tucker*; Neil Walker	Swimming	Men's 4 × 100 m freestyle relay	September 16
Silver	Ed Moses	Swimming	Men's 100 m breaststroke	September 17
Silver	Diana Munz	Swimming	Women's 400 m freestyle	September 17
Silver	Chad Carvin*; Josh Davis; Nate Dusing*; Scott Goldblatt; Klete Keller; Jamie Rauch	Swimming	Men's 4 × 200 m freestyle relay	September 19
Silver	Vic Wunderle	Archery	Men's individual	September 20
Silver	Tom Dolan	Swimming	Men's 200 m individual medley	September 20
Silver	Erik Vendt	Swimming	Men's 400 m individual medley	September 20
Silver	Kristy Kowal	Swimming	Women's 200 m breaststroke	September 20
Silver	Aaron Peirsol	Swimming	Men's 200 m backstroke	September 21
Silver	Adam Nelson	Athletics	Men's shot put	September 22
Silver	Sebastian Bea; Edward Murphy	Rowing	Men's pair	September 23
Silver	United States women's national water polo team: Robin Beauregard; Ellen Estes; Courtney Johnson; Ericka Lorenz; Heather Moody; Maureen O'Toole; Bernice Orwig; Nicolle Payne; Heather Petri; Kathy Sheehy; Coralie Simmons; Julie Swail; Brenda Villa	Water polo	Women's tournament	September 23
Silver	Alvin Harrison	Athletics	Men's 400 m	September 24
Silver	Terrence Trammell	Athletics	Men's 110 m hurdles	September 25
Silver	Matt Lindland	Wrestling	Men's Greco-Roman 76 kg	September 26
Silver	United States women's national soccer team: Brandi Chastain; Lorrie Fair; Joy Fawcett; Julie Foudy; Michelle French; Mia Hamm; Kristine Lilly; Shannon MacMillan; Tiffeny Milbrett; Siri Mullinix; Carla Overbeck; Cindy Parlow; Christie Rampone; Briana Scurry; Nikki Serlenga; Danielle Slaton; Kate Sobrero; Sara Whalen	Football	Women's tournament	September 28
Silver	Paul Foerster; Robert Merrick	Sailing	Men's 470	September 28
Silver	J. J. Isler; Sarah Glaser	Sailing	Women's 470	September 28
Silver	Lawrence Johnson	Athletics	Men's pole vault	September 29
Silver	Mari Holden	Cycling	Women's road time trial	September 30
Silver	Sammie Henson	Wrestling	Men's freestyle 54 kg	September 30
Silver	Rocky Juarez	Boxing	Featherweight	October 1
Silver	Ricardo Williams	Boxing	Light Welterweight	October 1
Silver	Emily de Riel	Modern pentathlon	Women's event	October 1
Bronze	Klete Keller	Swimming	Men's 400 m freestyle	September 16
Bronze	Dara Torres	Swimming	Women's 100 m butterfly	September 17
Bronze	Nina Fout; David O'Connor; Karen O'Connor; Linden Wiesman	Equestrian	Eventing Team	September 19
Bronze	Amy Chow; Jamie Dantzscher; Dominique Dawes; Kristen Maloney; Elise Ray; Tasha Schwikert^{[b]}	Gymnastics	Women's artistic team all-around	September 19
Bronze	Kim Rhode	Shooting	Women's double trap	September 19
Bronze	Cristina Teuscher	Swimming	Women's 200 m individual medley	September 19
Bronze	Gary Hall Jr.	Swimming	Men's 100 m freestyle	September 20
Bronze	Tom Wilkens	Swimming	Men's 200 m individual medley	September 20
Bronze	Jenny Thompson	Swimming	Women's 100 m freestyle	September 20
Bronze	Dara Torres	Swimming	Women's 100 m freestyle	September 20
Bronze	Amanda Beard	Swimming	Women's 200 m breaststroke	September 20
Bronze	Butch Johnson; Rod White; Vic Wunderle	Archery	Men's team	September 22
Bronze	John Godina	Athletics	Men's shot put	September 22
Bronze	Kaitlin Sandeno	Swimming	Women's 800 m freestyle	September 22
Bronze	Cheryl Haworth	Weightlifting	Women's +75 kg	September 22
Bronze	Karen Kraft; Missy Schwen-Ryan	Rowing	Women's pair	September 23
Bronze	James Graves	Shooting	Men's skeet	September 23
Bronze	Chris Thompson	Swimming	Men's 1500 m freestyle	September 23
Bronze	Dara Torres	Swimming	Women's 50 m freestyle	September 23
Bronze	Christine Collins; Sarah Garner	Rowing	Women's lightweight double sculls	September 24
Bronze	Mark Crear	Athletics	Men's 110 m hurdles	September 25
Bronze	Charles McKee; Jonathan McKee	Sailing	49er	September 25
Bronze	Susan Blinks; Robert Dover; Guenter Seidel; Christine Traurig	Equestrian	Dressage Team	September 26
Bronze	Garrett Lowney	Wrestling	Men's Greco-Roman 97 kg	September 26
Bronze	Melissa Morrison	Athletics	Women's 100 m hurdles	September 27
Bronze	Chris Huffins	Athletics	Men's decathlon	September 28
Bronze	Clarence Vinson	Boxing	Bantamweight	September 28
Bronze	Monica Seles	Tennis	Women's singles	September 28
Bronze	Jermain Taylor	Boxing	Light middleweight	September 29
Bronze	Chryste Gaines; Torri Edwards; Nanceen Perry; Passion Richardson*^{[a]}	Athletics	Women's 4 × 100 m relay	September 30
Bronze	Terry Brands	Wrestling	Men's freestyle 58 kg	October 1
Bronze	Lincoln McIlravy	Wrestling	Men's freestyle 69 kg	October 1

=== 2004 Athens ===
Medal	Name	Sport	Event	Date
Gold	Michael Phelps	Swimming	Men's 400 m individual medley	August 14
Gold	Aaron Peirsol	Swimming	Men's 100 m backstroke	August 16
Gold	Natalie Coughlin	Swimming	Women's 100 m backstroke	August 16
Gold	Mariel Zagunis	Fencing	Women's sabre	August 17
Gold	Michael Phelps	Swimming	Men's 200 m butterfly	August 17
Gold	Scott Goldblatt*; Klete Keller; Dan Ketchum*; Ryan Lochte; Michael Phelps; Peter Vanderkaay	Swimming	Men's 4 × 200 m freestyle relay	August 17
Gold	Adam Nelson	Athletics	Men's shot put	August 18
Gold	Paul Hamm	Gymnastics	Men's artistic individual all-around	August 18
Gold	Kimberly Rhode	Shooting	Women's double trap	August 18
Gold	Lindsay Benko*; Natalie Coughlin; Rhi Jeffrey*; Rachel Komisarz*; Carly Piper; Kaitlin Sandeno; Dana Vollmer	Swimming	Women's 4 × 200 m freestyle relay	August 18
Gold	Carly Patterson	Gymnastics	Women's artistic individual all-around	August 19
Gold	Aaron Peirsol	Swimming	Men's 200 m backstroke	August 19
Gold	Michael Phelps	Swimming	Men's 200 m individual medley	August 19
Gold	Amanda Beard	Swimming	Women's 200 m breaststroke	August 19
Gold	Matthew Emmons	Shooting	Men's 50 m rifle prone	August 20
Gold	Gary Hall Jr.	Swimming	Men's 50 m freestyle	August 20
Gold	Michael Phelps	Swimming	Men's 100 m butterfly	August 20
Gold	Ian Crocker; Mark Gangloff*; Brendan Hansen; Lenny Krayzelburg*; Jason Lezak; Aaron Peirsol; Michael Phelps*; Neil Walker*	Swimming	Men's 4 × 100 m medley relay	August 21
Gold	Justin Gatlin	Athletics	Men's 100 m	August 22
Gold	Chris Ahrens; Wyatt Allen; Dan Beery; Peter Cipollone (cox); Matt Deakin; Joseph Hansen; Beau Hoopman; Jason Read; Bryan Volpenhein	Rowing	Men's eight	August 22
Gold	Jeremy Wariner	Athletics	Men's 400 m	August 23
Gold	Chris Kappler; Beezie Madden; McLain Ward; Peter Wylde	Equestrian	Team jumping	August 24
Gold	Misty May; Kerri Walsh	Volleyball	Women's beach volleyball	August 24
Gold	United States women's national softball team: Leah Amico; Laura Berg; Crystl Bustos; Lisa Fernandez; Jennie Finch; Tairia Flowers; Amanda Freed; Lori Harrigan; Lovieanne Jung; Kelly Kretschman; Jessica Mendoza; Stacey Nuveman; Cat Osterman; Jenny Topping; Natasha Watley	Softball	Women's tournament	August 23
Gold	Shawn Crawford	Athletics	Men's 200 m	August 26
Gold	Dwight Phillips	Athletics	Men's long jump	August 26
Gold	Joanna Hayes	Athletics	Women's 100 m hurdles	August 26
Gold	United States women's national soccer team: Shannon Boxx; Brandi Chastain; Joy Fawcett; Julie Foudy; Mia Hamm; Angela Hucles; Kristine Lilly; Kristin Luckenbill; Kate Markgraf; Heather Mitts; Heather O'Reilly; Cindy Parlow; Christie Rampone; Briana Scurry; Lindsay Tarpley; Aly Wagner; Abby Wambach; Cat Whitehill	Football	Women's tournament	August 26
Gold	Timothy Mack	Athletics	Men's pole vault	August 27
Gold	Steven López	Taekwondo	Men's 80 kg	August 27
Gold	Derrick Brew; Otis Harris; Andrew Rock*; Jeremy Wariner; Darold Williamson; Kelly Willie*	Athletics	Men's 4 × 400 m relay	August 28
Gold	Monique Henderson; Monique Hennagan; Moushaumi Robinson*; Sanya Richards; Dee Dee Trotter	Athletics	Women's 4 × 400 m relay	August 28
Gold	United States women's national basketball team: Sue Bird; Swin Cash; Tamika Catchings; Yolanda Griffith; Shannon Johnson; Lisa Leslie; Ruth Riley; Katie Smith; Dawn Staley; Sheryl Swoopes; Diana Taurasi; Tina Thompson	Basketball	Women's tournament	August 28
Gold	Kevin Burnham; Paul Foerster	Sailing	Men's 470 class	August 28
Gold	Cael Sanderson	Wrestling	Men's freestyle 84 kg	August 28
Gold	Andre Ward	Boxing	Light heavyweight	August 29
Silver	Erik Vendt	Swimming	Men's 400 m individual medley	August 14
Silver	Kaitlin Sandeno	Swimming	Women's 400 m individual medley	August 14
Silver	Lindsay Benko*; Maritza Correia*; Natalie Coughlin; Kara Lynn Joyce; Colleen Lanne*; Jenny Thompson; Amanda Weir	Swimming	Women's 4 × 100 m freestyle relay	August 14
Silver	Brendan Hansen	Swimming	Men's 100 m breaststroke	August 15
Silver	Jason Gatson; Morgan Hamm; Paul Hamm; Brett McClure; Blaine Wilson; Guard Young	Gymnastics	Men's artistic team all-around	August 16
Silver	Mohini Bhardwaj; Annia Hatch; Terin Humphrey; Courtney Kupets; Courtney McCool; Carly Patterson	Gymnastics	Women's artistic team all-around	August 17
Silver	Amanda Beard	Swimming	Women's 200 m individual medley	August 17
Silver	Rebecca Giddens	Canoeing	Women's slalom K-1	August 18
Silver	Bobby Julich	Cycling	Men's road time trial	August 18
Silver	Dede Barry	Cycling	Women's road time trial	August 18
Silver	Kimberly Severson	Equestrian	Individual eventing	August 18
Silver	Ryan Lochte	Swimming	Men's 200 m individual medley	August 19
Silver	Ian Crocker	Swimming	Men's 100 m butterfly	August 20
Silver	Lauryn Williams	Athletics	Women's 100 m	August 21
Silver	Larsen Jensen	Swimming	Men's 1500 m freestyle	August 21
Silver	Amanda Beard; Haley Cope*; Natalie Coughlin; Kara Lynn Joyce; Tara Kirk*; Rachel Komisarz*; Jenny Thompson; Amanda Weir*	Swimming	Women's 4 × 100 m medley relay	August 21
Silver	Matt Hemingway	Athletics	Men's high jump	August 22
Silver	Terin Humphrey	Gymnastics	Women's uneven bars	August 22
Silver	Annia Hatch	Gymnastics	Women's vault	August 22
Silver	Alison Cox; Caryn Davies; Megan Dirkmaat; Kate Johnson; Laurel Korholz; Samantha Magee; Anna Mickelson; Lianne Nelson; Mary Whipple (cox)	Rowing	Women's eight	August 22
Silver	Michael Anti	Shooting	Men's 50 m rifle three positions	August 22
Silver	Mardy Fish	Tennis	Men's singles	August 22
Silver	Otis Harris	Athletics	Men's 400 m	August 23
Silver	Paul Hamm	Gymnastics	Men's horizontal bar	August 23
Silver	Carly Patterson	Gymnastics	Women's balance beam	August 23
Silver	Sara McMann	Wrestling	Women's freestyle 63 kg	August 23
Silver	Bryan Clay	Athletics	Men's decathlon	August 24
Silver	Allyson Felix	Athletics	Women's 200 m	August 25
Silver	Bernard Williams	Athletics	Men's 200 m	August 26
Silver	John Moffitt	Athletics	Men's long jump	August 26
Silver	Nia Abdallah	Taekwondo	Women's 57 kg	August 26
Silver	Terrence Trammell	Athletics	Men's 110 m hurdles	August 27
Silver	Toby Stevenson	Athletics	Men's pole vault	August 27
Silver	Chris Kappler	Equestrian	Individual jumping	August 27
Silver	Shawn Crawford; Justin Gatlin; Maurice Greene; Coby Miller; Darvis Patton*	Athletics	Men's 4 × 100 m relay	August 28
Silver	John C. Lovell; Charlie Ogletree	Sailing	Tornado class	August 28
Silver	Stephen Abas	Wrestling	Men's freestyle 55 kg	August 28
Silver	Jamill Kelly	Wrestling	Men's freestyle 66 kg	August 28
Silver	Meb Keflezighi	Athletics	Men's marathon	August 29
Bronze	Klete Keller	Swimming	Men's 400 m freestyle	August 14
Bronze	Kaitlin Sandeno	Swimming	Women's 400 m freestyle	August 15
Bronze	Ian Crocker; Nate Dusing*; Gary Hall Jr.* Jason Lezak; Michael Phelps; Neil Walker; Gabe Woodward*	Swimming	Men's 4 × 100 m freestyle relay	August 15
Bronze	Jimmy Pedro	Judo	Men's 73 kg	August 16
Bronze	Michael Phelps	Swimming	Men's 200 m freestyle	August 16
Bronze	Sada Jacobson	Fencing	Women's sabre	August 17
Bronze	Darren Chiacchia; Julie Richards; Kimberly Severson; Amy Tryon; John Williams	Equestrian	Team eventing	August 18
Bronze	Brendan Hansen	Swimming	Men's 200 m breaststroke	August 18
Bronze	Natalie Coughlin	Swimming	Women's 100 m freestyle	August 19
Bronze	Diana Munz	Swimming	Women's 800 m freestyle	August 20
Bronze	Robert Dover; Debbie McDonald; Guenter Seidel; Lisa Wilcox	Equestrian	Team dressage	August 21
Bronze	Maurice Greene	Athletics	Men's 100 m	August 22
Bronze	Deena Kastor	Athletics	Women's marathon	August 22
Bronze	Courtney Kupets	Gymnastics	Women's uneven bars	August 22
Bronze	Derrick Brew	Athletics	Men's 400 m	August 23
Bronze	Patricia Miranda	Wrestling	Women's freestyle 48 kg	August 23
Bronze	Melissa Morrison	Athletics	Women's 100 m hurdles	August 24
Bronze	Holly McPeak; Elaine Youngs	Volleyball	Women's beach volleyball	August 24
Bronze	Alison Bartosik; Anna Kozlova	Synchronized swimming	Women's duet	August 25
Bronze	Susan Williams	Triathlon	Women's event	August 25
Bronze	Rulon Gardner	Wrestling	Men's Greco-Roman 120 kg	August 25
Bronze	Justin Gatlin	Athletics	Men's 200 m	August 26
Bronze	United States women's national water polo team: Robin Beauregard; Margaret Dingeldein; Ellen Estes; Jacqueline Frank; Natalie Golda; Ericka Lorenz; Heather Moody; Thalia Munro; Nicolle Payne; Heather Petri; Kelly Rulon; Amber Stachowski; Brenda Villa	Water polo	Women's tournament	August 26
Bronze	Andre Dirrell	Boxing	Middleweight	August 27
Bronze	Alison Bartosik; Tamara Crow; Erin Dobratz; Rebecca Jasontek; Anna Kozlova; Sara Lowe; Lauren McFall; Stephanie Nesbitt; Kendra Zanotto	Synchronized swimming	Women's team	August 27
Bronze	United States men's national basketball team: Carmelo Anthony; Carlos Boozer; Tim Duncan; Allen Iverson; LeBron James; Richard Jefferson; Stephon Marbury; Shawn Marion; Lamar Odom; Emeka Okafor; Amar'e Stoudemire; Dwyane Wade	Basketball	Men's tournament	August 28

=== 2008 Beijing ===
Medal	Name	Sport	Event	Date
Gold	Mariel Zagunis	Fencing	Women's sabre	August 9
Gold	Michael Phelps	Swimming	Men's 400 m individual medley	August 10
Gold	Nathan Adrian*; Matt Grevers*; Cullen Jones; Jason Lezak; Michael Phelps; Garrett Weber-Gale; Ben Wildman-Tobriner*	Swimming	Men's 4 × 100 m freestyle relay	August 11
Gold	Michael Phelps	Swimming	Men's 200 m freestyle	August 12
Gold	Natalie Coughlin	Swimming	Women's 100 m backstroke	August 12
Gold	Aaron Peirsol	Swimming	Men's 100 m backstroke	August 12
Gold	Walton Eller	Shooting	Men's double trap	August 12
Gold	Michael Phelps	Swimming	Men's 200 m butterfly	August 13
Gold	Ricky Berens; Klete Keller*; Ryan Lochte; Michael Phelps; Peter Vanderkaay; Erik Vendt*; David Walters*	Swimming	Men's 4 × 200 m freestyle relay	August 13
Gold	Kristin Armstrong	Cycling	Women's time trial	August 13
Gold	Rebecca Soni	Swimming	Women's 200 m breaststroke	August 15
Gold	Ryan Lochte	Swimming	Men's 200 m backstroke	August 15
Gold	Michael Phelps	Swimming	Men's 200 m individual medley	August 15
Gold	Nastia Liukin	Gymnastics	Women's artistic individual all-around	August 15
Gold	Michael Phelps	Swimming	Men's 100 m butterfly	August 16
Gold	Vincent Hancock	Shooting	Men's skeet	August 16
Gold	Ian Crocker*; Mark Gangloff*; Matt Grevers*; Brendan Hansen; Jason Lezak; Aaron Peirsol; Michael Phelps; Garrett Weber-Gale*	Swimming	Men's 4 × 100 m medley relay	August 17
Gold	Serena Williams; Venus Williams	Tennis	Women's doubles	August 17
Gold	Erin Cafaro; Anna Cummins; Caryn Davies; Susan Francia; Anna Goodale; Caroline Lind; Elle Logan; Lindsay Shoop; Mary Whipple	Rowing	Women's eight	August 17
Gold	Stephanie Brown Trafton	Track & field	Women's discus throw	August 18
Gold	Angelo Taylor	Track & field	Men's 400 m hurdles	August 18
Gold	Laura Kraut; Beezie Madden; Will Simpson; McLain Ward	Equestrian	Team jumping	August 18
Gold	Anna Tunnicliffe	Sailing	Women's Laser Radial class	August 19
Gold	Henry Cejudo	Wrestling	Men's freestyle 55 kg	August 19
Gold	Shawn Johnson	Gymnastics	Women's balance beam	August 19
Gold	Dawn Harper	Track & field	Women's 100 m hurdles	August 19
Gold	Misty May-Treanor; Kerri Walsh	Beach volleyball	Women's tournament	August 21
Gold	LaShawn Merritt	Track & field	Men's 400 m	August 21
Gold	United States women's national soccer team: Nicole Barnhart; Shannon Boxx; Rachel Buehler; Lori Chalupny; Lauren Cheney; Stephanie Cox; Tobin Heath; Angela Hucles; Natasha Kai; Carli Lloyd; Kate Markgraf; Heather Mitts; Heather O'Reilly; Christie Rampone; Amy Rodriguez; Hope Solo; Lindsay Tarpley; Aly Wagner	Football	Women's tournament	August 21
Gold	Phil Dalhausser; Todd Rogers	Beach volleyball	Men's tournament	August 22
Gold	Bryan Clay	Track & field	Men's decathlon	August 22
Gold	Kerron Clement*; LaShawn Merritt; David Neville; Angelo Taylor; Jeremy Wariner; Reggie Witherspoon*	Track & field	Men's 4 × 400 m relay	August 23
Gold	Allyson Felix; Natasha Hastings*; Monique Henderson; Sanya Richards; Mary Wineberg	Track & field	Women's 4 × 400 m relay	August 23
Gold	United States women's national basketball team: Seimone Augustus; Sue Bird; Tamika Catchings; Sylvia Fowles; Kara Lawson; Lisa Leslie; DeLisha Milton-Jones; Candace Parker; Cappie Pondexter; Katie Smith; Diana Taurasi; Tina Thompson	Basketball	Women's tournament	August 23
Gold	United States men's national volleyball team: Lloy Ball; Gabriel Gardner; Kevin Hansen; Tom Hoff; Rich Lambourne; David Lee; Ryan Millar; Reid Priddy; Sean Rooney; Riley Salmon; Clay Stanley; Scott Touzinsky	Volleyball	Men's tournament	August 24
Gold	United States men's national basketball team: Carmelo Anthony; Carlos Boozer; Chris Bosh; Kobe Bryant; Dwight Howard; LeBron James; Jason Kidd; Chris Paul; Tayshaun Prince; Michael Redd; Dwyane Wade; Deron Williams	Basketball	Men's tournament	August 24
Silver	Sada Jacobson	Fencing	Women's sabre	August 9
Silver	Natalie Coughlin; Kara Lynn Joyce; Lacey Nymeyer; Emily Silver*; Julia Smit*; Dara Torres	Swimming	Women's 4 × 100 m freestyle relay	August 10
Silver	Christine Magnuson	Swimming	Women's 100 m butterfly	August 11
Silver	Katie Hoff	Swimming	Women's 400 m freestyle	August 11
Silver	Matt Grevers	Swimming	Men's 100 m backstroke	August 12
Silver	Rebecca Soni	Swimming	Women's 100 m breaststroke	August 12
Silver	Gina Miles	Equestrian	Individual eventing	August 12
Silver	Shawn Johnson; Nastia Liukin; Chellsie Memmel; Samantha Peszek; Alicia Sacramone; Bridget Sloan	Gymnastics	Women's artistic team all-around	August 13
Silver	Kimberly Rhode	Shooting	Women's skeet	August 14
Silver	Aaron Peirsol	Swimming	Men's 200 m backstroke	August 15
Silver	Matthew Emmons	Shooting	Men's 50 m rifle prone	August 15
Silver	Shawn Johnson	Gymnastics	Women's artistic individual all-around	August 15
Silver	Christian Cantwell	Track & field	Men's shot put	August 15
Silver	Margaret Hoelzer	Swimming	Women's 200 m backstroke	August 16
Silver	Michelle Guérette	Rowing	Women's single sculls	August 16
Silver	Emily Cross; Erinn Smart; Hanna Thompson	Fencing	Women's team foil	August 16
Silver	Hyleas Fountain	Track & field	Women's heptathlon	August 16
Silver	Dara Torres	Swimming	Women's 50 m freestyle	August 17
Silver	Elaine Breeden*; Natalie Coughlin; Margaret Hoelzer*; Megan Jendrick*; Kara Lynn Joyce*; Christine Magnuson; Rebecca Soni; Dara Torres	Swimming	Women's 4 × 100 m medley relay	August 17
Silver	Zach Railey	Sailing	Finn class	August 17
Silver	Tim Morehouse; Jason Rogers; Keeth Smart; James Williams	Fencing	Men's team sabre	August 17
Silver	Shawn Johnson	Gymnastics	Women's floor	August 17
Silver	Kerron Clement	Track & field	Men's 400 m hurdles	August 18
Silver	Nastia Liukin	Gymnastics	Women's uneven bars	August 18
Silver	Jennifer Stuczynski	Track & field	Women's pole vault	August 18
Silver	Nastia Liukin	Gymnastics	Women's balance beam	August 19
Silver	Jonathan Horton	Gymnastics	Men's horizontal bar	August 19
Silver	Sheena Tosta	Track & field	Women's 400 m hurdles	August 20
Silver	Shawn Crawford	Track & field	Men's 200 m	August 20
Silver	United States women's national water polo team: Elizabeth Armstrong; Patty Cardenas; Kami Craig; Natalie Golda; Alison Gregorka; Brittany Hayes; Jaime Hipp; Heather Petri; Jessica Steffens; Moriah van Norman; Brenda Villa; Lauren Wenger; Elsie Windes	Water polo	Women's tournament	August 21
Silver	United States women's national softball team: Monica Abbott; Laura Berg; Crystl Bustos; Andrea Duran; Jennie Finch; Tairia Flowers; Victoria Galindo; Lovieanne Jung; Kelly Kretschman; Lauren Lappin; Caitlin Lowe; Jessica Mendoza; Stacey Nuveman; Cat Osterman; Natasha Watley	Softball	Women's tournament	August 21
Silver	Allyson Felix	Track & field	Women's 200 m	August 21
Silver	Mark Lopez	Taekwondo	Men's 68 kg	August 21
Silver	Jeremy Wariner	Track & field	Men's 400 m	August 21
Silver	David Payne	Track & field	Men's 110 m hurdles	August 21
Silver	Mike Day	Cycling	Men's BMX	August 22
Silver	United States women's national volleyball team: Robyn Ah Mow-Santos; Lindsey Berg; Heather Bown; Nicole Davis; Kim Glass; Tayyiba Haneef-Park; Jennifer Joines; Ogonna Nnamani; Danielle Scott-Arruda; Stacy Sykora; Logan Tom; Kim Willoughby	Volleyball	Women's tournament	August 23
Silver	United States men's national water polo team: Tony Azevedo; Ryan Bailey; Layne Beaubien; Brandon Brooks; Peter Hudnut; Tim Hutten; J. W. Krumpholz; Rick Merlo; Merrill Moses; Jeff Powers; Jesse Smith; Peter Varellas; Adam Wright	Water polo	Men's tournament	August 24
Silver	Shalane Flanagan	Track & field	Women's 10000 m	August 15
Bronze	Jason Turner	Shooting	Men's 10 m air pistol	August 9
Bronze	Rebecca Ward	Fencing	Women's sabre	August 9
Bronze	Ryan Lochte	Swimming	Men's 400 m individual medley	August 10
Bronze	Larsen Jensen	Swimming	Men's 400 m freestyle	August 10
Bronze	Katie Hoff	Swimming	Women's 400 m individual medley	August 10
Bronze	Corey Cogdell	Shooting	Women's trap	August 11
Bronze	Peter Vanderkaay	Swimming	Men's 200 m freestyle	August 12
Bronze	Margaret Hoelzer	Swimming	Women's 100 m backstroke	August 12
Bronze	Alexander Artemev; Raj Bhavsar; Joe Hagerty; Jonathan Horton; Justin Spring; Kevin Tan	Gymnastics	Men's artistic team all-around	August 12
Bronze	Natalie Coughlin	Swimming	Women's 200 m individual medley	August 13
Bronze	Levi Leipheimer	Cycling	Men's time trial	August 13
Bronze	Ronda Rousey	Judo	Women's 70 kg	August 13
Bronze	Jason Lezak	Swimming	Men's 100 m freestyle	August 14
Bronze	Caroline Burckle; Natalie Coughlin; Katie Hoff; Christine Marshall*; Allison Schmitt; Julia Smit*; Kim Vandenberg*	Swimming	Women's 4 × 200 m freestyle relay	August 14
Bronze	Sada Jacobson; Rebecca Ward; Mariel Zagunis	Fencing	Women's team sabre	August 14
Bronze	Adam Wheeler	Wrestling	Men's Greco-Roman 96 kg	August 14
Bronze	Ryan Lochte	Swimming	Men's 200 m individual medley	August 15
Bronze	Natalie Coughlin	Swimming	Women's 100 m freestyle	August 15
Bronze	Bob Bryan; Mike Bryan	Tennis	Men's doubles	August 16
Bronze	Walter Dix	Track & field	Men's 100 m	August 16
Bronze	Randi Miller	Wrestling	Women's freestyle 63 kg	August 17
Bronze	Wyatt Allen; Micah Boyd; Steven Coppola; Beau Hoopman; Josh Inman; Marcus McElhenney; Matt Schnobrich; Bryan Volpenhein; Daniel Walsh	Rowing	Men's eight	August 17
Bronze	Nastia Liukin	Gymnastics	Women's floor	August 17
Bronze	Bershawn Jackson	Track & field	Men's 400 meter hurdles	August 18
Bronze	Sanya Richards	Track & field	Women's 400 meters	August 19
Bronze	Walter Dix	Track & field	Men's 200 meters	August 20
Bronze	Diana Lopez	Taekwondo	Women's 57 kg	August 21
Bronze	David Neville	Track & field	Men's 400 m	August 21
Bronze	David Oliver	Track & field	Men's 110 m hurdles	August 21
Bronze	Beezie Madden	Equestrian	Individual jumping	August 21
Bronze	Derek Miles	Track & field	Men's pole vault	August 22
Bronze	Jill Kintner	Cycling	Women's BMX	August 22
Bronze	Donny Robinson	Cycling	Men's BMX	August 22
Bronze	Deontay Wilder	Boxing	Heavyweight	August 22
Bronze	Steven López	Taekwondo	Men's 80 kg	August 22
Bronze	United States national baseball team: Brett Anderson; Jake Arrieta; Brian Barden; Matthew Brown; Trevor Cahill; Jeremy Cummings; Jason Donald; Brian Duensing; Dexter Fowler; John Gall; Mike Hessman; Kevin Jepsen; Brandon Knight; Mike Koplove; Matthew LaPorta; Lou Marson; Blaine Neal; Jayson Nix; Nate Schierholtz; Jeff Stevens; Stephen Strasburg; Taylor Teagarden; Terry Tiffee; Casey Weathers	Baseball	Men's tournament	August 23
Bronze	Chaunte Howard	Track & field	Women's high jump	August 23

=== 2012 London ===
Medal	Name	Sport	Event	Date
Gold	Ryan Lochte	Swimming	Men's 400 m individual medley	July 28
Gold	Kim Rhode	Shooting	Women's skeet	July 29
Gold	Dana Vollmer	Swimming	Women's 100 m butterfly	July 29
Gold	Matt Grevers	Swimming	Men's 100 m backstroke	July 30
Gold	Missy Franklin	Swimming	Women's 100 m backstroke	July 30
Gold	Gabby Douglas; McKayla Maroney; Aly Raisman; Kyla Ross; Jordyn Wieber	Gymnastics	Women's artistic team all-around	July 31
Gold	Vincent Hancock	Shooting	Men's skeet	July 31
Gold	Ricky Berens; Conor Dwyer; Charlie Houchin*; Ryan Lochte; Matt McLean*; Michael Phelps; Davis Tarwater*	Swimming	Men's 4 × 200 m freestyle relay	July 31
Gold	Allison Schmitt	Swimming	Women's 200 m freestyle	July 31
Gold	Kristin Armstrong	Cycling	Women's time trial	August 1
Gold	Nathan Adrian	Swimming	Men's 100 m freestyle	August 1
Gold	Alyssa Anderson*; Missy Franklin; Lauren Perdue*; Allison Schmitt; Dana Vollmer; Shannon Vreeland	Swimming	Women's 4 × 200 m freestyle relay	August 1
Gold	Gabby Douglas	Gymnastics	Women's artistic individual all-around	August 2
Gold	Kayla Harrison	Judo	Women's 78 kg	August 2
Gold	Erin Cafaro; Caryn Davies; Susan Francia; Caroline Lind; Esther Lofgren; Elle Logan; Meghan Musnicki; Taylor Ritzel; Mary Whipple	Rowing	Women's eight	August 2
Gold	Tyler Clary	Swimming	Men's 200 m backstroke	August 2
Gold	Michael Phelps	Swimming	Men's 200 m individual medley	August 2
Gold	Rebecca Soni	Swimming	Women's 200 m breaststroke	August 2
Gold	Michael Phelps	Swimming	Men's 100 m butterfly	August 3
Gold	Katie Ledecky	Swimming	Women's 800 m freestyle	August 3
Gold	Missy Franklin	Swimming	Women's 200 m backstroke	August 3
Gold	Jamie Lynn Gray	Shooting	Women's 50 m rifle 3 positions	August 4
Gold	Nathan Adrian; Matt Grevers; Brendan Hansen; Cullen Jones*; Tyler McGill*; Michael Phelps; Eric Shanteau*; Nick Thoman*	Swimming	Men's 4 × 100 m medley relay	August 4
Gold	Rachel Bootsma*; Claire Donahue*; Missy Franklin; Jessica Hardy*; Breeja Larson*; Allison Schmitt; Rebecca Soni; Dana Vollmer	Swimming	Women's 4 × 100 m medley relay	August 4
Gold	Bob Bryan; Mike Bryan	Tennis	Men's doubles	August 4
Gold	Serena Williams	Tennis	Women's singles	August 4
Gold	Serena Williams; Venus Williams	Tennis	Women's doubles	August 5
Gold	Sanya Richards-Ross	Track & field	Women's 400 m	August 5
Gold	Jennifer Suhr	Track & field	Women's pole vault	August 6
Gold	Aly Raisman	Gymnastics	Women's floor	August 7
Gold	Aries Merritt	Track & field	Men's 110 m hurdles	August 8
Gold	Allyson Felix	Track & field	Women's 200 m	August 8
Gold	Brittney Reese	Track & field	Women's long jump	August 8
Gold	Misty May-Treanor; Kerri Walsh Jennings	Volleyball	Women's beach volleyball	August 8
Gold	Claressa Shields	Boxing	Women's middleweight	August 9
Gold	United States women's national soccer team: Nicole Barnhart; Shannon Boxx; Rachel Buehler; Lauren Cheney; Tobin Heath; Amy LePeilbet; Sydney Leroux; Carli Lloyd; Heather Mitts; Alex Morgan; Kelley O'Hara; Heather O'Reilly; Christie Rampone; Megan Rapinoe; Amy Rodriguez; Becky Sauerbrunn; Hope Solo; Abby Wambach	Soccer	Women's tournament	August 9
Gold	Christian Taylor	Track & field	Men's triple jump	August 9
Gold	Ashton Eaton	Track & field	Men's decathlon	August 9
Gold	United States women's national water polo team: Tumuaialii Anae; Elizabeth Armstrong; Kami Craig; Annika Dries; Courtney Mathewson; Heather Petri; Kelly Rulon; Melissa Seidemann; Jessica Steffens; Maggie Steffens; Brenda Villa; Lauren Wenger; Elsie Windes	Water polo	Women's tournament	August 9
Gold	Allyson Felix; Carmelita Jeter; Bianca Knight; Tianna Madison; Jeneba Tarmoh*; Lauryn Williams*	Track & field	Women's 4 × 100 m relay	August 10
Gold	Jordan Burroughs	Wrestling	Men's freestyle 74 kg	August 10
Gold	United States women's national basketball team: Seimone Augustus; Sue Bird; Tamika Catchings; Swin Cash; Tina Charles; Sylvia Fowles; Asjha Jones; Angel McCoughtry; Maya Moore; Candace Parker; Diana Taurasi; Lindsay Whalen	Basketball	Women's tournament	August 11
Gold	David Boudia	Diving	Men's 10 m platform	August 11
Gold	Keshia Baker*; Diamond Dixon*; Allyson Felix; Francena McCorory; Sanya Richards-Ross; DeeDee Trotter	Track & field	Women's 4 × 400 m relay	August 11
Gold	United States men's national basketball team: Carmelo Anthony; Kobe Bryant; Tyson Chandler; Anthony Davis; Kevin Durant; James Harden; Andre Iguodala; LeBron James; Kevin Love; Chris Paul; Russell Westbrook; Deron Williams	Basketball	Men's tournament	August 12
Gold	Jake Varner	Wrestling	Men's freestyle 96 kg	August 12
Silver	Brady Ellison; Jake Kaminski; Jacob Wukie	Archery	Men's team	July 28
Silver	Elizabeth Beisel	Swimming	Women's 400 m individual medley	July 28
Silver	Kelci Bryant; Abigail Johnston	Diving	Women's 3 m synchronized springboard	July 29
Silver	Nathan Adrian; Ricky Berens*; Jimmy Feigen*; Matt Grevers*; Cullen Jones; Jason Lezak*; Ryan Lochte; Michael Phelps	Swimming	Men's 4 × 100 m freestyle relay	July 29
Silver	Allison Schmitt	Swimming	Women's 400 m freestyle	July 29
Silver	Nick Thoman	Swimming	Men's 100 m backstroke	July 30
Silver	Rebecca Soni	Swimming	Women's 100 m breaststroke	July 30
Silver	Michael Phelps	Swimming	Men's 200 m butterfly	July 31
Silver	Ryan Lochte	Swimming	Men's 200 m individual medley	August 2
Silver	Cullen Jones	Swimming	Men's 50 m freestyle	August 3
Silver	Dotsie Bausch; Sarah Hammer; Jennie Reed*; Lauren Tamayo	Cycling	Women's team pursuit	August 4
Silver	Galen Rupp	Track & field	Men's 10,000 m	August 4
Silver	Carmelita Jeter	Track & field	Women's 100 m	August 4
Silver	McKayla Maroney	Gymnastics	Women's vault	August 5
Silver	Michael Tinsley	Track & field	Men's 400 m hurdles	August 6
Silver	Sarah Hammer	Cycling	Women's omnium	August 7
Silver	Leonel Manzano	Track & field	Men's 1500 m	August 7
Silver	Erik Kynard	Track & field	Men's high jump	August 7
Silver	Dawn Harper	Track & field	Women's 100 m hurdles	August 7
Silver	Jason Richardson	Track & field	Men's 110 m hurdles	August 8
Silver	Lashinda Demus	Track & field	Women's 400 m hurdles	August 8
Silver	Jennifer Kessy; April Ross	Volleyball	Women's beach volleyball	August 8
Silver	Haley Anderson	Swimming	Women's 10 km open water	August 9
Silver	Will Claye	Track & field	Men's triple jump	August 9
Silver	Trey Hardee	Track & field	Men's decathlon	August 9
Silver	Joshua Mance; Tony McQuay; Manteo Mitchell*; Bryshon Nellum; Angelo Taylor	Track & field	Men's 4 × 400 m relay	August 10
Silver	Brigetta Barrett	Track & field	Women's high jump	August 11
Silver	United States women's national volleyball team: Foluke Akinradewo; Lindsey Berg; Nicole Davis; Tayyiba Haneef-Park; Christa Harmotto; Megan Hodge; Destinee Hooker; Jordan Larson; Tamari Miyashiro; Danielle Scott-Arruda; Courtney Thompson; Logan Tom	Volleyball	Women's tournament	August 11
Bronze	Peter Vanderkaay	Swimming	Men's 400 m freestyle	July 28
Bronze	Natalie Coughlin*; Missy Franklin; Jessica Hardy; Lia Neal; Allison Schmitt; Amanda Weir*	Swimming	Women's 4 × 100 m freestyle relay	July 28
Bronze	Brendan Hansen	Swimming	Men's 100 m breaststroke	July 29
Bronze	David Boudia; Nicholas McCrory	Diving	Men's 10 m synchronized platform	July 30
Bronze	Marti Malloy	Judo	Women's 57 kg	July 30
Bronze	Caitlin Leverenz	Swimming	Women's 200 m individual medley	July 31
Bronze	Troy Dumais; Kristian Ipsen	Diving	Men's 3 m synchronized springboard	August 1
Bronze	Danell Leyva	Gymnastics	Men's artistic individual all-around	August 1
Bronze	Natalie Dell; Megan Kalmoe; Kara Kohler; Adrienne Martelli	Rowing	Women's quadruple sculls	August 1
Bronze	Ryan Lochte	Swimming	Men's 200 m backstroke	August 2
Bronze	Elizabeth Beisel	Swimming	Women's 200 m backstroke	August 3
Bronze	Reese Hoffa	Track & field	Men's shot put	August 3
Bronze	Courtney Hurley; Kelley Hurley; Maya Lawrence; Susie Scanlan*	Fencing	Women's team épée	August 4
Bronze	Charlie Cole; Scott Gault; Glenn Ochal; Henrik Rummel	Rowing	Men's four	August 4
Bronze	Will Claye	Track & field	Men's long jump	August 4
Bronze	Mike Bryan; Lisa Raymond	Tennis	Mixed doubles	August 5
Bronze	Justin Gatlin	Track & field	Men's 100 m	August 5
Bronze	DeeDee Trotter	Track & field	Women's 400 m	August 5
Bronze	Matthew Emmons	Shooting	Men's 50 m rifle 3 positions	August 6
Bronze	Aly Raisman	Gymnastics	Women's balance beam	August 7
Bronze	Kellie Wells	Track & field	Women's 100 m hurdles	August 7
Bronze	Marlen Esparza	Boxing	Women's flyweight	August 8
Bronze	Carmelita Jeter	Track & field	Women's 200 m	August 8
Bronze	Janay DeLoach	Track & field	Women's long jump	August 8
Bronze	Clarissa Chun	Wrestling	Women's freestyle 48 kg	August 8
Bronze	Terrence Jennings	Taekwondo	Men's 68 kg	August 9
Bronze	Paige McPherson	Taekwondo	Women's 67 kg	August 10
Bronze	Georgia Gould	Cycling	Women's cross-country	August 11
Bronze	Coleman Scott	Wrestling	Men's freestyle 60 kg	August 11

=== 2016 Rio ===
Medal	Name	Sport	Event	Date
Gold	Virginia Thrasher	Shooting	Women's 10 m air rifle	August 6
Gold	Nathan Adrian; Caeleb Dressel; Anthony Ervin*; Jimmy Feigen*; Ryan Held; Michael Phelps; Blake Pieroni*	Swimming	Men's 4 × 100 m freestyle relay	August 7
Gold	Katie Ledecky	Swimming	Women's 400 m freestyle	August 7
Gold	Ryan Murphy	Swimming	Men's 100 m backstroke	August 8
Gold	Lilly King	Swimming	Women's 100 m breaststroke	August 8
Gold	Simone Biles; Gabby Douglas; Laurie Hernandez; Madison Kocian; Alexandra Raisman	Gymnastics	Women's artistic team all-around	August 9
Gold	Michael Phelps	Swimming	Men's 200 m butterfly	August 9
Gold	Gunnar Bentz*; Jack Conger*; Conor Dwyer; Townley Haas; Ryan Lochte; Michael Phelps; Clark Smith*	Swimming	Men's 4 × 200 m freestyle relay	August 9
Gold	Katie Ledecky	Swimming	Women's 200 m freestyle	August 9
Gold	Kristin Armstrong	Cycling	Women's time trial	August 10
Gold	Maya DiRado; Missy Franklin*; Katie Ledecky; Melanie Margalis*; Cierra Runge*; Allison Schmitt; Leah Smith	Swimming	Women's 4 × 200 m freestyle relay	August 10
Gold	Simone Biles	Gymnastics	Women's artistic individual all-around	August 11
Gold	Kayla Harrison	Judo	Women's 78 kg	August 11
Gold	Ryan Murphy	Swimming	Men's 200 m backstroke	August 11
Gold	Michael Phelps	Swimming	Men's 200 m individual medley	August 11
Gold	Simone Manuel	Swimming	Women's 100 m freestyle	August 11
Gold	Michelle Carter	Athletics	Women's shot put	August 12
Gold	Anthony Ervin	Swimming	Men's 50 m freestyle	August 12
Gold	Katie Ledecky	Swimming	Women's 800 m freestyle	August 12
Gold	Maya DiRado	Swimming	Women's 200 m backstroke	August 12
Gold	Jeff Henderson	Athletics	Men's long jump	August 13
Gold	Amanda Elmore; Tessa Gobbo; Elle Logan; Meghan Musnicki; Amanda Polk; Emily Regan; Lauren Schmetterling; Kerry Simmonds; Katelin Snyder	Rowing	Women's eight	August 13
Gold	Nathan Adrian; Kevin Cordes*; Caeleb Dressel*; Cody Miller; Ryan Murphy; Michael Phelps; David Plummer*; Tom Shields*	Swimming	Men's 4 × 100 m medley relay	August 13
Gold	Kathleen Baker; Lilly King; Simone Manuel; Katie Meili*; Olivia Smoliga*; Dana Vollmer; Abbey Weitzeil*; Kelsi Worrell*	Swimming	Women's 4 × 100 m medley relay	August 13
Gold	Simone Biles	Gymnastics	Women's vault	August 14
Gold	Bethanie Mattek-Sands; Jack Sock	Tennis	Mixed doubles	August 14
Gold	Christian Taylor	Athletics	Men's triple jump	August 16
Gold	Simone Biles	Gymnastics	Women's floor	August 16
Gold	Brianna Rollins	Athletics	Women's 100 m hurdles	August 17
Gold	Tianna Bartoletta	Athletics	Women's long jump	August 17
Gold	Kerron Clement	Athletics	Men's 400 m hurdles	August 18
Gold	Ryan Crouser	Athletics	Men's shot put	August 18
Gold	Ashton Eaton	Athletics	Men's decathlon	August 18
Gold	Dalilah Muhammad	Athletics	Women's 400 m hurdles	August 18
Gold	Helen Maroulis	Wrestling	Women's freestyle 53 kg	August 18
Gold	Morolake Akinosun*; Tianna Bartoletta; Tori Bowie; Allyson Felix; English Gardner	Athletics	Women's 4 × 100 m relay	August 19
Gold	Connor Fields	Cycling	Men's BMX	August 19
Gold	United States women's national water polo team: Caroline Clark; Kami Craig; Rachel Fattal; Aria Fischer; Makenzie Fischer; Kaleigh Gilchrist; Samantha Hill; Ashleigh Johnson; Courtney Mathewson; Madeline Musselmann; Kiley Neushul; Melissa Seidemann; Maggie Steffens	Water polo	Women's tournament	August 19
Gold	Matthew Centrowitz Jr.	Athletics	Men's 1500 m	August 20
Gold	Kyle Clemons*; Arman Hall; Tony McQuay; LaShawn Merritt; Gil Roberts; David Verburg*	Athletics	Men's 4 × 400 m relay	August 20
Gold	Taylor Ellis-Watson*; Allyson Felix; Phyllis Francis; Natasha Hastings; Francena McCorory*; Courtney Okolo	Athletics	Women's 4 × 400 m relay	August 20
Gold	United States women's national basketball team: Seimone Augustus; Sue Bird; Tamika Catchings; Tina Charles; Elena Delle Donne; Sylvia Fowles; Brittney Griner; Angel McCoughtry; Maya Moore; Breanna Stewart; Diana Taurasi; Lindsay Whalen	Basketball	Women's tournament	August 20
Gold	Gwen Jorgensen	Triathlon	Women's	August 20
Gold	United States men's national basketball team: Carmelo Anthony; Harrison Barnes; Jimmy Butler; DeMarcus Cousins; DeMar DeRozan; Kevin Durant; Paul George; Draymond Green; Kyrie Irving; DeAndre Jordan; Kyle Lowry; Klay Thompson	Basketball	Men's tournament	August 21
Gold	Claressa Shields	Boxing	Women's middleweight	August 21
Gold	Kyle Snyder	Wrestling	Men's freestyle 97 kg	August 21
Silver	Brady Ellison; Zach Garrett; Jake Kaminski	Archery	Men's team	August 6
Silver	Chase Kalisz	Swimming	Men's 400 m individual medley	August 6
Silver	Maya DiRado	Swimming	Women's 400 m individual medley	August 6
Silver	Katie Ledecky; Simone Manuel; Lia Neal*; Allison Schmitt*; Dana Vollmer; Amanda Weir*; Abbey Weitzeil	Swimming	Women's 4 × 100 m freestyle relay	August 6
Silver	Alexander Massialas	Fencing	Men's foil	August 7
Silver	David Boudia; Steele Johnson	Diving	Men's synchronized 10 m platform	August 8
Silver	Kathleen Baker	Swimming	Women's 100 m backstroke	August 8
Silver	Travis Stevens	Judo	Men's 81 kg	August 9
Silver	Sam Dorman; Michael Hixon	Diving	Men's 3 m synchronized springboard	August 10
Silver	Daryl Homer	Fencing	Men's sabre	August 10
Silver	Josh Prenot	Swimming	Men's 200 m breaststroke	August 10
Silver	Alexandra Raisman	Gymnastics	Women's artistic individual all-around	August 11
Silver	Michael Phelps	Swimming	Men's 100 m butterfly	August 12
Silver	Tori Bowie	Athletics	Women's 100 m	August 13
Silver	Kelly Catlin; Chloé Dygert; Sarah Hammer; Jennifer Valente	Cycling	Women's team pursuit	August 13
Silver	Gevvie Stone	Rowing	Women's single sculls	August 13
Silver	Connor Jaeger	Swimming	Men's 1500 m freestyle	August 13
Silver	Simone Manuel	Swimming	Women's 50 m freestyle	August 13
Silver	Justin Gatlin	Athletics	Men's 100 m	August 14
Silver	Madison Kocian	Gymnastics	Women's uneven bars	August 14
Silver	Rajeev Ram; Venus Williams	Tennis	Mixed doubles	August 14
Silver	Allyson Felix	Athletics	Women's 400 m	August 15
Silver	Laurie Hernandez	Gymnastics	Women's balance beam	August 15
Silver	Will Claye	Athletics	Men's triple jump	August 16
Silver	Sarah Hammer	Cycling	Women's omnium	August 16
Silver	Danell Leyva	Gymnastics	Men's parallel bars	August 16
Silver	Danell Leyva	Gymnastics	Men's horizontal bar	August 16
Silver	Alexandra Raisman	Gymnastics	Women's floor	August 16
Silver	Evan Jager	Athletics	Men's 3000 m steeplechase	August 17
Silver	Nia Ali	Athletics	Women's 100 m hurdles	August 17
Silver	Brittney Reese	Athletics	Women's long jump	August 17
Silver	Lucy Davis; Kent Farrington; Beezie Madden; McLain Ward	Equestrian	Team jumping	August 17
Silver	Joe Kovacs	Athletics	Men's shot put	August 18
Silver	Sandi Morris	Athletics	Women's pole vault	August 19
Silver	Alise Willoughby	Cycling	Women's BMX	August 19
Silver	Paul Chelimo	Athletics	Men's 5000 m	August 20
Silver	Shakur Stevenson	Boxing	Men's bantamweight	August 20
Bronze	Corey Cogdell	Shooting	Women's trap	August 7
Bronze	Cody Miller	Swimming	Men's 100 m breaststroke	August 7
Bronze	Leah Smith	Swimming	Women's 400 m freestyle	August 7
Bronze	Dana Vollmer	Swimming	Women's 100 m butterfly	August 7
Bronze	Conor Dwyer	Swimming	Men's 200 m freestyle	August 8
Bronze	David Plummer	Swimming	Men's 100 m backstroke	August 8
Bronze	Katie Meili	Swimming	Women's 100 m breaststroke	August 8
Bronze	Phillip Dutton	Equestrian	Individual eventing	August 9
Bronze	Maya DiRado	Swimming	Women's 200 m individual medley	August 9
Bronze	Nathan Adrian	Swimming	Men's 100 m freestyle	August 10
Bronze	Brady Ellison	Archery	Men's individual	August 12
Bronze	Nico Hernández	Boxing	Men's light flyweight	August 12
Bronze	Allison Brock; Laura Graves; Kasey Perry-Glass; Steffen Peters	Equestrian	Team dressage	August 12
Bronze	Miles Chamley-Watson; Race Imboden; Alexander Massialas; Gerek Meinhardt	Fencing	Men's team foil	August 12
Bronze	Kimberly Rhode	Shooting	Women's skeet	August 12
Bronze	Nathan Adrian	Swimming	Men's 50 m freestyle	August 12
Bronze	Steve Johnson; Jack Sock	Tennis	Men's doubles	August 12
Bronze	Monica Aksamit; Ibtihaj Muhammad; Dagmara Wozniak; Mariel Zagunis	Fencing	Women's team sabre	August 13
Bronze	LaShawn Merritt	Athletics	Men's 400 m	August 14
Bronze	Matt Kuchar	Golf	Men's	August 14
Bronze	Alexander Naddour	Gymnastics	Men's pommel horse	August 14
Bronze	Sarah Robles	Weightlifting	Women's +75 kg	August 14
Bronze	Clayton Murphy	Athletics	Men's 800 m	August 15
Bronze	Sam Kendricks	Athletics	Men's pole vault	August 15
Bronze	Emma Coburn	Athletics	Women's 3000 m steeplechase	August 15
Bronze	Simone Biles	Gymnastics	Women's balance beam	August 15
Bronze	Jennifer Simpson	Athletics	Women's 1500 m	August 16
Bronze	Caleb Paine	Sailing	Men's Finn	August 16
Bronze	Tori Bowie	Athletics	Women's 200 m	August 17
Bronze	Kristi Castlin	Athletics	Women's 100 m hurdles	August 17
Bronze	April Ross; Kerri Walsh Jennings	Volleyball	Women's beach	August 17
Bronze	Ashley Spencer	Athletics	Women's 400 m hurdles	August 18
Bronze	David Boudia	Diving	Men's 10 m platform	August 20
Bronze	Jackie Galloway	Taekwondo	Women's +67 kg	August 20
Bronze	United States women's national volleyball team: Rachael Adams; Foluke Akinradewo; Kayla Banwarth; Alisha Glass; Christa Harmotto; Kimberly Hill; Jordan Larson; Carli Lloyd; Karsta Lowe; Kelly Murphy; Kelsey Robinson; Courtney Thompson	Volleyball	Women's indoor tournament	August 20
Bronze	J'den Cox	Wrestling	Men's freestyle 86 kg	August 20
Bronze	Galen Rupp	Athletics	Men's marathon	August 21
Bronze	United States men's national volleyball team: Matthew Anderson; Micah Christenson; Maxwell Holt; Thomas Jaeschke; Davie Lee; William Priddy; Aaron Russell; Taylor Sander; Erik Shoji; Kawika Shoji; David Smith; Murphy Troy	Volleyball	Men's indoor tournament	August 21

=== 2020 Tokyo ===
Medal	Name	Sport	Event	Date
Gold	Lee Kiefer	Fencing	Women's foil	July 25
Gold	Will Shaner	Shooting	Men's 10 m air rifle	July 25
Gold	Chase Kalisz	Swimming	Men's 400 m individual medley	July 25
Gold	Anastasija Zolotic	Taekwondo	Women's −57 kg	July 25
Gold	Zach Apple; Bowe Becker; Brooks Curry^{[a]} Caeleb Dressel; Blake Pieroni	Swimming	Men's 4 × 100 m freestyle relay	July 26
Gold	Vincent Hancock	Shooting	Men's skeet	July 26
Gold	Amber English	Shooting	Women's skeet	July 26
Gold	Carissa Moore	Surfing	Women's shortboard	July 27
Gold	Lydia Jacoby	Swimming	Women's 100 m breaststroke	July 27
Gold	United States women's national 3x3 team: Stefanie Dolson; Allisha Gray; Kelsey Plum; Jackie Young	Basketball	Women's 3x3 tournament	July 28
Gold	Katie Ledecky	Swimming	Women's 1500 m freestyle	July 28
Gold	Sunisa Lee	Gymnastics	Women's artistic individual all-around	July 29
Gold	Caeleb Dressel	Swimming	Men's 100 m freestyle	July 29
Gold	Bobby Finke	Swimming	Men's 800 m freestyle	July 29
Gold	Caeleb Dressel	Swimming	Men's 100 m butterfly	July 31
Gold	Katie Ledecky	Swimming	Women's 800 m freestyle	July 31
Gold	Xander Schauffele	Golf	Men's	August 1
Gold	Caeleb Dressel	Swimming	Men's 50 m freestyle	August 1
Gold	Bobby Finke	Swimming	Men's 1500 m freestyle	August 1
Gold	Michael Andrew; Zach Apple; Hunter Armstrong^{[a]} Caeleb Dressel; Ryan Murphy; Blake Pieroni^{[a]} Tom Shields^{[a]} Andrew Wilson^{[a]}	Swimming	Men's 4 × 100 m medley relay	August 1
Gold	Valarie Allman	Athletics	Women's discus throw	August 2
Gold	Jade Carey	Gymnastics	Women's floor	August 2
Gold	Athing Mu	Athletics	Women's 800 m	August 3
Gold	Tamyra Mensah Stock	Wrestling	Women's freestyle 68 kg	August 3
Gold	Sydney McLaughlin	Athletics	Women's 400 m hurdles	August 4
Gold	Ryan Crouser	Athletics	Men's shot put	August 5
Gold	Katie Nageotte	Athletics	Women's pole vault	August 5
Gold	Nevin Harrison	Canoeing	Women's C-1 200 m	August 5
Gold	David Taylor	Wrestling	Men's freestyle 86 kg	August 5
Gold	April Ross; Alix Klineman	Volleyball	Women's beach volleyball tournament	August 6
Gold	Gable Steveson	Wrestling	Men's freestyle 125 kg	August 6
Gold	Rai Benjamin; Michael Cherry; Bryce Deadmon; Michael Norman; Vernon Norwood^{[a]} Randolph Ross^{[a]} Trevor Stewart^{[a]}	Athletics	Men's 4 × 400 m relay	August 7
Gold	Kendall Ellis^{[a]} Allyson Felix; Lynna Irby^{[a]} Wadeline Jonathas^{[a]} Sydney McLaughlin; Athing Mu; Dalilah Muhammad; Kaylin Whitney^{[a]}	Athletics	Women's 4 × 400 m relay	August 7
Gold	United States men's national basketball team: Bam Adebayo; Devin Booker; Kevin Durant; Jerami Grant; Draymond Green; Jrue Holiday; Keldon Johnson; Zach LaVine; Damian Lillard; JaVale McGee; Khris Middleton; Jayson Tatum	Basketball	Men's 5x5 tournament	August 7
Gold	Nelly Korda	Golf	Women's	August 7
Gold	United States women's national water polo team: Ashleigh Johnson (gk); Maddie Musselman; Melissa Seidemann; Rachel Fattal; Paige Hauschild; Maggie Steffens (c); Stephania Haralabidis; Jamie Neushul; Aria Fischer; Kaleigh Gilchrist; Makenzie Fischer; Alys Williams; Amanda Longan (gk)	Water polo	Women's tournament	August 7
Gold	United States women's national basketball team: Ariel Atkins; Sue Bird; Tina Charles; Napheesa Collier; Skylar Diggins-Smith; Sylvia Fowles; Chelsea Gray; Brittney Griner; Jewell Loyd; Breanna Stewart; Diana Taurasi; A'ja Wilson	Basketball	Women's 5x5 tournament	August 8
Gold	Jennifer Valente	Cycling	Women's omnium	August 8
Gold	United States women's national volleyball team: Micha Hancock; Jordyn Poulter; Justine Wong-Orantes; Jordan Larson (c); Annie Drews; Jordan Thompson; Michelle Bartsch-Hackley; Kimberly Hill; Foluke Akinradewo; Haleigh Washington; Kelsey Robinson; Chiaka Ogbogu	Volleyball	Women's tournament	August 8
Silver	Jay Litherland	Swimming	Men's 400 m individual medley	July 25
Silver	Emma Weyant	Swimming	Women's 400 m individual medley	July 25
Silver	Katie Ledecky	Swimming	Women's 400 m freestyle	July 26
Silver	Jessica Parratto; Delaney Schnell	Diving	Women's synchronized 10 m platform	July 27
Silver	Adrienne Lyle; Steffen Peters; Sabine Schut-Kery	Equestrian	Team dressage	July 27
Silver	Simone Biles; Jordan Chiles; Sunisa Lee; Grace McCallum	Gymnastics	Women's artistic team all-around	July 27
Silver	Lucas Kozeniesky; Mary Tucker	Shooting	Mixed 10 m air rifle	July 27
Silver	United States women's national softball team: Monica Abbott; Ali Aguilar; Valerie Arioto; Ally Carda; Amanda Chidester; Rachel Garcia; Haylie McCleney; Aubree Munro; Michelle Moultrie; Dejah Mulipolah; Bubba Nickles; Cat Osterman; Delaney Spaulding; Kelsey Stewart; Janie Reed	Softball	Women's tournament	July 27
Silver	Andrew Capobianco; Michael Hixon	Diving	Men's synchronized 3 m springboard	July 28
Silver	Erica Sullivan	Swimming	Women's 1500 m freestyle	July 28
Silver	Alex Walsh	Swimming	Women's 200 m individual medley	July 28
Silver	Kayle Browning	Shooting	Women's trap	July 29
Silver	Regan Smith	Swimming	Women's 200 m butterfly	July 29
Silver	Brooke Forde^{[a]} Paige Madden; Katie McLaughlin; Katie Ledecky; Allison Schmitt; Bella Sims^{[a]}	Swimming	Women's 4 × 200 m freestyle relay	July 29
Silver	Ryan Murphy	Swimming	Men's 200 m backstroke	July 30
Silver	Lilly King	Swimming	Women's 200 m breaststroke	July 30
Silver	Taylor Knibb; Kevin McDowell; Morgan Pearson; Katie Zaferes	Triathlon	Mixed relay	July 31
Silver	Fred Kerley	Athletics	Men's 100 m	August 1
Silver	Raven Saunders	Athletics	Women's shot put	August 1
Silver	Hannah Roberts	Cycling	Women's BMX freestyle	August 1
Silver	MyKayla Skinner	Gymnastics	Women's vault	August 1
Silver	Erika Brown^{[a]} Claire Curzan^{[a]} Torri Huske; Lydia Jacoby; Lilly King^{[a]} Regan Smith; Abbey Weitzeil; Rhyan White^{[a]}	Swimming	Women's 4 × 100 m medley relay	August 1
Silver	Katherine Nye	Weightlifting	Women's −76 kg	August 1
Silver	Kendra Harrison	Athletics	Women's 100 m hurdles	August 2
Silver	Adeline Gray	Wrestling	Women's freestyle 76 kg	August 2
Silver	Rai Benjamin	Athletics	Men's 400 m hurdles	August 3
Silver	Chris Nilsen	Athletics	Men's pole vault	August 3
Silver	Brittney Reese	Athletics	Women's long jump	August 3
Silver	Kenny Bednarek	Athletics	Men's 200 m	August 4
Silver	Dalilah Muhammad	Athletics	Women's 400 m hurdles	August 4
Silver	Courtney Frerichs	Athletics	Women's 3000 m steeplechase	August 4
Silver	Grant Holloway	Athletics	Men's 110 m hurdles	August 5
Silver	Joe Kovacs	Athletics	Men's shot put	August 5
Silver	Duke Ragan	Boxing	Men's featherweight	August 5
Silver	Nathaniel Coleman	Sport climbing	Men's combined	August 5
Silver	Teahna Daniels; English Gardner^{[a]} Aleia Hobbs^{[a]} Javianne Oliver; Jenna Prandini; Gabrielle Thomas	Athletics	Women's 4 × 100 metres relay	August 6
Silver	United States men's national baseball team: Nick Allen; Eddy Alvarez; Tyler Austin; Shane Baz; Triston Casas; Anthony Carter; Brandon Dickson; Tim Federowicz; Eric Filia; Todd Frazier; Anthony Gose; Edwin Jackson; Scott Kazmir; Patrick Kivlehan; Mark Kolozsvary; Jack López; Nick Martinez; Scott McGough; David Robertson; Joe Ryan; Ryder Ryan; Simeon Woods Richardson; Bubba Starling; Jamie Westbrook	Baseball	Men's tournament	August 7
Silver	Laura Kraut; Jessica Springsteen; McLain Ward	Equestrian	Team jumping	August 7
Silver	Kyle Snyder	Wrestling	Men's freestyle 97 kg	August 7
Silver	Keyshawn Davis	Boxing	Men's lightweight	August 8
Silver	Richard Torrez	Boxing	Men's super heavyweight	August 8
Bronze	Jagger Eaton	Skateboarding	Men's street	July 25
Bronze	Kieran Smith	Swimming	Men's 400 m freestyle	July 25
Bronze	Hali Flickinger	Swimming	Women's 400 m individual medley	July 25
Bronze	Erika Brown; Catie DeLoof^{[a]} Natalie Hinds; Simone Manuel; Allison Schmitt^{[a]} Olivia Smoliga^{[a]} Abbey Weitzeil	Swimming	Women's 4 × 100 m freestyle relay	July 25
Bronze	Ryan Murphy	Swimming	Men's 100 m backstroke	July 27
Bronze	Regan Smith	Swimming	Women's 100 m backstroke	July 27
Bronze	Lilly King	Swimming	Women's 100 m breaststroke	July 27
Bronze	Katie Zaferes	Triathlon	Women's	July 27
Bronze	Kate Douglass	Swimming	Women's 200 m individual medley	July 28
Bronze	Hali Flickinger	Swimming	Women's 200 m butterfly	July 29
Bronze	Annie Lazor	Swimming	Women's 200 m breaststroke	July 30
Bronze	Bryce Deadmon^{[a]} Kendall Ellis; Elija Godwin^{[a]} Lynna Irby^{[a]} Taylor Manson^{[a]} Vernon Norwood; Trevor Stewart; Kaylin Whitney	Athletics	Mixed 4 × 400 m relay	July 31
Bronze	Brian Burrows; Madelynn Bernau	Shooting	Mixed trap team	July 31
Bronze	Krysta Palmer	Diving	Women's 3 m springboard	August 1
Bronze	Race Imboden; Nick Itkin; Alexander Massialas; Gerek Meinhardt	Fencing	Men's team foil	August 1
Bronze	Sunisa Lee	Gymnastics	Women's uneven bars	August 1
Bronze	Sarah Robles	Weightlifting	Women's +87 kg	August 2
Bronze	Gabrielle Thomas	Athletics	Women's 200 m	August 3
Bronze	Raevyn Rogers	Athletics	Women's 800 m	August 3
Bronze	Chloé Dygert; Megan Jastrab; Emma White; Lily Williams^{[a]}	Cycling	Women's team pursuit	August 3
Bronze	Simone Biles	Gymnastics	Women's balance beam	August 3
Bronze	Noah Lyles	Athletics	Men's 200 m	August 4
Bronze	Oshae Jones	Boxing	Women's welterweight	August 4
Bronze	United States women's national soccer team: Jane Campbell; Abby Dahlkemper; Tierna Davidson; Crystal Dunn; Julie Ertz; Adrianna Franch; Tobin Heath; Lindsey Horan; Casey Krueger; Rose Lavelle; Carli Lloyd; Catarina Macario; Kristie Mewis; Sam Mewis; Alex Morgan; Alyssa Naeher; Kelley O'Hara; Christen Press; Megan Rapinoe; Becky Sauerbrunn (c); Emily Sonnett; Lynn Williams	Football	Women's tournament	August 5
Bronze	Cory Juneau	Skateboarding	Men's park	August 5
Bronze	Thomas Gilman (wrestler)	Wrestling	Men's freestyle 57 kg	August 5
Bronze	Helen Maroulis	Wrestling	Women's freestyle 57 kg	August 5
Bronze	Paul Chelimo	Athletics	Men's 5000 m	August 6
Bronze	Allyson Felix	Athletics	Women's 400 m	August 6
Bronze	Ariel Torres	Karate	Men's kata	August 6
Bronze	Kyle Dake	Wrestling	Men's freestyle 74 kg	August 6
Bronze	Molly Seidel	Athletics	Women's marathon	August 7
Bronze	Sarah Hildebrandt	Wrestling	Women's freestyle 50 kg	August 7

=== 2024 Paris ===
Medal	Name	Sport	Event	Date
Gold	Jack Alexy; Hunter Armstrong; Caeleb Dressel; Chris Guiliano; Ryan Held^{[a]} Matt King^{[a]}	Swimming	Men's 4 × 100 m freestyle relay	July 27
Gold	Lee Kiefer	Fencing	Women's foil	July 28
Gold	Torri Huske	Swimming	Women's 100 m butterfly	July 28
Gold	Simone Biles; Jade Carey; Jordan Chiles; Sunisa Lee; Hezly Rivera	Gymnastics	Women's artistic team all-around	July 30
Gold	Katie Ledecky	Swimming	Women's 1500 m freestyle	July 31
Gold	Jacqueline Dubrovich; Lee Kiefer; Lauren Scruggs; Maia Weintraub	Fencing	Women's team foil	August 1
Gold	Simone Biles	Gymnastics	Women's artistic individual all-around	August 1
Gold	Justin Best; Liam Corrigan; Michael Grady; Nick Mead	Rowing	Men's four	August 1
Gold	Kate Douglass	Swimming	Women's 200 m breaststroke	August 1
Gold	Ryan Crouser	Athletics	Men's shot put	August 3
Gold	Simone Biles	Gymnastics	Women's vault	August 3
Gold	Vincent Hancock	Shooting	Men's skeet	August 3
Gold	Katie Ledecky	Swimming	Women's 800 m freestyle	August 3
Gold	Caeleb Dressel^{[a]} Nic Fink; Torri Huske; Ryan Murphy; Regan Smith^{[a]} Charlie Swanson^{[a]} Gretchen Walsh; Abbey Weitzeil^{[a]}	Swimming	Mixed 4 × 100 m medley relay	August 3
Gold	Noah Lyles	Athletics	Men's 100 m	August 4
Gold	Kristen Faulkner	Cycling	Women's individual road race	August 4
Gold	Scottie Scheffler	Golf	Men's individual	August 4
Gold	Bobby Finke	Swimming	Men's 1500 m freestyle	August 4
Gold	Katharine Berkoff^{[a]} Kate Douglass^{[a]} Torri Huske; Lilly King; Alex Shackell^{[a]} Regan Smith; Gretchen Walsh; Emma Weber^{[a]}	Swimming	Women's 4 × 100 m medley relay	August 4
Gold	Valarie Allman	Athletics	Women's discus throw	August 5
Gold	Caroline Marks	Surfing	Women's shortboard	August 5
Gold	Cole Hocker	Athletics	Men's 1500 m	August 6
Gold	Gabby Thomas	Athletics	Women's 200 m	August 6
Gold	Amit Elor	Wrestling	Women's freestyle 68 kg	August 6
Gold	Quincy Hall	Athletics	Men's 400 m	August 7
Gold	Chloé Dygert; Kristen Faulkner; Jennifer Valente; Lily Williams	Cycling	Women's team pursuit	August 7
Gold	Sarah Hildebrandt	Wrestling	Women's freestyle 50 kg	August 7
Gold	Grant Holloway	Athletics	Men's 110 m hurdles	August 8
Gold	Sydney McLaughlin-Levrone	Athletics	Women's 400 m hurdles	August 8
Gold	Tara Davis-Woodhall	Athletics	Women's long jump	August 8
Gold	Rai Benjamin	Athletics	Men's 400 m hurdles	August 9
Gold	Melissa Jefferson; Sha'Carri Richardson; Twanisha Terry; Gabby Thomas	Athletics	Women's 4 x 100 m relay	August 9
Gold	Olivia Reeves	Weightlifting	Women's 71 kg	August 9
Gold	Christopher Bailey; Rai Benjamin; Bryce Deadmon; Vernon Norwood; Quincy Wilson^{[a]}	Athletics	Men's 4 × 400 m relay	August 10
Gold	Masai Russell	Athletics	Women's 100 m hurdles	August 10
Gold	Kaylyn Brown^{[a]} Aaliyah Butler^{[a]} Quanera Hayes^{[a]} Alexis Holmes; Shamier Little; Sydney McLaughlin-Levrone; Gabby Thomas	Athletics	Women's 4 × 400 m relay	August 10
Gold	United States men's national basketball team: Bam Adebayo; Devin Booker; Stephen Curry; Anthony Davis; Kevin Durant; Anthony Edwards; Joel Embiid; Tyrese Haliburton; Jrue Holiday; LeBron James; Jayson Tatum; Derrick White	Basketball	Men's tournament	August 10
Gold	United States women's national soccer team: Korbin Albert; Croix Bethune; Sam Coffey; Tierna Davidson; Crystal Dunn; Emily Fox; Naomi Girma; Lindsey Horan; Casey Krueger; Rose Lavelle; Casey Murphy; Alyssa Naeher; Jenna Nighswonger; Trinity Rodman; Emily Sams; Jaedyn Shaw; Sophia Smith; Emily Sonnett; Mallory Swanson; Lynn Williams	Football	Women's tournament	August 10
Gold	United States women's national basketball team: Napheesa Collier; Kahleah Copper; Chelsea Gray; Brittney Griner; Sabrina Ionescu; Jewell Loyd; Kelsey Plum; Breanna Stewart; Diana Taurasi; Alyssa Thomas; A'ja Wilson; Jackie Young	Basketball	Women's tournament	August 11
Gold	Jennifer Valente	Cycling	Women's omnium	August 11
Silver	Sarah Bacon; Kassidy Cook	Diving	Women's synchronized 3 m springboard	July 27
Silver	Erika Connolly^{[a]} Kate Douglass; Torri Huske; Simone Manuel; Gretchen Walsh; Abbey Weitzeil^{[a]}	Swimming	Women's 4 × 100 m freestyle relay	July 27
Silver	Haley Batten	Cycling	Women's cross-country	July 28
Silver	Lauren Scruggs	Fencing	Women's foil	July 28
Silver	Nic Fink	Swimming	Men's 100 m breaststroke	July 28
Silver	Gretchen Walsh	Swimming	Women's 100 m butterfly	July 28
Silver	Jagger Eaton	Skateboarding	Men's street	July 29
Silver	Katie Grimes	Swimming	Women's 400 m individual medley	July 29
Silver	Bobby Finke	Swimming	Men's 800 m freestyle	July 30
Silver	Brooks Curry^{[a]} Carson Foster; Chris Guiliano^{[a]} Luke Hobson; Drew Kibler; Blake Pieroni^{[a]} Kieran Smith	Swimming	Men's 4 × 200 m freestyle relay	July 30
Silver	Regan Smith	Swimming	Women's 100 m backstroke	July 30
Silver	Perris Benegas	Cycling	Women's BMX freestyle	July 31
Silver	Torri Huske	Swimming	Women's 100 m freestyle	July 31
Silver	Regan Smith	Swimming	Women's 200 m butterfly	August 1
Silver	Erin Gemmel; Katie Ledecky; Paige Madden; Simone Manuel^{[a]} Anna Peplowski^{[a]} Alex Shackell^{[a]} Claire Weinstein	Swimming	Women's 4 × 200 m freestyle relay	August 1
Silver	Karl Cook; Laura Kraut; McLain Ward	Equestrian	Team jumping	August 2
Silver	Sagen Maddalena	Shooting	Women's 50 m rifle three positions	August 2
Silver	Regan Smith	Swimming	Women's 200 m backstroke	August 2
Silver	Joe Kovacs	Athletics	Men's shot put	August 3
Silver	Sha'Carri Richardson	Athletics	Women's 100 m	August 3
Silver	Kaylyn Brown; Bryce Deadmon; Shamier Little; Vernon Norwood	Athletics	Mixed 4 × 400 m relay	August 3
Silver	Conner Prince	Shooting	Men's skeet	August 3
Silver	Kate Douglass	Swimming	Women's 200 m individual medley	August 3
Silver	Austin Krajicek; Rajeev Ram	Tennis	Men's doubles	August 3
Silver	Brady Ellison	Archery	Men's individual	August 4
Silver	Jack Alexy^{[a]} Hunter Armstrong; Caeleb Dressel; Nic Fink; Thomas Heilman^{[a]} Ryan Murphy; Charlie Swanson^{[a]}	Swimming	Men's 4 × 100 m medley relay	August 4
Silver	Sam Kendricks	Athletics	Men's pole vault	August 5
Silver	Simone Biles	Gymnastics	Women's floor	August 5
Silver	Vincent Hancock; Austen Smith	Shooting	Mixed skeet team	August 5
Silver	Taylor Knibb; Morgan Pearson; Seth Rider; Taylor Spivey	Triathlon	Mixed relay	August 5
Silver	Annette Echikunwoke	Athletics	Women's hammer throw	August 6
Silver	Anita Alvarez; Jamie Czarkowski; Megumi Field; Keana Hunter; Audrey Kwon; Jacklyn Luu; Daniella Ramirez; Ruby Remati	Artistic swimming	Team	August 7
Silver	Katie Moon	Athletics	Women's pole vault	August 7
Silver	Kenneth Rooks	Athletics	Men's 3000 m steeplechase	August 7
Silver	Tom Schaar	Skateboarding	Men's park	August 7
Silver	Kenny Bednarek	Athletics	Men's 200 m	August 8
Silver	Daniel Roberts	Athletics	Men's 110 m hurdles	August 8
Silver	Anna Cockrell	Athletics	Women's 400 m hurdles	August 8
Silver	Spencer Lee	Wrestling	Men's freestyle 57 kg	August 9
Silver	Shelby McEwen	Athletics	Men's high jump	August 10
Silver	Nevin Harrison	Canoeing	Women's C-1 200 m	August 10
Silver	Brooke Raboutou	Sport climbing	Women's combined	August 10
Silver	United States women's national volleyball team: Lauren Carlini; Andrea Drews; Micha Hancock; Jordan Larson; Chiaka Ogbogu; Kathryn Plummer; Jordyn Poulter; Dana Rettke; Kelsey Robinson; Avery Skinner; Jordan Thompson; Haleigh Washington; Justine Wong-Orantes	Volleyball	Women's tournament	August 11
Silver	Kennedy Blades	Wrestling	Women's freestyle 76 kg	August 11
Bronze	Chloé Dygert	Cycling	Women's road time trial	July 27
Bronze	Katie Ledecky	Swimming	Women's 400 m freestyle	July 27
Bronze	Carson Foster	Swimming	Men's 400 m individual medley	July 28
Bronze	Nick Itkin	Fencing	Men's foil	July 29
Bronze	Asher Hong; Paul Juda; Brody Malone; Stephen Nedoroscik; Fred Richard	Gymnastics	Men's artistic team all-around	July 29
Bronze	Nyjah Huston	Skateboarding	Men's street	July 29
Bronze	Luke Hobson	Swimming	Men's 200 m freestyle	July 29
Bronze	Ryan Murphy	Swimming	Men's 100 m backstroke	July 29
Bronze	Emma Weyant	Swimming	Women's 400 m individual medley	July 29
Bronze	United States women's national rugby sevens team: Kayla Canett; Lauren Doyle; Alev Kelter; Kristi Kirshe; Sarah Levy; Ilona Maher; Alena Olsen; Ariana Ramsey; Stephanie Rovetti; Spiff Sedrick; Sammy Sullivan; Naya Tapper	Rugby sevens	Women's tournament	July 30
Bronze	Katharine Berkoff	Swimming	Women's 100 m backstroke	July 30
Bronze	Evy Leibfarth	Canoeing	Women's slalom C-1	July 31
Bronze	Sunisa Lee	Gymnastics	Women's artistic individual all-around	August 1
Bronze	Brady Ellison; Casey Kaufhold	Archery	Mixed team	August 2
Bronze	Grant Fisher	Athletics	Men's 10,000 m	August 2
Bronze	Ian Barrows; Hans Henken	Sailing	49er	August 2
Bronze	Melissa Jefferson	Athletics	Women's 100 m	August 3
Bronze	Jasmine Moore	Athletics	Women's triple jump	August 3
Bronze	Stephen Nedoroscik	Gymnastics	Men's pommel horse	August 3
Bronze	Jade Carey	Gymnastics	Women's vault	August 3
Bronze	Christopher Carlson; Peter Chatain; Clark Dean; Henry Hollingsworth; Rielly Milne (c); Evan Olson; Pieter Quinton; Nicholas Rusher; Christian Tabash	Rowing	Men's eight	August 3
Bronze	Paige Madden	Swimming	Women's 800 m freestyle	August 3
Bronze	Taylor Fritz; Tommy Paul	Tennis	Men's doubles	August 3
Bronze	Fred Kerley	Athletics	Men's 100 m	August 4
Bronze	Sunisa Lee	Gymnastics	Women's uneven bars	August 4
Bronze	Austen Smith	Shooting	Women's skeet	August 4
Bronze	United States women's national 3x3 team Cierra Burdick; Dearica Hamby; Rhyne Howard; Hailey Van Lith	Basketball	Women's 3x3 tournament	August 5
Bronze	Yared Nuguse	Athletics	Men's 1500 m	August 6
Bronze	Brittany Brown	Athletics	Women's 200 m	August 6
Bronze	Omari Jones	Boxing	Men's welterweight	August 6
Bronze	Hampton Morris	Weightlifting	Men's 61 kg	August 7
Bronze	Noah Lyles	Athletics	Men's 200 m	August 8
Bronze	Jasmine Moore	Athletics	Women's long jump	August 8
Bronze	Sam Watson	Sport climbing	Men's speed	August 8
Bronze	Kristina Teachout	Taekwondo	Women's 67 kg	August 9
Bronze	United States men's national volleyball team: Matt Anderson; Taylor Averill; Micah Christenson; TJ DeFalco; Maxwell Holt; Thomas Jaeschke; Jeffrey Jendryk; Micah Maʻa; Garrett Muagututia; Aaron Russell; Erik Shoji; David Smith	Volleyball	Men's tournament	August 9
Bronze	Aaron Brooks	Wrestling	Men's freestyle 86 kg	August 9
Bronze	Helen Maroulis	Wrestling	Women's freestyle 57 kg	August 9
Bronze	Grant Fisher	Athletics	Men's 5000 m	August 10
Bronze	Victor Montalvo	Breaking	B-Boys	August 10
Bronze	Kyle Dake	Wrestling	Men's freestyle 74 kg	August 10
Bronze	United States men's national water polo team: Alex Bowen; Luca Cupido; Hannes Daube; Chase Dodd; Ryder Dodd; Ben Hallock; Drew Holland; Johnny Hooper; Max Irving; Alex Obert; Marko Vavic; Adrian Weinberg; Dylan Woodhead	Water polo	Men's tournament	August 11

== Winter Olympics ==
=== 1992 Albertville ===
Medal	Name	Sport	Event	Date
Gold	Bonnie Blair	Speed skating	Women's 500 meters	February 10
Gold	Donna Weinbrecht	Freestyle skiing	Women's moguls	February 13
Gold	Bonnie Blair	Speed skating	Women's 1000 meters	February 14
Gold	Cathy Turner	Short track speed skating	Women's 500 meters	February 20
Gold	Kristi Yamaguchi	Figure skating	Ladies' singles	February 21
Silver	Hilary Lindh	Alpine skiing	Women's downhill	February 15
Silver	Paul Wylie	Figure skating	Men's singles	February 15
Silver	Diann Roffe	Alpine skiing	Women's giant slalom	February 19
Silver	Darcie Dohnal; Amy Peterson; Cathy Turner; Nikki Ziegelmeyer	Short track speed skating	Women's 3000 meter relay	February 20
Bronze	Nelson Carmichael	Freestyle skiing	Men's moguls	February 13
Bronze	Nancy Kerrigan	Figure skating	Ladies' singles	February 21

=== 1994 Lillehammer ===
Medal	Name	Sport	Event	Date
Gold	Tommy Moe	Alpine skiing	Men's downhill	February 13
Gold	Diann Roffe	Alpine skiing	Women's super-G	February 15
Gold	Dan Jansen	Speed skating	Men's 1000 meters	February 18
Gold	Bonnie Blair	Speed skating	Women's 500 meters	February 19
Gold	Bonnie Blair	Speed skating	Women's 1000 meters	February 23
Gold	Cathy Turner	Short track speed skating	Women's 500 meters	February 24
Silver	Picabo Street	Alpine skiing	Women's downhill	February 15
Silver	Elizabeth McIntyre	Freestyle skiing	Women's moguls	February 16
Silver	Tommy Moe	Alpine skiing	Men's super-G	February 17
Silver	Nancy Kerrigan	Figure skating	Ladies' singles	February 25
Silver	Randy Bartz; John Coyle; Eric Flaim; Andrew Gabel	Short track speed skating	Men's 5000 meter relay	February 26
Bronze	Amy Peterson	Short track speed skating	Women's 500 meters	February 24
Bronze	Karen Cashman; Amy Peterson; Cathy Turner; Nikki Ziegelmeyer	Short track speed skating	Women's 3000 meter relay	February 24

=== 1998 Nagano ===
Medal	Name	Sport	Event	Date
Gold	Picabo Street	Alpine skiing	Women's super-G	February 11
Gold	Jonny Moseley	Freestyle skiing	Men's moguls	February 11
Gold	United States women's national ice hockey team: Chris Bailey; Laurie Baker; Alana Blahoski; Lisa Brown-Miller; Karyn Bye; Colleen Coyne; Sara Decosta; Tricia Dunn-Luoma; Cammi Granato; Katie King; Shelley Looney; Sue Merz; Allison Mleczko; Tara Mounsey; Vicki Movsessian; Jenny Potter; Angela Ruggiero; Sarah Tueting; Gretchen Ulion; Sandra Whyte	Ice hockey	Women's tournament	February 17
Gold	Eric Bergoust	Freestyle skiing	Men's aerials	February 18
Gold	Nikki Stone	Freestyle skiing	Women's aerials	February 18
Gold	Tara Lipinski	Figure skating	Ladies' singles	February 20
Silver	Gordon Sheer; Chris Thorpe	Luge	Doubles	February 13
Silver	Chris Witty	Speed skating	Women's 1000 meters	February 19
Silver	Michelle Kwan	Figure skating	Ladies' singles	February 20
Bronze	Ross Powers	Snowboarding	Men's halfpipe	February 12
Bronze	Shannon Dunn-Downing	Snowboarding	Women's halfpipe	February 12
Bronze	Mark Grimmette; Brian Martin	Luge	Doubles	February 13
Bronze	Chris Witty	Speed skating	Women's 1500 meters	February 16

=== 2002 Salt Lake ===
Medal	Name	Sport	Event	Date
Gold	Kelly Clark	Snowboarding	Women's halfpipe	February 10
Gold	Ross Powers	Snowboarding	Men's halfpipe	February 11
Gold	Casey FitzRandolph	Speed skating	Men's 500 metres	February 12
Gold	Chris Witty	Speed skating	Women's 1000 metres	February 17
Gold	Jill Bakken; Vonetta Flowers	Bobsleigh	Two-woman	February 19
Gold	Derek Parra	Speed skating	Men's 1500 metres	February 19
Gold	Apolo Anton Ohno	Short track speed skating	Men's 1500 metres	February 20
Gold	Jimmy Shea	Skeleton	Men's	February 20
Gold	Tristan Gale	Skeleton	Women's	February 20
Gold	Sarah Hughes	Figure skating	Ladies' singles	February 21
Silver	Shannon Bahrke	Freestyle skiing	Women's moguls	February 9
Silver	Derek Parra	Speed skating	Men's 5000 metres	February 9
Silver	Danny Kass	Snowboarding	Men's halfpipe	February 11
Silver	Travis Mayer	Freestyle skiing	Men's moguls	February 12
Silver	Bode Miller	Alpine skiing	Men's combined	February 13
Silver	Mark Grimmette; Brian Martin	Luge	Doubles	February 15
Silver	Apolo Anton Ohno	Short track speed skating	Men's 1000 metres	February 16
Silver	Joe Pack	Freestyle skiing	Men's aerials	February 19
Silver	Lea Ann Parsley	Skeleton	Women's	February 20
Silver	Bode Miller	Alpine skiing	Men's giant slalom	February 21
Silver	United States women's national ice hockey team: Chris Bailey; Laurie Baker; Karyn Bye; Julie Chu; Natalie Darwitz; Sara Decosta; Tricia Dunn-Luoma; Cammi Granato; Courtney Kennedy; Andrea Kilbourne; Katie King; Shelley Looney; Sue Merz; Allison Mleczko; Tara Mounsey; Jenny Potter; Angela Ruggiero; Sarah Tueting; Lyndsay Wall; Krissy Wendell	Ice hockey	Women's tournament	February 21
Silver	Todd Hays; Garrett Hines; Randy Jones; Bill Schuffenhauer	Bobsleigh	Four-man	February 23
Silver	United States men's national ice hockey team: Tony Amonte; Tom Barrasso; Chris Chelios; Adam Deadmarsh; Chris Drury; Mike Dunham; Bill Guerin; Phil Housley; Brett Hull; John LeClair; Brian Leetch; Aaron Miller; Mike Modano; Tom Poti; Brian Rafalski; Mike Richter; Jeremy Roenick; Brian Rolston; Gary Suter; Keith Tkachuk; Doug Weight; Mike York; Scott Young	Ice hockey	Men's tournament	February 24
Bronze	Jarret Thomas	Snowboarding	Men's halfpipe	February 11
Bronze	Kip Carpenter	Speed skating	Men's 500 metres	February 12
Bronze	Timothy Goebel	Figure skating	Men's singles	February 14
Bronze	Clay Ives; Chris Thorpe	Luge	Doubles	February 15
Bronze	Chris Klug	Snowboarding	Men's parallel giant slalom	February 15
Bronze	Joey Cheek	Speed skating	Men's 1000 metres	February 16
Bronze	Jennifer Rodriguez	Speed skating	Women's 1000 metres	February 17
Bronze	Jennifer Rodriguez	Speed skating	Women's 1500 metres	February 20
Bronze	Michelle Kwan	Figure skating	Ladies' singles	February 21
Bronze	Mike Kohn; Doug Sharp; Brian Shimer; Dan Steele	Bobsleigh	Four-man	February 23
Bronze	Rusty Smith	Short track speed skating	Men's 500 metres	February 23

=== 2006 Turin ===
Medal	Name	Sport	Event	Date
Gold	Chad Hedrick	Speed skating	Men's 5000 meters	February 11
Gold	Shaun White	Snowboarding	Men's halfpipe	February 12
Gold	Hannah Teter	Snowboarding	Women's halfpipe	February 13
Gold	Joey Cheek	Speed skating	Men's 500 meters	February 13
Gold	Ted Ligety	Alpine skiing	Men's combined	February 14
Gold	Seth Wescott	Snowboarding	Men's snowboard cross	February 16
Gold	Shani Davis	Speed skating	Men's 1000 meters	February 18
Gold	Julia Mancuso	Alpine skiing	Women's giant slalom	February 24
Gold	Apolo Ohno	Short track speed skating	Men's 500 meters	February 25
Silver	Danny Kass	Snowboarding	Men's halfpipe	February 12
Silver	Gretchen Bleiler	Snowboarding	Women's halfpipe	February 13
Silver	Lindsey Jacobellis	Snowboarding	Women's snowboard cross	February 17
Silver	Joey Cheek	Speed skating	Men's 1000 meters	February 18
Silver	Tanith Belbin; Benjamin Agosto	Figure skating	Ice dance	February 20
Silver	Shauna Rohbock; Valerie Fleming	Bobsleigh	Two-woman	February 21
Silver	Shani Davis	Speed skating	Men's 1500 meters	February 21
Silver	Sasha Cohen	Figure skating	Ladies' singles	February 23
Silver	Chad Hedrick	Speed skating	Men's 10,000 meters	February 24
Bronze	Toby Dawson	Freestyle skiing	Men's moguls	February 15
Bronze	Apolo Ohno	Short track speed skating	Men's 1000 meters	February 18
Bronze	United States national women's ice hockey team: Caitlin Cahow; Julie Chu; Natalie Darwitz; Pam Dreyer; Tricia Dunn-Luoma; Molly Engstrom; Chanda Gunn; Jamie Hagerman; Kim Insalaco; Kathleen Kauth; Courtney Kennedy; Katie King; Kristin King; Sarah Parsons; Jenny Potter; Helen Resor; Angela Ruggiero; Kelly Stephens; Lyndsay Wall; Krissy Wendell	Ice hockey	Women's tournament	February 20
Bronze	Chad Hedrick	Speed skating	Men's 1500 meters	February 21
Bronze	Rosey Fletcher	Snowboarding	Women's parallel giant slalom	February 23
Bronze	Pete Fenson; Shawn Rojeski; Joseph Polo; John Shuster; Scott Baird	Curling	Men's tournament	February 24
Bronze	Alex Izykowski; J. P. Kepka; Apolo Ohno; Rusty Smith	Short track speed skating	Men's 5000 meter relay	February 25

=== 2010 Vancouver ===
Medal	Name	Sport	Event	Date
Gold	Hannah Kearney	Freestyle skiing	Women's moguls	February 13
Gold	Seth Wescott	Snowboarding	Men's snowboard cross	February 15
Gold	Lindsey Vonn	Alpine skiing	Women's downhill	February 17
Gold	Shaun White	Snowboarding	Men's halfpipe	February 17
Gold	Shani Davis	Speed skating	Men's 1000 meters	February 17
Gold	Evan Lysacek	Figure skating	Men's singles	February 18
Gold	Bode Miller	Alpine skiing	Men's combined	February 21
Gold	Bill Demong	Nordic combined	Individual large hill/10 km	February 25
Gold	Steve Holcomb; Steve Mesler; Curtis Tomasevicz; Justin Olsen	Bobsleigh	Four-man	February 27
Silver	Apolo Ohno	Short track speed skating	Men's 1500 meters	February 13
Silver	Johnny Spillane	Nordic combined	Individual normal hill/10 km	February 14
Silver	Julia Mancuso	Alpine skiing	Women's downhill	February 17
Silver	Julia Mancuso	Alpine skiing	Women's combined	February 18
Silver	Hannah Teter	Snowboarding	Women's halfpipe	February 18
Silver	Bode Miller	Alpine skiing	Men's super-G	February 19
Silver	Shani Davis	Speed skating	Men's 1500 meters	February 20
Silver	Meryl Davis; Charlie White	Figure skating	Ice dancing	February 22
Silver	Brett Camerota; Todd Lodwick; Bill Demong; Johnny Spillane	Nordic combined	Team competition	February 23
Silver	Jeret Peterson	Freestyle skiing	Men's aerials	February 25
Silver	United States women's national ice hockey team: Kacey Bellamy; Caitlin Cahow; Lisa Chesson; Julie Chu; Natalie Darwitz; Meghan Duggan; Molly Engstrom; Hilary Knight; Jocelyne Lamoureux; Monique Lamoureux; Erika Lawler; Gisele Marvin; Brianne McLaughlin; Jenny Potter; Angela Ruggiero; Molly Schaus; Kelli Stack; Karen Thatcher; Jessie Vetter; Kerry Weiland; Jinelle Zaugg-Siergiej	Ice hockey	Women's tournament	February 25
Silver	Johnny Spillane	Nordic combined	Individual large hill/10 km	February 25
Silver	Katherine Reutter	Short track speed skating	Women's 1000 meters	February 26
Silver	Chad Hedrick; Brian Hansen; Jonathan Kuck; Trevor Marsicano	Speed skating	Men's team pursuit	February 27
Silver	United States men's national ice hockey team: David Backes; Dustin Brown; Ryan Callahan; Chris Drury; Tim Gleason; Erik Johnson; Jack Johnson; Patrick Kane; Ryan Kesler; Phil Kessel; Jamie Langenbrunner; Ryan Malone; Ryan Miller; Brooks Orpik; Zach Parise; Joe Pavelski; Jonathan Quick; Brian Rafalski; Bobby Ryan; Paul Šťastný; Ryan Suter; Tim Thomas; Ryan Whitney	Ice hockey	Men's tournament	February 28
Bronze	Shannon Bahrke	Freestyle skiing	Women's moguls	February 13
Bronze	J. R. Celski	Short track speed skating	Men's 1500 meters	February 13
Bronze	Bryon Wilson	Freestyle skiing	Men's moguls	February 14
Bronze	Bode Miller	Alpine skiing	Men's downhill	February 15
Bronze	Scott Lago	Snowboarding	Men's halfpipe	February 17
Bronze	Chad Hedrick	Speed skating	Men's 1000 meters	February 17
Bronze	Kelly Clark	Snowboarding	Women's halfpipe	February 18
Bronze	Andrew Weibrecht	Alpine skiing	Men's super-G	February 19
Bronze	Lindsey Vonn	Alpine skiing	Women's super-G	February 20
Bronze	Apolo Ohno	Short track speed skating	Men's 1000 meters	February 20
Bronze	Erin Pac; Elana Meyers	Bobsleigh	Two-woman	February 24
Bronze	Allison Baver; Kimberly Derrick^{[a]} Alyson Dudek; Lana Gehring; Katherine Reutter	Short track speed skating	Women's 3000 meter relay	February 24
Bronze	J. R. Celski; Simon Cho^{[a]} Travis Jayner; Apolo Ohno; Jordan Malone	Short track speed skating	Men's 5000 meter relay	February 26

=== 2014 Sochi ===
Medal	Name	Sport	Event	Date
Gold	Sage Kotsenburg	Snowboarding	Men's slopestyle	February 8
Gold	Jamie Anderson	Snowboarding	Women's slopestyle	February 9
Gold	Kaitlyn Farrington	Snowboarding	Women's halfpipe	February 12
Gold	Joss Christensen	Freestyle skiing	Men's slopestyle	February 13
Gold	Meryl Davis; Charlie White	Figure skating	Ice dancing	February 17
Gold	David Wise	Freestyle skiing	Men's halfpipe	February 18
Gold	Ted Ligety	Alpine skiing	Men's giant slalom	February 19
Gold	Maddie Bowman	Freestyle skiing	Women's halfpipe	February 20
Gold	Mikaela Shiffrin	Alpine skiing	Women's slalom	February 21
Silver	Devin Logan	Freestyle skiing	Women's slopestyle	February 11
Silver	Gus Kenworthy	Freestyle skiing	Men's slopestyle	February 13
Silver	Noelle Pikus-Pace	Skeleton	Women's	February 14
Silver	Andrew Weibrecht	Alpine skiing	Men's super-G	February 16
Silver	Elana Meyers; Lauryn Williams	Bobsleigh	Two-woman	February 19
Silver	United States women's national ice hockey team: Kacey Bellamy; Megan Bozek; Alex Carpenter; Julie Chu; Kendall Coyne; Brianna Decker; Meghan Duggan; Lyndsey Fry; Amanda Kessel; Hilary Knight; Jocelyne Lamoureux; Monique Lamoureux-Kolls; Gisele Marvin; Brianne McLaughlin; Michelle Picard; Josephine Pucci; Molly Schaus; Anne Schleper; Kelli Stack; Lee Stecklein; Jessie Vetter	Ice hockey	Women's tournament	February 20
Silver	Eddy Alvarez; J. R. Celski; Chris Creveling; Jordan Malone	Short track speed skating	Men's 5000 meter relay	February 21
Silver	Steven Holcomb; Steven Langton	Bobsleigh	Two-man	February 17
Silver	Christopher Fogt; Steven Holcomb; Steven Langton; Curtis Tomasevicz	Bobsleigh	Four-man	February 23
Bronze	Hannah Kearney	Freestyle skiing	Women's moguls	February 8
Bronze	Jeremy Abbott^{[a]} Jason Brown; Marissa Castelli; Meryl Davis; Gracie Gold; Simon Shnapir; Ashley Wagner^{[a]} Charlie White	Figure skating	Team trophy	February 9
Bronze	Julia Mancuso	Alpine skiing	Women's combined	February 10
Bronze	Erin Hamlin	Luge	Women's singles	February 11
Bronze	Kelly Clark	Snowboarding	Women's halfpipe	February 12
Bronze	Nick Goepper	Freestyle skiing	Men's slopestyle	February 13
Bronze	Matthew Antoine	Skeleton	Men's	February 15
Bronze	Bode Miller	Alpine skiing	Men's super-G	February 16
Bronze	Alex Deibold	Snowboarding	Men's snowboard cross	February 18
Bronze	Aja Evans; Jamie Greubel	Bobsleigh	Two-woman	February 19

=== 2018 PyeongChang ===
Medal	Name	Sport	Event	Date
Gold	Red Gerard	Snowboarding	Men's slopestyle	February 11
Gold	Jamie Anderson	Snowboarding	Women's slopestyle	February 12
Gold	Chloe Kim	Snowboarding	Women's halfpipe	February 13
Gold	Shaun White	Snowboarding	Men's halfpipe	February 14
Gold	Mikaela Shiffrin	Alpine skiing	Women's giant slalom	February 15
Gold	Jessie Diggins; Kikkan Randall	Cross-country skiing	Women's team sprint	February 21
Gold	David Wise	Freestyle skiing	Men's halfpipe	February 22
Gold	United States women's national ice hockey team: Cayla Barnes; Kacey Bellamy; Hannah Brandt; Kendall Coyne; Dani Cameranesi; Brianna Decker; Meghan Duggan; Kali Flanagan; Nicole Hensley; Megan Keller; Amanda Kessel; Hilary Knight; Jocelyne Lamoureux-Davidson; Monique Lamoureux-Morando; Gigi Marvin; Sidney Morin; Kelly Pannek; Amanda Pelkey; Emily Pfalzer; Alex Rigsby; Maddie Rooney; Haley Skarupa; Lee Stecklein	Ice hockey	Women's tournament	February 22
Gold	Tyler George; Matt Hamilton; John Landsteiner; Joe Polo; John Shuster	Curling	Men's tournament	February 24
Silver	Chris Mazdzer	Luge	Men's singles	February 11
Silver	John-Henry Krueger	Short track speed skating	Men's 1000 meters	February 17
Silver	Nick Goepper	Freestyle skiing	Men's slopestyle	February 18
Silver	Lauren Gibbs; Elana Meyers Taylor	Bobsleigh	Two-woman	February 21
Silver	Mikaela Shiffrin	Alpine skiing	Women's combined	February 22
Silver	Alex Ferreira	Freestyle skiing	Men's halfpipe	February 22
Silver	Jamie Anderson	Snowboarding	Women's big air	February 22
Silver	Kyle Mack	Snowboarding	Men's big air	February 24
Bronze	Nathan Chen^{[a]} Alexa Scimeca Knierim; Chris Knierim; Mirai Nagasu; Adam Rippon; Alex Shibutani; Maia Shibutani; Bradie Tennell^{[a]}	Figure skating	Team event	February 12
Bronze	Arielle Gold	Snowboarding	Women's halfpipe	February 13
Bronze	Alex Shibutani; Maia Shibutani	Figure skating	Ice dancing	February 20
Bronze	Brita Sigourney	Freestyle skiing	Women's halfpipe	February 20
Bronze	Lindsey Vonn	Alpine skiing	Women's downhill	February 21
Bronze	Heather Bergsma; Brittany Bowe; Mia Manganello; Carlijn Schoutens^{[a]}	Speed skating	Women's team pursuit	February 21

=== 2022 Beijing ===
Medal	Name	Sport	Event	Date
Gold	Evan Bates; Karen Chen; Nathan Chen^{[a]} Madison Chock; Zachary Donohue^{[a]} Brandon Frazier; Madison Hubbell^{[a]} Alexa Knierim; Vincent Zhou	Figure skating	Team event	February 7
Gold	Lindsey Jacobellis	Snowboarding	Women's snowboard cross	February 9
Gold	Nathan Chen	Figure skating	Men's singles	February 10
Gold	Ashley Caldwell; Christopher Lillis; Justin Schoenefeld	Freestyle skiing	Mixed team aerials	February 10
Gold	Chloe Kim	Snowboarding	Women's halfpipe	February 10
Gold	Nick Baumgartner; Lindsey Jacobellis	Snowboarding	Mixed team snowboard cross	February 12
Gold	Erin Jackson	Speed skating	Women's 500 m	February 13
Gold	Kaillie Humphries	Bobsleigh	Women's monobob	February 14
Gold	Alex Hall	Freestyle skiing	Men's slopestyle	February 16
Silver	Jaelin Kauf	Freestyle skiing	Women's moguls	February 6
Silver	Julia Marino	Snowboarding	Women's slopestyle	February 6
Silver	Ryan Cochran-Siegle	Alpine skiing	Men's super-G	February 8
Silver	Colby Stevenson	Freestyle skiing	Men's big air	February 9
Silver	Elana Meyers Taylor	Bobsleigh	Women's monobob	February 14
Silver	Nick Goepper	Freestyle skiing	Men's slopestyle	February 16
Silver	United States women's national ice hockey team: Cayla Barnes; Megan Bozek; Hannah Brandt; Dani Cameranesi; Alex Carpenter; Alex Cavallini; Jesse Compher; Kendall Coyne Schofield; Brianna Decker; Jincy Dunne; Savannah Harmon; Caroline Harvey; Nicole Hensley; Megan Keller; Amanda Kessel; Hilary Knight; Abbey Murphy; Kelly Pannek; Maddie Rooney; Abby Roque; Hayley Scamurra; Lee Stecklein; Grace Zumwinkle	Ice hockey	Women's tournament	February 17
Silver	David Wise	Freestyle skiing	Men's halfpipe	February 19
Silver	Jessie Diggins	Cross-country skiing	Women's 30 km freestyle	February 20
Bronze	Jessie Diggins	Cross-country skiing	Women's sprint	February 8
Bronze	Zachary Donohue; Madison Hubbell	Figure skating	Ice dance	February 14
Bronze	Megan Nick	Freestyle skiing	Women's aerials	February 14
Bronze	Ethan Cepuran^{[a]} Casey Dawson; Emery Lehman; Joey Mantia	Speed skating	Men's team pursuit	February 15
Bronze	Brittany Bowe	Speed skating	Women's 1000 m	February 17
Bronze	Sylvia Hoffman; Elana Meyers Taylor	Bobsleigh	Two-woman	February 19
Bronze	Alex Ferreira	Freestyle skiing	Men's halfpipe	February 19

=== 2026 Milano Cortina ===
Medal	Name	Sport	Event	Date
Gold	Breezy Johnson	Alpine skiing	Women's downhill	February 8
Gold	Evan Bates; Madison Chock; Amber Glenn; Ellie Kam; Alysa Liu*; Ilia Malinin; Daniel O'Shea	Figure skating	Team event	February 8
Gold	Elizabeth Lemley	Freestyle skiing	Women's moguls	February 11
Gold	Jordan Stolz	Speed skating	Men's 1000 m	February 11
Gold	Jordan Stolz	Speed skating	Men's 500 m	February 14
Gold	Elana Meyers Taylor	Bobsleigh	Women's monobob	February 16
Gold	Mikaela Shiffrin	Alpine skiing	Women's slalom	February 18
Gold	Alysa Liu	Figure skating	Women's singles	February 19
Gold	United States women's national ice hockey team: Cayla Barnes; Hannah Bilka; Alex Carpenter; Kendall Coyne Schofield; Britta Curl-Salemme; Joy Dunne; Laila Edwards; Aerin Frankel; Rory Guilday; Caroline Harvey; Taylor Heise; Tessa Janecke; Megan Keller; Hilary Knight; Ava McNaughton; Abbey Murphy; Kelly Pannek; Gwyneth Philips; Hayley Scamurra; Kirsten Simms; Lee Stecklein; Haley Winn; Grace Zumwinkle	Ice hockey	Women's tournament	February 19
Gold	Alex Ferreira	Freestyle skiing	Men's halfpipe	February 20
Gold	Connor Curran; Kaila Kuhn; Christopher Lillis	Freestyle skiing	Mixed team aerials	February 21
Gold	United States men's national ice hockey team: Matt Boldy; Kyle Connor; Jack Eichel; Brock Faber; Jake Guentzel; Noah Hanifin; Connor Hellebuyck; Jack Hughes; Quinn Hughes; Clayton Keller; Jackson LaCombe; Dylan Larkin; Auston Matthews; Charlie McAvoy; J. T. Miller; Brock Nelson; Jake Oettinger; Jake Sanderson; Jaccob Slavin; Jeremy Swayman; Tage Thompson; Brady Tkachuk; Matthew Tkachuk; Vincent Trocheck; Zach Werenski	Ice hockey	Men's tournament	February 22
Silver	Ben Ogden	Cross-country skiing	Men's sprint	February 10
Silver	Korey Dropkin; Cory Thiesse	Curling	Mixed doubles	February 10
Silver	Alex Hall	Freestyle skiing	Men's slopestyle	February 10
Silver	Ryan Cochran-Siegle	Alpine skiing	Men's super-G	February 11
Silver	Evan Bates; Madison Chock	Figure skating	Ice dance	February 11
Silver	Jaelin Kauf	Freestyle skiing	Women's moguls	February 11
Silver	Chloe Kim	Snowboarding	Women's halfpipe	February 12
Silver	Jaelin Kauf	Freestyle skiing	Women's dual moguls	February 14
Silver	Mac Forehand	Freestyle skiing	Men's big air	February 17
Silver	Ethan Cepuran; Casey Dawson; Emery Lehman	Speed skating	Men's team pursuit	February 17
Silver	Ben Ogden; Gus Schumacher	Cross-country skiing	Men's team sprint	February 18
Silver	Jordan Stolz	Speed skating	Men's 1500 m	February 19
Bronze	Paula Moltzan; Jacqueline Wiles	Alpine skiing	Women's team combined	February 10
Bronze	Ashley Farquharson	Luge	Women's singles	February 10
Bronze	Jessie Diggins	Cross-country skiing	Women's 10 km freestyle	February 12
Bronze	Elizabeth Lemley	Freestyle skiing	Women's dual moguls	February 14
Bronze	Kaillie Humphries	Bobsleigh	Women's monobob	February 16
Bronze	Jake Canter	Snowboarding	Men's slopestyle	February 18
Bronze	Corinne Stoddard	Short-track speed skating	Women's 1500 m	February 20
Bronze	Kaillie Humphries; Jasmine Jones	Bobsleigh	Two-woman	February 21
Bronze	Mia Manganello	Speed skating	Women's mass start	February 21
