= Rowing at the 1996 Summer Olympics – Women's coxless pair =

Women's coxless pair at the Games of the XXVI Olympiad
- Date: 21–27 July 1996
- Competitors: 26 from 13 nations

Medalists
1st place, gold medalist(s)		Megan Still; Kate Slatter	Australia
2nd place, silver medalist(s)		Karen Kraft; Melissa Schwen	United States
3rd place, bronze medalist(s)		Christine Gossé; Hélène Cortin	France

The women's coxless pair competition at the 1996 Summer Olympics in Atlanta, Georgia took place at Lake Lanier.

== Results ==
=== Heats ===
The first 3 places of each heat advanced to semifinals, the remaining go to the repechage.

==== Heat 1 ====
Rank	Rower	Country	Time	Notes
1	Megan Still; Kate Slatter	Australia	7:26.92	Q
2	Kathrin Haacker; Stefani Werremeier	Germany	7:28.65	Q
3	Elien Meijer; Anneke Venema	Netherlands	7:43.58	Q
4	Helen Fleming; Colleen Orsmond	South Africa	7:48.69	R
5	Lorena Corengia; Julieta Ramírez	Argentina	8:12.58	R

==== Heat 2 ====
Rank	Rower	Country	Time	Notes
1	Christine Gossé; Hélène Cortin	France	7:31.91	Q
2	Albina Ligatcheva; Vera Pochitayeva	Russia	7:42.76	Q
3	Liliana Cazac; Angela Cazac	Romania	7:49.94	Q
4	Kate Mackenzie; Philippa Cross	Great Britain	8:03.53	R

==== Heat 3 ====
Rank	Rower	Country	Time	Notes
1	Karen Kraft; Melissa Schwen	United States	7:34.29	Q
2	Emma Robinson; Anna van der Kamp	Canada	7:39.98	Q
3	Liang Xiling; Jing Yanhua	China	7:46.80	Q
4	Sabina Telenská; Hana Dariusová	Czech Republic	7:54.72	R

=== Repechage ===
The first three places of the repechage advanced to the semifinals, and the remaining team was eliminated.

==== Repechage ====
Rank	Rower	Country	Time	Notes
1	Sabina Telenská; Hana Dariusová	Czech Republic	8:01.50	Q
2	Helen Fleming; Colleen Orsmond	South Africa	8:11.90	Q
3	Kate Mackenzie; Philippa Cross	Great Britain	7:43.58	Q
4	Lorena Corengia; Julieta Ramírez	Argentina	8:35.53	

=== Semifinals ===
The first three places of the semifinal advanced to the Final A, and the remaining to Final B.

==== Semifinal 1 ====
Rank	Rower	Country	Time	Notes
1	Karen Kraft; Melissa Schwen	United States	7:29.31	A
2	Megan Still; Kate Slatter	Australia	7:32.47	A
3	Albina Ligatcheva; Vera Pochitayeva	Russia	7:36.37	A
4	Liang Xiling; Jing Yanhua	China	7:36.40	B
5	Elien Meijer; Anneke Venema	Netherlands	7:48.40	B
6	Helen Fleming; Colleen Orsmond	South Africa	7:56.41	B

==== Semifinal 2 ====
Rank	Rower	Country	Time	Notes
1	Christine Gossé; Hélène Cortin	France	7:30.21	A
2	Emma Robinson; Anna van der Kamp	Canada	7:32.02	A
3	Kathrin Haacker; Stefani Werremeier	Germany	7:34.80	A
4	Liliana Cazac; Angela Cazac	Romania	7:44.47	B
5	Sabina Telenská; Hana Dariusová	Czech Republic	7:48.40	B
6	Kate Mackenzie; Philippa Cross	Great Britain	7:59.57	B

=== Finals ===
==== Final B ====
Rank	Rower	Country	Time
6	Liang Xiling; Jing Yanhua	China	7:15.41
7	Elien Meijer; Anneke Venema	Netherlands	7:17.26
8	Sabina Telenská; Hana Dariusová	Czech Republic	7:20.24
9	Liliana Cazac; Angela Cazac	Romania	7:20.60
10	Helen Fleming; Colleen Orsmond	South Africa	7:28.30
11	Kate Mackenzie; Philippa Cross	Great Britain	7:34.68

==== Final A ====
Rank	Rower	Country	Time
1	Megan Still; Kate Slatter	Australia	7:01.39
2	Karen Kraft; Melissa Schwen	United States	7:01.78
3	Christine Gossé; Hélène Cortin	France	7:03.82
4	Kathrin Haacker; Stefani Werremeier	Germany	7:08.49
5	Emma Robinson; Anna van der Kamp	Canada	7:12.27
~~6~~	Albina Ligatcheva; Vera Pochitayeva	Russia	DQ
