= Rowing at the 2000 Summer Olympics – Women's coxless pair =

Women's coxless pair at the Games of the XXVII Olympiad
- Venue: Sydney International Regatta Centre
- Date: 17–23 September 2000
- Competitors: 20 from 10 nations
- Winning time: 7:11.00

Medalists
| 1st place, gold medalist(s) | | Georgeta Damian; Doina Ignat | Romania |
| 2nd place, silver medalist(s) | | Kate Slatter; Rachael Taylor | Australia |
| 3rd place, bronze medalist(s) | | Karen Kraft; Melissa Ryan | United States |

The women's coxless pair competition at the 2000 Summer Olympics in Sydney, Australia took place at Sydney International Regatta Centre.

== Competition format ==
This rowing event was a sweep event, meaning that each rower has one oar and rows on only one side. Two rowers crewed each boat, with no coxswain. The competition consists of multiple rounds. Finals were held to determine the placing of each boat; these finals were given letters with those nearer to the beginning of the alphabet meaning a better ranking. Semifinals were named based on which finals they fed, with each semifinal having two possible finals.

With 10 boats in heats, the best boats qualify directly for "Final A". All other boats progress to the repechage round, which offers a second chance to qualify for "Final A". Unsuccessful boats from the repechage must proceed to final B, which determines the last four places, from 7–10. The final ranking for this event was based on the order of finish. The top three teams earned Olympic medals for placing first, second, and third, while the remaining "Final A" teams placed fourth through sixth, according to their final finish.

== Schedule ==
All times are Australian Time (UTC+10)

| Date | Time | Round |
|---|---|---|
| Sunday, 17 September 2000 | 09:50 | Heats |
| Tuesday, 19 September 2000 | 09:50 | Repechages |
| Friday, 22 September 2000 | 10:30 | Final B |
| Saturday, 23 September 2000 | 09:10 | Final |

== Results ==
=== Heats ===
The winner of each heat advanced to Final A, remainder goes to the repechage.

==== Heat 1 ====
| Rank | Rower | Country | Time | Notes |
|---|---|---|---|---|
| 1 | Georgeta Damian; Doina Ignat | Romania | 7:16.22 | Q |
| 2 | Karen Kraft; Melissa Ryan | United States | 7:18.74 | R |
| 3 | Claudia Barth; Lenka Wech | Germany | 7:20.23 | R |
| 4 | Yevheniya Andrieieva; Nina Proskura | Ukraine | 7:30.82 | R |
| 5 | Marloes Bolman; Femke Dekker | Netherlands | 7:47.99 | R |

==== Heat 2 ====
| Rank | Rower | Country | Time | Notes |
|---|---|---|---|---|
| 1 | Helen Fleming; Colleen Orsmond | South Africa | 7:17.83 | Q |
| 2 | Kate Slatter; Rachael Taylor | Australia | 7:20.69 | R |
| 3 | Theresa Luke; Emma Robinson | Canada | 7:20.84 | R |
| 4 | Albina Ligatcheva; Vera Pochitaeva | Russia | 7:22.69 | R |
| 5 | Dot Blackie; Cath Bishop | Great Britain | 7:40.73 | R |

=== Repechage ===
First two qualify to Final A, the remainder to final B.

==== Repechage 1 ====
| Rank | Rower | Country | Time | Notes |
|---|---|---|---|---|
| 1 | Karen Kraft; Melissa Ryan | United States | 7:21.00 | A |
| 2 | Theresa Luke; Emma Robinson | Canada | 7:24.69 | A |
| 3 | Yevheniya Andrieieva; Nina Proskura | Ukraine | 7:31.11 | B |
| 4 | Dot Blackie; Cath Bishop | Great Britain | 7:36.53 | B |

==== Repechage 2 ====
| Rank | Rower | Country | Time | Notes |
|---|---|---|---|---|
| 1 | Kate Slatter; Rachael Taylor | Australia | 7:19.79 | A |
| 2 | Claudia Barth; Lenka Wech | Germany | 7:20.12 | A |
| 3 | Albina Ligatcheva; Vera Pochitaeva | Russia | 7:20.51 | B |
| 4 | Marloes Bolman; Femke Dekker | Netherlands | 7:40.00 | B |

=== Finals ===
==== Final B ====
| Rank | Rower | Country | Time | Notes |
|---|---|---|---|---|
| 1 | Albina Ligatcheva; Vera Pochitaeva | Russia | 7:17.87 | |
| 2 | Yevheniya Andrieieva; Nina Proskura | Ukraine | 7:20.82 | |
| 3 | Dot Blackie; Cath Bishop | Great Britain | 7:26.95 | |
| 4 | Marloes Bolman; Femke Dekker | Netherlands | 7:27.22 | |

==== Final A ====
| Rank | Rower | Country | Time | Notes |
|---|---|---|---|---|
| 1st place, gold medalist(s) | Georgeta Damian; Doina Ignat | Romania | 7:11.00 | |
| 2nd place, silver medalist(s) | Kate Slatter; Rachael Taylor | Australia | 7:12.56 | |
| 3rd place, bronze medalist(s) | Karen Kraft; Melissa Ryan | United States | 7:13.00 | |
| 4 | Theresa Luke; Emma Robinson | Canada | 7:15.48 | |
| 5 | Helen Fleming; Colleen Orsmond | South Africa | 7:16.84 | |
| 6 | Claudia Barth; Lenka Wech | Germany | 7:20.08 | |
