= Julieta Ramírez =

Julieta Ramírez may refer to:

- Julieta Ramírez (rower) (born 1974), Argentine rower
- Julieta Ramírez (politician) (born 1995), Mexican politician
