= Ligachyov =

Ligachyov, Ligachev , Ligachov, or Ligatchev (Russian: Лигачёв) is a Russian masculine surname; its feminine counterparts are Ligachyova, Ligacheva, Ligachova, or Ligatcheva. The surname may refer to the following notable people:

- Albina Ligatcheva (born 1969), Russian rower
- Nataliia Ligachova-Chernolutska (born 1962), Ukrainian journalist and public figure
- Yegor Ligachev (1920–2021), Soviet and Russian politician
