= Karen Kraft =

American rower

Personal information
- Born: May 3, 1969 (age 57) San Mateo, California, U.S.
Medal record
Women's rowing
Representing United States
Olympic Games
Silver medal – second place	1996 Atlanta	Coxless pair
Bronze medal – third place	2000 Sydney	Coxless pair
World Championships
Silver medal – second place	1995 Tampere	Coxless pair
Pan American Games
Silver medal – second place	1999 Winnipeg	Coxless pair

Karen Kraft (born May 3, 1969) is an American rower and two-time Olympic medal winner.

== Early life ==
Kraft graduated from Cal Poly in San Luis Obispo in 1991 with a degree in architecture.

== Olympics career ==
Kraft won a silver medal at the 1996 Atlanta Games for coxless pair rowing (via 7:01.78 with Missy Schwen), and later won bronze in the same event at the 2000 Olympics (in 7:13).

== Coaching ==
She was a university assistant coach for women's rowing at the University of Wisconsin-Madison from 2007 to 2013. She is a yoga teacher at Inner Fire Yoga and a personal trainer at Functional Integrated Training in Madison.
