= Christine Gossé =

French rower (born 1964)

Medal record

Women's rowing

Representing France

Olympic Games
Bronze medal – third place	1996 Atlanta	Coxless pair

World Rowing Championships
Gold medal – first place	1993 Račice	Coxless pair
Gold medal – first place	1994 Indianapolis	Coxless pair
Bronze medal – third place	1995 Tampere	Coxless pair

Christine Gossé (born 26 October 1964 in Offenburg, Germany) is a French rower.
