= Marloes Bolman =

Dutch rower (born 1977)

Personal information
- Nationality: Dutch
- Born: 8 November 1977 (age 47) Harlingen, Netherlands

Sport
- Sport: Rowing

Marloes Bolman (born 8 November 1977) is a Dutch rower. She competed in the women's coxless pair event at the 2000 Summer Olympics.
