= Claudia Barth =

German rower (born 1975)

Personal information
- Nationality: German
- Born: 28 January 1975 (age 51) Ulm, West Germany

Sport
- Sport: Rowing

Claudia Barth (born 28 January 1975) is a former German rower. She competed in the women's coxless pair event at the 2000 Summer Olympics.
