= Nina Proskura =

Ukrainian rower (born 1974)

Personal information
- Nationality: Ukrainian
- Born: 1 November 1974 (age 51) Zaporizhia, Ukrainian SSR, Soviet Union

Sport
- Sport: Rowing
Medal record
Women's rowing
Representing Ukraine
World Rowing Championships
Gold medal – first place	1998 Cologne	Coxless four

Nina Proskura (born 1 November 1974) is a Ukrainian rower. She competed in the women's coxless pair event at the 2000 Summer Olympics.
