= Lorena Corengia =

Argentine rower

Personal information
- Full name: Lorena Betina Corengia
- Nationality: Argentine
- Born: 20 March 1974 (age 51)

Sport
- Sport: Rowing

Lorena Betina Corengia (born 20 March 1974) is an Argentine rower. She competed in the women's coxless pair event at the 1996 Summer Olympics.
