= Hana Dariusová =

Czech rower (born 1973)

Personal information
- Born: 30 April 1973 (age 52); Hořovice, Czechoslovakia
- Height: 177 cm (5 ft 10 in)
- Weight: 65 kg (143 lb)
- Spouse: John Parker

Sport
- Sport: Rowing

Hana Dariusová (born 30 April 1973) is a Czech rower. She competed at the 1992 Summer Olympics in Barcelona for Czechoslovakia with the women's eight where she came eighth. At the 1996 Summer Olympics in Atlanta, she competed for the Czech Republic in the coxless pair where they came ninth.

Dariusová is married to the rower and coach John Parker who had also competed at the 1992 Summer Olympics.
