= Jing Yanhua =

Chinese rower

Personal information
- Native name: 景艳华
- Nationality: Chinese
- Born: 12 June 1973 (age 53)

Sport
- Sport: Rowing

Jing Yanhua (born 12 June 1973) is a Chinese rower. She competed In the women's coxless pair event at the 1996 Summer Olympics.
