= Liliana Cazac =

Romanian rower

Personal information
- Nationality: Romanian
- Born: 16 June 1976 (age 50) Moldovean, Moldova
- Relatives: Angela Cazac (sister)

Sport
- Sport: Rowing

Liliana Cazac (born 16 June 1976) is a Romanian rower. She competed in the women's coxless pair event teamed with her sister Angela Cazac at the 1996 Summer Olympics.
