= Sabina Telenská =

Czech rower (born 1974)

Personal information
- Born: 14 April 1974 (age 51); Prague, Czechoslovakia
- Height: 177 cm (5 ft 10 in)
- Weight: 77 kg (170 lb)

Sport
- Sport: Rowing

Sabina Telenská (born 14 April 1974) is a Czech rower. She competed at the 1992 Summer Olympics in Barcelona for Czechoslovakia with the women's eight where they came eighths. At the 1996 Summer Olympics in Atlanta, she competed for the Czech Republic in the coxless pair where they came ninth.
