= Yevheniya Andrieieva =

Ukrainian rower

Personal information
- Full name: Yevheniya Serhiïvna Andrieieva
- Nationality: Ukrainian
- Born: 16 February 1976 (age 50) Dnipropetrovsk, Ukrainian SSR, Soviet Union

Sport
- Sport: Rowing
Medal record
Women's rowing
Representing Ukraine
World Rowing Championships
Gold medal – first place	1998 Cologne	Coxless four

Yevheniya Serhiïvna Andrieieva (Ukrainian: Євгенія Сергіївна Андрєєва; born 16 February 1976) is a Ukrainian rower. She competed in the women's coxless pair event at the 2000 Summer Olympics.
