= Angela Cazac =

Romanian rower

Personal information
- Nationality: Romanian
- Born: 13 June 1971 (age 55) Ciobanovca, Moldova
- Relatives: Liliana Cazac (sister)

Sport
- Sport: Rowing

Angela Cazac (born 13 June 1971) is a Romanian rower. She competed in the women's coxless pair event teamed with her sister Liliana Cazac at the 1996 Summer Olympics.
