= Hélène Cortin =

French rower (born 1972)

Medal record

Women's rowing

Representing France

Olympic Games
Bronze medal – third place	1996 Atlanta	Coxless pair

World Rowing Championships
Gold medal – first place	1993 Račice	Coxless pair
Gold medal – first place	1994 Indianapolis	Coxless pair

Hélène Cortin (born 7 February 1972 in Dunkirk) is a French rower.
