= Lenka Wech =

German rower (born 1976)

Medal record

Women's rowing

Representing Germany

World Rowing Championships
Gold medal – first place	2003 Milan	Eight
Silver medal – second place	2006 Eton	Eight
Bronze medal – third place	1996 Strathclyde	Coxless four
Bronze medal – third place	2001 Lucerne	Eight
Bronze medal – third place	2002 Seville	Eight

European Rowing Championships
Gold medal – first place	2007 Poznań	Coxless pair

Lenka Wech (born 9 April 1976 in Falkenau) is a German rower.
