= Julieta Ramírez (rower) =

Argentine rower

Personal information
- Full name: Julieta Monica Ramírez
- Nationality: Argentine
- Born: 5 July 1974 (age 52)

Sport
- Sport: Rowing
Medal record
Representing Argentina
Pan American Games
Bronze medal – third place	1995 Mar del Plata	Coxless pairs

Julieta Mónica Ramírez (born 5 July 1974) is an Argentine rower. She competed in the women's coxless pair event at the 1996 Summer Olympics.
