= Kate Mackenzie (British rower) =

British rower

Personal information
- Nationality: British
- Born: 26 February 1967 (age 58); London, England

Sport
- Sport: Rowing

Kate Mackenzie (born 26 February 1967) is a British rower. She competed at the 1996 Summer Olympics and the 2000 Summer Olympics.
