= Albina Ligatcheva =

Russian rower

Albina Ligachova
Personal information
- Born: 18 October 1969 (age 56) Lipetsk, Russia
- Height: 1.80 m (5 ft 11 in)
- Weight: 77 kg (170 lb)

Sport
- Country: Russia
- Sport: Rowing
Medal record
Women's rowing
Representing Russia
World Championships
Silver medal – second place	1997 Lac d'Aiguebelette	Women's pair

Albina Ligatcheva, also Ligachova, Ligacheva (Russian: Альбина Альбертовна Лигачёва, romanized: Albina Albertovna Ligachyova; born 18 October 1969 in Lipetsk, Russia) is a Russian rower. She competed in the women's coxless pair at the 2000 Summer Olympics. She also won a bronze medal at the 1997 World Rowing Championships.

She is a 16 times champion of Russia in rowing. As of 2026, she is a senior instructor of the Department of Physical Education, Far Eastern Federal University. She was awarded the President's order "For Merit in Sports"
