= Missy Schwen-Ryan =

American rower and Olympic medalist

Missy Schwen Ryan
Personal information
- Born: Melissa C. Schwen; July 17, 1972 (age 54) Bloomington, Indiana, U.S.
Medal record
Women's rowing
Representing United States
Olympic Games
Silver medal – second place	1996 Atlanta	Coxless pair
Bronze medal – third place	2000 Sydney	Coxless pair
World Rowing Championships
Silver medal – second place	1995 Tampere	Coxless pair

Melissa C. Schwen Ryan (born July 17, 1972, in Bloomington, Indiana) is an American rower. After her first medal in the 1996 Atlanta Olympics, she donated a kidney to her sick brother in need of a transplant. On March 20, 2010, she was inducted into the National Rowing Hall of Fame.
