= Vera Pochitayeva =

Russian rower

Personal information
- Full name: Vera Vasilyevna Pochitayeva
- Nationality: Russian
- Born: 29 August 1974 (age 52) Lipetsk, Russia

Sport
- Sport: Rowing

Vera Vasilyevna Pochitayeva (Russian: Вера Васильевна Почитаева; born 29 August 1974) is a Russian rower. She competed at the 1996 Summer Olympics and the 2000 Summer Olympics in the coxless pair events.
