= Colleen Orsmond =

South African rower

Personal information
- Nationality: South African
- Born: 20 June 1973 (age 51); Johannesburg, South Africa

Sport
- Sport: Rowing

Colleen Orsmond (born 20 June 1973) is a South African rower. She competed at the 1996 Summer Olympics and the 2000 Summer Olympics.
