= Spain at the 1996 Summer Olympics =

- IOC code: ESP
- NOC: Spanish Olympic Committee
- Website: www.coe.es (in Spanish)

in Atlanta
- Competitors: 289 (194 men and 95 women) in 22 sports
- Flag bearer: Luís Doreste
- Medals Ranked 13th: Gold 5 Silver 6 Bronze 6 Total 17

Summer Olympics appearances (overview)
- 1900; 1904–1912; 1920; 1924; 1928; 1932; 1936; 1948; 1952; 1956; 1960; 1964; 1968; 1972; 1976; 1980; 1984; 1988; 1992; 1996; 2000; 2004; 2008; 2012; 2016; 2020; 2024

Spain, the previous host of the 1992 Summer Olympics in Barcelona, competed at the 1996 Summer Olympics in Atlanta, United States. 289 competitors, 194 men and 95 women, took part in 157 events in 22 sports.

== Medalists ==
Medal	Name	Sport	Event	Date
Gold	José Luis Ballester; Fernando León	Sailing	Tornado	July 23
Gold	Begoña Vía Dufresne; Theresa Zabell	Sailing	Women's 470	July 24
Gold	Spain men's national water polo team: Ángel Andreo; Carles Sans; Daniel Ballart; Ivan Moro; Jesús Rollán; Jordi Sans; Jorge Payá; Josep María Abarca; Manuel Estiarte; Miguel Ángel Oca; Pedro Francisco García; Salvador Gómez; Sergi Pedrerol	Water polo	Water polo	July 28
Gold	Lorena Guréndez; Tania Lamarca; Estíbaliz Martínez; Marta Baldó; Nuria Cabanillas; Estela Giménez	Gymnastics	Women's rhythmic team	August 2
Gold	Miguel Induráin	Cycling	Men's road time trial	August 3
Silver	Ernesto Pérez	Judo	Men's Heavyweight (+95 kg)	July 20
Silver	Arantxa Sánchez Vicario	Tennis	Women's singles	August 2
Silver	Spain men's national field hockey team: Jaume Amat; Pablo Amat; Javier Arnau; Jordi Arnau; Óscar Barrena; Ignacio Cobos; Juan Dinarés; Juan Escarré; Xavier Escudé; Juantxo García-Mauriño; Antonio González; Ramón Jufresa; Joaquín Malgosa; Víctor Pujol; Ramón Sala; Pablo Usoz	Field hockey	Men's tournament	August 2
Silver	Abraham Olano	Cycling	Men's road time trial	August 3
Silver	Sergi Bruguera	Tennis	Men's singles	August 3
Silver	Fermín Cacho	Athletics	Men's 1500 m	August 3
Bronze	Isabel Fernández	Judo	Women's Lightweight (56 kg)	July 24
Bronze	Yolanda Soler	Judo	Women's Extra Lightweight (48 kg)	July 26
Bronze	Conchita Martínez; Arantxa Sánchez Vicario	Tennis	Women's doubles	August 1
Bronze	Rafael Lozano	Boxing	Men's Light Flyweight (48 kg)	August 1
Bronze	Valentí Massana	Athletics	Men's 50 km walk	August 2
Bronze	Spain men's national handball team: Juan Pérez; Iñaki Urdangarín; Alberto Urdiales; José Hombrados; Jordi Núñez; Jesús Olalla; Raúl González; Rafael Guijosa; Fernando Hernández; Jesús Fernández; Jaume Fort; Mateo Garralda; Talant Duyshebaev; Salvador Esquer; Aitor Etxaburu	Handball	Men's tournament	August 4

Medals by sport
Sport	1st place, gold medalist(s)	2nd place, silver medalist(s)	3rd place, bronze medalist(s)	Total
Sailing	2	0	0	2
Cycling	1	1	0	2
Gymnastics	1	0	0	1
Water polo	1	0	0	1
Tennis	0	2	1	3
Judo	0	1	2	3
Athletics	0	1	1	2
Field hockey	0	1	0	1
Boxing	0	0	1	1
Handball	0	0	1	1
Total	5	6	6	17

== Archery ==
After their gold medal men's team performance four years earlier, Spain qualified only one archer for the 1996 Olympics. He lost his first match.

Men's individual competition:

- Antonio Vazquez → Round of 64, 60th place (0-1)

== Athletics ==
Men's 5,000 metres

- Enrique Molina

- Qualification — 13:51.55
- Semifinal — 14:04.08
- Final — 13:12.91 (→ 7th place)

- Manuel Pancorbo

- Qualification — 13:57.42
- Semifinal — 14:39.64 (→ did not advance)

- Anacleto Jiménez

- Qualification — 14:16.57
- Semifinal — 13:50.90 (→ did not advance)

Men's 400m hurdles

- Iñigo Monreal

- Heat — 52.23s (→ did not advance)

- Oscar Pitillas

- Heat — 51.35s (→ did not advance)

- Salvador Vila

- Heat — 50.55s (→ did not advance)

Men's 3,000 metres steeplechase

- Elisardo de la Torre

- Heat — 8:42.75 (→ did not advance)

Men's long jump

- Jesús Oliván

- Qualification — 7.64m (→ did not advance)

Men's discus throw

- David Martínez

- Qualification — NM (→ did not advance)

Men's decathlon

- Antonio Peñalver

- Final result — 8307 points (→ 2nd place)

- Francisco Javier Benet

- Final result — 8107 points (→ 19th place)

Men's marathon

- Martín Fiz — 2:13.20 (→ 4th place)
- Alberto Juzdado — 2:17.24 (→ 18th place)
- Diego García — 2:22.11 (→ 53rd place)

Men's 50 km walk

- Valentí Massana — 3'44:19 (→ Bronze medal)
- Jaime Barroso — 4'01:09 (→ 22nd place)
- Jesús Ángel García — did not finish (→ no ranking)

Men's competition

- Abel Antón
- Alejandro Gómez
- Andrés Manuel Díaz
- Arturo Ortiz
- Carlos de la Torre
- Carlos Sala
- Daniel Plaza
- Elisardo de la Torre
- Fermín Cacho
- Fernando Vázquez
- Francisco Javier Navarro
- Frutos Feo
- Isaac Viciosa
- Javier García
- Jesús Font
- Jordi Mayoral
- José Manuel Arcos
- Juan Gabriel Concepción
- Manuel Francisco Borrega
- Manuel Martínez
- Miguel de los Santos
- Reyes Estévez
- Roberto Parra
- Venancio José Murcia

Women's 10.000 metres

- Julia Vaquero

- Qualification — 32:27.05
- Final — 31:27.07 (→ 9th place)

Women's 400m hurdles

- Miriam Alonso

- Qualification — 56.53 (→ did not advance)

- Eva Paniagua

- Qualification — 58.10 (→ did not advance)

Women's heptathlon

- Inmaculada Clapés

- Final result — 5602 points (→ 24th place)

Women's marathon

- Rocío Ríos — 2:30.50 (→ 5th place)
- Mónica Pont — 2:33.27 (→ 14th place)
- Ana Isabel Alonso — 2:44.12 (→ 49th place)

Women's 10 km walk

- María Vasco — 46:09 (→ 28th place)
- Encarna Granados — did not finish (→ no ranking)

- Ana Amelia Menéndez
- Cristina Petite
- Julia Vaquero
- María Concepción Paredes
- María Isabel Martínez
- María José Mardomingo
- María Teresa Zúñiga
- Marta Domínguez
- Sandra Myers

== Beach volleyball ==
- Javier Bosma and Sixto Jimenez — 7th place overall
- Miguel Prieto and José Yuste — 17th place overall

== Boxing ==
Men's flyweight (– 48 kg)

- Rafael Lozano → Bronze medal

- First round — Defeated Joseph Benhard (Namibia), 10-2
- Second round — Defeated Masibulele Makepula (South Africa), 14-3
- Quarterfinals — Defeated La Paene Masara (Indonesia), 10-9
- Semifinals — Lost to Mansueto Velasco (Philippines), 10-22

== Cycling ==
=== Road competition ===
Men's individual time trial

- Miguel Induráin

- Final — 1:04:05 (→ Gold medal)

- Abraham Olano

- Final — 1:04:17 (→ Silver medal)

Women's individual road race

- Joane Somarriba

- Final — 02:37:06 (→ 21st place)

- Fátima Blázquez

- Final — 02:46:27 (→ 40th place)

- Izaskun Bengoa

- Final — did not finish (→ no ranking)

Women's individual time trial

- Joane Somarriba

- Final — 38:55 (→ 13th place)

=== Track competition ===
Men's points race

- Juan Llaneras

- Final — 17 points (→ 6th place)

=== Mountain bike ===
Men's cross-country

- Jokin Mújika

- Final — 2:41:15 (→ 22nd place)

Women's cross-country

- Laura Blanco

- Final — 2:04.20 (→ 20th place)

- Silvia Rovira

- Final — 2:09.17 (→ 26th place)

== Diving ==
Men's 3m springboard

- José Miguel Gil

- Preliminary heat — 295.47 (→ did not advance, 31st place)

- Rafael Álvarez

- Preliminary heat — 208.83 (→ did not advance, 36th place)

Women's 3m springboard

- Julia Cruz

- Preliminary heat — 205.32 (→ did not advance, 26th place)

Women's 10m platform

- Dolores Sáez

- Preliminary heat — 216.36 (→ did not advance, 27th place)

== Fencing ==
Eleven fencers, nine men and two women, represented Spain in 1996.

Men's foil

- Javier García
- José Francisco Guerra

Men's épée

- César González
- Oscar Fernández
- Fernando de la Peña

Men's team épée

- Oscar Fernández, César González, Raúl Maroto

Men's sabre

- Fernando Medina
- Raúl Peinador
- Antonio García

Men's team sabre

- Antonio García, Fernando Medina, Raúl Peinador

Women's épée

- Taymi Chappé
- Rosa María Castillejo

== Hockey ==
=== Men's tournament ===
- Preliminary round (Group A):

- Spain — Germany 1-0
- Spain — Pakistan 3-0
- Spain — Argentina 2-1
- Spain — United States 7-1
- Spain — India 1-3

- Semifinals:

- Spain — Australia 2-1

- Final:

- Spain — Netherlands 1-3 → Silver medal

- Team roster

- Jaume Amat
- Pablo Amat
- Javier Arnau
- Jordi Arnau
- Óscar Barrena
- Ignacio Cobos
- Juan Dinarés
- Juan Escarré
- Xavier Escudé
- Juantxo García-Mauriño
- Antonio González
- Ramón Jufresa
- Joaquín Malgosa
- Víctor Pujol
- Ramón Sala
- Pablo Usoz

=== Women's tournament ===
- Preliminary round robin:

- Spain — Australia 0-4
- Spain — Germany 1-2
- Spain — Argentina 0-1
- Spain — Great Britain 2-2
- Spain — South Korea 0-2
- Spain — Netherlands 2-4
- Spain — United States 0-2 (→ 8th and last place)

- Team roster

- Begoña Larzabal
- Elena Carrión
- Elena Urkizu
- Lucía López
- María Carmen Barea
- María Cruz González
- María Victoria González
- Maider Tellería
- María del Mar Feito
- Mónica Rueda
- Nagore Gabellanes
- Natalia Dorado
- Silvia Manrique
- Sonia Barrio
- Sonia de Ignacio
- Teresa Motos

== Judo ==
Men's competition

- Ernesto Pérez
- José Tomás Toro
- León Villar
- Roberto Naveira

Women's competition

- Almudena Muñoz
- Cristina Curto
- Isabel Fernández
- Sara Alvarez
- Yolanda Soler

== Rowing ==
Men

Athlete	Event	Heats		Repechage		Semifinals		Final	
Athlete	Event	Time	Rank	Time	Rank	Time	Rank	Time	Rank
Melquiades Verduras; José Antonio Merín	Men's double sculls	7:13.99	5 R	6:59.57	4 FD	BYE		6:55.00	18
Jose Maria de Marco; Juan Carlos Sáez	Men's lightweight double sculls	6:46.66	1 Q	BYE		6:29.37	3 FA	6:28.09	4
Fernando Climent; David Morales; Juan Manuel Florido; Alfredo Girón	Men's lightweight coxless four	6:28.05	4 R	6:03.33	4 FC	BYE		6:25.81	14

Women

Athlete	Event	Heats		Repechage		Semifinals		Final	
Athlete	Event	Time	Rank	Time	Rank	Time	Rank	Time	Rank
Anna Accensi; Esperanza Márquez; Nuria Domínguez	Women's lightweight double sculls	7:51.05	4 R	7:12.96	4 FC	BYE		7:55.84	16

Qualification Legend: FA=Final A (medal); FB=Final B (non-medal); FC=Final C (non-medal); FD=Final D (non-medal); FE=Final E (non-medal); FF=Final F (non-medal); SA/B=Semifinals A/B; SC/D=Semifinals C/D; SE/F=Semifinals E/F; QF=Quarterfinals; R=Repechage

== Sailing ==
Men

Athlete	Event	Race											Net points	Final rank
Athlete	Event	1	2	3	4	5	6	7	8	9	10	11	Net points	Final rank
Jorge Maciel	Mistral One Design	~~31~~	9	~~23~~	14	7	3	18	22	14	—N/a		87.0	15
José van der Ploeg	Finn	1	8	15	~~DNS~~	~~17~~	8	15	6	11	5	—N/a	69.0	7
Jordi Calafat; Kiko Sánchez	470	1	17	14	~~20~~	2	19	5	~~PMS~~	3	13	2	76.0	9

Women

Athlete	Event	Race											Net points	Final rank
Athlete	Event	1	2	3	4	5	6	7	8	9	10	11	Net points	Final rank
Mireia Casas	Mistral One Design	14	13	11	11	~~23~~	11	~~15~~	7	12	—N/a		79.0	13
Helen Montilla	Europe	6	18	12	17	~~21~~	~~PMS~~	4	7	7	19	21	111.0	17
Theresa Zabell; Begona Via Dufresne	470	4	2	~~11~~	8	2	1	3	~~10~~	3	1	1	25.0	1st place, gold medalist(s)

Open

Athlete	Event	Race											Net points	Final rank
Athlete	Event	1	2	3	4	5	6	7	8	9	10	11	Net points	Final rank
Antón Garrote	Laser	17	15	18	~~36~~	26	31	18	18	17	12	~~DSQ~~	172.0	22
Fernando León Boissier; José Luis Ballester	Tornado	2	2	4	5	5	2	4	3	~~PMS~~	3	~~DNC~~	30.0	1st place, gold medalist(s)
José Doreste; Javier Hermida	Star	5	5	11	13	9	11	~~PMS~~	1	~~15~~	2	—N/a	57.0	7

Match racing

Athlete	Event	Qualification races										Total	Rank	Quarterfinals	Semifinals	Final / BM	Rank
Athlete	Event	1	2	3	4	5	6	7	8	9	10	Total	Rank	Quarterfinals	Semifinals	Final / BM	Rank
Luis Doreste; Domingo Manrique; David Vera	Soling	4	8	12	~~13~~	~~PMS~~	5	8	10	10	4	61.0	8	Did not advance			8

== Shooting ==
Men

Athlete	Event	Qualification		Final	
Athlete	Event	Points	Rank	Points	Rank
Jorge González	50 m rifle three positions	1155	37	Did not advance	
Jorge González	50 m rifle prone	597	6 Q	701.7	4
Jorge González	10 m air rifle	575	42	Did not advance	
José Pérez	Trap	120	13	Did not advance	

Women

Athlete	Event	Qualification		Final	
Athlete	Event	Points	Rank	Points	Rank
Cristina Antolin	50 m rifle three positions	557	38	Did not advance	
Cristina Antolin	10 m air rifle	386	36	Did not advance	
Maria Pilar Fernandez	10 m air pistol	378	19	Did not advance	
Maria Pilar Fernandez	25 m pistol	578	9	Did not advance	
María Quintanal	Double trap	100	11	Did not advance	
Gemma Usieto	Double trap	90	21	Did not advance	

== Swimming ==
Men's 50m freestyle

- Juan Benavides

- Heat — 23.36 (→ did not advance, 30th place)

Men's 100m freestyle

- Juan Benavides

- Heat — 51.20 (→ did not advance, 33rd place)

Men's 1500m freestyle

- Frederik Hviid

- Heat — 15:42.40 (→ did not advance, 21st place)

Men's 100m backstroke

- Martin López-Zubero

- Heat — 55.36
- Final — 55.22 (→ 4th place)

Men's 200m backstroke

- Martin López-Zubero

- Heat — 2:00.77
- Final — 2:00.74 (→ 6th place)

Men's 100m breaststroke

- Marc Capdevila

- Heat — 1:02.69
- B-final — 1:03.51 (→ 15th place)

Men's 200m breaststroke

- Joaquín Fernández

- Heat — 2:16.05
- B-final — 2:16.05 (→ 12th place)

Men's 200m butterfly

- José Luis Ballester

- Heat — 2:02.69 (→ did not advance, 29th place)

Men's 400m individual medley

- Frederik Hviid

- Heat — 4:23.67
- B-final — 4:22.47 (→ 9th place)

Women's 50m freestyle

- Claudia Franco

- Heat — 26.17
- B-final — 26.04 (→ 11th place)

- Blanca Cerón

- Heat — 26.30 (→ 22nd place)

Women's 100m freestyle

- Claudia Franco

- Heat — 57.00 (→ did not advance, 21st place)

Women's 400m freestyle

- Itziar Esparza

- Heat — 4:19.45 (→ did not advance, 19th place)

Women's 800m freestyle

- Itziar Esparza

- Heat — 8:50.22 (→ did not advance, 18th place)

Women's 100m backstroke

- Eva Piñera

- Heat — 1:04.41 (→ did not advance, 20th place)

Women's 200m backstroke

- Ivette María

- Heat — 2:18.72 (→ did not advance, 23rd place)

Women's 100m breaststroke

- María Olay

- Heat — 1:12.58 (→ did not advance, 28th place)

Women's 200m breaststroke

- Lourdes Becerra

- Heat — 2:33.80 (→ did not advance, 22nd place)

Women's 100m butterfly

- María Peláez

- Heat — 1:01.99 (→ did not advance, 19th place)

Women's 200m butterfly

- María Peláez

- Heat — 2:13.85
- B-final — 2:13.05 (→ 11th place)

- Bárbara Franco

- Heat — 2:13.34
- B-final — 2:14.16 (→ 16th place)

Women's 200m individual medley

- Silvia Parera

- Heat — 2:17.67
- B-final — 2:19.92 (→ 16th place)

Women's 400m individual medley

- Lourdes Becerra

- Heat — 4:45.54
- B-final — 4:45.17 (→ 7th place)

Women's 4 × 100 m freestyle relay

- Blanca Cerón, Fátima Madrid, Susanna Garabatos and Claudia Franco

- Heat — 3:49.47 (→ did not advance, 14th place)

Women's 4 × 100 m medley relay

- Eva Piñera, María Olay, María Peláez and Claudia Franco

- Heat — 4:15.63 (→ did not advance, 15th place)

== Tennis ==
Men's singles competition

- Albert Costa

- First round — Defeated Sébastien Lareau (Canada) 7-6 6-4
- Second round — Lost to Fernando Meligeni (Brazil) 6-7 4-6

- Carlos Costa

- First round — Lost to Andrea Gaudenzi (Italy) 3-6 2-6

- Sergi Bruguera

- First round — Defeated Andrei Pavel (Romania) 2-6 6-1 8-6
- Second round — Defeated Arnaud Boetsch (France) 7-6 4-6 6-2
- Third round — Defeated Greg Rusedski (Great Britain) 7-6 7-5
- Quarterfinals — Defeated MaliVai Washington (USA) 7-6 4-6 7-5
- Semifinals — Defeated Fernando Meligeni (Brazil) 7-6 6-2
- Final — Lost to Andre Agassi (USA) 2-6 3-6 1-6 (→ Silver medal)

Women's singles competition

- Arantxa Sánchez Vicario

- First round — Defeated Dominique Van Roost (Belgium) 6-1 7-5
- Second round — Defeated Silvia Farina (Italy) 6-1 6-3
- Third round — Defeated Brenda Schultz-McCarthy (Netherlands) 6-4 7-6
- Quarterfinals — Defeated Kimiko Date (Japan) 4-6 6-3 10-8
- Semifinals — Defeated Jana Novotná (Czech Republic) 6-4 1-6 6-3
- Final — Lost to Lindsay Davenport (USA) 6-7 2-6 (→ Silver medal)

- Conchita Martínez

- First round — Defeated Patty Schnyder (Switzerland) 6-1 6-2
- Second round — Defeated Radka Zrubáková (Slovakia) 6-1 6-4
- Third round — Defeated Natasha Zvereva (Belarus) 6-2 7-5
- Quarterfinals — Lost to Mary Joe Fernández (USA) 6-3 2-6 3-6

- Virginia Ruano Pascual

- First round — Defeated Magdalena Grzybowska (Poland) 6-4 6-2
- Second round — Lost to Iva Majoli (Croatia) 5-7 3-6

== Water polo ==
=== Men's tournament ===
- Preliminary round (Group A)

- Spain — Germany 9-3
- Spain — Netherlands 8-7
- Spain — Yugoslavia 7-9
- Spain — Hungary 7-8
- Spain — Russia 8-6

- Quarterfinals

- Spain — United States 5-4

- Semifinals

- Spain — Hungary 7-6

- Final

- Spain — Croatia 7-5 (→ Gold medal)

- Team roster

- Ángel Andreo
- Carles Sans
- Daniel Ballart
- Iván Moro
- Jesús Rollán
- Jordi Sans
- Jorge Payá
- Josep María Abarca
- Manuel Estiarte
- Miguel Ángel Oca
- Pedro Francisco García
- Salvador Gómez
- Sergi Pedrerol

== Notes ==
- Watkins, Ginger T., ed. (1997). The Official Report of the Centennial Olympic Games, Volume III The Competition Results (PDF). Atlanta: Peachtree Publishers. ISBN 1-56145-150-9.
- "Olympic Medal Winners". International Olympic Committee.
- "Comité Olímpico Español - Atlanta 1996" (in Spanish). Comité Olímpico Español. 2003.
