= Spain at the Olympics =

- IOC code: ESP
- NOC: Spanish Olympic Committee
- Website: www.coe.es (in Spanish)
- Medals Ranked 27th: Gold 55 Silver 77 Bronze 63 Total 195

Summer appearances
- 1900; 1904–1912; 1920; 1924; 1928; 1932; 1936; 1948; 1952; 1956; 1960; 1964; 1968; 1972; 1976; 1980; 1984; 1988; 1992; 1996; 2000; 2004; 2008; 2012; 2016; 2020; 2024

Winter appearances
- 1936; 1948; 1952; 1956; 1960; 1964; 1968; 1972; 1976; 1980; 1984; 1988; 1992; 1994; 1998; 2002; 2006; 2010; 2014; 2018; 2022; 2026

Spain first participated at the Olympic Games in 1900, and has sent athletes to compete in most Summer Olympic Games since 1920. The nation has also participated in every Winter Olympic Games since 1936. Its team is organised by the Spanish Olympic Committee (COE, Comité Olímpico Español) created in 1924.

Spain withdrew from the 1936 Summer Olympics in Nazi Germany because of the Civil War, and also boycotted the 1956 Games in Melbourne because of the Soviet Union's invasion of Hungary. The equestrian events in 1956 were held five months earlier in Stockholm, and Spain did participate in those events.

Spain hosted the 1992 Summer Olympics in Barcelona.

Spanish athletes have won a total of 195 medals in 34 different sports as of 2026 and the country currently ranks 25th in the all-time Summer Olympics medal count, with canoeing as the top medal-producing sport and sailing as the top gold medal-producing sport. Eight of those medals were won at the Winter Games.

The COE counts one medal more than the IOC because they recognized one won by Pedro José Pidal y Bernaldo de Quirós in live pigeon shooting in the 1900 Summer Olympics, while the IOC doesn't recognize the event as an official one as the winners were given a money award.

== Hosted Games ==
Spain has hosted the Games once.

Games	Host city	Dates	Nations	Participants	Events
1992 Summer Olympics	Barcelona	25 July – 9 August	169	9,356	257

=== Unsuccessful bids ===
Games	City	Winner of bid
1924 Summer Olympics	Barcelona	Paris, France
1936 Summer Olympics	Barcelona	Berlin, Nazi Germany
1972 Summer Olympics	Madrid	Munich, West Germany
1998 Winter Olympics	Jaca	Nagano, Japan
2002 Winter Olympics	Jaca	Salt Lake City, United States
2004 Summer Olympics	Seville	Athens, Greece
2008 Summer Olympics	Seville	Beijing, China
2010 Winter Olympics	Jaca	Vancouver, Canada
2012 Summer Olympics	Madrid	London, United Kingdom
2014 Winter Olympics	Jaca	Sochi, Russia
2016 Summer Olympics	Madrid	Rio de Janeiro, Brazil
2020 Summer Olympics	Madrid	Tokyo, Japan

== Medal tables ==
=== Medals by Summer Games ===
Host country

Games	Athletes	Gold	Silver	Bronze	Total	Rank
(French Third Republic) 1900 Paris	8	1	0	0	1	14
(United States) 1904 St. Louis	did not participate					
(United Kingdom) 1908 London	did not participate					
(Sweden) 1912 Stockholm	did not participate					
(Belgium) 1920 Antwerp	32	0	2	0	2	17
(French Third Republic) 1924 Paris	125	0	0	0	0	–
(Netherlands) 1928 Amsterdam	80	1	0	0	1	24
(United States) 1932 Los Angeles	6	0	0	1	1	26
(Nazi Germany) 1936 Berlin	did not participate					
(United Kingdom) 1948 London	65	0	1	0	1	28
(Finland) 1952 Helsinki	27	0	1	0	1	34
(Australia) 1956 Melbourne	6	0	0	0	0	–
(Italy) 1960 Rome	144	0	0	1	1	41
(Japan) 1964 Tokyo	53	0	0	0	0	–
1968 Mexico City	127	0	0	0	0	–
(West Germany) 1972 Munich	120	0	0	1	1	43
(Canada) 1976 Montreal	106	0	2	0	2	30
(Soviet Union) 1980 Moscow	155	1	3	2	6	20
(United States) 1984 Los Angeles	179	1	2	2	5	20
(South Korea) 1988 Seoul	229	1	1	2	4	25
(Spain) 1992 Barcelona	422	13	7	2	22	6
(United States) 1996 Atlanta	289	5	6	6	17	13
(Australia) 2000 Sydney	321	3	3	5	11	25
(Greece) 2004 Athens	317	3	11	6	20	20
(China) 2008 Beijing	286	5	11	3	19	14
(United Kingdom) 2012 London	278	4	10	6	20	17
(Brazil) 2016 Rio de Janeiro	305	7	4	6	17	14
(Japan) 2020 Tokyo	321	3	8	6	17	22
(France) 2024 Paris	383	5	4	9	18	15
(United States) 2028 Los Angeles	future event					
(Australia) 2032 Brisbane	future event					
Total (25/30)	4,384	53	76	58	187	26

=== Medals by Winter Games ===
Games	Athletes	Gold	Silver	Bronze	Total	Rank
(Nazi Germany) 1936 Garmisch-Partenkirchen	6	0	0	0	0	–
(Switzerland) 1948 St. Moritz	6	0	0	0	0	–
(Norway) 1952 Oslo	4	0	0	0	0	–
(Italy) 1956 Cortina d'Ampezzo	9	0	0	0	0	–
(United States) 1960 Squaw Valley	4	0	0	0	0	–
(Austria) 1964 Innsbruck	6	0	0	0	0	–
(France) 1968 Grenoble	19	0	0	0	0	–
(Japan) 1972 Sapporo	3	1	0	0	1	13
(Austria) 1976 Innsbruck	4	0	0	0	0	–
(United States) 1980 Lake Placid	8	0	0	0	0	–
(Socialist Federal Republic of Yugoslavia) 1984 Sarajevo	12	0	0	0	0	–
(Canada) 1988 Calgary	12	0	0	0	0	–
(France) 1992 Albertville	17	0	0	1	1	19
(Norway) 1994 Lillehammer	13	0	0	0	0	–
(Japan) 1998 Nagano	12	0	0	0	0	–
(United States) 2002 Salt Lake City	7	0	0	0	0	–
(Italy) 2006 Turin	16	0	0	0	0	–
(Canada) 2010 Vancouver	18	0	0	0	0	–
(Russia) 2014 Sochi	20	0	0	0	0	–
(South Korea) 2018 Pyeongchang	13	0	0	2	2	26
(China) 2022 Beijing	14	0	1	0	1	25
(Italy) 2026 Milano Cortina	20	1	0	2	3	18
(France) 2030 French Alps	future event					
(United States) 2034 Utah	future event					
Total (22/25)	243	2	1	5	8	39

=== Medals by summer sport ===
Leading in that sport

Sport	Gold	Silver	Bronze	Total
Sailing	14	5	3	22
Canoeing	5	10	8	23
Athletics	5	6	9	20
Cycling	5	5	6	16
Gymnastics	3	4	1	8
Judo	3	1	3	7
Tennis	2	8	5	15
Football	2	3	0	5
Water polo	2	3	0	5
Swimming	2	2	4	8
Taekwondo	1	5	1	7
Field hockey	1	3	1	5
Equestrian	1	2	1	4
Shooting	1	2	1	4
Weightlifting	1	1	1	3
Karate	1	1	0	2
Archery	1	0	0	1
Badminton	1	0	0	1
Basque pelota	1	0	0	1
Sport climbing	1	0	0	1
Basketball	0	5	1	6
Boxing	0	3	3	6
Artistic swimming	0	3	2	5
Beach volleyball	0	1	0	1
Polo	0	1	0	1
Rowing	0	1	0	1
Triathlon	0	1	0	1
Handball	0	0	6	6
Fencing	0	0	1	1
Wrestling	0	0	1	1
Totals (30 entries)	53	76	58	187

=== Medals by winter sport ===
Sport	Gold	Silver	Bronze	Total
Ski mountaineering	1	0	2	3
Alpine skiing	1	0	1	2
Snowboarding	0	1	1	2
Figure skating	0	0	1	1
Totals (4 entries)	2	1	5	8

== List of medalists ==
=== Summer Olympics ===
Medal	Name(s)	Games	Sport	Event
Gold	José de Amézola y Aspizúa; Francisco Villota	1900 Paris	Basque pelota	Two-man teams
Silver	Men's football team: Domingo Acedo Patricio Arabolaza Mariano Arrate Juan Artola José Belausteguigoitia Sabino Bilbao Ramón Eguiazábal Ramón Gil Silverio Izaguirre Rafael Moreno Luis Otero Francisco Pagazaurtundúa Josep Samitier Agustín Sancho Félix Sesúmaga Pedro Vallana Joaquín Vázquez Ricardo Zamora	1920 Antwerp	Football	Men's tournament
Silver	Álvaro de Figueroa; José de Figueroa; Hernando Fitz-James; Jacobo Fitz-James; Leopoldo Saínz de la Maza	1920 Antwerp	Polo	Men's tournament
Gold	José Álvarez de Bohórquez; Julio García Fernández de los Ríos; José Navarro Morenés	1928 Amsterdam	Equestrian	Team jumping
Bronze	Santiago Amat	1932 Los Angeles	Sailing	Snowbird
Silver	Jaime García; José Navarro Morenés; Marcelino Gavilán	1948 London	Equestrian	Team jumping
Silver	Ángel León Gozalo	1952 Helsinki	Shooting	Men's 50 metre pistol
Bronze	Men's field hockey team: Pedro Amat Francisco Caballer Juan Calzado José Colomer Carlos del Coso José Dinarés Eduardo Dualde Joaquín Dualde Rafael Egusquiza Ignacio Macaya Pedro Murúa Pedro Roig Luis Usoz Narciso Ventalló	1960 Rome	Field hockey	Men's tournament
Bronze	Enrique Rodríguez	1972 Munich	Boxing	Light flyweight
Silver	Antonio Gorostegui; Pedro Millet	1976 Montreal	Sailing	470
Silver	José María Esteban; José Ramón López; Herminio Menéndez; Luis Gregorio Ramos	1976 Montreal	Canoeing	Men's K-4 1000 m
Gold	Alejandro Abascal; Miguel Noguer	1980 Moscow	Sailing	Flying Dutchman
Silver	Jordi Llopart	1980 Moscow	Athletics	Men's 50 kilometres walk
Silver	Men's field hockey team: Juan Amat Jaime Arbós Juan Arbós Javier Cabot Ricardo Cabot Miguel Chaves Juan Coghen Miguel de Paz Francesc Fábregas José Miguel García Rafael Garralda Santiago Malgosa Paulino Monsalve Juan Pellón Carles Roca Jaime Zumalacárregui	1980 Moscow	Field hockey	Men's tournament
Silver	Guillermo del Riego; Herminio Menéndez	1980 Moscow	Canoeing	Men's K-2 500 metres
Bronze	David López-Zubero	1980 Moscow	Swimming	Men's 100 metre butterfly
Bronze	Herminio Menéndez; Luis Gregorio Ramos	1980 Moscow	Canoeing	Men's K-2 1000 metres
Gold	Luis Doreste; Roberto Molina	1984 Los Angeles	Sailing	470
Silver	Fernando Climent; Luis María Lasúrtegui	1984 Los Angeles	Rowing	Men's coxless pair
Silver	Men's basketball team: Fernando Arcega José Manuel Beirán Juan Corbalán Juan de la Cruz Andrés Jiménez Juan Manuel López Iturriaga José Llorente José Margall Fernando Martín Fernando Romay Juan Antonio San Epifanio Ignacio Solozábal	1984 Los Angeles	Basketball	Men's tournament
Bronze	Enrique Míguez; Narciso Suárez	1984 Los Angeles	Canoeing	Men's C-2 500 m
Bronze	José Manuel Abascal	1984 Los Angeles	Athletics	Men's 1500 m
Gold	José Luis Doreste	1988 Seoul	Sailing	Finn
Silver	Sergio Casal; Emilio Sánchez	1988 Seoul	Tennis	Men's doubles
Bronze	Sergio López	1988 Seoul	Swimming	Men's 200 m breaststroke
Bronze	Jorge Guardiola	1988 Seoul	Shooting	Skeet
Gold	José Manuel Moreno	1992 Barcelona	Cycling	Men's track time trial
Gold	Martín López-Zubero	1992 Barcelona	Swimming	Men's 200 m backstroke
Gold	Daniel Plaza	1992 Barcelona	Athletics	Men's 20 km walk
Gold	Miriam Blasco	1992 Barcelona	Judo	Women's Lightweight (56 kg)
Gold	Almudena Muñoz	1992 Barcelona	Judo	Women's Half Lightweight (52 kg)
Gold	Luis Doreste; Domingo Manrique	1992 Barcelona	Sailing	Flying Dutchman
Gold	José María van der Ploeg	1992 Barcelona	Sailing	Finn
Gold	Jordi Calafat; Kiko Sánchez	1992 Barcelona	Sailing	Men's 470
Gold	Theresa Zabell; Patricia Guerra	1992 Barcelona	Sailing	Women's 470
Gold	Juan Holgado; Alfonso Menéndez; Antonio Vázquez	1992 Barcelona	Archery	Men's Team
Gold	Women's field hockey team: María Carmen Barea Sonia Barrio Mercedes Coghen Celia Correa Natalia Dorado Nagore Gabellanes Mariví González Anna Maiques Silvia Manrique Elisabeth Maragall María Isabel Martínez Teresa Motos Nuria Olivé Virginia Ramírez María Ángeles Rodríguez Maider Tellería	1992 Barcelona	Field hockey	Women's tournament
Gold	Fermín Cacho	1992 Barcelona	Athletics	Men's 1500 m
Gold	Men's under-23 football team: José Emilio Amavisca Rafael Berges David Billabona Santiago Cañizares Abelardo Fernández Albert Ferrer Pep Guardiola Miguel Hernández Toni Jiménez Mikel Lasa Juan Manuel López Javier Manjarín Luis Enrique Martínez Francisco Narváez Alfonso Pérez Antonio Pinilla Francisco Soler Roberto Solozábal Francisco Veza Gabriel Vidal	1992 Barcelona	Football	Men's tournament
Silver	Natalia Vía Dufresne	1992 Barcelona	Sailing	Europe
Silver	Antonio Peñalver	1992 Barcelona	Athletics	Men's decathlon
Silver	Carolina Pascual	1992 Barcelona	Gymnastics	Women's rhythmic individual all-around
Silver	Jordi Arrese	1992 Barcelona	Tennis	Men's singles
Silver	Conchita Martínez; Arantxa Sánchez Vicario	1992 Barcelona	Tennis	Women's doubles
Silver	Faustino Reyes	1992 Barcelona	Boxing	Featherweight (57 kg)
Silver	Men's water polo team: Daniel Ballart Manuel Estiarte Pedro Francisco García Salvador Gómez Marco Antonio González Rubén Michavila Miguel Ángel Oca Sergi Pedrerol Josep Picó Jesús Rollán Ricardo Sánchez Jordi Sans Manuel Silvestre	1992 Barcelona	Water polo	Men's tournament
Bronze	Javier García Chico	1992 Barcelona	Athletics	Men's pole vault
Bronze	Arantxa Sánchez Vicario	1992 Barcelona	Tennis	Women's singles
Gold	Fernando León; José Luis Ballester	1996 Atlanta	Sailing	Tornado
Gold	Theresa Zabell; Begoña Vía Dufresne	1996 Atlanta	Sailing	Women's 470
Gold	Men's water polo team: Josep María Abarca Ángel Andreo Daniel Ballart Manuel Estiarte Pedro Francisco García Salvador Gómez Iván Moro Miguel Ángel Oca Jorge Payá Sergi Pedrerol Jesús Rollán Carles Sans Jordi Sans	1996 Atlanta	Water polo	Men's tournament
Gold	Marta Baldó; Nuria Cabanillas; Estela Giménez; Lorena Guréndez; Tania Lamarca; Estíbaliz Martínez	1996 Atlanta	Gymnastics	Women's rhythmic team
Gold	Miguel Induráin	1996 Atlanta	Cycling	Men's road time trial
Silver	Ernesto Pérez	1996 Atlanta	Judo	Men's Heavyweight (+95 kg)
Silver	Arantxa Sánchez Vicario	1996 Atlanta	Tennis	Women's singles
Silver	Men's field hockey team: Jaime Amat Pablo Amat Javier Arnau Jordi Arnau Óscar Barrena Ignacio Cobos Juan Dinarés Juan Escarré Xavier Escudé Juantxo García-Mauriño Antonio González Ramón Jufresa Joaquín Malgosa Víctor Pujol Ramón Sala Pablo Usoz	1996 Atlanta	Field hockey	Men's tournament
Silver	Abraham Olano	1996 Atlanta	Cycling	Men's road time trial
Silver	Sergi Bruguera	1996 Atlanta	Tennis	Men's singles
Silver	Fermín Cacho	1996 Atlanta	Athletics	Men's 1500 m
Bronze	Isabel Fernández	1996 Atlanta	Judo	Women's Lightweight (56 kg)
Bronze	Yolanda Soler	1996 Atlanta	Judo	Women's Extra Lightweight (48 kg)
Bronze	Conchita Martínez; Arantxa Sánchez Vicario	1996 Atlanta	Tennis	Women's doubles
Bronze	Rafael Lozano	1996 Atlanta	Boxing	Men's Light Flyweight (48 kg)
Bronze	Valentí Massana	1996 Atlanta	Athletics	Men's 50 km walk
Bronze	Men's handball team: Talant Duyshebaev Salvador Esquer Aitor Etxaburu Jesús Fernández Jaume Fort Mateo Garralda Raúl González Rafael Guijosa Fernando Hernández José Javier Hombrados Demetrio Lozano Jordi Núñez Jesús Olalla Juan Pérez Iñaki Urdangarín Alberto Urdiales	1996 Atlanta	Handball	Men's tournament
Gold	Isabel Fernández	2000 Sydney	Judo	Women's Lightweight (57 kg)
Gold	Joan Llaneras	2000 Sydney	Cycling	Men's points race
Gold	Gervasio Deferr	2000 Sydney	Gymnastics	Men's vault
Silver	Gabriel Esparza	2000 Sydney	Taekwondo	Men's Flyweight (58 kg)
Silver	Rafael Lozano	2000 Sydney	Boxing	Light Flyweight (48 kg)
Silver	Men's under-23 football team: David Albelda Iván Amaya Miguel Ángel Angulo Daniel Aranzubia Joan Capdevila Jordi Ferrón Gabriel García de la Torre Xavier Hernández Jesús María Lacruz Albert Luque Carlos Marchena Felip Ortiz Carles Puyol José María Romero Ismael Ruiz Raúl Tamudo Antonio Velamazán Unai Vergara	2000 Sydney	Football	Men's tournament
Bronze	Nina Zhivanevskaya	2000 Sydney	Swimming	Women's 100 m backstroke
Bronze	Margarita Fullana	2000 Sydney	Cycling	Women's cross-country
Bronze	Àlex Corretja; Albert Costa	2000 Sydney	Tennis	Men's doubles
Bronze	María Vasco	2000 Sydney	Athletics	Women's 20 km walk
Bronze	Men's handball team: David Barrufet Talant Dujshebaev Mateo Garralda Rafael Guijosa Demetrio Lozano Enric Masip Jordi Núñez Xavier O'Callaghan Jesús Olalla Antonio Ortega Juan Pérez Antonio Ugalde Iñaki Urdangarín Alberto Urdiales Andriy Xepkin	2000 Sydney	Handball	Men's tournament
Gold	Gervasio Deferr	2004 Athens	Gymnastics	Men's vault
Gold	Iker Martínez; Xabier Fernández	2004 Athens	Sailing	49er class
Gold	David Cal	2004 Athens	Canoeing	Men's C-1 1000 m
Silver	María Quintanal	2004 Athens	Shooting	Women's trap
Silver	Paquillo Fernández	2004 Athens	Athletics	Men's 20 km walk
Silver	Beatriz Ferrer-Salat; Juan Antonio Jiménez; Ignacio Rambla; Rafael Soto	2004 Athens	Equestrian	Team dressage
Silver	Rafael Trujillo	2004 Athens	Sailing	Finn class
Silver	Sandra Azón; Natalia Vía Dufresne	2004 Athens	Sailing	Women's 470 class
Silver	Conchita Martínez; Virginia Ruano Pascual	2004 Athens	Tennis	Women's doubles
Silver	Joan Llaneras	2004 Athens	Cycling	Men's points race
Silver	José Antonio Escuredo	2004 Athens	Cycling	Men's keirin
Silver	Javier Bosma; Pablo Herrera	2004 Athens	Volleyball	Men's beach volleyball
Silver	David Cal	2004 Athens	Canoeing	Men's C-1 500 m
Silver	José Antonio Hermida	2004 Athens	Cycling	Men's cross-country
Bronze	Manuel Martínez Gutiérrez	2004 Athens	Athletics	Men's shot put
Bronze	Sergi Escobar	2004 Athens	Cycling	Men's individual pursuit
Bronze	Carlos Castaño; Sergi Escobar; Asier Maeztu; Carlos Torrent	2004 Athens	Cycling	Men's team pursuit
Bronze	Patricia Moreno	2004 Athens	Gymnastics	Women's floor
Bronze	Beatriz Ferrer-Salat	2004 Athens	Equestrian	Individual dressage
Bronze	Joan Lino Martínez	2004 Athens	Athletics	Men's long jump
Gold	Samuel Sánchez	2008 Beijing	Cycling	Men's road race
Gold	Joan Llaneras	2008 Beijing	Cycling	Men's points race
Gold	Rafael Nadal	2008 Beijing	Tennis	Men's singles
Gold	Fernando Echávarri; Antón Paz Blanco	2008 Beijing	Sailing	Tornado class
Gold	Saúl Craviotto; Carlos Pérez	2008 Beijing	Canoeing	Men's K-2 500 m
Silver	Iker Martínez; Xabier Fernández	2008 Beijing	Sailing	49er class
Silver	Lydia Valentín	2008 Beijing	Weightlifting	Women's 75 kg
Silver	Anabel Medina Garrigues; Virginia Ruano Pascual	2008 Beijing	Tennis	Women's doubles
Silver	Gervasio Deferr	2008 Beijing	Gymnastics	Men's floor exercises
Silver	Joan Llaneras; Antonio Tauler	2008 Beijing	Cycling	Men's Madison
Silver	Andrea Fuentes; Gemma Mengual	2008 Beijing	Synchronized swimming	Women's duet
Silver	David Cal	2008 Beijing	Canoeing	Men's C-1 1000 m
Silver	David Cal	2008 Beijing	Canoeing	Men's C-1 500 m
Silver	Alba María Cabello; Raquel Corral; Andrea Fuentes; Gemma Mengual; Thaïs Henríquez; Laura López; Gisela Morón; Irina Rodríguez; Paola Tirados	2008 Beijing	Synchronized swimming	Women's team
Silver	Men's field hockey team: David Alegre Ramón Alegre Pablo Amat Eduard Arbós Francisco Cortés Sergi Enrique Alexandre Fàbregas Francisco Fábregas Juan Fernández Santi Freixa Rodrigo Garza Roc Oliva Xavier Ribas Albert Sala Víctor Sojo Eduard Tubau	2008 Beijing	Field hockey	Men's tournament
Silver	Men's basketball team: José Calderón Rudy Fernández Jorge Garbajosa Marc Gasol Pau Gasol Carlos Jiménez Raúl López Álex Mumbrú Juan Carlos Navarro Felipe Reyes Berni Rodríguez Ricky Rubio	2008 Beijing	Basketball	Men's tournament
Bronze	José Luis Abajo	2008 Beijing	Fencing	Men's individual épée
Bronze	Leire Olaberría	2008 Beijing	Cycling	Women's points race
Bronze	Men's handball team: David Barrufet Jon Belaustegui David Davis Alberto Entrerríos Raúl Entrerríos Rubén Garabaya Juan García José Javier Hombrados Demetrio Lozano Cristian Malmagro Carlos Prieto Albert Rocas Iker Romero Víctor Tomás	2008 Beijing	Handball	Men's tournament
Gold	Marina Alabau	2012 London	Sailing	Women's sailboard
Gold	Lydia Valentín	2012 London	Weightlifting	Women's 75 kg
Gold	Joel González	2012 London	Taekwondo	Men's 58 kg
Gold	Támara Echegoyen; Ángela Pumariega; Sofía Toro	2012 London	Sailing	Elliott 6m
Silver	Mireia Belmonte García	2012 London	Swimming	Women's 200 metre butterfly
Silver	Mireia Belmonte García	2012 London	Swimming	Women's 800 metre freestyle
Silver	Javier Gómez Noya	2012 London	Triathlon	Men's
Silver	Ona Carbonell; Andrea Fuentes	2012 London	Synchronized swimming	Women's duet
Silver	David Cal	2012 London	Canoeing	Men's C-1 1000 m
Silver	Brigitte Yagüe	2012 London	Taekwondo	Women's 49 kg
Silver	Women's water polo team: Marta Bach Andrea Blas Ana Copado Anni Espar Laura Ester Maica García Godoy Laura López Ona Meseguer Lorena Miranda Matilde Ortiz Jennifer Pareja Pilar Peña Roser Tarragó	2012 London	Water polo	Women's tournament
Silver	Nicolás García	2012 London	Taekwondo	Men's 80 kg
Silver	Saúl Craviotto	2012 London	Canoeing	Men's K-1 200 m
Silver	Men's basketball team: José Calderón Víctor Claver Rudy Fernández Marc Gasol Pau Gasol Serge Ibaka Sergio Llull Juan Carlos Navarro Felipe Reyes Sergio Rodríguez Víctor Sada Fernando San Emeterio	2012 London	Basketball	Men's tournament
Bronze	Maialen Chourraut	2012 London	Canoeing	Women's slalom K-1
Bronze	Maider Unda	2012 London	Wrestling	Women's freestyle 72 kg
Bronze	Clara Basiana; Alba Cabello; Ona Carbonell; Margalida Crespí; Andrea Fuentes; Thaïs Henríquez; Paula Klamburg; Irene Montrucchio; Laia Pons	2012 London	Synchronized swimming	Women's team
Bronze	Women's handball team: Macarena Aguilar Nely Carla Alberto Jessica Alonso Vanessa Amorós Andrea Barnó Elisabet Chávez Mihaela Ciobanu Verónica Cuadrado Patricia Elorza Beatriz Fernández Begoña Fernández Marta Mangué Carmen Martín Silvia Navarro Elisabeth Pinedo	2012 London	Handball	Women's tournament
Bronze	Ruth Beitia	2012 London	Athletics	Women's high jump
Bronze	Alfonso Benavides	2012 London	Canoeing	Men's C-1 200 metres
Gold	Mireia Belmonte	2016 Rio de Janeiro	Swimming	Women's 200 m butterfly
Gold	Maialen Chourraut	2016 Rio de Janeiro	Canoeing	Women's slalom K-1
Gold	Marc López; Rafael Nadal	2016 Rio de Janeiro	Tennis	Men's doubles
Gold	Marcus Cooper Walz	2016 Rio de Janeiro	Canoeing	Men's K-1 1000 m
Gold	Saúl Craviotto; Cristian Toro	2016 Rio de Janeiro	Canoeing	Men's K-2 200 m
Gold	Carolina Marín	2016 Rio de Janeiro	Badminton	Women's singles
Gold	Ruth Beitia	2016 Rio de Janeiro	Athletics	Women's high jump
Silver	Orlando Ortega	2016 Rio de Janeiro	Athletics	Men's 110 m hurdles
Silver	Eva Calvo	2016 Rio de Janeiro	Taekwondo	Women's 57 kg
Silver	Women's basketball team: Anna Cruz Silvia Domínguez Laura Gil Astou Ndour Laura Nicholls Laia Palau Lucila Pascua Laura Quevedo Leonor Rodríguez Leticia Romero Alba Torrens Marta Xargay	2016 Rio de Janeiro	Basketball	Women's tournament
Silver	Sandra Aguilar; Artemi Gavezou; Elena López; Lourdes Mohedano; Alejandra Quereda	2016 Rio de Janeiro	Gymnastics	Women's rhythmic group all-around
Bronze	Mireia Belmonte	2016 Rio de Janeiro	Swimming	Women's 400 m individual medley
Bronze	Lydia Valentín	2016 Rio de Janeiro	Weightlifting	Women's 75 kg
Bronze	Joel González	2016 Rio de Janeiro	Taekwondo	Men's 68 kg
Bronze	Saúl Craviotto	2016 Rio de Janeiro	Canoeing	Men's K-1 200 metres
Bronze	Men's basketball team: Álex Abrines José Calderón Víctor Claver Rudy Fernández Pau Gasol Willy Hernangómez Sergio Llull Nikola Mirotić Juan Carlos Navarro Felipe Reyes Sergio Rodríguez Ricky Rubio	2016 Rio de Janeiro	Basketball	Men's tournament
Bronze	Carlos Coloma	2016 Rio de Janeiro	Cycling	Men's cross-country
Gold	Alberto Fernández; Fátima Gálvez	2020 Tokyo	Shooting	Mixed trap team
Gold	Sandra Sánchez	2020 Tokyo	Karate	Women's kata
Gold	Alberto Ginés López	2020 Tokyo	Sport climbing	Men's combined
Silver	Adriana Cerezo	2020 Tokyo	Taekwondo	Women's 49 kg
Silver	Maialen Chourraut	2020 Tokyo	Canoeing	Women's slalom K-1
Silver	Rayderley Zapata	2020 Tokyo	Gymnastics	Men's floor
Silver	Teresa Portela	2020 Tokyo	Canoeing	Women's K-1 200 metres
Silver	Damián Quintero	2020 Tokyo	Karate	Men's kata
Silver	Saúl Craviotto; Marcus Cooper Walz; Carlos Arévalo; Rodrigo Germade	2020 Tokyo	Canoeing	Men's K-4 500 metres
Silver	Women's water polo team: Marta Bach Anni Espar Clara Espar Laura Ester Judith Forca Maica García Godoy Irene González Paula Leitón Beatriz Ortiz Pilar Peña Elena Ruiz Elena Sánchez Roser Tarragó	2020 Tokyo	Water polo	Women's tournament
Silver	Men's under-23 football team: Marco Asensio Dani Ceballos Marc Cucurella Álvaro Fernández Eric García Bryan Gil Óscar Gil Pedri González Mikel Merino Óscar Mingueza Rafa Mir Juan Miranda Jon Moncayola Dani Olmo Mikel Oyarzabal Javi Puado Unai Simón Carlos Soler Pau Torres Jesús Vallejo Iván Villar Martín Zubimendi	2020 Tokyo	Football	Men's tournament
Bronze	David Valero	2020 Tokyo	Cycling	Men's cross-country
Bronze	Pablo Carreño Busta	2020 Tokyo	Tennis	Men's singles
Bronze	Ana Peleteiro	2020 Tokyo	Athletics	Women's triple jump
Bronze	Joan Cardona Méndez	2020 Tokyo	Sailing	Finn
Bronze	Jordi Xammar; Nicolás Rodríguez	2020 Tokyo	Sailing	Men's 470
Bronze	Men's handball team: Julen Aguinagalde Rodrigo Corrales Alex Dujshebaev Raúl Entrerríos Ángel Fernández Adrià Figueras Antonio García Robledo Aleix Gómez Gedeón Guardiola Eduardo Gurbindo Jorge Maqueda Viran Morros Gonzalo Pérez de Vargas Miguel Sánchez-Migallón Daniel Sarmiento Ferran Solé	2020 Tokyo	Handball	Men's tournament
Gold	Diego Botín; Florián Trittel	2024 Paris	Sailing	Men's 49er
Gold	María Pérez; Álvaro Martín	2024 Paris	Athletics	Mixed marathon walk relay
Gold	Men's under-23 football team: Álex Baena Pablo Barrios Adrián Bernabé Sergio Camello Pau Cubarsí Eric García Joan García Sergio Gómez Miguel Gutiérrez Alejandro Iturbe Diego López Fermín López Juan Miranda Cristhian Mosquera Samu Omorodion Aimar Oroz Jon Pacheco Marc Pubill Abel Ruiz Juanlu Sánchez Arnau Tenas Beñat Turrientes	2024 Paris	Football	Men's tournament
Gold	Jordan Díaz	2024 Paris	Athletics	Men's triple jump
Gold	Women's water polo team: Paula Camus; Paula Crespí; Anni Espar; Laura Ester; Judith Forca; Maica García; Paula Leitón; Beatriz Ortiz; Pili Peña; Nona Pérez; Isabel Piralkova; Elena Ruiz; Martina Terré	2024 Paris	Water polo	Women's tournament
Silver	María Pérez	2024 Paris	Athletics	Women's 20 km walk
Silver	Carlos Alcaraz	2024 Paris	Tennis	Men's singles
Silver	Women's 3x3 team: Gracia Alonso de Armiño Juana Camilión Vega Gimeno Sandra Ygueravide	2024 Paris	Basketball	Women's 3×3 tournament
Silver	Ayoub Ghadfa	2024 Paris	Boxing	Men's super heavyweight
Bronze	Francisco Garrigós	2024 Paris	Judo	Men's 60 kg
Bronze	Álvaro Martín	2024 Paris	Athletics	Men's 20 km walk
Bronze	Pau Echaniz	2024 Paris	Canoeing	Men's slalom K-1
Bronze	Cristina Bucșa; Sara Sorribes Tormo	2024 Paris	Tennis	Women's doubles
Bronze	Enmanuel Reyes	2024 Paris	Boxing	Men's heavyweight
Bronze	Meritxell Ferré; Marina García Polo; Lilou Lluís Valette; Meritxell Mas; Alisa Ozhogina; Paula Ramírez; Iris Tió; Blanca Toledano	2024 Paris	Artistic swimming	Women's team
Bronze	Joan Antoni Moreno; Diego Domínguez	2024 Paris	Canoeing	Men's C-2 500
Bronze	Saúl Craviotto; Carlos Arévalo; Marcus Cooper Walz; Rodrigo Germade	2024 Paris	Canoeing	Men's K-4 500
Bronze	Men's handball team: Agustín Casado Rodrigo Corrales Alex Dujshebaev Daniel Dujshebaev Daniel Fernández Adrià Figueras Imanol Garciandia Aleix Gómez Jorge Maqueda Kauldi Odriozola Gonzalo Pérez de Vargas Javier Rodríguez Miguel Sánchez-Migallón Abel Serdio Ian Tarrafeta	2024 Paris	Handball	Men's tournament

=== Winter Olympics ===
Medal	Name(s)	Games	Sport	Event
Gold	Francisco Fernández Ochoa	1972 Sapporo	Alpine skiing	Men's slalom
Bronze	Blanca Fernández Ochoa	1992 Albertville	Alpine skiing	Women's slalom
Bronze	Regino Hernández	2018 Pyeongchang	Snowboarding	Men's snowboard cross
Bronze	Javier Fernández	2018 Pyeongchang	Figure skating	Men's singles
Silver	Queralt Castellet	2022 Beijing	Snowboarding	Women's halfpipe
Gold	Oriol Cardona Coll	2026 Milano Cortina	Ski mountaineering	Men's sprint
Bronze	Ana Alonso	2026 Milano Cortina	Ski mountaineering	Women's sprint
Bronze	Oriol Cardona; Ana Alonso	2026 Milano Cortina	Ski mountaineering	Mixed relay

== Spanish athletes with most Olympic medals ==
Only Spanish athletes who achieved 3 or more medals or 2 gold medals are included in the following table.

No.	Athlete	Sport	Gender	Gold	Silver	Bronze	Total
1	Saúl Craviotto	Canoeing	M	2	2	2	6
2	Joan Llaneras	Cycling	M	2	2	0	4
3	Gervasio Deferr	Gymnastics	M	2	1	0	3
4	Luis Doreste	Sailing	M	2	0	0	2
4	Rafael Nadal	Tennis	M	2	0	0	2
6	Theresa Zabell	Sailing	F	2	0	0	2
7	David Cal	Canoeing	M	1	4	0	5
8	Mireia Belmonte	Swimming	F	1	2	1	4
9	Anni Espar	Water polo	F	1	2	0	3
9	Laura Ester	Water polo	F	1	2	0	3
9	Maica García Godoy	Water polo	F	1	2	0	3
9	Pili Peña	Water polo	F	1	2	0	3
13	Maialen Chourraut	Canoeing	F	1	1	1	3
13	Marcus Cooper	Canoeing	M	1	1	1	3
13	Lydia Valentín	Weightlifting	F	1	1	1	3
16	Andrea Fuentes	Synchronized swimming	F	0	3	1	4
17	Arantxa Sánchez Vicario	Tennis	F	0	2	2	4
18	José Manuel Calderón	Basketball	M	0	2	1	3
18	Rudy Fernández	Basketball	M	0	2	1	3
18	Pau Gasol	Basketball	M	0	2	1	3
18	Herminio Menéndez	Canoeing	M	0	2	1	3
18	Conchita Martínez	Tennis	F	0	2	1	3
18	Juan Carlos Navarro	Basketball	M	0	2	1	3
18	Felipe Reyes	Basketball	M	0	2	1	3
25	Demetrio Lozano	Handball	M	0	0	3	3

== Summary by sport ==
=== Archery ===
Games	Archers	Events	Gold	Silver	Bronze	Total	Ranking
1992 Barcelona	1	3/4	1	0	0	1	2
Total			1	0	0	1	14

=== Athletics ===
Games	Athletes	Events	Gold	Silver	Bronze	Total	Ranking
(Russia) 1980 Moscow	22	13/38	0	1	0	1	12
(United States) 1984 Los Angeles	18	12/41	0	0	1	1	22
(Spain) 1992 Barcelona	59	31/43	2	1	1	4	6
(United States) 1996 Atlanta	59	31/44	0	1	1	2	30
(Australia) 2000 Sydney	56	34/46	0	0	1	1	40
(Greece) 2004 Athens	57	33/46	0	1	2	3	25
(United Kingdom) 2012 London	46	26/47	0	0	1	1	36
(Brazil) 2016 Rio de Janeiro	47	28/47	1	1	0	2	12
(Japan) 2020 Tokyo	52	33/48	0	0	1	1	36
(France) 2024 Paris	55	25/48	2	1	1	4	5
Total			5	6	9	20	34

Event	No. of appearances	First appearance	First medal	First gold medal	Gold	Silver	Bronze	Total	Best finish
Men's 1500 metres	16/30	1920	1984	1992	1	1	1	3	Gold (1992)
Men's 110 hurdles	13/30	1948	2016	—N/a	0	1	0	1	Silver (2016)
Men's 20 km walk	12/18	1980	1992	1992	1	1	1	3	Gold (1992)
Men's 50 km walk	13/20	1948	1980	—N/a	0	1	1	2	Silver (1980)
Men's pole vault	10/30	1928	1992	—N/a	0	0	1	1	Bronze (1992)
Men's shot put	8/30	1920	2004	—N/a	0	0	1	1	Bronze (2004)
Men's long jump	17/30	1928	2004	—N/a	0	0	1	1	Bronze (2004)
Men's decathlon	9/26	1988	1992	—N/a	0	1	0	1	Silver (1992)
Women's 20 km walk	7/7	2000	2000	—N/a	0	1	1	2	Silver (2024)
Women's high jump	6/23	1984	2012	2016	1	0	1	2	Gold (2016)
Women's triple jump	8/8	1996	2020	—N/a	0	0	1	1	Bronze (2020)
Mixed marathon walk relay	1/1	2024	2024	2024	1	0	0	1	Gold (2024)

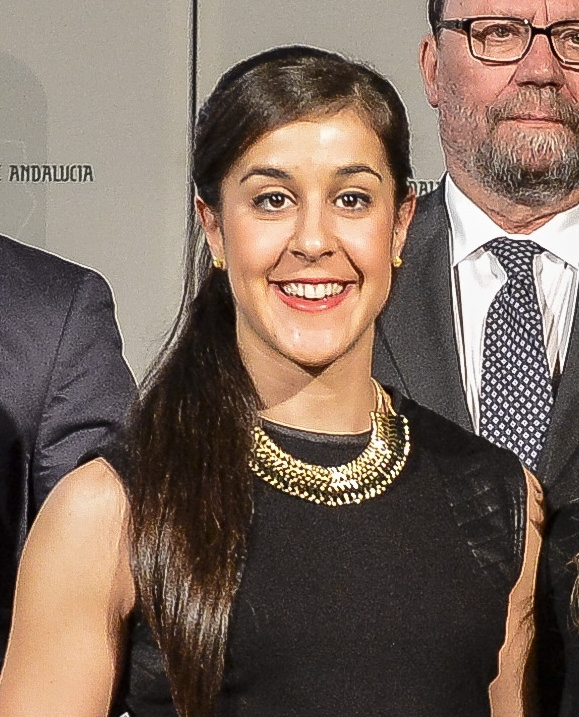
Carolina Marín is Spain's only gold in badminton and only non-Asian female player to win a badminton gold medal at the Olympics

=== Badminton ===
Games	Players	Events	Gold	Silver	Bronze	Total	Ranking
(Brazil) 2016 Rio de Janeiro	2	2/5	1	0	0	1	3
Total			1	0	0	1	7

=== Basketball ===
Games	Events	Gold	Silver	Bronze	Total	Ranking
(Italy) 1960 Rome	1/1	0	0	0	0	14
1968 Mexico City	1/1	0	0	0	0	7
(West Germany) 1972 Munich	1/1	0	0	0	0	11
(Soviet Union) 1980 Moscow	1/2	0	0	0	0	5
(United States) 1984 Los Angeles	1/2	0	1	0	1	2
(South Korea) 1988 Seoul	1/2	0	0	0	0	4
(Spain) 1992 Barcelona	2/2	0	0	0	0	6
(Australia) 2000 Sydney	1/2	0	0	0	0	6
(Greece) 2004 Athens	2/2	0	0	0	0	5
(China) 2008 Beijing	2/2	0	1	0	1	2
(United Kingdom) 2012 London	1/2	0	1	0	1	2
(Brazil) 2016 Rio de Janeiro	2/2	0	1	1	2	2
(France) 2024 Paris	3/4	0	1	0	1	5
Total		0	5	1	6	6

Event	No. of appearances	First appearance	First medal	First gold medal	Gold	Silver	Bronze	Total	Best finish
Men's 5-on-5 tournament	13/20	1960	1984	—N/a	0	3	1	4	(silver) (1984, 2008, 2012)
Women's 5-on-5 tournament	5/12	1992	2016	—N/a	0	1	0	1	(silver) (2016)
Men's 3x3 tournament	0/2	—N/a	—N/a	—N/a	0	0	0	0	—N/a
Women's 3x3 tournament	1/2	2024	2024	—N/a	0	1	0	1	(silver) (2024)

=== Basque pelota ===
Spain is credited with a gold medal in the only appearance of basque pelota as a medal sport at the Olympics in 1900, though the French team (one of only two teams to enter) withdrew shortly before the competition started and so no competition was held.

Games	Players	Events	Gold	Silver	Bronze	Total
1900 Paris	2	1/1	1	0	0	1
Total			1	0	0	1

=== Boxing ===
Games	Boxers	Events	Gold	Silver	Bronze	Total	Ranking
(West Germany) 1972 Munich	1	1/11	0	0	1	1	17
(Spain) 1992 Barcelona	7	7/12	0	1	0	1	11
(United States) 1996 Atlanta	1	1/12	0	0	1	1	17
(Australia) 2000 Sydney	1	1/12	0	1	0	1	11
(France) 2024 Paris	6	6/13	0	1	1	2	10
Total			0	3	3	6	48

Event	First medal	First gold medal	Gold	Silver	Bronze	Total	Best finish
Men's Super-heavyweight	2024	—N/a	0	1	0	1	(silver) (2024)
Men's Heavyweight	2024	—N/a	0	0	1	1	(bronze) (2024)
Men's Light-heavyweight	—N/a	—N/a	0	0	0	0	QF (2020)
Men's Middleweight	—N/a	—N/a	0	0	0	0	R16 (1928)
Men's Welterweight	—N/a	—N/a	0	0	0	0	QF (1948, 1960)
Men's Lightweight	—N/a	—N/a	0	0	0	0	QF (1964, 1984)
Men's Light-flyweight	1972	—N/a	0	1	2	3	(silver) (2000)
Men's Featherweight	1992	—N/a	0	1	0	1	(silver) (1992)
Men's Bantamweight	—N/a	—N/a	0	0	0	0	4th (1948)
Men's Flyweight	—N/a	—N/a	0	0	0	0	QF (1924, 1948, 2020)

=== Canoeing ===
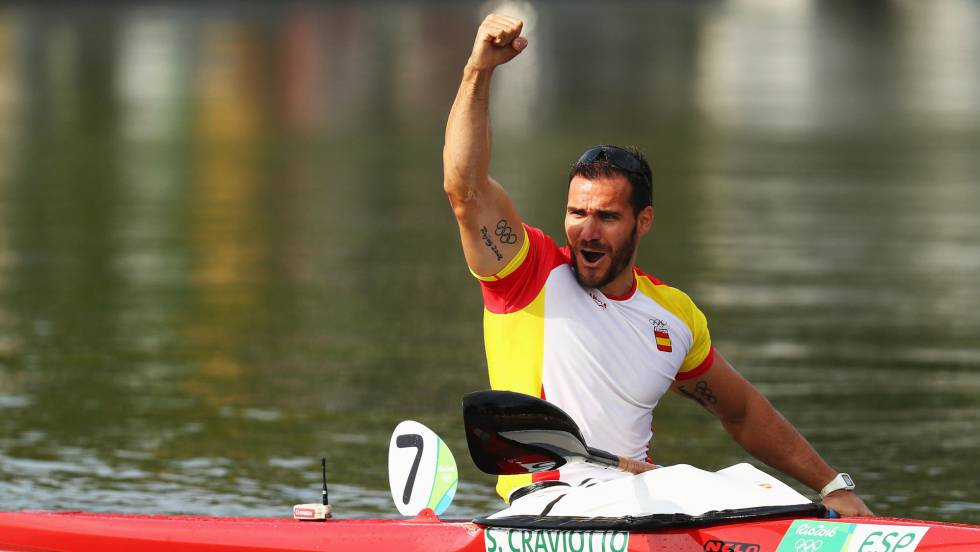
Saúl Craviotto won a total of 6 Olympic medals in sprint kayak events between 2008 and 2024, more than any other Spanish Olympic athlete.

Games	Athletes	Events	Gold	Silver	Bronze	Total	Ranking
(Canada) 1976 Montreal	7	5/11	0	1	0	1	6
(Russia) 1980 Moscow	4	6/11	0	1	1	2	6
(United States) 1984 Los Angeles	10	9/12	0	0	1	1	9
(Greece) 2004 Athens	16	11/16	1	1	0	2	5
(China) 2008 Beijing	10	9/16	1	2	0	3	5
(United Kingdom) 2012 London	8	8/16	0	2	2	4	11
(Brazil) 2016 Rio de Janeiro	11	8/16	3	0	1	4	2
(Japan) 2020 Tokyo	15	12/16	0	3	0	3	11
(France) 2024 Paris	22	16/16	0	0	3	3	15
Total			5	10	8	23	17

Event	First appearance	First medal	First gold medal	Gold	Silver	Bronze	Total	Best finish
Men's C-1 200 metres	2012	2012	—N/a	0	0	1	1	(bronze) (2012)
Men's C-1 500 metres	1984	2004	—N/a	0	2	0	2	(silver) (2004,2008)
Men's C-1 1000 metres	1984	2004	2004	1	2	0	3	(gold) (2004)
Men's C-2 500 metres	1980	1984	—N/a	0	0	2	2	(bronze) (1984, 2024)
Men's K-1 200 metres	2012	2012	—N/a	0	1	0	1	(silver) (2012)
Men's K-1 1000 metres	1960	2016	2016	1	0	0	1	(gold) (2016)
Men's K-2 200 metres	2016	2016	2016	1	0	0	1	(gold) (2016)
Men's K-2 500 metres	1976	1980	2008	1	1	0	2	(gold) (2008)
Men's K-2 1000 metres	1960	1980	—N/a	0	0	1	1	(bronze) (1980)
Men's K-4 500 metres	2020	2020	—N/a	0	1	1	2	(silver) (2020)
Men's K-4 1000 metres	1968	1976	—N/a	0	1	1	2	(silver) (1976)
Men's K-1 slalom	1996	2024	—N/a	0	0	1	1	(bronze) (2024)
Women's K-1 200 metres	2012	2020	—N/a	0	1	0	1	(silver) (2020)
Women's K-1 slalom	1992	2012	2016	1	1	1	3	(gold) (2016)

=== Cycling ===
Games	Gold	Silver	Bronze	Total	Ranking
(Spain) 1992 Barcelona	1	0	0	1	4
(United States) 1996 Atlanta	1	1	0	2	4
(Australia) 2000 Sydney	1	0	1	2	9
(Greece) 2004 Athens	0	3	2	5	11
(China) 2008 Beijing	2	1	1	4	3
(Brazil) 2016 Rio de Janeiro	0	0	1	1	18
(Japan) 2020 Tokyo	0	0	1	1	23
Total	5	5	6	16	14

=== Equestrian ===
Spain had one competitor in the first equestrian events in 1900, competing in the mail coach event.

Games	Riders	Events	Gold	Silver	Bronze	Total	Ranking
1900 Paris	1	1/5	0	0	0	0	
1928 Amsterdam	6	4/6	1	0	0	1	3
1948 London	7	4/6	0	1	0	1	6
2004 Athens	4	2/6	0	1	1	2	7
Total			1	2	1	4	18

=== Fencing ===
Spain's 1900 Olympic debut included 1 fencer, Mauricio Álvarez de las Asturias Bohorques, 4th Duke of Gor, who competed in each of the 3 weapons' individual amateur events and reached the semifinals (5th to 8th place) in the sabre.

Games	Fencers	Events	Gold	Silver	Bronze	Total	Ranking
1900 Paris	1	3/7	0	0	0	0	
2008 Beijing	5	5/10	0	0	1	1	12
Total			0	0	1	1	38

=== Field hockey ===
Games	Events	Gold	Silver	Bronze	Total	Ranking
(Netherlands) 1928 Amsterdam	1/1	0	0	0	0	7
(United Kingdom) 1948 London	1/1	0	0	0	0	11
(Italy) 1960 Rome	1/1	0	0	1	1	3
(Japan) 1964 Tokyo	1/1	0	0	0	0	4
1968 Mexico City	1/1	0	0	0	0	6
(West Germany) 1972 Munich	1/1	0	0	0	0	7
(Canada) 1976 Montreal	1/1	0	0	0	0	6
(Soviet Union) 1980 Moscow	1/2	0	1	0	1	3
(Spain) 1992 Barcelona	2/2	1	0	0	1	2
(United States) 1996 Atlanta	2/2	0	1	0	1	3
(China) 2008 Beijing	2/2	0	1	0	1	3
Total		1	3	1	5	8

Event	First appearance	First medal	First gold medal	Gold	Silver	Bronze	Total	Best finish
Men's tournament	1928	1960	—N/a	0	3	1	4	(silver) (1980, 1996, 2008)
Women's tournament	1992	1992	1992	1	0	0	1	(gold) (1992)

=== Football ===
Games	Events	Gold	Silver	Bronze	Total	Ranking
(Belgium) 1920 Antwerp	1/1	0	1	0	1	2
(France) 1924 Paris	1/1	0	0	0	0	17
(Netherlands) 1928 Amsterdam	1/1	0	0	0	0	8
1968 Mexico City	1/1	0	0	0	0	6
(Canada) 1976 Montreal	1/1	0	0	0	0	12
(Soviet Union) 1980 Moscow	1/1	0	0	0	0	10
(Spain) 1992 Barcelona	1/1	1	0	0	1	1
(Australia) 2000 Sydney	1/2	0	1	0	1	3
(Japan) 2020 Tokyo	1/2	0	1	0	1	3
(France) 2024 Paris	2/2	1	0	0	1	1
Total	13	2	3	0	5	5

Event	No. of appearances	First appearance	First medal	First gold medal	Gold	Silver	Bronze	Total	Best finish
Men's tournament	12/28	1920	1920	1992	2	3	0	5	(gold) (1992, 2024)
Women's tournament	1/8	2024	—N/a	—N/a	0	0	0	0	4th (2024)

=== Gymnastics ===
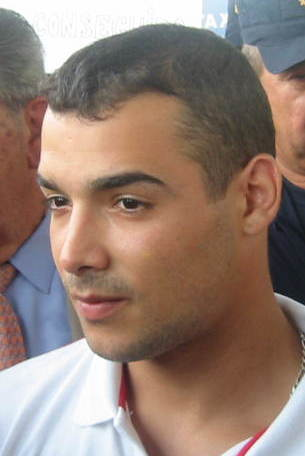
Gervasio Deferr is the most successful Spanish athlete in Gymnastics

Games	Gold	Silver	Bronze	Total	Ranking
(Spain) 1992 Barcelona	0	1	0	1	9
(United States) 1996 Atlanta	1	0	0	1	6
(Australia) 2000 Sydney	1	0	0	1	4
(Greece) 2004 Athens	1	0	1	2	9
(China) 2008 Beijing	0	1	0	1	12
(Brazil) 2016 Rio de Janeiro	0	1	0	1	14
(Japan) 2020 Tokyo	0	1	0	1	13
Total	3	4	1	8	24

=== Handball ===
Games	Athletes	Events	Gold	Silver	Bronze	Total	Ranking
(United States) 1996 Atlanta	14	1/2	0	0	1	1	5
(Australia) 2000 Sydney	14	1/2	0	0	1	1	5
(China) 2008 Beijing	14	1/2	0	0	1	1	5
(United Kingdom) 2012 London	28	2/2	0	0	1	1	5
(Japan) 2020 Tokyo	31	2/2	0	0	1	1	4
(France) 2024 Paris	41	2/2	0	0	1	1	5
Total			0	0	6	6	21

Event	No. of appearances	First appearance	First medal	First gold medal	Gold	Silver	Bronze	Total	Best finish
Men's tournament	11/14	1972	1996	—N/a	0	0	5	5	(bronze) (1996, 2000, 2008, 2020, 2024)
Women's tournament	5/12	1992	2012	—N/a	0	0	1	1	(bronze) (2012)

=== Judo ===
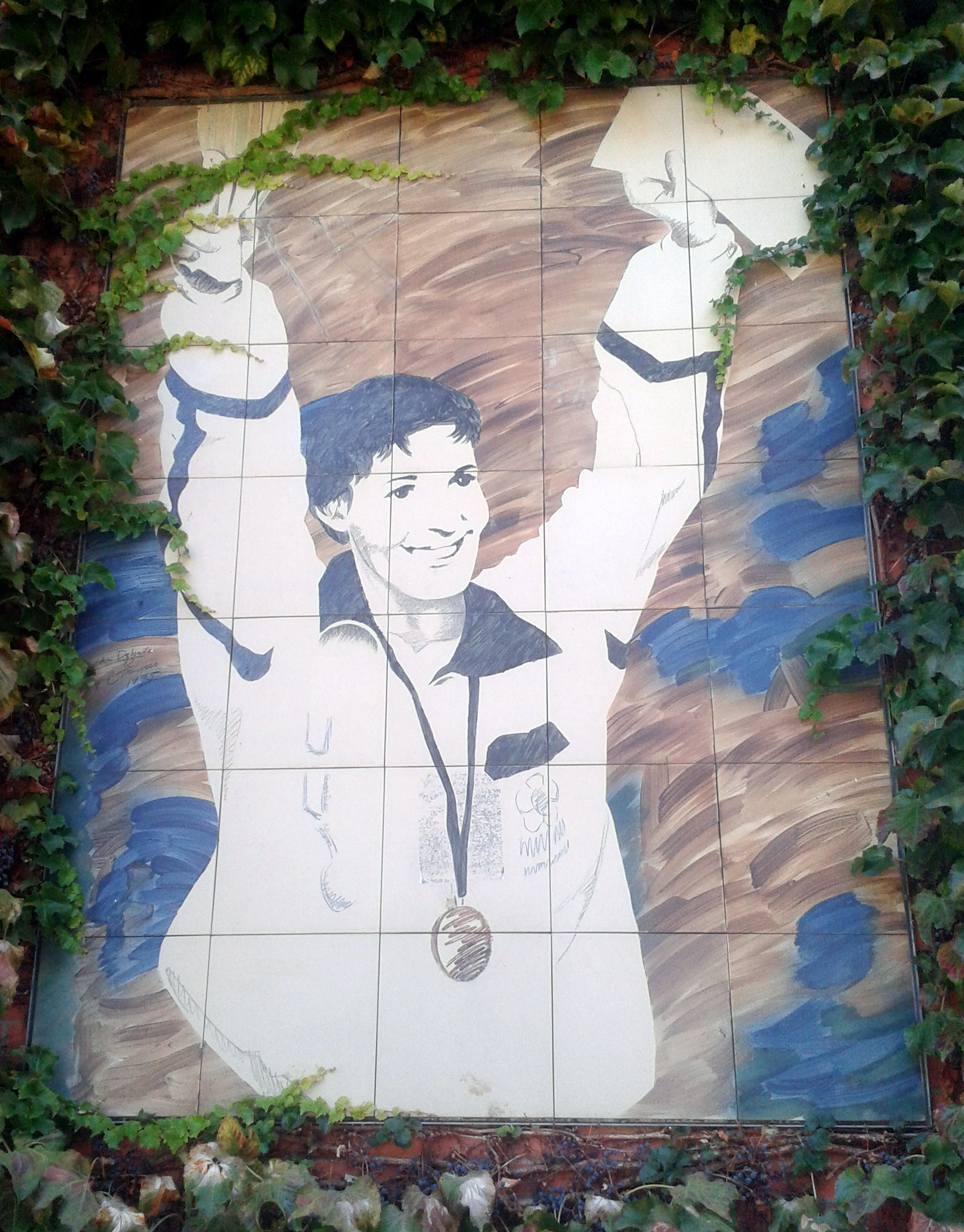
Miriam Blasco was Spain's first female medallist and first female gold medallist.

Games	Judokas	Events	Gold	Silver	Bronze	Total	Ranking
(Spain) 1992 Barcelona	12	12/14	2	0	0	2	4
(United States) 1996 Atlanta	9	9/14	0	1	2	3	10
(Australia) 2000 Sydney	12	12/14	1	0	0	1	6
(France) 2024 Paris	9	10/15	0	0	1	1	20
Total	87	88	3	1	3	7	15

Event	No. of appearances	First appearance	First medal	First gold medal	Gold	Silver	Bronze	Total	Best finish
Men's Heavyweight	5/15	1972	1996	—N/a	0	1	0	1	(silver) (1996)
Men's Half-heavyweight	2/14	1984	—N/a	—N/a	0	0	0	0	5th (2024)
Men's Middleweight	9/15	1976	—N/a	—N/a	0	0	0	0	5th (1976, 2024)
Men's Half-middleweight	5/14	1976	—N/a	—N/a	0	0	0	0	7th (1976, 1988)
Men's Lightweight	6/15	1984	—N/a	—N/a	0	0	0	0	7th (1988)
Men's Half-lightweight	8/12	1984	—N/a	—N/a	0	0	0	0	4th (2004, 2012)
Men's Extra-lightweight	8/12	1984	2024	—N/a	0	0	1	1	(bronze) (2024)
Women's Heavyweight	2/9	1992	—N/a	—N/a	0	0	0	0	13th (1992, 2000)
Women's Half-heavyweight	5/9	1992	—N/a	—N/a	0	0	0	0	5th (2008)
Women's Middleweight	8/9	1992	—N/a	—N/a	0	0	0	0	5th (2000, 2008, 2016, 2024)
Women's Half-middleweight	6/9	1992	—N/a	—N/a	0	0	0	0	7th (1992, 1996)
Women's Lightweight	6/9	1992	1992	1992	2	0	1	3	(gold) (1992, 1996)
Women's Half-lightweight	8/9	1992	1992	1992	1	0	0	1	(gold) (1992)
Women's Extra-lightweight	7/9	1992	1996	—N/a	0	0	1	1	(bronze) (1996)

=== Karate ===
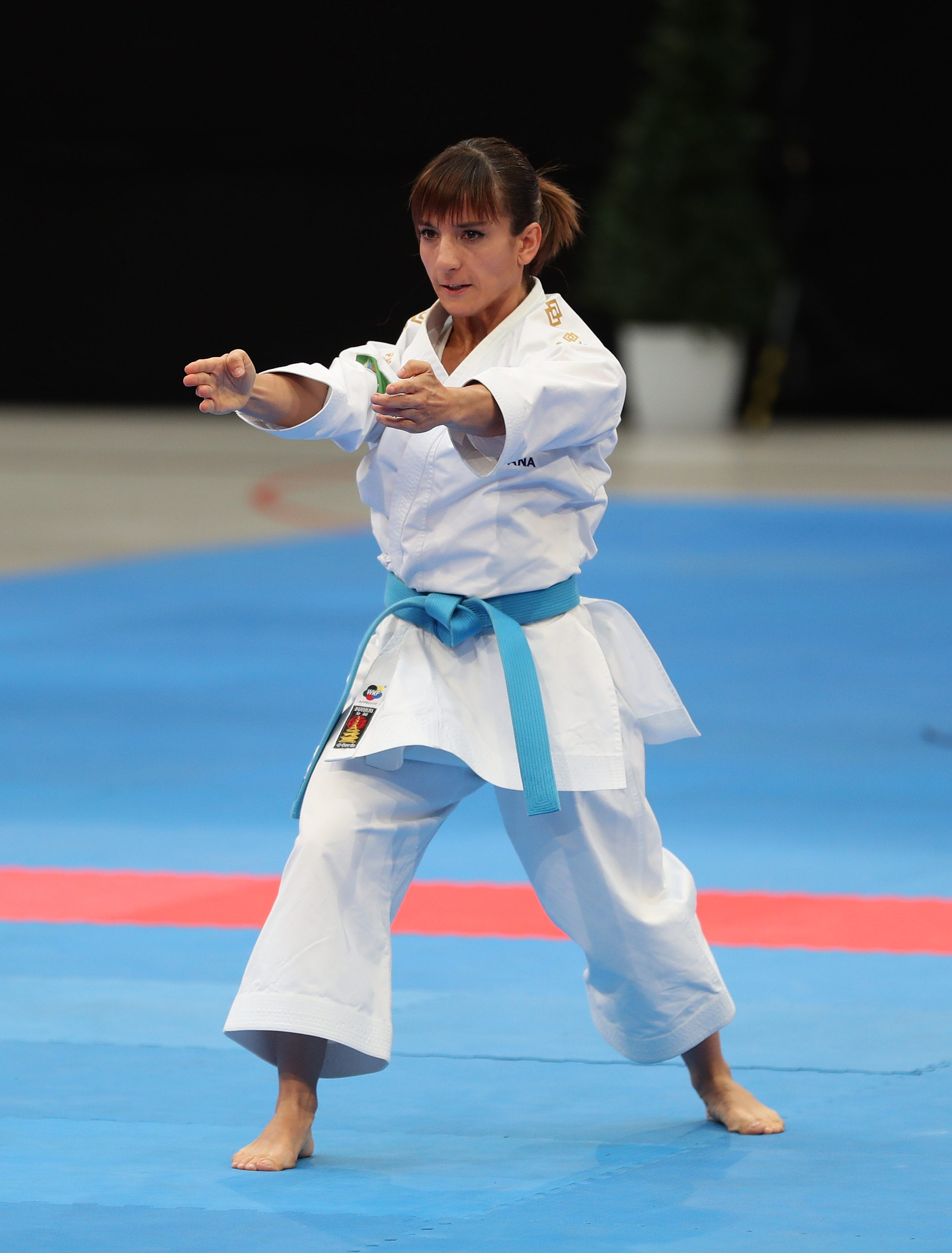
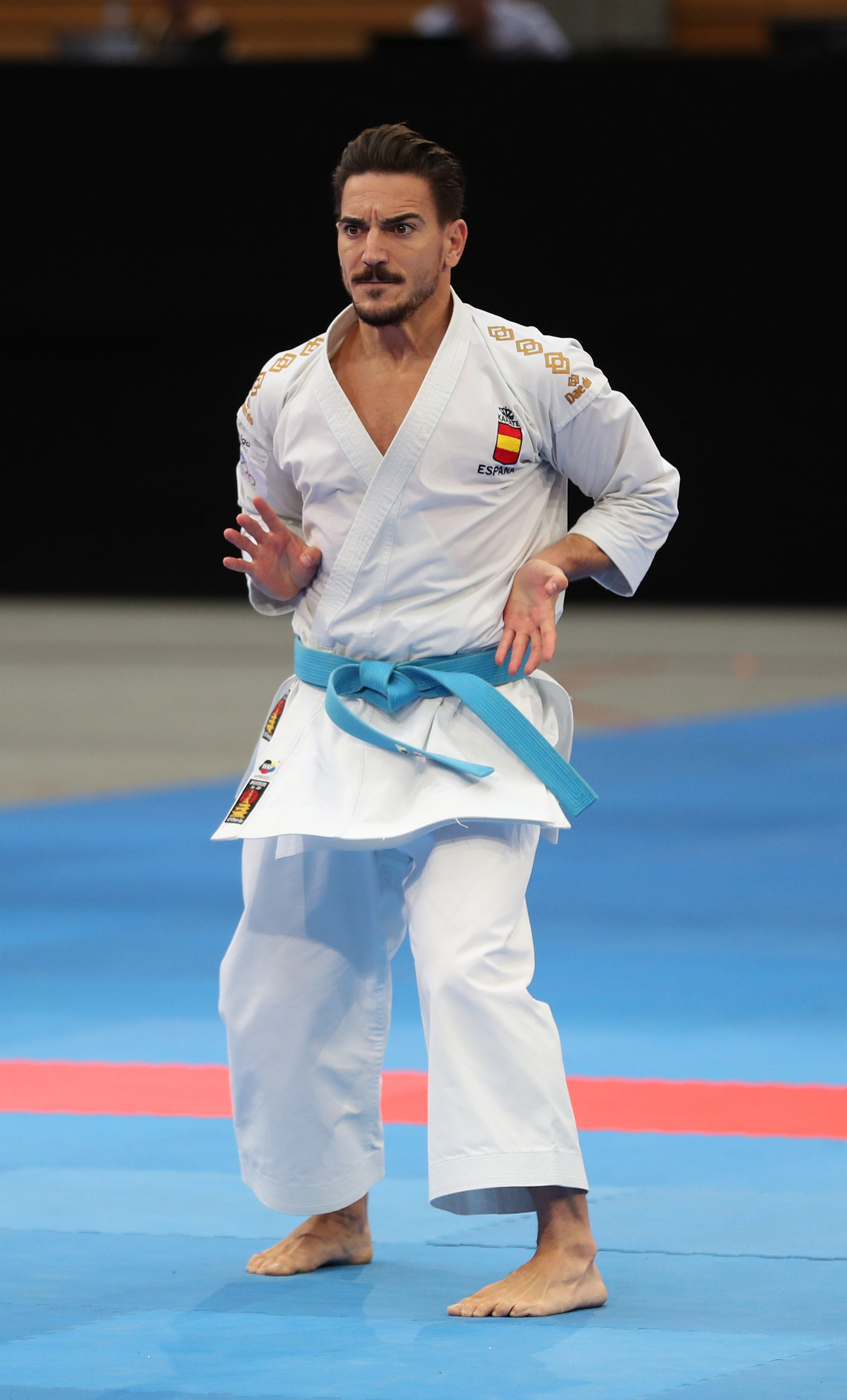
Sandra Sánchez (left) and Damián Quintero (right) gave Spain its two medals in karate.

Games	Karatekas	Events	Gold	Silver	Bronze	Total	Ranking
(Japan) 2020 Tokyo	2	2/8	1	1	0	2	2
Total			1	1	0	2	2

=== Rowing ===
Spain's 1900 Olympic debut included 5 rowers, a men's single sculler and a men's coxed four team (for which the sculler served as coxswain).

Games	Rowers	Events	Gold	Silver	Bronze	Total	Ranking
1984 Los Ángeles	10	3/14	0	1	0	1	12
Total			0	1	0	1	43

=== Sailing ===
Games	No. Sailors	Events	Gold	Silver	Bronze	Total	Ranking
(United States) Los Angeles 1932	1	1/4	0	0	1	1	7
(Canada) Montreal 1976	10	5/6	0	1	0	1	8
(Soviet Union) Moscow 1980	7	4/6	1	0	0	1	5
(United States) Los Angeles 1984	8	5/7	1	0	0	1	3
(South Korea) Seoul 1988	16	8/8	1	0	0	1	5
(Spain) Barcelona 1992	17	10/10	4	1	0	5	1
(United States) Atlanta 1996	16	10/10	2	0	0	2	2
(Greece) Athens 2004	18	11/11	1	2	0	3	3
(China) Beijing 2008	16	10/11	1	1	0	2	3
(United Kingdom) London 2012	14	9/10	2	0	0	2	2
(Japan) Tokyo 2020	15	10/10	0	0	2	2	15
(France) Paris 2024	13	9/10	1	0	0	1	7
Total			14	5	3	22	6

Event	No. of appearances	First appearance	First medal	First gold medal	Gold	Silver	Bronze	Total	Best finish
O-Jolle	0/1	1936	—N/a	—N/a	0	0	0	0	—N/a
Firefly	1/1	1948	—N/a	—N/a	0	0	0	0	19th (1948)
Swallow	0/1	1948	—N/a	—N/a	0	0	0	0	—N/a
Star	?/18	1948	—N/a	—N/a	0	0	0	0	7th (1984, 1996)
Dragon	?/6	1960	—N/a	—N/a	0	0	0	0	15th (1972)
Finn	18/18	1952	1988	1988	2	1	1	4	(gold) (1988, 1992)
12m² Sharpie	0/1	1956	—N/a	—N/a	0	0	0	0	—N/a
Flying Dutchman	9/9	1960	1980	1980	2	0	0	2	(gold) (1980, 1992)
Tempest	1/2	1976	—N/a	—N/a	0	0	0	0	9th (1976)
Soling	?/8	1976	—N/a	—N/a	0	0	0	0	6th (1992)
Men's 470	11/12	1976	1976	1984	2	1	1	4	(gold) (1984, 1992)
Tornado	?/9	1988	1996	1996	2	0	0	2	(gold) (1996, 2008)
Division II	1/1	1988	—N/a	—N/a	0	0	0	0	8th (1988)
Women's 470	?/9	1988	1992	1992	2	1	0	3	(gold) (1992, 1996)
Men's Lechner A-390	1/1	1992	—N/a	—N/a	0	0	0	0	6th (1992)
Women's Lechner A-390	1/1	1992	—N/a	—N/a	0	0	0	0	12th (1992)
Europe	4/4	1992	1992	—N/a	0	1	0	0	(silver) (1992)
Men's Mistral One Design	3/3	1996	—N/a	—N/a	0	0	0	0	15th (1996)
Women's Mistral One Design	3/3	1996	—N/a	—N/a	0	0	0	0	8th (2000, 2004)
Laser	?/7	1996	—N/a	—N/a	0	0	0	0	10th (2004)
49er	7/7	2000	2004	2004	2	1	0	3	(gold) (2004, 2024)
Men's RS:X	4/4	2008	—N/a	—N/a	0	0	0	0	9th (2008, 2016)
Women's RS:X	3/4	2008	2012	2012	1	0	0	0	(gold) (2012)
Laser Radial	4/4	2012	—N/a	—N/a	0	0	0	0	11th (2012)
Elliott 6m	1/1	2012	2012	2012	1	0	0	1	(gold) (2012)
49er FX	2/2	2016	—N/a	—N/a	0	0	0	0	4th (2016, 2020)
Nacra 17	2/2	2016	—N/a	—N/a	0	0	0	0	6th (2020)
Mixed 470	1/1	2024	—N/a	—N/a	0	0	0	0	4th (2024)

=== Ski mountaineering ===
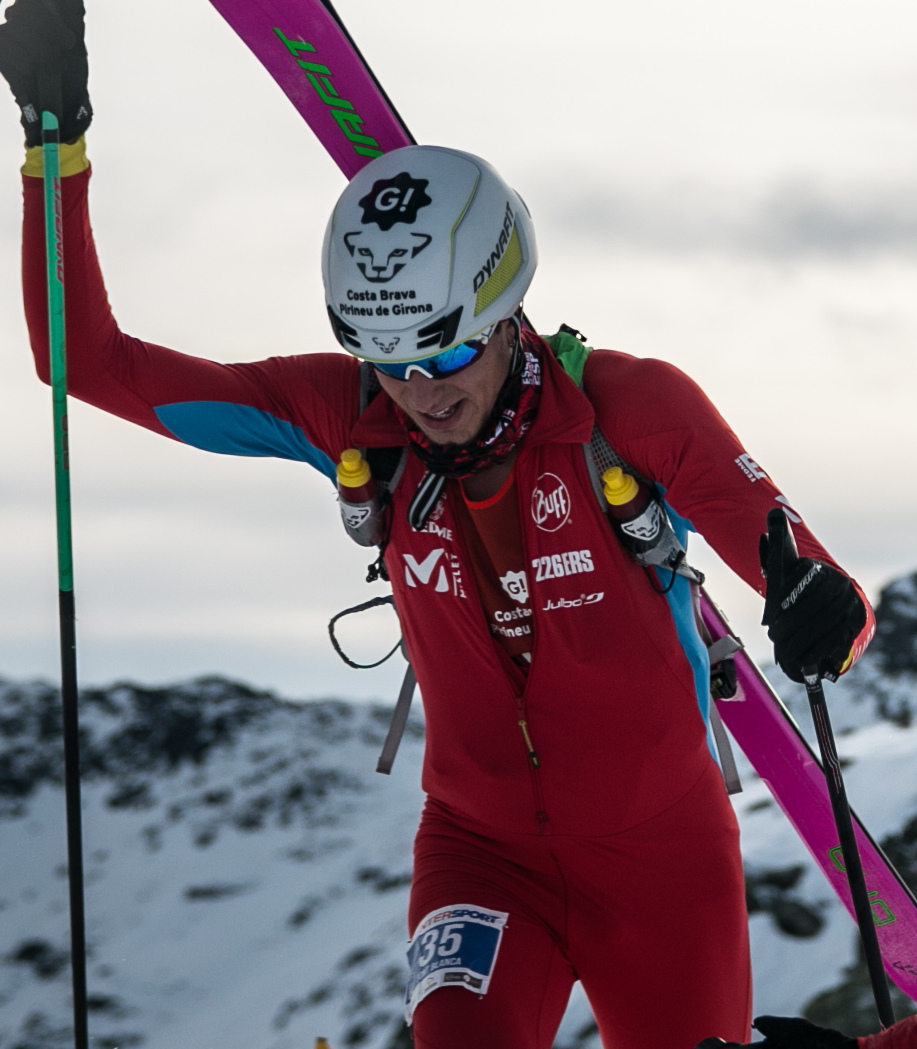
Oriol Cardona brought Spain its first gold medal in 54 years after becoming Olympic champion in the 2026 Winter Olympics.

Games	Events	Gold	Silver	Bronze	Total	Ranking
(Italy) 2026 Milano-Cortina	3/3	1	0	2	3	3
Total		1	0	2	3	3

Event	No. of appearances	First appearance	First medal	First gold medal	Gold	Silver	Bronze	Total	Best finish
Men's sprint	1/1	2026	2026	2026	1	0	0	1	(gold) (2026)
Women's sprint	1/1	2026	2026	—N/a	0	0	1	1	(bronze) (2026)
Mixed relay	1/1	2026	—N/a	—N/a	0	0	1	1	(bronze) (2026)

=== Sport climbing ===
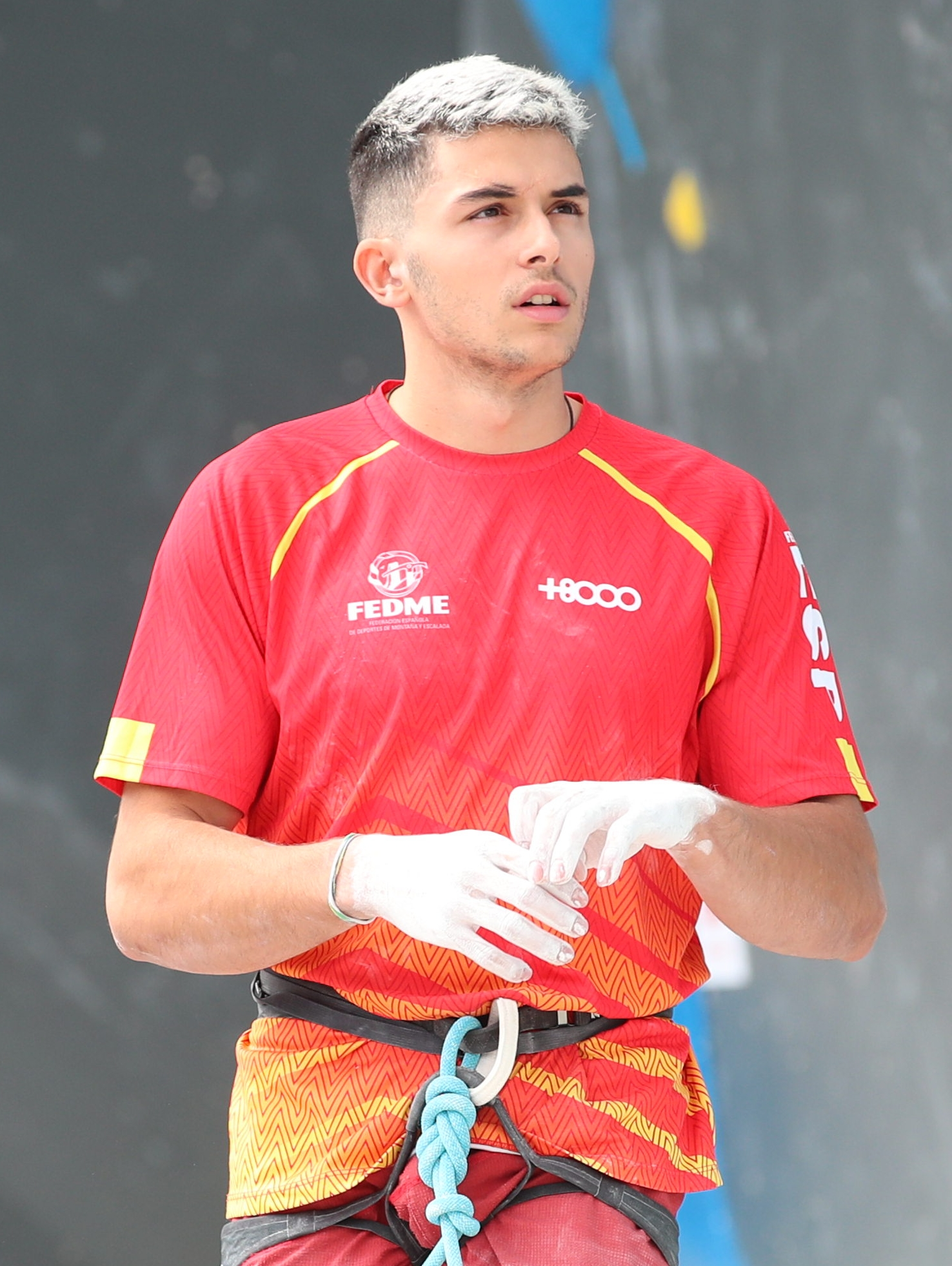
Alberto Ginés was the first men's sport climbing Olympic champion after winning gold in Tokyo 2020 for Spain.

Games	Events	Gold	Silver	Bronze	Total	Ranking
(Japan) 2020 Tokyo	1/2	1	0	0	1	1
Total		1	0	0	1	3

Event	No. of appearances	First appearance	First medal	First gold medal	Gold	Silver	Bronze	Total	Best finish
Men's combined	2/2	2020	2020	2020	1	0	0	1	(gold) (2020)
Women's speed	1/1	2024	—N/a	—N/a	0	0	0	0	8th (2024)

=== Swimming ===
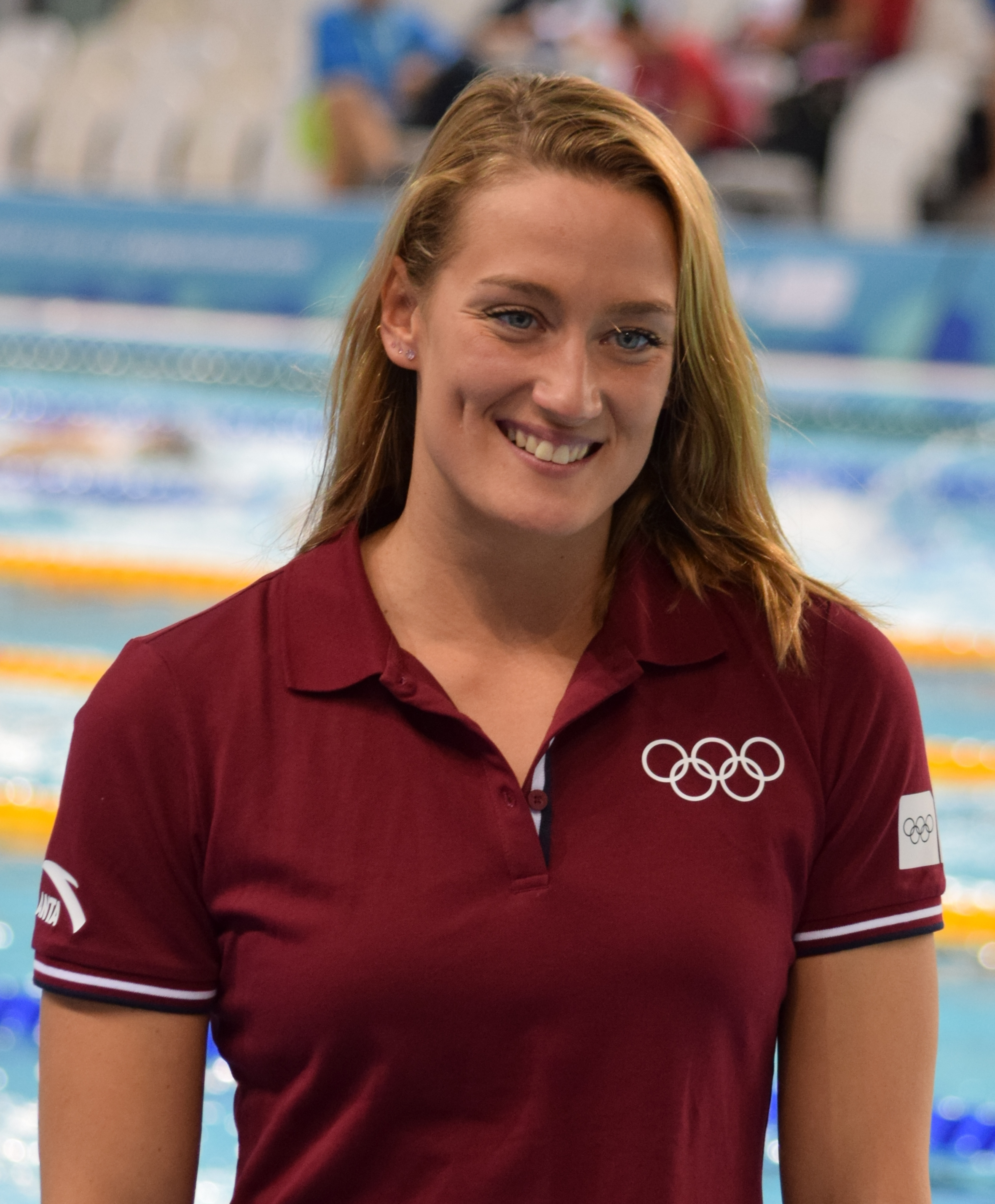
Mireia Belmonte has won half of Spain's 8 medals in swimming – including one gold and Spain's two silver medals.

Games	Gold	Silver	Bronze	Total	Ranking
(Russia) 1980 Moscow	0	0	1	1	7
(South Korea) 1988 Seoul	0	0	1	1	20
(Spain) 1992 Barcelona	1	0	0	1	8
(Australia) 2000 Sydney	0	0	1	1	16
(United Kingdom) 2012 London	0	2	0	2	12
(Brazil) 2016 Rio de Janeiro	1	0	1	2	11
Total	2	2	4	8	27

Event	Gold	Silver	Bronze	Total	Best finish
Men's 50m freestyle	0	0	0	0	—N/a
Men's 100m freestyle	0	0	0	0	—N/a
Men's 200m freestyle	0	0	0	0	—N/a
Men's 400m freestyle	0	0	0	0	—N/a
Men's 800m freestyle	0	0	0	0	—N/a
Men's 1500m freestyle	0	0	0	0	6th (1980)
Men's 100m backstroke	0	0	0	0	4th (1992, 1996)
Men's 200m backstroke	1	0	0	1	(gold) (1992)
Men's 100m breaststroke	0	0	0	0	—N/a
Men's 200m breaststroke	0	0	1	1	(bronze) (1988)
Men's 100m butterfly	0	0	1	1	(bronze) (1980)
Men's 200m butterfly	0	0	0	0	—N/a
Men's 200m medley	0	0	0	0	—N/a
Men's 400m medley	0	0	0	0	8th (2016)
Men's 4×100m freestyle relay	0	0	0	0	8th (1972)
Men's 4×200m freestyle relay	0	0	0	0	—N/a
Men's 10km open water	0	0	0	0	13th (2008)
4×100m medley relay	0	0	0	0	—N/a
Women's 50m freestyle	0	0	0	0	—N/a
Women's 100m freestyle	0	0	0	0	—N/a
Women's 200m freestyle	0	0	0	0	—N/a
Women's 400m freestyle	0	0	0	0	—N/a
Women's 800m freestyle	0	1	0	0	(silver) (2012)
Women's 1500m freestyle	0	0	0	0	—N/a
Women's 100m backstroke	0	0	1	1	(bronze) (2000)
Women's 200m backstroke	0	0	0	0	6th (2000)
Women's 100m breaststroke	0	0	0	0	—N/a
Women's 200m breaststroke	0	0	0	0	—N/a
Women's 100m butterfly	0	0	0	0	—N/a
Women's 200m butterfly	1	1	0	2	(gold) (2016)
Women's 200m medley	0	0	0	0	—N/a
Women's 400m medley	0	0	1	1	(bronze) (2016)
Women's 4×100m freestyle relay	0	0	0	0	8th (1980)
Women's 4×200m freestyle relay	0	0	0	0	6th (2004)
Women's 10km open water	0	0	0	0	7th (2012)

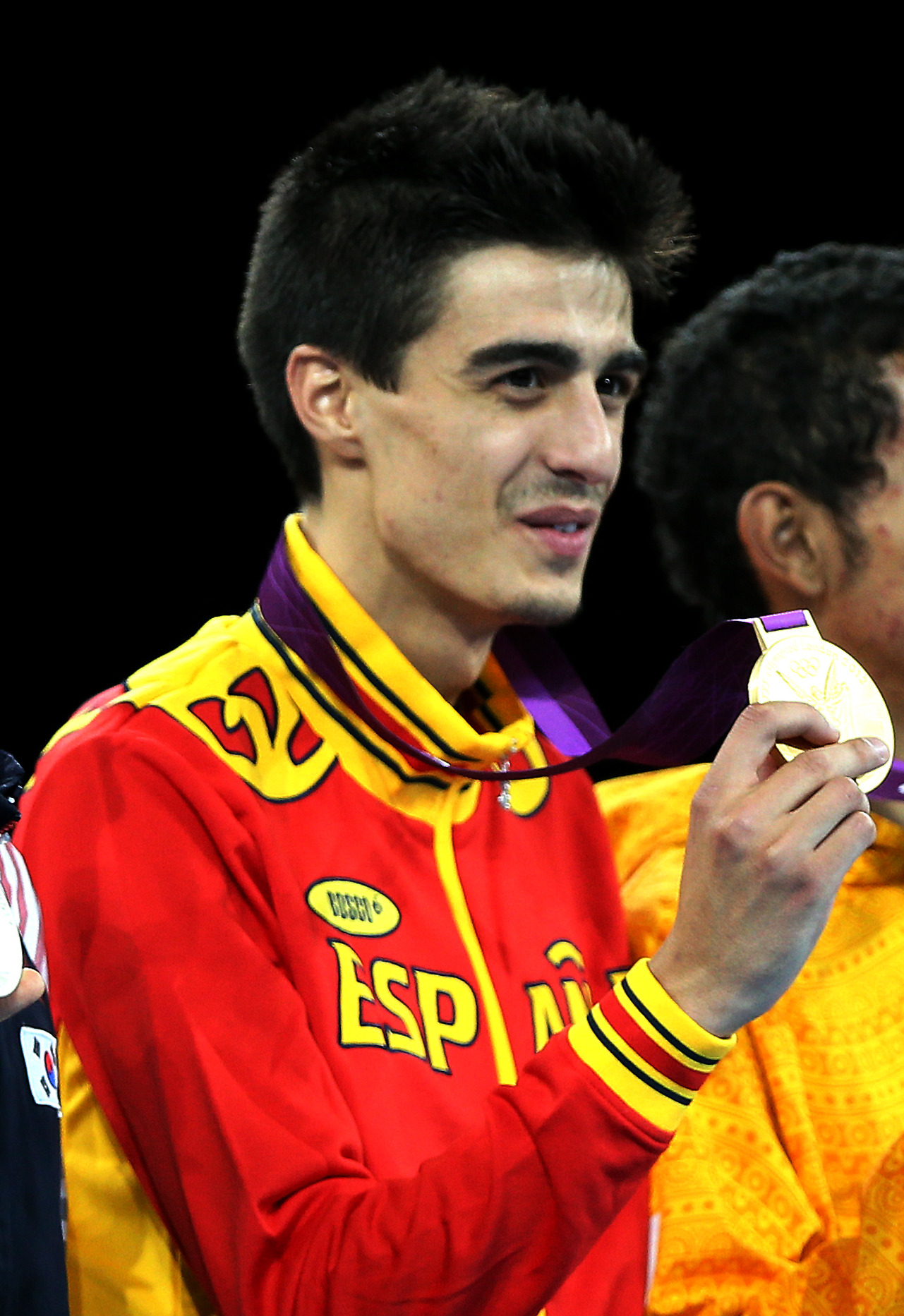
Joel González is Spain's only gold medallist in taekwondo

=== Taekwondo ===
Games	Participants	Events	Gold	Silver	Bronze	Total	Ranking
(Australia) 2000 Sydney	4	4/8	0	1	0	1	7
(United Kingdom) 2012 London	3	3/8	1	2	0	3	1
(Brazil) 2016 Rio Janeiro	3	3/8	0	1	1	2	7
(Japan) 2020 Tokyo	4	4/8	0	1	0	1	10
Total			1	5	1	7	13

Event	No. of appearances	First appearance	First medal	First gold medal	Gold	Silver	Bronze	Total	Best finish
Men's Heavyweight	2/7	2004	—N/a	—N/a	0	0	0	0	QF (2004)
Men's Middleweight	2/7	2012	2012	—N/a	0	1	0	1	(silver) (2012)
Men's Featherweight	4/7	2000	2016	—N/a	0	0	1	1	(bronze) (2016)
Men's Flyweight	7/7	2000	2000	2012	1	1	0	2	(gold) (2012)
Women's Heavyweight	2/7	2000	—N/a	—N/a	0	0	0	0	QF (2000)
Women's Middleweight	2/7	2000	—N/a	—N/a	0	0	0	0	R16 (2000, 2024)
Women's Featherweight	2/7	2004	2016	—N/a	0	1	0	1	(silver) (2016)
Women's Flyweight	4/7	2004	2012	—N/a	0	2	0	2	(silver) (2012, 2020)

=== Tennis ===
Games	No. Players	Events	Gold	Silver	Bronze	Total	Ranking
(South Korea) Seoul 1988	3	2/4	0	1	0	1	4
(Spain) Barcelona 1992	6	4/4	0	2	1	3	4
(United States) Atlanta 1996	7	4/4	0	2	1	3	3
(Australia) Sydney 2000	7	4/4	0	0	1	1	7
(Greece) Athens 2004	10	4/4	0	1	0	1	4
(China) Beijing 2008	9	4/4	1	1	0	2	2
(Brazil) Rio de Janeiro 2016	9	5/5	1	0	0	1	2
(Japan) Tokyo 2020	8	4/5	0	0	1	1	6
(France) Paris 2024	8	5/5	0	1	1	2	6
Total			2	8	5	15	8

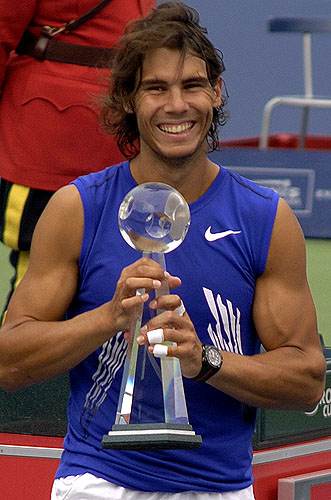
Both Spanish gold medals in tennis have been won by Rafa Nadal

Event	No. of appearances	First appearance	First medal	First gold medal	Gold	Silver	Bronze	Total	Best finish
Men's singles	12/17	1920	1992	2008	1	3	1	5	Gold (2008)
Men's doubles	12/17	1920	1988	2016	1	1	1	3	Gold (2016)
Women's singles	12/15	1920	1992	—N/a	0	1	1	2	Silver (1996)
Women's doubles	10/15	1924	1992	—N/a	0	3	2	5	Silver (1992, 2004, 2008)

=== Volleyball ===
Games	Events	Gold	Silver	Bronze	Total	Ranking
(Greece) 2004 Athens	1/4	0	1	0	1	5
Total		0	1	0	1	9

Event	No. of appearances	First appearance	First medal	First gold medal	Gold	Silver	Bronze	Total	Best finish
Men's indoor tournament	2/15	1992	—N/a	—N/a	0	0	0	0	8th (1992)
Women's indoor tournament	1/15	1992	—N/a	—N/a	0	0	0	0	8th (1992)
Men's beach tournament	7/7	1996	2004	—N/a	0	1	0	1	(silver) (2004)
Women's beach tournament	3/7	2012	—N/a	—N/a	0	0	0	7	—N/a

=== Waterpolo ===
Games	Events	Gold	Silver	Bronze	Total	Ranking
(Belgium) Antwerp 1920	1/1	0	0	0	0	5
(France) Paris 1924	1/1	0	0	0	0	10
(Netherlands) Amsterdam 1928	1/1	0	0	0	0	9
(United Kingdom) London 1948	1/1	0	0	0	0	8
(Finland) Helsinki 1952	1/1	0	0	0	0	8
1968 Mexico City	1/1	0	0	0	0	9
(West Germany) 1972 Munich	1/1	0	0	0	0	10
(Soviet Union) 1980 Moscow	1/1	0	0	0	0	4
(United States) 1984 Los Angeles	1/1	0	0	0	0	4
(South Korea) 1988 Seoul	1/1	0	0	0	0	6
(Spain) 1992 Barcelona	1/1	0	1	0	1	2
(United States) 1996 Atlanta	1/1	1	0	0	1	1
(United Kingdom) 2012 London	2/2	0	1	0	1	3
(Japan) 2020 Tokyo	2/2	0	1	0	1	3
(France) 2024 Paris	2/2	1	0	0	1	1
Total		2	3	0	5	7

=== Weightlifting ===
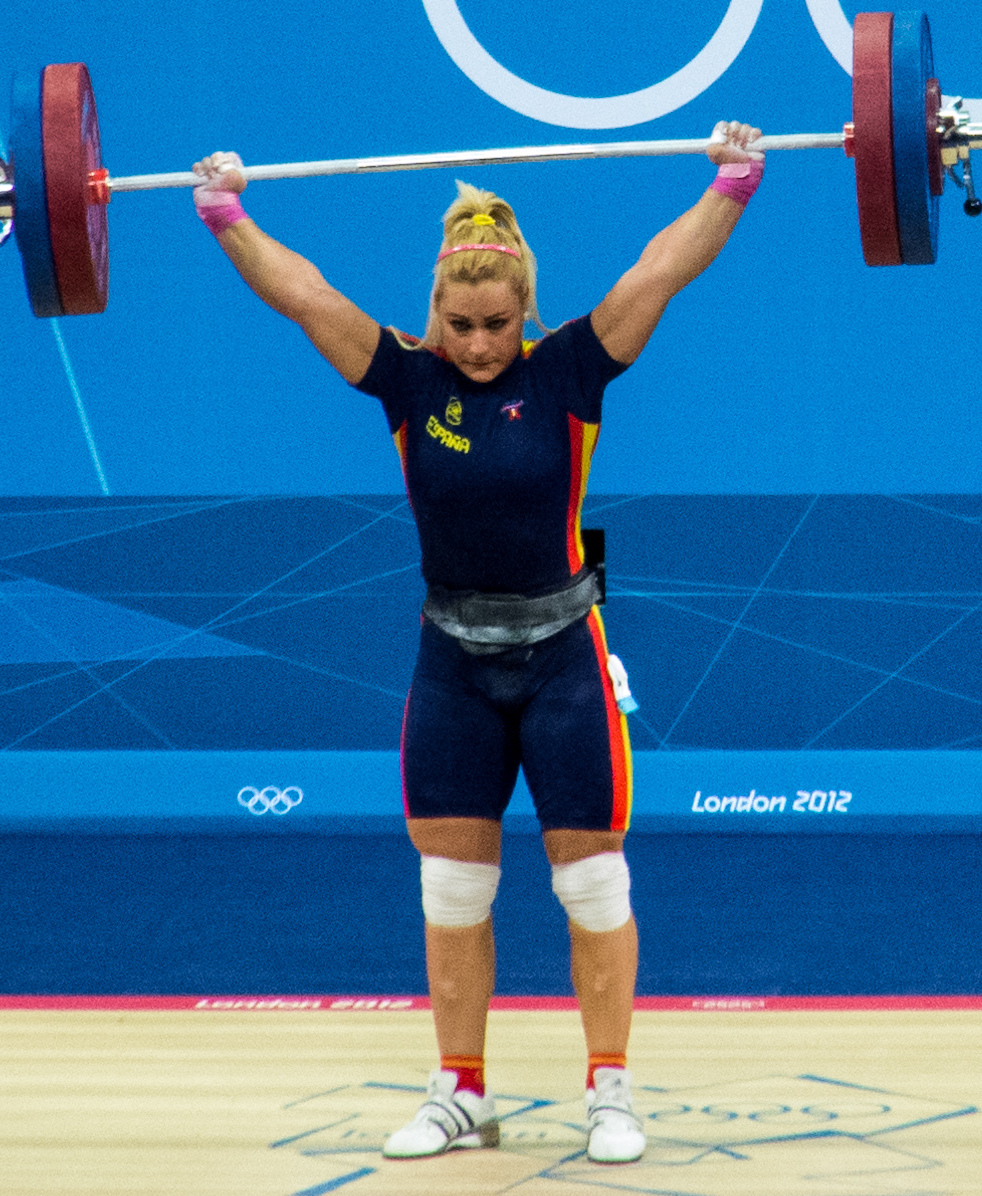
Lydia Valentín is Spain's only weightlifting medallist

Games	Gold	Silver	Bronze	Total	Ranking
(China) 2008 Beijing	0	1	0	1	13
(United Kingdom) 2012 London	1	0	0	1	5
(Brazil) 2016 Rio Janeiro	0	0	1	1	16
Total	1	1	1	3	42

== See also ==
- List of flag bearers for Spain at the Olympics
- Category:Olympic competitors for Spain
- Spain at the Paralympics
