= Tanigawa =

Tanigawa may refer to:

- Tanigawa (surname)
- Tanigawa (train), a Japanese train service
- Mount Tanigawa, a Japanese mountain

== See also ==
- Tanikawa
