= Cycling at the 1996 Summer Olympics – Women's cross-country =

Cycling at the Olympics

Women's cross-country at the Games of the XXVI Olympiad
- Venue: Georgia International Horse Park, Conyers
- Date: 30 July
- Competitors: 29 from 12 nations
- Winning time: 1:50:51

Medalists
1st place, gold medalist(s)		Paola Pezzo; Italy
2nd place, silver medalist(s)		Alison Sydor; Canada
3rd place, bronze medalist(s)		Susan DeMattei; United States

These are the official results of the Women's Mountainbike Race at the 1996 Summer Olympics in Atlanta, Georgia. There were a total number of 27 participants, with two non-finishers, in this inaugural Olympic event, over 31.8 kilometres, held on July 30, 1996. The mountain biking events were held at the Georgia International Horse Park in Conyers, Georgia, located 30 miles (50 km) east of Atlanta.

== Final classification ==
RANK	CYCLIST	NOC	TIME
	Paola Pezzo	Italy	1:50.51
	Alison Sydor	Canada	1:51.58
	Susan DeMattei	United States	1:52.36
4.	Gunn-Rita Dahle	Norway	1:53.50
5.	Elsbeth Vink	Netherlands	1:54.38
6.	Annabella Stropparo	Italy	1:55.56
7.	Regina Marunde	Germany	1:57.21
8.	Kathy Lynch	New Zealand	1:57.40
9.	Eva Orvošová	Slovakia	1:57.56
10.	Juli Furtado	United States	1:58.32
11.	Laurence Leboucher	France	1:59.00
12.	Daniela Gassmann	Switzerland	1:59.11
13.	Lesley Tomlinson	Canada	2:01.04
14.	Alla Yepifanova	Russia	2:01.35
15.	Mary Grigson	Australia	2:02.38
16.	Silvia Fürst	Switzerland	2:03.04
17.	Erica Green	South Africa	2:03.06
18.	Kateřina Neumannová	Czech Republic	2:04.03
19.	Kateřina Hanušová	Czech Republic	2:04.05
20.	Laura Blanco	Spain	2:04.20
21.	Lenka Ilavská	Slovakia	2:04.43
22.	Deb Murrell	Great Britain	2:04.44
23.	Kanako Tanikawa	Japan	2:05.44
24.	Sandra Temporelli	France	2:06.57
25.	Gao Hongying	China	2:09.08
26.	Silvia Rovira	Spain	2:09.17
27.	Nadezhda Pashkova	Russia	2:16.36
—	Caroline Alexander	Great Britain	DNF
—	Sandra Ambrosio	Argentina	DNF

== See also ==
- Men's Cross Country Race
