= Tanigawa (surname) =

Tanigawa (written: 谷川) is a Japanese surname. Notable people with the surname include:

- Airi Tanigawa (谷川 愛梨; born 1995), Japanese idol and singer
- Akiko Tanigawa (谷川 章子; born 1977), Japanese ten-pin bowler
- Hideki Tanigawa (born 1977), Japanese sumo wrestler and coach
- Mitsuaki Tanigawa (born 1943), Japanese burglar
- Kōji Tanigawa (谷川 浩司; born 1962), Japanese shogi player
- Nagaru Tanigawa (谷川 流; born 1970), Japanese writer
- Satoru Tanigawa (谷川 聡; born 1972), Japanese hurdler
- Shuzen Tanigawa (谷川 秀善; born 1934), Japanese politician
- Yaichi Tanigawa (谷川 弥一; born 1941), Japanese politician

== See also ==
- Tanikawa
