= Nadezhda Pashkova =

Russian cyclist

Personal information
- Born: 15 November 1962 (age 63) Yagunkino, Russia

Cycling career
- Sport: Cycling

Nadezhda Pashkova (born 15 November 1962) is a Russian cyclist. She competed in the women's cross-country mountain biking event at the 1996 Summer Olympics.
