= Gao Hongying =

Chinese cyclist

Personal information
- Born: 24 December 1970 (age 55)

Cycling career
- Sport: Cycling

Gao Hongying (born 24 December 1970) is a Chinese cyclist. She competed in the women's cross-country mountain biking event at the 1996 Summer Olympics.
