= Basque pelota at the 1900 Summer Olympics =

Basque pelota at the Games of the II Olympiad
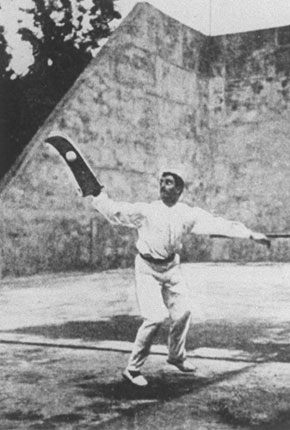
- In addition to the scheduled amateur Basque pelota tournament, a professional tournament was played at Borghese Street, number 26, Neuilly-sur-Seine.
- Venue: Neuilly-sur-Seine
- Date: 14 June 1900
- Competitors: 2 from 1 nation

Medalists
1st place, gold medalist(s)		José de Amézola, Francisco Villota	Spain

At the 1900 Summer Olympics, a Basque pelota tournament was contested.

Only two teams entered - one from Spain and one from France - but the French team of Maurice Durquetty and Etchegaray withdrew on the afternoon of the single contest due to a disagreement about the rules. Therefore, the contest was scratched, and the Spanish team was awarded first prize.

This is the only Olympics to date where pelota was an official sport, being revived at the 1924, 1968 and 1992 Games as a demonstration sport.

== Medalists ==
Gold	Silver	Bronze
Spain José de Amézola; Francisco Villota	only one team entered	only one team entered

== Medal table ==
Accurate as of the conclusion of the 1900 Olympics.

Rank	Nation	Gold	Silver	Bronze	Total
1	Spain	1	0	0	1
Totals (1 entries)		1	0	0	1
