= Deb Murrell =

British cyclist

Personal information
- Born: 24 July 1966 (age 60) Ditchingham, England

Cycling career
- Sport: Cycling

Deb Murrell (born 24 July 1966) is a British cyclist. She competed in the women's cross-country mountain biking event at the 1996 Summer Olympics.
