= Maurice Durquetty =

French pelotari

Personal information
- Full name: Maurice Durquetty
- Nickname: Durquetty

Sport
- Country: France
- Sport: Basque pelota

Maurice Durquetty (Basque: Maurizio Durquety) was a French pelotari who competed at the 1900 Summer Olympics in Paris, France.

Durquetty competed in the only official pelota contest in Olympic history, the Basque pelota at the 1900 Summer Olympics two-man teams event. He and his partner Etchegaray lost to the Spanish team, Francisco Villota and José de Amézola y Aspizúa.
