= Ski mountaineering at the Winter Olympics =

- IOC Code: SMT
- Governing body: ISMF
- Events: 3 (men: 1; women: 1; mixed: 1)

Winter Olympics
- 1924; 1928; 1932; 1936; 1948; 1952; 1956; 1960; 1964; 1968; 1972; 1976; 1980; 1984; 1988; 1992; 1994; 1998; 2002; 2006; 2010; 2014; 2018; 2022; 2026
- Medalists

The 2026 Winter Olympics included the sport of ski mountaineering for the first time. There were three medal events: men's and women's sprint and a mixed relay. Two additional events, the men's and women's individual, were proposed but not approved for the final program.

Prior to becoming part of the Olympic Games, ski mountaineering was held at the 2020 Winter Youth Olympics.

== Summary ==
Games	Year	Events	Best Nation
1 → 24			
25	2026	3	France (1)
26	2030	5	

== Medal table ==
NOCs in italics no longer compete at the Winter Olympics.
Sources (after the 2026 Winter Olympics)
Accurate as of 2026 Winter Olympics.

Rank	Nation	Gold	Silver	Bronze	Total
1	France	1	1	1	3
2	Switzerland	1	1	0	2
3	Spain	1	0	2	3
4	Individual Neutral Athletes	0	1	0	1
Totals (4 entries)		3	3	3	9
