= Tanikawa =

Tanikawa (written: 谷川, "valley river") is a Japanese surname. Notable people with the surname include:

- Harue Tanikawa (谷川 治恵; born 1954), Japanese shogi player
- Kanako Tanikawa (谷川 可奈子; born 1970), Japanese cyclist
- Momoko Tanikawa (谷川 萌々子; born 2005), Japanese footballer
- Sadaharu Tanikawa (谷川 貞治; born 1961), Japanese combat sports promoter
- Shuntarō Tanikawa (谷川 俊太郎; born 1931), Japanese poet and translator
- Teijiro Tanikawa (谷川 禎次郎; 1932–2025), Japanese swimmer
- Tetsuzō Tanikawa (谷川 徹三; 1895–1989), Japanese philosopher
- Tsuyoshi Tanikawa (谷川 烈; born 1980), Japanese footballer

== See also ==
- 10117 Tanikawa, a main-belt asteroid
- Tanikawa Station, a railway station in Tamba, Hyōgo Prefecture, Japan
- Tanigawa
