= Sandra Ambrosio =

Argentine cyclist

Personal information
- Born: 10 April 1963 (age 63)

Cycling career
- Sport: Cycling

Sandra Ambrosio Monica (born 10 April 1963) is an Argentine former cyclist. She competed in the women's cross-country mountain biking event at the 1996 Summer Olympics.
