= Susan DeMattei =

American cyclist (born 1962)

Personal information
- Full name: Susan DeMattei
- Born: October 15, 1962 (age 64) United States

Cycling career
- Sport: Cycling
- Disciplines: Road & MTB
- Role: Rider
Medal record
Women's mountain bike racing
Representing the United States
Olympic Games
Bronze medal – third place	1996 Atlanta	Mountainbike

Susan DeMattei (born October 15, 1962) is an American former professional cross-country mountain bike racer. She became the first American woman to win an Olympic medal in mountain biking when she won the bronze medal in the inaugural Olympic Cross-Country Mountain Biking competition at the 1996 Olympic Games in Atlanta, Georgia. DeMattei was inducted into the Mountain Bike Hall of Fame in 1997 and, into the United States Bicycling Hall of Fame in 2012.

== Bicycle racing career ==
Born in Marin County, DeMattei grew up in San Rafael, California. She first became interested in cycling while attending California State University, Chico, where she was pursuing her nursing degree. She began as a recreational road cyclist before taking up mountain bike racing. DeMattei was a talented climber, and almost immediately after taking up cycling, she was setting local road hillclimb records with times out of reach of most of the male competitors. She tried her hand at mountain bike racing, to even greater success, and was quickly signed to a professional contract by the Diamondback racing team.

From 1990 through 1996, DeMattei finished in the top three in the NORBA Championship Series every year but one. DeMattei won the silver medal in the cross-country class at the 1994 UCI Mountain Bike World Championships in Vail, Colorado.

== Later life ==
DeMattei married former professional mountain bike racer and teammate, Dave Wiens. She currently resides in Gunnison, Colorado where she works in the surgical unit of a local hospital.

== Races and results ==
Results
Year	Rank	Location	Discipline	Race
1989	2	Spa (Liege), Belgium	Mountainbike, XC, Elite (F)	World Championship
1989	3	Redding, USA	Mountainbike (F) (f)	
1989	2	Vacaville, CA, USA	Mountainbike (F)	
1989	3	Gunnison, USA	Mountainbike (F) (b)	
1989	2	Big Bear Lake, CA, USA	Mountainbike (F)	
1989	2	Ashland-Siskiyou, OR, USA	Mountainbike (F)	
1989	3	Great Gorge, USA	Mountainbike (F) (a)	
1989	3	USA	Mountainbike, XC	National Championship
1989	2	Cannes, France	Mountainbike (F)	
1991	1	Berlin, Germany	Mountainbike (F)	
1991	5		Mountainbike, XC, Elite (F)	World Cup
1992	3	Hunter Mountain, CA, USA	Mountainbike (F)	
1992	2	Mammoth Lakes, CA, USA	Mountainbike (F)	
1993	3	Vail, CO, USA	Mountainbike (F)	
1993	2	Mammoth Lakes, CA, USA	Mountainbike (F)	
1993	2	Plymouth, Great Britain	Mountainbike (F)	
1994	3	Madrid, Spain	Mountainbike (F)	
1994	2	Plymouth, Great Britain	Mountainbike (F)	
1994	1	Cairns, Australia	Mountainbike (F)	
1994	2	Vail, CO, USA	Mountainbike, XC, Elite (F)	World Championship
1996	3	USA	Mountainbike (F)	Olympic Games
