= Francisco Villota =

Spanish pelotari (1873–1950)

Personal information
- Full name: Francisco Villota y Baquiola
- Born: 18 November 1873 Madrid, Spain
- Died: 7 January 1950 (aged 76) Madrid, Spain

Sport
- Country: Spain
- Sport: Basque pelota
Medal record
Men's Basque pelota
Representing Spain
Gold medal – first place	1900 Paris	Two-man teams

Francisco Villota y Baquiola (18 November 1873 – 7 January 1950) was a Spanish pelotari (player of Basque pelota) who competed at the 1900 Summer Olympics in Paris, where he won Spain's first-ever Olympic Medal.

== Career ==
Born on 18 November 1873 in Madrid to a "very distinguished" Santander family, Villota competed in the only official pelota contest in Olympic history, the Basque pelota at the 1900 Summer Olympics two-man teams event. He and his partner José de Amézola y Aspizúa were given the silver medal (equivalent nowadays to the gold medal) after achieving the first place without having to play, since the only other contestants, the French team, Maurice Durquetty and Etchegaray, withdrew due to a disagreement about the rules.

In addition to playing pelota basque, Villota was president of the Euskal-Jai Club of Madrid, from which position he helped organize pelota tournaments in Madrid between April 1908 and April 1910. Known as an all-around athlete who was "strong and muscular", he played football and once completed a walk from Madrid to El Escorial in just eight hours. In May 1919, he contributed 10 pesetas to a subscription for a crown "in homage to France".

== Legacy ==
For nearly a century, it was widely believed that the Spanish delegation that participated in the 1900 Olympics was made up of only seven athletes: Four rowers with their cox, the fencer Mauricio Ponce de Léon, and the pigeon shooter Pedro Pidal y Bernaldo de Quirós. Villota and Amézola remained in complete oblivion until a thesis published by the researcher Bill Mallon in 1998, which was given official status by the International Olympic Committee (IOC) in 2004, who thus recognized their gold medals and officially declared them as the first Spanish medalists. Even then, however, Villota remained practically unknown and of uncertain identity for several decades since he was only cited in the IOC database as a "pelota medalist from Madrid in 1900"; it was not until August 2008, amidst a controversy revolving around Spain's 100th Olympic medal, that both his first nameand and his image were uncovered by the Spanish sports historian Fernando Arrechea.

== Bibliography ==
- Mallon, Bill (1998). The 1900 Olympic Games, Results for All Competitors in All Events, with Commentary. Jefferson, North Carolina: McFarland & Company, Inc., Publishers. ISBN 0-7864-0378-0.
