= Kanako Tanikawa =

Japanese cyclist

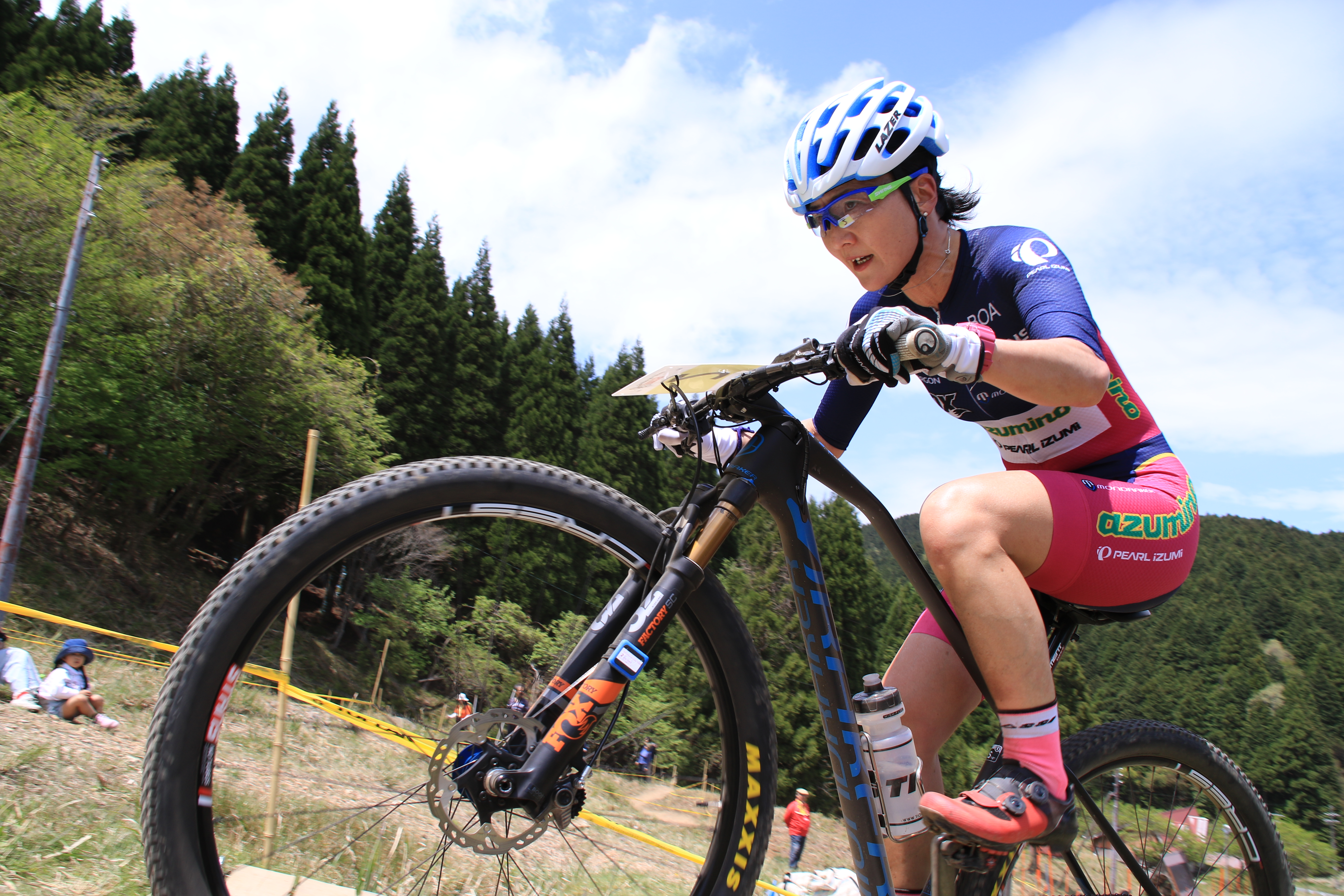

Personal information
- Born: 24 May 1970 (age 56) Tokyo, Japan

Cycling career
- Sport: Cycling

Kanako Tanikawa (谷川 可奈子, Tanikawa Kanako; born 24 May 1970) is a Japanese cyclist. She competed in the women's cross-country mountain biking event at the 1996 Summer Olympics.
