= María Olay =

Spanish swimmer (born 1978)

Personal information
- Born: 3 June 1978 (age 48)
Medal record
Women's Swimming
Representing Spain
European Championships (LC)
Bronze medal – third place	1995 Vienna	4×100 m medley relay

María Olay García (born 3 June 1978 in Gijón, Asturias) is a former breaststroke swimmer from Spain, who competed at the 1996 Summer Olympics in Atlanta, Georgia for her native country. In the Georgia Tech Aquatic Center she finished in 28th place in the 100 m breaststroke, and was eliminated with the women's relay team in the 4×100 m medley (15th position).
