= Laura Blanco =

Spanish cyclist (born 1965)

Personal information
- Born: 6 October 1965 (age 61) Andújar, Spain

Cycling career
- Sport: Cycling

Laura Blanco (born 6 October 1965) is a Spanish former cyclist. She competed in the women's cross-country mountain biking event at the 1996 Summer Olympics.
