= José de Amézola y Aspizúa =

Spanish pelotari and politician

Personal information
- Full name: José de Amézola y Aspizua
- Born: 9 January 1874 Izarra, Álava, Spain
- Died: 1922 (aged 47–48) Cercedilla, Spain

Sport
- Country: Spain
- Sport: Basque pelota
Medal record
Men's Basque pelota
Gold medal – first place	1900 Paris	Two-man teams

José de Amézola y Aspizua (Basque: José Ametzola Aspizua; 9 January 1874 – 1922) was a Spanish Basque pelotari who competed at the 1900 Summer Olympics in Paris, France.

Amezola entered in the only official pelota contest in Olympic history, the Basque pelota at the 1900 Summer Olympics two-man teams event. He and his partner Francisco Villota defeated the French team, Maurice Durquetty and Etchegaray, by default (walkover). This was Spain's first ever Olympic Medal.

== See also ==
- List of Basques

== Sources ==
- De Wael, Herman. Herman's Full Olympians: "Pelota 1900". Accessed 25 February 2006. Available electronically at.
- Mallon, Bill (1998). The 1900 Olympic Games, Results for All Competitors in All Events, with Commentary. Jefferson, North Carolina: McFarland & Company, Inc., Publishers. ISBN 0-7864-0378-0.
- Arrechea, Fernando. http://olimpismo2007.blogspot.com
