= Ninja of Heisei =

Japanese criminal (born 1943)

Mitsuaki Tanigawa
- Born: 1943 (age 82–83)
- Other name: Ninja of Heisei
- Years active: 2009–2017
- Status: Arrested
- Criminal charges: Multiple counts of theft and trespassing

Details
- Country: Japan
- Locations: Higashiosaka, Osaka

Mitsuaki Tanigawa (谷川満昭, Tanigawa Mitsuaki; born 1943), also known as the Ninja of Heisei (平成の忍者, Heisei no ninja), is a Japanese criminal who gained notoriety for conducting a series of more than 254 break-ins in Osaka, Japan, while wearing a ninja outfit. Operating from March 2009 to June 2017, Tanigawa successfully executed over 250 break-ins. Initially thought to be younger, he was caught in July 2017 at the age of 74. His ninja persona gained significant public interest and was reported by various local and international news outlets at the time.

== Crimes ==
Tanigawa told police he "hated working and thought stealing is quicker." He meticulously planned escape routes and execution prior to his break-ins, notably doing unexpected feats such as navigating tight spaces and running on walls, typically while dressed as a stereotypical ninja. He was rarely caught on surveillance cameras, leading police to suspect local residents of his burglaries. An investigator (speaking in Japanese) commented that "he moved in a way that you wouldn't expect from someone of his age."

== Arrest ==
In July 2017, Tanigawa was caught on a surveillance camera removing his face covering. Police officers followed him to an abandoned building, and he came out wearing a ninja costume. Tanigawa was arrested and admitted and was charged with over 254 break-ins costing approximately ¥30,000,000 in damages. He stated that he simply did not wish to work, and that he believed or currently believes that if he was a younger man he could have been a robber professionally. Police in Osaka concluded their investigation on 19 October 2017.
