= Eva Piñera =

Spanish swimmer

Personal information
- Born: 1 July 1974 (age 52) Gijón, Asturias, Spain

Sport
- Sport: Swimming
- Strokes: Backstroke

Eva Piñera Piñera (born 1 July 1974) is a former backstroke swimmer from Spain, who competed at the 1996 Summer Olympics in Atlanta for her native country where she finished in 20th place in the 100 m Backstroke, and in 15th position with the Women's Team in the 4x100 m Medley Relay.
