= Antonio González (field hockey) =

Spanish field hockey player (born 1969)

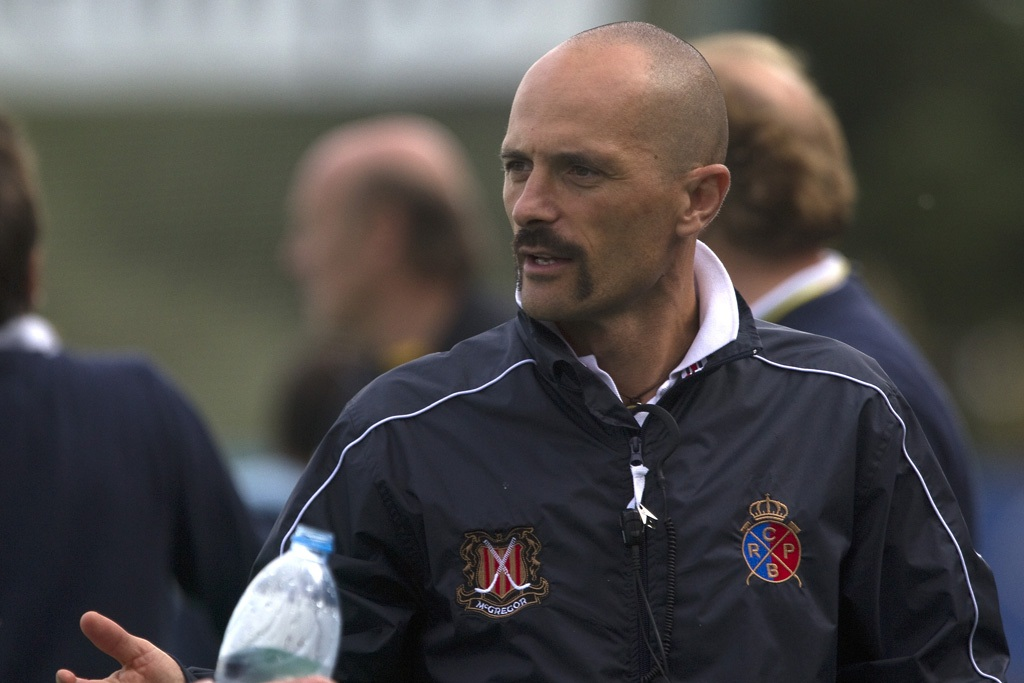
- González in 2012

Personal information
- Full name: Antonio González Izquierdo
- Born: 13 October 1969 (age 56) Santander, Cantabria, Spain
Medal record
Men's field hockey
Representing Spain
Olympic Games
Silver medal – second place	1996 Atlanta	Team competition

Antonio González Izquierdo (born 13 October 1969) is a former field hockey goalkeeper from Spain, who won the silver medal with the men's national team at the 1996 Summer Olympics in Atlanta, Georgia. He also participated in the 1992 Summer Olympics in Barcelona.
