= Jesús Olalla =

Spanish handball player (born 1971)

Olympic medal record

Men's Handball
Bronze medal – third place	1996 Atlanta	Team
Bronze medal – third place	2000 Sydney	Team

Jesús "Josu" Olalla Iraeta (born July 15, 1971) is a Spanish handball player who competed in the 1996 Summer Olympics and in the 2000 Summer Olympics.

He was born in Irun.

In 1996 he won the bronze medal with the Spanish team. He played all seven matches and scored 14 goals.

Four years later he won his second bronze medal with the Spanish handball team in the 2000 Olympic tournament. He played one match.
