= Salvador Esquer =

Spanish handball player (born 1969)

Personal information
- Full name: José Salvador Esquer Bisbal
- Born: 8 January 1969 (age 57) Algemesí, Spain
- Height: 190 cm (75 in)

Sport
- Sport: Handball
- Position: Pivot

Youth career
- Years: Team
- –1986: Maristas Algemesí

Senior clubs
- Years: Team
- 1986–1988: Maristas Algemesí
- 1988–1989: CB Valencia
- 1989–1995: CB Alzira
- 1995–1996: CB Valencia
- 1996–1997: SD Teucro
- 1997–1999: CB Cantabria Santander
- 1999–2000: Ademar Leon
- 2000–2003: CB Valencia
- 2003–2004: Maristas Algemesí
National team
Years	Team	Apps	(Gls)
1993–1999	Spain	81	(167)
Medal record
Men's Handball
Bronze medal – third place	1996 Atlanta	Team

José Salvador Esquer Bisbal (born 8 January 1969) is a Spanish handball player who competed in the 1996 Summer Olympics.

He was born in Algemesí.

In 1996 he was a member of the Spanish handball team which won the bronze medal. He played all seven matches and scored 21 goals.
