= Óscar Barrena =

Spanish field hockey player (born 1966)

Personal information
- Born: 22 October 1966 (age 59) Kirchheim-Teck, West Germany
Medal record
Men's field hockey
Representing Spain
Olympic Games
Silver medal – second place	1996 Atlanta	Team competition

Óscar Barrena González (born 22 October 1966 in Kirchheim-Teck, West Germany) is a former field hockey player from Spain. He won the silver medal with the men's national team at the 1996 Summer Olympics in Atlanta, Georgia.
