= Silvia Rovira =

Spanish cyclist (born 1967)

Personal information
- Born: 15 December 1967 (age 58) Barcelona, Spain

Cycling career
- Sport: Cycling

Silvia Rovira (born 15 December 1967) is a Spanish cyclist. She competed at the 1996 Summer Olympics and the 2000 Summer Olympics.
