= Baseball at the 1996 Summer Olympics – Team squads =

The following is the list of squads that took place in the baseball tournament at the 1996 Summer Olympics.

== Australia ==
#2 Jeff Williams

#3 Mark Doubleday

#4 Scott Tunkin

#5 Michael Nakamura

#6 Steven Hinton

#7 Richard Vagg

#8 Andrew Scott

#9 Shane Tonkin

#10 Jason Hewitt

#12 Andrew McNally

#13 Matthew Sheldon-Collins

#19 Peter Vogler

#21 David Hynes

#23 Grant McDonald

#26 Scott Dawes

#29 Stuart Howell

#30 Sten Lindberg

#31 Simon Sheldon-Collins

#33 Stuart Thompson

#35 John Moore

== Cuba ==
- Alberto Hernández
- Antonio Pacheco
- Antonio Scull
- Eduardo Paret
- Eliécer Montes
- Jorge Fumero
- José Antonio Estrada
- José Contreras
- Juan Manrique
- Juan Padilla
- Lázaro Vargas
- Luis Ulacia
- Miguel Caldés
- Omar Ajete
- Omar Linares
- Omar Luis
- Orestes Kindelán
- Ormari Romero
- Pedro Luis Lazo
- Rey Isaac

== Japan ==
- Kosuke Fukudome
- Masahiro Nojima
- Nobuhiko Matsunaka
- Makoto Imaoka
- Takao Kuwamoto
- Tadahito Iguchi
- Yasuyuki Saigo
- Hideaki Okubo
- Daishin Nakamura
- Koichi Misawa
- Masao Morinaka
- Jutaro Kimura
- Takeo Kawamura
- Hitoshi Ono
- Masahiko Mori
- Masanori Sugiura
- Takashi Kurosu
- Takayuki Takabayashi
- Tomoaki Sato
- Yoshitomo Tani

== Italy ==
- Claudio Liverziani
- Pierpaolo Illuminati
- Roberto De Franceschi
- Davide Rigoli
- Marco Ubani
- Francesco Casolari
- Andrea Evangelisti
- Enrico Vecchi
- Massimiliano Masin
- Paolo Ceccaroli
- Ruggero Bagialemani
- Paolo Passerini
- Massimo Fochi
- Alberto D'Auria
- Roberto Cabalisti
- Dante Carbini
- Marco Barboni
- Rolando Cretis
- Luigi Carrozza
- Fabio Betto

== Netherlands ==
- Eric de Bruin
- André van Maris
- Eddie Dix
- Geoffrey Kohl
- Marcel Joost
- Eelco Jansen
- Byron Ward
- Johnny Balentina
- Giel ten Bosch
- Jeffrey Cranston
- Danny Wout
- Tom Nanne
- Paul Nanne
- Evert-Jan 't Hoen
- Marlon Fluonia
- Rob Cordemans
- Adonis Kemp
- Marcel Kruijt
- Edsel Martis
- Peter Callenbach

== Nicaragua ==
- Bayardo Dávila
- Martín Alemán
- Norman Cardozo
- Oswaldo Mairena
- Nemesio Porras
- José Luis Quiroz
- Carlos Alberto Berrios
- Sandy Moreno
- Omar Obando
- Ramón Padilla
- Fredy Zamora
- Julio César Osejo
- Eduardo Bojorge
- Asdrudes Flores
- Aníbal Vega
- Erasmo Baca
- Luis Daniel Miranda
- Fredy Corea
- Jorge Luis Avellán
- Henry Roa

== South Korea ==
- Son Min-han
- Kim Su-gwan
- Bae Jae-hyo
- Jo In-seong
- Gang Hyeok
- Jo Jin-ho
- Jin Kab-yong
- Jo Gyeong-hwan
- Lee Dong-uk
- Gang Pil-seon
- Im Seon-dong
- Lee Byeong-gyu
- O Cheol-min
- Jeon Seung-nam
- Kim Yeong-su
- Mun Dong-hwan
- Na Man-ho
- An Hui-bong
- Kim Seon-u
- Chea Jong-guk

== United States ==
- R. A. Dickey
- Warren Morris
- Augie Ojeda
- Mark Kotsay
- Jason Williams
- Chad Allen
- Chad Green
- Kip Harkrider
- Braden Looper
- Travis Lee
- A. J. Hinch
- Jacque Jones
- Brian Loyd
- Troy Glaus
- Seth Greisinger
- Matt LeCroy
- Kris Benson
- Jim Parque
- Jeff Weaver
- Billy Koch
