= Japan at the 1996 Summer Olympics =

- IOC code: JPN
- NOC: Japanese Olympic Committee
- Website: www.joc.or.jp (in Japanese and English)

in Atlanta
- Competitors: 306 (157 men and 149 women) in 27 sports
- Flag bearer: Ryoko Tamura
- Medals Ranked 23rd: Gold 3 Silver 6 Bronze 5 Total 14

Summer Olympics appearances (overview)
- 1912; 1920; 1924; 1928; 1932; 1936; 1948; 1952; 1956; 1960; 1964; 1968; 1972; 1976; 1980; 1984; 1988; 1992; 1996; 2000; 2004; 2008; 2012; 2016; 2020; 2024; 2028

Japan competed at the 1996 Summer Olympics in Atlanta, United States. 306 competitors, 157 men and 149 women, took part in 168 events in 27 sports.

== Medalists ==
Medal	Name	Sport	Event	Date
Gold	Yuko Emoto	Judo	Women's half middleweight	July 23
Gold	Kenzo Nakamura	Judo	Men's lightweight	July 24
Gold	Tadahiro Nomura	Judo	Men's extra lightweight	July 26
Silver	Yoko Tanabe	Judo	Women's half heavyweight	July 21
Silver	Toshihiko Koga	Judo	Men's half middleweight	July 23
Silver	Yukimasa Nakamura	Judo	Men's half lightweight	July 25
Silver	Ryoko Tamura	Judo	Women's extra lightweight	July 26
Silver	Alicia Kinoshita; Yumiko Shige	Sailing	Women's 470	August 1
Silver	Masanori Sugiura; Takayuki Takabayashi; Yoshitomo Tani; Hitoshi Ono; Yasuyuki Saigo; Tomoaki Sato; Daishin Nakamura; Masahiro Nojima; Hideaki Okubo; Koichi Misawa; Masahiko Mori; Masao Morinaka; Takashi Kurosu; Takao Kuwamoto; Nobuhiko Matsunaka; Takeo Kawamura; Jutaro Kimura; Kosuke Fukudome; Tadahito Iguchi; Makoto Imaoka	Baseball	Men's tournament	August 2
Bronze	Takanobu Jumonji	Cycling	Men's 1000 m time trial	July 24
Bronze	Noriko Narazaki	Judo	Women's half lightweight	July 25
Bronze	Yuko Arimori	Athletics	Women's marathon	July 28
Bronze	Takuya Ota	Wrestling	Men's freestyle 74 kg	August 2
Bronze	Junko Tanaka; Miya Tachibana; Kaori Takahashi; Miho Takeda; Miho Kawabe; Akiko Kawase; Riho Nakajima; Raika Fujii; Mayuko Fujiki; Rei Jimbo	Synchronized swimming	Women's competition	August 2

Medals by sport
Sport	1st place, gold medalist(s)	2nd place, silver medalist(s)	3rd place, bronze medalist(s)	Total
Judo	3	4	1	8
Baseball	0	1	0	1
Sailing	0	1	0	1
Athletics	0	0	1	1
Cycling	0	0	1	1
Synchronized swimming	0	0	1	1
Wrestling	0	0	1	1
Total	3	6	5	14

== Archery ==
In the nation's sixth Olympic archery competition, three of Japan's five archers won their first matches. All three lost in the second round, however.

Men

Athlete	Event	Ranking round		Round of 64	Round of 32	Round of 16	Quarterfinals	Semifinals	Final / BM	
Athlete	Event	Score	Seed	Opposition Score	Opposition Score	Opposition Score	Opposition Score	Opposition Score	Opposition Score	Rank
Takayoshi Matsushita	Individual	657	25	Bjerendal (SWE); W 163–162	Hsieh (TPE); L 156–157	Did not advance				
Hiroshi Yamamoto	Individual	665	13	González (MEX); W 155–154	Torres (FRA); L 163–164	Did not advance				

Women

Athlete	Event	Ranking round		Round of 64	Round of 32	Round of 16	Quarterfinals	Semifinals	Final / BM	
Athlete	Event	Score	Seed	Opposition Score	Opposition Score	Opposition Score	Opposition Score	Opposition Score	Opposition Score	Rank
Kinue Kodama	Individual	613	52	Murzayeva (RUS); W 159–147	Galinovskaya (RUS); L 151–155	Did not advance				
Misato Koide	Individual	583	58	Valeeva (MDA); L 141–159	Did not advance					
Ai Ouchi	Individual	631	43	Sjöwall (SWE); L 152–152	Did not advance					
Kinue Kodama; Misato Koide; Ai Ouchi	Team	1827	14	—N/a		China; L 217–222	Did not advance			

== Athletics ==
Men
Track and road events

Athlete	Event	Heats		Quarterfinal		Semifinal		Final	
Athlete	Event	Result	Rank	Result	Rank	Result	Rank	Result	Rank
Nobuharu Asahara	100 metres	10.28	18 Q	10.19	13 Q	10.16	10	Did not advance	
Hiroyasu Tsuchie	100 metres	10.58	65	Did not advance					
Koji Ito	200 metres	20.56	11 Q	20.47	7 Q	20.45	10	Did not advance	
Takahiro Mazuka	200 metres	21.13	59	Did not advance					
Shigekazu Omori	400 metres	46.30	34	Did not advance					
Katsuhiko Hanada	10,000 metres	28:52.22	27	—N/a				Did not advance	
Toshinari Takaoka	10,000 metres	28:38.18	23	—N/a				Did not advance	
Kenjiro Jitsui	Marathon	—N/a						2:33:27	93
Masaki Oya	Marathon	—N/a						2:22:13	54
Hiromi Taniguchi	Marathon	—N/a						2:17:26	19
Shunji Karube	400 metres hurdles	48.96	17	—N/a		Did not advance			
Hideaki Kawamura	400 metres hurdles	49.88	32	—N/a		Did not advance			
Kazuhiko Yamazaki	400 metres hurdles	49.07	19	—N/a		Did not advance			
Hiroyasu Tsuchie; Koji Ito; Satoru Inoue; Nobuharu Asahara	4 × 100 metres relay	DQ		—N/a		Did not advance			
Shunji Karube; Koji Ito; Jun Osakada; Shigekazu Omori; Kenji Tabata*	4 × 400 metres relay	3:02.82	9 Q	—N/a		3:01.92	6 Q	3:00.76	5
Daisuke Ikeshima	20 kilometres walk	—N/a						1:24:54	21
Tadahiro Kosaka	50 kilometres walk	—N/a						4:05:57	29

Field events

Athlete	Event	Qualification		Final	
Athlete	Event	Distance	Position	Distance	Position
Tomohiro Nomura	High jump	2.15	27	Did not advance	
Teruyasu Yonekura	Pole vault	5.20	30	Did not advance	
Nobuharu Asahara	Long jump	7.46	36	Did not advance	

Women
Track and road events

Athlete	Event	Heats		Quarterfinal		Semifinal		Final	
Athlete	Event	Result	Rank	Result	Rank	Result	Rank	Result	Rank
Harumi Hiroyama	5000 metres	15:50.43	27	—N/a				Did not advance	
Yoshiko Ichikawa	5000 metres	15:58.90	34	—N/a				Did not advance	
Michiko Shimizu	5000 metres	15:23.56	12 Q	—N/a				15:09.05	4
Masako Chiba	10,000 metres	31:37.03	4 Q	—N/a				31:20.62	5
Yuko Kawakami	10,000 metres	32:31.69	17 Q	—N/a				31:23.23	7
Hiromi Suzuki	10,000 metres	31:54.89	7 Q	—N/a				32:43.39	16
Yuko Arimori	Marathon	—N/a						2:28:39	3rd place, bronze medalist(s)
Junko Asari	Marathon	—N/a						2:34:31	17
Izumi Maki	Marathon	—N/a						2:32:35	12
Yvonne Kanazawa	100 metres hurdles	13.30	35	Did not advance					
Yuka Mitsumori	10 kilometres walk	—N/a						DQ	

Field events

Athlete	Event	Qualification		Final	
Athlete	Event	Distance	Position	Distance	Position
Akiko Miyajima	Javelin throw	53.98	29	Did not advance	

== Badminton ==
Athlete	Event	Round of 64	Round of 32	Round of 16	Quarterfinals	Semifinals	Final	
Athlete	Event	Opposition Result	Opposition Result	Opposition Result	Opposition Result	Opposition Result	Opposition Result	Rank
Fumihiko Machida	Men's singles	Beeharry (MRI); W 15–11, 15–5	Kittikul (THA); W 15–7, 15–11	Park (KOR); L 5–15, 9–15	Did not advance			
Hisako Mizui	Women's singles	Jean-Pierre (MRI); W 11–2, 11–1	Rybkina (RUS); W 11–1, 11—8	Kim J-h (KOR); L 4–11, 0–11	Did not advance			
Yasuko Mizui	Women's singles	Campbell (AUS); W 11–0, 8–11, 11–7	Wibowo (SUI); W' 11–4, 11–6	Bang (KOR); L 2–11, 3–11	Did not advance			
Aiko Miyamura; Akiko Miyamura	Women's doubles	—N/a	Kim S-y / Kim M-h (KOR); L 12–15, 13–18	Did not advance				
Tomomi Matsuo; Masako Sakamoto	Women's doubles	—N/a	Koleva / Nedyalkova (BUL); W 15–0, 15–4	Gil / Jang (KOR); L 7–15, 6–15	Did not advance			

== Baseball ==
Defending bronze medalist Japan competed for the second time in the Olympic baseball tournament. They got off to a rough start, losing three of their first four games to Australia, Cuba, and the United States. After winning their next three, however, the Japanese were in a tie with the Nicaraguans for third and fourth places. Since Japan had beaten Nicaragua in head-to-head competition, they won the tie-breaker and faced the United States in the semifinals rather than the Cubans, which had not lost any of their 16 games in the 1992 and 1996 Olympiads. Japan defeated the United States to advance to the final, where they became the Cubans' 18th victim (Nicaragua's loss in the semifinals being the 17th win for Cuba).

Summary

Team	Event	Round robin								Semifinal	Final / BM	
Team	Event	Opposition Result	Opposition Result	Opposition Result	Opposition Result	Opposition Result	Opposition Result	Opposition Result	Rank	Opposition Result	Opposition Result	Rank
Japan men	Men's tournament	Netherlands; W 12–2 (F/7)	Cuba; L 7–8	Australia; L 6–9	United States; L 5–15 (F/7)	Nicaragua; W 13–6	South Korea; W 14–4 (F/7)	Italy; W 12–1 (F/8)	3 Q	United States; W 11–2	Cuba; L 9–13	2nd place, silver medalist(s)

Roster

- Kosuke Fukudome
- Masahiro Nojima
- Nobuhiko Matsunaka
- Makoto Imaoka
- Takao Kuwamoto
- Tadahito Iguchi
- Yasuyuki Saigo
- Hideaki Okubo
- Daishin Nakamura
- Koichi Misawa
- Masao Morinaka
- Jutaro Kimura
- Takeo Kawamura
- Hitoshi Ono
- Masahiko Mori
- Masanori Sugiura
- Takashi Kurosu
- Takayuki Takabayashi
- Tomoaki Sato
- Yoshitomo Tani

Round robin

Pos	Team	Pld	W	L	RF	RA	RD	PCT	GB	Qualification
1	Cuba	7	7	0	97	49	+48	1.000	—	Advance to knockout round
2	United States (H)	7	6	1	81	27	+54	.857	1	Advance to knockout round
3	Japan	7	4	3	69	45	+24	.571	3	Advance to knockout round
4	Nicaragua	7	4	3	44	30	+14	.571	3	Advance to knockout round
5	Netherlands	7	2	5	32	76	−44	.286	5	
6	Italy	7	2	5	33	71	−38	.286	5	
7	Australia	7	2	5	47	86	−39	.286	5	
8	South Korea	7	1	6	40	59	−19	.143	6	

(H) Hosts

8:00PM	1	2	3	4	5	6	7	8	9	R	H	E
Japan	1	1	1	0	1	2	6			12	17	0
Netherlands	0	1	0	0	0	0	1			2	6	4

8:00PM	1	2	3	4	5	6	7	8	9	10	R	H	E
Japan	0	1	0	0	1	4	0	0	0	1	7	6	0
Cuba	3	3	0	0	0	0	0	0	0	2	8	12	1

3:00PM	1	2	3	4	5	6	7	8	9	R	H	E
Australia	0	1	0	0	1	7	0	0	0	9	14	0
Japan	2	0	0	0	0	1	0	0	3	6	11	3

8:00PM	1	2	3	4	5	6	7	8	9	R	H	E
Japan	2	0	2	1	0	0	0			5	6	1
United States	7	0	0	0	7	1	X			15	14	0

10:00AM	1	2	3	4	5	6	7	8	9	R	H	E
Japan	6	2	0	0	2	0	0	2	1	13	13	1
Nicaragua	0	2	0	2	0	0	2	0	0	6	11	2

8:00PM	1	2	3	4	5	6	7	8	9	R	H	E
South Korea	1	0	0	0	0	3	0			4	8	2
Japan	0	0	2	3	5	3	1			14	19	0

3:00PM	1	2	3	4	5	6	7	8	9	R	H	E
Italy	0	0	0	1	0	0	0	0		1	6	1
Japan	1	2	0	1	3	2	1	2		12	13	0

Semifinal game

Team	1	2	3	4	5	6	7	8	9	R	H	E
Japan	0	3	0	0	3	0	2	2	1	11	15	0
United States	0	0	0	0	0	2	0	0	0	2	6	1

Gold medal game

Team	1	2	3	4	5	6	7	8	9	R	H	E
Japan	0	0	0	1	5	0	1	0	2	9	9	1
Cuba	3	3	0	0	0	4	1	2	x	13	14	0

== Basketball ==
Summary

Team	Event	Group stage						Quarterfinal	Semifinal	Final / BM	
Team	Event	Opposition Score	Opposition Score	Opposition Score	Opposition Score	Opposition Score	Rank	Opposition Score	Opposition Score	Opposition Score	Rank
Japan women's	Women's tournament	Russia; L 63–73	China; W 75–72	Brazil; L 80–100	Italy; L 52–68	Canada; W 95–85	4 Q	United States; L 93–108	Russia; L 69–80	Italy; W 81–69	7

=== Women's tournament ===
Roster

The following players represented Japan:

- Aki Ichijo
- Chikako Murakami
- Taeko Oyama
- Mikiko Hagiwara
- Kikuko Mikawa
- Kagari Yamada
- Takako Kato
- Yuka Harada
- Akemi Okazato
- Mayumi Kawasaki
- Mutsuko Nagata
- Noriko Hamaguchi

Preliminary round

Pos	Team	Pld	W	L	PF	PA	PD	Pts	Qualification
1	Brazil	5	5	0	424	360	+64	10	Quarterfinals
2	Russia	5	4	1	378	342	+36	9	Quarterfinals
3	Italy	5	3	2	330	309	+21	8	Quarterfinals
4	Japan	5	2	3	365	396	−31	7	Quarterfinals
5	China	5	1	4	347	378	−31	6	
6	Canada	5	0	5	293	352	−59	5	

Source: FIBA archive
Rules for classification: 1) points; 2) head-to-head points; 3) head-to-head goal average; 4) head-to-head number of points scored.

21 July 1996

Boxscore

Japan	63–73	Russia
Pts: Kato 15; Rebs: Kato 9 Asts: Murakami 6		Pts: Baranova 21; Rebs: Baranova 13; Asts: Sumnikova 5

Morehouse College Gymnasium, Atlanta

23 July 1996

Boxscore

China	72–75	Japan
Pts: Zheng H 31; Rebs: Zheng H 16; Asts: Li X 6		Pts: Hagiwara 23; Rebs: Kato 10; Asts: Murakami 4

Morehouse College Gymnasium, Atlanta

25 July 1996

Brazil	100–80	Japan
Pts: Paula 25; Rebs: Leila 14; Asts: Paula 10		Pts: Ichijo 16; Rebs: Nagata, Murakami 5 Asts: Murakami 4

Morehouse College Gymnasium, Atlanta

27 July 1996

Boxscore

Japan	52–66	Italy
Pts: Murakami 13; Rebs: Ichijo 9 Asts: Murakami 5		Pts: Pollini, Arnetoli 13; Rebs: Fullin 11; Asts: Pollini, Ballabio 3

Morehouse College Gymnasium, Atlanta

29 July 1996

Boxscore

Canada	85–95	Japan
Pts: Jerant 15; Rebs: Norman 10; Asts: Evans 4		Pts: Hagiwara 26; Rebs: Murakami, Ichijo 5 Asts: Murakami, Kato 5

Morehouse College Gymnasium, Atlanta

Quarterfinals

31 July 1996
15:00

Boxscore

United States	108–93	Japan
Scoring by half: 59–44, 49–49
Pts: Leslie 35; Rebs: McClain 16; Asts: Edwards 12		Pts: Ichijo, Hagiwara 22; Rebs: Kato 8 Asts: Murakami 10

Georgia Dome, Atlanta

Classification Round 5th−8th place

1 August 1996
15:00

Boxscore

Russia	80–69	Japan
Scoring by half: 39–34, 41–35
Pts: Baranova 37; Rebs: Baranova 13; Asts: Sumnikova 14		Pts: Kato 19; Rebs: Ichijo 12; Asts: Murakami 7

Georgia Dome, Atlanta

7th place game

3 August 1996
15:00

Boxscore

Italy	69–81	Japan
Scoring by half: 32–41, 37–40
Pts: Paparazzo 19; Rebs: Pollini 6 Asts: Caselin 5		Pts: Hagiwara 21; Rebs: Hagiwara, Hamaguchi 9 Asts: Harada 5

Georgia Dome, Atlanta

== Beach volleyball ==
Athlete	Event	First round	Second round	Third round	Fourth round	Elimination					Semifinal	Final / BM	
Athlete	Event	Opposition Result	Opposition Result	Opposition Result	Opposition Result	Opposition Result	Opposition Result	Opposition Result	Opposition Result	Opposition Result	Opposition Result	Opposition Result	Rank
Shoji Setoyama; Kazuyuki Takao	Men's tournament	Ahmann / Hager (GER); L 8–15	Did not advance			Penigaud / Jodard (FRA); L 12–15	Did not advance						
Sachiko Fujita; Yukiko Takahashi	Women's tournament	Bye	Fenwick / Spring (AUS); L 10–15	Did not advance		Bye	Yudhani Rahayu / Kaize (INA); W 15–0	Castro / Richardson (USA); W 15–11	Bühler / Müsch (GER); W 15–4	Rodrigues / Samuel (BRA); L 6–15	Did not advance		
Yuki Ishizaka; Peko Nakano	Women's tournament	Bye	Bühler / Müsch (GER); L 8–15	Did not advance		Bye	Prawerman / Lesage (FRA); W 15–8	Fontana / Hanley (USA); L 6–15	Did not advance				

== Boxing ==
Athlete	Event	Round of 32	Round of 16	Quarterfinals	Semifinals	Final	
Athlete	Event	Opposition Result	Opposition Result	Opposition Result	Opposition Result	Opposition Result	Rank
Kazumasa Tsujimoto	Flyweight	Papyan (ARM); L 5–10	Did not advance				
Fumitaka Nitami	Light welterweight	Zakharov (RUS); L 6–21	Did not advance				
Hirokuni Moto	Middleweight	Chen (CHN); W 15–10	Borowski (POL); L 6–11	Did not advance			

== Canoeing ==
=== Slalom ===
Athlete	Event	Run 1	Rank	Run 2	Rank	Best	Rank
Masanari Mochida	Men's C-1	180.45	19	215.69	22	180.45	22
Tsuyoshi Fujino	Men's K-1	167.26	27	167.94	26	167.26	36
Hiroko Kobayashi	Women's K-1	183.66	7	191.01	14	183.66	17

=== Sprint ===
Athlete	Event	Heats		Repechage		Semifinals		Final	
Athlete	Event	Time	Rank	Time	Rank	Time	Rank	Time	Rank
Sayuri Maruyama	Women's K-1 500 metres	1:58.160	4 R	2:04.829	1 SF	1:54.943	8	Did not advance	
Chieko Akagi; Asako Watanabe	Women's K-2 500 metres	1:52.109	6 R	1:57.944	6	Did not advance			
Sayuri Maruyama; Keiko Muto; Natsuki Nishi; Asako Watanabe	Women's K-4 500 metres	1:49.505	8 SF	—N/a		1:45.996	3	Did not advance	

== Cycling ==
=== Road ===
Athlete	Event	Time	Rank
Kazuyuki Manabe	Men's road race	DNF	
Osamu Sumida	Men's road race	DNF	

=== Track ===
Sprint

Athlete	Event	Qualification		Round 1	Repechage	Round 2	Repechage 2	Round of 16	rRepechage 3	Quarterfinals	Semifinals	Final	
Athlete	Event	Time Speed (km/h)	Rank	Opposition Time Speed (km/h)	Opposition Time Speed (km/h)	Opposition Time Speed (km/h)	Opposition Time Speed (km/h)	Opposition Time Speed (km/h)	Opposition Time Speed (km/h)	Opposition Time Speed (km/h)	Opposition Time Speed (km/h)	Opposition Time Speed (km/h)	Rank
Yuichiro Kamiyama	Men's sprint	10.772	19	Hill (AUS); L	Vasilopoulos (GRE); L	Did not advance							

Time trial

Athlete	Event	Time	Rank
Takanobu Jumonji	Men's time trial	1:03.261	3rd place, bronze medalist(s)

Pursuit

Athlete	Event	Qualification		Quarterfinals	Semifinals	Final	
Athlete	Event	Time	Rank	Opposition Time	Opposition Time	Opposition Time	Rank
Seiko Hashimoto	Women's individual pursuit	3:52.745	12	Did not advance			

Points race

Athlete	Event	Laps	Points	Rank
Masahiro Yasuhara	Men's points race	–1 lap	2	15
Seiko Hashimoto	Women's points race	±0 laps	7	9

=== Mountain biking ===
Athlete	Event	Time	Rank
Kyoshi Miura	Men's cross-country	2:45:03	26
Kanako Tanikawa	Women's cross-country	2:05:44	23

== Diving ==
Athlete	Event	Preliminary		Semifinal		Final	
Athlete	Event	Points	Rank	Points	Rank	Points	Rank
Keita Kaneto	Men's 10 m platform	339.18	19	Did not advance			
Ken Terauchi	Men's 10 m platform	381.51	9 Q	555.90	10 Q	559.89	10
Yuki Motobuchi	Women's 3 m springboard	262.71	11 Q	472.71	11 Q	506.04	6

== Equestrian events ==
=== Eventing ===
Athlete	Horse	Event	Dressage		Cross-country			Jumping		Total	
Athlete	Horse	Event	Penalties	Rank	Penalties	Total	Rank	Penalties	Rank	Penalties	Rank
Shigeyuki Hosono	As du Perche	Individual	59.40	24	DQ			DNF			
Yoshihiko Kowata	Stars de Riols	Individual	71.20	34	DQ			DNF			
Masaru Fuse; Kazuhiro Iwatani; Yoshihiko Kowata; Takeaki Tsuchiya	Talisman de Jarry; Sejane de Vozerier; Hell at Dawn; Right on Time	Team	161.60	7	139.60	309.40	7	16.75	5	326.15	6

=== Jumping ===
Athlete	Horse	Event	Qualification								Final					
Athlete	Horse	Event	Round 1		Round 2		Round 3		Total		Round 1		Round 2		Total	
Athlete	Horse	Event	Score	Rank	Score	Rank	Score	Rank	Score	Rank	Penalties	Rank	Penalties	Rank	Penalties	Rank
Kenji Morimoto	Alcazar	Individual	5.00	37	EL						Did not advance					
Yoshihiro Nakano	Sisal de Jalesnes	Individual	16.50	72	8.00	26	20.00	63	44.50	58	Did not advance					
Takeshi Shirai	Vicomte du Mesnil	Individual	2.00	13	8.25	38	4.50	29	14.75	15 Q	20.25	38	Did not advance			
Taizo Sugitani	Countryman	Individual	16.75	74	16.00	57	16.00	57	48.75	62	Did not advance					
Kenji Morimoto; Yoshihiro Nakano; Takeshi Shirai; Taizo Sugitani	See above	Team	—N/a								32.25	14	40.50	15	72.75	15

== Fencing ==
Four fencers, one man and three women, represented Japan in 1996.

Athlete	Event	Round of 64	Round of 32	Round of 16	Quarterfinals	Semifinals	Final	
Athlete	Event	Opposition Result	Opposition Result	Opposition Result	Opposition Result	Opposition Result	Opposition Result	Rank
Hiroki Ichigatani	Men's foil	Kiełpikowski (POL); L 13–15	Did not advance					
Yuko Arai	Women's épée	García (CUB); L 13—15	Did not advance					
Noriko Kubo	Women's épée	Yan (CHN); L 10–15	Did not advance					
Nanae Tanaka	Women's épée	Aznavourian (RUS); L 5–15	Did not advance					
Yuko Arai; Noriko Kubo; Nanae Tanaka	Women's team épée	—N/a		Russia; L 33–45	—N/a	Classification 9th-11th Place; Switzerland; L 44–45	Did not advance	11

== Football ==
Summary

Key:

- A.E.T – After extra time.
- P – Match decided by penalty-shootout.

Team	Event	Group stage				Quarterfinal	Semifinal	Final / BM	
Team	Event	Opposition Score	Opposition Score	Opposition Score	Rank	Opposition Score	Opposition Score	Opposition Score	Rank
Japan men's	Men's tournament	Brazil; W 1–0	Nigeria; L 0–2	Hungary; W 3–2	3	Did not advance			9
Japan women's	Women's tournament	Germany; L 2–3	Brazil; L 0–2	Norway; L 0–4	4	—N/a	Did not advance		7

=== Men's tournament ===
Team roster

Head coach: Akira Nishino

No.	Pos.	Player	Date of birth (age)	Caps	Club
1	GK	Yoshikatsu Kawaguchi	15 August 1975 (aged 20)		(Japan) Yokohama Marinos
2	DF	Hiroyuki Shirai	17 June 1974 (aged 22)		(Japan) Shimizu S-Pulse
3	DF	Hideto Suzuki	7 October 1974 (aged 21)		(Japan) Júbilo Iwata
4	MF	Yuji Hironaga	25 July 1975 (aged 20)		(Japan) Verdy Kawasaki
5	DF	Makoto Tanaka	8 August 1975 (aged 20)		(Japan) Júbilo Iwata
6	MF	Toshihiro Hattori	23 September 1973 (aged 22)		(Japan) Júbilo Iwata
7	MF	Masakiyo Maezono	29 October 1973 (aged 22)		(Japan) Yokohama Flügels
8	MF	Teruyoshi Ito	31 August 1974 (aged 21)		(Japan) Shimizu S-Pulse
9	FW	Shoji Jo	17 June 1975 (aged 21)		(Japan) JEF United Ichihara
10	MF	Akihiro Endo	18 September 1975 (aged 20)		(Japan) Yokohama Marinos
11	FW	Shigeru Morioka	12 August 1973 (aged 22)		(Japan) Gamba Osaka
12	DF	Kenichi Uemura	22 April 1974 (aged 22)		(Japan) Sanfrecce Hiroshima
13	DF	Naoki Matsuda	14 March 1977 (aged 19)		(Japan) Yokohama Marinos
14	MF	Hidetoshi Nakata	22 January 1977 (aged 19)		(Japan) Bellmare Hiratsuka
15	MF	Tadahiro Akiba	13 October 1975 (aged 20)		(Japan) JEF United Ichihara
16	FW	Yoshika Matsubara	19 August 1974 (aged 21)		(Japan) Shimizu S-Pulse
17	MF	Ryuji Michiki	25 August 1973 (aged 22)		(Japan) Sanfrecce Hiroshima
18	GK	Takashi Shimoda	28 November 1975 (aged 20)		(Japan) Sanfrecce Hiroshima

Group play

Team	Pld	W	D	L	GF	GA	GD	Pts
Brazil	3	2	0	1	4	2	+2	6
Nigeria	3	2	0	1	3	1	+2	6
Japan	3	2	0	1	4	4	0	6
Hungary	3	0	0	3	3	7	−4	0

Source: FIFA
21 July 1996
18:30

Japan	1–0	Brazil
Itō 72'	Report

Orange Bowl, Miami, Florida
Attendance: 46,713
Referee: Archundia (MEX)
23 July 1996
20:30

Nigeria	2–0	Japan
Akiba 83' (o.g.); Okocha 90' (pen.)	Report

Citrus Bowl, Orlando, Florida
Attendance: 22,734
Referee: Collina (ITA)
25 July 1996
21:00

Japan	3–2	Hungary
Maezono 39' (pen.), 90+1'; Uemura 90'	Report	Sandor 2'; Madar 48'

Citrus Bowl, Orlando, Florida
Attendance: 20,834
Referee: Bouchardeau (NIG)

=== Women's tournament ===
Team roster

Head coach: Tamotsu Suzuki

Japan named a squad of 16 players and 4 alternates for the tournament.

No.	Pos.	Player	Date of birth (age)	Caps	Goals	Club
1	GK	Junko Ozawa	7 December 1973 (aged 22)			(Japan Football Association) Fujita SC Mercury
2	DF	Yumi Tomei	1 June 1972 (aged 24)			(Japan Football Association) Prima Ham FC Ku-No-Ichi
3	DF	Rie Yamaki	2 October 1975 (aged 20)			(Japan Football Association) Nikko Securities Dream Ladies
4	DF	Maki Haneta	30 September 1972 (aged 23)			(Japan Football Association) Matsushita Panasonic Bambina
5	DF	Yumi Obe	15 February 1975 (aged 21)			(Japan Football Association) Nikko Securities Dream Ladies
6	DF	Kae Nishina	7 December 1972 (aged 23)			(Japan Football Association) Prima Ham FC Ku-No-Ichi
7	MF	Homare Sawa	6 September 1978 (aged 17)			(Japan Football Association) Yomiuri-Seiyu Beleza
8	MF	Asako Takakura	19 April 1968 (aged 28)			(Japan Football Association) Yomiuri-Seiyu Beleza
9	MF	Futaba Kioka	22 November 1965 (aged 30)			(Japan Football Association) Suzuyo Shimizu F.C. Lovely Ladies
10	FW	Akemi Noda (captain)	13 October 1969 (aged 26)			(Japan Football Association) Takarazuka Bunnys Ladies SC
11	MF	Etsuko Handa	10 May 1965 (aged 31)			(Japan Football Association) Suzuyo Shimizu F.C. Lovely Ladies
12	FW	Tamaki Uchiyama	13 December 1972 (aged 23)			(Japan Football Association) Prima Ham FC Ku-No-Ichi
13	MF	Nami Otake	30 July 1974 (aged 21)			(Japan Football Association) Yomiuri-Seiyu Beleza
14	MF	Kaoru Kadohara	25 May 1970 (aged 26)			(Japan Football Association) Matsushita Panasonic Bambina
15	FW	Miyuki Izumi	31 March 1973 (aged 23)			(Japan Football Association) Suzuyo Shimizu F.C. Lovely Ladies
16	GK	Shiho Onodera	18 November 1973 (aged 22)			(Japan Football Association) Yomiuri-Seiyu Beleza

Unenrolled alternate players
No.	Pos.	Player	Date of birth (age)	Caps	Goals	Club
17	DF	Rie Kimura	30 July 1971 (aged 24)			(Japan Football Association) Matsushita Electric Panasonic Bambina
18	FW	Kaori Nagamine	3 June 1968 (aged 28)			(Japan Football Association) Suzuyo Shimizu F.C. Lovely Ladies
19	GK	Megumi Sakata	18 October 1971 (aged 24)			
20	DF	Ryoko Uno	9 November 1975 (aged 20)			(Japan Football Association) Yomiuri-Seiyu Beleza

Group play

Pos	Team	Pld	W	D	L	GF	GA	GD	Pts	Qualification
1	Norway	3	2	1	0	9	4	+5	7	Semi-finals
2	Brazil	3	1	2	0	5	3	+2	5	Semi-finals
3	Germany	3	1	1	1	6	6	0	4	
4	Japan	3	0	0	3	2	9	−7	0	

Source: FIFA
Rules for classification: Tiebreakers
21 July 1996
13:30

Germany	3–2	Japan
Wiegmann 5'; Tomei 29' (o.g.); Mohr 52'	Report (FIFA)	Kioka 18'; Noda 33'

Legion Field, Birmingham, Alabama
Attendance: 44,211
Referee: Sonia Denoncourt (Canada)
23 July 1996
16:30

Brazil	2–0	Japan
Kátia 68'; Pretinha 78'	Report (FIFA)

Legion Field, Birmingham, Alabama
Attendance: 26,111
Referee: Ingrid Jonsson (Sweden)
25 July 1996
18:30

Norway	4–0	Japan
Pettersen 25', 86'; Medalen 60'; Tangeraas 74'	Report (FIFA)

Robert F. Kennedy Stadium, Washington, D.C.
Attendance: 30,237
Referee: Omar Al-Mehanna (Saudi Arabia)

== Gymnastics ==
=== Artistic ===
==== Men ====
Team

Athlete	Event	Qualification							
Athlete	Event	Apparatus						Total	Rank
Athlete	Event	F	PH	R	V	PB	HB	Total	Rank
Yoshiaki Hatakeda	Team	18.912	19.362	18.300	18.825	19.150	18.625	113.174	25 Q
Shigeru Kurihara	Team	18.900	17.725	19.112	18.775	18.400	17.600	110.512	44
Toshiharu Sato	Team	18.675	18.950	18.625	19.112	18.850	18.575	112.787	29
Hikaru Tanaka	Team	18.850	18.987	18.650	19.000	19.050	19.112	113.649	18 Q
Naoya Tsukahara	Team	19.225	18.962	18.762	19.174	19.037	18.987	114.147	14 Q
Takashi Uchiyama	Team	18.775	17.575	18.450	18.175	18.325	18.300	109.600	54
Total	Team	94.737	94.211	93.674	94.886	94.687	93.824	566.019	10

Individual finals

Athlete	Event	Apparatus						Total	Rank
Athlete	Event	F	PH	R	V	PB	HB	Total	Rank
Yoshiaki Hatakeda	All-around	9.425	9.637	9.487	9.350	9.612	9.700	57.211	15
Yoshiaki Hatakeda	Pommel horse	—N/a	9.712	—N/a				9.712	5
Hikaru Tanaka	All-around	9.562	9.450	9.637	9.425	9.550	9.375	56.999	19
Naoya Tsukahara	All-around	9.612	9.612	9.650	9.512	9.625	9.550	57.561	12

==== Women ====
Team

Athlete	Event	Qualification					
Athlete	Event	Apparatus				Total	Rank
Athlete	Event	V	UB	BB	F	Total	Rank
Miho Hashiguchi	Team	18.574	18.199	17.475	18.875	73.123	60
Naho Hoshiyama	Team	18.175	18.312	18.249	18.574	73.310	57
Hanako Miura	Team	18.862	16.987	17.512	18.724	72.085	68
Satsuki Obata	Team	—N/a	18.062	18.324	—N/a	36.386	101
Masumi Okawa	Team	18.312	8.425	—N/a	18.350	45.087	94
Aya Sekine	Team	18.262	8.762	17.437	18.249	62.710	79
Risa Sugawara	Team	18.737	18.987	18.162	18.874	74.760	41 q
Total	Team	92.797	90.834	89.972	93.459	367.062	12

Individual finals

Athlete	Event	Apparatus				Total	Rank
Athlete	Event	V	UB	BB	F	Total	Rank
Risa Sugawara	All-around	9.412	9.475	8.950	9.562	37.399	29

=== Rhythmic ===
Individual all-around

Athlete	Event	Qualification						Semifinal						Final					
Athlete	Event	Hoop	Ball	Clubs	Ribbon	Total	Rank	Hoop	Ball	Clubs	Ribbon	Total	Rank	Hoop	Ball	Clubs	Ribbon	Total	Rank
Miho Yamada	Individual	9.350	9.350	9.249	9.182	37.131	18 Q	9.316	9.133	9.200	8.616	36.265	20	Did not advance					
Akane Yamao	Individual	9.183	9.366	9.283	9.283	37.115	19 Q	9.233	8.966	9.216	9.383	36.798	18	Did not advance					

== Softball ==
=== Women's team competition ===
- Preliminary Round Robin

- Defeated Netherlands (3:0)
- Defeated PR China (3:0)
- Lost to United States (1:6)
- Defeated Canada (4:0)
- Lost to Australia (0:10)
- Defeated Puerto Rico (8:1)
- Defeated Chinese Taipei (5:1)

- Semifinals

- Lost to Australia (0:3)

- Bronze Medal Match

- Did not advance → 4th place

- Team roster

- Juri Takayama
- Noriko Yamaji
- Haruka Saito
- Misako Ando
- Naomi Matsumoto
- Yoshiko Fujimoto
- Ikuko Fukita
- Noriko Harada
- Mayumi Inoue
- Chika Kodama
- Kyoko Kobayashi
- Kyoko Mochida
- Emi Tsukada
- Masako Watanabe
- Tomoko Watanabe

- Head coach: Mitsutoshi Suzumura

== Swimming ==
Men's 50 metres Freestyle:

- Yukihiro Matsushita

- Heat — 23.60 (→ did not advance, 35th place)

Men's 100 metres Freestyle:

- Shunsuke Ito

- Heat — 51.29 (→ did not advance, 37th place)

Men's 200 metres Freestyle:

- Shunsuke Ito

- Heat — 1:51.97 (→ did not advance, 23rd place)

Men's 400 metres Freestyle:

- Hisato Yasui

- Heat — 4:00.19 (→ did not advance, 24th place)

Men's 1500 m Freestyle

- Masato Hirano

- Heat — 15:19.48
- B-Final — 15:17.28 (→ 6th place)

- Hisato Yasui

- Heat — 15:43.66 (→ did not advance, 22nd place)

Men's 100 m Backstroke

- Keitaro Konnai

- Heat — 56.35
- B-Final — 55.74 (→ 9th place)

- Hajime Itoi

- Heat — 56.22
- B-Final — 56.23 (→ 11th place)

Men's 200 m Backstroke

- Hajime Itoi

- Heat — 2:00.43
- Final — 2:00.10 (→ 5th place)

- Ryuji Horii

- Heat — 2:02.33
- B-Final — 2:01.54 (→ 9th place)

Men's 100 m Breaststroke

- Akira Hayashi

- Heat — 1:02.63
- B-Final — 1:02.75 (→ 12th place)

- Yoshinobu Miyazaki

- Heat — 1:03.13 (→ did not advance, 22nd place)

Men's 200 m Breaststroke

- Akira Hayashi

- Heat — 2:15.37
- B-Final — 2:16.69 (→ 16th place)

Men's 100 m Butterfly

- Takashi Yamamoto

- Heat — 53.95
- B-Final — 53.98 (→ 13th place)

- Yukihiro Matsushita

- Heat — 54.50 (→ did not advance, 20th place)

Men's 200 m Butterfly

- Takashi Yamamoto

- Heat — 2:00.87 (→ did not advance, 20th place)

Men's 200 m Individual Medley

- Tatsuya Kinugasa

- Heat — 2:03.42
- B-Final — 2:04.59 (→ 14th place)

- Jo Yoshimi

- Heat — 2:04.49
- B-Final — 2:05.42 (→ 16th place)

Men's 400 m Individual Medley

- Toshiaki Kurasawa

- Heat — 4:24.83
- B-Final — 4:23.36 (→ 10th place)

- Tatsuya Kinugasa

- Heat — 4:26.73
- B-Final — 4:24.25 (→ 11th place)

Men's 4 × 100 m Medley Relay

- Keitaro Konnai, Akira Hayashi, Takashi Yamamoto and Shunsuke Ito

- Heat — 3:41.78
- Final — 3:40.51 (→ 5th place)

Women's 50 m Freestyle

- Sumika Minamoto

- Heat — 25.89
- B-Final — 26.05 (→ 12th place)

Women's 100 m Freestyle

- Sumika Minamoto

- Heat — 57.25 (→ did not advance, 25th place)

Women's 200 m Freestyle

- Suzu Chiba

- Heat — 2:01.11
- B-Final — 2:01.00 (→ 10th place)

- Naoko Imoto

- Heat — 2:03.78 (→ did not advance, 20th place)

Women's 400 m Freestyle

- Eri Yamanoi

- Heat — 4:13.40
- Final — 4:11.68 (→ 7th place)

- Suzu Chiba

- Heat — 4:16.07
- B-Final — 4:16.60 (→ 13th place)

Women's 800 m Freestyle

- Eri Yamanoi

- Heat — 8:40.47 (→ did not advance, 10th place)

- Aiko Miyake

- Heat — 8:55.77 (→ did not advance, 21st place)

Women's 100 m Backstroke

- Mai Nakamura

- Heat — 1:02.35
- Final — 1:02.33 (→ 4th place)

- Miki Nakao

- Heat — 1:02.90
- Final — 1:02.78 (→ 8th place)

Women's 200 m Backstroke

- Mai Nakamura

- Heat — 2:15.05
- B-Final — 2:13.40 (→ 9th place)

- Miki Nakao

- Heat — 2:12.92
- Final — 2:13.57 (→ 5th place)

Women's 100 m Breaststroke

- Masami Tanaka

- Heat — 1:09.89
- B-Final — 1:10.43 (→ 13th place)

- Kyoko Iwasaki

- Heat — 1:11.33 (→ did not advance, 22nd place)

Women's 200 m Breaststroke

- Masami Tanaka

- Heat — 2:29.36
- Final — 2:28.05 (→ 5th place)

- Kyoko Iwasaki

- Heat — 2:30.84
- B-Final — 2:29.32 (→ 10th place)

Women's 100 m Butterfly

- Hitomi Kashima

- Heat — 1:00.85
- Final — 1:00.11 (→ 4th place)

- Ayari Aoyama

- Heat — 1:00.20
- Final — 1:00.18 (→ 6th place)

Women's 200 m Butterfly

- Hitomi Kashima

- Heat — 2:16.04
- B-Final — 2:13.97 (→ 14th place)

- Mika Haruna

- Heat — 2:12.59
- Final — 2:11.93 (→ 7th place)

Women's 200 m Individual Medley

- Fumie Kurotori

- Heat — 2:20.58 (→ did not advance, 28th place)

Women's 400 m Individual Medley

- Fumie Kurotori

- Heat — 4:48.51
- B-Final — 4:47.98 (→ 12th place)

- Hideko Hiranaka

- Heat — 4:49.32
- B-Final — 4:48.72 (→ 13th place)

Women's 4 × 100 m Freestyle Relay

- Sumika Minamoto, Naoko Imoto, Eri Yamanoi and Suzu Chiba

- Heat — 3:48.77 (→ did not advance, 12th place)

Women's 4 × 200 m Freestyle Relay

- Eri Yamanoi, Naoko Imoto, Aiko Miyake and Suzu Chiba

- Heat — 8:09.46
- Final — 8:07.46 (→ 4th place)

Women's 4 × 100 m Medley Relay

- Mai Nakamura, Masami Tanaka, Ayari Aoyama and Suzu Chiba

- Heat — 4:10.71 (→ did not advance, 9th place)

== Tennis ==
Men's Singles Competition

- Shuzo Matsuoka

- First round — Lost to Tim Henman (Great Britain) 6-7 3-6

Men's Doubles Competition

- Satoshi Iwabuchi and Takao Suzuki

- First round — Defeated Juan-Carlos Bianchi and Nicolas Pereira (Venezuela) 6-4, 6-7, 8-6
- Second round — Lost to Sergi Bruguera and Tomás Carbonell (Spain) 7-6, 2-6, 5-7

Women's Singles Competition

- Ai Sugiyama

- First round — Defeated Katarina Studenikova (Slovakia) 6-2 6-3
- Second round — Defeated Martina Hingis (Switzerland) 6-4 6-4
- Third round — Lost to Jana Novotná (Czech Republic) 3-6 4-6

- Kimiko Date

- First round — Defeated Dally Randriantefy (Madagascar) 6-0 6-1
- Second round — Defeated Virag Csurgo (Hungary) 6-2 6-3
- Third round — Defeated Magdalena Maleeva (Bulgaria) 6-4 6-4
- Quarter Finals — Lost to Arantxa Sánchez Vicario (Spain) 6-4 3-6 8-10

- Naoko Sawamatsu

- First round — Defeated Sung-Hee Park (South Korea) 6-3 4-6 6-3
- Second round — Lost to Lindsay Davenport (United States) 2-6 2-6

== Volleyball ==
=== Women's Indoor Team Competition ===
- Preliminary round (group A)

- Lost to South Korea (0-3)
- Defeated Ukraine (3-0)
- Lost to Netherlands (0-3)
- Lost to United States (0-3)
- Lost to China (0-3)

- Quarterfinals

- did not advance (→ Ninth place)

- Team roster

- Kaiyo Hoshini
- Aki Nagatomi
- Kazumi Nakamura
- Chieko Nakanishi
- Motoko Ohbayashi
- Ikumi Ogake
- Mika Saiki
- Kiyomi Sakamoto
- Asako Tajimi
- Chiho Torii
- Mika Yamauchi
- Tomoko Yoshihara

- Head coach: Kuniaki Yoshida

== Notes ==
- Watkins, Ginger T., ed. (1997). The Official Report of the Centennial Olympic Games, Volume III The Competition Results (PDF). Atlanta: Peachtree Publishers. ISBN 1-56145-150-9. Archived from the original (PDF) on 2007-09-27.
