= Grant McDonald (baseball) =

Australian baseball player (born 1973)

- Outfielder
- Born: 23 September 1973 (age 52); Brisbane, Queensland, Australia
- Bats: Right Throws: Right
Medals
Men's baseball
Representing Australia
Intercontinental Cup
Gold medal – first place	1999 Sydney	Team

Grant Alexander Wesley McDonald (born 23 September 1973) is an Australian baseball player. He competed at the 1996 and 2000 Summer Olympics.

== Australian Baseball League ==
McDonald first played for the Brisbane Bandits of the ABL as an 18-year-old in 1991; he took two years to establish himself. McDonald became the starting centerfielder and was part of the 1993/94 Brisbane Bandits championship team winning its first ABL title.

Over the next five seasons playing for the Brisbane Bandits his batting average increased each year .269, .286, .326, .354 to 1998's mark of .359 his best year with 18 home runs and 49 RBIs. In 1999, with the Brisbane Bandits folding, he was picked up by the Gold Coast Cougars where he won his second ABL championship.

In 2000, McDonald was back in action in the inaugural IBLA season with the Queensland Rams and performed well batting .327.

Grant was selected to four 1st team ABL All Star teams in 1996, 1997, 1998 and 2000. He also holds the joint ABL record of 6 hits in a game against the Hunter Eagles at the Maitland Showground On 17 January 1996.

McDonald played in 339 ABL/IBLA games from 1991–2000 with a career .313 batting average and 190 RBIs. In 2008 he was named to the 75th Anniversary Queensland Baseball All-Star Diamond Team as centerfielder. The team was selected from players that played Claxton Shield for Queensland from 1934–2008.

McDonald was inducted in 2009 into the Queensland Baseball Hall off Fame.

== Australian national team ==
In 1994, McDonald was first selected as a centerfielder of the Australian national baseball team at the 1994 Baseball World Cup in Nicaragua. McDonald continued to represent Australia in baseball at the 1996 Olympics (USA), 1997 Intercontinental Cup, 1998 Baseball World Cup, 1999 Intercontinental Cup and 2000 Olympics (Australia). The Australian 1999 Intercontinental Cup team won Australia's first ever gold medal in international baseball competition defeating Cuba in the final 4–3.

McDonald whilst playing for Australia won the MVP (Most Valuable Player) of the 1998 Haarlem Baseball Week tournament batting .500 and 9 RBIs in the Netherlands.

=== Olympics ===
McDonald was selected and played centerfield for the Australian baseball team at the 1996 Summer Olympics in Atlanta. The team finished 7th in Olympic competition. McDonald batted .292 for the tournament and he hit Australia's first ever home run in Olympic competition, against Cuba starting pitcher Eliecer Montes de Oca in Australia's first game on 20 July 1996 in the second inning.

McDonald again played centerfield for the Australian Olympic baseball team in the 2000 Summer Olympics in Sydney batting .304 with 1 HR. McDonald along with Michael Nakamura were the only two baseball players from the 1996 Australian Olympic team who played on the 2000 Australian Olympic team.

With McDonald's home run at the Sydney Olympics he was the first Australian to hit home runs in consecutive Olympic Games in 1996 and 2000.

== Independent baseball ==
In 2000, Grant played independent professional baseball with the Cook County Cheetahs in the Frontier League in the USA. McDonald played centerfield and batted .301 in 45 games.
