= Tomoaki Sato =

Tomoaki Sato may refer to:

- Tomoaki Sato (baseball, born 1968) (佐藤 友昭), Japanese baseball player
- Tomoaki Satoh (baseball, born 1978) (佐藤 友亮), Japanese baseball player
