= Imaoka =

Imaoka (written 今岡) is a Japanese surname. Notable people with the surname include:

- Makoto Imaoka (今岡 誠, born 1974), Japanese basketball player
- Shinji Imaoka (今岡 信治, born 1965), Japanese film director, screenwriter and actor
