= Miguel Caldés Luis =

Cuban baseball player (1970–2000)

Medal record

Representing Cuba

Men's baseball

Summer Olympics
Gold medal – first place	1996 Atlanta	Team
Silver medal – second place	2000 Sydney	Team

Intercontinental Cup
Gold medal – first place	1993 Italy	Team
Silver medal – second place	1997 Barcelona	Team

Miguel Caldés Luis (September 27, 1970 - December 4, 2000) was a Cuban baseball player and Olympic gold and silver medalist.

Caldés was a one time gold medalist for baseball, winning at the 1996 Summer Olympics.

He also won a silver medal at the 2000 Summer Olympics for baseball.

He died on December 4, 2000, in Saratoga, Camagüey, Cuba.
