= Takeo Kawamura =

Takeo Kawamura may refer to:

- Takeo Kawamura (politician)
- Takeo Kawamura (baseball)
