= Tsukada =

Tsukada may refer to

- Tsukada (surname)
- Tsukada davidiifolia - An Eocene plant genus with one species
- 8156 Tsukada, a minor planet
- Tsukada Station, a railway station in Funabashi, Chiba Prefecture, Japan
