= Juan Manrique =

Cuban baseball player and coach

Cocodrilos de Matanzas – No. 45
- Outfielder / Coach
- Born: 26 August 1967 (age 58); Colón, Matanzas, Cuba
- Bats: Right Throws: Right

Teams
- Matanzas (1987–2004)
Medals
Men's baseball
Representing Cuba
Olympic Games
Gold medal – first place	1996 Atlanta	Team
Silver medal – second place	2000 Sydney	Team
Baseball World Cup
Gold medal – first place	1994 Nicaragua	Team
Gold medal – first place	1998 Italy	Team
Intercontinental Cup
Gold medal – first place	1993 Italy	Team
Gold medal – first place	1995 Havana	Team
Silver medal – second place	1997 Barcelona	Team
Pan American Games
Gold medal – first place	1995 Mar del Plata	Team
Gold medal – first place	1999 Winnipeg	Team
Central American and Caribbean Games
Gold medal – first place	1998 Maracaibo	Team

Juan Manrique García (born 26 August 1967) is a Cuban former baseball player and Olympic gold and silver medalist. García currently serves as a coach for the Cocodrilos de Matanzas of the Cuban National Series.

== Career ==
Manrique was born in Colón, Matanzas Province, Cuba on 26 August 1967. He started playing baseball when he was a schoolboy in a small field in his hometown. He made his Cuban National Series debut in 1986 for Matanzas, where he would play his entire career.

Manrique is a one time Gold medalist for baseball, winning at the 1996 Summer Olympics. He also won a Silver medal at the 2000 Summer Olympics for baseball.

Manrique also played for the Cuba national team in the 1999 Baltimore Orioles–Cuba national baseball team exhibition series.
