= Rey Isaac =

Cuban baseball player (born 1973)

- Outfielder
- Born: 3 January 1973 (age 53); Santiago de Cuba, Santiago de Cuba, Cuba
- Bats: Right Throws: Right

Teams
- Santiago de Cuba (1991–2005)
Medals
Men's baseball
Representing Cuba
Summer Olympics
Gold medal – first place	1996 Atlanta	Team
Intercontinental Cup
Gold medal – first place	1995 Havana	Team
Silver medal – second place	1997 Barcelona	Team

Rey Isaac Vaillant (born 3 January 3 1973) is a Cuban former baseball player and Olympic gold medalist.

== Career ==
Isaac played 16 seasons in the Cuban National Series, all with Santiago de Cuba, where he was part of the so called "Aplanadora Santiaguera" (The Santiago Steamroller). He retired after the 2004–2005 season.

Isaac held the Cuban National Series record for the most consecutive games with a hit, at 37 games, from 1994 until 2020, when the record was broken by César Prieto of Cienfuegos on 21 November 2020.

Cuban National Series career statistics
Seasons	AB	R	H	2B	3B	HR	RBI	BA	OBP	SLG
16	4529	793	1433	211	28	101	685	.316	.396	.442

After retiring, Isaac worked as a coach for Santiago de Cuba.

== International career ==
Isaac is a one time gold medalist for baseball, winning at the 1996 Summer Olympics. He appeared in four games in the Olympic tournament, recording four hits, nine runs, one double, one home run, four RBIs and a .643/.667/.929 batting line.
