= Adonis Kemp =

Dutch baseball player (born 1967)

- Outfielder / Coach
- Born: January 31, 1967 (age 59); San Nicolaas, Aruba
Medals
Men's baseball
Representing Netherlands
European Championship
Gold medal – first place	1993 Stockholm	Team
Gold medal – first place	1995 Haarlem	Team
Silver medal – second place	1997 Paris	Team

Wilhelm Rudolph Adonis Kemp (born 31 January 1967) is a Dutch former baseball player and coach who played for the Netherlands at the 1996 Summer Olympics and other international tournaments. He played and later managed in the Honkbal Hoofdklasse.

== Playing career ==
Kemp played for the Dutch national team from 1993 to 2000. At the 1996 Olympics, he batted .263 over seven games, hitting a home run off Fred Lindberg in a mercy-rule win over Australia. He hit a single off R. A. Dickey in a blowout loss to the United States.

He also played in the 1994 Baseball World Cup, two Haarlem Baseball Weeks, two World Port Tournaments, and the 1993, 1995, and 1997 European Baseball Championships. He played for the Aruba national team, nicknamed Red Machine, in the 1993 World Port Tournament.

Kemp played in the Hoofdklasse in 1987 and from 1989 to 2002, playing for Sparta until 1990, then ADO from 1991 to 1994. He joined Neptunus in 1995, then returned to ADO in 2000. He led the league in home runs in 1994, and his team won the national championship in 1992, 1995, and 1999. He was the most valuable player of the Holland Series in 1995. He hit three home runs in the 2001 European Cup.

== Coaching career ==
After his playing career, Kemp began coaching. He managed the second team of Neptunus in 2005, then won a league title in 2006. He then became the manager of Sparta (then called Sparta-Feyenoord), finishing in seventh place in 2007. He was a coach for Neptunus from 2008 to 2012. Kemp was suspended for two games for remarks he made in a 2011 game against Kinheim. He was supposed to serve the suspension in 2012 but improperly coached the team during a game against Sparta-Feyenoord. After Neptunus reported the error, the 20–0 win over the fellow Rotterdam club was voided.

In 2018, he was one of the coaches of a PONY League youth team that won a European championship.

In 2021, Kemp was the third base coach for Twins Oosterhout in the Hoofdklasse. He managed the team in 2022.

== Personal life ==
Kemp's wife played softball. They have three children, including Dwayne Kemp and Tyriq Kemp, all of whom also play baseball. Both Dwayne and Tyriq have played in Minor League Baseball in the United States. Dwayne has played for the Dutch national team, and Tyriq played college baseball for the Baylor Bears.

In 2016, Kemp was added to an athletics "wall of fame" at Joe Laveist Sport Park in San Nicolaas, Aruba.
