= Tsukada (surname) =

Tsukada is a Japanese surname. Notable people with the surname include:

- Emi Tsukada (born 1972), Japanese Olympic softball player
- Ichiro Tsukada (born 1963), Japanese politician
- Kimiko Tsukada (born 1937), Japanese Olympic gymnast
- Maki Tsukada (born 1982), Japanese judoka
- Masaaki Tsukada (1938–2014), Japanese voice actor
- Masao Tsukada (塚田 正夫, 1914–1977), Japanese shogi player
- Rikichi Tsukada (1892–1958), Lieutenant General of the Imperial Japanese Army
- Yasuaki Tsukada (塚田 泰明, born 1964), Japanese shogi player
- Yoshinobu Tsukada (born 1969), Japanese golfer
- Yosuke Tsukada (born 1985), Japanese golfer
- Yuji Tsukada (born 1957), Japanese footballer and manager
- Yutaro Tsukada (born 2001), Japanese footballer
