= Marlon Fluonia =

Dutch baseball player (born 1964)

- Catcher
- Born: September 26, 1964 (age 62); Willemstad, Curaçao
- Bats: Right Throws: Right
Medals
Men's baseball
Representing Netherlands
European Baseball Championship
Silver medal – second place	1989 Paris	National team
Gold medal – first place	1991 Nettuno	National team
Gold medal – first place	1995 Stockholm	National team

Marlon Supriano Fluonia (born 26 September 1964 in Willemstad, Curaçao) is a Dutch former baseball player and coach who represented the Netherlands at the 1996 Summer Olympics. He batted 0-for-7 in the Olympics, starting two games at catcher.

Fluonia also played for the Netherlands at the 1989, 1991, and 1993 European Baseball Championship, with the Dutch winning the latter two tournaments. He batted only .167 in the 1993 championship. He also played in the 1990 Baseball World Cup and three Haarlem Baseball Week and World Port Tournaments for the Netherlands.

Fluonia also played in the Honkbal Hoofdklasse, the top Dutch league, from 1988 to 2005. He played in the 755 Hoofdklasse games, third-most all time, as of 2018. He played for Neptunus, Sparta-Feyenoord, Quick Amersfoort, PSV and BSC Almere. Before playing in the Netherlands, he played for Royal Scorpions in the Curaçaoan AA League for six seasons.

In 2007, Fluonia became the manager of RCH-Pinguins. He lasted less than one season as manager. He became an assistant coach at UVV Utrecht following the 2018 season. UVV won a playoff to return to the Hoofdklasse in 2022. He stopped being the team's first base coach after the 2024 season.
