= Omar Luis =

Cuban baseball player

- Pitcher
- Born: July 15, 1972 (age 54); Florida, Cuba
Medals
Representing Cuba
Men's baseball
Summer Olympics
Gold medal – first place	1996 Atlanta	Team
Baseball World Cup
Gold medal – first place	1998 Rome	Team
Intercontinental Cup
Gold medal – first place	1995 Havana	Team
Central American and Caribbean Games
Gold medal – first place	1998 Maracaibo	Team

Omar Luis Martínez (born July 15, 1972) is a Cuban baseball player and Olympic gold medalist.

Martínez is a one-time gold medalist for baseball, winning at the 1996 Summer Olympics.
