= Byron Ward =

Dutch baseball player (born 1969)

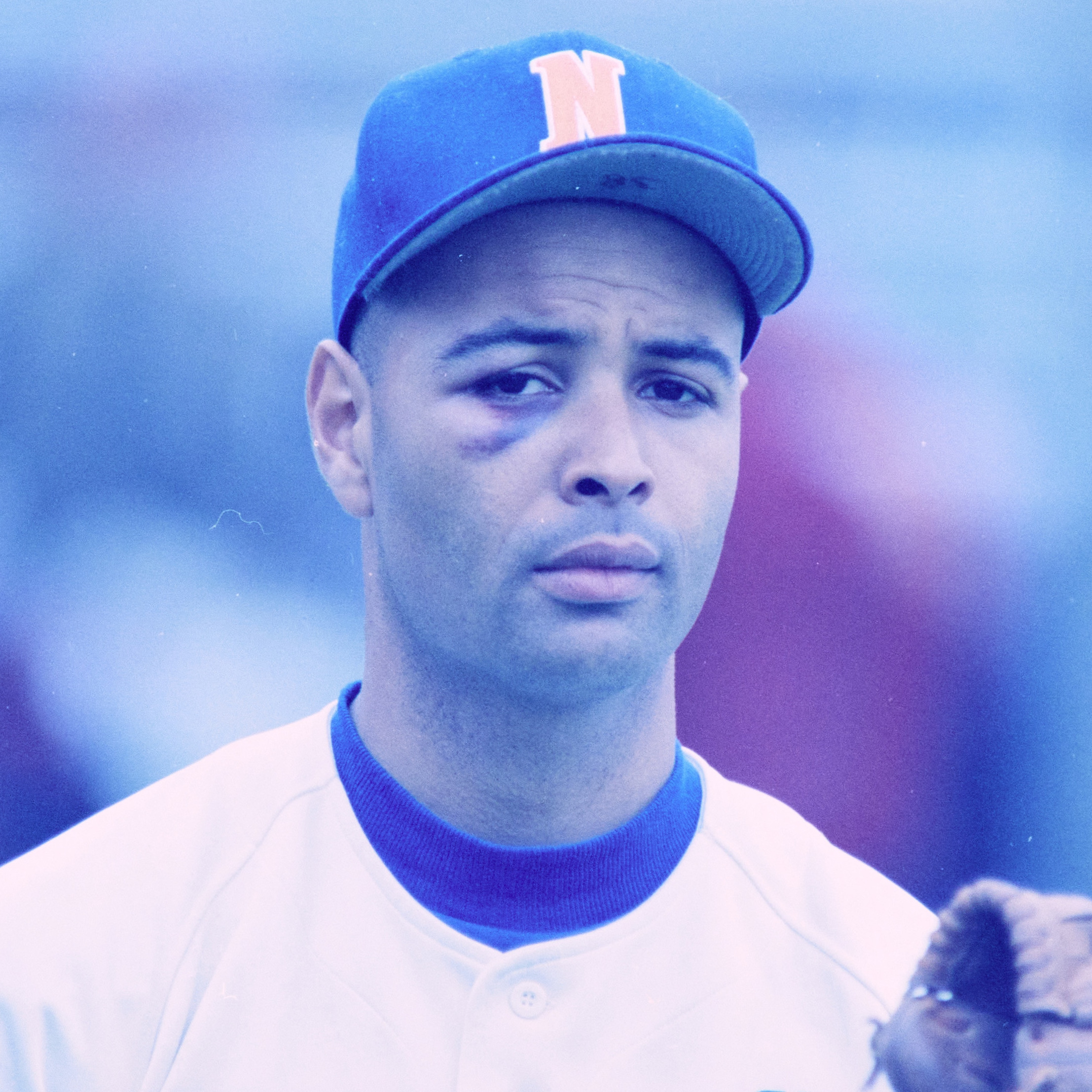
- Ward during Haarlem Baseball Week in 1996
- Third baseman
- Born: February 11, 1969 (age 57); Amsterdam, The Netherlands
Medals
Men's baseball
Representing Netherlands
European Baseball Championship
Gold medal – first place	1987 Netherlands	National team

Ruben Byron Ward (born February 11, 1969) is a Dutch former baseball player who represented the Netherlands at the 1996 Summer Olympics. He scored one of two Dutch runs in an 18–2 mercy rule loss to Cuba. Playing third base, he went hitless in his other three games with one walk. Ward also was on the Dutch team that won the 1987 European Baseball Championship.

Ward played youth baseball for Amsterdam Pirates. After his playing career, he was a coach for the Dutch national under-12 baseball team in 2019 and coached youth teams for the Pirates. Later, he and his family moved to Curaçao.
