= Fredy Zamora =

Nicaraguan baseball player (born 1967)

- Born: July 18, 1967 (age 59); Managua, Nicaragua

Fredy Zamora (born July 30, 1967) is a retired baseball player who competed at the 1996 Summer Olympics for Nicaragua. His team placed 4th in the baseball tournament, losing to the United States in the bronze medal match.
