= Brian Loyd =

American baseball player

Personal information
- Born: December 3, 1973 (age 52) Lynwood, California, U.S.
Medal record
Men's baseball
Representing United States
Olympic Games
| Bronze medal – third place | 1996 Atlanta | Team competition |

Brian Richard Loyd (born December 3, 1973) is a former professional baseball player and an Olympic bronze medalist in baseball. His minor league baseball career spanned from 1996 to 2003. He was born in Lynwood, California.
