= Jorge Fumero =

Cuban baseball player

Medal record

Representing Cuba

Men's baseball
Gold medal – first place	1996 Atlanta	Team

Jorge F. Fumero Fernández (born August 29, 1968) is a Cuban baseball player and Olympic gold medalist.

Fumero is a one time Gold medalist for baseball, winning at the 1996 Summer Olympics.
