= Chikako Murakami (basketball) =

Japanese basketball player

Personal information
- Nationality: Japanese
- Born: 10 October 1970 (age 55) Tokoname, Japan

Sport
- Sport: Basketball

Chikako Murakami (born 10 October 1970) is a Japanese basketball player. She competed in the women's tournament at the 1996 Summer Olympics.
