= Jacque Jones =

American baseball player (born 1975)

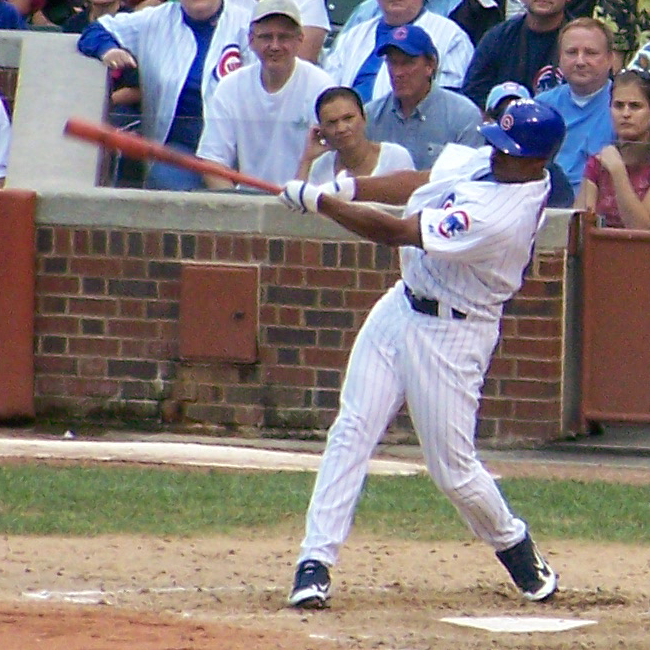
- Jones with the Chicago Cubs
- Outfielder
- Born: April 25, 1975 (age 50); San Diego, California, U.S.
- Batted: Left Threw: Left

MLB debut
- June 9, 1999, for the Minnesota Twins

Last MLB appearance
- June 10, 2008, for the Florida Marlins

MLB statistics
- Batting average: .277
- Home runs: 165
- Runs batted in: 630
- Stats at Baseball Reference

Teams
- Minnesota Twins (1999–2005); Chicago Cubs (2006–2007); Detroit Tigers (2008); Florida Marlins (2008)
Medals
Men's baseball
Representing United States
Olympic Games
Bronze medal – third place	1996 Atlanta	Team

Jacque Dewayne Jones (born April 25, 1975) is an American former Major League Baseball outfielder for the Minnesota Twins, Chicago Cubs, Detroit Tigers and Florida Marlins. He also coached for the Washington Nationals.

== Early life ==
He graduated from San Diego High School in 1993, and the University of Southern California, where he had a stellar career. In 1994, he was a first team all-American outfielder for the Trojans. In 1996, he was a member of the US Olympic Baseball team. In 1993, he was named player of the year in the SCL with, .332 batting average, 33 home runs, and 124 RBI.

== Professional career ==
=== Minnesota Twins ===
Jacque was drafted by the Minnesota Twins in the second round of the 1996 amateur draft. He played three seasons in the minor leagues, and was brought up to the majors in 1999. He started off in center field, but moved to left to accommodate Torii Hunter. Between 2002-2003, he batted over .300, and went to the playoffs with the Twins. The Twins outfield was one of the fastest in baseball in 2005, boasting Jones, Hunter and Shannon Stewart. With the acquisition of Stewart, Jones was moved to right field. Jacque was able to hit for power and averaged 20 home runs between 2000-2005.

Jones officially ended his relationship with the Twins by turning down arbitration on December 19, 2005. After considering a deal to play for St. Louis, he signed a three-year deal with the Chicago Cubs just a day later.

=== Chicago Cubs ===
On August 15, 2006, Jones hit a home run over the center field wall against Roger Clemens at Minute Maid Park, well over 440 feet. He finished the 2006 season strong with a .285 batting average, and tied his career best with 27 home runs.

After the 2006 season, it appeared Jones' future with Chicago was uncertain. It was rumored that he had requested a trade and a deal was in the works, but on February 17, 2007, he asked to not be traded, and that he was hoping to have a comeback year. Jones remained with the Cubs to start the 2007 season, though he was never really accepted by the fan base, partly due to his lack of production and partly due to questionable comments regarding the teams decision to fire Dusty Baker, whom Jones said he came to Chicago to play for. Baker was replaced by Lou Piniella in December 2006. Early in the 2007 season he became disgruntled with his playing time and the Cubs again sought to trade him. Trades with the San Diego Padres and Los Angeles Dodgers fell through in June 2007 because of new owner Sam Zell's unwillingness to transfer money to another team to cover Jones' remaining salaries.

=== Detroit Tigers ===
On November 12, 2007, Jones was traded to the Detroit Tigers for infielder Omar Infante. After getting off to a poor start, batting just .165 in his first 24 games, he was designated for assignment by the Tigers on May 5, 2008. As a Tiger, Jacque Jones's best game was against the Texas Rangers where he had his only home run in a Detroit uniform as well as a triple, which came in back to back at bats. However, on May 13, he was released by the Tigers.

=== Florida Marlins ===
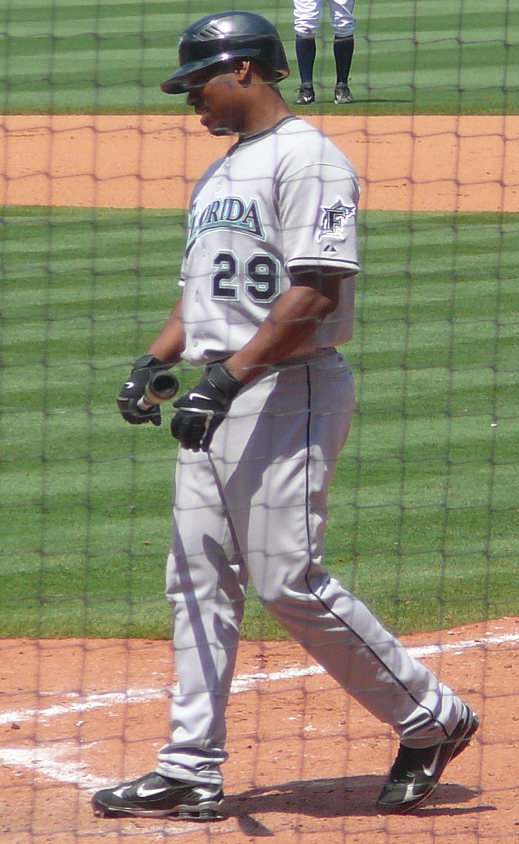
Jacque Jones with Marlins in 2008.

On May 19, 2008, Jones signed a minor league deal with the Florida Marlins. Jones first reported to extended spring training in Jupiter, Florida. On May 23, he was added to the major league roster and made his Marlin debut in center field on May 25. He was designated for assignment on June 11 and became a free agent on June 20 after rejecting his assignment to the minors.

=== Cincinnati Reds ===
On February 5, 2009, Jones signed a minor league contract with an invitation to spring training with the Cincinnati Reds. He did not make the team, and was reassigned to the minor league camp on March 30. He was cut after a poor spring training. He chose to leave the Reds, rather than accept a minor league contract.

=== Return to Minnesota ===
Jones signed a minor league contract with the Minnesota Twins on February 9, 2010. He was assigned to the minor league after that. He received very loud standing ovations during his at-bats during two exhibition games against the St. Louis Cardinals at Target Field.

== After retirement from playing ==
Jones was on the ballot for Baseball Hall of Fame in 2014 but received only one vote, less than the minimum 5% needed to appear in subsequent years.

Jones was hired as the hitting coach for the Class A Fort Wayne TinCaps by the San Diego Padres for the 2012 season. In 2013, he was promoted to be the hitting coach for the Double-A San Antonio Missions. In 2014, he was named the hitting coach for the Triple-A El Paso Chihuahuas but resigned from the job midway through the season. In 2016, he was hired by the Washington Nationals as the team's assistant hitting coach. During their 2017 postseason, just before playing Game 1 of the 2017 National League Division Series on October 6, 2017, the Nationals announced Jones's indefinite suspension with pay pending a team investigation of a revenge porn incident.
