= Yoshiko Fujimoto =

Japanese softball player (born 1974)

Personal information
- Nationality: Japanese
- Born: 25 October 1974 (age 51) Yamaguchi, Japan

Sport
- Sport: Softball

Yoshiko Fujimoto (藤本 佳子, Fujimoto Yoshiko; born 25 October 1974) is a Japanese softball player. She competed in the women's tournament at the 1996 Summer Olympics.
