= Aki Ichijo =

Japanese basketball player

Personal information
- Nationality: Japanese
- Born: 13 November 1969 (age 56) Hiroshima, Japan

Sport
- Sport: Basketball

Aki Ichijo (born 13 November 1969) is a Japanese basketball player. She competed in the women's tournament at the 1996 Summer Olympics, and scored 22 points in a came against the United States team that included Lisa Leslie.
