= Travis Lee =

American baseball player (born 1975)

- First baseman
- Born: May 26, 1975 (age 51); San Diego, California, U.S.
- Batted: Left Threw: Left

MLB debut
- March 31, 1998, for the Arizona Diamondbacks

Last MLB appearance
- September 1, 2006, for the Tampa Bay Devil Rays

MLB statistics
- Batting average: .256
- Home runs: 115
- Runs batted in: 488
- Stats at Baseball Reference

Teams
- Arizona Diamondbacks (1998–2000); Philadelphia Phillies (2000–2002); Tampa Bay Devil Rays (2003); New York Yankees (2004); Tampa Bay Devil Rays (2005–2006)

Career highlights and awards
- Golden Spikes Award (1996)
Medals
Men's baseball
Representing United States
Olympic Games
Bronze medal – third place	1996 Atlanta	Team

Travis Reynolds Lee (born May 26, 1975) is an American former professional first baseman and outfielder who played in Major League Baseball.

== Amateur career ==
Lee graduated from Capital High School in Olympia, Washington in 1993, where he also played football. Being ambidextrous, Lee played as a lefty in baseball and as a quarterback for the Capital High football team threw with his right. While playing for San Diego State University in 1996, Lee won the Golden Spikes Award, annually given to the best amateur baseball player by USA Baseball. Lee was initially drafted as the second pick in the 1996 Major League Baseball draft by the Minnesota Twins, but was declared a free agent by MLB after the Twins failed to tender him a written contract within fifteen days of the end of the draft. He then signed a four-year, $10 million contract with the Arizona Diamondbacks.

== Professional career ==
=== Arizona Diamondbacks ===
Lee was the starting first baseman in the Diamondbacks' inaugural season of 1998, and he hit .269 with 71 runs scored, 22 home runs, and 72 RBI and finished third in the voting for NL Rookie of the Year. Lee has the distinction of having the first hit (a single) as well as hitting the first home run in Diamondbacks history on March 31, 1998, in a home game against the Colorado Rockies; however, the team lost the game 9–2 (Lee also had scored and driven in the first runs in D-Backs history with that blast). Lee was part of the Diamondbacks' trade for Curt Schilling from the Philadelphia Phillies, along with pitchers Vicente Padilla, Omar Daal, and Nelson Figueroa on July 26, 2000.

=== Philadelphia Phillies ===
In 56 games with the Phillies in 2000, Lee batted .239 with 19 runs scored, 1 home run, and 14 RBI. In 2001, his first full season with the Phillies, Lee appeared in 157 of 162 games, the most of any season in his career. Lee batted .258 with a career best 75 runs scored, while hitting 20 home runs, and also driving in a career best 90 RBI. The Phillies finished 86–76, just two games behind the Atlanta Braves for the National League East. In 2002 with the Phillies, Lee played 153 games and batted .265; however, his stats began to decline as he scored 55 runs, hit 13 home runs, and drove in 70 RBI. On December 21, 2002, the Phillies released Lee, granting him free agency, two weeks after signing free agent first baseman Jim Thome.

=== Tampa Bay Devil Rays ===
On February 6, 2003, the Tampa Bay Devil Rays signed Lee to a contract. In 145 games with Tampa Bay, Lee batted a career high .275 while tying his career best with 75 runs scored, hitting 19 home runs, and driving in 70 RBI. On November 2, 2003, Lee was again granted his free agency and on March 2, 2004, he signed with the New York Yankees.

=== New York Yankees ===
In 2004 with the Yankees, Lee appeared in seven games, missing most of the season with a torn labrum in his left shoulder which required surgery. Lee had a .105 batting average, scoring one run and driving in two, but did not hit any home runs. On October 29, 2004, the Yankees declined the club option for a second year on Lee's contract and he was released after the Yankees paid a $250,000 buyout. After again becoming a free agent, Lee re-signed with the Tampa Bay Devil Rays on February 11, 2005.

=== Return to Tampa Bay ===
In 2005, Lee appeared in 129 games batting .272 with 54 runs scored, 12 home runs, and 49 RBI. On June 19, 2005, Lee had his consecutive errorless games streak ended at 170, then the second longest in American League history and only 8 games behind the record held by Mike Hegan whose streak ran from 1970 to 1973. With the bases loaded, Larry Walker grounded out to Lee at 1st base. Lee then threw home with his throw beating David Eckstein to the plate, however, catcher Toby Hall had to stretch for the ball, allowing Eckstein to score and giving Lee a throwing error. Lee's last error prior to this was on May 8, 2003. In his final season of 2006, Lee batted .224 in 114 games, scoring 35 runs, hitting 11 home runs, and driving in 31 RBI. On Mother's Day, May 14, 2006, Lee was one of more than 50 hitters who brandished a pink bat to benefit the Breast Cancer Foundation. On September 10, 2006, Lee was released by the Tampa Bay Devil Rays.

=== Washington Nationals ===
Lee signed a minor league contract with the Washington Nationals on January 18, 2007, and was invited to spring training. On March 25, 2007, he asked for and was granted his release, citing his lack of desire to play the game.

== International career ==
Lee played on the 1996 Olympic baseball team for the United States. The team went 7–2 with losses to Cuba in the preliminary round and Japan in the semifinals. The U.S. team won the bronze medal by defeating Nicaragua.

== Personal life ==
Lee's younger brother, Taber, played in the Pittsburgh Pirates farm system from 2002 to 2007.
