= Kip Harkrider =

American baseball player

Personal information
- Full name: Kiplan Paul Harkrider
- Born: September 16, 1975 (age 50) Carthage, Texas, U.S.
Medal record
Men's baseball
Representing United States
Olympic Games
Bronze medal – third place	1996 Atlanta	Team competition

Kiplan Paul "Kip" Harkrider (born September 16, 1975) is a former professional baseball player and an Olympic bronze medalist in baseball. His minor league baseball career spanned from 1997 to 2007. He was born in Carthage, Texas.
