= Jason Williams (baseball) =

American baseball player

Personal information
- Full name: Jason Gerald Williams
- Born: December 18, 1974 (age 51) Baton Rouge, Louisiana, U.S.
Medal record
Men's baseball
Representing United States
Olympic Games
Bronze medal – third place	1996 Atlanta	Team competition

Jason Gerald Williams (born December 18, 1974) is an American former professional baseball player and an Olympic bronze medalist in baseball. His minor league baseball career spanned from 1997 to 2003. He was born in Baton Rouge, Louisiana.
