= Yoshitomo Tani =

Japanese baseball player

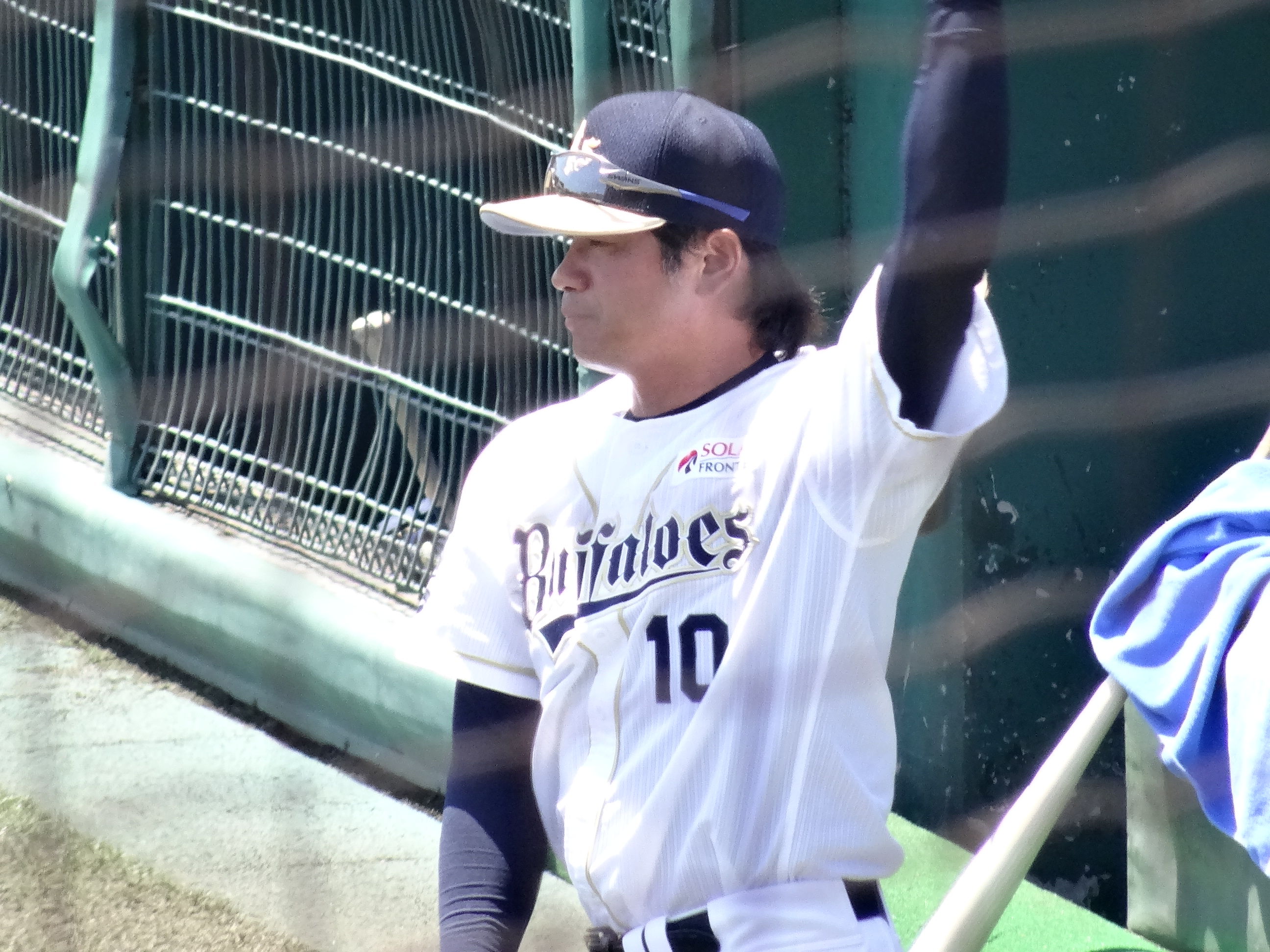
- Outfielder
- Born: February 9, 1973 (age 53)
- Batted: Right Threw: Right

NPB debut
- May 11, 1997, for the Orix BlueWave

Last NPB appearance
- October 3, 2015, for the Orix Buffaloes

Career statistics (through 2015)
- Batting average: .301
- Home runs: 133
- Runs batted in: 741
- Stats at Baseball Reference

Teams
- Orix BlueWave / Buffaloes (1997–2006); Yomiuri Giants (2007–2013); Orix Buffaloes (2014–2015)

Career highlights and awards
- 2× Japan Series champion (2009, 2012)
Medals
Representing Japan
Men's baseball
Summer Olympics
Silver medal – second place	Atlanta 1996	Team competition
Bronze medal – third place	Athens 2004	Team competition
Asian Baseball Championship
Gold medal – first place	Kurashiki 1995	Team competition
Gold medal – first place	Sapporo 2003	Team competition
Intercontinental Cup
Silver medal – second place	Havana 1995	Team competition

Yoshitomo Tani (谷 佳知, born February 9, 1973) is a former Japanese professional baseball player from Higashiōsaka, Osaka, Japan. He played as an outfielder for the Orix Buffaloes and Yomiuri Giants. He holds the Pacific League record for hits in a single season by a right-handed batter with 189 hits in 2003 for Orix. He also holds the Japanese NPB record for doubles in a single season with 52 in 2001.

Tani emerged as a recurrent Best Nine award winner in the late 90s and early 2000s for Orix, and played a large role in carrying the Blue Wave/Buffaloes following Ichiro Suzuki's departure to play with the Seattle Mariners in MLB

== Biography ==
Tani is married to Ryoko Tani, a judoka who has won two gold medals, two silver medals and the bronze in Judo at the Summer Olympics.

He was selected for the Japanese baseball team at the 2004 Summer Olympics, and won a bronze medal. He also won a silver medal at the 1996 Summer Olympics before entering the Japanese professional leagues.

== Career Awards ==
- Most league steals 2002 (43)
- Most league hits 2003 (189)
