= Ikuko Fukita =

Japanese softball player (born 1972)

Personal information
- Nationality: Japanese
- Born: 14 May 1972 (age 52)

Sport
- Sport: Softball

Ikuko Fukita (吹田育子, Fukita Ikuko, born 14 May 1972) is a Japanese softball player. She competed in the women's tournament at the 1996 Summer Olympics.
