= Takako Katō (basketball) =

Japanese basketball player

Personal information
- Born: April 12, 1971 (age 55) Yokohama, Japan
- Listed height: 1.80 m (5 ft 11 in)
- Listed weight: 69 kg (152 lb)

Career history
- 2000–2001: Libertas Trogylos Basket
Medals
Women's basketball
Representing Japan
Asian Games
Silver medal – second place	1994 Hiroshima	Team competition

Takako Katō (born April 12, 1971) is a Japanese female former professional basketball player. She won a silver medal with the Japan women's national basketball team at the 1994 Asian Games. Katō also competed at the 1996 Summer Olympics, where Japan's team came in seventh place.
