= Luigi Carrozza =

- Catcher
- Born: 17 June 1969 (age 57); Lausanne, Switzerland
- Bats: Right Throws: Right
Medals
Men's baseball
Representing Italy
European Baseball Championship
Silver medal – second place	1995 Netherlands	National team
Gold medal – first place	1997 France	National team

Luigi Carrozza (born 17 June 1969 in Lausanne, Switzerland) is a former prominent player in Italian baseball. He played in Serie A1 from 1989 to 2009 and was on the Italian National Baseball Team for many years as well.

He played in the 1992 Olympics, 1994 Baseball World Cup, 1995 Intercontinental Cup, 1995 European Baseball Championship, 1996 Olympics, 1997 Intercontinental Cup, 1997 European Baseball Championship, 1998 Baseball World Cup, 1999 Intercontinental Cup, 2000 Olympics and the 2007 European Cup.
