= Kyoko Mochida =

Japanese softball player

Personal information
- Nationality: Japanese
- Born: 16 July 1974 (age 50); Saitama, Japan

Sport
- Sport: Softball

Kyoko Mochida (持田京子, Mochida Kyoko, born 16 July 1974) is a Japanese softball player. She competed in the women's tournament at the 1996 Summer Olympics.
