= Tadahito Iguchi =

Japanese baseball player (born 1974)

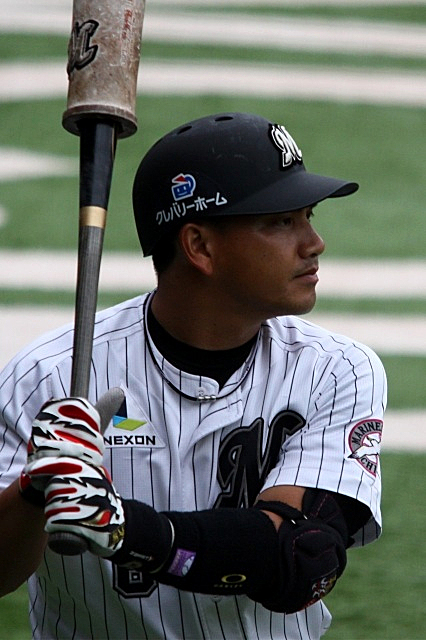
- Iguchi with the Chiba Lotte Marines
- Second baseman / First baseman / Manager
- Born: December 4, 1974 (age 51); Nishitōkyō, Tokyo Japan
- Batted: Right Threw: Right

Professional debut
- NPB: May 3, 1997, for the Fukuoka Daiei Hawks
- MLB: April 4, 2005, for the Chicago White Sox

Last appearance
- MLB: September 28, 2008, for the Philadelphia Phillies
- NPB: September 24, 2017, for the Chiba Lotte Marines

NPB statistics
- Batting average: .270
- Hits: 1,760
- Home runs: 251
- Runs batted in: 1,017

MLB statistics
- Batting average: .268
- Hits: 494
- Home runs: 44
- Runs batted in: 205
- Stats at Baseball Reference

Teams
- As player: Fukuoka Daiei Hawks (1997–2004); Chicago White Sox (2005–2007); Philadelphia Phillies (2007); San Diego Padres (2008); Philadelphia Phillies (2008); Chiba Lotte Marines (2009–2017); As manager: Chiba Lotte Marines (2018–2022); Samurai Japan 2026–

Career highlights and awards
- NPB: 3× Japan Series champion (1999, 2003, 2010); MLB: World Series champion (2005)
Medals
Men's baseball
Representing Japan
Olympic Games
Silver medal – second place	1996 Atlanta	Team competition

Tadahito Iguchi (井口 資仁, Iguchi Tadahito; born December 4, 1974), nicknamed "Gucci", is a Japanese professional baseball second baseman and former manager of the Chiba Lotte Marines of Nippon Professional Baseball (NPB).

As a member of the Chicago White Sox in 2005, Iguchi became the first fully Japanese position player to win the World Series, and the second Japanese-born position player to win the World Series behind Dave Roberts.

== Early life and amateur career ==
Born in Tanashi, Tokyo, Japan as Tadahito (忠仁), Iguchi began playing in high school and after graduating in 1993, went to Aoyama Gakuin University where he distinguished himself by hitting the Tohto University Baseball League record of eight home runs in a season and winning the triple crown. He was a member of Japanese National Team in 1996 Summer Olympics that won the silver medal.

== Professional career ==
=== Fukuoka Daiei Hawks ===
He was the first pick in the 1996 draft by Fukuoka Daiei Hawks.

In his debut year of 1997, he hit a grand slam in the first game of his professional career. He suffered a shoulder injury in the 2000 season and had a surgery which ended his season. After the season ended, he changed the Kanji of his first name to the current one (資仁). He recovered fully in 2001 hitting 30 home runs and leading the league with a personal best 44 stolen bases. In 2003, he hit over .300, had over 100 RBI and led the league in steals.

=== Chicago White Sox ===
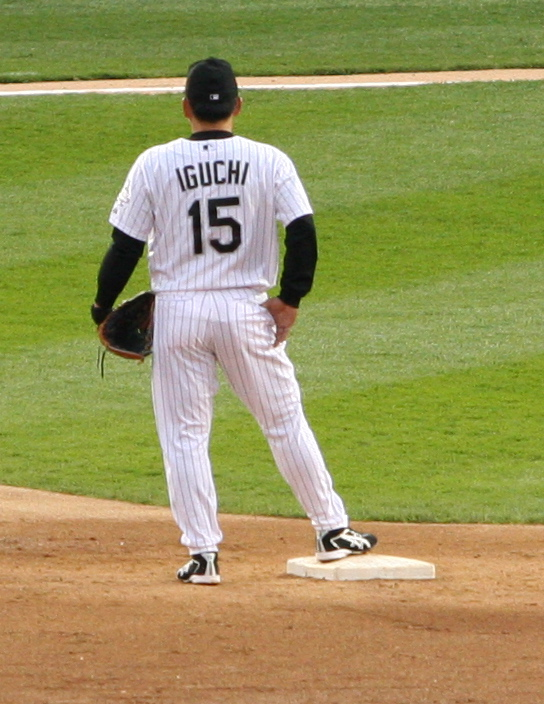
Iguchi playing second base for the White Sox in 2006.

He left Fukuoka Daiei after the 2004 season to play for the Chicago White Sox. During the 2005 MLB season, he had a .278 batting average with 15 home runs and 15 stolen bases. In the 2005 AL Division Series, he hit a go-ahead 3-run home run in Game 2 against the Boston Red Sox, helping the White Sox to a win on their way to a three-game ALDS sweep over Boston, and ultimately a World Series championship three weeks later.

In 2006, Iguchi had two multi-homer games, both times hitting a grand slam (during the May 20 game involving a bench-clearing brawl) and another home run.

Earlier that same year, on April 15, he made arguably the best defensive play of his career against the Toronto Blue Jays, falling after charging, and while fielding, a slow infield chopper hit by Bengie Molina. Despite this, Iguchi would throw Molina out by plenty from his horizontal position.

=== Philadelphia Phillies ===
On July 27, 2007, he was traded to the Philadelphia Phillies for pitcher Michael Dubee. He was the first Asian-born player to join the Phillies.

=== San Diego Padres ===
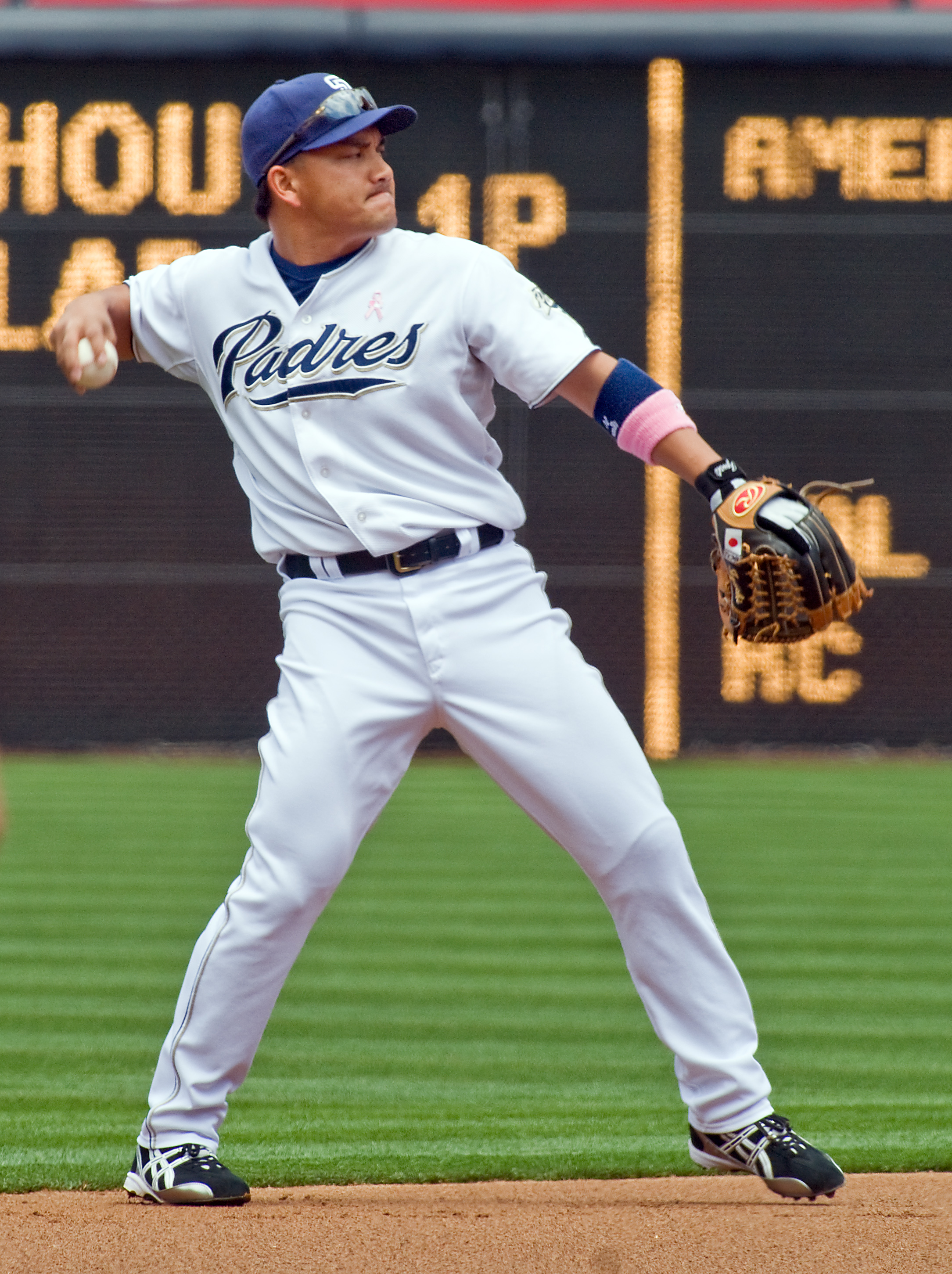
Iguchi with the San Diego Padres

On December 18, 2007, Iguchi signed a one-year deal with the San Diego Padres. He made 81 appearances for San Diego, slashing .231/.292/.304 with two home runs, 24 RBI, and eight stolen bases. Iguchi was released by the Padres on September 1, 2008.

=== Philadelphia Phillies (second stint) ===
On September 5, 2008, the Philadelphia Phillies signed Iguchi, making it the second time the team had acquired him, in less than 14 months. Because Iguchi joined the Phillies after September 1, he was ineligible for the team's postseason roster; thus, Iguchi was not with the Phillies when they defeated the Tampa Bay Rays in the World Series (although he did receive a World Series ring).

=== Chiba Lotte Marines ===
On January 19, 2009, Iguchi returned to Japan to play for the Chiba Lotte Marines.

Iguchi announced his retirement from baseball after the close of the 2017 season in Japan.

== Coaching career ==
On October 12, 2017, Iguchi was hired as the manager of the Chiba Lotte Marines, filling the role that was left vacant after Tsutomu Itō stepped down from the position.

On October 2, 2022, he announced his resignation as the manager of the team.
