= Baseball at the 1996 Summer Olympics =

Baseball at the Games of the XXVI Olympiad
- Venue: Atlanta–Fulton County Stadium
- Dates: July 20 – August 2, 1996
- Teams: 8

Medalists
1st place, gold medalist(s)		Cuba
2nd place, silver medalist(s)		Japan
3rd place, bronze medalist(s)		United States

Baseball had its second appearance as an official medal sport at the 1996 Summer Olympics in Atlanta, United States, with games played at Atlanta–Fulton County Stadium. Eight nations competed, with the preliminary phase consisting of a single round-robin tournament. Playoffs were then held, with the four highest ranked teams advancing. For the semifinals, the first place team played the fourth place team and the second place team played the third place team. The winners of those semifinals competed against each other for the gold medal, with the loser getting the silver medal. The teams defeated in the semifinal played a match for the bronze medal.

Baseball was an event open only to amateurs for the second and last time. Meanwhile, Cuba, which went undefeated in the tournament, used its best players as they were amateurs in name only, with all necessary funding coming from the state.

== Medalists ==
Gold:	Silver:	Bronze:
Cuba; Juan Manrique Garcia; Orestes Kindelán; Antonio Scull; Alberto Hernández; Antonio Pacheco Massó; Juan Padilla; Omar Linares; Lázaro Vargas Alverez; Miguel Caldés Luis; Eduardo Paret; José Estrada González; Rey Isaac Vaillant; Luis Ulacia Alverez; Pedro Luis Lazo; Eliecer Montes de Oca; José Contreras; Omar Luis Martinez; Omar Ajete; Ormari Romero; Jorge Fumero	Japan; Masahiko Mori; Jutaro Kimura; Masao Morinaka; Hitoshi Ono; Takashi Kurosu; Masahiro Nojima; Makoto Imaoka; Kosuke Fukudome; Takayuki Takabayashi; Yasuyuki Saigo; Masanori Sugiura; Takeo Kawamura; Koichi Misawa; Hideaki Okubo; Nobuhiko Matsunaka; Tadahito Iguchi; Takao Kuwamoto; Daishin Nakamura; Tomoaki Sato; Yoshitomo Tani	United States; Kris Benson; R. A. Dickey; Troy Glaus; Chad Green; Seth Greisinger; Travis Lee; Augie Ojeda; Jason Williams; Chad Allen; Kip Harkrider; A. J. Hinch; Jacque Jones; Mark Kotsay; Matt LeCroy; Braden Looper; Brian Loyd; Warren Morris; Jeff Weaver; Jim Parque; Billy Koch

== Teams ==
- United States (Hosts)
- Japan (1995 Asian Baseball Championship gold medalist)
- South Korea (1995 Asian Baseball Championship silver medalist)
- Netherlands (1995 European Baseball Championship gold medalist)
- Italy (1995 European Baseball Championship silver medalist)
- Cuba (1995 Pan American Games gold medalist)
- Nicaragua (1995 Pan American Games silver medalist)
- Australia (Oceania Baseball Championship gold medalist, defeat 1995 Africa Cup Baseball Championship South Africa in a playoff)

== Preliminary round ==
Pos	Team	Pld	W	L	RF	RA	RD	PCT	GB	Qualification
1	Cuba	7	7	0	97	49	+48	1.000	—	Advance to knockout round
2	United States (H)	7	6	1	81	27	+54	.857	1	Advance to knockout round
3	Japan	7	4	3	69	45	+24	.571	3	Advance to knockout round
4	Nicaragua	7	4	3	44	30	+14	.571	3	Advance to knockout round
5	Netherlands	7	2	5	32	76	−44	.286	5	
6	Italy	7	2	5	33	71	−38	.286	5	
7	Australia	7	2	5	47	86	−39	.286	5	
8	South Korea	7	1	6	40	59	−19	.143	6	

(H) Hosts

=== Day 1 (July 20) ===
10:00AM	1	2	3	4	5	6	7	8	9	R	H	E
United States	0	0	0	0	2	2	0	0	0	4	6	0
Nicaragua	1	0	0	0	0	0	0	0	0	1	7	1

3:00PM	1	2	3	4	5	6	7	8	9	R	H	E
Cuba	2	0	3	3	0	8	0	3		19	20	2
Australia	0	4	0	4	0	0	0	0		8	12	5

8:00PM	1	2	3	4	5	6	7	8	9	R	H	E
Japan	1	1	1	0	1	2	6			12	17	0
Netherlands	0	1	0	0	0	0	1			2	6	4

=== Day 2 (July 21) ===
3:00PM	1	2	3	4	5	6	7	8	9	R	H	E
South Korea	1	0	0	0	0	0	0	0	0	1	5	1
Italy	1	0	0	1	0	0	0	0	x	2	6	1

8:00PM	1	2	3	4	5	6	7	8	9	10	R	H	E
Japan	0	1	0	0	1	4	0	0	0	1	7	6	0
Cuba	3	3	0	0	0	0	0	0	0	2	8	12	1

=== Day 3 (July 22) ===
10:00AM	1	2	3	4	5	6	7	8	9	R	H	E
Netherlands	8	2	0	0	0	4	0	2		16	18	1
Australia	0	2	0	0	0	4	0	0		6	7	2

3:00PM	1	2	3	4	5	6	7	8	9	R	H	E
Italy	1	0	1	0	0	0	0	0	0	2	10	1
Nicaragua	3	0	4	0	0	0	0	0	x	7	5	2

8:00PM	1	2	3	4	5	6	7	8	9	R	H	E
South Korea	0	0	0	1	0	1	0	0	0	2	8	4
United States	1	0	0	3	1	0	1	1	x	7	10	3

=== Day 4 (July 23) ===
10:00AM	1	2	3	4	5	6	7	8	9	R	H	E
Netherlands	0	1	0	0	0	1	0			2	4	0
Cuba	2	0	2	1	6	7	x			18	17	0

3:00PM	1	2	3	4	5	6	7	8	9	R	H	E
Nicaragua	0	1	1	5	1	0	0	0	0	8	14	4
South Korea	0	0	1	0	0	0	1	1	0	3	8	1

3:00PM	1	2	3	4	5	6	7	8	9	R	H	E
Australia	0	1	0	0	1	7	0	0	0	9	14	0
Japan	2	0	0	0	0	1	0	0	3	6	11	3

=== Day 5 (July 24) ===
3:00PM	1	2	3	4	5	6	7	8	9	R	H	E
United States	6	0	5	2	0	2	0			15	11	0
Italy	3	0	0	0	0	0	0			3	6	2

8:00PM	1	2	3	4	5	6	7	8	9	R	H	E
Cuba	0	1	1	4	0	3	2	3	0	14	20	0
South Korea	0	0	0	2	0	3	1	0	5	11	17	2

=== Day 6 (July 25) ===
10:00AM	1	2	3	4	5	6	7	8	9	R	H	E
Nicaragua	1	0	4	0	0	0				5	10	0
Netherlands	0	0	0	0	0	0				0	5	1

3:00PM	1	2	3	4	5	6	7	8	9	R	H	E
Italy	3	2	2	2	2	0	0	1	0	12	15	3
Australia	0	2	1	2	1	0	0	2	0	8	12	3

8:00PM	1	2	3	4	5	6	7	8	9	R	H	E
Japan	2	0	2	1	0	0	0			5	6	1
United States	7	0	0	0	7	1	X			15	14	0

=== Day 7 (July 27) ===
10:00AM	1	2	3	4	5	6	7	8	9	R	H	E
Japan	6	2	0	0	2	0	0	2	1	13	13	1
Nicaragua	0	2	0	2	0	0	2	0	0	6	11	2

3:00PM	1	2	3	4	5	6	7	8	9	R	H	E
Italy	0	0	0	0	4	0	2			6	11	7
Cuba	0	4	5	5	4	2	x			20	19	0

8:00PM	1	2	3	4	5	6	7	8	9	R	H	E
Australia	1	2	2	0	0	0	0			5	9	1
United States	7	0	2	6	0	0	x			15	13	0

=== Day 8 (July 28) ===
10:00AM	1	2	3	4	5	6	7	8	9	R	H	E
Netherlands	0	1	1	0	0	0	1	0	0	3	10	0
South Korea	0	3	2	1	5	0	0	0	x	11	16	1

3:00PM	1	2	3	4	5	6	7	8	9	R	H	E
Cuba	4	0	0	0	0	6	0	0	0	10	13	0
United States	1	0	0	0	1	0	3	2	1	8	13	2

8:00PM	1	2	3	4	5	6	7	8	9	R	H	E
Australia	0	0	0	0	0	0	0	0		0	5	2
Nicaragua	0	3	1	1	0	0	0	5		10	13	0

=== Day 9 (July 29) ===
10:00AM	1	2	3	4	5	6	7	8	9	R	H	E
Netherlands	3	0	0	0	0	1	1	0	3	8	13	1
Italy	0	0	0	3	0	1	0	0	3	7	9	1

3:00PM	1	2	3	4	5	6	7	8	9	R	H	E
Nicaragua	1	0	3	1	2	0	0	0	0	7	13	1
Cuba	0	2	2	1	2	0	0	1	X	8	12	1

8:00PM	1	2	3	4	5	6	7	8	9	R	H	E
South Korea	1	0	0	0	0	3	0			4	8	2
Japan	0	0	2	3	5	3	1			14	19	0

=== Day 10 (July 30) ===
10:00AM	1	2	3	4	5	6	7	8	9	R	H	E
United States	5	0	2	2	1	4	3			17	18	1
Netherlands	0	0	0	1	0	0	0			1	3	3

3:00PM	1	2	3	4	5	6	7	8	9	R	H	E
Italy	0	0	0	1	0	0	0	0		1	6	1
Japan	1	2	0	1	3	2	1	2		12	13	0

8:00PM	1	2	3	4	5	6	7	8	9	R	H	E
Australia	0	0	0	8	0	0	1	2	0	11	14	2
South Korea	2	2	3	0	0	0	1	0	0	8	10	3

== Knockout round ==
Semifinals
1	Cuba	8
4	Nicaragua	1
3	Japan	11
2	United States	2

Gold medal game
Cuba	13
Japan	9
Bronze medal game
Nicaragua	3
United States	10

=== Semifinals (August 1) ===
Team	1	2	3	4	5	6	7	8	9	R	H	E
Nicaragua	0	1	0	0	0	0	0	0	0	1	6	2
Cuba	0	0	0	3	0	3	0	2	x	8	14	2

Team	1	2	3	4	5	6	7	8	9	R	H	E
Japan	0	3	0	0	3	0	2	2	1	11	15	0
United States	0	0	0	0	0	2	0	0	0	2	6	1

=== Bronze medal match (August 2) ===
Team	1	2	3	4	5	6	7	8	9	R	H	E
United States	4	0	0	1	0	1	1	3	0	10	12	1
Nicaragua	3	0	0	0	0	0	0	0	0	3	3	2

=== Final (August 2) ===
Team	1	2	3	4	5	6	7	8	9	R	H	E
Japan	0	0	0	1	5	0	1	0	2	9	9	1
Cuba	3	3	0	0	0	4	1	2	x	13	14	0

== Final standing ==
Place	Team
Gold	Cuba
Silver	Japan
Bronze	United States
4.	Nicaragua
5.	Netherlands
6.	Italy
7.	Australia
8.	South Korea

1996 Olympic champions

Cuba
Second title

== Statistical leaders ==
=== Batting ===
Statistic	Name	Total/Avg
Batting average*	(Italy) Luigi Carrozza	.571
Hits	(Cuba) Omar Linares	20
Runs	(Cuba) Omar Linares	21
Doubles	(Italy) Francesco Casolari	5
Doubles	(Cuba) Juan Manrique	5
Doubles	(Cuba) Luis Ulacia	5
Triples	(Cuba) José Estrada González	2
Triples	(Japan) Tadahito Iguchi	2
Triples	(United States) Jacque Jones	2
Home runs	(Cuba) Orestes Kindelán	9
Runs batted in	(Cuba) Orestes Kindelán	18
Walks	(Japan) Yasuyuki Saigo	9
Stolen bases	(Cuba) Luis Ulacia	3
On-base percentage*	(Japan) Yasuyuki Saigo	.605
Slugging percentage*	(Cuba) Luis Ulacia	1.148
OPS*	(Cuba) Luis Ulacia	1.719

* Minimum 2.7 plate appearances per team game

=== Pitching ===
Statistic	Name	Total/Avg
Wins	(United States) Seth Greisinger	3
Wins	(Cuba) Omar Luis	3
Saves	10 tied with	1
Innings pitched	(Italy) Roberto Cabalisti	19.2
Earned run average*	(United States) Braden Looper	0.00
Strikeouts	(Japan) Jutaro Kimura	22
Strikeouts	(Cuba) Pedro Lazo	22
Walks allowed*	6 tied with	1
BAA*	(United States) Braden Looper	.143

* Minimum 0.8 innings pitched per team game
