= Takayuki Takabayashi =

Japanese baseball player

Medal record

Men's baseball

Representing Japan

Olympic Games
Silver medal – second place	1996 Atlanta	Team competition

Baseball World Cup
Bronze medal – third place	1994 Managua	Team

Takayuki Takabayashi (高林 孝行, Takabayashi Takayuki; born September 12, 1972) is a Japanese baseball outfielder who won a silver medal in the 1996 Summer Olympics.
