= Hideaki Okubo =

Japanese baseball player (born 1969)

- Outfielder
- Born: July 3, 1969 (age 57); Aikō District, Kanagawa, Japan
- Batted: Left Threw: Right

debut
- May 19, 1998, for the Osaka Kintetsu Buffaloes

Last appearance
- August 12, 2000, for the Osaka Kintetsu Buffaloes

Career statistics
- Batting average: .232
- Home runs: 2
- Runs batted in: 11
- Stats at Baseball Reference

Teams
- Osaka Kintetsu Buffaloes (1998–2000)
Medals
Men's baseball
Representing Japan
Olympic Games
Silver medal – second place	1996 Atlanta	Team

Hideaki Okubo (大久保 秀昭, Okubo Hideaki; born July 3, 1969) is a Japanese baseball catcher who won a silver medal in the 1996 Summer Olympics. He also played for the Osaka Kintetsu Buffaloes in the Pacific League from 1998 to 2000.
