= Emi Tsukada =

Japanese softball player

Personal information
- Nationality: Japanese
- Born: 14 June 1972 (age 52); Hokkaido, Japan

Sport
- Sport: Softball

Emi Tsukada (塚田恵美, born 14 June 1972)is a Japanese softball player. She competed in the women's tournament at the 1996 Summer Olympics.
