= Makoto Imaoka =

Japanese baseball player (born 1974)

Makoto Imaoka 今岡 真訪
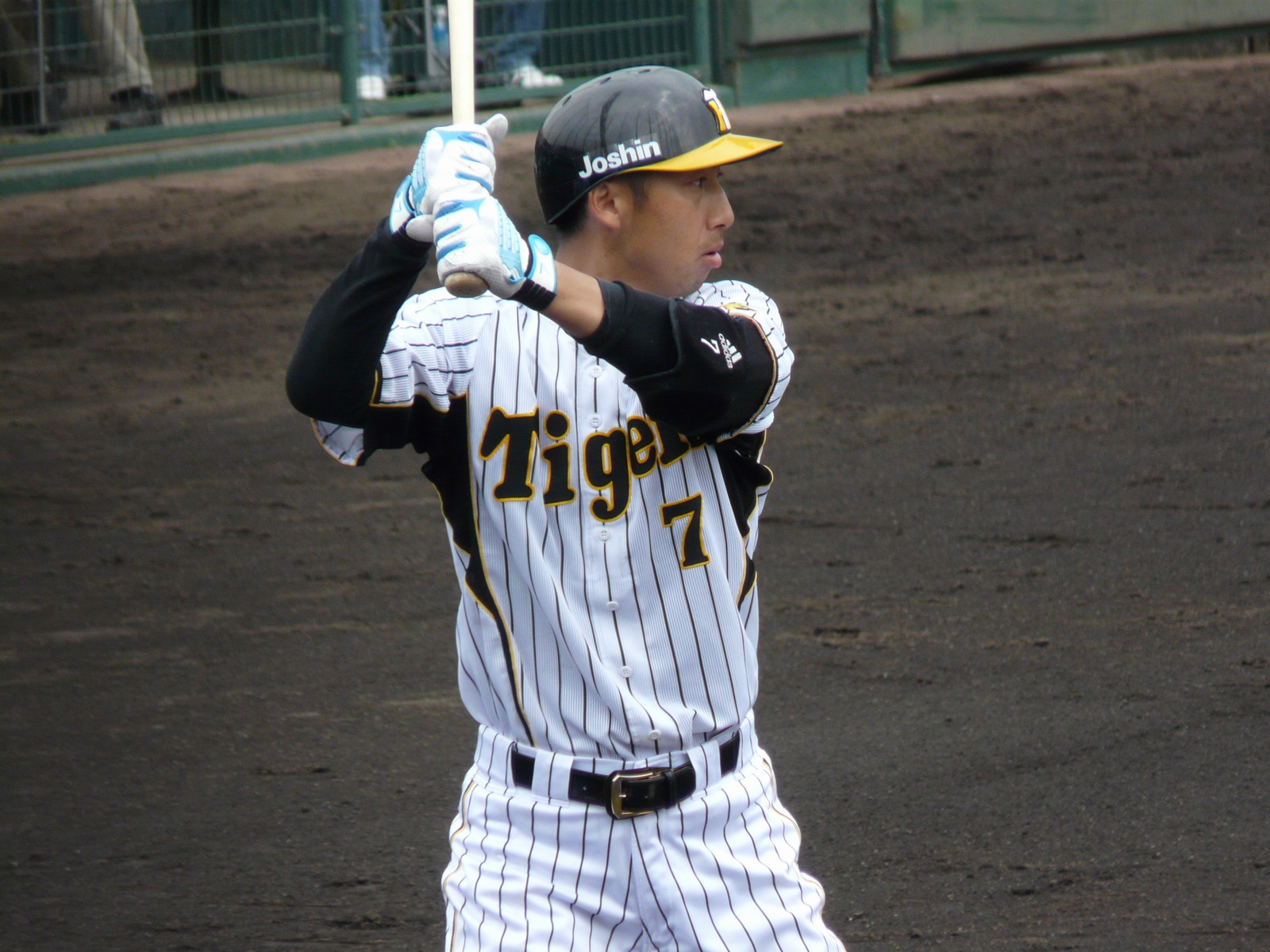
- Infielder / Coach
- Born: September 11, 1974 (age 51); Takarazuka, Hyōgo, Japan
- Batted: Right Threw: Right

NPB debut
- April 8, 1997, for the Hanshin Tigers

Last NPB appearance
- June 5, 2011, for the Chiba Lotte Marines

NPB statistics
- Batting average: .279
- Hits: 1,284
- Home runs: 122
- Runs batted in: 594
- Stats at Baseball Reference

Teams
- As player: Hanshin Tigers (1997–2009); Chiba Lotte Marines (2010–2012); As coach: Chiba Lotte Marines (2012, 2018–2021); Hanshin Tigers (2016–2017, 2023–2024)

Career highlights and awards
- 5× NPB All-Star (1998, 2002–2005); Golden Glove Award (2003); 3× Best Nine Award (2002–2003, 2005); Central League Batting Champion (2003); Central League RBI Champion (2005); Japan Series Champion (2010)
Medals
Representing Japan
Men's baseball
Summer Olympics
Silver medal – second place	Atlanta 1996	Team competition
Intercontinental Cup
Silver medal – second place	Havana 1995	Team competition

Makoto Imaoka (今岡 真訪, Imaoka Makoto; real name: 今岡 誠, born September 11, 1974), nicknamed "Makochan", is a Japanese former professional baseball infielder. He played in Nippon Professional Baseball from 1997 to 2012 for the Hanshin Tigers and Chiba Lotte Marines.

== Playing career ==
Imaoka spent several uneventful seasons in the Japanese professional leagues before being chosen as the leadoff batter by Senichi Hoshino, who managed the Hanshin Tigers from 2002 to 2004. Imaoka won the batting title in 2003 with a .340 batting average, and his team won the Central League pennant the same year. He had previously played shortstop and second base, but was converted to third base in 2004. He continued his hitting prowess, and led the league with 147 RBI in 2005. He fell into a huge slump in 2006, and missed half of the season due to injuries.

He won a silver medal playing for the Japanese national team in the 1996 Summer Olympics before entering the Japanese professional leagues.

== Coaching career ==
Imaoka spent the 2023 and 2024 seasons as the hitting coach for the Hanshin Tigers. On October 14, 2024, Hanshin announced that Imaoka was leaving the team.

== Career statistics ==
SEASON	TEAM	Squad number	G	AB	R	H	2B	3B	HR	RBI	SB	AVG
1997	T	7	98	252	18	63	11	1	2	20	1	.250
1998	T	7	133	471	48	138	20	3	7	44	6	.293
1999	T	7	128	457	36	115	11	1	6	39	4	.252
2000	T	7	40	113	8	24	5	0	1	2	0	.212
2001	T	7	123	400	36	107	15	0	4	40	3	.268
2002	T	7	122	505	46	160	40	0	15	56	0	.317
2003	T	7	120	485	67	165	35	1	12	72	1	.340
2004	T	7	138	572	87	175	29	0	28	83	0	.306
2005	T	7	146	559	71	156	26	2	29	147	1	.279
2006	T	7	59	204	16	45	3	2	7	29	1	.220
2007	T	7	85	323	23	90	8	0	4	24	0	.279
2008	T	7	55	169	15	29	3	0	7	29	0	.172
2009	T	7	23	30	0	4	2	0	0	2	0	.133
2010	M	2	26	44	3	10	2	0	0	6	0	.227
2011	M	2	13	23	2	3	1	0	0	1	0	.130
Total			1309	4607	476	1284	211	10	122	594	17	.279
