= Masao Morinaka =

Japanese baseball player

- Pitcher
- Born: April 9, 1974 (age 52); Mishima, Shizuoka, Japan
- Batted: Left Threw: Left

debut
- April 4, 1997, for the Yokohama Bay Stars

Last appearance
- August 27, 2003, for the Yokohama Bay Stars

Career statistics
- Win–loss record: 17–15
- Earned run average: 3.97
- Strikeouts: 193
- Stats at Baseball Reference

Teams
- Yokohama Bay Stars (1997–2003)
Medals
Men's baseball
Representing Japan
Olympic Games
Silver medal – second place	1996 Atlanta	Team

Masao Morinaka (森中 聖雄, born April 9, 1974) is a former professional baseball player who played for the Yokohama BayStars. He currently works as a batting pitcher for the Yomiuri Giants organization.

Morinaka was drafted by the Yokohama BayStars in the second round of the 1996 amateur draft. He was a valuable left-handed reliever, but was dropped after only 7 seasons in 2003. He marked a 2.16 ERA in 41 appearances in 1999, and a 2.38 ERA in 53 appearances in 2000. He hit a home run at the Koshien baseball stadium in his final season.

He won a silver medal playing for the Japanese national team in the 1996 Summer Olympics before entering the Japanese professional leagues.
