= Koichi Misawa =

Japanese baseball player (born 1974)

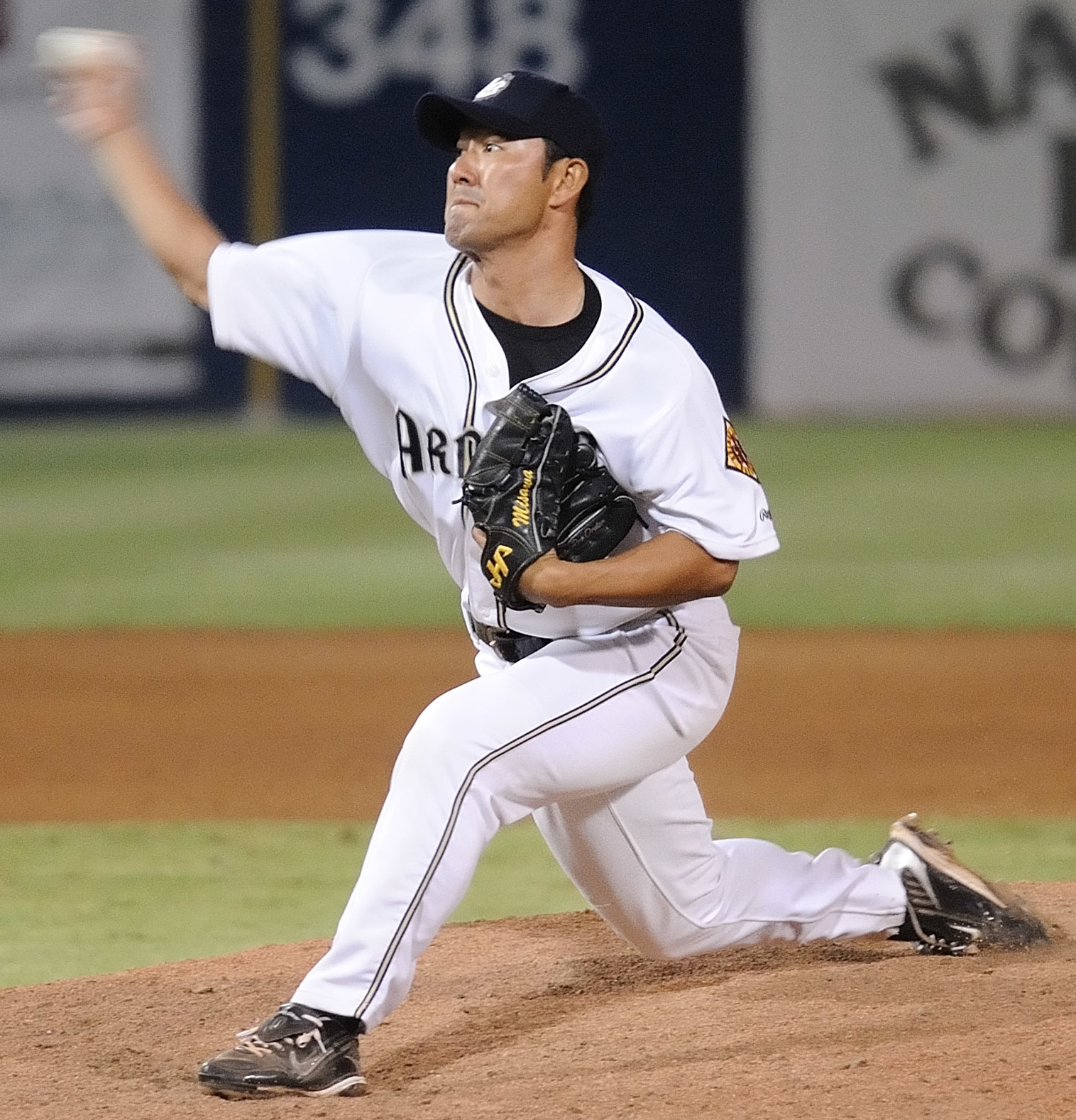
- Misawa with the Long Beach Armada in 2009

Yomiuri Giants – No. 100
- Pitcher / Coach
- Born: June 8, 1974 (age 52); Saitama Prefecture, Japan
- Bats: Right Throws: Right

NPB debut
- April 29, 1997, for the Yomiuri Giants

Career statistics (through 2007 season)
- Win–loss record: 28-18
- Earned Run Average: 3.98
- Strikeouts: 306
- Saves: 6
- Stats at Baseball Reference

Teams
- As player: Yomiuri Giants (1997–2001, 2004); Osaka Kintetsu Buffaloes (2001–2003); Yakult Swallows/Tokyo Yakult Swallows (2005–2006); Chunichi Dragons (2007); As coach: Yomiuri Giants (2017–)
Medals
Men's baseball
Representing Japan
Olympic Games
Silver medal – second place	1996 Atlanta	Team competition

Koichi Misawa (三澤 興一, Misawa Koichi; born June 8, 1974) is a Japanese baseball pitcher who won a silver medal in the 1996 Summer Olympics. He also played for the Yomiuri Giants, Osaka Kintetsu Buffaloes, and the Tokyo Yakult Swallows in Nippon Professional Baseball from 1997 to 2005.

In 2008, he came to the United States to play in the independent Northern League with the Gary SouthShore RailCats. He posted a 1.69 earned run average in 42.2 innings pitched. Gary manager Greg Tagert later told the Chicago Tribune that Misawa "was the absolute best I’ve ever seen coming out the bullpen at our level." During the winter, Misawa played for the Caribes de Anzoátegui in the Venezuelan Professional Baseball League and pitched two thirds of an inning for the Leones del Escogido of the Dominican Professional Baseball League. In 2009, he played his final professional season with the Long Beach Armada of the Golden Baseball League.
