= Masahiro Nojima =

Japanese baseball player (born 1971)

Medal record

Men's baseball

Representing Japan

Olympic Games
Silver medal – second place	1996 Atlanta	Team competition

Masahiro Nojima (野島正弘, Nojima Masahiro; born August 13, 1971 in Saitama Prefecture) is a Japanese baseball infielder who won a silver medal in the 1996 Summer Olympics.
