= Takao Kuwamoto =

Japanese baseball player

Medal record

Men's baseball

Representing Japan

Olympic Games
Silver medal – second place	1996 Atlanta	Team competition

Takao Kuwamoto (桑元孝雄, Kuwamoto Takao; born March 24, 1970) is a Japanese baseball second baseman who won a silver medal in the 1996 Summer Olympics.
