= Masahiko Mori =

Japanese baseball player (born 1965)

Medal record

Men's baseball

Representing Japan

Olympic Games
Silver medal – second place	1996 Atlanta	Team competition

Masahiko Mori (森 昌彦, Mori Masahiko; born August 25, 1965 in Mie Prefecture, Japan) is a Japanese baseball pitcher who won a silver medal in the 1996 Summer Olympics.
