= Takashi Kurosu =

Japanese baseball player

Medal record

Men's baseball

Representing Japan

Olympic Games
Silver medal – second place	1996 Atlanta	Team competition

Takashi Kurosu (黒須 隆, Kurosu Takashi; born September 18, 1968 in Saitama Prefecture) is a Japanese baseball catcher who won a silver medal in the 1996 Summer Olympics.
