= Eliecer Montes de Oca =

Cuban baseball player (born 1971)

- Pitcher
- Born: March 28, 1971 (age 55); Villa Clara, Cuba
- Bats: Right Throws: Right

Eliecer Montes de Oca
Medal record

Men's baseball

Representing Cuba

Olympic Games
Gold medal – first place	1996 Atlanta	Team

Pan American Games
Gold medal – first place	1995 Mar del Plata	Team

Eliecer Montes de Oca Fleitas (born March 28, 1971) is a Cuban former professional baseball pitcher and Olympic gold medalist.

== Career ==
Eliecer Montes de Oca is a one time Gold medalist for baseball, winning at the 1996 Summer Olympics.
