= Daishin Nakamura =

Japanese baseball player (born 1966)

Medal record

Men's baseball

Representing Japan

Olympic Games
Silver medal – second place	1996 Atlanta	Team competition

Daishin Nakamura (中村大伸, Nakamura Daishin; born February 11, 1966 in Tokyo) is a Japanese baseball outfielder who won a silver medal in the 1996 Summer Olympics.
