= Yasuyuki Saigo =

Japanese baseball player

- Outfielder
- Born: August 30, 1972 (age 53); Tokyo, Japan
- Bats: Left Throws: Left
Medals
Men's baseball
Representing Japan
Olympic Games
Silver medal – second place	1996 Atlanta	Team

Yasuyuki Saigo (西郷 泰之, Saigō Yasuyuki) (born August 30, 1972) is a Japanese former baseball outfielder who won a silver medal in the 1996 Summer Olympics.
