= Jutaro Kimura =

Japanese baseball player

- Pitcher
- Born: May 12, 1968 (age 58); Kumamoto Prefecture, Japan
- Bats: Right Throws: Right
Medals
Men's baseball
Representing Japan
Olympic Games
Silver medal – second place	1996 Atlanta	Team

Jutaro Kimura (木村 重太郎, Kimura Jūtarō; born May 12, 1968) is a Japanese baseball pitcher who won a silver medal in the 1996 Summer Olympics.
