= Takeo Kawamura (baseball) =

Japanese baseball player

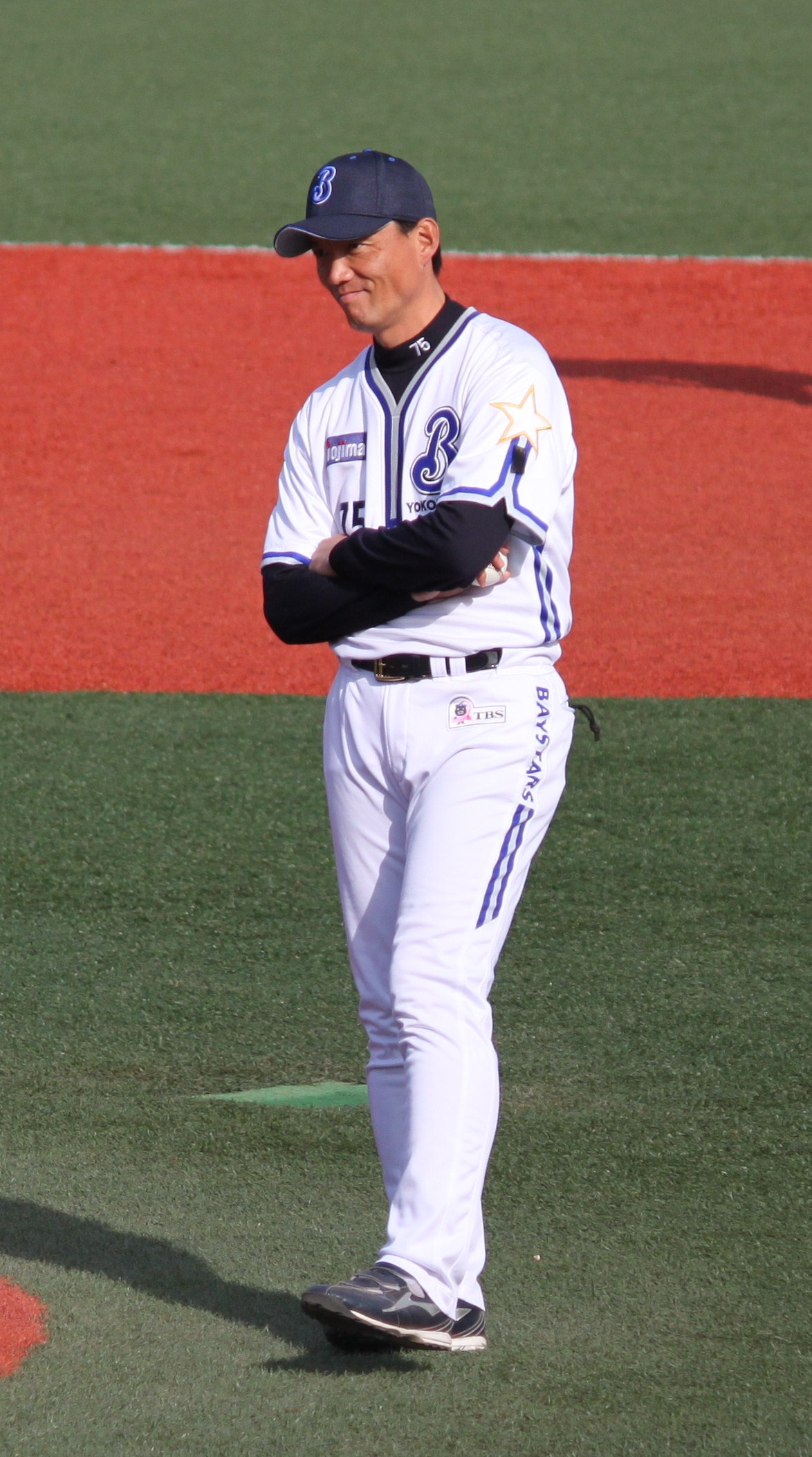

Kanagawa Future Dreams – No. 16
- Pitching coach / Coach / Manager
- Born: April 30, 1972 (age 54); Yamato, Kanagawa, Japan
- Batted: Right Threw: Right

NPB debut
- April 6, 1997, for the Yokohama BayStars

Last NPB appearance
- October 5, 2008, for the Yokohama BayStars

NPB statistics
- Win–loss record: 71–64
- Earned run average: 3.72
- Strikeouts: 815
- Stats at Baseball Reference

Teams
- As player: Yokohama BayStars (1997–2008); As manager: Kanagawa Future Dreams(2022–present); As coach: Yokohama BayStars/Yokohama DeNA BayStars (2009, 2011–2015, 2018–2021)

Career highlights and awards
- 2× NPB All-Star (1998, 1999)
Medals
Men's baseball
Silver medal – second place	Atlanta 1996	Team competition

Takeo Kawamura (川村 丈夫, Kawamura Takeo; born April 30, 1972) is a professional baseball player from Yamato, Kanagawa, Japan. He is a retired pitcher for the Yokohama BayStars.

Kawamura won 17 games in 1999 as a starter, and became a reliever in 2004. He marked a 2.31 ERA in 2005, and returned to the starting rotation in 2007.

He won a silver medal playing for the Japanese national team in the 1996 Summer Olympics before entering the Japanese professional leagues.
