= Tomoaki Sato (baseball, born 1968) =

Japanese baseball player

Medal record

Men's baseball

Representing Japan

Olympic Games
Silver medal – second place	1996 Atlanta	Team competition

Baseball World Cup
Bronze medal – third place	1994 Managua	Team

Tomoaki Sato (佐藤 友昭, Satō Tomoaki; born October 19, 1968 in Aichi Prefecture) is a Japanese baseball player who won a silver medal in the 1996 Summer Olympics.
