= 1997 Intercontinental Cup (baseball) =

The 1997 IBAF Intercontinental Cup was held in Barcelona, Spain from August 1 through to August 10, 1997. Eight countries contested the tournament including Cuba, Australia, Italy, Nicaragua, Japan, France, United States of America and the host Spain. The tournament was sanctioned by the International Baseball Federation.

The tournament saw the Japan national baseball team stun the Cuba national baseball team in the final, 11-2, ending a 14-year tournament dominance which included 7 tournament golds. The tournament MVP was Australia's Paul Gonzalez.

== All-Star team ==
- C: Gary White, Australia (.351/.368/.622)
- 1B: Orestes Kindelán, Cuba .344/.417/.938, 6 HR, 10 R, 15 RBI)
- 2B: Yosuke Takasu, Japan (.429/.478/.524)
- SS: Omar Linares, Cuba (.367/.444/.633, 9 RBI)
- 3B: Paul Gonzalez, Australia (.571/.684/1.25, 5 HR, 9 BB, 8 R, 18 RBI)
- OF: Luis Ulacia, Cuba (.343/.400/.514, 10 R, 3 SB)
- OF: Yoshinobu Takahashi, Japan (.419/.513/1.032, 3 3B, 4 HR, 7 BB, 13 R, 16 RBI)
- OF: Chris Magruder, USA (.343/.412/.400, 8 R)
- DH: Greg Jelks, Australia (.471/.538/1.088, 6 HR, 10 R, 12 RBI)
- P: Koji Uehara, Japan (2-0, 0.53)
- P: Akio Shimizu, Japan (2-0, 1.64)
