= Intercontinental Cup (baseball) =

Baseball competition sanctioned by the International Baseball Federation

- Most recent season or competition: 2009 16U AA World Youth Championship
- Sport: Baseball
- Founded: 1973
- Folded: 2011
- No. of teams: 8 (Finals)
- Continent: International
- Last champion: Cuba
- Most titles: Cuba (11 titles)

The Intercontinental Cup was a baseball tournament between the members of the then-International Baseball Federation (IBAF). It was first held in 1973 in Italy, and was held every other year following until 1999.

After 1999, the tournament was held every few four years—in 2002, 2006 and 2010. The tournament was dominated by Cuba which won 10 gold and 3 silver in 16 tournaments. The most recent tournament was held in 2010, in Taichung, Taiwan, and appears to have been the last time the tournament was held.

The first two tournaments, in 1973 and 1975, were organized by the IBAF splinter group FEMBA during a period of international baseball conflict. The groups reunited in 1976 and continued to present the competition.

== Results ==
Year	Host	Medalists		
Year	Host	Gold	Silver	Bronze
1973; Details	(Italy); Parma and Rimini	Japan	Puerto Rico	United States
1975; Details	(Canada); Montreal	United States	Japan	Nicaragua
1977; Details	(Nicaragua); Managua	South Korea	United States	Japan
1979; Details	(Cuba); Havana	Cuba	Japan	United States
1981; Details	(Canada); Edmonton	United States	Cuba	
1983; Details	(Belgium); Antwerp	Cuba	United States	Chinese Taipei
1985; Details	(Canada); Edmonton	Cuba	South Korea	Japan
1987; Details	(Cuba); Havana	Cuba	United States	Japan
1989; Details	(Puerto Rico); San Juan	Cuba	Japan	Puerto Rico
1991; Details	(Spain); Barcelona	Cuba	Japan	Nicaragua
1993; Details	Italy (Note: Games were hosted in Macerata, Rimini, Bologna, Verona, Novara, Modena, Reggio Emilia, and Parma)	Cuba	United States	Japan
1995; Details	(Cuba); Havana	Cuba	Japan	Nicaragua
1997; Details	(Spain); Barcelona	Japan	Cuba	Australia
1999; Details	(Australia); Sydney	Australia	Cuba	Japan
2002; Details	(Cuba); Havana	Cuba	South Korea	Dominican Republic
2002; Details	(Cuba); Havana	Cuba	South Korea	Panama (DSQ)
2006; Details	(Taiwan); Taichung	Cuba	Netherlands	Chinese Taipei
2010; Details	(Taiwan); Taichung and Yunlin	Cuba	Netherlands	Italy

== Medal table ==
Rank	Nation	Gold	Silver	Bronze	Total
1	Cuba	11	3	0	14
2	Japan	2	5	5	12
3	United States	2	4	2	8
4	South Korea	1	2	0	3
5	Australia	1	0	1	2
6	Netherlands	0	2	0	2
7	Puerto Rico	0	1	1	2
8	Nicaragua	0	0	3	3
9	Chinese Taipei	0	0	2	2
9	Dominican Republic	0	0	2	2
11	Italy	0	0	1	1
Totals (11 entries)		17	17	17	51

== See also ==
- Baseball awards § World
