= United States at the 1996 Summer Olympics =

- Flag of the United States
- IOC code: USA
- NOC: United States Olympic Committee

in Atlanta
- Competitors: 646 (375 men and 271 women) in 29 sports
- Flag bearers: Bruce Baumgartner (opening); Michael R. Matz (closing)
- Medals Ranked 1st: Gold 44 Silver 32 Bronze 25 Total 101

Summer Olympics appearances (overview)
- 1896; 1900; 1904; 1908; 1912; 1920; 1924; 1928; 1932; 1936; 1948; 1952; 1956; 1960; 1964; 1968; 1972; 1976; 1980; 1984; 1988; 1992; 1996; 2000; 2004; 2008; 2012; 2016; 2020; 2024; 2028

Other related appearances
- 1906 Intercalated Games

The United States (USA) was the host nation for the 1996 Summer Olympics in Atlanta. 646 competitors, 375 men and 271 women, took part in 263 events in 31 sports.

With a total of 44 gold, 32 silver, and 25 bronze medals, the United States returned to the top spot in the medal standings for the first time since 1984, and for the first time since 1968 in a non-boycotted Summer Olympics.

== Medalists ==
The following U.S. competitors won medals at the games. In the discipline sections below, the medalists' names are bolded.

| Medal | Name | Sport | Event | Date |
|---|---|---|---|---|
| Gold | Tom Dolan | Swimming | Men's 400 meter individual medley | July 21 |
| Gold | Ryan Berube; Josh Davis; Joe Hudepohl; Jon Olsen^{[a]} Brad Schumacher | Swimming | Men's 4 × 200 meter freestyle relay | July 21 |
| Gold | Amy Van Dyken | Swimming | Women's 100 meter butterfly | July 21 |
| Gold | Beth Botsford | Swimming | Women's 100 meter backstroke | July 22 |
| Gold | Catherine Fox; Lisa Jacob^{[a]} Angel Martino; Jenny Thompson; Melanie Valerio^{[a]} Amy Van Dyken | Swimming | Women's 4 × 100 meter freestyle relay | July 22 |
| Gold | Amanda Borden; Amy Chow; Dominique Dawes; Shannon Miller; Dominique Moceanu; Jaycie Phelps; Kerri Strug | Gymnastics | Women's artistic team all around | July 23 |
| Gold | Kim Rhode | Shooting | Women's double trap | July 23 |
| Gold | Jeff Rouse | Swimming | Men's 100 meter backstroke | July 23 |
| Gold | Josh Davis; David Fox^{[a]} Gary Hall Jr. Jon Olsen; Brad Schumacher; Scott Tucker | Swimming | Men's 4 × 100 meter freestyle relay | July 23 |
| Gold | Amanda Beard; Beth Botsford; Catherine Fox^{[a]} Whitney Hedgepeth^{[a]} Angel Martino; Kristine Quance^{[a]} Jenny Thompson^{[a]} Amy Van Dyken | Swimming | Women's 4 × 100 meter medley relay | July 24 |
| Gold | Brooke Bennett | Swimming | Women's 800 meter freestyle | July 25 |
| Gold | Lisa Jacob^{[a]} Trina Jackson; Annette Salmeen^{[a]} Sheila Taormina; Cristina Teuscher; Jenny Thompson; Ashley Whitney^{[a]} | Swimming | Women's 4 × 200 meter freestyle relay | July 25 |
| Gold | Randy Barnes | Athletics | Men's shot put | July 26 |
| Gold | Brad Bridgewater | Swimming | Men's 200 meter backstroke | July 26 |
| Gold | Josh Davis^{[a]} Kurt Grote^{[a]} Gary Hall Jr. John Hargis^{[a]} Mark Henderson; Jeremy Linn; Jeff Rouse; Tripp Schwenk^{[a]} | Swimming | Men's 4 × 100 meter medley relay | July 26 |
| Gold | Amy Van Dyken | Swimming | Women's 50 meter freestyle | July 26 |
| Gold | Kenny Harrison | Athletics | Men's triple jump | July 27 |
| Gold | Gail Devers | Athletics | Women's 100 meters | July 27 |
| Gold | Charles Austin | Athletics | Men's high jump | July 28 |
| Gold | Karch Kiraly; Kent Steffes | Volleyball | Men's beach volleyball | July 28 |
| Gold | Michael Johnson | Athletics | Men's 400 meters | July 29 |
| Gold | Allen Johnson | Athletics | Men's 110 meter hurdles | July 29 |
| Gold | Carl Lewis | Athletics | Men's long jump | July 29 |
| Gold | Shannon Miller | Gymnastics | Women's balance beam | July 29 |
| Gold | United States women's national softball team: Laura Berg; Gillian Boxx; Sheila Cornell; Lisa Fernandez; Michele Granger; Lori Harrigan; Dionna Harris; Kim Maher; Leah O'Brien-Amico; Dot Richardson; Julie Smith; Michele Smith; Shelly Stokes; Dani Tyler; Christa Williams | Softball | Women's tournament | July 30 |
| Gold | Kendall Cross | Wrestling | Freestyle –57 kg | July 30 |
| Gold | Kurt Angle | Wrestling | Freestyle –100 kg | July 30 |
| Gold | United States women's national soccer team: Michelle Akers; Thori Staples Bryan; Brandi Chastain; Amanda Cromwell; Joy Fawcett; Julie Foudy; Carin Gabarra; Mia Hamm; Mary Harvey; Kristine Lilly; Shannon MacMillan; Tiffeny Milbrett; Carla Overbeck; Cindy Parlow; Tiffany Roberts; Briana Scurry; Tisha Venturini; Saskia Webber; Staci Wilson | Soccer | Women's tournament | July 31 |
| Gold | Justin Huish | Archery | Men's individual | August 1 |
| Gold | Michael Johnson | Athletics | Men's 200 meters | August 1 |
| Gold | Derrick Adkins | Athletics | Men's 400 meter hurdles | August 1 |
| Gold | Dan O'Brien | Athletics | Men's decathlon | August 1 |
| Gold | Tom Brands | Wrestling | Freestyle –62 kg | August 1 |
| Gold | Justin Huish; Richard Johnson; Rod White | Archery | Men's team | August 2 |
| Gold | Suzannah Bianco; Tammy Cleland; Becky Dyroen-Lancer; Emily LeSueur; Heather Pease; Jill Savery; Nathalie Schneyder; Heather Simmons-Carrasco; Jill Sudduth; Margot Thien | Synchronized swimming | Team | August 2 |
| Gold | Lindsay Davenport | Tennis | Women's singles | August 2 |
| Gold | Alvin Harrison; Anthuan Maybank; Derek Mills; Jason Rouser^{[a]} LaMont Smith | Athletics | Men's 4 × 400 meter relay | August 3 |
| Gold | Gail Devers; Chryste Gaines; Carlette Guidry^{[a]} Inger Miller; Gwen Torrence | Athletics | Women's 4 × 100 meter relay | August 3 |
| Gold | Kim Graham; Maicel Malone; Jearl Miles; Rochelle Stevens; Linetta Wilson^{[a]} | Athletics | Women's 4 × 400 meter relay | August 3 |
| Gold | United States men's national basketball team: Charles Barkley; Penny Hardaway; Grant Hill; Karl Malone; Reggie Miller; Hakeem Olajuwon; Shaquille O'Neal; Gary Payton; Scottie Pippen; Mitch Richmond; David Robinson; John Stockton | Basketball | Men's tournament | August 3 |
| Gold | Andre Agassi | Tennis | Men's singles | August 3 |
| Gold | Gigi Fernández; Mary Joe Fernández | Tennis | Women's doubles | August 3 |
| Gold | United States women's national basketball team: Jennifer Azzi; Ruthie Bolton; Teresa Edwards; Venus Lacy; Lisa Leslie; Rebecca Lobo; Katrina McClain; Nikki McCray; Carla McGhee; Dawn Staley; Katy Steding; Sheryl Swoopes | Basketball | Women's tournament | August 4 |
| Gold | David Reid | Boxing | Light middleweight | August 4 |
| Silver | Jeremy Linn | Swimming | Men's 100 meter breaststroke | July 20 |
| Silver | Allison Wagner | Swimming | Women's 400 meter individual medley | July 20 |
| Silver | Dennis Hall | Wrestling | Greco-Roman –57 kg | July 20 |
| Silver | Josh Lakatos | Shooting | Men's trap | July 21 |
| Silver | Eric Namesnik | Swimming | Men's 400 meter individual medley | July 21 |
| Silver | Amanda Beard | Swimming | Women's 100 meter breaststroke | July 21 |
| Silver | Gary Hall Jr. | Swimming | Men's 100 meter freestyle | July 22 |
| Silver | Tom Malchow | Swimming | Men's 200 meter butterfly | July 22 |
| Silver | Whitney Hedgepeth | Swimming | Women's 100 meter backstroke | July 22 |
| Silver | Brandon Paulson | Wrestling | Greco-Roman –52 kg | July 22 |
| Silver | Matt Ghaffari | Wrestling | Greco-Roman –130 kg | July 22 |
| Silver | Amanda Beard | Swimming | Women's 200 meter breaststroke | July 23 |
| Silver | Erin Hartwell | Cycling | Men's 1000 meter time trial | July 24 |
| Silver | Bruce Davidson; Jill Henneberg; David O'Connor; Karen O'Connor | Equestrian | Team eventing | July 24 |
| Silver | Gary Hall Jr. | Swimming | Men's 50 meter freestyle | July 25 |
| Silver | Whitney Hedgepeth | Swimming | Women's 200 meter backstroke | July 25 |
| Silver | John Godina | Athletics | Men's shot put | July 26 |
| Silver | Tripp Schwenk | Swimming | Men's 200 meter backstroke | July 26 |
| Silver | Dana Chladek | Canoeing | Women's slalom K-1 | July 27 |
| Silver | Karen Kraft; Missy Schwen | Rowing | Women's pair | July 27 |
| Silver | Lance Deal | Athletics | Men's hammer throw | July 28 |
| Silver | Marty Nothstein | Cycling | Men's sprint | July 28 |
| Silver | Amy Chow | Gymnastics | Women's uneven bars | July 28 |
| Silver | Teresa Bell; Lindsay Burns | Rowing | Women's lightweight double sculls | July 28 |
| Silver | Mike Dodd; Mike Whitmarsh | Volleyball | Men's beach volleyball | July 28 |
| Silver | Mark Crear | Athletics | Men's 110 meter hurdles | July 29 |
| Silver | Jair Lynch | Gymnastics | Men's parallel bars | July 29 |
| Silver | Jason Gailes; Brian Jamieson; Eric Mueller; Tim Young | Rowing | Men's quadruple sculls | July 29 |
| Silver | Townsend Saunders | Wrestling | Freestyle –68 kg | July 30 |
| Silver | Kim Batten | Athletics | Women's 400 meter hurdles | July 31 |
| Silver | Leslie Burr; Anne Kursinski; Peter Leone; Michael Matz | Equestrian | Team jumping | August 1 |
| Silver | Jon Drummond; Tim Harden; Michael Marsh; Dennis Mitchell; Tim Montgomery^{[a]} | Athletics | Men's 4 × 100 meter relay | August 3 |
| Bronze | Angel Martino | Swimming | Women's 100 meter freestyle | July 20 |
| Bronze | Lance Bade | Shooting | Men's trap | July 21 |
| Bronze | Angel Martino | Swimming | Women's 100 meter butterfly | July 21 |
| Bronze | Jimmy Pedro | Judo | Men's –71 kg | July 24 |
| Bronze | Kerry Milliken | Equestrian | Individual eventing | July 26 |
| Bronze | Gwen Torrence | Athletics | Women's 100 meters | July 27 |
| Bronze | Mary Ellen Clark | Diving | Women's 10 meter platform | July 27 |
| Bronze | Robert Dover; Michelle Gibson; Steffen Peters; Guenter Seidel | Equestrian | Team dressage | July 27 |
| Bronze | William Carlucci; David Collins; Jeff Pfaendtner; Marc Schneider | Rowing | Men's lightweight four | July 28 |
| Bronze | Joe Greene | Athletics | Men's long jump | July 29 |
| Bronze | Mark Lenzi | Diving | Men's 3 meter springboard | July 29 |
| Bronze | Dominique Dawes | Gymnastics | Women's floor | July 29 |
| Bronze | Susan DeMattei | Cycling | Women's cross-country | July 30 |
| Bronze | Tonja Buford-Bailey | Athletics | Women's 400 meter hurdles | July 31 |
| Bronze | Calvin Davis | Athletics | Men's 400 meter hurdles | August 1 |
| Bronze | Bruce Baumgartner | Wrestling | Freestyle –130 kg | August 1 |
| Bronze | Jackie Joyner-Kersee | Athletics | Women's long jump | August 2 |
| Bronze | United States men's national baseball team: Chad Allen; Kris Benson; R. A. Dickey; Troy Glaus; Chad Green; Seth Greisinger; Kip Harkrider; A. J. Hinch; Jacque Jones; Billy Koch; Mark Kotsay; Matt Lecroy; Travis Lee; Braden Looper; Brian Loyd; Warren Morris; Augie Ojeda; Jim Parque; Jeff Weaver; Jason Williams | Baseball | Men's tournament | August 2 |
| Bronze | Courtenay Becker-Day | Sailing | Women's Europe | August 2 |
| Bronze | Jim Barton; Jeff Madrigali; Kent Massey | Sailing | Soling | August 2 |
| Bronze | Floyd Mayweather Jr. | Boxing | Featherweight | August 4 |
| Bronze | Terrance Cauthen | Boxing | Lightweight | August 4 |
| Bronze | Rhoshii Wells | Boxing | Middleweight | August 4 |
| Bronze | Antonio Tarver | Boxing | Light heavyweight | August 4 |
| Bronze | Nate Jones | Boxing | Heavyweight | August 4 |

Medals by sport
| Sport | 1st place, gold medalist(s) | 2nd place, silver medalist(s) | 3rd place, bronze medalist(s) | Total |
| Swimming | 13 | 11 | 2 | **26** |
| Athletics | 13 | 5 | 5 | **23** |
| Wrestling | 3 | 4 | 1 | **8** |
| Tennis | 3 | 0 | 0 | **3** |
| Gymnastics | 2 | 2 | 1 | **5** |
| Archery | 2 | 0 | 0 | **2** |
| Basketball | 2 | 0 | 0 | **2** |
| Shooting | 1 | 1 | 1 | **3** |
| Volleyball | 1 | 1 | 0 | **2** |
| Boxing | 1 | 0 | 5 | **6** |
| Soccer | 1 | 0 | 0 | **1** |
| Softball | 1 | 0 | 0 | **1** |
| Synchronized swimming | 1 | 0 | 0 | **1** |
| Rowing | 0 | 3 | 1 | **4** |
| Equestrian | 0 | 2 | 2 | **4** |
| Cycling | 0 | 2 | 1 | **3** |
| Canoeing | 0 | 1 | 0 | **1** |
| Diving | 0 | 0 | 2 | **2** |
| Sailing | 0 | 0 | 2 | **2** |
| Baseball | 0 | 0 | 1 | **1** |
| Judo | 0 | 0 | 1 | **1** |
| Total | 44 | 32 | 25 | 101 |

Medals by day
| Day | Date | 1st place, gold medalist(s) | 2nd place, silver medalist(s) | 3rd place, bronze medalist(s) | Total |
| 1 | July 20 | 0 | 3 | 1 | **4** |
| 2 | July 21 | 3 | 3 | 2 | **8** |
| 3 | July 22 | 2 | 5 | 0 | **7** |
| 4 | July 23 | 4 | 1 | 0 | **5** |
| 5 | July 24 | 1 | 2 | 1 | **4** |
| 6 | July 25 | 2 | 2 | 0 | **4** |
| 7 | July 26 | 4 | 2 | 1 | **7** |
| 8 | July 27 | 2 | 2 | 3 | **7** |
| 9 | July 28 | 2 | 5 | 1 | **8** |
| 10 | July 29 | 4 | 3 | 3 | **10** |
| 11 | July 30 | 3 | 1 | 1 | **5** |
| 12 | July 31 | 1 | 1 | 1 | **3** |
| 13 | August 1 | 5 | 1 | 2 | **8** |
| 14 | August 2 | 3 | 0 | 4 | **7** |
| 15 | August 3 | 6 | 1 | 0 | **7** |
| 16 | August 4 | 2 | 0 | 5 | **7** |
| Total | | 44 | 32 | 25 | 101 |

Medals by gender
| Gender | 1st place, gold medalist(s) | 2nd place, silver medalist(s) | 3rd place, bronze medalist(s) | Total | Percentage |
| Male | 25 | 20 | 14 | **59** | 58.4% |
| Female | 19 | 10 | 10 | **39** | 38.6% |
| Mixed | 0 | 2 | 1 | **3** | 3.0% |
| Total | 44 | 32 | 25 | 101 | 100% |

Multiple medalists
| Name | Sport | 1st place, gold medalist(s) | 2nd place, silver medalist(s) | 3rd place, bronze medalist(s) | Total |
| Amy Van Dyken | Swimming | 4 | 0 | 0 | **4** |
| Gary Hall Jr. | Swimming | 2 | 2 | 0 | **4** |
| Angel Martino | Swimming | 2 | 0 | 2 | **4** |
| Josh Davis | Swimming | 3 | 0 | 0 | **3** |
| Jenny Thompson | Swimming | 3 | 0 | 0 | **3** |
| Amanda Beard | Swimming | 1 | 2 | 0 | **3** |
| Whitney Hedgepeth | Swimming | 1 | 2 | 0 | **3** |
| Beth Botsford | Swimming | 2 | 0 | 0 | **2** |
| Gail Devers | Athletics | 2 | 0 | 0 | **2** |
| Catherine Fox | Swimming | 2 | 0 | 0 | **2** |
| Justin Huish | Archery | 2 | 0 | 0 | **2** |
| Lisa Jacob | Swimming | 2 | 0 | 0 | **2** |
| Michael Johnson | Athletics | 2 | 0 | 0 | **2** |
| Shannon Miller | Gymnastics | 2 | 0 | 0 | **2** |
| Jon Olsen | Swimming | 2 | 0 | 0 | **2** |
| Jeff Rouse | Swimming | 2 | 0 | 0 | **2** |
| Brad Schumacher | Swimming | 2 | 0 | 0 | **2** |
| Amy Chow | Gymnastics | 1 | 1 | 0 | **2** |
| Tripp Schwenk | Swimming | 1 | 1 | 0 | **2** |
| Dominique Dawes | Gymnastics | 1 | 0 | 1 | **2** |
| Gwen Torrence | Athletics | 1 | 0 | 1 | **2** |

^{a} – Indicates that the athlete competed in preliminaries but not the final.

== Competitors ==
The following is the list of number of competitors in the Games.

| Sport | Men | Women | Total |
|---|---|---|---|
| Archery | 3 | 3 | 6 |
| Athletics | 67 | 54 | 121 |
| Badminton | 1 | 2 | 3 |
| Baseball | 20 | – | 20 |
| Basketball | 12 | 12 | 24 |
| Boxing | 12 | – | 12 |
| Canoeing | 18 | 7 | 25 |
| Cycling | 16 | 7 | 23 |
| Diving | 4 | 4 | 8 |
| Equestrian | 7 | 7 | 14 |
| Fencing | 9 | 6 | 15 |
| Field hockey | 16 | 16 | 32 |
| Football | 15 | 15 | 30 |
| Gymnastics | 6 | 13 | 19 |
| Handball | 16 | 16 | 32 |
| Judo | 7 | 7 | 14 |
| Modern pentathlon | 1 | – | 1 |
| Rowing | 26 | 20 | 46 |
| Sailing | 12 | 4 | 16 |
| Shooting | 16 | 9 | 25 |
| Softball | – | 15 | 15 |
| Swimming | 24 | 21 | 45 |
| Synchronized swimming | – | 10 | 10 |
| Table tennis | 3 | 3 | 6 |
| Tennis | 3 | 4 | 7 |
| Volleyball | 17 | 18 | 35 |
| Water polo | 13 | – | 13 |
| Weightlifting | 10 | – | 10 |
| Wrestling | 20 | – | 20 |
| Total | 375 | 273 | 648 |

== Archery ==
The United States claimed both of the gold medals in the men's archery competitions, with Justin Huish claiming the individual medal and the three-man team claiming the team medal. The American women were not as successful.

Men

| Athlete | Event | Ranking round | | Round of 64 | Round of 32 | Round of 16 | Quarterfinal | Semifinal | Final / BM | |
| Athlete | Event | Score | Seed | Opposition Score | Opposition Score | Opposition Score | Opposition Score | Opposition Score | Opposition Score | Rank |
|---|---|---|---|---|---|---|---|---|---|---|
| Justin Huish | Individual | 670 | 9 | Martynov (KAZ); W 165–157 | Hardinges (GBR); W 166–155 | Hsieh (TPE); W 169–162 | Frangilli (ITA); W 112(+10)–112(+9) | Vermeiren (BEL); W 112–103 | Petersson (SWE); W 112–107 | 1st place, gold medalist(s) |
| Richard Johnson | Individual | 664 | 15 | Krumpestar (SLO); W 158–140 | Gray (AUS); W 164–157 | Jang (KOR); L 160–162 | Did not advance | | | 11 |
| Rod White | Individual | 666 | 24 | Badënov (RUS); W 161–152 | Vermeiren (BEL); L 158–159 | Did not advance | | | | 24 |
| Justin Huish; Richard Johnson; Rod White | Team | 2000 | 3 | —N/a | | India; W 251–235 | Ukraine; W 251–240 | Italy; W 251–247 | South Korea; W 251–249 | 1st place, gold medalist(s) |

Women

| Athlete | Event | Ranking round | | Round of 64 | Round of 32 | Round of 16 | Quarterfinal | Semifinal | Final / BM | |
| Athlete | Event | Score | Seed | Opposition Score | Opposition Score | Opposition Score | Opposition Score | Opposition Score | Opposition Score | Rank |
|---|---|---|---|---|---|---|---|---|---|---|
| Judi Adams | Individual | 606 | 53 | Nowicka (POL); L 152–165 | Did not advance | | | | | 39 |
| Janet Dykman | Individual | 646 | 17 | Backman (SWE); W 156–144 | Yang (CHN); W 154–148 | Wang (CHN); L 149–156 | Did not advance | | | 16 |
| Lindsay Langston | Individual | 643 | 21 | Yang (TPE); W 151–150 | Nowicka (POL); L 152(+8)–152(+9) | Did not advance | | | | 22 |
| Judi Adams; Janet Dykman; Lindsay Langston | Team | 1859 | 10 | —N/a | | Kazakhstan; L 226–235 | Did not advance | | | 13 |

== Athletics ==
Key
- Note–Ranks given for track events are within the athlete's heat only
- Q = Qualified for the next round
- q = Qualified for the next round as a fastest loser or, in field events, by position without achieving the qualifying target

Men
Track & road events

| Athlete | Event | Heat | | Quarterfinal | | Semifinal | | Final | |
| Athlete | Event | Time | Rank | Time | Rank | Time | Rank | Time | Rank |
|---|---|---|---|---|---|---|---|---|---|
| Jon Drummond | 100 m | 10.08 | 2 Q | 10.17 | 3 Q | 10.16 | 6 | Did not advance | |
| Michael Marsh | 100 m | 10.14 | 1 Q | 10.04 | 1 Q | 10.08 | 3 Q | 10.00 | 5 |
| Dennis Mitchell | 100 m | 10.24 | 1 Q | 10.09 | 1 Q | 10.00 | 2 Q | 9.99 | 4 |
| Michael Johnson | 200 m | 20.55 | 1 Q | 20.37 | 1 Q | 20.27 | 1 Q | 19.32 WR | 1st place, gold medalist(s) |
| Michael Marsh | 200 m | 20.27 | 1 Q | 20.39 | 1 Q | 20.26 | 3 Q | 20.48 | 8 |
| Jeff Williams | 200 m | 20.37 | 1 Q | 20.47 | 2 Q | 20.39 | 3 Q | 20.17 | 5 |
| Alvin Harrison | 400 m | 44.69 | 1 Q | 44.79 | 1 Q | 45.04 | 4 Q | 44.62 | 4 |
| Michael Johnson | 400 m | 45.80 | 2 Q | 44.62 | 1 Q | 44.59 | 1 Q | 43.49 OR | 1st place, gold medalist(s) |
| Butch Reynolds | 400 m | 45.42 | 1 Q | 45.21 | 3 Q | DNF | | Did not advance | |
| Johnny Gray | 800 m | 1:45.87 | 1 Q | —N/a | | 1:44.00 | 2 Q | 1:44.21 | 7 |
| José Parrilla | 800 m | 1:49.99 | 6 | —N/a | | Did not advance | | | |
| Brandon Rock | 800 m | 1:48.47 | 4 | —N/a | | Did not advance | | | |
| Brian Hyde | 1500 m | 3:48.20 | 9 | —N/a | | Did not advance | | | |
| Paul McMullen | 1500 m | 3:39.94 | 2 Q | —N/a | | 3:37.81 | 9 | Did not advance | |
| Jason Pyrah | 1500 m | 3:39.91 | 9 | —N/a | | Did not advance | | | |
| Matt Giusto | 5000 m | 14:30.76 | 9 | —N/a | | Did not advance | | | |
| Bob Kennedy | 5000 m | 13:54.57 | 4 Q | —N/a | | 13:27.90 | 4 Q | 13:12.25 | 6 |
| Jim Spivey | 5000 m | 13:54.01 | 9 q | —N/a | | 14:27.72 | 13 | Did not advance | |
| Brad Barquist | 10,000 m | 29:11.20 | 16 | —N/a | | | | Did not advance | |
| Dan Middleman | 10,000 m | 29:50.72 | 17 | —N/a | | | | Did not advance | |
| Todd Williams | 10,000 m | DNF | | —N/a | | | | Did not advance | |
| Mark Crear | 110 m hurdles | 13.44 | 1 Q | 13.14 | 1 Q | 13.22 | 3 Q | 13.09 | 2nd place, silver medalist(s) |
| Allen Johnson | 110 m hurdles | 13.66 | 1 Q | 13.27 | 1 Q | 13.10 | 1 Q | 12.95 OR | 1st place, gold medalist(s) |
| Eugene Swift | 110 m hurdles | 13.36 | 1 Q | 13.37 | 1 Q | 13.21 | 2 Q | 13.23 | 6 |
| Derrick Adkins | 400 m hurdles | 48.46 | 1 Q | —N/a | | 47.76 | 1 Q | 47.54 | 1st place, gold medalist(s) |
| Bryan Bronson | 400 m hurdles | 49.06 | 1 Q | —N/a | | 50.32 | 8 | Did not advance | |
| Calvin Davis | 400 m hurdles | 48.94 | 1 Q | —N/a | | 47.91 | 1 Q | 47.96 | 3rd place, bronze medalist(s) |
| Mark Croghan | 3000 m steeplechase | 8:27.91 | 3 Q | —N/a | | 8:21.01 | 6 q | 8:17.84 | 5 |
| Marc Davis | 3000 m steeplechase | 8:31.25 | 5 Q | —N/a | | 8:26.76 | 1 Q | 9:51.96 | 12 |
| Robert Gary | 3000 m steeplechase | 8:49.68 | 11 | —N/a | | Did not advance | | | |
| Jon Drummond; Tim Harden; Michael Marsh; Dennis Mitchell; Tim Montgomery^{[b]} | 4 × 100 m relay | 38.58 | 1 Q | —N/a | | 37.96 | 1 Q | 38.05 | 2nd place, silver medalist(s) |
| Alvin Harrison; Anthuan Maybank; Derek Mills; Jason Rouser^{[b]} LaMont Smith | 4 × 400 m relay | 3:00.59 | 1 Q | —N/a | | 2:57.86 | 1 Q | 2:55.99 | 1st place, gold medalist(s) |
| Keith Brantly | Marathon | —N/a | | | | | | 2:18:17 | 28 |
| Mark Coogan | Marathon | —N/a | | | | | | 2:20:27 | 41 |
| Bob Kempainen | Marathon | —N/a | | | | | | 2:18:38 | 31 |
| Curt Clausen | 20 km walk | —N/a | | | | | | 1:31:30 | 50 |
| Andrzej Chylinski | 50 km walk | —N/a | | | | | | 4:03:13 | 26 |
| Allen James | 50 km walk | —N/a | | | | | | 4:01:18 | 24 |
| Herman Nelson | 50 km walk | —N/a | | | | | | DSQ | |

Field events

| Athlete | Event | Qualification | | Final | |
| Athlete | Event | Result | Rank | Result | Rank |
|---|---|---|---|---|---|
| Joe Greene | Long jump | 8.28 | 2 Q | 8.24 | 3rd place, bronze medalist(s) |
| Carl Lewis | Long jump | 8.29 | 1 Q | 8.50 | 1st place, gold medalist(s) |
| Mike Powell | Long jump | 8.20 | 4 Q | 8.17 | 5 |
| Mike Conley | Triple jump | 17.20 | 2 Q | 17.40 | 4 |
| Kenny Harrison | Triple jump | 17.58 | 1 Q | 18.09 OR | 1st place, gold medalist(s) |
| Robert Howard | Triple jump | 16.92 | 7 q | 16.90 | 8 |
| Charles Austin | High jump | 2.28 | =1 Q | 2.39 OR | 1st place, gold medalist(s) |
| Ed Broxterman | High jump | 2.15 | 31 | Did not advance | |
| Cameron Wright | High jump | 2.20 | 26 | Did not advance | |
| Jeff Hartwig | Pole vault | 5.70 | 5 Q | 5.60 | 11 |
| Scott Huffman | Pole vault | 5.60 | =12 q | 5.60 | 13 |
| Lawrence Johnson | Pole vault | 5.70 | 11 Q | 5.70 | 8 |
| Randy Barnes | Shot put | 20.42 | 4 Q | 21.62 | 1st place, gold medalist(s) |
| John Godina | Shot put | 20.54 | 2 Q | 20.79 | 2nd place, silver medalist(s) |
| C. J. Hunter | Shot put | 19.95 | 6 Q | 20.39 | 7 |
| John Godina | Discus throw | 61.82 | 14 | Did not advance | |
| Adam Setliff | Discus throw | 62.36 | 10 q | 56.30 | 12 |
| Anthony Washington | Discus throw | 63.66 | 3 Q | 65.42 | 4 |
| Tom Pukstys | Javelin throw | 84.70 | 4 Q | 83.58 | 8 |
| Todd Riech | Javelin throw | 78.02 | 17 | Did not advance | |
| Dave Stephens | Javelin throw | 79.78 | 14 | Did not advance | |
| Lance Deal | Hammer throw | 78.59 | 1 Q | 81.12 | 2nd place, silver medalist(s) |
| Kevin McMahon | Hammer throw | 73.46 | 24 | Did not advance | |
| Ken Popejoy | Hammer throw | 72.46 | 29 | Did not advance | |

Combined events – Decathlon

| Athlete | Event | 100 m | LJ | SP | HJ | 400 m | 110H | DT | PV | JT | 1500 m | Points | Rank |
|---|---|---|---|---|---|---|---|---|---|---|---|---|---|
| Steve Fritz | Result | 10.90 | 7.77 | 15.31 | 2.04 | 50.13 | 13.97 | 49.84 | 5.10 | 65.70 | 4:38.26 | 8644 | 4 |
| Steve Fritz | Points | 883 | 1002 | 809 | 840 | 809 | 978 | 867 | 941 | 824 | 691 | 8644 | 4 |
| Chris Huffins | Result | 10.47 | 7.49 | 15.57 | 2.04 | 48.83 | 14.10 | 48.72 | 4.70 | 60.62 | 5:14.36 | 8300 | 10 |
| Chris Huffins | Points | 982 | 932 | 825 | 840 | 869 | 962 | 844 | 819 | 747 | 480 | 8300 | 10 |
| Dan O'Brien | Result | 10.50 | 7.57 | 15.66 | 2.07 | 46.82 | 13.87 | 48.78 | 5.00 | 66.90 | 4:45.89 | 8824 | 1st place, gold medalist(s) |
| Dan O'Brien | Points | 975 | 952 | 830 | 868 | 967 | 991 | 845 | 910 | 842 | 644 | 8824 | 1st place, gold medalist(s) |

Women
Track & road events

| Athlete | Event | Heat | | Quarterfinal | | Semifinal | | Final | |
| Athlete | Event | Time | Rank | Time | Rank | Time | Rank | Time | Rank |
|---|---|---|---|---|---|---|---|---|---|
| Gail Devers | 100 m | 10.92 | 1 Q | 10.94 | 1 Q | 11.00 | 1 Q | 10.94 | 1st place, gold medalist(s) |
| D'Andre Hill | 100 m | 11.11 | 2 Q | 11.21 | 3 Q | 11.20 | 6 | Did not advance | |
| Gwen Torrence | 100 m | 11.11 | 1 Q | 11.11 | 1 Q | 10.997 | 2 Q | 10.96 | 3rd place, bronze medalist(s) |
| Carlette Guidry | 200 m | 22.37 | 1 Q | 22.51 | 1 Q | 22.56 | 4 Q | 22.61 | 8 |
| Inger Miller | 200 m | 22.74 | 2 Q | 22.57 | 3 Q | 22.33 | 4 Q | 22.41 | 4 |
| Dannette Young | 200 m | 22.65 | 1 Q | 22.53 | 1 Q | 22.49 | 5 | Did not advance | |
| Kim Graham | 400 m | 51.70 | 1 Q | 50.96 | 3 Q | 51.13 | 5 | Did not advance | |
| Maicel Malone | 400 m | 51.28 | 1 Q | 51.16 | 1 Q | 51.16 | 6 | Did not advance | |
| Jearl Miles | 400 m | 51.96 | 1 Q | 50.84 | 2 Q | 50.21 | 4 Q | 49.55 | 5 |
| Joetta Clark | 800 m | 2:00.38 | 3 | —N/a | | Did not advance | | | |
| Suzy Favor-Hamilton | 800 m | 2:00.47 | 4 | —N/a | | Did not advance | | | |
| Meredith Rainey | 800 m | 1:59.96 | 4 q | —N/a | | 1:59.36 | 7 | Did not advance | |
| Juli Henner | 1500 m | 4:27.14 | 10 | —N/a | | Did not advance | | | |
| Vicki Huber | 1500 m | 4:18.82 | 9 | —N/a | | Did not advance | | | |
| Regina Jacobs | 1500 m | 4:04.41 | 3 Q | —N/a | | 4:06.13 | 2 Q | 4:07.21 | 10 |
| Lynn Jennings | 5000 m | 15:19.66 | 3 Q | —N/a | | | | 15:17.50 | 9 |
| Amy Rudolph | 5000 m | 15:21.90 | 3 Q | —N/a | | | | 15:19.77 | 10 |
| Mary Decker | 5000 m | DSQ | | —N/a | | | | DSQ | |
| Olga Appell | 10,000 m | 34:12.54 | 17 | —N/a | | | | Did not advance | |
| Kate Fonshell | 10,000 m | 32:48.05 | 9 | —N/a | | | | Did not advance | |
| Joan Nesbit | 10,000 m | 32:33.48 | 13 | —N/a | | | | Did not advance | |
| Gail Devers | 100 m hurdles | 12.73 | 1 Q | 12.83 | 1 Q | 12.62 | 3 Q | 12.66 | 4 |
| Cheryl Dickey | 100 m hurdles | 12.92 | 2 Q | 12.92 | 5 | Did not advance | | | |
| Lynda Goode | 100 m hurdles | 12.97 | 3 Q | 12.78 | 4 Q | 12.77 | 3 Q | 13.11 | 7 |
| Kim Batten | 400 m hurdles | 54.92 | 1 Q | —N/a | | 53.65 | 1 Q | 53.08 | 2nd place, silver medalist(s) |
| Tonja Buford-Bailey | 400 m hurdles | 55.23 | 1 Q | —N/a | | 53.38 | 2 Q | 53.22 | 3rd place, bronze medalist(s) |
| Sandra Farmer-Patrick | 400 m hurdles | DSQ | | —N/a | | DSQ | | | |
| Gail Devers; Chryste Gaines; Carlette Guidry^{[b]} Inger Miller; Gwen Torrence | 4 × 100 m relay | 42.49 | 1 Q | —N/a | | | | 41.95 | 1st place, gold medalist(s) |
| Kim Graham; Maicel Malone; Jearl Miles; Rochelle Stevens; Linetta Wilson^{[b]} | 4 × 400 m relay | 3:22.71 | 1 Q | —N/a | | | | 3:20.91 | 1st place, gold medalist(s) |
| Anne Marie Lauck | Marathon | —N/a | | | | | | 2:31:30 | 10 |
| Linda Somers | Marathon | —N/a | | | | | | 2:36:58 | 31 |
| Jenny Spangler | Marathon | —N/a | | | | | | DNF | |
| Victoria Herazo | 10 km walk | —N/a | | | | | | DSQ | |
| Debbi Lawrence | 10 km walk | —N/a | | | | | | 45:32 | 20 |
| Michelle Rohl | 10 km walk | —N/a | | | | | | 44:29 | 14 |

^{b} – Athlete ran in a preliminary round but not the final.

Field events

| Athlete | Event | Qualifying | | Final | |
| Athlete | Event | Result | Rank | Result | Rank |
|---|---|---|---|---|---|
| Jackie Joyner-Kersee | Long jump | 6.70 | =6 Q | 7.00 | 3rd place, bronze medalist(s) |
| Marieke Veltman | Long jump | 6.49 | 16 | Did not advance | |
| Shana Williams | Long jump | NM | | Did not advance | |
| Sheila Hudson | Triple jump | 14.26 | 9 Q | 14.02 | 10 |
| Diana Orrange | Triple jump | NM | | Did not advance | |
| Cynthea Rhodes | Triple jump | 13.95 | 16 | Did not advance | |
| Amy Acuff | High jump | 1.85 | =24 | Did not advance | |
| Connie Teaberry | High jump | 1.90 | 18 | Did not advance | |
| Tisha Waller | High jump | 1.93 | =1 q | 1.93 | =9 |
| Valeyta Althouse | Shot put | 18.16 | 16 | Did not advance | |
| Ramona Pagel | Shot put | 18.55 | 12 q | 18.48 | 9 |
| Connie Price-Smith | Shot put | 19.08 | 5 Q | 19.22 | 5 |
| Lacy Barnes-Mileham | Discus throw | 57.48 | 30 | Did not advance | |
| Aretha Hill | Discus throw | 56.04 | 34 | Did not advance | |
| Suzy Powell | Discus throw | 56.24 | 33 | Did not advance | |
| Nicole Carroll | Javelin throw | 54.74 | 26 | Did not advance | |
| Erica Wheeler | Javelin throw | 53.34 | 30 | Did not advance | |

Combined events – Heptathlon

| Athlete | Event | 100H | HJ | SP | 200 m | LJ | JT | 800 m | Points | Rank |
|---|---|---|---|---|---|---|---|---|---|---|
| Kelly Blair | Result | 13.62 | 1.80 | 12.29 | 24.49 | 6.32 | 50.32 | 2:16.87 | 6307 | 8 |
| Kelly Blair | Points | 1033 | 978 | 680 | 934 | 949 | 866 | 867 | 6307 | 8 |
| Sharon Hanson | Result | 13.34 | 1.77 | 13.45 | 24.42 | 5.96 | 46.98 | 2:11.67 | 6292 | 9 |
| Sharon Hanson | Points | 1074 | 941 | 757 | 941 | 837 | 802 | 940 | 6292 | 9 |
| Jackie Joyner-Kersee | Result | 13.24 | WD | | | | | | DNF | |
| Jackie Joyner-Kersee | Points | 1089 | WD | | | | | | DNF | |

== Badminton ==
| Athlete | Event | Round of 64 | Round of 32 | Round of 16 | Quarterfinal | Semifinal | Final / BM | |
| Athlete | Event | Opposition Score | Opposition Score | Opposition Score | Opposition Score | Opposition Score | Opposition Score | Rank |
|---|---|---|---|---|---|---|---|---|
| Kevin Han | Men's singles | Knowles (GBR); L 15–2, 10–15, 7–15 | Did not advance | | | | | |
| Erika von Heiland | Women's singles | Jeng (TPE); L 2–11, 6–11 | Did not advance | | | | | |
| Linda French; Erika von Heiland | Women's doubles | —N/a | Stuer-Lauridsen / Thomsen (DEN); L 4–15, 1–15 | Did not advance | | | | |

== Baseball ==
Baseball was open only to male amateurs in 1992 and 1996. As a result, the Americans and other nations where professional baseball is developed relied on collegiate players, while Cubans used their most experienced veterans, who technically were considered amateurs as they nominally held other jobs, but in fact trained full-time. In 2000, pros were admitted, but the MLB refused to release its players in 2000, 2004, and 2008, and the situation changed only a little: the Cubans still used their best players, while the Americans started using minor leaguers. The IOC cited the absence of the best players as the main reason for baseball being dropped from the Olympic program.

Summary

| Team | Event | Round robin | | | | | | | | Semifinal | Final / BM | |
| Team | Event | Opposition Result | Opposition Result | Opposition Result | Opposition Result | Opposition Result | Opposition Result | Opposition Result | Rank | Opposition Result | Opposition Result | Rank |
|---|---|---|---|---|---|---|---|---|---|---|---|---|
| United States men | Men's tournament | Nicaragua; W 4–1 | South Korea; W 7–2 | Italy; W 15–3 (F/7) | Japan; W 15–5 (F/7) | Australia; W 15–5 (F/7) | Cuba; L 8–10 | Netherlands; W 17–1 (F/7) | 2 Q | Japan; L 2–11 | Bronze medal game Nicaragua; W 10–3 | 3rd place, bronze medalist(s) |

Roster

- R. A. Dickey
- Warren Morris
- Augie Ojeda
- Mark Kotsay
- Jason Williams
- Chad Allen
- Chad Green
- Kip Harkrider
- Braden Looper
- Travis Lee
- A. J. Hinch
- Jacque Jones
- Brian Loyd
- Troy Glaus
- Seth Greisinger
- Matt LeCroy
- Kris Benson
- Jim Parque
- Jeff Weaver
- Billy Koch

Round robin

| Pos | Team | Pld | W | L | RF | RA | RD | PCT | GB | Qualification |
|---|---|---|---|---|---|---|---|---|---|---|
| 1 | Cuba | 7 | 7 | 0 | 97 | 49 | +48 | 1.000 | — | Advance to knockout round |
| 2 | United States (H) | 7 | 6 | 1 | 81 | 27 | +54 | .857 | 1 | Advance to knockout round |
| 3 | Japan | 7 | 4 | 3 | 69 | 45 | +24 | .571 | 3 | Advance to knockout round |
| 4 | Nicaragua | 7 | 4 | 3 | 44 | 30 | +14 | .571 | 3 | Advance to knockout round |
| 5 | Netherlands | 7 | 2 | 5 | 32 | 76 | −44 | .286 | 5 | |
| 6 | Italy | 7 | 2 | 5 | 33 | 71 | −38 | .286 | 5 | |
| 7 | Australia | 7 | 2 | 5 | 47 | 86 | −39 | .286 | 5 | |
| 8 | South Korea | 7 | 1 | 6 | 40 | 59 | −19 | .143 | 6 | |

(H) Hosts

July 20, 1996 10:00 at Atlanta–Fulton County Stadium, Atlanta
| Team | 1 | 2 | 3 | 4 | 5 | 6 | 7 | 8 | 9 | R | H | E |
|---|---|---|---|---|---|---|---|---|---|---|---|---|
| United States | 0 | 0 | 0 | 0 | 2 | 2 | 0 | 0 | 0 | 4 | 6 | 0 |
| Nicaragua | 1 | 0 | 0 | 0 | 0 | 0 | 0 | 0 | 0 | 1 | 7 | 1 |

July 24, 1996 15:00 at Atlanta–Fulton County Stadium, Atlanta
| Team | 1 | 2 | 3 | 4 | 5 | 6 | 7 | 8 | 9 | R | H | E |
|---|---|---|---|---|---|---|---|---|---|---|---|---|
| United States | 6 | 0 | 5 | 2 | 0 | 2 | 0 | – | – | 15 | 11 | 0 |
| Italy | 3 | 0 | 0 | 0 | 0 | 0 | 0 | – | – | 3 | 6 | 2 |

July 26, 1996 20:00 at Atlanta–Fulton County Stadium, Atlanta
| Team | 1 | 2 | 3 | 4 | 5 | 6 | 7 | 8 | 9 | R | H | E |
|---|---|---|---|---|---|---|---|---|---|---|---|---|
| Australia | 1 | 2 | 2 | 0 | 0 | 0 | 0 | – | – | 5 | 9 | 1 |
| United States | 7 | 0 | 2 | 6 | 0 | 0 | – | – | – | 15 | 13 | 0 |

July 30, 1996 10:00 at Atlanta–Fulton County Stadium, Atlanta
| Team | 1 | 2 | 3 | 4 | 5 | 6 | 7 | 8 | 9 | R | H | E |
|---|---|---|---|---|---|---|---|---|---|---|---|---|
| United States | 5 | 0 | 2 | 2 | 1 | 4 | 3 | – | – | 17 | 18 | 1 |
| Netherlands | 0 | 0 | 0 | 1 | 0 | 0 | 0 | – | – | 1 | 3 | 3 |

July 22, 1996 20:00 at Atlanta–Fulton County Stadium, Atlanta
| Team | 1 | 2 | 3 | 4 | 5 | 6 | 7 | 8 | 9 | R | H | E |
|---|---|---|---|---|---|---|---|---|---|---|---|---|
| South Korea | 1 | 0 | 0 | 0 | 0 | 1 | 0 | 0 | 0 | 2 | 8 | 4 |
| United States | 1 | 0 | 0 | 3 | 1 | 0 | 1 | 1 | – | 7 | 10 | 3 |

July 25, 1996 20:00 at Atlanta–Fulton County Stadium, Atlanta
| Team | 1 | 2 | 3 | 4 | 5 | 6 | 7 | 8 | 9 | R | H | E |
|---|---|---|---|---|---|---|---|---|---|---|---|---|
| United States | 7 | 0 | 0 | 0 | 7 | 1 | 0 | – | – | 15 | 14 | 0 |
| Japan | 2 | 0 | 2 | 1 | 0 | 0 | 0 | – | – | 5 | 6 | 1 |

July 28, 1996 15:00 at Atlanta–Fulton County Stadium, Atlanta
| Team | 1 | 2 | 3 | 4 | 5 | 6 | 7 | 8 | 9 | R | H | E |
|---|---|---|---|---|---|---|---|---|---|---|---|---|
| Cuba | 4 | 0 | 0 | 0 | 0 | 6 | 0 | 0 | 0 | 10 | 13 | 0 |
| United States | 1 | 0 | 0 | 0 | 1 | 0 | 3 | 2 | 1 | 8 | 13 | 2 |

Semifinal

August 1, 1996 at Atlanta–Fulton County Stadium, Atlanta
| Team | 1 | 2 | 3 | 4 | 5 | 6 | 7 | 8 | 9 | R | H | E |
|---|---|---|---|---|---|---|---|---|---|---|---|---|
| Japan | 0 | 3 | 0 | 0 | 3 | 0 | 2 | 2 | 1 | 11 | 15 | 0 |
| United States | 0 | 0 | 0 | 0 | 0 | 2 | 0 | 0 | 0 | 2 | 6 | 1 |

Bronze medal game

August 2, 1996 at Atlanta–Fulton County Stadium, Atlanta
| Team | 1 | 2 | 3 | 4 | 5 | 6 | 7 | 8 | 9 | R | H | E |
|---|---|---|---|---|---|---|---|---|---|---|---|---|
| United States | 4 | 0 | 0 | 1 | 0 | 1 | 1 | 3 | 0 | 10 | 12 | 1 |
| Nicaragua | 3 | 0 | 0 | 0 | 0 | 0 | 0 | 0 | 0 | 3 | 3 | 2 |

== Basketball ==
Summary

| Team | Event | Group stage | | | | | | Quarterfinal | Semifinal | Final / BM | |
| Team | Event | Opposition Score | Opposition Score | Opposition Score | Opposition Score | Opposition Score | Rank | Opposition Score | Opposition Score | Opposition Score | Rank |
|---|---|---|---|---|---|---|---|---|---|---|---|
| United States men | Men's tournament | Argentina; W 96–68 | Angola; W 87–54 | Lithuania; W 104–82 | China; W 133–70 | Croatia; W 102–71 | 1 Q | Brazil; W 98–75 | Australia; W 101–73 | FR Yugoslavia; W 95–69 | 1st place, gold medalist(s) |
| United States women | Women's tournament | Cuba; W 101–84 | Ukraine; W 98–65 | Zaire; W 107–47 | Australia; W 96–79 | South Korea; W 105–64 | 1 Q | Japan; W 108–93 | Australia; W 93–71 | Brazil; W 111–87 | 1st place, gold medalist(s) |

=== Men's tournament ===
Roster

The following players represented the United States:

- Penny Hardaway
- Charles Barkley
- David Robinson
- Gary Payton
- Grant Hill
- Hakeem Olajuwon
- John Stockton
- Karl Malone
- Mitch Richmond
- Reggie Miller
- Scottie Pippen
- Shaquille O'Neal

Group play

| Pos | Team | Pld | W | L | PF | PA | PD | Pts | Qualification |
|---|---|---|---|---|---|---|---|---|---|
| 1 | United States (H) | 5 | 5 | 0 | 522 | 345 | +177 | 10 | Quarterfinals |
| 2 | Lithuania | 5 | 3 | 2 | 427 | 354 | +73 | 8 (Note: Head-to-head record: Lithuania 1–0 Croatia) | Quarterfinals |
| 3 | Croatia | 5 | 3 | 2 | 422 | 386 | +36 | 8 | Quarterfinals |
| 4 | China | 5 | 2 | 3 | 360 | 502 | −142 | 7 (Note: Head-to-head record: China 1–0 Argentina) | Quarterfinals |
| 5 | Argentina | 5 | 2 | 3 | 351 | 396 | −45 | 7 | 9th place playoff |
| 6 | Angola | 5 | 0 | 5 | 280 | 379 | −99 | 5 | 11th place playoff |

Source: FIBA archive
Rules for classification: 1) points; 2) head-to-head points; 3) head-to-head goal average; 4) head-to-head number of points scored.
(H) Hosts
Notes:

20 July 1996

Report

| United States | 96–68 | Argentina |
Scoring by half: 46–44, 50–24
| Pts: Robinson 18; Rebs: Robinson 7 Asts: Hill, Hardaway 5 | | Pts: Espil 27; Rebs: Nicola 4 Asts: Milanesio 7 |

Atlanta
Referees: Gennaro Colucci (ITA), Stylianos Koukoulekidis (GRE)

22 July 1996

Report

| Angola | 54–87 | United States |
Scoring by half: 31–44, 23–43
| Pts: Carvalho 16; Rebs: Dias 5 Asts: Avô 5 | | Pts: Malone 12; Rebs: Barkley 9 Asts: Barkley 7 |

Atlanta
Referees: Michael Butler (AUS), Tomislav Jovancic (YUG)

24 July 1996

Report

| Lithuania | 82–104 | United States |
Scoring by half: 42–50, 40–54
| Pts: Einikis 21; Rebs: Karnišovas, Einikis 7 Asts: Pačėsas 5 | | Pts: Barkley 16; Rebs: Barkley 5 Asts: Stockton, Payton 7 |

Atlanta
Referees: Wieslaw Zych (POL), Jose Reyes Ronfini (MEX)

26 July 1996

Report

| United States | 133–70 | China |
Scoring by half: 65–28, 68–42
| Pts: Pippen 24; Rebs: O'Neal 10; Asts: Hardaway 10 | | Pts: Liu 18; Rebs: Bateer 6 Asts: Li 5 |

Atlanta
Referees: Donald Cline (CAN), Hidetoshi Ishida (JPN)

28 July 1996

Report

| Croatia | 71–102 | United States |
Scoring by half: 38–57, 33–45
| Pts: Tabak 19; Rebs: Tabak 7 Asts: Kukoč 10 | | Pts: Richmond 16; Rebs: Barkley 12; Asts: Payton 7 |

Atlanta
Referees: Robert Barnett (AUS), Carl Jungebrand (FIN)

Quarterfinal

30 July 1996
22:00

Report

| United States | 98–75 | Brazil |
Scoring by half: 52–36, 46–39
| Pts: Hardaway 14; Rebs: O'Neal 11; Asts: Payton 7 | | Pts: Schmidt 26; Rebs: Janjao 10; Asts: Minuci 5 |

Atlanta
Referees: Pascal Noel Dorizon (FRA), Jose Lapaix Guance (DOM)

Semifinal

1 August 1996
22:00

Report

| United States | 101–73 | Australia |
Scoring by half: 51–41, 50–32
| Pts: Barkley 24; Rebs: Barkley 11; Asts: Pippen 5 | | Pts: Gaze 25; Rebs: Bradtke 11; Asts: Heal 5 |

Atlanta
Referees: Raul Chaves Sagel (ARG), Stylianos Koukoulekidis (GRE)

Gold medal game

3 August 1996
22:00

Report

| FR Yugoslavia | 69–95 | United States |
Scoring by half: 38–43, 31–52
| Pts: Paspalj 19; Rebs: Bodiroga, Đorđević 5 Asts: Đorđević 6 | | Pts: Robinson 28; Rebs: Robinson 7 Asts: Stockton 7 |

Atlanta
Referees: Miguel Betancor León (ESP), José Reyes Ronfini (MEX)

=== Women's tournament ===
Roster
The following players represented the United States:

- Teresa Edwards
- Ruthie Bolton-Holifield
- Sheryl Swoopes
- Lisa Leslie
- Katrina McClain
- Dawn Staley
- Jennifer Azzi
- Carla McGhee
- Katy Steding
- Rebecca Lobo
- Venus Lacy
- Nikki McCray

- Head coach: Tara VanDerveer

Group play

| Pos | Team | Pld | W | L | PF | PA | PD | Pts | Qualification |
|---|---|---|---|---|---|---|---|---|---|
| 1 | United States (H) | 5 | 5 | 0 | 507 | 339 | +168 | 10 | Quarterfinals |
| 2 | Ukraine | 5 | 3 | 2 | 354 | 358 | −4 | 8 (Note: Head-to-head record: Ukraine 1–0 Australia) | Quarterfinals |
| 3 | Australia | 5 | 3 | 2 | 369 | 319 | +50 | 8 | Quarterfinals |
| 4 | Cuba | 5 | 2 | 3 | 365 | 377 | −12 | 7 (Note: Head-to-head record: Cuba 1–0 South Korea) | Quarterfinals |
| 5 | South Korea | 5 | 2 | 3 | 347 | 389 | −42 | 7 | |
| 6 | Zaire | 5 | 0 | 5 | 287 | 447 | −160 | 5 | |

Source: FIBA archive
Rules for classification: 1) points; 2) head-to-head points; 3) head-to-head goal average; 4) head-to-head number of points scored.
(H) Hosts
Notes:

21 July 1996

Boxscore

| United States | 101–84 | Cuba |
| Pts: Leslie 24; Rebs: Leslie 7 Asts: Edwards 9 | | Pts: Martínez 21; Rebs: Víctores 8 Asts: Lagnó 6 |

Morehouse College Gymnasium, Atlanta

23 July 1996

Boxscore

| Ukraine | 65–98 | United States |
| Pts: Nazarenko 14; Rebs: Shliakhova 5 Asts: four players 2 | | Pts: Bolton 21; Rebs: Leslie 9 Asts: Swoopes 7 |

Morehouse College Gymnasium, Atlanta

25 July 1996

Boxscore

| United States | 107–47 | Zaire |
| Pts: Azzi 18; Rebs: McCray 8 Asts: Edwards 5 | | Pts: Ngalula 17; Rebs: Tshijuka, Lobela 5 Asts: Mabika 3 |

Morehouse College Gymnasium, Atlanta

27 July 1996

Boxscore

| Australia | 79–96 | United States |
| Pts: Timms 26; Rebs: Sporn 7 Asts: Maher 3 | | Pts: McClain 24; Rebs: McClain 11; Asts: Edwards 15 |

Morehouse College Gymnasium, Atlanta

29 July 1996

Boxscore

| South Korea | 64–105 | United States |
| Pts: Jung S-m 17; Rebs: Jung S-m 6 Asts: Chun J-w 7 | | Pts: McCray 16; Rebs: McCray 9 Asts: Swoopes 4 |

Morehouse College Gymnasium, Atlanta

Quarterfinal

31 July 1996
15:00

Boxscore

| United States | 108–93 | Japan |
Scoring by half: 59–44, 49–49
| Pts: Leslie 35; Rebs: McClain 16; Asts: Edwards 12 | | Pts: Ichijo, Hagiwara 22; Rebs: Kato 8 Asts: Murakami 10 |

Georgia Dome, Atlanta

Semifinal

2 August 1996
17:00

Boxscore

| Australia | 71–93 | United States |
Scoring by half: 32–47, 39–46
| Pts: Timms 27; Rebs: Maher 6 Asts: Timms 4 | | Pts: Leslie 22; Rebs: McClain 15; Asts: Edwards 8 |

Georgia Dome, Atlanta

Gold medal game

4 August 1996
18:35

Boxscore

| Brazil | 87–111 | United States |
Scoring by half: 46–57, 41–54
| Pts: Arcain 24; Rebs: Alessandra 9 Asts: Paula 10 | | Pts: Leslie 29; Rebs: Leslie 6 Asts: Edwards 10 |

Georgia Dome, Atlanta

== Boxing ==
There was significant controversy surrounding judging of the fight between 19-year-old Floyd Mayweather of the United States and 27-year-old two-time Olympian Serafim Todorov of Bulgaria, with Todorov being awarded the semi-final bout which, according to many observers, was won by Mayweather. The U.S. team filed a protest over the Mayweather bout, claiming the judges were intimidated by Bulgaria's Emil Jetchev (head of the boxing officials) into favoring the Bulgarian Todorov, but it was rejected.

| Athlete | Event | Round of 32 | Round of 16 | Quarterfinal | Semifinal | Final | |
| Athlete | Event | Opponent Result | Opponent Result | Opponent Result | Opponent Result | Opponent Result | Rank |
|---|---|---|---|---|---|---|---|
| Albert Guardado | Light flyweight | Modiradilo (BOT); W 11–9 | Rasoanaivo (MAD); W 9–4 | Kiryukhin (UKR); L 14–19 | Did not advance | | |
| Eric Morel | Flyweight | Romero (CUB); L 12–24 | Did not advance | | | | |
| Zahir Raheem | Bantamweight | Hoe (PRK); W 19–4 | Mesa (CUB); L RSC | Did not advance | | | |
| Floyd Mayweather Jr. | Featherweight | Tileganov (KAZ); W RSC | Gevorgyan (ARM); W 16–3 | Aragon (CUB); W 12–11 | Todorov (BUL); L 9–10 | Did not advance | 3rd place, bronze medalist(s) |
| Terrance Cauthen | Lightweight | Abdoollayev (UZB); W 18–6 | Uitumen (MGL); W 10–9 | Wisngwiset (THA); W 14–10 | Tontchev (BUL); L 12–15 | Did not advance | 3rd place, bronze medalist(s) |
| David Díaz | Light welterweight | Garcia (ISV); W RSC | Urkal (GER); L 6–14 | Did not advance | | | |
| Fernando Vargas | Welterweight | Meskhadze (GEO); W 10–4 | Simion (ROU); L 7–8 | Did not advance | | | |
| David Reid | Light middleweight | Lee (KOR); W 20–4 | Polakovič (CZE); W 12–5 | Marmouri (TUN); W 13–8 | Tulaganov (UZB); W 12–4 | Duvergel (CUB); W KO | 1st place, gold medalist(s) |
| Rhoshii Wells | Middleweight | Mollal (IRI); W 24–7 | Rodríguez (BRA); W 16–2 | Yarvekob (UZB); W 8–8 TB | Hernández (CUB); L 8–17 | Did not advance | 3rd place, bronze medalist(s) |
| Antonio Tarver | Light heavyweight | Vybornov (RUS); W 5–2 | Kowah (SLE); W RSC | Flores (PUR); W RSC | Jirov (KAZ); L 9–15 | Did not advance | 3rd place, bronze medalist(s) |
| Nate Jones | Heavyweight | Bye | Okesola (GBR); W RSC | Jiang (CHN); W 21–4 | Defiagbon (CAN); L 10–16 | Did not advance | 3rd place, bronze medalist(s) |
| Lawrence Clay-Bey | Super heavyweight | Bye | Klitschko (UKR); L 8–10 | Did not advance | | | |

== Canoeing ==
=== Slalom ===
Men

| Athlete | Event | Run 1 | | Run 2 | | Best | |
| Athlete | Event | Time | Rank | Time | Rank | Time | Rank |
|---|---|---|---|---|---|---|---|
| Adam Clawson | C-1 | 2:52.53 | 16 | 4:25.74 | 27 | 2:52.53 | 19 |
| David Hearn | C-1 | 2:44.07 | 10 | 2:42.51 | 6 | 2:42.51 | 9 |
| Wayne Dickert; Horace Holden | C-2 | 3:44.69 | 12 | 3:00.90 | 10 | 3:00.90 | 11 |
| Eric Giddens | K-1 | 3:21.15 | 33 | 2:31.65 | 14 | 2:31.65 | 20 |
| Scott Shipley | K-1 | 2:28.31 | 8 | 2:29.34 | 9 | 2:28.31 | 12 |
| Richard Weiss | K-1 | 2:29.45 | 10 | 2:25.78 | 4 | 2:25.78 | 6 |

Women

| Athlete | Event | Run 1 | | Run 2 | | Best | |
| Athlete | Event | Time | Rank | Time | Rank | Time | Rank |
|---|---|---|---|---|---|---|---|
| Dana Chladek | K-1 | 7:11.80 | 29 | 2:49.49 | 1 | 2:49.49 | 2nd place, silver medalist(s) |
| Cathy Hearn | K-1 | 2:53.03 | 3 | 3:49.93 | 20 | 2:53.03 | 7 |

=== Sprint ===
Men

| Athlete | Event | Heat | | Repechage | | Semifinal | | Final | |
| Athlete | Event | Time | Rank | Time | Rank | Time | Rank | Time | Rank |
|---|---|---|---|---|---|---|---|---|---|
| Jim Terrell | C-1 500 m | 1:57.259 | 7 SF | —N/a | | 1:54.086 | 4 | Did not advance | |
| Joseph Harper | C-1 1000 m | 4:45.467 | 9 SF | —N/a | | 4:39.949 | 7 | Did not advance | |
| Mike Herbert | K-1 500 m | 1:44.763 | 6 R | 1:43.384 | 2 SF | 1:42.335 | 8 | Did not advance | |
| Michael Harbold | K-1 1000 m | 3:58.760 | 6 R | 4:05.225 | 2 SF | 3:44.663 | 7 | Did not advance | |
| Stein Jorgensen; John Mooney | K-2 500 m | 1:33.642 | 3 SF | Bye | | 1:32.353 | 6 | Did not advance | |
| John Mooney; Peter Newton | K-2 1000 m | 3:46.852 | 4 R | 3:34.424 | 1 SF | 3:19.834 | 5 | Did not advance | |
| Curt Bader; Philippe Boccara; Mark Hamilton; Cliff Meidl | K-4 1000 m | 3:23.352 | 8 SF | —N/a | | 3:06.855 | 6 | Did not advance | |

Women

| Athlete | Event | Heat | | Repechage | | Semifinal | | Final | |
| Athlete | Event | Time | Rank | Time | Rank | Time | Rank | Time | Rank |
|---|---|---|---|---|---|---|---|---|---|
| Traci Phillips | K-1 500 m | 2:02.847 | 8 R | 2:00.371 | 5 SF | 1:55.339 | 9 | Did not advance | |
| DeAnne Hemmens; Lia Rousset | K-2 500 m | 1:47.914 | 5 R | 1:52.669 | 2 SF | 1:49.645 | 8 | Did not advance | |
| Alexandra Harbold; DeAnne Hemmens; Lia Rousset; Druella Van Hengel | K-4 500 m | 1:43.311 | 6 SF | —N/a | | 1:40.045 | 4 | Did not advance | |

Key: QF – Qualified to medal final; SF – Qualified to semifinal; R – Qualified to repechage

== Cycling ==
=== Road ===
Men

| Athlete | Event | Time | Rank |
|---|---|---|---|
| Frankie Andreu | Road race | 4:55:10 | 4 |
| Lance Armstrong | Road race | 4:55:29 | 14 |
| Steve Hegg | Road race | 4:56:51 | 93 |
| George Hincapie | Road race | 4:56:49 | 76 |
| Greg Randolph | Road race | 4:56:59 | 74 |
| Lance Armstrong | Time trial | 1:06:28 | 6 |
| Steve Hegg | Time trial | 1:08:29 | 16 |

Women

| Athlete | Event | Time | Rank |
|---|---|---|---|
| Linda Brenneman | Road race | 2:40:27 | 36 |
| Alison Dunlap | Road race | 2:41:21 | 37 |
| Jeanne Golay | Road race | 2:37:06 | 29 |
| Linda Brenneman | Time trial | 38:52 | 11 |
| Jeanne Golay | Time trial | 39:36 | 16 |

=== Track ===
Points race

| Athlete | Event | Points | Rank |
|---|---|---|---|
| Brian McDonough | Men's points race | 5 | 19 |
| Jeanne Golay | Women's points race | 0 | 17 |

Sprint

| Athlete | Event | Qualification | | First round | Repechage 1 | Second round | Repechage 2 | Round of 16 | Repechage 3 | Quarterfinal | Semifinal | Final / BM | |
| Athlete | Event | Time Speed | Rank | Opposition Time | Opposition Time | Opposition Time | Opposition Time | Opposition Time | Opposition Time | Opposition Time | Opposition Time | Opposition Time | Rank |
|---|---|---|---|---|---|---|---|---|---|---|---|---|---|
| William Clay | Men's sprint | 10.543; 68.29 km/h | 12 Q | Himonetos (GRE); L | Arroyo (BOL); W 11.191 | Hill (AUS); L | Chiappa (ITA); Vassilopoulus (GRE); L | Did not advance | | | | | |
| Marty Nothstein | Men's sprint | 10.176; 70.75 km/h | 3 Q | Hyun (KOR); W 11.415 | Bye | Hrbacek (SVK); W 10.899 | Bye | Chiappa (ITA); W 11.047 | Bye | Hill (AUS); W 10.950, W 10.650 | Harnett (CAN); W 10.731, W 10.905 | Fiedler (GER); L, L | 2nd place, silver medalist(s) |
| Connie Paraskevin-Young | Women's sprint | 11.545; 62.36 km/h | 7 Q | —N/a | | | | Neumann (GER); L | Salumäe (EST); Wynd (NZL); L 2 | Did not advance | | | |

Pursuit

| Athlete | Event | Qualifying | | Quarterfinal | Semifinal | Final | |
| Athlete | Event | Time | Rank | Opposition Time | Opposition Time | Opposition Time | Rank |
|---|---|---|---|---|---|---|---|
| Kent Bostick | Men's individual pursuit | 4:33.751 | 9 | Did not advance | | | |
| Dirk Copeland; Mariano Friedick; Adam Laurent; Michael McCarthy | Men's team pursuit | 4:11.950 | 6 Q | Australia; L 4:12.470 | Did not advance | | |
| Rebecca Twigg | Women's individual pursuit | 3:39.849 | 4 Q | Arndt (GER); L 3:41.611 | Did not advance | | |

Time trial

| Athlete | Event | Time | Rank |
|---|---|---|---|
| Erin Hartwell | Men's 1000 m time trial | 1:02.940 | 2nd place, silver medalist(s) |

=== Mountain bike ===
| Athlete | Event | Time | Rank |
|---|---|---|---|
| David Juarez | Men's cross-country | 2:35:15 | 19 |
| Don Myrah | Men's cross-country | 2:35:50 | 20 |
| Susan DeMattei | Women's cross-country | 1:52:36 | 3rd place, bronze medalist(s) |
| Juli Furtado | Women's cross-country | 1:58:32 | 10 |

== Diving ==
Men

| Athlete | Event | Preliminary | | Semifinal | | | | Final | | | |
| Athlete | Event | Points | Rank | Points | Rank | Total | Rank | Points | Rank | Total | Rank |
|---|---|---|---|---|---|---|---|---|---|---|---|
| Scott Donie | 3 m springboard | 414.03 | 4 Q | 223.86 | 4 | 637.89 | 4 Q | 443.07 | 4 | 666.93 | 4 |
| Mark Lenzi | 3 m springboard | 372.03 | 9 Q | 229.74 | 2 | 601.77 | 7 Q | 456.76 | 3 | 686.49 | 3rd place, bronze medalist(s) |
| Patrick Jeffrey | 10 m platform | 406.74 | 5 Q | 174.42 | 9 | 581.16 | 6 Q | 385.80 | 9 | 560.22 | 9 |
| David Pichler | 10 m platform | 394.59 | 6 Q | 175.53 | 8 | 570.12 | 8 Q | 431.58 | 6 | 607.11 | 6 |

Women

| Athlete | Event | Preliminary | | Semifinal | | | | Final | | | |
| Athlete | Event | Points | Rank | Points | Rank | Total | Rank | Points | Rank | Total | Rank |
|---|---|---|---|---|---|---|---|---|---|---|---|
| Jenny Keim | 3 m springboard | 270.48 | 9 Q | 211.17 | 8 | 481.65 | 7 Q | 275.46 | 7 | 486.63 | 9 |
| Melisa Moses | 3 m springboard | 279.75 | 6 Q | 211.95 | 6 | 491.70 | 6 Q | 296.04 | 3 | 507.99 | 4 |
| Mary Ellen Clark | 10 m platform | 253.89 | 12 Q | 174.87 | 3 | 428.76 | 9 Q | 298.08 | 3 | 472.95 | 3rd place, bronze medalist(s) |
| Becky Ruehl | 10 m platform | 323.91 | 2 Q | 163.38 | 8 | 487.29 | 3 Q | 291.81 | 4 | 455.19 | 4 |

== Equestrian ==
Dressage

| Athlete | Horse | Event | Grand Prix Test | | Grand Prix Special | | | | Grand Prix Freestyle | | | |
| Athlete | Horse | Event | Points | Rank | Points | Rank | Total | Rank | Points | Rank | Total | Rank |
|---|---|---|---|---|---|---|---|---|---|---|---|---|
| Robert Dover | Metallic | Individual | 65.96 | 23 Q | 58.79 | 25 | 124.75 | 25 | Did not advance | | | |
| Michelle Gibson | Peron | Individual | 75.20 | 3 Q | 74.28 | 3 | 149.48 | 3 Q | 73.35 | 8 | 222.83 | 5 |
| Steffen Peters | Udon | Individual | 67.80 | 13 Q | 67.63 | 18 | 135.43 | 15 | Did not advance | | | |
| Guenter Seidel | Graf George | Individual | 69.36 | 11 Q | 71.81 | 10 | 141.17 | 10 Q | 73.85 | 7 | 215.02 | 8 |
| Robert Dover; Michelle Gibson; Steffen Peters; Guenter Seidel | See above | Team | 5309 | 3 | —N/a | | | | | | 5309 | 3rd place, bronze medalist(s) |

Eventing

| Athlete | Horse | Event | Dressage | | Cross-country | | | | Show jumping | | | |
| Athlete | Horse | Event | Penalties | Rank | Penalties | Rank | Total | Rank | Penalties | Rank | Total | Rank |
|---|---|---|---|---|---|---|---|---|---|---|---|---|
| Mara Depuy | Hopper | Individual | 40.2 | 4 | 44.80 | 12 | 85.00 | 12 | 0 | =1 | 85.00 | 6 |
| Kerry Milukin | Out and About | Individual | 47.6 | 9 | 19.60 | 3 | 67.20 | 3 | 1.5 | =8 | 73.20 | 3rd place, bronze medalist(s) |
| David O'Connor | Custom Made | Individual | 37.6 | 2 | 30.80 | 8 | 68.40 | 5 | 1.75 | 13 | 80.15 | 5 |
| Bruce Davidson; Jill Henneberg; David O'Connor; Karen O'Connor | Heyday; Nirvana; Giltedge; Biko | Team | 123.00 | 1 | 121.60 | 4 | 244.60 | 2 | 16.50 | 4 | 261.10 | 2nd place, silver medalist(s) |

Jumping

| Athlete | Horse | Event | Qualifying | | | | | | | | | | Final | |
| Athlete | Horse | Event | Round 1 | | Round 2 | | | | Round 3 | | | | Final | |
| Athlete | Horse | Event | Penalties | Rank | Penalties | Rank | Total | Rank | Penalties | Rank | Total | Rank | Penalties | Rank |
|---|---|---|---|---|---|---|---|---|---|---|---|---|---|---|
| Leslie Burr Howard | Extreme | Individual | 0 | =1 | 14 | 56 | 14 | 37 | 0 | =1 | 14 | 14 Q | 8 | =11 |
| Anne Kursinski | Eros | Individual | 0 | =1 | 0 | =1 | 0 | =1 | 8 | =30 | 8 | 6 Q | 16 | =20 |
| Peter Leone | Legato | Individual | 12 | =59 | 4 | =11 | 16 | =38 | 0 | =1 | 16 | =16 Q | DNS | |
| Michael Matz | Rhum | Individual | 4 | =14 | 4 | =11 | 8 | =9 | 4 | =14 | 12 | 9^{[c]} | Did not advance | |
| Leslie Burr Howard; Anne Kursinski; Peter Leone; Michael Matz | See above | Team | —N/a | | 8 | 3 | —N/a | | 4 | =2 | 12 | 2nd place, silver medalist(s) | —N/a | |

^{c} – Though Matz placed high enough to qualify for the final, only three riders per nation were allowed to advance to the final.

== Fencing ==
Fifteen fencers, nine men and six women, represented the United States in 1996.

Men

| Athlete | Event | Round of 64 | Round of 32 | Round of 16 | Quarterfinal | Semifinal | Final / BM | |
| Athlete | Event | Opposition Result | Opposition Result | Opposition Result | Opposition Result | Opposition Result | Opposition Result | Rank |
|---|---|---|---|---|---|---|---|---|
| Cliff Bayer | Individual foil | Bryzhalov (UKR); L 11–15 | Did not advance | | | | | 34 |
| Nick Bravin | Individual foil | Krzesiński (POL); L 14–15 | Did not advance | | | | | 39 |
| Peter Devine | Individual foil | Wang (CHN); L 12–15 | Did not advance | | | | | 37 |
| Cliff Bayer; Nick Bravin; Peter Devine | Team foil | —N/a | | Austria; L 32–45 | Did not advance | | | 10 |
| Tamir Bloom | Individual épée | Jacquet (SUI); W 15–13 | Leroux (FRA); L 9–15 | Did not advance | | | | 31 |
| Jim Carpenter | Individual épée | Paz (COL); W 15–11 | Rivas (COL); L 9–15 | Did not advance | | | | 25 |
| Mike Marx | Individual épée | Ransom (CAN); W 15–9 | Kovács (HUN); L 6–15 | Did not advance | | | | 28 |
| Tamir Bloom; Jim Carpenter; Mike Marx | Team épée | —N/a | | South Korea; W 45–41 | Italy; L 44–45 | Did not advance | | 8 |
| Peter Cox Jr. | Individual sabre | Lee (KOR); W 15–9 | Becker (GER); L 12–15 | Did not advance | | | | 28 |
| Tom Strzalkowski | Individual sabre | Banos (CAN); L 11–15 | Did not advance | | | | | 34 |
| Peter Westbrook | Individual sabre | Williams (GBR); L 8–15 | Did not advance | | | | | 37 |
| Peter Cox Jr. Tom Strzalkowski; Peter Westbrook | Team sabre | —N/a | | Romania; L 40–45 | Did not advance | | | 9 |

Women

| Athlete | Event | Round of 64 | Round of 32 | Round of 16 | Quarterfinal | Semifinal | Final / BM | |
| Athlete | Event | Opposition Result | Opposition Result | Opposition Result | Opposition Result | Opposition Result | Opposition Result | Rank |
|---|---|---|---|---|---|---|---|---|
| Ann Marsh | Individual foil | Bye | Magnan (FRA); W 15–9 | Bau (GER); W 15–8 | Vezzali (ITA); L 10–15 | Did not advance | | 7 |
| Suzanne Paxton | Individual foil | Jeon (KOR); L 14–15 | Did not advance | | | | | 33 |
| Felicia Zimmermann | Individual foil | Bye | Czuckermann-Hatuel (ISR); L 12–15 | Did not advance | | | | 21 |
| Ann Marsh; Suzanne Paxton; Felicia Zimmermann | Team foil | —N/a | | Poland; L 44–45 | Did not advance | | | 10 |
| Elaine Cheris | Individual épée | Chiesa (ITA); L 13–15 | Did not advance | | | | | 39 |
| Nhi Lan Le | Individual épée | Kim (KOR); L 13–15 | Did not advance | | | | | 37 |
| Leslie Marx | Individual épée | Wolf (SUI); W 15–14 | Võsu (EST); L 13–15 | Did not advance | | | | 16 |
| Elaine Cheris; Nhi Lan Le; Leslie Marx | Team épée | —N/a | | South Korea; W 45–44 | Hungary; L 25–45 | Did not advance | | 8 |

== Field hockey ==
Summary

| Team | Event | Preliminary round | | | | | | | | Semifinal / Pl. | Final / BM / Pl. | |
| Team | Event | Opposition Result | Opposition Result | Opposition Result | Opposition Result | Opposition Result | Opposition Result | Opposition Result | Rank | Opposition Result | Opposition Result | Rank |
|---|---|---|---|---|---|---|---|---|---|---|---|---|
| United States men | Men's tournament | Pakistan; L 0–4 | Argentina; L 2–5 | India; L 0–4 | Spain; L 1–7 | Germany; L 0–3 | —N/a | | 6 | 9-12 Semifinal; South Africa; L 0–3 | 11th place match Malaysia; L 1–4 | 12 |
| United States women | Women's tournament | Netherlands; T 1–1 | South Korea; W 3–2 | Great Britain; L 0–1 | Argentina; L 1–2 | Germany; T 1–1 | Australia; L 0–4 | Spain; W 2–0 | 5 | —N/a | Did not advance | 5 |

=== Men's tournament ===
The US men's field hockey team competed for the sixth time at the Summer Olympics. On home soil the squad coached by Jon Clark once again finished twelfth and last.

Roster' Head Coach: Jon Clark

1. Tom Vano
2. Steve Danielson
3. Larry Amar
4. Marq Mellor
5. Scott Williams
6. Steve Jennings
7. Steven van Randwijck
8. Mark Wentges
9. John O'Neill
10. Eelco Wassenaar
11. Nick Butcher
12. Ahmed Elmaghraby
13. Phil Sykes
14. Otto Steffers
15. Ben Maruquin
16. Steve Wagner (GK)

Preliminary round

| Pos | Team | Pld | W | D | L | GF | GA | GD | Pts | Qualification |
|---|---|---|---|---|---|---|---|---|---|---|
| 1 | Spain | 5 | 4 | 0 | 1 | 14 | 5 | +9 | 8 | Advanced to Semi-finals |
| 2 | Germany | 5 | 3 | 1 | 1 | 10 | 3 | +7 | 7 | Advanced to Semi-finals |
| 3 | India | 5 | 2 | 2 | 1 | 8 | 3 | +5 | 6 | |
| 4 | Pakistan | 5 | 2 | 1 | 2 | 11 | 8 | +3 | 5 | |
| 5 | Argentina | 5 | 2 | 0 | 3 | 9 | 13 | −4 | 4 | |
| 6 | United States (H) | 5 | 0 | 0 | 5 | 3 | 23 | −20 | 0 | |

Source: FIH
Rules for classification: 1) points; 2) goal difference; 3) games won; 4) head-to-head result.
(H) Hosts

20 July 1996
17:30

| Pakistan | 4–0 | United States |
|---|---|---|
| Shahbaz 10'; Ashraf 18', 25'; Zaman 62' | Report |

Umpires:
Sasidharan Vasutheven (MAS)
Patrick van Beneden (BEL)

22 July 1996
20:00

| United States | 2–5 | Argentina |
|---|---|---|
| Mellor 39'; Jennings 48' | Report | J. Lombi 4', 12'; Ferrara 15', 26'; Capurro 32' |

Umpires:
Yuri Platonov (RUS)
Don Prior (AUS)

24 July 1996
09:00

| United States | 0–4 | India |
|---|---|---|
| | Report | Ramandeep 10'; Dhanraj 28', 46'; Sanjeev 69' |

Umpires:
Craig Madden (GBR)
Guillaume Langle (FRA)

26 July 1996
20:00

| Spain | 7–1 | United States |
|---|---|---|
| Amat 12', 14'; Escarré 25', 49'; Arnau 60'; Pujol 64'; Cobos 68' | Report | Butcher 37' |

Umpires:
Yuri Platonov (RUS)
Roger St. Rose (TRI)

28 July 1996
17:30

| United States | 0–3 | Germany |
|---|---|---|
| | Report | Fischer 11', 22'; Blunck 23' |

Umpires:
Sasidharan Vasutheven (MAS)
Peter von Reth (NED)

9th-12th place semifinal

31 July 1996
08:30

| South Africa | 3–0 | United States |
|---|---|---|
| Nicol 34'; G. Fulton 46'; C. Fulton 62' | Report |

Umpires:
Floris Idenburg (NED)
Amin Ayman (EGY)

11th place match

1 August 1996
08:30

| Malaysia | 4–1 | United States |
|---|---|---|
| Lim Chiow Chuan 34', 44'; Nawawi 38'; Shanmuganathan 56' | Report | Butcher 68' |

Umpires:
Henrik Ehlers (DEN)
Antonio Morales (ESP)

=== Women's tournament ===
The US women's field hockey team competed for the third time at the Summer Olympics. On home soil the team coached by Pam Hixon and finished fifth.

Roster Head coach: Pam Hixon

1. Patty Shea (GK)
2. Laurel Martin
3. Liz Tchou
4. Marcia Pankratz
5. Cindy Werley
6. Diane Madl
7. Kris Fillat
8. Kelli James
9. Tracey Fuchs
10. Antoinette Lucas
11. Katie Kauffman
12. Andrea Wieland (GK)
13. Leslie Lyness
14. Barbara Marois
15. Jill Reeve
16. Pamela Bustin

Preliminary round

| Pos | Team | Pld | W | D | L | GF | GA | GD | Pts | Qualification |
|---|---|---|---|---|---|---|---|---|---|---|
| 1 | Australia | 7 | 6 | 1 | 0 | 24 | 4 | +20 | 13 | Gold medal match |
| 2 | South Korea | 7 | 4 | 2 | 1 | 18 | 9 | +9 | 10 | Gold medal match |
| 3 | Great Britain | 7 | 3 | 2 | 2 | 12 | 11 | +1 | 8 | Bronze medal match |
| 4 | Netherlands | 7 | 3 | 2 | 2 | 15 | 15 | 0 | 8 | Bronze medal match |
| 5 | United States (H) | 7 | 2 | 2 | 3 | 8 | 11 | −3 | 6 | |
| 6 | Germany | 7 | 2 | 1 | 4 | 10 | 11 | −1 | 5 | |
| 7 | Argentina | 7 | 2 | 1 | 4 | 7 | 21 | −14 | 5 | |
| 8 | Spain | 7 | 0 | 1 | 6 | 5 | 17 | −12 | 1 | |

Source: FIH
Rules for classification: 1) points; 2) goal difference; 3) goals scored; 4) head-to-head result.
(H) Hosts

20 July 1996
09:00

| United States | 1–1 | Netherlands |
|---|---|---|
| Pankratz 69' | Report | Dubbeldam 63' |

Umpires:
Naomi Kato (JPN)
Gina Spitaleri (ITA)

22 July 1996
11:00

| United States | 3–2 | South Korea |
|---|---|---|
| Fuchs 5'; Pankratz 25'; Marois 70' | Report | Chang Eun-jung 49'; Lee Eun-kyung 62' |

Umpires:
Margaret Lanning (CAN)
Naomi Kato (JPN)

23 July 1996
20:00

| United States | 0–1 | Great Britain |
|---|---|---|
| | Report | Simpson 51' |

Umpires:
Kazuko Yasueda (JPN)
Laura Crespo (ARG)

25 July 1996
20:00

| United States | 1–2 | Argentina |
|---|---|---|
| Marois 26' | Report | Masotta 5'; MacKenzie 60' |

Umpires:
Peri Buckley (AUS)
Carola Heinrichs (GER)

26 July 1996
17:30

| United States | 1–1 | Germany |
|---|---|---|
| Werley 54' | Report | Cremer 3' |

Umpires:
Kazuko Yasueda (JPN)
Janice McDonald (GBR)

28 July 1996
11:00

| Australia | 4–0 | United States |
|---|---|---|
| Morris 3'; K. Powell 9'; L. Powell 17'; Kate Starre 24' | Report |

Umpires:
Gill Clarke (GBR)
Kazuko Yasueda (JPN)

30 July 1996
17:30

| Spain | 0–2 | United States |
|---|---|---|
| | Report | Pankratz 18'; Tchou 48' |

Umpires:
Janice McDonald (GBR)
Carola Heinrichs (GER)

== Football (soccer) ==
Summary

| Team | Event | Preliminary round | | | | Quarterfinal | Semifinal | Final / BM | |
| Team | Event | Opposition Result | Opposition Result | Opposition Result | Rank | Opposition Result | Opposition Result | Opposition Result | Rank |
|---|---|---|---|---|---|---|---|---|---|
| United States men | Men's tournament | Argentina; L 1–3 | Tunisia; W 2–0 | Portugal; T 1–1 | 3 | Did not advance | | | 10 |
| United States women | Women's tournament | Denmark; W 3–0 | Sweden; W 2–1 | China; T 0–0 | 2 Q | —N/a | Norway; W 2–1 (a.e.t.) | China; W 2–1 | 1st place, gold medalist(s) |

=== Men's tournament ===
Roster Head coach: Bruce Arena

| No. | Pos. | Player | Date of birth (age) | Caps | Club |
|---|---|---|---|---|---|
| 1 | GK | Kasey Keller* | 29 November 1969 (aged 26) | | (England) Millwall |
| 2 | DF | Matt McKeon | 24 September 1974 (aged 21) | | (United States) Kansas City Wiz |
| 3 | MF | Billy Walsh | 17 October 1975 (aged 20) | | (United States) University of Virginia |
| 4 | DF | Eddie Pope | 24 December 1973 (aged 22) | | (United States) D.C. United |
| 5 | DF | Clint Peay | 16 September 1973 (aged 22) | | (United States) D.C. United |
| 6 | DF | Alexi Lalas* | 1 June 1970 (aged 26) | | (United States) New England Revolution |
| 7 | MF | Imad Baba | 15 March 1974 (aged 22) | | (United States) New England Revolution |
| 8 | FW | Jovan Kirovski | 18 March 1976 (aged 20) | | (England) Manchester United |
| 9 | FW | A. J. Wood | 8 August 1973 (aged 22) | | (United States) MetroStars |
| 10 | MF | Claudio Reyna | 20 July 1973 (aged 23) | | (Germany) Bayer Leverkusen |
| 11 | MF | Miles Joseph | 2 May 1974 (aged 22) | | (United States) MetroStars |
| 12 | DF | Brandon Pollard | 9 October 1973 (aged 22) | | (United States) Dallas Burn |
| 13 | MF | Frankie Hejduk | 5 August 1974 (aged 21) | | (United States) Tampa Bay Mutiny |
| 14 | MF | Brian Maisonneuve | 28 June 1973 (aged 23) | | (United States) Columbus Crew |
| 15 | FW | Nelson Vargas | 6 August 1974 (aged 21) | | (United States) Tampa Bay Mutiny |
| 16 | MF | Rob Smith | 20 August 1973 (aged 22) | | (United States) Columbus Crew |
| 17 | MF | Damian Silvera | 27 July 1974 (aged 21) | | (United States) MetroStars |
| 18 | GK | Chris Snitko | 24 January 1973 (aged 23) | | (United States) Kansas City Wiz |

Preliminary round

| Team | Pld | W | D | L | GF | GA | GD | Pts |
|---|---|---|---|---|---|---|---|---|
| Argentina | 3 | 1 | 2 | 0 | 5 | 3 | +2 | 5 |
| Portugal | 3 | 1 | 2 | 0 | 4 | 2 | +2 | 5 |
| United States | 3 | 1 | 1 | 1 | 4 | 4 | 0 | 4 |
| Tunisia | 3 | 0 | 1 | 2 | 1 | 5 | −4 | 1 |

Source: FIFA
20 July 1996
19:30

| United States | 1–3 | Argentina |
|---|---|---|
| Reyna 1' | Report | G. López 26'; Crespo 55'; Simeone 90' |

Legion Field, Birmingham, Alabama
Attendance: 83,183
Referee: Bouchardeau (NIG)

22 July 1996
19:30

| United States | 2–0 | Tunisia |
|---|---|---|
| Kirovski 38'; Maisonneuve 90' | Report |

Legion Field, Birmingham, Alabama
Attendance: 45,687
Referee: Dallas (GBR)

24 July 1996
19:30

| United States | 1–1 | Portugal |
|---|---|---|
| Maisonneuve 75' | Report | Paulo Alves 33' |

Robert F. Kennedy Stadium, Washington, D.C.
Attendance: 58,012
Referee: Lennie (AUS)

=== Women's tournament ===
Roster Head coach: Tony DiCicco

The United States named a squad of 16 players and 4 alternates for the tournament. Lorrie Fair was invited to the squad as an alternate, but declined due to her disappointment of not making the team.

| No. | Pos. | Player | Date of birth (age) | Caps | Goals | Club |
|---|---|---|---|---|---|---|
| 1 | GK | Briana Scurry | 7 September 1971 (aged 24) | 41 | 0 | |
| 2 | GK | Mary Harvey | 4 June 1965 (aged 31) | | 0 | |
| 3 | FW | Cindy Parlow | 8 May 1978 (aged 18) | | 8 | (United States Soccer Federation) North Carolina Tar Heels |
| 4 | DF | Carla Overbeck (captain) | 9 May 1968 (aged 28) | 95 | 7 | |
| 5 | MF | Tiffany Roberts | 5 May 1977 (aged 19) | 49 | 6 | (United States Soccer Federation) North Carolina Tar Heels |
| 6 | DF | Brandi Chastain | 21 July 1968 (aged 28) | 36 | 9 | |
| 7 | DF | Staci Wilson | 8 July 1976 (aged 20) | | 0 | (United States Soccer Federation) North Carolina Tar Heels |
| 8 | MF | Shannon MacMillan | 7 October 1974 (aged 21) | 23 | 6 | (Japan Football Association) Shiroki FC Serena |
| 9 | FW | Mia Hamm | 17 March 1972 (aged 24) | 116 | 62 | |
| 10 | FW | Michelle Akers | 1 February 1966 (aged 30) | 104 | 92 | |
| 11 | MF | Julie Foudy | 23 January 1971 (aged 25) | 91 | 16 | |
| 12 | FW | Carin Jennings-Gabarra | 9 January 1965 (aged 31) | 113 | 53 | |
| 13 | MF | Kristine Lilly | 22 July 1971 (aged 24) | 116 | 45 | |
| 14 | DF | Joy Fawcett | 8 February 1968 (aged 28) | 96 | 15 | (United States Soccer Federation) Ajax of Manhattan Beach |
| 15 | MF | Tisha Venturini | 3 March 1973 (aged 23) | 66 | 25 | |
| 16 | FW | Tiffeny Milbrett | 23 October 1972 (aged 23) | 60 | 23 | (Japan Football Association) Shiroki FC Serena |

Unenrolled alternate players
| No. | Pos. | Player | Date of birth (age) | Caps | Goals | Club |
|---|---|---|---|---|---|---|
| 17 | MF | Amanda Cromwell | 15 June 1970 (aged 26) | | 1 | |
| 18 | DF | Thori Staples | 17 April 1974 (aged 22) | | 0 | |
| 19 | MF | Jen Streiffer | 25 May 1978 (aged 18) | 0 | 0 | (United States Soccer Federation) Notre Dame Fighting Irish |
| 20 | GK | Saskia Webber | 13 June 1971 (aged 25) | | 0 | |

Preliminary round

| Pos | Team | Pld | W | D | L | GF | GA | GD | Pts | Qualification |
|---|---|---|---|---|---|---|---|---|---|---|
| 1 | China | 3 | 2 | 1 | 0 | 7 | 1 | +6 | 7 | Semi-finals |
| 2 | United States (H) | 3 | 2 | 1 | 0 | 5 | 1 | +4 | 7 | Semi-finals |
| 3 | Sweden | 3 | 1 | 0 | 2 | 4 | 5 | −1 | 3 | |
| 4 | Denmark | 3 | 0 | 0 | 3 | 2 | 11 | −9 | 0 | |

Source: FIFA
Rules for classification: Tiebreakers
(H) Hosts
21 July 1996
16:00

| United States | 3–0 | Denmark |
|---|---|---|
| Venturini 37'; Hamm 41'; Milbrett 49' | Report (FIFA) |

Citrus Bowl, Orlando, Florida
Attendance: 25,303
Referee: Cláudia de Vasconcellos (Brazil)

23 July 1996
16:00

| Denmark | 1–5 | China |
|---|---|---|
| Madsen 55' | Report (FIFA) | Shi Guihong 10'; Liu Ailing 49'; Sun Qingmei 29', 59'; Fan Yunjie 36' |

Orange Bowl, Miami, Florida
Attendance: 34,871
Referee: Benito Archundia (Mexico)

25 July 1996
18:30

| United States | 0–0 | China |
|---|---|---|
| | Report (FIFA) |

Orange Bowl, Miami, Florida
Attendance: 55,650
Referee: Pierluigi Collina (Italy)

Semifinal

28 July 1996

| Norway | 1–2 (a.e.t./g.g.) | United States |
|---|---|---|
| Medalen 18' | Report | Akers 76' (pen.); MacMillan 100' |

Sanford Stadium, Athens, Georgia
Attendance: 64,196
Referee: Sonia Denoncourt (Canada)

Gold medal match

1 August 1996

| China | 1–2 | United States |
|---|---|---|
| Sun 32' | Report | MacMillan 19'; Milbrett 68' |

Sanford Stadium, Athens, Georgia
Attendance: 76,489
Referee: Bente Ovedie Skogvang (Norway)

== Gymnastics ==
=== Artistic ===
Men
Team

| Athlete | Event | Apparatus | | | | | | | | | | | | Total | |
| Athlete | Event | F | | PH | | R | | V | | PB | | HB | | Total | |
| Athlete | Event | C | O | C | O | C | O | C | O | C | O | C | O | Score | Rank |
|---|---|---|---|---|---|---|---|---|---|---|---|---|---|---|---|
| Mihai Bagiu | Team | —N/a | | 9.637 | 9.000 | —N/a | | 9.587 | —N/a | | 9.300 | 8.550 | 9.787 | —N/a | |
| Jair Lynch | Team | 9.500 | 9.725 | 9.475 | 9.587 | 9.250 | 9.300 | 9.587 | 9.575 | 9.650 | 9.725 Q | 9.200 | —N/a | | |
| John Macready | Team | 9.475 | 9.450 | 9.350 | 9.375 | 9.325 | 9.487 | 9.425 | 9.150 | 9.450 | 8.850 | 9.500 | 9.537 | 112.374 | 33 Q |
| John Roethlisberger | Team | 9.587 | 9.725 | 9.700 | 9.100 | 9.600 | 9.600 | 9.562 | 9.575 | 9.575 | 9.575 | 9.500 | 9.787 | 114.886 | 5 Q |
| Kip Simons | Team | 9.300 | 9.325 | —N/a | | 9.462 | 9.650 | 9.525 | 9.425 | 9.300 | 9.537 | 9.400 | 9.537 | —N/a | |
| Chainey Umphrey | Team | 9.300 | 9.250 | 9.225 | 9.250 | 9.375 | 9.625 | —N/a | 9.300 | 9.200 | —N/a | | 9.587 | —N/a | |
| Blaine Wilson | Team | 9.500 | 9.200 | 9.350 | 9.625 | 9.612 | 9.725 Q | 9.575 | 9.625 | 9.500 | 9.425 | 9.475 | 9.725 | 114.337 | 12 Q |
| Total | Team | 94.837 | | 94.449 | | 95.461 | | 95.336 | | 95.037 | | 95.498 | | 570.618 | 5 |

Individual finals

| Athlete | Event | Apparatus | | | | | | Total | |
| Athlete | Event | F | PH | R | V | PB | HB | Score | Rank |
|---|---|---|---|---|---|---|---|---|---|
| John Macready | All-around | 8.525 | 9.537 | 9.537 | 9.562 | 9.487 | 9.562 | 56.210 | 29 |
| John Roethlisberger | All-around | 9.675 | 9.662 | 9.650 | 9.575 | 9.475 | 9.725 | 57.762 | 7 |
| Blaine Wilson | All-around | 9.600 | 9.637 | 9.737 | 9.600 | 9.450 | 9.662 | 57.686 | 10 |
| Blaine Wilson | Rings | —N/a | | 9.737 | —N/a | | | 9.737 | =7 |
| Jair Lynch | Parallel bars | —N/a | | | | 9.825 | —N/a | 9.825 | 2nd place, silver medalist(s) |

Women
Team

| Athlete | Event | Apparatus | | | | | | | | Total | |
| Athlete | Event | V | | UB | | BB | | F | | Total | |
| Athlete | Event | C | O | C | O | C | O | C | O | Score | Rank |
|---|---|---|---|---|---|---|---|---|---|---|---|
| Amanda Borden | Team | —N/a | | | | 9.312 | 9.725 | 9.712 | 9.762 | —N/a | |
| Amy Chow | Team | 9.700 | 9.712 | 9.762 | 9.837 Q | —N/a | | | | | |
| Dominique Dawes | Team | 9.725 | 9.762 Q | 9.762 | 9.850 Q | 9.425 | 9.725 | 9.687 | 9.850 q^{[d]} | 77.786 | 6 Q |
| Shannon Miller | Team | 9.762 | 9.700 q^{[d]} | 9.775 | 9.787 | 9.737 | 9.862 Q | 9.787 | 9.618 | 78.028 | 2 Q |
| Dominique Moceanu | Team | 9.662 | 9.200 | 9.725 | 9.812 | 9.687 | 9.850 Q | 9.750 | 9.837 Q | 77.523 | 11 q^{[d]} |
| Jaycie Phelps | Team | 9.587 | 9.662 | 9.712 | 9.787 | 9.012 | 9.600 | 9.662 | 9.750 | 76.722 | 17 |
| Kerri Strug | Team | 9.812 | 9.712 Q^{[d]} | 9.675 | 9.787 | 9.350 | 9.737 | 9.825 | 9.837 Q^{[d]} | 77.735 | 7 Q^{[d]} |
| Total | Team | 97.209 | | 97.809 | | 96.410 | | 97.797 | | 389.225 | 1st place, gold medalist(s) |

Individual finals

| Athlete | Event | Apparatus | | | | Total | |
| Athlete | Event | V | UB | BB | F | Score | Rank |
|---|---|---|---|---|---|---|---|
| Dominique Dawes | All-around | 9.681 | 9.812 | 9.825 | 9.000 | 38.318 | =17 |
| Shannon Miller | All-around | 9.724 | 9.750 | 9.862 | 9.475 | 38.811 | 8 |
| Dominique Moceanu | All-around | 9.706 | 9.762 | 9.600 | 9.687 | 38.755 | 9 |
| Dominique Dawes | Vault | 9.649 | —N/a | | | 9.649 | 6 |
| Shannon Miller | Vault | 9.350 | —N/a | | | 9.350 | 8 |
| Amy Chow | Uneven bars | —N/a | 9.837 | —N/a | | 9.837 | 2nd place, silver medalist(s) |
| Dominique Dawes | Uneven bars | —N/a | 9.800 | —N/a | | 9.800 | 4 |
| Shannon Miller | Balance beam | —N/a | | 9.862 | —N/a | 9.862 | 1st place, gold medalist(s) |
| Dominique Moceanu | Balance beam | —N/a | | 9.125 | —N/a | 9.125 | 6 |
| Dominique Dawes | Floor | —N/a | | | 9.837 | 9.837 | 3rd place, bronze medalist(s) |
| Dominique Moceanu | Floor | —N/a | | | 9.825 | 9.825 | 4 |

^{d} – Strug slightly injured her ankle during her first vault attempt in the final rotation of the team competition, then exacerbated the injury on her second attempt to dramatically clinch the gold for the United States. Due to her injury, she was unable to compete in the individual finals. She was replaced by highest non-qualifiers in the vault (Miller), in the floor exercise (Dawes) and in the all-around (Moceanu). Strug had the highest score in the floor and would have been favored to win the gold.

=== Rhythmic ===
Individual

| Athlete | Event | Preliminaries | | | | | | Semifinal | | | | | | Final | | | | | |
| Athlete | Event | Apparatus | | | | Total | | Apparatus | | | | Total | | Apparatus | | | | Total | |
| Athlete | Event | Rope | Ball | Clubs | Ribbon | Score | Rank | Rope | Ball | Clubs | Ribbon | Score | Rank | Rope | Ball | Clubs | Ribbon | Score | Rank |
|---|---|---|---|---|---|---|---|---|---|---|---|---|---|---|---|---|---|---|---|
| Jessica Davis | All-around | 9.166 | 9.200 | 9.216 | 8.982 | 36.564 | 30 | Did not advance | | | | | | | | | | | |

Group

| Athlete | Event | Preliminaries | | | | Final | | | |
| Athlete | Event | Apparatus | | Total | | Apparatus | | Total | |
| Athlete | Event | 5 balls | 3 Balls 2 Ropes | Score | Rank | 5 balls | 3 Balls 2 Ropes | Score | Rank |
|---|---|---|---|---|---|---|---|---|---|
| Mandy James; Alaine Mata-Baquerot; Kate Nelson; Brandi Siegel; Challen Sievers; Becky Turner | All-around | 18.400 | 18.233 | 36.633 | 9 | Did not advance | | | |

== Handball ==
Summary

| Team | Event | Preliminary round | | | | | | Semifinal | Final / BM / Pl. | |
| Team | Event | Opposition Result | Opposition Result | Opposition Result | Opposition Result | Opposition Result | Rank | Opposition Result | Opposition Result | Rank |
|---|---|---|---|---|---|---|---|---|---|---|
| United States men | Men's tournament | Sweden; L 19–23 | Russia; L 16–31 | Croatia; L 27–35 | Switzerland; L 20–29 | Kuwait; W 29–24 | 5 | Did not advance | 9th place final Algeria; W 27–26 (ET) | 9 |
| United States women | Women's tournament | Hungary; L 24–30 | Denmark; L 19–29 | China; L 21–31 | —N/a | | 4 | Did not advance | 7th place final Angola; L 23–24 | 8 |

=== Men's tournament ===
Roster
The following players represented the United States:

- Derek Brown
- Greg Caccia
- David DeGraaf
- Yaro Dachniwsky
- Robert Dunn
- Denny Fercho
- Joe Fitzgerald
- Tom Fitzgerald
- Darrick Heath
- John Keller
- Cliff Mannon
- Steve Penn
- Matt Ryan
- Mark Schmocker
- Michael Thornberry
- Chip Van Os

Preliminary round

| Pos | Team | Pld | W | D | L | GF | GA | GD | Pts | Qualification |
|---|---|---|---|---|---|---|---|---|---|---|
| 1 | Sweden | 5 | 5 | 0 | 0 | 131 | 94 | +37 | 10 | Semifinals |
| 2 | Croatia | 5 | 4 | 0 | 1 | 132 | 122 | +10 | 8 | Semifinals |
| 3 | Russia | 5 | 3 | 0 | 2 | 137 | 106 | +31 | 6 | Fifth place game |
| 4 | Switzerland | 5 | 2 | 0 | 3 | 126 | 115 | +11 | 4 | Seventh place game |
| 5 | United States (H) | 5 | 1 | 0 | 4 | 111 | 142 | −31 | 2 | Ninth place game |
| 6 | Kuwait | 5 | 0 | 0 | 5 | 100 | 158 | −58 | 0 | Eleventh place game |

Rules for classification: 1) points; 2) head-to-head points; 3) head-to-head goal difference; 4) head-to-head number of goals scored; 5) goal difference.
(H) Hosts

| 24 July 1996; 19:00 | Sweden | 23–19 | United States | Georgia World Congress Center; Referees: Gedvilas, Guterman (LTU) |
| 24 July 1996; 19:00 | Wislander 5 | (11–9) | Heath 4 | Georgia World Congress Center; Referees: Gedvilas, Guterman (LTU) |

| 25 July 1996; 20:45 | Russia | 31–16 | United States | Georgia World Congress Center; Referees: Moelle Mabounda, Mvoula (CGO) |
| 25 July 1996; 20:45 | Kudinov 10 | (16–9) | Penn 4 | Georgia World Congress Center; Referees: Moelle Mabounda, Mvoula (CGO) |

| 27 July 1996; 19:00 | Croatia | 35–27 | United States | Georgia World Congress Center; Referees: Garcia, Moréno (FRA) |
| 27 July 1996; 19:00 | Smajlagić 11 | (20–9) | Brown 8 | Georgia World Congress Center; Referees: Garcia, Moréno (FRA) |

| 29 July 1996; 20:45 | United States | 20–29 | Switzerland | Georgia World Congress Center; Referees: Thomas, Thomas (GER) |
| 29 July 1996; 20:45 | Heath 7 | (9–12) | Baumgartner 13 | Georgia World Congress Center; Referees: Thomas, Thomas (GER) |

| 31 July 1996; 20:45 | Kuwait | 24–29 | United States | Georgia World Congress Center; Referees: Dăncescu, Mateescu (ROU) |
| 31 July 1996; 20:45 | S. Al-Marzouq 9 | (10–13) | DeGraaf 13 | Georgia World Congress Center; Referees: Dăncescu, Mateescu (ROU) |

Ninth place game

2 August 1996
11:30
Algeria
26–27 (ET)
United States
Georgia World Congress Center
Referees: Al-Houli, Al-Enezi (KUW)
Saidi 6
(12–10)
Brown 7

FT: 22–22 ET: 4–5

=== Women's tournament ===
Roster
The following players represented the United States:

- Dawn Allinger
- Pat Neder
- Sharon Cain
- Kim Clarke
- Laura Coenen
- Kristen Danihy
- Jennifer Demby-Horton
- Lisa Eagen
- Laurie Fellner
- Chryssandra Hires
- Tami Jameson
- Toni Jameson
- Dannette Leininger
- Dawn Marple
- Carol Peterka
- Cheryl Abplanalp

Preliminary round

| Pos | Team | Pld | W | D | L | GF | GA | GD | Pts | Qualification |
|---|---|---|---|---|---|---|---|---|---|---|
| 1 | Denmark | 3 | 3 | 0 | 0 | 89 | 62 | +27 | 6 | Semifinals |
| 2 | Hungary | 3 | 2 | 0 | 1 | 81 | 70 | +11 | 4 | Semifinals |
| 3 | China | 3 | 1 | 0 | 2 | 71 | 83 | −12 | 2 | Fifth place game |
| 4 | United States (H) | 3 | 0 | 0 | 3 | 64 | 90 | −26 | 0 | Seventh place game |

Rules for classification: 1) points; 2) head-to-head points; 3) head-to-head goal difference; 4) head-to-head number of goals scored; 5) goal difference.
(H) Hosts

| 26 July 1996; 14:30 | Denmark | 29–19 | United States | Georgia World Congress Center; Referees: Brussel, van Dongen (NED) |
| 26 July 1996; 14:30 | A. Andersen 8 | (13–9) | Hires 8 | Georgia World Congress Center; Referees: Brussel, van Dongen (NED) |

| 28 July 1996; 14:30 | United States | 24–30 | Hungary | Georgia World Congress Center; Referees: Thomas, Thomas (GER) |
| 28 July 1996; 14:30 | Hires 8 | (8–19) | Németh 6 | Georgia World Congress Center; Referees: Thomas, Thomas (GER) |

| 30 July 1996; 16:30 | China | 31–21 | United States | Georgia World Congress Center; Referees: Guterman, Gedvilas (LTU) |
| 30 July 1996; 16:30 | Zhai 11 | (16–11) | Hires 6 | Georgia World Congress Center; Referees: Guterman, Gedvilas (LTU) |

Seventh place game

| 1 August 1996; 10:00 | United States | 23–24 | Angola | Georgia World Congress Center; Referees: Moelle Mabounda, Mvoula (CGO) |
| 1 August 1996; 10:00 | Cain 8 | (11–11) | Barbosa 6 | Georgia World Congress Center; Referees: Moelle Mabounda, Mvoula (CGO) |

== Judo ==
Men

| Athlete | Event | Round of 64 | Round of 32 | Round of 16 | Quarterfinal | Semifinal | Repechage 1 | Repechage 2 | Repechage 3 | Final / BM | |
| Athlete | Event | Opposition Result | Opposition Result | Opposition Result | Opposition Result | Opposition Result | Opposition Result | Opposition Result | Opposition Result | Opposition Result | Rank |
|---|---|---|---|---|---|---|---|---|---|---|---|
| Clifton Sunada | –60 kg | Bye | Trautmann (GER); L 0000–1000 | Did not advance | | | Bagirov (BLR); L 0000–1000 | Did not advance | | | |
| Orlando Fuentes | –65 kg | Bye | Akhirov (KAZ); W 0000–0000 S | Laats (BEL); L 0000–1000 | Did not advance | | Revazishvilli (GEO); L 0000–1000 | Did not advance | | | |
| James Pedro | –71 kg | Bye | Kingston (GBR); W 1000–0000 | Boldbaatar (MGL); L 0000–10000 | Did not advance | | Alquati (ARG); W 1000–0000 | Dgebuadze (GEO); W 0010–0000 | Schmidt (GER); W 1000–0000 | Bronze medal final Pereira (BRA); W 1000–0000 | 3rd place, bronze medalist(s) |
| Jason Morris | –78 kg | Bye | Balayan (UKR); W 0001–0000 | Uznadze (TUR); L 0000–0100 | Did not advance | | | | | | |
| Brian Olsen | –86 kg | Bye | Wu (TPE); W 0010–0000 | Merievicius (LTU); L 0000–0100 | Did not advance | | | | | | |
| Rene Capo | –95 kg | Bye | Lobzhanidze (GEO); L 0000–1000 | Did not advance | | | | | | | |
| Damon Keeve | +95 kg | Bye | Sharapov (BLR); L 0000–1000 | Did not advance | | | | | | | |

Women

| Athlete | Event | Round of 32 | Round of 16 | Quarterfinal | Semifinal | Repechage 1 | Repechage 2 | Repechage 3 | Final / BM | |
| Athlete | Event | Opposition Result | Opposition Result | Opposition Result | Opposition Result | Opposition Result | Opposition Result | Opposition Result | Opposition Result | Rank |
|---|---|---|---|---|---|---|---|---|---|---|
| Hillary Wolf | –48 kg | Bye | Yu (TPE); W 1000–0000 | Savon (CUB); L 0000–1000 | Did not advance | Bye | Souakri (ALG); L 0000–0000 Y | Did not advance | | |
| Marisa Pedulla | –52 kg | Goossens (BEL); W 0100–0000 | Santaella (VEN); W 10000–0000 | Restoux (FRA); L 0000–0100 | Did not advance | Bye | Brain-Grainger (AUS); W 0000–0000 Y | Muñoz (ESP); L 0000–0000 S | Did not advance | |
| Corinna West | –56 kg | Bye | Liu (CHN); L 0000–1000 | Did not advance | | Garipova (RUS); L 0000–1000 | Did not advance | | | |
| Celita Schutz | –61 kg | Griffith (VEN); L 0000–1000 | Did not advance | | | | | | | |
| Liliko Ogasawara | –66 kg | Bye | Zwiers (NED); L 0000–0010 | Did not advance | | Bye | Wu (TPE); W 1000–0000 | Wang (CHN); L 0000–1000 | Did not advance | |
| Sandy Bacher | –72 kg | Ertel (GER); L 0000–1000 | Did not advance | | | | | | | |
| Colleen Rosensteel | +72 kg | Burnett (AUS); L 0000–1000 | Did not advance | | | —N/a | Did not advance | | | |

== Modern pentathlon ==
| Athlete | Event | Riding (show jumping) | | | Fencing (épée one touch) | | | Shooting (10 m air pistol) | | | Swimming (200 m freestyle) | | | Running (3000 m cross-country) | | | Total | |
| Athlete | Event | Penalties | Rank | MP Points | Results | Rank | MP Points | Points | Rank | MP Points | Time | Rank | MP Points | Time | Rank | MP Points | Points | Rank |
|---|---|---|---|---|---|---|---|---|---|---|---|---|---|---|---|---|---|---|
| Michael Gostigian | Individual | 57 | 7 | 1043 | 15 W – 17 L | =18 | 790 | 170 | =25 | 976 | 3:16.38 | 5 | 1304 | 13:11.327 | 16 | 1192 | 5305 | 16 |

== Rowing ==
Men

| Athlete | Event | Heat | | Repechage | | Semifinal | | Final | |
| Athlete | Event | Time | Rank | Time | Rank | Time | Rank | Time | Rank |
|---|---|---|---|---|---|---|---|---|---|
| Cyrus Beasley | Single sculls | 7:44.79 | 3 R | 7:44.36 | 2 SA/B | 7:31.49 | 4 FB | 6:54.17 | 10 |
| Adam Holland; Michael Peterson | Pair | 6:53.95 | 2 R | 7:02.13 | 1 SA/B | 6:52.92 | 4 FB | 6:33.81 | 7 |
| Tom Auth; Steve Peterson | Lightweight double sculls | 6:50.55 | 2 Q | 6:20.93 | 1 SA/B | 6:29.80 | 4 FB | 6:25.89 | 9 |
| Sean Hall; Jeff Klepacki; Tom Murray; Jason Scott | Four | 6:20.72 | 4 R | 6:30.95 | 3 SA/B | 6:18.68 | 5 FB | 5:59.91 | 11 |
| William Carlucci; David Collins; Jeff Pfaendtner; Marc Schneider | Lightweight four | 6:21.85 | 2 R | 5:58.58 | 1 SA/B | 6:09.89 | 1 FA | 6:12.29 | 3rd place, bronze medalist(s) |
| Jason Gailes; Brian Jamieson; Eric Mueller; Tim Young | Quadruple sculls | 6:06.95 | 2 SA/B | Bye | | 5:57.97 | 2 FA | 5:59.10 | 2nd place, silver medalist(s) |
| Jon Brown; Doug Burden; Porter Collins; Fred Honebein; Bob Kaehler; Jamie Koven; Ted Murphy; Steven Segaloff; Don Smith | Eight | 5:44.87 | 1 FA | Bye | | —N/a | | 5:48.45 | 5 |

Women

| Athlete | Event | Heat | | Repechage | | Semifinal | | Final | |
| Athlete | Event | Time | Rank | Time | Rank | Time | Rank | Time | Rank |
|---|---|---|---|---|---|---|---|---|---|
| Ruth Davidon | Single sculls | 8:09.78 | 3 R | 8:33.73 | 1 SA/B | 7:54.97 | 2 FA | 7:46.47 | 6 |
| Karen Kraft; Melissa Schwen | Pair | 7:34.29 | 1 SA/B | Bye | | 7:29.31 | 1 FA | 7:01.78 | 2nd place, silver medalist(s) |
| Jennifer Devine; Michelle Knox-Zaloom | Double sculls | 7:31.98 | 3 SA/B | Bye | | 7:21.97 | 5 FB | 6:58.78 | 9 |
| Teresa Bell; Lindsay Burns | Lightweight double sculls | 7:28.28 | 1 SA/B | Bye | | 7:09.47 | 1 FA | 7:14.65 | 2nd place, silver medalist(s) |
| Julia Chilicki; Cathy Symon; Dré Thies; Cécile Tucker | Quadruple sculls | 6:54.73 | 5 R | 6:25.54 | 4 FB | —N/a | | 6:24.49 | 8 |
| Jennifer Dore; Catriona Fallon; Yasmin Farooq; Amy Fuller; Anne Kakela; Laurel Korholz; Betsy McCagg; Mary McCagg; Monica Tranel Michini | Eight | 6:28.45 | 2 R | 6:06.17 | 1 FA | —N/a | | 6:26.19 | 4 |

Qualification legend: FA=Final A (medal); FB=Final B (non-medal); FC=Final C (non-medal); FD=Final D (non-medal); SA/B=Semifinal A/B; SC/D=Semifinal C/D; R=Repechage

== Sailing ==
Men

| Athlete | Event | Race | | | | | | | | | | | Total | |
| Athlete | Event | 1 | 2 | 3 | 4 | 5 | 6 | 7 | 8 | 9 | 10 | 11 | Points | Rank |
|---|---|---|---|---|---|---|---|---|---|---|---|---|---|---|
| Mike Gebhardt | Mistral | 10 | ~~16~~ | 3 | 4 | 5 | ~~23~~ | 4 | 11 | 4 | —N/a | | 41 | 6 |
| Will Martin | Finn | ~~PMS~~ | 22 | 18 | 12 | 21 | 2 | ~~PMS~~ | 25 | 17 | 19 | —N/a | 136 | 23 |
| Kevin Burnham; Morgan Reeser | 470 | 20 | 9 | 6 | 9 | 1 | 11 | ~~DSQ~~ | 4 | ~~PMS~~ | 1 | 13 | 74 | 8 |

Women

| Athlete | Event | Race | | | | | | | | | | | Total | |
| Athlete | Event | 1 | 2 | 3 | 4 | 5 | 6 | 7 | 8 | 9 | 10 | 11 | Points | Rank |
|---|---|---|---|---|---|---|---|---|---|---|---|---|---|---|
| Lanee Butler | Mistral | 9 | ~~15~~ | ~~18~~ | 7 | 11 | 13 | 1 | 8 | 4 | —N/a | | 53 | 11 |
| Courtenay Becker-Dey | Europe | 1 | 8 | 2 | 4 | 7 | 6 | 3 | ~~14~~ | ~~9~~ | 2 | 6 | 39 | 3rd place, bronze medalist(s) |
| Kris Stookey; Louise Van Voorhis | 470 | 2 | 8 | 2 | 1 | 4 | ~~12~~ | ~~14~~ | 2 | 14 | 5 | 11 | 46 | 4 |

Open
Fleet racing

| Athlete | Event | Race | | | | | | | | | | | Total | |
| Athlete | Event | 1 | 2 | 3 | 4 | 5 | 6 | 7 | 8 | 9 | 10 | 11 | Points | Rank |
|---|---|---|---|---|---|---|---|---|---|---|---|---|---|---|
| Nick Adamson | Laser | 9 | ~~DSQ~~ | 13 | 7 | 13 | 14 | 10 | ~~DSQ~~ | 27 | 14 | DSQ; 57 | 164 | 21 |
| Hal Haenel; Mark Reynolds | Star | 3 | 2 | 5 | 5 | 5 | ~~21~~ | 15 | ~~22~~ | 18 | 5 | —N/a | 58 | 8 |
| John Lovell; Charlie Ogletree | Tornado | 3 | 4 | 8 | 4 | 4 | 11 | 3 | ~~12~~ | 1 | 10 | ~~12~~ | 48 | 8 |

Mixed racing

| Athlete | Event | Fleet racing | | | | | | | | | | | | Match racing | | | |
| Athlete | Event | Race | | | | | | | | | | Total | | Quarterfinal | Semifinal | Final / BM | |
| Athlete | Event | 1 | 2 | 3 | 4 | 5 | 6 | 7 | 8 | 9 | 10 | Points | Rank | Opposition Result | Opposition Result | Opposition Result | Rank |
|---|---|---|---|---|---|---|---|---|---|---|---|---|---|---|---|---|---|
| Jim Barton; Jeff Madrigali; Kent Massey | Soling | 1 | 4 | 9 | 2 | 5 | ~~19~~ | 5 | 9 | 1 | ~~12~~ | 36 | 2 Q | Bye | Russia; L 0–3 | Bronze medal race Great Britain; W 3–1 | 3rd place, bronze medalist(s) |

== Shooting ==
Men

| Athlete | Event | Qualification | | Final | | Total | |
| Athlete | Event | Points | Rank | Points | Rank | Points | Rank |
|---|---|---|---|---|---|---|---|
| Glenn Dubis | 10 m air rifle | 594 | 41 | Did not advance | | | |
| Rob Harbison | 10 m air rifle | 594 | 2 Q | 97.8 | 7 | 691.8 | 7 |
| Adam Saathoff | 10 m running target | 555 | 20 | Did not advance | | | |
| Bill Meek | 50 m rifle prone | 597 | 5 Q | 101.9 | 7 | 698.9 | 8 |
| Eric Uptagrafft | 50 m rifle prone | 592 | 30 | Did not advance | | | |
| Glenn Dubis | 50 m rifle three position | 1165 | 10 | Did not advance | | | |
| Rob Harbison | 50 m rifle three position | 1170 | 4 Q | 97.7 | 5 | 1267.7 (+8.6) | 6 |
| Ben Amonette | 10 m air pistol | 569 | 44 | Did not advance | | | |
| Neal Caloia | 10 m air pistol | 571 | 41 | Did not advance | | | |
| Roger Mar | 25 m rapid fire pistol | 581 | 18 | Did not advance | | | |
| John McNally | 25 m rapid fire pistol | 583 | 12 | Did not advance | | | |
| Ben Amonette | 50 m pistol | 555 | 25 | Did not advance | | | |
| Neal Caloia | 50 m pistol | 544 | 39 | Did not advance | | | |
| Lance Bade | Trap | 123 | 2 Q | 24 | =2 | 147 (+27) | 3rd place, bronze medalist(s) |
| Bret Erickson | Trap | 119 | 20 | Did not advance | | | |
| Josh Lakatos | Trap | 123 | 3 Q | 24 | =2 | 147 (+28) | 2nd place, silver medalist(s) |
| David Alcoriza | Double trap | 138 (+1) | 8 | Did not advance | | | |
| Lance Bade | Double trap | 136 | 10 | Did not advance | | | |
| James Graves | Skeet | 120 | 15 | Did not advance | | | |
| George Quigley | Skeet | 118 | 26 | Did not advance | | | |
| Bill Roy | Skeet | 121 | 7 | Did not advance | | | |

Women

| Athlete | Event | Qualification | | Final | | Total | |
| Athlete | Event | Points | Rank | Points | Rank | Points | Rank |
|---|---|---|---|---|---|---|---|
| Elizabeth Bourland | 10 m air rifle | 392 | 13 | Did not advance | | | |
| Nancy Napolski | 10 m air rifle | 386 | 36 | Did not advance | | | |
| Elizabeth Bourland | 50 m rifle three position | 583 | 6 Q | 91.0 | 7 | 674.0 | 7 |
| Jean Foster | 50 m rifle three position | 578 | 12 | Did not advance | | | |
| Jo Ann Sevin | 10 m air pistol | 371 | 32 | Did not advance | | | |
| Rebecca Snyder | 10 m air pistol | 372 | 30 | Did not advance | | | |
| Libby Callahan | 25 m pistol | 573 | 20 | Did not advance | | | |
| Connie Petracek | 25 m pistol | 578 | 9 | Did not advance | | | |
| Theresa DeWitt | Double trap | 105 | 4 Q | 32 | 4 | 137 | 4 |
| Kim Rhode | Double trap | 108 OR | 1 Q | 33 | 3 | 141 OR | 1st place, gold medalist(s) |

== Softball ==
Summary

| Team | Event | Round robin | | | | | | | | Semifinal | Bronze medal game | Final | |
| Team | Event | Opposition Result | Opposition Result | Opposition Result | Opposition Result | Opposition Result | Opposition Result | Opposition Result | Rank | Opposition Result | Opposition Result | Opposition Result | Rank |
|---|---|---|---|---|---|---|---|---|---|---|---|---|---|
| United States women | Women's tournament | Puerto Rico; W 10–0 | Netherlands; W 9–0 | Japan; W 6–1 | Chinese Taipei; W 10–0 | Canada; W 4–2 | Australia; L 1–2 | China; W 3–2 | 1 Q | China; W 1–0 | Bye | China; W 3–1 | 1st place, gold medalist(s) |

Roster

- Lisa Fernandez
- Leah O'Brien-Amico
- Laura Berg
- Lori Harrigan
- Dorothy Richardson
- Christa Williams
- Michele Smith
- Gillian Boxx
- Sheila Cornell
- Michele Granger
- Dionna Harris
- Kim Maher
- Julie Smith
- Shelly Stokes
- Dani Tyler

- Head coach: Ralph Raymond

Preliminary round robin

| Qualified for the semifinals |
| Eliminated |

The top four teams advanced to the semifinal round.

| Team | W | L | RS | RA | WIN% | GB | Tiebreaker |
|---|---|---|---|---|---|---|---|
| United States | 6 | 1 | 37 | 7 | .857 | - | - |
| China | 5 | 2 | 29 | 9 | .714 | 1 | 3 RA vs. AUS/JPN |
| Australia | 5 | 2 | 22 | 11 | .714 | 1 | 6 RA vs. CHN/JPN |
| Japan | 5 | 2 | 24 | 18 | .714 | 1 | 10 RA vs. CHN/AUS |
| Canada | 3 | 4 | 15 | 17 | .429 | 3 | - |
| Chinese Taipei | 2 | 5 | 19 | 19 | .286 | 4 | - |
| Netherlands | 1 | 6 | 4 | 32 | .143 | 5 | 1–0 vs. PUR |
| Puerto Rico | 1 | 6 | 5 | 44 | .143 | 5 | 0–1 vs. NED |

July 21

| Team | 1 | 2 | 3 | 4 | 5 | 6 | R | H | E |
|---|---|---|---|---|---|---|---|---|---|
| Puerto Rico | 0 | 0 | 0 | 0 | 0 | 0 | 0 | 2 | 3 |
| United States | 2 | 0 | 3 | 0 | 0 | 5 | 10 | 13 | 0 |
WP: Granger (1–0) LP: Martinez (0–1)

July 23

| Team | 1 | 2 | 3 | 4 | 5 | 6 | 7 | R | H | E |
|---|---|---|---|---|---|---|---|---|---|---|
| Japan | 0 | 0 | 0 | 0 | 1 | 0 | 0 | 0 | 2 | 1 |
| United States | 3 | 0 | 0 | 0 | 0 | 3 | – | 6 | 10 | 0 |
WP: M Smith (1–0) LP: Kobayashi (0–1)

July 25

| Team | 1 | 2 | 3 | 4 | 5 | 6 | 7 | R | H | E |
|---|---|---|---|---|---|---|---|---|---|---|
| United States | 0 | 0 | 0 | 1 | 1 | 0 | 2 | 4 | 4 | 1 |
| Canada | 0 | 0 | 0 | 0 | 2 | 0 | 0 | 2 | 6 | 5 |
WP: Williams (2–0) LP: Snelgrove (1–1)

July 27

| Team | 1 | 2 | 3 | 4 | 5 | 6 | 7 | R | H | E |
|---|---|---|---|---|---|---|---|---|---|---|
| China | 0 | 0 | 0 | 0 | 0 | 2 | 0 | 2 | 5 | 0 |
| United States | 0 | 1 | 0 | 0 | 0 | 2 | – | 3 | 8 | 1 |
WP: M Smith (2–0) LP: Wang L (3–2)

July 22

| Team | 1 | 2 | 3 | 4 | 5 | 6 | 7 | R | H | E |
|---|---|---|---|---|---|---|---|---|---|---|
| Netherlands | 0 | 0 | 0 | 0 | 0 | 0 | 0 | 0 | 2 | 3 |
| United States | 0 | 5 | 0 | 3 | 1 | 0 | – | 9 | 10 | 1 |
WP: Williams (1–0) LP: Knol (0–1)

July 24

| Team | 1 | 2 | 3 | 4 | 5 | 6 | 7 | R | H | E |
|---|---|---|---|---|---|---|---|---|---|---|
| Chinese Taipei | 0 | 0 | 0 | 0 | 0 | 0 | 0 | 0 | 2 | 4 |
| United States | 1 | 1 | 2 | 0 | 0 | 0 | – | 4 | 5 | 1 |
WP: Harrigan (1–0) LP: Tu HM (1–1)

July 26

| Team | 1 | 2 | 3 | 4 | 5 | 6 | 7 | 8 | 9 | 10 | R | H | E |
|---|---|---|---|---|---|---|---|---|---|---|---|---|---|
| United States | 0 | 0 | 0 | 0 | 0 | 0 | 0 | 0 | 0 | 1 | 1 | 6 | 0 |
| Australia | 0 | 0 | 0 | 0 | 0 | 0 | 0 | 0 | 0 | 2 | 2 | 1 | 2 |
WP: Harding (2–0) LP: Fernandez (0–1)

Semifinal

| Team | 1 | 2 | 3 | 4 | 5 | 6 | 7 | 8 | 9 | 10 | R | H | E |
|---|---|---|---|---|---|---|---|---|---|---|---|---|---|
| China | 0 | 0 | 0 | 0 | 0 | 0 | 0 | 0 | 0 | 0 | 0 | 3 | 2 |
| United States | 0 | 0 | 0 | 0 | 0 | 0 | 0 | 0 | 0 | 1 | 1 | 10 | 0 |
WP: Fernandez (1-1) LP: Wang L (3-2)

Final

| Team | 1 | 2 | 3 | 4 | 5 | 6 | 7 | R | H | E |
|---|---|---|---|---|---|---|---|---|---|---|
| China | 0 | 0 | 0 | 0 | 0 | 1 | 0 | 1 | 4 | 2 |
| United States | 0 | 0 | 3 | 0 | 0 | 0 | 0 | 3 | 4 | 0 |
WP: Michele Granger (2-0) LP: Liu Y (0-1) Sv: Fernandez (1)

== Swimming ==
Men

| Athlete | Event | Heat | | Final | |
| Athlete | Event | Time | Rank | Time | Rank |
|---|---|---|---|---|---|
| David Fox | 50 m freestyle | 22.64 | 6 FA | 22.68 | 6 |
| Gary Hall Jr. | 50 m freestyle | 23.36 | 2 FA | 22.26 | 2nd place, silver medalist(s) |
| Gary Hall Jr. | 100 m freestyle | 48.90 | 2 FA | 48.81 | 2nd place, silver medalist(s) |
| Jon Olsen | 100 m freestyle | 50.17 | 12 FB | 49.80 | 9 |
| Josh Davis | 200 m freestyle | 1:48.63 | 3 FA | 1:48.54 | 7 |
| John Piersma | 200 m freestyle | 1:50.59 | 15 FB | 1:49.90 | 12 |
| Tom Dolan | 400 m freestyle | 3:53.91 | 11 FB | DNS | |
| John Piersma | 400 m freestyle | 3:53.58 | 10 FB | 3:50.69 | 9 |
| Carlton Bruner | 1500 m freestyle | 15:25.82 | 13 | Did not advance | |
| Peter Wright | 1500 m freestyle | 15:25.43 | 12 | Did not advance | |
| Jeff Rouse | 100 m backstroke | 54.20 | 1 FA | 54.10 | 1st place, gold medalist(s) |
| Tripp Schwenk | 100 m backstroke | 55.71 | 5 FA | 55.30 | 5 |
| Brad Bridgewater | 200 m backstroke | 1:59.04 | 1 FA | 1:58.54 | 1st place, gold medalist(s) |
| Tripp Schwenk | 200 m backstroke | 1:59.58 | 2 FA | 1:58.99 | 2nd place, silver medalist(s) |
| Kurt Grote | 100 m breaststroke | 1:02.01 | 7 FA | 1:01.69 | 6 |
| Jeremy Linn | 100 m breaststroke | 1:01.53 | 2 FA | 1:00.77 AM | 2nd place, silver medalist(s) |
| Kurt Grote | 200 m breaststroke | 2:14.63 | 3 FA | 2:16.05 | 8 |
| Eric Wunderlich | 200 m breaststroke | 2:15.18 | 8 FA | 2:15.69 | 7 |
| John Hargis | 100 m butterfly | 54.06 | 17 FB | 54.29 | 16 |
| Mark Henderson | 100 m butterfly | 53.58 | 9 FB | 53.23 | =9 |
| Ray Carey | 200 m butterfly | 2:01.10 | 21 | Did not advance | |
| Tom Malchow | 200 m butterfly | 1:58.69 | 5 FA | 1:57.44 | 2nd place, silver medalist(s) |
| Greg Burgess | 200 m individual medley | 2:01.93 | 5 FA | 2:02.56 | 6 |
| Tom Dolan | 200 m individual medley | 2:01.99 | 6 FA | 2:03.89 | 7 |
| Tom Dolan | 400 m individual medley | 4:17.66 | 3 FA | 4:14.90 | 1st place, gold medalist(s) |
| Eric Namesnik | 400 m individual medley | 4:16.21 | 1 FA | 4:15.25 | 2nd place, silver medalist(s) |
| Josh Davis; David Fox^{[e]} Gary Hall Jr. Jon Olsen; Brad Schumacher; Scott Tucker^{[e]} | 4 × 100 m freestyle relay | 3:18.40 | 1 FA | 3:15.41 OR | 1st place, gold medalist(s) |
| Ryan Berube; Josh Davis; Joe Hudepohl; Jon Olsen^{[e]} Brad Schumacher | 4 × 200 m freestyle relay | 7:18.28 | 1 FA | 7:14.84 | 1st place, gold medalist(s) |
| Josh Davis^{[e]} Kurt Grote^{[e]} Gary Hall Jr. John Hargis^{[e]} Mark Henderson; Jeremy Linn; Jeff Rouse; Tripp Schwenk^{[e]} | 4 × 100 m medley relay | 3:39.93 | 1 FA | 3:34.84 WR | 1st place, gold medalist(s) |

Women

| Athlete | Event | Heat | | Final | |
| Athlete | Event | Time | Rank | Time | Rank |
|---|---|---|---|---|---|
| Angel Martino | 50 m freestyle | 25.47 | 4 FA | 25.31 | 4 |
| Amy Van Dyken | 50 m freestyle | 25.12 | 2 FA | 24.87 AM | 1st place, gold medalist(s) |
| Angel Martino | 100 m freestyle | 55.44 | 2 FA | 54.93 | 3rd place, bronze medalist(s) |
| Amy Van Dyken | 100 m freestyle | 55.94 | 5 FA | 55.11 | 4 |
| Trina Jackson | 200 m freestyle | 2:00.29 | 3 FA | 1:59.57 | 4 |
| Cristina Teuscher | 200 m freestyle | 2:00.57 | 6 FA | 2:00.79 | 6 |
| Janet Evans | 400 m freestyle | 4:13.60 | 9 FB | DNS | |
| Cristina Teuscher | 400 m freestyle | 4:12.20 | 7 FA | 4:14.21 | 8 |
| Brooke Bennett | 800 m freestyle | 8:32.38 | 1 FA | 8:27.89 | 1st place, gold medalist(s) |
| Janet Evans | 800 m freestyle | 8:38.08 | 6 FA | 8:38.91 | 6 |
| Beth Botsford | 100 m backstroke | 1:02.00 | 2 FA | 1:01.19 | 1st place, gold medalist(s) |
| Whitney Hedgepeth | 100 m backstroke | 1:01.70 | 1 FA | 1:01.47 | 2nd place, silver medalist(s) |
| Beth Botsford | 200 m backstroke | 2:14.16 | 9 FB | 2:13.48 | 10 |
| Whitney Hedgepeth | 200 m backstroke | 2:11.63 | 2 FA | 2:11.98 | 2nd place, silver medalist(s) |
| Amanda Beard | 100 m breaststroke | 1:09.04 | 2 FA | 1:08.09 AM | 2nd place, silver medalist(s) |
| Kristine Quance | 100 m breaststroke | 1:10.92 | 19 | Did not advance | |
| Amanda Beard | 200 m breaststroke | 2:28.10 | 2 FA | 2:25.75 | 2nd place, silver medalist(s) |
| Jilen Siroky | 200 m breaststroke | 2:31.57 | 13 FB | 2:33.43 | 15 |
| Angel Martino | 100 m butterfly | 59.31 | 1 FA | 59.23 | 3rd place, bronze medalist(s) |
| Amy Van Dyken | 100 m butterfly | 1:00.04 | 2 FA | 59.13 | 1st place, gold medalist(s) |
| Trina Jackson | 200 m butterfly | 2:12.69 | 7 FA | 2:11.96 | 8 |
| Annette Salmeen | 200 m butterfly | 2:14.69 | 15 FB | 2:13.64 | 12 |
| Kristine Quance | 200 m individual medley | 2:17.48 | =13 FB | 2:15.24 | 9 |
| Allison Wagner | 200 m individual medley | 2:16.32 | 5 FA | 2:16.43 | 6 |
| Whitney Metzler | 400 m individual medley | 4:44.74 | 6 FA | 4:46.20 | 8 |
| Allison Wagner | 400 m individual medley | 4:44.06 | 4 FA | 4:42.03 | 2nd place, silver medalist(s) |
| Catherine Fox; Lisa Jacob^{[e]} Angel Martino; Jenny Thompson; Amy Van Dyken; Melanie Valerio^{[e]} | 4 × 100 m freestyle relay | 3:42.36 | 1 FA | 3:39.29 OR | 1st place, gold medalist(s) |
| Lisa Jacob^{[e]} Trina Jackson; Annette Salmeen^{[e]} Sheila Taormina; Cristina Teuscher; Jenny Thompson; Ashley Whitney^{[e]} | 4 × 200 m freestyle relay | 8:04.99 OR | 1 FA | 7:59.87 OR | 1st place, gold medalist(s) |
| Amanda Beard; Beth Botsford; Catherine Fox^{[e]} Whitney Hedgepeth^{[e]} Angel Martino; Kristine Quance^{[e]} Jenny Thompson^{[e]} Amy Van Dyken | 4 × 100 m medley relay | 4:05.80 | 1 FA | 4:02.88 | 1st place, gold medalist(s) |

^{e} – Swimmer competed in the heat but not the final
Qualification legend: FA – Qualify to A final (medal); FB – Qualify to B final (non-medal)

== Synchronized swimming ==
| Athlete | Event | Technical | | Free | | Total | |
| Athlete | Event | Score | Rank | Score | Rank | Score | Rank |
|---|---|---|---|---|---|---|---|
| Suzannah Bianco; Tammy Cleland; Becky Dyroen-Lancer; Emily LeSueur; Heather Pease; Jill Savery; Nathalie Schneyder; Heather Simmons-Carrasco; Jill Sudduth; Margot Thien | Team | 34.720 | 1 | 65.000 | 1 | 99.720 | 1st place, gold medalist(s) |

== Table tennis ==
| Athlete | Event | Group stage | | | | Round of 16 | Quarterfinal | Semifinal | Final / BM | |
| Athlete | Event | Opposition Result | Opposition Result | Opposition Result | Rank | Opposition Result | Opposition Result | Opposition Result | Opposition Result | Rank |
|---|---|---|---|---|---|---|---|---|---|---|
| Jim Butler | Men's singles | D Mazunov (RUS); L 0–2 | Karlsson (SWE); L 1–2 | Hodžić (BIH); W 2–0 | 3 | Did not advance | | | | |
| David Zhuang | Men's singles | Huang (CAN); L 0–2 | Chen (GBR); L 1–2 | Olaleye (NGR); W 2–0 | 3 | Did not advance | | | | |
| Jim Butler; Todd Sweeris | Men's doubles | Lee / Yoo (KOR); L 0–2 | A Mazunov / D Mazunov (RUS); L 0–2 | Samsonov / Shchetinin (BLR); L 0–2 | 4 | —N/a | Did not advance | | | |
| Amy Feng | Women's singles | Liu (CHN); L 1–2 | Popova (SVK); W 2–0 | Rodríguez (CHI); W 2–0 | 2 | Did not advance | | | | |
| Lily Yip | Women's singles | Tóth (HUN); W 2–0 | Doti (BRA); W 2–0 | Chan (HKG); L 0–2 | 2 | Did not advance | | | | |
| Wei Wang; Lily Yip | Women's doubles | Noor / Vriesekoop (NED); W 2–1 | Kaffo / Oshonaike (NGR); W 2–1 | Palina / Timina (RUS); L 0–2 | 2 | —N/a | Did not advance | | | |

== Tennis ==
Men

| Athlete | Event | Round of 64 | Round of 32 | Round of 16 | Quarterfinal | Semifinal | Final / BM | |
| Athlete | Event | Opposition Result | Opposition Result | Opposition Result | Opposition Result | Opposition Result | Opposition Result | Rank |
|---|---|---|---|---|---|---|---|---|
| Andre Agassi | Singles | Björkman (SWE); W 7–6^{(8–6)}, 7–5^{(7–5)} | Kučera (SVK); W 6–4, 6–4 | Gaudenzi (ITA); W 2–6, 6–4, 6–2 | W Ferreira (RSA); W 7–5, 4–6, 7–5 | Paes (IND); W 7–6^{(7–5)}, 6–3 | Bruguera (ESP); W 6–2, 6–3, 6–1 | 1st place, gold medalist(s) |
| Richey Reneberg | Singles | Paes (IND); L 7–6^{(7–2)}, 6–7^{(7–9)}, 0–1 r | Did not advance | | | | | |
| MaliVai Washington | Singles | Krošlák (SVK); W 6–3, 7–6^{(7–3)} | Ogorodov (UZB); W 6–3, 6–4 | Carlsen (DEN); W 6–7^{(8–10)}, 6–0, 6–2 | Bruguera (ESP); L 6–7^{(8–10)}, 6–4, 5–7 | Did not advance | | |
| Andre Agassi; MaliVai Washington | Doubles | —N/a | Hernández / Órtiz (MEX); W 6–3, 4–6, 6–4 | E Ferreira / W Ferreira (RSA); L 5–7, 7–6^{(7–2)}, 0–6 | Did not advance | | | |

Women

| Athlete | Event | Round of 64 | Round of 32 | Round of 16 | Quarterfinal | Semifinal | Final / BM | |
| Athlete | Event | Opposition Result | Opposition Result | Opposition Result | Opposition Result | Opposition Result | Opposition Result | Rank |
|---|---|---|---|---|---|---|---|---|
| Lindsay Davenport | Singles | Kremer (LUX); W 6–2, 6–1 | Sawamatsu (JPN); W 6–2, 6–2 | Huber (GER); W 6–1, 3–6, 6–3 | Majoli (CRO); W 7–5, 6–3 | Fernández (USA); W 6–2, 7–6^{(8–6)} | Sánchez Vicario (ESP); W 7–6^{(10–8)}, 6–2 | 1st place, gold medalist(s) |
| Mary Joe Fernández | Singles | Likhovtseva (RUS); W 6–2, 6–4 | Wang (TPE); W 7–6^{(7–4)}, 2–6, 6–1 | Gorrochategui (ARG); W 6–0, 6–3 | Martínez (ESP); W 3–6, 6–2, 6–3 | Davenport (USA); L 2–6, 6–7^{(6–8)} | Bronze medal final Novotná (CZE); L 6–7^{(8–10)}, 4–6 | 4 |
| Monica Seles | Singles | Chen (CHN); W 6–0, 6–4 | Hy-Boulais (CAN); W 6–3, 6–2 | Sabatini (ARG); W 6–3, 6–3 | Novotná (CZE); L 5–7, 6–3, 6–8 | Did not advance | | |
| Gigi Fernández; Mary Joe Fernández | Doubles | —N/a | Bye | Pierce / Tauziat (FRA); W 6–4, 6–3 | Lake / Wood (GBR); W 6–2, 6–1 | Bollegraf / Schultz-McCarthy (NED); W 7–5, 7–6^{(7–3)} | Novotná / Suková (CZE); W 7–6^{(8–6)}, 6–4 | 1st place, gold medalist(s) |

== Volleyball ==
=== Beach ===
| Athlete | Event | First round | Second round | Third round | Fourth round | Elimination | | | | | Semifinal | Final / BM | |
| Athlete | Event | Opposition Result | Opposition Result | Opposition Result | Opposition Result | Opposition Result | Opposition Result | Opposition Result | Opposition Result | Opposition Result | Opposition Result | Opposition Result | Rank |
|---|---|---|---|---|---|---|---|---|---|---|---|---|---|
| Mike Dodd; Mike Whitmarsh | Men's | Bye | Prosser – Zahner (AUS); W 15–10 | de Melo – Rego (BRA); W 15–9 | Bosma – Jimenez (ESP); W 15–6 | Bye | | | | | Brenha – Maia (POR); W 15–13 | Kiraly – Steffes (USA); L 5–12, 8—12 | 2nd place, silver medalist(s) |
| Karch Kiraly; Kent Steffes | Men's | Bye | Ghiurghi – Grigolo (ITA); W 15–7 | Ahmann – Hager (GER); W 15–5 | Henkel – Smith (USA); W 17–15 | Bye | | | | | Child – Heese (CAN); W 15–11 | Dodd – Whitmarsh (USA); W 12–5, 12–8 | 1st place, gold medalist(s) |
| Carl Henkel; Sinjin Smith | Men's | Bye | Brenha – Maia (POR); W 15–7 | Alvarez – Rossell (CUB); W 15–13 | Kiraly – Steffes (USA); L 11–15 | Bye | | | | Brenha – Maia (POR); L 13–15 | Did not advance | | =5 |
| Barbra Fontana; Linda Hanley | Women's | Bye | Bernsten – Hestad (NOR); W 15–4 | Rodrigues – Samuel (BRA); L 10–15 | Did not advance | Bye | | Ishizaka – Nakano (JPN); W 15–6 | Fenwick – Spring (AUS); W 15–6 | McPeak – Reno (USA); W 15–10 | Pires – Silva (BRA); L 8–15 | Bronze medal match Cook – Pottharst (AUS); L 11–12, 7–12 | 4 |
| Gail Castro; Deb Richardson | Women's | Bye | Schoon-Kadijk – van de Ven (NED); W 15–8 | Cook – Pottharst (AUS); L 7–15 | Did not advance | Bye | | Fujita – Takahashi (JPN); L 11–15 | Did not advance | | | | =9 |
| Holly McPeak; Nancy Reno | Women's | Bye | Lesage – Prawerman (FRA); W 15–4 | Bühler – Müsch (GER); W 15–6 | Cook – Pottharst (AUS); L 13–15 | Bye | | | | Fontana – Hanley (USA); L 10–15 | Did not advance | | =5 |

=== Indoor ===
Summary

| Team | Event | Preliminary round | | | | | | Quarterfinal | Semifinal / Pl. | Final / BM / Pl. | |
| Team | Event | Opposition Result | Opposition Result | Opposition Result | Opposition Result | Opposition Result | Rank | Opposition Result | Opposition Result | Opposition Result | Rank |
|---|---|---|---|---|---|---|---|---|---|---|---|
| United States men | Men's tournament | Poland; W 3–0 | Argentina; W 3–0 | Cuba; L 2–3 | Brazil; L 0–3 | Bulgaria; L 2–3 | 5 | Did not advance | | | =9 |
| United States women | Women's tournament | Ukraine; W 3–0 | Netherlands; W 3–1 | China; L 1–3 | Japan; W 3–0 | South Korea; W 3–1 | 2 Q | Cuba; L 0–3 | 5-8 semifinal South Korea; L 0–3 | 7th place match Germany; W 3–1 | 7 |

==== Men's tournament ====
Roster

- Lloy Ball
- Bob Ctvrtlik
- Scott Fortune
- John Hyden
- Bryan Ivie
- Michael Lambert
- Dan Landry
- Jeff Nygaard
- Tom Sorensen
- Jeff Stork
- Ethan Watts
- Brett Winslow
- Head coach:
  Fred Strum

Preliminary round

| Pos | Team | Pld | W | L | Pts | SW | SL | SR | SPW | SPL | SPR | Qualification |
|---|---|---|---|---|---|---|---|---|---|---|---|---|
| 1 | Cuba | 5 | 4 | 1 | 9 | 12 | 5 | 2.400 | 233 | 191 | 1.220 | Quarterfinals |
| 2 | Brazil | 5 | 3 | 2 | 8 | 10 | 6 | 1.667 | 210 | 187 | 1.123 | Quarterfinals |
| 3 | Bulgaria | 5 | 3 | 2 | 8 | 10 | 8 | 1.250 | 225 | 212 | 1.061 | Quarterfinals |
| 4 | Argentina | 5 | 3 | 2 | 8 | 9 | 9 | 1.000 | 222 | 225 | 0.987 | Quarterfinals |
| 5 | United States | 5 | 2 | 3 | 7 | 10 | 9 | 1.111 | 241 | 233 | 1.034 | |
| 6 | Poland | 5 | 0 | 5 | 5 | 1 | 15 | 0.067 | 151 | 234 | 0.645 | |

| 21 July 1996 | United States | 3–0 | Poland |
| 21 July 1996 | (15–13, 15–6, 15–8) |

| 23 July 1996 | United States | 3–0 | Argentina |
| 23 July 1996 | (15–7, 15–8, 15–11) |

| 25 July 1996 | Cuba | 3–2 | United States |
| 25 July 1996 | (4–15, 15–9, 14–16, 15–8, 18–16) |

| 27 July 1996 | Brazil | 3–0 | United States |
| 27 July 1996 | (15–11, 15–11, 15–7) |

| 29 July 1996 | Bulgaria | 3–2 | United States |
| 29 July 1996 | (15–11, 13–15, 11–15, 15–5, 15–12) |

==== Women's tournament ====
Roster

- Tara Cross-Battle (c)
- Lori Endicott
- Caren Kemner
- Kristin Klein
- Beverly Oden
- Elaina Oden
- Danielle Scott
- Tammy June Webb
- Paula Weishoff
- Tonya Williams
- Elaine Youngs
- Yoko Zetterlund
- Head coach:
  Terry Liskevych

Preliminary round

| Pos | Team | Pld | W | L | Pts | SW | SL | SR | SPW | SPL | SPR | Qualification |
|---|---|---|---|---|---|---|---|---|---|---|---|---|
| 1 | China | 5 | 5 | 0 | 10 | 15 | 3 | 5.000 | 256 | 181 | 1.414 | Quarterfinals |
| 2 | United States | 5 | 4 | 1 | 9 | 13 | 5 | 2.600 | 241 | 198 | 1.217 | Quarterfinals |
| 3 | Netherlands | 5 | 3 | 2 | 8 | 10 | 7 | 1.429 | 211 | 179 | 1.179 | Quarterfinals |
| 4 | South Korea | 5 | 2 | 3 | 7 | 10 | 9 | 1.111 | 249 | 222 | 1.122 | Quarterfinals |
| 5 | Japan | 5 | 1 | 4 | 6 | 3 | 12 | 0.250 | 158 | 199 | 0.794 | |
| 6 | Ukraine | 5 | 0 | 5 | 5 | 0 | 15 | 0.000 | 89 | 225 | 0.396 | |

| 20 July 1996 | United States | 3–0 | Ukraine |
| 20 July 1996 | (15–8, 15–5, 15–11); Report |

| 22 July 1996 | Netherlands | 1–3 | United States |
| 22 July 1996 | (15–12, 10–15, 15–17, 7–15); Report |

| 24 July 1996 | United States | 1–3 | China |
| 24 July 1996 | (8–15, 2–15, 15–12, 12–15); Report |

| 26 July 1996 | United States | 3–0 | Japan |
| 26 July 1996 | (15–11 ,15–7, 15–12); Report |

| 28 July 1996 | South Korea | 1–3 | United States |
| 28 July 1996 | (15–10, 13–15, 9–15, 3–15); Report |

Quarterfinal

| 30 July 1996 | United States | 0–3 | Cuba |
| 30 July 1996 | (1–15, 10–15, 12–15); Report |

5th – 8th semifinal

| 31 July 1996 | United States | 0–3 | South Korea |
| 31 July 1996 | (12–15, 5–15, 11–15); Report |

7th place match

| 1 August 1996 | Germany | 1–3 | United States |
| 1 August 1996 | (16–17, 6–15, 15–5, 6–15); Report |

== Water polo ==
Summary

| Team | Event | Preliminary round | | | | | | Classification | | | Quarterfinal | Semifinal / Pl. | Final / BM / Pl. | |
| Team | Event | Opposition Result | Opposition Result | Opposition Result | Opposition Result | Opposition Result | Rank | Opposition Result | Opposition Result | Opposition Result | Opposition Result | Opposition Result | Opposition Result | Rank |
|---|---|---|---|---|---|---|---|---|---|---|---|---|---|---|
| United States men | Men's tournament | Italy; L 7–10 | Greece; W 9–7 | Ukraine; W 9–7 | Romania; W 10–5 | Croatia; W 10–8 | 2 Q | Bye | | | Spain; L 4–5 | 5-8 semifinal Greece; L 6–7 | 7th place match FR Yugoslavia; W 12–8 | 7 |

Roster
The following players represented the United States:

- Gavin Arroyo
- Troy Barnhart Jr.
- Chris Duplanty
- Mike Evans
- Kirk Everist
- Dan Hackett
- Chris Humbert
- Kyle Kopp
- Jeremy Laster
- Rick McNair
- Chris Oeding
- Alex Rousseau
- Wolf Wigo

Preliminary round

| Pos | Team | Pld | W | D | L | GF | GA | GD | Pts |
|---|---|---|---|---|---|---|---|---|---|
| 1 | Italy | 5 | 5 | 0 | 0 | 48 | 38 | +10 | 10 |
| 2 | United States | 5 | 4 | 0 | 1 | 45 | 37 | +8 | 8 |
| 3 | Croatia | 5 | 3 | 0 | 2 | 51 | 39 | +12 | 6 |
| 4 | Greece | 5 | 2 | 0 | 3 | 37 | 38 | −1 | 4 |
| 5 | Romania | 5 | 0 | 1 | 4 | 31 | 45 | −14 | 1 |
| 6 | Ukraine | 5 | 0 | 1 | 4 | 33 | 48 | −15 | 1 |

| 20 July 1996 | Italy | 10–7 | United States | Georgia Tech Aquatic Center |

| 21 July 1996 | United States | 9–7 | Greece | Georgia Tech Aquatic Center |

| 22 July 1996 | United States | 9–7 | Ukraine | Georgia Tech Aquatic Center |

| 23 July 1996 | United States | 10–5 | Romania | Georgia Tech Aquatic Center |

| 24 July 1996 | United States | 10–8 | Croatia | Georgia Tech Aquatic Center |

Quarterfinal

| 26 July 1996 | Spain | 5–4 | United States | Georgia Tech Aquatic Center |

5th-8th classification

| 27 July 1996 | Greece | 7–6 | United States | Georgia Tech Aquatic Center |

7th place match

| 28 July 1996 | United States | 12–8 | FR Yugoslavia | Georgia Tech Aquatic Center |

== Weightlifting ==
| Athlete | Event | Snatch | | Clean & jerk | | Total | |
| Athlete | Event | Weight | Rank | Weight | Rank | Weight | Rank |
|---|---|---|---|---|---|---|---|
| Bryan Jacob | –59 kg | 122.5 | 11 | 150.0 | =9 | 272.5 | 9 |
| Thanh Nguyen | –64 kg | 112.5 | 32 | 145.0 | =31 | 257.5 | 32 |
| Vernon Patao | –64 kg | 122.5 | =24 | 160.0 | =12 | 282.5 | 22 |
| Tim McRae | –70 kg | 145.0 | =11 | 177.5 | =12 | 322.5 | 14 |
| Tom Gough | –91 kg | 167.5 | =8 | 200.0 | =13 | 364.5 | 14 |
| Peter Kelley | –99 kg | 160.0 | =16 | 197.5 | 14 | 357.5 | 14 |
| Wes Barnett | –108 kg | 175.0 | =12 | 220.0 | =4 | 395.0 | 6 |
| Konstantine Starikovitch | –108 kg | 177.5 | =8 | 210.0 | =12 | 387.5 | 12 |
| Mark Henry | +108 kg | 175.0 | =13 | 202.5 | 15 | 377.5 | 14 |
| Thomas Ingalsbe | +108 kg | 165.0 | 17 | 200.0 | 16 | 365.0 | 16 |

== Wrestling ==
Key:

- TO – Victory by Fall.
- SP – Decision by technical superiority (10 points difference) – the loser with technical points
- ST – Decision by technical superiority (10 points difference) – the loser without technical points
- PP – Decision by Points – the loser with technical points.
- PO – Decision by Points – the loser without technical points.
- VA – Victory by injury.

| Athlete | Event | Round 1 | Round 2 | Round 3 | Semifinal | Repechage 1 | Repechage 2 | Repechage 3 | Repechage 4 | Bronze semifinal | Final / BM / Pl. | |
| Athlete | Event | Opposition Score | Opposition Score | Opposition Score | Opposition Score | Opposition Score | Opposition Score | Opposition Score | Opposition Score | Opposition Score | Opposition Score | Rank |
|---|---|---|---|---|---|---|---|---|---|---|---|---|
| Rob Eiter | Freestyle 48 kg | Ramírez (GUA); W 4–0^{ST} | Mkertchian (ARM); L 1–3^{PP} | Did not advance | | Bye | Tskouasseli (GRE); W 3–1^{PP} | Orujov (RUS); L 1–3^{PP} | Did not advance | | 7th place match Corduneanu (ROU); L 1–3^{PP} | 8 |
| Lou Rosselli | Freestyle 52 kg | Abdullayev (AZE); L 0–3^{PO} | Did not advance | | | Kardanov (GRE); W 3–1^{PP} | Corduneanu (ROU); W 3–1^{PP} | Woodcroft (CAN); L 0–4^{PA} | Did not advance | | | 11 |
| Kendall Cross | Freestyle 57 kg | Embalo (GBS); W 4–0^{ST} | Abe (JPN); W 3–1^{PP} | Bye | Ri (PRK); W 4–0^{ST} | Bye | | | | | Sissaouri (CAN); W 3–1^{PP} | 1st place, gold medalist(s) |
| Tom Brands | Freestyle 62 kg | Hajkenari (IRI); W 3–0^{PO} | Smal (BLR); W 3–0^{PO} | Bye | Azizov (RUS); W 3–1^{PP} | Bye | | | | | Jang (KOR); W 3–0^{PO} | 1st place, gold medalist(s) |
| Townsend Saunders | Freestyle 68 kg | Şanlı (TUR); W 3–1^{PP} | Roberts (CAN); W 3–1^{PP} | Bye | Gevorgyan (ARM); W 3–0^{PO} | Bye | | | | | Bogiyev (RUS); L 1–3^{PP} | 2nd place, silver medalist(s) |
| Kenny Monday | Freestyle 74 kg | Rodríguez (CUB); W 3–1^{PP} | Kertanti (SVK); W 3–1^{PP} | Bye | Saitiev (RUS); L 1–3^{PP} | Bye | | | | Ota (JPN); L 1–3^{PP} | 5th place match Leipold (GER); L 0–4^{PA} | 6 |
| Les Gutches | Freestyle 82 kg | Savko (BLR); W 3–1^{PP} | Hubrynyuk (UKR); W 3–0^{PO} | Zhabrailov (KAZ); L 1–3^{PP} | Did not advance | Bye | | | Ibragimov (AZE); L 1–3^{PP} | Did not advance | 7th place match Ramos (CUB); W 3–0^{PO} | 7 |
| Melvin Douglas | Freestyle 90 kg | Bye | Pauliukonis (LTU); W 3–0^{PO} | Khadartsev (RUS); L 1–3^{PP} | Did not advance | Bye | | Bayramukov (KAZ); W 3–0^{PO} | Kurtanidze (GEO); L 0–3^{PO} | Did not advance | 7th place match Kim (KOR); W 3–0^{PO} | 7 |
| Kurt Angle | Freestyle 100 kg | Sumiyaabazar (MGL); W 3–0^{PO} | Morales (CUB); W 3–0^{PO} | Murtazaliev (UKR); W 3–1^{PP} | Aleksandrov (KGZ); W 3–1^{PP} | Bye | | | | | Jadidi (IRI); W 3–1^{PP} | 1st place, gold medalist(s) |
| Bruce Baumgartner | Freestyle 130 kg | Borodow (CAN); W 4–0^{ST} | Shumilin (RUS); L 1–3^{PP} | Did not advance | | Bye | Turmanidze (GEO); W 4–1^{SP} | Gombos (HUN); W 4–0^{ST} | Bye | Thiele (GER); W 3–0^{PO} | Bronze medal match Shumilin (RUS); W 3–1^{PP} | 3rd place, bronze medalist(s) |
| Mujaahid Maynard | Greco-Roman 48 kg | Sánchez (CUB); L 1–3^{PP} | Did not advance | | | Ochoa (VEN); W 4–0^{TO} | Guliyev (RUS); L 0–3^{PP} | Did not advance | | | | 13 |
| Brandon Paulson | Greco-Roman 52 kg | Basaldua (PER); W 4–0^{TO} | Akhmedov (BLR); W 3–1^{PP} | Bye | Anev (BUL); W 3–1^{PP} | Bye | | | | | Nazaryan (ARM); L 1–3^{PP} | 2nd place, silver medalist(s) |
| Dennis Hall | Greco-Roman 57 kg | Eroğlu (TUR); W 3–0^{PO} | Park (KOR); W 3–1^{PP} | Bye | Sheng (CHN); W 3–0^{PO} | Bye | | | | | Melnichenko (KAZ); L 1–3^{PP} | 2nd place, silver medalist(s) |
| David Zuniga | Greco-Roman 62 kg | Robinson (CAN); W 3–1^{PP} | Radnev (BUL); L 1–3^{PP} | Did not advance | | Bye | Martynov (RUS); L 1–3^{PP} | Did not advance | | | | 10 |
| Rodney Smith | Greco-Roman 68 kg | Escobar (COL); W 3–1^{PP} | Karapınar (TUR); W 4–1^{SP} | Pulyaev (UZB); L 0–3^{PO} | Did not advance | Bye | | Colás (CUB); L 1–3^{PP} | Did not advance | | | 9 |
| Gordy Morgan | Greco-Roman 74 kg | Hernández (MEX); W 4–0^{ST} | Azcuy (CUB); L 1–3^{PP} | Did not advance | | Bye | Kim (KOR); L 1–3^{PP} | Did not advance | | | | 9 |
| Dan Henderson | Greco-Roman 82 kg | Frinta (CZE); W 3–1^{PP} | Lidgerg (SWE); L 1–3^{PP} | Did not advance | | Bye | Sanatbayev (KGZ); L 1–3^{PP} | Did not advance | | | | 12 |
| Derrick Waldroup | Greco-Roman 90 kg | Sidorenko (BLR); L 0–3^{PO} | Did not advance | | | Koskela (FIN); W 4–1^{SP} | Hodžić (BIH); W 4–0^{ST} | Gelénesi (HUN); W 3–0^{PO} | Bullmann (GER); L 0–3^{PO} | Did not advance | 7th place match Švec (CZE); W 3–1^{PP} | 7 |
| Jason Gleasman | Greco-Roman 100 kg | Ba (CHN); W 15–2 | Lishtvan (BLR); L 0–3 | Did not advance | | Bye | Edisherashvili (RUS); L 1–4 | Did not advance | | | | 12 |
| Matt Ghaffari | Greco-Roman 130 kg | Quizev (UZB); W 7–1 | Kotok (UKR)| W 3–0 | Bye | Schiekel (GER); W 4–0 | Bye | | | | | Karelin (RUS); L 0–1 | 2nd place, silver medalist(s) |

== See also ==
- United States at the 1995 Pan American Games

== Notes ==
- Watkins, Ginger T. (1997). The Official Report of the Centennial Olympic Games, Volume III The Competition Results (PDF). Atlanta: Peachtree Publishers. ISBN 1-56145-150-9. Archived from the original (PDF) on September 27, 2007.
