= Puerto Rico at the 1996 Summer Olympics =

- IOC code: PUR
- NOC: Puerto Rico Olympic Committee
- Website: www.copur.pr (in Spanish)

in Atlanta
- Competitors: 69 (47 men and 22 women) in 16 sports
- Flag bearer: Ivelisse Echevarría
- Medals Ranked 71st: Gold 0 Silver 0 Bronze 1 Total 1

Summer Olympics appearances (overview)
- 1948; 1952; 1956; 1960; 1964; 1968; 1972; 1976; 1980; 1984; 1988; 1992; 1996; 2000; 2004; 2008; 2012; 2016; 2020; 2024; 2028

Puerto Rico competed at the 1996 Summer Olympics in Atlanta, United States. This was their thirteenth appearance at the Olympics, after debuting in 1948. 69 competitors, 47 men and 22 women, took part in 60 events in 16 sports.

== Medalists ==
Medal	Name	Sport	Event	Date
Bronze	Daniel Santos	Boxing	Welterweight	August 1

== Competitors ==
The following is the list of number of competitors in the Games.

Sport	Men	Women	Total
Archery	0	1	1
Athletics	4	1	5
Basketball	12	0	12
Boxing	7	–	7
Cycling	1	0	1
Diving	1	1	2
Equestrian	1	0	1
Fencing	0	1	1
Gymnastics	1	1	2
Judo	4	0	4
Sailing	2	1	3
Shooting	2	0	2
Softball	–	15	15
Swimming	6	1	7
Weightlifting	1	–	1
Wrestling	5	–	5
Total	47	22	69

== Archery ==
In the fifth time the nation competed in archery at the Olympics, Puerto Rico entered one woman. She finished in last place.

Women

Athlete	Event	Ranking round		Round of 64	Round of 32	Round of 16	Quarterfinals	Semifinals	Final / BM	
Athlete	Event	Score	Seed	Opposition Score	Opposition Score	Opposition Score	Opposition Score	Opposition Score	Opposition Score	Rank
María Reyes	Individual	535	63	He (CHN); L 123–158	Did not advance					

== Athletics ==
Men
Track and road events

Athlete	Event	Heats		Quarterfinal		Semifinal		Final	
Athlete	Event	Result	Rank	Result	Rank	Result	Rank	Result	Rank
Maximo Oliveras	Marathon	—N/a						2:47:15	106
Mickey Soto	110 metres hurdles	13.94	42	Did not advance					
Domingo Cordero	400 metres hurdles	51.20	46	—N/a		Did not advance			

Field events

Athlete	Event	Qualification		Final	
Athlete	Event	Distance	Position	Distance	Position
Edgar Díaz	Pole vault	5.40	28	Did not advance	

Women
Track and road events

Athlete	Event	Heats		Quarterfinal		Semifinal		Final	
Athlete	Event	Result	Rank	Result	Rank	Result	Rank	Result	Rank
Myra Mayberry-Wilkinson	100 metres	11.51	30 Q	11.66	29	Did not advance			
Myra Mayberry-Wilkinson	200 metres	23.23	21 q	23.48	26	Did not advance			

== Basketball ==
Summary

Team	Event	Group stage						Quarterfinal	Semifinal	Final	
Team	Event	Opposition Result	Opposition Result	Opposition Result	Opposition Result	Opposition Result	Rank	Opposition Result	Opposition Result	Opposition Result	Rank
Puerto Rico men's	Men's tournament	Brazil; L 98–101	South Korea; W 98–86	Greece; L 69–80	Australia; L 96–101	FR Yugoslavia; L 86–97	5	—N/a	Angola; W 76–67	Argentina; L 77–87	10

=== Men's tournament ===
Preliminary round

Pos	Team	Pld	W	L	PF	PA	PD	Pts	Qualification
1	FR Yugoslavia	5	5	0	478	364	+114	10	Quarterfinals
2	Australia	5	4	1	492	438	+54	9	Quarterfinals
3	Greece	5	3	2	402	416	−14	8	Quarterfinals
4	Brazil	5	2	3	498	494	+4	7	Quarterfinals
5	Puerto Rico	5	1	4	447	465	−18	6	9th place playoff
6	South Korea	5	0	5	422	562	−140	5	11th place playoff

Source: FIBA archive
Rules for classification: 1) points; 2) head-to-head points; 3) head-to-head goal average; 4) head-to-head number of points scored.

20 July 1996

Report

Puerto Rico	98–101	Brazil
Scoring by half: 54–58, 44–43
Pts: Ortiz 35; Rebs: Ortiz 11; Asts: Mincy 7		Pts: Schmidt 45; Rebs: Vianna 8 Asts: Ratto 10

Atlanta
Referees: Pascal Noel Dorizon (FRA), Romualdas Brazauskas (LTU)

22 July 1996

Report

South Korea	86–98	Puerto Rico
Scoring by half: 52–51, 34–47
Pts: K. E. Moon 20; Rebs: J. Y. Hyun 11; Asts: Hur Jae 12		Pts: Ortiz 37; Rebs: Ortiz 14; Asts: Alicea 10

Atlanta
Referees: Roman Ryzhyk (UKR), Antonio Soares De Campos (ANG)

24 July 1996

Report

Greece	80–69	Puerto Rico
Scoring by half: 51–33, 29–36
Pts: Oikonomou 19; Rebs: Oikonomou 8 Asts: Oikonomou, Christodoulou 3		Pts: Mincy 20; Rebs: Mincy 8 Asts: Ortíz 4

Atlanta
Referees: Gennaro Colucci ITA, Raul Chaves Sagel (ARG)

26 July 1996

Report

Puerto Rico	96–101	Australia
Scoring by half: 53–51, 43–50
Pts: Ortíz 30; Rebs: Ortíz 11; Asts: Rivera 7		Pts: Gaze 29; Rebs: Fisher, Bradtke 6 Asts: Heal 7

Atlanta
Referees: Miguel Betancor Leon (ESP), Jose Lapaix Guance (DOM)

28 July 1996

Report

FR Yugoslavia	97–86	Puerto Rico
Scoring by half: 45–34, 52–52
Pts: Danilović 22; Rebs: Divac 10; Asts: Đorđević 7		Pts: Ortiz 20; Rebs: Ortiz 11; Asts: Rivera 9

Atlanta
Referees: Donald Cline (CAN), Serguei Boulanov (RUS)

9–12th Place classification match

30 July 1996
17:00

Report

Puerto Rico	76–67	Angola
Scoring by half: 38–36, 38–31
Pts: Ortiz 19; Rebs: Rivas 7 Asts: Alicea 5		Pts: Moreira 15; Rebs: Dias 11; Asts: Moreira 6

Atlanta
Referees: Roman Ryzhyk (UKR), Jose Reyes Ronfini (MEX)

9th Place match

2 August 1996
12:00

Report

Argentina	87–77	Puerto Rico
Scoring by half: 43–38, 44–39
Pts: Espil, Osella 17; Rebs: Milanesio, Oberto 7 Asts: Milanesio, Espil 7		Pts: Ortiz 21; Rebs: Ortiz 11; Asts: Travieso 5

Atlanta
Referees: Davorin Nakic (CRO), Antonio Soares De Campos (ANG)

== Boxing ==
Athlete	Event	Round of 32	Round of 16	Quarterfinals	Semifinals	Final	
Athlete	Event	Opposition Result	Opposition Result	Opposition Result	Opposition Result	Opposition Result	Rank
Omar Adorno	Flyweight	Samoilenco (MDA); L 8–20	Did not advance				
José Cotto	Bantamweight	Malakhbekov (RUS); L 6–16	Did not advance				
Luís Seda	Featherweight	Kamsing (THA); L 2–13	Did not advance				
Luis Deines Pérez	Light welterweight	Bielski (POL); L 2–18	Did not advance				
Daniel Santos	Welterweight	Atangana Mboa (CMR); W RSC R1	Lahsen (MAR); W 16–4	Ataev (UZB); W 28–15	Saitov (RUS); L 11–13	Did not advance	3rd place, bronze medalist(s)
José Luis Quiñones	Light middleweight	Perugino (ITA); L 8–10	Did not advance				
Enrique Flores	Light heavyweight	Singh (IND); W 15–7	Botes (RSA); W 16–7	Tarver (USA); L RSC R3	Did not advance		

== Cycling ==
=== Track ===
Points race

Athlete	Event	Laps	Points	Rank
Juan Merheb	Men's points race	DNF		

== Diving ==
Men

Athlete	Event	Preliminary		Semifinal		Final	
Athlete	Event	Points	Rank	Points	Rank	Points	Rank
Ramon Sandin	3 metre springboard	302.55	29	Did not advance			

Women

Athlete	Event	Preliminary		Semifinal		Final	
Athlete	Event	Points	Rank	Points	Rank	Points	Rank
Vivián Alberty	3 metre springboard	195.18	27	Did not advance			

== Equestrianism ==
=== Jumping ===
Athlete	Horse	Event	Qualification								Final					
Athlete	Horse	Event	Round 1		Round 2		Round 3		Total		Round 1		Round 2		Total	
Athlete	Horse	Event	Score	Rank	Score	Rank	Score	Rank	Score	Rank	Penalties	Rank	Penalties	Rank	Penalties	Rank
Alexander Earle	Same Old Song	Individual	DQ								Did not advance					

== Fencing ==
One female fencer represented Puerto Rico in 1996.

Women

Athlete	Event	Round of 64	Round of 32	Round of 16	Quarterfinals	Semifinals	Final	
Athlete	Event	Opposition Result	Opposition Result	Opposition Result	Opposition Result	Opposition Result	Opposition Result	Rank
Mitch Escanellas	Épée	Mazina (RUS); L 11–15	Did not advance					

== Gymnastics ==
=== Artistic ===
==== Men ====
Athlete	Event	Qualification							
Athlete	Event	Apparatus						Total	Rank
Athlete	Event	F	PH	R	V	PB	HB	Total	Rank
Diego Lizardi	Individual	18.500	16.475	17.575	18.837	15.850	17.175	104.412	67

==== Women ====
Athlete	Event	Qualification					
Athlete	Event	Apparatus				Total	Rank
Athlete	Event	V	UB	BB	F	Total	Rank
Eileen Díaz	Individual	16.625	18.424	17.099	17.400	69.548	73

== Judo ==
Men

Athlete	Event	Round of 64	Round of 32	Round of 16	Quarterfinals	Semifinals	Repechage			Final	
Athlete	Event	Round of 64	Round of 32	Round of 16	Quarterfinals	Semifinals	Round 1	Round 2	Round 3	Final	
Athlete	Event	Opposition Result	Opposition Result	Opposition Result	Opposition Result	Opposition Result	Opposition Result	Opposition Result	Opposition Result	Opposition Result	Rank
Melvin Méndez	–60 kg	Bye	Narmandakh (MGL); L	Did not advance			Donohue (GBR); L	Did not advance			
José Pérez	–65 kg	Almeida (POR); L	Did not advance								
Francisco Rodríguez	–71 kg	Bye	Harkat (ALG); L	Did not advance							
José Figueroa	–78 kg	Bye	Klas (NED); L	Did not advance							

== Sailing ==
Men

Athlete	Event	Race										Net points	Final rank
Athlete	Event	1	2	3	4	5	6	7	8	9	10	Net points	Final rank
Matt Anderson	Mistral One Design	~~39~~	32	37	35	24	~~47~~	26	34	23	—N/a	211	35
Manuel Méndez	Finn	24	30	30	29	28	30	29	~~32~~	~~31~~	29	229	30

Women

Athlete	Event	Race									Net points	Final rank
Athlete	Event	1	2	3	4	5	6	7	8	9	Net points	Final rank
Lucía Martínez	Mistral One Design	16	17	12	20	19	18	~~28~~	~~23~~	15	117	19

== Shooting ==
Men

Athlete	Event	Qualification		Final	
Athlete	Event	Points	Rank	Points	Rank
José Artecona	Trap	114	49	Did not advance	
José Artecona	Double trap	120	33	Did not advance	
Ralph Rodríguez	50 metre rifle prone	588	47	Did not advance	

== Softball ==
Summary

Team	Event	Round robin								Semi-final	Bronze medal game	Gold medal game	
Team	Event	Opposition Result	Opposition Result	Opposition Result	Opposition Result	Opposition Result	Opposition Result	Opposition Result	Rank	Opposition Result	Opposition Result	Opposition Result	Rank
Puerto Rico women's	Women's tournament	United States; L 0–10	Canada; L 0–4	Australia; W 2–0	China; L 0–10	Chinese Taipei; L 2–10	Japan; L 1–8	Netherlands; L 0–2	8	Did not advance			

Team roster

- Lourdes Baez
- Sheree Corniel
- Ivelisse Echevarría
- Maria González
- Elba Lebrón
- Lisa Martínez
- Aída Miranda
- Lisa Mize
- Jacqueline Ortiz
- Janice Parks
- Penelope Rosario
- Sandra Rosario
- Myriam Segarra
- Eve Soto
- Clara Vázquez
- Head coach: José Agosto

Group play

Team	W	L	RS	RA	WIN%	GB	Tiebreaker
United States	6	1	37	7	.857	-	-
China	5	2	29	9	.714	1	3 RA vs. AUS/JPN
Australia	5	2	22	11	.714	1	6 RA vs. CHN/JPN
Japan	5	2	24	18	.714	1	10 RA vs. CHN/AUS
Canada	3	4	15	17	.429	3	-
Chinese Taipei	2	5	19	19	.286	4	-
Netherlands	1	6	4	32	.143	5	1–0 vs. PUR
Puerto Rico	1	6	5	44	.143	5	0–1 vs. NED

Team	1	2	3	4	5	6	R	H	E
Puerto Rico	0	0	0	0	0	0	0	2	3
United States	2	0	3	0	0	5	10	13	0
WP: Granger (1–0) LP: Martinez (0–1)

Team	1	2	3	4	5	6	7	R	H	E
Puerto Rico	0	0	0	0	0	0	0	0	2	1
Canada	0	0	0	0	0	4	–	4	4	0
WP: Snelgrove (1–0) LP: Echevarría (0–1)

Team	1	2	3	4	5	6	7	R	H	E
Australia	0	0	0	0	0	0	0	0	2	1
Puerto Rico	0	2	0	0	0	0	–	2	2	1
WP: Echevarría (1–1) LP: Wilkins (0–1)

Team	1	2	3	4	5	R	H	E
China	0	5	1	4	0	10	11	0
Puerto Rico	0	0	0	0	0	0	1	5
WP: Ma (1–0) LP: Mize (0–1)

Team	1	2	3	4	5	6	7	R	H	E
Puerto Rico	1	1	0	0	0	0	0	2	6	0
Chinese Taipei	0	1	0	0	9	0	–	10	11	1
WP: Tu HM (2–1) LP: Echevarría (1–2)

Team	1	2	3	4	5	6	7	R	H	E
Japan	0	0	1	4	0	2	1	8	12	1
Puerto Rico	0	0	0	0	0	1	0	1	3	0
WP: Takayama (3–0) LP: Martinez (0–2)

Team	1	2	3	4	5	6	7	R	H	E
Netherlands	0	0	0	2	0	0	0	2	8	1
Puerto Rico	0	0	0	0	0	0	0	0	3	3
WP: Mels (1–4) LP: Echevarría (1–3)

== Swimming ==
Men

Athlete	Event	Heats		Final A/B	
Athlete	Event	Time	Rank	Time	Rank
Ricardo Busquets	50 m freestyle	22.61	5 FA	22.73	8
Ricardo Busquets	100 m freestyle	49.61	5 FA	49.68	7
Ricardo Busquets	100 m butterfly	53.90	13 FB	53.65	12
Arsenio López	200 m individual medley	2:07.09	27	Did not advance	
Arsenio López	400 m individual medley	4:34.81	25	Did not advance	
Todd Torres	100 m breaststroke	1:03.08	21	Did not advance	
Todd Torres	200 m breaststroke	2:22.66	31	Did not advance	
Ricardo Busquets; Eduardo González; José González; Arsenio López	4 × 100 m freestyle relay	3:28.27	16	Did not advance	
Carlos Bodega; Ricardo Busquets; José González; Todd Torres	4 × 100 m medley relay	3:52.04	19	Did not advance	

Women

Athlete	Event	Heats		Final A/B	
Athlete	Event	Time	Rank	Time	Rank
Sonia Álvarez	200 m butterfly	2:25.24	35	Did not advance	
Sonia Álvarez	200 m individual medley	2:25.57	37	Did not advance	

== Weightlifting ==
Athlete	Event	Snatch		Clean & jerk		Total	Rank
Athlete	Event	Result	Rank	Result	Rank	Total	Rank
César Rodríguez	–59 kg	110.0	15	132.5	14	242.5	13

== Wrestling ==
Greco-Roman

Athlete	Event	Round of 32	Round of 16	Quarterfinals	Semifinals	Repechage					Final	
Athlete	Event	Round of 32	Round of 16	Quarterfinals	Semifinals	Round 1	Round 2	Round 3	Round 4	Round 5	Final	
Athlete	Event	Opposition Result	Opposition Result	Opposition Result	Opposition Result	Opposition Result	Opposition Result	Opposition Result	Opposition Result	Opposition Result	Opposition Result	Rank
Marco Sánchez	–62 kg	Aziz (SWE); L 5–6	Did not advance			Hu (CHN); L 3–8	Did not advance					

Freestyle

Athlete	Event	Round of 32	Round of 16	Quarterfinals	Semifinals	Repechage					Final	
Athlete	Event	Round of 32	Round of 16	Quarterfinals	Semifinals	Round 1	Round 2	Round 3	Round 4	Round 5	Final	
Athlete	Event	Opposition Result	Opposition Result	Opposition Result	Opposition Result	Opposition Result	Opposition Result	Opposition Result	Opposition Result	Opposition Result	Opposition Result	Rank
Anibál Nieves	–62 kg	Demeter (HUN); L 0–3	Did not advance			Hajkenari (IRI); W 8–3	Calder (CAN); L 0–3	Did not advance				
Orlando Rosa	–82 kg	Hubrynyuk (UKR); L 1–3	Did not advance			Ghiță (ROU); L 3–4	Did not advance					
José Betancourt	–90 kg	Gantogtokh (MGL); L 0–5	Did not advance			Kodei (NGR); L 0–10	Did not advance					
Daniel Sánchez	–100 kg	Aavik (EST); L Fall	Did not advance			Tkeshelashvili (GEO); L 2–3	Did not advance					

== See also ==
- Puerto Rico at the 1995 Pan American Games

== Notes ==
- Watkins, Ginger T., ed. (1997). The Official Report of the Centennial Olympic Games, Volume III The Competition Results (PDF). Atlanta: Peachtree Publishers. ISBN 1-56145-150-9.
- "Olympic Medal Winners". International Olympic Committee.
