= Nigeria at the 1996 Summer Olympics =

- IOC code: NGR
- NOC: Nigeria Olympic Committee
- Website: www.nigeriaolympiccommittee.org

in Atlanta
- Competitors: 65 in 9 sports
- Flag bearer: Mary Onyali
- Medals Ranked 32nd: Gold 2 Silver 1 Bronze 3 Total 6

Summer Olympics appearances (overview)
- 1952; 1956; 1960; 1964; 1968; 1972; 1976; 1980; 1984; 1988; 1992; 1996; 2000; 2004; 2008; 2012; 2016; 2020; 2024; 2028

Nigeria competed at the 1996 Summer Olympics in Atlanta, United States. The most surprising achievement was Nigeria's gold in football. The team overcame what are usually considered much stronger teams, such as Brazil and finally Argentina to earn the gold.

== Medalists ==
Medal	Name	Sport	Event	Date
Gold	Chioma Ajunwa	Athletics	Women's long jump	2 August
Gold	Nigeria national under-23 football team: Celestine Babayaro; Taribo West; Nwankwo Kanu; Uche Okechukwu; Emmanuel Amunike; Tijani Babangida; Wilson Oruma; Teslim Fatusi; Jay-Jay Okocha; Victor Ikpeba; Abiodun Obafemi; Garba Lawal; Daniel Amokachi; Sunday Oliseh; Mobi Oparaku; Elvis Chizoba Acha	Football	Men's tournament	3 August
Silver	Bisi Afolabi; Fatima Yusuf; Charity Opara; Falilat Ogunkoya	Athletics	Women's 4 × 400 metres relay	3 August
Bronze	Falilat Ogunkoya	Athletics	Women's 400 metres	29 July
Bronze	Mary Onyali	Athletics	Women's 200 metres	1 August
Bronze	Duncan Dokiwari	Boxing	Super heavyweight	2 August

== Competitors ==
The following is the list of number of competitors in the Games.

Sport	Men	Women	Total
Athletics	19	13	32
Badminton	1	1	2
Boxing	4	–	4
Football	16	0	16
Judo	1	0	1
Table tennis	2	2	4
Tennis	1	0	1
Weightlifting	1	–	1
Wrestling	4	–	4
Total	49	16	65

== Results by event ==
=== Athletics ===
==== Men ====
Track and road events

Athletes	Events	Heat Round 1		Heat Round 2		Semifinal		Final	
Athletes	Events	Time	Rank	Time	Rank	Time	Rank	Time	Rank
Olapade Adeniken	100 metres	10.41	39 Q	10.38	31	Did not advance			
Deji Aliu	100 metres	10.34	27 Q	10.26	19	Did not advance			
Davidson Ezinwa	100 metres	10.03	1 Q	10.08	6 Q	10.04	6 Q	10.14	6
Francis Obikwelu	200 metres	20.62	17 Q	20.49	10 Q	20.56	12	Did not advance	
Seun Ogunkoya	200 metres	20.78	29 Q	21.00	33	Did not advance			
Sunday Bada	400 metres	45.19	3 Q	44.88	6 Q	45.30	10	Did not advance	
Clement Chukwu	400 metres	45.18	2 Q	45.24	17	Did not advance			
Jude Monye	400 metres	46.10	30 q	Did not finish		Did not advance			
Steve Adegbite	110 metres hurdles	14.06	49	Did not advance					
William Erese	110 metres hurdles	13.98	43	Did not advance					
Moses Oyiki	110 metres hurdles	14.04	48	Did not advance					
Kehinde Aladefa	400 metres hurdles	49.60	23	N/A		Did not advance			
Deji Aliu; Davidson Ezinwa; Osmond Ezinwa; Francis Obikwelu	4 x 100 metres relay	39.47	15 q	N/A		Did not finish		Did not advance	
Sunday Bada; Clement Chukwu; Udeme Ekpenyong; Ayuba Machem	4 x 400 metres relay	3:02.73	7 q	N/A		Disqualified		Did not advance	

Field events

Athlete	Event	Qualification		Final	
Athlete	Event	Result	Rank	Result	Rank
Festus Igbinoghene	Triple jump	15.95	35	Did not advance	
Chima Ugwu	Shot put	18.39	25	Did not advance	
Adewale Olukoju	Discus throw	60.98	17	Did not advance	
Pius Bazighe	Javelin throw	70.78	32	Did not advance	

==== Women ====
Track and road events

Athletes	Events	Heat Round 1		Heat Round 2		Semifinal		Final	
Athletes	Events	Time	Rank	Time	Rank	Time	Rank	Time	Rank
Chioma Ajunwa	100 metres	11.25	12 Q	11.24	12 Q	11.14	10	Did not advance	
Mary Tombiri	100 metres	11.50	29 Q	11.56	27	Did not advance			
Mary Onyali	100 metres	11.17	6 Q	11.08	3 Q	11.04	4 Q	11.13	7
Mary Onyali	200 metres	22.42	2 Q	22.37	2 Q	22.16	3 Q	22.38	Bronze medal
Calister Ubah	200 metres	23.34	27 q	23.62	29	Did not advance			
Bisi Afolabi	400 metres	51.80	11 Q	51.07	7 Q	51.40	13	Did not advance	
Falilat Ogunkoya	400 metres	52.65	30 Q	50.65	3 Q	49.57	2 Q	49.10	Bronze medal
Fatima Yusuf	400 metres	52.25	21 Q	51.27	12 Q	50.36	6 Q	49.77	6
Ime Akpan	100 metres hurdles	13.11	24 Q	13.02	22	Did not advance			
Taiwo Aladefa	100 metres hurdles	13.06	21 Q	13.11	26	Did not advance			
Angela Atede	100 metres hurdles	12.88	10 Q	12.85	18	Did not advance			
Lade Akinremi	400 metres hurdles	56.83	23	N/A		Did not advance			
Chioma Ajunwa; Mary Onyali; Christy Opara; Mary Tombiri	4 x 100 metres relay	43.54	5 Q	N/A				42.56	5
Bisi Afolabi; Falilat Ogunkoya; Charity Opara; Fatima Yusuf	4 x 400 metres relay	3:23.24	2 Q	N/A				3:21.04	Silver medal

Field events

Athlete	Event	Qualification		Final	
Athlete	Event	Result	Rank	Result	Rank
Chioma Ajunwa	Long jump	6.81	2 Q	7.12	Gold medal

=== Badminton ===
Men

Athlete	Event	Round of 64		Round of 32		Round of 16		Quarterfinals		Semifinals		Final		
Athlete	Event	Opposition	Score	Opposition	Score	Opposition	Score	Opposition	Score	Opposition	Score	Opposition	Score	Rank
Kayode Akinsanya	Singles	Stuer-Lauridsen (DEN)	L 0-15 2-15	Did not advance										

Women

Athlete	Event	Round of 64		Round of 32		Round of 16		Quarterfinals		Semifinals		Final		
Athlete	Event	Opposition	Score	Opposition	Score	Opposition	Score	Opposition	Score	Opposition	Score	Opposition	Score	Rank
Obiageli Olorunsola	Singles	bye		Bang (KOR)	L 0-15 0-15	Did not advance								

Mixed

Athlete	Event	Round of 64		Round of 32		Round of 16		Quarterfinals		Semifinals		Final		
Athlete	Event	Opposition	Score	Opposition	Score	Opposition	Score	Opposition	Score	Opposition	Score	Opposition	Score	Rank
Obiageli Olorunsola; Kayode Akinsanya	Doubles	N/A		(Denmark) Olsen, Jakobsen (DEN)	L 1-15 2-15	Did not advance								

=== Boxing ===
Athlete	Event	Round of 32	Round of 16	Quarterfinal	Semifinal	Final
Athlete	Event	Opposition Result	Opposition Result	Opposition Result	Opposition Result	Opposition Result
Kehinde Aweda	Bantamweight	Khasanov (TJK); L 20-10	Did not advance			
Daniel Attah	Featherweight	Ipera (PNG); W 14-2	Nagy (HUN); L 14-12	Did not advance		
Albert Eromosele	Light-middleweight	Horodnichov (UKR); L 18-4	Did not advance			
Duncan Dokiwari	Super-heavyweight	Samadi (IRI); W RSC	Khan (PAK); W RSC	Məmmədov (AZE); W RSC	Wolfgramm (TGA); L 7-6	Did not advance

=== Football ===
==== Men's Tournament ====
Group Stage – Group C

Team	Pld	W	D	L	GF	GA	GD	Pts
Brazil	3	2	0	1	4	2	+2	6
Nigeria	3	2	0	1	3	1	+2	6
Japan	3	2	0	1	4	4	0	6
Hungary	3	0	0	3	3	7	−4	0

July 21, 1996
18.30

Nigeria	1 – 0	Hungary
Kanu 44'	Report

Citrus Bowl, Orlando
Attendance: 25,303
Referee: Un-Prasert (THA)

July 23, 1996
20.30

Nigeria	2 – 0	Japan
Babangida 82'; Okocha 90' (pen.)	Report

Citrus Bowl, Orlando
Attendance: 22,734
Referee: Collina (ITA)

July 25, 1996
21.00

Brazil	1 – 0	Nigeria
Ronaldo 30'	Report

Orange Bowl, Miami
Attendance: 55,650
Referee: Esfandiar Baharmast (USA)

Quarterfinal

July 28, 1996
16:00

Mexico	0 – 2	Nigeria
	Report	Okocha 20'; C. Babayaro 84'

Legion Field, Birmingham
Attendance: 44,788
Referee: Al Mehannah (KSA)

Semifinal

July 31, 1996
18:00

Nigeria	4 – 3 (ASDET)	Brazil
Roberto Carlos 20' (o.g.); Ikpeba 78'; Kanu 90', 94'	Report	Flavio Conceição 1', 38'; Bebeto 28'

Sanford Stadium, Athens
Attendance: 78,587
Referee: Garcia Aranda (ESP)

Gold medal match

August 3, 1996
15:45

Nigeria	3 – 2	Argentina
Babayaro 28'; Amokachi 74'; Amuneke 90'	Report	C. López 3'; Crespo 50' (pen.)

Sanford Stadium, Athens
Attendance: 86,117
Referee: Collina (ITA)

Team roster

- Celestine Babayaro
- Taribo West
- Nwankwo Kanu
- Uche Okechukwu
- Emmanuel Amunike
- Tijani Babangida
- Wilson Oruma
- Teslim Fatusi
- Jay-Jay Okocha
- Victor Ikpeba
- Abiodun Obafemi
- Garba Lawal
- Daniel Amokachi
- Sunday Oliseh
- Mobi Oparaku
- Joseph Dosu

=== Judo ===
Men

Athlete	Event	Result
Suleman Musa	Half-Middleweight	21

=== Table Tennis ===
==== Men's Singles Tournament ====
Group Stage - Group M

Team	Pld	W	L	GW	GL	PW	PL
Wenguan Johnny Huang (CAN)	3	3	0	6	0	126	76
Chen Xinhua (GBR)	3	2	1	4	4	142	145
David Zhuang (USA)	3	1	2	3	4	122	126
Sule Olaleye (NGR)	3	0	3	1	6	102	145

Group Stage - Group P

Team	Pld	W	L	GW	GL	PW	PL
Patrick Chila (FRA)	3	3	0	6	2	158	120
Konstantinos Kreanga (GRE)	3	2	1	5	2	133	114
Segun Toriola (NGR)	3	1	2	2	5	98	133
Chetan Baboor (IND)	3	0	3	2	6	132	154

==== Men's Doubles Tournament ====
Group Stage - Group H

Team	Pld	W	L	GW	GL	PW	PL
(Japan) Koji Matsushita / Hiroshi Shibutani	3	3	0	6	0	129	95
(Serbia and Montenegro) Slobodan Grujić / Ilija Lupulesku	3	2	1	4	2	117	115
(Nigeria) Sule Olaleye / Segun Toriola	3	1	2	2	4	114	115
(Czech Republic) Petr Korbel / Josef Plachy	3	0	3	0	6	94	129

==== Women's Singles Tournament ====
Group Stage - Group I

Team	Pld	W	L	GW	GL	PW	PL
Kim Hyon-Hui (PRK)	3	3	0	6	0	128	100
Jie Schöpp (GER)	3	2	1	4	2	120	88
Elena Timina (RUS)	3	1	2	2	4	108	113
Funke Oshonaike (NGR)	3	0	3	0	6	71	126

Group Stage - Group P

Team	Pld	W	L	GW	GL	PW	PL
Dai-Yong Tu (SUI)	3	3	0	6	1	148	95
Lyanne Kosaka (BRA)	3	2	1	4	2	99	105
Emilia Ciosu (ROU)	3	1	2	3	5	151	157
Bose Kaffo (NGR)	3	0	3	1	6	103	144

==== Men's Doubles Tournament ====
Group Stage - Group H

Team	Pld	W	L	GW	GL	PW	PL
(Russia) Irina Palina / Elena Timina	3	3	0	6	0	126	75
(United States) Wei Wang / Lily Yip	3	2	1	4	4	130	137
(Netherlands) Emily Noor / Huberta Vriesekoop	3	1	2	3	4	122	131
(Nigeria) Bose Kaffo / Olufunke Oshonaike	3	0	3	1	6	102	136

=== Tennis ===
Men

Athlete	Event	Round of 64		Round of 32		Round of 16		Quarterfinals		Semifinals		Final		
Athlete	Event	Opposition	Score	Opposition	Score	Opposition	Score	Opposition	Score	Opposition	Score	Opposition	Score	Rank
Sule Ladipo	Singles	Stoltenberg (AUS)	L 6^{4}-7^{7} 3-6	Did not advance										

=== Weightlifting ===
Athletes	Events	Snatch		Clean & Jerk		Total	Rank
Athletes	Events	Result	Rank	Result	Rank	Total	Rank
Mojisola Oluwa	-70 kg	140.0	18	170.0	=17	310.0	18

=== Wrestling ===
Greco-Roman

Athlete	Event	Round 1	Round 2	Quarterfinal	Semifinal	Final	Repechage Round 1	Repechage Round 2	Repechage Round 3	Repechage Round 4	Repechage Round 5	Bronze Medal Bout
Athlete	Event	Opposition Result	Opposition Result	Opposition Result	Opposition Result	Opposition Result	Opposition Result	Opposition Result	Opposition Result	Opposition Result	Opposition Result	Opposition Result
Tiebiri Godswill	-52 kg	Anev (BUL); L 11-0	Did not advance				N/A	Vartanovas (LTU); L 4-0	Did not advance			

Freestyle

Athlete	Event	Round 1	Round 2	Quarterfinal	Semifinal	Final	Repechage Round 1	Repechage Round 2	Repechage Round 3	Repechage Round 4	Repechage Round 5	Bronze Medal Bout
Athlete	Event	Opposition Result	Opposition Result	Opposition Result	Opposition Result	Opposition Result	Opposition Result	Opposition Result	Opposition Result	Opposition Result	Opposition Result	Opposition Result
Isaac Jacob	-48 kg	Vila (CUB); L 4-0	Did not advance				Ramírez (GUA); W 3-0	Torgovkin (KGZ); W Default	Corduneanu (ROU); L 7-6	Did not advance		
Ibo Oziti	-68 kg	Zazirov (UKR); L 11-0	Did not advance				Fallah (IRI); L 1-0	Did not advance				
Victor Kodei	-90 kg	Khadem (IRI); L 6-1	Did not advance				Betancourt (PUR); W 10-0	Bianco (CAN); W 7-0	Bacsa (HUN); W 7-4	Kim (KOR); W 7-0	Lohyňa (SVK); L 10-0	Tedieiev (UKR); L Fall

== See also ==
- Nigeria at the 1994 Commonwealth Games
- Nigeria at the 1998 Commonwealth Games
