= Wrestling at the 1996 Summer Olympics – Men's freestyle 90 kg =

Men's freestyle 90 kg at the Games of the XXVI Olympiad
- Venue: Georgia World Congress Center
- Dates: 1–2 August 1996
- Competitors: 21 from 21 nations

Medalists
1st place, gold medalist(s)		Rasoul Khadem	Iran
2nd place, silver medalist(s)		Makharbek Khadartsev	Russia
3rd place, bronze medalist(s)		Eldar Kurtanidze	Georgia

The men's freestyle 90 kilograms at the 1996 Summer Olympics as part of the wrestling program were held at the Georgia World Congress Center from August 1 to August 2. The gold and silver medalists were determined by the final match of the main single-elimination bracket. The losers advanced to the repechage. These matches determined the bronze medalist for the event.

== Results ==
=== Round 1 ===
	Score		CP
1/16 finals
Ričardas Pauliukonis (LTU)	11–0	Louis Purcell (ASA)	4–0 ST
Eldar Kurtanidze (GEO)	11–0	Kaloyan Baev (BUL)	4–0 ST
Kim Ik-hee (KOR)	2–1	Péter Bacsa (HUN)	3–1 PP
Jozef Lohyňa (SVK)	5–0	Tatsuo Kawai (JPN)	3–0 PO
Bayanmönkhiin Gantogtokh (MGL)	5–0	José Betancourt (PUR)	3–0 PO
Victor Kodei (NGR)	1–6	Rasoul Khadem (IRI)	1–3 PP
Scott Bianco (CAN)	2–5	Islam Bayramukov (KAZ)	1–3 PP
Robert Kostecki (POL)	4–5	Dzhambolat Tedeyev (UKR)	1–3 PP
Bob Renney (AUS)	1–11	Heiko Balz (GER)	1–4 SP
Bashir Bhola Bhala (PAK)	0–10	Makharbek Khadartsev (RUS)	0–4 ST
Melvin Douglas (USA)		Bye	

=== Round 2 ===
	Score		CP
1/8 finals
Melvin Douglas (USA)	5–0	Ričardas Pauliukonis (LTU)	3–0 PO
Eldar Kurtanidze (GEO)	2–3	Kim Ik-hee (KOR)	1–3 PP
Jozef Lohyňa (SVK)	5–3	Bayanmönkhiin Gantogtokh (MGL)	3–1 PP
Rasoul Khadem (IRI)	4–3	Islam Bayramukov (KAZ)	3–1 PP
Dzhambolat Tedeyev (UKR)	4–1	Heiko Balz (GER)	3–1 PP
Makharbek Khadartsev (RUS)		Bye	
Repechage
Louis Purcell (ASA)	0–4 Fall	Kaloyan Baev (BUL)	0–4 TO
Péter Bacsa (HUN)	5–2	Tatsuo Kawai (JPN)	3–1 PP
José Betancourt (PUR)	0–10	Victor Kodei (NGR)	0–4 ST
Scott Bianco (CAN)	3–2	Robert Kostecki (POL)	3–1 PP
Bob Renney (AUS)	3–7	Bashir Bhola Bhala (PAK)	1–3 PP

=== Round 3 ===
	Score		CP
Quarterfinals
Makharbek Khadartsev (RUS)	4–1	Melvin Douglas (USA)	3–1 PP
Kim Ik-hee (KOR)	0–3	Jozef Lohyňa (SVK)	0–3 PO
Rasoul Khadem (IRI)		Bye	
Dzhambolat Tedeyev (UKR)		Bye	
Repechage
Kaloyan Baev (BUL)	5–7	Péter Bacsa (HUN)	1–3 PP
Victor Kodei (NGR)	7–0	Scott Bianco (CAN)	3–0 PO
Bashir Bhola Bhala (PAK)	0–12	Ričardas Pauliukonis (LTU)	0–4 ST
Eldar Kurtanidze (GEO)	6–1	Bayanmönkhiin Gantogtokh (MGL)	3–1 PP
Islam Bayramukov (KAZ)	3–0	Heiko Balz (GER)	3–0 PO

=== Round 4 ===
	Score		CP
Semifinals
Makharbek Khadartsev (RUS)	7–1	Jozef Lohyňa (SVK)	3–1 PP
Rasoul Khadem (IRI)	3–0	Dzhambolat Tedeyev (UKR)	3–0 PO
Repechage
Péter Bacsa (HUN)	4–7	Victor Kodei (NGR)	1–3 PP
Ričardas Pauliukonis (LTU)	1–5	Eldar Kurtanidze (GEO)	1–3 PP
Islam Bayramukov (KAZ)	0–3	Melvin Douglas (USA)	0–3 PO
Kim Ik-hee (KOR)		Bye	

=== Round 5 ===
	Score		CP
Repechage
Kim Ik-hee (KOR)	0–7	Victor Kodei (NGR)	0–3 PO
Eldar Kurtanidze (GEO)	1–0	Melvin Douglas (USA)	3–0 PO

=== Round 6 ===
	Score		CP
Repechage
Jozef Lohyňa (SVK)	10–0	Victor Kodei (NGR)	4–0 ST
Eldar Kurtanidze (GEO)	10–4	Dzhambolat Tedeyev (UKR)	3–1 PP

=== Finals ===
	Score		CP
Classification 7th–8th
Kim Ik-hee (KOR)	0–6	Melvin Douglas (USA)	0–3 PO
Classification 5th–6th
Victor Kodei (NGR)	0–12 Fall	Dzhambolat Tedeyev (UKR)	0–4 TO
Bronze medal match
Jozef Lohyňa (SVK)	0–5	Eldar Kurtanidze (GEO)	0–3 PO
Gold medal match
Makharbek Khadartsev (RUS)	0–3	Rasoul Khadem (IRI)	0–3 PO

== Final standing ==
Rank	Athlete
1st place, gold medalist(s)	Rasoul Khadem (IRI)
2nd place, silver medalist(s)	Makharbek Khadartsev (RUS)
3rd place, bronze medalist(s)	Eldar Kurtanidze (GEO)
4	Jozef Lohyňa (SVK)
5	Dzhambolat Tedeyev (UKR)
6	Victor Kodei (NGR)
7	Melvin Douglas (USA)
8	Kim Ik-hee (KOR)
9	Ričardas Pauliukonis (LTU)
10	Péter Bacsa (HUN)
11	Islam Bayramukov (KAZ)
12	Heiko Balz (GER)
13	Kaloyan Baev (BUL)
14	Bayanmönkhiin Gantogtokh (MGL)
15	Scott Bianco (CAN)
16	Bashir Bhola Bhala (PAK)
17	Robert Kostecki (POL)
18	Bob Renney (AUS)
19	Tatsuo Kawai (JPN)
20	Louis Purcell (ASA)
20	José Betancourt (PUR)
