= Georgia at the 1996 Summer Olympics =

- Flag of Georgia
- IOC code: GEO
- NOC: Georgian National Olympic Committee
- Website: www.geonoc.org.ge (in Georgian and English)

in Atlanta
- Competitors: 34 (27 men, 7 women) in 13 sports
- Flag bearer: Georgi Kandelaki
- Medals Ranked 68th: Gold 0 Silver 0 Bronze 2 Total 2

Summer Olympics appearances (overview)
- 1996; 2000; 2004; 2008; 2012; 2016; 2020; 2024

Other related appearances
- Russian Empire (1900–1912); Soviet Union (1952–1988); Unified Team (1992)

Georgia (the country, not the U.S. state) competed in the Summer Olympic Games as an independent nation for the first time at the 1996 Summer Olympics in Atlanta, United States. Previously, Georgian athletes competed for the Unified Team at the 1992 Summer Olympics. 34 competitors, 27 men and 7 women, took part in 39 events in 13 sports.

== Medalists ==
Medal	Name	Sport	Event	Date
Bronze	Soso Liparteliani	Judo	Men's -78	23 July
Bronze	Eldar Kurtanidze	Wrestling	Men's freestyle 90 kg	2 Aug

== Archery ==
In its debut Olympic archery competition, Georgia sent only Unified Team-era veteran archer and quarterfinalist Khatouna Kurivichvili. In Atlanta, she was defeated in the first round.

Athlete	Event	Ranking round		Round of 64	Round of 32	Round of 16	Quarterfinals	Semifinals	Final / BM	
Athlete	Event	Score	Seed	Opposition Score	Opposition Score	Opposition Score	Opposition Score	Opposition Score	Opposition Score	Rank
Khatouna Kurivichvili	Women's individual	634	37	Klata (POL); L 148–152	Did not advance					49

== Athletics ==
Key

- Note–Ranks given for track events are within the athlete's heat only

Women's track

Athlete	Event	Heat		Quarterfinal		Semifinal		Final	
Athlete	Event	Result	Rank	Result	Rank	Result	Rank	Result	Rank
Maia Azarashvili	200m	23.63	6	"Did not advance					

Women's field

Athlete	Event	Qualification		Final	
Athlete	Event	Distance	Position	Distance	Position
Elvira Urusova	Shot put	17.69	17	Did not advance	

== Boxing ==
Athlete	Event	Round of 32	Round of 16	Quarterfinal	Semifinal	Final	
Athlete	Event	Opponent Result	Opponent Result	Opponent Result	Opponent Result	Opponent Result	Rank
Koba Gogoladze	Lightweight	Ri (PRK); W 17–9	González (CUB); W 14–9	Doroftei (ROU); L 8–17	Did not advance		
Besarion Vardzelashvili	Light welterweight	Bykovsky (BLR); L 11–11 TB	Did not advance				
Tengiz Meskhadze	Welterweight	Vargas (USA); L 4–10	Did not advance				
Akaki Kakauridze	Middleweight	Araneda (CHI); W 10–3	Bahari (ALG); L 5–8	Did not advance			
Georgi Kandelaki	Heavyweight	García (ECU); W 6–1	Bartnik (POL); W 6–1	Savón (CUB); L 4–20	Did not advance		

== Diving ==
Athlete	Event	Preliminary		Semifinal				Final			
Athlete	Event	Points	Rank	Points	Rank	Total	Rank	Points	Rank	Total	Rank
Gocha Gakharia	Men's 3 m springboard	256.68	34	Did not advance							
Nino Qazarashvili	Women's 3 m springboard	191.49	28	Did not advance							

== Fencing ==
One male fencer represented Georgia in 1996.

Athlete	Event	Round of 64	Round of 32	Round of 16	Quarterfinal	Semifinal	Final / BM	
Athlete	Event	Opposition Result	Opposition Result	Opposition Result	Opposition Result	Opposition Result	Opposition Result	Rank
Archil Lortkipanidze	Men's sabre	Banos (CAN); L 14–15	Did not advance					36

== Gymnastics ==
=== Artistic ===
Athlete	Event	Apparatus												Total	
Athlete	Event	F		PH		R		V		PB		HB		Total	
Athlete	Event	C	O	C	O	C	O	C	O	C	O	C	O	Score	Rank
Ilia Giorgadze	Qualification	9.512	9.550	9.487	9.325	9.325	9.200	9.075	9.400	9.150	9.300	8.475	9.400	111.199	41

=== Rhythmic ===
Athlete	Event	Preliminaries						Semifinal						Final					
Athlete	Event	Apparatus				Total		Apparatus				Total		Apparatus				Total	
Athlete	Event	Rope	Ball	Clubs	Ribbon	Score	Rank	Rope	Ball	Clubs	Ribbon	Score	Rank	Rope	Ball	Clubs	Ribbon	Score	Rank
Ekaterina Abramia	Individual All-around	9.200	9.250	9.183	9.200	36.833	25	Did not advance											

== Judo ==
Men

Athlete	Event	Round of 64	Round of 32	Round of 16	Quarterfinal	Semifinal	Repechage 1	Repechage 2	Repechage 3	Final / BM	
Athlete	Event	Opposition Result	Opposition Result	Opposition Result	Opposition Result	Opposition Result	Opposition Result	Opposition Result	Opposition Result	Opposition Result	Rank
Giorgi Vazagashvili	–60 kg	Bye	Giovinazzo (ITA); L	Did not advance			Chambilly (FRA); W	Acuña (MEX); W	Bagirov (BLR); L	Did not advance	
Giorgi Revazishvili	–65 kg	Morales (ARG); W	Laats (BEL); L	Did not advance			Fuentes (USA); W	Lewak (POL); W	Hernández (CUB); L	Did not advance	
Vladimeri Dgebuadze	–71 kg	Bye	Payne (BAR); W	Bentes (POR); W	Boldbaatar (MGL); L	Did not advance	Bye	Pedro (USA); L	Did not advance		
Soso Liparteliani	–78 kg	Bye	Morgan (CAN); W	Cho (KOR); L	Did not advance		Kretsul (MDA); W	Shmakov (UZB); W	Canto (BRA); W	Dott (GER); W	3rd place, bronze medalist(s)
Giorgi Tsmindashvili	–86 kg	Bye	Zanol (BRA); L	Did not advance							
Mevlud Lobzhanidze	–95 kg	Bye	Capo (USA); W	Nakamura (JPN); L	Did not advance						
David Khakhaleishvili	+95 kg	Lungu (ROU); L	Did not advance								

== Modern pentathlon ==
Athlete	Event	Riding (show jumping)			Fencing (épée one touch)			Shooting (10 m air pistol)			Swimming (200 m freestyle)			Running (3000 m cross-country)			Total	
Athlete	Event	Penalties	Rank	MP points	Results	Rank	MP points	Points	Rank	MP points	Time	Rank	MP points	Time	Rank	MP points	Points	Rank
Vakhtang Iagorashvili	Individual	210	27	890	20	=3	940	168	29	952	3:15.04	1	1312	13:31.914	22	1132	5226	20

== Sailing ==
Open

Fleet racing

Athlete	Event	Race											Total	
Athlete	Event	1	2	3	4	5	6	7	8	9	10	11	Points	Rank
Guram Biganishvili; Vladimer Gruzdevi	Star	13	10	22	14	~~23~~	~~24~~	21	9	5	18	112	16	

== Weightlifting ==
Men

Athlete	Event	Snatch			Clean & jerk			Total	Rank
Athlete	Event	1	2	3	1	2	3	Total	Rank
Bidzina Mikiashvili	-83kg	160.0	~~165.0~~	~~165.0~~	200.0	~~205.0~~	~~205.0~~	360.0	9
Mukhran Gogia	-108kg	Did not start							

== Wrestling ==
Freestyle

Athlete	Event	Round 1	Round 2	Round 3	Semifinal	Repechage 1	Repechage 2	Repechage 3	Repechage 4	Bronze semifinal	Final / BM / Pl.	
Athlete	Event	Opposition Score	Opposition Score	Opposition Score	Opposition Score	Opposition Score	Opposition Score	Opposition Score	Opposition Score	Opposition Score	Opposition Score	Rank
Avtandil Gogolishvili	–82 kg	Khadem (USA); L 0–3	Did not advance			Diouf (SEN); W 6–2	Penev (BUL); W 4–1	Ibragimov (AZE); L 4–6	Did not advance			11
Eldar Kurtanidze	–90 kg	Baev (BUL); W 11–0	Kim (KOR); L 2–3	Did not advance		Bye	Gantogtokh (MGL); W 6–1	Pauliukonis (LTU); W 5–1	Kurtanidze (USA); W 1–0	Tedeyev (UKR); W 10–4	Bronze medal match Lohyňa (SVK); W 5–0	3rd place, bronze medalist(s)
Zaza Tkeshelashvili	–100 kg	Khabelov (RUS); L 0–2	Did not advance			Sánchez (PUR); W 3–2	Sumiyaabazar (MGL); L 2–6	Did not advance				13
Zaza Turmanidze	+130 kg	Pikos (AUS); W 8–0	Medvedev (BLR); L 1–3	Did not advance		Bye	Baumgartner (USA); L 2–14	Did not advance				10

== Notes ==
- The Official Report of the Centennial Olympic Games, Volume III The Competition Results (PDF). Atlanta: Peachtree Publishers. 1997. ISBN 1-56145-150-9. Archived from the original (PDF) on 2007-09-27.
- Watkins, Ginger T. "Olympic Medal Winners". International Olympic Committee.
