= Boxing at the 1996 Summer Olympics – Bantamweight =

Boxing competitions

Bantamweight boxing at the Games of the XXVI Olympiad
- Venue: Alexander Memorial Coliseum
- Dates: 20 July – 3 August 1996
- Competitors: 31 from 31 nations

Medalists
1st place, gold medalist(s)		István Kovács	Hungary
2nd place, silver medalist(s)		Arnaldo Mesa	Cuba
3rd place, bronze medalist(s)		Vichairachanon Khadpo	Thailand
3rd place, bronze medalist(s)		Raimkul Malakhbekov	Russia

The Bantamweight class in the boxing at the 1996 Summer Olympics competition was the third-lightest class at the 1996 Summer Olympics in Atlanta, Georgia. The weight class is open for boxers up from 54 kilograms. The competition in the Alexander Memorial Coliseum started on 1996-07-20 and ended on 1996-08-03.

== Medalists ==
Gold	István Kovács; Hungary
Silver	Arnaldo Mesa; Cuba
Bronze	Vichairachanon Khadpo; Thailand
Bronze	Raimkul Malakhbekov; Russia

== Results ==
Round of 32
Abubakirov (KAZ)	4
Bouaita (FRA)	10
Raheem (USA)	19
Hoe (PRK)	4
Larbi (SWE)	5
Mesa (CUB)	19
Bae (KOR)	8
Virgilio Vicera (PHI)	4
Davaatseren (MGL)	13
Chongo (ZAM)	7
Malakhbekov (RUS)	16
Cotto (PUR)	6
Tsiripidis (GRE)	6
Boulehia (ALG)	10
Nolasco (DOM)	18
Naraina (MRI)	14
Nafil (MAR)	16
Vernal (COL)	3
Lambert (CAN)	2
Khadpo (THA)	12
Barreto (VEN)	9
Khristov (BUL)	3
Swan (AUS)	4
Riadh (TUN)	14
Olteanu (ROM)	RSC-3
Álvarez (MEX)	(03:37)
Aweda (NGR)	10
Khasanov (TJK)	20
Kovács (HUN)	15
Karagöz (TUR)	3

Round of 16
Križan (SVK)	6
Bouaita (FRA)	13
Raheem (USA)	(02:15)
Mesa (CUB)	RSC-1
Bae (KOR)	10
Davaatseren (MGL)	11
Malakhbekov (RUS)	RSC-3
Boulehia (ALG)	(02:52)
Nolasco (DOM)	6
Nafil (MAR)	18
Khadpo (THA)	14
Barreto (VEN)	6
Riadh (TUN)	3
Olteanu (ROM)	16
Khasanov (TJK)	3
Kovács (HUN)	17

Quarterfinals
Bouaita (FRA)	8
Mesa (CUB)	15
Davaatseren (MGL)	9
Malakhbekov (RUS)	21
Nafil (MAR)	4
Khadpo (THA)	13
Olteanu (ROM)	2
Kovács (HUN)	24

Semifinals
Mesa (CUB)	14
Malakhbekov (RUS)	14
Khadpo (THA)	7
Kovács (HUN)	12

Final
Mesa (CUB)	7
Kovács (HUN)	14
