= Hungary at the 1996 Summer Olympics =

- IOC code: HUN
- NOC: Hungarian Olympic Committee
- Website: www.olimpia.hu (in Hungarian and English)

in Atlanta
- Competitors: 212 (147 men and 65 women) in 24 sports
- Flag bearer: Bence Szabó (fencing)
- Medals Ranked 12th: Gold 7 Silver 4 Bronze 10 Total 21

Summer Olympics appearances (overview)
- 1896; 1900; 1904; 1908; 1912; 1920; 1924; 1928; 1932; 1936; 1948; 1952; 1956; 1960; 1964; 1968; 1972; 1976; 1980; 1984; 1988; 1992; 1996; 2000; 2004; 2008; 2012; 2016; 2020; 2024

Other related appearances
- 1906 Intercalated Games

Hungary competed at the 1996 Summer Olympics in Atlanta, United States. 212 competitors, 147 men and 65 women, took part in 145 events in 24 sports.

== Medalists ==
=== Gold ===
- Balázs Kiss — Athletics, Men's Hammer Throw
- István Kovács — Boxing, Men's Bantamweight
- Csaba Horváth and György Kolonics — Canoeing, Men's C2 500 m Canadian Pairs
- Rita Kőbán — Canoeing, Women's K1 500 m Kayak Singles
- Norbert Rózsa — Swimming, Men's 200 m Breaststroke
- Attila Czene — Swimming, Men's 200 m Individual Medley
- Krisztina Egerszegi — Swimming, Women's 200 m Backstroke

=== Silver ===
- Attila Adrovicz, Ferenc Csipes, Gábor Horváth and András Rajna — Canoeing, Men's K4 1000 m Kayak Fours
- Csaba Köves, József Navarrete and Bence Szabó — Fencing, Men's Sabre Team
- Szilveszter Csollány — Gymnastics, Men's Rings
- Károly Güttler — Swimming, Men's 200 m Breaststroke

=== Bronze ===
- Imre Pulai — Canoeing, Men's C1 500 m Canadian Singles
- György Zala — Canoeing, Men's C1 1000 m Canadian Singles
- Csaba Horváth and György Kolonics — Canoeing, Men's C2 1000 m Canadian Singles
- Géza Imre — Fencing, Men's Épée Individual
- Gyöngyi Szalay — Fencing, Women's Épée Individual
- Éva Erdős, Andrea Farkas, Beáta Hoffmann, Anikó Kántor, Erzsébet Kocsis, Beatrix Kökény, Eszter Mátéfi, Auguszta Mátyás, Anikó Meksz, Anikó Nagy, Helga Németh, Ildikó Pádár, Beáta Siti, Anna Szántó, Katalin Szilágyi, and Beatrix Tóth — Handball, Women's Team Competition
- János Martinek — Modern Pentathlon, Men's Individual Competition
- Ágnes Kovács — Swimming, Women's 200 m Breaststroke
- Krisztina Egerszegi — Swimming, Women's 400 m Individual Medley
- Attila Feri — Weightlifting, Men's Lightweight (70 kg)

== Archery ==
Hungary's two veterans in Atlanta were both defeated in the first round.

Women's Individual Competition:

- Judit Kovács → Round of 64, 45th place (0–1)
- Timea Kiss → Round of 64, 51st place (0–1)

== Athletics ==
Men's 400 m Hurdles

- Dusan Kovács

- Heat — 49.23 s
- Semi Final — 48.57 s (→ did not advance)

Men's Long Jump

- János Uzsoki

- Qualification — 7.82m (→ did not advance, 22nd place)

Men's Triple Jump

- Tibor Ordina

- Qualification — 16.04m (→ did not advance, 33rd place)

Men's Discus Throw

- Attila Horváth

- Qualification — 62.90 m
- Final — 62.28 m (→ 10th place)

Men's Hammer Throw

- Balázs Kiss

- Qualification — 78.34m
- Final — 81.24m (→ Gold Medal)

- Zsolt Németh

- Qualification — 73.68m (→ did not advance)

- Adrián Annus

- Qualification — 72.58m (→ did not advance)

Men's Decathlon

- Zsolt Kürtösi

- Final Result — 7755 points (→ 27th place)

Women's Heptathlon

- Rita Ináncsi

- Final Result — 6336 points (→ 6th place)

Women's Long Jump

- Tünde Vaszi

- Qualification — 6.73m
- Final — 6.60m (→ 9th place)

- Rita Ináncsi

- Qualification — 6.02m (→ did not advance)

Women's Triple Jump

- Zita Balint

- Qualification — NM (→ no ranking)

Women's Marathon

- Judit Nagy — 2:38.43 (→ 36th place)

Women's 10 km Walk

- Mária Urbanik – 43:32 (→ 9th place)
- Anikó Szebenszky – 45:57 (→ 27th place)

== Boxing ==
Men's Bantamweight (– 54 kg)

- István Kovács → Gold Medal

- First Round — Defeated Soner Karaoz (Turkey), 15-3
- Second Round — Defeated Khurshed Khasanov (Tajikistan), 17-3
- Quarter Finals — Defeated George Olteanu (Romania), 24-2
- Semi Finals — Defeated Vichairachanon Khadpo (Thailand), 12-7
- Final — Defeated Arnaldo Mesa (Cuba), 14-7

Men's Featherweight (– 57 kg)

- János Nagy

- First Round — Defeated John Kelman (Barbados), referee stopped contest in third round
- Second Round — Defeated Daniel Attah (Nigeria), 14-12
- Quarter Finals — Lost to Pablo Chacón (Argentina), 7–18

Men's Welterweight (– 67 kg)

- József Nagy

- First Round — Lost to Juan Hernández Sierra (Cuba), referee stopped contest in second round

Men's Light Middleweight (– 71 kg)

- György Mizsei

- First Round — Defeated Richard Rowles (Australia), 10-2
- Second Round — Lost to Markus Beyer (Germany), 6–14

Men's Middleweight (– 75 kg)

- Zsolt Erdei

- First Round — Defeated Juan Pablo López (Mexico), referee stopped contest in third round
- Second Round — Lost to Malik Beyleroğlu (Turkey), 8–9

== Diving ==
Men's 3m Springboard

- Imre Lengyel

- Preliminary Heat — 346.74
- Semi Final — 204.51 (→ did not advance, 17th place)

Women's 3m Springboard

- Orsolya Pintér

- Preliminary Heat — 206.52 (→ did not advance, 25th place)

== Fencing ==
Fifteen fencers, nine men and six women, represented Hungary in 1996.

Men's foil

- Zsolt Érsek
- Márk Marsi
- Róbert Kiss

Men's team foil

- Márk Marsi, Róbert Kiss, Zsolt Érsek

Men's épée

- Géza Imre
- Iván Kovács
- Krisztián Kulcsár

Men's team épée

- Géza Imre, Iván Kovács, Krisztián Kulcsár

Men's sabre

- József Navarrete
- Bence Szabó
- Csaba Köves

Men's team sabre

- Bence Szabó, Csaba Köves, József Navarrete

Women's foil

- Aida Mohamed
- Zsuzsa Némethné Jánosi
- Gabriella Lantos

Women's team foil

- Aida Mohamed, Gabriella Lantos, Zsuzsa Némethné Jánosi

Women's épée

- Gyöngyi Szalay-Horváth
- Tímea Nagy
- Adrienn Hormay

Women's team épée

- Adrienn Hormay, Gyöngyi Szalay-Horváth, Tímea Nagy

== Modern pentathlon ==
Men's Individual Competition:

- János Martinek — 5501 pts (→ Bronze Medal)
- Ákos Hanzély — 5435 pts (→ 6th place)
- Péter Sárfalvi — 5196 pts (→ 21st place)

== Sailing ==
Men's Laser sailing

- Tamás Eszes

== Swimming ==
Men's 100 m Freestyle

- Attila Zubor

- Heat — 50.43 (→ did not advance, 20th place)

- Béla Szabados

- Heat — 51.26 (→ did not advance, 35th place)

Men's 200 m Freestyle

- Attila Czene

- Heat — 1:51.59 (→ did not advance, 20th place)

- Miklós Kollár

- Heat — 1:52.19 (→ did not advance, 25th place)

Men's 400 m Freestyle

- Béla Szabados

- Heat — 3:59.36 (→ did not advance, 23rd place)

Men's 100 m Backstroke

- Tamás Deutsch

- Heat — 56.96 (→ did not advance, 25th place)

Men's 200 m Backstroke

- Olivér Ágh

- Heat — 2:01.84
- B-Final — 2:02.17 (→ 12th place)

Men's 100 m Breaststroke

- Károly Güttler

- Heat — 1:01.80
- Final — 1:01.49 (→ 4th place)

- Norbert Rózsa

- Heat — 1:02.72
- B-Final — scratched

Men's 200 m Breaststroke

- Norbert Rózsa

- Heat — 2:14.66
- Final — 2:12.57 (→ Gold Medal)

- Károly Güttler

- Heat — 2:13.89
- Final — 2:13.03 (→ Silver Medal)

Men's 100 m Butterfly

- Péter Horváth

- Heat — 53.69
- B-Final — 53.48 (→ 11th place)

Men's 200 m Butterfly

- Péter Horváth

- Heat — 1:58.76
- Final — 1:59.12 (→ 8th place)

- Attila Czene

- Heat — 2:00.50
- B-Final — 1:58.99 (→ 9th place)

Men's 200 m Individual Medley

- Attila Czene

- Heat — 2:02.10
- Final — 1:59.91 (→ Gold Medal)

- Attila Zubor

- Heat — 2:06.24 (→ did not advance, 22nd place)

Men's 400 m Individual Medley

- István Batházi

- Heat — 4:27.37
- B-Final — DSQ

- Gergő Kis

- Heat — 4:28.05 (→ did not advance, 19th place)

Men's 4 × 100 m Medley Relay

- Tamás Deutsch, Károly Güttler, Péter Horváth, and Attila Zubor

- Heat — 3:41.05

- Tamás Deutsch, Károly Güttler, Péter Horváth, and Attila Czene

- Final — 3:40.84 (→ 6th place)

Women's 100 m Freestyle

- Anna Nyíry

- Heat — 57.82 (→ did not advance, 30th place)

Women's 800 m Freestyle

- Rita Kovács

- Heat — 9:06.97 (→ did not advance, 25th place)

Women's 200 m Backstroke

- Krisztina Egerszegi

- Heat — 2:09.18
- Final — 2:07.83 (→ Gold Medal)

Women's 100 m Breaststroke

- Ágnes Kovács

- Heat — 1:09.05
- Final — 1:09.55 (→ 7th place)

Women's 200 m Breaststroke

- Ágnes Kovács

- Heat — 2:29.58
- Final — 2:26.57 (→ Bronze Medal)

Women's 100 m Butterfly

- Edit Klocker

- Heat — 1:03.61 (→ did not advance, 30th place)

Women's 200 m Butterfly

- Edit Klocker

- Heat — 2:17.90 (→ did not advance, 24th place)

Women's 400 m Individual Medley

- Krisztina Egerszegi

- Heat — 4:43.09
- Final — 4:42.53 (→ Bronze Medal)

Women's 4 × 100 m Medley Relay

- Krisztina Egerszegi, Ágnes Kovács, Edit Klocker, and Anna Nyíry

- Heat — 4:10.92 (→ did not advance, 11th place)

== Tennis ==
Men's Singles Competition

- Sándor Noszály

- First round — Lost to Oleg Ogorodov (Uzbekistan) 5–7, 6–7
- Alternates
- Gergely Kisgyorgy
- Daniel Somogyi

Women's Singles Competition

- Virág Csurgó

- First round — Defeated Aleksandra Olsza (Poland) 6-2 7-5
- Second round — Lost to Kimiko Date (Japan) 2–6 3–6

- Andrea Temesvári

- First round — Lost to Judith Wiesner (Austria) 6–7 4–6

== Water polo ==
=== Men's team competition ===
- Preliminary round (group A)

- Defeated Russia (8–7)
- Defeated Germany (9–8)
- Defeated Netherlands (10–8)
- Defeated Spain (8–7)
- Defeated Yugoslavia (12–8)

- Quarterfinals

- Defeated Greece (12–8)

- Semifinals

- Lost to Spain (6–7)

- Bronze Medal Match

- Lost to Italy (18–20) → Fourth place

- Team roster

- Tibor Benedek
- Rajmund Fodor
- Tamás Kásás
- Zoltan Kosz
- András Gyöngyösi
- Péter Kuna
- László Tóth
- Balázs Vincze
- Frank Tóth
- Zsolt Varga
- Tamás Dala
- Attila Monostori
- Zsolt Németh

- Head coach: György Horkai

== Weightlifting ==
Men

Athlete	Event	Snatch			Clean & Jerk			Total	Rank
Athlete	Event	1	2	3	1	2	3	Total	Rank
Tibor Karczag	– 54 kg	~~107.5~~	~~107.5~~	~~107.5~~	—	—	—	DNF	—
Zoltán Farkas	– 59 kg	130.0	~~132.5~~	~~132.5~~	140.0	145.0	150.0	280.0	8
Adrián Popa	– 64 kg	130.0	135.0	~~137.5~~	167.5	~~172.5~~	172.5	307.5	5
Zoltán Kecskés	– 64 kg	130.0	135.0	~~137.5~~	162.5	167.5	~~170.0~~	302.5	8
Attila Feri	– 70 kg	~~152.5~~	152.5	~~155.0~~	~~187.5~~	187.5	~~192.5~~	340.0	3rd place, bronze medalist(s)
Gábor Molnár	– 70 kg	~~145.0~~	~~145.0~~	~~145.0~~	—	—	—	DNF	—
Tibor Stark	+ 108 kg	180.0	185.0	187.5	220.0	227.5	~~230.0~~	415.0	8
