= Maria Gonzalez =

Maria Gonzalez may refer to:

== Politics ==
- María del Pilar Ayuso González (born 1942), Spanish politician
- María del Carmen Concepción González, Cuban politician
- María Teresa González, Puerto Rican politician
- María Dolores González Katarain (1954-1986), leader of Basque separatist group ETA
- María Merced González González, Mexican politician
- María González Alvarado (born 1966), Mexican politician
- María González Veracruz (born 1979), Spanish politician
- María González (Colorado politician)

== Sports ==
- Maria Gonzalez, who participated in the judo competition for Cuba at the 2008 Summer Paralympics
- María González (javelin thrower) (born 1982), Venezuelan javelin thrower
- Maria Fernanda González Ramirez (born 1990), Mexican Olympic swimmer who swam at the 2008 and 2012 Olympics
- María Cruz González (born 1971), field hockey player
- María Herazo González (born 1997), Colombian tennis player
- Mariví González (born 1961), field hockey player
- María Guadalupe González (born 1989), Mexican racewalker
- Maria Isabel Gonzalez (born 1984), Guatemalan gymnast
- María González (softball)
- Maria Gonzalez (Andorran gymnast)

== Others ==
- María de los Ángeles Alvariño González (1916–2005), Spanish oceanographer
- Delfina and María de Jesús González, Mexican sisters
- Maria Teresa Maia Gonzalez (born 1958), Portuguese writer
- María Elena González (born 1957), Cuban-American artist
- María José González, Miss Venezuela 2009
- María Felicidad González (1884–1980), Paraguayan academic and feminist activist
- María Teresa González, Venezuelan artist
- Maria Gonzalez Roesch, Costa Rican actress

== See also ==
- María Dolores Gonzáles (disambiguation)
