= Judo at the 1996 Summer Olympics – Men's 78 kg =

Judo competition

Men's 78 kg at the Games of the XXVI Olympiad
- Venue: Georgia World Congress Center
- Date: 23 July 1996
- Competitors: 34 from 34 nations

Medalists
1st place, gold medalist(s)		Djamel Bouras	France
2nd place, silver medalist(s)		Toshihiko Koga	Japan
3rd place, bronze medalist(s)		Cho In-chul	South Korea
3rd place, bronze medalist(s)		Soso Liparteliani	Georgia

These are the results of the men's 78 kg (also known as half-middleweight) competition in judo at the 1996 Summer Olympics in Atlanta, Georgia. A total of 34 men competed in this event, limited to jūdōka whose body weight was less than, or equal to, 78 kilograms. Competition took place in the Georgia World Congress Center.

== Tournament results ==
=== First round ===
As there were more than 32 qualifiers for the tournament, three first round matches were held to reduce the field to 32 judoka.

- Shay-Oren Smadja (ISR) defeated Graeme Randall (GBR)
- Vladimir Shmakov (UZB) defeated Patrick Reiter (AUT)

=== Main bracket ===
The gold and silver medalists were determined by the final match of the main single-elimination bracket.

1st Round
Bouras (FRA)	W
Savchishkin (RUS)	L
Yuan (CHN)	W
Gevorgyan (ARM)	L
Figueroa (PUR)	L
Klas (NED)	W
Belgaid (MAR)	L
García (ARG)	W
Morris (USA)	W
Balayan (UKR)	L
Smadja (ISR)	L
Uznadze (TUR)	W
Dott (GER)	W
Dixon (NCA)	L
Laats (BEL)	W
Radulović (SCG)	L
Cho (KOR)	W
Cretu (MDA)	L
Morgan (CAN)	L
Liparteliani (GEO)	W
Shmakov (UZB)	W
Ciupe (ROU)	L
Cherifi (ALG)	W
Musa (NGR)	L
Volmar (HAI)	L
Canto (BRA)	W
Seilkhanov (KAZ)	L
Vatrican (MON)	W
Wolkowicz (POL)	W
Szabó (AUS)	L
Koga (JPN)	W
Lo (TPE)	L

2nd Round
Bouras (FRA)	W
Yuan (CHN)	L
Klas (NED)	L
García (ARG)	W
Morris (USA)	L
Uznadze (TUR)	W
Dott (GER)	W
Laats (BEL)	L
Cho (KOR)	W
Liparteliani (GEO)	L
Shmakov (UZB)	W
Cherifi (ALG)	L
Canto (BRA)	W
Vatrican (MON)	L
Wolkowicz (POL)	L
Koga (JPN)	W

Quarterfinals
Bouras (FRA)	W
García (ARG)	L
Uznadze (TUR)	L
Dott (GER)	W
Cho (KOR)	W
Shmakov (UZB)	L
Canto (BRA)	L
Koga (JPN)	W

Semifinals
Bouras (FRA)	W
Dott (GER)	L
Cho (KOR)	L
Koga (JPN)	W

Gold medal final
Bouras (FRA)	W
Koga (JPN)	L

=== Repechage ===
The losing semifinalists as well as those judoka eliminated in earlier rounds by the four semifinalists of the main bracket advanced to the repechage. These matches determined the two bronze medalists for the event.

First round
Savchishkin (RUS)	W
Yuan (CHN)	L
Dixon (NCA)	L
Laats (BEL)	W
Kretsul (MDA)	L
Liparteliani (GEO)	W
Lo (TPE)	W
Wolkowicz (POL)	L

Second round
García (ARG)	W
Savchishkin (RUS)	L
Uznadze (TUR)	W
Laats (BEL)	L
Shmakov (UZB)	L
Liparteliani (GEO)	W
Canto (BRA)	W
Lo (TPE)	L

Third round
García (ARG)	W
Uznadze (TUR)	L
Liparteliani (GEO)	W
Canto (BRA)	L

Bronze medal finals
Cho (KOR)	W
García (ARG)	L
Dott (GER)	L
Liparteliani (GEO)	W
