= Boxing at the 1998 Asian Games – Men's 54 kg =

Boxing competitions

Men's 54 kg at the 1998 Asian Games
- Venue: Land Sports Complex
- Date: 7–17 December 1998
- Competitors: 21 from 21 nations

Medalists
gold medal	Dingko Singh	India
silver medal	Timur Tulyakov	Uzbekistan
bronze medal	Sontaya Wongprates	Thailand
bronze medal	Marat Mazimbayev	Kazakhstan

The men's bantamweight boxing competition at the 1998 Asian Games in Bangkok, Thailand was held from 7 to 17 December at the Land Sports Complex.

Like all Asian Games boxing events, the competition was a straight single-elimination tournament. This event consisted of 21 boxers. The competition began with the round 32 on 7 December, where the number of competitors was reduced to 16, and concluded with the final on 17 December. As there were fewer than 32 boxers in the competition, a number of boxers received a bye through the preliminary round. Both semi-final losers were awarded bronze medals.

All bouts consisted of five three-minute rounds. The boxers receive points for every successful punch they land on their opponent's head or upper body. The boxer with the most points at the end of the bouts wins. If a boxer is knocked to the ground and cannot get up before the referee counts to 10 then the bout is over and the opponent wins.

== Schedule ==
All times are Indochina Time (UTC+07:00)

Date	Time	Event
Monday, 7 December 1998	14:00	Round of 32
Wednesday, 9 December 1998	14:00	Round of 16
Saturday, 12 December 1998	14:00	Quarterfinals
Monday, 14 December 1998	14:00	Semifinals
Thursday, 17 December 1998	14:00	Final

== Results ==
Legend

- RET — Won by retirement
- RSCI — Won by referee stop contest injury
- RSCO — Won by referee stop contest outclassed

=== Final ===
Final
Dingko Singh (IND)	RET
Timur Tulyakov (UZB)

=== Top half ===
Round of 32

Round of 16
Svay Vireak (CAM)	11
Sio Chi Hong (MAC)	5
Dingko Singh (IND)	12
Wei Hongtao (CHN)	6
Sontaya Wongprates (THA)	20
Omrin Sihombing (INA)	10
Adnan Yusoh (MAS)	RSCO
Ihab Tafesh (PLE)

Quarterfinals
Svay Vireak (CAM)
Dingko Singh (IND)	RSCO
Sontaya Wongprates (THA)	19
Adnan Yusoh (MAS)	6

Semifinals
Dingko Singh (IND)	18
Sontaya Wongprates (THA)	14

=== Bottom half ===
Round of 32
Rico Moreno (PHI)	7
Tu Chung-hsien (TPE)	1
Timur Tulyakov (UZB)	+5
Bae Ki-woong (KOR)	5
Akbar Ahadi (IRI)	15
Yasser Sheikhan (SYR)	6
Kazumasa Tsujimoto (JPN)	24
Shahid Jan (PAK)	6
Ri Gwang-sik (PRK)	RSCI
Phouthone Soulavanh (LAO)

Round of 16
Marat Mazimbayev (KAZ)	RSCO
Asadur Rahman (BAN)
Tseyen-Oidovyn Davaatseren (MGL)	12
Rico Moreno (PHI)	4
Timur Tulyakov (UZB)	12
Akbar Ahadi (IRI)	4
Kazumasa Tsujimoto (JPN)	18
Ri Gwang-sik (PRK)	22

Quarterfinals
Marat Mazimbayev (KAZ)	8
Tseyen-Oidovyn Davaatseren (MGL)	5
Timur Tulyakov (UZB)	12
Ri Gwang-sik (PRK)	7

Semifinals
Marat Mazimbayev (KAZ)	4
Timur Tulyakov (UZB)	18
