= Balayan (surname) =

Balayan (Armenian: Բալայան) is an Armenian surname. Notable people with this surname include:

- Arsen Balayan (born 1972), Russian-Uzbekistani football player and manager
- Karen Balayan (born 1975), Armenian-Ukrainian judoka
- Roman Balayan (born 1941), Ukrainian-Armenian film director
- Tigran Balayan (born 1977), Armenian diplomat and historian
- Zori Balayan (1935–2026), Armenian writer
