= Cherifi (surname) =

Cherifi is a surname of North African origin. Notable people with the surname include:

- Sidi Amar Cherif (fl. 18th century), founder of Zawiyet Sidi Amar Cherif, zawiya school
- Hacine Cherifi (born 1967), French boxer
- Lyes Cherifi (born 1968), Algerian judoka
- Redouane Cherifi (born 1993), Algerian association football player
