= Dayo Oyewusi =

Nigerian badminton player (born c.1966)

Personal information
- Born: c. 1966

Sport
- Country: Nigeria
- Sport: Badminton
- Handedness: Right
- Event: Women's singles & doubles

Women's singles & doubles
- BWF profile
Medal record
Women's badminton
Representing Nigeria
African Championships
Gold medal – first place	1988 Lagos	Women's doubles
Gold medal – first place	1988 Lagos	Women's team
Silver medal – second place	1988 Lagos	Women's singles
Bronze medal – third place	1994 Port Elizabeth	Women's singles
Bronze medal – third place	1994 Port Elizabeth	Mixed team

Dayo Oyewusi (born c. 1966) is a Nigerian badminton player. She competed in 1994 Commonwealth Games in Victoria, Canada. She is a former African champion with her partner Oby Edoga in 1988 African Badminton Championships.

== Achievements ==
=== IBF International ===
Women's singles
Year	Tournament	Opponent	Score	Result
1991	Kenya International	(Mauritius) Martine de Souza	3–11, 4–11	(silver) Runner-up

Women's doubles
Year	Tournament	Partner	Opponent	Score	Result
1991	Mauritius International	(Nigeria) Obiageli Olorunsola	(Mauritius) Martine de Souza (Mauritius) Vandanah Seesurun	15–12, 8–15, 3–15	(silver) Runner-up
1991	Kenya International	(Nigeria) Obiageli Olorunsola	(Mauritius) Martine de Souza (Mauritius) Vandanah Seesurun	15–10, 9–15, 18–17	(gold) Winner

Mixed doubles
Year	Tournament	Partner	Opponent	Score	Result
1991	Mauritius International	(Nigeria) Agarawu Tunde	(Nigeria) Tamuno Gibson (Nigeria) Obiageli Olorunsola	6–15, 5–15	(silver) Runner-up
1985	Mozambique International	(Nigeria) Clement Ogbo	(Soviet Union) Anatoli Skripko (Soviet Union) Svetlana Belyasova		(silver) Runner-up
