= Vichairachanon Khadpo =

Thai boxer

Vichairachanon Khadpo TCh, TM, RNgBh
Personal information
- Full name: วิชัย ขัดโพธิ์ วิชัย ราชานนท์
- Nickname: "Vichai"
- Nationality: Thailand
- Born: March 3, 1968 (age 58) Nong Ruea District, Khon Kaen Province
- Height: 1.63 m (5 ft 4 in)
- Weight: 51 kg (112 lb)

Sport
- Sport: Boxing
- Weight class: Bantamweight
- Club: Chankasem Teachers College; Royal Thai Air Force
Medal record
Olympic Games
| Bronze medal – third place | 1996 Atlanta | Bantamweight |
Asian Games
| Bronze medal – third place | 1990 Beijing | Flyweight |
| Bronze medal – third place | 1994 Hiroshima | Flyweight |
SEA Games
| Gold medal – first place | 1991 SEA Games | Flyweight |
| Gold medal – first place | 1995 SEA Games | Bantamweight |

Vichairachanon Khadpo (Thai: วิชัย ราชานนท์; born March 3, 1968) is a Thai boxer. At the 1996 Summer Olympics he won a bronze medal in the men's bantamweight division, together with Raimkul Malakhbekov of Russia.

In Muay thai, his name was Chingchai lookphraatit (ชิงชัย ลูกพระอาทิตย์)

== 1988 Olympic results ==
Below is the record of Vichairachanon Khadpo, a Thai flyweight boxer who competed at the 1988 Seoul Olympics:

- Round of 64: lost to Andy Agosto (Puerto Rico) by decision, 0–5

== 1996 Olympic results ==
Below is the record of Vichairachanon Khadpo, a Thai bantamweight boxer who competed at the 1996 Atlanta Olympics:

- Round of 32: Defeated Claude Lambert (Canada) 12–2
- Round of 16: Defeated Carlos Barreto (Venezuela) 14–6
- Quarterfinal: Defeated Hicham Nafil (Morocco) 13–4
- Semifinal: Lost to István Kovács (Hungary) 7-12 (was awarded bronze medal)
