= 1996 African Badminton Championships =

Tournament details
- Dates: 17–24 March
- Edition: 8th
- Venue: National Stadium
- Location: Lagos, Nigeria

The 1996 African Badminton Championships were the continental badminton championships to crown the best players and teams across Africa. The tournament was held in Lagos, Nigeria, from 17 to 24 March 1996. Only Nigeria and Uganda competed in the championships.

== Medalists ==
| Event | Gold | Silver | Bronze |
|---|---|---|---|
| Men's singles | (Nigeria) Agarawu Tunde | (Nigeria) Kayode Akinsanya | (Nigeria) Wasiu Ogunseye |
| Men's singles | (Nigeria) Agarawu Tunde | (Nigeria) Kayode Akinsanya | (Nigeria) Danjuma Fatauchi |
| Women's singles | (Nigeria) Obiageli Olorunsola | (Nigeria) Olamide Toyin Adebayo | (Nigeria) J. Abioye |
| Women's singles | (Nigeria) Obiageli Olorunsola | (Nigeria) Olamide Toyin Adebayo | (Nigeria) Bridget Ibenero |
| Men's doubles | (Nigeria) Danjuma Fatauchi (Nigeria) Agarawu Tunde | (Nigeria) Kayode Akinsanya (Nigeria) Wasiu Ogunseye | (Nigeria) D. Akuh (Nigeria) Wasiu Ogunseye |
| Men's doubles | (Nigeria) Danjuma Fatauchi (Nigeria) Agarawu Tunde | (Nigeria) Kayode Akinsanya (Nigeria) Wasiu Ogunseye | (Nigeria) Benjamin Orakpo (Nigeria) Adewole Sanyaolu |
| Women's doubles | (Nigeria) Olamide Toyin Adebayo (Nigeria) Obiageli Olorunsola | (Nigeria) J. Abioye (Nigeria) C. Emeribe | (Uganda) Helen Luziika (Uganda) Annet Nakamya |
| Women's doubles | (Nigeria) Olamide Toyin Adebayo (Nigeria) Obiageli Olorunsola | (Nigeria) J. Abioye (Nigeria) C. Emeribe | (Nigeria) Bridget Ibenero (Nigeria) Kuburat Mumini |
| Mixed doubles | (Nigeria) Kayode Akinsanya (Nigeria) Obiageli Olorunsola | (Nigeria) Olamide Toyin Adebayo (Nigeria) Wasiu Ogunseye | (Nigeria) Danjuma Fatauchi (Nigeria) Bridget Ibenero |
| Mixed doubles | (Nigeria) Kayode Akinsanya (Nigeria) Obiageli Olorunsola | (Nigeria) Olamide Toyin Adebayo (Nigeria) Wasiu Ogunseye | (Nigeria) J. Abioye (Nigeria) Adewole Sanyaolu |

=== Medal table ===
* Host nation (Nigeria)

| Rank | Nation | Gold | Silver | Bronze | Total |
|---|---|---|---|---|---|
| 1 | Nigeria* | 5 | 5 | 9 | 19 |
| 2 | Uganda | 0 | 0 | 1 | 1 |
| Totals (2 entries) | | 5 | 5 | 10 | 20 |
