= Oby Edoga-Solaja =

Nigerian badminton player and administrator (born 1962)

Personal information
- Born: 11 May 1962 (age 64) Aguleri, Nigeria

Sport
- Country: Nigeria
- Sport: Badminton
- Event: Women's singles & doubles

Women's singles & doubles
- BWF profile
Medal record
Women's badminton
Representing Nigeria
African Championships
Gold medal – first place	1988 Lagos	Women's singles
Gold medal – first place	1996 Lagos	Women's singles
Gold medal – first place	1988 Lagos	Women's doubles
Gold medal – first place	1996 Lagos	Women's doubles
Gold medal – first place	1988 Lagos	Mixed doubles
Gold medal – first place	1996 Lagos	Mixed doubles
Bronze medal – third place	1994 Port Elizabeth	Women's doubles
Africa Mixed Team Championships
Gold medal – first place	1980 Beira	Mixed team
Bronze medal – third place	1994 Port Elizabeth	Mixed team
Africa Women's Team Championships
Gold medal – first place	1982 Lagos	Women's team
Gold medal – first place	1988 Lagos	Women's team
Silver medal – second place	1980 Beira	Women's team

Obiageli Solaja (née Edoga; born 11 May 1962), also known as Obiageli Olorunsola, is a Nigerian badminton player.

== Career ==
Solaja studied at Queen's school in Enugu. She was coached by Unyanwa, a retired player when she was still an emerging prospect. She represented the Anambra state of Nigeria in multiple sports festivals held in 1977, 1979 and 1981.

She is a multiple times African champion and ten-times national champion between 1986 and 1996. She and Kayode Akinsanya became the first ever Nigerian badminton players to play at the Olympic Games in 1996, with whom she played in the mixed doubles discipline. She also played in the women's singles discipline. She won 2019 African women in badminton award. After her retirement, she worked as a coach and later as an administrator. She also is a board member of Badminton Federation of Nigeria.

== Achievements ==
=== African Championships ===
Women's singles

Year	Venue	Opponent	Score	Result
1988	National Stadium, Lagos, Nigeria	(Nigeria) Dayo Oyewusi		Gold
1996	National Stadium, Lagos, Nigeria	(Nigeria) Olamide Toyin Adebayo		Gold

Women's doubles

Year	Venue	Partner	Opponent	Score	Result
1988	National Stadium, Lagos, Nigeria	(Nigeria) Dayo Oyewusi	(Nigeria) C. Olua (Nigeria) Y. Oni		Gold
1994	University of Port Elizabeth, Port Elizabeth, South Africa	(Nigeria) Bisi Tiamiyu			Bronze
1996	National Stadium, Lagos, Nigeria	(Nigeria) Olamide Toyin Adebayo	(Nigeria) J. Abioye (Nigeria) C. Emeribe		Gold

Mixed doubles

Year	Venue	Partner	Opponent	Score	Result
1988	National Stadium, Lagos, Nigeria	(Nigeria) Tamuno Gibson	(Mauritius) Jacques Foo Kune (Mauritius) Cathy Foo Kune		Gold
1996	National Stadium, Lagos, Nigeria	(Nigeria) Kayode Akinsanya	(Nigeria) Olamide Toyin Adebayo (Nigeria) Wasiu Ogunseye		Gold

=== IBF International ===
Women's singles

Year	Tournament	Opponent	Score	Result
1991	Mauritius International	(Mauritius) Martine de Souza		(silver) Runner-up
1995	Nigeria International	(Nigeria) Olamide Toyin Adebayo		(gold) Winner

Women's doubles

Year	Tournament	Partner	Opponent	Score	Result
1983	Nigeria International	(Nigeria) I. Owolabi	(Nigeria) Bukola Bakreen (Nigeria) Grace Edwards	6–15, 7–15	(silver) Runner-up
1991	Mauritius International	(Nigeria) Dayo Oyewusi	(Mauritius) Martine de Souza (Mauritius) Vandanah Seesurun	15–12, 8–15, 3–15	(silver) Runner-up
1991	Kenya International	(Nigeria) Dayo Oyewusi	(Mauritius) Martine de Souza (Mauritius) Vandanah Seesurun	15–10, 9–15, 18–17	(gold) Winner
1995	Nigeria International	(Nigeria) Olamide Toyin Adebayo	(Nigeria) J. Abioye (Nigeria) Kuburat Mumini		(gold) Winner

Mixed doubles

Year	Tournament	Partner	Opponent	Score	Result
1991	Mauritius International	(Nigeria) Tamuno Gibson	(Nigeria) Agarawu Tunde (Nigeria) Dayo Oyewusi	15–6, 15–5	(gold) Winner
1991	Kenya International	(Nigeria) Sesan Gbajobi	(Kenya) Vijai Maini (Kenya) Naila Valani		(gold) Winner
1995	Nigeria International	(Nigeria) Kayode Akinsanya	(Nigeria) Danjuma Fatauchi (Nigeria) Olamide Toyin Adebayo		(gold) Winner
