= 1994 African Badminton Championships =

Tournament details
- Dates: 8–17 July
- Edition: 7th
- Venue: University of Port Elizabeth
- Location: Port Elizabeth, South Africa

The 1994 African Badminton Championships were the continental badminton championships to crown the best players and teams across Africa. The tournament was held at the University of Port Elizabeth in Port Elizabeth, South Africa, from 8 to 17 July 1994.

In the team event, South Africa defeated Nigeria while Mauritius defeated Namibia in the semi-finals. In the final, Mauritius lead 2–0 before going down 3–2 to South Africa. South Africa, Nigeria and Mauritius also dominated the individual events.

== Medalists ==
Event	Gold	Silver	Bronze
Men's singles	(Mauritius) Eddy Clarisse	(South Africa) Johan Kleingeld	(Nigeria) Danjuma Fatauchi
Men's singles	(Mauritius) Eddy Clarisse	(South Africa) Johan Kleingeld	(Nigeria) Agarawu Tunde
Women's singles	(South Africa) Lina Fourie	(Mauritius) Martine de Souza	(Nigeria) Dayo Oyewusi
Women's singles	(South Africa) Lina Fourie	(Mauritius) Martine de Souza	(Mauritius) Marie-Josephe Jean-Pierre
Men's doubles	(South Africa) Nico Meerholz (South Africa) Alan Phillips	(Mauritius) Stephan Beeharry (Mauritius) Eddy Clarisse	(Namibia) Lennerd Benade (Namibia) Tyrone Kloppers
Men's doubles	(South Africa) Nico Meerholz (South Africa) Alan Phillips	(Mauritius) Stephan Beeharry (Mauritius) Eddy Clarisse	(Nigeria) Danjuma Fatauchi (Nigeria) Agarawu Tunde
Women's doubles	(South Africa) Lina Fourie (South Africa) Tracey Thompson	(Mauritius) Marie-Josephe Jean-Pierre (Mauritius) Martine de Souza	(Nigeria) Obiageli Olorunsola (Nigeria) Bisi Tiamiyu
Women's doubles	(South Africa) Lina Fourie (South Africa) Tracey Thompson	(Mauritius) Marie-Josephe Jean-Pierre (Mauritius) Martine de Souza	(Namibia) Bianca Kustner (Namibia) Heidi Spinas
Mixed doubles	(South Africa) Alan Phillips (South Africa) Augusta Phillips	(South Africa) Johan Kleingeld (South Africa) Lina Fourie	(South Africa) Nico Meerholz (South Africa) Tracey Thompson
Mixed doubles	(South Africa) Alan Phillips (South Africa) Augusta Phillips	(South Africa) Johan Kleingeld (South Africa) Lina Fourie	(Mauritius) Stephan Beeharry (Mauritius) Marie-Josephe Jean-Pierre
Mixed team	South Africa; Johan Kleingeld; Nico Meerholz; Alan Phillips; Lina Fourie; Tracey Thompson; Monique Till	Mauritius; Stephan Beeharry; Eddy Clarisse; Marie-Josephe Jean-Pierre; Martine de Souza	Nigeria; Danjuma Fatauchi; Tamuno Gibson; Agarawu Tunde; Obiageli Olorunsola; Dayo Oyewusi; Bisi Tiamiyu
Mixed team	South Africa; Johan Kleingeld; Nico Meerholz; Alan Phillips; Lina Fourie; Tracey Thompson; Monique Till	Mauritius; Stephan Beeharry; Eddy Clarisse; Marie-Josephe Jean-Pierre; Martine de Souza	Namibia; Lennerd Benade; Tyrone Kloppers; Leon Koch; Eddie Ward; Bianca Kustner; Ella Scholtz; Heidi Spinas

=== Medal table ===
* Host nation (South Africa)

Rank	Nation	Gold	Silver	Bronze	Total
1	South Africa*	5	2	1	8
2	Mauritius	1	4	2	7
3	Nigeria	0	0	6	6
4	Namibia	0	0	3	3
Totals (4 entries)		6	6	12	24
