= Lisa Martinez =

Lisa Martinez may refer to:

- Lisa Martínez (softball)
- Lisa Martinez (footballer)
