= Lyes =

Lyes (Arabic: لياس) is a masculine given name of Arabic origin. Notable people with this name include:

== Given name ==
=== Lyes ===
- Lyes Boukria (born 1981), Algerian football player
- Lyes Cherifi (born 1968), Algerian judoka
- Lyes Houri (born 1996), French football player
- Lyes Oukkal (born 1991), Algerian football player
- Lyes Salem (born 1973), Algerian actor and film director

=== Lyès ===
- Lyès Bouyacoub (born 1983), Algerian heavyweight judoka
- Lyès Deriche (1928–2001), Algerian politician
- Lyès Saïdi (born 1987), Algerian football player

== See also ==
- Lye
