= Bacsa (surname) =

Bacsa is a surname of Hungarian origin. Notable people with the surname include:

- Patrik Bacsa (born 1992), Hungarian footballer
- Péter Bacsa (born 1970), Hungarian wrestler
