= Yuan Chao =

Chinese judoka

Personal information
- Nationality: Chinese
- Born: 16 December 1974 (age 51)

Sport
- Sport: Judo
Medal record
Representing China
Summer Universiade
Bronze medal – third place	1995 Fukuoka	-78 kg

Yuan Chao (born 16 December 1974) is a former Chinese judoka. He competed in the men's half-middleweight event at the 1996 Summer Olympics.
