= Samuel Álvarez =

Mexican boxer (born 1974)

Personal information
- Nationality: Mexican
- Born: 22 February 1974 (age 51)

Sport
- Sport: Boxing

Samuel Álvarez (born 22 February 1974) is a Mexican boxer. He competed in the men's bantamweight event at the 1996 Summer Olympics.
