= Ricky Dixon =

Nicaraguan judoka

Personal information
- Nationality: Nicaraguan
- Born: 29 October 1969 (age 55)

Sport
- Sport: Judo

Ricky Dixon (born 29 October 1969) is a Nicaraguan judoka. He competed in the men's half-middleweight event at the 1996 Summer Olympics.
