= Marcos Vernal =

Colombian boxer (born 1973)

Personal information
- Nationality: Colombian
- Born: 22 November 1973 (age 51)

Sport
- Sport: Boxing

Marcos Vernal (born 22 November 1973) is a Colombian boxer. He competed in the men's bantamweight event at the 1996 Summer Olympics.
