= Bashir Bhola Bhala =

Pakistani wrestler (born 1971)

Personal information
- Nationality: Pakistani
- Born: 20 January 1971 (age 55)

Sport
- Sport: Wrestling
Medal record
Commonwealth Games
Bronze medal – third place	2002 Manchester	Freestyle 96 kg

Bashir Bhola Bhala (born 20 January 1971) is a Pakistani wrestler. He competed in the men's freestyle 90 kg at the 1996 Summer Olympics.
