= Lo Yu-wei =

Taiwanese judoka (born 1969)

Personal information
- Nationality: Taiwanese
- Born: 4 July 1969 (age 55)

Sport
- Sport: Judo

Lo Yu-wei (born 4 July 1969) is a Taiwanese judoka. He competed in the men's half-middleweight event at the 1996 Summer Olympics.
