= Steve Naraina =

Mauritian boxer (born 1966)

Personal information
- Nationality: Mauritian
- Born: 23 October 1966 (age 58)

Sport
- Sport: Boxing

Steve Naraina (born 23 October 1966) is a Mauritian boxer. He competed in the men's bantamweight event at the 1996 Summer Olympics.
