= Ramon Sandin =

Puerto Rican diver

Personal information
- Born: 9 January 1970 (age 55)

Sport
- Sport: Diving

Ramon Sandin, also known as Guy Sandin, (born 9 January 1970) is a native of Puerto Rico who competed in the diving competitions at the 1996 Summer Olympics held in the United States at Atlanta, Georgia, representing his native island.

Sandin came out as being a gay man in 2000. He later moved to Los Angeles, where he pursued an acting career under the name of Guy Sandin.
