= Zahir Raheem =

American boxer (born 1976)

Personal information
- Nicknames: King Raheem; Z-Man
- Nationality: American
- Born: November 7, 1976 (age 49) Philadelphia, Pennsylvania
- Height: 5 ft 6 in (168 cm)
- Weight: Lightweight; Featherweight

Boxing career
- Reach: 70 in (178 cm)
- Stance: Orthodox

Boxing record
- Total fights: 39
- Wins: 35
- Win by KO: 21
- Losses: 3
- No contests: 1

Zahir Raheem (born November 7, 1976) is an American boxer. Known as "King Raheem", his current professional record stands at 35 wins, 3 losses with 21 knockouts.

== Amateur career ==
Raheem enjoyed a stellar amateur career, which included a 213–4 record, 15–1 against international competition, and a spot in the 1996 U.S. Olympic team.

== Professional career ==
He turned professional on November 16, 1996, with a 4th-round KO win over Clifford Watford. Being among the less touted of the '96 U.S. Olympians, Raheem worked his way up the rankings slowly, before finally receiving a shot against Rocky Juarez. Raheem lost to Juarez.

Raheem's next big fight was against legendary Mexican Erik Morales on September 10, 2005, in the Staples Center in Los Angeles. Morales was a heavy favorite and the matchup was viewed as warmup for his already scheduled superfight against Manny Pacquiao. Raheem surprised everyone by dominating the fight from the beginning by using excellent footwork and body movement, and never let Morales find his rhythm. Raheem won by unanimous decision, winning Ring Magazine upset of the year for 2005, and cemented himself as a lightweight contender.

On April 29, 2006, Zahir Raheem lost by split decision against Acelino Freitas for the recently vacated WBO Lightweight title. This was Raheem's first world title fight. On July 5, 2008, Raheem was knocked out by a South African boxer Ali Funeka.

== Amateur Highlights ==
Won the Bantamweight Olympic Trials in 1996, by defeating the following boxers:

- Rosendo Sanchez (points)
- Teaunce Shepherd (points)
- Steve Carter (points)
- Steve Carter (points), this bout was at the Olympic Box-Offs in Augusta, GA

At the 1996 Atlanta Olympic Games, Raheem lost in the second round. His results were:

- Jong-Gil Oh (North Korea) won on points
- Arnaldo Mesa (Cuba) lost by TKO 1

== Professional boxing record ==
39 fights	35 wins	3 losses
By knockout	21	1
By decision	14	2
No contests	1	

Key to abbreviations used for results
DQ	Disqualification	RTD	Corner retirement
KO	Knockout	SD	Split decision / split draw
MD	Majority decision / majority draw	TD	Technical decision / technical draw
NC	No contest	TKO	Technical knockout
PTS	Points decision	UD	Unanimous decision / unanimous draw

Boxing record
No.	Result	Record	Opponent	Type	Round(s), time	Date	Location	Notes
39	Win	35–3 (1)	Bayan Jargal	UD	10	Jan 10, 2014	Emerald Queen Casino, Tacoma, Washington, U.S.	Won vacant WBO-NABO light welterweight title
38	Win	34–3 (1)	Tim Coleman	TKO	2 (10), 2:04	Nov 2, 2013	Emerald Queen Casino, Tacoma, Washington, U.S.	
37	Win	33–3 (1)	Justin Juuko	TKO	4 (10), 0:27	Jun 1, 2013	Emerald Queen Casino, Tacoma, Washington, U.S.	
36	Win	32–3 (1)	Santos Pakau	TKO	2 (10), 2:20	Mar 23, 2013	Emerald Queen Casino, Tacoma, Washington, U.S.	
35	Win	31–3 (1)	Roberto Valenzuela	KO	2 (6), 2:56	Aug 27, 2010	Westin Hotel Peachetree Plaza, Atlanta, Georgia, U.S.	
34	Win	30–3 (1)	Roberto Valenzuela	UD	6	Apr 22, 2010	Crowne Plaza Hotel, Tulsa, Oklahoma, U.S.	
33	Loss	29–3 (1)	Ali Funeka	KO	4 (12)	Jul 5, 2008	Jan Smuts Stadium, East London, South Africa	
32	Win	29–2 (1)	Ricardo Domínguez	KO	1 (8), 1:18	Jan 4, 2008	Million Dollar Elm Casino, Tulsa, Oklahoma, U.S.	
31	Win	28–2 (1)	Cristóbal Cruz	UD	10	May 18, 2007	Million Dollar Elm Casino, Tulsa, Oklahoma, U.S.	
30	NC	27–2 (1)	Armando Córdoba	NC	8	Jan 26, 2007	Million Dollar Elm Casino, Tulsa, Oklahoma, U.S.	Originally a UD win for Raheem, overturned to NC
29	Loss	27–2	Acelino Freitas	SD	12	Apr 29, 2006	Foxwoods Resort, Ledyard, Connecticut, U.S.	For vacant WBO lightweight title
28	Win	27–1	Erik Morales	UD	12	Sep 10, 2005	Staples Center, Los Angeles, California, U.S.	Won vacant WBC International lightweight title
27	Win	26–1	José Quintana	TKO	6 (8), 2:51	Feb 26, 2005	Coliseo Rubén Rodríguez, Bayamón, Puerto Rico	
26	Loss	25–1	Rocky Juarez	UD	12	Jul 17, 2004	Reliant Center, Houston, Texas, U.S.	For WBC Continental Americas featherweight title
25	Win	25–0	Rodney Jones	TKO	1 (8), 2:16	Apr 22, 2004	Adam's Mark Hotel, Tulsa, Oklahoma, U.S.	
24	Win	24–0	Agustín Lorenzo	KO	1 (8), 0:59	Jul 25, 2003	Creek Nation Gaming Center, Tulsa, Oklahoma, U.S.	
23	Win	23–0	Ablorh Sowah	TKO	4 (10), 1:40	Jun 24, 2003	HSBC Arena, Buffalo, New York, U.S.	
22	Win	22–0	Juan Polo Pérez	KO	3 (8), 2:30	Mar 28, 2003	Creek Nation Gaming Center, Tulsa, Oklahoma, U.S.	
21	Win	21–0	Isidro Tejedor	UD	10	Feb 24, 2003	Thunderbird Wild West Casino, Norman, Oklahoma, U.S.	
20	Win	20–0	Luisito Espinosa	TKO	8 (10), 2:02	Oct 11, 2002	Creek Nation Gaming Center, Tulsa, Oklahoma, U.S.	
19	Win	19–0	Joe Morales	UD	12	Mar 30, 2002	Lucky Star Casino, Concho, Oklahoma, U.S.	Won WBA-NABA featherweight title
18	Win	18–0	Benito Rodríguez	TKO	4 (10), 1:04	Mar 9, 2002	Belterra Casino, Elizabeth, Indiana, U.S.	
17	Win	17–0	Steve Trumble	TKO	2 (8), 2:41	Nov 24, 2001	Lucky Star Casino, Concho, Oklahoma, U.S.	
16	Win	16–0	Ricardo Medina	KO	5 (8), 0:29	Aug 24, 2001	Harrah's Hotel & Casino, Reno, Nevada, U.S.	
15	Win	15–0	Stephen Rose	KO	1 (8), 0:58	Sep 23, 2000	Casino Rama, Rama, Canada	
14	Win	14–0	Russell Stoner Jones	UD	8	May 2, 2000	Big O Center, Philadelphia, Pennsylvania, U.S.	
13	Win	13–0	Pasqual Rouse	MD	6	Jan 29, 1999	Foxwoods Resort, Ledyard, Connecticut, U.S.	
12	Win	12–0	Shawn Powell	TKO	5 (6)	Sep 25, 1998	Foxwoods Resort, Ledyard, Connecticut, U.S.	
11	Win	11–0	Adam Salas	PTS	6	Jun 13, 1998	Trump Taj Mahal, Atlantic City, New Jersey, U.S.	
10	Win	10–0	Billy Gates	UD	6	May 5, 1998	Grand Casino, Biloxi, Mississippi, U.S.	
9	Win	9–0	Garvin Crout	KO	3 (6)	Mar 14, 1998	Trump Taj Mahal, Atlantic City, New Jersey, U.S.	
8	Win	8–0	Terry Smith	TKO	4 (6), 1:22	Dec 6, 1997	Caesars Hotel & Casino, Atlantic City, New Jersey, U.S.	
7	Win	7–0	Lionel Odom	TKO	5 (6), 0:53	Sep 19, 1997	Ballys Park Place Hotel Casino, Atlantic City, New Jersey, U.S.	
6	Win	6–0	Scott Buck	PTS	6	May 14, 1997	Foxwoods Resort, Ledyard, Connecticut, U.S.	
5	Win	5–0	Jose Covarrubias	SD	6	Mar 12, 1997	Stadium Arena, Grand Rapids, Michigan, U.S.	
4	Win	4–0	Tim Sala	TKO	2 (4)	Feb 22, 1997	Mohegan Sun Casino, Uncasville, Connecticut, U.S.	
3	Win	3–0	Dennis Roberts	UD	4	Jan 10, 1997	Mohegan Sun Casino, Uncasville, Connecticut, U.S.	
2	Win	2–0	Ramón Aragón	UD	4	Dec 6, 1996	Lawlor Events Center, Reno, Nevada, U.S.	
1	Win	1–0	Cliff Watford	TKO	4 (4)	Nov 16, 1996	Ballys Park Place Hotel Casino, Atlantic City, New Jersey, U.S.	
