= Gábor Szabó (judoka) =

Australian judoka

Personal information
- Nationality: Australian
- Born: 6 December 1967 (age 57); Budapest, Hungary

Sport
- Sport: Judo

Gábor Szabó (born 6 December 1967) is an Australian judoka. He competed in the men's half-middleweight event at the 1996 Summer Olympics.
