= Gabriel Križan =

Slovak boxer

Personal information
- Nationality: Slovak
- Born: 10 January 1976 (age 49); Bratislava, Czechoslovakia

Sport
- Sport: Boxing

Gabriel Križan (born 10 January 1976) is a Slovak boxer. He competed in the men's bantamweight event at the 1996 Summer Olympics.
