= Djamel Bouras =

French judoka (born 1971)

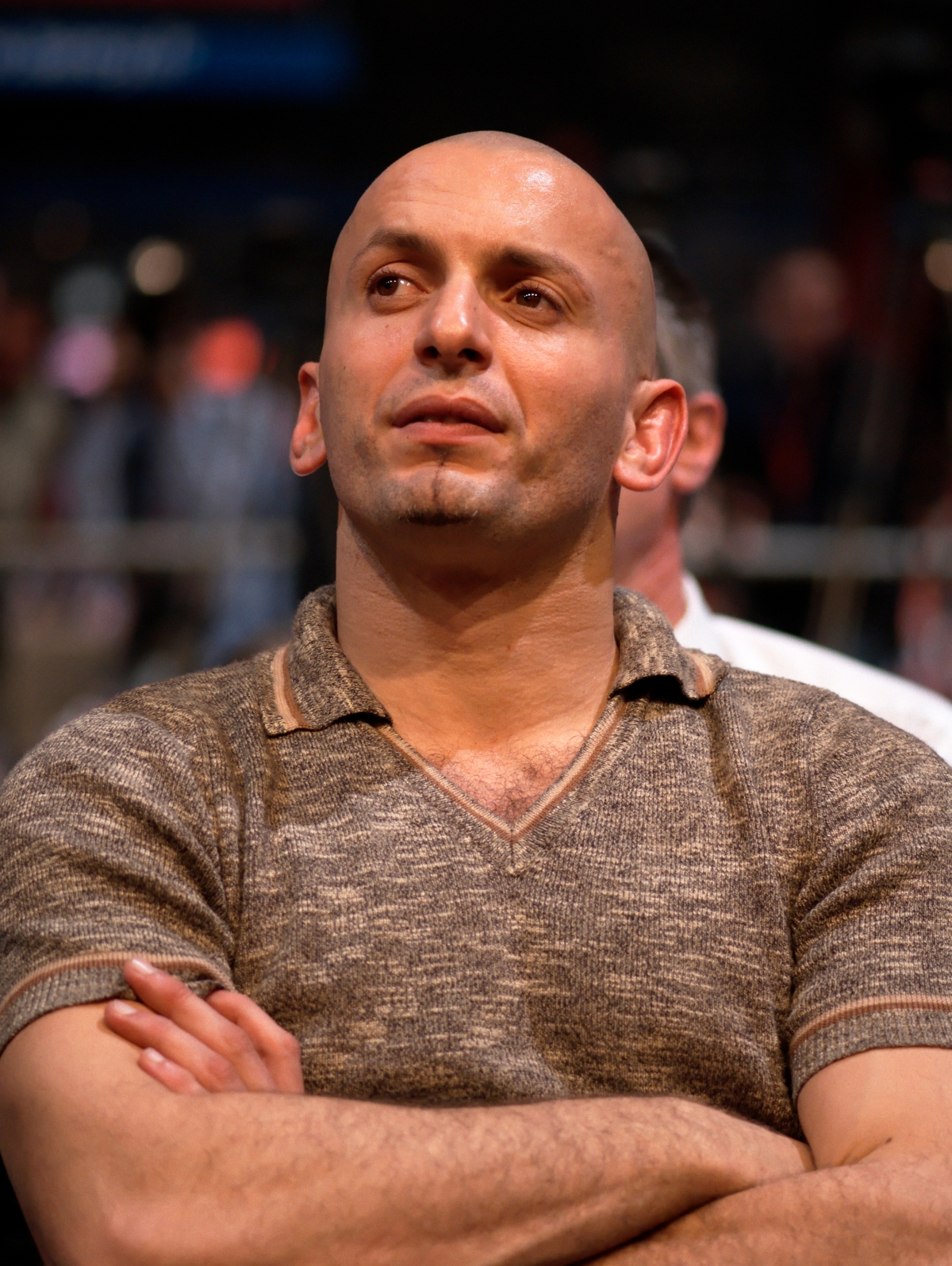

Personal information
- Born: 21 August 1971 (age 54)
- Occupation: Judoka

Sport
- Country: France
- Sport: Judo
- Weight class: ‍–‍78 kg, ‍–‍81 kg

Achievements and titles
- Olympic Games: (gold) (1996)
- World Champ.: (silver) (1997)
- European Champ.: (gold) (1996)
Medal record
Men's judo
Representing France
Olympic Games
Gold medal – first place	1996 Atlanta	‍–‍78 kg
World Championships
Silver medal – second place	1997 Paris	‍–‍78 kg
Bronze medal – third place	1995 Chiba	‍–‍78 kg
European Championships
Gold medal – first place	1996 The Hague	‍–‍78 kg
Silver medal – second place	1995 Birmingham	‍–‍78 kg
Silver medal – second place	1997 Oostende	‍–‍78 kg
Bronze medal – third place	1999 Bratislava	‍–‍81 kg

Profile at external databases
- IJF: 53198
- JudoInside.com: 2426
- Updated on 4 June 2023

Djamel Bouras (born 11 August 1971 in Givors, Rhône) is a French judoka of Algerian origin.

He won a gold medal in the 1996 Olympic Games in Atlanta.

== See also ==
- List of sportspeople sanctioned for doping offences
