= Agathangelos Tsiripidis =

Greek boxer (born 1963)

Personal information
- Nationality: Greek
- Born: 4 May 1963 (age 61); Tbilisi, Georgian SSR, Soviet Union

Sport
- Sport: Boxing

Agathangelos Tsiripidis (born 4 May 1963) is a Greek boxer. He competed in the men's bantamweight event at the 1996 Summer Olympics.
