= Dingko Singh =

Indian boxer (1979–2021)

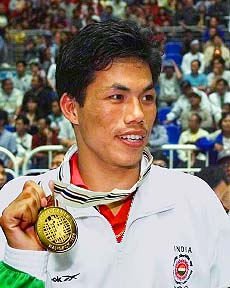
- Dingko displays his gold medal during the awarding ceremony for the 54kg class boxing final in the 13th Asian Games.

Personal information
- Full name: Ngangom Dingko Singh
- Nationality: India
- Born: 1 January 1979 Manipur, India
- Died: 10 June 2021 (aged 42)
- Weight: 54 kg (119 lb)
- Military career
- Allegiance: India
- Branch: Indian Navy
- Rank: Master Chief Petty Officer 1st Class
- Awards: Padma Shri; Arjuna Award

Sport
- Sport: Boxing
- Weight class: Bantamweight
Medal record
Representing India
Asian Games
Gold medal – first place	1998 Bangkok	Bantamweight

Master Chief Petty Officer Ngangom Dingko Singh (1 January 1979 – 10 June 2021) was an Indian boxer who won the gold medal at 1998 Asian Games in Bangkok. He was from the North-eastern Indian state of Manipur. He was awarded the Padma Shri by the Government of India in 2013.

== Achievements ==
Ngangom Dingko Singh, commonly known as Dingko Singh, was an Indian boxer. He is considered to have been one of the most outstanding boxers India ever produced. He won the King's Cup in Bangkok in 1997 and the Asian Games gold in the 1998 Bangkok Games. He was a service personnel of the Indian Navy.

== Early life ==
He was born on 1 January 1979 in a remote village called Sekta, in the Imphal East District, Manipur to a very poor family. Dingko had to fight back adversities from the beginning of his life, and was brought up in an orphanage.

== National boxing ==
The trainers at a Special Area Games Scheme initiated by the Sports Authority of India identified the hidden talents of Dingko during the assessment camp from Dec. 1990 to Jan. 1991 at Khuman Lampak, Imphal. He was inducted at SAI SAG Khuman Lampak, Imphal w.e.f. 12 Feb. 1991 and trained under the guidance of Boxing coach Shri. Leishangthem Ibomcha Singh. In the same year, 20-26 Nov. 1991, in his debut at National level championship, he won gold medal in the 7th Sub. Jr. National Boxing Championship in the age group 12 years (E-2) at Ambala. This achievement brought Dingko into the eyes of the selectors and coaches, who began to see him as a promising boxing star of India .

== International boxing ==
He made his debut into the arena of international boxing in 1997, and won the King's cup 1997 held at Bangkok, Thailand. Apart from winning the tournament, Dingko Singh was also declared the best boxer of the meet. He also represented India at the 1998 Asian Games and at the 2000 Summer Olympics.

He was selected for the Indian boxing squad which participated at the Asian Games in Bangkok in 1998. For unknown reasons he was dropped from the team at the last minute and dejected Dingko went on a drinking spree, collapsing after a long session of drinks. Eventually he was selected and the event proved to be pinnacle of his career as he created history by winning the gold medal in the 54 kg Bantamweight category.

In his journey to the gold, Dingko achieved a major upset by defeating Wong Prages Sontaya, an excellent boxer from Thailand in the semifinal match. Dingko's victory was a surprise.

One of the most glorious moments in the boxing event of the Bangkok Asian Games of 1998 arrived when Dingko fought the well known boxer from Uzbekistan, Timur Tulyakov in the final match. At that time, Timur held the No. 5 ranking in the division in the world. Dingko had just moved up to the 54 kg category from the 51 kg a few months back before winning the gold, which made his victory a lot more impressive. During the match, he proved to be far better than his opponent, and Timur had to retire after the fourth round of the fight.

== Awards and honors ==
To commemorate his excellence in the sport of boxing, and his extraordinary contribution to the nation by his consistent efforts and dedication, Dingko Singh was honored with the Arjuna Award in 1998 and later with the Padma Shri Award, the country's fourth-highest civilian award, in 2013.

== Death ==
He died, on Thursday 10 June 2021, after a long battle with liver cancer as well as post COVID-19 complications. He had been fighting the disease since 2017.

== Personal life ==
Dingko did not go professional like other boxers as he was a service personnel of the Indian Navy. He was a boxing coach and a very respected figure in the Indian Navy.

== Media ==
A movie inspired by his life was said to be in the making. It would have starred Shahid Kapoor, and be directed by Raja Krishna Menon. However, this project has now been shelved.
