= Louis Purcell =

American Samoan wrestler (born 1974)

Louis Purcell (born 24 October 1974) is a wrestler from American Samoa.

Purcell competed at the 1996 Summer Olympics in the wrestling 90 kg.
