= Hoe Jong-jil =

North Korean boxer

Personal information
- Nationality: North Korean
- Born: 15 August 1972 (age 52)

Sport
- Sport: Boxing

Hoe Jong-jil (born 15 August 1972) is a North Korean boxer. He competed in the men's bantamweight event at the 1996 Summer Olympics.
