= Bronisław Wołkowicz =

Polish judoka

Bronisław Wołkowicz (born 21 October 1973) is a Polish judoka. He competed in the men's half-middleweight event at the 1996 Summer Olympics.

== Achievements ==
Year	Tournament	Place	Weight class
2001	European Judo Championships	5th	Half middleweight (81 kg)
1996	European Judo Championships	7th	Half middleweight (78 kg)
