= Dragoljub Radulović =

Serbian judoka

Personal information
- Nationality: Serbian
- Born: 20 March 1964 (age 61)

Sport
- Sport: Judo

Dragoljub Radulović (born 20 March 1964) is a Serbian judoka. He competed in the men's half-middleweight event at the 1996 Summer Olympics.
