= Rachid Bouaita =

French boxer

Rachid Bouaita (born September 20, 1974, in Maubeuge, Nord) is a retired boxer from France, who competed for his country at two consecutive Summer Olympics, starting in 1996. His best result was finishing in fifth place after being defeated by Cuba's eventual silver medalist Arnaldo Mesa.
