= María Dolores Gonzáles =

María Dolores Gonzáles may refer to:

- María Dolores Gonzáles (educator) (1917–1975), educator in New Mexico
- María Dolores Gonzales (author) (born 1946), Mexican-American author and educator
