= Penelope Rosario =

Puerto Rican softball player

Personal information
- Nationality: Puerto Rican
- Born: 20 July 1970 (age 56)

Sport
- Sport: Softball

Penelope Rosario (born 20 July 1970) is a Puerto Rican softball player. She competed in the women's tournament at the 1996 Summer Olympics.
