= Clara Vázquez =

Puerto Rican softball player

Personal information
- Nationality: Puerto Rican
- Born: 27 April 1961 (age 65)

Sport
- Sport: Softball

Clara Vázquez (born 27 April 1961) is a Puerto Rican softball player. She competed in the women's tournament at the 1996 Summer Olympics. As well as competing at the Olympics, Vázquez was part of Puerto Rico's team that won silver medals at the 1987 Pan American Games and the 1995 Pan American Games. In 2003, she was inducted into the World Baseball Softball Confederation's hall of fame.
