= Carlos Bodega =

Puerto Rican swimmer (born 1975)

Personal information
- Born: 1 September 1975 (age 50) San Juan PR

Sport
- Sport: Swimming
- Strokes: IM and Backstroke
- Club: Bolles
- College team: University of Alabama / Sagrado Corazon

Carlos Bodega (born 1 September 1975) is a Puerto Rican Olympic swimmer. He competed in the men's 4x100 metre medley relay event at the 1996 Summer Olympics. Participated in the 1995 short course World Championships in Rio de Janeiro Brazil, World University Games in 1997 Sicily, Italy and 1999 Palma de Mayorca, Spain. Also won the bronze medal in the 200 IM at the 1993 Central American Games in Ponce PR. Swam and graduated High School at the Bolles School, under Coach Greg Troy in Jacksonville Florida. Attended the University of Alabama in Tuscaloosa, Alabama, where he competed for the Alabama Crimson Tide swimming and diving team. Finished his College education and swimming career in the University of Sagrado Corazon in Puerto Rico. In 1998 was named Athlete of the year for Sagrado Corazon and Swimmer of the year for the LAI athletic Association. Member of the first class Hall of Fame of Caparra Country club Swimming in Puerto Rico.
