= Maria Gonzalez Roesch =

Costa Rican actress

- María González Roesch
- Born: June 6, 1992 (age 34); San José, Costa Rica
- Education: University of Costa Rica (BBA)
- Occupations: TV presenter, actress, social media activist
- Notable work: RG Elementos (RG Elements) (2004-2007) Buscando a Marcos Ramirez (Searching for Marcos Ramirez)
- Website: https://mariagonzalezroesch.com/

María González Roesch is a Costa Rican actress, TV presenter, model, and social media personality best known for the weekly show RG Elementos, that aired from 1976 to 2016, and the 2017 movie Buscando a Marcos Ramirez.

== Acting career ==
She began acting at the age of 12 for the local TV show Recreo Grande, which later became RG Elementos, until she was 15. She pursued a career in modeling landing some photoshoots and fashion shows in her teenage years.

She stepped out of the local media and focused on earning her bachelor's degree from the University San Judas Tadeo

In 2017 she co-starred in the novel-based movie of Carlos Luis Fallas, Buscando a Marcos Ramirez, a box office success in her home country.
