= Raimkul Malakhbekov =

Russian boxer (born 1974)

Personal information
- Full name: Раимкуль Хадойназарович Малахбеков
- Nationality: Russia
- Born: 16 August 1974 (age 51) Dushanbe, Tajik SSR, Soviet Union
- Height: 1.68 m (5 ft 6 in)
- Weight: 54 kg (119 lb)

Sport
- Sport: Boxing
- Weight class: Bantamweight
- Club: Dynamo
Medal record
Olympic Games
Silver medal – second place	2000 Sydney	Bantamweight
Bronze medal – third place	1996 Atlanta	Bantamweight
World Amateur Championships
Gold medal – first place	1995 Berlin	Bantamweight
Gold medal – first place	1997 Budapest	Bantamweight
European Amateur Championships
Gold medal – first place	1993 Bursa	Bantamweight
Gold medal – first place	2002 Perm	Featherweight
Silver medal – second place	1996 Vejle	Bantamweight
Silver medal – second place	2000 Tampere	Bantamweight
Bronze medal – third place	1998 Minsk	Bantamweight

Raimkul Khudoynazarovich Malakhbekov (Russian: Раимкуль Худойназарович Малахбеков; born 16 August 1974 in Dushanbe, Tajik SSR) is one of highest titled boxers of Russia, who won two Olympic medals in the Men's Bantamweight (54 kg) category.

== Biography ==
Malakhbekovs origins take root in Badakhshan of Tajikistan, which is also known as Pamir. He graduated from the Tajik Institute of Physical Culture, majoring in boxing. His interest and passion for boxing grew when as a kid he visited the Dushanbe Sports Palace with his older brothers, who were training as boxers.

It is in Dushanbe that he met his future coach and mentor, Tsiren Balzanov (Russian: Цирен Санджеевич Балзанов), who was initially his trainer in Dushanbe and, after leaving for his native Republic of Kalmykia in the Russian Federation, invited Raimkul to Kalmykia.

Although born and brought up in Tajikistan, Balzanov left after a civil war engulfed Tajikistan and his grandfather's name, noble status and part of property were rehabilitated. His grandfather is said to have been from a noble family, had high military rank, and numerous honors for his heroism in World War I, who was subjected to repression and expulsion to Kangurt of Tajikistan, where Balzanov was born.

In 1993, at the age of 19 Malakhbekov left a Tajikistan devastated by civil war for Russia to seek better opportunities. Initially, he settled in Moscow, but after reconnecting with his former trainer Balzanov he moved to Elista and resumed his boxing career. The right mixture of his unique physical conditioning, hard work and determination noticed by his trainer promised a bright boxing career.

== Boxing Career and achievements ==
In his boxing career Malakhbekov won two Olympic medals in the Men's Bantamweight (54 kg) category. He also won the title at the World Amateur Boxing Championships in 1995 and 1997, and the European title in 1993 in Bursa, Turkey and 2002 in Perm, Russia. During his boxing career he has won seven times the Russian National Championships and numerous other tournaments. He was also among the winners of the 1998 Goodwill Games in New York USA.

== Olympic results ==
1996 (bronze medalist)

- Defeated José Miguel Cotto (Puerto Rico) 16–6
- Defeated Abdelaziz Boulehia (Algeria) RSC 3 (2:52)
- Defeated Davaatseren Jamgan (Mongolia) 21–9
- Lost to Arnaldo Mesa (Cuba) 14-14, referee decision

2000 (silver medalist)

- Defeated Ceferino Labarda (Argentina) RSC 3
- Defeated Theimuraz Khurtsilava (Georgia) 13–7
- Defeated Alisher Rahimov (Uzbekistan) 16–10
- Defeated Sergey Danilchenko (Ukraine) 15–10
- Lost to Guillermo Rigondeaux Ortiz (Cuba) 12–18

== End of Boxing Career ==
Malakhbekov officially ended his career after his last fight at the European Championship in Perm in 2002, in which he won the gold medal. He said in an interview to a journalist that "the sport is becoming more and more business oriented, rather than art oriented".

== Personal life ==
Malakhbekov is married to Sokina and lives in Elista. His hobby is cars. He loves cars and owns a Jaguar. He is enjoying his new profession of politician as a delegate to the parliament of Kalmykia and an advisor to the President for Physical Education and Sports. He also enjoys the status of an Honored Hero of Kalmykia and Honored Master of Sports of Russia, Order of Friendship and Order for Merits before the country of second degree.
