= Edit Klocker =

Hungarian swimmer (born 1979)

Personal information
- Born: 16 October 1979 (age 46) Baja, Hungary
- Height: 1.75 m (5 ft 9 in)
- Weight: 54 kg (119 lb)

Sport
- Sport: Swimming
- Club: Budapesti Spartacus SC
Medal record
Women's swimming
Representing Hungary
European Championships
Silver medal – second place	1995 Vienna	4×100 m medley

Edit Klocker (born 16 October 1979) is a retired Hungarian butterfly swimmer who won a silver medal in the 4×100 m medley relay at the 1995 European Aquatics Championships. She also competed in the 100 m and 200 m butterfly and 4×100 m medley relay events at the 1996 Summer Olympics.
