= Patrick Klas =

Dutch judoka

Personal information
- Nationality: Dutch
- Born: 22 November 1975 (age 49); Tilburg, Netherlands

Sport
- Sport: Judo

Patrick Klas (born 22 November 1975) is a Dutch judoka. He competed in the men's half-middleweight event at the 1996 Summer Olympics.
