= Eve Soto =

Puerto Rican softball player

Personal information
- Nationality: Puerto Rican
- Born: 19 July 1967 (age 59)

Sport
- Sport: Softball

Eve Soto (born 19 July 1967) is a Puerto Rican softball player. She competed in the women's tournament at the 1996 Summer Olympics.
