= Soner Karagöz =

Turkish boxer (born 1972)

Personal information
- Nationality: Turkish
- Born: 3 January 1972 (age 53)

Sport
- Sport: Boxing

Soner Karagöz (born 3 January 1972) is a Turkish boxer. He competed in the men's bantamweight event at the 1996 Summer Olympics.
