= Hicham Nafil =

Moroccan boxer (born 1975)

Personal information
- Nickname: Le Scorpion
- Nationality: Moroccan
- Born: 5 June 1975 (age 49)
- Height: 180 cm (5 ft 11 in)
- Weight: 64 kg (141 lb)

Sport
- Sport: Boxing

Hicham Nafil (born 5 June 1975) is a Moroccan former boxer. He competed in the men's bantamweight at the 1996 Summer Olympics and in the light welterweight at the 2004 Summer Olympics.
