= Sheree Corniel =

Puerto Rican softball player

Personal information
- Nationality: Puerto Rican
- Born: 19 August 1969 (age 57)

Sport
- Sport: Softball

Sheree Corniel (born 19 August 1969) is a Puerto Rican softball player. She competed in the women's tournament at the 1996 Summer Olympics, as well as in the 1995 Pan American Games.

In 1987, she played softball for University of Nevada, Las Vegas on an athletic scholarship. In 1995, she won a silver medal at the Pan American Games. Following her retirement, she worked as a probation officer in Las Vegas.
