= Iraklı Uznadze =

Turkish judoka

Personal information
- Born: 18 May 1972 (age 54)
- Occupation: Judoka

Sport
- Sport: Judo
Medal record
Men's judo
European Championships
Gold medal – first place	2002 Maribor	81 kg
Bronze medal – third place	1998 Oviedo	81 kg
Bronze medal – third place	2001 Paris	81 kg

Profile at external databases
- JudoInside.com: 655

Iraklı Uznadze (born May 18, 1972) is a Georgian-Turkish judoka. In 1994-95 he was fighting under name Irfan Toker.

== Achievements ==
Year	Tournament	Place	Weight class
2003	European Judo Championships	7th	Half middleweight (81 kg)
2002	European Judo Championships	1st	Half middleweight (81 kg)
2001	European Judo Championships	3rd	Half middleweight (81 kg)
1998	European Judo Championships	3rd	Half middleweight (81 kg)
1996	Olympic Games	7th	Half middleweight (78 kg)
1996	European Judo Championships	5th	Half middleweight (78 kg)
1995	European Judo Championships	3rd	Half middleweight (78 kg)
