= Soso Liparteliani =

Georgian judoka (born 1971)

Personal information
- Born: 3 February 1971 (age 55)
- Occupation: Judoka

Sport
- Country: Georgia
- Sport: Judo
- Weight class: ‍–‍78 kg

Achievements and titles
- Olympic Games: (bronze) (1996)
- World Champ.: 7th (1995)
- European Champ.: (silver) (1993)
Medal record
Men's judo
Representing Georgia
Olympic Games
Bronze medal – third place	1996 Atlanta	‍–‍78 kg
European Championships
Silver medal – second place	1993 Athens	‍–‍78 kg

Profile at external databases
- IJF: 1718
- JudoInside.com: 2648
- Updated on 4 June 2023

Soso Liparteliani (born 3 February 1971) is a Georgian judoka. At the 1996 Summer Olympics he won a bronze medal in the men's half middleweight category. In doing so, Liparteliani became the first Olympic medalist for Georgia. He is the uncle of Georgian judoka Eteri Liparteliani, who has competed at the 2020 and 2024 Olympics.

He was silver medalist 1993 European championships in Athens.

Champion International Tournament Tbilisi 1992, 1993, in Moscow 1995.
