= Lisa Mize =

Puerto Rican softball player

Personal information
- Nationality: Puerto Rican
- Born: 22 March 1971 (age 55)

Sport
- Sport: Softball

Lisa Mize (born 22 March 1971) is a Puerto Rican softball player. She competed in the women's tournament at the 1996 Summer Olympics.
