= John Larbi =

Swedish boxer

Personal information
- Born: 1977 (age 48–49)
Medal record
Men's Boxing
Representing Sweden
European Amateur Championships
Bronze medal – third place	1996 Vejle	Bantamweight

John Hamid Larbi (born 5 March 1977 in Gothenburg, Västra Götaland) is a boxer from Sweden, who won the bronze medal in the Men's Bantamweight (– 54 kg) division at the 1996 European Amateur Boxing Championships in Vejle, Denmark.

Larbi represented his native country at the 1996 Summer Olympics in Atlanta, Georgia. There he was stopped in the first round of the Men's Bantamweight division by Cuba's eventual silver medalist Arnaldo Mesa.
