= Kehinde Aweda =

Nigerian boxer

Personal information
- Nationality: Nigerian
- Born: 1 January 1975 (age 50)

Sport
- Sport: Boxing

Kehinde Ganiyu Aweda (born 1 January 1975) is a Nigerian boxer. He competed in the men's bantamweight event at the 1996 Summer Olympics.
