= Abdel Aziz Boulehia =

Algerian boxer (born 1970)

Personal information
- Nationality: Algerian
- Born: 3 August 1970 (age 56)

Sport
- Sport: Boxing

Abdel Aziz Boulehia (born 3 August 1970) is an Algerian boxer. He competed in the men's bantamweight event at the 1996 Summer Olympics.
