= Arsen Balayan =

Russian association football player

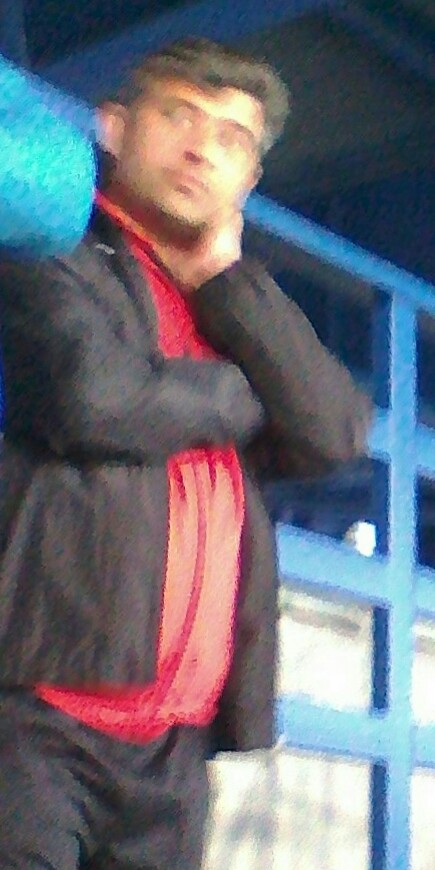

Personal information
- Full name: Arsen Aleksandrovich Balayan
- Date of birth: 29 April 1972 (age 54)
- Place of birth: Tashkent, Uzbek SSR, Soviet Union
- Height: 1.76 m (5 ft 9 in)
- Positions: Forward; midfielder

Senior career*
Years	Team	Apps	(Gls)
1990–1991	FC Sverdlovets Tashkent Oblast	34	(5)
1991	Traktor Tashkent	19	(2)
1991	Pakhtakor Tashkent FK	1	(0)
1992	FK Navruz Andijan	2	(0)
1992	FK Pakhtakor-79 Tashkent	2	(0)
1992	FC Fakel Voronezh	6	(0)
1992	FC Tekstilshchik Kamyshin	0	(0)
1992	→ FC Tekstilshchik-d Kamyshin	1	(0)
1992–1993	FC Vorskla Poltava	21	(1)
1993	FC Avangard Kamyshin	19	(0)
1994–1997	FC Don Novomoskovsk	136	(15)
1997	Chilanzar Tashkent	10	(0)
1998–2000	FC Don Novomoskovsk	51	(1)
2003	FC Don-Rubin Novomoskovsk		

Managerial career
- 2014–2019: FC Khimik Novomoskovsk (assistant)
- * Club domestic league appearances and goals

Arsen Aleksandrovich Balayan (Russian: Арсен Александрович Балаян; born 29 April 1972) is a Russian-Uzbekistani football manager and a former player.
