= Bob Renney =

Australian wrestler

Personal information
- Nationality: Australian
- Born: 18 March 1975 (age 51) Christchurch, Canterbury, New Zealand
- Height
- Weight

Robert John Renney (born 18 March 1975) is an Australian former wrestler who competed in the 1996 Summer Olympics.
