= José González (Puerto Rican swimmer) =

Puerto Rican swimmer (born 1977)

Personal information
- Born: 6 October 1977 (age 48)

Sport
- Sport: Swimming

José González (born 6 October 1977) is a Puerto Rican swimmer. He competed in two events at the 1996 Summer Olympics.
