= Elba Lebrón =

Puerto Rican softball player

Personal information
- Nationality: Puerto Rican
- Born: 4 March 1979 (age 47)

Sport
- Sport: Softball

Elba Lebrón (born 4 March 1979) is a Puerto Rican softball player. She competed in the women's tournament at the 1996 Summer Olympics.
