= Péter Sárfalvi =

Hungarian modern pentathlete

Personal information
- Nationality: Hungarian
- Born: 31 July 1970 (age 54); Budapest, Hungary

Sport
- Sport: Modern pentathlon

Péter Sárfalvi (born 31 July 1970) is a Hungarian modern pentathlete. He competed at the 1996 Summer Olympics and the 2000 Summer Olympics.
