= Karen Balayan =

Armenian-Ukrainian judoka

Personal information
- Born: 8 July 1975 (age 50)
- Occupation: Judoka

Sport
- Sport: Judo

Profile at external databases
- JudoInside.com: 473

Karen Balayan (born 8 July 1975) is an Armenian-Ukrainian judoka. He competed in the men's half-middleweight event at the 1996 Summer Olympics.

== Achievements ==
| Year | Tournament | Place | Weight class |
|---|---|---|---|
| 1996 | European Judo Championships | 7th | Half middleweight (78 kg) |
