= Abiodun Obafemi =

Nigerian footballer

Personal information
- Full name: Abiodun Olugbemiga Obafemi
- Date of birth: 25 December 1973 (age 52)
- Place of birth: Lagos, Nigeria
- Height: 1.84 m (6 ft 0 in)
- Position: Defender

Senior career*
Years	Team	Apps	(Gls)
1992–1993	Stationery Stores		
1993–1994	Fortuna Köln		
1994–1997	Fortuna Düsseldorf	1	(0)
1995–1996	→ Toulouse (loan)	25	(0)
1997–2000	SSV Reutlingen	41	(0)
2000–2001	FC Augsburg	9	(0)

International career
1997	Nigeria	2	(0)
Medal record
Men's Football
Representing Nigeria
Olympic Games
Gold medal – first place	1996 Atlanta	Team Competition
- * Club domestic league appearances and goals

Abiodun Olugbemiga Obafemi (born 25 December 1973) is a Nigerian former professional footballer. He is a defender who played most of his career in Germany, and was part of Nigeria's Gold Medal winning team at the 1996 Olympics.
