= Arnaldo Mesa =

Cuban boxer (1967–2012)

Personal information
- Born: December 6, 1967 Holguín, Cuba
- Died: December 17, 2012 (aged 45) Holguín, Cuba
Medal record
Men's Boxing
Representing Cuba
Olympic Games
Silver medal – second place	1996 Atlanta	Bantamweight
World Amateur Championships
Bronze medal – third place	1986 Reno	Bantamweight
Bronze medal – third place	1989 Moscow	Featherweight
Bronze medal – third place	1991 Sydney	Featherweight
Pan American Games
Gold medal – first place	1991 Havana	Featherweight
Gold medal – first place	1995 Mar del Plata	Featherweight

Arnaldo Mesa Bonell (6 December 1967 – 17 December 2012) was an amateur boxer from Cuba, who won the silver medal for his native country at the 1996 Summer Olympics in Atlanta, United States. In the final of the Bantamweight (– 54 kg) division he was defeated by Hungary's István Kovács. A year earlier, at the Pan American Games in Mar del Plata, he captured the gold medal in his division. In 1986 he already won the bronze medal at the 1986 World Amateur Boxing Championships in Reno.

He died due to a heart attack two weeks after his 45th birthday on 17 December 2012.

== Olympic results ==
- Defeated John Larbi (Sweden) 19-5
- Defeated Zahir Raheem (United States) RSC 1 (2:15)
- Defeated Rachid Bouaita (France) 15-8
- Defeated Raimkul Malakhbekov (Russia) 14-14 (referee's decision)
- Lost to István Kovács (Hungary) 7-14
