= Anna Nyíri =

Hungarian swimmer

Anna Nyíry
Personal information
- Born: 25 May 1981 (age 43); Budapest, Hungary

Sport
- Sport: Swimming

Anna Nyíry (born 25 May 1981) is a Hungarian freestyle swimmer. She competed in two events at the 1996 Summer Olympics.
