= Myriam Segarra =

Puerto Rican softball player

Personal information
- Nationality: Puerto Rican
- Born: 7 January 1955 (age 71)

Sport
- Sport: Softball

Myriam Segarra (born 7 January 1955) is a Puerto Rican softball player. She competed in the women's tournament at the 1996 Summer Olympics.
