= Lourdes Baez =

Puerto Rican softball player

Personal information
- Nationality: Puerto Rican
- Born: 11 August 1969 (age 57)

Sport
- Sport: Softball

Lourdes Baez (born 11 August 1969) is a Puerto Rican softball player. She competed in the women's tournament at the 1996 Summer Olympics.
