= Bae Ki-woong =

South Korean boxer (born 1974)

Personal information
- Nationality: South Korean
- Born: 7 June 1974 (age 51)

Sport
- Sport: Boxing

Bae Ki-woong (born 7 June 1974) is a South Korean boxer. He competed in the men's bantamweight event at the 1996 Summer Olympics.
