= Vladimir Shmakov =

Uzbekistani judoka (born 1973)

Personal information
- Born: 8 February 1973 (age 53)
- Occupation: Judoka

Sport
- Sport: Judo
Medal record
Representing Uzbekistan
Men's Judo
Asian Games
Bronze medal – third place	1994 Hiroshima	-78 kg
Asian Championships
Gold medal – first place	1996 Ho Chi Minh City	-78 kg
Bronze medal – third place	1995 New Delhi	-78 kg

Profile at external databases
- JudoInside.com: 3182

Vladimir Shmakov (born 8 February 1973) is an Uzbekistani judoka. He won Asian gold medal in the half-middleweight division in 1996 Asian Judo Championships. He also competed in the men's half-middleweight event at the 1996 Summer Olympics.
