= Guram Biganishvili =

Georgian sailor

Personal information
- Nationality: Georgian
- Born: 19 May 1950 (age 75); Tbilisi, Georgia

Sport
- Sport: Sailing

Guram Biganishvili (born 19 May 1950) is a Georgian sailor. He competed at the 1992 Summer Olympics and the 1996 Summer Olympics.
