= Gastón García =

Argentine Olympic judoka (born 1968)

Personal information
- Full name: Darío Osvaldo Gastón García Aguilar
- Born: July 20, 1968 (age 57) Rosario, Santa Fe, Argentina
- Occupation: Judoka

Sport
- Sport: Judo
Medal record
Men's judo
Representing Argentina
Pan American Games
Gold medal – first place	1995 Mar del Plata	Light-middleweight
Bronze medal – third place	1991 Havana	Light-middleweight
Bronze medal – third place	1999 Winnipeg	Light-middleweight

Profile at external databases
- JudoInside.com: 1858

Darío Osvaldo Gastón García Aguilar (born July 20, 1968, in Rosario, Santa Fe) is a retired male judoka from Argentina. He claimed the gold medal in the Men's Light-Middleweight (– 78 kg) division at the 1995 Pan American Games in Mar de Plata. García represented his native country in four consecutive Summer Olympics, starting in 1988.
