= Mongolia at the 1996 Summer Olympics =

- IOC code: MGL
- NOC: Mongolian National Olympic Committee
- Website: www.olympic.mn (in Mongolian)

in Atlanta
- Competitors: 16 in 7 sports
- Flag bearer: Dolgorsürengiin Sumyaabazar
- Medals Ranked 71st: Gold 0 Silver 0 Bronze 1 Total 1

Summer Olympics appearances (overview)
- 1964; 1968; 1972; 1976; 1980; 1984; 1988; 1992; 1996; 2000; 2004; 2008; 2012; 2016; 2020; 2024

Mongolia competed at the 1996 Summer Olympics in Atlanta, United States.

== Medalists ==
=== Bronze ===
- Dorjpalamyn Narmandakh — Judo, Men's Extra Lightweight (60 kg)

== Results by event ==
=== Archery ===
In the sixth time they competed in archery at the Olympics, Mongolia again entered only one woman. She lost in the first round of elimination.

Women's Individual Competition:

- Jargal Otgon - round of 64, 44th place (0-1)

=== Athletics ===
Men's Discus Throw

- Dashdendev Makhashiri

- Qualification — 59.16m (→ did not advance)

Women's Marathon

- Erkhemsaikhan Davaajargal — 3:19.06 (→ 63rd place)

=== Boxing ===
Men's Bantamweight (– 54 kg)

- Davaatseren Jamgan

- First Round — Defeated Oscar Chongo (Zambia), 13-7
- Second Round — Defeated Ki-Woong Bae (South Korea), 11-10
- Quarter Finals — Lost to Raimkul Malakhbekov (Russia), 9-21

Men's Featherweight (– 57 kg)

- Naramchogt Lamgen

- First Round — Lost to Ulugbek Ibragimov (Uzbekistan), referee stopped contest in second round
