= Lyes Cherifi =

Algerian judoka

Personal information
- Nationality: Algerian
- Born: 4 March 1968 (age 57)

Sport
- Sport: Judo

Lyes Cherifi (born 4 March 1968) is an Algerian judoka. He competed in the men's half-middleweight event at the 1996 Summer Olympics.
