= Kaloyan Baev =

Bulgarian wrestler

Personal information
- Nationality: Bulgarian
- Born: 21 August 1972 (age 52); Varna, Bulgaria

Sport
- Sport: Wrestling

Kaloyan Baev (born 21 August 1972) is a Bulgarian wrestler. He competed at the 1992 Summer Olympics and the 1996 Summer Olympics.
