= Khurshed Khasanov =

Tajikistani boxer

Personal information
- Nationality: Tajikistani
- Born: 19 August 1973 (age 51)

Sport
- Sport: Boxing

Khurshed Khasanov (born 19 August 1973) is a Tajikistani boxer. He competed in the men's bantamweight event at the 1996 Summer Olympics.
