= Lisa Martínez (softball) =

Puerto Rican softball player

Personal information
- Nationality: Puerto Rican
- Born: 23 July 1964 (age 62)

Sport
- Sport: Softball

Lisa Martínez (born 23 July 1964) is a Puerto Rican softball player. She competed in the women's tournament at the 1996 Summer Olympics.
