= María González (softball) =

Puerto Rican softball player

Personal information
- Nationality: Puerto Rican
- Born: 29 December 1965 (age 60)

Sport
- Sport: Softball

María González (born 29 December 1965) is a Puerto Rican softball player. She competed in the women's tournament at the 1996 Summer Olympics.
