= Scott Bianco =

Canadian wrestler (born 1967)

Scott Bianco (born 9 November 1967 in Kamloops, British Columbia) is a Canadian former wrestler who competed in the 1996 Summer Olympics. He was a six time Canadian Senior Freestyle Champion winning 90 kg four times, 100 kg and 130 kg. A 1994 Commonwealth Gold Medal and 7th place in the world Championships were amongst his other achievements. During his wrestling career he first completed in the NAIA for Simon Fraser University and then later as a member of the Burnaby Mountain Wrestling Club.
