= Bayanmönkhiin Gantogtokh =

Mongolian wrestler

Personal information
- Nationality: Mongolian
- Born: 12 April 1972 (age 54)

Sport
- Sport: Mongolian wrestling
- Rank: State Garuda
Medal record
Representing Mongolia
Men's freestyle wrestling
Asian Championships
Silver medal – second place	1993 Ulan Bator	82 kg
Silver medal – second place	1997 Tehran	97 kg
Bronze medal – third place	1995 Manila	90 kg

Bayanmönkhiin Gantogtokh (born 12 April 1972) is a Mongolian wrestler who holds the national wrestling rank of State Garuda in traditional Mongolian wrestling. He also represented Mongolia in freestyle wrestling, competing the men's freestyle 90 kg at the 1996 Summer Olympics.

== World Championships Results ==
At the 1995 World Championships Bayanmönkhiin Gantogtokh lost to Rasoul Khadem of Iran of the elimination rounds. Nevertheless, Gantogtokh has a chance of winning a medal though it's not gold or silver. Gantogtokh controversially lost the Bronze Medal match against 1993 World and reining multiple U.S. Open Champion Melvin Douglas of USA 1-1 (independent experts gave the score of 3-1 in favor of the Mongolian wrestler). He got two quality takedowns, but the referees completely ignored the one takedown and didn't count it. At the same time, Melvin Douglas could do nothing, only pushing the Mongolian off the mat once. This is confirmed by the video recording.

== Personal life ==
Gantogtokh is the son of Khorloogiin Bayanmönkh, a State Grand Champion who won the Naadam wrestling tournament 10 times and won a silver medal at the 1972 Summer Olympics. Gantogtokh's daughter Khandsuren Gantogtokh is a professional volleyball player.

== Mongolian wrestling career record ==
Bayanmönkhiin Gantogtokh
Year	Level	Participants	Rank	Wins	Earned title	Notes
2006	State	1024	State Garuda	5	Urnun Delgerekh	
2005	State	512	State Garuda	6	Unen Zorigt	
2004	State	512	State Garuda	8	Tod Sonin	
2004	Title post-awarded/revoked	4	State Elephant		State Garuda	By a Presidential Decree, he was awarded the title of State Garid based on his performance in the 2000 National Naadam.
2003	State	512	State Elephant	4		
2002	State	512	State Elephant	8	Buurshgui Khuchit	
2001	State	1024	State Elephant	6	Uran Barildaant	
2000	State	512	State Elephant	8		
1999	State	512	State Elephant	5	Hurts Shalamgai	
1998	State	512	State Elephant	5	Saruul Saijrakh	
1997	State	512	State Elephant	4		
1996	State	512	State Elephant	0		
1995	State	512	State Elephant	6	Ulemj Badrakh	
1994	State	768	Elephant of Sum	7	State Elephant	
State Naadam Winner Won at least 5 rounds in State Naadam Aimag/Sum Naadam Promotion
