= Martine de Souza =

Mauritian badminton player (born 1973)

Personal information
- Nationality: Mauritian
- Born: 26 July 1973 (age 52)

Sport
- Sport: Badminton
Medal record
Women's badminton
Representing Mauritius
African Championships
Silver medal – second place	1994 Mauritius	Women's singles

Martine Hennequin (née de Souza, born 26 July 1973) is a Mauritian badminton player. She competed in women's singles and women's doubles at the 1992 Summer Olympics in Barcelona, and in three events at the 1996 Summer Olympics in Atlanta. She has won gold medals in three Indian Ocean Island Games editions.
