= Tseyen-Oidovyn Davaatseren =

Mongolian boxer (born 1971)

Personal information
- Nationality: Mongolian
- Born: 19 March 1971 (age 54)
- Height: 170 cm (5 ft 7 in)
- Weight: 54 kg (119 lb)

Sport
- Sport: Boxing

Tseyen-Oidovyn Davaatseren (born 19 March 1971) is a Mongolian former boxer. He competed in the men's bantamweight event at the 1996 Summer Olympics.
