= Jozef Lohyňa =

Slovak wrestler (born 1963)

Medal record

Representing Czechoslovakia

Men's freestyle wrestling

Olympic Games
Bronze medal – third place	1988 Seoul	82 kg

Jozef Lohyňa (born 1963) is a Slovak wrestler. He was born in Zlaté Moravce. He won an Olympic bronze medal in Freestyle wrestling in 1988 and a gold medal at the 1990 World Wrestling Championships in Tokyo, competing for Czechoslovakia. He represented Czechoslovakia at the 1992 Olympics, and competed for Slovakia at the 1996 Olympics.
