= Kayode Akinsanya =

Nigerian badminton player (born 1976)

Personal information
- Nationality: Nigeria
- Born: 9 June 1976 (age 49)

Sport
- Sport: Badminton

Kayode Akinsanya(born 9 June 1976) is a Nigerian badminton player. He competed in the 1996 Summer Olympics.
