= Péter Bacsa =

Hungarian wrestler

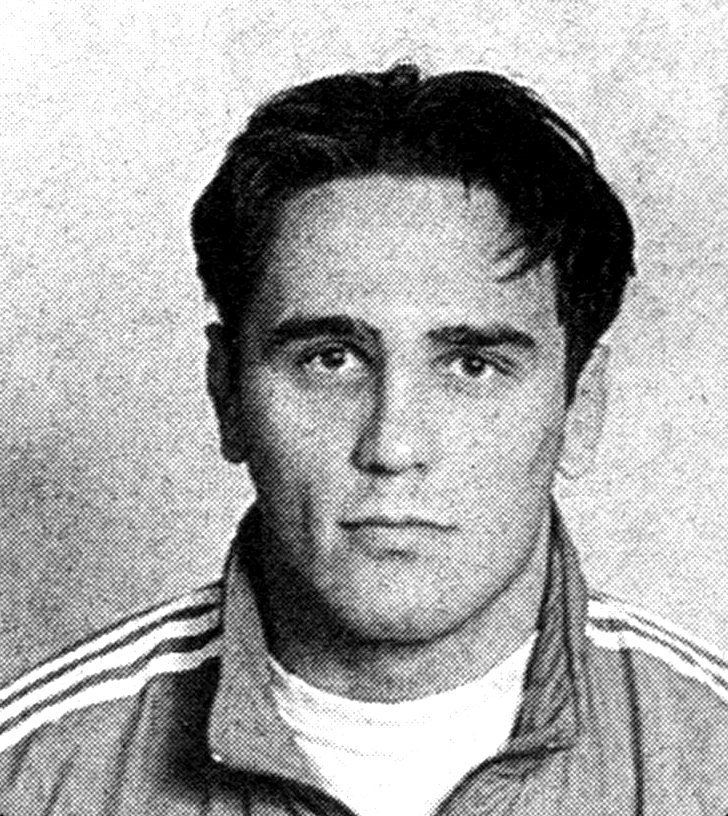
Péter Bacsa

Péter Bacsa (born 21 November 1970, in Dorog) is a Hungarian former wrestler who competed in the 1996 Summer Olympics.
