= Kim Ik-hee =

South Korean wrestler (born 1971)

Kim Ik-Hee (born 7 December 1971) is a Korean former wrestler who competed in the 1996 Summer Olympics.
