= Victor Kodei =

Nigerian wrestler (born 1965)

Personal information
- Nationality: Nigerian
- Born: 11 November 1965 (age 60)

Sport
- Sport: Wrestling

Victor Kodei Ayaokpo (born 11 November 1965) is a Nigerian wrestler. He competed at the 1988 Summer Olympics, the 1996 Summer Olympics and the 2000 Summer Olympics.
