= 1997 Beach Volleyball World Championships =

The 1997 Beach Volleyball World Championships, were held from September 10 to September 13, 1997, in Los Angeles, California (United States). It was the first official edition of this event, after 10 unofficial championships between 1987 and 1996.

== Men's competition ==
=== Final ranking (top sixteen) ===
- A total number of 56 participating couples

| Rank | Name Athletes | Seed |
|---|---|---|
| 1st place, gold medalist(s) | Rogério Ferreira and Guilherme Marques (BRA) | 9 |
| 2nd place, silver medalist(s) | Canyon Ceman and Mike Whitmarsh (USA) | 3 |
| 3rd place, bronze medalist(s) | Dain Blanton and Kent Steffes (USA) | 2 |
| 3rd place, bronze medalist(s) | Paulão Moreira and Paulo Emílio Silva (BRA) | 4 |
| 5. | Eduardo Bacil and José Loiola (BRA) | 1 |
| 5. | Adam Johnson and Karch Kiraly (USA) | 5 |
| 5. | Zé Marco de Melo and Emanuel Rego (BRA) | 6 |
| 5. | Ian Clark and Troy Tanner (USA) | 10 |
| 9. | Mike Dodd and Rob Heidger (USA) | 7 |
| 9. | John Child and Mark Heese (CAN) | 11 |
| 9. | Eric Fonoimoana and Brian Lewis (USA) | 14 |
| 9. | Martin Laciga and Paul Laciga (SUI) | 16 |
| 9. | Julien Prosser and Lee Zahner (AUS) | 18 |
| 9. | Roberto Lopes and Franco Neto (BRA) | 20 |
| 9. | Dax Holdren and Todd Rogers (USA) | 21 |
| 9. | Duda Macedo and Fred Souza (BRA) | 25 |

== Women's competition ==
- A total number of 45 participating couples

=== Final ranking (top sixteen) ===
| Rank | Name Athletes | Seed |
|---|---|---|
| 1st place, gold medalist(s) | Sandra Pires and Jackie Silva (BRA) | 3 |
| 2nd place, silver medalist(s) | Lisa Arce and Holly McPeak (USA) | 1 |
| 3rd place, bronze medalist(s) | Shelda Bede and Adriana Behar (BRA) | 2 |
| 3rd place, bronze medalist(s) | Karolyn Kirby and Nancy Reno (USA) | 12 |
| 5. | Mônica Rodrigues and Adriana Samuel (BRA) | 4 |
| 5. | Barbra Fontana and Linda Hanley (USA) | 7 |
| 5. | Liz Masakayan and Elaine Youngs (USA) | 8 |
| 5. | Siomara de Souza and Magda Lima (BRA) | 11 |
| 9. | Natalie Cook and Kerri Pottharst (AUS) | 5 |
| 9. | Maike Friedrichsen and Danja Müsch (GER) | 6 |
| 9. | Adriana Bento and Ana Richa (BRA) | 9 |
| 9. | Karrie Poppinga and Angela Rock (USA) | 10 |
| 9. | Rebekka Kadijk and Debora Schoon-Kadijk (NED) | 13 |
| 9. | Krista Blomquist and Christine Podraza (USA) | 14 |
| 9. | Laura Bruschini and Annamaria Solazzi (ITA) | 16 |
| 9. | Eva Celbová and Sona Novaková (CZE) | 18 |
