= 1999 Beach Volleyball World Championships =

- Dates: 19 July – 24 July

These page shows the results of the II Beach Volleyball World Championships, held from 19 July to 24 July 1999 in Marseille, France. It was the second official edition of this event, after ten unofficial championships (1987–1996) all held in Rio de Janeiro, and the first to be organized in Europe. The event, organized every two years and with $600,000 in total prize money, was held in a special facility for 5,000 spectators. At the end of the competition the spectators totalled nearly 50,000.

== Men's competition ==
=== Final ranking (top twelve) ===
- A total number of 87 participating couples

Rank	Name Athletes	Seed
1st place, gold medalist(s)	José Loiola and Emanuel Rego (BRA)	2
2nd place, silver medalist(s)	Martin Laciga and Paul Laciga (SUI)	6
3rd place, bronze medalist(s)	Rogério Ferreira and Guilherme Marques (BRA)	3
4.	Javier Bosma and Fabio Diez (ESP)	8
5.	Adam Johnson and Karch Kiraly (USA)	5
5.	Julien Prosser and Lee Zahner (AUS)	15
7.	Rob Heidger and Kevin Wong (USA)	13
7.	Carl Henkel and Sinjin Smith (USA)	16
9.	John Child and Mark Heese (CAN)	4
9.	Dain Blanton and Eric Fonoimoana (USA)	19
9.	Mariano Baracetti and José Salema (ARG)	23
9.	Maurizio Pimponi and Andrea Raffaelli (ITA)	31

== Women's competition ==
- A total number of 71 participating couples

=== Final ranking (top twelve) ===
Rank	Name Athletes	Seed
1st place, gold medalist(s)	Shelda Bede and Adriana Behar (BRA)	1
2nd place, silver medalist(s)	Annett Davis and Jenny Johnson Jordan (USA)	8
3rd place, bronze medalist(s)	Liz Masakayan and Elaine Youngs (USA)	13
4.	Sandra Pires and Adriana Samuel (BRA)	13
5.	Yukiko Takahashi and Mika Teru Saiki (JPN)	15
5.	Ulrike Schmidt and Gudi Staub (GER)	16
7.	Pauline Manser and Kerri Pottharst (AUS)	2
7.	Maike Friedrichsen and Danja Müsch (GER)	10
9.	Rebekka Kadijk and Debora Schoon-Kadijk (NED)	6
9.	Angela Clarke and Natalie Cook (AUS)	11
9.	Adriana Bento and Monica Paludo (BRA)	21
9.	Audrey Cooper and Amanda Glover (GBR)	29
