= California Beach Volleyball Association =

Association of Beach Volleyball

The California Beach Volleyball Association, commonly known by the acronym CBVA, was the first governing body for beach volleyball. Since its founding in 1962, CBVA has coordinated local beach volleyball tournaments for players of all skill levels. In 2017, CBVA hosted nearly 1,000 tournaments at 23 beaches in 11 skill or age divisions. There are approximately 8,000 members from California and beyond.

== History ==
CBVA tournament organizers met in 1962 to coordinate tournament schedules and establish the rules of the game. The goal of the CBVA was to unite the local beach volleyball communities and to coordinate local tournament schedules.

== Ratings ==
Players are categorized into distinct tiers based on their competitive skill level and tournament performance. From lowest to highest, ratings are Unrated, B, A, AA, and AAA . Players acquire these ratings by achieving high finishes—typically first, second, or third place, depending on the total number of participating teams—in sanctioned CBVA events. Once earned, a letter rating remains active for the remainder of the calendar year and the entirety of the following season. If a player fails to re-earn their rating within this timeframe, it degrades by one tier each subsequent January 1st until the player returns to Unrated status. Players may compete in any division at or above their current classification, but are prohibited from entering divisions below it.

== Hall of Fame ==
The CBVA Beach Volleyball Hall of Fame is a collaboration between CBVA and the Hermosa Beach Historical Society. To be eligible for the Hall of Fame, individuals must either be a top ranked volleyball player who has maintained a high degree of excellence and superior play over a significant period of time and demonstrated significant CBVA participation or someone who has devoted a major part of their life to the sport of beach volleyball and made positive and meaningful contributions. For players, five years must have passed since playing at their highest competitive level (for players). The Hall of Fame Committee develop a list of player nominees and selects at least one male and one female.

CBVA Beach Volleyball Hall of Fame Inductees
Year	Inductees
2025	Jim Arico, Phil Dalhausser & April Ross
2024	Dax Holdren, Phil Stutzel & Kerri Walsh
2023	Nicole Branagh, Jake Gibb, Sam Laganà & Stein Metzger
2022	Annett Davis, Jon Lee & Sean Rosenthal
2021	No Inductees
2020	No Inductees
2019	Jennifer Kessy, Todd Rogers & Bob Van Wagner
2018	Jenny Johnson, Mike Lambert & Sean Scott
2017	Gail Castro, Rose Duncan, Misty May, Team Smith & Stoklos, Paul Sunderland & John Vallely
2016	Dain Blanton, John Featherstone, Team Hovland & Dodd, Elaine Youngs & Fred Zuelich
2015	Lisa Arce, Nancy Cohen, Jon Hastings & Ricci Luyties
2014	Bob Clem, Barbra Fontana & José Loiola
2013	Jack Adriance, Patty Dodd, Eric Fonoimoana & Buzz Swarts
2012	Scott Ayakatubby, Adam Johnson & Janice Opalinski
2011	Art Couvillon, John Hanley, Brian Lewis & Holly McPeak
2010	Kevin Cleary, Angela Rock & Mike Whitmarsh
2009	Gary Hooper, Gary Martin, Liz Masakayan & Pat Powers
2008	Tom Chamales, Wilt Chamberlain, Linda Chisholm, Brent Frohoff & Jackie Silva
2007	Karch Kiraly
2006	Dennis Hare, Karolyn Kirby & Nancy Reno
2005	Steve Obradovich, Manny Saenz & Denny Smith
2004	Linda Robertson & Kent Steffes
2003	Andy Fishburn & Dane Selznick
2002	Sinjin Smith
2001	Henry Bergman & Johnette Latreille
2000	Mike Dodd & Tim Hovland
1999	Robi Hutas, ZoAnn McFarland & Randy Stoklos
1998	Barbara May, Al Scates & Ernie Suwara
1997	Kathy Hanley, Greg Lee, Larry Rundle & Charlie Saikley
1996	Butch May, Mary Jo Peppler, Jon Stevenson & Robert Vogelsang
1995	Mike Bright, Eileen Clancy & Ron Lang
1994	Bobby Barber, Matt Gage, Nina Matthies & Jim Menges
1993	Jean Brunicardi, Keith Erickson, Kirk Kilgour, Chris Marlowe, Miki McFadden & Sharky Zartman
1992	Mike Cook, Kathy Gregory, Bernie Holtzman, Ed Montan, Mike O'Hara, Gene Popko, Gene Selznick, George Stepanof & Ron Von Hagen

== Board of directors ==
CBVA's board of directors is largely made up of former professional beach volleyball players:

- Chris Brown: president and tournament director at Hermosa Beach.
- JP Saikley: tournament director at Manhattan Beach Pier
- Sinjin Smith: tournament director Long Beach;
- Dane Selznick: tournament director at Santa Monica North
- Steve Upp: tournament director at Ocean Beach & Mission Beach in San Diego
- Therese Butler: tournament director at Huntington Beach
- Lucas Bol: tournament director at Main Beach, Santa Cruz
