= Volleyball jargon =

This is a list of the more common English volleyball jargon terms:

== Common terms ==
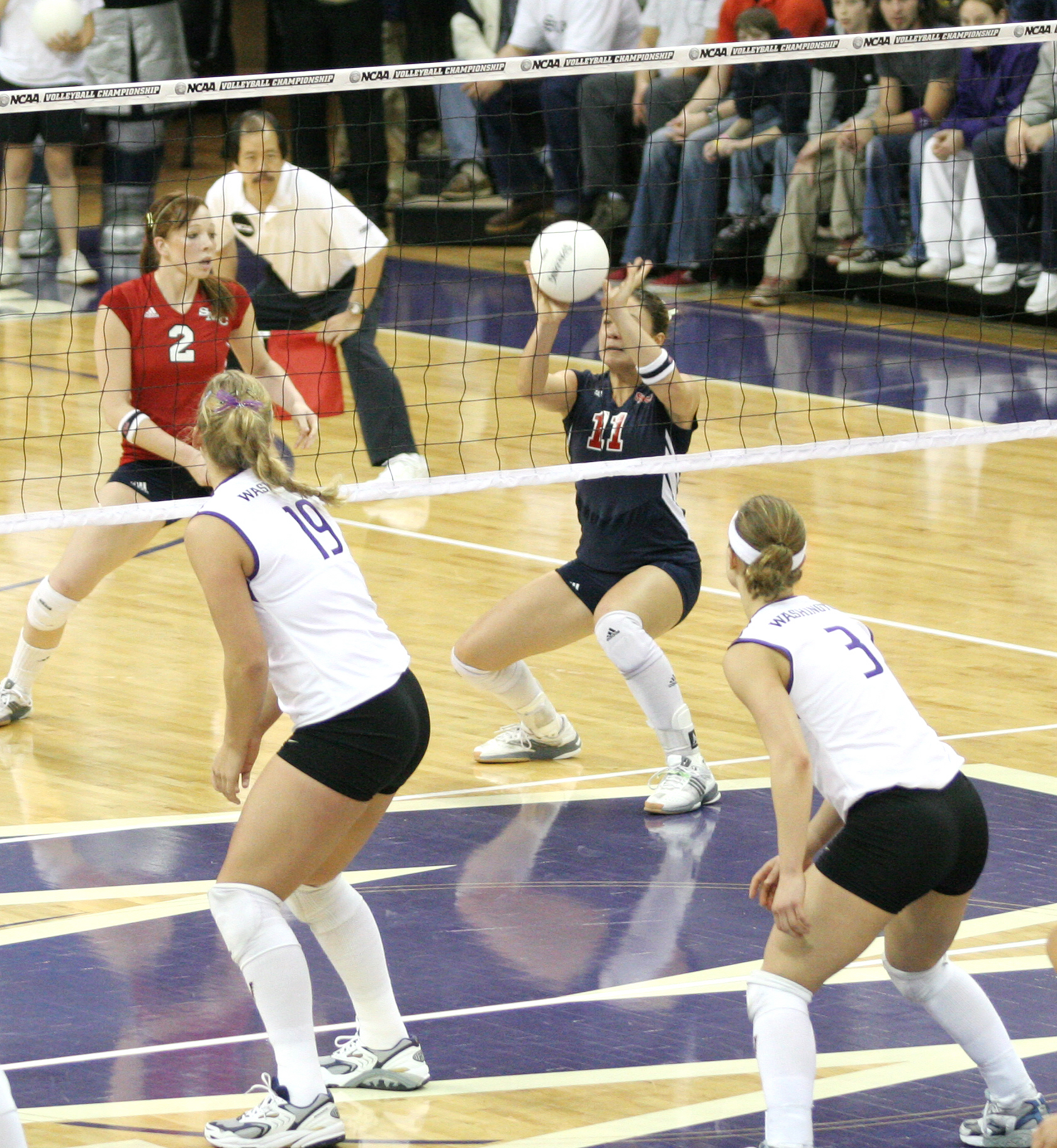
An overhand dig

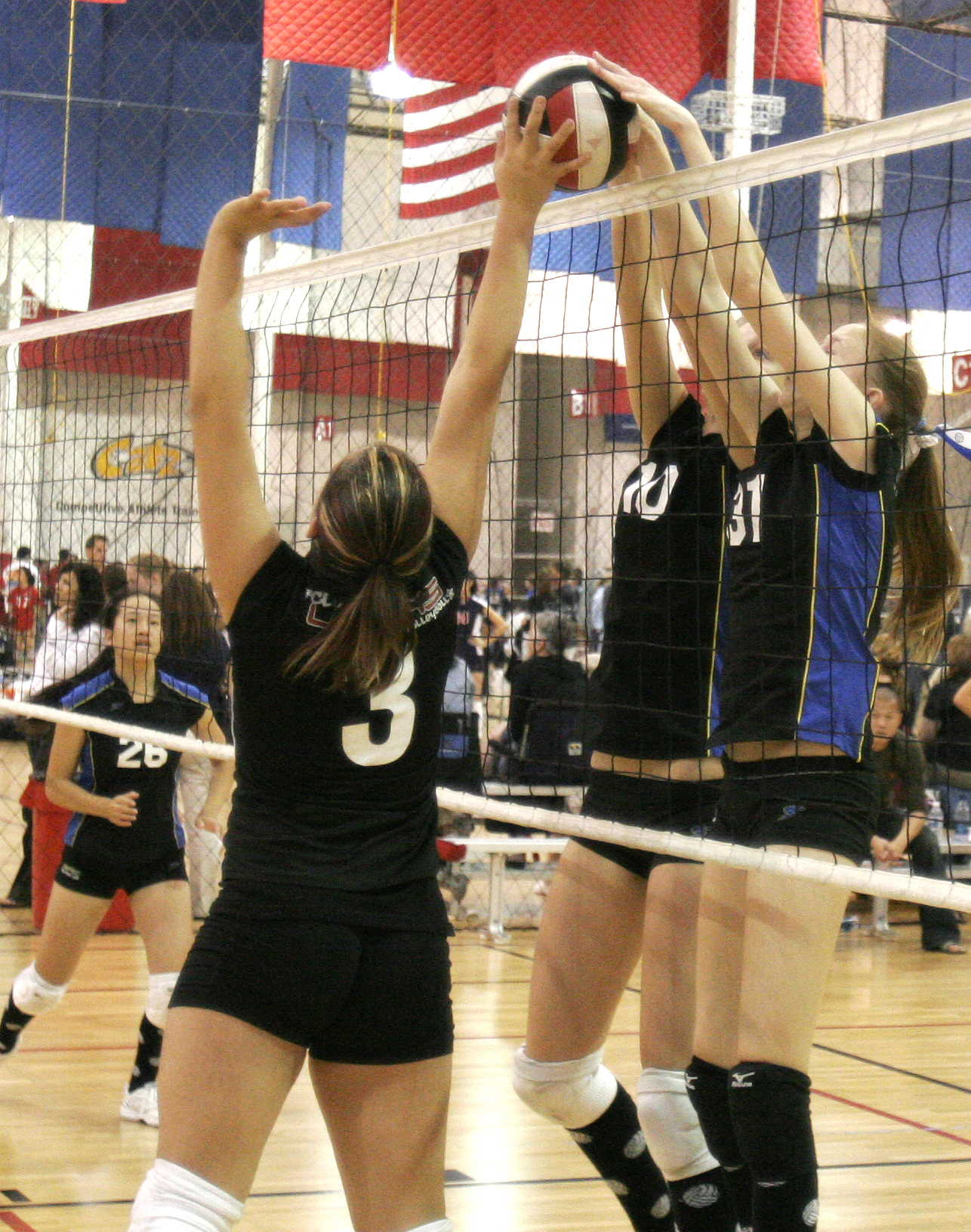
A joust

- Ace: A serve which lands in the opponent's court without being touched, or is touched but unable to be kept in play by one or more receiving team players directly resulting in a point scored for the serving team.
- Assist: Usually the second of a team's three contacts, an assist is awarded for any set ball that results in a kill on the ensuing attack
- Attack: Usually the third of a team's three contacts, an attack is any attempt by the offense to score a point against the defense (this does not include free balls or over-passes)
- Breakpoint: A point scored on the team's own serve. In the scoring system prior to 1999, these were the only scored points (except for sanction points). Even in the present scoring system, these are the points that really count, as the side outs cancel each other
- Cross-court shot: An individual attack directed at an angle from one end of the offensive team's side of the net to the opposite sideline of the defensive team's court
- Cut shot or cutty: attack with an extreme angle (nearly parallel to the net)
- Dig: A defensive contact following an opponent's attack resulting in a playable ball. Arms can be in a platform position or in an overhead position like a set. The player digs the ball when it is coming at a downward trajectory
- Double contact or Double touch: A fault in which a player contacts the ball with two body parts consecutively. A double is commonly called on a setter when making a faulty touch on the ball resulting in a quick succession of touches. However, multiple leagues such as the women's side of the NCAA have done away with this judgment call.
- D.S.: DS, or "defensive specialist," is a player skilled at back-row defense. His specialties include passing and diving. Unlike Libero, he can switch positions with anyone on the court.
- Dump: A surprise attack usually executed by a front row setter to catch the defense off guard; many times executed with the left hand, sometimes with the right, aimed at the donut or area 4 on the court
- Five-One: Six-player offensive system where a single designated setter sets regardless of court position. The player is responsible for the second touch on every reception of serve, and ideally every defensive play
- Four Step Approach: The sequence of steps a hitter takes to meet a ball. Consisting of four steps. For right-handed hitters the sequence is: right, left, right, left. For Left-handed hitters: left, right, left, right
- Free ball: A ball that is passed over the net because an attack wasn't possible, thus making it an easy ball to receive and allowing the defensive team to run a full in system offences.
- Free ball kill: A celebratory term when an easy pass is sent over the net and scores a point
- Four-Two: Six player offense where there are two designated setters and the front row setter sets
- Goofy: When a player jumps with wrong foot first (while attacking) (commonly known as goofy footed)
- Illegal Block(er): When a back row player attempts to block an opponent's offensive action by making contact with the ball above the plane of the net
- Joust: when the ball is falling directly on top of the net, two opposing players jump and push against the ball, trying to push it onto the other's side
- Let: a serve in which the ball hits the net on the side of the court served on, but still makes it over the net and onto the opposing side's floor, resulting in a point. This used to be a service error prior to 2001. Also, any rally that results in a re-play without awarding any points (e.g. when two faults happen at the same time)
- Kill: successful, legal, point-scoring play. It can be from a spike attack, tip or dump
- Mis-hit: A hit in which a player swings but does not contact the ball as intended, giving it a different speed, direction, and spin than the player intended
- On-Two: When the player making the second contact on the ball decides to play the ball over the net instead of setting up their teammate. Most often used in court volleyball by the setter, it is often called a "setter dump" or a "turn and burn", but on the beach it is colloquially referred to as an "on-two"
- One-Two-Two Coverage: Attack coverage system where one player covers directly under the block, two players cover 1–3 meters away, and two players cover 4–5 meters away
- Opposite hitter: The player which plays in the rotation opposite the setter and usually attacks from the right side
- Over pass: An error forced by a passer, causing the ball to go back over the net rather than to a passing target, giving the opposite side a chance to score.
- Pancake: When a player digs the ball by extending a hand flat on the floor, palm facing down, letting the ball bounce off the back of the hand, often used as a last second desperation to prevent the ball from hitting the floor giving the attacking team a point.
- Pepper: A drill in which players hit a ball back and forth in a pass, set, spike, pass, set, spike, etc. pattern without a net
- Perimeter defense: A defensive formation of back row players where players set up along the edges of the court to dig. Middle back is deep in the center and right while left-back shift back and towards the sidelines. This formation leaves a hole in the center of the court for the opposing team to score in
- Rally scoring: The sport's current scoring system, in which each rally ends with a point being scored.
- Roll Shot: An offensive play that is slightly similar to a hit or spike. Unlike a hit or spike, rolls shots are performed by making contact underneath the ball and moving your arm in an upwards motion rather than making contact on top of the ball and swinging your arm downwards in a fast motion. A roll shot is not a fast offensive hit aimed away from the net, nor a tip aimed near the net, but it is meant to go high enough to avoid a block, but not too far back. Roll shots are generally aimed around 10–15 feet away from the net or into deep corners
- Rotation Defense: A defensive formation of back row players where players "rotate" to cover a deep line shot. This formation closes the hole in the center of the court, but leaves space over the block in middle back for opposing attackers
- Seam: When serving, the area between passers on serve receive; when attacking, the area between blockers or back row defenders
- Set: The setter, located in the center or right front, hits the ball high above the net so that a spiker can spike it across. The setter always takes the second hit, if possible
- Shank: When a player unintentionally passes a ball in a wild manner, rendering it unplayable to their teammates
- Shot: An offensive play in which a set ball, rather than being spiked hard, is directed to an open area of the court. This is a play requiring less power and more precision to be done accurately.
- Side out: When a team that served the ball loses the rally, it results in a "sideout," which means the serving opportunity shifts to the opposing team. Previously, until the 1990s, a team could only score a point on their serve. So, sideout at that mean gaining the right to serve
- Six-Two: Six player offense where there are two designated setters and the back row setter sets. Called six-two because there are two setters and six other players (two outsides, two middle hitters, and two right-side hitters)
- Six-back: Defensive system where the player in "six" (the middle position in the back-court) plays deep in the court covering attacks through the seam in the block, attacks over top of the block, and attacks that go high off the block. With certain blocking schemes, the player in "six" might also be responsible for deep line roll shots
- Six-up: Defensive system where the player in "six" (the middle position in the back-court) plays up behind the block with the responsibility of defending against a tip attack
- Six-zero: Six player offense where there are no designated positions. Instead, the designated setter is just the player in position 3 (or sometimes 2)
- Spike (a.k.a. Hit): When an offensive player attacks the ball with a one-arm motion done over the head, attempting to get a kill
- Spatch: When a player contacts the ball incorrectly during a hit causing the ball to propel unlike how the hitter intended
- Strong side: The left side of the court, so called because it is usually the easier side for right-handed players to attack from. Also referred to as the "on-hand" side
- "The Gap" or "push": A spike between area two and area three that the middle hits. It's always the same distance from the setter no matter where the setter is positioned on the set
- The "W": A common serve receive formation at lower levels where 5 players prepare to pass with 1 designated setter. So named because from above, the 5 passers are assembled on the five points of a "W". Alternatively, possibly a Serve Screening formation by the serving team, also named for resembling a W
- Three across: A common passing formation where three passers start in a line across the back row to receive a serve
- Three Step Approach: The sequence of steps a hitter takes to meet a ball. Consisting of three steps. For right-handed hitters the sequence is: left, right, left. For Left-handed hitters: right, left, right
- Tool: when an attacker manages to force the ball off a blocker, causing the ball to go out of bounds giving the attacker the kill. This is often done by hitting the ball off "high hands" causing the ball to go out the back of the court, or off the side of a blocker's arms causing the ball to go out the side lines.
- Whiff: When a hitter swings for the ball in attempt to attack but instead misses the contact entirely.
- Two-Three Coverage: Attack coverage system where two players cover 1–2 meters away from the block, and three players cover 2–4 meters away
- Weak Side: The right side of the court, so called because it is generally easier for right-handed players to attack from the left ("strong") side. Also known as the "off-hand" side
- Swing Blocking: A blocking technique that allows a blocker to use their arms for added momentum to block higher with a full approach, this requires the blocker to turn their body parallel with the net and requires more advanced footwork than that of stagnant blocking or shuffle blocking.
- Shuffle Blocking: a blocking technique in which a blocker keeps their shoulders square to the net and "shuffles" or side steps across the net to reach the attacker. unlike the swing block, the shuffle block footwork is simple but reduces the max height a blocker can reach.

== Types of sets ==
There is no absolute standard for naming sets, so there can be several different names for any one type of set.

- A : A back row set aimed at the left side quarter of the court [A|B||C|D]. Also could be a quick set to the middle, or a back-one
- B : A back row set aimed to the left side middle quarter of the court [A|B||C|D]
- Back-Two: A ball set relatively high and to the middle or to the right side hitter, directly behind the setter
- Back-One: A ball set relatively low (or quick) to the middle hitter or to the right side hitter, directly behind the setter
- Bick : Similar to the "Pipe", but set very low (the name comes from Back quick)
- C : A back row set aimed to the right side middle quarter of the court [A|B||C|D]
- Chaos: An offense in which the middle runs a one, the outside comes for a two off the middle's shoulder, and the weak side runs around the back to hit an outside 3
- Cross (X) : A play in which the middle hitter jumps for a one, and the weak-side hitter, having moved to the middle of the court, takes an approach for a two at the same location
- D : A back row set aimed at the right side quarter of the court [A|B||C|D]
- Fade or pop: A play in which the middle hitter approaches to a hit a one ball, but instead of jumping straight up, they jump to their left. This is used to get around the opponent's block, who expects the attacker to jump normally for the one ball
- Five : Same as a four set, but to the weak side or opposite hitter. Also, a middle set higher than a two
- Four or Back or Eleven : A high set to the strong side or outside hitter
- Go : A set to the outside hitter, higher than a shoot but lower and faster than a hut
- Hut or Loop : A lower set to the outsider hitter. Higher than a shoot
- Jones : A variation of "Chaos" where the middle runs a one, the outside comes for a "back 2," and the weakside comes around to hit an "outside 3." The setter may choose to set the ball to any of the three hitting options. This play is designed so that the setter is able to accommodate the set according to where the block is positioned
- Middle-finger Ball : When the libero takes an approach and jumps as if to hit a one ball, making as much noise as possible to distract the other team. This will hopefully cause blockers to jump with the libero, despite there being no threat of attack. Usually used by a team winning by a significant margin
- One or Quick or Fifty-One : A type of middle hit when the middle jumps before the setter sets, with the ball being set directly to the middle hitter's hand
- Pipe : A back row set aimed at the middle of the court between a B and a C-ball [A|B|^|C|D]
- Pump-one: A play in which the middle hitter approaches to hit a one ball, but pauses at the last minute before the jump. The setter sets the ball slightly higher to account for the delay in approach. This is used to try and get the opponent middle miss time their block. Ideally, the opponent blocker would "bite" with the one ball and jump before the hitter jumps. If done well, this gives the attacking middle an attack with no blocker
- Pump-fade: A combination of a "pump-one" and a "fade". The attacking middle hitter pretends to jump for a one ball, but pauses, then hits a slightly higher ball off their left shoulder
- Shaft : A deep pipe set, generally set high
- Shocker: An attack in which the middle runs a one, the opposite comes for a two off the middle's shoulder, and the outside runs or slides around to hit a back-two
- Shoot : A variation on the quick set except instead of setting the ball to the middle the ball is set to the outside hitter
- Slide: A variation on the "back-one" where the ball is pushed all the way out to the antenna for the right-side attacker.
- Step or Slide : An attack where the hitter fakes a quick-set (one) approach with their first step and subsequently chases the ball behind the setter and parallel to the net, jumps off one foot, and hits the ball close to the antenna on the weak side
- Tandem, Stack, or Piggy-back : Similar to the "cross" but the outside hitter hits the two ball
- Ten : A ball set for a back row attack
- Three or Thirty-Three : A quick lower set to the outside
- Thirty-Two: An attack where the hitter fakes a quick-set (one) approach with their first step and subsequently chases the ball in front of the setter and parallel to the net, jumps off one foot, and hits the ball in the outside 3 position. Generally used as adapted version of the Slide for left-handed hitters
- Two or Meter : A ball set to the middle hitter at approximately two feet above the top of the net. Also, a "back two" is the same set set behind the setter
- Thirty-One or Inside Shoot : A play in which the middle hitter runs a one ball about halfway in between the middle and outside
- Thirty Stack : A play in which the middle hitter runs a thirty-one and the outside hitter runs a thirty-two

While there is no absolute standard, the most common set naming system is a two number system where the first number corresponds to a zone on the net, and the second number corresponds to the height of the set at its apex above the top of the net in feet. Zones are named 1 through 9 from left to right along the net with the setter occupying Zone 6; and the most common set heights are 1, 2, 3, 5, and 10 (represented by a 0 in the notation). For example, a 10 set is a high ball to the left side, a 53 is a 3 foot high set to the middle of the court (in front of the setter), and a 61 is a 1 foot high set right behind the setter.

== Methods of contacting the ball ==
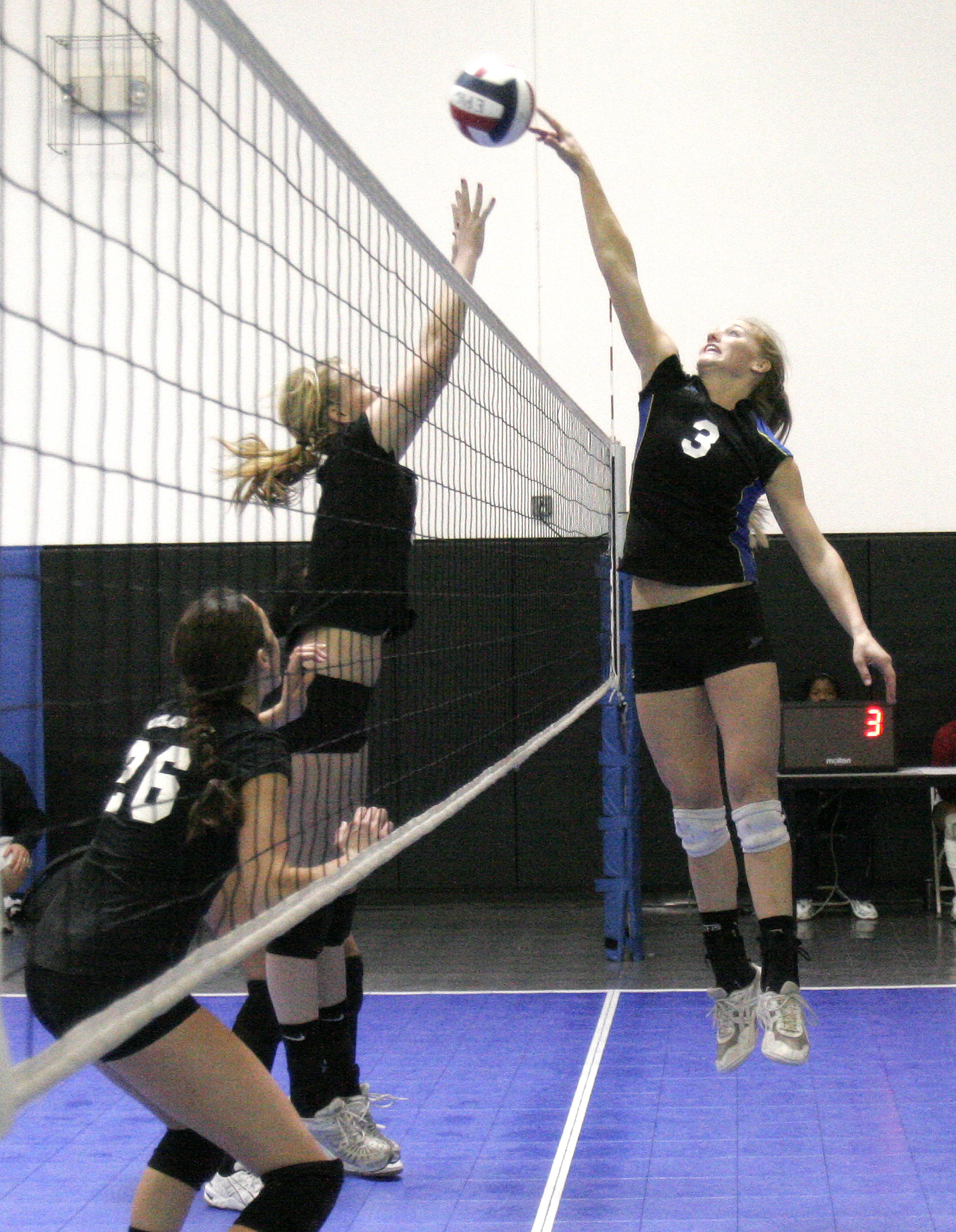
A player "tips" the ball over.

- Beach dig : A dig made using both hands and fingers to surround the ball, squeeze and actually slightly lift the ball. Allowed when defending against a hard hit on the beach
- Bump : Similar in motion to a pass, but used to set a ball for an attack
- Chicken wing : When a defending player is forced to react very quickly to a ball coming at their upper torso, the player may lift a bent arm in the shape of a chicken wing to dig the ball
- Chop Shot, Cut-shot, or Cutty : A type of attack usually executed on the beach, instead of contacting behind the ball the player turns their hand sideways and chops the side of the ball, creating side spin and a sharp sideways trajectory along the net. Most easily done with the right hand on the right side, and the left hand on the left side
- Cobra : With the fingers extended straight and stiff, the ball is poked with the fingertips
- Crepe : When a player digs the ball by extending their foot flat on the floor, letting the ball bounce off the top of the foot. Also called a waffle
- Dinosaur-Dig : When one attempts to block a ball but it falls down between them and the net, so they bring their arms down in front of them like a T-Rex and play the ball up with the backs of their wrists
- Dump: When on second contact the ball is purposely returned over the net instead of set to a hitter, which may result in a kill when the defense is unaware. Usually enacted by the setter
- Flipper : A reaching contact made with the outstretched back of the hand in a flipping motion. Popularized by beach player Andy Fishburn
- Gator : A defensive digging technique used on the beach in the defense of a hard hit ball. The hands are formed into the shape of 2 gator jaws. The maneuver involves digging the ball with the bottom hand and then directing it with the upper hand
- J-Stroke : an emergency play made either running or diving, often with one hand, where a player has to reach well in front of themself to contact the ball and follow through in a 'J' motion in order to send the ball back over their head
- Jay-pass : a forearm or overhead pass that places the setter in a position to only be able to set the passer who initiated the pass. Generally passed low to the ground and immediately in front of the passer
- Kong : A one-handed block, usually because the blocker is late. Initially popularized by Randy Stoklos
- Pancake : When a player digs the ball by extending a hand flat on the floor, palm facing down, letting the ball bounce off the back of the hand
- Pokey : A ball contacted with the knuckles especially on the beach
- Roll Shot : An attacker hits the set softly putting extreme topspin on the ball so that it will clear the block and drop quickly and directly over the block
- Sprawl : A type of dig in which the player does not dive forward, but rather places their hands on the ground and pushes their body forward and down. Similar to diving for a ball, but not actually leaving the ground
- Sky ball : An underhand serve in which the ball is shot unusually high into the air above the opposing team's court in the attempt to confuse the receiver
- Tomahawk: A defensive shot in beach volleyball made by putting the hands together and making contact with the volleyball overhead creating a platform with the bottom of the arms and side of hands, palms and knuckles together.
- Tip : A softer or off-speed finesse attack, usually committed with more of the fingers and fingertips than the whole hand as used in an attack
- Wipe or Swipe : When one player pushes the ball against the opponents block and physically wipes the ball out of bounds. Similar to a tool
- Steino : A 3 Knuckle pokey shot in beach volleyball made famous by AVP Pro and USA Olympian Stein Metzger. Metzger gives credit to the introduction of the shot on the AVP Pro tour to Eduardo Jorge "Anjinho" Bacil Filho, better known as Anjinho Bacil. In volleyball a way that you can get a point by using these methods is to place the ball where it is very hard for the other players to get to or to where they are unable to get to the ball

== Types of service motions ==
- Hybrid : A term describing serves in which the ball is hit with a spin not reflected in the toss, usually jumping. For example, a toss with topspin struck in a manner to induce float, or no spin, on the ball. This is often used in combination with another serve of the same toss, but a different spin. For example, a "jump topspin" and a "hybrid" serve are often paired at high levels to deceive passers
- Jump float : A serve in which the player strikes the ball while jumping with no spin, or "float". This creates an erratic, difficult-to-read serve. Comparable to a knuckleball in baseball. The primary advantage to the jump float is to contact the ball at a high enough point that the vector of the ball is parallel with the top of the net, or above to create a downward trajectory.
- Jump serve or jump topspin : A serve in which the player, both tosses and strikes the ball with topspin, making the ball drop sharply. This is differentiated from "standing topspin" serves in that the player jumps before contact. Elite players can incorporate small amounts of sidespin in addition to topspin to induce more horizontal movement, thus harder to pass
- Overhead serve : A broad term describing any serve where the ball is contracted above one's head while standing
- Standing float : An easier variation of the "Jump float" where the player does not jump prior to contact
- Standing topspin : An easier variation of the "jump serve" where the player does not jump prior to contact
- Sidespin : A serve in which the ball is tossed and struck with sidespin, inducing strong lateral movement. This is done through contacting the ball on the side of which you intend to add the spin, while simultaneously snapping the wrist in the direction conducting the path of the ball. This serve can be conducted while jumping or standing
- Underhand : The simplest variation of serving where the player holds the ball in their non-dominant hand below their waist and strikes it with their dominant hand

== Slang terms ==
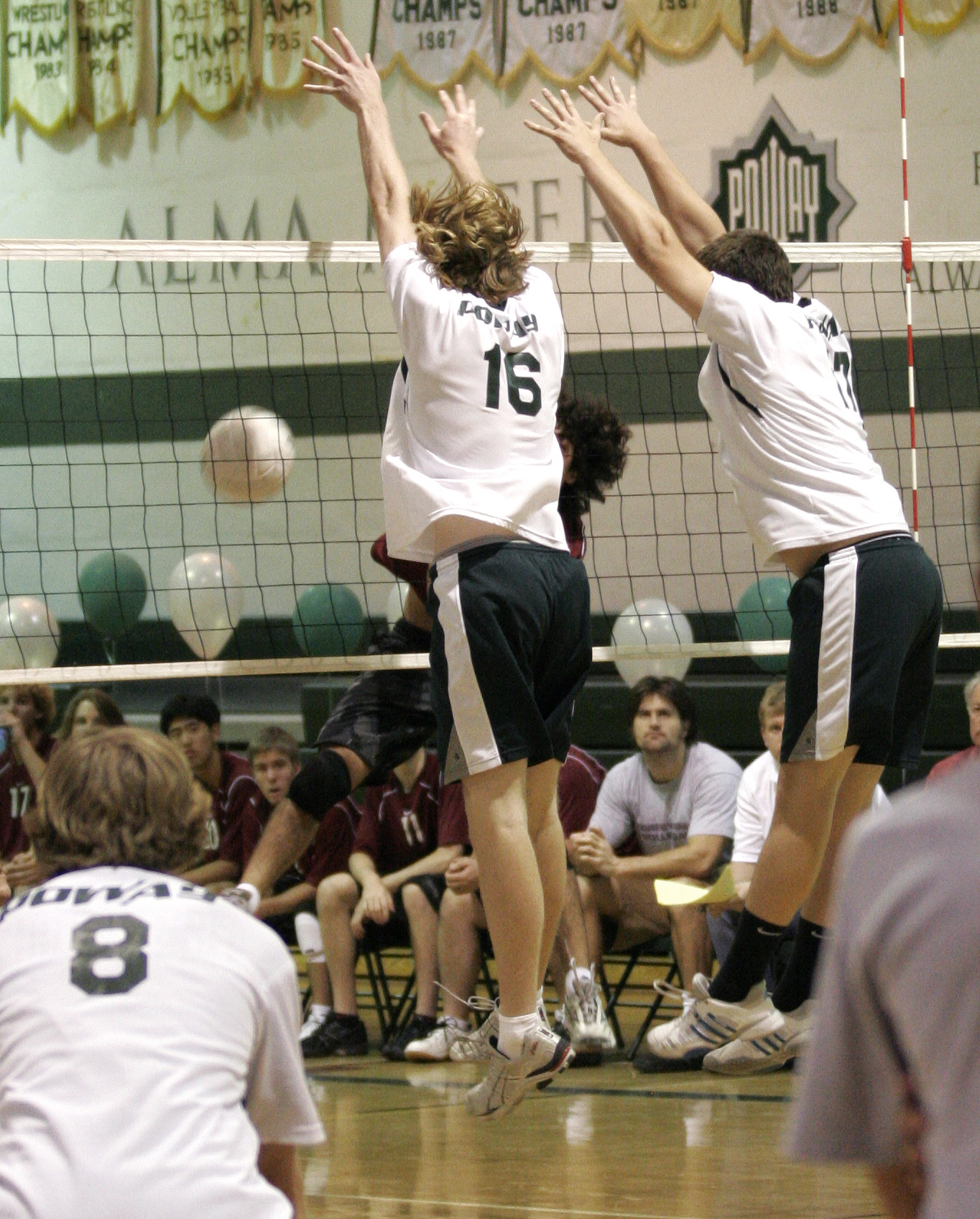
A hitter gets "roofed" by the blockers.

- Ape: When a player mindlessly spikes the ball on the first or second touch with little to no intention of winning the point. Most of these spikes do not go over the net and are usually only done when up a significant margin or down to the point that a comeback is impossible.
- Bang or Bouncer or Thump: A ball spiked very hard with a steep downward angle. It is common for players to show off their skills by "bouncing balls" before games.
- Beer: When an attacked ball goes through a defenders legs. After being "beered" the defender then owes the attacker a beer
- Blash: When a ball is blocked and the ball travels faster from the blocker to the floor than the attacker to the block. Made famous by Cameron Billingham, the term comes from a combination of the words "block" and "smash"
- Block City: A fictional place that players claim to go when they are blocking very well. Also known as "Turkey Town". (See "Stuff Turkey")
- Butter or Nectar or Sauce or Smoothie or Cheddar Biscuits : A perfect set
- Chowder : A badly mangled set
- Crab Defense: When a player is serving, the opposing three passers shuffle side to side and pinch their hands like crabs to distract the server
- Deep Dish or Chicago style pizza or Evan set : An illegal set that is held excessively long, typically set from below the shoulders and seen in beach volleyball.
- Dime or Rock : A perfect pass
- Dirt Dessert: When a player gets a kill so sweet, it's almost comparable to the utter sweetness of a classic Dirt Dessert
- Double-double : When a player accumulates double-digit amounts in two of five statistical categories—aces, kills, blocks, digs, and assists—during one match
- Easy : What a defending player should yell at the top of their lungs when successfully digging a very hard hit attack or perfectly passing a hard serve, as if to say that the attacking/serving player is easy
- Facial or Six-Pack or Tattoo or Dome or Head-Tap : When a defending player gets hit in the face with the ball either from an attack by the opposing team or by a deflection off the block. The term "six-pack" refers to the dizzying sensation of being hit directly in the head or face by a volleyball as being analogous to the dizzying sensation of having drunk a six pack of beer. The abdominal muscles are sometimes referred to as a "six-pack," so getting hit in the stomach by the ball is getting 'six-packed.' The term "tattoo" refers to marks left on the skin of the hit player by the seams/lettering on the ball
- Fishing: Making illegal contact with the net
- Hands : Hand setting. Someone with "nice hands" sets well
- Heat or Zing : Speed. Used to describe a hard-hit ball
- Hops or Bunnies or Springs or Bounce : A term used to label a player who has an immense vertical leap
- House or Stuff or Roof : When the defensive player blocks a ball so hard that it is immediately returned to the hitter and goes straight to the floor
- Hubby-wife or Campfire : In beach volleyball, when a serve drops between two players because the players don't decide in time who will pass it
- Jet Nai Heed : The act of intentionally blocking a spike from the opposing team
- Jumbo: A high roll shot aimed to go just over other players heads typically used during Beach Volleyball
- Jungleball or Barbecue ball or Picnic ball : A volleyball game played by inexperienced players with little ball control
- Killing Ants : when a player digging a hit passes the ball directly into the ground
- Killshot : on a serve or a swing when the ball hits the passers neck or chest region, in between digging and getting facialed
- Lombardo: A beach volley player who demonstrates a gross lack of skill, knowledge, or style. "That lombardo has been throwing party balls all day!"
- Nail : A perfect pass
- No-lookie Cookie: When a hitter appears going cross then drills it down line without turning their head to look
- O.T. : When an attacker hits the ball over top of the blocker and it lands in front of the defense
- Overkill : When an overpass (or a free ball) occurs and the opposing team attacks the ball for a kill
- Paintbrush or Whiff: A mishit — when a player attempts to hit (or spike) the ball with the open hand and nearly misses the ball, only contacting the ball with their fingers, resulting in a backspin on the ball
- Pancake : A fully extended dig by a defender where the ball hits the top of the players hand instead of hitting the floor
- Pancake Lake : An imaginary place a player (normally libero) goes when they repeatedly pancake a tipped ball or ball headed for the ground
- Party Ball : Opportunity for a front row player to return an overpassed ball with a hit
- Party Foul : A failed attempt at a Party Ball
- Phone Booth : When a blocker's hands seal off every possible attack angle on a set ball. Often referred to as, "It's like trying to hit out of a phone booth."
- Pineapple : An attack on the second contact by the setter of a team, usually with the right hand designed to land in the deep corner of the court. Often done without looking at the target for deception. Made famous by USA setter Lloy Ball when playing in college.
- Popcorn setting or Sprinkler : When an unskilled setter is sending sets in a random pattern (like popcorn being popped, or like a water sprinkler on the grass)
- Quadruple-double : When a player amasses a double-digit total in four of five statistical categories—aces, kills, blocks, digs, and assists—during a match
- Quintuple-double : When a player accomplishes ten or more aces, kills, blocks, digs, and assists during a match
- Rainbow : A shot especially on the beach that is hit over the head of the defender to the far corner and lands cleanly. Also known as a Jumbo Shrimp (due to the arc/shape of the shot)
- Ref : A variation of "Refs", but one that is socially accepted by the players
- Refs : Collective noun for those officiating at a volleyball event - including referees and lines people. Often mocked for wearing predominantly white shoes on a beach volleyball event
- Reverse sweep : When a team wins the final three sets after losing the first two.
- Rufio : A cheer done in volleyball, famous from the movie Hook, where a player blocks the opposing player straight down on the opposing players' side. Players scream, "Rufio, Rufio, Ru-fi-OOOOOO!!!"
- A Scotford : To celebrate heartily after officiating at an event, sometimes by wearing the headwear of many nations
- Scrappy : Referring to a team that doesn't let a single ball hit the ground without much effort. (used positively)
- Shag : Picking up and collecting scattered volleyballs
- Skunk or Skunk rule : A win that occurs when a team scores 7 points while the opposition has not scored. Similar to the mercy rule
- Spalding: when the hitters hit the ball and it hits the opposing defensive team in the face or on their body. Spalding refers to the letters of the ball staying on the players face because it hit them so hard
- Spatch or Waffle: When a player attacking the ball contacts it with essentially no spin, causing a lateral movement pattern similar to that of a float serve, typically resulting in the ball flying out of bounds
- Spiketown or Bouncetown or Poundtown: A fictional place that a hitter claims to go to when they get an impressive kill that bounces very high and no one can return (often near the 3 meter line)
- Stuff Turkey: A stuff block in which the ball hits the opponents' floor before the blocker does; When such an event occurs, a player is said to have had their turkey stuffed
- Sui-set: A ball set too close to the net directly in to the hands of a waiting blocker; the attacker will get blocked most of the time
- The Shed : A fictional place blockers who frequently lose points due to tool-style attacks are claimed to be taken to by hitters
- Tip : An attack which is reduced in speed in an attempt to land directly over the block or near the net (usually made with and open hand soft hit rather than a spike)
- Tool or Use : An attack which is deflected off an opponent (usually during a block) and is unplayable resulting in a point for the attacking team (also called a bounce off)
- Tool Time: A phrase used to celebrate the occurrence of a tool-style attack or when a player manages to successfully tool the opponent multiple times in rapid succession
- Tough Bacon : Any ball that is played in a way that makes it difficult for the next player to successfully play the ball. For instance, after a bad set the intended hitter might remark "that was tough bacon". Similarly, a setter might remark as such after a bad pass, or a passer might remark as such after a difficult serve
- Trap : A ball set too close to the net where the hitter typically gets stuffed
- Triple-double : When a player, during a single match, scores at least ten times in three of five statistical categories: Aces, kills, blocks, digs, and assists
- Up : A players ability to receive a hard hit ball by a pass.
- Vegas Line: A kill resulting from a powerful hard-line spike that penetrates or beats the opponents' line block. Named after Sean Rosenthal, a member of the AVP who delivered such a memorable kill in Las Vegas in 2005
- Waffle: See spatch or waffle above. Also used to describe a pancake (see above) but done with a foot instead of a hand
- Waterfall Ball: When a player's hit goes inside the block of the opposing team and falls down on their side much like a waterfall
- Yummy: When a player gets a kill out of an overpass from the opposing team

== Statistics ==
- Hitting percentage: Is defined as the number of kills minus the number of errors, divided by the total attacks
- Kill percentage: Is defined as the number of kills divided by the total attacks
- Point scoring percentage (PS%): The number of times the serving players team scores while that player is serving divided by the number of total serves
- Rotation points: Is defined as the total points a team scored on a specific player's serve
