= FIVB Beach Volleyball World Championships =

International beach volleyball championship

- Current season, competition or edition: 2025 Beach Volleyball World Championships
- Sport: Beach volleyball
- Founded: 1997; 29 years ago
- No. of teams: 48
- Continent: International (FIVB)
- Most recent champions: Sweden (men); Latvia (women)
- Most titles: Brazil (men; 7 titles); Brazil (women; 6 titles)

The FIVB Beach Volleyball World Championships is the double-gender world championship for the sport of beach volleyball organized by the Fédération Internationale de Volleyball (FIVB) the sport's global governing body. The first official edition of the event was held in Los Angeles, United States in 1997 and tournaments had been awarded every two years since then. Before 1997, ten unofficial championships not organized by the FIVB were all held in Rio de Janeiro, Brazil between 1987 and 1996. The most recent World Championships took place in Australia in 2025.

Winning the World Championships is considered to be one of the highest honours in international beach volleyball, surpassing the FIVB Beach Volleyball World Tour and being surpassed only by the beach volleyball tournament at the Summer Olympic Games.

== Format ==
The tournament has a 48-team main draw per gender and consists of two stages: the group stage followed by the knockout stage. The prize pool for each gender is US$500,000.

== Editions ==
First Beach Volleyball World Championships were held from 10 to 13 September 1997 in Los Angeles, California (United States). It was the first official edition of this event, after 10 unofficial championships between 1987 and 1996.

Edition	Year	Host city	Host country	Events
1987–1996: 10 Unofficial World Championships before recognition by FIVB
1	1997	Los Angeles	United States	2
2	1999	Marseille	France	2
3	2001	Klagenfurt - Maria Wörth - Velden	Austria	2
4	2003	Rio de Janeiro	Brazil	2
5	2005	Berlin	Germany	2
6	2007	Gstaad	Switzerland	2
7	2009	Stavanger	Norway	2
8	2011	Rome	Italy	2
9	2013	Stare Jabłonki	Poland	2
10	2015	The Hague - Amsterdam - Apeldoorn - Rotterdam	Netherlands	2
11	2017	Vienna	Austria	2
12	2019	Hamburg	Germany	2
13	2022	Rome	Italy	2
14	2023	Tlaxcala - Apizaco - Huamantla	Mexico	2
15	2025	Adelaide	Australia	2
16	2027	The Hague - Amsterdam - Apeldoorn - Rotterdam	Netherlands	2

== Men's tournament ==
Year	Host city	Gold medal match			Bronze medal match			Teams
Year	Host city	Gold Medalists	Score	Silver Medalists	Bronze Medalists	Score	4th place	Teams
1997; Details	(United States); Los Angeles	(Brazil); Rogério Ferreira and Guilherme Marques	2–1	(United States); Canyon Ceman and Mike Whitmarsh	(United States); Dain Blanton and Kent Steffes (Brazil); Paulão Moreira and Paulo Emilio Silva	was not played, both pairs who lost at semi-finals were awarded a bronze medals		56
1999; Details	(France); Marseille	(Brazil); José Loiola and Emanuel Rego	1–0	(Switzerland); Martin Laciga and Paul Laciga	(Brazil); Rogério Ferreira and Guilherme Marques	1–0	(Spain); Javier Bosma and Fabio Díez	87
2001; Details	Austria	(Argentina); Mariano Baracetti and Martín Conde	2–1	(Brazil); José Loiola and Ricardo Santos	(Norway); Vegard Høidalen and Jørre Kjemperud	2–0	(United States); Rob Heidger and Chip McCaw	48
2003; Details	(Brazil); Rio de Janeiro	(Brazil); Emanuel Rego and Ricardo Santos	2–0	(United States); Dax Holdren and Stein Metzger	(Brazil); Márcio Araújo and Benjamin Insfran	2–0 awarded (walkover)	(Portugal); João Brenha and Miguel Maia	48
2005; Details	(Germany); Berlin	(Brazil); Márcio Araújo and Fábio Luiz Magalhães	2–0	(Switzerland); Sascha Heyer and Paul Laciga	(Germany); Julius Brink and Kjell Schneider	2–1	(Germany); Marvin Polte and Thorsten Schön	48
2007; Details	(Switzerland); Gstaad	(United States); Phil Dalhausser and Todd Rogers	2–0	(Russia); Dmitri Barsuk and Igor Kolodinsky	(Australia); Andrew Schacht and Joshua Slack	2–0	(Brazil); Emanuel Rego and Ricardo Santos	48
2009; Details	(Norway); Stavanger	(Germany); Julius Brink and Jonas Reckermann	2–0	(Brazil); Alison Cerutti and Harley Marques Silva	(United States); Phil Dalhausser and Todd Rogers	2–0	(Germany); David Klemperer and Eric Koreng	48
2011; Details	(Italy); Rome	(Brazil); Alison Cerutti and Emanuel Rego	2–0	(Brazil); Márcio Araújo and Ricardo Santos	(Germany); Julius Brink and Jonas Reckermann	2–1	(Latvia); Mārtiņš Pļaviņš and Jānis Šmēdiņš	48
2013; Details	(Poland); Stare Jabłonki	(Netherlands); Alexander Brouwer and Robert Meeuwsen	2–0	(Brazil); Álvaro Morais Filho and Ricardo Santos	(Germany); Jonathan Erdmann and Kay Matysik	2–0	(Brazil); Alison Cerutti and Emanuel Rego	48
2015; Details	Netherlands	(Brazil); Alison Cerutti and Bruno Oscar Schmidt	2–1	(Netherlands); Reinder Nummerdor and Christiaan Varenhorst	(Brazil); Evandro Oliveira and Pedro Solberg	2–0	(United States); Theo Brunner and Nick Lucena	48
2017; Details	(Austria); Vienna	(Brazil); Evandro Oliveira and André Stein	2–0	(Austria); Clemens Doppler and Alexander Horst	(Russia); Viacheslav Krasilnikov and Nikita Liamin	2–0	(Netherlands); Maarten van Garderen and Christiaan Varenhorst	48
2019; Details	(Germany); Hamburg	(Russia); Oleg Stoyanovskiy and Viacheslav Krasilnikov	2–1	(Germany); Julius Thole and Clemens Wickler	(Norway); Anders Mol and Christian Sørum	2–1	(United States); Tri Bourne and Trevor Crabb	48
2022; Details	(Italy); Rome	(Norway); Anders Mol and Christian Sørum	2–0	(Brazil); Renato Carvalho and Vitor Felipe	(Brazil); André Stein and George Wanderley	2–1	(United States); Chaim Schalk and Theodore Brunner	48
2023; Details	Mexico	(Czech Republic); Ondřej Perušič and David Schweiner	2–1	(Sweden); David Åhman and Jonatan Hellvig	(Poland); Bartosz Łosiak and Michał Bryl	2–0	(United States); Trevor Crabb and Theodore Brunner	48
2025; Details	(Australia); Adelaide	(Sweden); David Åhman and Jonatan Hellvig	2–0	(Sweden); Jacob Nilsson and Elmer Andersson	(France); Téo Rotar and Arnaud Gauthier-Rat	2–0	(Germany); Nils Ehlers and Clemens Wickler	48

=== Medals table ===
Rank	Nation	Gold	Silver	Bronze	Total
1	Brazil	7	5	5	17
2	United States	1	2	2	5
3	Sweden	1	2	0	3
4	Germany	1	1	3	5
5	Russia	1	1	1	3
6	Netherlands	1	1	0	2
7	Norway	1	0	2	3
8	Argentina	1	0	0	1
8	Czech Republic	1	0	0	1
10	Switzerland	0	2	0	2
11	Austria	0	1	0	1
12	Australia	0	0	1	1
12	France	0	0	1	1
12	Poland	0	0	1	1
Totals (14 entries)		15	15	16	46

== Women's tournament ==
Year	Host city	Gold medal match			Bronze medal match			Teams
Year	Host city	Gold Medalists	Score	Silver Medalists	Bronze Medalists	Score	4th place	Teams
1997; Details	(United States); Los Angeles	(Brazil); Sandra Pires and Jackie Silva	2–1	(United States); Lisa Arce and Holly McPeak	(Brazil); Shelda Bede and Adriana Behar (United States); Karolyn Kirby and Nancy Reno	was not played, both pairs who lost at semi-finals were awarded a bronze medals		45
1999; Details	(France); Marseille	(Brazil); Shelda Bede and Adriana Behar	1–0	(United States); Annett Davis and Jenny Johnson Jordan	(United States); Liz Masakayan and Elaine Youngs	1–0 awarded (walkover)	(Brazil); Sandra Pires and Adriana Samuel	71
2001; Details	Austria	(Brazil); Shelda Bede and Adriana Behar	2–0	(Brazil); Tatiana Minello and Sandra Pires	(Czech Republic); Eva Celbová and Soňa Nováková	2–0	(United States); Barbra Fontana and Elaine Youngs	47
2003; Details	(Brazil); Rio de Janeiro	(United States); Misty May and Kerri Walsh	2–0	(Brazil); Shelda Bede and Adriana Behar	(Australia); Natalie Cook and Nicole Sanderson	2–0	(United States); Annett Davis and Jenny Johnson Jordan	47
2005; Details	(Germany); Berlin	(United States); Misty May-Treanor and Kerri Walsh	2–0	(Brazil); Larissa França and Juliana Silva	(China); Tian Jia and Wang Fei	2–0	(Cuba); Dalixia Fernández and Tamara Larrea	48
2007; Details	(Switzerland); Gstaad	(United States); Misty May-Treanor and Kerri Walsh	2–0	(China); Tian Jia and Wang Jie	(Brazil); Larissa França and Juliana Silva	2–1	(China); Xue Chen and Zhang Xi	48
2009; Details	(Norway); Stavanger	(United States); Jennifer Kessy and April Ross	2–0	(Brazil); Larissa França and Juliana Silva	(Brazil); Maria Elisa Antonelli and Talita Antunes	2–0	(Brazil); Shelda Bede and Ana Paula Connelly	48
2011; Details	(Italy); Rome	(Brazil); Larissa França and Juliana Silva	2–1	(United States); Misty May-Treanor and Kerri Walsh	(China); Xue Chen and Zhang Xi	2–0	(Czech Republic); Lenka Háječková and Hana Klapalová	48
2013; Details	(Poland); Stare Jabłonki	(China); Xue Chen and Zhang Xi	2–1	(Germany); Karla Borger and Britta Büthe	(Brazil); Liliane Maestrini and Bárbara Seixas	2–0	(United States); Whitney Pavlik and April Ross	48
2015; Details	Netherlands	(Brazil); Ágatha Bednarczuk and Bárbara Seixas	2–0	(Brazil); Fernanda Alves and Taiana Lima	(Brazil); Maria Elisa Antonelli and Juliana Silva	2–1	(Germany); Katrin Holtwick and Ilka Semmler	48
2017; Details	(Austria); Vienna	(Germany); Laura Ludwig and Kira Walkenhorst	2–1	(United States); April Ross and Lauren Fendrick	(Brazil); Larissa França and Talita Antunes	2–1	(Canada); Sarah Pavan and Melissa Humana-Paredes	48
2019; Details	(Germany); Hamburg	(Canada); Sarah Pavan and Melissa Humana-Paredes	2–0	(United States); Alix Klineman and April Ross	(Australia); Taliqua Clancy and Mariafe Artacho del Solar	2–0	(Switzerland); Nina Betschart and Tanja Hüberli	48
2022; Details	(Italy); Rome	(Brazil); Eduarda Santos Lisboa and Ana Patrícia Ramos	2–0	(Canada); Sophie Bukovec and Brandie Wilkerson	(Germany); Svenja Müller and Cinja Tillmann	2–1	(Switzerland); Joana Heidrich and Anouk Vergé-Dépré	48
2023; Details	Mexico	(United States); Sara Hughes and Kelly Cheng	2–0	(Brazil); Ana Patrícia Ramos and Eduarda Santos Lisboa	(United States); Kristen Nuss and Taryn Kloth	2–1	(Australia); Mariafe Artacho del Solar and Taliqua Clancy	48
2025; Details	(Australia); Adelaide	(Latvia); Tīna Graudiņa and Anastasija Samoilova	2–1	(United States); Kristen Nuss and Taryn Brasher	(Brazil); Carolina Solberg Salgado and Rebecca Cavalcante	2–0	(Brazil); Thâmela Coradello Galil and Victória Lopes	48

=== Medals table ===
Rank	Nation	Gold	Silver	Bronze	Total
1	Brazil	6	6	7	19
2	United States	5	6	3	14
3	China	1	1	2	4
4	Germany	1	1	1	3
5	Canada	1	1	0	2
6	Latvia	1	0	0	1
7	Australia	0	0	2	2
8	Czech Republic	0	0	1	1
Totals (8 entries)		15	15	16	46

== Combined medal table ==
Rank	Nation	Gold	Silver	Bronze	Total
1	Brazil	13	11	12	36
2	United States	6	8	5	19
3	Germany	2	2	4	8
4	Sweden	1	2	0	3
5	China	1	1	2	4
6	Russia	1	1	1	3
7	Canada	1	1	0	2
7	Netherlands	1	1	0	2
9	Norway	1	0	2	3
10	Czech Republic	1	0	1	2
11	Argentina	1	0	0	1
11	Latvia	1	0	0	1
13	Switzerland	0	2	0	2
14	Austria	0	1	0	1
15	Australia	0	0	3	3
16	France	0	0	1	1
16	Poland	0	0	1	1
Totals (17 entries)		30	30	32	92

== See also ==
- Beach volleyball at the Summer Olympics
- FIVB Beach Volleyball World Tour
- European Beach Volleyball Tour
- FIVB Beach Volleyball U23 World Championships
- FIVB Beach Volleyball U21 World Championships
- FIVB Beach Volleyball U19 World Championships
- FIVB Beach Volleyball U17 World Championships
