= 1994 European Beach Volleyball Championships =

International beach volleyball competition

The 1994 European Beach Volleyball Championships were held in August, 1994 men's in Almería, Spain and women's in Espinho, Portugal. It was the second official edition of the men's event, which started in 1993, while the women competed for the first time.

== Men's competition ==
RANK	FINAL RANKING
1st place, gold medalist(s)	Jan Kvalheim and Bjørn Maaseide (NOR)
2nd place, silver medalist(s)	Santi Aguilera and Javier Bosma (ESP)
3rd place, bronze medalist(s)	Jörg Ahmann and Axel Hager (GER)

== Women's competition ==
RANK	FINAL RANKING
1st place, gold medalist(s)	Beate Bühler and Danja Müsch (GER)
2nd place, silver medalist(s)	Martina Hudcová and Dolores Storková (CZE)
3rd place, bronze medalist(s)	Cristiana Parenzan and Lucilla Perrotta (ITA)
