= Paulão Moreira =

Brazilian beach volleyball player (1969–2025)

Personal information
- Full name: Paulo Roberto Moreira da Costa
- Born: April 29, 1969; Salvador, Bahia, Brazil
- Died: September 2, 2025 (aged 56)
Honours
Men's beach volleyball
Representing Brazil
World Championships
Bronze medal – third place	1997 Los Angeles	Beach

Paulo Roberto "Paulão" Moreira da Costa (April 29, 1969 – September 2, 2025) was a Brazilian beach volleyball player. He won the bronze medal at the 1997 World Championships in Los Angeles, California, partnering Paulo Emilio Silva.

Moreira died on September 2, 2025, at the age of 56.
