= 1998 European Beach Volleyball Championships =

International beach volleyball competition

The 1998 European Beach Volleyball Championships were held from August 24 to August 27, 1998, on the island of Rhodes in Greece. It was the sixth official edition of the men's event, which started in 1993, while the women competed for the fifth time.

== Men's competition ==
RANK	FINAL RANKING
1st place, gold medalist(s)	Martin Laciga and Paul Laciga (SUI)
2nd place, silver medalist(s)	Jan Kvalheim and Bjørn Maaseide (NOR)
3rd place, bronze medalist(s)	Vegard Høidalen and Jørre Kjemperud (NOR)
4.	Milan Dzavoronok and Marek Pakosta (CZE)

== Women's competition ==
RANK	FINAL RANKING
1st place, gold medalist(s)	Eva Celbová and Sona Novaková (CZE)
2nd place, silver medalist(s)	Rebekka Kadijk and Debora Schoon-Kadijk (NED)
3rd place, bronze medalist(s)	Laura Bruschini and Annamaria Solazzi (ITA)
4.	Magi Schlaefli and Nicole Schnyder-Benoit (SUI)
