= CBVA =

CBVA may refer to:

- CBVA-FM, a radio rebroadcaster (98.1 FM) licensed to Escuminac, Quebec, Canada, rebroadcasting CBVE-FM
- CBVA-TV, a television retransmitter (channel 18) licensed to Escuminac, Quebec, Canada, retransmitting CBMT
- California Beach Volleyball Association, governing body for beach volleyball
