= Bjørn Maaseide =

Norwegian beach volleyball player (born 1968)

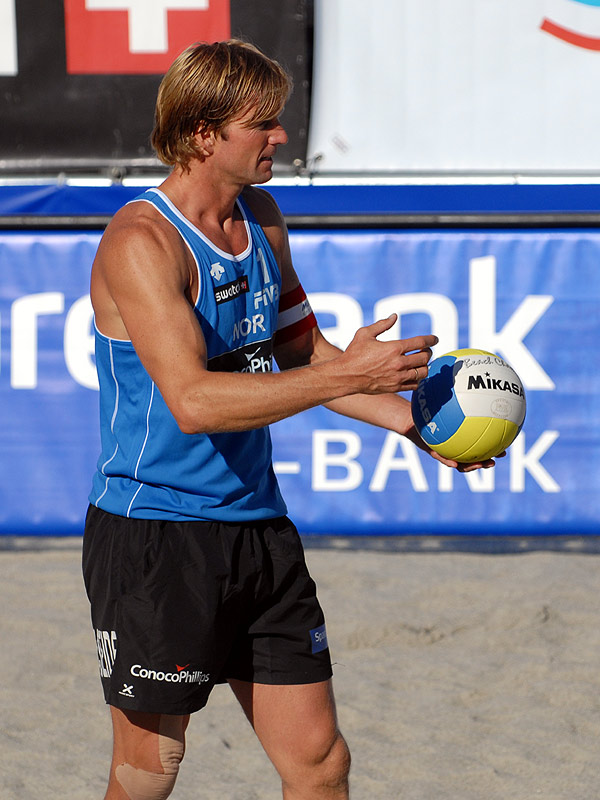

Personal information
- Nationality: Norwegian
- Born: March 7, 1968 (age 58); Stavanger, Norway
- Height: 6 ft 6 in (198 cm)
Honours
Men's beach volleyball
Representing Norway
European Championships
Gold medal – first place	1994 Almería	Beach
Silver medal – second place	1993 Almería	Beach
Silver medal – second place	1997 Rome	Beach
Silver medal – second place	1998 Rhodos	Beach
Bronze medal – third place	1999 Palma de Mallorca	Beach
Goodwill Games
Gold medal – first place	1994 St. Petersburg	Beach

Bjørn Maaseide (born 7 March 1968) is a Norwegian former beach volleyball player. He represented Norway in three consecutive Summer Olympics: 1996, 2000, and 2004. Alongside Jan Kvalheim, he won several medals at the European Championships in the 1990s. He is the brother of professional beach volleyball player Kathrine Maaseide. Other playing partners are Iver Horrem and Vegard Høidalen.

In 2007, Maaseide returned to the sand with Horrem. At the World Championships in Gstaad, they were knocked out in the first main round for the third time in a row, this time against the Brazilians Franco–Cunha. After the Norwegian duo did not qualify for the 2008 Summer Olympics, Maaseide turned his attention to the next World Championships. His commitment helped bring the 2009 Beach Volleyball World Championships to his hometown of Stavanger.

Sporting positions
Preceded by Roberto Lopes and Franco Neto (BRA)	Men's FIVB Beach Volley World Tour Winner alongside (Norway) Jan Kvalheim; 1994	Succeeded by Roberto Lopes and Franco Neto (BRA)
