= Canyon Ceman =

American beach volleyball player

Personal information
- Born: June 29, 1972 (age 54); Hermosa Beach, California, U.S.
Medal record
Men's beach volleyball
Representing the United States
World Championships
Silver medal – second place	1997 Los Angeles	Beach
World Tour
Bronze medal – third place	2003 Carson	Beach

Canyon Ceman (born June 29, 1972) is a former American beach volleyball player. He won the silver medal at the 1997 World Championships in Los Angeles, California, partnering Mike Whitmarsh. He was most recently the Senior Director of Talent Development for American professional wrestling company WWE.

== Career ==
=== Volleyball ===
Ceman played volleyball as a setter, and was a collegiate All-American in both 1992 and 1993. He played for the Stanford Cardinal in college, and was part of the team that reached the NCAA finals in 1992. The following year, Ceman was named the 1993 National Collegiate Player of the Year. After finishing college, he played on the Association of Volleyball Professionals (AVP) tour for 15 years, during which time he was ranked in the top 10 in 10 different years. Canyon Ceman also played Intramural Volleyball while at UCLA's Anderson School of Business. He joined with fellow former AVP Volleyball player and Stanford University Volleyball player John Hribar (UCLA Law 2003) to lead a team of scrubs to the UCLA Open Division Volleyball Championship.

=== Executive ===
After finishing up his playing career, Ceman became the chief financial officer of the AVP until it closed in August 2010.

In March 2012, Ceman began working as the Senior Director of Talent Development for WWE. As part of his job, he oversees the developmental program NXT and scouts athletic talent at events including NCAA Wrestling and World's Strongest Man competitions.

On July 23, 2021, it was reported that Ceman had been released from WWE, ending his nine year tenure with the company.

== Personal life ==
Ceman has an undergraduate degree from Stanford University. He later obtained a Master of Business Administration, specialising in entrepreneurial studies and finance, from the University of California, Los Angeles. Ceman is married with two children.
