= José Loiola =

Brazilian beach volleyball player

Personal information
- Full name: José Geraldo Loiola
- Born: March 28, 1970 (age 56); Vitória, Brazil
- Height: 6 ft 4 in (193 cm)
Honours
Men's beach volleyball
Representing Brazil
World Championships
| Gold medal – first place | 1999 Marseille | Beach |
| Silver medal – second place | 2001 Klagenfurt | Beach |

José Geraldo Loiola (born March 28, 1970) is a Brazilian former beach volleyball player. He won the gold medal at the 1999 Beach Volleyball World Championships in Marseille, partnering with Emanuel Rego.

Loiola began playing beach volleyball in the AVP in 1993 with partner Eduardo "Anjinho" Bacil. He was selected as the AVP Rookie of the Year in 1993. He eventually won 11 tournaments partnering with Adam Johnson and 17 partnering with Kent Steffes. He was named MVP of the AVP tour in 1997, and was voted Best Offensive Player of the AVP four times. In total, he won 55 tournaments and $1,900,000 in prize money in the AVP and FIVB. Loiola was noted for his exceptional vertical jump.

Loiola represented his native country at the 2000 Summer Olympics in Sydney, and added a silver medal to his tally a year later at the 2001 Beach Volleyball World Championships in Klagenfurt, alongside Ricardo Santos.

== Hall of Fame ==
In 2014, Loiola was inducted into the California Beach Volleyball Hall of Fame. In 2017, he was inducted into the International Volleyball Hall of Fame.

== Coaching ==
Loiola coached Sara Hughes and Kelly Claes of the United States in preparation for the 2020 Olympic beach volleyball qualification. He currently works as a coach for the United States beach national team.

== Awards ==
- AVP Rookie of the Year 1993
- AVP Most Valuable Player 1997
- Four-time AVP Best Offensive Player 1995, 1996, 1997, 1998
- Gold Medal at World Championships at Marseille 1999
- CBVA Hall of Fame 2014
- International Volleyball Hall of Fame 2017

Sporting positions
| Preceded by Guilherme Marques and Rogerio Ferreira (BRA) | Men's FIVB Beach Volley World Tour Winner alongside (Brazil) Emanuel Rego; 1999 | Succeeded by Ricardo Santos and Zé Marco de Melo (BRA) |
