= Luizão Corrêa =

Brazilian beach volleyball player (born 1973)

Personal information
- Full name: Luiz Corrêa de Jesus
- Nickname: Luizão
- Born: June 7, 1973 (age 53); Manaus, Brazil
- Height: 6 ft 6 in (1.98 m)

Beach volleyball information
Teammate
Paulo Emilio Silva
Honours
Men's beach volleyball
Representing Brazil
Pan American Games
Silver medal – second place	2003 Santo Domingo	Beach

Luiz "Luizão" Corrêa de Jesus (born June 7, 1973, in Manaus) is a male beach volleyball player from Brazil who won the silver medal in the men's beach team competition at the 2003 Pan American Games in Santo Domingo, Dominican Republic, partnering with Paulo Emilio Silva.
