= Guilherme Marques =

Brazilian beach volleyball player (born 1969)

Personal information
- Full name: Guilherme Luiz Marques
- Born: June 26, 1969 (age 57); Juiz de Fora, Brazil
- Height: 6 ft 4 in (1.93 m)
Honours
Men's beach volleyball
Representing Brazil
World Championships
Gold medal – first place	1997 Los Angeles	Beach
Bronze medal – third place	1999 Marseille	Beach

Guilherme Luiz Marques (born June 26, 1969) is a Brazilian retired male beach volleyball player who won the gold medal at the 1997 World Championships in Los Angeles, California, partnering with Rogerio Ferreira. Two years later, the couple claimed the bronze medal at the World Championships in Marseille, France.

Sporting positions
Preceded by Emanuel Rego and Zé Marco de Melo (BRA)	Men's FIVB Beach Volley World Tour Winner alongside (Brazil) Rogério Ferreira; 1998	Succeeded by Emanuel Rego and José Loiola (BRA)
