= Ricardo Santos (beach volleyball) =

Brazilian beach volleyball player (born 1975)

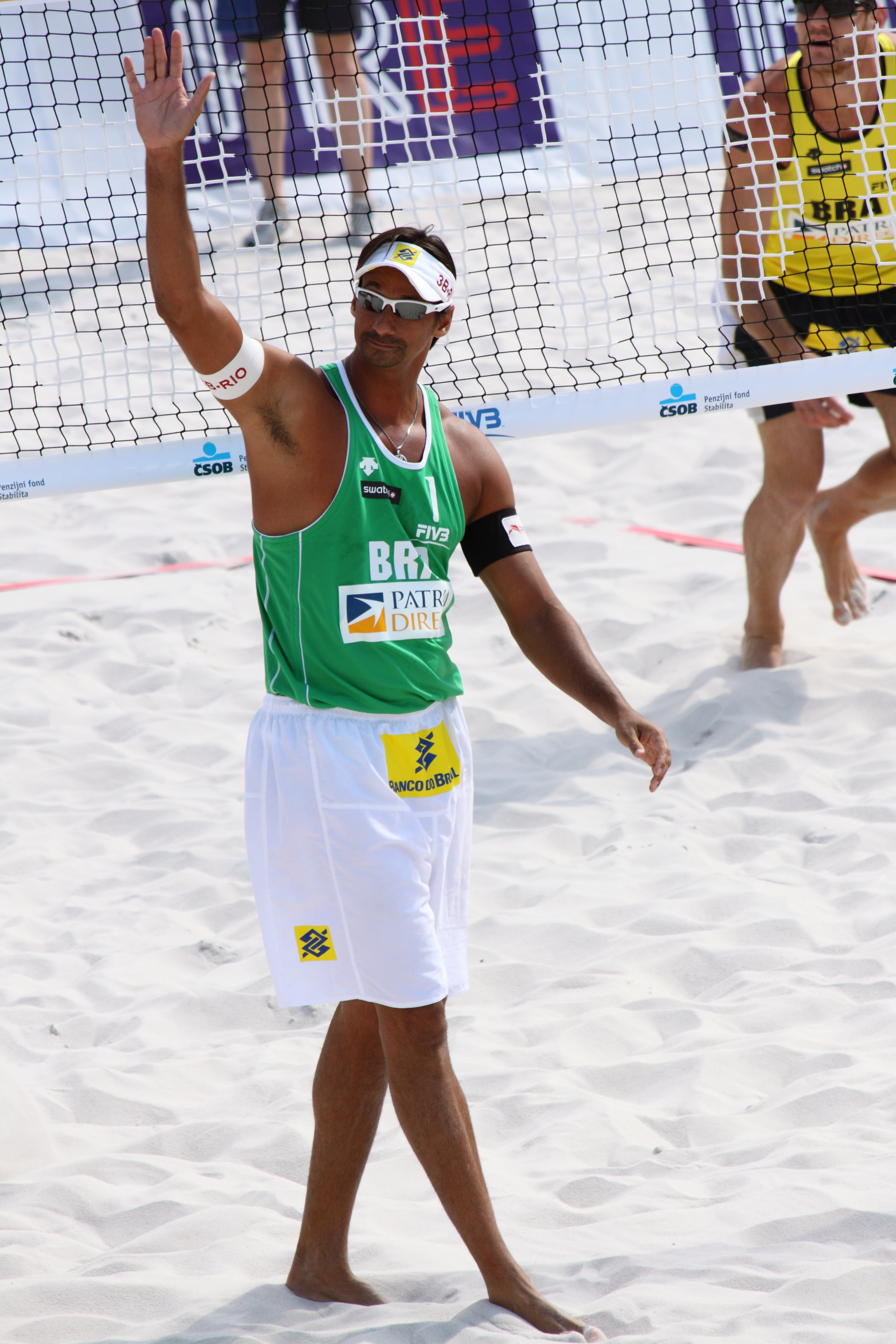
- Santos at Patria Direct Open 2012

Personal information
- Full name: Ricardo Alex Costa Santos
- Born: 6 January 1975 (age 51); Salvador, Bahia, Brazil
- Hometown: João Pessoa
- Height: 200 cm (6 ft 7 in)
- Weight: 103 kg (227 lb)

Beach volleyball information

Current teammate
| Years | Teammate |
|---|---|
| 2009 | Emanuel Rego |

Best results
| Years | Location | Result |
|---|---|---|
| 2004 | Athens | 1st |
Honours
Men's beach volleyball
Representing Brazil
Olympic Games
| Gold medal – first place | 2004 Athens | Beach |
| Silver medal – second place | 2000 Sydney | Beach |
| Bronze medal – third place | 2008 Beijing | Beach |
World Championships
| Gold medal – first place | 2003 Rio de Janeiro | Beach |
| Silver medal – second place | 2001 Klagenfurt | Beach |
| Silver medal – second place | 2011 Rome | Beach |
| Silver medal – second place | 2013 Stare Jabłonki | Beach |
Pan American Games
| Gold medal – first place | 2007 Rio de Janeiro | Beach |
- Last updated: 7 July 2013

Ricardo Alex Costa Santos (born 6 January 1975) is a Brazilian beach volleyball player.

Santos won the silver medal in the men's beach volleyball competition at the 2000 Summer Olympics in Sydney with partner Zé Marco de Melo. Santos also represented his native country at the 2004 Summer Olympics in Athens. There he claimed the gold medal, teaming up with Emanuel Rego, with whom he won the world title in October 2003. The same pairing went on to win the bronze medal at the 2008 Summer Olympics in Beijing.

At the 2012 Summer Olympics in London, he teamed with Pedro Cunha, but they lost in the quarter-finals.

Sporting positions
| Preceded by Emanuel Rego and José Loiola (BRA) | Men's FIVB Beach Volley World Tour Winner alongside (Brazil) Zé Marco de Melo; 2000 | Succeeded by Emanuel Rego and Tande Ramos (BRA) |
| Preceded by Martín Conde and Mariano Baracetti (ARG) | Men's FIVB Beach Volley World Tour Winner alongside (Brazil) Emanuel Rego; 2003–2007 | Succeeded by Pedro Solberg Salgado and Harley Marques (BRA) |
Awards
| Preceded by Inaugural | Men's FIVB World Tour "Best Hitter"; 2005 | Succeeded by Emanuel Rego (BRA) |
| Preceded by Inaugural | Men's FIVB World Tour "Best Attacker"; 2005–2007 | Succeeded by Phil Dalhausser (USA) |
| Preceded by Inaugural | Men's FIVB World Tour "Most Outstanding"; 2005 | Succeeded by Emanuel Rego (BRA) |
| Preceded by Emanuel Rego (BRA) | Men's FIVB World Tour "Most Outstanding"; 2007 | Succeeded by Harley Marques (BRA) |
| Preceded by Inaugural | Men's FIVB World Tour "Team of the Year" alongside (Brazil) Emanuel Rego; 2005–2007 | Succeeded by Pedro Solberg Salgado and Harley Marques (BRA) |
