= Iver Horrem =

Norwegian beach volleyball player (born 1977)

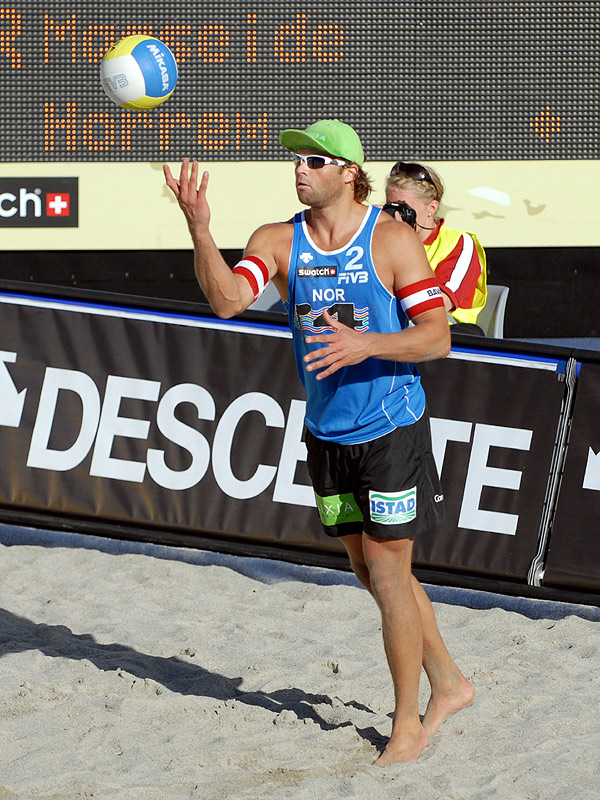

Personal information
- Full name: Iver Andreas Horrem
- Nationality: Norwegian
- Born: 1 January 1977 (age 49); Aukra Municipality, Norway
- Hometown: Stavanger, Norway
- Height: 6 ft 3 in (1.91 m)

Beach volleyball information

Current teammate
Years	Teammate
2007–present	Bjørn Maaseide

Previous teammates
Years	Teammate
2001–2004; 2005–2006	Bjørn Maaseide; Bård Inge Pettersen
- Last updated: 25 June 2009

Iver Andreas Horrem (born 1 January 1977 in Aukra Municipality) is a Norwegian professional beach volleyball player from Norway, best known as Bjørn Maaseide's teammate. He also plays volleyball for Kristiansund VBK.

== Playing career ==
=== Career start ===
Horrem has played on a professional level since 1999. He first became Bjørn Maaseide's teammate when Maaseide's former partner Jan Kvalheim retired after the 2000 Summer Olympics in Sydney. Horrem og Maaseide played four seasons together (2001–2004), with four 5. place finishes in the World Tour as their best result. The duo also came fifth in the 2004 European Championships and ended their career together with a 19th place in the 2004 Summer Olympics in Athens.

=== New partner ===
When Maaseide retired after the 2004 Summer Olympics, Horrem played two seasons with Bård Inge Pettersen. They achieved two fifth-place finishes in the World Tour as their best result.

=== Maaseide's comeback ===
In the winter of 2007, Horrem og Pettersen split up and Horrem challenged Maaseide to a comeback. After some consideration, Maaseide decided to start playing again. The reunited duo made their debut in a World Tour competition in Shanghai, and finished with a thirteenth place.

== Playing partners ==
- Bjørn Maaseide (2001–2004)
- Bård Inge Pettersen (2005–2006)
- Bjørn Maaseide (2007–present)

Awards
Preceded by Conrad Leinemann (CAN)	Men's FIVB Beach World Tour "Best Server"; 2006	Succeeded by Igor Kolodinsky (RUS)
