= Rogério Ferreira =

Brazilian beach volleyball player (born 1973)

Personal information
- Full name: Rogério de Souza Ferreira
- Nickname: Pará
- Born: September 13, 1973 (age 53); Belém, Brazil
- Height: 6 ft 3 in (191 cm)
Honours
Men's beach volleyball
Representing Brazil
World Championships
Gold medal – first place	1997 Los Angeles	Beach
Bronze medal – third place	1999 Marseille	Beach

Rogério "Pará" de Souza Ferreira (born September 13, 1973 in Belém) is a male former beach volleyball player from Brazil. He won the gold medal at the 1997 World Championships in Los Angeles, California, partnering with Guilherme Marques. Two years later, they both claimed the bronze medal at the World Championships in Marseille, France.

Sporting positions
Preceded by Emanuel Rego and Zé Marco de Melo (BRA)	Men's FIVB Beach Volley World Tour Winner alongside (Brazil) Guilherme Marques; 1998	Succeeded by Emanuel Rego and José Loiola (BRA)
