= Paulo Emilio Silva =

Brazilian beach volleyball player (born 1969)

Personal information
- Full name: Paulo Emilio Silva Azevedo
- Born: December 14, 1969 (age 56); Salvador, Brazil
- Height: 6 ft 3 in (191 cm)
Honours
Men's beach volleyball
Representing Brazil
World Championships
Bronze medal – third place	1997 Los Angeles	Beach
Pan American Games
Silver medal – second place	2003 Santo Domingo	Beach

Paulo Emilio Silva Azevedo (born December 14, 1969, in Salvador) is a male beach volleyball player from Brazil. He won the silver medal in the men's beach team competition at the 2003 Pan American Games in Santo Domingo, Dominican Republic, partnering Luizão Correa.
