= Side Out =

1990 film by Peter Israelson

- Theatrical release poster
- Directed by: Peter Israelson
- Written by: David Thoreau
- Produced by: Gary Foster; Russ Krasnoff; Jay Weston; John Zane
- Starring: C. Thomas Howell; Peter Horton; Courtney Thorne-Smith; Harley Jane Kozak; Christopher Rydell
- Cinematography: Ron Garcia
- Edited by: Conrad Buff IV
- Music by: Jeff Lorber
- Production company: Aurora Productions
- Distributed by: Tri-Star Pictures
- Release date: March 30, 1990
- Running time: 100 minutes
- Country: United States
- Language: English
- Budget: $6 million
- Box office: $450,000

Side Out is a 1990 American comedy-drama sports film about a beach volleyball competition, featuring C. Thomas Howell, Peter Horton, Harley Jane Kozak and Courtney Thorne-Smith. It was the last film from Aurora Productions due to many flops. The film was directed by Peter Israelson.

Many professional beach volleyball players appeared in the movie, such as 5-time world champion Randy Stoklos (who had the main speaking role of all the players as Rollo Vincent); Sinjin Smith (as Stoklos' playing partner/character Billy Cross) who won 5 world championships with Stoklos and was the 1st player to reach 100 wins; Olympic gold medalist Kent Steffes; Steve Timmons, who won 2 Olympic gold medals in indoor volleyball; Mike Dodd, 5-time Manhattan Beach Open champion, 75 pro wins and an Olympic silver medal; Tim Hovland, 3-time All-American at USC and won $1 million in pro prize money; also Steve Obradovich (who also had a generous speaking part), Craig Moothart, Brent Frohoff, Ricci Luyties, Roger Clark, Pono Ma'a, Wally Goodrich, and Rudy Dvorak.

The term “side-out” used to refer to an obsolete scoring rule in volleyball called "side-out scoring" under which the winning point could only be scored by the serving team. A side-out is now simply defined as when the receiving team earns the right to serve by winning a point. Rally scoring became the dominant scoring method as of 1999, which gives a point to whichever team wins a rally, whether serving or not. This method allowed for a more predictable match length and increased fan interest and shorter games.

== Plot ==
Monroe Clark moves to California to pursue a law career. At the airport, he meets Wiley Hunter, who offers him a ride to the home of Monroe's uncle Max, who assigns Monroe the job of handing homeowners a "pay or quit" notice to either to vacate the premises or pay past rent due and to be back by 6 o'clock.

Monroe handles some of the evictions until, attempting to serve Zack Barnes with his eviction notice, he meets a British flight attendant who Zack has just had a sexual fling with. Monroe is then led to Zack's gambling bookmaker, who throws Monroe's suitcase into the ocean. Monroe then meets Samantha, who recovered his suitcase from the ocean. He also runs into Wiley, who shows Monroe the joys of living a carefree lifestyle and the popularity of beach volleyball.

Wiley asks a volleyball team of Moothart and O'Bradovich to challenge the duo to a quick game. Monroe forgets his deadline for the evictions. Uncle Max sees through Monroe's lie and tells Monroe he would pardon his mistake if he successfully evicts Zack Barnes out of his home. In a bar, Monroe reunites with Samantha and (with the help of Wiley) finds Zack and tries to hand him the eviction notice, but Zack's former volleyball partner Rollo Vincent teases Zack and a bar fight ensues.

Samantha, watching the fight, is invited by Monroe to a date at a "friend's" house (without telling Samantha that it is actually his uncle's). The two share a romantic date until Max reveals he is Monroe's uncle and angers Samantha because Monroe lied to her. Monroe and Wiley hang out at the beaches and try to get better at volleyball by practicing routines and exercising while Monroe tries to apologize to Samantha, who is avoiding him.

Wiley tells Monroe that he entered them in a volleyball tournament, where they lose in the first round. Zack, a spectator, offers to coach the two to teach techniques Zack used when he was the "king of the beach" (the title now belongs to Rollo). Each day until the Gold Cuervo Classic, the team trains. Zack fails to show up (because he was having sex with his ex-wife Kate Jacobs). The duo challenge Rollo and his partner Billy Cross to a quick match. During the match Monroe and Wiley fail to use teamwork in the game and results in Wiley having a broken arm. Monroe becomes angered at Zack for not being there for coaching and vows to evict Zack in court (after attempting to dump his records).

In court, Monroe at first testifies against Zack and pleading judgment for his side, but then supports Zack after Monroe decided to pursue his own dreams rather than law school. In doing so Max's boss threatens him with negligence and kicks Monroe out for defending Zack. After Monroe leaves Max's house, Zack offers him a place while training him for the Gold Cuervo Classic volleyball tournament. While doing so, Monroe apologizes to Wiley for his selfishness and they reconcile as well as Samantha for lying to her.

Monroe asks why Zack lost his title to Rollo and Zack explains that in the days when they were a team, the duo reached the championship. Zack's agents told him to lose to earn more money but Zack feared his involvement and when the championship arrived, he never came. Each day they trained until the big day finally came for the Gold Cuervo Classic tournament. Monroe and Zack are first up against Moothart and Obradovich, and they near their loss until Zack tells Monroe to use a technique Zack taught Monroe to win the first round. They beat the team and the duo advance to the championship after multiple victories.

Before the championship Zack gets into an argument with Kate telling him to lose to Rollo. As Monroe watches he fears Zack will make the same mistake he made with Rollo many years ago. As they announce the names of the contestants Zack fails to show up and Monroe is scared Zack abandoned him. In a few minutes Zack appears and the game begins but Monroe and Zack lose many points because of Zack not focusing and the team argue. Monroe then gets Zack back in the game and they win the championship thus making Zack and Monroe rich and Rollo and Billy lose. The film ends with a freeze-frame of Monroe and Zack in their victory pose.

== Cast ==
- C. Thomas Howell as Monroe Clark
- Peter Horton as Zack Barnes
- Courtney Thorne-Smith as Samantha
- Harley Jane Kozak as Kate Jacobs
- Christopher Rydell as Wiley Hunter
- Terry Kiser as Uncle Max
- Randy Stoklos as Rollo Vincent
- Sinjin Smith as Billy Cross
- Tony Burton as Louie
- Kathy Ireland as Marie
- Martha Velez as Mrs. Salazar
- Felicity Waterman as flight attendant

== Release ==
The film was released in cinemas on March 30, 1990 in the United States and came to VHS and LaserDisc later that year. Overseas, the film was straight-to-video.

It was released on DVD in 2004 and reissued as a print-on-demand in 2014. In December 2021, a Blu-ray remaster of the film was announced for release on February 22, 2022.
