= Greg Lee (basketball) =

American basketball and volleyball player (1951–2022)

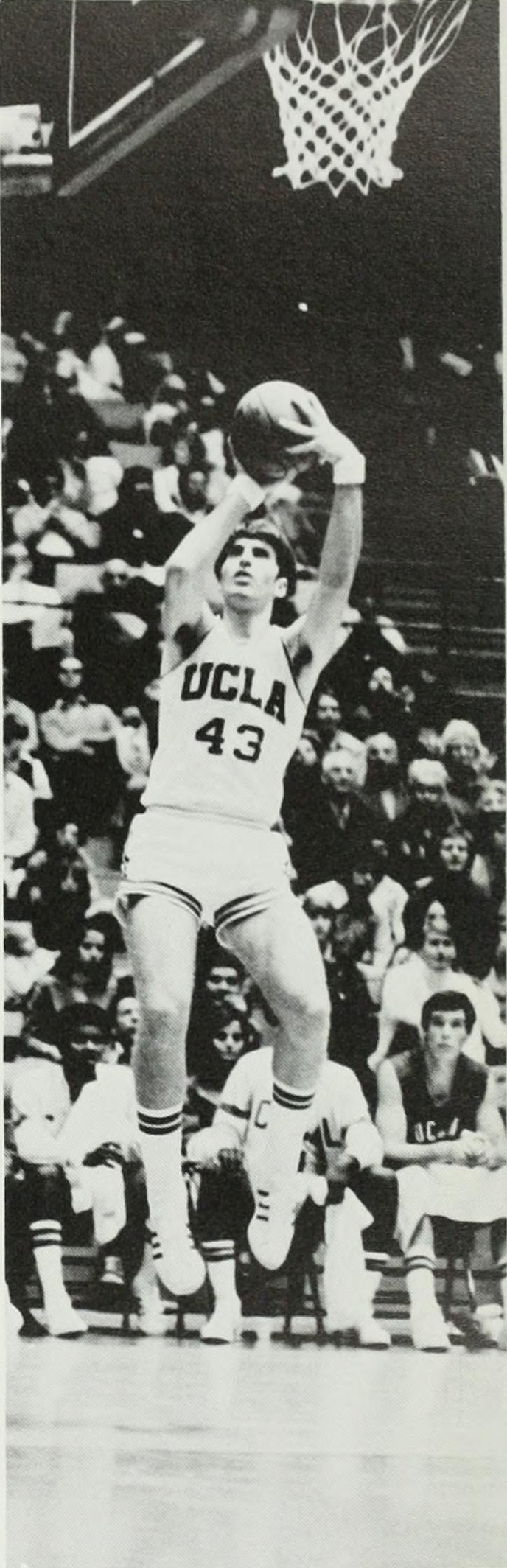
- Lee shooting with the UCLA Bruins in 1972–73

Personal information
- Born: December 12, 1951 Los Angeles, California, U.S.
- Died: September 21, 2022 (aged 70) San Diego, California, U.S.
- Listed height: 6 ft 3 in (1.91 m)
- Listed weight: 190 lb (86 kg)

Career information
- High school: Reseda (Reseda, California)
- College: UCLA (1971–1974)
- NBA draft: 1974: 7th round, 115th overall pick
- Drafted by: Atlanta Hawks
- Playing career: 1974–1980
- Position: Point guard
- Number: 2, 42

Career history
- 1974–1975: San Diego Conquistadors
- 1975–1976: Portland Trail Blazers
- 1977–1980: TuS 04 Leverkusen

Career highlights
- 2× NCAA champion (1972, 1973)

Career ABA & NBA statistics
- Points: 24 (2.4 ppg)
- Rebounds: 5 (0.5 rpg)
- Assists: 24 (2.4 apg)
- Stats at NBA.com
- Stats at Basketball Reference

Gregory Scott Lee (December 12, 1951 – September 21, 2022) was an American professional basketball and volleyball player. He played college basketball for the UCLA Bruins, winning back-to-back national championships as their starting point guard in 1972 and 1973. He had short stints in the original American Basketball Association (ABA) and the National Basketball Association (NBA) before playing four seasons in West Germany. As a volleyball player, Lee teamed with Jim Menges to set a record with 13 consecutive professional beach volleyball titles. He was inducted into the California Beach Volleyball Association's (CBVA) hall of fame.

== Early life ==
Lee was born in the Reseda neighborhood of Los Angeles on December 12, 1951. His father, Marvin, played center for the UCLA Bruins under coach Wilbur Johns. Lee attended Reseda Charter High School, where he was an All-American and twice was named Los Angeles City Section player of the year in basketball.

== Basketball career ==
Lee played point guard at the University of California, Los Angeles, from 1971 to 1974. When he arrived, freshmen were not allowed to compete on the varsity team. He played on the freshman team with Bill Walton and Keith Wilkes (later known as Jamaal Wilkes), and they went undefeated with a 20–0 record. In his sophomore year, Lee became a starter on the varsity squad. He and his classmates went on the 1971–72 Bruins squad and had a record of 30–0, winning its games by an average margin of over 30 points. Lee averaged 8.7 points per game, while Wilkes averaged 13.5 points and Walton 21.1. UCLA won the national title in 1972 over Florida State 81–76.

The following year, the Bruins again went 30–0, and again won the NCAA tournament with an 87–66 win over Memphis State. Lee's 14 assists in the game set an NCAA championship game record. He had started the season as a reserve after coach John Wooden replaced him in the starting lineup with Tommy Curtis. However, Curtis became ill with the London flu after 10 games. Lee re-established himself as the starter, and Curtis became a key reserve.

In Lee's senior year in 1973–74, Curtis became a starter again, and Andre McCarter's improved play also cut into Lee's playing time. The school's 88-game winning streak ended with a 71–70 loss to Notre Dame. The streak remains an NCAA men's basketball record. Later that season, UCLA's stretch of consecutive national titles was stopped at seven after North Carolina State defeated the Bruins 80–77 in double overtime in the semifinals of the NCAA tournament. In his 2016 autobiography, Walton blamed Curtis for both the tournament loss as well as earlier defeats in the season, and lamented Lee's lack of playing time. During his collegiate career, Lee was named a three-time academic All-American.

After his collegiate career ended, Lee was drafted by both the NBA and ABA. The Atlanta Hawks drafted him in the seventh round (115th pick overall) of the 1974 NBA draft and the San Diego Conquistadors drafted him in the fifth round of the ABA draft the same year. He chose the Conquistadors, averaging 3.6 points and 2.6 assists in five games. The next season, he moved to the NBA, joining Walton on the Portland Trail Blazers and averaging 1.2 points and 2.2 assists in five games. At the urging of former UCLA player John Ecker, Lee then played in West Germany for four seasons with TuS 04 Leverkusen.

== Beach volleyball career ==
Lee did not play volleyball for UCLA. However, his older brother Jon was an accomplished beach volleyball player with a "AAA" rating. Jon introduced him to the game. Lee began playing in the sand courts at Sorrento Beach in 1970.

Lee played in his first open at the Laguna Beach Open in 1972, finishing second with Ron Von Hagen. His first open victory was with Tom Chamales at the 1972 Santa Barbara Open. Lee reached the finals four times that year, winning twice. It was in Santa Monica in 1972 that Lee met what came to be his longtime beach partner Jim Menges. The pair of Lee and Menges won their first open tournament together at the 1973 Marine Street Open, defeating Ron Lang and Von Hagen in the finals. The two were partners on and off over the summers of the next two seasons while Menges completed his volleyball career at UCLA and Lee played professional basketball for a couple of years. Lee's best finish on the beach in 1974 was a second at the Manhattan Beach Open.

Starting in 1975, Lee and Menges began playing together full-time, and the two had a dominant run. They reached the finals of 10 events, winning all but one. In the mid-1970s, the beach volleyball tour consisted of 12 tournaments, all played at beaches along the California coast, from Santa Cruz in the north to San Diego in the south. Lee and Menges dominated the events, winning the final seven events of the 1975 season and the first six in 1976 to string together 13 tournament wins in a row. The record stood for 16 years until tied by the pairing of Karch Kiraly and Kent Steffes. Lee and Menges had become the most dominant pairing in beach volleyball.

On the 1977 tour, Lee advanced to the finals three times, winning all of them. In 1978, he reached five finals, winning four times. Lee also won the 1981 Laguna Beach Open with Jay Hanseth. In 1981, Lee and Menges won their last open title, at the Mission Beach Open in San Diego. In total Lee won 25 tournaments with his partner Menges, which places the pair at No. 6 on the all-time list of wins for a team.

Lee's greatest success on the beach came when teaming with Menges. They were considered the kings of the beach in the mid- to late 1970s. From 1973 to 1982, Lee and Menges played in 30 tournaments together, winning 25, finishing second three times and third twice. They were never out of the top three. The pair also won pro beach volleyball's first World Championship in 1976. Following a loss that stopped Kiraly and Steffes from breaking the tour record of 13 tournament championships in a row set in 1975–76 by Lee and Menges, Kiraly said: "I guess it's appropriate that Menges and Lee stay in the record book. They laid the foundation for the sport."

Lee scored additional victories with Hagen and Hanseth. In 1977, he left the sand to play professional basketball in Europe, returning to Southern California two years later. He entered a total of 62 opens, reaching the finals 39 times while collecting 29 tournament titles. He was inducted into the CBVA Beach Volleyball Hall of Fame in 1997.

== Personal life ==
Lee and wife Lisa were married for 48 years and had two children: Ethan and Jessamyn. Following his athletic career, Lee and his family settled in San Diego. He taught mathematics at Morse High School and coached the girls junior varsity team for two years and was an assistant coach on the boys' varsity team. In 1985, he became the varsity boys coach at Clairemont High, where he continued teaching math and also coached tennis.

Lee faced health problems after a failed back surgery in 1998. He died on September 21, 2022, at a hospital in San Diego. He was 70 and suffered from an infection linked to an immune disorder.
