= Mônica Rodrigues =

Brazilian volleyball player (born 1967)

Personal information
- Born: September 20, 1967 (age 59); Rio de Janeiro, Brazil
- Height: 180 cm (5 ft 11 in)
Honours
Women's beach volleyball
Representing Brazil
Olympic Games
| Silver medal – second place | 1996 Atlanta | Beach |
Goodwill Games
| Silver medal – second place | 1994 St. Petersburg | Beach |

Mônica Rodrigues (born September 20, 1967) is a Brazilian retired female volleyball player. She won the silver medal in the inaugural women's beach volleyball tournament at the 1996 Summer Olympics, partnering with Adriana Samuel. She played for eleven years in the FIVB, and collected six titles and $415,000 in prizes.

Sporting positions
| Preceded by Liz Masakayan and Karolyn Kirby (USA) | Women's FIVB Beach World Tour Winner alongside (Brazil) Adriana Samuel; 1994 | Succeeded by Jackie Silva and Sandra Pires (BRA) |
