= Karolyn Kirby =

American beach volleyball player

Personal information
- Born: June 30, 1961 (age 65); Brookline, Massachusetts, U.S.
- Height: 5 ft 11 in (1.80 m)
- Education: Utah State University

Volleyball information
- Position: Setter / Outside hitter
- Number: 8 (national team)

National team
| 1986 | United States |
Medal record
Women's beach volleyball
Representing the United States
World Championships
| Bronze medal – third place | 1997 Los Angeles | Beach |
Goodwill Games
| Gold medal – first place | 1994 St. Petersburg | Beach |
Women's volleyball
Representing the United States
Goodwill Games
| Bronze medal – third place | 1986 Moscow | Indoor |

Karolyn Kirby (born June 30, 1961) is an American female retired beach volleyball player. She won the bronze medal at the 1997 World Championships in Los Angeles, California, partnering with Nancy Reno. The pair also won the 1992 Olympic tournament, at which time beach volleyball was a demonstration sport.

In her career in beach volleyball, Kirby won 67 tournaments and $680,000 in prizes. 29 of her tournament wins were with partner Liz Masakayan.

Kirby won numerous awards as a beach volleyball player. She was WPVA Most Valuable Player in 1990, 1991, 1993, and 1994. She was WPVA Best Offensive Player in 1990 and WPVA Best Hitter in 1992. She was WPVA Best Setter in 1991, 1993, 1994, 1995, 1996, and 1997.

In 2004, Kirby was inducted into the International Volleyball Hall of Fame.

== College ==
Kirby was twice an AIAW volleyball All-American at Utah State University (USU), leading the Aggies to consecutive top 10 national finishes from 1979 to 1981. Kirby helped USU to a combined record of 106–38 (.736) over the three years that she played for the school, including a second-place finish in the 1979 AIAW Nationals at 35–5. Additionally, Kirby was twice an Intermountain All-Conference selection (1980–81).

Kirby was inducted into the Utah State University Hall of Fame in 1995.

== National team ==
Kirby was briefly on the United States women's national volleyball team in 1986, and was a teammate of Masakayan.

== Awards ==
- Two-time AIAW All-American
- Goodwill Games bronze medal (indoor) 1986
- Utah State University Hall of Fame 1995
- Four-time WPVA Most Valuable Player 1990, 1991, 1993, 1994
- WPVA Best Offensive Player 1990
- WPVA Best Hitter 1992
- Six-time WPVA Best Setter 1991, 1993, 1994, 1995, 1996, 1997
- Goodwill Games gold medal (beach) 1994
- World Championships bronze medal 1997
- International Volleyball Hall of Fame 2004

Sporting positions
| Preceded by Inaugural | Women's FIVB Beach World Tour Winner alongside (United States) Nancy Reno; 1992 | Succeeded by Liz Masakayan and Karolyn Kirby (USA) |
| Preceded by Nancy Reno and Karolyn Kirby (USA) | Women's FIVB Beach World Tour Winner alongside (United States) Liz Masakayan; 1993 | Succeeded by Adriana Samuel and Mônica Rodrigues (BRA) |
