= Franco Neto =

Brazilian beach volleyball player (born 1966)

Personal information
- Full name: Franco José Vieira Neto
- Born: November 11, 1966 (age 59); Fortaleza, Ceará, Brazil
- Height: 6 ft 4 in (193 cm)

Beach volleyball information
Teammate
Roberto Lopes
Honours
Men's beach volleyball
Representing Brazil
Pan American Games
Bronze medal – third place	1999 Winnipeg	Beach

Franco José Vieira Neto (born November 11, 1966, in Fortaleza, Ceará) is a former beach volleyball player from Brazil who won the bronze medal in the men's beach team competition at the 1999 Pan American Games in Winnipeg, Manitoba, Canada, partnering with Roberto Lopes. He represented his native country at the 1996 Summer Olympics in Atlanta, Georgia.

Sporting positions
Preceded by Sinjin Smith and Randy Stoklos (USA)	Men's FIVB Beach Volley World Tour Winner alongside (Brazil) Roberto Lopes; 1993	Succeeded by Jan Kvalheim and Bjørn Maaseide (NOR)
Preceded by Jan Kvalheim and Bjørn Maaseide (NOR)	Men's FIVB Beach Volley World Tour Winner alongside (Brazil) Roberto Lopes; 1995	Succeeded by Emanuel Rego and Zé Marco de Melo (BRA)
Awards
Preceded by Mark Heese (CAN)	Men's FIVB World Tour "Most Inspirational"; 2006–2007	Succeeded by Todd Rogers (USA)
Preceded by Emanuel Rego (BRA)	Men's FIVB World Tour "Sportsperson"; 2006–2007	Succeeded by Phil Dalhausser (USA)
