= Angela Rock =

American volleyball athlete and coach (born 1963)

Angela Terese Rock (born October 15, 1963) is a former Olympic volleyball player. She was born in California. Angela was a collegiate athlete at San Diego State University and became an Olympic volleyball athlete in 1988. Along with the Olympics, she participated in the 1977 Pan American games, the Goodwill Games, the Women's Professional Volleyball Association (WPVA), and the Federation De International Volleyball tours. Angela won 27 beach volleyball events, and in 1991 she was named the Women's Professional Volleyball Associations top hitter. After her Olympic and professional volleyball career, she became a coach and an author.

== Before and During Olympic life ==
=== Early life ===
Angela Rock fell in love with the idea of being an Olympian as a junior at El Toro High School despite not initially being interested in team sports. In high school, she was a multi-sport athlete including basketball, volleyball, track, and softball. When the Olympic volleyball coach, Arlie Serlinger, hosted a practice with two El Toro players, Rock joined them. After a successful high school season, San Diego State offered her a scholarship to play indoor volleyball.

=== Collegiate Life and Journey to the Olympics ===
Angela was a student-athlete at San Diego State University as a member of the Volleyball team that made ranked in the Final Four in 1981 and 1982. By her junior year, her attitude resulted in her cut from the team. She rejoined the team her senior year. In 1984, Rock ended her senior year tying a school record of 81 serving aces and 752 kills and was named a First Team All-American in her collegiate league. She was inducted into the University's Hall of Fame. Rock graduated with a B.A. in Psychology. In December 1984, she began to train for the American Beach National Team for February 1985 tryouts. She made the team of 13 players and was named the MVP her first year. She participated in indoor volleyball in the 1988 Games in Seoul, South Korea where America ranked 7th. Rock received a Masters in Physical Education at National University and a Masters in Education from Azusa Pacific University.

== After Olympic life ==
After a successful 30 years of volleyball, Angela retired in 2000 to become a coach, educator, and an author.

=== Author ===
Angela shared her experience in the book Angela Rock's Advanced Beach Volleyball Tactics, a guide to both indoor and outdoor volleyball. The book topics include warm ups outside the physical court, responsibilities of a setter, effective blocking, and defense strategies.

=== Coaching and career ===
Rock was the head coach at The University of Alaska Fairbanks, Cuyamaca college, UC Santa Barbara, Southwestern Community College in San Diego, Saint Mary's College in Morago, CA and the San Diego State University Men's volleyball team. She was an Olympic coach in 1996 for Holly McPeak and Nancy Reno. She currently works in education management.

== Achievements ==
- 1981– National Collegiate Athletic Association Final Four member
- 1982– National Collegiate Athletic Association Final Four member
- 1984– San Diego State University most valuable player
- 1984– Named a First Team All American
- 1985– USA Volleyball most valuable player
- 1987– Pan American Games Silver medal recipient
- 1991– Named Women's Professional Volleyball Association tour's best hitter
- 1992– Almeria Spain Beach Exhibition Olympics Silver Medal recipient
- 1993– Association of Volleyball Professionals Tour champion and Inducted into Beach Volleyball Hall of Fame
