= Roberto Lopes da Costa =

Brazilian beach volleyball player (born 1966)

Roberto Lopes

Personal information
- Full name: Roberto Lopes da Costa
- Born: October 6, 1966 (age 60); Bacabal, Maranhão, Brazil
- Height: 6 ft 1 in (185 cm)

Beach volleyball information
Teammate
Franco Neto
Honours
Men's beach volleyball
Representing Brazil
Pan American Games
| Bronze medal – third place | 1999 Winnipeg | Beach |

Roberto Lopes da Costa (born October 6, 1966, in Bacabal, Maranhão) is a former beach volleyball player from Brazil. He won the bronze medal in the men's beach team competition at the 1999 Pan American Games in Winnipeg, Manitoba, Canada, partnering with Franco Neto. He represented his native country at the 1996 Summer Olympics in Atlanta, Georgia.

Sporting positions
| Preceded by Sinjin Smith and Randy Stoklos (USA) | Men's FIVB Beach Volley World Tour Winner alongside (Brazil) Franco Neto; 1993 | Succeeded by Jan Kvalheim and Bjørn Maaseide (NOR) |
| Preceded by Jan Kvalheim and Bjørn Maaseide (NOR) | Men's FIVB Beach Volley World Tour Winner alongside (Brazil) Franco Neto; 1995 | Succeeded by Emanuel Rego and Zé Marco de Melo (BRA) |
