= Jon Lee (volleyball player) =

American volleyball player and journalist

Jon Lee (born 1949) is an American indoor and beach volleyball player, coach, and journalist. He won a national championship indoors in 1969 at the University of California, Santa Barbara (UCSB) where he was a three time All-American. After graduating from UCSB, Lee played professional indoor volleyball with the Santa Barbara Spikers ('75) and with Son Amar in Spain ('74, '75), including winning the Spanish National Championship in Mallorca ('74).

== Playing career ==
Lee began playing beach volleyball at age 10, competed throughout high school and college, won his AAA two-man rating on the beach in 1971, and maintained that rating for well over a decade. Between 1971 and 1983 he teamed with three-time Olympic gold medalist Karch Kiraly; former Stanford men's and women's volleyball coach Don Shaw; NBA player, basketball All-American; and pro volleyball player Greg Lee, AVP Pro John Hanley; and many others. In 2015, he won the 60+ Sand National Championship for the third consecutive year and has won 10 other age-level titles at the annual Motherlode Volleyball Classic in Aspen.

== Journalism ==
After finishing his professional volleyball career, Lee become a writer and Senior Editor for Volleyball Magazine, the world's first volleyball publication. He covered Olympic, Pan American and World Championship competition around the world and authored over 100 articles about the sport. He also worked as an ESPN color commentator on television, covering beach doubles and four-man tournaments as well as NCAA and professional indoor matches.

== Coaching career ==
For 23 years Lee was an indoor coach at San Marcos High School in Santa Barbara, California, where he also taught writing and English. He coached 46 consecutive seasons of both the boys and girls volleyball for the Royals, from 1986 to 2009, while also mixing in stints as an assistant coach for three seasons at Westmont College and one at UCSB. His high school boys and girls volleyball teams both won CIF (Southern California) Championships and many collegiate and Olympic stars emerged from his programs, including U.S. Beach Volleyball Gold Medalist Todd Rogers, AVP Professional Dax Holdren, U.S. National Volleyball team members Brook Billings and Jeff Menzel, and West Coast Conference First Team player Mandy Bible among others. He was named CIF Coach of the Year three times. 52 of Lee's players have gone on to become volleyball coaches. In 2009, San Marcos High School honored Coach Lee by naming the Lee Court in the new gymnasium in his honor. In 2013, the City of Santa Barbara Park and Recreation Department, local media and the Semana Nautica Association awarded Jon the R.F. MacFarland Memorial Trophy for his 22 years of service to youth. In 2017, Jon was inducted into the Santa Barbara Athletic Round Table Hall of Fame.

== Personal life ==
Lee's younger brother Greg was also a pro volleyball player after his career in basketball.
