= Anjinho Bacil =

Brazilian volleyball player (born 1971)

Personal information
- Full name: Eduardo Jorge Bacil Filho
- Nickname: Anjinho
- Born: March 11, 1971 (age 55)
- Hometown: Rio de Janeiro, Brazil
- Height: 6 ft 2 in (188 cm)
- Education: Estácio de Sá University

National team
1988–1992	Brazil

Eduardo Jorge "Anjinho" Bacil Filho (born March 11, 1971) is a Brazilian former indoor volleyball and beach volleyball player.

== Career ==
Anjinho played with the Brazilian national volleyball team from 1988 to 1992.

Anjinho was the first Brazilian and the first foreign player ever to win an Association of Volleyball Professionals (AVP) tournament in America. He won his first AVP title in 1995 in Washington, DC, partnering with José Loiola. In 2001, he earned his first title with partner Scott Ayakatubby at the Huntington Beach Open. In his career, he won $580,000 in prizes as a beach volleyball player.

Fellow AVP alumnus Stein Metzger has given Anjinho credit for inventing the "Steino pokey shot".

== Coaching ==
Since his retirement, Anjinho has offered beach volleyball coaching clinics to youth. He has also coached volleyball at El Segundo High School in El Segundo, California.

== Personal life ==
Eduardo Jorge Bacil Filho is his full name, but his nickname is "Anjinho", which is Portuguese for "little angel". He is from Copacabana Beach, Rio de Janeiro, Brazil. Anjinho has three children.
