= Emanuel Rego =

Brazilian beach volleyball player

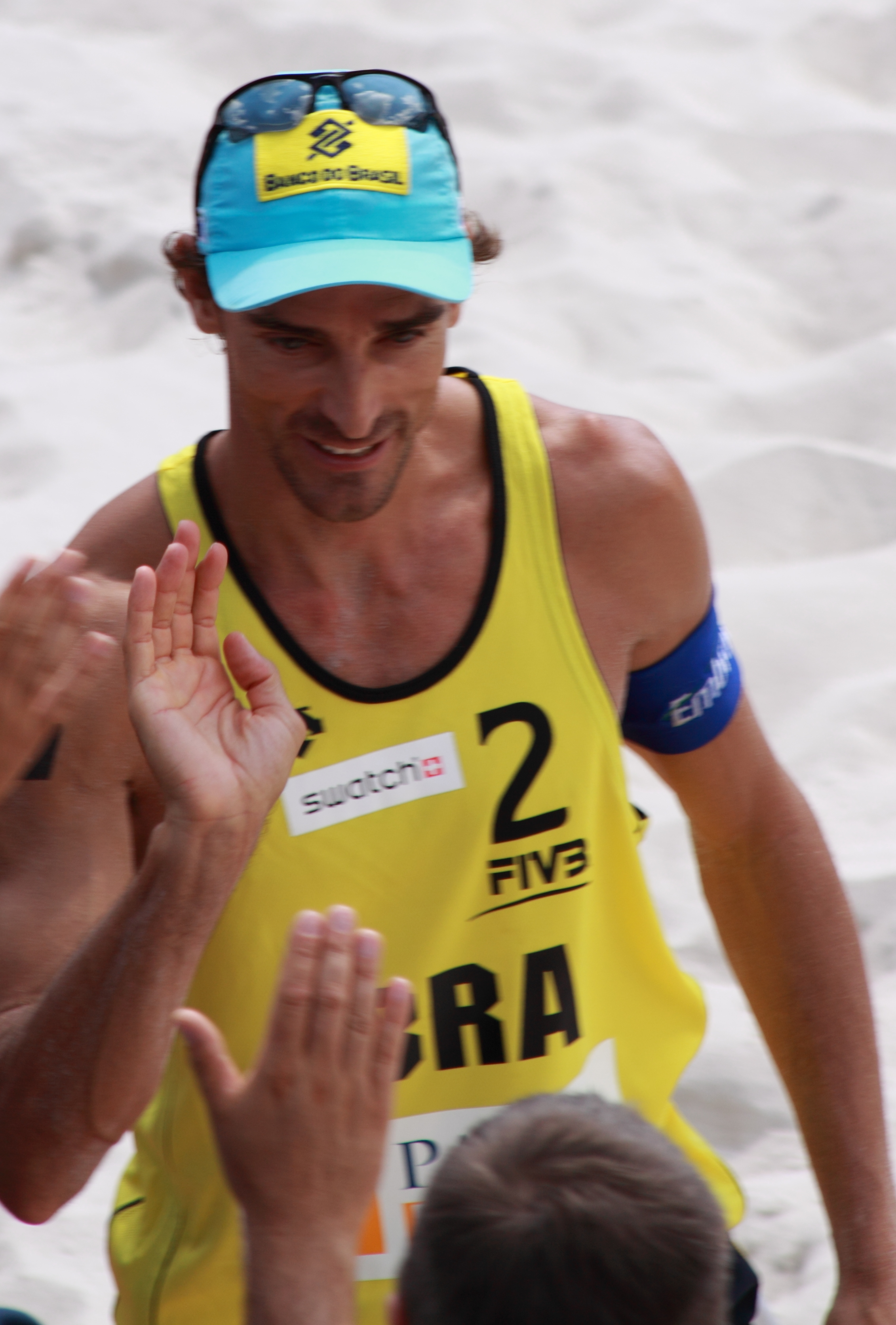

Personal information
- Full name: Emanuel Fernando Sheffer Rego
- Born: 15 April 1973 (age 53); Curitiba, Brazil
- Height: 190 cm (6 ft 3 in)
Honours
Men's beach volleyball
Representing Brazil
Olympic Games
Gold medal – first place	2004 Athens	Beach
Silver medal – second place	2012 London	Beach
Bronze medal – third place	2008 Beijing	Beach
World Championships
Gold medal – first place	1999 Marseille	Beach
Gold medal – first place	2003 Rio de Janeiro	Beach
Gold medal – first place	2011 Rome	Beach
Pan American Games
Gold medal – first place	2007 Rio de Janeiro	Beach
Gold medal – first place	2011 Guadalajara	Beach

Emanuel Fernando Sheffer Rego (born 15 April 1973) is a Brazilian male former beach volleyball player who competed in five consecutive Summer Olympics, starting in 1996. Rego partnered with José Loiola at the 2000 Summer Olympics in Sydney, though they did not medal. He won the gold medal in the men's beach team competition at the 2004 Summer Olympics in Athens, partnering with Ricardo Santos. He won the bronze medal at the 2008 Summer Olympics in Beijing and the silver medal at the 2012 Summer Olympics in London.

In 2016, Rego was inducted into the International Volleyball Hall of Fame. He was the Brazilian flagbearer at the 2016 Summer Olympics in Rio de Janeiro.

Rego famously offered his medal to his compatriot Vanderlei de Lima – who won the bronze in the men's marathon after being attacked by Neil Horan – a year later, though it was politely declined.

== Personal life ==
Rego was born in Curitiba, and is married (2013) to volleyball Olympic medallist and Senator Leila Barros.

Sporting positions
Preceded by Roberto Lopes and Franco Neto (BRA)	Men's FIVB Beach Volley World Tour Winner alongside (Brazil) Zé Marco de Melo; 1996–1997	Succeeded by Guilherme Marques and Rogério Ferreira (BRA)
Preceded by Guilherme Marques and Rogério Ferreira (BRA)	Men's FIVB Beach Volley World Tour Winner alongside (Brazil) José Loiola; 1999	Succeeded by Ricardo Santos and Zé Marco de Melo (BRA)
Preceded by Ricardo Santos and Zé Marco de Melo (BRA)	Men's FIVB Beach Volley World Tour Winner alongside (Brazil) Tande Ramos; 2001	Succeeded by Martín Conde and Mariano Baracetti (ARG)
Preceded by Martín Conde and Mariano Baracetti (ARG)	Men's FIVB Beach Volley World Tour Winner alongside (Brazil) Ricardo Santos; 2003–2007	Succeeded by Pedro Solberg Salgado and Harley Marques (BRA)
Preceded by Phil Dalhausser and Todd Rogers (USA)	Men's FIVB Beach Volley World Tour Winner alongside (Brazil) Alison Cerutti; 2011	Succeeded by Jake Gibb and Sean Rosenthal (USA)
Awards
Preceded by Ricardo Santos (BRA)	Men's FIVB World Tour "Best Hitter"; 2006	Succeeded by Phil Dalhausser (USA)
Preceded by Xu Linyin (CHN)	Men's FIVB World Tour "Most Inspirational"; 2011–2012	Succeeded by Jake Gibb (USA)
Preceded by Jake Gibb (USA)	Men's FIVB World Tour "Most Inspirational"; 2015	Succeeded by Reinder Nummerdor (NED)
Preceded by Ricardo Santos (BRA)	Men's FIVB World Tour "Most Outstanding"; 2006	Succeeded by Ricardo Santos (BRA)
Preceded by Phil Dalhausser (USA)	Men's FIVB World Tour "Most Outstanding"; 2011	Succeeded by Sean Rosenthal (USA)
Preceded by Inaugural	Men's FIVB World Tour "Sportsperson"; 2005	Succeeded by Franco Neto (BRA)
Preceded by Rivo Vesik (EST)	Men's FIVB World Tour "Sportsperson"; 2010–2012	Succeeded by Jānis Šmēdiņš (LAT)
Preceded by Jānis Šmēdiņš (LAT)	Men's FIVB World Tour "Sportsperson"; 2014	Succeeded by Bruno Oscar Schmidt (BRA)
Preceded by Inaugural	Men's FIVB World Tour "Team of the Year" alongside (Brazil) Ricardo Santos; 2005–2007	Succeeded by Pedro Solberg Salgado and Harley Marques (BRA)
Preceded by Todd Rogers and Phil Dalhausser (USA)	Men's FIVB World Tour "Team of the Year" alongside (Brazil) Alison Cerutti; 2011	Succeeded by Jake Gibb and Sean Rosenthal (USA)
