= Zé Marco de Melo =

Brazilian volleyball player (born 1971)

Personal information
- Full name: José Marco Nóbrega Ferreira de Melo
- Nickname: Zé Marco
- Born: 19 March 1971 (age 55); João Pessoa, Paraíba, Brazil
- Height: 6 ft 3 in (1.91 m)
Honours
Men's beach volleyball
Representing Brazil
Olympic Games
Silver medal – second place	2000 Sydney	Beach

José Marco "Zé Marco" Nóbrega Ferreira de Melo (born 19 March 1971) is a former beach volleyball player from Brazil who won the silver medal in the men's beach team competition at the 2000 Summer Olympics in Sydney, Australia, partnering with Ricardo Santos. He also represented his native country at the 1996 Summer Olympics in Atlanta, Georgia.

Sporting positions
Preceded by Roberto Lopes and Franco Neto (BRA)	Men's FIVB Beach Volley World Tour Winner alongside (Brazil) Emanuel Rego; 1996–1997	Succeeded by Guilherme Marques and Rogério Ferreira (BRA)
Preceded by Emanuel Rego and José Loiola (BRA)	Men's FIVB Beach Volley World Tour Winner alongside (Brazil) Ricardo Santos; 2000	Succeeded by Emanuel Rego and Tande Ramos (BRA)
