= Jackie Silva =

Brazilian volleyball player

Jaqueline Silva OLY

Personal information
- Full name: Jaqueline Louise Cruz Silva
- Born: 13 February 1962 (age 64); Rio de Janeiro, Brazil
- Height: 1.70 m (5 ft 7 in)
- Weight: 63 kg (139 lb)

Volleyball information
- Position: Setter
- Number: 10

National team
1979–1985	Brazil
Honours
Women's beach volleyball
Representing Brazil
Olympic Games
Gold medal – first place	1996 Atlanta	Beach
World Championships
Gold medal – first place	1997 Los Angeles	Beach
Women's volleyball
Representing Brazil
Pan American Games
Bronze medal – third place	1979 San Juan	Indoor
CSV South American Championship
Silver medal – second place	1979 Rosario / Santa Fe	Indoor
Silver medal – second place	1983 São Paulo	Indoor

Jaqueline Louise Cruz Silva (born 13 February 1962) is a Brazilian retired female volleyball player. Silva won the gold medal in the inaugural women's beach volleyball tournament at the 1996 Summer Olympics in Atlanta, partnering with Sandra Pires.

Silva was first drafted by the Brazilian women's national volleyball team at the age of 14. She was part of the team that took Brazil to its first Olympics in Moscow in 1980, and then helped the team compete in the 1984 Olympics in Los Angeles. She was known for her aggressive temperament and concern for gender equality, which led the Confederação Brasileira de Voleibol to cut her from the national team in 1985.

In 2006, Silva was inducted into the International Volleyball Hall of Fame.

== Beach volleyball ==
In 1988, Silva went to the United States to become a beach volleyball player, with Linda Chisholm as her first partner. In 1993, she partnered with fellow Brazilian Sandra Pires, and together they won two world championships and the Olympic gold.

In 1994, Silva was the AVP Most Valuable Player. In her beach volleyball career, she won 60 tournaments and $644,000 in prizes.

== Coaching ==
Silva joined the Florida International University coaching staff as a volunteer assistant with the women's beach volleyball team under head coach Rita Crockett.

== Personal life ==
In 2009, Silva was designated UNESCO Champion of Sport.

At the 2016 Summer Olympics in Rio de Janeiro, Brazil, Silva was inducted into the Olympians for Life project for her work with the poor.

Silva is openly lesbian and has a relationship with the ballerina Amália Lima.

Sporting positions
Preceded by Adriana Samuel and Mônica Rodrigues (BRA)	Women's FIVB Beach World Tour Winner alongside (Brazil) Sandra Pires; 1995–1996	Succeeded by Adriana Behar and Shelda Bede (BRA)
