= Adam Johnson (volleyball) =

American beach volleyball player (born 1965)

Personal information
- Nickname: A.J.
- Born: January 31, 1965 (age 61)
- Hometown: Laguna Beach, California, U.S.
- Height: 6 ft 3 in (191 cm)
- Education: University of Southern California

Volleyball information
- Position: Outside hitter
- Number: 9 (USC)

National team
1988–1989	United States

Adam Johnson (born January 31, 1965) is an American former professional beach volleyball player. In total, he won 44 beach volleyball tournaments, and won about $1,700,000 in prizes in his career. 16 of his tournament wins were with volleyball legend Karch Kiraly as his partner.

== High school ==
Johnson played volleyball, soccer, and football at Laguna Beach High School in Laguna Beach, California. As a punter, he averaged 42.7 yards per punt.

== College ==
Johnson played college volleyball for the University of Southern California (USC). He was a three-time All-American while playing for the Trojans. In 1986, he was selected as the NCAA Player of the Year by Volleyball Monthly. He graduated in 1987 with a degree in communication. In 2012, his number 9 jersey was retired by USC.

== National team ==
After college, Johnson briefly played as an outside hitter for the United States national volleyball team, but was unable to compete in the 1988 Summer Olympics due to an ankle injury just before the tournament.

== Beach volleyball ==
As a beach volleyball player, Johnson became one of the biggest stars in the AVP in the 1990s. In 1991, he was selected as the Most Improved Player in the AVP. In 1994, he won the prestigious Manhattan Beach Open with partner Randy Stoklos, earning him the "King of the Beach" title. He was selected as the Best Defensive Player of the AVP in 1993 and 1997. In 1998, with partner Kiraly, Johnson was the top-seeded player in the AVP. In 1999, with partner Kiraly, Johnson again achieved the top-seeded ranking in the AVP, and helped Kiraly establish a record for most tournament wins. He retired in 2000, and then briefly made a comeback in 2005.

== Hall of Fame ==
In 2012, Johnson was inducted into the California Beach Volleyball Association (CBVA) Beach Volleyball Hall of Fame. In 2024, he was inducted into the Southern California Indoor Volleyball Hall of Fame.

== Coaching ==
Since retiring, Johnson has offered volleyball instruction through the Adam Johnson Volleyball Academy.
