= Sinjin Smith =

American beach volleyball player

Personal information
- Nickname: Sinjin
- Born: Christopher St. John Smith; May 7, 1957 (age 69); Santa Monica, California, U.S.
- Height: 6 ft 3 in (191 cm)
- Education: University of California, Los Angeles

Volleyball information
- Position: Setter
- Number: 22 (UCLA)
Medal record
Men's beach volleyball
Representing the United States
Goodwill Games
Bronze medal – third place	1994 Saint Petersburg	Beach

Christopher St. John "Sinjin" Smith (born May 7, 1957) is an American former professional beach volleyball player. He was the first player to win 100 career tournaments, and won numerous Manhattan Open titles with Karch Kiraly and Randy Stoklos as partners.

== College ==
Smith went to college at UCLA, where he was a setter. UCLA won the National Championship in Smith's freshman year. In his junior year, the team again reached the finals before losing to Pepperdine, and Smith was selected to the All-Tournament Team. In his senior year in 1979, the Bruins defeated cross-town rival USC to win the National Championship. Smith was again selected to the All-Tournament Team, and was voted the Championship's Most Outstanding Player. Smith was selected as an All-American in both his junior and senior years.

Smith was inducted into the UCLA Hall of Fame in 1991.

== Beach volleyball ==
Smith began to compete as a professional in the two-man beach volleyball tournaments of Southern California at age fifteen. When he started playing beach volleyball, players were motivated primarily by the prestige of winning tournaments rather than money, since winnings were relatively meager. He won his first beach tournament with former UCLA teammate "Stormin" Mike Normand. He won his first Manhattan Open in 1979 teaming with another UCLA alum, Jim Menges. In the early 1980s, he made a successful beach team pairing with former UCLA teammate Kiraly. They split up when Kiraly committed full-time to the U.S. national team.

Smith moved on to partner with Stoklos, and the two became the most dominant pair in men's beach volleyball. Smith was selected as the Best Defensive Player by the AVP in 1990, 1991, and 1992. He won a bronze medal in beach volleyball at the 1994 Goodwill Games in Saint Petersburg.

By the time Smith announced his retirement in 2001, he had won 139 career tournaments. He had also amassed $1,700,000 in career prize money. As a primary force behind the growth of beach volleyball as a sport, he was inducted into the California Beach Volleyball Hall of Fame in 2002 and the International Volleyball Hall of Fame in 2003.

== Popular culture ==
The pair of Smith and Stoklos was featured in the video game Kings of the Beach released by Electronic Arts for MS-DOS in 1988 and Commodore 64 in 1989, and in 1990 it was released for the Nintendo Entertainment System. The pair also appeared in the 1990 film Side Out as the nemesis team of Rollo Vincent (Stoklos) and Billy Cross (Smith).

Smith had a brief career as a television actor, appearing most notably on an episode of Magnum, P.I. as Magnum's volleyball partner who winds up dead under suspicious circumstances.

In 1990, Smith was selected as one of the "50 Most Beautiful People in the World" by People.

== Awards ==
- Two-time All-American 1978, 1979
- Two-time NCAA Champion 1976, 1979
- NCAA Championship Most Outstanding Player 1979
- AVP Best Defensive Player 1990, 1991, 1992
- UCLA Hall of Fame 1991
- Goodwill Games beach volleyball bronze medal 1994
- CBVA Hall of Fame 2002
- International Volleyball Hall of Fame 2003

Sporting positions
Preceded by Inaugural	Men's FIVB Beach Volley World Tour Winner alongside (United States) Randy Stoklos; 1989–1992	Succeeded by Roberto Lopes and Franco Neto (BRA)
