= Randy Stoklos =

American beach volleyball player

Personal information
- Born: December 13, 1960 (age 65)
- Hometown: Pacific Palisades, California, U.S.
- Height: 6 ft 4 in (1.93 m)
- Education: University of California, Los Angeles

Randy Stoklos (born December 13, 1960) is a retired American beach volleyball player. Stoklos is the first player to earn $1 million playing competitive beach volleyball. He is a five-time winner of the prestigious Manhattan Open.

== Volleyball career ==
Stoklos played college volleyball at UCLA and left early to focus on beach volleyball. He won his first Manhattan Open partnering with Jim Menges in 1981. He then went on to dominate the sport with partner Sinjin Smith in the 1980s and early 1990s.

Stoklos has 122 career wins, which ranks him third of all time. He was selected as MVP of the AVP in 1988, 1989, and 1991. He was selected as the Best Setter in 1989. He retired in 1997, having amassed almost $2 million in prize money in his career.

In 1992, Stoklos reflected on his father's unwillingness to allow him to play volleyball at the beach in his youth. His father, who survived a German work camp as a Pole, was an "old-country type" who was afraid his son would grow up to be lazy if he spent too much time at the beach.

== Hall of Fame ==
For his achievements and pioneering role in the sport, Stoklos was inducted into the California Beach Volleyball Association (CBVA) Beach Volleyball Hall of Fame in 1999. In 2008, he was inducted into the International Volleyball Hall of Fame. In 2015, he was inducted into the National Polish-American Sports Hall of Fame.

== Popular culture ==
The pair of Stoklos and Smith was featured in the video game Kings of the Beach released by Electronic Arts for MS-DOS in 1988 and Commodore 64 in 1989, and in 1990 it was released for the Nintendo Entertainment System. The pair also appeared in the 1990 film Side Out as Rollo Vincent (Stoklos) and Billy Cross (Smith).

== Awards ==
- AVP Most Valuable Player 1988, 1989, 1991
- AVP Best Setter 1989
- CBVA Hall of Fame 1999
- International Volleyball Hall of Fame 2008
- National Polish-American Sports Hall of Fame 2015

Sporting positions
Preceded by Inaugural	Men's FIVB Beach Volley World Tour Winner alongside (United States) Sinjin Smith; 1989 – 1992	Succeeded by Roberto Lopes and Franco Neto (BRA)
