= Jan Kvalheim =

Norwegian beach volleyball player (born 1963)

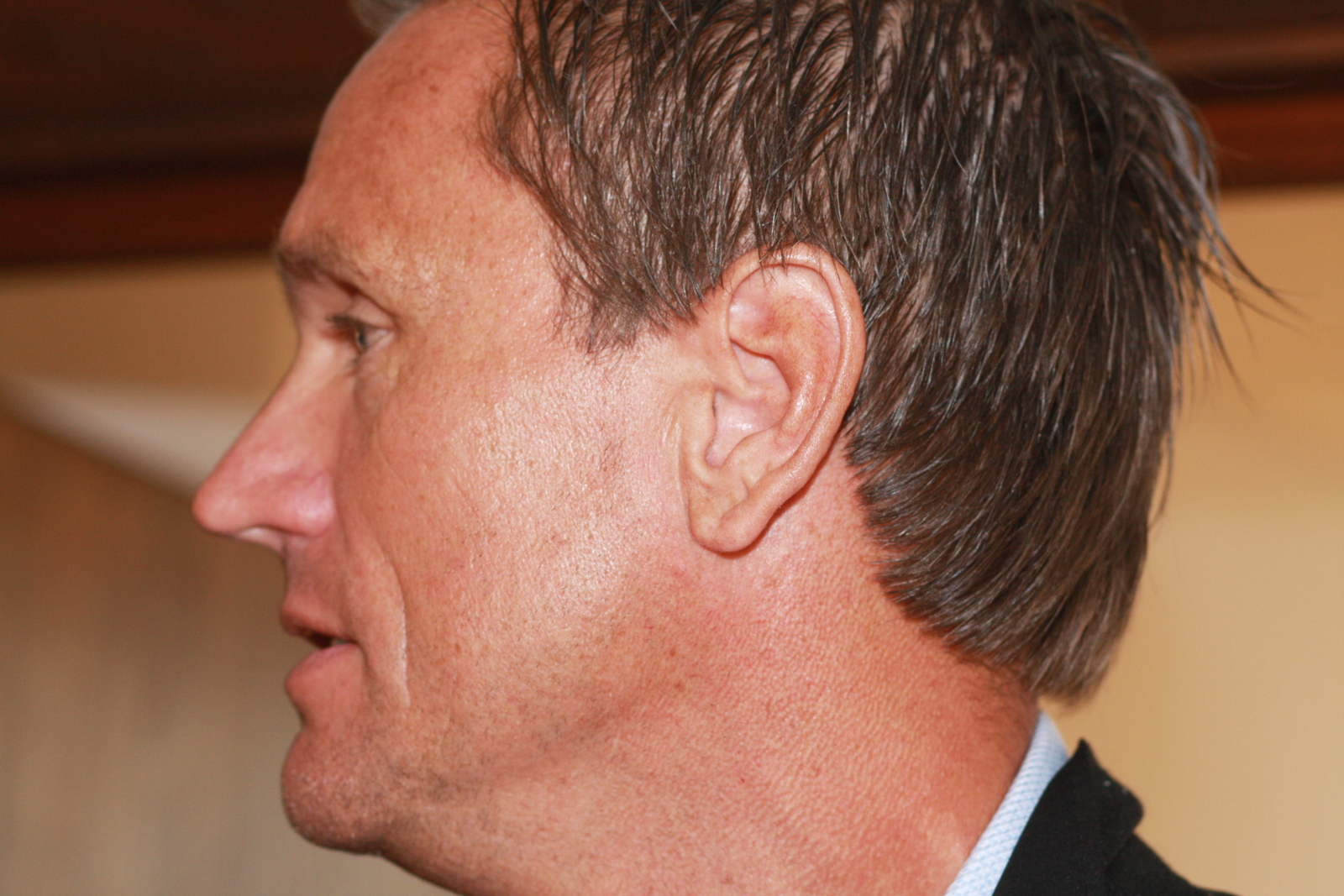
Jan Kvalheim

Jan Kvalheim (born 5 February 1963, Skien) is a former beach volleyball player from Norway, who represented his native country in two consecutive Summer Olympics: 1996 and 2000. Alongside Bjørn Maaseide he won several medals at the European Championships in the 1990s and became world champion in the 1994-1995 season. Kvalheim/Maaseide have 7 wins on the FIVB World Tour.

Kvalheim played pro volleyball in France in Arago Sète (1984–1989) and AS Cannes (1989–1992) and became French champion 2 times with AS Cannes and won the French cup in 1988 with Arago Sète.

Kvalheim is now working for Kvalheim/Maaseide as, which is part of World Event - and was the personal manager for John Arne Riise who plays football in Fulham FC. He was the press director for the FIVB Beach Volleyball World Championships in Stavanger 2009.

== Playing partners ==
- Björn Maaseide
- Bard-Inge Pettersen
- Thierry Glowacz
- Iver Horrem

Sporting positions
Preceded by Roberto Lopes and Franco Neto (BRA)	Men's FIVB Beach Volley World Tour Winner alongside (Norway) Bjørn Maaseide; 1994	Succeeded by Roberto Lopes and Franco Neto (BRA)
