= Nancy Reno =

American beach volleyball player

Personal information
- Born: December 24, 1965 (age 60); Glen Ellyn, Illinois, U.S.
- Height: 5 ft 11 in (1.80 m)
- Education: Stanford University

Volleyball information
- Number: 11 (Stanford)

National team
1989	United States
Medal record
Women's beach volleyball
Representing the United States
World Championships
Bronze medal – third place	1997 Los Angeles	Beach

Nancy Reno (born December 24, 1965) is an American female retired beach volleyball player. She won the bronze medal at the 1997 World Championships in Los Angeles, partnering with Karolyn Kirby. The pair also won the tournament at the 1992 Summer Olympics in Barcelona, at which time beach volleyball was a demonstration sport. Reno finished in fifth place at the inaugural beach volleyball competition at the 1996 Summer Olympics in Atlanta, alongside Holly McPeak.

In Reno's beach volleyball career, she won 38 tournaments and $610,000 in prizes. Reno retired from beach volleyball in 2000.

== College ==
Reno played college volleyball for Stanford University, and was an AVCA first-team All-American in 1987.

Sporting positions
Preceded by Inaugural	Women's FIVB Beach World Tour Winner alongside (United States) Karolyn Kirby; 1992	Succeeded by Liz Masakayan and Karolyn Kirby (USA)
