= Adriana Samuel =

Brazilian beach volleyball player

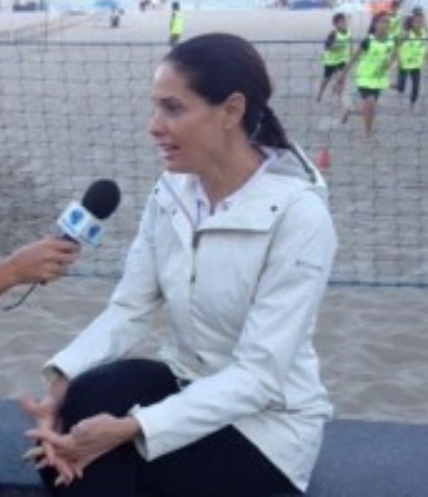

Personal information
- Born: 12 April 1966 (age 60); Resende, Rio de Janeiro, Brazil
- Height: 5 ft 10 in (1.78 m)
Medal record
Women's beach volleyball
Representing Brazil
Olympic Games
Silver medal – second place	1996 Atlanta	Beach
Bronze medal – third place	2000 Sydney	Beach
Goodwill Games
Silver medal – second place	1994 St. Petersburg	Beach

Adriana Samuel Ramos (born 12 April 1966) is a Brazilian volleyball and beach volleyball player who won the silver medal in the inaugural women's beach volleyball tournament at the 1996 Summer Olympics, partnering with Mônica Rodrigues.

Samuel begun her career with indoor volleyball, even becoming a part of Brazil women's national volleyball team. She competed at the 1984 FIVB Volleyball Women's U20 World Championship, the 1985 FIVB Volleyball Women's World Cup, and the 1986 FIVB Volleyball Women's World Championship. However, she left the court in 1992, moving into the beach by forming a partnership with Mônica Rodrigues.

Samuel also represented her native country at the 2000 Summer Olympics in Sydney, Australia, where she claimed the bronze medal, teaming up with Sandra Pires (who had defeated Samuel in Atlanta).

== Personal life ==
Adriana's brother, Alexandre "Tande" Samuel, is also a volleyball player. He won the gold medal in the 1992 Summer Olympics in Barcelona.

Sporting positions
Preceded by Liz Masakayan and Karolyn Kirby (USA)	Women's FIVB Beach World Tour Winner alongside (Brazil) Mônica Rodrigues; 1994	Succeeded by Jackie Silva and Sandra Pires (BRA)
