= Liz Masakayan =

American beach volleyball player

Personal information
- Full name: Elizabeth Lee Masakayan
- Nationality: Filipino / American
- Born: December 31, 1964 (age 61); Quezon City, Philippines
- Height: 5 ft 8 in (173 cm)
- Education: UCLA

Volleyball information
- Position: Outside hitter
- Number: 3 (national team); 21 (UCLA)

National team
1986–1991	United States
Medal record
Women's volleyball
Representing the United States
World Championship
Bronze medal – third place	1990 China	Indoor
Goodwill Games
Bronze medal – third place	1986 Moscow	Indoor
Pan American Games
Bronze medal – third place	1987 Indianapolis	Indoor
Women's beach volleyball
Representing the United States
Goodwill Games
Gold medal – first place	1994 Saint Petersburg	Beach

Liz Masakayan (born December 31, 1964) is a Filipino-American former indoor and beach volleyball player, and current coach. She participated in the 1988 Summer Olympics with the United States women's national volleyball team, and as a beach volleyball player won a total of 47 tournaments in her career.

== Early life ==
Masakayan's Filipino father and US-born mother met each other in New York City. Liz Masakayan was born in Quezon City on December 31, 1964. Masakayan, and her mother, moved to Santa Monica, California when she was four or five years old.

Volleyball was the last organized sport Masakayan tried out for in her first year (10th grade) at Santa Monica High School (a three-year school back in the 1980s). Her first year was spent on the junior varsity squad, and the last two on the varsity counterpart, where the team won the California state championship in 1981.

Masakayan played Little League baseball when she was ten, the first year it allowed girls to play due to Title IX. Most of the time she was the only girl on the team. Masakayan heard a lot of comments over four years from playing on a team full of boys but says, "I learned at an early age that if you just worked hard, had fun, and treated people nicely, that everything would fall into place, like winning". She played soccer for seven years and ran track for four years. Masakayan helped form the first girls' soccer team at Santa Monica High School.

== Career ==
=== College ===
After winning the 1984 NCAA Championships at UCLA, where she still holds numerous single season and career records, Masakayan was given the Broderick Award for being the nation's premier collegiate volleyball player. Masakayan was a two-time AVCA first-team All-American, and was named the 1985–86 UCLA Female Athlete of the Year. She has also been inducted into the UCLA Athletics Hall of Fame.

=== National team ===
As an indoor player, Masakayan was an outside hitter for the United States women's national volleyball team for five years, and competed at the 1988 Seoul Olympics. She won bronze medals at the 1990 World Championships in Beijing, 1987 Pan American Games in Indianapolis, and 1986 Goodwill Games in Moscow.

=== Beach volleyball ===
The pair of Karolyn Kirby and Masakayan were the most dominant team in the early 1990s, winning 29 tournaments. They won the inaugural 1994 Goodwill Games in Saint Petersburg. They also won the 1994 World Champions in La Serena. Masakyan was the WPVA's (Women's Professional Volleyball Association) 1992 Most Valuable Player, the 1993 co-Most Valuable Player, and the Best Defensive Player in 1991 and 1992. In addition, she was the 1993 and 1994 Best Hitter, and the 1995 Most Inspirational Player after coming back from several knee surgeries.

Masakayan and her partner, Elaine Youngs, narrowly missed qualifying for the 2000 Sydney Olympics. They captured the first tournament of the millennium in February 2000 in Vitória. The pair also won the bronze medal at the 1999 World Championships in Marseille.

Throughout Masakayan's beach volleyball career, she won 47 tournaments and reached the final four 61 times. In 2001, she was the Santa Barbara champion, and in December captured the bronze medal at the FIVB (Fédération Internationale de Volleyball) season finale in Fortaleza, where Masakayan announced her retirement from international competition. She retired from domestic competition after playing four tournaments in 2005.

== Coaching ==
=== Indoor coaching ===
As an indoor coach, Masakayan was an assistant coach at UCLA when they won the National Championships in 1991 and runner-up in 1992. Masakayan was inducted in the AVCA (American Volleyball Coaches Association) Hall of Fame in December 2011.

=== Beach volleyball coaching ===
Masakayan coached the beach volleyball team of Elaine Youngs and Nicole Branagh, who were ranked second in the AVP in 2007.

Sporting positions
Preceded by Nancy Reno and Karolyn Kirby (USA)	Women's FIVB World Tour Points Champions alongside (United States) Karolyn Kirby; 1993	Succeeded by Adriana Samuel and Mônica Rodrigues (BRA)
