= Brazil at the 1996 Summer Olympics =

- IOC code: BRA
- NOC: Brazilian Olympic Committee
- Website: www.cob.org.br (in Portuguese)

in Atlanta
- Competitors: 225 (159 men, 66 women) in 19 sports
- Flag bearer: Joaquim Cruz
- Medals Ranked 25th: Gold 3 Silver 3 Bronze 9 Total 15

Summer Olympics appearances (overview)
- 1920; 1924; 1928; 1932; 1936; 1948; 1952; 1956; 1960; 1964; 1968; 1972; 1976; 1980; 1984; 1988; 1992; 1996; 2000; 2004; 2008; 2012; 2016; 2020; 2024; 2028

Brazil competed at the 1996 Summer Olympics in Atlanta, United States. 225 athletes – 159 men, 66 women – competed in 18 sports. The country set a record with both 15 medals – only surpassed in 2008 – and 3 golds – surpassed in 2004 with five.

In the debutant beach volleyball, several remarkable achievements were earned when it happened the all-Brazilian final between Sandra Pires and Jackie Silva (who won gold) and Mônica Rodrigues and Adriana Samuel:

- the first Olympic medals ever won by Brazilian women in any sport
- the first Olympic gold medal ever won by Brazilian women.
- the first medal ever earned in beach volleyball
- the first gold medal ever in the sport.

Brazil has also won the first medal ever in Equestrian, when the team jumping conquered the bronze medal, marking also the first medal ever in a mixed gender Olympic event.

== Summary ==
After 76 years since the debut of the country at the 1920 Summer Olympics, Brazilian women finally won Olympic medals. That happened for the first time in the all-Brazilians beach volleyball final between Sandra Pires and Jackie Silva (who won gold) and Mônica Rodrigues and Adriana Samuel. Beach volleyball competitions made its debut at 1996 Summer Olympics.

The other two gold medals were both obtained in Sailing events. Robert Scheidt was gold medalist in the Laser class. Torben Grael and Marcelo Ferreira won Star class. It was the first medal of Robert Scheidt and the third medal of Torben Grael; both sailors are the onliest Brazilian athletes with the record of five Olympic medals (two of them are gold). Besides the two gold medals, a bronze medal was also obtained in sailing by Torben's brother Lars Grael and Kiko Pellicano in Tornado class.

Brazil women's national basketball team, led by Hortência Marcari, Janeth Arcain and Maria Paula Silva, had a great performance, losing the gold medal match to host country United States women's national basketball team. It was the first medal won by women in Basketball.

The swimmer Gustavo Borges obtained the silver medal in men's 200 metre freestyle and the bronze medal in 100 metre freestyle. The other medal obtained in swimmer was the bronze medal conquered by Fernando Scherer in men's 50 m freestyle.

Brazil women's national volleyball team, finally won its first Olympic medal after a hard bronze medal match against Russia by 3 sets to 2.

At the men's football tournament, the under-23 football team lost a dramatic semifinal to Nigeria by 4–3, after being winning the match by 3 to 0. In the bronze medal match, Brazil beat Portugal by 5–0.

At the Judo events, Brazil won two bronze medals. The 1988 Olympic champion Aurélio Miguel obtained a medal in men's 95 kg category, while Henrique Guimarães was the medalist in men's 65 kg category.

The bronze medal obtained by equestrians Luiz Felipe de Azevedo, André Johannpeter, Alvaro Miranda Neto and Rodrigo Pessoa in team jumping was the first of the History of the country not only in Equestrian as also in a mixed gender Olympic event, tough all 4 members of the team were men.

Finally, Robson da Silva, Édson Ribeiro, André da Silva and Arnaldo da Silva obtained for the first time ever a medal in a relay event in Athletics, the bronze in the men's 4 × 100 metres relay.

== Medalists ==
Medal	Name	Sport	Event	Date
Gold	Sandra Pires; Jackie Silva	Volleyball	Women's beach volleyball	July 27
Gold	Torben Grael; Marcelo Ferreira	Sailing	Star class	July 29
Gold	Robert Scheidt	Sailing	Laser class	July 31
Silver	Gustavo Borges	Swimming	Men's 200 metre freestyle	July 20
Silver	Adriana Samuel; Mônica Rodrigues	Volleyball	Women's beach volleyball	July 27
Silver	Brazil women's national basketball team: Maria Angélica; Janeth Arcain; Roseli Gustavo; Silvinha; Hortência Marcari Oliva; Alessandra Oliveira; Claudia Maria Pastor; Adriana Santos; Cintia Santos; Maria Paula Silva; Leila Sobral; Marta de Souza Sobral	Basketball	Women's tournament	August 4
Bronze	Aurélio Miguel	Judo	Men's 95 kg	July 21
Bronze	Gustavo Borges	Swimming	Men's 100 m freestyle	July 22
Bronze	Henrique Guimarães	Judo	Men's 65 kg	July 25
Bronze	Fernando Scherer	Swimming	Men's 50 m freestyle	July 25
Bronze	Lars Grael; Henrique Pellicano	Sailing	Tornado class	July 30
Bronze	Luiz Felipe de Azevedo; André Johannpeter; Alvaro Miranda Neto; Rodrigo Pessoa	Equestrian	Team jumping	August 1
Bronze	Brazil national under-23 football team: Aldair; Amaral; Bebeto; Danrlei; André Luiz; Flavio Conceição; Juninho Paulista; Luizão; Marcelinho Paulista; Narciso; Rivaldo; Roberto Carlos; Ronaldo Guiaro; Ronaldo; Savio; Dida; Ze Elias; Zé Maria	Football	Men's tournament	August 2
Bronze	Brazil women's national volleyball team: Ana Ida Alvares; Leila Barros; Ericleia Bodziak; Hilma Caldeira; Ana Paula Connelly; Virna Dias; Ana Moser; Ana Flavia Sanglard; Hélia Souza; Sandra Suruagy; Fernanda Venturini; Marcia Fu Cunha	Volleyball	Women's tournament	August 3
Bronze	Robson da Silva; Édson Ribeiro; André da Silva; Arnaldo da Silva	Athletics	Men's 4 × 100 metres relay	August 3

Medals by sport
Sport	1st place, gold medalist(s)	2nd place, silver medalist(s)	3rd place, bronze medalist(s)	Total
Sailing	2	0	1	3
Volleyball	1	1	1	3
Swimming	0	1	2	3
Basketball	0	1	0	1
Judo	0	0	2	2
Football	0	0	1	1
Athletics	0	0	1	1
Equestrian	0	0	1	1
Total	3	3	9	15

Medals by date
Date	1st place, gold medalist(s)	2nd place, silver medalist(s)	3rd place, bronze medalist(s)	Total
20 July	0	1	0	1
21 July	0	0	1	1
22 July	0	0	1	1
23 July	0	0	0	0
24 July	0	0	0	0
25 July	0	0	2	2
26 July	0	0	0	0
27 July	1	1	0	2
28 July	0	0	0	0
29 July	1	0	0	1
30 July	0	0	1	1
31 July	1	0	0	1
1 Aug	0	0	1	1
2 Aug	0	0	1	1
3 Aug	0	0	2	2
4 Aug	0	1	0	1
Total	3	3	9	15

Medals by gender
Gender	1st place, gold medalist(s)	2nd place, silver medalist(s)	3rd place, bronze medalist(s)	Total
Male	2	1	7	10
Female	1	2	1	4
Mixed/Open (Note: Medals won in Equestrian are considered an open event because men and women compete together.)	0	0	1	1
Total	3	3	9	15

=== Multiple medallist ===
The following competitor won several medals at the 1996 Olympic Games.

Name	Medal	Sport	Event
Gustavo Borges	Silver; Bronze	Swimming	Men's 200 metre freestyle Men's 100 metre freestyle

== Competitors ==
The following is the list of number of competitors in the Games.

Sport	Men	Women	Total
Athletics	31	9	40
Basketball	12	12	24
Beach volleyball	4	4	8
Boxing	6	–	6
Canoeing	3	0	3
Cycling	8	0	6
Equestrian	9	0	8
Football	17	16	33
Handball	16	0	16
Judo	7	5	12
Rowing	6	0	6
Sailing	12	2	14
Shooting	1	0	1
Swimming	9	1	10
Table tennis	2	2	4
Tennis	1	2	3
Volleyball	11	12	23
Weightlifting	1	–	1
Total	156	65	221

== Athletics ==
Men
Track & road events

Athlete	Event	Heat		Quarterfinal		Semifinal		Final	
Athlete	Event	Result	Rank	Result	Rank	Result	Rank	Result	Rank
André da Silva	100 m	10.25	12 Q	10.26	19	Did not advance			
Arnaldo da Silva	100 m	10.62	70	Did not advance					
Edson Ribeiro	100 m	10.39	42	Did not advance					
Claudinei da Silva	200 m	20.80	36 Q	DNF		Did not advance			
Robson da Silva	200 m	20.61	16 Q	20.65	24	Did not advance			
Edson Ribeiro	200 m	20.69	22 Q	20.60	20	Did not advance			
Valdinei da Silva	400 m	46.61	39	Did not advance					
Osmar dos Santos	400 m	46.16	33	Did not advance					
Sanderlei Parrela	400 m	45.60	13 Q	45.72	23	Did not advance			
José Luíz Barbosa	800 m	1:46.58	15 q	—N/a		1:50.33	23	Did not advance	
Flávio Godoy	800 m	1:48.91	34	—N/a		Did not advance			
Joaquim Cruz	1500 m	3:45.32	42	—N/a		Did not advance			
Edgar de Oliveira	1500 m	3:40.70	30	—N/a		Did not advance			
Adalberto Garcia	5000 m	14:28.64	32	—N/a		Did not advance			
Ronaldo da Costa	10000 m	29:26.58	36	—N/a				Did not advance	
Vanderlei de Lima	Marathon	—N/a						2:21:01	47
Diamantino dos Santos	Marathon	—N/a						2:26:53	73
Luíz Antônio dos Santos	Marathon	—N/a						2:15:55	10
Pedro Chiamulera	110 m hurdles	13.70	22 q	13.77	27	Did not advance			
Walmes de Souza	110 m hurdles	13.82	32 Q	14.12	29	Did not advance			
Emerson Perin	110 m hurdles	13.76	33	Did not advance					
Cleverson da Silva	400 m hurdles	51.23	37	—N/a		Did not advance			
Eronilde de Araújo	400 m hurdles	48.52	3 Q	—N/a		48.45	8 Q	48.78	8
Éverson Teixeira	400 m hurdles	48.52	3 Q	—N/a		48.28	4 Q	48.57	7
Clodoaldo do Carmo	3000 m steeplechase	8:51.78	34	—N/a		Did not advance			
André da Silva; Arnaldo da Silva; Robson da Silva; Edson Ribeiro	4 × 100 m relay	38.97	6 Q	—N/a		38.42	3 Q	38.41	3rd place, bronze medalist(s)
Valdinei da Silva; Eronilde de Araújo; Osmar dos Santos; Sanderlei Parrela; Éverson Teixeira	4 × 400 m relay	3:02.51	4 q	—N/a		3:03.46	11	Did not advance	
Cláudio Bertolino	20 km walk	—N/a						1:31:04	49
Sérgio Galdino	20 km walk	—N/a						1:25:14	26

Field events

Athlete	Event	Qualification		Final	
Athlete	Event	Distance	Position	Distance	Position
Márcio da Cruz	Long jump	7.12	42	Did not advance	
Douglas de Souza	Long jump	7.61	33	Did not advance	
Nélson Ferreira Júnior	Long jump	7.76	27	Did not advance	
Messias José Baptista	Triple jump	16.45	22	Did not advance	
Anísio Silva	Triple jump	16.67	18	Did not advance	

Women
Track & road events

Athlete	Event	Heat		Quarterfinal		Semifinal		Final	
Athlete	Event	Result	Rank	Result	Rank	Result	Rank	Result	Rank
Cleide Amaral	100 m	11.76	41	Did not advance					
Maria Magnólia Figueiredo	400 m	52.41	24 Q	51.98	22	Did not advance			
Luciana Mendes	800 m	2:00.25	17	—N/a		Did not advance			
Roseli Machado	5000 m	15:41.63	21	—N/a		Did not advance			
Carmen de Oliveira	Marathon	—N/a						DNF	
Solange de Souza	Marathon	—N/a						2:56:23	60
Márcia Narloch	Marathon	—N/a						2:39:33	39

Field events

Athlete	Event	Qualification		Final	
Athlete	Event	Distance	Position	Distance	Position
Maria de Souza	Triple jump	13.38	21	Did not advance	
Elisângela Adriano	Shot put	16.49	21	Did not advance	

== Basketball ==
=== Men's tournament ===
Team roster

- Ratto
- Tonico
- Josuel
- Caio
- Caio da Silveira
- Olívia
- Ferraciú
- Pipoka
- Janjão
- Oscar Schmidt
- Rogério
- Wilson Minucci

Group play

Pos	Team	Pld	W	L	PF	PA	PD	Pts	Qualification
1	FR Yugoslavia	5	5	0	478	364	+114	10	Quarterfinals
2	Australia	5	4	1	492	438	+54	9	Quarterfinals
3	Greece	5	3	2	402	416	−14	8	Quarterfinals
4	Brazil	5	2	3	498	494	+4	7	Quarterfinals
5	Puerto Rico	5	1	4	447	465	−18	6	9th place playoff
6	South Korea	5	0	5	422	562	−140	5	11th place playoff

Source: FIBA archive
Rules for classification: 1) points; 2) head-to-head points; 3) head-to-head goal average; 4) head-to-head number of points scored.

20 July 1996

Report

Puerto Rico	98–101	Brazil
Scoring by half: 54–58, 44–43
Pts: Ortiz 35; Rebs: Ortiz 11; Asts: Mincy 7		Pts: Schmidt 45; Rebs: Vianna 8 Asts: Ratto 10

Atlanta
Referees: Pascal Noel Dorizon (FRA), Romualdas Brazauskas (LTU)

22 July 1996

Report

Brazil	87–89	Greece
Scoring by half: 54–54, 33–35
Pts: Schmidt 32; Rebs: dos Santos 10; Asts: Minuci 6		Pts: Oikonomou 36; Rebs: Fasoulas 6 Asts: Bakatsias 5

Atlanta
Referees: Joseph Derosa (USA), Miguel Betancor Leon (ESP)

24 July 1996

Report

Australia	109–101 (OT)	Brazil
Scoring by half: 41–46, 41–36 Overtime: 27–19
Pts: Heal 35; Rebs: Bradtke 15; Asts: Bradtke 4		Pts: Schmidt 24; Rebs: dos Santos 13; Asts: Minuci 6

Atlanta
Referees: Donald Cline (CAN), Carl Jungebrand (FIN)

26 July 1996

Report

Brazil	82–101	FR Yugoslavia
Scoring by half: 31–55, 51–46
Pts: de Mello 19; Rebs: Janjao 6 Asts: Ratto, Klafke 4		Pts: Danilović 21; Rebs: Divac, Tomašević 6 Asts: Obradović 6

Atlanta
Referees: Gennaro Colucci ITA, Raul Chaves Sagel (ARG)

28 July 1996

Report

Brazil	127–97	South Korea
Scoring by half: 66–49, 61–48
Pts: Schmidt 25; Rebs: dos Santos 8 Asts: Minuci 9		Pts: D. H. Kang 24; Rebs: J. Y. Hyun 6 Asts: D. H. Kang 7

Atlanta
Referees: Jiazhong Zhu (CHN), Tomislav Jovancic (YUG)

Quarterfinal

30 July 1996
22:00

Report

United States	98–75	Brazil
Scoring by half: 52–36, 46–39
Pts: Hardaway 14; Rebs: O'Neal 11; Asts: Payton 7		Pts: Schmidt 26; Rebs: Janjao 10; Asts: Minuci 5

Atlanta
Referees: Pascal Noel Dorizon (FRA), Jose Lapaix Guance (DOM)

Classification game 5th-8th place

1 August 1996
12:00

Report

Brazil	80–74	Croatia
Scoring by half: 39–27, 41–47
Pts: Schmidt 32; Rebs: dos Santos, Janjao 7 Asts: Ratto 7		Pts: Tabak 18; Rebs: Tabak 8 Asts: Kukoč 5

Atlanta
Referees: Romualdas Brazauskas (LTU), Jose Reyes Ronfini (MEX)

5th place game

2 August 1996
22:00

Report

Greece	91–72	Brazil
Scoring by half: 45–49, 46–23
Pts: Sigalas 35; Rebs: Fasoulas, Christodoulou 7 Asts: Patavoukas 7		Pts: Minuci 23; Rebs: Vianna 11; Asts: Ratto 7

Atlanta
Referees: Roman Ryzhyk (UKR), Juan Figueroa (PUR)

=== Women's tournament ===
Team roster

- Hortência
- Paula
- Janeth
- Marta Sobral
- Alessandra
- Branca
- Adriana
- Leila
- Roseli
- Silvinha
- Cíntia
- Cláudia

Group play

Pos	Team	Pld	W	L	PF	PA	PD	Pts	Qualification
1	Brazil	5	5	0	424	360	+64	10	Quarterfinals
2	Russia	5	4	1	378	342	+36	9	Quarterfinals
3	Italy	5	3	2	330	309	+21	8	Quarterfinals
4	Japan	5	2	3	365	396	−31	7	Quarterfinals
5	China	5	1	4	347	378	−31	6	
6	Canada	5	0	5	293	352	−59	5	

Source: FIBA archive
Rules for classification: 1) points; 2) head-to-head points; 3) head-to-head goal average; 4) head-to-head number of points scored.

21 July 1996

Boxscore

Brazil	69–56	Canada
Pts: Paula, Janeth 17; Rebs: Janeth 8 Asts: Janeth 4		Pts: Blackwell 11; Rebs: Smith 7 Asts: Evans 4

Morehouse College Gymnasium, Atlanta

23 July 1996

Boxscore

Russia	68–82	Brazil
Pts: Rutkovskaya 18; Rebs: Baranova 9 Asts: Zaboluyeva 3		Pts: Hortência 20; Rebs: Marta Sobral 9 Asts: three players 4

Morehouse College Gymnasium, Atlanta

25 July 1996

Brazil	100–80	Japan
Pts: Paula 25; Rebs: Leila 14; Asts: Paula 10		Pts: Ichijo 16; Rebs: Nagata, Murakami 5 Asts: Murakami 4

Morehouse College Gymnasium, Atlanta

27 July 1996

Boxscore

China	83–98	Brazil
Pts: He J 22; Rebs: Liang X 5 Asts: Zheng D, Liu J 6		Pts: Janeth 26; Rebs: three players 9 Asts: Paula 8

Morehouse College Gymnasium, Atlanta

29 July 1996

Boxscore

Italy	73–75	Brazil
Pts: Bonfiglio 15; Rebs: Pollini 5 Asts: Pollini 4		Pts: Janeth 17; Rebs: Marta Sobral 8 Asts: Janeth 5

Morehouse College Gymnasium, Atlanta

Quarterfinal

31 July 1996
22:00

Boxscore

Brazil	101–69	Cuba
Scoring by half: 50–33, 51–36
Pts: Paula, Janeth 19; Rebs: Janeth, Marta Sobral 10; Asts: Janeth 6		Pts: Martínez 25; Rebs: Martínez 9 Asts: four players 2

Georgia Dome, Atlanta

Semifinal

2 August 1996
15:00

Boxscore

Brazil	81–60	Ukraine
Scoring by half: 48–36, 33–24
Pts: Paula 24; Rebs: Alessandra 13; Asts: Paula 6		Pts: Zhyrko 15; Rebs: Sadovnykova 6 Asts: Tkachenko 5

Georgia Dome, Atlanta

Gold medal game

4 August 1996
18:35

Boxscore

Brazil	87–111	United States
Scoring by half: 46–57, 41–54
Pts: Arcain 24; Rebs: Alessandra 9 Asts: Paula 10		Pts: Leslie 29; Rebs: Leslie 6 Asts: Edwards 10

Georgia Dome, Atlanta

== Boxing ==
Athlete	Event	Round of 32	Round of 16	Quarterfinal	Semifinal	Final
Athlete	Event	Opposition Result	Opposition Result	Opposition Result	Opposition Result	Opposition Result
Rogério Dezorzi	Featherweight	Bahari (INA); W 12-3	Aragon (CUB); L 16-6	Did not advance		
Agnaldo Magalhães	Lightweight	Kungsi (PNG); W 11-11	Soltani (ALG); L 11-1	Did not advance		
Zely dos Santos	Light welterweight	Barrett (IRL); L 32-7	Did not advance			
Jorge Silva	Light middleweight	Cadeau (SEY); L 22-7	Did not advance			
José Ricardo Rodrigues	Middleweight	Gasio (SAM); W 11-4	Wells (USA); L 16-2	Did not advance		
Daniel Andrade Júnior	Light heavyweight	Adnan (SYR); W 9-4	Mandengue (FRA); W RSC	Ulrich (GER); L 14-7	Did not advance	

== Canoeing ==
=== Slalom ===
Athlete	Event	Run 1	Rank	Run 2	Rank	Best	Rank
Leonardo Selbach	Men's C-1	216.51	24	184.54	19	184.54	23
Gustavo Selbach	Men's K-1	168.33	28	162.48	23	168.33	32

=== Sprint ===
Men

Athlete	Event	Heats		Repechage		Semifinals		Final	
Athlete	Event	Time	Rank	Time	Rank	Time	Rank	Time	Rank
Sebastián Cuattrin	K-1 500 m	1:44.328	5	1:44.204	4 Q	1:43.045	9	Did not advance	
Sebastián Cuattrin	K-1 1000 m	3:49.308	5	4:02.527	1 Q	3:44.443	5 q	3:34.669	8

== Cycling ==
=== Road ===
Men

Athlete	Event	Time	Rank
Valdir Lermen	Time trial	1:14:48	36
Márcio May	Road race	DNF	
Hernandes Quadri Júnior	Road race	DNF	
Hernandes Quadri Júnior	Time trial	1:14:12	35
Mauro Ribeiro	Road race	4:56:51	91
Daniel Rogelin	Road race	DNF	
Jamil Suaiden	Road race	DNF	

=== Mountain biking ===
Men

Athlete	Event	Time	Rank
Ivanir Lopes	Cross-country	2:53:29	35
Márcio Ravelli	Cross-country	2:45:16	27

== Equestrian ==
=== Eventing ===
Athlete	Horse	Event	Dressage		Cross-country			Jumping			Total	
Athlete	Horse	Event	Penalties	Rank	Penalties	Total	Rank	Penalties	Total	Rank	Penalties	Rank
Artemus de Almeida	Buryand	Individual	51.60	15	DQ			DNF				
Sidney de Souza	Avalaon da Mata	Team	208.60	16	1959.60	2168.20	15	6.25	6.25	–	2174.45	15
Luciano Drubi	Xilena	Team	208.60	16	1959.60	2168.20	15	6.25	6.25	–	2174.45	15
Serguei Fofanoff	Kaiser Eden	Team	208.60	16	1959.60	2168.20	15	6.25	6.25	–	2174.45	15
André Giovanini	Al do Beto	Team	208.60	16	1959.60	2168.20	15	6.25	6.25	–	2174.45	15

=== Jumping ===
Athlete	Horse	Event	Qualification						Final			Total	
Athlete	Horse	Event	Round 1	Round 2		Round 3			Round 1		Jump-off	Total	
Athlete	Horse	Event	Penalties	Penalties	Total	Penalties	Total	Rank	Penalties	Rank	Penalties	Penalties	Rank
Luiz Felipe de Azevedo	Cassiana	Individual	17	8	25	4	29	48	Did not advance				
Álvaro de Miranda Neto	Aspen	Individual	8	0.25	8.25	8	16.25	=23 QU	4	=2	16	4	8
André Johannpeter	Calei	Individual	8.25	4.25	12.50	8	20.50	=34 QC	12	18	—N/a	12	18
Rodrigo Pessoa	Tomboy	Individual	1.25	0	1.25	0.75	2	2 QU	4.25	=9	—N/a	4.25	=9
Luiz Felipe de Azevedo; Álvaro de Miranda Neto; André Johannpeter; Rodrigo Pessoa	See above	Team	—N/a	4.50		12.75	17.25	3	—N/a			17.25	3rd place, bronze medalist(s)

== Football ==
=== Summary ===
Key:

- A.E.T – After extra time.
- P – Match decided by penalty-shootout.

Team	Event	Group stage				Quarterfinal	Semifinal	Final / BM	
Team	Event	Opposition Score	Opposition Score	Opposition Score	Rank	Opposition Score	Opposition Score	Opposition Score	Rank
Brazil men's	Men's tournament	Japan; L 0–1	Hungary; W 3–1	Nigeria; W 1–0	1	Ghana; W 4–2	Nigeria; L 3–4 (a.e.t.)	Portugal; W 5–0	3rd place, bronze medalist(s)
Brazil women's	Women's tournament	Norway; D 2–2	Japan; W 2–0	Germany; D 1–1	2	—N/a	China; L 2–3	Norway; L 0–2	4

=== Men's tournament ===
Team roster

Head coach: Zagallo

No.	Pos.	Player	Date of birth (age)	Caps	Club
1	GK	Dida	7 October 1973 (aged 22)		(Brazil) Cruzeiro
2	DF	Zé María	25 July 1973 (aged 22)		(Brazil) Flamengo
3	DF	Aldair*	30 November 1965 (aged 30)		(Italy) Roma
4	DF	Ronaldo Guiaro	18 February 1974 (aged 22)		(Brazil) Atlético Mineiro
5	MF	Flávio Conceição	13 June 1974 (aged 22)		(Brazil) Palmeiras
6	DF	Roberto Carlos	10 April 1973 (aged 23)		(Italy) Internazionale
7	FW	Bebeto*	16 February 1964 (aged 32)		(Brazil) Flamengo
8	MF	Amaral	28 February 1973 (aged 23)		(Italy) Parma
9	MF	Juninho	22 February 1973 (aged 23)		(England) Middlesbrough
10	MF	Rivaldo*	19 April 1972 (aged 24)		(Brazil) Palmeiras
11	FW	Sávio	9 January 1974 (aged 22)		(Brazil) Flamengo
12	GK	Danrlei	18 April 1973 (aged 23)		(Brazil) Grêmio
13	DF	Narciso	23 December 1973 (aged 22)		(Brazil) Santos
14	MF	André Luiz	11 June 1974 (aged 22)		(Brazil) São Paulo
15	MF	Zé Elias	25 September 1976 (aged 19)		(Brazil) Corinthians
16	MF	Marcelinho	13 September 1973 (aged 22)		(Brazil) Corinthians
17	FW	Luizão	14 November 1975 (aged 20)		(Brazil) Palmeiras
18	FW	Ronaldo	22 September 1976 (aged 19)		(Netherlands) PSV

Group play

Team	Pld	W	D	L	GF	GA	GD	Pts
Brazil	3	2	0	1	4	2	+2	6
Nigeria	3	2	0	1	3	1	+2	6
Japan	3	2	0	1	4	4	0	6
Hungary	3	0	0	3	3	7	−4	0

July 21, 1996
18:30

Japan	1–0	Brazil
Ito 72'	Report

Orange Bowl, Miami
Attendance: 46,713
Referee: Archundia (MEX)

July 23, 1996
20:30

Brazil	3–1	Hungary
Ronaldo 35'; Juninho 61'; Bebeto 84'	Report	Madar 58'

Orange Bowl, Miami
Attendance: 34,871
Referee: Al-Ghandour (EGY)

July 25, 1996
21:00

Brazil	1–0	Nigeria
Ronaldo 30'	Report

Orange Bowl, Miami
Attendance: 55,650
Referee: Baharmast (USA)

Quarterfinal

July 28, 1996
18:00

Brazil	4–2	Ghana
Duodu 18' (o.g.); Ronaldo 56', 62'; Bebeto 72''	Report	Akonnor 23'; Aboagye 53'

Orange Bowl, Miami
Attendance: 45,257
Referee: Un-Prasert (THA)

Semifinal

July 31, 1996
18:00

Nigeria	4–3 (asdet)	Brazil
Roberto Carlos 20' (o.g.); Ikpeba 78'; Kanu 90', 94'	Report	Flávio Conceição 1', 38'; Bebeto 28'

Sanford Stadium, Athens
Attendance: 78,587
Referee: Garcia Aranda (ESP)

Bronze medal match

August 2, 1996
18:00

Brazil	5–0	Portugal
Ronaldo 4'; Flávio Conceição 10'; Bebeto 46', 53', 74'	Report

Sanford Stadium, Athens
Attendance: 68,173
Referee: Al-Ghandour (EGY)

=== Women's tournament ===
Team roster

Head coach: José Duarte

Brazil named a squad of 16 players and 2 alternates for the tournament. During the tournament, Kátia replaced Nilda due to injury.

No.	Pos.	Player	Date of birth (age)	Caps	Goals	Club
1	GK	Meg	1 January 1956 (aged 40)			(Brazilian Football Confederation) Vasco da Gama
2	DF	Nenê	31 March 1976 (aged 20)			(Brazilian Football Confederation) Saad EC
3	DF	Suzy	7 February 1967 (aged 29)			(Brazilian Football Confederation) Vasco da Gama
4	MF	Fanta	14 September 1966 (aged 29)			(Brazilian Football Confederation) Vasco da Gama
5	MF	Márcia Taffarel	15 May 1968 (aged 28)			(Brazilian Football Confederation) Saad EC
6	DF	Elane	4 June 1968 (aged 28)			(Brazilian Football Confederation) Euroexport
7	FW	Pretinha	19 May 1975 (aged 21)			(Brazilian Football Confederation) Vasco da Gama
8	MF	Formiga	3 March 1978 (aged 18)			(Brazilian Football Confederation) Saad EC
9	FW	Michael Jackson	19 November 1963 (aged 32)			(Italian Football Federation) Torino CF
10	MF	Sissi (captain)	2 June 1967 (aged 29)			(Brazilian Football Confederation) Saad EC
11	FW	Roseli	7 September 1969 (aged 26)			(Japan Football Association) Takarazuka Bunnys
12	GK	Didi	22 September 1963 (aged 32)			(Brazilian Football Confederation) Saad EC
13	DF	Marisa	10 September 1966 (aged 29)			Unattached
14	FW	Tânia Maranhão	3 October 1974 (aged 21)			(Brazilian Football Confederation) Saad EC
15	MF	Nilda	25 March 1972 (aged 24)			(Brazilian Football Confederation) Saad EC
16	DF	Sônia	4 August 1968 (aged 27)			(Brazilian Football Confederation) Ítalo Serrano
19	MF	Kátia	18 February 1977 (aged 19)			(Brazilian Football Confederation) Saad EC

Unenrolled alternate players
No.	Pos.	Player	Date of birth (age)	Caps	Goals	Club
18	MF	Leda Maria	16 April 1966 (aged 30)			

Group play

Pos	Team	Pld	W	D	L	GF	GA	GD	Pts	Qualification
1	Norway	3	2	1	0	9	4	+5	7	Semi-finals
2	Brazil	3	1	2	0	5	3	+2	5	Semi-finals
3	Germany	3	1	1	1	6	6	0	4	
4	Japan	3	0	0	3	2	9	−7	0	

Source: FIFA
Rules for classification: Tiebreakers
21 July 1996
15:00

Norway	2–2	Brazil
Medalen 32'; Aarønes 68'	Report (FIFA)	Pretinha 57', 89'

Robert F. Kennedy Stadium, Washington, D.C.
Attendance: 45,946
Referee: José María García-Aranda (Spain)

23 July 1996
16:30

Brazil	2–0	Japan
Kátia 68'; Pretinha 78'	Report (FIFA)

Legion Field, Birmingham, Alabama
Attendance: 26,111
Referee: Ingrid Jonsson (Sweden)

25 July 1996
18:30

Brazil	1–1	Germany
Sissi 53'	Report (FIFA)	Wunderlich 4'

Legion Field, Birmingham, Alabama
Attendance: 28,319
Referee: Sonia Denoncourt (Canada)

Semifinal

July 28, 1996

China	3–2	Brazil
Qingmei 5'; Haiying 83', 90'	Report	Roseli 67'; Pretinha 72'

Sanford Stadium, Athens, Georgia
Attendance: 64,196
Referee: Ingrid Jonsson (Sweden)

Bronze medal match

August 1, 1996

Brazil	0–2	Norway
	Report	Aarønes 21', 25'

Sanford Stadium, Athens, Georgia
Attendance: 76,489
Referee: Ingrid Jonsson (Sweden)

== Handball ==
Summary

Key:

- ET – After extra time
- P – Match decided by penalty-shootout.

Team	Event	Group stage						Semifinal	Final / BM	
Team	Event	Opposition Score	Opposition Score	Opposition Score	Opposition Score	Opposition Score	Rank	Opposition Score	Opposition Score	Rank
Brazil men's	Men's tournament	Germany; L 20–30	Egypt; L 20–31	France; L 23–37	Spain; L 17–27	Algeria; D 20–20	6	—N/a	Kuwait; W 31–25	11

=== Men's tournament ===
Team roster

- Cezar Stelzner de Lima
- Edison Alves Freire
- Ivan Raimundo Pinheiro
- Marcos Antônio Cezar
- José Ronaldo do Nascimento
- Fausto Steinwandter
- Paulo Moratore
- Milton Fonseca Pelissari
- Daniel Pinheiro
- Agberto Correa de Matos
- Marcelo Minhoto Ferraz de Sampaio
- Winglitton Rocha Barros
- Ivan Bruno Maziero
- Rodrigo Hoffelder
- Osvaldo Inocente Filho
- Carlos Luciano Ertel

Group play

Pos	Team	Pld	W	D	L	GF	GA	GD	Pts	Qualification
1	France	5	4	0	1	145	114	+31	8 (Note: France 27–25 Spain)	Semifinals
2	Spain	5	4	0	1	114	97	+17	8	Semifinals
3	Egypt	5	3	0	2	113	103	+10	6 (Note: Germany 22–24 Egypt)	Fifth place game
4	Germany	5	3	0	2	121	112	+9	6	Seventh place game
5	Algeria	5	0	1	4	95	117	−22	1 (Note: Algeria 20–20 Brazil)	Ninth place game
6	Brazil	5	0	1	4	100	145	−45	1	Eleventh place game

Rules for classification: 1) points; 2) head-to-head points; 3) head-to-head goal difference; 4) head-to-head number of goals scored; 5) goal difference.
Notes:

24 July 1996; 20:45	Germany	30–20	Brazil	Georgia World Congress Center; Referees: Bojsen, Boehne (USA)
24 July 1996; 20:45	Löhr 7	(12–7)	Barros 4	Georgia World Congress Center; Referees: Bojsen, Boehne (USA)

25 July 1996; 19:00	Brazil	20–31	Egypt	Georgia World Congress Center; Referees: Al-Houli, Al-Enezi (KUW)
25 July 1996; 19:00	Barros 5	(10–15)	Waress 6	Georgia World Congress Center; Referees: Al-Houli, Al-Enezi (KUW)

27 July 1996; 20:45	France	37–23	Brazil	Georgia World Congress Center; Referees: Moelle Mabounda, Mvoula (CGO)
27 July 1996; 20:45	Volle 14	(16–10)	Pelissari 7	Georgia World Congress Center; Referees: Moelle Mabounda, Mvoula (CGO)

29 July 1996; 19:00	Brazil	17–27	Spain	Georgia World Congress Center; Referees: Bojsen, Boehne (USA)
29 July 1996; 19:00	Hoffelder 7	(10–12)	Urdangarín 6	Georgia World Congress Center; Referees: Bojsen, Boehne (USA)

31 July 1996; 19:00	Algeria	20–20	Brazil	Georgia World Congress Center; Referees: Moelle Mabounda, Mvoula (CGO)
31 July 1996; 19:00	Loukil, Nedjel Hammou 5	(9–11)	Pinheiro 5	Georgia World Congress Center; Referees: Moelle Mabounda, Mvoula (CGO)

Eleventh place game

2 August 1996; 10:00	Kuwait	25–31	Brazil	Georgia World Congress Center; Referees: Boehne, Bojsen (USA)
2 August 1996; 10:00	Al-Harbi, Al-Zadah 5	(13–16)	Nascimento 7	Georgia World Congress Center; Referees: Boehne, Bojsen (USA)

== Judo ==
Men

Athlete	Event	Round of 32	Round of 16	Quarterfinals	Semifinals	Final	Repechage 1	Repechage 2	Repechage 3	Bronze
Athlete	Event	Opposition Result	Opposition Result	Opposition Result	Opposition Result	Opposition Result	Opposition Result	Opposition Result	Opposition Result	Opposition Result
Alexandre García	-60 kg	Mukhtarov (UZB); L	Did not advance							
Henrique Guimarães	-65 kg	Benboudaoud (FRA); W	Lee (KOR); W	Csák (HUN); L	Did not advance		—N/a	MacKinnon (RSA); W	Netov (BUL); W	Laats (BEL); W (bronze)
Sebastian Pereira	-71 kg	Gagliano (FRA); W	Abanoz (TUR); W	Corkin (NZL); W	Kwak (KOR); L	Did not advance	—N/a			Pedro (USA); L
Flávio Canto	-78 kg	Volmar (HAI); W	Vatrican (MON); W	Koga (JPN); L	Did not advance		—N/a	Lo (TPE); W	Liparteliani (GEO); L	Did not advance
Edelmar Zanol	-86 kg	Tsmindashvili (GEO); W	Spittka (GER); L	Did not advance			Alimzhanov (KAZ); W	Gill (CAN); L	Did not advance	
Aurélio Miguel	-95 kg	Bender (ARG); W	Shakimov (KAZ); W	Felicite (MRI); W	Nastula (POL); L	Did not advance	—N/a			Sonnemans (NED); W (bronze)
Frederico Flexa	+95 kg	Kampita (THA); W	Kosorotov (RUS); L	Did not advance						

Women

Athlete	Event	Round of 32	Round of 16	Quarterfinals	Semifinals	Final	Repechage 1	Repechage 2	Repechage 3	Bronze
Athlete	Event	Opposition Result	Opposition Result	Opposition Result	Opposition Result	Opposition Result	Opposition Result	Opposition Result	Opposition Result	Opposition Result
Andrea Berti	-48 kg	Tortora (ITA); L	Did not advance							
Danielle Zangrando	-56 kg	Bye	Pekli (HUN); L	Did not advance						
Cristiane Parmigiano	-61 kg	Kobaş (TUR); L	Did not advance							
Rosicleia Campos	-66 kg	Cho (KOR); L	Did not advance				Wang (CHN); L	Did not advance		
Edinanci da Silva	+72 kg	Anno (JPN); W	Gundarenko (RUS); L	Did not advance			—N/a	Granicz (HUN); W	Hagn (GER); L	Did not advance

== Rowing ==
Men

Athlete	Event	Heats		Repechage		Semifinals		Final	
Athlete	Event	Time	Rank	Time	Rank	Time	Rank	Time	Rank
Marcelus dos Santos; Dirceu Marinho	Double sculls	6:49.92	3 R	6:56.93	3 SC/D	6:52.73	3 FC	6:47.12	15
André Costa; Oswaldo Kuster Neto; Alexandre Altair Soares; Giovanni Valentina	Quadruple sculls	6:36.60	5 R	6:12.86	5	Did not advance			

== Sailing ==
Men

Athlete	Event	Race											Score	Rank
Athlete	Event	1	2	3	4	5	6	7	8	9	10	11	Score	Rank
Yuri Taguti	Mistral	(37)	24	20	16	32	20	29	(37)	33	CAN	CAN	174	29
Christoph Bergmann	Finn	19	2	9	1	5	(20)	8	(21)	19	16	CAN	79	10
Rodrigo Amado; Leonardo Santos	470	26	32	23	24	18	(37)	25	25	12	18	(29)	200	29

Women

Athlete	Event	Race											Score	Rank
Athlete	Event	1	2	3	4	5	6	7	8	9	10	11	Score	Rank
Christina Mattoso	Mistral	19	24	23	23	(28)	(28)	28	28	28	CAN	CAN	173	26
Marcia Pellicano	Europe	(19)	(20)	17	16	9	8	7	16	11	13	10	107	16

Mixed

Athlete	Event	Race											Score	Rank
Athlete	Event	1	2	3	4	5	6	7	8	9	10	11	Score	Rank
Robert Scheidt	Laser	2	(9)	3	6	1	3	7	2	1	1	(57)	26	1st place, gold medalist(s)
Lars Grael; Henrique Pellicano	Tornado	(12)	(16)	1	8	6	8	2	5	3	7	3	43	3rd place, bronze medalist(s)
Torben Grael; Marcelo Ferreira	Star	1	6	2	(7)	1	4	(9)	2	6	3	CAN	25	1st place, gold medalist(s)
Daniel Glomb; Edson de Araújo Jr. Marcelo Reitz	Soling	(23)	17	20	(23)	17	14	19	23	19	6	—N/a	135	21

== Shooting ==
Men

Athlete	Events	Qualification		Final		Rank
Athlete	Events	Score	Rank	Score	Rank	Rank
Jean Labatut	Trap	119	=20	Did not advance		=20

== Swimming ==
Men

Athletes	Events	Heat		Finals	
Athletes	Events	Time	Rank	Time	Rank
Gustavo Borges	50 m freestyle	22.86	16 FB	22.92	12
Gustavo Borges	100 m freestyle	49.17	3 FA	49.02	3rd place, bronze medalist(s)
Gustavo Borges	200 m freestyle	1:49.00	7 FA	1:48.08	2nd place, silver medalist(s)
Fernando Scherer	50 m freestyle	22.68	7 FA	22.29	3rd place, bronze medalist(s)
Fernando Scherer	100 m freestyle	49.79	8 FA	49.57	5
Luiz Lima	400 m freestyle	3:56.43	18	Did not advance	
Luiz Lima	100 m freestyle	15:24.16	11	Did not advance	
Rogério Romero	100 m backstroke	56.94	24	Did not advance	
Rogério Romero	200 m backstroke	2:03.49	17 FB	2:03.20	15
André Teixeira	100 m butterfly	55.23	32	Did not advance	
Fernando Scherer; Alexandre Massura; André Cordeiro; Gustavo Borges	4 × 100 m freestyle relay	3:20.21	4 Q	3:18.30	4
Cassiano Leal; Luiz Lima; Fernando Saez; André Teixeira	4 × 200 m freestyle relay	7:28.82	10	Did not advance	

Women

Athletes	Events	Heat		Finals	
Athletes	Events	Time	Rank	Time	Rank
Gabrielle Rose	100 m freestyle	57.16	23	Did not advance	
Gabrielle Rose	100 m butterfly	1:01.22	10 FB	1:01.39	14
Gabrielle Rose	200 m individual medley	2:18.99	22	Did not advance	

== Table tennis ==
Men

Athletes	Event	Group stage				Round of 16	Quarterfinal	Semifinal	Final / BM	
Athletes	Event	Opposition Score	Opposition Score	Opposition Score	Rank	Opposition Score	Opposition Score	Opposition Score	Opposition Score	Rank
Hugo Hoyama	Singles	St. Louis (TRI); W 2–0	Kim (PRK); W 2–0	Persson (SWE); W 2–1	1 Q	Korbel (CZE); L 2–3	Did not advance			
Hugo Hoyama; Giuliano Peixoto	Doubles	Fetzner / Roßkopf (GER); L 0–2	Jindrak / Schlager (AUT); L 1–2	Huang / Ng (CAN); L 0–2	4	—N/a	Did not advance			

Women

Athletes	Event	Group stage				Round of 16	Quarterfinal	Semifinal	Final / BM	
Athletes	Event	Opposition Score	Opposition Score	Opposition Score	Rank	Opposition Score	Opposition Score	Opposition Score	Opposition Score	Rank
Monica Doti	Singles	Chan (HKG); L 0–2	Hugh-Yip (USA); L 0–2	Tóth (HUN); L 0–2	4	Did not advance				
Lyanne Kosaka	Singles	Ciosu (ROM); W 2–0	Kaffo (NGR); W 2–0	Tu (SUI); L 0–2	2	Did not advance				
Monica Doti; Lyanne Kosaka	Doubles	Kim / Park (KOR); L 0–2	Kaizu / Sato (JPN); L 0–2	Aganović / Boroš (CRO); L 0–2	4	—N/a	Did not advance			

== Tennis ==
Athlete	Event	Round of 64	Round of 32	Round of 16	Quarterfinals	Semifinals	Final / BM	
Athlete	Event	Opposition Score	Opposition Score	Opposition Score	Opposition Score	Opposition Score	Opposition Score	Rank
Fernando Meligeni	Men's singles	Pescosolido (ITA); W 6–4, 6–2	Costa (ESP); W 7–6, 6–4	Philippoussis (AUS); W 7–6, 4–6, 8–6	Olhovskiy (RUS); W 6–7, 7–5, 6–3	Bruguera (ESP); L 6–7, 2–6	Paes (IND); L 6–3, 2–6, 4–6	4
Miriam D'Agostini; Vanessa Menga	Women's doubles	—N/a	Barabanschikova / Zvereva (BLR); L 2–6, 3–6	Did not advance				

== Volleyball ==
=== Beach ===
Athlete	Event	Round 1	Round 2	Round 3	Quarterfinals	Classification Round 1	Classification Round 2	Classification Round 3	Classification Final 1	Classification Final 2	Semifinals	Final / BM	
Athlete	Event	Opposition Score	Opposition Score	Opposition Score	Opposition Score	Opposition Score	Opposition Score	Opposition Score	Opposition Score	Opposition Score	Opposition Score	Opposition Score	Rank
Emanuel; Zé Marco	Men's	—N/a	Jodard / Peginaud (FRA); W 1–0	Dodd / Whitmarsh (USA); L 0–1	Did not advance	—N/a		Brenha / Maia (POR); L 0–1	Did not advance				
Roberto Lopes; Franco Neto	Men's	—N/a	Palinek / Pakosta (CZE); W 1–0	Bosma / Jiménez (ESP); L 0–1	Did not advance	—N/a		Kvalheim / Maaseide (NOR); L 0–1	Did not advance				
Sandra Pires; Jackie Silva	Women's	—N/a	Kaize / Radavu (INA); W 1–0	Fenwick / Spring (AUS); W 1–0	Rodrigues / Samuel (BRA); W 1–0	—N/a					Fontana / Hanley (USA); W 1–0	Rodrigues / Samuel (BRA); W 2–0	1st place, gold medalist(s)
Mônica Rodrigues; Adriana Samuel	Women's	—N/a	Solazzi / Turetta (ITA); W 1–0	Fontana / Hanley (USA); W 1–0	Pires / Silva (BRA); L 0–1	—N/a				Fujita / Takahashi (JPN); W 1–0	Cook / Pottharst (AUS); W 1–0	Pires / Silva (BRA); L 0–1	2nd place, silver medalist(s)

=== Indoor ===
==== Men's tournament ====
Team roster

- Gilson Bernardo
- Nalbert Bitencourt
- Giovane Gávio
- Antonio Carlos Gouveia
- Mauricio Lima
- Fábio Marcelino
- Marcelo Negrão
- Cássio Pereira
- Max Pereira
- Alexandre Samuel
- Carlos Schwanke
- Paulo André Silva
- Head coach:
  José Roberto Guimarães

Group play

Pos	Team	Pld	W	L	Pts	SW	SL	SR	SPW	SPL	SPR	Qualification
1	Cuba	5	4	1	9	12	5	2.400	233	191	1.220	Quarterfinals
2	Brazil	5	3	2	8	10	6	1.667	210	187	1.123	Quarterfinals
3	Bulgaria	5	3	2	8	10	8	1.250	225	212	1.061	Quarterfinals
4	Argentina	5	3	2	8	9	9	1.000	222	225	0.987	Quarterfinals
5	United States	5	2	3	7	10	9	1.111	241	233	1.034	
6	Poland	5	0	5	5	1	15	0.067	151	234	0.645	

Date		Score		Set 1	Set 2	Set 3	Set 4	Set 5	Total
21 Jul	Argentina	3–1	Brazil	9–15	15–8	16–14	15–6		55–43
23 Jul	Bulgaria	3–0	Brazil	15–11	15–13	15–8			45–32
25 Jul	Brazil	3–0	Poland	15–7	15–11	15–8			45–26
27 Jul	Brazil	3–0	United States	15–11	15–11	15–7			45–29
29 Jul	Brazil	3–0	Cuba	15–11	15–10	15–11			45–32

Quarterfinal

Date		Score		Set 1	Set 2	Set 3	Set 4	Set 5	Total
31 Jul	Brazil	2–3	FR Yugoslavia	6–15	5–15	15–8	16–14	10–15	52–67

5th-8th place classification game

Date		Score		Set 1	Set 2	Set 3	Set 4	Set 5	Total
1 Aug	Brazil	3–1	Argentina	15–10	15–3	13–15	15–9		58–37

5th place game

Date		Score		Set 1	Set 2	Set 3	Set 4	Set 5	Total
2 Aug	Cuba	0–3	Brazil	12–15	14–16	14–16			40–47

==== Women's tournament ====
Team roster

- Ana Ida Alvares
- Leila Barros
- Ericleia Bodziak
- Hilma Caldeira
- Ana Paula Connelly
- Marcia Cunha
- Virna Dias
- Ana Moser
- Ana Flavia Sanglard (c)
- Hélia Souza
- Sandra Suruagy
- Fernanda Venturini
- Head coach:
  Bernardo Rezende

Group play

Pos	Team	Pld	W	L	Pts	SW	SL	SR	SPW	SPL	SPR	Qualification
1	Brazil	5	5	0	10	15	1	15.000	238	121	1.967	Quarterfinals
2	Russia	5	4	1	9	12	4	3.000	217	140	1.550	Quarterfinals
3	Cuba	5	3	2	8	10	6	1.667	196	156	1.256	Quarterfinals
4	Germany	5	2	3	7	7	9	0.778	163	191	0.853	Quarterfinals
5	Canada	5	1	4	6	3	14	0.214	156	239	0.653	
6	Peru	5	0	5	5	2	15	0.133	129	252	0.512	

Date		Score		Set 1	Set 2	Set 3	Set 4	Set 5	Total	Report
20 Jul	Brazil	3–0	Peru	15–7	15–1	15–5			45–13	Report
22 Jul	Cuba	0–3	Brazil	11–15	10–15	4–15			25–45	Report
24 Jul	Brazil	3–0	Russia	15–3	15–11	15–13			45–27	Report
26 Jul	Canada	0–3	Brazil	6–15	6–15	11–15			23–45	Report
28 Jul	Brazil	3–1	Germany	15–4	13–15	15–6	15–8		58–33	Report

Quarterfinal

Date		Score		Set 1	Set 2	Set 3	Set 4	Set 5	Total	Report
30 Jul	South Korea	0–3	Brazil	4–15	2–15	10–15			16–45	Report

Semifinal

Date		Score		Set 1	Set 2	Set 3	Set 4	Set 5	Total	Report
1 Aug	Cuba	3–2	Brazil	5–15	15–8	10–15	15–13	15–12	60–63	Report

Bronze medal game

Date		Score		Set 1	Set 2	Set 3	Set 4	Set 5	Total	Report
3 Aug	Russia	2–3	Brazil	13–15	15–4	14–16	15–8	13–15	70–58	Report

== Weightlifting ==
Athlete	Event	Snatch		Clean & jerk		Total	Rank
Athlete	Event	Result	Rank	Result	Rank	Total	Rank
Emilson Dantas	Men's −99 kg	152.5	=20	182.5	21	335	21

== See also ==
- Brazil at the 1995 Pan American Games
