= Basketball at the 1996 Summer Olympics =

14th Olympic Basketball Tournament
- Atlanta 1996

Tournament details
- Olympics: 1996 Summer Olympics
- Host nation: United States
- City: Atlanta
- Duration: July 20 – August 4

Men's tournament
- Teams: 12
Medals
Gold medalists	United States
Silver medalists	Yugoslavia
Bronze medalists	Lithuania

Women's tournament
- Teams: 12
Medals
Gold medalists	United States
Silver medalists	Brazil
Bronze medalists	Australia

Tournaments
← Barcelona 1992	Sydney 2000 →

Basketball contests at the 1996 Olympic Games was the fourteenth appearance of the sport of basketball as an official Olympic medal event. It held from July 20 to August 4, 1996. Games took place in the Morehouse College Gymnasium and in the Georgia Dome.

== Medalists ==
Event	Gold	Silver	Bronze
Men's	United States; Charles Barkley; Penny Hardaway; Grant Hill; Hakeem Olajuwon; Karl Malone; Reggie Miller; Shaquille O'Neal; Gary Payton; Scottie Pippen; Mitch Richmond; David Robinson; John Stockton	FR Yugoslavia; Dejan Tomašević; Miroslav Berić; Dejan Bodiroga; Željko Rebrača; Predrag Danilović; Vlade Divac; Aleksandar Đorđević; Saša Obradović; Žarko Paspalj; Zoran Savić; Nikola Lončar; Milenko Topić	Lithuania; Arvydas Sabonis; Rimas Kurtinaitis; Darius Lukminas; Saulius Štombergas; Eurelijus Žukauskas; Šarūnas Marčiulionis; Mindaugas Žukauskas; Gintaras Einikis; Artūras Karnišovas; Rytis Vaišvila; Tomas Pačėsas
Women's	United States; Teresa Edwards; Dawn Staley; Ruthie Bolton; Sheryl Swoopes; Jennifer Azzi; Lisa Leslie; Carla McGhee; Katy Steding; Katrina Felicia McClain; Rebecca Lobo; Venus Lacy; Nikki McCray	Brazil; Hortência Marcari Oliva; Maria Angélica Gonçalves da Silva; Adriana Aparecida Santos; Leila Sobral; Maria Paula Silva; Janeth Arcain; Roseli Gustavo; Marta Sobral; Silvia Luz; Alessandra Santos de Oliveira; Cintia Santos; Claudia Maria Pastor	Australia; Robyn Maher; Allison Cook; Sandy Brondello; Michele Timms; Shelley Sandie; Trisha Fallon; Michelle Chandler; Fiona Robinson; Carla Boyd; Jenny Whittle; Rachael Sporn; Michelle Brogan

With the U.S. men's team winning the gold medal, Scottie Pippen would become the first person to win an NBA championship and Olympic gold medal in the same year twice, after having played for the Chicago Bulls in the NBA Finals. He had previously played with the Bulls in the 1992 and later that year, for the "Dream Team" at the Barcelona Olympics.

== Qualification ==
An NOC may enter up to one men's team with 12 players and up to one women's team with 12 players. The reigning world champions and the host country qualify automatically, as do the winners of the five continental championships, plus the runner-up and third place from the Americas, the runner-up from Asia and the second through fourth places from the Europe tournament. For the women's tournament, the extra teams consisted of the runner-up from the Americas, in addition to the second and third places from Asia and Europe.

=== Men ===
Africa	Americas	Asia	Europe	Oceania	Automatic qualifiers
Angola	Puerto Rico; Argentina; Brazil	China; South Korea	(Federal Republic of Yugoslavia) FR Yugoslavia; Lithuania; Croatia; Greece	Australia	United States – World champions and Olympic hosts

=== Women ===
Africa	Americas	Asia	Europe	Oceania	Automatic qualifiers
Zaire	Canada; Cuba	China; South Korea; Japan	Ukraine; Italy; Russia	Australia	Brazil – World champions United States – Olympic hosts

== Format ==
- Twelve teams are split into two preliminary round groups of six teams each.
- The top four teams from both groups qualify for the knockout stage.
- Fifth and sixth places from each group form an additional bracket to decide 9th–12th places in the final ranking.
- In the quarterfinals, the matchups are as follows: A1 vs. B4, A2 vs. B3, A3 vs. B2 and A4 vs. B1.
  - The four eliminated from the quarterfinals form an additional bracket to decide 5th–8th places in the final ranking.
- The winning teams from the quarterfinals meet in the semifinals as follows: A1/B4 vs. A3/B2 and A2/B3 vs. A4/B1.
- The winning teams from the semifinals contest the gold medal. The losing teams contest the bronze.

Tie-breaking criteria:

1. Head to head results
2. Goal average (not the goal difference) between the tied teams
3. Goal average of the tied teams for all teams in its group

== Men's tournament ==
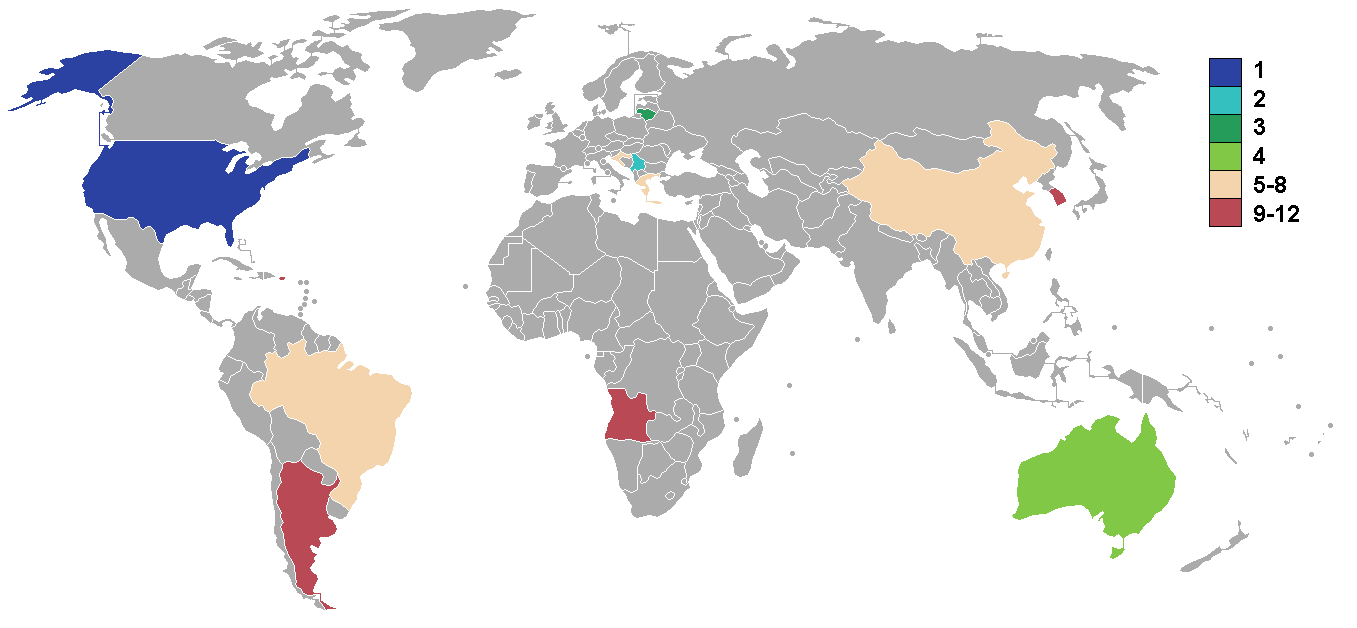
1996 men's teams.

=== Preliminary round ===
The four best teams from each group advanced to the quarterfinal round.

==== Group A ====
Qualified for the quarterfinals

Team	W	L	PF	PA	PD	Pts	Tie
United States	5	0	522	345	+177	10	
Lithuania	3	2	427	354	+73	8	1W–0L
Croatia	3	2	422	386	+36	8	0W–1L
China	2	3	360	502	−142	7	1W–0L
Argentina	2	3	351	396	−45	7	0W–1L
Angola	0	5	280	379	−99	5	

==== Group B ====
Qualified for the quarterfinals

Team	W	L	PF	PA	PD	Pts
(Federal Republic of Yugoslavia) FR Yugoslavia	5	0	478	364	+114	10
Australia	4	1	492	438	+54	9
Greece	3	2	402	416	−14	8
Brazil	2	3	498	494	+4	7
Puerto Rico	1	4	447	465	−18	6
South Korea	0	5	422	562	−140	5

=== Knockout stage ===
Quarterfinals (July 30)
B1	(Federal Republic of Yugoslavia) FR Yugoslavia	128
A4	China	61
A2	Lithuania	99
B3	Greece	66
B2	Australia	73
A3	Croatia	71
A1	United States	98
B4	Brazil	75

Semifinals (August 1)
B1	(Federal Republic of Yugoslavia) FR Yugoslavia	66
A2	Lithuania	58
B2	Australia	73
A1	United States	101

Gold medal (August 3)
B1	(Federal Republic of Yugoslavia) FR Yugoslavia	69
A1	United States	95
Bronze medal (August 3)
A2	Lithuania	80
B2	Australia	74

=== Statistical leaders ===
Statistic	Name	Total	Per game/Pct.
Points	(Brazil) Oscar Schmidt	219	27.4
Rebounds	(Lithuania) Arvydas Sabonis	81	10.1
Assists	(Croatia) Toni Kukoč	56	7
Steals	(United States) Grant Hill	18	3
Blocks	3 tied	7	
3-point field goals	(Brazil) Oscar Schmidt	40	.381
Free throws	(Australia) Andrew Gaze	52	.839

== Women's tournament ==
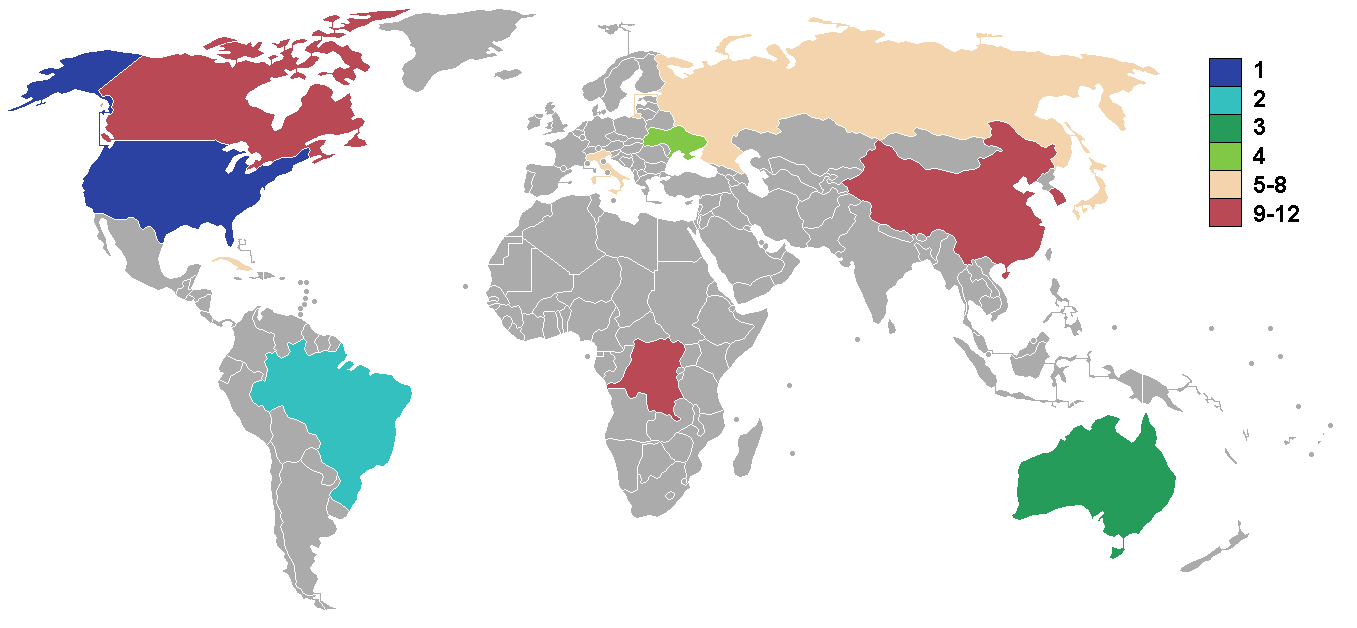
1996 women's teams.

=== Preliminary round ===
The four best teams from each group advanced to the quarterfinal round.

==== Group A ====
Qualified for the quarterfinals

Team	W	L	PF	PA	PD	Pts
Brazil	5	0	424	360	+64	10
Russia	4	1	378	342	+36	9
Italy	3	2	330	309	+21	8
Japan	2	3	365	396	−31	7
China	1	4	347	378	−31	6
Canada	0	5	293	352	−59	5

==== Group B ====
Qualified for the quarterfinals

Team	W	L	PF	PA	PD	Pts	Tie
United States	5	0	507	339	+168	10	
Ukraine	3	2	354	358	−4	8	1W–0L
Australia	3	2	369	319	+50	8	0W–1L
Cuba	2	3	365	377	−12	7	1W–0L
South Korea	2	3	347	389	−42	7	0W–1L
Zaire	0	5	287	447	−160	5	

=== Knockout stage ===
Quarterfinals (July 31)
B1	Brazil	101
A4	Cuba	69
A2	Ukraine	59
B3	Italy	50
B2	Russia	70
A3	Australia	74
A1	United States	108
B4	Japan	93

Semifinals (August 2)
B1	Brazil	81
A2	Ukraine	60
A3	Australia	71
A1	United States	93

Gold medal (August 4)
B1	Brazil	87
A1	United States	111
Bronze medal (August 4)
A2	Ukraine	56
A3	Australia	66

=== Statistical leaders ===
Statistic	Name	Total	Per game/Pct.
Points	(Cuba) Yamilé Martínez	164	20.5
Rebounds	(Russia) Elena Baranova	105	13.1
Assists	(United States) Teresa Edwards	64	8
Steals	(United States) Ruthie Bolton	23	2.9
Blocks	(Russia) Elena Baranova	19	2.4
3-point field goals	(Brazil) Maria Paula Silva	23	.451
Free throws	(Russia) Elena Baranova	37	.841

== Final standings ==
Rank	Men				Women			
Rank	Team	Pld	W	L	Team	Pld	W	L
1st place, gold medalist(s)	United States	8	8	0	United States	8	8	0
2nd place, silver medalist(s)	(Federal Republic of Yugoslavia) FR Yugoslavia	8	7	1	Brazil	8	7	1
3rd place, bronze medalist(s)	Lithuania	8	5	3	Australia	8	5	3
4th	Australia	8	5	3	Ukraine	8	4	4
Eliminated at the quarterfinals
5th	Greece	8	5	3	Russia	8	6	2
6th	Brazil	8	3	5	Cuba	8	3	5
7th	Croatia	8	4	4	Japan	8	3	5
8th	China	8	2	6	Italy	8	3	5
Preliminary round 5th placers
9th	Argentina	7	4	3	China	7	3	4
10th	Puerto Rico	7	2	5	South Korea	7	3	4
Preliminary round 6th placers
11th	Angola	7	1	6	Canada	7	1	6
12th	South Korea	7	0	7	Zaire	7	0	7
