= Jhon Arias =

Jhon Arias may refer to:

- Jhon Arias (cyclist) (born 1969), Colombian cyclist
- Jhon Arias (footballer) (born 1997), Colombian footballer
