= Barb Broen-Ouelette =

Canadian volleyball player (born 1964)

Personal information
- Born: 25 October 1964 (age 62); Edmonton, Alberta, Canada
- Height: 176 cm (5 ft 9 in)

Barb Broen-Ouelette (born 25 October 1964) is a Canadian former volleyball player. She competed in the women's tournament at the 1984 Summer Olympics. She also competed in the beach volleyball tournament at the 1996 Summer Olympics.
