= Alges Maasikmets =

Estonian cyclist

Personal information
- Born: 18 August 1968 (age 58) Tallinn, then part of Estonian SSR, Soviet Union

Cycling career
- Sport: Cycling

Alges Maasikmets (born 18 August 1968) is an Estonian cyclist. He competed in the men's cross-country mountain biking event at the 1996 Summer Olympics.
