= Beach volleyball at the 1996 Summer Olympics – Women's tournament =

Women's beach volleyball at the Games of the XXVI Olympiad
- Venue: Atlanta Beach
- Dates: July 23–27
- Competitors: 36 from 13 nations

Medalists
1st place, gold medalist(s)		Sandra Pires; Jackie Silva	Brazil
2nd place, silver medalist(s)		Mônica Rodrigues; Adriana Samuel	Brazil
3rd place, bronze medalist(s)		Natalie Cook; Kerri Pottharst	Australia

This page shows the results of the inaugural Women's Beach Volleyball Tournament at the 1996 Summer Olympics in Atlanta, Georgia, held from July 23 to July 27, 1996. There were a total number of eighteen participating couples.

== Results ==
=== Winner’s Bracket, First-round ===
- Kaize/Yudhani, Indonesia (No. 17-seeded team) def. Malowney/Oullette, Canada (16), 15-10 (44 minutes)
- Prawerman/Lesage, France (18) def. Hernandez/Soto, Mexico (15) 15-11 (28)

=== Winner’s Bracket, Second-round ===
- Fenwick/Spring, Australia (9) def. Fujita/Takahashi, Japan (8), 15-10 (26)
- Rodrigues/Samuel, Brazil (5) def. Solazzi/Turetta, Italy (12) 17-15 (57)
- Fontana/Hanley, United States (4) def. Berntsen/Hestad, Norway (13) 15-4 (41)
- Castro/Richardson, United States (3) def. Kadijk/Van de Ven, Netherlands (14) 15-8 (34)
- Cook/Pottharst, Australia (6) def. Cooper/Glover, Great Britain (11) 15-4 (38)
- Buhler/Müsch, Germany (7) def. Ishizaka/Nakano, Japan (10) 15-8 (36)
- Silva/Pires, Brazil (1) def. Kaize/Yudhani, Indonesia (17) 15-2 (26)
- McPeak/Reno, United States (2) def. Prawerman/Lesage, France (18) 15-4 (33)

=== Winner’s Bracket, Third-round ===
- Silva/Pires, Brazil (1) def. Fenwick/Spring, Australia (9), 15-13 (45)
- Rodrigues/Samuel, Brazil (5) def. Fontana/Hanley, United States (4), 15-10 (55)
- Cook/Pottharst, Australia (6) def. Castro/Richardson, United States (3), 15-7 (38)
- McPeak/Reno, United States (2) def. Buhler/Müsch, Germany (7), 15-6 (36)

=== Winner’s Bracket, Fourth-round ===
- Silva/Pires, Brazil (1) def. Rodrigues/Samuel, Brazil (5), 15-4 (33)
- Cook/Pottharst, Australia (6) def. McPeak/Reno, United States (2), 15-13 (65)

=== Loser’s Bracket, First-round ===
- Losers eliminated, place 17th
  - Prawerman/Lesage, France (18) def. Malowney/Oullette, Canada (16), 15-13 (68)
  - Kaize/Yudhani, Indonesia (17) def. Hernandez/Soto, Mexico (15) 15-11 (29)

=== Loser’s Bracket, Second-round ===
- Losers eliminated, place 13th
  - Cooper/Glover, Great Britain (11) def. Kadijk/Van de Ven, Netherlands (14), 15-12 (50)
  - Berntsen/Hestad, Norway (13) def. Solazzi/Turetta, Italy (12) 15-11 (42)
  - Ishizaka/Nakano, Japan (10) def. Prawerman/Lesage, France (18) (26)
  - Fujita/Takahashi, Japan (8) def. Kaize/Yudhani, Indonesia (17), 15-0 (18)

=== Loser’s Bracket, Third-round ===
- Losers eliminated, place ninth
  - Fontana/Hanley, United States (4) def. Ishizaka/Nakano, Japan (10), 15-6 (32)
  - Fenwick/Spring, Australia (9) def. Cooper/Glover, Great Britain (11), 15-12 (38)
  - Buhler/Müsch, Germany (7) def. Berntsen/Hestad, Norway (13), 15-9 (45)
  - Fujita/Takahashi, Japan (8) def. Castro/Richardson, United States (3), 15-11 (49)

=== Loser’s Bracket, Fourth-round ===
- Losers eliminated, place seventh
  - Fontana/Hanley, United States (4) def. Fenwick/Spring, Australia (9), 15-6 (37)
  - Fujita-Takahashi, Japan (8) def. Buhler/Müsch, Germany (7), 15-4 (32)

=== Loser’s Bracket, Fifth-round ===
- Losers eliminated, place fifth
  - Fontana/Hanley, United States (4) def. McPeak/Reno, United States (2), 15-10 (49)
  - Rodrigues/Samuel, Brazil(5) def. Fujita/Takahashi, Japan (8), 15-6 (45)

=== Semi-finals ===
- Silva/Pires, Brazil (1) def. Fontana/Hanley, United States (4), 15-8 (39)
- Rodrigues/Samuel, Brazil (5) def. Cook/Pottharst, Australia (6), 15-3 (27)

=== Bronze medal match ===
- Cook/Pottharst, Australia (6) def. Fontana/Hanley, United States (4), 12-11 and 12-7 (111)

=== Gold Medal match ===
- Silva/Pires, Brazil (1) def. Rodrigues/Samuel, Brazil (5), 12-11 and 12-6 (69)

== Final ranking ==
RANK	NAME ATHLETES	SEED
1st place, gold medalist(s)	Sandra Pires and Jackie Silva (BRA)	1
2nd place, silver medalist(s)	Mônica Rodrigues and Adriana Samuel (BRA)	5
3rd place, bronze medalist(s)	Natalie Cook and Kerri Pottharst (AUS)	6
4.	Barbra Fontana and Linda Hanley (USA)	4
5.	Holly McPeak and Nancy Reno (USA)	2
5.	Sachiko Fujita and Yukiko Takahashi (JPN)	8
7.	Beate Bühler and Danja Müsch (GER)	7
7.	Liane Fenwick and Anita Spring (AUS)	9
9.	Gail Castro and Deb Richardson (USA)	3
9.	Yuki Ishizaka and Peko Nakano (JPN)	10
9.	Audrey Cooper and Amanda Glover (GBR)	11
9.	Merita Berntsen and Ragni Hestad (NOR)	13
13.	Annamaria Solazzi and Consuelo Turetta (ITA)	12
13.	Debora Schoon-Kadijk and Lisette van de Ven (NED)	14
13.	Eta Kaize and Timy Yudhani Rahayu (INA)	17
13.	Brigitte Lesage and Anabelle Prawerman (FRA)	18
17.	Velia Eguiluz and Mayra Huerta (MEX)	15
17.	Barb Broen Ouellette and Margo Malowney (CAN)	16

== See also ==
- Men's Beach Volleyball Tournament
- Volleyball at the Summer Olympics
