= Sônia (footballer) =

Brazilian footballer

Personal information
- Full name: Sônia Maria Roque da Costa
- Date of birth: 4 August 1968 (age 58)
- Place of birth: Rio Branco, Acre, Brazil
- Position: Defender

Senior career*
Years	Team	Apps	(Gls)
1996	Ítalo Serrano		

International career
1996	Brazil		
- * Club domestic league appearances and goals

Sônia Maria Roque da Costa, commonly known as Sônia (born 4 August 1968), is a Brazilian former football defender who played for the Brazil women's national football team.

She competed at the 1996 Summer Olympics, playing four matches. At the club level, she played for Ítalo Serrano.

== See also ==
- Brazil at the 1996 Summer Olympics
