= Warren Sallenback =

Canadian cyclist

Personal information
- Born: 16 July 1966 (age 60)

Cycling career
- Sport: Cycling

Warren Sallenback (born 16 July 1966) is a Canadian cyclist. He competed in the men's cross-country mountain biking event at the 1996 Summer Olympics.
