= 1995 European Beach Volleyball Championships =

International beach volleyball competition

The 1995 European Beach Volleyball Championships were held in August, 1995 in Saint-Quay-Portrieux, France. It was the third official edition of the men's event, which started in 1993, while the women competed for the second time.

== Men's competition ==
RANK	FINAL RANKING
1st place, gold medalist(s)	Marko Klok and Michiel van der Kuip (NED)
2nd place, silver medalist(s)	Milan Džavoronok and Václav Fikar (CZE)
3rd place, bronze medalist(s)	Piero Antonini and Dio Lequaglie (ITA)

== Women's competition ==
RANK	FINAL RANKING
1st place, gold medalist(s)	Cordula Borger and Beate Paetow (GER)
2nd place, silver medalist(s)	Merita Berntsen and Ragni Hestad (NOR)
3rd place, bronze medalist(s)	Cristiana Parenzan and Lucilla Perrotta (ITA)
