= Maria Angélica =

Brazilian basketball player (born 1966)

Olympic medal record

Women's basketball

Representing Brazil
Silver medal – second place	1996 Atlanta	Team competition

Maria Angélica Gonçalves da Silva (born January 10, 1966), commonly known as Branca, is a Brazilian former basketball player. She was born in Osvaldo Cruz, Brazil. Branca played as a guard and stood 5 feet 7 inches (170 cm) tall, weighing 150 pounds (68 kg). She represented Brazil in the 1996 Summer Olympics and won a team silver medal.
