= Margo Malowney =

Canadian beach volleyball player (born 1967)

Personal information
- Born: 8 August 1967 (age 58); Saint John, New Brunswick, Canada

Sport
- Sport: Beach volleyball

Margo Malowney (born 8 August 1967) is a Canadian beach volleyball player. She competed in the women's tournament at the 1996 Summer Olympics.

Malowney stayed after her playing career active in the sport of beach volleyball as a marketeer and experience sharer. She is a marketing and communication executive and educator in MBA and CSR. Malowney is also involved in foster care for rescue dogs. She is also an author.

She is the aunt of volleyball player Amanda Malowney.
