= Gail Castro =

American beach volleyball player (born 1957)

Personal information
- Born: November 12, 1957 (age 67); Glendale, California, United States
- Height: 5 ft 11 in (180 cm)

Sport
- Sport: Beach volleyball

Gail Castro (born November 12, 1957) is an American former beach volleyball player. Between 1982 and 1990 she played 190 tournaments. After finishing second in the American trials with partner Deb Richardson, they competed in the women's tournament at the 1996 Summer Olympics. In 1997 she played her 11th WPVA tour. She has also played with Gayle Stammer.

She played indoor volleyball at Los Angeles Valley College and Cal State Long Beach.
