= Latauro Chávez =

Argentine cyclist

Lautaro Chávez
Personal information
- Born: 26 May 1966 (age 60)

Cycling career
- Sport: Cycling

Lautaro Chávez (born 26 May 1966) is an Argentine cyclist. He competed in the men's cross-country mountain biking event at the 1996 Summer Olympics.
