= Don Myrah =

American cyclist

Personal information
- Born: January 17, 1966 (age 60) Oakland, California, United States

Cycling career
- Sport: Cycling

Don Myrah (born January 17, 1966) is an American cyclist. He competed in the men's cross-country mountain biking event at the 1996 Summer Olympics.
