= Pavel Camrda =

Czech cyclist

Personal information
- Born: 3 December 1968 (age 57) Tábor, Czechoslovakia
- Height: 1.79 m (5 ft 10 in)
- Weight: 69 kg (152 lb)

Cycling career
- Sport: Cycling
- Disciplines: Cyclo-cross; Mountain bike
- Role: Rider

Pavel Camrda (born 3 December 1968) is a Czech former cyclist. He competed in the men's cross-country mountain biking event at the 1996 Summer Olympics. In 1994, he placed second on the Wangen round of the UCI Cyclo-cross World Cup.
