= Velia Eguiluz =

Mexican beach volleyball player (born 1965)

Personal information
- Nationality: Mexican
- Born: 1 April 1965 (age 60)

Sport
- Sport: Beach volleyball

Velia Eguiluz (born 1 April 1965) is a Mexican beach volleyball player. She competed in the women's tournament at the 1996 Summer Olympics.
