= Marko Klok =

Dutch volleyball player

Personal information
- Born: 14 March 1968 (age 58); Monnickendam, North Holland, Netherlands
- Height: 194 cm (6 ft 4 in)

Volleyball information
- Position: Outside hitter
- Number: 7 (1992); 3 (2004)

National team
1991–2008	Netherlands
Honours
Men's volleyball
Representing the Netherlands
Olympic Games
Silver medal – second place	1992 Barcelona	Indoor
World Championship
Silver medal – second place	1994 Greece	Indoor
World League
Bronze medal – third place	1998 Milan
European Championship
Silver medal – second place	1993 Finland
Bronze medal – third place	1991 Germany
Men's beach volleyball
European Championships
Gold medal – first place	1995 Saint-Quay

Marko Klok (Dutch pronunciation: [ˈmɑrkoː ˈklɔk], born 14 March 1968) is a volleyball player from the Netherlands who represented his native country at two Summer Olympics, starting in 1992 in Barcelona. There he won the silver medal as a part of the Dutch national men's team, and later took ninth at the 2004 Summer Olympics in Athens. He played a total of 378 international matches for the Dutch volleyball team.

== Beach volleyball ==
Klok and partner Michiel van der Kuip won the 1995 European Beach Volleyball Championships.

== Coaching ==
In November 2021 he became the national coach of the women's teams of Beach Volleyball Team Netherlands (BTN).
