= Peko Nakano =

Japanese beach volleyball player (born 1965)

Peko Nakano OLY
Personal information
- Nationality: Japanese
- Born: 10 March 1965 (age 61) Tokyo, Japan

Sport
- Sport: Beach volleyball

Peko Nakano (born 10 March 1965) is a Japanese beach volleyball player. She competed in the women's tournament at the 1996 Summer Olympics.
