= Gary Foord =

British cyclist (born 1970)

Personal information
- Born: 14 September 1970 (age 56) Leicester, England

Cycling career
- Sport: Cycling

Gary Foord (born 14 September 1970) is a British former cyclist. He competed in the men's cross-country mountain biking event at the 1996 Summer Olympics.
