= Alister Martin =

Irish cyclist

Personal information
- Born: 15 January 1965 (age 61) Dungannon, Northern Ireland

Cycling career
- Sport: Cycling
- Discipline: Cross-country mountain biking

Amateur team
- Ards Cycling Club

Alister Martin (born 15 January 1965) is an Irish cyclist. Born in Northern Ireland, he attended university in Cambridge. Martin, who represented the Ards Cycling Club in club competitions, represented Ireland in the men's cross-country mountain biking event at the 1996 Summer Olympics.

== See also ==
- Martin Earley
