= Lisette van de Ven =

Dutch beach volleyball player (born 1969)

Personal information
- Nationality: Dutch
- Born: 7 August 1969 (age 56); Deventer, Netherlands

Sport
- Sport: Beach volleyball

Lisette van de Ven (born 7 August 1969) is a Dutch beach volleyball player. She competed in the women's tournament at the 1996 Summer Olympics.
