= Roger Persson =

Swedish cyclist

Personal information
- Born: 1 June 1974 (age 52) Falkenberg, Sweden

Cycling career
- Sport: Cycling

Roger Persson (born 1 June 1974) is a Swedish cyclist. He competed in the men's cross-country mountain biking event at the 1996 Summer Olympics.
