= Sławomir Barul =

Polish cyclist

Personal information
- Born: 28 August 1964 (age 62) Opoczno, Poland

Cycling career
- Sport: Cycling

Sławomir Barul (born 28 August 1964) is a Polish cyclist. He competed in the men's cross-country mountain biking event at the 1996 Summer Olympics.
