= Merita Berntsen =

Norwegian beach volleyball player

Merita Berntsen Mol
Personal information
- Nationality: Norwegian
- Born: 24 February 1969 (age 57) Bergen, Norway

Sport
- Sport: Beach volleyball
Medal record
Representing Norway
Women's beach volleyball
European Championship
Silver medal – second place	1995 Saint-Quay-Portrieux	Team

Merita Berntsen Mol (born 24 February 1969) is a Norwegian beach volleyball player, born in Bergen. She competed in the women's tournament at the 1996 Summer Olympics in Atlanta, with teammate Ragni Hestad.

She won a silver medal at the 1995 European Beach Volleyball Championships along with Ragni Hestad.

== Personal life ==
Born on 24 February 1969, Merita Berntsen is married to volleyball coach Kåre Mol. Among their children is Olympic champion Anders Mol.
