= Ragni Hestad =

Norwegian beach volleyball player

Personal information
- Nationality: Norwegian
- Born: 5 September 1968 (age 58) Bergen, Norway

Sport
- Sport: Beach volleyball
Medal record
Representing Norway
Women's beach volleyball
European Championship
Silver medal – second place	1995 Saint-Quay-Portrieux	Team

Ragni Hestad (born 5 September 1968) is a Norwegian beach volleyball player, born in Bergen. She competed in the women's tournament at the 1996 Summer Olympics in Atlanta, with teammate Merita Berntsen.

She won a silver medal at the 1995 European Beach Volleyball Championships along with Merita Berntsen Mol.

== Personal life ==
Hestad was born in Bergen on 5 September 1968.
