= Cycling at the 1996 Summer Olympics – Men's cross-country =

Men's cross-country at the Games of the XXVI Olympiad
- Venue: Georgia International Horse Park, Conyers
- Date: 30 July
- Competitors: 43 from 26 nations
- Winning time: 2:17.38

Medalists
1st place, gold medalist(s)		Bart Brentjens; Netherlands
2nd place, silver medalist(s)		Thomas Frischknecht; Switzerland
3rd place, bronze medalist(s)		Miguel Martinez; France

These are the official results of the Men's Mountainbike Race at the 1996 Summer Olympics in Atlanta. There were a total number of 43 participants, with seven non-finishers, in this inaugural Olympic event over 47.7 kilometres, held on July 30, 1996. The mountain biking events were held at the Georgia International Horse Park in Conyers, Georgia, located 30 miles (48 km) east of Atlanta.

== Final classification ==
Rank	Cyclist	NOC	Time
	Bart Brentjens	Netherlands	2:17.38
	Thomas Frischknecht	Switzerland	2:20:14
	Miguel Martinez	France	2:20:36
4.	Christophe Dupouey	France	2:25:03
5.	Daniele Pontoni	Italy	2:25:08
6.	José Andrés Brenes	Costa Rica	2:25:51
7.	Lennie Kristensen	Denmark	2:26:02
8.	Luca Bramati	Italy	2:26:05
9.	Cadel Evans	Australia	2:26:15
10.	Ralph Berner	Germany	2:27:45
11.	Rune Høydahl	Norway	2:28:16
12.	Gary Foord	Great Britain	2:29:10
13.	Warren Sallenback	Canada	2:29:57
14.	Beat Wabel	Switzerland	2:32:17
15.	David Baker	Great Britain	2:32:30
16.	Robert Woods	Australia	2:33:14
17.	Roel Paulissen	Belgium	2:33:53
18.	Jan Østergaard	Denmark	2:34:30
19.	David Juarez	United States	2:35:15
20.	Don Myrah	United States	2:35:50
21.	Roger Persson	Sweden	2:37:17
22.	Jokin Mújika	Spain	2:41:15
23.	Jhon Arias	Colombia	2:42:04
24.	Radovan Fořt	Czech Republic	2:42:43
25.	Martin Earley	Ireland	2:43:56
26.	Kyoshi Miura	Japan	2:45:03
27.	Márcio Ravelli	Brazil	2:45:16
28.	Ernst Denifl	Austria	2:45:34
29.	Marek Galiński	Poland	2:45:54
30.	Peter Hric	Slovakia	2:45:54
31.	Andreas Hestler	Canada	2:46:45
32.	Alister Martin	Ireland	2:47:46
33.	Pavel Camrda	Czech Republic	2:49:09
34.	Juan Arias	Colombia	2:50:44
35.	Ivanir Lopes	Brazil	2:53:29
36.	Sławomir Barul	Poland	2:53:56
—	Latauro Chávez	Argentina	DNF
—	Rory Gonsalves	Antigua and Barbuda	DNF
—	Alges Maasikmets	Estonia	DNF
—	Mike Kluge	Germany	DNF
—	Roberto Lezaun	Spain	DNF
—	Marcel Arntz	Netherlands	DNF
—	Peter Van Den Abeele	Belgium	DNF

== See also ==
- Women's Cross Country Race
