= Deb Richardson =

American beach volleyball player (born 1961)

Personal information
- Born: February 17, 1961 (age 65) Minneapolis, Minnesota, U.S.
- Height: 6 ft 1 in (185 cm)

Sport
- Sport: Beach volleyball

Deb Richardson (born February 17, 1961) is an American beach volleyball player. After finishing second in the American trials with her partner Gail Castro; they competed in the women's tournament at the 1996 Summer Olympics. In 1997 she started her ninth season in the WPVA tour, playing with Linda Chisholm.

She played collegiately at the University of Alaska-Anchorage.
