= Brigitte Lesage =

French beach volleyball player (born 1964)

Personal information
- Born: 18 June 1964 (age 61); Mulhouse, France
- Height: 192 cm (6 ft 4 in)
- Weight: 78 kg (172 lb)

Sport
- Country: France
- Sport: Beach volleyball
- Club: ASPTT Mulhouse

Brigitte Lesage (born 18 June 1964) is a French beach volleyball player. She competed in the women's tournament at the 1996 Summer Olympics.
