= Jhon Arias (cyclist) =

Colombian cyclist

Personal information
- Born: 13 June 1969 (age 57) San Vicente, Colombia

Cycling career
- Sport: Cycling

Jhon Arias (born 13 June 1969) is a Colombian cyclist. He competed in the men's cross-country mountain biking event at the 1996 Summer Olympics.
