= Caio Eduardo de Mello Cazziolato =

Brazilian basketball player

Personal information
- Born: 18 September 1974 (age 50); Casa Branca, Brazil

Caio Eduardo de Mello Cazziolato, also commonly known as Caio Cazziolato, or simply as "Caio" (born 18 September 1974) is a Brazilian former professional basketball player. With the senior Brazilian national basketball team, Cazziolato competed at the 1996 Summer Olympics, and the 1998 FIBA World Cup.
