= Daniel Pinheiro (handballer) =

Brazilian handball player (born 1972)

Personal information
- Born: 20 April 1972 (age 53); São Paulo, Brazil

Sport
- Sport: Handball

Daniel Pinheiro (born 20 April 1972) is a Brazilian former handball player. He competed in the men's tournament at the 1996 Summer Olympics.
