= Marta Sobral =

Brazilian basketball player (born 1964)

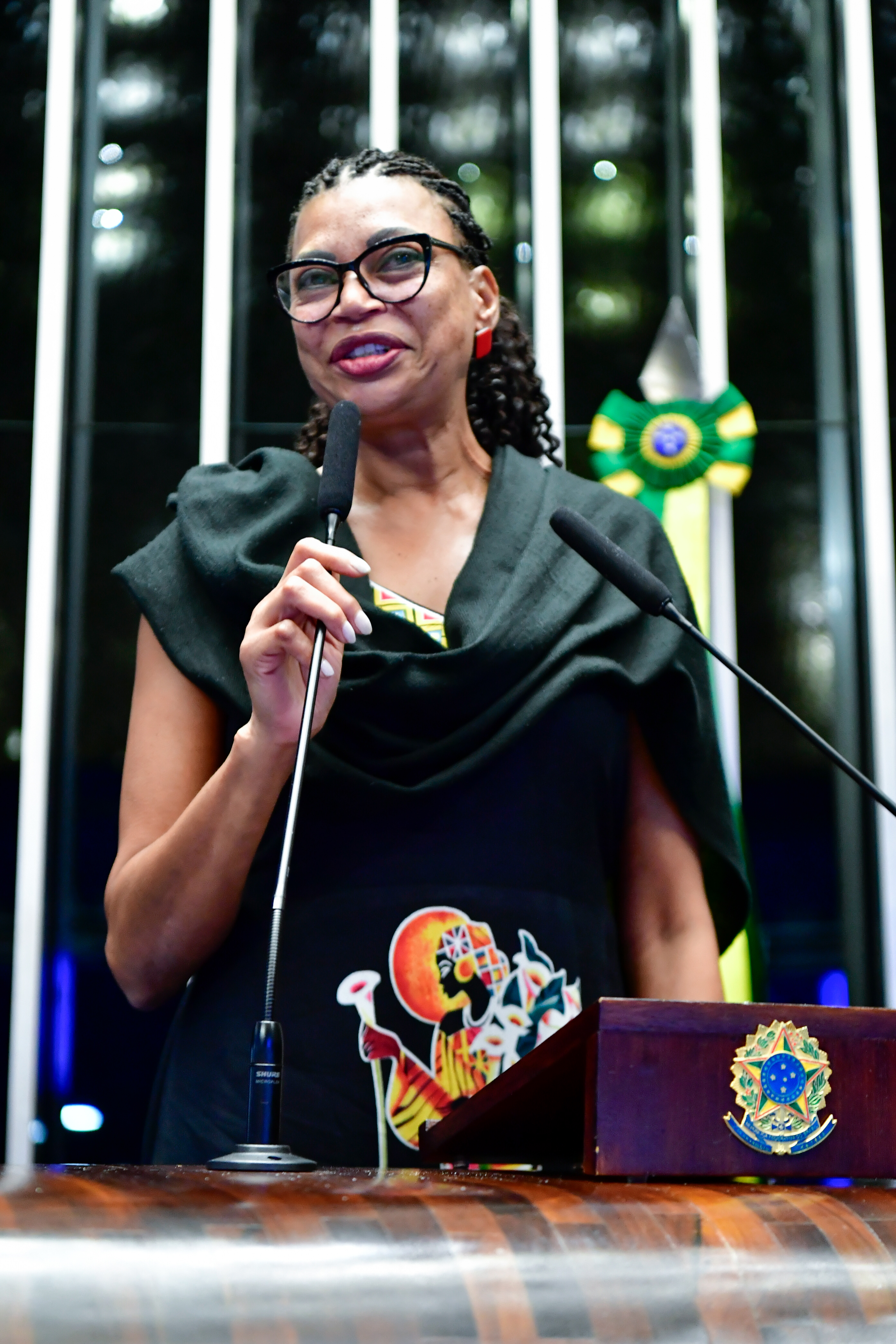
- 2023 by Waldemir Barreto

Personal information
- Full name: Marta de Souza Sobral Freitas
- Born: 23 March 1964 (age 62) São Paulo, Brazil
- Height: 190 cm (6 ft 3 in)
- Weight: 74 kg (163 lb)
Medal record
Women's Basketball
Representing Brazil
Olympic Games
Silver medal – second place	1996 Atlanta	Team competition
Bronze medal – third place	2000 Sydney	Team competition

Marta de Souza Sobral Freitas (born 23 March 1964 in São Paulo) is a former Brazilian female basketball player. Sobral, while a member of the Brazil women's national basketball team, participated in three Summer Olympics (1992, 1996, 2000), and won a medal in two of them (1996 and 2000). She is the sister of fellow Brazilian basketball Olympian Leila Sobral.
