= Liane Fenwick =

Australian beach volleyball player

Personal information
- Nationality: Australian
- Born: 10 June 1971 (age 54) Sydney, Australia

Sport
- Sport: Beach volleyball

Liane Fenwick (born 10 June 1971 in Sydney, Australia) is an Australian beach volleyball player who competed in the women's tournament of the 1996 Summer Olympics alongside Anita Spring.
