= Rodrigo Hoffelder =

Brazilian handball player (born 1970)

Personal information
- Born: 14 September 1970 (age 54); Joaçaba, Brazil

Sport
- Sport: Handball

Rodrigo Hoffelder (born 14 September 1970) is a Brazilian handball player. He competed at the 1992 Summer Olympics and the 1996 Summer Olympics.
