= Maria Paula Silva =

Brazilian basketball player

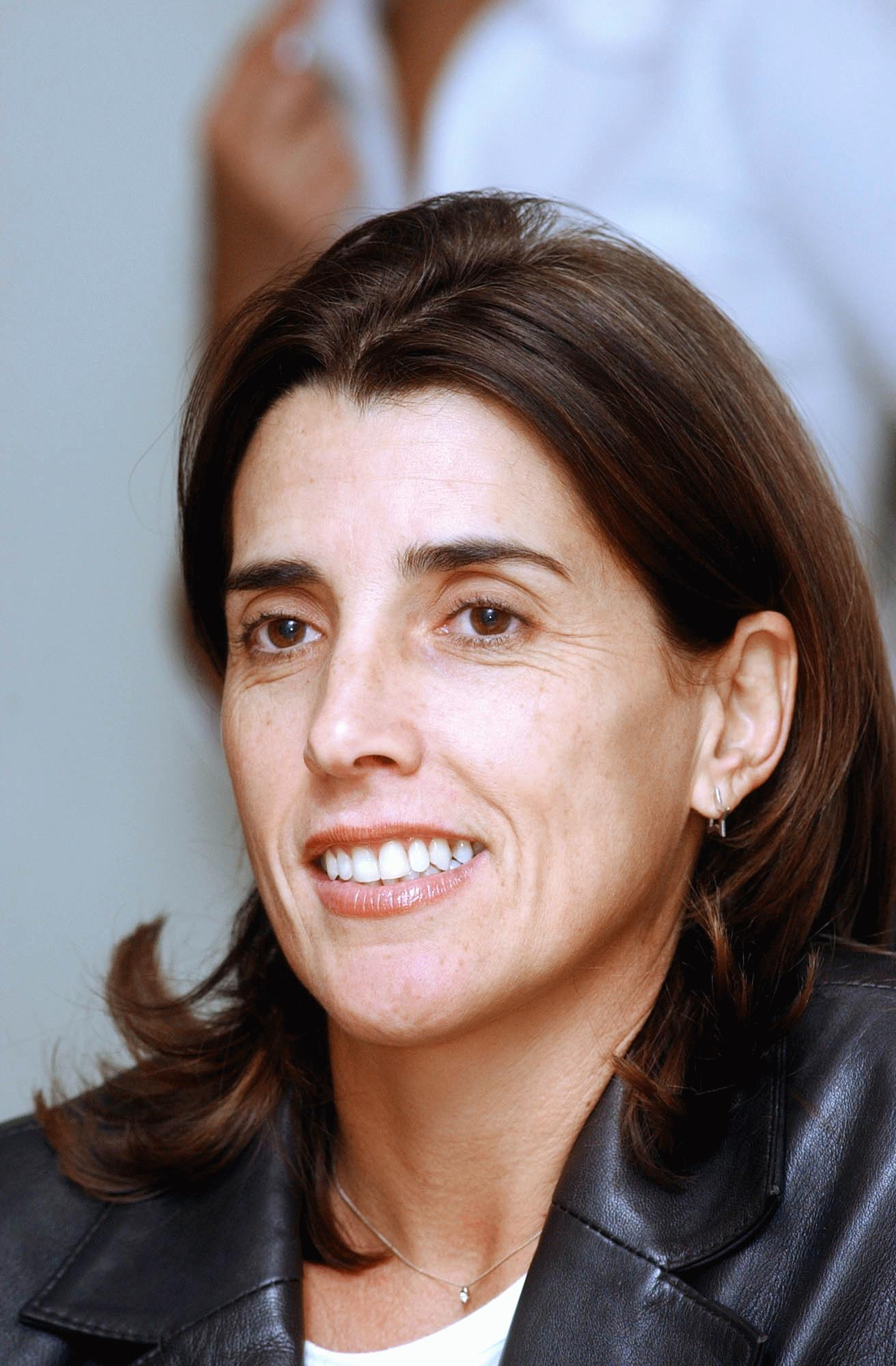

Personal information
- Born: March 11, 1962 (age 64) Osvaldo Cruz, São Paulo, Brazil
- Listed height: 174 cm (5 ft 9 in)
- Listed weight: 60 kg (132 lb)
- Women's Basketball Hall of Fame
- FIBA Hall of Fame
Medals
Women's basketball
Representing Brazil
Olympic Games
Silver medal – second place	1996 Atlanta	National team
World Championship
Gold medal – first place	1994 Australia	National team
Pan American Games
Gold medal – first place	1991 Havana	National team
Silver medal – second place	1987 Indianapolis	National team
Bronze medal – third place	1983 Caracas	National team

Maria Paula Gonçalves da Silva (born March 11, 1962, in Osvaldo Cruz, São Paulo), nicknamed "Magic Paula", is a retired Brazilian women's basketball player. She is considered one of the greatest players in her country, along with Hortência Marcari and Janeth Arcain. For Brazil women's national basketball team, Paula is the second biggest scorer, with 723 points (behind Hortência) and holds the record for caps with 45 games, being in two Olympic Games and six World Championships.

Paula became a member of the Women's Basketball Hall of Fame in 2006 and of the FIBA Hall of Fame in 2013.

== Career ==
Paula begun playing basketball at the age of ten, and in 1974, was invited to join Assis Tênis Clube. One year and a half later, the team folded and Paula went to Jundiaí to play for Colégio Divino Salvador, and a few months later, was drafted for the first time by the national team despite being only fourteen. In 1988, Paula went to play in Spain, but an injured knee and difficulties of adaptation brought her back to Brazil in 1991.

In 1979, she helped her team to a fourth place at the Pan American Games, held in Puerto Rico. During the 1983 World Championship hosted by Brazil, reporter Juarez Araújo compared Paula's play to Magic Johnson, leading to her long-lasting nickname of "Magic Paula". That same year, Paula and the national team improved their previous Pan American performance by winning a bronze medal at the Venezuela games, and, in 1987, went yet one more step further by winning a silver medal at the 1987 Indianapolis Pan Americans. In 1991, Paula and the Brazilian women's national basketball team won the gold medal at that year's Pan American tournament, held in Cuba, being the player which most impressed Cuban president Fidel Castro.

In 1992, Paula helped her team qualify for the Olympic Games for the first time. Brazil finished in seventh place at the Barcelona Olympics.

In 1993, Paula went to Associação Atlética Ponte Preta, where she played along with Hortência and won the World Championship for clubs. After discussions with Hortência, Paula returned to Piracicaba.

In 1994, Paula won the women's world basketball championship in Australia, making Brazil the only country other than the Soviet Union or the United States to win the title (Australia became the fourth in 2006), and was named the most valuable player of that tournament. In 1996, she won a silver medal at the Atlanta Olympics, and retired from the national team after winning the 1997 FIBA Americas Championship for Women. She still played for clubs before retiring in 2000.

After retirement, Paula became an entrepreneur, director of the Centro Olímpico do Ibirapuera, and worked for a while in the Brazilian Ministry of Sports. She also commentated the basketball tournaments of the 2011 Pan American Games and 2012 Summer Olympics for Rede Record, the NBA playoffs and All-Star Game for Space in 2014 and 2015, and the 2016 Summer Olympics for ESPN Brasil.

== See also ==
- Basketball in South America
