= Linda Hanley =

American beach volleyball player (born 1960)

Personal information
- Nationality: American
- Born: 8 June 1960 (age 65) Laguna Beach, California

Sport
- Sport: Beach volleyball

Linda Hanley (born 8 June 1960) is an American beach volleyball player, born in Laguna Beach, California. She competed in the women's tournament at the 1996 Summer Olympics in Atlanta, with teammate Barbra Fontana.
