= Cezar Stelzner de Lima =

Brazilian handball player (born 1974)

Personal information
- Born: 14 August 1974 (age 50); São Miguel do Oeste, Brazil

Sport
- Sport: Handball

Cezar Stelzner de Lima (born 14 August 1974) is a Brazilian handball player. He competed in the men's tournament at the 1996 Summer Olympics.
