= Cláudia Maria Pastor =

Brazilian basketball player (born 1971)

Olympic medal record

Women's basketball

Representing Brazil
Silver medal – second place	1996 Atlanta	Team competition

Cláudia Maria Pastor (born 15 July 1971) is a Brazilian former basketball player who competed in the 1996 Summer Olympics.
