= Ivanir Lopes =

Brazilian cyclist

Personal information
- Born: 8 December 1971 (age 54)

Cycling career
- Sport: Cycling

Ivanir Lopes (born 8 December 1971) is a Brazilian cyclist. He competed in the men's cross-country mountain biking event at the 1996 Summer Olympics.
