= Edison Alves Freire =

Brazilian handball player (born 1969)

Personal information
- Nickname: Testão
- Born: 18 November 1969 (age 55); Belo Horizonte, Brazil

Sport
- Sport: Handball

Edison Alves Freire (born 18 November 1969), also known as Testão, is a Brazilian handball player. He competed in the men's tournament at the 1996 Summer Olympics.
