= Consuelo Turetta =

Italian beach volleyball player

Personal information
- Nationality: Italian
- Born: 7 September 1961 (age 63); Lozzo Atestino, Italy
- Height: 174 cm (5 ft 9 in)

Sport
- Sport: Beach volleyball

Consuelo Turetta (born 7 September 1961) is an Italian former beach volleyball player. She competed in the women's tournament at the 1996 Summer Olympics.
