= Anita Spring =

Australian beach volleyball player

Personal information
- Full name: Anita Spring-Palm
- Born: 26 June 1965 (age 59); Bundaberg, Queensland, Australia
- Height: 172 cm (5 ft 8 in)
- Weight: 71 kg (157 lb)

Sport
- Country: Australian
- Sport: Beach volleyball

Anita Spring (born 26 June 1965 in Bundaberg, Queensland) is an Australian beach volleyball player who competed in the women's tournament of the 1996 Summer Olympics alongside Liane Fenwick.
