= Márcio Ravelli =

Brazilian cyclist

Personal information
- Born: 27 February 1972 (age 54) São Paulo, Brazil

Cycling career
- Sport: Cycling

Márcio Ravelli (born 27 February 1972) is a Brazilian cyclist. He competed in the men's cross-country mountain biking event at the 1996 Summer Olympics.
