= Roseli Gustavo =

Brazilian basketball player (born 1971)

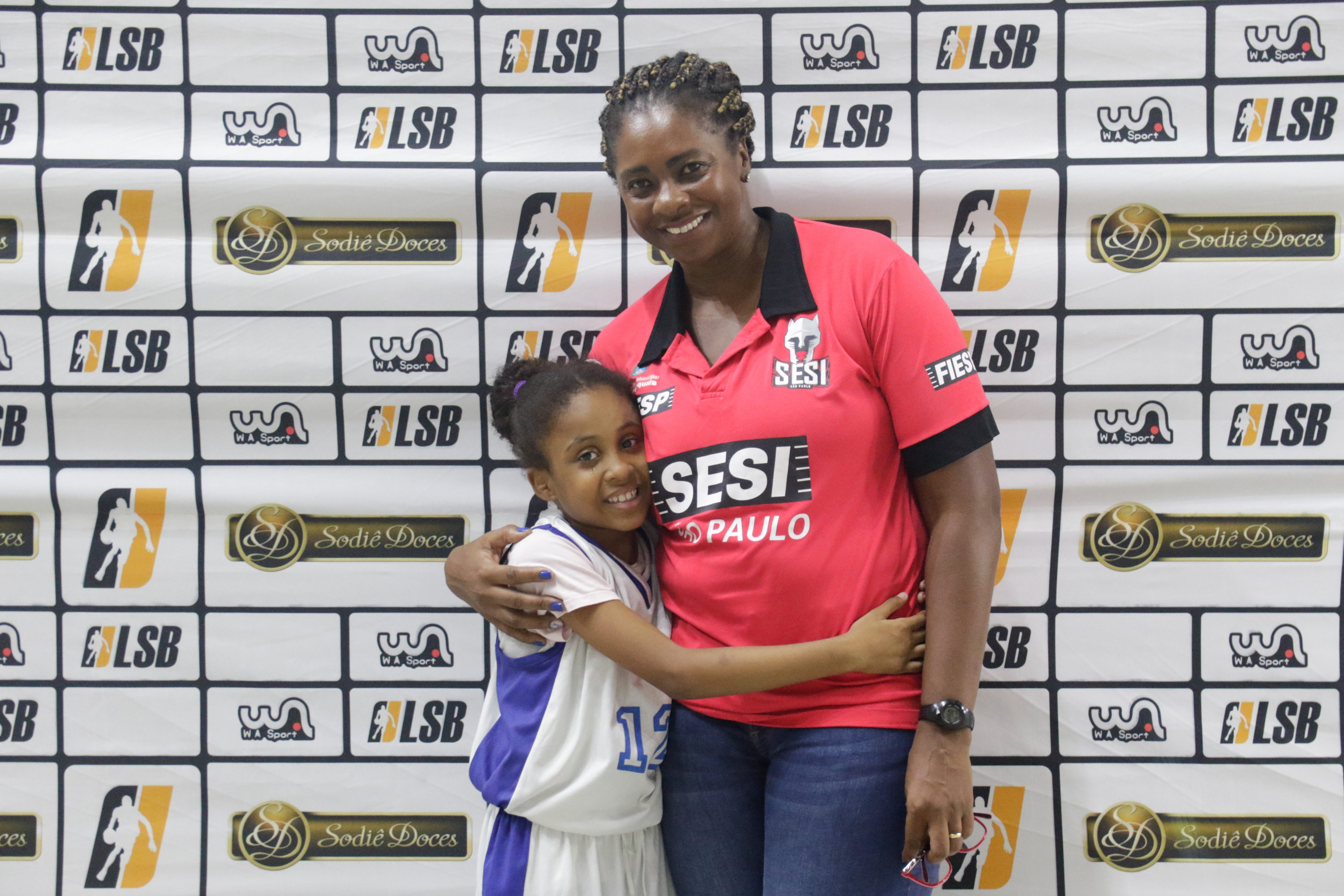
- Roseli in 2019
Medals
Women's basketball
Representing Brazil
Olympic Games
Silver medal – second place	1996 Atlanta	Team
World Championship
Gold medal – first place	1994 Australia	Team
Pan American Games
Gold medal – first place	1991 Havana	Team

Roseli do Carmo Gustavo (born 25 July 1971 in Araraquara) is a Brazilian former basketball player who competed in the 1996 Summer Olympics.
