= Leila Sobral =

Brazilian basketball player (born 1974)

Medal record

Women's basketball

Representing Brazil

Olympic Games
Silver medal – second place	1996 Atlanta	Team competition

World Championships
Gold medal – first place	1994 Australia	Team competition

Leila de Souza Sobral Freitas (born November 22, 1974, in São Paulo) is a basketball player from Brazil, who with the women's national team won the 1994 FIBA World Championship for Women in Australia and the silver medal at the 1996 Summer Olympics in Atlanta, Georgia. Her sister Marta Sobral was also part of the national team.

== Career statistics ==
Legend
GP	Games played	GS	Games started	MPG	Minutes per game	RPG	Rebounds per game
APG	Assists per game	SPG	Steals per game	BPG	Blocks per game	PPG	Points per game
TO	Turnovers per game	FG%	Field-goal percentage	3P%	3-point field-goal percentage	FT%	Free-throw percentage
**Bold**	Career best	°	League leader

=== WNBA ===
==== Regular season ====
Year	Team	GP	GS	MPG	FG%	3P%	FT%	RPG	APG	SPG	BPG	TO	PPG
1998	Washington	15	0	4.7	.240	.273	.667	.7	.4	.3	.1	.6	1.7
