= Hortência Marcari =

Brazilian basketball player (born 1959)

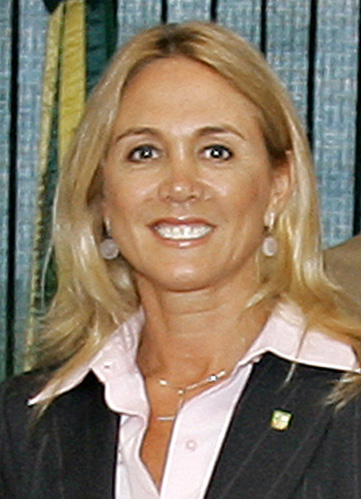
- Macari in 2006

Personal information
- Born: September 23, 1959 (age 67) Potirendaba, São Paulo (state), Brazil
- Listed height: 5 ft 9 in (1.75 m)
- Listed weight: 132 lb (60 kg)
- Position: Shooting guard
- Basketball Hall of Fame
- Women's Basketball Hall of Fame
- FIBA Hall of Fame
Medals
Women's basketball
Representing Brazil
Olympic Games
Silver medal – second place	1996 Atlanta	National team
World Championship
Gold medal – first place	1994 Australia	National team
Pan American Games
Gold medal – first place	1991 Havana	National team
Silver medal – second place	1987 Indianapolis	National team
Bronze medal – third place	1983 Caracas	National team

Hortência Maria de Fátima Marcari (born September 23, 1959) is a former basketball player who is often considered to be one of the greatest female basketball players in Brazil, along with Paula. Marcari is a member of the Women's Basketball Hall of Fame (inducted in 2002), the Naismith Memorial Basketball Hall of Fame (inducted in 2005), and FIBA Hall of Fame (inducted in 2007). She is known in her country as Hortência, and her nickname is The Queen.

== Biography ==
Born in Potirendaba, São Paulo, Brazil, Hortência is of Italian background, her grandparents having moved to Brazil from that European nation. Hortência's father was a laborer.

When Hortência was ten years old, her family moved to São Paulo, and Hortência became interested in sports. Her family disapproved of her choice to play sports, since her father had been disabled on the field and they wanted her to work bringing home part of the earnings her father used to. But they eventually gave up trying to keep her from her favorite activity.

At the age of thirteen, in 1972, Hortência began to play street basketball at her school gym. One year later, she was spotted by Waldir Paga Perez, coach of Brazil women's national basketball team. Hortência was playing for the national team at age fifteen.

Hortência began to play as a professional with the São Caetano Esporte Clube, becoming an instant celebrity in Brazil. Over the years, she played for Associação Prudentina, C.A Minercal, C.A Consteca/Sedox, NCNB Ponte Preta and ADC Seara until she retired from professional basketball in 1996, one year before Arcain began playing in the United States' WNBA. Hortência was a teen idol to many female basketball fans in the cities where she played, particularly at Prudentina where, during an interview with Jeremy Larner, she was stopped many times by autograph seekers on her way from her house to a game.

Hortência's first international experience came in 1976, when Brazil's women's national basketball team won the South American juvenile championship in Paraguay. In 1979, she helped her team to a fourth place at the Pan American Games held in Puerto Rico. In 1983, Hortência and the national team improved their previous Pan American performance by winning a bronze medal at the Venezuela games, while in 1987 Hortência and the Brazilian Women's national team went one step further by winning a silver medal at the 1987 Indianapolis Pan American Games. In 1991, Hortência and the Brazilian women's national basketball team won the gold medal at that year's Pan American tournament held in Cuba. In 1992, Hortência helped her team to a bronze medal at the Pre-Olympic competition held in Spain, returning later that year to that country to play in the Olympic Games for the first time. Brazil settled for seventh place at the Barcelona Olympics.

Finally in 1994, Hortência won the women's world basketball championship in Australia, making Brazil the only country other than the Soviet Union or the United States to win the title (Australia became the fourth in 2006). The semi-final game against the USA is considered one of the greatest in history, and Brazil shocked the world with the victory. After the silver medal in the next Olympic Games, Marcari retired from international competition.

Apart from those competitions, she also played in Peru, Singapore, Malaysia, Bulgaria and South Korea.

Despite the fact her team did not qualify for the 1984 Olympics in Los Angeles, Hortência was featured on those games' official program, in an article named The Queen.

On 5 August 2016, she became the penultimate torch bearer for the 2016 Summer Olympics torch relay, being the link between Gustavo Kuerten who brought the torch into the Olympic Stadium, and the cauldron lighter, Vanderlei de Lima, during the Opening Ceremonies.

Her son, João Victor, participated in dressage competitions at the 2016 Summer Olympics.

== See also ==
- List of basketball players who have scored 100 points in a single game
- List of Brazilians
- Women's Basketball Hall of Fame
