= Osvaldo Cruz, São Paulo =

Osvaldo Cruz
- Municipality
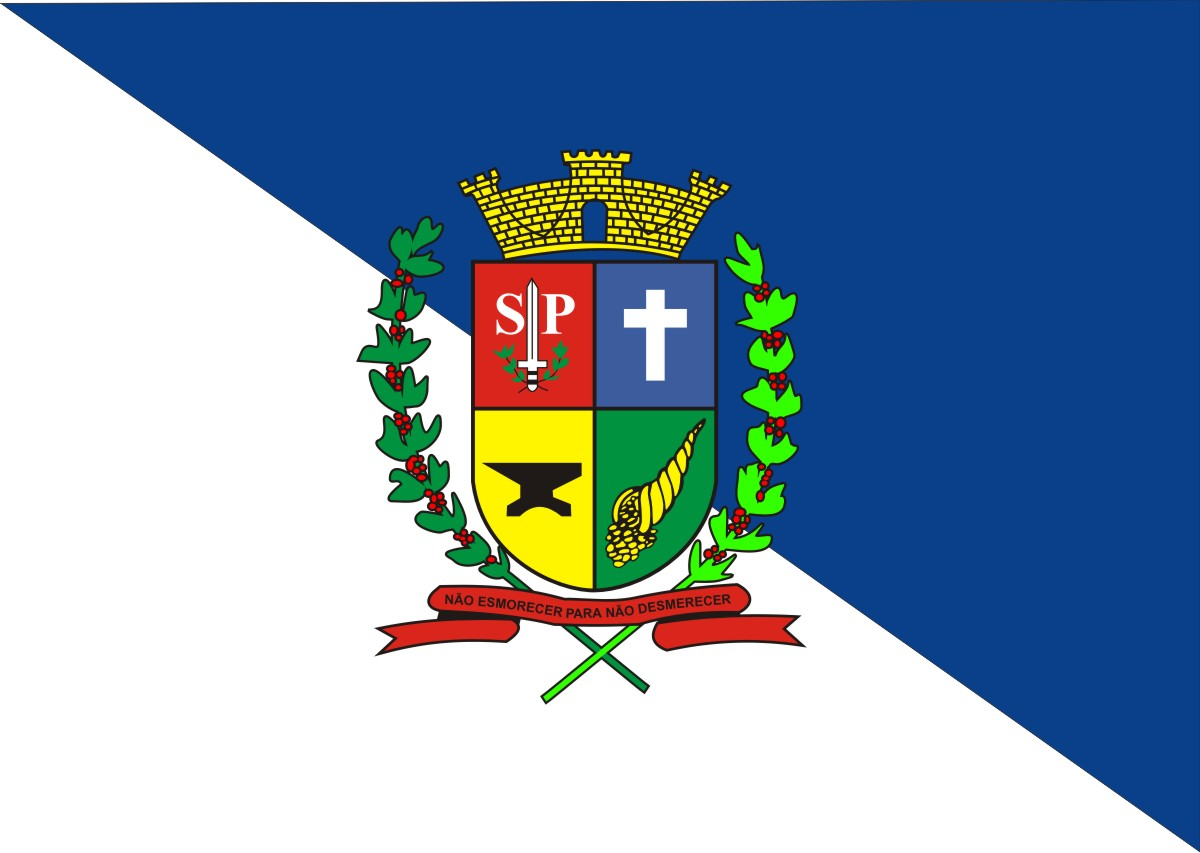
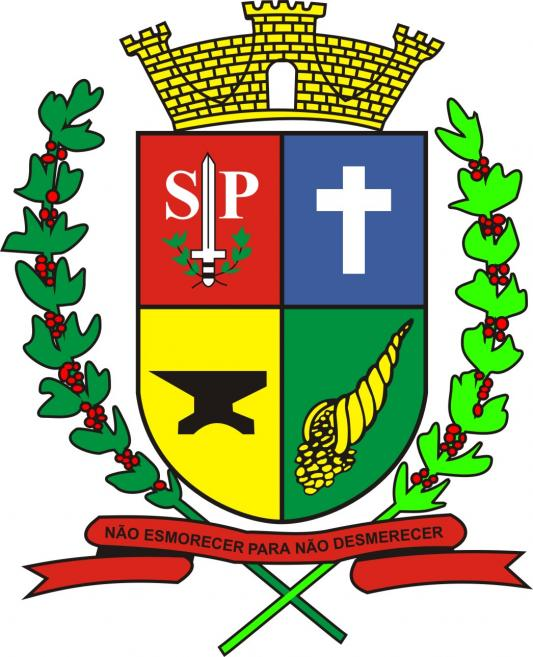
- Flag Coat of arms

- Location in São Paulo state

- Location in Brazil
- Coordinates: 21°47′48″S 50°52′43″W
- Country: Brazil
- Region: Southeast
- State: São Paulo

Area
  - Total: 248 km^{2} (96 sq mi)

Population (2020)
  - Total: 33,000
  - Density: 130/km^{2} (340/sq mi)
- Time zone: UTC−3 (BRT)

Osvaldo Cruz is a municipality in the Brazilian state of São Paulo. The population is 33,000 (2020 est.) in an area of 248 km^{2} (96 sq mi). The elevation is 485 m.

== History ==
It was founded in 1941 by Max Wirth, a Swiss citizen who immigrated to Brazil searching for new agricultural lands. First named "Nova Califórnia" the small village was created on Guataporanga Farm.

The municipality was created by state law in 1944.

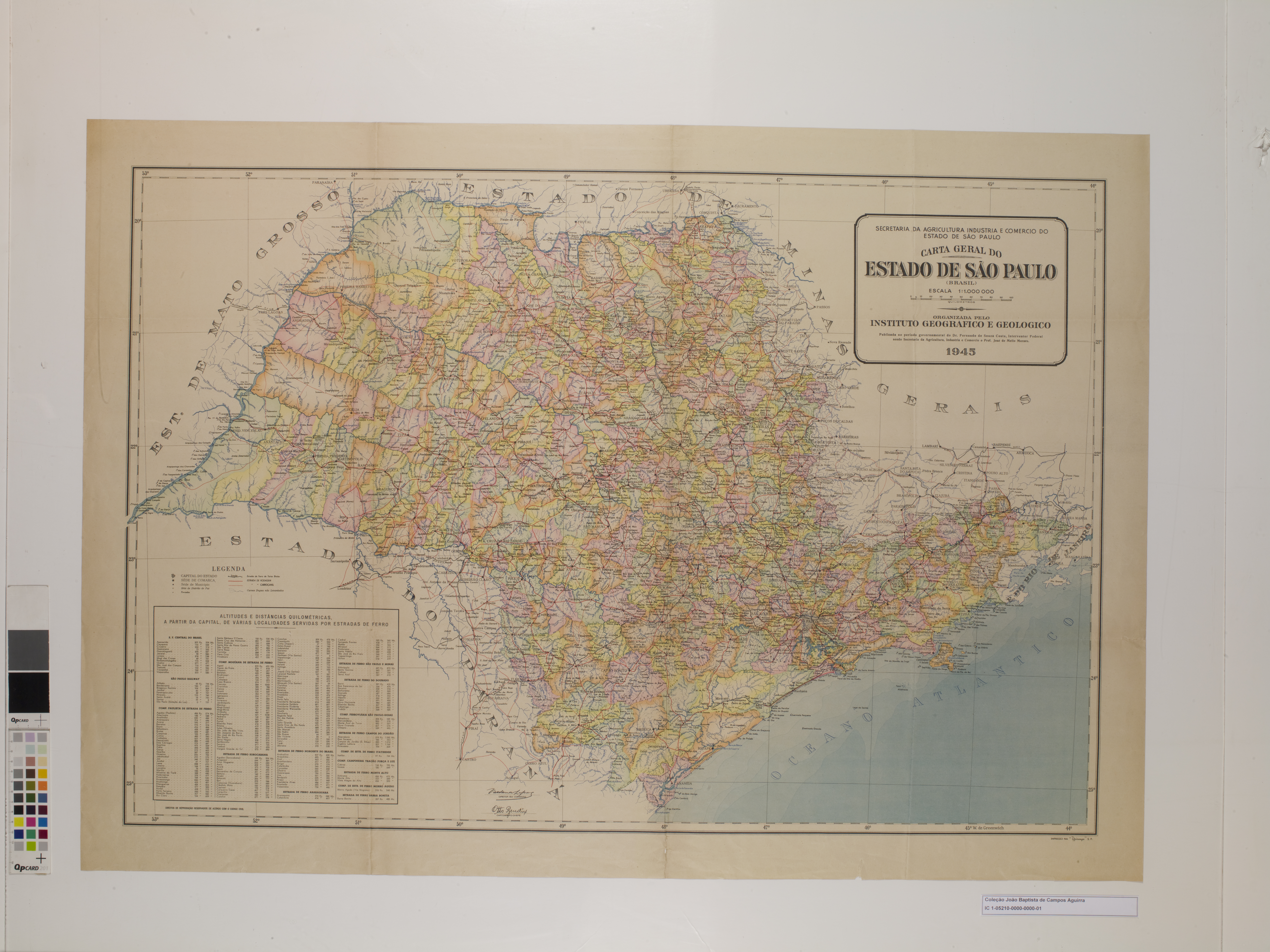
Map of the state of São Paulo (1944).

== Media ==
In telecommunications, the city was served by Telecomunicações de São Paulo. In July 1998, this company was acquired by Telefónica, which adopted the Vivo brand in 2012. The company is currently an operator of cell phones, fixed lines, internet (fiber optics/4G) and television (satellite and cable).

== Religion ==
Christianity is present in the city as follows:

=== Catholic Church ===
The Catholic church in the municipality is part of the Roman Catholic Diocese of Marília.

=== Protestant Church ===
The most diverse evangelical beliefs are present in the city, mainly Pentecostal, including the Assemblies of God in Brazil (the largest evangelical church in the country), Christian Congregation in Brazil, among others. These denominations are growing more and more throughout Brazil.

== See also ==
- List of municipalities in São Paulo
