= 2001 World Archery Championships – Women's individual recurve =

The women's individual recurve competition at the 2001 World Archery Championships took place in September 2001 in Beijing, China. 95 archers entered the competition. Following a qualifying 144 arrow FITA round, the top 64 archers qualified for the 6-round knockout tournament, drawn according to their qualification round scores. The semi-finals and finals then took place on 23 September.

== Qualifying ==
The following archers were the leading 8 qualifiers:

1. (South Korea) Choi Nam-ok (Quarterfinal)
2. (Italy) Natalia Valeeva (3rd round)
3. (South Korea) Park Sung-hyun (Champion)
4. (South Korea) Kim Kyung-wook (2nd place)
5. (South Korea) Choi Jin (Quarterfinal)
6. (China) Zhang Juanjuan (Quarterfinal)
7. (Ukraine) Kateryna Palekha (3rd place)
8. (China) He Ying (2nd round)

== Full draw ==
=== Section 1 ===
1st round
1	(South Korea) Choi Nam-ok	160
64	(Belarus) Katsiaryna Muliuk	154
33	(Germany) Jutta Schneider	155
32	(Mexico) Erika Reyes	156
17	(Chinese Taipei) Chen Hsin-i	154
48	(Australia) Eliza Matthews	156
49	(Turkey) Natalia Nasaridze	155
16	(United Kingdom) Naomi Folkard	162
9	(Poland) Barbara Wegrzynowska	161
56	(United Kingdom) Lindsay Pearson	159
41	(United Kingdom) Alison Williamson	162
24	(Belarus) Anna Karaseva	152
25	(China) Yang Jianping	160
40	(France) Agnes Bablee	159
57	(Turkey) Zekiye Keskin	154
8	(China) He Ying	162

2nd round
1	(South Korea) Choi Nam-ok	165
32	(Mexico) Erika Reyes	158
48	(Australia) Eliza Matthews	159
16	(United Kingdom) Naomi Folkard	151
9	(Poland) Barbara Wegrzynowska	154
41	(United Kingdom) Alison Williamson	158
25	(China) Yang Jianping	164
8	(China) He Ying	147

3rd round
1	(South Korea) Choi Nam-ok	169
48	(Australia) Eliza Matthews	154
41	(United Kingdom) Alison Williamson	158
25	(China) Yang Jianping	155

Quarterfinal
1	(South Korea) Choi Nam-ok	107
41	(United Kingdom) Alison Williamson	110

=== Section 2 ===
1st round
5	(South Korea) Choi Jin	164
60	(Finland) Yrjonen Taru	159
37	(Australia) Deonne Bridger	157
28	(China) Sa Ren	164
21	(Kazakhstan) Yelena Plotnikova	152
44	(Italy) Roberta Allodi	156
53	(Finland) Suutari Katri	151
12	(Ukraine) Olena Sadovnycha	155
13	(Japan) Mayumi Asano	155
52	(Turkey) Elif Altınkaynak	153
45	(Japan) Misa Tsubouchi	156
20	(Italy) Irene Franchini	156*
29	(France) Sylvie Pissis	155
36	(Germany) Wiebke Nulle	155*
61	(Belarus) Olga Moroz	153
4	(South Korea) Kim Kyung-wook	169

2nd round
5	(South Korea) Choi Jin	165
28	(China) Sa Ren	158
44	(Italy) Roberta Allodi	147
12	(Ukraine) Olena Sadovnycha	166
13	(Japan) Mayumi Asano	161
20	(Italy) Irene Franchini	159
36	(Germany) Wiebke Nulle	159
4	(South Korea) Kim Kyung-wook	162

3rd round
5	(South Korea) Choi Jin	169
12	(Ukraine) Olena Sadovnycha	161
13	(Japan) Mayumi Asano	163
4	(South Korea) Kim Kyung-wook	165

Quarterfinal
5	(South Korea) Choi Jin	106
4	(South Korea) Kim Kyung-wook	113

=== Section 3 ===
1st round
3	(South Korea) Park Sung-hyun	163
62	(Austria) Sabine Mayrhofer	151
35	(Chinese Taipei) Tsai Ching-wen	159
30	(Russia) Irina Outkina	156
19	(Germany) Cornelia Pfohl	154
46	(France) Alexandra Fouace	148
51	(India) Chekrovolu Swuro	157
14	(Germany) Barbara Mensing	161
11	(Russia) Margarita Galinovskaya	163
54	(South Africa) Kirstin Lewis	150
43	(France) Aurore Trayan	155
22	(Poland) Justyna Mospinek	154
27	(Portugal) Maria-Joao Ribeiro	158
38	(Spain) Almudena Gallardo	167
59	(Denmark) Katja Brix Poulsen	157
6	(China) Zhang Juanjuan	171

2nd round
3	(South Korea) Park Sung-hyun	167
35	(Chinese Taipei) Tsai Ching-wen	155
19	(Germany) Cornelia Pfohl	152
14	(Germany) Barbara Mensing	157
11	(Russia) Margarita Galinovskaya	157
43	(France) Aurore Trayan	159
38	(Spain) Almudena Gallardo	161
6	(China) Zhang Juanjuan	168

3rd round
3	(South Korea) Park Sung-hyun	165
14	(Germany) Barbara Mensing	154
43	(France) Aurore Trayan	161
6	(China) Zhang Juanjuan	163

Quarterfinal
3	(South Korea) Park Sung-hyun	110
6	(China) Zhang Juanjuan	97

=== Section 4 ===
1st round
7	(Ukraine) Kateryna Palekha	157
58	(Russia) Nadejda Badmatsirenova	155
39	(Chinese Taipei) Hung Shih-chun	150
26	(Sweden) Karin Larsson	159
23	(Chinese Taipei) Liu Pi-yu	151
42	(Kazakhstan) Olga Pilipova	152
55	(Poland) Małgorzata Sobieraj	140
10	(Poland) Agata Bulwa	154
15	(Ukraine) Tetyana Berezhna	162
50	(Italy) Elena Maffioli	158
47	(Russia) Anna Poutseva	149
18	(Sweden) Petra Ericsson	164
31	(Ukraine) Nataliya Burdeyna	159
34	(India) Dola Banerjee	163
63	(Finland) Suutari Kaisa	155
2	(Italy) Natalia Valeeva	161

2nd round
7	(Ukraine) Kateryna Palekha	162
26	(Sweden) Karin Larsson	159
42	(Kazakhstan) Olga Pilipova	154
10	(Poland) Agata Bulwa	153
15	(Ukraine) Tetyana Berezhna	160
18	(Sweden) Petra Ericsson	167
34	(India) Dola Banerjee	160
2	(Italy) Natalia Valeeva	161

3rd round
7	(Ukraine) Kateryna Palekha	171
42	(Kazakhstan) Olga Pilipova	153
18	(Sweden) Petra Ericsson	169
2	(Italy) Natalia Valeeva	164

Quarterfinal
7	(Ukraine) Kateryna Palekha	109
18	(Sweden) Petra Ericsson	108

== Finals ==
Quarterfinals
1	(South Korea) Choi Nam-ok	107
41	(United Kingdom) Alison Williamson	110
5	(South Korea) Choi Jin	106
4	(South Korea) Kim Kyung-wook	113
3	(South Korea) Park Sung-hyun	110
6	(China) Zhang Juanjuan	97
7	(Ukraine) Kateryna Palekha	109
18	(Sweden) Petra Ericsson	108

Semifinals
41	(United Kingdom) Alison Williamson	108
4	(South Korea) Kim Kyung-wook	111
3	(South Korea) Park Sung-hyun	114
7	(Ukraine) Kateryna Palekha	109

Finals
4	(South Korea) Kim Kyung-wook	111
3	(South Korea) Park Sung-hyun	111*
Third place
41	(United Kingdom) Alison Williamson	105
7	(Ukraine) Kateryna Palekha	107
