= Archery at the 2000 Summer Olympics – Women's individual =

Archery at the Olympics

Women's individual at the Games of the XXVII Olympiad
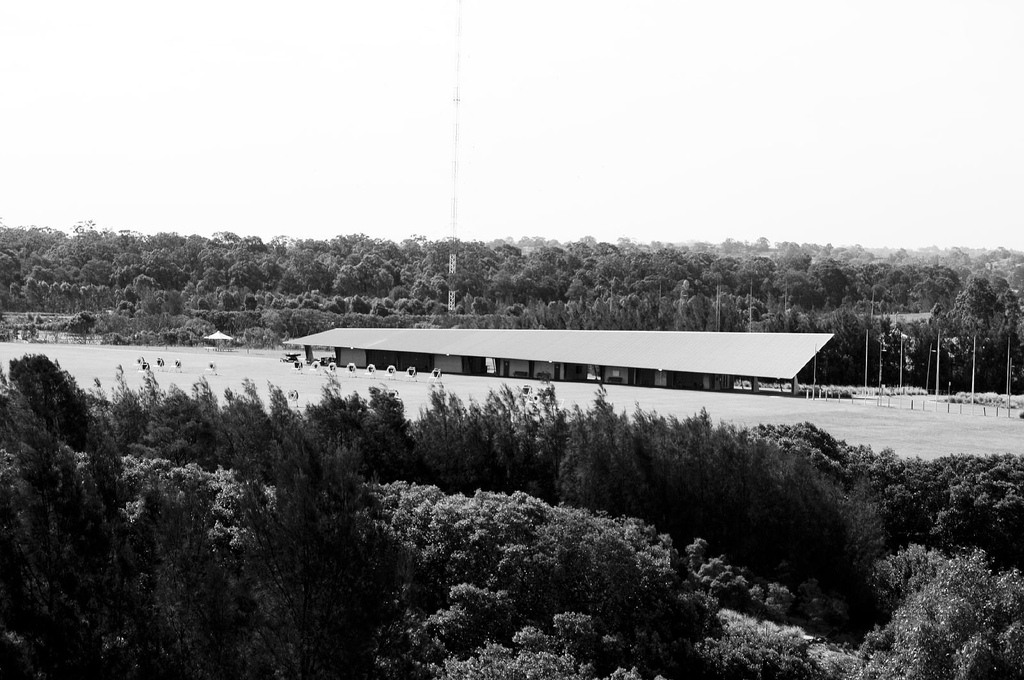
- The Sydney International Archery Park, where the event took place
- Venue: Sydney International Archery Park
- Date: 16–19 September 2000
- Competitors: 64 from 31 nations

Medalists
| 1st place, gold medalist(s) | | Yun Mi-jin | South Korea |
| 2nd place, silver medalist(s) | | Kim Nam-soon | South Korea |
| 3rd place, bronze medalist(s) | | Kim Soo-nyung | South Korea |

The women's individual archery event at the 2000 Summer Olympics was part of the archery programme. Like other archery events at the Olympics, it featured the recurve discipline. All archery was done at a range of 70 metres. 64 archers competed.

The competition format was unchanged from 1996. The competition began with a 72-arrow ranking round. This was followed by three elimination rounds, in which archers competed head-to-head in 18-arrow matches. After these rounds, there were 8 archers left. The quarterfinals, semifinals, and medal matches (collectively termed the "finals round") were 12-arrow matches. In all matches, losers were eliminated and received a final rank determined by their score in that round, with the exception of the semifinals. The losers of the semifinals competed in the bronze medal match.

== Schedule ==
| Date | Time | Round |
|---|---|---|
| Saturday, 16 September 2000 | 9:00 | Ranking Round |
| Sunday, 17 September 2000 | 9:00; 14:00 | Round of 64, Round of 32 |
| Tuesday, 19 September 2000 | 9:00 | Round of 16 |
| Tuesday, 19 September 2000 | 14:00 | Quarterfinals |
| Tuesday, 19 September 2000 | 15:08 | Semifinals |
| Wednesday, 20 September 2000 | 15:47 | Finals |

== Results ==
The initial round was held on 16 September. Each archer fired 72 arrows, with the score from this round determining their seeding into the single-elimination tournament to follow.

=== Ranking Round ===
| Rank | Archer | Nation | Score |
|---|---|---|---|
| 1 | Kim Soo-nyung | South Korea | 671 |
| 2 | Natalia Valeeva | Italy | 667 |
| 3 | Kim Nam-soon | South Korea | 662 |
| 4 | Yun Mi-jin | South Korea | 661 |
| 5 | Olena Sadovnycha | Ukraine | 658 |
| 6 | Sayoko Kawauchi | Japan | 654 |
| 7 | Choe Ok-sil | North Korea | 649 |
| 8 | Liu Pi-yu | Chinese Taipei | 647 |
| 9 | Petra Ericsson | Sweden | 646 |
| 10 | Kateryna Serdyuk | Ukraine | 644 |
| 11 | Yu Hui | China | 643 |
| 12 | Lin Yi-yin | Chinese Taipei | 640 |
| 13 | Elif Altınkaynak | Turkey | 638 |
| 14 | He Ying | China | 638 |
| 15 | Hamdiah Damanhuri | Indonesia | 637 |
| 16 | Janet Dykman | United States | 636 |
| 17 | Natalia Nasaridze | Turkey | 636 |
| 18 | Jill Borresen | South Africa | 635 |
| 19 | Cornelia Pfohl | Germany | 635 |
| 20 | Alison Williamson | Great Britain | 635 |
| 21 | Natalia Bolotova | Russia | 634 |
| 22 | Karen Scavotto | United States | 634 |
| 23 | Barbara Mensing | Germany | 634 |
| 24 | Joanna Nowicka | Poland | 633 |
| 25 | Yang Jianping | China | 633 |
| 26 | Nataliya Burdeyna | Ukraine | 632 |
| 27 | Kate Fairweather | Australia | 630 |
| 28 | Anna Łęcka | Poland | 630 |
| 29 | Anna Karasyova | Belarus | 629 |
| 30 | Wen Chia-ling | Chinese Taipei | 628 |
| 31 | Sandra Wagner-Sachse | Germany | 628 |
| 32 | Melissa Jennison | Australia | 628 |
| 33 | Khatuna Lorigi | Georgia | 627 |
| 34 | Karin Larsson | Sweden | 626 |
| 35 | Sylvie Pissis | France | 625 |
| 36 | Almudena Gallardo | Spain | 625 |
| 37 | Yelena Plotnikova | Kazakhstan | 623 |
| 38 | Khatuna Phutkaradze | Georgia | 623 |
| 39 | Zekiye Satır | Turkey | 622 |
| 40 | Mayumi Asano | Japan | 621 |
| 41 | Olga Moroz | Belarus | 620 |
| 42 | Alexandra Fouace | France | 619 |
| 43 | Denise Parker | United States | 619 |
| 44 | Evangelia Psarra | Greece | 618 |
| 45 | Kristina Nordlander | Sweden | 618 |
| 46 | Vladlena Priestman | Great Britain | 618 |
| 47 | Cristina Ioriatti | Italy | 618 |
| 48 | Kirstin Jean Lewis | South Africa | 615 |
| 49 | Michelle Tremelling | Australia | 615 |
| 50 | Tshering Chhoden | Bhutan | 614 |
| 51 | Wenche-Lin Hess | Norway | 613 |
| 52 | Jennifer Chan | Philippines | 613 |
| 53 | Asmat Diasamidze | Georgia | 612 |
| 54 | Yaremis Pérez | Cuba | 612 |
| 55 | Irene Franchini | Italy | 611 |
| 56 | Edisbel Martínez | Cuba | 611 |
| 57 | Katja Poulsen | Denmark | 609 |
| 58 | Katri Suutari | Finland | 608 |
| 59 | Denisse van Lamoen | Chile | 605 |
| 60 | Agata Bulwa | Poland | 603 |
| 61 | Erika Reyes | Mexico | 597 |
| 62 | Thi Thi Win | Myanmar | 567 |
| 63 | Henriette Youanga | Central African Republic | 490 |
| 64 | Margaret Tumusiime | Uganda | 474 |

=== Competition bracket ===
==== Section 1 ====
Round of 64
1 | Kim Soo-Nyung (KOR) | 164
64 | Margaret Tumusiime (UGA) | 124
32 | Melissa Jennison (AUS) | 160
33 | Khatuna Lorigi (GEO) | 151
17 | Natalia Nasaridze (TUR) | 153
48 | Kirstin Jean Lewis (RSA) | 154
16 | Janet Dykman (USA) | 146
49 | Michelle Tremelling (AUS) | 154
8 | Liu Pi-yu (TPE) | 161
57 | Katja Poulsen (DEN) | 152
25 | Yang Jianping (CHN) | 156
40 | Mayumi Asano (JPN) | 154
24 | Joanna Nowicka (POL) | 152
41 | Olga Moroz (BLR) | 139
9 | Petra Ericsson (SWE) | 154
56 | Edisbel Martínez (CUB) | 146

Round of 32
1 | Kim Soo-nyung (KOR) | 164
32 | Melissa Jennison (AUS) | 159
48 | Kirstin Jean Lewis (RSA) | 147
49 | Michelle Tremelling (AUS) | 162
8 | Liu Pi-yu (TPE) | 157
25 | Yang Jianping (CHN) | 160
24 | Joanna Nowicka (POL) | 162
9 | Petra Ericsson (SWE) | 152

Round of 16
1 | Kim Soo-nyung (KOR) | 168
49 | Michelle Tremelling (AUS) | 158
25 | Yang Jianping (CHN) | 158
24 | Joanna Nowicka (POL) | 162

Quarterfinals
1 | Kim Soo-nyung (KOR) | 106
24 | Joanna Nowicka (POL) | 100

==== Section 2 ====
Round of 64
5 | Olena Sadovnycha (UKR) | 163
60 | Agata Bulwa (POL) | 155
28 | Anna Łęcka (POL) | 163
37 | Yelena Plotnikova (KAZ) | 149
21 | Natalia Bolotova (RUS) | 161
44 | Evangelia Psarra (GRE) | 154
12 | Lin Yi-yin (TPE) | 158
53 | Asmat Diasamidze (GEO) | 140
4 | Yun Mi-jin (KOR) | 168
61 | Erika Reyes (MEX) | 157
29 | Anna Karaseva (BLR) | 163
36 | Almudena Gallardo (ESP) | 162
20 | Alison Williamson (GBR) | 156
45 | Kristina Nordlander (SWE) | 145
13 | Elif Altınkaynak (TUR) | 160
52 | Jennifer Chan (PHI) | 143

Round of 32
5 | Olena Sadovnycha (UKR) | 158
28 | Anna Łęcka (POL) | 159
21 | Natalia Bolotova (RUS) | 158
12 | Lin Yi-yin (TPE) | 157
4 | Yun Mi-jin (KOR) | 162
29 | Anna Karaseva (BLR) | 152
20 | Alison Williamson (GBR) | 157
13 | Elif Altınkaynak (TUR) | 154

Round of 16
28 | Anna Łęcka (POL) | 157
21 | Natalia Bolotova (RUS) | 161
4 | Yun Mi-jin (KOR) | 173
20 | Alison Williamson (GBR) | 164

Quarterfinals
21 | Natalia Bolotova (RUS) | 105
4 | Yun Mi-Jin (KOR) | 110

==== Section 3 ====
Round of 64
3 | Kim Nam-soon (KOR) | 167
62 | Thi Thi Win (MYA) | 134
30 | Wen Chia-ling (TPE) | 151
35 | Sylvie Pissis (FRA) | 149
19 | Cornelia Pfohl (GER) | 159
46 | Vladlena Priestman (GBR) | 155
14 | He Ying (CHN) | 160
51 | Wenche-Lin Hess (NOR) | 145
6 | Sayoko Kawauchi (JPN) | 151
59 | Denisse van Lamoen (CHI) | 146
27 | Kate Fairweather (AUS) | 166
38 | Khatuna Phutkaradze (GEO) | 158
22 | Karen Scavotto (USA) | 162
43 | Denise Parker (USA) | 152
11 | Yu Hui (CHN) | 155
54 | Yaremis Pérez (CUB) | 159

Round of 32
3 | Kim Nam-soon (KOR) | 162
30 | Wen Chia-ling (TPE) | 158
19 | Cornelia Pfohl (GER) | 157
14 | He Ying (CHN) | 163
6 | Sayoko Kawauchi (JPN) | 160
27 | Kate Fairweather (AUS) | 158
22 | Karen Scavotto (USA) | 158
54 | Yaremis Pérez (CUB) | 155

Round of 16
3 | Kim Nam-soon (KOR) | 165
14 | He Ying (CHN) | 162
6 | Sayoko Kawauchi (JPN) | 159
22 | Karen Scavotto (USA) | 157

Quarterfinals
3 | Kim Nam-soon (KOR) | 114
6 | Sayoko Kawauchi (JPN) | 110

==== Section 4 ====
Round of 64
7 | Choe Ok-sil (PRK) | 161
58 | Katri Suutari (FIN) | 149
26 | Nataliya Burdeyna (UKR) | 166
39 | Zekiye Satır (TUR) | 157
23 | Barbara Mensing (GER) | 157
42 | Alexandra Fouace (FRA) | 149
10 | Kateryna Serdyuk (UKR) | 157
55 | Irene Franchini (ITA) | 144
2 | Natalia Valeeva (ITA) | 166
63 | Henriette Youanga (CAF) | 126
31 | Sandra Wagner-Sachse (GER) | 146
34 | Karin Larsson (SWE) | 147
18 | Jill Borresen (RSA) | 145
47 | Cristina Ioriatti (ITA) | 154
15 | Hamdiah Damanhuri (INA) | 165
50 | Tshering Chhoden (BHU) | 153

Round of 32
7 | Choe Ok-sil (PRK) | 162
26 | Nataliya Burdeyna (UKR) | 160
23 | Barbara Mensing (GER) | 161
10 | Kateryna Serdyuk (UKR) | 153
2 | Natalia Valeeva (ITA) | 162
34 | Karin Larsson (SWE) | 160
47 | Cristina Ioriatti (ITA) | 156^{7}
15 | Hamdiah Damanhuri (INA) | 156^{6}

Round of 16
7 | Choe Ok-sil (PRK) | 160
23 | Barbara Mensing (GER) | 153
2 | Natalia Valeeva (ITA) | 163
47 | Cristina Ioriatti (ITA) | 156

Quarterfinals
7 | Choe Ok-sil (PRK) | 107
2 | Natalia Valeeva (ITA) | 103

==== Finals ====
Semifinals
Kim Soo-nyung (KOR) | 105
Yun Mi-jin (KOR) | 107
Kim Nam-soon (KOR) | 114
Choe Ok-sil (PRK) | 107

Final
Yun Mi-jin (KOR) | 107
Kim Nam-soon (KOR) | 106
Bronze medal match
Kim Soo-nyung (KOR) | 103
Choe Ok-sil (PRK) | 101

== Sources ==
- Official Report
- Wudarski, Pawel (1999). "Wyniki Igrzysk Olimpijskich" (in Polish). Archived from the original on 18 January 2008.
