= 2001 World Archery Championships – Women's team recurve =

The women's team recurve competition at the 2001 World Archery Championships took place in September 2001 in Beijing, China. 95 archers took part in the women's recurve qualification round with no more than 4 from each country, and the 16 teams of 3 archers with the highest cumulative totals (out of a possible 22) qualified for the 4-round knockout round, drawn according to their qualification round scores.

== Seeds ==
Seedings were based on the combined total of the team members' qualification scores in the individual ranking rounds. The top 16 teams were assigned places in the draw depending on their overall ranking.

1. (South Korea) Choi Nam-ok / Park Sung-hyun / Kim Kyung-wook (3rd place)
2. (China) Zhang Juanjuan / He Ying / Yang Jianping (champions)
3. (Ukraine) Kateryna Palekha / Olena Sadovnycha / Tetyana Berezhna (4th place)
4. (Italy) Natalia Valeeva / Irene Franchini / Roberta Allodi (2nd place)
5. (Poland) Barbara Wegrzynowska / Agata Bulwa / Justyna Mospinek (quarterfinal)
6. (Germany) Barbara Mensing / Cornelia Pfohl / Jutta Schneider (quarterfinal)
7. (Chinese Taipei) Chen Hsin-i / Liu Pi-yu / Tsai Ching-wen (quarterfinal)
8. (Russia) Margarita Galinovskaya / Irina Outkina / Anna Poutseva (quarterfinal)
9. (France) Sylvie Pissis / Agnes Bablee / Aurore Trayan (1st round)
10. (United Kingdom) Naomi Folkard / Alison Williamson / Lindsay Pearson (1st round)
11. (Sweden) Petra Ericsson / Karin Larsson / Mix Haxholm (1st round)
12. (Japan) Mayumi Asano / Misa Tsubouchi / Shizuki Enamoto (1st round)
13. (Kazakhstan) Yelena Plotnikova / Olga Pilipova / Ainur Abdraimova (1st round)
14. (Turkey) Natalia Nasaridze / Elif Altınkaynak / Zekiye Keskin (1st round)
15. (India) Dola Banerjee / Chekrovolu Swuro / Jhano Hansdah (1st round)
16. (Belarus) Anna Karaseva / Olga Moroz / Katsiaryna Muliuk (1st round)

== Draw ==
1st round
1	South Korea	253
16	Belarus	227
9	France	226
8	Russia	234
5	Poland	236
12	Japan	228
13	Kazakhstan	226
4	Italy	245
3	Ukraine	233
14	Turkey	224
11	Sweden	233
6	Germany	237
7	Chinese Taipei	239
10	United Kingdom	233
15	India	216
2	China	240

Quarterfinals
1	South Korea	235
8	Russia	233
5	Poland	230
4	Italy	230*
3	Ukraine	242
6	Germany	233
7	Chinese Taipei	230
2	China	245

Semifinals
1	South Korea	231
4	Italy	240
3	Ukraine	224
2	China	236

Finals
4	Italy	228
2	China	232
Third place
1	South Korea	247
3	Ukraine	224
