= Archery at the 2000 Summer Olympics – Women's team =

Archery at the Olympics

Women's team at the Games of the XXVII Olympiad
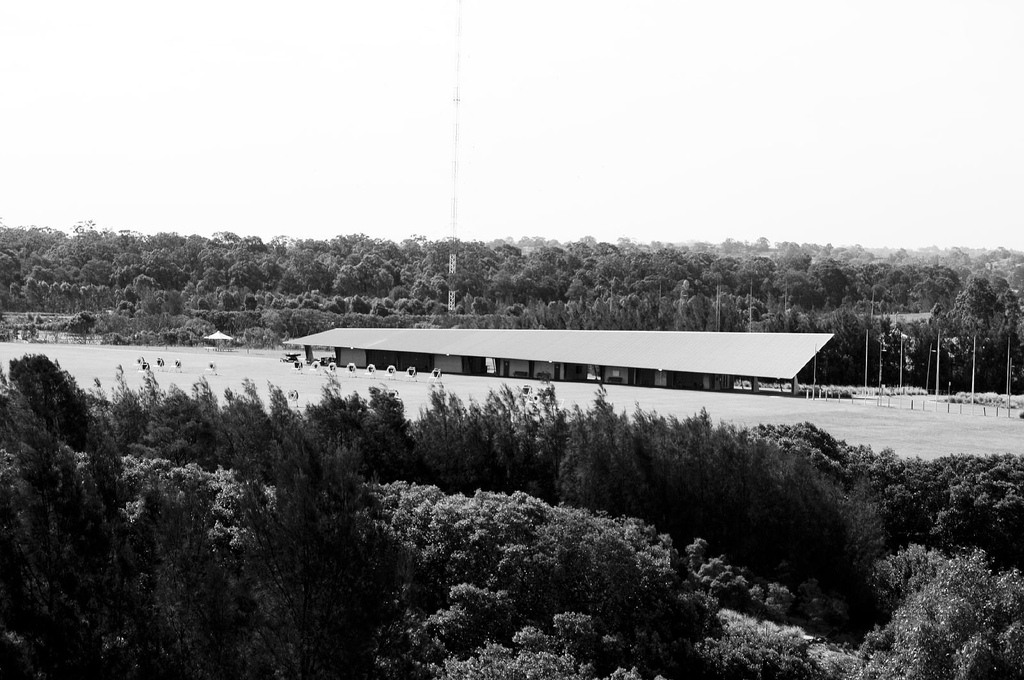
- The Sydney International Archery Park, where the event took place
- Venue: Sydney International Archery Park
- Date: 16–21 September 2000
- Competitors: 36 from 12 nations

Medalists
1st place, gold medalist(s)		Kim Nam-Soon; Kim Soo-Nyung; Yun Mi-Jin	South Korea
2nd place, silver medalist(s)		Nataliya Burdeyna; Olena Sadovnycha; Kateryna Serdyuk	Ukraine
3rd place, bronze medalist(s)		Barbara Mensing; Cornelia Pfohl; Sandra Wagner-Sachse	Germany

The women's team was an archery event held as part of the Archery at the 2000 Summer Olympics programme.

== Results ==
The ranking for the women's teams was determined by summing the ranking round scores of the three members.

Rank	Nation	Archers	Ranking round
1	South Korea	Yun Mi-Jin; Kim Nam-Soon; Kim Soo-Nyung	1994
2	Ukraine	Nataliya Burdeyna; Olena Sadovnycha; Kateryna Serdyuk	1934
3	Chinese Taipei	Lin Yi-Yin; Liu Pi-Yu; Wen Chia-Ling	1915
4	China	He Ying; Yang Jianping; Yu Hui	1914
5	Germany	Barbara Mensing; Cornelia Pfohl; Sandra Wagner-Sachse	1897
6	Turkey	Elif Altınkaynak; Natalia Nasaridze; Zekiye Satır	1896
7	Italy	Irene Franchini; Cristina Ioriatti; Natalia Valeeva	1896
8	Sweden	Petra Ericsson; Karin Larsson; Kristina Nordlander	1890
9	United States	Janet Dykman; Denise Parker; Karen Scavotto	1889
10	Australia	Kate Fairweather; Melissa Jennison; Michelle Tremelling	1873
11	Poland	Agata Bulwa; Anna Lecka; Joanna Nowicka	1866
12	Georgia	Asmat Diasamidze; Khatuna Lorigi; Khatuna Phutkaradze	1862

=== Knockout stage ===
Round of 16
9	United States	242
8	Sweden	230
5	Germany	231
12	Georgia	216
6	Turkey	227
11	Poland	217
7	Italy	237
10	Australia	236

Quarterfinals
1	South Korea	252
9	United States	240
5	Germany	240
4	China	234
3	Chinese Taipei	227
6	Turkey	234
7	Italy	230
2	Ukraine	237

Semifinals
1	South Korea	251
5	Germany	238
6	Turkey	233
2	Ukraine	240

Final
1	South Korea	251
2	Ukraine	239
Bronze medal match
5	Germany	240
6	Turkey	234
