= Chinese Taipei at the 2000 Summer Olympics =

- Chinese Taipei Olympic flag
- IOC code: TPE
- NOC: Chinese Taipei Olympic Committee
- Website: www.tpenoc.net (in Chinese and English)

in Sydney
- Competitors: 62 in 14 sports
- Flag bearer: Chiang Peng-Lung
- Medals Ranked 58th: Gold 0 Silver 1 Bronze 4 Total 5

Summer Olympics appearances (overview)
- 1956; 1960; 1964; 1968; 1972; 1976–1980; 1984; 1988; 1992; 1996; 2000; 2004; 2008; 2012; 2016; 2020; 2024; 2028

Other related appearances
- Republic of China (1924–1948)

The Republic of China competed as Chinese Taipei at the 2000 Summer Olympics (中華臺北隊) in Sydney, Australia. The change in name was due to the political status of Taiwan. In addition, they flew a flag especially designed for the games separate from the flag of the Republic of China.

== Medalists ==
Medal	Name	Sport	Event	Date
Silver	Li Feng-ying	Weightlifting	Women's 53 kg	18 September
Bronze	Kuo Yi-Hang	Weightlifting	Women's 75 kg	20 September
Bronze	Chen Jing	Table tennis	Women's singles	24 September
Bronze	Huang Chih-hsiung	Taekwondo	Men's 58 kg	27 September
Bronze	Chi Shu-Ju	Taekwondo	Women's 57 kg	27 September

== Archery ==
Athlete	Event	Ranking round		Round of 64	Round of 32	Round of 16	Quarterfinals	Semifinals	Final / BM	
Athlete	Event	Score	Seed	Opposition Score	Opposition Score	Opposition Score	Opposition Score	Opposition Score	Opposition Score	Rank
Lin Yi-yin	Women's individual	640	12	Diasamidze (GEO); W 158–140	Bolotova (RUS); L 157–158	Did not advance				
Liu Pi-yu	Women's individual	647	8	Poulsen (DEN); W 161–152	Yang (CHN); L 157–160	Did not advance				
Wen Chia-ling	Women's individual	628	30	Pissis (FRA); W 151–149	Kim (KOR); L 158–162	Did not advance				
Lin Yi-yin; Liu Pi-yu; Wen Chia-ling	Women's team	1915	3	—N/a		Bye	Turkey; L 227–234	Did not advance		

== Athletics ==
Track and road events

Athlete	Event	Heat		Quarterfinal		Semifinal		Final	
Athlete	Event	Time	Rank	Time	Rank	Time	Rank	Time	Rank
Chen Tien-wen	Men's 400 m hurdles	49.93	16 Q	—N/a		50.52	23	Did not advance	
Chen Shu-chuan	Women's 100 m	12.22	62	Did not advance					

== Badminton ==
Athlete	Event	Round of 64	Round of 32	Round of 16	Quarterfinals	Semifinals	Final / BM	
Athlete	Event	Opposition Result	Opposition Result	Opposition Result	Opposition Result	Opposition Result	Opposition Result	Rank
Fung Permadi	Men's singles	Bye	Popov (BUL); W 15–0, 15–4	Gade (DEN); L 8–15, 7–15	Did not advance			
Chan Ya-lin	Women's singles	Bye	Head (AUS); W 11–1, 11–1	Audina (NED); L 2–11, 2–11	Did not advance			
Huang Chia-chi	Women's singles	Bye	Boteva (BUL); W 11–1, 11–5	Lee (KOR); W 11–9, 11–6	Ye (CHN); L 3–11, 4–11	Did not advance		
Chen Li-chin; Tsai Hui-min	Women's doubles	—N/a	Lee / Yim (KOR); L 11–15, 15–8, 12–15	Did not advance				

== Cycling ==
=== Road ===
Athlete	Event	Time	Rank
Chen Chiung-yi	Women's road race	3:28:00	45

=== Track ===
Points race

Athlete	Event	Laps behind	Points	Rank
Fang Fen-fang	Women's points race	0	0	13

== Diving ==
Athlete	Event	Preliminary		Semifinal				Final		Total	
Athlete	Event	Points	Rank	Points	Rank	Total	Rank	Points	Rank	Points	Rank
Chen Han-hung	Men's 3 m springboard	188.46	49	Did not advance							
Chen Ting	Women's 3 m springboard	229.77	29	Did not advance							
Tsai Yi-san	Women's 3 m springboard	181.92	41	Did not advance							
Hsieh Pei-hua	Women's 10 m platform	284.91	13 Q	126.66	18	411.57	17	Did not advance			

== Gymnastics ==
=== Artistic ===
==== Men ====
Athlete	Event	Qualification								Final							
Athlete	Event	Apparatus						Total	Rank	Apparatus						Total	Rank
Athlete	Event	F	PH	R	V	PB	HB	Total	Rank	F	PH	R	V	PB	HB	Total	Rank
Lin Yung-hsi	All-around	9.225	8.387	8.150	9.287	8.650	7.975	51.674	51	Did not advance							

== Judo ==
Athlete	Event	First round	Round of 32	Round of 16	Quarterfinal	Semifinal	Repechage 1	Repechage 2	Repechage 3	Repechage 4	Final / BM	
Athlete	Event	Opposition Result	Opposition Result	Opposition Result	Opposition Result	Opposition Result	Opposition Result	Opposition Result	Opposition Result	Opposition Result	Opposition Result	Rank
Chen Chun-ching	Men's –81 kg	Bye	Kukharenka (BLR); L 0000–1000	Did not advance								
Lee Chih-feng	Men's –90 kg	—N/a	González (ESP); L 0000–0201	Did not advance								
Yen Kuo-che	Men's –100 kg	Bye	Jikurauli (GEO); L 0000–1010	Did not advance								
Shih Pei-chun	Women's –52 kg	—N/a	Ravaoarisoa (MAD); W 1011–0000	Mariani (ARG); L 0000–0001	Did not advance							
Hsu Yuan-lin	Women's –78 kg	—N/a	San Miguel (ESP); L 0010–1001	Did not advance								
Lee Hsiao-hung	Women's +78 kg	—N/a	Bozhilova (BUL); W 1000–0101	Marques (BRA); L 0001–0001	Did not advance							

== Sailing ==
Athlete	Event	Race											Points	Rank
Athlete	Event	1	2	3	4	5	6	7	8	9	10	11	Points	Rank
Ted Huang	Men's Mistral	6	7	16	~~22~~	14	~~17~~	13	6	8	14	16	100	13

== Shooting ==
Athlete	Event	Qualification		Final		Total	
Athlete	Event	Points	Rank	Points	Rank	Points	Rank
Lin Yi-chun	Women's double trap	100	5 Q	34	4	134	4

== Swimming ==
Men

Athlete	Event	Heat		Semifinal		Final	
Athlete	Event	Time	Rank	Time	Rank	Time	Rank
Hsu Kuo-tung	400 m individual medley	4:42.78	44	—N/a		Did not advance	
Huang Chih-yung	50 m freestyle	24.01	51	Did not advance			
Li Tsung-chueh	200 m breaststroke	2:19.30	30	Did not advance			
Li Yun-lun	400 m freestyle	4:03.10	41	—N/a		Did not advance	
Li Yun-lun	1500 m freestyle	16:13.05	40	—N/a		Did not advance	
Tseng Cheng-hua	100 m butterfly	56.39	52	Did not advance			
Tseng Cheng-hua	200 m butterfly	2:03.62	35	Did not advance			
Wu Nien-pin	100 m freestyle	52.72	55	Did not advance			
Wu Nien-pin	200 m freestyle	1:54.58	38	Did not advance			
Wu Nien-pin	200 m individual medley	2:08.85	44	Did not advance			
Yang Shang-hsuan	100 m breaststroke	1:04.54	40	Did not advance			

Women

Athlete	Event	Heat		Semifinal		Final	
Athlete	Event	Time	Rank	Time	Rank	Time	Rank
Chiang Tzu-ying	50 m freestyle	26.84	40	Did not advance			
Hsieh Shu-ting	100 m butterfly	1:03.52	41	Did not advance			
Hsieh Shu-tzu	200 m butterfly	2:16.23	29	Did not advance			
Kuan Chia-hsien	100 m backstroke	1:07.18	40	Did not advance			
Kuan Chia-hsien	200 m backstroke	2:24.61	33	Did not advance			
Lin Chi-chan	400 m freestyle	4:17.76	25	—N/a		Did not advance	
Lin Chi-chan	800 m freestyle	9:01.09	24	—N/a		Did not advance	
Tsai Shu-min	100 m freestyle	59.39	46	Did not advance			
Tsai Shu-min	200 m freestyle	2:06.12	32	Did not advance			

== Table tennis ==
Men

Athlete	Event	Group stage			Round of 32	Round of 16	Quarterfinals	Semifinals	Final / BM	
Athlete	Event	Opposition Result	Opposition Result	Rank	Opposition Result	Opposition Result	Opposition Result	Opposition Result	Opposition Result	Rank
Chang Yen-shu	Singles	Hamam (TUN); W 3–0	Ding (AUT); W 3–0	1 Q	Samsonov (BLR); L 0–3	Did not advance				
Chiang Peng-lung	Singles	Bye			Kreanga (GRE); W 3–0	Liu (CHN); L 0–3	Did not advance			
Chang Yen-shu; Chiang Peng-lung	Doubles	Bye			—N/a	Maze / Tugwell (DEN); W 3–0	Lee / Ryu (KOR); L 2–3	Did not advance		

Women

Athlete	Event	Group stage			Round of 32	Round of 16	Quarterfinals	Semifinals	Final / BM	
Athlete	Event	Opposition Result	Opposition Result	Rank	Opposition Result	Opposition Result	Opposition Result	Opposition Result	Opposition Result	Rank
Chen Jing	Singles	Bye			Svensson (SWE); W 3–0	Tóth (HUN); W 3–0	Gotsch (GER); W 3–2	Wang (CHN); L 1–3	Bronze medal match Jing (SGP); W 3–1	3rd place, bronze medalist(s)
Chen-Tong Fei-Ming	Singles	Kovtun (UKR); W 3–0	Ramos (VEN); W 3–0	1 Q	Schöpp (GER); W 3–2	Koyama (JPN); L 2–3	Did not advance			
Xu Jing	Singles	Molnár (HUN); W 3–0	Steshenko (TKM); W 3–0	1 Q	Konishi (JPN); L 0–3	Did not advance				
Chen Jing; Xu Jing	Doubles	Bye			—N/a	Bădescu / Steff (ROU); L 0–3	Did not advance			
Tsui Hsiu-li; Yu Feng-yun	Doubles	Oshonaike / Kaffo (NGR); W 2–0	Boroš / Aganović (CRO); L 1–2	2	Did not advance					

== Taekwondo ==
Athlete	Event	Round of 16	Quarterfinals	Semifinals	Repechage Quarterfinals	Repechage Semifinals	Final / BM	
Athlete	Event	Opposition Result	Opposition Result	Opposition Result	Opposition Result	Opposition Result	Opposition Result	Rank
Huang Chih-hsiung	Men's –58 kg	Higuchi (JPN); W 4–0	Mouroutsos (GRE); L 1–2	Did not advance	Abada (EGY); W 7–2	Salim (HUN); W 1–0	Bronze medal bout Taraburelli (ARG); W 3–0	3rd place, bronze medalist(s)
Hsu Chi-hung	Men's –68 kg	Saei (IRI); L 2–5	Did not advance					
Chi Shu-ju	Women's –49 kg	Helvacioglu (GER); W 1–0	Burns (AUS); L 3–3	Did not advance	—N/a	Güvenç (TUR); W 3–0	Bronze medal bout Poulsen (DEN); W 4–0	3rd place, bronze medalist(s)
Hsu Chih-ling	Women's –57 kg	Cameron (AUS); W 6–0	Bıkçın (TUR); L 3–6	Did not advance				

== Tennis ==
Athlete	Event	Round of 64	Round of 32	Round of 16	Quarterfinals	Semifinals	Final / BM	
Athlete	Event	Opposition Result	Opposition Result	Opposition Result	Opposition Result	Opposition Result	Opposition Result	Rank
Janet Lee; Weng Tzu-ting	Women's doubles	—N/a	Tatarkova / Zaporozhanova (UKR); L 3–6, 6^{4}–7	Did not advance				

== Weightlifting ==
Athlete	Event	Snatch		Clean & Jerk		Total	
Athlete	Event	Weight	Rank	Weight	Rank	Weight	Rank
Wang Shin-yuan	Men's –56 kg	125.0	2	160.0	4	285.0	4
Yang Chin-yi	Men's –56 kg	120.0	7	150.0	8	270.0	8
Li Feng-ying	Women's –53 kg	97.5	2	115.0	2	212.5	2nd place, silver medalist(s)
Kuo Yi-hang	Women's –75 kg	107.5	3	137.5	2	245.0	3rd place, bronze medalist(s)
