= Archery at the 2002 Asian Games – Women's individual =

Women's individual recurve at the 2002 Asian Games
- Venue: Gangseo Archery Field
- Dates: 6–8 October 2002
- Competitors: 47 from 16 nations

Medalists
gold medal	Yuan Shu-chi	Chinese Taipei
silver medal	Kim Mun-joung	South Korea
bronze medal	Yun Mi-jin	South Korea

The women's individual recurve competition at the 2002 Asian Games in Busan, South Korea was held from 6 to 8 October at the Gangseo Archery Field.

== Schedule ==
All times are Korea Standard Time (UTC+09:00)

Date	Time	Event
Sunday, 6 October 2002	09:30	Qualification 70 m
Sunday, 6 October 2002	11:00	Qualification 60 m
Monday, 7 October 2002	09:30	Qualification 50 m
Monday, 7 October 2002	11:00	Qualification 30 m
Tuesday, 8 October 2002	09:00	1/16 finals
Tuesday, 8 October 2002	10:40	1/8 finals
Tuesday, 8 October 2002	14:00	Quarterfinals
Tuesday, 8 October 2002	15:20	Semifinals
Tuesday, 8 October 2002	16:00	3rd–4th place
Tuesday, 8 October 2002	16:20	Final

== Results ==
=== Qualification ===
Rank	Seed	Athlete	Distance				Total	10s	Xs
Rank	Seed	Athlete	70m	60m	50m	30m	Total	10s	Xs
1	1	Yun Mi-jin (KOR)	332	342	328	347	1349	73	26
2	2	Kim Mun-joung (KOR)	328	340	320	352	1340	66	29
3	—	Park Hye-youn (KOR)	330	325	338	346	1339	67	24
4	—	Park Sung-hyun (KOR)	327	325	330	357	1339	64	22
5	3	Zhang Juanjuan (CHN)	319	337	320	348	1324	61	20
6	4	Yuan Shu-chi (TPE)	322	337	315	347	1321	64	10
7	5	Dola Banerjee (IND)	318	331	326	339	1314	55	17
8	6	Yu Hui (CHN)	315	324	324	343	1306	49	11
9	7	Sayami Matsushita (JPN)	316	320	324	345	1305	52	16
10	8	Choe Ok-sil (PRK)	319	331	315	340	1305	51	18
11	9	Mayumi Asano (JPN)	318	336	312	339	1305	51	18
12	10	Tsai Ching-wen (TPE)	317	332	311	344	1304	50	22
13	—	Yang Jianping (CHN)	327	326	316	334	1303	52	17
14	11	Jennifer Chan (PHI)	303	330	323	346	1302	57	21
15	—	Peng Wei-ting (TPE)	310	320	324	343	1297	50	11
16	—	Han Lu (CHN)	308	327	320	340	1295	53	20
17	12	Kim Myong-hui (PRK)	312	331	309	333	1285	46	17
18	—	Chen Hsin-i (TPE)	310	324	305	336	1275	46	8
19	13	Mon Redee Sut Txi (MAS)	307	311	317	325	1260	40	13
20	14	Chekrovolu Swuro (IND)	302	316	315	325	1258	32	7
21	15	Dorji Dema (BHU)	308	317	296	336	1257	35	11
22	16	Rachel Cabral (PHI)	300	304	311	336	1251	35	11
23	—	Yoko Yamaji (JPN)	302	315	302	331	1250	38	11
24	17	Yelena Plotnikova (KAZ)	283	305	326	334	1248	36	13
25	18	Lavanyah Raj Savindarasu (MAS)	302	316	305	321	1244	31	8
26	—	Ri Koch-sun (PRK)	308	321	297	317	1243	38	10
27	19	Dambadarjaagiin Dulamsüren (MGL)	297	299	311	333	1240	35	15
28	—	Kim Yong-ok (PRK)	297	314	295	334	1240	29	4
29	—	Fairuz Hanisah Che Ibrahim (MAS)	298	307	296	329	1230	27	7
30	20	Tshering Choden (BHU)	302	305	296	327	1230	25	5
31	21	Irina Li (KAZ)	287	296	303	326	1212	23	8
32	22	Gavhar Rajabova (TJK)	261	304	307	335	1207	39	15
33	—	Anbarasi Subramaniam (MAS)	270	305	284	338	1197	27	12
34	—	Olga Pilipova (KAZ)	294	303	268	327	1192	28	13
35	23	Gina Rahayu Sugiharti (INA)	283	293	285	331	1192	35	10
36	—	Anna Azlomets (KAZ)	278	270	311	328	1187	32	8
37	24	Ng Nga Sze (HKG)	269	298	299	320	1186	21	7
38	—	Dorji Dolma (BHU)	274	304	280	324	1182	23	8
39	—	Chisato Watanabe (JPN)	294	303	270	315	1182	34	8
40	25	Nargis Nabieva (TJK)	282	313	258	327	1180	28	7
41	—	Gulchehra Salimova (TJK)	268	281	280	327	1156	26	4
42	26	Kwok Yuk Ying (HKG)	257	303	291	293	1144	22	4
43	—	Tenzin Lhamo (BHU)	243	288	282	318	1131	25	10
44	27	Sajeevi Silva (SRI)	257	280	276	308	1121	24	7
45	28	Nada Hassan (QAT)	247	274	254	310	1085	17	5
46	—	Purita Joy Marino (PHI)	165	160	268	223	816	7	3
47	—	Joann Tabañag (PHI)	256	267			523	6	2

=== Knockout round ===
==== Finals ====
Final
4	Yuan Shu-chi (TPE)	110
2	Kim Mun-joung (KOR)	104

3rd–4th place
1	Yun Mi-jin (KOR)	110
3	Zhang Juanjuan (CHN)	108

==== Top half ====
1/16 finals
17	Yelena Plotnikova (KAZ)	153
16	Rachel Cabral (PHI)	129
9	Mayumi Asano (JPN)	152
24	Ng Nga Sze (HKG)	137
25	Nargis Nabieva (TJK)	134
8	Choe Ok-sil (PRK)	148
5	Dola Banerjee (IND)	160
28	Nada Hassan (QAT)	128
21	Irina Li (KAZ)	144
12	Kim Myong-hui (PRK)	156
13	Mon Redee Sut Txi (MAS)	150
20	Tshering Choden (BHU)	148

1/8 finals
1	Yun Mi-jin (KOR)	155
17	Yelena Plotnikova (KAZ)	145
9	Mayumi Asano (JPN)	143
8	Choe Ok-sil (PRK)	145
5	Dola Banerjee (IND)	148
12	Kim Myong-hui (PRK)	143
13	Mon Redee Sut Txi (MAS)	143
4	Yuan Shu-chi (TPE)	155

Quarterfinals
1	Yun Mi-jin (KOR)	114
8	Choe Ok-sil (PRK)	104
5	Dola Banerjee (IND)	96^{8}
4	Yuan Shu-chi (TPE)	96^{9}

Semifinals
1	Yun Mi-jin (KOR)	106
4	Yuan Shu-chi (TPE)	113

==== Bottom half ====
1/16 finals
19	Dambadarjaagiin Dulamsüren (MGL)	151
14	Chekrovolu Swuro (IND)	153
11	Jennifer Chan (PHI)	159
22	Gavhar Rajabova (TJK)	153
27	Sajeevi Silva (SRI)	134
6	Yu Hui (CHN)	163
7	Sayami Matsushita (JPN)	161
26	Kwok Yuk Ying (HKG)	118
23	Gina Rahayu Sugiharti (INA)	156
10	Tsai Ching-wen (TPE)	152
15	Dorji Dema (BHU)	146
18	Lavanyah Raj Savindarasu (MAS)	141

1/8 finals
3	Zhang Juanjuan (CHN)	158
14	Chekrovolu Swuro (IND)	133
11	Jennifer Chan (PHI)	153
6	Yu Hui (CHN)	151
7	Sayami Matsushita (JPN)	152
23	Gina Rahayu Sugiharti (INA)	138
15	Dorji Dema (BHU)	132
2	Kim Mun-joung (KOR)	159

Quarterfinals
3	Zhang Juanjuan (CHN)	108
11	Jennifer Chan (PHI)	100
7	Sayami Matsushita (JPN)	101
2	Kim Mun-joung (KOR)	109

Semifinals
3	Zhang Juanjuan (CHN)	107
2	Kim Mun-joung (KOR)	112
