= Archery at the 2002 Asian Games – Women's team =

Women's team recurve at the 2002 Asian Games
- Venue: Gangseo Archery Field
- Dates: 6–10 October 2002
- Competitors: 39 from 10 nations

Medalists
gold medal	South Korea; Kim Mun-joung, Park Hye-youn, Park Sung-hyun, Yun Mi-jin
silver medal	Chinese Taipei; Chen Hsin-i, Peng Wei-ting, Tsai Ching-wen, Yuan Shu-chi
bronze medal	China; Han Lu, Yang Jianping, Yu Hui, Zhang Juanjuan

The women's team recurve competition at the 2002 Asian Games in Busan, South Korea was held from 6 to 10 October at the Gangseo Archery Field.

== Schedule ==
All times are Korea Standard Time (UTC+09:00)

Date	Time	Event
Sunday, 6 October 2002	09:30	Qualification 70 m
Sunday, 6 October 2002	11:00	Qualification 60 m
Monday, 7 October 2002	09:30	Qualification 50 m
Monday, 7 October 2002	11:00	Qualification 30 m
Thursday, 10 October 2002	10:00	1/8 finals
Thursday, 10 October 2002	10:40	Quarterfinals
Thursday, 10 October 2002	11:00	Semifinals
Thursday, 10 October 2002	11:50	3rd–4th place
Thursday, 10 October 2002	12:15	Final

== Results ==
=== Qualification ===
Rank	Team	Distance				Total	10s	Xs
Rank	Team	70m	60m	50m	30m	Total	10s	Xs
1	South Korea (KOR)	990	1007	986	1045	4028	206	79
	Kim Mun-joung	328	340	320	352	1340	66	29
	Park Hye-youn	330	325	338	346	1339	67	24
	Park Sung-hyun	~~327~~	~~325~~	~~330~~	~~357~~	~~1339~~	~~64~~	~~22~~
	Yun Mi-jin	332	342	328	347	1349	73	26
2	China (CHN)	961	987	960	1025	3933	162	48
	Han Lu	~~308~~	~~327~~	~~320~~	~~340~~	~~1295~~	~~53~~	~~20~~
	Yang Jianping	327	326	316	334	1303	52	17
	Yu Hui	315	324	324	343	1306	49	11
	Zhang Juanjuan	319	337	320	348	1324	61	20
3	Chinese Taipei (TPE)	949	989	950	1034	3922	164	43
	Chen Hsin-i	~~310~~	~~324~~	~~305~~	~~336~~	~~1275~~	~~46~~	~~8~~
	Peng Wei-ting	310	320	324	343	1297	50	11
	Tsai Ching-wen	317	332	311	344	1304	50	22
	Yuan Shu-chi	322	337	315	347	1321	64	10
4	Japan (JPN)	936	971	938	1015	3860	141	45
	Mayumi Asano	318	336	312	339	1305	51	18
	Sayami Matsushita	316	320	324	345	1305	52	16
	Chisato Watanabe	~~294~~	~~303~~	~~270~~	~~315~~	~~1182~~	~~34~~	~~8~~
	Yoko Yamaji	302	315	302	331	1250	38	11
5	North Korea (PRK)	939	983	921	990	3833	135	45
	Choe Ok-sil	319	331	315	340	1305	51	18
	Kim Myong-hui	312	331	309	333	1285	46	17
	Kim Yong-ok	~~297~~	~~314~~	~~295~~	~~334~~	~~1240~~	~~29~~	~~4~~
	Ri Koch-sun	308	321	297	317	1243	38	10
6	Malaysia (MAS)	907	934	918	975	3734	98	28
	Anbarasi Subramaniam	~~270~~	~~305~~	~~284~~	~~338~~	~~1197~~	~~27~~	~~12~~
	Fairuz Hanisah Che Ibrahim	298	307	296	329	1230	27	7
	Lavanyah Raj Savindarasu	302	316	305	321	1244	31	8
	Mon Redee Sut Txi	307	311	317	325	1260	40	13
7	Bhutan (BHU)	884	926	872	987	3669	83	24
	Tshering Choden	302	305	296	327	1230	25	5
	Dorji Dema	308	317	296	336	1257	35	11
	Dorji Dolma	274	304	280	324	1182	23	8
	Tenzin Lhamo	~~243~~	~~288~~	~~282~~	~~318~~	~~1131~~	~~25~~	~~10~~
8	Kazakhstan (KAZ)	864	904	897	987	3652	87	34
	Anna Azlomets	~~278~~	~~270~~	~~311~~	~~328~~	~~1187~~	~~32~~	~~8~~
	Irina Li	287	296	303	326	1212	23	8
	Olga Pilipova	294	303	268	327	1192	28	13
	Yelena Plotnikova	283	305	326	334	1248	36	13
9	Tajikistan (TJK)	811	898	845	989	3543	93	26
	Nargis Nabieva	282	313	258	327	1180	28	7
	Gavhar Rajabova	261	304	307	335	1207	39	15
	Gulchehra Salimova	268	281	280	327	1156	26	4
10	Philippines (PHI)	768	794	902	905	3369	99	35
	Rachel Cabral	300	304	311	336	1251	35	11
	Jennifer Chan	303	330	323	346	1302	57	21
	Purita Joy Marino	165	160	268	223	816	7	3
	Joann Tabañag	~~256~~	~~267~~			~~523~~	~~6~~	~~2~~

=== Knockout round ===
1/8 finals
9	Tajikistan	205
8	Kazakhstan	228
7	Bhutan	200
10	Philippines	222

Quarterfinals
1	South Korea	240
8	Kazakhstan	220
5	North Korea	222
4	Japan	224
3	Chinese Taipei	229
6	Malaysia	217
10	Philippines	216
2	China	241

Semifinals
1	South Korea	234
4	Japan	216
3	Chinese Taipei	224
2	China	220

Final
1	South Korea	246
3	Chinese Taipei	226
3rd–4th place
4	Japan	222
2	China	225
