= Wen Chia-ling =

Taiwanese archer

Personal information
- Native name
- Traditional Chinese: 溫嘉玲
- Simplified Chinese: 温嘉玲
Transcriptions
Standard Mandarin
- Hanyu Pinyin: Wēn Jiālíng
- Wade–Giles: Wên Chia-ling
Yue: Cantonese
- Jyutping: Wan1 Gaa1 Ling4
- Nationality: Taiwanese
- Born: 14 January 1978 (age 48)

Sport
- Sport: Archery

Wen Chia-ling (traditional Chinese: 溫嘉玲; simplified Chinese: 温嘉玲; born 14 January 1978) is a Taiwanese archer. She competed in the women's individual and team events at the 2000 Summer Olympics. In the individual event, she reached the top 32, while in the team event, she placed eighth.

Wen began training in archery in her first year as a student at Hsinchu Kuang-Fu Senior High School in Hsinchu, Taiwan. She competed in Taiwan's national archery team qualifier in 1996 and placed in the top eight. Despite not being chosen for the 1996 Summer Olympics, she was picked to join the national team that year. By the next year, she was a student at National Taiwan Sport University where she trained in archery under the coach Chiu Ping-kun. In 1997, she competed in the 1997 Asian Archery Championships where she placed 13th and 22nd in two events. At the 1998 World University Archery Championships, she received a bronze medal in the women's recurve bow event. Wen won a bronze medal at a women's archery event at the 1999 National Games of the Republic of China and placed 10th at the 1999 Asian Archery Championships.

== Sports career ==
=== High school ===
Wen Chia-ling was born on 14 January 1978. She attended Hsinchu Kuang-Fu Senior High School in Hsinchu, Taiwan. As a first year at the school, she was introduced to archery. Everyone in her family was against her taking up the sport, particularly her father. He wanted his youngest daughter to pursue the conventional approach of excelling in academics. In her second year at the school, Wen was chosen to be on the "Youth Representative Team" in a US invitational tournament. Min Sheng Bao said that after Wen "showed great potential", her family members began to back her pursuit of archery. In 1994, she competed on behalf of her high school at the National Zhongzheng Cup Archery Championship (Chinese: 全國中正杯射箭錦標賽) held at The Affiliated Senior High School of National Chi-Nan University. Scoring 602 points, she was the leading scorer in the high school girls division on the championship's first day. She ultimately placed third in the competition with a score of 1,821 points behind Wen competed in the National Youth Cup Archery Championship (Chinese: 全國青年杯射箭錦標賽) in 1995 and placed second in the initial stage of the high school girls division with a score of 1,200 points. She ultimately placed fourth in the competition. During the Zhongzheng Cup Archery Competition (Chinese: 中正杯射箭賽) held in 1995, Wen placed second in the high school girls division.

Wen competed in the Olympic archery national team qualifier in 1996 and placed among the top eight. Although she was not selected for the 1996 Summer Olympics, Wen was chosen to join the national archery team. She competed alongside two other team members in the National Youth Cup Archery Championship (Chinese: 全國青年杯射箭錦標賽) in 1996 and won a group gold medal. After competing in the National President's Cup Archery Championship (Chinese: 全國會長杯射箭錦標賽), Wen was chosen to compete in the World Youth Cup (Chinese: 世青杯賽). She forfeited her position in the competition as it conflicted with National Taiwan Sport University's entrance examination, which she wanted to take. Wen graduated from Hsinchu Kuang-Fu Senior High School on 15 June 1996. Min Sheng Bao sports journalist Wang Li-chu praised Wen as an "exceptional female archer" in 1996. That year, she received a commendation from the Taiwan Provincial Department of Education (Chinese: 台灣省教育廳) for her "contributions to the promotion of sports".

=== University ===
By 1997, Wen had become a student at National Taiwan Sport University. At the university, she was coached by the archer Chiu Ping-kun. At the Governor's Cup Archery Competition (Chinese: 省長杯射箭賽) held in October 1997 at Taoyuan Municipal Yang Ming Senior High School, Wen placed first in one of the individual categories. The Chinese Taipei Archery Association chose her to compete in the 1997 Asian Archery Championships held in Malaysia after she placed first in the qualifiers by scoring 90 points. She scored 589 points in an event which ranked her in 22nd place. In another event, she ranked 13th. At the National College Cup Indoor Archery Championship (Chinese: 全國大專杯室內射箭賽) held in 1998 at National Taiwan Sport University, Wen placed third. She competed in the 1998 World University Archery Championships and secured a bronze medal in the women's recurve bow event. She had won matches against British, France, and Ukrainian competitors but in the semifinals was deeated by a South Korean competitor.

Wen planned to compete in a district competition held at Chang Jung Christian University in 1998. But she had to withdraw after a car accident while she was commuting from Taipei to the university caused her to sustain a minor injury to her hands and feet. At the National Zhongzheng Cup Archery Championship (Chinese: 全國中正杯射箭錦標賽) in Tainan later that year, she placed second by scoring 2,530 points. She received a gold medal at the President's Cup Archery Competition (Chinese: 會長杯射箭賽) by scoring 96–94 against her competitor, Liu Pi-yu, in the recurse bow gold medal match held in Linkou in 1999. Wen competed in the Taiwanese qualifier for the 1999 World Archery Championships two days after her father died on 2 June 1999. She qualified for the competition after placing second. Although she had not planned to continue in the competition after her father's death, her coach, Chiu Ping-kun, encouraged her to stay in the competition. To shield her from scrutiny, they did not disclose her father's death until after she had finished competing. Wen's second-place finish was her personal best and marked her debut selection for the national team through an official cup contest.

At the 1999 World Archery Championships, Wen was defeated by Lin I-ying in the recurve bow competition by a score of 150 to 140 which qualified Lin for the 2000 Summer Olympics. Later in the year, Wen competed in the 1999 Asian Archery Championships, where she placed 10th. At the National Zhongzheng Cup Archery Championship (Chinese: 全國中正杯射箭錦標賽) in 1999, she placed fifth in the women's competition. That year, Wen participated in the National Games of the Republic of China and received a bronze medal after defeating Liu Pi-yu by 105–93. At the Youth Cup Shooting Championship (Chinese: 青年杯射箭賽的團體賽), she received gold medal in a group competition. In May 2000, Chinese Taipei Archery Association chose Wen to participate in the training camp for the 2000 Summer Olympics. She had placed second in the Sydney Olympic Archery Representative Trials (Chinese: 雪梨奧運射箭代表決選賽) held at the National Sports Training Center. In July 2000, she was chosen to compete in the Olympics after scoring 1,894 points. At the Asian Archery Tour (Chinese: 亞洲射箭巡迴賽), she received a silver medal in the women's team event.

As Wen was on the verge of competing at the 2000 Summer Olympics, United Daily News sports journalist Lei Kwang-han called her "a newcomer with no fear who has great room for improvement". The Olympics was Wen's first international competition. At the individual event in the Olympics, she competed with team members Lin Yi-yin and Liu Pi-yu. All three reached the top 32 but were eliminated before they could reach the top 16. In her last match in the individual competition, she was defeated 162–158 by South Korean competitor Kim Nam-soon. Wen also competed in the team event in the Olympics with Lin and Liu. They placed eighth in the competition after losing in the semifinals 234–227 to the Turkish team. Their ranking was the highest a Taiwanese team had received. At its 13th anniversary ceremony in November 2000, National Taiwan Sport University gave her a "Sports Excellence Award". At the National Youth Cup Archery Competition (Chinese: 全國青年杯射箭賽) that took place at the Fongshan Stadium in 2001, Wen received a gold medal in the recurve bow event.

== Personal life ==
When she was in college, her hobbies included swimming and playing video games. Wen is married to Lin Chung-chieh (Chinese: 林中傑), who is Amis and had competed in track and field at the FISU World University Games. With him, she has two sons, Lin I-kai (Chinese: 林翊凱) and Lin I-hsiang (Chinese: 林翊翔) who compete in hurdle events.
