= Archery at the 2002 Asian Games =

- Venue: Gangseo Archery Field
- Dates: 6–10 October 2002
- Competitors: 101 from 19 nations

Archery was contested from October 6 to October 10 at the 2002 Asian Games at the Gangseo Archery Field, in Busan, South Korea.

The competition included only recurve events. South Korea won both team gold medals. Hiroshi Yamamoto of Japan won the men's individual title while Yuan Shu-chi from Chinese Taipei won the women's gold medal.

== Schedule ==
R	Ranking round	F	Elimination rounds & Finals

Event↓/Date →	6th Sun	7th Mon	8th Tue	9th Wed	10th Thu
Men's individual	R	R		F	
Men's team	R	R			F
Women's individual	R	R	F		
Women's team	R	R			F

== Medalists ==
Event	Gold	Silver	Bronze
Men's individual	Hiroshi Yamamoto; Japan	Yuji Hamano; Japan	Im Dong-hyun; South Korea
Men's team	South Korea; Han Seung-hoon; Im Dong-hyun; Kim Kyung-ho; Kim Sek-keoan	Chinese Taipei; Chen Szu-yuan; Liao Chien-nan; Liu Ming-huang; Wang Cheng-pang	Kazakhstan; Alexandr Li; Vitaliy Shin; Maxim Yelisseyev; Stanislav Zabrodskiy
Women's individual	Yuan Shu-chi; Chinese Taipei	Kim Mun-joung; South Korea	Yun Mi-jin; South Korea
Women's team	South Korea; Kim Mun-joung; Park Hye-youn; Park Sung-hyun; Yun Mi-jin	Chinese Taipei; Chen Hsin-i; Peng Wei-ting; Tsai Ching-wen; Yuan Shu-chi	China; Han Lu; Yang Jianping; Yu Hui; Zhang Juanjuan

== Medal table ==
Rank	Nation	Gold	Silver	Bronze	Total
1	South Korea (KOR)	2	1	2	5
2	Chinese Taipei (TPE)	1	2	0	3
3	Japan (JPN)	1	1	0	2
4	China (CHN)	0	0	1	1
4	Kazakhstan (KAZ)	0	0	1	1
Totals (5 entries)		4	4	4	12

== Participating nations ==
A total of 101 athletes from 19 nations competed in archery at the 2002 Asian Games:

- Bhutan (8)
- China (8)
- Chinese Taipei (8)
- Hong Kong (2)
- India (6)
- Indonesia (2)
- Iran (1)
- Japan (8)
- Kazakhstan (8)
- Malaysia (4)
- Mongolia (5)
- Myanmar (4)
- North Korea (4)
- Philippines (8)
- Qatar (5)
- South Korea (8)
- Sri Lanka (5)
- Tajikistan (4)
- Uzbekistan (3)
