= Michelle Tremelling =

Australian archer (born 1969)

Personal information
- Born: 7 June 1969 (age 57) Melbourne, Australia
- Height: 165 cm (5 ft 5 in)
- Weight: 89 kg (196 lb)

Sport
- Country: Australia
- Sport: Archery
- Club: Waverley Archery Club

Michelle Tremelling (born 7 June 1969 in Melbourne, Victoria), known as Shelley, is an Australian athlete who competes in archery.

Tremelling competed at three Archery World Championships – in Jakarta in 1995, in Victoria, Canada in 1997 and, in the lead-up to the 2000 Olympics, at the 1999 World Archery Championships in Riom, France.

Tremelling represented Australia at the Sydney 2000 Olympics in both the individual and team archery events. In the individual event she was the only Australian to progress to the third round, finishing in 11th. Melissa Jennison, Kate Fairweather and Tremelling came ninth in the team event.
