= Kateryna Serdyuk =

Kateryna Serdyuk may refer to:

- Kateryna Serdyuk (archer) (born 1983), Ukrainian archer
- Kateryna Serdyuk (skier) (born 1989), Ukrainian cross-country skier
