= Margaret Tumusiime =

Ugandan archer (born 1962)

Personal information
- Born: June 20, 1962 (age 64) Uganda
- Occupation: Archer

Sport
- Country: Uganda
- Sport: Archery
- Event: Women's individual

Margaret Tumusiime (born 20 June 1962) is an archer from Uganda. She represented Uganda in archery at the 2000 Summer Olympics in Sydney, Australia.

== Career ==
Tumusiime started playing archery in 1994 with a Canadian friend. Her sister, Gertrude Mwera, and another friend quit playing after a year.

Tumusiime qualified for the 1995 All-Africa Games.

She finished seventh at the All-African Championships in 1999. This meant she qualified for the 2000 Summer Olympics and so became the first black female archer to compete in an Olympic Games.

At the Olympics, Tumusiime scored 474 points in the ranking round and finished 64th out of 64. In the round of 64 she lost 164–124 to top seed Kim Soo-nyung.

In 2004, she qualified as a level 3 coach.

In 2008, she finished ninth in the continental qualifying event for the Olympics and failed to qualify.

== See also ==
- Uganda at the 2000 Summer Olympics
- Archery at the 2000 Summer Olympics
- African Archery Championships
