= Venues of the 2000 Summer Olympics =

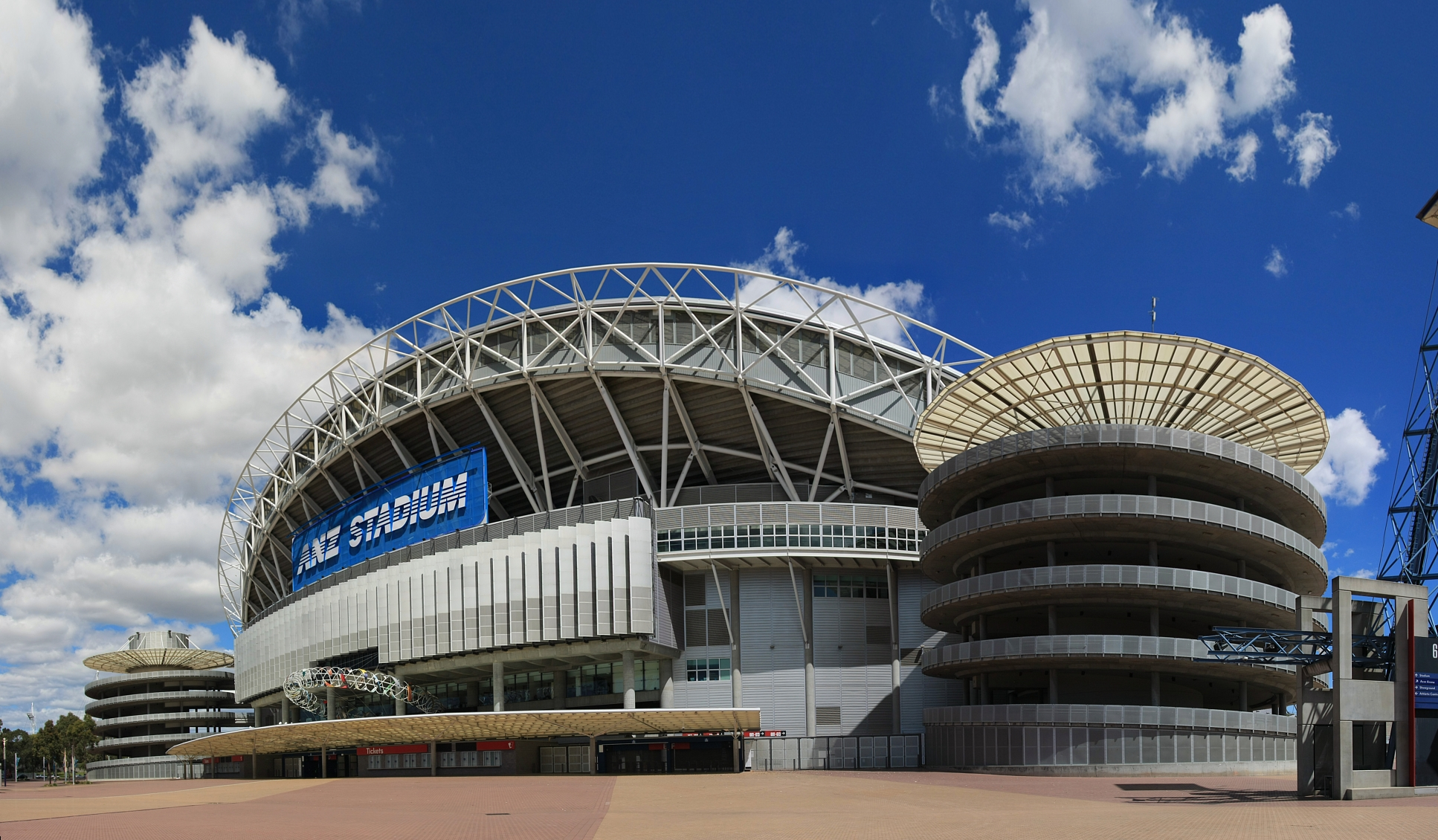
Stadium Australia (pictured in 2009) hosted both the opening and closing ceremonies, athletics and the football final for the 2000 Summer Olympics

For the 2000 Summer Olympics, a total of thirty sports venues were used. After Melbourne hosted the 1956 Summer Olympics, Australia made several bids for the Summer Olympics before finally winning the 2000 Summer Olympics by two votes over Beijing, China. Venue construction was set at the Homebush Bay area of Sydney in an effort to rehabilitate the land. Environmental studies of the area in the early 1990s forced remediation to be used for about a fifth of the site selected. Fifteen new venues were constructed for the Games. Many of the venues used for the 2000 Games continue to be in use as of 2020, although some of the pre-existing facilities have been demolished and replaced.

== Venues ==
=== Sydney Olympic Park ===
Venue	Sports	Capacity	Ref.
Sydney Olympic Park Tennis Centre	Tennis	Main Court - 10,000 Court 2 - 4,000 Court 3 - 2,000 Courts 4-10 - 7x 200	
Stadium Australia	Ceremonies (opening/closing); Athletics; Football/Soccer (final)	115,600	
Sydney Olympic Park Hockey Centre	Field hockey	15,000	
State Sports Centre	Table tennis Taekwondo	5,000	
Sydney Baseball Stadium	Baseball (final); Modern pentathlon (riding, running)	14,000	
Sydney International Archery Park	Archery	17,500	
Sydney International Aquatic Centre	Diving; Modern pentathlon (swimming); Swimming; Synchronized swimming Water polo (men's final)	10,000	
Sydney SuperDome	Basketball (final); Gymnastics (artistic/ trampoline)	18,200	
The Dome & Exhibition Complex	Badminton; Basketball; Gymnastics (rhythmic); Handball; Modern pentathlon (fencing, shooting); Volleyball (indoor)	10,000	

=== Sydney ===
Venue	Sports	Capacity	Ref.
Blacktown Olympic Park	Baseball; Softball	8,000 (softball) 4,000 (baseball)	
Bondi Beach	Volleyball (beach)	10,000	
Centennial Parklands	Cycling (road)	Not listed.	
Dunc Gray Velodrome	Cycling (track)	6,000	
Marathon course	Athletics (marathon)	Not listed.	
North Sydney	Athletics (marathon start)	Not listed.	
Cruising Yacht Club of Australia	Sailing	10,000	
Penrith Whitewater Stadium	Canoeing (slalom)	12,500	
Ryde Aquatic Leisure Centre	Water polo	3,900	
Sydney Convention & Exhibition Centre	Boxing; Fencing; Judo; Weightlifting; Wrestling	7,500 (weightlifting), 9,000 (judo & wrestling), 10,000 (boxing & fencing)	
Sydney Entertainment Centre	Volleyball	11,000	
Sydney Football Stadium	Football/Soccer (women's final)	42,500	
Sydney International Equestrian Centre	Equestrian	50,000	
Sydney International Regatta Centre	Canoeing (sprint); Rowing	20,000	
Sydney International Shooting Centre	Shooting	7,000	
Sydney Opera House	Triathlon	Not listed.	
Western Sydney Parklands	Cycling (mountain biking)	20,000	

=== Outside Sydney ===
Venue	Location	Sports	Capacity	Ref.
The Gabba	Brisbane	Football/Soccer	37,000	
Bruce Stadium	Canberra	Football/Soccer	25,011	
Hindmarsh Stadium	Adelaide	Football/Soccer	20,000	
Melbourne Cricket Ground	Melbourne	Football/Soccer	98,000	

== Before the Olympics ==
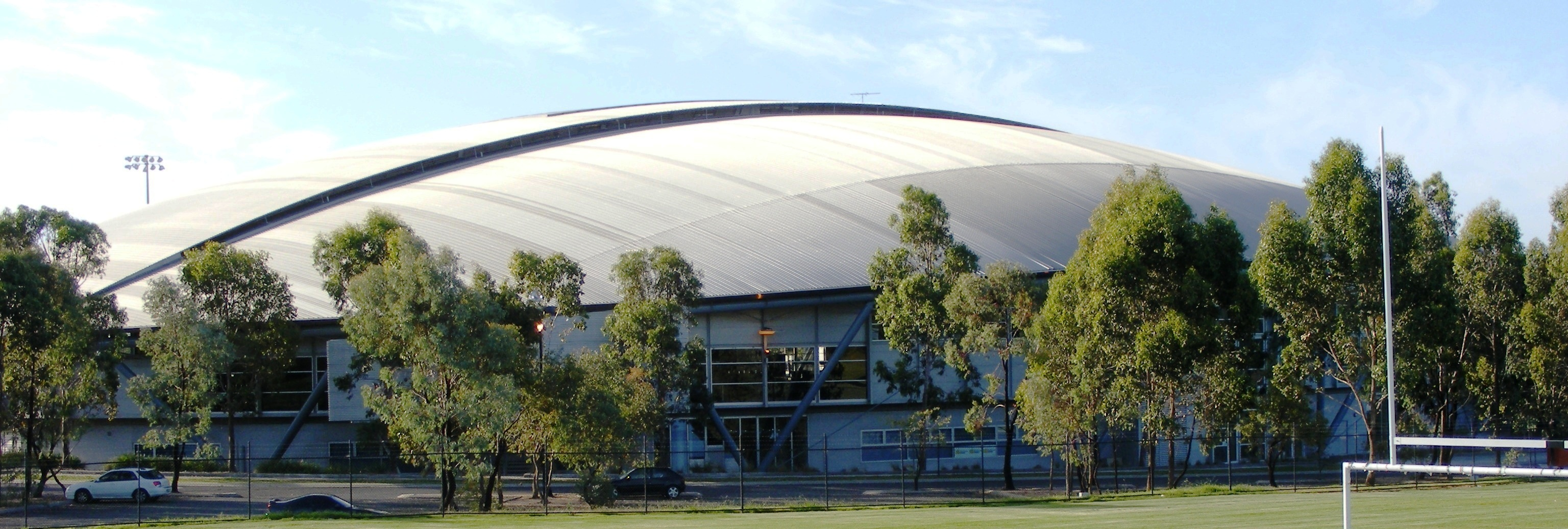
The Dunc Gray Velodrome (pictured in 2008) hosted the track cycling events for the 2000 Summer Olympics

Australia first hosted the Summer Olympics in 1956 at Melbourne. The main venue used was the Melbourne Cricket Ground which hosted the ceremonies (opening/closing), athletic events, and the finals for both field hockey and football.

Sydney first made preliminary plans for the 1972 and 1988 Summer Olympics, but they were not followed through. Melbourne ended the final process and made a bid for the 1988 Summer Games, but withdrew in February 1981. Brisbane made a bid for the 1992 Summer Olympics, losing out to Barcelona, while Melbourne finished fourth in the bidding for the 1996 Summer Olympics won by Atlanta. The first serious review for Sydney as an Olympic city took place in 1973 on rehabilitating the Homebush Bay area as an Olympic site, though those plans were not taken seriously until seven years later, when Sydney was making a preliminary bid for the 1988 Summer Games. Nick Greiner, who served as Premier of New South Wales from 1988 to 1992, led the effort to use the Olympics as a catalyst for rehabilitating Homebush Bay, forming a review committee on this in 1989. The Australian Olympic Committee endorsed this idea provisionally in December 1990 and officially three months later.

In the bid package submitted to the International Olympic Committee for Sydney, all of the venues would be located within 30 minutes of the Homebush Bay Area, where the Sydney Olympic Park would be constructed. Sydney was selected 45–43 over Beijing in the fourth round of exhaustive voting to host the 2000 Games at the IOC Meeting in Monte Carlo on 23 September 1993.

For site selection, 760 ha (1,900 acres) of Homebush Bay was selected for use though the area was not planned upon completion until 2010's. Sydney's selection to host the 2000 Summer Olympics changed this. The State Sports Centre opened in 1984, and Bicentennial Park opened four years later. The Sydney International Aquatic Centre and Sydney International Athletic Centre were completed in 1994, but by 1995, it was determined by the Sydney Olympic Organising Committee and the International Olympic Committee that venue works needed to be accelerated. In 1995, Bob Carr was elected as New South Wales Premier, with one of his first tasks to develop a masterplan for venue construction. A plan was approved in February 1996, along with lessons learned from 1996 Summer Olympics, leading to modification of the plan in February 1997. Environmental consideration was taken during site selection and construction, including the planting of 16,000 trees around completed venues once construction was completed. Soil and water testing at Homebush Bay in the early 1990s determined that 9,000,000 m^{3} (320,000,000 cu ft) of domestic, commercial and industrial waste was located on 160 ha (400 acres) of the land, resulting in remediation. Other items involved at the venues were the removal of electrical transmission lines, the development of rail lines near the venues, the construction of a new ferry wharf, and construction of vehicular parking sites.

Fifteen new venues were under construction by 1995, with all of them being completed in 1999. Temporary venues were added for beach volleyball in Bondi Beach and women's water polo pool in 2000, months prior to the Olympics. 40,000 people were involved in venue construction for the Games.

The Stadium Australia was constructed on the site of a cattle stockyard before they were sent to the slaughterhouse. Construction was delayed twice before commencing in earnest in September 1996. The stadium was completed in March 1999, and officially opened to the public three months later. The new Sydney Showground was built to replace the old Sydney Showground at Moore Park. The old Sydney Showground was first used in 1882 as part of the Sydney Royal Easter Show, but was starting to show its age by the 1970s. Construction of the new Showground at Homebush Bay began in October 1997, and was completed for the 1998 Royal Easter Show. The NSW Tennis Centre was constructed on a former home of the Australian Jockey Club from 1841 to 1869. The Sydney International Regatta Centre was constructed near a quarry in Penrith, a suburb of Sydney. It opened in July 1995, with competition starting eight months later. Penrith Whitewater Stadium was constructed following pleas to the IOC from the International Canoe Federation and French President Jacques Chirac after the sport was nearly excluded from the games. Pumps totalling 14,000 L (3,700 US gal) per second delivered the amount of whitewater needed for the slalom canoeing events at Penrith. Holsworthy Barracks was the original site for the Sydney International Shooting Centre, but that was changed due to the site not being available. This resulted in the organisers renovating an existing shooting range to meet International Shooting Sport Federation standards, a renovation that took eighteen months to complete. Bondi Beach was constructed as a temporary venue between March and November 2000, and took up less than twenty percent of the beach area used.

Test events at the venues ran from September 1998 to August 2000.

== During the Olympics ==
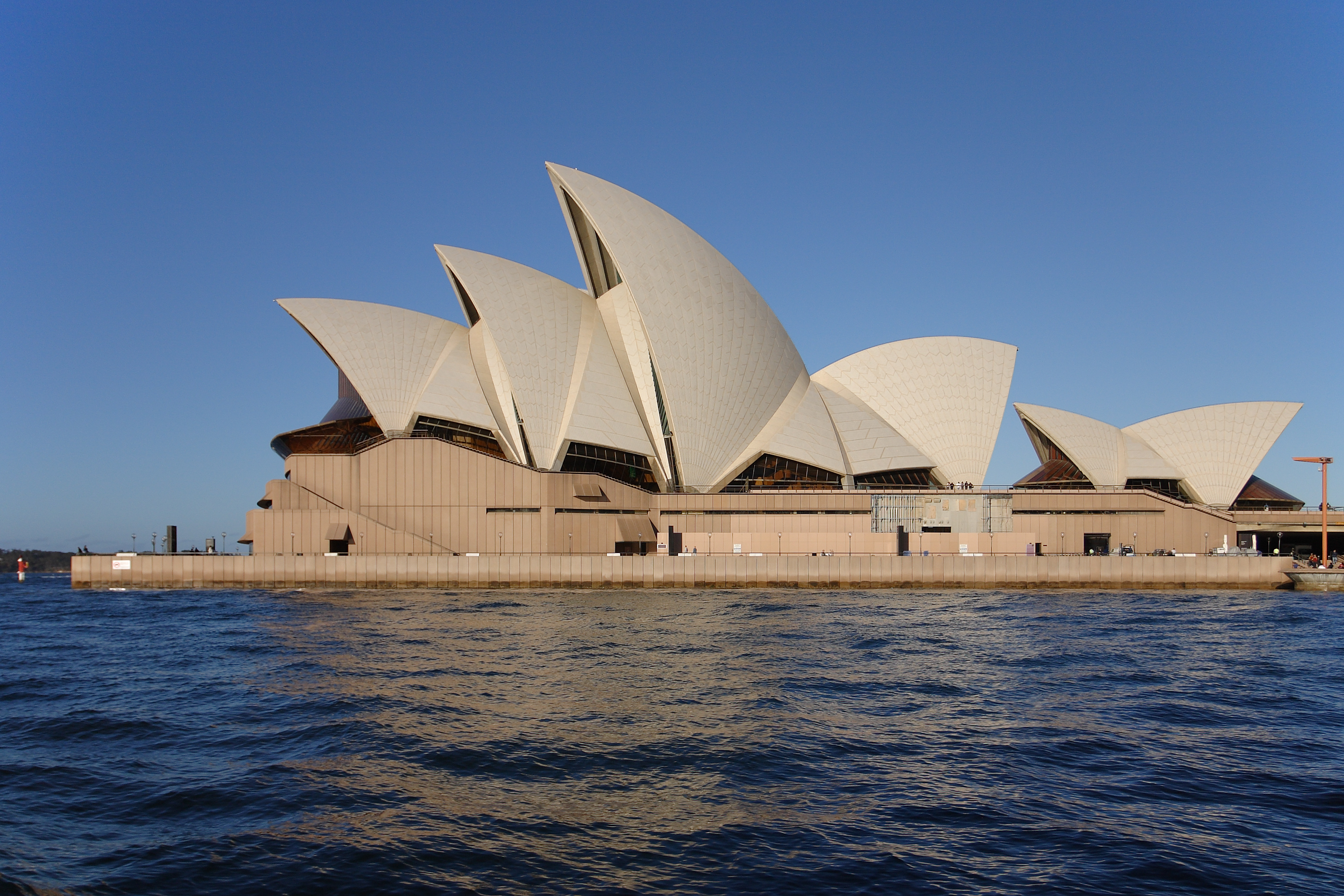
The Sydney Opera House (pictured in 2005) hosted the triathlon events for the 2000 Summer Olympics

Before the start of the women's marathon, street personnel in Sydney had to tow 137 cars that were parked along the course. Japan's Naoko Takahashi won the event.

On the last day of the canoeing speed competitions, the last races had to be delayed for a day, due to 50 mph (80 km/h) wind gusts. The Regatta Center also had lane markers that were damaged and an official's aluminum dinghy sunk. Eight days earlier in the men's rowing coxless four final, Great Britain's Steve Redgrave won the gold medal in his fifth straight Olympics.

Considered the most difficult route ever in the history of the Olympic Games, the equestrian endurance course event was marked by two serious accidents that led to the hospitalization of two riders, and four horses being injured, including one that was subsequently put to sleep. Meanwhile, the individual jumping finals were held in the midst of high winds that forced volunteers to hold down some of the top rails until a rider approached.

== After the Olympics ==
The Olympic Stadium, now Stadium Australia, continues to be used as of 2026, various capacities that may vary according to the demand of the event. The stadium was reconfigured two times after the games, making it suitable for rectangular pitch and oval ground sports with the removal of the athletics track and the use of retractable seating. The stadium was the main venue of the 2023 FIFA Women's World Cup when hosted five games along the final and is expected to host some football games at the 2032 Summer Olympics when the games will be held in Brisbane. Along with soccer, the stadium is used for regular season National Rugby League (NRL) games and the NRL Grand Final. It also hosts State of Origin home games for the NSW Blues and rugby union test matches involving the Wallabies. In a deal that ran from 2009 until 2015, the stadium was also host to all home finals for the NSW Waratahs in the Super Rugby competition (the Waratahs normally play at the Sydney Football Stadium). It was also used for the Big Bash League Twenty20 cricket games, as well as some games for the Sydney Swans and Greater Western Sydney Giants of the Australian Football League (AFL) until 2015. Stadium Australia also plays host to various concerts.

The Super Dome, now known as Qudos Bank Arena, continues to play host to numerous concerts, award nights and sporting events as of 2017. It currently hosts Sydney Kings National Basketball League games, having previously done so from 1999 to 2002. It is also the alternate home of the New South Wales Swifts, who play in the Super Netball competition, as well as hosting international netball games involving the Australia Netball Diamonds. The venue hosted the 2015 Netball World Cup, with the final attracting a world netball record attendance of 16,752. In 2001, the arena played host to the Tennis Masters Cup. The arena also plays host to world championship boxing and mixed martial arts (used as a venue by the UFC), and is the Sydney venue used on tours of Australia by World Wrestling Entertainment (WWE).

Blacktown Olympic Park plays host to competitions for cricket, Australian Rules football, soccer, softball, and baseball. Australian Baseball League team the Sydney Blue Sox play their home games at the Blacktown Baseball Stadium located at the complex.

Penrith Whitewater Stadium hosted the ICF Canoe Slalom World Championships in 2005.

The Sydney Entertainment Centre, which opened in 1983, continued to be in use until it was closed in December 2015, hosting numerous concerts, sporting events and conventions. It was the home arena for the Sydney Kings, and occasionally played host to both national senior basketball teams, the Boomers (men) and the Opals (women). The venue hosted the 1991 World Netball Championships and the 1994 FIBA Women's World Basketball Championship. The Entertainment Centre was demolished in 2016.

The Sydney Convention and Exhibition Centre remained in use until it closed in December 2013, and was demolished in 2014 to make way for the new Sydney International Convention, Exhibition and Entertainment Precinct at Darling Harbour, which was due for completion by the end of 2016.

Sydney Football Stadium, an existing stadium that opened in 1988, continues to be in use as of 2017 by the NRL (including finals), A-League (including finals), and Super Rugby. The SFS also hosts various concerts, as well as other sporting events such as boxing and Rugby sevens. In 2012, it was increased in capacity from 42,000 to 45,500, and after a 2016 proposal to demolish the stadium and replace it with a 55,000 seat venue was defeated in parliament, plans were announced to refurbish the almost 30-year-old stadium.

The Homebush Street Circuit for the V8 Supercars was used at the Olympic precinct from 2009 to 2016. The circuit was designed by former multiple Australian Touring Car, CAMS Gold Star and Bathurst 1000 winner Mark Skaife. In 2015, V8 Supercars proposed to shorten the circuit to reduce the event's costs. This proposal failed, and in March 2016, it was announced that the ongoing costs of running the event would result in 2016 being the final running of the Sydney 500.

For the venues located outside of Sydney as of 2017, the Brisbane Cricket Ground, more commonly known as the Gabba, continues to play host to international and domestic cricket, and is also the home ground of the AFL's Brisbane Lions.Bruce Stadium, now known as Canberra Stadium, is the home venue of the NRL's Canberra Raiders and Super Rugby's Brumbies, and hosts occasional international rugby league, rugby union and soccer games. Hindmarsh Stadium (now Coopers Stadium) in Adelaide is the main home venue of the A-League's Adelaide United FC. Temporary seating used during the Olympics was removed after the games, and the stadium's capacity is now 17,000. The Melbourne Cricket Ground (MCG) underwent extensive renovations before hosting the 2006 Commonwealth Games. Now with a capacity of 100,024, it remains the home of the AFL, as well as international and domestic cricket in Melbourne.
