= Archery at the 1999 Pan American Games =

- Venue: Assiniboine Park
- Start date: August 4, 1999
- End date: August 8, 1999

Archery at the 1999 Pan American Games was held from August 4 to 8, 1999. The events took place at a temporary site at Assiniboine Park in Winnipeg, Manitoba, Canada. Just like in the Olympics, the archery competition will be held using the recurve bow.

== Medal summary ==
=== Medal table ===
* Host nation (Canada)

Rank	Nation	Gold	Silver	Bronze	Total
1	United States	3	1	2	6
2	Cuba	1	1	1	3
3	Canada*	0	1	0	1
3	Chile	0	1	0	1
5	Mexico	0	0	1	1
Totals (5 entries)		4	4	4	12

=== Events ===
Event	Gold	Silver	Bronze
Men's individual	Jason McKittrick; United States	Victor Wunderle; United States	Butch Johnson; United States
Women's individual	Yaremis Pérez; Cuba	Denisse van Lamoen; Chile	Denise Parker; United States
Men's team	United States; Jason McKittrick; Victor Wunderle; Butch Johnson	Canada; Shawn Riggs; David Dalziel; Robert Rusnov	Cuba; Juan Carlos Stevens; Ismely Arias; Yasell Allue Ochoa
Women's team	United States; Denise Parker; Janet Dykman; Katie Loesch	Cuba; Yaremis Pérez; Milena Ferro; Adis Zamora	Mexico; Belle Amador; Marisal Breton; Erika Reyes

== See also ==
- Archery at the 2000 Summer Olympics
