= Karin Larsson (disambiguation) =

Karin Larsson (1859–1928) was a Swedish artist and designer.

Karin Larsson may also refer to:

- Karin Larsson (archer) (born 1976)
- Karin Larsson (swimmer) (1941–2019)
