= Yang Jianping =

Yang Jianping may refer to:

- Yang Jianping (archer)
- Yang Jianping (politician)
