= Yaremis Pérez =

Cuban archer (born 1981)

Personal information
- Nationality: Cuban
- Born: 24 March 1981 (age 45)

Sport
- Sport: Archery
Medal record
Representing Cuba
Pan American Games
Gold medal – first place	1999 Winnipeg	Individual
Silver medal – second place	1999 Winnipeg	Team

Yaremis Pérez (born 24 March 1981) is a Cuban archer. She competed in the women's individual event at the 2000 Summer Olympics.
