= Yun Mi-jin =

South Korean archer (born 1983)

- Hangul: 윤미진
- Hanja: 尹美進
- RR: Yun Mijin
- MR: Yun Mijin

Yun Mi-jin
Medal record

Women's recurve archery

Representing South Korea

Olympic Games
Gold medal – first place	2000 Sydney	Individual
Gold medal – first place	2000 Sydney	Team
Gold medal – first place	2004 Athens	Team

World Championships
Gold medal – first place	2003 New York City	Individual
Gold medal – first place	2003 New York City	Team
Gold medal – first place	2005 Madrid	Team

Asian Games
Gold medal – first place	2002 Busan	Team
Gold medal – first place	2006 Doha	Team
Bronze medal – third place	2002 Busan	Individual

Asian Championships
Silver medal – second place	2005 New Delhi	Team
Bronze medal – third place	2005 New Delhi	Individual

Summer Universiade
Gold medal – first place	2003 Daegu	Team
Gold medal – first place	2005 Izmir	Team
Silver medal – second place	2003 Daegu	Individual

Yun Mi-jin (Korean: 윤미진; born April 30, 1983) is an archer from South Korea who has won three Olympic gold medals and is a former world number one. She holds the Olympic record for a women's 18-arrow match, at 173 out of a possible 180. Yun set the record in Sydney, Australia at the 2000 Summer Olympics and matched it in 2004 in Athens, Greece.

== Career ==
At the 2000 Summer Olympics Yun placed 4th in the individual ranking round with a score of 661. In the first elimination round she beat Erika Reyes of Mexico 168-157. In the round of 32, she defeated Anna Karaseva of Belarus 162-152. In round 16, she broke the Olympic record in women's 18-arrow match in defeat of Alison Williamson of Great Britain 173 to 164.

In the quarterfinals, Yun defeated Natalia Bolotova of Russia 110-105 in a 12-arrow match, and in the semi-finals the eventual bronze-medalist and compatriot Kim Soo-nyung 107-105. In the final, she captured the gold by a mere point, when Yun defeated Kim Nam-soon 107-106.

At the 2004 Summer Olympics, Yun placed 3rd in the women's individual ranking round with a 72-arrow score of 673. In the first round of elimination, she faced 62nd-ranked Hanna Karasiova of Belarus. Yun defeated Karasiova 162-155 in the 18-arrow match to advance to the round of 32. In that round, she faced 35th-ranked Japanese archer Sayami Matsushita, defeating 173-149 and tying her own Olympic record for score in an 18-arrow match. Yun then defeated 19th-ranked Jennifer Nichols of the United States 168-162, advancing to the quarterfinals.

In the quarterfinals, Yun faced Yuan Shu-chi of Chinese Taipei, losing to the 6th-ranked archer to end the Korean team's hopes of sweeping the medals. The final score of 107-105 in the 12-arrow match placed Yun 5th overall in women's individual archery.

She competed in the 2002 Asian Games, where she won a gold medal in the team event and a bronze medal in the individual event, and at the 2006 Asian Games where she won a gold medal in the team event.

== See also ==
- List of South Korean archers
- Yun (Korean name)
- Gungdo
