= Vladlena Priestman =

British archer (born 1967)

Personal information
- Nationality: British
- Born: 19 September 1967 (age 57); Sumy, Ukraine

Sport
- Sport: Archery

Vladlena Priestman (born 19 September 1967) is a British archer. She competed in the women's individual event at the 2000 Summer Olympics.
