= Anna Łęcka =

Polish archer (born 1980)

Personal information
- Full name: Anna Łęcka-Dobrowolska
- Born: 7 January 1980 (age 46) Skaryszew, Poland
- Height: 171 cm (5 ft 7 in)
- Weight: 57 kg (126 lb)

Sport
- Country: Poland
- Sport: Archery

Anna Łęcka (born 7 January 1980) is a Polish archer. She competed in the women's individual and team events at the 2000 Summer Olympics.
