= Edisbel Martínez =

Cuban archer (born 1979)

Personal information
- Born: 14 September 1979 (age 45); Sancti Spíritus, Cuba

Sport
- Sport: Archery

Edisbel Martínez (born 14 September 1979) is a Cuban archer. She competed in the women's individual event at the 2000 Summer Olympics.
