= Cristina Ioriatti =

Italian archer (born 1973)

Personal information
- Born: 19 January 1973 (age 52); Trento, Italy

Sport
- Sport: Archery

Cristina Ioriatti (born 19 January 1973) is an Italian former archer. She competed in the women's individual and team events at the 2000 Summer Olympics.
