= Katri Suutari =

Finnish archer (born 1976)

Personal information
- Nationality: Finnish
- Born: 8 April 1976 (age 48); Kouvola, Finland

Sport
- Sport: Archery

Katri Suutari (born 8 April 1976) is a Finnish archer. She competed in the women's individual event at the 2000 Summer Olympics.
