= Chiu Ping-kun =

Taiwanese archer (born 1964)

Chiu Ping-kun (Chinese: 邱炳坤; pinyin: Qiū Bǐngkūn; born January 2, 1964) is a Taiwanese archer and coach. He obtained a Ph.D. from the University of Northern Colorado. He is also an international archery judge. Chiu participated in the 1988 Summer Olympics. Prior to succeeding Kao Chun-hsiung as president of National Taiwan Sport University, Chiu led the NTSU Graduate Institute of Coaching Science. Chiu has also served as executive director of Taiwan's National Sports Training Center.
