= Viničné =

Viničné Hattyúpatak
- Municipality
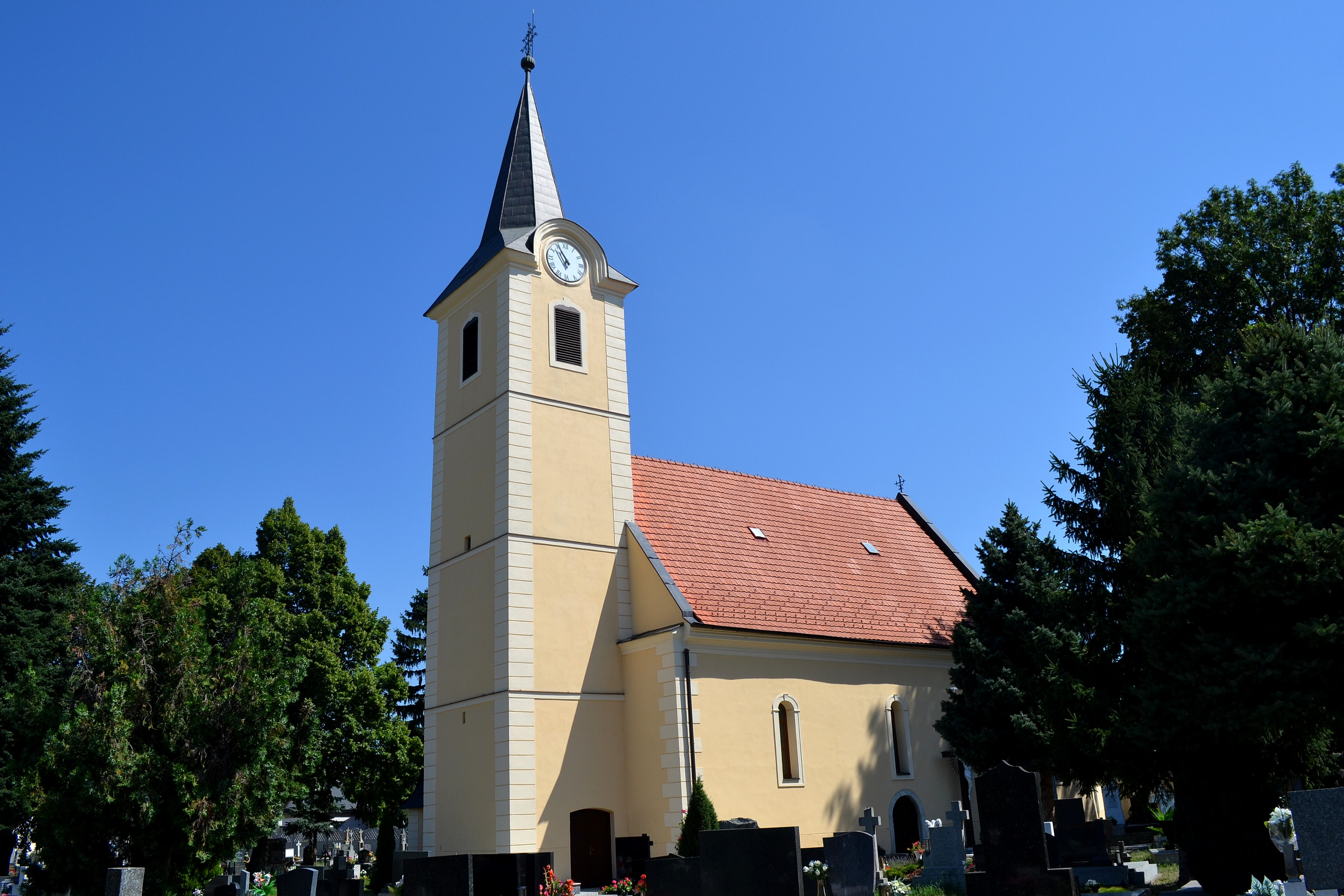
- Church of St. Philip and James

- Flag

- Location of Viničné in the Bratislava Region Location of Viničné in Slovakia
- Coordinates: 48.27°N 17.30°E
- Country: Slovakia
- Region: Bratislava Region
- District: Pezinok District
- First mentioned: 1425

Area
  - Total: 9.62 km^{2} (3.71 sq mi)
- Elevation: 156 m (512 ft)

Population (2025)
  - Total: 2,816
- Time zone: UTC+1 (CET)
  - Summer (DST): UTC+2 (CEST)
- Postal code: 900 23
- Area code: +421 33
- Vehicle registration plate (until 2022): PK
- Website: www.vinicne.sk

Viničné (Hungarian: Hattyúpatak) is a village and municipality in western Slovakia in Pezinok District in the Bratislava region.

The village is known for archery. In 2006, Viničné held the 6th World University Archery Championship.

== Geography ==
The municipality lies at an altitude of 156 metres (512 ft) and covers an area of 9.62 km^{2} (3.71 sq mi) (2025).

== Population ==
Population statistic (10 years)
Year	1995	2005	2015	2025
Count	1421	1669	2316	2816
Difference		+17.45%	+38.76%	+21.58%

Population statistic
Year	2024	2025
Count	2800	2816
Difference		+0.57%

It has a population of 2816 people (31 December 2025).

=== Ethnicity ===
Census 2021 (1+ %)
Ethnicity	Number	Fraction
Slovak	2514	93.56%
Not found out	146	5.43%
Total	2687	

In year 2021 was 2687 people by ethnicity 2514 as Slovak, 146 as Not found out, 26 as Czech, 16 as Rusyn, 12 as Other, 7 as Romanian, 6 as Hungarian, 4 as German, 3 as Polish, 3 as English, 2 as Russian, 2 as Moravian, 2 as Canadian, 1 as Chinese, 1 as Irish, 1 as Vietnamese, 1 as Ukrainian, 1 as Italian, 1 as Serbian, 1 as Romani and 1 as Bulgarian.

Note on population: The difference values of population numbers in the table "Population statistic" and in the sections "Ethnicity" & "Religion" is caused by the use of various statistical methods.

=== Religion ===
Census 2021 (1+ %)
Religion	Number	Fraction
Roman Catholic Church	1470	54.71%
None	820	30.52%
Evangelical Church	163	6.07%
Not found out	146	5.43%
Greek Catholic Church	35	1.3%
Total	2687	

In year 2021 was 2687 people by religion 1470 from Roman Catholic Church, 820 from None, 163 from Evangelical Church, 146 from Not found out, 35 from Greek Catholic Church, 17 from Ad hoc movements, 6 from Christian Congregations in Slovakia, 6 from Other, 6 from Buddhism, 5 from Other and not ascertained christian church, 4 from Paganism and natural spirituality, 3 from Calvinist Church, 2 from Eastern Orthodox Church, 2 from Apostolic Church, 1 from Hinduism and 1 from Church of the Brethren.
