= Stephanie Arnold =

American archer

Stephanie White-Arnold, now Stephanie Amick (born January 23, 1978), is an athlete from the United States who competed in archery.

Amick represented the U.S. at the 2004 Summer Olympics. She placed 36th in the women's individual ranking round with a 72-arrow score of 623. In the first round of elimination, she faced 29th-ranked Melissa Jennison of Australia. Arnold lost 132–121 in the 18-arrow match, placing 61st overall in women's individual archery.

Amich was also a member of the 13th-place American women's archery team.

Amick is from Fishers, Indiana.
