= Georgia at the 2000 Summer Olympics =

- Flag of Georgia
- IOC code: GEO
- NOC: Georgian National Olympic Committee
- Website: www.geonoc.org.ge (in Georgian and English)

in Sydney
- Competitors: 36 (27 men and 9 women) in 12 sports
- Flag bearer: Giorgi Asanidze
- Medals Ranked 68th: Gold 0 Silver 0 Bronze 6 Total 6

Summer Olympics appearances (overview)
- 1996; 2000; 2004; 2008; 2012; 2016; 2020; 2024

Other related appearances
- Russian Empire (1900–1912); Soviet Union (1952–1988); Unified Team (1992)

Georgia competed at the 2000 Summer Olympics in Sydney, Australia. This was the country's second appearance at the Summer Olympics.

== Medalists ==
Medal	Name	Sport	Event
Bronze	Vladimer Chanturia	Boxing	Heavyweight
Bronze	Giorgi Vazagashvili	Judo	Men's 66 kg
Bronze	Giorgi Asanidze	Weightlifting	Men's 85 kg
Bronze	Akaki Chachua	Wrestling	Men's Greco-Roman 63 kg
Bronze	Mukhran Vakhtangadze	Wrestling	Men's Greco-Roman 85 kg
Bronze	Eldar Kurtanidze	Wrestling	Men's Freestyle 97 kg

== Results by event ==
=== Archery ===
In its second Olympic archery competition, Georgia sent three women. None won a match, and the trio lost their first match in the team round as well.

Women's individual
	Khatuna Phutkaradze			Khatuna Lorigi			Asmat Diasamidze		
1/32 eliminations	Lost to	Kate Fairweather; Australia	166-158	Lost to	Melissa Jennison; Australia	160-151	Lost to	Yi-Yin Lin; Chinese Taipei	158-140

Women's team:

- Phutkaradze, Lorigi, and Diasamidze – Round of 16, 12th place (0-1)

=== Athletics ===
Men's 100m

- Ruslan Rusidze

- Round 1 – 10.7 (→ did not advance)

Women's 100m

- Tamara Shanidze

- Round 1 – 12.56 (→ did not advance)

=== Boxing ===
Men's Bantamweight (– 54 kg)

- Theimuraz Khurtsilava
  - Round 1 – Defeated Aram Ramazyan of Armenia
  - Round 2 – Lost to Raimkul Malakhbekov of Russia (→ did not advance)

Men's Heavyweight (– 91 kg)

- Vladimer Chanturia
  - Round 1 – Bye
  - Round 2 – Defeated Amro Mostafa Mahmoud of Egypt
  - Quarterfinal – Defeated Ruslan Chagaev of Uzbekistan
  - Semifinal – Lost to Sultanahmed Ibzagimov of Russia – Bronze medal

=== Diving ===
==== Women's competition ====
Athlete	Event	Preliminary		Semifinal		Final	
Athlete	Event	Points	Rank	Points	Rank	Points	Rank
Nana Nebieridze	10 m platform	252.09	26	did not advance			

=== Swimming ===
==== Men's competition ====
Athlete	Event	Heat		Semifinal		Final	
Athlete	Event	Time	Rank	Time	Rank	Time	Rank
Zurab Beridze	50 m freestyle	24.28	54	did not advance			

=== Weightlifting ===
Men

Athlete	Event	Snatch			Clean & Jerk			Total	Rank
Athlete	Event	1	2	3	1	2	3	Total	Rank
Giorgi Asanidze	– 85 kg	~~175.0~~	175.0	180.0	210.0	~~215.0~~	~~215.0~~	390.0	3rd place, bronze medalist(s)
Mukhran Gogia	– 105 kg	~~190.0~~	—	—	—	—	—	DNF	—
Valeri Sarava	+ 105 kg	~~170.0~~	170.0	~~177.5~~	210.0	215.0	~~220.0~~	385.0	16
