= Erika Reyes =

Mexican archer (born 1973)

Personal information
- Born: 13 October 1973 (age 52) Mexico City, Mexico

Sport
- Sport: Archery
Medal record
Representing Mexico
Pan American Games
| Silver medal – second place | 2003 Santo Domingo | Team |
| Bronze medal – third place | 1999 Winnipeg | Team |
Central American and Caribbean Games
| Gold medal – first place | 2002 San Salvador | Individual recurve (70m) |
| Gold medal – first place | 2002 San Salvador | Recurve team |
| Silver medal – second place | 1993 Ponce | Recurve team |

Erika Reyes Evaristo (born 13 October 1973) is a Mexican archer. She competed in the women's individual event at the 2000 Summer Olympics.
