= Karen Scavotto =

American archer (born 1982)

Personal information
- Full name: Karen Patricia Scavotto
- Born: April 17, 1982 (age 44) Danbury, Connecticut, U.S.
- Height: 5 ft 6 in (167 cm)
- Weight: 119 lb (54 kg)
Medal record
Women's Archery
Representing the United States
Pan American Games
| Bronze medal – third place | 2007 Rio de Janeiro | Team |

Karen Patricia Scavotto (born April 17, 1982 in Danbury, Connecticut) is an American archer. She now resides in Enfield, Connecticut, and is an alumna of Enfield High School. She is currently ranked fifth in the world by the International Archery Federation. She competed in archery at the 2000 Summer Olympics, placing 14th in the Women's Individual competition.
