= World University Archery Championships =

Archery competition

The World University Archery Championships, an international competition in archery, have been held in alternate years from 1996 to 2016, each time in a different host city. There are events using the recurve and compound bows.

== Edition ==
Number	Year	Location	Events
1	1996	(France) Vaulx-en-Velin	4
2	1998	(Taiwan) Taoyuan	8
3	2000	(Spain) Madrid	8
4	2002	(Thailand) Chonburi	8
5	2003	(South Korea) Busan	8
6	2004	(Spain) Madrid	8
7	2005	(Turkey) İzmir	8
8	2006	(Slovakia) Viničné	10
9	2008	(Taiwan) Tainan	10
10	2009	(Serbia) Belgrade	10
11	2010	(China) Shenzhen	10
12	2011	(China) Shenzhen	10
13	2012	(Spain) Córdoba	10
14	2014	(Poland) Legnica	10
15	2015	(South Korea) Gwangju	10
15	2016	(Mongolia) Ulaanbaatar	10
16	2017	(Taiwan) Taipei	10

== Champions ==
=== Recurve ===
Year	Location	Men's Individual	Women's Individual	Men's Team	Women's Team	Mixed Team	Ref
1996	(France) Vaulx-en-Velin	Yaroslav Kolesnik (ISR)	Chang Hsiao-Feng (TPE)				
1998	(Taiwan) Taoyuan	Chang Chia-Ping (TPE)	Deniz Gunay (TUR)	South Korea	South Korea		
2000	(Spain) Madrid	Guy Krueger (USA)	Yang Jianping (CHN)	Belgium	China		
2002	(Thailand) Chonburi	Jeff Henckels (LUX)	Kim Mun-Joung (KOR)	South Korea	South Korea		
2004	(Spain) Madrid	Gye Dong-Hyun (KOR)	Lee Hyun-Jung (KOR)	Chinese Taipei	China		
2006	(Slovakia) Viničné	Lee Jong-Young (KOR)	Hiroko Taguma (JPN)	Chinese Taipei	Poland	South Korea	
2008	(Taiwan) Tainan	Wang Cheng-Pang (TPE)	Ki Bo-Bae (KOR)	Chinese Taipei	South Korea	Chinese Taipei	
2010	(China) Shenzhen	Kim Seong-Hoon (KOR)	Jo Eun-Ae (KOR)	Japan	South Korea	Italy	
2012	(Spain) Córdoba	Kim Bong-Man (KOR)	Park Seayane (KOR)	South Korea	South Korea	South Korea	
2014	(Poland) Legnica	Luis Álvarez (MEX)	Tan Ya-ting (TPE)	Chinese Taipei	South Korea	South Korea	
2016	(Mongolia) Ulaanbaatar	Galsan Bazarzhapov (RUS)	Kang Chae-young (KOR)	South Korea	South Korea	South Korea	

=== Compound ===
Year	Location	Men's Individual	Women's Individual	Men's Team	Women's Team	Mixed Team	Ref
1996	(France) Vaulx-en-Velin	Franck Dauphin (FRA)	Anna Campagnoli (ITA)				
1998	(Taiwan) Taoyuan	John Blaschke (USA)	Shih Ya-Ping (TPE)	United States	Chinese Taipei		
2000	(Spain) Madrid	Tsai Sung-Pin (TPE)	Jamie van Natta (USA)	United States	United States		
2002	(Thailand) Chonburi	Adam Wheatcroft (USA)	Mary Zorn (USA)	United States	United States		
2004	(Spain) Madrid	Choi Yong-Hee (KOR)	Mary Zorn (USA)	South Korea	United States		
2006	(Slovakia) Viničné	Braden Gellenthien (USA)	Amandine Bouillot (FRA)	United States	France	United States	
2008	(Taiwan) Tainan	Jedd Greschock (USA)	Erika Anschutz (USA)	Mexico	South Korea	United States	
2010	(China) Shenzhen	Adam Gallant (USA)	Vida Halimian (IRI)	United States	United States	United States	
2012	(Spain) Córdoba	Daniel Suter (USA)	Kristina Berger (GER)	Italy	United States	United States	
2014	(Poland) Legnica	Vladyslav Bolshakov (UKR)	Katia D'Agostino (ITA)	South Korea	Mexico	South Korea	
2016	(Mongolia) Ulaanbaatar	Kim Jong-ho (KOR)	Ko Soyoung (KOR)	South Korea	India	South Korea	
