= Choe Ok-sil =

North Korean archer (born 1974)

Personal information
- Born: 29 January 1974 (age 52)

Korean name
- Hangul: 최옥실
- RR: Choe Oksil
- MR: Ch'oe Oksil

Sport
- Country: North Korea
- Sport: Archery
- Event: recurve
- Updated on 10 September 2015

Choe Ok-sil (Korean: 최옥실; born 29 January 1974) is a female North Korean recurve archer.

== Career ==
Choe represented her country in the individual event at the 2000 Summer Olympics. She got 4th place in the individual event at the 2000 Summer Olympics. It was North Korea's best Olympics Archery performance. She competed in the individual recurve event and the team recurve event at the 2015 World Archery Championships in Copenhagen, Denmark.
