= Petra Ericsson =

Swedish archer (born 1973)

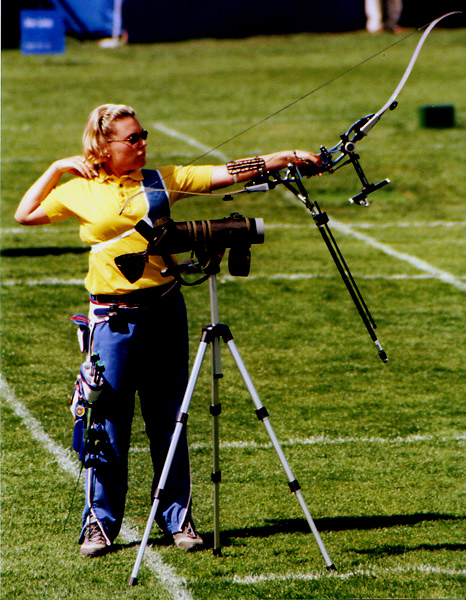

Medal record

Women's archery

Representing Sweden

World Cup
Gold medal – first place	2007 Dubai	Individual

Petra Ericsson (born 1 June 1973 in Mölndal, Sweden) is a Swedish athlete who competes in compound archery.

== Career ==
Ericsson participated in 1989 and 1991 World Indoor Archery Championships coming to 8th and 4th places respectively. During the Archery World Championships in 1991, she faced numerous personal problems after deciding to try compound discipline over recurve. Despite it, during that time she achieved her world record stage. Ericksson also showed competence in Indoor, Outdoor and Field World Archery Championships and World Games, winning numerous medals in both sports in the 1990s. During the 2000 Summer Olympics in Sydney, Australia, she competed in recurve category, where she finished 9th in the ranking round before losing to Joanna Nowicka in the second round of the knockout competition.

In 2001, she was a quarter finalist at the World Archery Championships and in 2005 World Games.

While the Swedish National Olympic Committee didn't select her to compete in 2004 Summer Olympics, Ericsson did however participated in the 2006 Archery World Cup.

Ericsson participated in the women's individual compound of the 2007 Archery World Cup getting 9th place and was a silver medalist at the 2007 Archery World Cup in the same discipline. After switching to the compound discipline, she achieved success winning the 2007 FITA Archery World Cup final in Dubai, also winning the second stage in Varese. She achieved a career-high ranking of 2 (behind Jamie Van Natta in April 2008, by defeating Anna Kazantseva in semifinals.

After a long break to start a family (she gave birth to a baby in 2008), with her coach and husband Mats Inge, Ericsson returned to archery and put on outstanding performance at the Tournament of Nîmes in 2012. During the event, Ericsson tied with Danielle Brown and then secured her bronze after defeating Patricia Leger in the finals.
