= Sydney International Archery Park =

Stadium in Sydney, New South Wales, Australia

Coordinates: 33°50′02″S 151°04′23″E

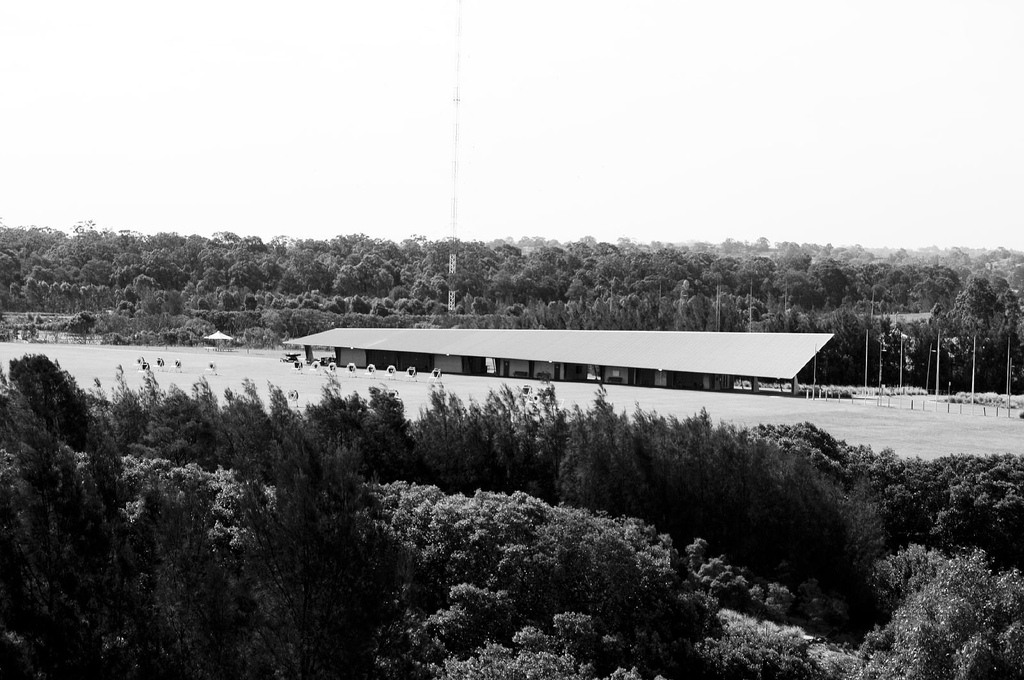
Sydney International Archery Park

The Sydney International Archery Park is a stadium is located in the Sydney Olympic Park suburb of Sydney, New South Wales, Australia. It was specially designed for archery during the 2000 Summer Olympics. It was designed by Stutchbury and Pape.

The Archery Centre is located opposite the Waterfront Apartments on Bennelong Parkway, and is about 3 km from Sydney Olympic Park town centre. The venue hosts a wide range of events, such as school holiday programs for kids, beginners' courses, school programs, casual archers and professional coaching. There are facilities available for corporate team building, as well as laser clay pigeon shooting. The venue sports a 100 x 10 metre Archery pavilion, and has parking spaces for bicycles and 80 motor vehicles. Simon Fairweather won the first ever gold medal for Australia during the Sydney 2000 Olympic games.

== See also ==
- 2000 Summer Olympics venues
- List of sports venues in Australia
