= Agata Bulwa =

Polish archer (born 1975)

Personal information
- Nationality: Polish
- Born: 4 September 1975 (age 49); Dąbrowa Tarnowska, Poland

Sport
- Sport: Archery

Agata Bulwa (born 4 September 1975) is a Polish archer. She competed in the women's individual and team events at the 2000 Summer Olympics.
