= Nataliya Burdeyna =

Ukrainian archer (born 1974)

Medal record

Women's archery

Representing Ukraine

Olympic Games
Silver medal – second place	2000 Sydney	Team

World Championships
Silver medal – second place	2005 Madrid	Team
Bronze medal – third place	2003 New York City	Team

World Indoor Championships
Gold medal – first place	2005 Aalborg	Individual
Silver medal – second place	2005 Aalborg	Team
Bronze medal – third place	2001 Florence	Team
Bronze medal – third place	2001 Florence	Individual

Nataliya Andriivna Burdeyna (Ukrainian: Наталія Андріївна Бурдейна, romanized: Nataliia Andriivna Burdeina; born 30 January 1974) is a Ukrainian archer.

== Life ==
Burdeyna was born in Odesa in 1974.

Burdeyna was part of the Ukrainian team at the 2000 Summer Olympics, where they won the silver medal. In the individual competition she finished 17th after losing the round of 32.

She again represented Ukraine at the 2004 Summer Olympics. She placed 12th in the women's individual ranking round with a 72-arrow score of 643. In the first round of elimination, she faced 53rd-ranked Sayoko Kawauchi of Japan. Burdeyna, in a major upset, lost 137-129 in the 18-arrow match, dropping to 55th overall in women's individual archery.

Burdeyna was also a member of the 6th-place Ukrainian team in the women's team archery competition.

In 2005 she won a gold individual medal at the World Indoor championships.
