= Lindsay Pearson =

South African cricketer (born 1955)

Personal information
- Born: 30 December 1955 (age 70); Bedford, South Africa
- Source: Cricinfo, 12 December 2020

Lindsay Pearson (born 30 December 1955) is a South African cricketer. He played in four first-class matches for Border in 1982/83 and 1983/84.

== See also ==
- List of Border representative cricketers
