= National Sports Training Center =

Sport center in Zuoying, Kaohsiung, Taiwan

- 國家運動訓練中心
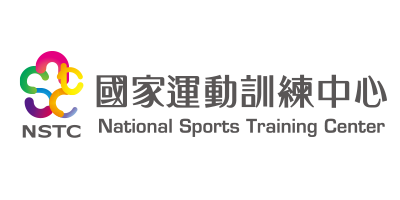

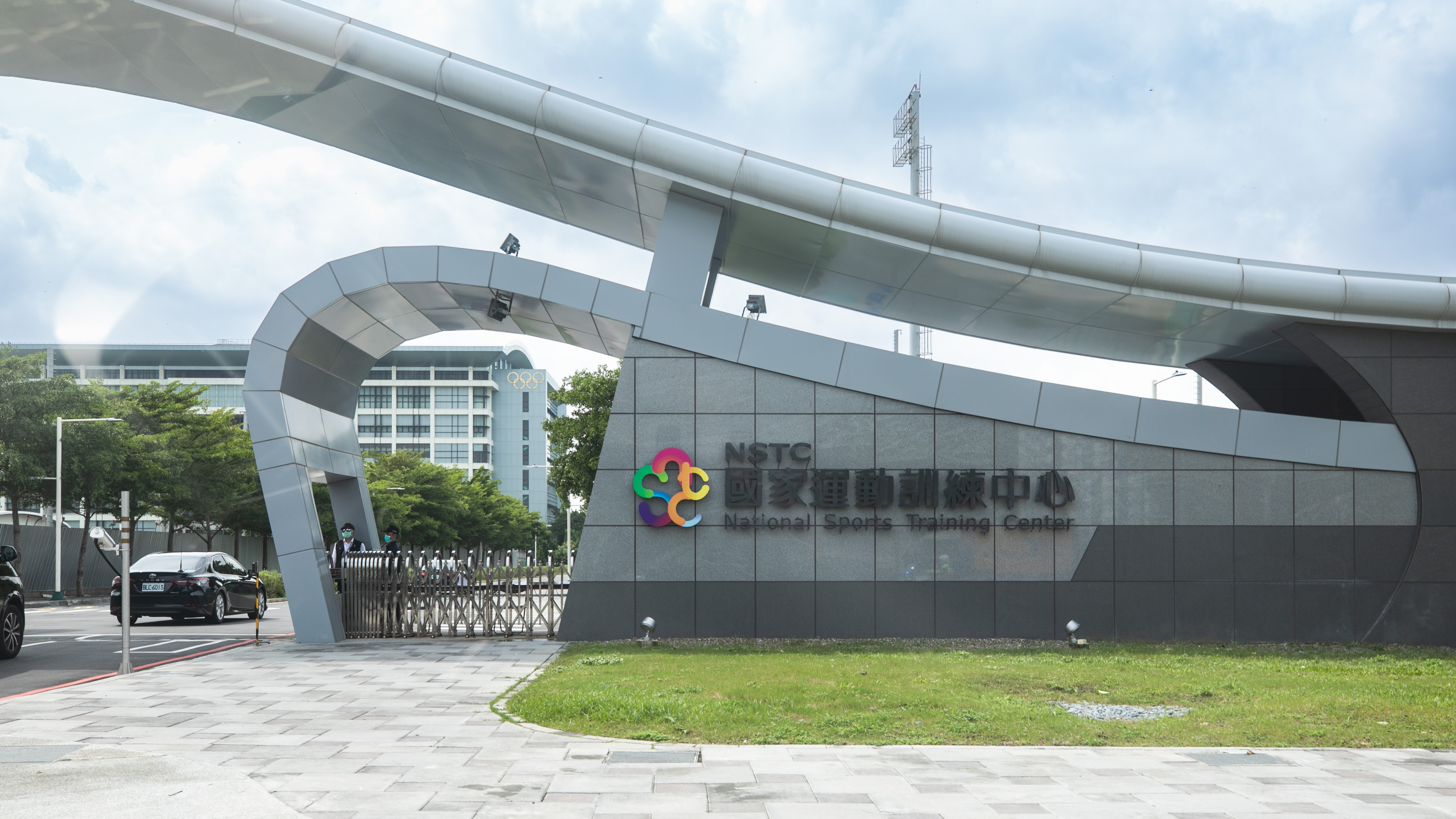
- Interactive map of National Sports Training Center
- Location: Zuoying, Kaohsiung, Taiwan
- Coordinates: 22°41′58.2″N 120°17′35.8″E
- Type: sport center
- Surface: 22 hectares
- Public transit: World Games Station

Construction
- Built: November 1976
- Expanded: May 2015

Website
- Official website

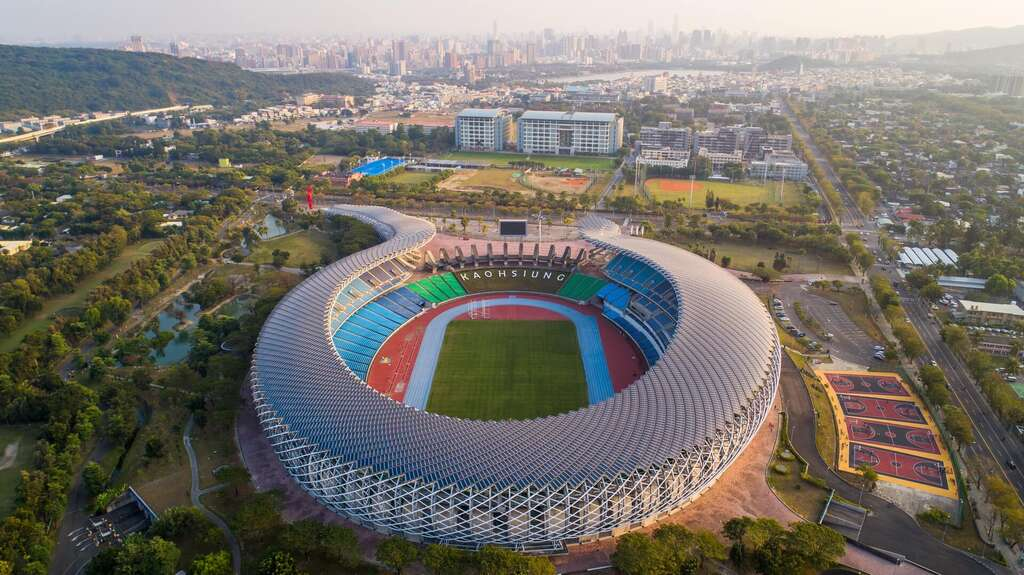
National Sports Training Center and National Stadium (Kaohsiung)

The National Sports Training Center (NSTC; traditional Chinese: 國家運動訓練中心; simplified Chinese: 国家运动训练中心; pinyin: Guójiā Yùndòng Xùnliàn Zhōngxīn) is a sport center in Zuoying District, Kaohsiung, Taiwan. It is dedicated to the training of athletes representing Taiwan in international sporting events.

== History ==
The sport center was originally established in November 1976 as Zuoying Training Center to train athletes that participated for the 1976 Summer Olympics in Montreal, Quebec, Canada. The site was originally a camp operated by the Republic of China Marine Corps 99th Marine Brigade. In December 2000, the sport center was renamed to National Sports Training Center. The original total area was 15 hectares. It has since been expanded to 22 hectares.

The center is under the supervision of the Ministry of Sports.

== Organizational structures ==
- Athlete Education and Training Department
- Competitive Sports Department
- Finance Department
- Operation Department
- Sports Science and Research Department

== Facilities ==
The sport center consists of archery field, baseball field, martial arts hall, multipurpose balls hall, softball field, track and field, slope and sand track, weight training room and meals and lodging building.

The 7-story martial arts hall provides training facility for Martial arts, Boxing, Wrestling, Fencing, Karate, Judo and Taekwondo.

The 7-story multipurpose balls hall provides training facility for Table Tennis, Weightlifting, Basketball, Volleyball, Badminton, Handball and Gymnastics.

The sport center also features an outdoor Olympic-size swimming pool.

== Transportation ==
The sport center is accessible within walking distance west of World Games Station of Kaohsiung MRT.

== See also ==
- Sports in Taiwan
