= Aurore Trayan =

French archer (born 1980)

Personal information
- Nationality: French
- Born: May 11, 1980 (age 45)

Sport
- Sport: Archery

Aurore Trayan (born 11 May 1980) is an athlete from France. She competes in archery.

Trayan represented France at the 2004 Summer Olympics. She placed 60th in the women's individual ranking round with a 72-arrow score of 594. In the first round of elimination, she faced 6th-ranked Zhang Juanjuan of China. Trayan lost 135-122 in the 18-arrow match, placing 59th overall in women's individual archery.

Trayan was also a member of the 4th-place French team in the women's team archery competition.

She stopped recurve archery in 2005 and started compound. She won the European individual FITA compound women championships in 2008 in Vittel.
