= Asmat Diasamidze =

Georgian archer (born 1973)

Personal information
- National team: 2000-2011
- Born: 30 January 1973 (age 53)

Sport
- Country: Georgia
- Sport: Archery
- Event: Recurve
- Updated on 1 August 2015

Asmat Diasamidze (born 30 January 1973) is a Georgian female recurve archer. She competed at the 2000 Summer Olympics in the individual event and team event. She won the gold medal at the 2011 Archery European Indoor Championships in the women's team event.
