= Jennifer Dy Chan =

Filipino archer (born 1965)

Jennifer Chan
Personal information
- Full name: Jennifer Germaine Dy Chan
- Born: January 16, 1965 (age 61)
- Height: 165 cm (5 ft 5 in)
- Weight: 63 kg (139 lb)

Sport
- Country: Philippines
- Sport: Archery
- Coached by: Dionisio Flores (1990s)
- Now coaching: Mark Javier (2008)
Medal record
Women's compound archery
Representing Philippines
World Cup
Bronze medal – third place	2011 Shanghai	Team
Asian Championships
Gold medal – first place	2007 Xi'an	Team
Silver medal – second place	2007 Xi'an	Individual
Southeast Asian Games
Gold medal – first place	2009 Vientiane	Individual
Gold medal – first place	2011 Naypyidaw	Individual
Gold medal – first place	2015 Singapore	Team

Jennifer Germaine Dy Chan (born January 16, 1965) is a Filipino archer who has competed for the Philippines at the 2000 Summer Olympics. She is a resident of Dumaguete.

== Education ==
Chan attended the Silliman University where she obtained a bachelor's degree in general science.

== Career ==
Silliman University physical education instructor and Philippine national archery coach, Dionisio Flores encouraged Chan to take up archery. Before then, Chan was more into basketball and tennis but was convinced since she was told that archery is a sport she could play by herself. Chan trained for eight months before participating at the National Open which gave her a chance to compete in the Southeast Asian Games. According to World Archery, She took up archery in 1989 and debuted for her country in 1990.

Chan first competed in the 1991 edition of the Southeast Asian Games though she didn't medal.

At the 2000 Summer Olympics, Jennifer Chan competed in the women's individual event. She conceded a 143-160 defeat to a Turkish competitor in the first round and finish with a ranking of 59th out of 64 competitors. She then coached Mark Javier who competed in the Archery at the 2008 Summer Olympics.

She won the gold medal at the women’s individual compound event at the 2009 Southeast Asian Games winning 115-112 over Aung Ngeain. Her 2009 participation was supposed to be her last though she participated in the 2011, 2015, and 2017 editions. She won a silver in women's individual in 2011 and a bronze in the women's team event in 2015.

At the 2011 Archery World Cup in Shanghai, she was part of the Philippine team that won a bronze in the women's compound team event.
