= Olga Moroz =

Belarusian archer (born 1966)

Olga Moroz (born 9 December 1966) is an archer from Belarus. She represented her country at the 1996 and the 2000 Summer Olympics in archery.

== 1996 Summer Olympics ==
Moroz scored 645 points in the ranking round and finished 31st out of 64 competitors. In the round of 64 she defeated Cornelia Pfohl 158–152. In the round of 32 she lost 152–147 to Alison Williamson.

== 2000 Summer Olympics ==
Moroz scored 620 points in the ranking round and finished 41st out of 64 competitors. She lost 152–139 to Joanna Nowicka in the 64th round.
