= Archery at the 2000 Summer Olympics =

Archery at the Games of the XXVII Olympiad
- Venue: Sydney International Archery Park
- Dates: 16–20 September 2000
- No. of events: 4 (2 men, 2 women)
- Competitors: 128 from 46 nations

Archery at the 2000 Summer Olympics was held at Sydney International Archery Park in Sydney, Australia with ranking rounds on 16 September and regular competition held from 17 to 20 September. One hundred twenty-eight archers from forty-six nations competed in the four gold medal events—individual and team events for men and for women—that were contested at these games.

The Korean team won three out of the four gold medals contested. Eight Olympic records and three world records were broken at these games.

== Qualification and format ==
There were four ways for National Olympic Committees (NOCs) to qualify berths for individual archers for the Olympics in archery. No NOC was allowed to enter more than three archers. For each gender, the host nation (Australia) was guaranteed three spots. The 1999 World Target Competition's top 8 teams (besides the host nation) each received three spots, and the 19 highest ranked archers after the team qualifiers were removed also received spots. 15 of the remaining 18 spots were divided equally among the five Olympic continents for allocation in continental tournaments. The last three spots in each gender were determined by the Tripartite Commission.

Each NOC that received three places for individual archers (i.e., the host nation, the top 8 teams at the World Target Competition, and any other nation that was able to take 3 of the remaining 37 places) was able to have its three archers compete as a team in the team competition.

All archery at the 2000 Olympics was done from a range of 70 meters. The target consists of concentric circles, and has a total diameter of 122 cm. An archer had 40 seconds to shoot each arrow. 64 archers in each gender took part in the Olympics, with each National Olympic Committee being able to enter a maximum of three archers. Each archer shot 12 ends, or groups, of 6 arrows per end in the ranking round. The score from that round determined the match-ups in the elimination rounds, with high-ranking archers facing low-ranking archers. There were three rounds of elimination that used six ends of three arrows, narrowing the field of archers to 32, then to 16, then to 8. The three final rounds (quarterfinals, semifinals, and medal matches) each used four ends of three arrows.

== Participating nations ==
Forty six nations contributed archers to compete in the events. Below is a list of the competing nations; in parentheses are the number of national competitors.

- American Samoa (1)
- Australia (6)
- Belarus (2)
- Belgium (1)
- Bhutan (2)
- Canada (1)
- Central African Republic (1)
- Chile (1)
- China (6)
- Chinese Taipei (3)
- Cuba (4)
- Denmark (1)
- Egypt (1)
- El Salvador (1)
- Finland (3)
- France (5)
- Georgia (3)
- Germany (4)
- Great Britain (3)
- Greece (1)
- Indonesia (1)
- Italy (6)
- Japan (5)
- Kazakhstan (4)
- Kenya (1)
- North Korea (1)
- South Korea (6)
- Mauritius (1)
- Mexico (2)
- Myanmar (1)
- Netherlands (3)
- New Zealand (2)
- Norway (4)
- Philippines (1)
- Poland (5)
- Portugal (1)
- Russia (4)
- Slovenia (1)
- South Africa (2)
- Spain (1)
- Sweden (6)
- Turkey (6)
- Uganda (1)
- Ukraine (6)
- United States (6)
- Vanuatu (1)

== Medal summary ==
=== Medal table ===
Rank	Nation	Gold	Silver	Bronze	Total
1	South Korea	3	1	1	5
2	Australia	1	0	0	1
3	United States	0	1	1	2
4	Italy	0	1	0	1
4	Ukraine	0	1	0	1
6	Germany	0	0	1	1
6	Netherlands	0	0	1	1
Totals (7 entries)		4	4	4	12

=== Men's ===
Event	Gold	Silver	Bronze
Individual	Simon Fairweather; Australia	Vic Wunderle; United States	Wietse van Alten; Netherlands
Team	South Korea; Jang Yong-ho; Kim Chung-tae; Oh Kyo-moon	Italy; Matteo Bisiani; Ilario Di Buò; Michele Frangilli	United States; Butch Johnson; Rod White; Vic Wunderle

=== Women's ===
Event	Gold	Silver	Bronze
Individual	Yun Mi-jin; South Korea	Kim Nam-soon; South Korea	Kim Soo-nyung; South Korea
Team	South Korea; Kim Nam-soon; Kim Soo-nyung; Yun Mi-jin	Ukraine; Nataliya Burdeyna; Olena Sadovnycha; Kateryna Serdyuk	Germany; Barbara Mensing; Cornelia Pfohl; Sandra Wagner-Sachse

== See also ==
- Archery at the 2000 Summer Paralympics
