= Katja Poulsen =

Danish archer (born 1976)

Personal information
- Nationality: Danish
- Born: 10 December 1976 (age 48)

Sport
- Sport: Archery

Katja Poulsen (born 10 December 1976) is a Danish archer. She competed in the women's event at the 2000 Summer Olympics.
