= Sylvie Pissis =

French archer (born 1963)

Personal information
- Nationality: French
- Born: 24 February 1963 (age 62)

Sport
- Sport: Archery

Sylvie Pissis (born 24 February 1963) is a French archer. She competed in the women's individual event at the 2000 Summer Olympics.
