= Yelena Plotnikova (archer) =

Kazakhstani archer (born 1977)

Personal information
- Nationality: Kazakhstani
- Born: 16 July 1977 (age 47); Ural'sk, Kazakh SSR, Soviet Union

Sport
- Sport: Archery

Yelena Plotnikova (born 16 July 1977) is a Kazakhstani archer. She competed in the women's individual event at the 2000 Summer Olympics.
