= Karin Larsson (archer) =

Swedish archer (born 1976)

Personal information
- Nationality: Swedish
- Born: 16 July 1976 (age 49) Sandviken, Sweden

Sport
- Sport: Archery

Achievements and titles
- Olympic finals: 2000 Summer Olympics

Karin Larsson (born 16 July 1976) is a Swedish archer. Larsson competed in the women's individual and team events at the 2000 Summer Olympics.
