= Liu Pi-yu =

Taiwanese archer

Liu Pi-yu (born 30 January 1969) is an archer who represented Chinese Taipei.

== Archery ==
Liu finished fifteenth at the 1988 Summer Olympic Games in the women's individual event, and eleventh in the women's team event as part of the Chinese Taipei team.

At the 1990 Asian Games she won a silver medal in the women's team event.

In 1992 Liu finished 51st in the women's individual event and eleventh in the women's team event.

At the 2000 Summer Olympic Games Liu scored 647 points and was ranked eighth in the ranking round. She defeated Katja Poulsen 161–152 and lost to Yang Jianping 157–160. Chinese Taipei were eliminated by Turkey in the quarterfinals of the women's team event.
