= Kateryna Serdyuk (archer) =

Ukrainian archer (born 1983)

Medal record

Women's archery

Olympic Games
Silver medal – second place	2000 Sydney	Team

European Championships
Bronze medal – third place	2002 Oulu	Team

Kateryna Valeriyivna Serdyuk (Ukrainian: Катерина Валеріївна Сердюк; born January 22, 1983) is a Ukrainian archer.

She won a silver medal in the team competition at the 2000 Summer Olympics. In the individual event she placed 16th.
