= Barbara Mensing =

German archer (born 1960)

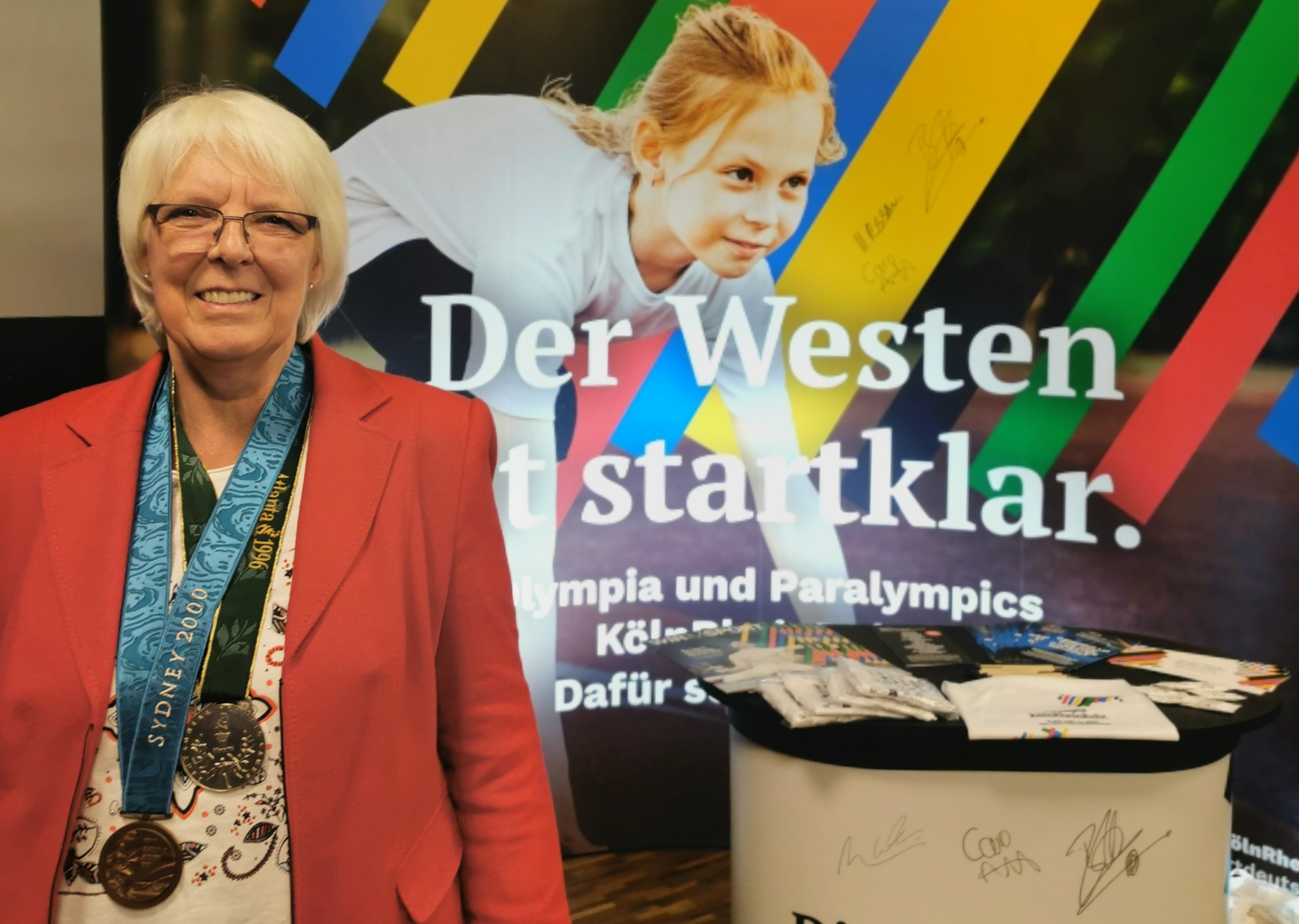

Personal information
- Born: 23 September 1960 (age 65) Herten, North Rhine-Westphalia, West Germany
Medal record
Women's archery
Representing Germany
Olympic Games
Silver medal – second place	1996 Atlanta	Team
Bronze medal – third place	2000 Sydney	Team
World Championships
Silver medal – second place	1995 Jakarta	Individual (recurve)
Bronze medal – third place	1999 Riom	Team (recurve)
European Championships
Silver medal – second place	1994 Nymburk	Individual

Barbara Mensing (born 23 September 1960 in Herten, North Rhine-Westphalia) is an archer from Germany.
