= Olga Pilipova =

Kazakhstani archer (born 1983)

Olga Pilipova (born 9 September 1983) is an athlete from Kazakhstan. She competes in archery. Pilipova represented Kazakhstan at the 2004 Summer Olympics. She placed 48th in the women's individual ranking round with a 72-arrow score of 616. In the first round of elimination, she faced 17th-ranked Naomi Folkard of Great Britain. Pilipova lost 139–128 in the 18-arrow match, placing 57th overall in women's individual archery. She was born in Ural'sk, Kazakh SSR.
