= Mayumi Asano (archer) =

Japanese archer (born 1976)

Personal information
- Nationality: Japanese
- Born: 27 June 1976 (age 48)

Sport
- Sport: Archery

Mayumi Asano (浅野真弓, Asano Mayumi, born 27 June 1976) is a Japanese archer. She competed in the women's individual event at the 2000 Summer Olympics.
