= Yu Hui (archer) =

Chinese archer (born 1980)

Personal information
- Born: 31 March 1980 (age 46) Qingdao, Shandong, China
- Height: 170 cm (5 ft 7 in)
- Weight: 60 kg (132 lb)
Medal record
Women's archery
Representing China
World Championships
Silver medal – second place	1999 Riom	Team
Asian Games
Silver medal – second place	2006 Doha	Team
Bronze medal – third place	2002 Busan	Team

Yu Hui (Chinese: 于慧; born 31 March 1980 in Qingdao, Shandong) is a Chinese archer.

She competed at the 2002 Asian Games where she won a bronze medal in the team event and at the 2006 Asian Games where she won a silver medal in the event.

She also competed at the 2000 Summer Olympics.
