= Kate Fairweather =

Australian archer (born 1975)

- Born: 2 July 1975 (age 50); Subiaco, Western Australia, Australia
- Occupation: Olympic archer

Kate Fairweather (born 2 July 1975, in Subiaco, Western Australia) is an Australian Olympic archer. She was an Australian Institute of Sport scholarship holder.

Fairweather's older brother is archer Simon Fairweather. Her father is Robert Fairweather, founder of the South Australian conservation charity Trees For Life. She won the Australian Junior Championships three times and was selected for the Sydney 2000 Olympic Games. Her results were creditable, coming 22 out of 64 in the individual event and 9 out of 12 in the team event. She retired from archery after the 2000 Games.

She is married to Stephan Schmidt and has two children. She undertook a PhD at the Australian National University.
