= Melissa Jennison =

Australian archer (born 1982)

Melissa Jennison (born 7 May 1982, in Sydney) is an athlete from Australia. She competes in archery. She was an Australian Institute of Sport scholarship holder.

Jennison represented Australia at the 2000 Summer Olympics in Sydney and at the 2004 Summer Olympics in Athens, Greece. In 2004, she placed 29th in the women's individual ranking round with a 72-arrow score of 628. In the first round of elimination, she faced 36th-ranked Stephanie Arnold of the United States. Jennison defeated Arnold, winning 132–121 in the 18-arrow match to advance to the round of 32. In that round, she faced He Ying of China, losing to the 4th-ranked archer in a 9–8 tie-breaker after tying He at 158 in the regulation 18 arrows. Jennison finished 19th in women's individual archery despite breaking her arm in an accident before the competition started.

Jennison was also a member of the 11th-place Australian women's archery team.

On 13 January 2007, she married Ian Mongan, a former Australian representative rower in a ceremony at the National Museum of Australia. She later became a teacher and then an educational leader. Later she had a baby girl named Anna and a son named Thomas.
