= Kim Nam-soon (archer) =

South Korean archer (born 1980)

Olympic medal record

Women's archery

Representing South Korea
Gold medal – first place	2000 Sydney	Team
Silver medal – second place	2000 Sydney	Individual

Kim Nam-soon (born May 7, 1980) was a member of the South Korean Olympic archery team. She won both a gold and a silver medal at the 2000 Summer Olympics.

== See also ==
- Korean archery
- Archery
- List of South Korean archers
