= Yang Jianping (archer) =

Chinese archer (born 1979)

Personal information
- Nationality: Chinese
- Born: 10 December 1979 (age 46) Taiyuan, Shanxi, China
- Height: 171 cm (5 ft 7 in)
- Weight: 75 kg (165 lb)

Sport
- Sport: Archery
- Club: Shanxi Archery Team
Medal record
Women's recurve archery
Representing China
World Championships
Gold medal – first place	2001 Beijing	Team
World University Championships
Gold medal – first place	2000 Madrid	Individual
Asian Games
Bronze medal – third place	2002 Busan	Team

Yang Jianping (Chinese: 楊建平, born 10 December 1979) is a Chinese recurve archer.

Yang competed at the 1996 Summer Olympics where she came 6th in the women's team event and 29th in the individual. She also competed at the 2000 Summer Olympics where she came 6th in the women's team event and 12th in the individual event.

She won a bronze medal at the 2002 Asian Games in the women's team event, a gold medal at the 2001 World Archery Championships in the women's team event and a gold medal at the 2000 World University Archery Championships in the women's individual event.
