= Archery at the 1996 Summer Olympics – Women's individual =

Archery at the Olympics

Women's individual at the Games of the XXVI Olympiad
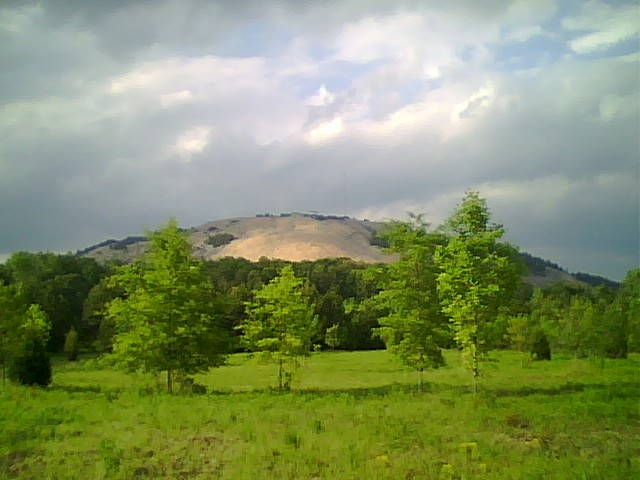
- Site of the former Archery Center at Stone Mountain, where the event took place
- Venue: Stone Mountain Park Archery Center
- Dates: 28–31 July 1996
- Competitors: 64 from 27 nations

Medalists
1st place, gold medalist(s)		Kim Kyung-Wook	South Korea
2nd place, silver medalist(s)		He Ying	China
3rd place, bronze medalist(s)		Olena Sadovnycha	Ukraine

The women's individual was an archery event held as part of the Archery at the 1996 Summer Olympics programme. Like other archery events at the Olympics, it featured the recurve discipline. All archery was done at a range of 70 metres. 64 archers competed.

The same competition format as in 1992 was used, though there were some significant changes. The competition began with a 72-arrow ranking round (down from 144 arrows in 1992). This was followed by three elimination rounds (up from two in 1992), in which archers competed head-to-head in 18-arrow matches (up from 12 arrows in 1992). After these rounds, there were 8 archers left. The quarterfinals, semifinals, and medal matches (collectively termed the "finals round") were 12-arrow matches. In all matches, losers were eliminated and received a final rank determined by their score in that round, with the exception of the semifinals. The losers of the semifinals competed in the bronze medal match.

== Records ==
Natalia Nasaridze set a new Olympic record for an 18-arrow match in the round of 64 by shooting 168. Yoon's score of 331 in the R32/R16 combined set a new Olympic record even as she was defeated by one point in the round. Kim's score of 113 in the gold medal match was an Olympic record. It also contributed to a score of 330 in the 36-arrow finals round beginning with the quarterfinal, another Olympic record.

== Results ==
Ranking	Archer	Nation	Ranking round
1	Lina Herasymenko	Ukraine	673
2	He Ying	China	669
3	Natalia Nasaridze	Turkey	667
4	Kim Jo-Sun	South Korea	663
5	Olena Sadovnycha	Ukraine	663
6	Elif Altınkaynak	Turkey	663
7	Natalia Valeeva	Moldova	662
8	Kim Kyung-Wook	South Korea	661
9	Yoon Hye-Young	South Korea	660
10	Anna Mozhar	Kazakhstan	653
11	Lioudmila Arjannikova	Netherlands	652
12	Joanna Nowicka	Poland	651
13	Makhlukhanum Murzayeva	Russia	650
14	Giovanna Aldegani	Italy	650
15	Alison Williamson	Great Britain	648
16	Yang Jianping	China	648
17	Janet Dykman	United States	646
18	Olga Zabugina	Belarus	645
19	Lin Yi-Yin	Chinese Taipei	644
20	Rita Galinovskaya	Russia	644
21	Lindsay Langston	United States	643
22	Jenny Sjövall	Sweden	643
23	Elena Tutatchikova	Russia	641
24	Sandra Wagner-Sachse	Germany	640
25	Hamdiah Damanhuri	Indonesia	639
26	Kirstin Jean Lewis	South Africa	639
27	Christel Verstegen	Netherlands	639
28	Katarzyna Klata	Poland	639
29	Marisol Bretón	Mexico	638
30	Kristina Persson-Nordlander	Sweden	636
31	Wenche-Lin Hess	Norway	636
32	Wang Xiaozhu	China	636
33	Paola Fantato	Italy	635
34	Irina Leonova	Kazakhstan	635
35	Olga Yakusheva	Belarus	635
36	Giuseppina Di Blasi	Italy	634
37	Khatouna Kurivichvili	Georgia	634
38	Elif Ekşi	Turkey	633
39	Judit Kovács	Hungary	633
40	Séverine Bonal	France	632
41	Lin Ya-hua	Chinese Taipei	632
42	Barbara Mensing	Germany	632
43	Ai Ouchi	Japan	631
44	Yang Chun-chi	Chinese Taipei	630
45	Jargal Otgon	Mongolia	630
46	Yana Tunyantse	Kazakhstan	621
47	Cornelia Pfohl	Germany	621
48	Christa Bäckman	Sweden	617
49	Myfanwy Matthews	Australia	616
50	Deonne Bridger	Australia	615
51	Danahuri Dahliana	Indonesia	615
52	Kinue Kodama	Japan	613
53	Judi Adams	United States	606
54	Nataliya Bilukha	Ukraine	605
55	Nurfitriyana Lantang	Indonesia	600
56	Leanda Hendricks	South Africa	600
57	Iwona Dzięcioł	Poland	599
58	Misato Koide	Japan	583
59	Tímea Kiss	Hungary	582
60	Ugyen Ugyen	Bhutan	580
61	Nadejda Palovandova	Moldova	580
62	Jill Börresen	South Africa	567
63	María Reyes	Puerto Rico	535
64	Jennifer Mbuta	Kenya	500

=== Competition bracket ===
==== Section 1 ====
The #1-ranked archer after the ranking round, Lina Herasymenko, fell in the round of 32.

Round of 64
1	Lina Herasymenko (UKR)	156
64	Jennifer Mbuta (KEN)	126
32	Wang Xiaozhu (CHN)	152
33	Paola Fantato (ITA)	143
16	Yang Jianping (CHN)	159
49	Myfanwy Matthews (AUS)	150
17	Janet Dykman (USA)	156
48	Christa Backman (SWE)	144
8	Kim Kyung-Wook (KOR)	164
57	Iwona Dzięcioł (POL)	158
25	Hamdiah Damanhuri (INA)	151
40	Severine Bonal (FRA)	156
9	Yoon Hye-Young (KOR)	165
56	Leanda Hendricks (RSA)	138
24	Sandra Wagner (GER)	158
41	Lin Ya-Hua (TPE)	162

Round of 32
1	Lina Herasymenko (UKR)	152
32	Wang Xiaozhu (CHN)	156
16	Yang Jianping (CHN)	148
17	Janet Dykman (USA)	154
8	Kim Kyung-Wook (KOR)	159
40	Severine Bonal (FRA)	153
9	Yoon Hye-Young (KOR)	167
41	Lin Ya-Hua (TPE)	155

Round of 16
32	Wang Xiaozhu (CHN)	156
17	Janet Dykman (USA)	149
8	Kim Kyung-Wook (KOR)	165
9	Yoon Hye-Young (KOR)	164

Quarterfinals
32	Wang Xiaozhu (CHN)	103
8	Kim Kyung-Wook (KOR)	106

==== Section 2 ====
Round of 64
4	Kim Jo-Sun (KOR)	163
61	Nadejda Palovandova (MDA)	153
29	Marisol Breton (MEX)	142
36	Giuseppina di Blasi (EST)	139
13	Makhlukhanum Murzayeva (RUS)	147
52	Kinue Kodama (JPN)	159
20	Rita Galinovskaya (RUS)	150^{10}
45	Jargal Otgon (MGL)	150^{6}
5	Olena Sadovnycha (UKR)	153
60	Ugyen Ugyen (BHU)	126
28	Katarzyna Klata (POL)	152
37	Khatouna Kurivichvili (GEO)	148
12	Joanna Nowicka (POL)	165
53	Judi Adams (USA)	152
21	Lindsay Langston (USA)	151
44	Yang Chun-Chi (TPE)	150

Round of 32
4	Kim Jo-Sun (KOR)	158
29	Marisol Breton (MEX)	157
52	Kinue Kodama (JPN)	151
20	Rita Galinovskaya (RUS)	155
5	Olena Sadovnycha (UKR)	158
28	Katarzyna Klata (POL)	151
12	Joanna Nowicka (POL)	152^{9}
21	Lindsay Langston (USA)	152^{8}

Round of 16
4	Kim Jo-Sun (KOR)	164
20	Rita Galinovskaya (RUS)	157
5	Olena Sadovnycha (UKR)	161
12	Joanna Nowicka (POL)	158

Quarterfinals
4	Kim Jo-Sun (KOR)	105
5	Olena Sadovnycha (UKR)	108

==== Section 3 ====
Round of 64
3	Natalia Nasaridze (TUR)	168
62	Jill Borresen (RSA)	140
30	Kristina Persson-Nordlander (SWE)	151
35	Olga Yakusheva (BLR)	159
19	Lin Yi-Yin (TPE)	159
46	Yana Touniiantse (KAZ)	140
14	Giovanna Aldegani (ITA)	157
51	Danahuri Dahliana (INA)	153
6	Elif Altınkaynak (TUR)	155
59	Timea Kiss (HUN)	147
27	Christel Verstegen (NED)	155
38	Elif Eksi (TUR)	150
22	Jenny Sjovall (SWE)	152^{9}
43	Ai Ouchi (JPN)	152^{8}
11	Lioudmila Arjannikova (NED)	149
54	Natalya Bilukha (UKR)	141

Round of 32
3	Natalia Nasaridze (TUR)	153^{8}
35	Olga Yakusheva (BLR)	153^{9}
19	Lin Yi-Yin (TPE)	155
14	Giovanna Aldegani (ITA)	149
6	Elif Altınkaynak (TUR)	160
27	Christel Verstegen (NED)	149
22	Jenny Sjovall (SWE)	151
11	Lioudmila Arjannikova (NED)	160

Round of 16
35	Olga Yakusheva (BLR)	161
19	Lin Yi-Yin (TPE)	157
6	Elif Altınkaynak (TUR)	160
11	Lioudmila Arjannikova (NED)	150

Quarterfinals
35	Olga Yakusheva (BLR)	107
6	Elif Altınkaynak (TUR)	109

==== Section 4 ====
The largest upset of the round of 64 occurred when #55 Nurfitriyana Lantang defeated #10 Anna Mozhar.

Round of 64
7	Natalia Valeeva (MDA)	159
58	Misato Koide (JPN)	141
26	Kirstin Jean Lewis (RSA)	150^{10}
39	Judit Kovacs (HUN)	150^{7}
23	Elena Tutatchikova (RUS)	145
42	Barbara Mensing (GER)	150
10	Anna Mozhar (KAZ)	153
55	Nurfitriyana Lantang (INA)	155
15	Alison Williamson (GBR)	156
50	Deonne Bridger (AUS)	141
18	Olga Zabugina (BLR)	158
47	Cornelia Pfohl (GER)	152
31	Wenche-Lin Hess (NOR)	154
34	Irina Leonova (KAZ)	148
2	He Ying (CHN)	158
63	Maria Reyes (PUR)	123

Round of 32
7	Natalia Valeeva (MDA)	160
26	Kirstin Jean Lewis (RSA)	143
42	Barbara Mensing (GER)	144
55	Nurfitriyana Lantang (INA)	141
15	Alison Williamson (GBR)	152
18	Olga Zabugina (BLR)	147
31	Wenche-Lin Hess (NOR)	163^{7}
2	He Ying (CHN)	163^{10}

Round of 16
7	Natalia Valeeva (MDA)	158
42	Barbara Mensing (GER)	163
15	Alison Williamson (GBR)	159
2	He Ying (CHN)	165

Quarterfinals
42	Barbara Mensing (GER)	93
2	He Ying (CHN)	103

==== Finals ====
Semifinals
Kim Kyung-Wook (KOR)	111
Olena Sadovnycha (UKR)	109
Elif Altınkaynak (TUR)	100
He Ying (CHN)	101

Final
Kim Kyung-Wook (KOR)	113
He Ying (CHN)	107
Bronze medal match
Olena Sadovnycha (UKR)	109
Elif Altınkaynak (TUR)	102

== Sources ==
- Official Report
- Wudarski, Pawel (1999). "Wyniki Igrzysk Olimpijskich" (in Polish). Archived from the original on 18 January 2008.
