= Archery at the 1996 Summer Olympics – Women's team =

Archery at the Olympics

Women's team at the Games of the XXVI Olympiad
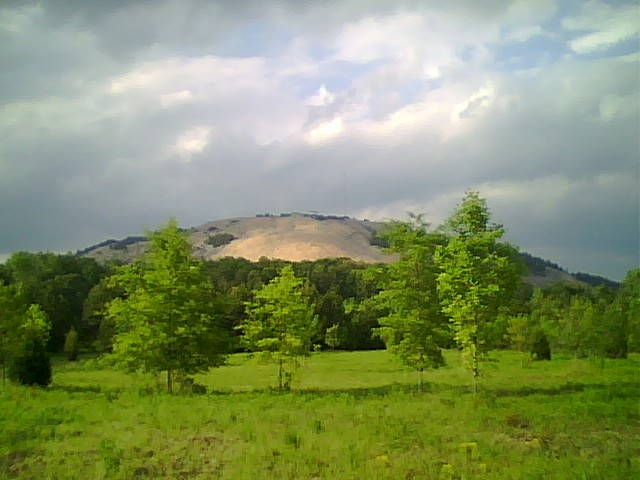
- Site of the former Archery Center at Stone Mountain, where the event took place
- Venue: Stone Mountain Park Archery Center
- Dates: 28 July – 2 August
- Competitors: 45 from 15 nations

Medalists
1st place, gold medalist(s)		Kim Jo-Sun; Kim Kyung-Wook; Yoon Hye-Young	South Korea
2nd place, silver medalist(s)		Barbara Mensing; Cornelia Pfohl; Sandra Wagner-Sachse	Germany
3rd place, bronze medalist(s)		Iwona Dzięcioł; Katarzyna Klata; Joanna Nowicka	Poland

The women's team was an archery event held as part of the Archery at the 1996 Summer Olympics programme.

== Results ==
The ranking for the women's teams was determined by summing the ranking round scores of the three members.

=== Ranking round ===
Rank	Nation	Archers	Score
1	South Korea	Kim Jo-Sun; Kim Kyung-Wook; Yoon Hye-Young	1984
2	Turkey	Elif Altınkaynak; Elif Ekşi; Natalia Nasaridze	1963
3	China	He Ying; Wang Xiaozhu; Yang Jianping	1953
4	Ukraine	Nataliya Bilukha; Lina Herasymenko; Olena Sadovnycha	1941
5	Russia	Rita Galinovskaya; Makhlukhanem Murzayeva; Elena Tutatchikova	1935
6	Italy	Giovanna Aldegani; Giuseppina Di Blasi; Paola Fantato	1919
7	Kazakhstan	Irina Leonova; Anna Mozhar; Yana Touniiantse	1909
8	Chinese Taipei	Lin Ya-Hua; Lin Yi-Yin; Yang Chun-Chi	1906
9	Sweden	Christa Bäckman; Kristina Persson-Nordlander; Jenny Sjöwall	1896
10	United States	Judi Adams; Janet Dykman; Lindsay Langston	1895
11	Germany	Barbara Mensing; Cornelia Pfohl; Sandra Wagner-Sachse	1893
12	Poland	Iwona Dzięcioł; Katarzyna Klata; Joanna Nowicka	1889
13	Indonesia	Danahuri Dahliana; Hamdiah Damanhuri; Nurfitriyana Saiman	1854
14	Japan	Kinue Kodama; Misato Koide; Ai Ouchi	1827
15	South Africa	Jill Borresen; Leanda Hendricks; Kirstin Lewis	1806

=== Knockout stage ===
Round of 16
8	Chinese Taipei	227
9	Sweden	239
5	Russia	229
12	Poland	233
4	Ukraine	246
13	Indonesia	208
3	China	222
14	Japan	217
6	Italy	236
11	Germany	245
7	Kazakhstan	235
10	United States	226
2	Turkey	240
15	South Africa	228

Quarterfinals
1	South Korea	249
9	Sweden	226
12	Poland	242
4	Ukraine	235
3	China	231
11	Germany	232
7	Kazakhstan	226
2	Turkey	247

Semifinals
1	South Korea	245
12	Poland	237
11	Germany	239
2	Turkey	237

Final
1	South Korea	245
11	Germany	235
Bronze medal match
12	Poland	244
2	Turkey	239

== Sources ==
- Official Report
- Wudarski, Pawel (1999). "Wyniki Igrzysk Olimpijskich" (in Polish). Archived from the original on 18 January 2008.
