= Archery at the 1998 Asian Games – Women's individual =

Women's individual recurve at the 1998 Asian Games
- Venue: Thammasat Field
- Dates: 13–15 December 1998
- Competitors: 44 from 12 nations

Medalists
gold medal	Kim Jo-sun	South Korea
silver medal	Lee Eun-kyung	South Korea
bronze medal	Lin Sang	China

The women's individual recurve competition at the 1998 Asian Games in Bangkok, Thailand was held from 13 to 15 December 1998 at Thammasat University.

Kim Jo-sun won the gold medal after beating Lee Eun-kyung in three-arrow shoot-off.

== Schedule ==
All times are Indochina Time (UTC+07:00)

Date	Time	Event
Sunday, 13 December 1998	09:00	Qualification 70 m
Sunday, 13 December 1998	11:00	Qualification 60 m
Monday, 14 December 1998	09:00	Qualification 50 m
Monday, 14 December 1998	11:00	Qualification 30 m
Tuessday, 15 December 1998	08:00	Round of 32
Tuessday, 15 December 1998	08:00	Round of 16
Tuessday, 15 December 1998	14:00	Quarterfinals
Tuessday, 15 December 1998	15:25	Semifinals
Tuessday, 15 December 1998	16:10	Finals

== Results ==
=== Qualification ===
Rank	Athlete	Score
1	Kim Jo-sun (KOR)	1323
2	Lee Eun-kyung (KOR)	1311
3	Chung Chang-sook (KOR)	1299
4	Lin Sang (CHN)	1291
5	Lin Yi-yin (TPE)	1291
6	Lee Mi-jeong (KOR)	1288
7	He Ying (CHN)	1287
8	Wang Xiaozhu (CHN)	1284
9	Liu Pi-yu (TPE)	1277
10	Wang Hong (CHN)	1273
11	Viktoriya Beloslyudtseva (KAZ)	1271
12	Marifi Martinez (PHI)	1262
13	Misa Tsubouchi (JPN)	1255
14	Mayumi Asano (JPN)	1254
15	Purita Joy Marino (PHI)	1248
16	Jennifer Chan (PHI)	1246
17	Yelena Plotnikova (KAZ)	1245
18	Sayoko Kawauchi (JPN)	1233
19	Chang Hsiao-feng (TPE)	1225
20	Nurfitriyana Lantang (INA)	1221
21	Irina Leonova (KAZ)	1217
22	Jenjira Kerdprasop (THA)	1216
23	Chen Hsin-i (TPE)	1215
24	Khin Myo Win (MYA)	1200
25	Ai Ouchi (JPN)	1190
26	Jargalyn Otgon (MGL)	1190
27	Chan Pik Shan (HKG)	1185
28	Dulamsürengiin Dambadarjaa (MGL)	1184
29	Thi Thi Win (MYA)	1180
30	Bishindeegiin Urantungalag (MGL)	1178
31	Lusia Elizabeth Sampow (INA)	1158
32	Tshering Choden (BHU)	1148
33	Dwi Purwanti (INA)	1147
34	Karma Dechog (BHU)	1139
35	Myint Thandar (MYA)	1135
36	Tseveenravdangiin Bayarmaa (MGL)	1132
37	Surang Thaolipoh (THA)	1128
38	Irina Korotkaya (KAZ)	1128
39	Suhartini (INA)	1118
40	Adelinda Figueroa (PHI)	1111
41	Tenzing Lham (BHU)	1096
42	Ubolrat Chukiattikhun (THA)	1092
43	Nuttida Thongpan (THA)	1081
44	Dorji Dema (BHU)	1056

=== Knockout round ===
==== Finals ====
Final
1	Kim Jo-sun (KOR)	109
2	Lee Eun-kyung (KOR)	109

Bronze medal match
4	Lin Sang (CHN)	110
6	Lee Mi-jeong (KOR)	111

- Lin Sang was awarded bronze because of no three-medal sweep per country rule.

==== Top half ====
Round of 32
1	Kim Jo-sun (KOR)	161
32	Tshering Choden (BHU)	130
17	Yelena Plotnikova (KAZ)	145
16	Jennifer Chan (PHI)	147
9	Liu Pi-yu (TPE)	153
24	Khin Myo Win (MYA)	147
25	Ai Ouchi (JPN)	144
8	Wang Xiaozhu (CHN)	155
5	Lin Yi-yin (TPE)	148
28	Dulamsürengiin Dambadarjaa (MGL)	131
21	Irina Leonova (KAZ)	145
12	Marifi Martinez (PHI)	153
13	Misa Tsubouchi (JPN)	155
20	Nurfitriyana Lantang (INA)	151
29	Thi Thi Win (MYA)	134
4	Lin Sang (CHN)	155

Round of 16
1	Kim Jo-sun (KOR)	152
16	Jennifer Chan (PHI)	143
9	Liu Pi-yu (TPE)	151
8	Wang Xiaozhu (CHN)	154
5	Lin Yi-yin (TPE)	146
12	Marifi Martinez (PHI)	150
13	Misa Tsubouchi (JPN)	143
4	Lin Sang (CHN)	153

Quarterfinals
1	Kim Jo-sun (KOR)	104
8	Wang Xiaozhu (CHN)	101
12	Marifi Martinez (PHI)	97
4	Lin Sang (CHN)	100

Semifinals
1	Kim Jo-sun (KOR)	107
4	Lin Sang (CHN)	105

==== Bottom half ====
Round of 32
3	Chung Chang-sook (KOR)	165
30	Bishindeegiin Urantungalag (MGL)	146
19	Chang Hsiao-feng (TPE)	151
14	Mayumi Asano (JPN)	164
11	Viktoriya Beloslyudtseva (KAZ)	146
22	Jenjira Kerdprasop (THA)	156
27	Chan Pik Shan (HKG)	133
6	Lee Mi-jeong (KOR)	165
7	He Ying (CHN)	161
26	Jargalyn Otgon (MGL)	145
23	Chen Hsin-i (TPE)	152
10	Wang Hong (CHN)	156
15	Purita Joy Marino (PHI)	153
18	Sayoko Kawauchi (JPN)	152
31	Lusia Elizabeth Sampow (INA)	139
2	Lee Eun-kyung (KOR)	165

Round of 16
3	Chung Chang-sook (KOR)	145
14	Mayumi Asano (JPN)	151
22	Jenjira Kerdprasop (THA)	152
6	Lee Mi-jeong (KOR)	158
7	He Ying (CHN)	159
10	Wang Hong (CHN)	147
15	Purita Joy Marino (PHI)	136
2	Lee Eun-kyung (KOR)	153

Quarterfinals
14	Mayumi Asano (JPN)	93
6	Lee Mi-jeong (KOR)	107
7	He Ying (CHN)	94
2	Lee Eun-kyung (KOR)	103

Semifinals
6	Lee Mi-jeong (KOR)	97
2	Lee Eun-kyung (KOR)	103
