= Archery at the 1998 Asian Games – Women's team =

Women's team recurve at the 1998 Asian Games
- Venue: Thammasat Field
- Dates: 13–17 December 1998
- Competitors: 43 from 11 nations

Medalists
| gold medal | South Korea; Kim Jo-sun, Lee Eun-kyung, Lee Mi-jeong |
| silver medal | China; He Ying, Lin Sang, Wang Xiaozhu |
| bronze medal | Kazakhstan; Viktoriya Beloslyudtseva, Irina Leonova, Yelena Plotnikova |

The women's team recurve competition at the 1998 Asian Games in Bangkok, Thailand was held from 13 to 17 December 1998 at Thammasat University.

== Schedule ==
All times are Indochina Time (UTC+07:00)

| Date | Time | Event |
|---|---|---|
| Sunday, 13 December 1998 | 09:00 | Qualification 70 m |
| Sunday, 13 December 1998 | 11:00 | Qualification 60 m |
| Monday, 14 December 1998 | 09:00 | Qualification 50 m |
| Monday, 14 December 1998 | 11:00 | Qualification 30 m |
| Thursday, 17 December 1998 | 09:00 | Quarterfinals |
| Thursday, 17 December 1998 | 10:20 | Semifinals |
| Thursday, 17 December 1998 | 11:10 | Finals |

== Results ==
=== Qualification ===
| Rank | Team | Score |
|---|---|---|
| 1 | South Korea (KOR) | 3933 |
| | Chung Chang-sook | 1299 |
| | Kim Jo-sun | 1323 |
| | Lee Eun-kyung | 1311 |
| | Lee Mi-jeong | ~~1288~~ |
| 2 | China (CHN) | 3862 |
| | He Ying | 1287 |
| | Lin Sang | 1291 |
| | Wang Hong | ~~1273~~ |
| | Wang Xiaozhu | 1284 |
| 3 | Chinese Taipei (TPE) | 3793 |
| | Chang Hsiao-feng | 1225 |
| | Chen Hsin-i | ~~1215~~ |
| | Lin Yi-yin | 1291 |
| | Liu Pi-yu | 1277 |
| 4 | Philippines (PHI) | 3758 |
| | Jennifer Chan | 1246 |
| | Adelinda Figueroa | ~~1111~~ |
| | Purita Joy Marino | 1248 |
| | Marifi Martinez | 1262 |
| 5 | Japan (JPN) | 3742 |
| | Mayumi Asano | 1254 |
| | Ai Ouchi | ~~1190~~ |
| | Sayoko Kawauchi | 1233 |
| | Misa Tsubouchi | 1255 |
| 6 | Kazakhstan (KAZ) | 3733 |
| | Viktoriya Beloslyudtseva | 1271 |
| | Irina Korotkaya | ~~1128~~ |
| | Irina Leonova | 1217 |
| | Yelena Plotnikova | 1245 |
| 7 | Mongolia (MGL) | 3552 |
| | Tseveenravdangiin Bayarmaa | ~~1132~~ |
| | Dulamsürengiin Dambadarjaa | 1184 |
| | Jargalyn Otgon | 1190 |
| | Bishindeegiin Urantungalag | 1178 |
| 8 | Indonesia (INA) | 3526 |
| | Nurfitriyana Lantang | 1221 |
| | Dwi Purwanti | 1147 |
| | Lusia Elizabeth Sampow | 1158 |
| | Suhartini | ~~1118~~ |
| 9 | Myanmar (MYA) | 3515 |
| | Khin Myo Win | 1200 |
| | Myint Thandar | 1135 |
| | Thi Thi Win | 1180 |
| 10 | Thailand (THA) | 3436 |
| | Ubolrat Chukiattikhun | 1092 |
| | Jenjira Kerdprasop | 1216 |
| | Surang Thaolipoh | 1128 |
| | Nuttida Thongpan | ~~1081~~ |
| 11 | Bhutan (BHU) | 3383 |
| | Tshering Choden | 1148 |
| | Karma Dechog | 1139 |
| | Dorji Dema | ~~1056~~ |
| | Tenzing Lham | 1096 |

=== Knockout round ===
Quarterfinals
1 | South Korea | 237
8 | Indonesia | 225
5 | Japan | 222
4 | Philippines | 229
3 | Chinese Taipei | 222
6 | Kazakhstan | 222
7 | Mongolia | 208
2 | China | 232

Semifinals
1 | South Korea | 252
4 | Philippines | 224
6 | Kazakhstan | 229
2 | China | 239

Final
1 | South Korea | 242
2 | China | 238
Bronze medal match
4 | Philippines | 217
6 | Kazakhstan | 227
