= 1996 European Indoor Archery Championships =

1996 European Indoor Championships
- Location: Mol, Belgium
- Dates: 14–18 February 1996

The 1996 European Indoor Archery Championships was the 5th edition of the European Indoor Archery Championships. The event was held in Mol, Belgium from 14 to 18 February 1996.

== Medal table ==
* Host nation (Belgium)

Rank	Nation	Gold	Silver	Bronze	Total
1	Italy	3	2	1	6
2	Sweden	3	1	0	4
3	Germany	1	1	1	3
4	Moldova	1	0	0	1
5	France	0	2	1	3
5	Ukraine	0	2	1	3
7	Denmark	0	0	2	2
8	Russia	0	0	1	1
8	Spain	0	0	1	1
Totals (9 entries)		8	8	8	24

== Medal summary ==
=== Recurve ===
Event	Gold	Silver	Bronze
Men's individual	Alessandro Rivolta; Italy	Matteo Bisiani; Italy	Pascal Pelletier; France
Women's individual	Natalia Valeeva; Moldova	Olena Sadovnycha; Ukraine	Barbara Mensing; Germany
Men's team	Sweden; Göran Bjerendal; Magnus Petersson; Mikael Larsson	Italy; Matteo Bisiani; Alessandro Rivolta; Michele Frangilli	Ukraine; Stanislav Zabrodsky; Ihor Parkhomenko; Dmytro Tarasov
Women's team	Germany; Barbara Mensing; Cornelia Pfohl; Astrid Hänschen	Ukraine; Olena Sadovnycha; Lina Herasymenko; Nataliya Bilukha	Russia; Tatyana Plichina; Nataliya Bolotova; Rita Galinovskaya

=== Compound ===
Event	Gold	Silver	Bronze
Men's individual	Mario Ruele; Italy	Markus Groß; Germany	Antonio Tosco; Italy
Women's individual	Petra Ericsson; Sweden	Pernilla Svensson; Sweden	Susanne Kessler; Denmark
Men's team	Italy; Mario Ruele; Antonio Tosco; Giuseppe Agnello	France; Daniel Schneider; Dominique Genet; Stéphane Dardenne	Spain; José García; José Ignacio Catalán; Manel Rojas
Women's team	Sweden; Petra Ericsson; Pernilla Svensson; Ulrika Sjöwall	France; Catherine Deburck; Sophie Cordier; Valérie Fabre	Denmark; Susanne Kessler; Mari Haajanen; Lene Kristensen
