= South Africa at the 1996 Summer Olympics =

- IOC code: RSA
- NOC: South African Sports Confederation and Olympic Committee
- Website: www.sascoc.co.za

in Atlanta
- Competitors: 84 (64 men and 20 women) in 14 sports
- Flag bearer: Masibulele Makepula
- Medals Ranked 27th: Gold 3 Silver 1 Bronze 1 Total 5

Summer Olympics appearances (overview)
- 1904; 1908; 1912; 1920; 1924; 1928; 1932; 1936; 1948; 1952; 1956; 1960; 1964–1988; 1992; 1996; 2000; 2004; 2008; 2012; 2016; 2020; 2024

South Africa competed at the 1996 Summer Olympics in Atlanta, United States. 84 competitors, 64 men and 20 women, and this was the first South African team marched under the new post-Apartheid flag.

== Medalists ==
Medal	Name	Sport	Event	Date
Gold	Penny Heyns	Swimming	Women's 100 metre breaststroke	21 July
Gold	Penny Heyns	Swimming	Women's 200 metre breaststroke	23 July
Gold	Josia Thugwane	Athletics	Men's marathon	4 August
Silver	Hezekiél Sepeng	Athletics	Men's 800 metres	31 July
Bronze	Marianne Kriel	Swimming	Women's 100 metre backstroke	22 July

== Competitors ==
The following is the list of number of competitors in the Games.

Sport	Men	Women	Total
Archery	0	3	3
Athletics	18	4	22
Boxing	5	–	5
Canoeing	0	1	1
Cycling	4	2	6
Field hockey	16	0	16
Judo	1	0	1
Modern pentathlon	1	–	1
Rowing	6	2	8
Sailing	5	0	5
Shooting	2	0	2
Swimming	2	5	7
Tennis	3	3	6
Wrestling	1	–	1
Total	64	20	84

== Archery ==
Women

Athlete	Event	Ranking round		Round of 64	Round of 32	Round of 16	Quarterfinals	Semifinals	Final	
Athlete	Event	Score	Seed	Opposition Score	Opposition Score	Opposition Score	Opposition Score	Opposition Score	Opposition Score	Rank
Jill Börresen	Individual	567	62	Natalia Nasaridze (TUR); L 140–168	Did not advance					
Leanda Hendricks	Individual	600	56	Yoon Hye-Young (KOR); L 138–165	Did not advance					
Kirstin Lewis	Individual	639	26	Judit Kovács (HUN); W 150–150	Natalia Valeeva (MDA); L 143–160	Did not advance				
Jill Börresen; Leanda Hendricks; Kirstin Lewis	Team	1806	15			Turkey; L 228–240	Did not advance			

== Athletics ==
=== Men ===
Track and road events

Athletes	Events	Heat Round 1		Heat Round 2		Semifinal		Final	
Athletes	Events	Time	Rank	Time	Rank	Time	Rank	Time	Rank
Alfred Visagie	200 metres	21.10	68	Did not advance					
Arnau Malherbe	400 metres	45.75	16 Q	45.26	18	Did not advance			
Hendrik Mokganyetsi	400 metres	45.89	22 q	46.48	30	Did not advance			
Bobang Phiri	400 metres	45.94	26 q	45.51	21	Did not advance			
Johan Botha	800 metres	1:45.63	5 q	N/A		1:48.06	19	Did not advance	
Hezekiel Sepeng	800 metres	1:46.45	14 Q	N/A		1:45.16	7 Q	1:42.72	Silver medal
Marius van Heerden	800 metres	1:47.46	31	N/A		Did not advance			
Shadrack Hoff	5000 metres	14:05.97	26 Q	N/A		14:16.14	25	Did not advance	
John Morapedi	5000 metres	13:54.30	11 Q	N/A		13:54.43	19	Did not advance	
Hendrick Ramaala	10000 metres	29:07.81	29	N/A				Did not advance	
Lawrence Peu	Marathon	N/A						2:18:09	27
Josia Thugwane	Marathon	N/A						2:12:36	Gold medal
Gert Thys	Marathon	N/A						2:18:55	33
Llewellyn Herbert	400 metres hurdles	51.13	45	N/A		Did not advance			
Shadrack Mogotsi	3000 metres steeplechase	8:46.24	28	N/A		Did not advance			
Arnaud Malherbe; Hendrik Mokganyetsi; Bobang Phiri; Alfred Visagie	4 x 400 metres relay	3:03.79	13 q	N/A		3:02.96	10	Did not advance	

Field events

Athlete	Event	Qualification		Final	
Athlete	Event	Result	Rank	Result	Rank
Riaan Botha	Pole vault	5.70	1 Q	5.60	14
Okkert Brits	Pole vault	NM		Did not advance	
François Fouché	Long jump	7.44	38	Did not advance	

=== Women ===
Track and road events

Athletes	Events	Heat Round 1		Heat Round 2		Semifinal		Final	
Athletes	Events	Time	Rank	Time	Rank	Time	Rank	Time	Rank
Gwen Griffiths	1500 metres	4:10.80	14 Q	N/A		4:11.12	12 Q	4:06.33	9
Colleen de Reuck	10000 metres	32:39.19	20 Q	N/A				32:14.69	13
Elana Meyer	Marathon	N/A						Did not finish	
Karen van der Veen	400 metres hurdles	57.00	25	N/A		Did not advance			

== Boxing ==
Men

Athlete	Event	Round of 32	Round of 16	Quarterfinal	Semifinal	Final
Athlete	Event	Opposition Result	Opposition Result	Opposition Result	Opposition Result	Opposition Result
Masibulele Makepula	Light-flyweight	Thapa (IND); W RSC	Lozano (ESP); L 14–3	Did not advance		
Phillip N'dou	Featherweight	Patton (CAN); W RSC	Kamsing (THA); L 12–7	Did not advance		
Irvin Buhlalu	Lightweight	Wiangwiset (THA); L 21–5	Did not advance			
Victor Kunene	Light-middleweight	Polakovič (CZE); L 8–1	Did not advance			
Sybrand Botes	Light-heavyweight	Hernández (DOM); W 16–11	Flores (PUR); L 16–7	Did not advance		

== Canoeing ==
=== Sprint ===
Women

Athlete	Event	Heats		Repechage		Semifinals		Final	
Athlete	Event	Time	Rank	Time	Rank	Time	Rank	Time	Rank
Ruth Nortje	K-1 500 m	1:54.695	2 Q	N/A		1:53.611	5	Did not advance	

== Cycling ==
=== Road ===
Men

Athlete	Event	Time	Rank
Doug Ryder	Road race	4:56:47	61
Blayne Wikner	Road race	4:56:52	97

Women

Athlete	Event	Time	Rank
Erica Green	Road race	2:37:21	35
Jackie Martin	Road race	2:53:12	43

=== Track ===
Sprints

Athlete	Event	Qualifying		1/32 finals (Repechage)	1/16 finals (Repechage)	1/8 finals (Repechage)	Quarterfinals	Semifinals	Finals (5th-8th)	
Athlete	Event	Time Speed (km/h)	Rank	Opposition Time Speed (km/h)	Opposition Time Speed (km/h)	Opposition Time Speed (km/h)	Opposition Times Speed (km/h)	Opposition Time Speed (km/h)	Opposition Time Speed (km/h)	Rank
Jean-Pierre van Zyl	Men's sprint	10.695; 67.321	17 Q	Rousseau (FRA); L 11.296; 63.739; Bazálik (SVK); L 11.222; 64.159	Did not advance					

Pursuits

Athlete	Event	Qualifying		1st round		Semifinals		Finals	
Athlete	Event	Time	Rank	Opposition Time	Rank	Opposition Time	Rank	Opposition Time	Rank
David George	Men's individual pursuit	4:39.531	15	Did not advance					

Time trials

Athlete	Event	Time	Rank
Jean-Pierre van Zyl	Men's 1000 metre time trial	1:04.214	5

Points races

Athlete	Event	Finals	
Athlete	Event	Points	Rank
David George	Men's points race	Did not finish	

=== Mountain biking ===
Women

Athlete	Event	Time	Rank
Erica Green	Cross-country	2:03:06	17

== Field Hockey ==
=== Men's tournament ===
Group B

	Team	Points	G	W	D	L	GF	GA	Diff
1.	Netherlands	9	5	4	1	0	14	6	+8
2.	Australia	7	5	3	1	1	13	7	+6
3.	Great Britain	5	5	1	3	1	8	8	0
4.	South Korea	4	5	1	2	2	12	13	−1
5.	South Africa	3	5	0	3	2	7	12	−5
6.	Malaysia	2	5	0	2	3	7	15	−8

Match 6
20:00

South Africa	1 – 1	Australia
Greg Nicol 65'		Mark Hager 61'

Umpires:
Guillaume Langle (FRA)
Steve Horgan (USA)

Match 11
17:30

Malaysia	2 – 2	South Africa
Mirnawan Nawawi 38' (pc); Mirnawan Nawawi 61'		Greg Nicol 26' (pc); Grant Fulton 64' (pc)

Umpires:
Henrik Ehlers (DEN)
Kiyoshi Sana (JPN)

Match 16
09:00

South Korea	3 – 3	South Africa
Park Shin-Heum 27' (pc); Shin Seo-Jyo 51' (pc); Kim Young-Kyu 60'		Greg Nicol 55' (pc); Grant Fulton 67' (ps); Greg Nicol 68' (pc)

Umpires:
Henrik Ehlers (DEN)
Richard Wolter (GER)

Match 23
17:30

South Africa	0 – 2	Great Britain
		Jon Wyatt 14' (pc); Calum Giles 28' (pc)

Umpires:
Steve Horgan (USA)
Eduardo Ruiz (ARG)

Match 30
20:00

Netherlands	4 – 1	South Africa
Bram Lomans 10' (pc); Marc Delissen 13'; Bram Lomans 26' (pc); Taco van den Honert 54'		Greg Nicol 43'

Umpires:
Ayman Amin (EGY)
Ray O'Connor (IRL)

Classification Matches 9-12

9th/12th place
Match 32
08:30

United States	0 – 3	South Africa
		Charles Teversham 34'; Grant Fulton 48' (pc); Craig Fulton 62'

Umpires:
Floris Idenburg (NED)
Ayman Amin (EGY)

9th place match

Ninth place
Match 38
08:30

South Africa	2 – 3	Argentina
Greg Nicol 22' (pc); Matthew Hallowes 38'		Fernando Ferrara 30'; Santiago Capurro 36'; Jorge Lombi 45' (pc)

Umpires:
Craig Madden (GBR)
Guillaume Langle (FRA)

- Team Roster:

- Grant Fulton
- Kevin Chree
- Gregg Clark
- Allistar Fredericks
- Gary Boddington
- Wayne Graham
- Charles Teversham
- Brad Michalaro
- Matthew Hallowes
- Greg Nicol
- Craig Fulton
- Brian Myburgh
- Brad Milne
- Shaun Cooke
- Craig Jackson
- Murray Anderson
- Shayla de Carvalho

== Judo ==
Men

Athlete	Event	Preliminary	Round of 32	Round of 16	Quarterfinals	Semifinals	Repechage 1	Repechage 2	Repechage 3	Final / BM	
Athlete	Event	Opposition Result	Opposition Result	Opposition Result	Opposition Result	Opposition Result	Opposition Result	Opposition Result	Opposition Result	Opposition Result	Rank
Duncan MacKinnon	Men's 65 kg	—N/a	Steffano (URU); W 1000–0000	Csák (HUN); L 0000–1000	Did not advance						

== Modern Pentathlon ==
Men

Athlete	Shooting		Swimming		Fencing		Riding		Running		Total points	Rank
Athlete	Result	Points	Result	Points	Result	Points	Penalties	Points	Result	Points	Total points	Rank
Claud Cloete	183	1,132	3:35.25	1,152	10-22	780	30	1,070	13:17.358	1,174	5,308	15

== Rowing ==
Men

Athlete(s)	Event	Heats		Repechage		Semifinals		Final	
Athlete(s)	Event	Time	Rank	Time	Rank	Time	Rank	Time	Rank
Greg Bayne; John Callie	Coxless pair	7:01.05	6	7:11.14	4	N/A		7:09.91	16
Gareth Costa; Mike Hasselbach; Mark Rowand; Roger Tobler	Lightweight coxless four	6:19.98	1 Q	N/A		6:16.65	4	6:04.13	9

Women

Athlete(s)	Event	Heats		Repechage		Semifinals		Final	
Athlete(s)	Event	Time	Rank	Time	Rank	Time	Rank	Time	Rank
Helen Fleming; Colleen Orsmond	Coxless pair	7:48.69	4	8:11.90	2 Q	7:56.41	6	7:28.30	11

== Sailing ==
Mixed

Athlete	Event	Race											Score	Rank
Athlete	Event	1	2	3	4	5	6	7	8	9	10	11	Score	Rank
David Hibberd	Laser	10	10	20	20	8	17	(31)	13	(29)	18	22	138	16
Rick Mayhew; Bruce Savage; Clynton Wade-Lehman	Soling	17	2	17	11	11	(20)	15	(23)	11	18	N/A	102	17

== Shooting ==
Men

Athlete	Events	Qualification		Final		Total	
Athlete	Events	Score	Rank	Score	Rank	Score	Rank
Mel Hains	Skeet	113	=45	Did not advance		113	=45
Jaco Henn	50 metre rifle three positions	1162	=22	Did not advance		1162	=22
Jaco Henn	50 metre rifle prone	593	=26	Did not advance		593	=26

== Swimming ==
Men

Athlete	Event	Heat		Final B		Final	
Athlete	Event	Time	Rank	Time	Rank	Time	Rank
Brendon Dedekind	50 m freestyle	22.60	4 QA	Did not advance		22.59	5
Brendon Dedekind	100 m freestyle	50.95	26	Did not advance			
Ryk Neethling	400 m freestyle	3:56.19	16 Q	3:54.34	11	Did not advance	
Ryk Neethling	1500 m freestyle	15:19.98	6 QA	Did not advance		15:14.63	5

Women

Athlete	Event	Heat		Final B		Final	
Athlete	Event	Time	Rank	Time	Rank	Time	Rank
Marianne Kriel	50 m freestyle	26.42	24	Did not advance			
Marianne Kriel	100 m backstroke	1:02.33	3 Q	Did not advance		1:02.12	Bronze medal
Marianne Kriel	200 m backstroke	2:15.99	16 Q	2:18.41	16	Did not advance	
Heleen Muller	100 m freestyle	57.98	33	Did not advance			
Heleen Muller	200 m freestyle	2:05.59	30	Did not advance			
Penny Heyns	100 m breaststroke	1:07.02	1 Q	Did not advance		1:07.73	Gold medal
Penny Heyns	200 m breaststroke	2:26.63	1 Q	Did not advance		2:25.41	Gold medal
Julia Russell	100 m breaststroke	1:10.87	18	Did not advance			
Julia Russell	200 m breaststroke	2:32.44	17 Q	2:30.38	12	Did not advance	
Julia Russell	200 m individual medley	2:20.40	27	Did not advance			
Mandy Loots Taryn Ashton	100 m butterfly	1:03.53	30	Did not advance			
Mandy Loots Taryn Ashton	200 m butterfly	2:20.73	30	Did not advance			
Marianne Kriel; Penny Heyns; Mandy Loots; Heleen Muller	4 × 100 m medley relay	4:09.47	5 Q	—N/a		4:08.16	4

== Tennis ==
Men

Athlete	Event	Round of 64		Round of 32		Round of 16		Quarterfinals		Semifinals		Final		
Athlete	Event	Opposition	Score	Opposition	Score	Opposition	Score	Opposition	Score	Opposition	Score	Opposition	Score	Rank
Wayne Ferreira	Singles	Etlis (ARG)	W 6–4 6–3	Black (ZIM)	W 6–3 3–6 6–2	Woodbridge (AUS)	W 7^{7}–6^{3} 7^{7}–6^{5}	Agassi (USA)	L 7–5 6–4 7–5	Did not advance				
Marcos Ondruska	Singles	Ivanišević (CRO)	W 6–2 6–4	Ruud (NOR)	L 7^{8}–6^{6} 7^{7}–6^{1}	Did not advance								
Ellis Ferreira; Wayne Ferreira	Doubles	N/A		(Hungary) Köves, Markovits (HUN)	W 6–1 6–1	(United States) Agassi, Washington (USA)	W 7–5 7^{7}–6^{2} 6–0	(Netherlands) Eltingh, Haarhuis (NED)	L 7^{7}–6^{4} 7^{7}–6^{4}	Did not advance				

Women

Athlete	Event	Round of 64		Round of 32		Round of 16		Quarterfinals		Semifinals		Final		
Athlete	Event	Opposition	Score	Opposition	Score	Opposition	Score	Opposition	Score	Opposition	Score	Opposition	Score	Rank
Amanda Coetzer	Singles	McQuillan (AUS)	W 6–4 7^{7}–6^{5}	Zvereva (BLR)	L 1–6 6–4 '2–6	Did not advance								
Mariaan de Swardt	Singles	Suková (CZE)	W 7^{7}–6^{4} 3–6 7–5	Huber (GER)	L 6–3 1–6 4–6	Did not advance								
Joannette Kruger	Singles	Choi (KOR)	L 7^{7}–6^{5} 2–6 1–6	Did not advance										
Amanda Coetzer; Mariaan de Swardt	Doubles	N/A		(South Korea) Kim, Park (KOR)	W 6–1 6–3	(United Kingdom) Lake, Wood (GBR)	L 5–7 5–7	Did not advance						

== Wrestling ==
Men's freestyle

Athlete	Event	Elimination Pool							Final round	
Athlete	Event	Round 1 Result	Round 2 Result	Round 3 Result	Round 4 Result	Round 5 Result	Round 6 Result	Rank	Final round Result	Rank
Tjaart du Plessis	−62 kg	Tedieiev (UKR); L 1–5	Parsekian (CYP); L 1–3	Did not advance				18	Did not advance	
