= 1998 European Archery Championships =

1998 European Championships
- Location: Boé/Agen, France
- Dates: 17-23 August 1998

The 1998 European Archery Championships is the 15th edition of the European Archery Championships. The event was held in Boé/Agen, France from 17 to 23 August, 1998.

== Medal table ==
* Host nation (France)

Rank	Nation	Gold	Silver	Bronze	Total
1	Italy	2	1	2	5
2	France	2	1	1	4
3	Ukraine	1	0	1	2
4	Germany	1	0	0	1
4	Hungary	1	0	0	1
4	Russia	1	0	0	1
7	Great Britain	0	2	1	3
8	Sweden	0	1	2	3
9	Poland	0	1	0	1
9	Slovenia	0	1	0	1
9	Spain	0	1	0	1
12	Denmark	0	0	1	1
Totals (12 entries)		8	8	8	24

== Medal summary ==
=== Recurve ===
Event	Gold	Silver	Bronze
Men's individual	Russia; Balzynim Cyrempilov	France; Lionel Torres	Ukraine; Ihor Parkhomenko
Women's individual	Ukraine; Lina Herasymenko	United Kingdom; Vladlena Priestman	Italy; Natalia Valeeva
Men's team	Italy; Michele Frangilli; Mario Casavecchia; Ilario Di Buò	Poland; Paweł Szymczak; Grzegorz Targoński; Arkadiusz Ponikowski	France; Sébastien Flute; Lionel Torrés; Jean-François Roche
Women's team	Germany; Britta Buehren; Cornelia Pfohl; Sandra Sachse	Italy; Natalia Valeeva; Cristina Ioriatti; Giovanna Aldegani	Sweden; Petra Ericsson; Karin Larsson; Jenny Sjöwall

=== Compound ===
Event	Gold	Silver	Bronze
Men's individual	France; Thomas Randall	Slovenia; Dejan Sitar	Sweden; Peter Andersson
Women's individual	Italy; Fabiola Palazzini	Spain; Fatima Agudo	United Kingdom; Maryann Richardson
Men's team	Hungary; Ferenc Fodor; Tibor Ondrik; Antal Szokol	Sweden; Peter Andersson; Morgan Lundin; Anders Malm	Denmark; Per Knudsen; Tom Henriksen; Keld Rosengren
Women's team	France; Valérie Fabre; Catherine Pellen; Michèle Deloraine	United Kingdom; Nichola Simpson; Maryann Richardson; Trenamann	Italy; Fabiola Palazzini; Cristina Pernazza; Serena Pisano
