= Kazakhstan at the 1996 Summer Olympics =

- IOC code: KAZ
- NOC: National Olympic Committee of the Republic of Kazakhstan
- Website: www.olympic.kz (in Kazakh, Russian, and English)

in Atlanta
- Competitors: 96 (72 men and 24 women) in 14 sports
- Flag bearer: Yermakhan Ibraimov
- Medals Ranked 24th: Gold 3 Silver 4 Bronze 4 Total 11

Summer Olympics appearances (overview)
- 1996; 2000; 2004; 2008; 2012; 2016; 2020; 2024

Other related appearances
- Russian Empire (1900–1912); Soviet Union (1952–1988); Unified Team (1992)

Kazakhstan competed in the Summer Olympic Games as an independent nation for the first time at the 1996 Summer Olympics in Atlanta, United States. Previously, Kazakhstani athletes competed for the Unified Team at the 1992 Summer Olympics. 96 competitors, 72 men and 24 women, took part in 99 events in 14 sports.

== Medalists ==
Medal	Name	Sport	Event	Date
Gold	Vassiliy Jirov	Boxing	Men's light-heavyweight	4 August
Gold	Alexandre Paryguin	Modern pentathlon	Men's individual	30 July
Gold	Yuriy Melnichenko	Wrestling	Men's Greco-Roman 57 kg	21 July
Silver	Bulat Jumadilov	Boxing	Men's flyweight	4 August
Silver	Sergey Belyayev	Shooting	Men's 50 metre rifle three positions	27 July
Silver	Sergey Belyayev	Shooting	Men's 50 metre rifle prone	25 July
Silver	Anatoly Khrapaty	Weightlifting	Men's 99 kg	28 July
Bronze	Bolat Niyazymbetov	Boxing	Men's light-welterweight	4 August
Bronze	Yermakhan Ibraimov	Boxing	Men's light-middleweight	3 August
Bronze	Vladimir Vokhmianin	Shooting	Men's 25 metre rapid fire pistol	24 July
Bronze	Maulen Mamyrov	Wrestling	Men's freestyle 52 kg	2 August

== Archery ==
Kazakhstan sent six archers to Atlanta. Only one, Vadim Chikarev, won a match in the individual round. Chikarev had competed on the Unified Team in Barcelona. The women's team defeated the United States in the team round.

Men

Athlete	Event	Ranking round		Round of 64	Round of 32	Round of 16	Quarterfinals	Semifinals	Final / BM	
Athlete	Event	Score	Seed	Opposition Score	Opposition Score	Opposition Score	Opposition Score	Opposition Score	Opposition Score	Rank
Vadim Shikarev	Individual	677	4	Küçükkayalar (TUR) W 166–144	Anchondo (MEX) L 154–156	Did not advance				
Vitaliy Shin	Individual	656	59	Tsyrempilov (RUS) L 163–164	Did not advance					
Sergey Martynov	Individual	632	56	Huish (USA) L 165–167	Did not advance					
Vadim Shikarev Vitaliy Shin Sergey Martynov	Team	1935	12	—N/a		Sweden L 247–239	Did not advance			

Women

Athlete	Event	Ranking round		Round of 64	Round of 32	Round of 16	Quarterfinals	Semifinals	Final / BM	
Athlete	Event	Score	Seed	Opposition Score	Opposition Score	Opposition Score	Opposition Score	Opposition Score	Opposition Score	Rank
Anna Mozhar	Individual	653	10	Lantang (INA) L 153–155	Did not advance					
Irina Leonova	Individual	635	34	Lin (TPE) L 140–159	Did not advance					
Yana Tunyantse	Individual	621	46	Hess (NOR) L 153–155	Did not advance					
Anna Mozhar Irina Leonova Yana Tunyantse	Team	1909	7	—N/a		United States W 235–226	Turkey L 247–226	Did not advance		

== Athletics ==
Men's 100 metres

- Vitaliy Savin
- Vitaly Medvedev

Men's 20 km Walk

- Valeriy Borisov

Men's 50 km Walk

- Sergey Korepanov – 3:48:42 (→ 8th place)

Men's Pole Vault

- Igor Potapovich

Men's Triple Jump

- Sergey Arzamasov

Men's Shot Put

- Sergey Rubtsov

Women's 100 metres

- Nataliya Vorobyova

- Heat - 11.91 (→ did not advance)

Women's 400 metres

- Svetlana Bodritskaya

- Heat – 53.24 (→ did not advance)

Women's 400m Hurdles

- Natalya Torshina

- Qualification – 55.94 (→ did not advance)

Women's Long Jump

- Yelena Pershina

- Qualification – 6.50m (→ did not advance)

- Yelena Koshcheyeva

- Qualification – 5.55m (→ did not advance)

Women's High Jump

- Svetlana Zalevskaya

- Qualification – 1.93m
- Final – 1.93m (→ 14th place)

Women's Shot Put

- Yelena Baltabayeva

- Qualification – 16.40m (→ did not advance)

Women's Heptathlon

- Svetlana Kazanina

- Final Result – 6002 points (→ 18th place)

Women's 10 km Walk

- Svetlana Tolstaya – 45:35 (→ 21st place)
- Maya Sazonova – 47:33 (→ 35th place)

== Boxing ==
Men's Flyweight (– 51 kg)

- Bolat Dzhumadilov → Silver Medal
  1. First Round – Defeated Vladislav Neiman (Israel), 18–7
  2. Second Round – Defeated Serhiy Kovganko (Ukraine), 21–4
  3. Quarterfinals – Defeated Damaen Kelly (Ireland), 13–6
  4. Semifinals – Defeated Zoltan Lunka (Germany), 23–18
  5. Final – Lost to Maikro Romero (Cuba), 11–12

Men's Bantamweight (– 54 kg)

- Bektas Abubakirov
  1. First Round – Lost to Rachid Bouaita (France), 4–10

Men's Featherweight (– 57 kg)

- Bakhtiyar Tileganov
  1. First Round – Lost to Floyd Mayweather (United States), referee stopped contest in second round

Men's Light Welterweight (– 63.5 kg)

- Bolat Niyazymbetov → Bronze Medal
  1. First Round – Defeated Carlos Martínez (Mexico), 25–3
  2. Second Round – Defeated Davis Mwale (Zambia), 11–3
  3. Quarterfinals – Defeated Moghimi Babak (Iran), 13–8
  4. Semifinals – Lost to Héctor Vinent (Cuba), 6–23

Men's Welterweight (– 67 kg)

- Nurzhan Smanov
  1. First Round – Defeated Lynden Hosking (Australia), referee stopped contest in second round
  2. Second Round – Defeated Abdul Rasheed Baloch (Pakistan), 13–9
  3. Quarterfinals – Lost to Juan Hernández Sierra (Cuba), 8–16

Men's Light Middleweight (– 71 kg)

- Yermakhan Ibraimov → Bronze Medal
  1. First Round – Defeated Nick Farrell (Canada), 15–4
  2. Second Round – Defeated Hendrik Simangunsong (Indonesia), referee stopped contest in first round
  3. Quarterfinals – Defeated Markus Beyer (Germany), 19–9
  4. Semifinals – Lost to Alfredo Duvergel (Cuba), 19–28

Men's Light Heavyweight (– 81 kg)

- Vassili Jirov → Gold Medal
  1. First Round – Defeated Julio González (Mexico), referee stopped contest in second round
  2. Second Round – Defeated Pietro Aurino (Italy), 18–13
  3. Quarterfinals – Defeated Troy Amos-Ross (Canada), 14–8
  4. Semifinals – Defeated Antonio Tarver (United States), 15–9
  5. Final – Defeated Lee Seung-Bae (South Korea), 17–4

Men's Super Heavyweight (+ 91 kg)

- Mikhail Yurchenko
  1. First Round – Bye
  2. Second Round – Lost to Alexei Lezin (Russia), referee stopped contest in first round

== Cycling ==
=== Road competition ===
Men's Individual Road Race

- Andrey Kivilev
- Alexander Vinokourov
- Aleksandr Shefer
- Andrey Teteryuk

Women's Individual Road Race

- Alla Vasilenko

- Final – did not finish (→ no ranking)

=== Track competition ===
Men's Points Race

- Sergey Lavrenenko

- Final – 7 points (→ 10th place)

Men's Individual Pursuit (4,000 metres)

- Vadim Kravchenko

Women's Points Race

- Alla Vasilenko

== Diving ==
Women's 3m Springboard

- Irina Vyguzova

- Preliminary Heat – 276.45
- Semi Final – 202.86
- Final – 273.06 (→ 10th place)

- Yelena Ivanova

- Preliminary Heat – 235.50
- Semi Final – 187.20 (→ did not advance, 18th place)

Women's 10m Platform

- Irina Vyguzova

- Preliminary Heat – 319.11
- Semi Final – 158.40
- Final – 274.20 (→ 7th place)

== Fencing ==
One male fencer represented Kazakhstan in 1996.

Men

Athlete	Event	Round of 64	Round of 32	Round of 16	Quarterfinal	Semifinal	Final / BM	
Athlete	Event	Opposition Score	Opposition Score	Opposition Score	Opposition Score	Opposition Score	Opposition Score	Rank
Vyacheslav Grigoryev	Foil	Bye	Omnès (FRA); L 4–15	Did not advance				

== Judo ==
Men's Half-Lightweight

- Sergey Akhirov

Men's Lightweight

- Akhat Akhirov

Men's Half-Middleweight

- Ruslan Seilkhanov

Men's Middleweight

- Sergey Alimzhanov

Men's Half-Heavyweight

- Sergey Shakimov

Men's Heavyweight

- Igor Peshkov

Women's Half-Middleweight

- Valentina Kamsulyeva

Women's Half-Heavyweight

- Yevgeniya Bogunova

== Modern pentathlon ==
Men's Individual Competition:

- Alexandre Paryguin – 5551 pts (→ Gold Medal)
- Dmitriy Tyurin – 3878 pts (→ 31st place)

== Shooting ==
Men's Rapid-Fire Pistol (25 metres)

- Vladimir Vokhmyanin

Men's Air Rifle (10 metres)

- Sergey Belyayev

Men's Small-Bore Rifle, Three Positions (50 metres)

- Sergey Belyayev

Men's Small-Bore Rifle Prone (50 metres)

- Sergey Belyayev

Men's Running Target (10 metres)

- Yury Rodnov

Women's Air Pistol (10 metres)

- Galina Belyayeva
- Yuliya Bondareva

Women's Sporting Pistol (25 metres)

- Yuliya Bondareva
- Galina Belyayeva

== Swimming ==
Men

Athlete	Event	Heat		Final	
Athlete	Event	Time	Rank	Time	Rank
Sergey Borisenko	50 m freestyle	23.29	26	Did not advance	
Aleksey Yegorov	100 m freestyle	50.49	21	Did not advance	
Aleksey Yegorov	200 m freestyle	1:51.66	22	Did not advance	
Sergey Ushkalov	100 m backstroke	58.41	41	Did not advance	
Aleksandr Savitsky	100 m breaststroke	1:05.85	38	Did not advance	
Andrey Gavrilov	100 m butterfly	54.56	21	Did not advance	
Aleksandr Savitsky	200 m individual medley	2:08.78	231	Did not advance	
Sergey Borisenko; Aleksey Khovrin; Sergey Ushkalov; Aleksey Yegorov	4 × 100 m freestyle relay	DSQ		Did not advance	
Sergey Ushkalov; Aleksandr Savitsky; Andrey Gavrilov; Aleksey Yegorov	4 × 100 m medley relay	3:49.51	15	Did not advance	

Women

Athlete	Event	Heat		Final	
Athlete	Event	Time	Rank	Time	Rank
Yevgeniya Yermakova	50 m freestyle	21.91	12 FB	26.06	13

== Wrestling ==
Men's Light-Heavyweight

- Rishat Mansurov

- Final – 155.0 + 182.5 = 337.5 (→ 10th place)

- Kuanysh Rymkulov

- Final – DNS (→ no ranking)

== Notes ==
- Watkins, Ginger T., ed. (1997). The Official Report of the Centennial Olympic Games, Volume III The Competition Results (PDF). Atlanta: Peachtree Publishers. ISBN 1-56145-150-9. Archived from the original (PDF) on 2007-09-27.
- "Olympic Medal Winners". International Olympic Committee.
