= Indonesia at the 1996 Summer Olympics =

- IOC code: INA
- NOC: Indonesian Olympic Committee
- Website: www.nocindonesia.or.id (in Indonesian)

in Atlanta
- Competitors: 40 (23 men and 17 women) in 11 sports
- Flag bearer: Hendrik Simangunsong
- Medals Ranked 41st: Gold 1 Silver 1 Bronze 2 Total 4

Summer Olympics appearances (overview)
- 1952; 1956; 1960; 1964; 1968; 1972; 1976; 1980; 1984; 1988; 1992; 1996; 2000; 2004; 2008; 2012; 2016; 2020; 2024

Other related appearances
- Individual Olympic Athletes (2000); Timor-Leste (2004–pres.)

Indonesia competed at the 1996 Summer Olympics in Atlanta, United States.

== Medalists ==
Medal	Name	Sport	Event	Date
Gold	Rexy Mainaky; Ricky Subagja	Badminton	Men's doubles	1 August
Silver	Mia Audina	Badminton	Women's singles	1 August
Bronze	Susi Susanti	Badminton	Women's singles	1 August
Bronze	Antonius Ariantho; Denny Kantono	Badminton	Men's doubles	1 August

Medals by sport
Sport	1st place, gold medalist(s)	2nd place, silver medalist(s)	3rd place, bronze medalist(s)	Total
Badminton	1	1	2	4
Total	1	1	2	4

Medals by gender
Gender	1st place, gold medalist(s)	2nd place, silver medalist(s)	3rd place, bronze medalist(s)	Total
Female	0	1	1	2
Male	1	0	1	2
Mixed	0	0	0	0
Total	1	1	2	4

Medals by date
Date	1st place, gold medalist(s)	2nd place, silver medalist(s)	3rd place, bronze medalist(s)	Total
1 August	1	1	2	4
Total	1	1	2	4

== Competitors ==
The following is the list of number of competitors participating in the Games:

Sport	Men	Women	Total
Archery	0	3	3
Athletics	1	0	1
Badminton	11	9	20
Boxing	4	0	4
Judo	1	0	1
Sailing	1	0	1
Swimming	1	0	1
Table tennis	1	1	2
Tennis	0	2	2
Volleyball	2	2	4
Weightlifting	1	0	1
Total	23	17	40

== Archery ==
Indonesia's archers had only one victory in the archery competition. Nurfitriyana Lantang advanced to the second round before being defeated.

Athlete	Event	Ranking round		Round of 64	Round of 32	Round of 16	Quarterfinals	Semifinals	Final / BM	
Athlete	Event	Score	Seed	Opposition Score	Opposition Score	Opposition Score	Opposition Score	Opposition Score	Opposition Score	Rank
Nurfitriyana Lantang	Women's individual	600	55	Mozhar (KAZ); W 155–153	Mensing (GER); L 141–144	Did not advance				
Danahuri Dahliana	Women's individual	615	51	Aldegani (ITA); L 153–157	Did not advance					
Hamdiah Damanhuri	Women's individual	639	25	Bonal (FRA); L 151–156	Did not advance					
Nurfitriyana Saiman; Danahuri Dahliana; Hamdiah Damanhuri	Women's team	3797	12	—N/a	—N/a	Ukraine; L 208–246	Did not advance			

== Athletics ==
Key

- Note–Ranks given for track events are within the athlete's heat only
- Q = Qualified for the next round
- q = Qualified for the next round as a fastest loser or, in field events, by position without achieving the qualifying target
- NR = National record
- N/A = Round not applicable for the event
- Bye = Athlete not required to compete in round

Men's Track
Athlete	Event	Final	
Athlete	Event	Result	Rank
Ethel Hudzon	Men's marathon	2:26:02	72

== Badminton ==
Men

Athlete	Event	Round of 64	Round of 32	Round of 16	Quarterfinal	Semifinal	Final / BM	
Athlete	Event	Opposition Score	Opposition Score	Opposition Score	Opposition Score	Opposition Score	Opposition Score	Rank
Joko Suprianto	Singles	Bye	Jantti (FIN); W 15–1, 15–5	Olsson (SWE); W 15–11, 15–12	Sidek (MAS); L 5–15, 12–15	Did not advance		
Heryanto Arbi	Singles	Bye	Bhattacharjee (IND); W 15–5, 15–4	Liu (TPE); W 15–0, 15–7	Lee (KOR); W 15–0, 15–13	Høyer (DEN); L 11–15, 6–15	Sidek (MAS); W 15–5, 11–15, 6–15	4th
Alan Budikusuma	Singles	Bye	Johansson (SWE); W 15–5, 15–1	Sun (CHN); W 15–5, 15–6	Høyer (DEN); L 5–15, 6–15	Did not advance		
Rexy Mainaky; Ricky Subagja	Doubles	—N/a	Bye	Søgaard / Svarrer (DEN); W 15–10, 15–7	Huang / Jiang (CHN); W 15–7, 15–7	Soo / Tan (MAS); W 15–3, 15–5	Cheah / Yap (MAS); W 5–15, 15–13, 15–12	1st place, gold medalist(s)
Rudy Gunawan; Bambang Suprianto	Doubles	—N/a	Bye	Soo / Tan (MAS); L 13–18, 15–4, 6–15	Did not advance			
Antonius Ariantho; Denny Kantono	Doubles	—N/a	Bye	Eriksen / Jakobsen (DEN); W 15–8, 15–12	Antropov / Zuyev (RUS); W 15–5, 15–1	Cheah / Yap (MAS); L 10–15, 4–15	Soo / Tan (MAS); W 15–4, 12–15, 15–8	3rd place, bronze medalist(s)

Women

Athlete	Event	Round of 64	Round of 32	Round of 16	Quarterfinal	Semifinal	Final / BM	
Athlete	Event	Opposition Score	Opposition Score	Opposition Score	Opposition Score	Opposition Score	Opposition Score	Rank
Susi Susanti	Singles	Bye	Piche (CAN); W 11–1, 11–3	Krasowska (POL); W 11–4, 11–0	Han (CHN); W 3–11, 11–4, 11–8	Bang (KOR); L 9–11, 8–11	Kim (KOR); W 11–4, 11–1	3rd place, bronze medalist(s)
Mia Audina	Singles	Bye	Magnusson (SWE); W 11–6, 11–1	Morgan (GBR); W 11–2, 4–11, 12–9	Martin (DEN); W 11–6, 8–11, 11–5	Kim (KOR); W 11–6, 9–11, 11–1	Bang (KOR); L 6–11, 7–11	2nd place, silver medalist(s)
Yuliani Sentosa	Singles	Chernyavskaya (BLR); W 6–11, 11–3, 15–13	Sondergaard (DEN); W 11–1, 11–3	Yao (CHN); L 6–11, 5–11	Did not advance			
Finarsih; Lili Tampi	Doubles	—N/a	Cator / Hardy (AUS); W 15–9, 15–4	Qin / Tang (CHN); L 1–15, 15–4, 6–15	Did not advance			
Eliza Nathanael; Zelin Resiana	Doubles	—N/a	Bengtsson / Borg (SWE); W 15–6, 15–13	Jenkins / Robertson (NZL); W 15–9, 15–2	Ge / Gu (CHN); L 7–15, 3–15	Did not advance		

Mixed

Athlete	Event	Round of 64	Round of 32	Round of 16	Quarterfinal	Semifinal	Final / BM	
Athlete	Event	Opposition Score	Opposition Score	Opposition Score	Opposition Score	Opposition Score	Opposition Score	Rank
Tri Kusharjanto; Minarti Timur	Doubles	—N/a	Zuyev / Yakusheva (RUS); W 15–6, 15–6	Antonsson / Crabo (SWE); W 15–5, 18–13	Kim / Gil (KOR); L 4–15, 13–15	Did not advance		
Flandy Limpele; Rosalina Riseu	Doubles	—N/a	Archer / Bradbury (GBR); W 15–5, 15–6	Eriksen / Kirkegaard (DEN); W 10–15, 15–9, 15–9	Liu / Sun (CHN); L 2–15, 15–5, 7–15	Did not advance		

== Boxing ==
Athlete	Event	Round of 32	Round of 16	Quarterfinals	Semifinals	Final	
Athlete	Event	Opposition Result	Opposition Result	Opposition Result	Opposition Result	Opposition Result	Rank
La Paene Masara	Light flyweight	Baláž (SVK); W 13-3	Martínez (MEX); W 8-1	Lozano (ESP); L 9-10	Did not advance		
Hermensen Ballo	Flyweight	Boulingui (GAB); W 6-2	Lunka (GER); L 12-18	Did not advance			
Nemo Bahari	Featherweight	de Brito (BRA); L 3-12	Did not advance				
Hendrik Simangunsong	Light middleweight	Kwangwari (ZIM); W 12-1	Ibraimov (KAZ); L RSC-1	Did not advance			

== Judo ==
Athlete	Event	Round of 32	Round of 16	Quarterfinals	Semifinals	Final	
Athlete	Event	Opposition Result	Opposition Result	Opposition Result	Opposition Result	Opposition Result	Rank
Krisna Bayu	Men's Middleweight	Villar (ESP); L	Did not advance				

== Sailing ==
Men

Athlete	Event	Race									Net points	Final rank
Athlete	Event	1	2	3	4	5	6	7	8	9	Net points	Final rank
I Gusti Made Oka Sulaksana	Men's Mistral	21	7	15	9	13	18	(47)	14	5	149	13th

== Swimming ==
Athlete	Event	Heat		
Athlete	Event	Time	Rank	Note
Richard Sam Bera	Men's 50 metre freestyle	23.80	6 (Heat 5)	Did not advance
Richard Sam Bera	Men's 100 metre freestyle	51.25	8 (Heat 6)	Did not advance

== Table tennis ==
Men

Athlete	Event	Group Stage				Round of 16	Quarterfinal	Semifinal	Final	
Athlete	Event	Opposition Result	Opposition Result	Opposition Result	Rank	Opposition Result	Opposition Result	Opposition Result	Opposition Result	Rank
Anton Suseno	Singles	Grubba (POL); L 0–2	Matsushita (JPN); L 0–2	Ng (CAN); W 2–0	3	Did not advance				

Women

Athlete	Event	Group Stage				Round of 16	Quarterfinal	Semifinal	Final	
Athlete	Event	Opposition Result	Opposition Result	Opposition Result	Rank	Opposition Result	Opposition Result	Opposition Result	Opposition Result	Rank
Rossy Pratiwi Dipoyanti	Singles	Bátorfi (HUN); L 0–2	Abbate-Bulatova (ITA); L 0–2	Zhou (AUS); L 0–2	4	Did not advance				

== Tennis ==
Athlete	Event	Round of 64	Round of 32	Round of 16	Quarterfinals	Semifinals	Final / BM	
Athlete	Event	Opposition Score	Opposition Score	Opposition Score	Opposition Score	Opposition Score	Opposition Score	Rank
Yayuk Basuki	Women's singles	Habšudová (SVK); L 3–6, 3–6	Did not advance					
Yayuk Basuki; Romana Tedjakusuma	Women's doubles	—N/a	Cristea / Dragomir (ROU); W w/o	Novotná / Suková (CZE); L 2–6, 3–6	Did not advance			

== Volleyball ==
=== Beach ===
Athlete	Event	First round	Second round	Third round	Fourth round	Elimination					Semifinal	Final / BM	
Athlete	Event	Opposition Result	Opposition Result	Opposition Result	Opposition Result	Opposition Result	Opposition Result	Opposition Result	Opposition Result	Opposition Result	Opposition Result	Opposition Result	Rank
Markoji Markoji; Mohamed Nurmufid	Men's	Bosma / Jiménez (ESP); L 7–15	Did not advance			Martínez / Conde (ARG); L 5–15	Did not advance						
Eta Kaize; Timy Yudhani Rahayu	Women's	Malowney / Broen-Ouelette (CAN); W 15–10	Pires / Silva (BRA); L 2–15	Did not advance		Huerta / Eguiluz (MEX); W 15–5	Fujita / Takahashi (JPN); L 0–15	Did not advance					

== Weightlifting ==
Athlete	Event	Snatch		Clean & Jerk		Total	Rank
Athlete	Event	Result	Rank	Result	Rank	Total	Rank
Hari Setiawan	Flyweight	105	=14	145	=5	250	12

== See also ==
- 1996 Olympic Games
- 1996 Paralympic Games
- Indonesia at the Olympics
- Indonesia at the Paralympics
- Indonesia at the 1996 Summer Paralympics
