= 1996 European Archery Championships =

1996 European Championships
- Location: Kranjska Gora, Slovenia
- Dates: 17-23 June 1996

The 1996 European Archery Championships is the 14th edition of the European Archery Championships. The event was held in Kranjska Gora, Slovenia from 17 to 23 June, 1996.

== Medal table ==
* Host nation (Slovenia)

Rank	Nation	Gold	Silver	Bronze	Total
1	Italy	2	4	1	7
2	Russia	2	0	0	2
2	Sweden	2	0	0	2
4	Turkey	1	0	1	2
5	Great Britain	1	0	0	1
6	Hungary	0	1	1	2
7	Moldova	0	1	0	1
7	Slovenia	0	1	0	1
7	Ukraine	0	1	0	1
10	France	0	0	3	3
11	Netherlands	0	0	2	2
Totals (11 entries)		8	8	8	24

== Medal summary ==
=== Recurve ===
Event	Gold	Silver	Bronze
Men's individual	Russia; Balzynim Cyrempilov	Italy; Ilario Di Buò	France; Damien Letulle
Women's individual	Turkey; Natalia Nasaridze	Moldova; Natalia Valeeva	Turkey; Elif Altınkaynak
Men's team	Russia; Balzynim Cyrempilov; Bair Badënov; Gennadi Mitrofanov	Italy; Matteo Bisiani; Michele Frangilli; Ilario Di Buò	France; Sébastien Flute; Lionel Torrés; Damien Letulle
Women's team	Italy; Giovanna Aldegani; Giuseppina Di Blasi; Paola Fantato	Ukraine; Nataliya Bilukha; Lina Herasymenko; Olena Sadovnycha	Netherlands; Lyudmila Arzhannikova; Sjan van Dijk; Christel Verstegen

=== Compound ===
Event	Gold	Silver	Bronze
Men's individual	United Kingdom; Simon Tarplee	Italy; Antonio Tosco	Hungary; Tibor Ondrik
Women's individual	Sweden; Petra Ericsson	Slovenia; Bernarda Zemljak	Italy; Anna Campagnoli
Men's team	Italy; Mario Ruele; Antonio Tosco; Michele Palumbo	Hungary; Péter Fehér; Tibor Ondrik; János Povázson	France; Stephane Guillard; Gérard Douis; Daniel Schneider
Women's team	Sweden; Petra Ericsson; Ulrika Sjöwall; Pernilla Svensson	Italy; Fabiola Palazzini; Barbara Bettinelli; Anna Campagnoli	Netherlands; Jess Vogels; Marjon Pigney; Annemarie Puts
