= 2002 European Indoor Archery Championships =

2002 European Indoor Championships
- Location: Ankara, Turkey
- Dates: 13–17 March 2002
- Competitors: 40 from 10 nations

The 2002 European Indoor Archery Championships was the 8th edition of the European Indoor Archery Championships. The event was held in Ankara, Turkey from 13 to 17 March 2002.

== Medal table ==
* Host nation (Turkey)

Rank	Nation	Gold	Silver	Bronze	Total
1	Italy	3	2	0	5
2	Ukraine	2	0	1	3
3	France	1	2	1	4
4	Slovenia	1	0	1	2
5	Netherlands	1	0	0	1
6	Spain	0	2	0	2
7	Russia	0	1	1	2
8	Georgia	0	1	0	1
9	Great Britain	0	0	3	3
10	Switzerland	0	0	1	1
Totals (10 entries)		8	8	8	24

== Medal summary ==
=== Recurve ===
Event	Gold	Silver	Bronze
Men's individual	Viktor Ruban; Ukraine	Marco Galiazzo; Italy	Flavier Pothier; France
Women's individual	Natalia Valeeva; Italy	Elena Dostay; Russia	Tetyana Berezhna; Ukraine
Men's team	Italy; Marco Galiazzo; Michele Frangilli; Mario Casavecchia	France; Flavier Pothier; Bérenger Chaillot; Franck Fisseux	United Kingdom; Michael Peart; Neil Bridgewater; Roy Nash
Women's team	Ukraine; Tetyana Berezhna; Olena Sadovnycha; Kateryna Palekha	Georgia; Khatuna Narimanidze; Olga Ladigina; Asmat Diasamidze	Russia; Elena Dostay; Anna Puceva; Sofia Jarkina

=== Compound ===
Event	Gold	Silver	Bronze
Men's individual	Tevž Grögl; Slovenia	Arturo Torrijos; Spain	Simon Frankhauser; Switzerland
Women's individual	Olga Zandvliet; Netherlands	Giorgia Solato; Italy	Nichola Simpson; Great Britain
Men's team	France; Stephane Sauvignon; Eric Verrier; Hervé Dardant	Spain; Arturo Torrijos; José Ignacio Catalán; Antonio González	Slovenia; Tevž Grögl; Štefan Ošep; Dejan Sitar
Women's team	Italy; Giorgia Solato; Biagia Sambataro; Floriana Mattia	France; Valérie Fabre; Catherine Deburck; Maggy Masson	United Kingdom; Nichola Simpson; Linda Garnar; Sheila Harris
