= 1997 World Indoor Archery Championships =

1997 World Indoor Target Archery Championships
- Location: Istanbul, Turkey

The 1997 World Indoor Target Archery Championships were held in istanbul, Turkey.

== Medal summary (Men's individual) ==
Event	Gold	Silver	Bronze
Recurve Men's individual	(South Korea) Chung Jae-hun	(United States) Shane Parker	(France) Sebastian Flute
Compound Men's individual	(United States) Dee Wilde	(Sweden) Morgan Lundin	(Socialist Federal Republic of Yugoslavia) Danilo Miokovic

== Medal summary (Women's individual) ==
Event	Gold	Silver	Bronze
Recurve Women's individual	(Ukraine) Tetyana Muntyan	(South Korea) Hyun-ji Kim	(Turkey) Natalia Nasaridze
Compound Women's individual	(France) Valerie Fabre	(Switzerland) Sylviane Lambelet	(Netherlands) Irma Luyting

== Medal summary (Men's team) ==
Event	Gold	Silver	Bronze
Recurve Men's team	South Korea (KOR); Chung Jae-hun; Lee Dong-Wook; Han Seung-Hoon	Sweden (SWE); Magnus Petersson; Göran Bjerendal; Per-Johan Spång	Italy (ITA); Michele Frangili; Filippo Clini; Matteo Bisiani
Compound Men's team	Sweden (SWE); Morgan Lundin; Henric Nyström; Peter Rasmusson	Denmark (DEN); Tom Henriksen; Niels Baldur; Per Knudsen	Switzerland (SWI); Dominique Giroud; Simon Frankhauser; David Lopez

== Medal summary (Women's team) ==
Event	Gold	Silver	Bronze
Recurve Women's team	Germany (GER); Cornelia Pfohl; Wiebke Nulle; Sandra Wagner	Kazakhstan (KAZ); Iana Tounianis; Irina Leonova; Elena Plotnikova	Ukraine (UKR); Lina Herasymenko; Svitlana Bard; Tetyana Muntyan
Compound Women's team	United States (USA); Theresa Berthold; Glenda Doran; Jamie van Natta	France (FRA); Valerie Fabre; Michele Deloraine; Sophie Cordier	Sweden (SWE); Petra Ericsson; Ulrika Sjöwall; Pernilla Svensson
