= 2002 European Archery Championships =

2002 European Championships
- Location: Oulu, Finland
- Dates: 22-27 July 2002

The 2002 European Archery Championships is the 17th edition of the European Archery Championships. The event was held in Oulu, Finland from 22 to 27 July, 2002.

== Medal table ==
* Host nation (Finland)

Rank	Nation	Gold	Silver	Bronze	Total
1	Italy	3	0	2	5
2	Russia	2	1	0	3
3	Netherlands	1	1	1	3
4	Finland	1	1	0	2
5	France	1	0	3	4
6	Poland	0	1	1	2
7	Germany	0	1	0	1
7	Slovenia	0	1	0	1
7	Sweden	0	1	0	1
7	Turkey	0	1	0	1
11	Ukraine	0	0	1	1
Totals (11 entries)		8	8	8	24

== Medal summary ==
=== Recurve ===
Event	Gold	Silver	Bronze
Men's individual	Italy; Michele Frangilli	Russia; Balzynim Cyrempilov	Italy; Ilario Di Buò
Women's individual	Italy; Natalia Valeeva	Turkey; Derya Uraz	Poland; Justyna Mospinek
Men's team	France; Jocelyn de Grandis; Olivier Tavernier; Willy Ardiet	Netherlands; Wietse van Alten; Ron van der Hoff; Pieter Custers	Italy; Michele Frangilli; Marco Galiazzo; Ilario Di Buò
Women's team	Russia; Margarita Galinovskaya; Elena Dostay; Natalia Bolotova	Poland; Justyna Mospinek; Iwona Marcinkiewicz; Wioletta Myszor	Ukraine; Kateryna Serdyuk; Olena Sadovnycha; Kateryna Palekha

=== Compound ===
Event	Gold	Silver	Bronze
Men's individual	Italy; Michele Palumbo	Sweden; Björn Andersson	Netherlands; Fred van Zutphen
Women's individual	Finland; Anna-Liisa Tuuttu	Germany; Petra Dortmund	France; Catherine Pellen
Men's team	Netherlands; Guido van den Bosch; Fred van Zutphen; Peter Elzinga	Slovenia; Tomaz Hodnik; Rajko Usai; Dejan Sitar; Tevz Grogl	France; Jean-Marc Beaud; Claude Brunstein; Denis Vanez; Stephane Sauvignan
Women's team	Russia; Sofia Goncharova; Anna Bologova; Natalia Bolotova	Finland; Anna-Liisa Tuuttu; Anne Laurila; Sirkka Sokka-Matikainen; Anne Sjöroos	France; Valérie Fabre; Catherine Pellen; Sandrine Vandionant; Catherine Deburck
