= Lindsay Langston =

American archer (born 1979)

Personal information
- Born: 1979 (age 45–46); Modesto, California, United States
- Height: 5.5 ft (1.7 m)
- Weight: 115 lb (52 kg)

Sport
- Sport: Archery

Lindsay Langston (born 1979) is an American archer. She competed in the women's individual and team events at the 1996 Summer Olympics.

== Early life and education ==
Born in Modesto, California, Langston first became interested in archery by watching her father participate in tournaments, and he gifted her a bow for her ninth birthday after recognizing her talent. She would practice archery in her back yard and would get pointers from her father and coach. She had other interests including pool and play writing and had considered quitting archery because of the struggle to keep up with school work, due to competition commitments. Her father coached her from the age of 9 and praised her confidence which he believed was key to her achieving success. She came from a family of archers, with many males on her father's side being involved in the sport, although noted her brother preferred "faster-paced sports". When offered the choice by her mother between piano and archery, she chose the latter and reasoned that "it's all on yourself. You don't have to pass something to somebody and hope they catch it". Her family moved to Albuquerque in 1990.

Langston attended Eisenhower Middle School during the early 1990s, La Cueva High School around 1993 and Eldorado High School around 1995. Outside of archery, she was also interested in film and expected her interest in archery to "diminish" as she got older. In 1998, she attended Mountain View High School where she was a member of the student council. She expressed a hope in 1995 of attending the University of California, Los Angeles when the time was right due to them being "the only school that offers scholarships for archery".

== Career ==
=== 1989-1994: Beginnings and first Olympics ===
Langston's first competition was in 1989, when at the age of 11 she competed in the under-13s California outdoor championship, breaking two records that had stood for a decade. In the same year, she finished third in the Nationals for her age group in Columbus, Ohio.

In 1992, she was the national junior outdoor archery champion. She also competed in the United States archery trials for the 1992 Summer Olympics. In July 1993, she participated in an international tournament in Cannes, France with the Junior World U.S. team and she was sponsored by the United States Olympic Committee and the National Archery Association. During the early to mid 1990s, the sport took her to competitions in countries such as Germany, Mexico and France. Towards the end of 1994 in Salt Lake City, she became the youngest archery team member of the 1995 United States World Indoor Championships, by a difference of five years in age. During the 1994 Junior World Target Championships held in Italy, despite being eliminated in the quarter-finals, she placed in the top 16 worldwide and finished eighth for the United States in the World Championship qualifications. Her achievements saw her receive a special recognition award from the Albuquerque Sports Hall of Fame.

=== 1995-1997: Second Olympics ===
In 1995, she finished first in the United States World Championship Trials, earning a trip to England, although had to withdraw due to family problems. Her family concerns meant that she stopped competing entirely for around three months and withdrew from school "due to personal concerns". Speaking in July 1995, Langston said that there was "too much pressure" in trying to live up to expectations and noted that she chose to leave the sport as she stopped finding it fun, although did not rule out a return to try and make the 1996 Olympic team. After five years living in Albuquerque, the family moved back to Mesa, Arizona in 1995.

Following her break from the sport, which she accepted as being just what was needed, she returned to win the United States Olympic trials at the age of 17, twenty years younger than the closest in age teammate, Janet Dykman. She expressed in February 1996 that the favorite part of being a champion of archery was being among other members of the United States team at international tournaments. Approaching the 1996 Summer Olympics, Langston was the youngest of a 16-member Olympic training team from the United States. While training, her coach would try and use visualizations in practice, such as visualizing an arrow representing a gold medal, but she conceded that the approach "wasn't for me", instead preferring to "relax and enjoy archery". When in the Olympic village, she expressed her shock as meeting the President Bill Clinton and shaking his hand. Prior to attending the Olympics, she competed in the 1996 Championships of the Americas competition held in Colorado Springs for the recurve bracket and placed second overall, losing 108–97 to Marisol Bretón of Mexico. During the Olympic competition in July and August 1996, she passed the first round of individual competitions, but lost in the second, ultimately being ranked 21st as an individual out of all competitors.

Following the Olympics, she planned to compete at the World Outdoor Championships in Victoria, British Columbia in the fall of 1997. As a part of a three-person team for the 1997 Moscow Grand Prix Archery Tournament, Langston placed 44th individually and the team 8th overall.

== Personal life ==
Her father Harry Langston was also an archer and she was born into a family of male archers. She noted that her idol was Denise Parker, who was an Olympic bronze medalist in 1988 at the age of 14.
