= Sjöwall =

Sjöwall (Swedish pronunciation: [ˈɧø̂ːval]) or Sjövall is a Swedish surname. Notable people with the surname include:

- Jenny Sjöwall (born 1971), Swedish archer
- Maj Sjöwall (1935–2020), Swedish author and translator
- Maj Sjöwall (1935–2020), Swedish author and translator
- Ulrika Sjöwall (born 1971), Swedish archer
