= Moldova at the 1996 Summer Olympics =

- IOC code: MDA
- NOC: National Olympic Committee of the Republic of Moldova
- Website: www.olympic.md (in Romanian)

in Atlanta
- Competitors: 40 (35 men and 5 women) in 10 sports
- Flag bearer: Vadim Vacarciuc
- Medals Ranked 58th: Gold 0 Silver 1 Bronze 1 Total 2

Summer Olympics appearances (overview)
- 1996; 2000; 2004; 2008; 2012; 2016; 2020; 2024

Other related appearances
- Russian Empire (1900–1912); Romania (1924–1936); Soviet Union (1952–1988); Unified Team (1992)

Moldova competed in the Summer Olympic Games as an independent nation for the first time at the 1996 Summer Olympics in Atlanta, United States. Previously, Moldovan athletes competed for the Unified Team at the 1992 Summer Olympics.

== Medalists ==
=== Silver ===
- Viktor Reneysky and Nicolae Juravschi — Canoeing, Men's C2 500 metres Canadian Pairs

=== Bronze ===
- Sergei Mureiko — Wrestling, Men's Greco-Roman Super Heavyweight (> 100 kg)

== Results by event ==
=== Archery ===
In Moldova's debut independent archery competition, veteran and defending bronze medallist Natalia Valeeva was defeated in the third round of competition.

Women's Individual Competition:

- Natalia Valeeva → Round of 16, 12th place (2-1)
- Nadejda Palovandova → Round of 64, 38th place (0-1)

=== Athletics ===
Men's 400m Hurdles

- Vadim Zadoinov

- Heat — 49.73s (→ did not advance)

Men's Marathon

- Valery Vlas — 2:28.36 (→ 77th place)

Men's 20 km Walk

- Fedosei Ciumacenco — 1:27:57 (→ 41st place)

Men's 50 km Walk

- Fedosei Ciumacenco — did not start (→ no ranking)

Women's High Jump

- Olga Bolşova

- Qualification — 1.93m
- Final — 1.93m (→ 12th place)

- Inna Gliznuta

- Qualification — 1.85m (→ did not advance)

=== Boxing ===
Men's Flyweight (51 kg)

- Igor Samoilenco
  1. First Round — Defeated Omar Adorno (Puerto Rico), 20-8
  2. Second Round — Lost to Elias Recaido (Philippines), 8-12

Men's Lightweight (60 kg)

- Octavian Țîcu
  1. First Round — Lost to Tontcho Tontchev (Bulgaria), referee stopped contest in second round

=== Cycling ===
==== Road Competition ====
Men's Individual Time Trial

- Ruslan Ivanov

- Final — 1:10:55 (→ 27th place)

- Igor Bonciukov

- Final — 1:12:48 (→ 33rd place)

=== Swimming ===
Men's 50m Freestyle

- Maxim Kazmirchuk
  1. Heat – 23.78 (→ did not advance, 43rd place)

Men's 100m Butterfly

- Maxim Kazmirchuk
  1. Heat – 56.46 (→ did not advance, 46th place)

Men's 200m Backstroke

- Artur Elizarov
  1. Heat – 2:07.86 (→ did not advance, 33rd place)

Men's 100m Breaststroke

- Vadim Tatarov
  1. Heat – 1:04.87 (→ did not advance, 30th place)

Men's 200m Breaststroke

- Vadim Tatarov
  1. Heat – 2:21.34 (→ did not advance, 28th place)

Men's 200m Individual Medley

- Serghei Mariniuc
  1. Heat – 2:04.99
  2. B-Final – 2:04.11 (→ 13th place)

Men's 400m Individual Medley

- Serghei Mariniuc
  1. Heat – 4:20.24
  2. Final – 4:21.15 (→ 8th place)

=== Weightlifting ===
Men's Light-Heavyweight

- Vadim Vacarciuc

- Final — 165.0 + 202.5 = 367.5 (→ 5th place)

=== Wrestling ===
Men's Freestyle

- Vitalie Railean — Light flyweight, 6th place
- Nazim Alidjanov — Bantamweight, 14th place
- Victor Peicov — Welterweight, 7th place
- Gusman Jabrailov — Middleweight, 9th place

Men's Greco-Roman

- Igor Grabovetchi — Heavyweight, 6th place
- Sergei Mureiko — Super Heavyweight, bronze medal.
