= Maria Kun =

Swedish footballer

Personal information
- Date of birth: 17 April 1973 (age 53)
- Place of birth: Sweden
- Position: Forward

Senior career*
Years	Team	Apps	(Gls)
1996	Gideonsberg IF		

International career
1996	Sweden	10 (?)	
- * Club domestic league appearances and goals

Maria Kun (born 17 April 1973) is a Swedish former football forward who played for the Sweden women's national football team. She competed at the 1996 Summer Olympics, playing three matches. At the club level, she played for Gideonsberg IF.

== See also ==
- Sweden at the 1996 Summer Olympics
