= Nataliya Bilukha =

Ukrainian archer (born 1971)

Personal information
- Nationality: Ukrainian
- Born: 22 January 1971 (age 55) Lviv, Ukrainian SSR, Soviet Union

Sport
- Sport: Archery
Medal record
Women's Archery
Representing Ukraine
World Indoor Championships
Gold medal – first place	1995 Birmingham	Team
European Championships
Silver medal – second place	1996 Kranjska Gora	Team
European Indoor Championships
Silver medal – second place	1996 Mol	Team

Nataliya Bilukha (born 22 January 1971) is a Ukrainian archer. She competed in the women's individual and team events at the 1996 Summer Olympics.
