= Kinue Kodama =

Japanese archer (born 1972)

Personal information
- Nationality: Japanese
- Born: 2 August 1972 (age 52)

Sport
- Sport: Archery

Kinue Kodama (児玉絹枝, Kodama Kinue, born 2 August 1972) is a Japanese archer. She competed in the women's individual and team events at the 1996 Summer Olympics.
