= Jennifer Mbuta =

Kenyan archer (born 1968)

Personal information
- Nationality: Kenyan
- Born: 18 October 1968 (age 56)

Sport
- Sport: Archery

Jennifer Mbuta (born 18 October 1968) is a Kenyan archer. She competed in the women's individual event at the 1996 Summer Olympics.
