= Lin Ya-hua =

Taiwanese archer

Personal information
- Nationality: Taiwanese
- Born: 30 December 1975 (age 49)

Sport
- Sport: Archery

Lin Ya-hua (Chinese: 林雅華; pinyin: Lín Yǎhuá, born 30 December 1975) is a Taiwanese archer. She competed in the women's individual and team events at the 1996 Summer Olympics.
