= Misato Koide =

Japanese archer (born 1978)

Personal information
- Nationality: Japanese
- Born: 23 September 1978 (age 46)

Sport
- Sport: Archery

Misato Koide (小出美沙都, Koide Misato, born 23 September 1978) is a Japanese archer. She competed in the women's individual and team events at the 1996 Summer Olympics.
