= Makhlukhanum Murzayeva =

Russian archer (born 1966)

Personal information
- Nationality: Russian
- Born: 4 October 1966 (age 58); Makhachkala, Russia

Sport
- Sport: Archery

Makhlukhanum Murzayeva (born 4 October 1966) is a Russian archer. She competed in the women's individual and team events at the 1996 Summer Olympics.
