= Tetiana Muntian =

Ukrainian archer

Tetyana Muntyan
Personal information
- Full name: Tetyana / Tatyana Stepanivna Muntyan
- Born: 7 March 1968 (age 58) Chernivtsi, Ukrainian SSR, Soviet Union
- Height: 168 cm (5 ft 6 in)
- Weight: 62 kg (137 lb)

Sport
- Country: Soviet Union, Ukraine, United States of America, United States Virgin Islands
- Sport: Archery
- Event: Recurve
Medal record
Women's archery
World Championships
Representing Soviet Union
Bronze medal – third place	1989 Lausanne	Team
Representing Ukraine
Silver medal – second place	1997 Victoria	Team
World Indoor Championships
Representing Ukraine
Gold medal – first place	1995 Birmingham	Team
Gold medal – first place	1997 Istanbul	Individual
Bronze medal – third place	1997 Istanbul	Team
European Championships
Representing Soviet Union
Gold medal – first place	1988 Luxembourg	Team
Pan American Masters Championships
Representing United States Virgin Islands
Bronze medal – third place	2022 Halifax	Individual, Mixed Team
Gold medal – first place	2024 San Salvador	Individual
Silver medal – second place	2024 San Salvador	Mixed Team
Silver medal – second place	2026 Medellin	Individual
Bronze medal – third place	2026 Medellin	Mixed Team
Pan American Masters Games
Representing United States Virgin Islands
Gold medal – first place	2024 Cleveland	Individual
Caribbean Championships
Representing United States Virgin Islands
Gold medal – first place	2026 Georgetown	Individual, Women’s Doubles, Mixed Team

Tetiana / Tetyana / Tatyana Stepanivna Muntyan (Ukrainian: Тетяна Степанівна Мунтян; born 7 March 1968) is a former Soviet Union and Ukrainian archer from Ukraine who competed at the 1988 Summer Olympics in individual and team events. She later competed for the United States of America (under her modified first name, "Tatyana") but now competes for the United States Virgin Islands. At the 2024 Pan American Masters Championships in San Salvador, she and her fellow Virgin Islander, Bruce Arnold, set a world record in mixed-team qualifications with a score of 1228. At the same tournament Muntyan also set a Pan American qualification record with her score of 656.
