= Lina Herasymenko =

Ukrainian archer (born 1974)

Personal information
- Full name: Lina Serhiyivna Herasymenko
- Born: 29 September 1974 (age 51) Chernivtsi, Ukrainian SSR, Soviet Union

Sport
- Country: Ukraine
- Sport: Archery
- Event: Recurve
Medal record
Women's archery
Representing Ukraine
World Championships
Silver medal – second place	1997 Victoria	Team
European Championships
Gold medal – first place	1998 Boé/Agen	Individual
Silver medal – second place	1996 Kranjska Gora	Team
World Indoor Championships
Gold medal – first place	1995 Birmingham	Team
Silver medal – second place	1997 Istanbul	Team
European Indoor Championships
Silver medal – second place	1996 Mol	Team
- Updated on 19 August 2017

Lina Serhiyivna Herasymenko (Ukrainian: Ліна Сергіївна Герасименко; born 29 September 1974) is a Ukrainian archer. She competed at the 1996 Summer Olympics in Atlanta, where she placed 23rd in the individual contest, and fifth in the team contest. At those Games she also set the Olympic record in 72 arrow ranking round (673) which lasted until July 23, 2021, when it was beaten in the qualification round by the South Korean archer An San (680).
