= Myfanwy Matthews =

Australian archer (born 1975)

Myfanwy Ann Matthews (born 29 December 1975 in Dubbo, New South Wales), is a former Australian athlete who competed in archery.

At the Australian national indoor championships held in Canberra in 1993, Matthews was second in the recurve event. The following year she won the recurve event at the ACT archery championships. She competed at the 1995 world archery championship in Jakarta in the lead-up to the 1996 Olympics.

Matthews represented Australia at the 1996 Atlanta Olympics in the individual archery event, finishing in 48th.
