= María Reyes (archer) =

Puerto Rican archer (born 1964)

Personal information
- Nationality: Puerto Rican
- Born: 29 June 1964 (age 62)

Sport
- Sport: Archery
Medal record
Representing Puerto Rico
Pan American Games
Bronze medal – third place	1995 Mar del Plata	30m recurve
Central American and Caribbean Games
Bronze medal – third place	1993 Ponce	30m recurve
Bronze medal – third place	1993 Ponce	Recurve team

María Reyes (born 29 June 1964) is a Puerto Rican archer. She competed in the women's individual event at the 1996 Summer Olympics, coming in 64th. Later, she became a trainer of the national archery team of Puerto Rico.
