= Olga Yakusheva =

Belarusian archer (born 1974)

Personal information
- Nationality: Belarusian
- Born: 7 October 1974 (age 50); Vitebsk, Byelorussian SSR, USSR

Sport
- Sport: Archery

Olga Yakusheva (born 7 October 1974) is a Belarusian archer. She competed in the women's individual event at the 1996 Summer Olympics.
