= Sweden at the 1996 Summer Olympics =

- IOC code: SWE
- NOC: Swedish Olympic Committee
- Website: www.sok.se (in Swedish and English)

in Atlanta
- Competitors: 177 (111 men and 66 women) in 22 sports
- Flag bearer: Jan-Ove Waldner
- Medals Ranked 29th: Gold 2 Silver 4 Bronze 2 Total 8

Summer Olympics appearances (overview)
- 1896; 1900; 1904; 1908; 1912; 1920; 1924; 1928; 1932; 1936; 1948; 1952; 1956; 1960; 1964; 1968; 1972; 1976; 1980; 1984; 1988; 1992; 1996; 2000; 2004; 2008; 2012; 2016; 2020; 2024

Other related appearances
- 1906 Intercalated Games

Sweden competed at the 1996 Summer Olympics in Atlanta, United States. 177 competitors, 111 men and 66 women, took part in 109 events in 22 sports.

== Medalists ==
Medal	Name	Sport	Event
Gold	Ludmila Engquist	Athletics	Women's 100 m hurdles
Gold	Susanne Gunnarsson; Agneta Andersson	Canoeing	Women's K-2 500 m
Silver	Bobby Lohse; Hans Wallén	Sailing	Star
Silver	Magnus Petersson	Archery	Men's individual
Silver	Lars Frölander; Anders Holmertz; Anders Lyrbring; Christer Wallin	Swimming	Men's 4 × 200 m freestyle relay
Silver	Sweden men's national handball team: Magnus Andersson; Robert Andersson; Per Carlén; Martin Frändesjö; Erik Hajas; Robert Hedin; Andreas Larsson; Ola Lindgren; Stefan Lövgren; Mats Olsson; Staffan Olsson; Johan Petersson; Tomas Svensson; Tomas Sivertsson; Pierre Thorsson; Magnus Wislander	Handball	Men's tournament
Bronze	Agneta Andersson; Ingela Ericsson; Anna Olsson; Susanne Rosenqvist	Canoeing	Women's K-4 500 m
Bronze	Mikael Ljungberg	Wrestling	Men's greco-Roman 100 kg

== Archery ==
Swedish men returned to Olympic archery with a silver medal performance by Magnus Petersson. Veteran Göran Bjerendal was defeated in the first round.

Women's Individual Competition:

- Jenny Sjöwall → Round of 32, 26th place (1-1)
- Christa Backman → Round of 64, 35th place (0-1)
- Kristina Persson-Nordlander → Round of 64, 43rd place (0-1)

Men's Individual Competition:

- Magnus Petersson → Final, Silver Medal (5-1)
- Mikael Larsson → Round of 32, 21st place (1-1)
- Göran Bjerendal → Round of 64, 34th place (0-1)

Women's Team Competition:

- Sjöwall, Backman, and Persson → Quarterfinal, 7th place (1-1)

Men's Team Competition:

- Petersson, Larsson, and Bjerendal → Quarterfinal, 6th place (1-1)

== Athletics ==
Men's 400m Hurdles

- Sven Nylander

- Heat — 49.54s
- Semi Final — 48.21s
- Final — 47.98s (→ 4th place)

Men's Marathon

- Anders Szalkai — 2:24.27 (→ 64th place)

Men's Javelin Throw

- Dag Wennlund

- Qualification — 75.24m (→ did not advance)

Men's Hammer Throw

- Tore Gustafsson

- Qualification — 71.02m (→ did not advance)

Women's High Jump

- Kajsa Bergqvist

- Qualification — 1.90m (→ did not advance)

== Badminton ==
Jan-Eric Antonsson, Peter Axelsson, Catrine Bengtsson, Maria Bengtsson, Margit Borg, Astrid Crabo, Tomas Johansson, Pär-Gunnar Jönsson, Christine Magnusson, Jens Olsson

== Beach Volleyball ==
- Tom Englen and Fredrik Petersson — 17th place overall

== Boxing ==
Men's Light Flyweight (48 kg)

- Stefan Ström

- First Round — Lost to Yosvani Aguilera (Cuba), referee stopped contest in second round

Men's Bantamweight (54 kg)

- John Larbi

- First Round — Lost to Arnaldo Mesa (Cuba), 5-19

Men's Light Middleweight (71 kg)

- Roger Pettersson

- First Round — Defeated Shokhrat Kourbanov (Turkmenistan), 7-2
- Second Round — Lost to Antonio Perugino (Italy), 4-18

Men's Light Heavyweight (81 kg)

- Ismael Koné

- First Round — Defeated Ilkham Kerimov (Azerbaijan), 22-3
- Second Round — Lost to Thomas Ulrich (Germany), 9-24

Men's Heavyweight (91 kg)

- Kwamena Turkson

- First Round — Defeated Young-Sam Ko (South Korea), 12-8
- Second Round — Lost to Félix Savón (Cuba), knock-out in first round

Men's Super Heavyweight (> 91 kg)

- Attila Levin

- First Round — Bye
- Second Round — Defeated Jean-François Bergeron (Canada), referee stopped contest in first round
- Quarterfinals — Lost to Wladimir Klitschko (Ukraine), referee stopped contest in first round

== Cycling ==
=== Road Competition ===
Men's Individual Time Trial

- Jan Karlsson

- Final — 1:08:52 (→ 18th place)

- Michael Andersson

- Final — did not finish (→ no ranking)

Women's Individual Road Race

- Susanne Ljungskog

- Final — 02:37:06 (→ 25th place)

=== Mountain Bike ===
Men's Cross Country

- Roger Persson

- Final — 2:37:17 (→ 21st place)

== Diving ==
Men's 3m Springboard

- Jimmy Sjödin

- Preliminary Heat — 339.93 (→ did not advance, 20th place)

- Joakim Andersson

- Preliminary Heat — 331.83 (→ did not advance, 22nd place)

Women's 3m Springboard

- Anna Lindberg

- Preliminary Heat — 292.02
- Semi Final — 220.29
- Final — 269.52 (→ 8th place)

== Fencing ==
Two fencers, one man and one woman, represented Sweden in 1996.

Men's épée

- Péter Vánky

Women's épée

- Helena Elinder

== Football ==
Summary

Key:

- W – Win D – Draw L – Loss
- A.E.T – After extra time.
- P – Match decided by penalty-shootout.

Team	Event	Group Stage				Quarterfinal	Semifinal	Final / BM	
Team	Event	Opposition Score	Opposition Score	Opposition Score	Rank	Opposition Score	Opposition Score	Opposition Score	Rank
Sweden women's	Women's tournament	China; L 0–2	United States; L 1–2	Denmark; W 3–1	3	—N/a	Did not qualify		6

=== Women's tournament ===
- Annelie Nilsson
- Cecilia Sandell
- Åsa Jakobsson
- Annika Nessvold
- Kristin Bengtsson
- Anna Pohjanen
- Pia Sundhage
- Malin Swedberg
- Malin Andersson
- Ulrika Kalte
- Lena Videkull
- Ulrika Karlsson
- Camilla Svensson
- Maria Kun
- Julia Carlsson
- Hanna Ljungberg

== Handball ==
Summary

Key:

- ET: After extra time
- P – Match decided by penalty-shootout.

Team	Event	Group Stage						Semifinal	Final / BM / Pl.	
Team	Event	Opposition Score	Opposition Score	Opposition Score	Opposition Score	Opposition Score	Rank	Opposition Score	Opposition Score	Rank
Sweden men's	Men's tournament	United States; W 23–19	Switzerland; W 26–19	Russia; W 22–20	Kuwait; W 33–18	Croatia; W 27–18	1 Q	Spain; W 25–20	Croatia; L 26–27	2nd place, silver medalist(s)

== Modern pentathlon ==
Men's Individual Competition:

- Per-Olov Danielson — 5375 pts (→ 10th place)

== Swimming ==
Men's 50 m Freestyle

- Pär Lindström

- Heat — 23.47 (→ did not advance, 33rd place)

Men's 100 m Freestyle

- Lars Frölander

- Heat — 49.91
- Final — scratched

Men's 200 m Freestyle

- Anders Holmertz

- Heat — 1:48.41
- Final — 1:48.42 (→ 5th place)

Men's 400 m Freestyle

- Anders Holmertz

- Heat — 3:52.27
- Final — 3:50.66 (→ 5th place)

Men's 100 m Butterfly

- Lars Frölander

- Heat — 54.37 (→ did not advance, 19th place)

Men's 4 × 100 m Freestyle Relay

- Fredrik Letzler, Lars Frölander, Christer Wallin, and Johan Wallberg

- Heat — 3:20.74

- Lars Frölander, Fredrik Letzler, Anders Holmertz, and Christer Wallin

- Final — 3:20.16 (→ 7th place)

Men's 4 × 200 m Freestyle Relay

- Christer Wallin, Lars Frölander, Anders Lyrbring, and Anders Holmertz

- Heat — 7:20.61

- Christer Wallin, Anders Holmertz, Lars Frölander, and Anders Lyrbring

- Final — 7:17.56 (→ Silver Medal)

Women's 50 m Freestyle

- Linda Olofsson

- Heat — 25.84
- Final — 25.63 (→ 6th place)

Women's 100 m Freestyle

- Linda Olofsson

- Heat — 56.56
- B-Final — 55.83 (→ 10th place)

Women's 200 m Freestyle

- Louise Jöhncke

- Heat — 2:01.13
- B-Final — 2:01.37 (→ 11th place)

- Malin Nilsson

- Heat — 2:04.39 (→ did not advance, 24th place)

Women's 100 m Backstroke

- Therese Alshammar

- Heat — 1:03.79
- B-Final — 1:04.15 (→ 16th place)

Women's 100 m Breaststroke

- Hanna Jaltner

- Heat — 1:10.69
- B-Final — 1:11.41 (→ 16th place)

- Maria Östling

- Heat — 1:11.58 (→ did not advance, 23rd place)

Women's 200 m Breaststroke

- Lena Eriksson

- Heat — 2:31.65
- B-Final — 2:28.87 (→ 9th place)

- Maria Östling

- Heat — 2:33.44 (→ did not advance, 21st place)

Women's 100 m Butterfly

- Johanna Sjöberg

- Heat — 1:01.01
- B-Final — 1:00.76 (→ 9th place)

Women's 200 m Individual Medley

- Louise Karlsson

- Heat — 2:16.37
- Final — 2:17.25 (→ 8th place)

Women's 4 × 100 m Freestyle Relay

- Louise Jöhncke, Johanna Sjöberg, Louise Karlsson, and Linda Olofsson

- Heat — 3:45.39

- Linda Olofsson, Louise Jöhncke, Louise Karlsson, and Johanna Sjöberg

- Final — 3:44.91 (→ 5th place)

Women's 4 × 200 m Freestyle Relay

- Louise Jöhncke, Johanna Sjöberg, Josefin Lillhage, and Åsa Sandlund

- Heat — 8:13.64 (→ did not advance, 9th place)

Women's 4 × 100 m Medley Relay

- Therese Alshammar, Hanna Jaltner, Johanna Sjöberg, and Louise Jöhncke

- Heat — 4:10.88 (→ did not advance, 10th place)

== Tennis ==
Men's Singles Competition

- Thomas Enqvist

- First round — Defeated Marc-Kevin Goellner (Germany) 7-6 4-6 6-4
- Second round — Defeated Sargis Sargsian (Armenia) 4-6 7-6 6-4
- Third round — Lost to Leander Paes (India) 5-7 6-7

- Magnus Gustafsson

- First round — Defeated Ronald Agénor (Haiti) 6-2 6-4
- Second round — Lost to Greg Rusedski (Great Britain) 7-6 6-7 3-6

== Notes ==
- Watkins, Ginger T., ed. (1997). The Official Report of the Centennial Olympic Games, Volume III The Competition Results (PDF). Atlanta: Peachtree Publishers. ISBN 1-56145-150-9.
