= Danahuri Dahliana =

Indonesian archer (born 1972)

Personal information
- Nationality: Indonesian
- Born: 22 February 1972 (age 54)

Sport
- Sport: Archery

Danahuri Dahliana (born 22 February 1972) is an Indonesian archer. She competed in the women's individual and team events at the 1996 Summer Olympics.
