= Joanna Nowicka =

Polish archer (born 1966)

Personal information
- Born: 25 July 1966 (age 60)
Medal record
Women's Archery
Representing Poland
Olympic Games
Bronze medal – third place	1996 Atlanta	Team competition

Joanna Nowicka (née Kwaśna born 25 July 1966 in Kołobrzeg) is a Polish archer, who competed in four consecutive Summer Olympics, starting in 1988. At the 1996 Olympic Games she won the bronze medal in the Women's Team Competition (together with Iwona Dzięcioł and Katarzyna Klata).

For her sport achievements, she received:
Silver Cross of Merit in 1996.
