= Elif Altınkaynak =

Turkish archer (born 1974)

Personal information
- Nationality: Turkish
- Born: 20 August 1974 (age 52) Isparta, Turkey

Sport
- Sport: Archery

Elif Altınkaynak Çahlıyan (born 20 August 1974) is a Turkish archer. She competed at the 1996 Summer Olympics in Atlanta, where she placed 4th in the women's individual contest, and fourth in the team contest with the Turkish team. At the 2000 Summer Olympics in Sydney she again placed 4th with the Turkish team.
