= Christa Bäckman =

Swedish archer (born 1962)

Personal information
- Nationality: Swedish
- Born: 1 August 1962 (age 62); Vänersborg, Sweden

Sport
- Sport: Archery

Christa Bäckman (born 1 August 1962) is a Swedish archer. She competed in the women's individual and team events at the 1996 Summer Olympics. At the World Masters in Turin in 2013 she won Gold.
