= Leanda Hendricks =

South African archer (born 1963)

Personal information
- Nationality: South African
- Born: 3 May 1963 (age 61); Johannesburg, South Africa

Sport
- Sport: Archery

Leanda Hendricks (born 3 May 1963) is a South African archer. She competed in the women's individual and team events at the 1996 Summer Olympics.
