= Archery at the 1996 Summer Olympics =

Archery at the Games of the XXVI Olympiad
- Venue: Stone Mountain Park Archery Center
- Dates: 28 July – 2 August 1996
- No. of events: 4 (2 men, 2 women)
- Competitors: 128 from 41 nations

Archery at the 1996 Summer Olympics in Atlanta consisted of four events, two for men and two for women. The events were held in neighboring Stone Mountain. All archery was done at a range of 70 metres. 64 archers competed in each the men's individual and women's individual competitions. They began with a 72-arrow ranking round. This was followed by three elimination rounds, in which archers competed head-to-head in 18-arrow matches. After these rounds, there were 8 archers left. The quarterfinals, semifinals, and medal matches (collectively termed the "finals round") were 12-arrow matches. In all matches, losers were eliminated and received a final rank determined by their score in that round, with the exception of the semifinals. The losers of the semifinals competed in the bronze medal match.

== Medal summary ==
=== Men ===
Event	Gold	Silver	Bronze
Individual	Justin Huish; United States	Magnus Petersson; Sweden	Oh Kyo-moon; South Korea
Team	United States; Justin Huish; Butch Johnson; Rod White	South Korea; Jang Yong-ho; Kim Bo-ram; Oh Kyo-moon	Italy; Matteo Bisiani; Michele Frangilli; Andrea Parenti

=== Women ===
Event	Gold	Silver	Bronze
Individual	Kim Kyung-Wook; South Korea	He Ying; China	Olena Sadovnycha; Ukraine
Team	South Korea; Kim Jo-Sun; Kim Kyung-Wook; Yoon Hye-Young	Germany; Barbara Mensing; Cornelia Pfohl; Sandra Wagner-Sachse	Poland; Iwona Dzięcioł; Katarzyna Klata; Joanna Nowicka

== Participating nations ==
Forty-one nations contributed archers to compete in the events.

Nation	Men's Individual	Men's Team	Women's Individual	Women's Team	Total
Australia	3	X	2		5
Belarus			2		2
Belgium	1				1
Bhutan	1		1		2
Bulgaria	1				1
Canada	3	X			3
China	3	X	3	X	6
Chinese Taipei	3	X	3	X	6
Estonia	1				1
Finland	3	X			3
France	3	X	1		4
Georgia			1		1
Germany			3	X	3
Great Britain	2		1		3
Hungary			2		2
India	2				2
Indonesia			3	X	3
Ireland	1				1
Italy	3	X	3	X	6
Japan	2		3	X	5
Kazakhstan	3	X	3	X	6
Kenya	1		1		2
Mexico	2		1		3
Moldova			1		1
Mongolia			1		1
Netherlands			2		2
New Zealand	1				1
Norway	1		1		2
Poland	1		3	X	4
Portugal	1				1
Puerto Rico			1		1
Russia	3	X	3	X	6
San Marino	1				1
Slovenia	3	X			3
South Africa			3	X	3
South Korea	3	X	3	X	6
Spain	1				1
Sweden	3	X	3	X	6
Turkey	1		3	X	4
Ukraine	3	X	3	X	6
United States	3	X	3	X	6
Total athletes	64	45	64	45	128
Total NOCs	31	15	29	15	41

== Medal table ==
Rank	Nation	Gold	Silver	Bronze	Total
1	South Korea	2	1	1	4
2	United States	2	0	0	2
3	China	0	1	0	1
3	Germany	0	1	0	1
3	Sweden	0	1	0	1
6	Italy	0	0	1	1
6	Poland	0	0	1	1
6	Ukraine	0	0	1	1
Totals (8 entries)		4	4	4	12

== See also ==
- Archery at the 1996 Summer Paralympics
