= Maxim Cazmirciuc =

Moldovan swimmer (born 1971)

Personal information
- Nationality: Moldova
- Born: 20 February 1971 (age 55)

Sport
- Sport: Swimming

Maxim Cazmirciuc (born 20 February 1971) is a Moldovan butterfly and freestyle swimmer.

Cazmircuic won a silver medal in the 100 metres medley at the 1996 FINA Swimming World Cup in Finland in January 1996 and the bronze medal in Germany in February 1996.

He was the national record holder in the 100 metres medley with a time of 56.55 seconds.

He competed in three events at the 1996 Summer Olympics.
