= Marisol Bretón =

Mexican archer (born 1975)

Personal information
- Nationality: Mexican
- Born: 13 January 1975 (age 51)

Sport
- Sport: Archery
Medal record
Representing Mexico
Pan American Games
Silver medal – second place	2003 Santo Domingo	Team
Bronze medal – third place	1995 Mar del Plata	Individual recurve (50m)
Bronze medal – third place	1995 Mar del Plata	Individual recurve (60m)
Bronze medal – third place	1995 Mar del Plata	Individual recurve (70m)
Bronze medal – third place	1999 Winnipeg	Team
Central American and Caribbean Games
Gold medal – first place	1993 Ponce	Individual recurve (50m)
Gold medal – first place	1993 Ponce	Individual recurve (60m)
Gold medal – first place	1993 Ponce	Individual recurve (70m)
Gold medal – first place	1993 Ponce	Double round recurve
Gold medal – first place	1998 Maracaibo	Individual recurve (60m)
Gold medal – first place	2002 San Salvador	Individual recurve (60m)
Gold medal – first place	2002 San Salvador	Individual recurve
Gold medal – first place	2002 San Salvador	Double round recurve
Gold medal – first place	2002 San Salvador	Team
Silver medal – second place	1993 Ponce	Team
Silver medal – second place	1998 Maracaibo	Individual recurve (70m)
Silver medal – second place	2002 San Salvador	Individual recurve (30m)

Marisol Bretón López (born 13 January 1975) is a Mexican archer who competed in the women's individual event at the 1996 Summer Olympics.
