= Nadejda Palovandova =

Moldovan archer (born 1975)

Personal information
- Nationality: Moldovan
- Born: 1 September 1975 (age 49)

Sport
- Sport: Archery

Nadejda Palovandova (born 1 September 1975) is a Moldovan archer. She competed in the women's individual event at the 1996 Summer Olympics.
