= Alla Vasilenko =

Kazakhstani cyclist

Personal information
- Full name: Alla Vasilenko
- Born: 12 June 1972 (age 54) Kazakh SSR, Soviet Union

Cycling career
- Sport: Cycling
- Disciplines: Road cycling, Track cycling
- Role: Rider

Alla Vasilenko (original name: Алла Алексеевна Василенко; born 12 June 1972) is a track and road cyclist from Kazakhstan. She represented her nation at the 1996 Summer Olympics on the road in the women's road race and on the track in the women's points race.
