= Yana Tuniyants =

Kazakhstani archer

Yana Tunyantse
Personal information
- Nationality: Kazakhstani
- Born: 29 October 1972 (age 53)

Sport
- Sport: Archery

Yana Tunyantse (born 29 October 1972) is a Kazakhstani archer. She competed in the women's individual and team events at the 1996 Summer Olympics.
