= Giuseppina Di Blasi =

Italian archer (born 1979)

Personal information
- Nationality: Italian
- Born: 14 January 1979 (age 46); Menfi, Italy

Sport
- Sport: Archery

Giuseppina Di Blasi (born 14 January 1979) is an Italian archer. She competed in the women's individual and team events at the 1996 Summer Olympics.
