= 1995 World Indoor Archery Championships =

1995 World Indoor Target Archery Championships
- Location: (United Kingdom) Birmingham, UK

The 1995 World Indoor Target Archery Championships were held in Birmingham, England.

== Medal summary (Men's individual) ==
Event	Gold	Silver	Bronze
Recurve Men's individual	(Sweden) Magnus Petersson	(France) Sebastian Flute	(Netherlands) Fred van Zutphen
Compound Men's individual	(United States) Michael Hendriske	(Denmark) Niels Baldur	(United States) Dee Wilde

== Medal summary (Women's individual) ==
Event	Gold	Silver	Bronze
Recurve Women's individual	(Moldova) Natalia Valeeva	(France) Patricia Michel	(Turkey) Natalia Nasaridze
Compound Women's individual	(United States) Glenda Doran	(Sweden) Petra Ericsson	(United Kingdom) Nichola Simpson

== Medal summary (Men's team) ==
Event	Gold	Silver	Bronze
Recurve Men's team	United States (USA); Butch Johnson; Rodney White; Ed Eliason	France (FRA)	Italy (ITA)
Compound Men's team	United States (USA); Michael Hendriksen; Dee Wilde; Reo Wilde	Denmark (DEN)	Italy (ITA)

== Medal summary (Women's team) ==
Event	Gold	Silver	Bronze
Recurve Women's team	Ukraine (UKR); Lena Gerasimenko; Tetyana Muntyan; Natalia Belucha	Russia (RUS); Margarita Galinovskaya; Yelena Tutachikova; N.Badmasirenova	Italy (ITA); Franca Milesi; Paola Fantato; Cristina Loriatti
Compound Women's team	United States (USA); Glenda Doran; Inga Low; Angela Moscarelli	Sweden (SWE); Petra Ericsson; Ulrika Sjöwall; Helena Nelsson	Italy (ITA); Assunta Atorino; Fabiola Palazzini; Carmen Ceriotti
