= Kim Jo-sun (archer) =

South Korean archer (born 1975)

Kim Jo-Sun
Personal information
- Born: June 13, 1975 (age 51)
Medal record
Women's archery
Representing South Korea
Olympic Games
Gold medal – first place	1996 Atlanta	Team
World Championships
Gold medal – first place	1995 Jakarta	Team
Gold medal – first place	1997 Victoria	Team
Bronze medal – third place	1997 Victoria	Individual
Bronze medal – third place	1999 Riom	Individual
Asian Games
Gold medal – first place	1998 Bangkok	Individual
Gold medal – first place	1998 Bangkok	Team

Kim Jo-Sun (Korean: 김조순, born June 13, 1975) is a female South Korean archer and Olympic champion. She competed at the 1996 Summer Olympics in Atlanta, where she won a gold medal with the South Korean archery team (with Kim Kyung-wook and Yoon Hye-young).

She won an individual gold medal at the 1998 Asian Games in Bangkok, as well as a team gold medal.

She married table tennis player Kim Taek-soo in 2000.
