= He Ying =

Chinese archer (born 1977)

Personal information
- Born: April 17, 1977 (age 49) Jilin, China
- Height: 170 cm (5 ft 7 in)
- Weight: 68 kg (150 lb)

Sport
- Club: Jilin Archery Club
Medal record
Women's recurve archery
Representing China
Olympic Games
Silver medal – second place	1996 Atlanta	Individual
Silver medal – second place	2004 Athens	Team
World Championships
Gold medal – first place	2001 Beijing	Team
Silver medal – second place	1999 Riom	Team
Asian Games
Gold medal – first place	1994 Hiroshima	Team
Silver medal – second place	1998 Bangkok	Team
Asian Championships
Gold medal – first place	1999 Beijing	Team
Silver medal – second place	1997 Langkawi	Individual

He Ying (Chinese: 何影; pinyin: Hé Yǐng, born April 17, 1977, in Jilin) is an archer from the People's Republic of China who has competed at three Summer Olympics.

== Career ==
=== 1996 Summer Olympics ===
In 1996 Atlanta Olympics He won the silver in the women's individual event. She competed again in 2000 in Sydney but did not win a medal.

=== 2004 Summer Olympics ===
He achieved the second Olympic silver medal of her career at the 2004 Summer Olympics in the team event. With teammates Lin Sang and Zhang Juanjuan, He defeated Australia, Ukraine and Chinese Taipei in the elimination rounds before falling to South Korea in the gold medal match by a single match.

He placed 4th in the individual ranking round with a score of 667. He went on to defeat Helen Palmer of Great Britain, Melissa Jennison of Australia and Kirstin Jean Lewis of South Africa in the first three rounds, her encounter with Jennison going to a final arrow shoot-off.

In the quarterfinals, He faced eventual bronze medalist Alison Williamson of Great Britain. He was red carded for shooting out of turn, resulting in her highest scoring shot being declared void. She later missed the target entirely with her 10th shot, Williamson winning by a score of 109–89. The Chinese team officials planned to appeal against the result but failed to do so within the allowed time. Her final ranking in the individual competition was 8th.

=== Asian Games ===
He competed in the 1994 Asian Games where she won a gold medal in the team event and in the 1998 Asian Games where she won a silver medal in the team event.

=== Coaching career ===
She is the coach of Li Jiaman who won the 2014 Summer Youth Olympics girls' individual and mixed team gold.
