= Thi Thi Win =

Burmese archer

Thi Thi Win (born 23 July 1971) is an archer from Myanmar. She represented Myanmar in archery at the 2000 Summer Olympics in Sydney, Australia.

== Career ==
Win competed in the 2000 Summer Olympics. She scored 567 points in the ranking round and finished 62nd out of 64. She was defeated 167-134 by Kim Nam-Soon in the round of 64.

Win won a bronze medal in the women's team event in archery at the 2001 Southeast Asian Games.
