= Nichola Simpson =

British archer

Nichola Simpson (born 10 October 1956) is a British archer. She competes in compound archery, and has reached a career high of 4th in the FITA world rankings (23 August 2008).

Simpson is a member of Oxford Archers, and is coached by her husband Ian Simpson.

== Life ==
Simpson was born in Oxford.

== Notable achievements ==
Having taken up archery in 1987, Nichola has been a member of the GB women's compound team since 1993, with whom she won Gold at the 2010 Commonwealth Games. She won a bronze medal at the 1995 World Indoor Archery Championships held in Birmingham and a further Bronze at the 2nd World Cup leg in San Salvador in 2006, which was Great Britain's first Archery World Cup medal. She had her most successful season to date in 2007, winning silver at 2 world cup events, in Poreč and Boé and also the silver medal at the year end Grand Final in Lausanne.

== Records ==
Nichola currently holds the following British records (correct 27 March 2013):

Round	Bow Style	Score	Date	Location
FITA 25	Compound Unlimited	576	14 February 2010	Rutland
Combined FITA	Compound Unlimited	1158	14 February 2010	Rutland

== Awards ==
Simpson was awarded the Oxfordshire Sportswoman of the year award in 2007.
