= Judi Adams =

American archer (born 1959)

Personal information
- Full name: Judith Adams
- Born: 12 July 1959 (age 66) Phoenix, United States

Sport
- Sport: Archery

Judith C. "Judi" Adams (born 12 July 1959) is an American archer. She competed in the 1996 Summer Olympics.

Adams began archery in middle school. She won a gold medal in the 1979 Pan American Games, as well as an individual silver and team bronze at the 1979 Archery World Championships. She earned a spot on the 1980 U.S. Olympic team but did not compete due to the 1980 Summer Olympics boycott. She unsuccessfully tried out for the team again in 1984, 1988, and 1992. She finally qualified, competing in the 1996 Summer Olympics in both team and individual events.

Adams attended Glendale Community College and later transferred Arizona State University. After her archery career, she worked as a project manager for American Express for 30 years before her retirement.
