= Elif Ekşi =

Turkish archer (born 1967)

Personal information
- Nationality: Turkish
- Born: 21 March 1967 (age 58)

Sport
- Sport: Archery

Elif Ekşi (born 21 March 1967) is a Turkish archer. She competed at the 1988 Summer Olympics, the 1992 Summer Olympics and the 1996 Summer Olympics.
