= Christel Verstegen =

Dutch archer (born 1973)

Personal information
- Nationality: Dutch
- Born: 27 March 1973 (age 53) Veghel, Netherlands

Sport
- Sport: Archery

Christel Verstegen (born 27 March 1973) is a Dutch archer. She competed at the 1992 Summer Olympics and the 1996 Summer Olympics.
