= Ai Ouchi =

Japanese archer (born 1974)

Personal information
- Nationality: Japanese
- Born: 17 September 1974 (age 50)

Sport
- Sport: Archery

Ai Ouchi (大内愛, Ōuchi Ai, born 17 September 1974) is a Japanese archer. She competed in the women's individual and team events at the 1996 Summer Olympics.
