= Elena Dostay =

Russian archer (born 1969)

Elena Yevgenyevna Dostay (Russian: Елена Евгеньевна Достай, born 8 March 1969) is a Russian archer.

She was born in Toora-Khem, Todzha district, Tuva ASSR.

Dostay represented Russia at the 1996 and 2004 Summer Olympics. She placed 50th in the women's individual ranking round with a 72-arrow score of 609. In the first round of elimination, she faced 15th-ranked Margarita Galinovskaya, also of Russia. Dostay lost 153-136 in the 18-arrow match, placing 47th overall in women's individual archery.

Dostay was also a member of the 10th-place Russian women's archery team in the 1996 team competition and the 9th-place team in 2004 .
