= Anna Mozhar =

Kazakhstani archer

Personal information
- Nationality: Kazakhstani
- Born: 3 March 1974 (age 52)

Sport
- Sport: Archery

Anna Mozhar (Анна Владимировна Можар, born 3 March 1974) is a Kazakhstani archer. She competed in the women's individual and team events at the 1996 Summer Olympics.
