= Kim Kyung-wook =

South Korean archer (born 1970)

Personal information
- Born: April 18, 1970 (age 56) Yeoju

Sport
- Sport: Archery
Medal record
Women's archery
Representing South Korea
Olympic Games
Gold medal – first place	1996 Atlanta	Individual
Gold medal – first place	1996 Atlanta	Team
World Championships
Gold medal – first place	1989 Lausanne	Team
Silver medal – second place	1989 Lausanne	Individual
Silver medal – second place	2001 Beijing	Individual
Bronze medal – third place	2001 Beijing	Team

Korean name
- Hangul: 김경욱
- RR: Gim Gyeonguk
- MR: Kim Kyŏnguk

Kim Kyung-wook (born April 18, 1970) is a South Korean archer and Olympic champion. She competed at the 1996 Summer Olympics in Atlanta, where she won a gold medal with the South Korean archery team, and also an individual gold medal. Furthermore, Kim Kyung-wook is now the owner and head coach of GK96 archery club located in Cerritos, California. GK96 is a top ranked club in California.
