= Margarita Galinovskaya =

Russian archer (born 1968)

Margarita Viktorovna Galinovskaya (Russian: Маргарита Викторовна Галиновская, born April 19, 1968) is a Russian archer. She competed in the women's individual and team events at the 1996 Summer Olympics.

Galinovskaya represented Russia at the 2004 Summer Olympics. She placed 15th in the women's individual ranking round with a 72-arrow score of 639. In the first round of elimination, she faced 40th-ranked fellow Russian Elena Dostay. Galinovskaya defeated Dostay 153-136 in the 18-arrow match to advance to the round of 32. In that round, she faced 18th-ranked German archer Cornelia Pfohl. Galinovskaya won the match 158-156 in the regulation 18 arrows, advancing to the round of 16. She then lost to 2nd-ranked and eventual silver medalist Lee Sung Jin of Korea 165-163, finishing 12th in women's individual archery.

Galinovskaya was also a member of the 9th-place Russian women's archery team in the team competition.
