= Jill Börresen =

South African archer (born 1973)

Personal information
- Nationality: South African
- Born: 16 December 1973 (age 51); Durban, South Africa

Sport
- Sport: Archery

Jill Börresen (born 16 December 1973) is a South African archer. She competed at the 1996 Summer Olympics and the 2000 Summer Olympics.
