= Giovanna Aldegani =

Italian archer (born 1976)

Personal information
- Nationality: Italian
- Born: 7 December 1976 (age 49) Lido di Venezia, Italy

Sport
- Sport: Archery

Giovanna Aldegani (born 7 December 1976) is an Italian archer. She competed in the women's individual and team events at the 1996 Summer Olympics.
