= Hamdiah Damanhuri =

Indonesian archer (born 1973)

Personal information
- Nationality: Indonesian
- Born: 16 November 1973 (age 51); Indonesia
- Height: 153 cm (5 ft 0 in)
- Weight: 49 kg (108 lb)

Sport
- Country: Indonesia
- Sport: Archery

Hamdiah Damanhuri is an Indonesian Olympic archer. She represented her country in the women's individual competition at the 2000 Summer Olympics. She came 15th place after both rounds, finishing with 637 points.
