= Wang Xiaozhu =

Chinese archer (born 1973)

Personal information
- Born: 15 May 1973 (age 53) Jilin, China
- Height: 176 cm (5 ft 9 in)
- Weight: 63 kg (139 lb)
Medal record
Women's archery
Representing China
Olympic Games
Silver medal – second place	1992 Barcelona	Team
Asian Games
Gold medal – first place	1994 Hiroshima	Team
Silver medal – second place	1998 Bangkok	Team

Wang Xiaozhu (Chinese: 王小竹; pinyin: Wáng Xiǎozhú; born 15 May 1973) is a Chinese archer.

She competed at 1992 Summer Olympics where she won a silver medal in women's team event and came 4th place in women's individual. At the 1996 Summer Olympics she finished 7th in the individual event and 6th in the team event.

She competed at the 1994 Asian Games where she won a gold medal in the women's team event and at the 1998 Asian Games where she won a silver medal in the women's team event.
