= Katarzyna Klata =

Polish archer (born 1972)

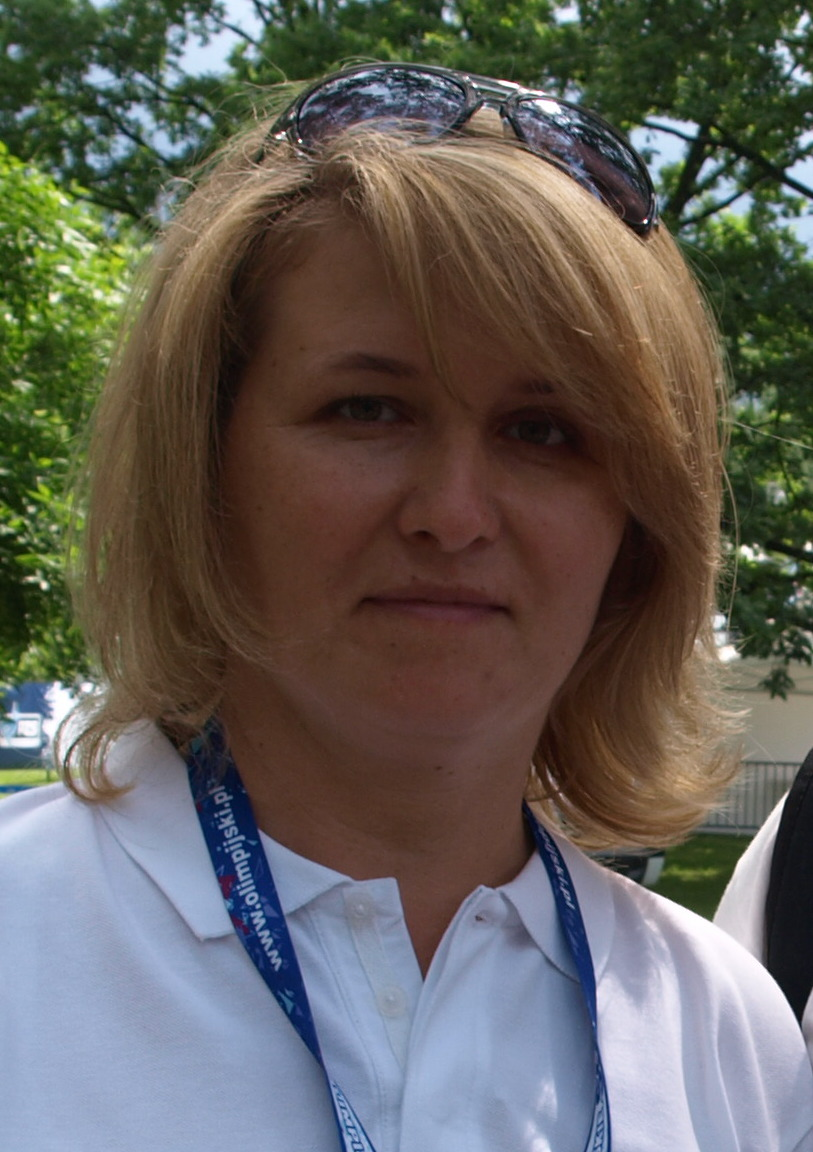

Medal record

Women's archery

Representing Poland

Olympic Games
Bronze medal – third place	1996 Atlanta	Team

Katarzyna Klata (née Kowalska, born 18 October 1972 in Sochaczew, Mazowieckie, Poland) is a Polish archer who was a member of the Polish squad that won the team bronze medals at the 1996 Summer Olympics. She also competed in the individual event, finishing in 25th place.
