= Jargalyn Otgon =

Mongolian archer (born 1957)

Personal information
- Nationality: Mongolian
- Born: 5 February 1957 (age 68)

Sport
- Sport: Archery

Jargalyn Otgon (born 5 February 1957) is a Mongolian archer. She competed at the 1992 Summer Olympics and the 1996 Summer Olympics.
