= Natalia Valeeva =

Italian archer (born 1969)

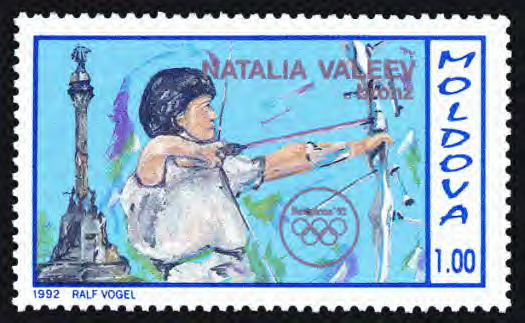

Personal information
- Born: 15 November 1969 (age 57) Tîrnauca, Moldavian SSR, Soviet Union
Medal record
Women's archery
Olympic Games
Representing Unified Team
Bronze medal – third place	1992 Barcelona	Individual
Bronze medal – third place	1992 Barcelona	Team
World Championships
Representing Soviet Union
Silver medal – second place	1991 Kraków	Team
Representing Moldova
Gold medal – first place	1995 Jakarta	Individual
Representing Italy
Gold medal – first place	1999 Riom	Team
Gold medal – first place	2007 Leipzig	Individual
Gold medal – first place	2011 Turin	Team
Silver medal – second place	2001 Beijing	Team
Silver medal – second place	2007 Leipzig	Team
World Indoor Championships
Representing Soviet Union
Gold medal – first place	1991 Oulu	Individual
Representing Moldova
Gold medal – first place	1995 Birmingham	Individual
Silver medal – second place	1993 Perpignan	Individual
Representing Italy
Gold medal – first place	1999 Havana	Individual
Gold medal – first place	2001 Florence	Individual
Gold medal – first place	2009 Rzeszów	Team
Gold medal – first place	2012 Las Vegas	Individual
Silver medal – second place	2009 Rzeszów	Individual
Bronze medal – third place	2012 Las Vegas	Team
European Games
Representing Italy
Gold medal – first place	2015 Baku	Team
Gold medal – first place	2015 Baku	Mixed team
European Championships
Representing Moldova
Silver medal – second place	1996 Kranjska Gora	Individual
Representing Italy
Gold medal – first place	2002 Oulu	Individual
Gold medal – first place	2010 Rovereto	Mixed team
Gold medal – first place	2012 Amsterdam	Mixed team
Silver medal – second place	1998 Boé/Agen	Team
Silver medal – second place	2004 Brucelles	Team
Bronze medal – third place	1998 Boé/Agen	Individual
Bronze medal – third place	2000 Antalya	Team
Bronze medal – third place	2010 Rovereto	Team
European Indoor Championships
Representing Soviet Union
Gold medal – first place	1989 Athens	Team
Gold medal – first place	1989 Athens	Individual
Representing Moldova
Gold medal – first place	1996 Mol	Individual
Representing Italy
Gold medal – first place	2002 Ankara	Individual
Gold medal – first place	2010 Poreč	Individual
Silver medal – second place	2010 Poreč	Team
Silver medal – second place	2011 Cambrils	Team
Silver medal – second place	2013 Rzeszów	Team
Silver medal – second place	2013 Rzeszów	Individual
Mediterranean Games
Representing Italy
Gold medal – first place	2005 Almería	Team
Gold medal – first place	2013 Mersin	Team
Silver medal – second place	2005 Almería	Individual
Bronze medal – third place	2013 Mersin	Individual

Natalia Valeeva (born 15 November 1969) is a Moldavian-born Italian archer. She is a five-time Olympian and former world number one, and a native of Moldova, having represented the Unified Team, Moldova and Italy, at the Olympic Games of 1992, 1996, 2000, 2004, 2008 and 2012. She won the individual and team bronze medals in the 1992 Olympic Games.

== Personal life ==
Valeeva is the mother of twins, and is married to an Italian native (Roberto Cocchi). She is sponsored by Hoyt Archery and Easton Technical Products as a member of their Pro Staff.

== 1992 Summer Olympics ==
Valeeva represented the Unified Team and won the individual bronze medal with Cho Youn-Jeong and Kim Soo-Nyung, both representing South Korea, winning gold and silver. She also won the team bronze medal with Lyudmila Arzhannikova and Khatouna Kvrivichvili with South Korea winning gold and China winning silver.

== 1996 Summer Olympics ==
Valeeva represented Moldova at the 1996 Summer Olympics, where she was defeated in the third round.

== 2000 Summer Olympics ==
Valeeva represented Italy at the 2000 Summer Olympics, gaining seventh place in both the individual and the team event.

== 2004 Summer Olympics ==
In her next Olympic appearance, Valeeva represented Italy at the 2004 Summer Olympics where she placed 9th in the women's individual ranking round with a 72-arrow score of 650. In the first elimination round, held in challenging windy conditions, she faced 56th-ranked Jasmin Figueroa of the Philippines. The biggest upset of the round, this match saw Valeeva lose to Figueroa 132–130 in the 18-arrow match, dropping all the way to 53rd overall in women's individual archery.

== 2007 World Championships ==
In the World Championships of 2007, in Leipzig, Germany, Valeeva won the gold medal, beating Korean top archer Park, holder of the FITA world record for the qualifying round of 1405 points (of a possible 1440). This was Valeeva's second gold medal in the outdoor World Championships, her first having been in 1995. So far in her career, Valeeva has collected 7 individual gold medals in World Championships (indoor and outdoor), and is among the select archers to have won both the Indoor and Outdoor World Championships in the same year, achieving this remarkable feat in 1995.

== 2008 Summer Olympics ==
At the 2008 Summer Olympics in Beijing Valeeva finished her ranking round with a total of 634 points. This gave her the 30th seed for the final competition bracket in which she faced Anastassiya Bannova in the first round, beating the archer from Kazakhstan with 107–105. In the second round she came close, but was eliminated by third seed Joo Hyun-Jung with 110–108. Together with Pia Carmen Maria Lionetti and Elena Tonetta she also took part in the team event. With her 634 score from the ranking round combined with the 613 of Lionetti and the 595 of Tonetta the Italian team was in 9th position after the ranking round. In the first round they were too strong for the team from Chinese Taipei, beating them with 215–211. However, in the quarter-final they were eliminated by the eventual gold medalists from South Korea, despite a 217 points score. The Koreans managed to shoot a new World Record of 231 points to advance to the semi-final. She finished the event at 19th place.

== 2012 Summer Olympics ==
At the 2012 Summer Olympics, she reached the last 32 before being knocked out by Ksenia Perova, and was part of the Italian team that was knocked out by China in the first round.

== Individual performance timeline ==
Tournament	1992	1993	1994	1995	1996	1997	1998	1999	2000	2001	2002	2003	2004	2005	2006	2007	2008	2009	2010	2011	2012	2013	2014	SR
Competitor for	Unified Team	Moldova				Italy																		
World Archery tournaments
Olympic Games	3rd				3R				QF				1R				2R				2R			0/6
World Championships		1R		W		2R		1R		3R		QF		4th		W		4R		3R		1R		2/11
World Cup																								
Stage 1																	W	W		QF	4R	QF		2/5
Stage 2																4th	4th	3R		3R	1R	4R		0/6
Stage 3																4th	QF	3R	2R	3R	1R		4R	0/7
Stage 4																	2R	3R		3R		3R	1R	0/5
World Cup Final																DNQ	4th	DNQ	DNQ	DNQ	DNQ	DNQ	DNQ	0/2
End of year world ranking										5	2	2	10	9	37	3	3	5	25	14	32	25		
