= Kristina Persson-Nordlander =

Swedish archer (born 1969)

Personal information
- Nationality: Swedish
- Born: 12 May 1969 (age 55); Sundsvall, Sweden

Sport
- Sport: Archery

Kristina Persson-Nordlander (born 12 May 1969) is a Swedish archer. She competed at the 1992 Summer Olympics, the 1996 Summer Olympics and the 2000 Summer Olympics.
