= Olena Sadovnycha =

Ukrainian archer (born 1967)

Medal record

Women's archery

Olympic Games
Silver medal – second place	2000 Sydney	Team
Bronze medal – third place	1996 Atlanta	Individual

World Championships
Silver medal – second place	1997 Victoria	Team

European Championships
Silver medal – second place	1996 Kranjska Gora	Team
Bronze medal – third place	2002 Oulu	Team

European Indoor Championships
Gold medal – first place	1998 Oldenburg	Team
Gold medal – first place	2002 Ankara	Team
Silver medal – second place	1996 Mol	Team
Silver medal – second place	1996 Mol	Individual

Olena Anatoliïvna Sadovnycha (Ukrainian: Олена Анатоліївна Садовнича; born November 4, 1967) is an archer from Ukraine who competed in the 1996 and 2000 Summer Olympics.

In Atlanta, she won the bronze medal in the individual event. Four years later she won the silver medal as part of the Ukrainian team.
