= Yoon Hye-young =

South Korean archer (born 1977)

Medal record

Women's archery

Representing South Korea

Olympic Games
Gold medal – first place	1996 Atlanta	Team

Yoon Hye-young (born March 15, 1977) is a South Korean archer and Olympic champion. She competed at the 1996 Summer Olympics in Atlanta, where she won a gold medal with the South Korean archery team.
