= Sandra Wagner-Sachse =

German archer (born 1969)

Medal record

Women's archery

Olympic Games
Silver medal – second place	1996 Atlanta	Team
Bronze medal – third place	2000 Sydney	Team

World Championships
Bronze medal – third place	1999 Riom	Team

Sandra Wagner-Sachse (born September 9, 1969) is an archer from Germany who competed at the 1996 Summer Olympics and at the 2000 Summer Olympics. She won a silver medal in the 1996 team event and a bronze medal in the 2000 team event.
