= Irina Leonova (archer) =

Kazakhstani archer (born 1961)

Personal information
- Nationality: Kazakhstani
- Born: 3 February 1961 (age 64)

Sport
- Sport: Archery

Irina Leonova (born 3 February 1961) is a Kazakhstani archer. She competed in the women's individual and team events at the 1996 Summer Olympics.
