= Cornelia Pfohl =

German archer

Personal information
- Nationality: German
- Born: 23 February 1971 (age 55) Erlabrunn, Breitenbrunn, Saxony, East Germany
- Height: 1.75 m (5 ft 9 in)
- Weight: 58 kg (128 lb)

Sport
- Country: Germany
- Sport: Archery
- Event: Recurve
Medal record
Women's Archery
Representing Germany
Olympic Games
Silver medal – second place	1996 Atlanta	Team
Bronze medal – third place	2000 Sydney	Team

Cornelia Pfohl (born 23 February 1971) is a German archer who contested four consecutive Summer Olympic Games from 1992 to 2004. She is a two-time Olympic medalist in the women's team event, winning silver medal in 1996 and bronze medal in 2000. She attracted attention at both the 2000 and 2004 Olympics for competing while pregnant with her first and second child respectively.

== Career ==
=== Olympic career ===
1992 and 1996 Summer Olympics

Pfohl made her Olympic debut at the 1992 Summer Olympics in Barcelona, finishing forty-fourth overall in the women's individual event. She was also a member of the German team that finished the women's team competition in tenth place.

At the 1996 Summer Olympics Pfohl reached the final of the women's team event. With Germany leading their opponents South Korea by a single point with nine of the match's twenty-seven arrows left, Pfohl shot into the outermost ring of the target, scoring just one point and allowing South Korea to pull ahead to win their third consecutive team gold medal.

2000 and 2004 Summer Olympics

Pfohl competed in the 2000 Summer Olympics while in the early stages of pregnancy with her daughter Mara. She won her second Olympic medal with bronze in the women's team event, and concluded the women's individual event in twenty-fourth place. She was awarded the Silver Laurel Leaf by Federal President Johannes Rau for winning bronze.

Pfohl's qualification for her fourth Olympic Games in 2004 was unexpected, and caused her to delay her plans to get married. Her participation in Athens came while she was pregnant again, this time at 30 weeks with her second child. She placed eighteenth in the ranking round for the women's individual competition. In the first round of elimination, she faced 47th-ranked Marie-Pier Beaudet of Canada. Pfohl defeated Beaudet, winning 146–128 in the 18-arrow match to advance to the round of 32. In that round, she faced Margarita Galinovskaya of Russia, losing to the 15th-ranked archer 158–156 in the regulation 18 arrows.
