= Lin Yi-yin =

Taiwanese archer (born 1973)

Personal information
- Nationality: Taiwanese
- Born: 11 May 1973 (age 53)

Sport
- Sport: Archery

Lin Yi-yin (born 11 May 1973) is a Taiwanese archer. She competed at the 1992 Summer Olympics, the 1996 Summer Olympics and the 2000 Summer Olympics.
