= Jenny Sjöwall =

Swedish archer (born 1971)

Personal information
- Nationality: Swedish
- Born: 17 August 1971 (age 53); Karlstad, Sweden

Sport
- Sport: Archery

Jenny Sjöwall (born 17 August 1971) is a Swedish archer. She competed at the 1988 Summer Olympics, the 1992 Summer Olympics and the 1996 Summer Olympics.
