= Finland at the 1992 Summer Olympics =

- IOC code: FIN
- NOC: Finnish Olympic Committee

in Barcelona July 25, 1992 – August 9, 1992
- Competitors: 88 (60 men and 28 women) in 16 sports
- Flag bearer: Harri Koskela (wrestling)
- Medals Ranked 29th: Gold 1 Silver 2 Bronze 2 Total 5

Summer Olympics appearances (overview)
- 1908; 1912; 1920; 1924; 1928; 1932; 1936; 1948; 1952; 1956; 1960; 1964; 1968; 1972; 1976; 1980; 1984; 1988; 1992; 1996; 2000; 2004; 2008; 2012; 2016; 2020; 2024

Other related appearances
- 1906 Intercalated Games

Finland competed at the 1992 Summer Olympics in Barcelona, Spain. 88 competitors, 60 men and 28 women, took part in 85 events in 16 sports.

== Medalists ==
Medal	Name	Sport	Event	Date
Gold	Mikko Kolehmainen	Canoeing	Men's K-1 500 metres	7 August
Silver	Ismo Falck; Jari Lipponen; Tomi Poikolainen	Archery	Men's team	4 August
Silver	Seppo Räty	Athletics	Men's javelin throw	8 August
Bronze	Antti Kasvio	Swimming	Men's 200 metre freestyle	26 July
Bronze	Jyri Kjäll	Boxing	Light welterweight	7 August

== Competitors ==
The following is the list of number of competitors in the Games.

Sport	Men	Women	Total
Archery	3	0	3
Athletics	13	13	26
Badminton	2	0	2
Boxing	1	–	1
Canoeing	2	0	2
Cycling	1	1	2
Equestrian	0	1	1
Gymnastics	0	1	1
Judo	4	3	7
Rowing	3	0	3
Sailing	5	3	8
Shooting	7	1	8
Swimming	8	4	12
Synchronized swimming	–	1	1
Weightlifting	4	–	4
Wrestling	7	–	7
Total	60	28	88

== Archery ==
The Finnish team sent only men to the 1992 archery tournament. Individually, only Jari Lipponen had much success, taking eighth place after losing in the quarterfinal. As a team, however, the Finnish men were very successful, losing the final match to Spain by only two points to finish with a silver medal.

Men

Athlete	Event	Ranking round		Round of 32	Round of 16	Quarterfinals	Semifinals	Final / BM	
Athlete	Event	Score	Seed	Opposition Score	Opposition Score	Opposition Score	Opposition Score	Opposition Score	Rank
Ismo Falck	Individual	1231	57	Did not advance					
Jari Lipponen	Individual	1312	6 Q	Rivolta (ITA); W 110–101	Rousseau (CAN); W 102–99	Flute (FRA); L 103–109	Did not advance		
Tomi Poikolainen	Individual	1290	21 Q	Barrs (USA); L 100–106	Did not advance				
Ismo Falck; Jari Lipponen; Tomi Poikolainen	Team	3833	5 Q	—N/a	Netherlands; W 237–236	United States; W 239–237	France; W 237–230	Spain; L 236–238	2nd place, silver medalist(s)

== Athletics ==
Men
Track and road events

Athlete	Event	Heats		Quarterfinal		Semifinal		Final	
Athlete	Event	Result	Rank	Result	Rank	Result	Rank	Result	Rank
Risto Ulmala	5000 metres	13:52.52	30	—N/a				Did not advance	
Risto Ulmala	10,000 metres	DNF		—N/a				Did not advance	
Harri Hänninen	Marathon	—N/a						2:15:19	11
Arto Bryggare	110 metres hurdles	13.92	26	Did not advance					
Antti Haapakoski	110 metres hurdles	13.84	21 Q	14.00	21	Did not advance			
Ville Hautala	3000 metres steeplechase	8:34.10	23 q	—N/a		8:33.69	16	Did not advance	
Valentin Kononen	50 kilometres walk	—N/a						3:57:21	7

Field events

Athlete	Event	Qualification		Final	
Athlete	Event	Distance	Position	Distance	Position
Jani Lehtonen	Pole vault	5.50	14	Did not advance	
Asko Peltoniemi	Pole vault	5.55	9 q	5.60	6
Antero Paljakka	Shot put	18.42	20	Did not advance	
Kimmo Kinnunen	Javelin throw	80.22	7 Q	82.62	4
Juha Laukkanen	Javelin throw	79.78	9 q	79.20	6
Seppo Räty	Javelin throw	80.24	6 Q	86.60	2nd place, silver medalist(s)

Combined events – Decathlon

Athlete	Event	100 m	LJ	SP	HJ	400 m	110H	DT	PV	JT	1500 m	Final	Rank
Petri Keskitalo	Result	11.23	7.33	15.41	DNF								
Petri Keskitalo	Points	808	893	815	DNF								

Women
Track and road events

Athlete	Event	Heats		Quarterfinal		Semifinal		Final	
Athlete	Event	Result	Rank	Result	Rank	Result	Rank	Result	Rank
Sisko Hanhijoki	100 metres	11.44	12 Q	11.50	15 Q	11.65	15	Did not advance	
Sisko Hanhijoki	200 metres	23.27	16 Q	23.09	16 Q	23.26	15	Did not advance	
Päivi Tikkanen	3000 metres	8:59.60	21	—N/a				Did not advance	
Päivi Tikkanen	10,000 metres	DNF		—N/a				Did not advance	
Ritva Lemettinen	Marathon	—N/a						2:41:48	14
Minna Painilainen-Soon; Sisko Hanhijoki; Sanna Hernesniemi; Marja Tennivaara	4 × 100 metres relay	43.60	9	—N/a				Did not advance	
Sari Essayah	10 kilometres walk	—N/a						45:08	4

Field events

Athlete	Event	Qualification		Final	
Athlete	Event	Distance	Position	Distance	Position
Ringa Ropo-Junnila	Long jump	6.52	14	Did not advance	
Päivi Alafrantti	Javelin throw	DQ		Did not advance	
Heli Rantanen	Javelin throw	63.98	5 Q	62.34	6

Combined event – Heptathlon

Athlete	Event	100H	HJ	SP	200 m	LJ	JT	800 m	Total	Rank
Helle Aro	Result	13.87	1.70	13.11	25.44	6.23	45.42	2:14.31	6030	18
Helle Aro	Points	997	855	735	847	921	772	903	6030	18
Tina Rättyä	Result	13.96	1.70	12.97	25.09	5.90	49.02	2:15.18	5993	20
Tina Rättyä	Points	984	855	725	879	819	841	890	5993	20
Satu Ruotsalainen	Result	13.35	NM	DNF						
Satu Ruotsalainen	Points	1072	0	DNF						

== Badminton ==
Men

Athlete	Event	Round of 64	Round of 32	Round of 16	Quarterfinals	Semifinals	Final	
Athlete	Event	Opposition Result	Opposition Result	Opposition Result	Opposition Result	Opposition Result	Opposition Result	Rank
Pontus Jäntti	Singles	Borisov (BUL); W 15–6, 15–1	Liu (CHN); L 13–15, 7–15	Did not advance				
Robert Liljequist	Singles	Fernandes (POR); W 15–3, 15–11	Susanto (INA); L 11–15, 3–15	Did not advance				

== Boxing ==
Athlete	Event	Round of 32	Round of 16	Quarterfinals	Semifinals	Final	
Athlete	Event	Opposition Result	Opposition Result	Opposition Result	Opposition Result	Opposition Result	Rank
Jyri Kjäll	Light welterweight	Rey (ESP); W RSC R1	Piccirillo (ITA); W 12–5	Szűcs (HUN); W 9–1	Vinent (CUB); L 3–13	Did not advance	3rd place, bronze medalist(s)

== Canoeing ==
=== Sprint ===
Men

Athlete	Event	Heats		Repechage		Semifinals		Final	
Athlete	Event	Time	Rank	Time	Rank	Time	Rank	Time	Rank
Mikko Kolehmainen	K-1 500 metres	1:41.13	1 SF	Bye		1:41.52	1 F	1:40.34	1st place, gold medalist(s)
Mikko Kolehmainen; Olli Kolehmainen	K-2 500 metres	1:35.75	2 SF	Bye		1:32.57	8	Did not advance	

== Cycling ==
Two cyclists, one man and one woman, represented Finland in 1992.

=== Road ===
Women

Athlete	Event	Time	Rank
Tea Vikstedt-Nyman	Road race	2:05:03	25

=== Track ===
Time trial

Athlete	Event	Time	Rank
Mika Hämäläinen	Time trial	1:06.808	15

Pursuit

Athlete	Event	Qualification		Quarterfinals	Semifinals	Final	
Athlete	Event	Time	Rank	Opposition Time	Opposition Time	Opposition Time	Rank
Tea Vikstedt-Nyman	Women's individual pursuit	3:47.516	8 Q	Watt (AUS); L 3:48.918	Did not advance		

== Equestrianism ==
=== Dressage ===
Athlete	Horse	Event	Qualification		Final	
Athlete	Horse	Event	Score	Rank	Score	Rank
Kyra Kyrklund	Edinburg	Individual	1571	9 Q	1428	5

== Gymnastics ==
=== Rhythmic ===
Athlete	Event	Qualification						Final						
Athlete	Event	Hoop	Rope	Clubs	Ball	Total	Rank	Qualification	Hoop	Rope	Clubs	Ball	Total	Rank
Hanna Laiho	Individual	9.100	9.000	8.700	9.150	35.950	25	Did not advance						

== Judo ==
Men

Athlete	Event	Round of 64	Round of 32	Round of 16	Quarterfinals	Semifinals	Repechage			Final	
Athlete	Event	Round of 64	Round of 32	Round of 16	Quarterfinals	Semifinals	Round 1	Round 2	Round 3	Final	
Athlete	Event	Opposition Result	Opposition Result	Opposition Result	Opposition Result	Opposition Result	Opposition Result	Opposition Result	Opposition Result	Opposition Result	Rank
Marko Korhonen	65 kg	Ward (IRL); L Yusei-gachi	Did not advance								
Jorma Korhonen	71 kg	Bye	Haimberger (AUT); W Yusei-gachi	Věnsek (TCH); W Waza-ari	Dott (GER); L Yusei-gachi	Did not advance	Bye	Carabetta (FRA); L Ippon	Did not advance		
Marko Haanpää	78 kg	Spinks (NZL); L Ippon	Did not advance								
Juha Salonen	+95 kg	—N/a	Raven (NED); L Ippon	Did not advance							

Women

Athlete	Event	Round of 32	Round of 16	Quarterfinals	Semifinals	Repechage			Final	
Athlete	Event	Round of 32	Round of 16	Quarterfinals	Semifinals	Round 1	Round 2	Round 3	Final	
Athlete	Event	Opposition Result	Opposition Result	Opposition Result	Opposition Result	Opposition Result	Opposition Result	Opposition Result	Opposition Result	Rank
Annikka Mutanen	48 kg	Bye	Bornemann (AUT); L Ippon	Did not advance						
Heli Syrjä	72 kg	Håkansson (SWE); L Ippon	Did not advance							
Anne Åkerblom	+72 kg	Maksymow (POL); L Yuko	Did not advance							

== Rowing ==
Men

Athlete	Event	Heats		Repechage		Semifinals		Final	
Athlete	Event	Time	Rank	Time	Rank	Time	Rank	Time	Rank
Pertti Karppinen	Single sculls	7:25.87	4 R	7:08.82	2 SF A/B	7:12.05	4 FB	7:08.15	10
Esko Hillebrandt; Reima Karppinen	Double sculls	6:36.77	3 R	6:53.42	3 SF C/D	6:27.92	1 FC	6:30.93	13

== Sailing ==
Men

Athlete	Event	Race							Net points	Final rank
Athlete	Event	1	2	3	4	5	6	7	Net points	Final rank
Jali Mäkilä	Finn	17	20	25	5.7	30	~~31~~	15	112.7	17
Mika Aarnikka; Petri Leskinen	470	3	18	~~20~~	3	14	20	11.7	69.7	4

Women

Athlete	Event	Race							Net points	Final rank
Athlete	Event	1	2	3	4	5	6	7	Net points	Final rank
Chita Smedberg	Europe	10	28	13	25	3	0	~~30~~	79	10
Anna Slunga-Tallberg; Kati Läike	470	5.7	~~23~~	16	22	17	8	21	89.7	10

Open
Fleet racing

Athlete	Event	Race							Net points	Final rank
Athlete	Event	1	2	3	4	5	6	7	Net points	Final rank
Kalevi Kostiainen; Markku Kuismin	Tornado	22	23	19	19	~~25~~	25	22	130	19

== Shooting ==
Men

Athlete	Event	Qualification		Final	
Athlete	Event	Points	Rank	Points	Rank
Petri Eteläniemi	25 metre rapid fire pistol	585	10	Did not advance	
Juha Hirvi	10 metre air rifle	584	27	Did not advance	
Juha Hirvi	50 metre rifle three positions	1172	1 Q	1264.8	4
Juha Hirvi	50 metre rifle prone	597	4 Q	699.5	6
Timo Näveri	10 metre air pistol	569	39	Did not advance	
Timo Näveri	50 metre pistol	548	31	Did not advance	
Sakari Paasonen	10 metre air pistol	582	6 Q	680.1	5
Sakari Paasonen	50 metre pistol	558	11	Did not advance	
Jari Pälve	10 metre air rifle	585	27	Did not advance	
Jari Pälve	50 metre rifle three positions	1162	11	Did not advance	
Jari Pälve	50 metre rifle prone	592	26	Did not advance	

Women

Athlete	Event	Qualification		Final	
Athlete	Event	Points	Rank	Points	Rank
Pirjo Peltola	10 metre air rifle	380	42	Did not advance	
Pirjo Peltola	50 metre rifle three positions	570	27	Did not advance	

Open

Athlete	Event	Qualification		Final	
Athlete	Event	Points	Rank	Points	Rank
Jorma Korhonen	Skeet	196	16	Did not advance	
Matti Nummela	Trap	136	44	Did not advance	

== Swimming ==
Men

Athlete	Event	Heats		Final A/B	
Athlete	Event	Time	Rank	Time	Rank
Janne Blomqvist	50 metre freestyle	23.63	30	Did not advance	
Janne Blomqvist	100 metre freestyle	51.86	38	Did not advance	
Vesa Hanski	200 metre freestyle	1:53.17	28	Did not advance	
Vesa Hanski	100 metre butterfly	55.81	31	Did not advance	
Vesa Hanski	200 metre butterfly	2:02.75	31	Did not advance	
Kai Johansson	200 metre butterfly	2:05.71	36	Did not advance	
Antti Kasvio	200 metre freestyle	1:48.31	5 FA	1:47.63	3rd place, bronze medalist(s)
Antti Kasvio	400 metre freestyle	3:51.74	9 FB	3:50.06	9
Petteri Lehtinen	200 metre breaststroke	2:20.27	27	Did not advance	
Petteri Lehtinen	200 metre individual medley	2:05.65	21	Did not advance	
Petteri Lehtinen	400 metre individual medley	4:22.10	11 FB	4:22.10	12
Jani Sievinen	100 metre butterfly	54.57	12 FB	54.93	13
Jani Sievinen	200 metre individual medley	2:01.18	1 FA	2:01.28	4
Petri Suominen	100 metre breaststroke	1:03.75	24	Did not advance	
Petri Suominen	200 metre breaststroke	2:18.01	22	Did not advance	
Jani Sievinen; Janne Vermasheinä; Janne Blomqvist; Vesa Hanski	4 × 100 metre freestyle relay	3:25.47	12	Did not advance	
Jani Sievinen; Vesa Hanski; Petteri Lehtinen; Antti Kasvio	4 × 200 metre freestyle relay	7:28.71	12	Did not advance	
Jani Sievinen; Petri Suominen; Vesa Hanski; Antti Kasvio	4 × 100 metre medley relay	4:06.18	20	Did not advance	

Women

Athlete	Event	Heats		Final A/B	
Athlete	Event	Time	Rank	Time	Rank
Anne Lackman	100 metre backstroke	1:06.48	39	Did not advance	
Marja Päivinen	50 metre freestyle	27.49	38	Did not advance	
Marja Päivinen	100 metre freestyle	59.46	38	Did not advance	
Marja Päivinen	100 metre butterfly	1:03.94	32	Did not advance	
Minna Salmela	50 metre freestyle	27.00	31	Did not advance	
Minna Salmela	100 metre freestyle	58.04	24	Did not advance	
Riikka Ukkola	100 metre breaststroke	1:15.56	35	Did not advance	
Anne Lackman; Riikka Ukkola; Marja Päivinen; Minna Salmela	4 × 100 metre medley relay	4:23.07	15	Did not advance	

== Synchronized swimming ==
One synchronized swimmer represented Finland in 1992.

Athlete	Event	Figures		Qualification			Final		
Athlete	Event	Points	Rank	Points	Total (Figures + Qualification)	Rank	Points	Total (Figures + Final)	Rank
Liisa Laurila	Solo	81.765	45 Q	88.120	169.885	19	Did not advance		

== Weightlifting ==
Athlete	Event	Snatch		Clean & jerk		Total	Rank
Athlete	Event	Result	Rank	Result	Rank	Total	Rank
Jouni Grönman	67.5 kg	135.0	6	170.0	5	305.0	5
Janne Kanerva	90 kg	147.5	17	180.0	16	327.5	17
Keijo Tahvanainen	90 kg	147.5	17	187.5	11	335.0	15
Arto Savonen	110 kg	162.5	15	195.0	14	357.5	13

== Wrestling ==
Greco-Roman

Athlete	Event	Group Stage							Final	
Athlete	Event	Opposition Result	Opposition Result	Opposition Result	Opposition Result	Opposition Result	Opposition Result	Rank	Opposition Result	Rank
Ismo Kamesaki	52 kg	Robert (FRA); W 2–1	Jahandideh (IRI); W 6–0	Martínez (CUB); W 4–2	Rebegea (ROU); L 0–7	Min (KOR); L 2–10	—N/a	4	Rizvanović (IOA); W 2–1	7
Keijo Pehkonen	57 kg	Naanaa (MAR); W 4–0	Sheng (CHN); L 4–5	Bye	An (KOR); L 0–8	Did not advance		4	Hall (USA); W 6–4	7
Tuomo Karila	74 kg	Memet (ROU); W 1–0	Tracz (POL); L 1–2	Balcı (TUR); L 1–2	Did not advance			7	Did not advance	
Timo Niemi	82 kg	Khristov (BUL); W 1–0	Frinta (TCH); W 4–2	Arghira (ROU); W 3–0	Turlykhanov (EUN); L 0–1	Stępień (POL); L 0–3	—N/a	3	Kasum (IOA); W 3–1	5
Harri Koskela	90 kg	Komáromi (HUN); L 1–2	Koguashvili (EUN); L 1–2	Did not advance				9	Did not advance	
Juha Ahokas	130 kg	Grigoraș (ROU); L 2–4	Radaković (IOA); W 2–0	Karelin (EUN); L 1–8	Did not advance			4	Poikilidis (GRE); W 1–0	7

Freestyle

Athlete	Event	Group Stage						Final	
Athlete	Event	Opposition Result	Opposition Result	Opposition Result	Opposition Result	Opposition Result	Rank	Opposition Result	Rank
Pekka Rauhala	82 kg	Hohl (CAN); L 2–3	Betancourt (PUR); W 8–5	Khadem (IRI); L 0–8	Did not advance		6	Did not advance	
