= Archery at the 1992 Summer Olympics – Men's team =

Archery at the Olympics

Men's team at the Games of the XXV Olympiad
- Venue: Camp Olímpic de Tir amb Arc
- Dates: 31 July – 4 August 1992
- Competitors: 60 from 20 nations

Medalists
1st place, gold medalist(s)		Juan Holgado; Alfonso Menéndez; Antonio Vázquez	Spain
2nd place, silver medalist(s)		Ismo Falck; Jari Lipponen; Tomi Poikolainen	Finland
3rd place, bronze medalist(s)		Steven Hallard; Richard Priestman; Simon Terry	Great Britain

The men's team was an archery event held as part of the Archery at the 1992 Summer Olympics programme.

== Results ==
The score for the team ranking round was the sum of the three archers' scores in the individual ranking round. No further shooting was done to determine team rankings.

=== Ranking round ===
Rank	Nation	Archers	Score
1	South Korea	Chung Jae-hun; Han Seung-hoon; Lim Hee-sik	3938
2	Unified Team	Vadim Shikarev; Stanislav Zabrodsky; Vladimir Yesheyev	3924
3	Australia	Grant Greenham; Simon Fairweather; Scott Hunter-Russell	3865
4	United States	Jay Barrs; Richard Johnson; Richard McKinney	3840
5	Finland	Jari Lipponen; Tomi Poikolainen; Ismo Falck	3833
6	Great Britain	Simon Terry; Steven Hallard; Richard Priestman	3833
7	Denmark	Ole Gammelgaard; Henrik Toft; Jan Rytter	3817
8	Italy	Andrea Parenti; Alessandro Rivolta; Ilario Di Buò	3808
9	France	Sébastien Flute; Bruno Felipe; Michael Taupin	3806
10	Spain	Antonio Vázquez; Alfonso Menéndez; Juan Holgado	3803
11	Germany	Frank Marzoch; Marc Rösicke; Andreas Lippoldt	3799
12	Netherlands	Erwin Verstegen; Henk Vogels; Berny Camps	3787
13	Japan	Hiroshi Yamamoto; Naoto Oku; Kiyokazu Nishikawa	3786
14	China	Fu Shengjun; Hao Wei; Liang Qiang	3764
15	India	Dhulchand Damor; Limba Ram; Lalremsanga Chhangte	3761
16	Poland	Jacek Gilewski; Konrad Kwiecień; Sławomir Napłoszek	3759
17	Mexico	José Anchondo; Ricardo Rojas; Omar Bustani	3755
18	Turkey	Kerem Ersu; Vedat Erbay; Özcan Ediz	3733
19	Canada	Claude Rousseau; Sylvain Cadieux; Jeannot Robitaille	3701
20	Bhutan	Jubzhang Jubzhang; Karma Tenzin; Pema Tshering	3452

=== Knockout stage ===
Round of 16
South Korea	240
Poland	230
France	235
Italy	229
Finland	237
Netherlands	236
United States	243
Japan	225
Australia	238
China	230
Great Britain	233
Germany	231
Spain	233
Denmark	230
Unified Team	241
India	220

Quarterfinals
South Korea	240
France	241
Finland	239
United States	237
Australia	236
Great Britain	242
Spain	238
Unified Team	229

Semifinals
France	230
Finland	237
Great Britain	234
Spain	236

Final
Finland	236
Spain	238
Bronze medal match
Great Britain	233
France	231

Round of 16

The top sixteen teams in the qualifying round earned the opportunity to compete in the head-to-head elimination matches.

Quarterfinals

All four of the top-ranked teams fell in the quarterfinals, eliminating them from medal contention and leaving such surprise contenders as #10-ranked host nation Spain.

Semifinals

The host nation continued an impressive run by knocking off the #6-ranked British team in a close match.

Final

After having defeated #7-ranked Denmark, #2-ranked Unified Team, and #6-ranked Great Britain, Spain was able to pull off one more astonishing upset, this time against #5-ranked Finland, to claim the gold medal on their home turf. It was Spain's first Olympic medal in archery.

== Sources ==
- Official Report
- Wudarski, Pawel (1999). "Wyniki Igrzysk Olimpijskich" (in Polish). Archived from the original on 18 January 2008.
