= Archery at the 1992 Summer Olympics – Men's individual =

Archery at the Olympics

Men's individual at the Games of the XXV Olympiad
- Venue: Camp Olímpic de Tir amb Arc
- Dates: 31 July – 3 August 1992
- Competitors: 75 from 34 nations

Medalists
1st place, gold medalist(s)		Sébastien Flute	France
2nd place, silver medalist(s)		Chung Jae-hun	South Korea
3rd place, bronze medalist(s)		Simon Terry	Great Britain

The men's individual was an archery event held as part of the Archery at the 1992 Summer Olympics programme. The event took place between 31 July and 3 August 1992. 75 archers competed. As with other archery events at the Olympics, the event featured the recurve discipline.

The competition format was completely revamped from prior Games. Head-to-head competition was introduced, after a ranking round. Furthermore, all archery was now done at a range of 70 metres whereas previously multiple distances were used.

The competition began with a 144-arrow ranking round. The top 32 individual archers were seeded into a single-elimination tournament called the "Olympic round". For each match, the archers shot 12 arrows. In all matches, losers were eliminated and received a final rank determined by their score in that round, with the exception of the semifinals. The losers of the semifinals competed in the bronze medal match. The scores of the ranking round were also used to determine the team ranks for the team competition.

== Results ==
=== Elimination round ===
Rank	Archer	Nation	Ranking round
1	Chung Jae-hun	South Korea	1329
2	Vadim Shikarev	Unified Team	1323
3	Han Seung-hun	South Korea	1318
4	Vladimir Yesheyev	Unified Team	1316
5	Simon Fairweather	Australia	1315
6	Jari Lipponen	Finland	1312
7	Martinus Grov	Norway	1311
8	Hendra Setijawan	Indonesia	1309
9	Hiroshi Yamamoto	Japan	1308
10	Ole Gammelgaard	Denmark	1306
11	Limba Ram	India	1306
12	Jay Barrs	United States	1304
13	José Anchondo	Mexico	1302
14	Sébastien Flute	France	1301
15	Grant Greenham	Australia	1298
16	Henrik Toft	Denmark	1294
17	Paul Vermeiren	Belgium	1294
18	Antonio Vázquez	Spain	1291
19	Im Hui-sik	South Korea	1291
20	Simon Terry	Great Britain	1291
21	Tomi Poikolainen	Finland	1290
22	Claude Rousseau	Canada	1286
23	Steven Hallard	Great Britain	1285
24	Stanislav Zabrodsky	Unified Team	1285
25	Fu Shengjun	China	1284
26	Frank Marzoch	Germany	1283
27	Alessandro Rivolta	Italy	1280
28	Erwin Verstegen	Netherlands	1279
29	Vítor Krieger	Brazil	1277
30	Richard Johnson	United States	1276
31	Bruno Felipe	France	1273
32	Andrea Parenti	Italy	1268
33	Samo Medved	Slovenia	1266
34	Henk Vogels	Netherlands	1266
35	Ivan Ivanov	Bulgaria	1262
36	Jacek Gilewski	Poland	1261
37	Ricardo Rojas	Mexico	1261
38	Marc Rösicke	Germany	1260
39	Ilario Di Buò	Italy	1260
40	Richard McKinney	United States	1260
41	Richard Priestman	Great Britain	1257
42	Alfonso Menéndez	Spain	1257
43	Andreas Lippoldt	Germany	1256
44	Konrad Kwiecień	Poland	1255
45	Juan Holgado	Spain	1255
46	Kerem Ersu	Turkey	1254
47	Naoto Oku	Japan	1253
48	Scott Hunter-Russell	Australia	1252
49	Renato Emílio	Brazil	1251
50	Vedat Erbay	Turkey	1250
51	Hao Wei	China	1249
52	Raul Kivilo	Estonia	1245
53	Changte Lalremsaga	India	1243
54	Sławomir Napłoszek	Poland	1243
55	Berny Camps	Netherlands	1242
56	Michaël Taupin	France	1232
57	Ismo Falck	Finland	1231
58	Liang Qiang	China	1231
59	Özcan Ediz	Turkey	1229
60	Sylvain Cadieux	Canada	1227
61	Kiyokazu Nishikawa	Japan	1225
62	Noel Lynch	Ireland	1225
63	Jubzhang Jubzhang	Bhutan	1221
64	Jan Rytter	Denmark	1217
65	Martin Hámor	Czechoslovakia	1215
66	Dhulchand Damor	India	1212
67	Omar Bustani	Mexico	1192
68	Malcolm Todd	South Africa	1188
69	Fung Yik	Hong Kong	1188
70	Jeannot Robitaille	Canada	1188
71	Karma Tenzin	Bhutan	1162
72	Luis Cabral	Guam	1147
73	Paolo Tura	San Marino	1130
74	Simon Simonis	Cyprus	1117
75	Pema Tshering	Bhutan	1069

=== Knockout stage ===
Round of 32
Chung (KOR)	110
Parenti (ITA)	106
Vermeiren (BEL)	101
Toft (DEN)	97
Zabrodsky (EUN)	108
Yamamoto (JPN)	106
Setijawan (INA)	106
Fu (CHN)	96
Verstegen (NED)	107
Fairweather (AUS)	98
Barrs (USA)	106
Poikolainen (FIN)	100
Terry (GBR)	105
Anchondo (MEX)	94
Yesheyev (EUN)	106
Krieger (BRA)	95
Han (KOR)	107
Johnson (USA)	106
Flute (FRA)	107
Lim (KOR)	102
Rousseau (CAN)	102
Ram (IND)	100
Lipponen (FIN)	110
Rivolta (ITA)	101
Grov (NOR)	106
Marzoch (GER)	94
Hallard (GBR)	103
Gammelgaard (DEN)	98
Greenham (AUS)	100
Vázquez (ESP)	96
Shikarev (EUN)	103
Felipe (FRA)	102

Round of 16
Chung (KOR)	111
Vermeiren (BEL)	102
Zabrodsky (EUN)	102
Setijawan (INA)	104
Verstegen (NED)	104
Barrs (USA)	106
Terry (GBR)	104
Yesheyev (EUN)	102
Han (KOR)	97
Flute (FRA)	106
Rousseau (CAN)	99
Lipponen (FIN)	102
Grov (NOR)	104
Hallard (GBR)	99
Greenham (AUS)	94
Shikarev (EUN)	102

Quarterfinals
Chung (KOR)	106
Setijawan (INA)	104
Barrs (USA)	108
Terry (GBR)	108*
Flute (FRA)	109
Lipponen (FIN)	103
Grov (NOR)	109
Shikarev (EUN)	104

Semifinals
Chung (KOR)	108
Terry (GBR)	102
Flute (FRA)	110
Grov (NOR)	107

Gold medal final
Chung (KOR)	107
Flute (FRA)	110
Bronze medal final
Terry (GBR)	109
Grov (NOR)	103

== Sources ==
- Official Report
- Wudarski, Pawel (1999). "Wyniki Igrzysk Olimpijskich" (in Polish). Archived from the original on 18 January 2008.
