= Judo at the 1996 Summer Olympics – Women's 48 kg =

Women's 48 kg at the Games of the XXVI Olympiad
- Venue: Georgia World Congress Center
- Date: 26 July 1996
- Competitors: 23 from 23 nations

Medalists
1st place, gold medalist(s)		Kye Sun-hui	North Korea
2nd place, silver medalist(s)		Ryoko Tamura	Japan
3rd place, bronze medalist(s)		Amarilis Savón	Cuba
3rd place, bronze medalist(s)		Yolanda Soler	Spain

The women's 48 kg judo competition at the 1996 Summer Olympics in Atlanta involved 23 competitors, limited to judoka whose body weight was less than, or equal to, 48 kg (106 lb). Competition occurred on July 26, 1996, at the Georgia World Congress Center.

Kye Sun-hui of North Korea, at age 16, surprised spectators by winning gold, upsetting the overwhelming favorite, Ryoko Tamura of Japan, in the final. She had obtained a wildcard entry to the Games, and was virtually unknown on the international stage, having never previously competing outside of her home country.

== Results ==
The gold and silver medalists were determined by the final match of the main single-elimination bracket.

Round of 32
Tina Kirkman (AUS)	L
Yu Shu-chen (TPE)	W
Hülya Şenyurt (TUR)	L
Salima Souakri (ALG)	W
Giovanna Tortora (ITA)	W
Andrea Berti (BRA)	L
Ryoko Tamura (JPN)	W
Tatiana Moskvina (BLR)	L
Aiyue Li (CHN)	L
Sarah Nichilo-Rosso (FRA)	W
Tamara Meijer (NED)	W
Nataliya Kuligina (KGZ)	L
Carolyne Lepage (CAN)	L
Yolanda Soler (ESP)	W

Round of 16
Shu-Chen Yu (TPE)	L
Hillary Wolf (USA)	W
Salima Souakri (ALG)	L
Amarilis Savón (CUB)	W
Giovanna Tortora (ITA)	W
Galina Atayeva (TKM)	L
Dora Maldonado (HON)	L
Ryoko Tamura (JPN)	W
Cao Ngọc Phương Trinh (VIE)	L
Sarah Nichilo (FRA)	W
Tamara Meijer (NED)	L
Sun Hui Kye (PRK)	W
Jana Perlberg (GER)	L
Małgorzata Roszkowska (POL)	W
Joyce Heron (GBR)	L
Yolanda Soler (ESP)	W

Quarterfinals
Amarilis Savon (CUB)	W
Hillary Wolf (USA)	L
Ryoko Tamura (JPN)	W
Giovanna Tortora (ITA)	L
Sarah Nichilo (FRA)	L
Sun Hui Kye (PRK)	W
Małgorzata Roszkowska (POL)	L
Yolanda Soler (ESP)	W

Semifinals
Amarilis Savón (CUB)	L
Ryoko Tamura (JPN)	W
Sun Hui Kye (PRK)	W
Yolanda Soler (ESP)	L

Gold medal final
Ryoko Tamura (JPN)	L
Sun Hui Kye (PRK)	W

=== Repechage ===
The losing semifinalists as well as those judoka eliminated in earlier rounds by the four semifinalists of the main bracket advanced to the repechage. These matches determined the two bronze medalists for the event.

First round
Bye
Salima Souakri (ALG)	W
Tatiana Moskvina (BLR)	W
Dora Maldonado (HON)	L
Bye
Tamara Meijer (NED)	W
Joyce Heron (GBR)	W
Carolyne Lepage (CAN)	L

Second round
Salima Souakri (ALG)	W
Hillary Wolf (USA)	L
Tatiana Moskvina (BLR)	W
Giovanna Tortora (ITA)	L
Tamara Meijer (NED)	L
Sarah Nichilo (FRA)	W
Joyce Heron (GBR)	L
Małgorzata Roszkowska (POL)	W

Third round
Salima Souakri (ALG)	W
Tatiana Moskvina (BLR)	L
Sarah Nichilo (FRA)	W
Małgorzata Roszkowska (POL)	L

Bronze medal finals
Salima Souakri (ALG)	L
Yolanda Soler (ESP)	W
Sarah Nichilo (FRA)	L
Amarilis Savón (CUB)	W
