= Archery at the 1980 Summer Olympics – Men's individual =

Men's individual at the Games of the XXII Olympiad
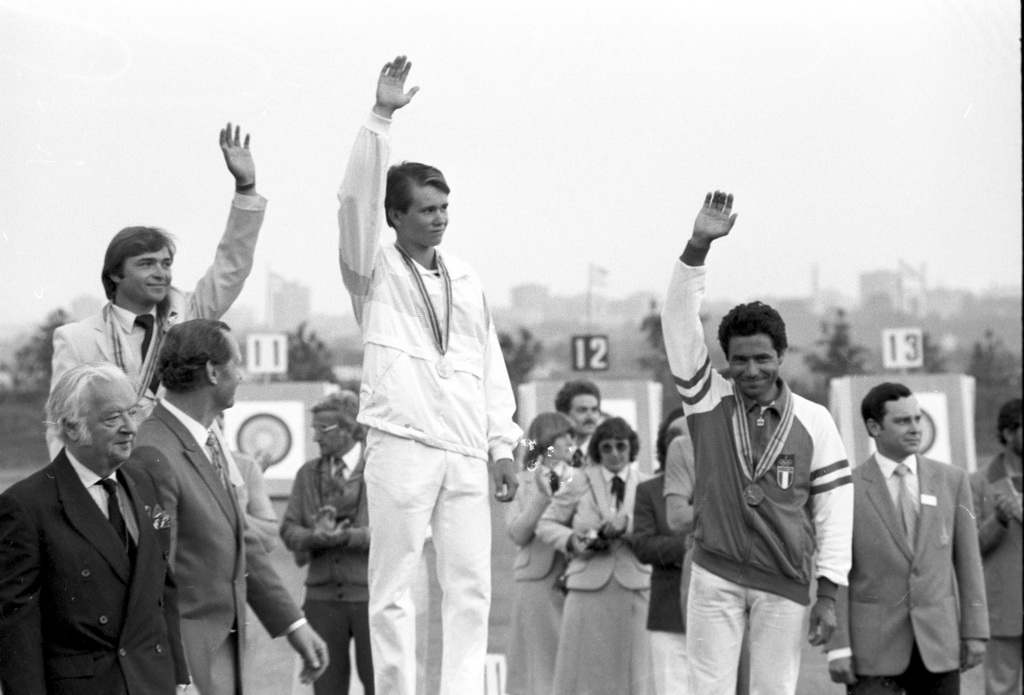
- Medal presentation after the conclusion of the event
- Venue: Krylatskoye Sports Complex Archery Field
- Dates: 30 July – 2 August 1980
- Competitors: 38 from 25 nations
- Winning score: 2455

Medalists
1st place, gold medalist(s)		Tomi Poikolainen	Finland
2nd place, silver medalist(s)		Boris Isachenko	Soviet Union
3rd place, bronze medalist(s)		Giancarlo Ferrari	Italy

The men's individual archery event at the 1980 Summer Olympics was part of the archery programme. The event consisted of a double FITA round. For each round, the archer shot 36 arrows at each of four distances—90, 50, 70, and 30 metres. The highest score for each arrow was 10 points, giving a possible maximum of 2880 points.

== Results ==
Rank	Archer	Nation	Round 1 Score	Round 1 Rank	Round 2 Score	Round 2 Rank	Total Score
1st place, gold medalist(s)	Tomi Poikolainen	Finland	1220	5	1235	2	2455
2nd place, silver medalist(s)	Boris Isachenko	Soviet Union	1217	8	1235	1	2452
3rd place, bronze medalist(s)	Giancarlo Ferrari	Italy	1215	9	1234	3	2449
4	Mark Blenkarne	Great Britain	1224	2	1222	6	2446
5	Béla Nagy	Hungary	1225	1	1221	8	2446
6	Vladimir Yesheyev	Soviet Union	1222	3	1210	10	2432
7	Kyösti Laasonen	Finland	1212	10	1207	11	2419
8	Marinus Reniers	Netherlands	1205	12	1213	9	2418
9	Robert Cogniaux	Belgium	1218	7	1196	13	2414
10	Krzysztof Włosik	Poland	1178	19	1232	4	2410
11	Zoran Matković	Yugoslavia	1187	16	1223	5	2410
12	Göran Bjerendal	Sweden	1187	17	1221	7	2408
13	Dennis Savory	Great Britain	1220	4	1187	16	2407
14	Sante Spigarelli	Italy	1205	13	1200	12	2405
15	Andrei Berki	Romania	1200	15	1189	15	2389
16	André Braun	Luxembourg	1218	6	1168	20	2386
17	Willy Van Den Bossche	Belgium	1210	11	1174	18	2384
18	Romeo Frigo	Switzerland	1171	21	1193	14	2364
19	Niamtseren Biambasuren	Mongolia	1178	20	1183	17	2361
20	Rolf Svensson	Sweden	1184	18	1173	19	2357
21	Peter Mitterer	Austria	1169	23	1167	21	2336
22	Kim Gye-jong	North Korea	1203	14	1128	26	2331
23	Tserendorjin Dagvadorj	Mongolia	1171	22	1147	23	2318
24	František Hadaš	Czechoslovakia	1148	25	1157	22	2305
25	Mihai Bîrzu	Romania	1146	26	1134	24	2280
26	Scott Dumbrell	Australia	1142	27	1129	25	2271
27	Emilio Dutra e Mello	Brazil	1139	28	1125	27	2264
28	István Balázs	Hungary	1123	29	1118	28	2241
29	Antonio Vázquez	Spain	1149	24	1091	32	2240
30	Petko Kichev	Bulgaria	1117	30	1116	29	2233
31	William Swords	Ireland	1106	32	1106	31	2212
32	Patrick Jopp	Switzerland	1077	34	1113	30	2190
33	Francisco Peralta	Spain	1111	31	1070	35	2181
34	David Milne	Zimbabwe	1088	33	1058	36	2146
35	Juan Wedel	Costa Rica	1075	35	1071	34	2146
36	Jorge Murillo	Costa Rica	1041	36	1086	33	2127
37	James Conroy	Ireland	1017	37	1041	37	2058
38	Leo Portelli	Malta	860	38	947	38	1807
