= 1987 European Indoor Archery Championships =

1987 European Indoor Championships
- Location: Paris, France
- Dates: 7–8 February 1987

The 1987 European Indoor Archery Championships was the 3rd edition of the European Indoor Archery Championships. The event was held in Paris, France from 7 to 8 February 1987.

== Medal table ==
* Host nation (France)

Rank	Nation	Gold	Silver	Bronze	Total
1	Soviet Union	4	0	1	5
2	West Germany	0	2	0	2
3	France*	0	1	1	2
3	Sweden	0	1	1	2
5	Belgium	0	0	1	1
Totals (5 entries)		4	4	4	12

== Medal summary ==
=== Recurve ===
Event	Gold	Silver	Bronze
Men's individual	Igor Prokopyev; Soviet Union	Manfred Barth; West Germany	Marnix Vervinck; Belgium
Women's individual	Lyudmila Arzhannikova; Soviet Union	Lisa Andersson; Sweden	Zebiniso Rustamova; Soviet Union
Men's team	Soviet Union; Igor Prokopyev; Vladimir Yesheyev; Boris Isachenko	West Germany; Manfred Barth; Andreas Lippoldt; Emmerich Klaus	France; Vincent Weis; Thierry Venant; Bruno Felipe
Women's team	Soviet Union; Lyudmila Arzhannikova; Zebiniso Rustamova; Yelena Marfel	France; Nathalie Hibon; Marie-Josée Bazin; Catherine Pellen	Sweden; Lisa Andersson; Christa Bäckman; Nettan Andersson
