= 1989 European Indoor Archery Championships =

1989 European Indoor Championships
- Location: Athens, Greece
- Dates: 1–3 December 1989

The 1989 European Indoor Archery Championships was the 4th edition of the European Indoor Archery Championships. The event was held in Athens, Greece from 1 to 3 December 1989.

== Medal table ==
* Host nation (Greece)

| Rank | Nation | Gold | Silver | Bronze | Total |
|---|---|---|---|---|---|
| 1 | Soviet Union | 3 | 1 | 0 | 4 |
| 2 | Netherlands | 1 | 2 | 0 | 3 |
| 3 | West Germany | 0 | 1 | 1 | 2 |
| 4 | Belgium | 0 | 0 | 2 | 2 |
| 5 | Romania | 0 | 0 | 1 | 1 |
| Totals (5 entries) | | 4 | 4 | 4 | 12 |

== Medal summary ==
=== Recurve ===
| Event | Gold | Silver | Bronze |
|---|---|---|---|
| Men's individual | Erwin Verstegen; Netherlands | Yaroslav Gusak; Soviet Union | Robin Van de Meulebroecke; Belgium |
| Women's individual | Natalia Valeeva; Soviet Union | Jacqueline van Rozendaal-van Gerven; Netherlands | Marina Moloce; Romania |
| Men's team | Soviet Union; Yaroslav Gusak; Vladimir Yesheyev; Stanislav Zabrodsky | West Germany; Manfred Barth; Andreas Lippoldt; Udo Böttcher | Belgium; Robin Van de Meulebroecke; Claude Royer; Paul Vermeiren |
| Women's team | Soviet Union; Natalia Valeeva; Natalia Nasaridze; Vera Kolesnikova | Netherlands; Jacqueline van Rozendaal-van Gerven; Christel Verstegen; Sjan van Dijk | West Germany; Heike Eichinger; Claudia Kriz; Doris Haas |
