= Archery at the 1976 Summer Olympics – Men's individual =

Men's individual at the Games of the XXI Olympiad
- Venue: Olympic Archery Field, Joliette
- Dates: 27–30 July 1976
- Competitors: 37 from 23 nations
- Winning score: 2571

Medalists
1st place, gold medalist(s)		Darrell Pace	United States
2nd place, silver medalist(s)		Hiroshi Michinaga	Japan
3rd place, bronze medalist(s)		Giancarlo Ferrari	Italy

The men's individual archery event at the 1976 Summer Olympics was part of the archery programme. The event consisted of a double FITA round. For each round, the archer shot 36 arrows at each of four distances—90, 50, 70, and 30 metres. The highest score for each arrow was 10 points, giving a possible maximum of 2880 points. 23 nations sent 37 archers to the men's competition.

The American men placed first and second in the first round, as Darrell Pace missed the Olympic record set by fellow American John Williams in 1972 by only 4 points. In the second round, Pace improved his score by 43 points, smashing both the single and double FITA round records as he won gold. Richard McKinney fell to fourth place in the final rankings, however, as Hiroshi Michinaga of Japan and Giancarlo Ferrari of Italy surged forward to grab the silver and bronze medals, respectively.

== Records ==
The following new Olympic records were set during this competition.

Record	Round	Name	Nationality	Score	OR
Single FITA round	Second	Darrell Pace	United States	1307	OR
Double FITA round	Combined	Darrell Pace	United States	2571	OR

== Results ==
Rank	Archer	Nation	Round 1 Score	Round 1 Rank	Round 2 Score	Round 2 Rank	Total Score
1st place, gold medalist(s)	Darrell Pace	United States	1264	1	1307 (OR)	1	2571 (OR)
2nd place, silver medalist(s)	Hiroshi Michinaga	Japan	1226	3	1276	2	2502
3rd place, bronze medalist(s)	Giancarlo Ferrari	Italy	1220	4	1275	3	2495
4	Richard McKinney	United States	1230	2	1241	6	2471
5	Vladimir Chendarov	Soviet Union	1217	5	1250	4	2467
6	Willi Gabriel	West Germany	1203	8	1232	8	2435
7	Dave Mann	Canada	1190	12	1241	5	2431
8	Takanobu Nishi	Japan	1191	10	1231	9	2422
9	Bojan Postružnik	Yugoslavia	1190	14	1231	10	2421
10	Sante Spigarelli	Italy	1212	6	1207	18	2419
11	Rolf Svensson	Sweden	1204	7	1208	17	2412
12	Albert le Tyrant	France	1190	13	1218	13	2408
13	David Anear	Australia	1173	15	1234	7	2407
14	Gunnar Jervill	Sweden	1196	9	1210	15	2406
15	Kyösti Laasonen	Finland	1159	18	1220	12	2379
16	Edward Gamble	Canada	1158	19	1204	19	2362
17	Jan Popowicz	Poland	1154	22	1201	20	2355
18	Pierre Blacks	Belgium	1169	17	1184	24	2353
19	Donald Pandiangan	Indonesia	1191	11	1162	26	2353
20	Kauko Laasonen	Finland	1156	20	1192	21	2348
21	David Pink	Great Britain	1126	29	1221	11	2347
22	Wojciech Szymańczyk	Poland	1137	25	1209	16	2346
23	Robert Cogniaux	Belgium	1132	27	1214	14	2346
24	Jan Erik Humlekjær	Norway	1148	23	1189	22	2337
25	Arne Jacobsen	Denmark	1173	16	1161	27	2334
26	Terry Reilly	Australia	1155	21	1176	25	2331
27	Rudolf Schiffl	West Germany	1141	24	1185	23	2326
28	Nyamtserengiin Byambasüren	Mongolia	1111	30	1145	29	2256
29	James Conroy	Ireland	1128	28	1127	31	2255
30	Stewart Littlefair	Great Britain	1096	32	1142	30	2238
31	Edgardo Berdeguer	Puerto Rico	1040	34	1160	28	2200
32	Tserendorjiin Dagvadorj	Mongolia	1081	33	1098	32	2179
33	Oswald Probst	Austria	1135	26	1038	34	2173
34	Juan José Wedel	Costa Rica	1097	31	1068	33	2165
35	Vallop Potaya	Thailand	1023	35	1037	35	2060
36	Wijit Suksompong	Thailand	1007	36	1025	36	2032
37	Luis González	Costa Rica	1000	37	1005	37	2005
