= Judo at the 1992 Summer Olympics – Women's 48 kg =

Judo at the Olympics

Women's 48 kg at the Games of the XXV Olympiad
- Venue: Palau Blaugrana
- Date: 2 August 1992
- Competitors: 22 from 22 nations

Medalists
| 1st place, gold medalist(s) | | Cécile Nowak | France |
| 2nd place, silver medalist(s) | | Ryoko Tani | Japan |
| 3rd place, bronze medalist(s) | | Amarilis Savón | Cuba |
| 3rd place, bronze medalist(s) | | Hülya Şenyurt | Turkey |

The women's 48 kg competition in judo at the 1992 Summer Olympics in Barcelona was held on 2 August at the Palau Blaugrana. The gold medal was won by Cécile Nowak of France.

== Results ==
=== Main brackets ===
==== Pool A ====
Round of 32
Yolanda Soler (ESP) | WAZ
Yu Hui-jun (KOR) | E
Brigitte Lastrade (CAN) | RA
Karen Briggs (GBR) | YUK
Ryoko Tani (JPN) | YUK
Amarilis Savón (CUB) | RA
Li Aiyue (CHN) | YUK
Leposava Marković (IOA) | E

Round of 16
Yolanda Soler (ESP) | YUK
Małgorzata Roszkowska (POL) | E
Karen Briggs (GBR) | WAZ
Khishigbatyn Erdenet-Od (MGL) | RA
Ryoko Tani (JPN) | IPO
Andrea Rodrigues (BRA) | RA
Li Aiyue (CHN) | WAZ
Kang Yong-ok (PRK) | E

Quarterfinal
Yolanda Soler (ESP) | RA
Karen Briggs (GBR) | IPO
Ryoko Tani (JPN) | IPO
Li Aiyue (CHN) | RA

Semifinal
Karen Briggs (GBR) | RB
Ryoko Tani (JPN) | HAN

==== Pool B ====
Round of 32
Huang Yu-shin (TPE) | E
Kerstin Emich (GER) | YUK
Cécile Nowak (FRA) | WO
C. Mariani (ARG) | DNS
V. Lafon (USA) | DNS
Michaela Bornemann (AUT) | WO
Salima Souakri (ALG) | YUS
Donna Hilton (NZL) | RB

Round of 16
Kerstin Emich (GER) | E
Giovanna Tortora (ITA) | YUK
Cécile Nowak (FRA) | IPO
Hülya Şenyurt (TUR) | RB
Michaela Bornemann (AUT) | IPO
Annikka Mutanen (FIN) | E
Salima Souakri (ALG) | YUS
María Villapol (VEN) | RB

Quarterfinal
Giovanna Tortora (ITA) | RB
Cécile Nowak (FRA) | KIK
Michaela Bornemann (AUT) | RB
Salima Souakri (ALG) | KOK

Semifinal
Cécile Nowak (FRA) | IPO
Salima Souakri (ALG) | RA

=== Repechages ===
==== Repechage A ====
Repechage round 1
Brigitte Lastrade (CAN) | IPO
Khishigbatyn Erdenet-Od (MGL) | E
Amarilis Savón (CUB) | SHI
Andrea Rodrigues (BRA) | E

Repechage quarterfinal
Brigitte Lastrade (CAN) | E
Yolanda Soler (ESP) | YUS
Amarilis Savón (CUB) | IPO
Li Aiyue (CHN) | E

Repechage semifinal
Yolanda Soler (ESP) | E
Amarilis Savón (CUB) | IPO

Repechage final
Amarilis Savón (CUB) | YUS (bronze)
Salima Souakri (ALG) | E

==== Repechage B ====
Repechage round 1
Donna Hilton (NZL) | E
María Villapol (VEN) | IPO

Repechage quarterfinal
Hülya Şenyurt (TUR) | FUS
Giovanna Tortora (ITA) | E
María Villapol (VEN) | WAZ
Michaela Bornemann (AUT) | E

Repechage semifinal
Hülya Şenyurt (TUR) | YUK
María Villapol (VEN) | E

Repechage final
Hülya Şenyurt (TUR) | WAZ (bronze)
Karen Briggs (GBR) | E

=== Final ===
| Final |
| Ryoko Tani (JPN) | 2nd place, silver medalist(s) |
| Cécile Nowak (FRA) | KOK (gold) |

== Final classification ==
| Rank | Judoka | Nation |
|---|---|---|
| 1st place, gold medalist(s) | Cécile Nowak | France |
| 2nd place, silver medalist(s) | Ryoko Tani | Japan |
| 3rd place, bronze medalist(s) | Amarilis Savón | Cuba |
| 3rd place, bronze medalist(s) | Hülya Şenyurt | Turkey |
| 5T | Karen Briggs | Great Britain |
| 5T | Salima Souakri | Algeria |
| 7T | Yolanda Soler | Spain |
| 7T | María Villapol | Venezuela |
| 9T | Brigitte Lastrade | Canada |
| 9T | Li Aiyue | China |
| 9T | Michaela Bornemann | Austria |
| 9T | Giovanna Tortora | Italy |
| 13T | Khishigbatyn Erdenet-Od | Mongolia |
| 13T | Andrea Rodrigues | Brazil |
| 13T | Donna Hilton | New Zealand |
| 16T | Małgorzata Roszkowska | Poland |
| 16T | Kang Yong-ok | North Korea |
| 16T | Annikka Mutanen | Finland |
| 16T | Kerstin Emich | Germany |
| 20T | Yu Hui-jun | South Korea |
| 20T | Leposava Marković | Independent Olympic Athletes |
| 20T | Huang Yu-shin | Chinese Taipei |
