= 1985 European Indoor Archery Championships =

1985 European Indoor Championships
- Location: Odense, Denmark
- Dates: 15–16 March 1985

The 1985 European Indoor Archery Championships was the 2nd edition of the European Indoor Archery Championships. The event was held in Odense, Denmark from 15 to 16 March 1985.

== Medal table ==
* Host nation (Denmark)

Rank	Nation	Gold	Silver	Bronze	Total
1	Soviet Union	4	2	1	7
2	West Germany	0	1	1	2
3	Finland	0	1	0	1
4	Poland	0	0	1	1
4	Sweden	0	0	1	1
Totals (5 entries)		4	4	4	12

== Medal summary ==
=== Recurve ===
Event	Gold	Silver	Bronze
Men's individual	Yury Leontyev; Soviet Union	Munko-Badra Dashitserenov; Soviet Union	Göran Bjerendal; Sweden
Women's individual	Yelena Marfel; Soviet Union	Zebiniso Rustamova; Soviet Union	Sirkka Karinkanta; Finland
Men's team	Soviet Union; Yury Leontyev; Munko-Badra Dashitserenov; Jarosław Gusak	Sweden; Göran Bjerendal; Mats Nordlander; Tommy Quick	Poland; Konrad Kwiecień; Krzysztof Włosik; Jan Popowicz
Women's team	Soviet Union; Yelena Marfel; Zebiniso Rustamova; Handa Gomboshafova	West Germany; Erika Wölfe; Brigitte Herth; Ingeborg Stroer	Finland; Sirkka Karinkanta; Aino Mäkelä; Päivi Meriluoto
