= Judo at the 1998 Asian Games – Women's 48 kg =

Judo competition

Women's 48 kg at the 1998 Asian Games
- Venue: Thammasat Gymnasium 1
- Date: 7 December 1998
- Competitors: 14 from 14 nations

Medalists
gold medal	Tomoe Makabe	Japan
silver medal	Cha Hyon-hyang	North Korea
bronze medal	Gao Lijuan	China
bronze medal	Nuanchan Tangprapassorn	Thailand

The women's 48 kilograms (Extra lightweight) competition at the 1998 Asian Games in Bangkok was held on 7 December 1998 at the Thammasat Gymnasium 1.

== Schedule ==
All times are Indochina Time (UTC+07:00)

Date	Time	Event
Monday, 7 December 1998	14:00	Round 1
Monday, 7 December 1998	14:00	Quarterfinals
Monday, 7 December 1998	14:00	Repechage
Monday, 7 December 1998	14:00	Semifinals
Monday, 7 December 1998	14:00	Finals

== Results ==
Legend

- DEC — Won by decision
- IPP — Won by ippon
- WAZ — Won by waza-ari
- WO — Won by walkover
- YUK — Won by yuko

=== Main bracket ===
Round 1
Gao Lijuan (CHN)	WAZ
Sholpan Kaliyeva (KAZ)
Cha Hyon-hyang (PRK)	WO
Dügersürengiin Altantsetseg (MGL)
Lao Fong Peng (MAC)
Nuanchan Tangprapassorn (THA)	IPP
Nguyễn Thị Kim Vui (VIE)	IPP
Lau Kuk Man (HKG)
Oh Soon-young (KOR)	IPP
Kamla Rawat (IND)
Galina Ataýewa (TKM)
Tomoe Makabe (JPN)	WO

Quarterfinals
Gao Lijuan (CHN)
Cha Hyon-hyang (PRK)	YUK
Nuanchan Tangprapassorn (THA)	YUK
Nataliya Kuligina (KGZ)
Nguyễn Thị Kim Vui (VIE)
Oh Soon-young (KOR)	IPP
Tomoe Makabe (JPN)	IPP
Yu Shu-chen (TPE)

Semifinals
Cha Hyon-hyang (PRK)	YUK
Nuanchan Tangprapassorn (THA)
Oh Soon-young (KOR)
Tomoe Makabe (JPN)	IPP

Final
Cha Hyon-hyang (PRK)
Tomoe Makabe (JPN)	DEC

=== Repechage ===
Repechage 1
Dügersürengiin Altantsetseg (MGL)
Gao Lijuan (CHN)	WO
Lao Fong Peng (MAC)
Nataliya Kuligina (KGZ)	IPP
Kamla Rawat (IND)	DEC
Nguyễn Thị Kim Vui (VIE)
Galina Ataýewa (TKM)
Yu Shu-chen (TPE)	WO

Repechage 2
Gao Lijuan (CHN)	IPP
Nataliya Kuligina (KGZ)
Kamla Rawat (IND)	DEC
Yu Shu-chen (TPE)

Bronze medals
Gao Lijuan (CHN)	IPP
Oh Soon-young (KOR)
Kamla Rawat (IND)
Nuanchan Tangprapassorn (THA)	WAZ
