= 1983 European Indoor Archery Championships =

1983 European Indoor Championships
- Location: Falun, Sweden
- Dates: 5–6 March 1983
- Competitors: 18 from 5 nations

The 1983 European Indoor Archery Championships was the 1st edition of the European Indoor Archery Championships. The event was held in Falun, Sweden from 5 to 6 March 1983.

== Medal table ==
* Host nation (Sweden)

Rank	Nation	Gold	Silver	Bronze	Total
1	Soviet Union	4	2	1	7
2	France	0	1	1	2
3	Finland	0	1	0	1
4	Netherlands	0	0	1	1
4	Sweden*	0	0	1	1
Totals (5 entries)		4	4	4	12

== Medal summary ==
=== Recurve ===
Event	Gold	Silver	Bronze
Men's individual	Vladimir Yesheyev; Soviet Union	Boris Isachenko; Soviet Union	Daniel Schneider; France
Women's individual	Natalya Butuzova; Soviet Union	Zebiniso Rustamova; Soviet Union	Lyudmila Arzhannikova; Soviet Union
Men's team	Soviet Union; Vladimir Yesheyev; Boris Isachenko; Vladimir Maksimov	France; Daniel Schneider; Gilles Néron; Dominique Baudrimont	Netherlands; Harry Diels; Gerrie Van Roosendaal; G. Konings
Women's team	Soviet Union; Natalya Butuzova; Zebiniso Rustamova; Lyudmila Arzhannikova	Finland; Päivi Meriluoto; Riitta Peltonen; Jutta Vähäoja	Sweden; Lisa Andersson; Kerstin Wass; Monica Nilsson
