= 2006 European Indoor Archery Championships =

2006 European Indoor Championships
- Location: Jaén, Spain
- Dates: 13–18 March 2006

The 2006 European Indoor Archery Championships was the 10th edition of the European Indoor Archery Championships. The event was held in Jaén, Spain from 13 to 18 March 2006.

== Medal table ==
* Host nation (Spain)

Rank	Nation	Gold	Silver	Bronze	Total
1	France	2	2	3	7
2	Denmark	2	0	0	2
3	Italy	1	3	1	5
4	Ukraine	1	2	0	3
5	Russia	1	0	0	1
5	Turkey	1	0	0	1
7	Great Britain	0	1	0	1
8	Spain*	0	0	2	2
9	Germany	0	0	1	1
9	Netherlands	0	0	1	1
Totals (10 entries)		8	8	8	24

== Medal summary ==
=== Recurve ===
Event	Gold	Silver	Bronze
Men's individual	Alessandro Rivolta; Italy	Markiyan Ivashko; Ukraine	Marco Galiazzo; Italy
Women's individual	Bérengère Schuh; France	Naomi Folkard; Great Britain	Almudena Gallardo; Spain
Men's team	Ukraine; Markiyan Ivashko; Viktor Ruban; Pavlo Bekker	Italy; Michele Frangilli; Marco Galiazzo; Alessandro Rivolta	France; Jérôme Firon; Michael Verge; Olivier Tavernier
Women's team	Turkey; Derya Bard Sarıaltın; Natalia Nasaridze; Damla Günay	Ukraine; Tetiana Dorokhova; Viktoriya Koval; Kateryna Palekha	Germany; Christina Schäfer; Kristina Berger; Elena Richter

=== Compound ===
Event	Gold	Silver	Bronze
Men's individual	Jean-Marc Beaud; France	Dominique Genet; France	Emiel Custers; Netherlands
Women's individual	Camilla Sømod; Denmark	Valérie Fabre; France	Amandine Bouillot; France
Men's team	Denmark; Martin Damsbo; Erik Nielsen; Tom Henriksen	Italy; Stefano Mazzi; Sergio Pagni; Antonio Tosco	France; Jean-Marc Beaud; Sébastien Brasseur; Dominique Genet
Women's team	Russia; Oktyabrina Bolotova; Sofya Goncharova; Anna Kazantseva	Italy; Paola Galletti; Eugenia Salvi; Michela Spangher	Spain; Fátima Agudo; Julia Benito; Teresa Ronco
