= Archery at the 1980 Summer Olympics =

Archery at the Games of the XXII Olympiad
- Venue: Krylatskoye Sports Complex Archery Field
- Dates: 30 July – 2 August 1980
- No. of events: 2 (1 men, 1 women)
- Competitors: 67 from 25 nations

Archery at the 1980 Summer Olympics was held at the archery field, located at the Krylatskoye Olympic Sports Centre (Krylatskoye district, Moscow). The archery schedule began on 30 July and ended on 2 August. Points were in a format called the double FITA round, which included 288 arrows shot over four days at four different distances: 70 meters, 60 meters, 50 meters, 30 meters for women; 90 meters, 70 meters, 50 meters, 30 meters for men.

== Medal summary ==
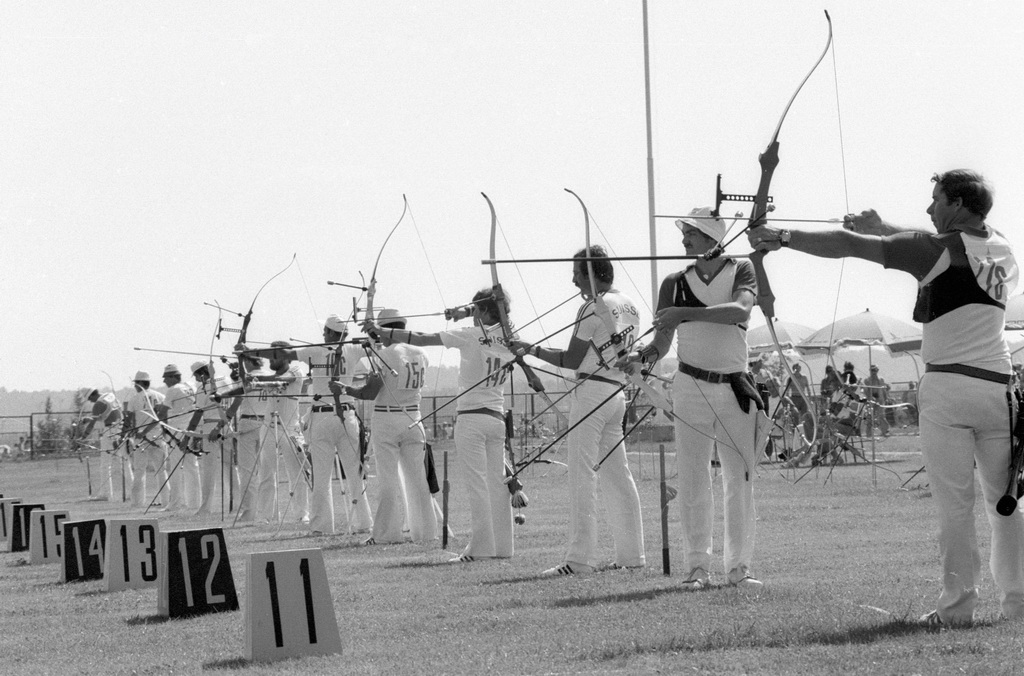
Competitors in the men's individual event.

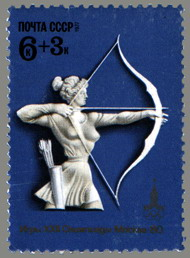
1977 USSR commemorative stamp issued for the event

=== Events ===
Event	Gold	Silver	Bronze
Men's	Tomi Poikolainen; Finland	Boris Isachenko; Soviet Union	Giancarlo Ferrari; Italy
Women's	Keto Losaberidze; Soviet Union	Natalya Butuzova; Soviet Union	Päivi Meriluoto; Finland

=== Medal table ===
Rank	Nation	Gold	Silver	Bronze	Total
1	Soviet Union	1	2	0	3
2	Finland	1	0	1	2
3	Italy	0	0	1	1
Totals (3 entries)		2	2	2	6

== Participating nations ==
Nation	Men's Individual	Women's Individual	Total
Australia	1	2	3
Austria	1	0	1
Belgium	2	0	2
Brazil	1	1	2
Bulgaria	1	1	2
Costa Rica	2	0	2
Czechoslovakia	1	2	3
Finland	2	2	4
Great Britain	2	2	4
Hungary	2	2	4
Ireland	2	1	3
Italy	2	1	3
Luxembourg	1	0	1
Malta	1	1	2
Mongolia	2	2	4
Netherlands	1	1	2
North Korea	1	2	3
Poland	1	2	3
Romania	2	2	4
Soviet Union	2	2	4
Spain	2	0	2
Sweden	2	1	3
Switzerland	2	2	4
Yugoslavia	1	0	1
Zimbabwe	1	0	1
Total athletes	38	29	67
Total NOCs	25	18	25

== See also ==
- Archery at the 1979 Pan American Games
