= Lipponen =

Lipponen is a Finnish surname. Notable people with the surname include:

- Paavo Lipponen (born 1941), Finnish politician and former reporter
- Mika Lipponen (born 1964), Finnish footballer
- Jari Lipponen (born 1979), Finnish archer
