= Mutanen =

Mutanen is a Finnish surname. Notable people with the surname include:

- Anna Mutanen (1914–2003), Finnish opera singer
- Annikka Mutanen (born 1965), Finnish judoka
- Sami Mutanen (born 1984), Finnish ice hockey player
