= Kuligin =

Kuligin (Russian: Кули́гин) is a Russian male surname. Its feminine counterpart is Kuligina. Notable people with the surname include:

- Aleksandr Kuligin (born 1991), Russian Paralympic footballer
- Nataliya Kuligina (born 1971), Kyrgyzstani judoka
