= Ukkola =

Ukkola is a Finnish surname. Notable people with the surname include:

- Pertti Ukkola (born 1950), Finnish wrestler
- Riikka Ukkola (born 1968), Finnish swimmer
- Tuulikki Ukkola (1943–2019), Finnish politician and journalist
