= Dumbrell =

Dumbrell is a surname. Notable people with the surname include:

- George Dumbrell (1906–1990), English footballer
- Paul Dumbrell (born 1982), Australian business executive and racing driver
- Scott Dumbrell (born 1961), Australian archer
- William Dumbrell (1926–2016), Australian biblical scholar
