= František Hadaš =

Czech archer (born 1941)

Personal information
- Nationality: Czech
- Born: 22 March 1941 (age 85) Zlín, Czechoslovakia

Sport
- Sport: Archery

František Hadaš (born 22 March 1941) is a Czech archer. He competed in the men's individual event at the 1980 Summer Olympics.
