= Malcolm Todd (disambiguation) =

Malcolm Todd (born 2003) is an American singer-songwriter and musician.

Malcolm Todd may also refer to:

- Malcolm Todd (album), 2025
- Malcolm Todd (archaeologist) (1939–2013), English archaeologist
- Malcolm Todd (archer) (born 1941), South African archer

== See also ==
- Malcolm Tod (1897–1968), British actor
