= 2000 European Archery Championships =

2000 European Championships
- Location: Antalya, Turkey
- Dates: 15–20 June 2000

The 2000 European Archery Championships is the 16th edition of the European Archery Championships. The event was held in Antalya, Turkey from 15 to 20 June, 2002.

== Medal table ==
* Host nation (Turkey)

Rank	Nation	Gold	Silver	Bronze	Total
1	Turkey	3	0	0	3
2	Netherlands	2	1	0	3
3	Russia	1	1	0	2
4	Great Britain	1	0	3	4
5	Slovenia	1	0	0	1
6	Hungary	0	2	0	2
7	France	0	1	2	3
8	Germany	0	1	1	2
8	Italy	0	1	1	2
10	Spain	0	1	0	1
11	Belarus	0	0	1	1
Totals (11 entries)		8	8	8	24

== Medal summary ==
=== Recurve ===
Event	Gold	Silver	Bronze
Men's individual	Balzynim Cyrempilov; Russia	Ilario Di Buò; Italy	Jocelyn de Grandis; France
Women's individual	Natalia Nasaridze; Turkey	Natalia Bolotova; Russia	Hanna Marusava; Belarus
Men's team	Turkey (TUR); Özdemir Akbal; Hasan Orbay; Serdar Şatır	Netherlands (NED); Henk Vogels; Wietse van Alten; Fred van Zutphen	France (FRA); Sébastien Flute; Lionel Torrés; Jocelyn de Grandis
Women's team	Turkey (TUR); Natalia Nasaridze; Elif Altınkaynak; Zekiye Keskin Şatır	Germany (GER); Britta Buehren; Barbara Kegelmann; Sandra Sachse	Italy (ITA); Natalia Valeeva; Cristina Ioriatti; Irene Franchini

=== Compound ===
Event	Gold	Silver	Bronze
Men's individual	Simon Tarplee; United Kingdom	Tibor Ondrik; Hungary	Michael Peart; United Kingdom
Women's individual	Irma Luyting; Netherlands	Fatima Agudo; Spain	Clarire Treaman; Germany
Men's team	Slovenia (SLO)	Hungary (HUN)	United Kingdom (UK)
Women's team	Netherlands (NED)	France (FRA)	United Kingdom (UK)
