= 1998 European Indoor Archery Championships =

1998 European Indoor Championships
- Location: Oldenburg, Germany
- Dates: 3–7 March 1998

The 1998 European Indoor Archery Championships was the 6th edition of the European Indoor Archery Championships. The event was held in Oldenburg, Germany from 3 to 7 March 1998.

== Medal table ==
* Host nation (Germany)

Rank	Nation	Gold	Silver	Bronze	Total
1	France	3	0	1	4
2	Switzerland	2	0	1	3
3	Italy	1	1	0	2
3	Turkey	1	1	0	2
5	Ukraine	1	0	0	1
6	Great Britain	0	3	1	4
7	Germany*	0	1	1	2
8	Denmark	0	1	0	1
8	Poland	0	1	0	1
10	Spain	0	0	2	2
11	Belgium	0	0	1	1
11	Netherlands	0	0	1	1
Totals (12 entries)		8	8	8	24

== Medal summary ==
=== Recurve ===
Event	Gold	Silver	Bronze
Men's individual	Lionel Torres; France	Matteo Bisiani; Italy	Henk Vogels; Netherlands
Women's individual	Deniz Günay; Turkey	Katarzyna Klata; Poland	Almudena Gallardo; Spain
Men's team	Italy; Matteo Bisiani; Ilario Di Buò; Mario Casavecchia	Germany; Michael Frankenberg; Alexander Fröse; Erich Kloos	Spain; Josep Reche Bastidas; Antonio Vázquez; José Antonio Amador
Women's team	Ukraine; Kateryna Palekha; Olena Sadovnycha; Ilona Babich	Turkey; Natalia Nasaridze; Elif Altınkaynak; Deniz Günay	Germany; Sandra Sachse; Barbara Mensing; Cornelia Pfohl

=== Compound ===
Event	Gold	Silver	Bronze
Men's individual	Dominique Giroud; Switzerland	Michael Peart; Great Britain	Cedric Van Elven; Belgium
Women's individual	Valérie Fabre; France	Nichola Simpson; Great Britain	Sophie Cordier; France
Men's team	Switzerland; Dominique Giroud; David Lopez; Patrizio Hofer	Denmark; Tom Henriksen; Per Knudsen; Niels Baldur	United Kingdom; Michael Peart; Simon Tarplee; Christopher White
Women's team	France; Valérie Fabre; Sophie Cordier; Cécilia Ploquin	United Kingdom; Nichola Simpson; Maryann Richardson; Beverley Taylor	Switzerland; Rita Riedo; Sylviane Lambelet; Karin Probst
