= Berki =

Berki is a surname. Notable people with the surname include:

- Andrei Berki (born 1952), Romanian archer
- István Berki (born 1994), Hungarian footballer
- Krisztián Berki (born 1985), Hungarian artistic gymnast
- Lilla Berki (born 1993), Hungarian weightlifter
- Marcell Berki (born 2004), Hungarian footballer
- Robert Nandor Berki (1936–1991), Hungarian-British political scientist
- Tamás Berki (born 1946), Hungarian musician
