= Joyce Heron (judoka) =

British judoka (born 1964)

Personal information
- Nationality: British
- Born: 28 October 1964 (age 61)

Sport
- Sport: Judo
Medal record
Representing Great Britain
World Championships
Bronze medal – third place	1993 Hamilton	-48kg
European Championships
Bronze medal – third place	1995 Birmingham	-48kg

Joyce Heron (born 28 October 1964) is a British judoka. She competed in the women's extra-lightweight event at the 1996 Summer Olympics.

== Judo career ==
Heron came to prominence in 1992 when she became champion of Great Britain, winning the bantamweight division at the British Judo Championships. She successfully defended her title in 1993 and 1994. In 1993, she won the bronze medal at the 1993 World Judo Championships in Hamilton.

In 1995, she won a bronze medal at the 1995 European Judo Championships in Birmingham. She won a fourth British title in 1996 and was selected to represent Great Britain at the 1996 Olympic Games in Atlanta, competing in the women's 48 kg category she was eliminated by eventual bronze medallist Yolanda Soler. In 1998, she won her fifth and last British Championship.

== Personal life ==
She teaches masterclasses in Judo.
