= Tahvanainen =

Tahvanainen is a Finnish surname. Notable people with the surname include:

- Keijo Tahvanainen, Finnish weightlifter
- Veijo Tahvanainen (born 1938), Finnish orienteering competitor
- Timo Tahvanainen (born 1986), Finnish footballer
