= Mongolia at the 1976 Summer Olympics =

- IOC code: MGL
- NOC: Mongolian National Olympic Committee

in Montreal
- Competitors: 33 in 6 sports
- Flag bearer: Zevegiin Oidov
- Medals Ranked 34th: Gold 0 Silver 1 Bronze 0 Total 1

Summer Olympics appearances (overview)
- 1964; 1968; 1972; 1976; 1980; 1984; 1988; 1992; 1996; 2000; 2004; 2008; 2012; 2016; 2020; 2024

Mongolia competed at the 1976 Summer Olympics in Montreal, Quebec, Canada.

== Results by event ==
=== Archery ===
In the second time they competed in archery at the Olympics, Mongolia entered two men and two women. Their highest placing competitor was again Natjav Dariimaa, this time at 22nd place in the women's competition. Dariimaa was the only Olympic veteran for Mongolia in 1976.

Women's Individual Competition:

- Natjav Dariimaa (Note: also competed at the 1972 Summer Olympics) — 2209 points (→ 22nd place)
- Gombosure Enkhtaivan — 2156 points (→ 24th place)

Men's Individual Competition:

- Niamtseren Biambasuren — 2256 points (→ 28th place)
- Tserendorjin Dagvadorj — 2179 points (→ 32nd place)

=== Boxing ===
Men's Light Flyweight (– 48 kg)

- Serdambyn Batsükh (otherwise Serdamba Batsuk)
  1. First Round — Defeated Enrique Rodríguez (ESP), RSC-3
  2. Second Round — Lost to György Gedó (HUN), 0:5

Men's Light Middleweight (– 71 kg)

- Dashnyamyn Olzvoi
  1. First Round — Lost to Rolando Garbey (CUB), KO-3

=== Wrestling ===
Men's Freestyle (– 62 kg)

- Zevegiin Oidov — Won the silver medal.
