= Im Hui-sik =

South Korean archer

Personal information
- Nationality: South Korean
- Born: 24 February 1968 (age 57)

Sport
- Sport: Archery

Im Hui-sik (born 24 February 1968) is a South Korean archer. He competed in the men's individual and team events at the 1992 Summer Olympics.

He set an unofficial Korean record in 1987.
