= Jorge Murillo (archer) =

Costa Rican archer (born 1939)

Personal information
- Born: 15 November 1939 (age 86) San José, Costa Rica

Sport
- Sport: Archery

Jorge Murillo (born 15 November 1939) is a Costa Rican former archer. He competed in the men's individual event at the 1980 Summer Olympics.
