= Wijit Suksompong =

Thai archer

Personal information
- Nationality: Thai
- Born: 19 May 1946 (age 78)

Sport
- Sport: Archery

Wijit Suksompong (born 19 May 1946) is a Thai archer. He competed in the men's individual event at the 1976 Summer Olympics.
