= Martin Hámor =

Slovak archer (1943–2023)

Personal information
- Nationality: Slovak
- Born: 9 April 1943; Kalinovo, Czechoslovakia
- Died: 11 September 2023 (aged 80); Kostelec na Hané, Czech Republic

Sport
- Sport: Archery

Martin Hámor (9 March 1943 – 11 September 2023) was a Slovak archer. He competed in the men's individual event at the 1992 Summer Olympics.
