= 2000 European Indoor Archery Championships =

2000 European Indoor Championships
- Location: Spała, Poland
- Dates: 1–5 March 2000

The 2000 European Indoor Archery Championships was the 7th edition of the European Indoor Archery Championships. The event was held in Spała, Poland from 1 to 5 March 2000.

== Medal table ==
* Host nation (Poland)

Rank	Nation	Gold	Silver	Bronze	Total
1	France	3	2	1	6
2	Turkey	2	0	1	3
3	Great Britain	1	1	1	3
4	Italy	1	0	1	2
5	Poland*	1	0	0	1
6	Denmark	0	1	2	3
7	Switzerland	0	1	1	2
8	Germany	0	1	0	1
8	Netherlands	0	1	0	1
8	Ukraine	0	1	0	1
11	Russia	0	0	1	1
Totals (11 entries)		8	8	8	24

== Medal summary ==
=== Recurve ===
Event	Gold	Silver	Bronze
Men's individual	Hasan Orbay; Turkey	Wietse van Alten; Netherlands	Michele Frangilli; Italy
Women's individual	Natalia Nasaridze; Turkey	Kateryna Palekha; Ukraine	Aurore Trayan; France
Men's team	Italy; Michele Frangilli; Matteo Bisiani; Andrea Parenti	Germany; Christian Stubbe; Michael Frankenberg; Erich Kloos	Turkey; Hasan Orbay; Okyay Küçükkayalar; Özdemir Akbal
Women's team	Poland; Anna Łęcka; Barbara Węgrzynowska; Agata Bulwa	France; Alexandra Fouace; Aurore Trayan; Céline Mignon	Russia; Nadezhda Badmazirenova; Rita Galinovskaya; Yelena Gracheva

=== Compound ===
Event	Gold	Silver	Bronze
Men's individual	Jean-Marc Beaud; France	Jonathan Mynott; Great Britain	Niels Baldur; Denmark
Women's individual	Catherine Pellen; France	Valérie Fabre; France	Maryann Richardson; Great Britain
Men's team	United Kingdom; Michael Peart; Simon Tarplee; Jonathan Mynott	Switzerland; Simon Frankhauser; David Lopez; Boris Fornera	Denmark; Niels Baldur; Per Knudsen; Tom Henriksen
Women's team	France; Catherine Pellen; Valérie Fabre; Sandrine Vandionant-Frangilli	Denmark; Lene Ahrenfeldt; Louise Hauge; Camilla Sømod	Switzerland; Rita Riedo; Sylviane Lambelet; Karin Probst
