= Edward Gamble =

Canadian archer (1935–2016)

Personal information
- Nationality: Canadian
- Born: 18 September 1935 Leicester, England
- Died: 31 December 2016 (aged 81) Alberta, Canada

Sport
- Sport: Archery

Edward Gamble (18 September 1935 – 31 December 2016) was a Canadian archer. He competed in the men's individual event at the 1976 Summer Olympics.
