= Berny Camps =

Dutch archer (born 1971)

Personal information
- Nationality: Dutch
- Born: 20 March 1971 (age 54); Venray, Netherlands

Sport
- Sport: Archery

Berny Camps (born 20 March 1971) is a Dutch archer. He competed in the men's individual and team events at the 1992 Summer Olympics.
