= Kerstin Emich =

German judoka

Personal information
- Nationality: German
- Born: 14 December 1962 (age 63) Rüsselsheim, Germany
- Occupation: Judoka

Sport
- Sport: Judo

Kerstin Emich (born 14 December 1962) is a German former judoka. She competed in the women's extra-lightweight event at the 1992 Summer Olympics.
