= Huang Yu-hsin =

Taiwanese judoka (born 1971)

Personal information
- Full name: 黃玉欣, Pinyin: Huáng Yù-xīn
- Nationality: Taiwanese
- Born: 26 November 1971 (age 53)

Sport
- Sport: Judo

Huang Yu-hsin (born 26 November 1971) is a Taiwanese judoka. She competed in the women's extra-lightweight event at the 1992 Summer Olympics.
