= Luis González (archer) =

Costa Rican archer (born 1945)

Personal information
- Born: 19 November 1945 (age 79); San José, Costa Rica

Sport
- Sport: Archery

Luis González (born 19 November 1945) is a Costa Rican archer. He competed in the men's individual event at the 1976 Summer Olympics.
