= Jacek Gilewski =

Polish archer (born 1969)

Personal information
- Nationality: Polish
- Born: 25 January 1969 (age 56); Warsaw, Poland

Sport
- Sport: Archery

Jacek Gilewski (born 25 January 1969) is a Polish archer. He competed in the men's individual and team events at the 1992 Summer Olympics.
