= Dave Mann (archer) =

Canadian archer (born 1957)

Personal information
- Nationality: Canadian
- Born: 1 February 1957 (age 69) Vancouver, British Columbia, Canada

Sport
- Sport: Archery

Dave Mann (born 1 February 1957) is a Canadian archer. He competed in the men's individual event at the 1976 Summer Olympics.
