= Takanobu Nishi =

Japanese archer (born 1951)

Personal information
- Nationality: Japanese
- Born: 12 March 1951 (age 75)

Sport
- Sport: Archery

Takanobu Nishi (西孝収, Nishi Takanobu; born 12 March 1951) is a Japanese archer. He competed in the men's individual event at the 1976 Summer Olympics.
