= Grant Greenham =

Australian archer (1954–2018)

Personal information
- Nationality: Australian
- Born: 20 July 1954; Perth, Western Australia
- Died: 27 August 2018 (aged 64)

Sport
- Sport: Archery

Grant Greenham (20 July 1954 – 27 August 2018) was an Australian archer. He competed in the men's individual and team events at the 1992 Summer Olympics.
