= Ivan Ivanov (archer) =

Bulgarian archer (born 1956)

Personal information
- Nationality: Bulgarian
- Born: 10 June 1956 (age 68)

Sport
- Sport: Archery

Ivan Ivanov (Bulgarian: Иван Иванов; born 10 June 1956) is a Bulgarian archer. He competed in the men's individual event at the 1992 Summer Olympics.
