= Mihai Bîrzu =

Romanian archer (1955–1998)

Personal information
- Full name: Mihai Doru Bîrzu
- Nationality: Romanian
- Born: 26 May 1955
- Died: 1998 (aged 42–43)
- Height: 173 cm (5 ft 8 in)
- Weight: 62 kg (137 lb)

Sport
- Sport: Archery

Mihai Doru Bîrzu (26 May 1955 – 1998) was a Romanian archer. He competed in the men's individual event at the 1980 Summer Olympics.
