= Martinus Grov =

Norwegian archer (born 1974)

Bertil Martinus Grov
- Born: November 3, 1974 (age 51); Førde, Norway
- Occupation: athlete

Bertil Martinus Grov (born November 3, 1974, in Førde) is a retired archer from Norway.

He finished fourth in the individual event at the 1992 Olympic Games, fifteenth at the 1996 Olympic Games and 41st at the 2000 Olympic Games. He also finished fourth at the 1991 World Indoor Championships. He became Norwegian champion 14 times, and Nordic champion in 1995.

He returned to competition in 2019, winning a gold at the NM competition in April 2019. His partner Wenche-Lin Hess won silver at the same competition.
