= Oswald Probst =

Austrian archer (1935–2015)

Personal information
- Nationality: Austrian
- Born: 9 July 1935; Vienna, Austria
- Died: 15 July 2015 (aged 80)

Sport
- Sport: Archery

Oswald Probst (9 July 1935 – 15 July 2015) was an Austrian archer. He competed in the men's individual event at the 1976 Summer Olympics.
