= Hiroshi Michinaga =

Japanese archer (born 1956)

Medal record

Men's Archery

Representing Japan

Olympic Games
Silver medal – second place	1976 Montreal	Individual

Hiroshi Michinaga (道永 宏, Michinaga Hiroshi) (born 8 October 1956) is an archer from Japan, who was born in Hyogo, Japan.

He competed for Japan in the 1976 Summer Olympics held in Montreal, Quebec, Canada in the individual event where he finished in second place behind American Darrell Pace .
