= Kiyokazu Nishikawa =

Japanese archer (born 1972)

Personal information
- Nationality: Japanese
- Born: 10 November 1972 (age 52); Fukuoka, Japan

Sport
- Sport: Archery

Kiyokazu Nishikawa (西川清一, Nishikawa Kiyokazu, born 10 November 1972) is a Japanese archer. He competed in the men's individual and team events at the 1992 Summer Olympics.
