= Willi Gabriel (archer) =

German archer (born 1939)

Personal information
- Nationality: German
- Born: 24 September 1939 (age 85); Owiesno, Poland

Sport
- Sport: Archery

Willi Gabriel (born 24 September 1939) is a German archer. He competed in the men's individual event at the 1976 Summer Olympics.
