= Stewart Littlefair =

British archer (born 1946)

Personal information
- Nationality: British
- Born: 9 July 1946 (age 79) Edmonton, England

Sport
- Sport: Archery

Stewart Littlefair (born 9 July 1946) is a British archer. He competed in the men's individual event at the 1976 Summer Olympics.
