= Hendra Setijawan =

Indonesian archer (born 1970)

Personal information
- Nationality: Indonesian
- Born: 28 April 1970 (age 56)

Sport
- Sport: Archery

Hendra Setijawan (born 28 April 1970) is an Indonesian archer. He competed in the men's individual event at the 1992 Summer Olympics.
