= Tamara Meijer =

Dutch judoka

Personal information
- Nationality: Dutch
- Born: 5 July 1979 (age 47) Zoetermeer, Netherlands

Sport
- Sport: Judo

Tamara Meijer (born 5 July 1979) is a Dutch judoka. She competed in the women's extra-lightweight event at the 1996 Summer Olympics.
