= Brigitte Lastrade =

Canadian judoka (born 1972)

Personal information
- Born: 31 May 1972 (age 54) Montreal, Quebec, Canada
- Occupation: Judoka

Sport
- Sport: Judo
Medal record
Representing Canada
Pan American Games
Bronze medal – third place	1991 Havana	Extra-lightweight
Bronze medal – third place	1999 Winnipeg	Lightweight

Profile at external databases
- JudoInside.com: 828

Brigitte Jeanne Lastrade (born 31 May 1972) is a Canadian judoka. She competed in the women's extra-lightweight event at the 1992 Summer Olympics.

== See also ==
- Judo in Canada
- List of Canadian judoka
