= Patrick Jopp =

Swiss archer (born 1962)

Patrik Jopp
Personal information
- Nationality: Swiss
- Born: 8 January 1962 (age 63); Genève

Sport
- Sport: Archery

Patrick Jopp (born 8 January 1962) is a Swiss archer. He competed in the men's individual event at the 1980 Summer Olympics.
