= Fung Yik =

Hong Kong archer

Personal information
- Nationality: Hong Konger
- Born: 3 December 1959 (age 65)

Sport
- Sport: Archery

Fung Yik (born 3 December 1959) is a Hong Kong archer. He competed in the men's individual event at the 1992 Summer Olympics.
