= Yu Hui-jun =

South Korean judoka

Personal information
- Nationality: South Korean
- Born: 5 April 1973 (age 51)

Sport
- Sport: Judo

Yu Hui-jun (born 5 April 1973) is a South Korean judoka. She competed in the women's extra-lightweight event at the 1992 Summer Olympics.
