= Jan Rytter =

Danish archer (born 1973)

Personal information
- Nationality: Danish
- Born: 5 September 1973 (age 51); Aalborg, Denmark

Sport
- Sport: Archery

Jan Rytter (born 5 September 1973) is a Danish archer. He competed in the men's individual and team events at the 1992 Summer Olympics.
