= Vítor Krieger =

Brazilian archer (born 1960)

Personal information
- Nationality: Brazilian
- Born: 30 April 1960 (age 64)

Sport
- Sport: Archery

Vítor Krieger (born 30 April 1960) is a Brazilian archer. He competed in the men's individual event at the 1992 Summer Olympics.
