= Simon Simonis =

Cypriot archer (born 1966)

Personal information
- Nationality: Cypriot
- Born: 23 July 1966 (age 58)

Sport
- Sport: Archery

Simon Simonis (born 23 July 1966) is a Cypriot archer. He competed in the men's individual event at the 1992 Summer Olympics.
