= Frank Marzoch =

German archer (born 1965)

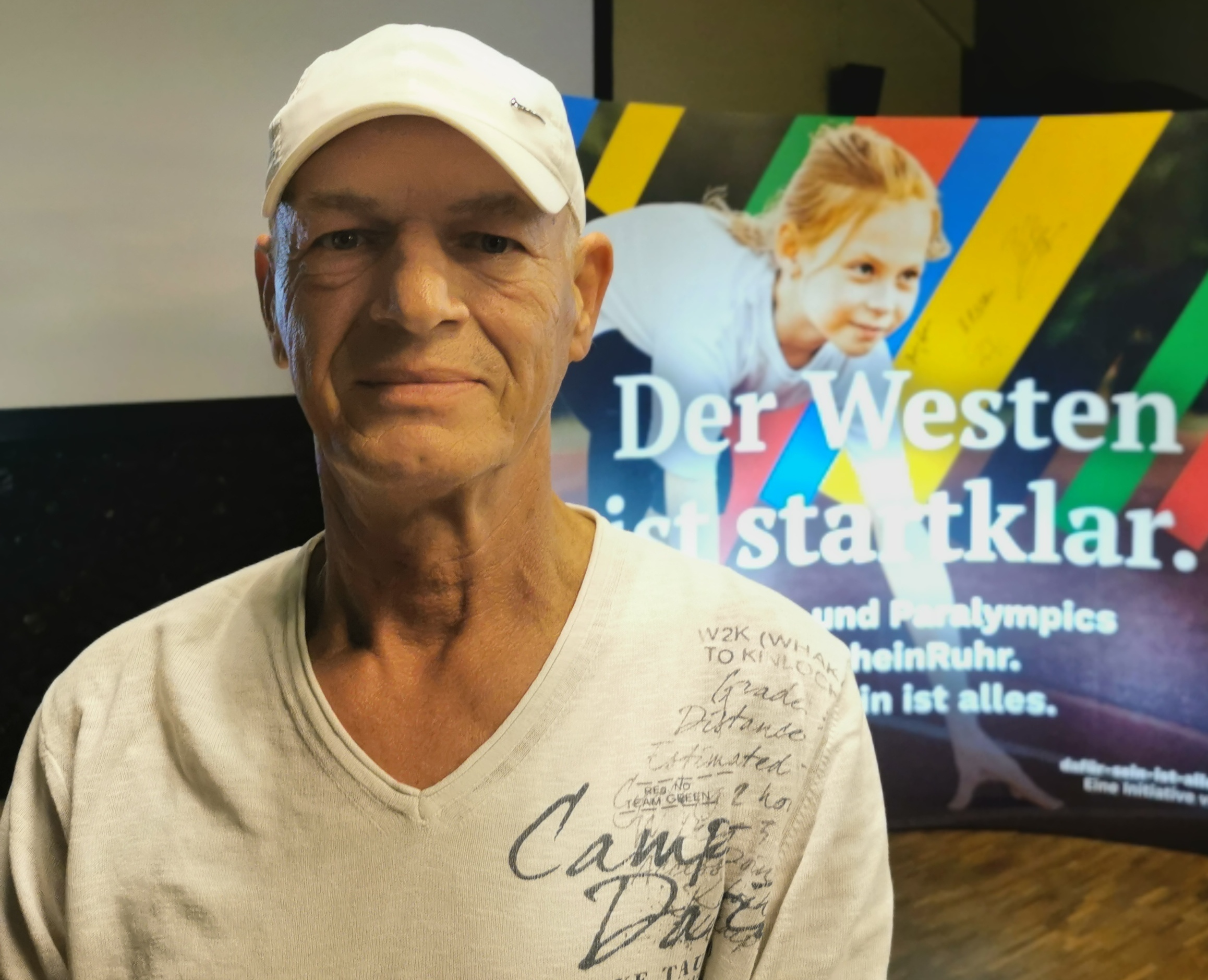
- Frank Marzoch (2026)

Personal information
- Nationality: German
- Born: 22 October 1965 (age 60) Herne, West Germany

Sport
- Sport: Archery

Frank Marzoch (born 22 October 1965) is a German former archer. He competed in the men's individual and team events at the 1992 Summer Olympics.
