= Leposava Marković =

Serbian judoka (born 1973)

Personal information
- Nationality: Serbian
- Born: 20 May 1973 (age 51); Pančevo, SR Serbia, SFR Yugoslavia

Sport
- Sport: Judo

Leposava Marković (Serbian Cyrillic: Лепосава Марковић; born 20 May 1973) is a Serbian judoka. She competed in the women's extra-lightweight event at the 1992 Summer Olympics.
