= Vladimir Chendarov =

Soviet archer (born 1956)

Personal information
- Nationality: Soviet
- Born: 21 February 1956 (age 70)

Sport
- Sport: Archery

Vladimir Chendarov (born 21 February 1956) is a Soviet archer. He competed in the men's individual event at the 1976 Summer Olympics. He was a USSR national champion and record-holder.
