= Romeo Frigo =

Swiss archer (born 1946)

Personal information
- Nationality: Swiss
- Born: 28 July 1946
- Died: 3 December 2021 (aged 75)

Sport
- Sport: Archery

Romeo Frigo (28 July 1946 – 3 December 2021) was a Swiss archer. He competed in the men's individual event at the 1980 Summer Olympics.
