= William Swords =

Irish archer (1942–2007)

Personal information
- Nationality: Irish
- Born: 21 July 1942
- Died: 19 October 2007 (aged 65); Kildare, Ireland

Sport
- Sport: Archery

William Swords (21 July 1942 – 19 October 2007) was an Irish archer. He competed in the men's individual event at the 1980 Summer Olympics.
