= Sylvain Cadieux =

Canadian archer (born 1974)

Personal information
- Born: 25 September 1974 (age 52) Terrebonne, Quebec, Canada

Sport
- Sport: Archery

Sylvain Cadieux (born 25 September 1974) is a Canadian archer. He competed in the men's individual and team events at the 1992 Summer Olympics.
