= Wojciech Szymańczyk =

Polish archer (1943–1996)

Personal information
- Nationality: Polish
- Born: 19 February 1943 Poznań, Poland
- Died: 22 November 1996 (aged 53) Poznań, Poland

Sport
- Sport: Archery

Achievements and titles
- Olympic finals: 1976 Summer Olympics

Wojciech Szymańczyk (19 February 1943 – 22 November 1996) was a Polish archer. He competed in the men's individual event at the 1976 Summer Olympics.
