= Bojan Postružnik =

Slovenian archer (1952–1989)

Personal information
- Nationality: Slovenian
- Born: 31 May 1952 Maribor, Yugoslavia
- Died: 23 April 1989 (aged 36)

Sport
- Sport: Archery

Bojan Postružnik (31 May 1952 – 23 April 1989) was a Slovenian archer. He won 9th place in the men's individual event at the 1976 Summer Olympics.
