= István Balázs (archer) =

Hungarian archer (born 1952)

Personal information
- Nationality: Hungarian
- Born: 15 February 1952 (age 73); Esztergom, Hungary

Sport
- Sport: Archery

István Balázs (born 15 February 1952) is a Hungarian archer. He competed in the men's individual event at the 1980 Summer Olympics.
