= Rudolf Schiffl =

German archer (1941–2013)

Personal information
- Nationality: German
- Born: 18 August 1941 Dachau, Germany
- Died: 8 March 2013 (aged 71) Dachau, Germany

Sport
- Sport: Archery

Rudolf Schiffl (18 August 1941 – 8 March 2013) was a German archer. He competed in the men's individual event at the 1976 Summer Olympics.
