= David Milne (archer) =

Zimbabwean archer (born 1939)

Personal information
- Nationality: Zimbabwean
- Born: 29 January 1939 (age 86)

Sport
- Sport: Archery

David Campbell Milne (born 29 January 1939) is a Zimbabwean archer. He competed in the men's individual event at the 1980 Summer Olympics.
