= Vallop Potaya =

Thai archer

Personal information
- Nationality: Thai
- Born: 1 April 1942 (age 83)

Sport
- Sport: Archery

Vallop Potaya (born 1 April 1942) is a Thai archer. He competed in the men's individual event at the 1976 Summer Olympics.
