= David Pink =

British archer (born 1939)

Personal information
- Nationality: British
- Born: 13 December 1939 (age 85); Southend-on-Sea, England

Sport
- Sport: Archery

David Pink (born 13 December 1939) is a British archer. He competed in the men's individual event at the 1976 Summer Olympics.
