= Kim Gye-jong =

North Korean archer (born 1956)

Personal information
- Nationality: North Korean
- Born: 27 July 1956 (age 69)

Sport
- Sport: Archery

Kim Gye-jong (born 27 July 1956) is a North Korean archer. He competed in the men's individual event at the 1980 Summer Olympics.
