= Zoran Matković =

Croatian archer (born 1961)

Personal information
- Nationality: Croatian
- Born: 18 October 1961 (age 63); Varaždin, Yugoslavia

Sport
- Sport: Archery

Zoran Matković (born 18 October 1961) is a Croatian archer. He competed in the men's individual event at the 1980 Summer Olympics.
