= Dhulchand Damor =

Indian archer (born 1964)

Personal information
- Nationality: Indian
- Born: 8 August 1964 (age 60)

Sport
- Sport: Archery

Dhulchand Damor (born 8 August 1964) is an Indian archer. He competed in the men's individual and team events at the 1992 Summer Olympics.
