= Marc Rösicke =

German archer (born 1971)

Personal information
- Nationality: German
- Born: 13 May 1971 (age 53); Soest, West Germany

Sport
- Sport: Archery

Marc Rösicke (born 13 May 1971) is a German former archer. He competed in the men's individual and team events at the 1992 Summer Olympics.
