= Kang Yong-ok =

North Korean judoka (born 1974)

Personal information
- Nationality: North Korean
- Born: 19 February 1974 (age 51)

Sport
- Sport: Judo

Kang Yong-ok (born 19 February 1974) is a North Korean judoka. She competed in the women's extra-lightweight event at the 1992 Summer Olympics.
