= Pierre Blacks =

Belgian archer (born 1948)

Personal information
- Nationality: Belgian
- Born: 20 October 1948 (age 76); Ixelles, Belgium

Sport
- Sport: Archery

Pierre Blacks (born 20 October 1948) is a Belgian archer. He competed in the men's individual event at the 1976 Summer Olympics.
