= Liang Qiang =

Chinese archer (born 1973)

Personal information
- Nationality: Chinese
- Born: 7 April 1973 (age 51)

Sport
- Sport: Archery

Liang Qiang (born 7 April 1973) is a Chinese archer. He competed in the men's individual and team events at the 1992 Summer Olympics.
