= Luis Cabral (archer) =

Guamanian archer (born 1960)

Personal information
- Nationality: Guamanian
- Born: 8 July 1960 (age 64)

Sport
- Sport: Archery

Luis Cabral (born 8 July 1960) is a Guamanian archer. He competed in the men's individual event at the 1992 Summer Olympics.
