= Naoto Oku =

Japanese archer (born 1971)

Personal information
- Nationality: Japanese
- Born: 16 October 1971 (age 53); Kanagawa, Japan

Sport
- Sport: Archery

Naoto Oku (於久直人, Oku Naoto, born 16 October 1971) is a Japanese archer. He competed in the men's individual and team events at the 1992 Summer Olympics.
