= Hao Wei (archer) =

Chinese archer (born 1968)

Personal information
- Nationality: Chinese
- Born: 30 October 1968 (age 56)

Sport
- Sport: Archery

Hao Wei (simplified Chinese: 郝伟; traditional Chinese: 郝偉; pinyin: Hǎo Wěi, born 30 October 1968) is a Chinese archer. He competed in the men's individual and team events at the 1992 Summer Olympics. He is from Qingdao.
