= Dennis Savory =

British archer (born 1943)

Personal information
- Nationality: British
- Born: 13 June 1943 (age 81); Kettering, England

Sport
- Sport: Archery

Dennis Savory (born 13 June 1943) is a British archer. He competed in the men's individual event at the 1980 Summer Olympics.

== Early life ==
He was a carpenter from Wisbech, he lived at 32 Eighth Avenue, with his wife Betty.
