= Tina Kirkman =

Australian judoka

Personal information
- Born: Tina Wood; 23 December 1969 (age 56) Liverpool, New South Wales, Australia
- Occupation: Judoka

Sport
- Country: Australia
- Sport: Judo
- Weight class: ‍–‍48 kg, ‍–‍52 kg

Achievements and titles
- Olympic Games: R32 (1996)
- World Champ.: R32 (1993, 1995)
- Oceania Champ.: (gold) (1990, 1994, 1996)
Medal record
Women's judo
Representing Australia
Oceania Championships
Gold medal – first place	1990 Papeete	‍–‍48 kg
Gold medal – first place	1994 Sydney	‍–‍48 kg
Gold medal – first place	1996 Wellington	‍–‍48 kg
Silver medal – second place	1992 Wellington	‍–‍48 kg

Profile at external databases
- IJF: 53259
- JudoInside.com: 62949, 10846
- Updated on 20 September 2025

Tina Kirkman (née Wood; born 23 December 1969) is an Australian judoka. She competed in the women's extra-lightweight event at the 1996 Summer Olympics.
