= Ricardo Rojas (archer) =

Mexican archer (born 1959)

Personal information
- Nationality: Mexican
- Born: 4 April 1959 (age 66)

Sport
- Sport: Archery

Ricardo Rojas (born 4 April 1959) is a Mexican archer. He competed in the men's individual and team events at the 1992 Summer Olympics.
