= Petko Kichev =

Bulgarian archer (born 1950)

Personal information
- Nationality: Bulgarian
- Born: 9 June 1950 (age 74)

Sport
- Sport: Archery

Petko Kichev (Bulgarian: Петко Кичев; born 9 June 1950) is a Bulgarian archer. He competed in the men's individual event at the 1980 Summer Olympics.
