= Scott Dumbrell =

Australian archer (born 1961)

Personal information
- Nationality: Australian
- Born: 3 February 1961 (age 65)

Sport
- Sport: Archery

Scott Dumbrell (born 3 February 1961) is an Australian archer. He competed in the men's individual event at the 1980 Summer Olympics.
