= María Villapol =

Venezuelan judoka (born 1967)

Personal information
- Born: November 16, 1967 (age 58)
Medal record
Women's Judo
Representing Venezuela
Pan American Games
Bronze medal – third place	1983 Caracas	Extra-Lightweight
Bronze medal – third place	1991 Havana	Flyweight
Bronze medal – third place	1995 Mar del Plata	Extra-Lightweight

María Elena Villapol Blanca (born November 16, 1967) is a retired female judoka from Venezuela. She competed for her native South American country at the 1992 Summer Olympics, where she was eliminated in the quarterfinals of the Women's Extra-Lightweight (– 48 kg) division. Villapol claimed a total number of three bronze medals during her career at the Pan American Games.
