= Michaela Bornemann =

Austrian judoka

Personal information
- Nationality: Austrian
- Born: 17 March 1971 (age 54); Graz, Austria
- Occupation: Judoka
- Website: bornemann.at

Sport
- Sport: Judo

Profile at external databases
- IJF: 53735
- JudoInside.com: 3189

Michaela Bornemann (born 17 March 1971) is an Austrian judoka. She competed in the women's extra-lightweight event at the 1992 Summer Olympics.
