= Jan Popowicz =

Polish archer (born 1948)

Personal information
- Nationality: Polish
- Born: 5 January 1948 (age 77); Rzeszów, Poland

Sport
- Sport: Archery

Jan Popowicz (born 5 January 1948) is a Polish archer. He competed in the men's individual event at the 1976 Summer Olympics.
