= Michaël Taupin =

French archer (born 1972)

Personal information
- Nationality: French
- Born: 12 March 1972 (age 53); Champigny-sur-Marne, France

Sport
- Sport: Archery

Michaël Taupin (born 12 March 1972) is a French archer. He competed in the men's individual event at the 1992 Summer Olympics.
