= Claude Rousseau =

Canadian archer (born 1953)

Personal information
- Born: 16 June 1953 (age 73) Saint-Nicolas, Quebec, Canada

Sport
- Sport: Archery

Claude Rousseau (born 16 June 1953) is a Canadian archer. He competed in the men's individual and team events at the 1992 Summer Olympics.
