= Malcolm Todd (archer) =

South African archer (born 1941)

Personal information
- Nationality: South African
- Born: 13 December 1941 (age 83)

Sport
- Sport: Archery

Malcolm Todd (born 13 December 1941) is a South African archer. He competed in the men's individual event at the 1992 Summer Olympics.

He is currently the chairperson of Bellville Archery Club in Cape Town, South Africa and is accredited to be a coach by the South African National Archery Association (SANAA).

Being somewhat of an icon in South African archery, he is very well known and even has a SANAA sanctioned tournament named after him, the Malcolm Todd Tournament, which is based on the World Archery 1440 Round.
