= Erwin Verstegen =

Dutch archer (1970–1995)

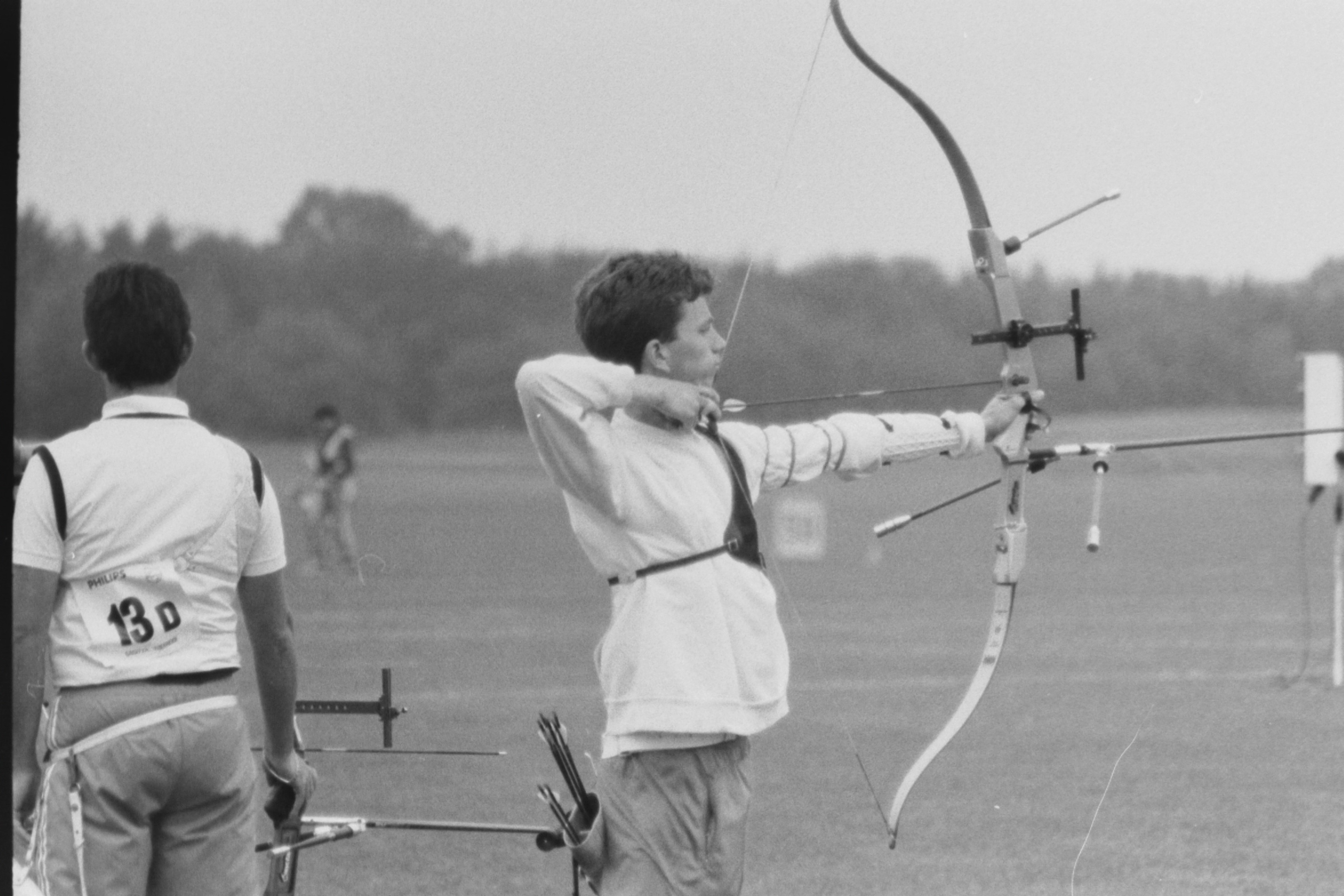

Personal information
- Nationality: Dutch
- Born: 31 July 1970; Veghel, Netherlands
- Died: 5 March 1995 (aged 24); Veghel, Netherlands

Sport
- Sport: Archery

Erwin Verstegen (31 July 1970 – 5 March 1995) was a Dutch archer. He competed in the men's individual and team events at the 1992 Summer Olympics.
