= Anne Lackman =

Finnish swimmer

Personal information
- Born: 13 September 1969 (age 56) Lieksa, Finland

Sport
- Sport: Swimming

Anne Lackman (born 13 September 1969) is a Finnish former backstroke swimmer.

== Career ==
She competed in two events at the 1992 Summer Olympics.
