= Jari Pälve =

Finnish sports shooter

Personal information
- Nationality: Finnish
- Born: 12 May 1965 (age 59); Oulu, Finland

Sport
- Sport: Sports shooting

Jari Pälve (born 12 May 1965) is a Finnish sports shooter. He competed in three events at the 1992 Summer Olympics.
