= Yu Shu-chen =

Taiwanese judoka (born 1980)

Personal information
- Nationality: Taiwanese
- Born: 25 January 1980 (age 46)

Sport
- Sport: Judo

Yu Shu-chen (born 25 January 1980) is a Taiwanese judoka. She competed in the women's extra-lightweight event at the 1996 Summer Olympics.
