= Hülya Şenyurt =

Turkish judoka

Personal information
- Born: 10 November 1973 (age 52) Ordu, Turkey
- Occupation: Judoka

Sport
- Country: Turkey
- Sport: Judo
- Weight class: ‍–‍48 kg

Achievements and titles
- Olympic Games: (bronze) (1992)
- World Champ.: R16 (1995)
- European Champ.: (bronze) (1993)
Medal record
Women's judo
Representing Turkey
Olympic Games
Bronze medal – third place	1992 Barcelona	‍–‍48 kg
European Championships
Bronze medal – third place	1993 Athens	‍–‍48 kg
European Junior Championships
Silver medal – second place	1991 Pieksämäki	‍–‍48 kg
Bronze medal – third place	1990 Ankara	‍–‍48 kg

Profile at external databases
- IJF: 13782
- JudoInside.com: 3544
- Updated on 5 June 2023

Hülya Şenyurt (born 10 November 1973 in Ordu) is a Turkish female judoka. She won a bronze medal in Judo (women's under 48 kg) in the 1992 Summer Olympics. She became Turkey's first female and youngest Olympic medalist.

Between 1989 and 1992, Hülya Şenyurt was successful at the Balkan and European Junior Judo Championships.

== Achievements ==
- 1989 Balkan Juniors Judo Championships in İzmir, Turkey – bronze
- 1990 European Juniors Judo Championships in İzmir, Turkey – gold
- 1991 European Juniors Judo Championships – silver
- 1992 Summer Olympics in Barcelona, Spain – bronze
