= Tomoe Makabe =

Japanese judoka (born 1974)

Medal record

Women's Judo

Representing Japan

Asian Games
Gold medal – first place	1998 Bangkok	-48 kg

Asian Championships
Silver medal – second place	1999 Wenzhou	-48 kg

Tomoe Makabe (真壁 友枝, Makabe Tomoe; born 28 November 1974) is a retired Japanese judoka.

== Career ==
Makabe was born in Shōō, Okayama, and began judo at the age of a 2nd grader. She entered the Sumitomo Marine & Fire Insurance after graduating from high-school in 1993.

In 1998, she participated in the Asian Games held in Bangkok and won a gold medal. In 1999, she also participated in the Asian Championships held in Wenzhou.

Makabe retired when she was defeated by Kayo Kitada due to her misjudgment at the semi-final of All-Japan Selected Championships in 2003.

As of 2010, Makabe coaches judo at Mitsui Sumitomo Insurance Group judo club which she belonged to once.

== Achievements ==
- 1992 - All-Japan High School Championships (-48 kg) 1st
- 1994 - All-Japan Businessgroup Championships (-48 kg) 3rd
- 1995 - All-Japan Businessgroup Championships (-48 kg) 2nd
- 1996 - All-Japan Selected Championships (-48 kg) 3rd

- All-Japan Businessgroup Championships (-48 kg) 1st

- 1997 - All-Japan Selected Championships (-48 kg) 3rd

- All-Japan Businessgroup Championships (-48 kg) 1st

- 1998 - Asian Games (-48 kg) 1st

- All-Japan Selected Championships (-48 kg) 2nd

- 1999 - Asian Championships (-48 kg) 2nd

- Fukuoka International Women's Championships (-48 kg) 2nd
- Fukuoka International Women's Championships (-48 kg) 3rd
- All-Japan Selected Championships (-48 kg) 3rd
- All-Japan Businessgroup Championships (-48 kg) 1st

- 2000 - All-Japan Businessgroup Championships (-48 kg) 1st
- 2001 - Fukuoka International Women's Championships (-48 kg) 2nd

- All-Japan Selected Championships (-48 kg) 3rd

- 2002 - Fukuoka International Women's Championships (-48 kg) 3rd

- All-Japan Selected Championships (-48 kg) 1st

- 2003 - All-Japan Selected Championships (-48 kg) 3rd
