= Päivi Meriluoto =

Finnish archer (born 1952)

Päivi Aaltonen
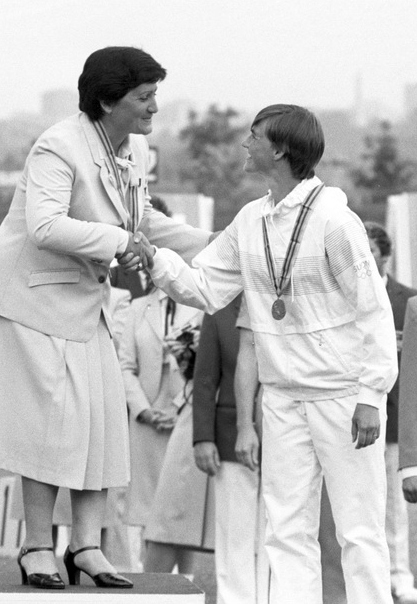
- Meriluoto (right) at the 1980 Olympics

Personal information
- Born: Päivi Aulikki Meriluoto; 12 December 1952 (age 73) Tampere, Finland
- Height: 171 cm (5 ft 7 in)
- Weight: 61 kg (134 lb)

Sport
- Sport: Archery
- Club: Arcus, Turku
Medal record
Representing Finland
Olympic Games
Bronze medal – third place	1980 Moscow	Individual
European Archery Championships
Bronze medal – third place	1978 Stoneleigh	Team, outdoor
Silver medal – second place	1980 Compiègne	Team, outdoor
Silver medal – second place	1982 Kecskemét	Team, outdoor
Silver medal – second place	1982 Kecskemét	Individual, outdoor
Silver medal – second place	1983 Falun	Team, indoor
Bronze medal – third place	1985 Odense	Team, indoor

Päivi Aulikki Aaltonen (née Meriluoto; born 12 December 1952) is a retired Finnish archer. She competed at the 1980, 1984 and 1988 Olympics and won an individual bronze medal in 1980. Between 1978 and 1985 she won four silver and two bronze medals at European championships. She was the Finnish champion in 1977–82 and 1987–88.
