= David Anear =

Australian archer (born 1948)

David Anear (born 26 March 1948) is an Australian archer.

Born in Lowestoft, United Kingdom David lived in many places including Yemen and Germany thanks to his father being in the Royal Air Force. The family moved to Australia in the 1960s.

Represented Australia in the 1976 Olympic Games where he scored 2407 points, to reach 13th place.

He was one of the bearers of the Olympic Torch for the 2000 Summer Olympics in Sydney, Australia. He carried the Olympic Torch through Healesville in Victoria.

David is a multiple National champion in archery with the Olympic recurve bow, barebow recurve and Longbow. He has also served as president to Diamond Valley Archers Inc archery club in Yarrambat Victoria where he was awarded a Life Membership.
