= Willy Van Den Bossche =

Belgian archer (born 1949)

Personal information
- Nationality: Belgian
- Born: 22 January 1949 (age 76); Adegem, Belgium

Sport
- Sport: Archery

Willy Van Den Bossche (born 22 January 1949) is a Belgian archer. He competed at the 1980 Summer Olympics and the 1984 Summer Olympics.
