= Novaya Zarya, Zabaykalsky Krai =

Novaya Zarya Новая Заря
- Selo
- Location within Zabaykalsky Krai Location within Russia
- Coordinates: 50°21′N 115°33′E
- Country: Russia
- Region: Zabaykalsky Krai
- District: Ononsky District
- Time zone: UTC+9:00

Novaya Zarya (Russian: Новая Заря) is a rural locality (a selo) in Ononsky District, Zabaykalsky Krai, Russia. Population: 619 (2021 census); 805 (2010 census); 992 (2002 census); There are 10 streets in this selo.

== Geography ==
This rural locality is located 35 km from Nizhny Tsasuchey (the district's administrative centre), 236 km from Chita (capital of Zabaykalsky Krai) and 5,561 km from Moscow. Kulusutay is the nearest rural locality.
