= Krylatskoye Sports Complex Archery Field =

Archery venue in Moscow, Russia

Coordinates: 55.7594°N 37.4347°E

The Krylatskoye Sports Complex Archery Field is a sports venue located in Moscow, Russia. Located near the Canoeing and Rowing Basin, it hosted the archery competitions for the 1980 Summer Olympics.
