= Krzysztof Włosik =

Polish archer (born 1957)

Personal information
- Nationality: Polish
- Born: 28 April 1957 (age 67); Kraków, Poland

Sport
- Sport: Archery

Krzysztof Włosik (born 28 April 1957) is a Polish archer. He competed in the men's individual event at the 1980 Summer Olympics.
