= Konrad Kwiecień =

Polish archer (born 1964)

Personal information
- Nationality: Polish
- Born: 2 March 1964 (age 61); Kielce, Poland

Sport
- Sport: Archery

Konrad Kwiecień (born 2 March 1964) is a Polish archer. He competed in the men's individual and team events at the 1992 Summer Olympics.
