= Andrei Berki =

Romanian archer (born 1952)

Personal information
- Nationality: Romanian
- Born: 7 November 1952 (age 72); Mureş, Romania

Sport
- Sport: Archery

Andrei Berki (born 7 November 1952) is a Romanian archer. He competed in the men's individual event at the 1980 Summer Olympics.
