= Giancarlo Ferrari =

Italian archer (born 1942)

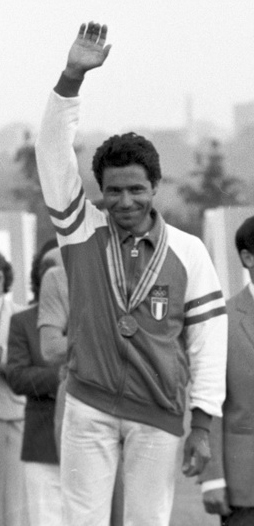
- Ferrari at the 1980 Olympics

Personal information
- Born: 22 October 1942 (age 83) Abbiategrasso, Italy
- Height: 160 cm (5 ft 3 in)
- Weight: 70 kg (154 lb)

Sport
- Sport: Archery
Medal record
Representing Italy
Olympic Games
Bronze medal – third place	1976 Montreal	Individual
Bronze medal – third place	1980 Moscow	Individual
World Archery Championships
Silver medal – second place	1977 Canberra	Team

Giancarlo Ferrari (born 22 October 1942) is a retired Italian archer. He competed in five consecutive Olympics from 1972 to 1988 and won individual bronze medals in 1976 and 1980. At the world championships in 1977 he earned a team silver medal.
