= Camp Olímpic de Tir amb Arc =

Sports venue in Barcelona, Spain

The Camp Olímpic de Tir amb Arc (English: Olympic Archery Field) was a temporary venue located in Barcelona. It hosted the archery competitions for the 1992 Summer Olympics. It was located in a site at the Ronda de Dalt, next to the Pavelló de la Vall d'Hebron, in the Barcelona district of Horta-Guinardó.

After the Olympics, it was remodelled into Ciutat Esportiva Municipal Vall d'Hebron-Teixonera (English: Vall d'Hebrón-Teixonera Municipal Sports City), which consists of two football (soccer) fields, a rugby field and an annexe service area.
