= Annikka Mutanen =

Finnish judoka

Personal information
- Nationality: Finnish
- Born: 13 April 1965 (age 59); Polvijärvi, Finland
- Occupation: Judoka

Sport
- Sport: Judo

Profile at external databases
- JudoInside.com: 2381

Annikka Mutanen (born 13 April 1965) is a Finnish judoka. She competed in the women's extra-lightweight event at the 1992 Summer Olympics.
