= Fu Shengjun =

Chinese archer (born 1972)

Personal information
- Nationality: Chinese
- Born: 28 December 1972 (age 52)

Sport
- Sport: Archery

Fu Shengjun (born 28 December 1972) is a Chinese archer. He competed at the 1992 Summer Olympics and the 2000 Summer Olympics.
