= Keijo Tahvanainen =

Finnish weightlifter

Personal information
- Nationality: Finnish
- Born: 28 February 1959 (age 66); Joensuu, Finland

Sport
- Sport: Weightlifting

Keijo Tahvanainen (born 28 February 1959) is a Finnish weightlifter. He competed at the 1984 Summer Olympics and the 1992 Summer Olympics.
