= Henrik Kromann Toft =

Danish archer (born 1968)

Personal information
- Nationality: Danish
- Born: 11 July 1968 (age 56); Aalborg, Denmark

Sport
- Sport: Archery

Henrik Kromann Toft (born 11 July 1968) is a Danish archer. He competed at the 1988 Summer Olympics and the 1992 Summer Olympics.
