= Natalia Nasaridze =

Turkish archer (born 1972)

Medal record

Women's Archery

Representing Soviet Union

European Championships
Gold medal – first place	1990 Barcelona	Individual

Representing Turkey

World Championships
Silver medal – second place	1995 Jakarta	Team

World Indoor Championships
Bronze medal – third place	1997 Istanbul	Individual

World Cup
Silver medal – second place	2011 Istanbul	Mixed Team

European Championships
Gold medal – first place	1996 Kranjska Gora	Individual
Gold medal – first place	2000 Antalya	Individual

European Indoor Championships
Gold medal – first place	2000 Spała	Individual

Mediterranean Games
Gold medal – first place	1997 Bari	Individual

International Tournaments
Bronze medal – third place	2003 Greece	Individual

Natalia Nasaridze (born 2 October 1972) is a three-time European champion archer, who competes internationally for Turkey.

She is from the Republic of Georgia. She is coached by Vladimir Lekveshivili and is a member of Antalya Specialization Club. During a competition in Turkey, Uğur Erdener offered her membership in the Turkey national archery team for the next Olympics. She accepted to move to Turkey because she had no chance in her country to compete at the Olympics. After naturalization, she won several medals for Turkey at international competitions, and took part four times at the Olympics.

== International ==
=== Olympics ===
Nasaridze represented Turkey at the 1992, 1996, 2000 and 2004 Summer Olympics. In these events, she placed 15th, 21st, 17th, and 49th respectively.

During the 1996 Summer Olympics, on July 29, 1996 she broke the Olympic record by scoring 168 points in an 18 arrow match.

In 2004, she placed 16th in the women's individual ranking round with a 72-arrow score of 639. In the first round of elimination, she faced 49th-ranked Mari Piuva of Finland. Nasaridze lost in a close upset 136-133 in the 18-arrow match, placing 49th overall in women's individual archery. She was also a member of the 10th-place Turkish women's archery team.

Year	Competition	Place	Result	Event
Soviet Union
1990	European Championships	Barcelona, Spain	Gold	Individual
Turkey
1995	World Championships	Jakarta, Indonesia	Silver	Team
1996	European Championships	Kranjska Gora, Slovenia	Gold	Individual
1997	Mediterranean Games	Bari, Italy	Gold	
1997	World Indoor Championships	Istanbul, Turkey	Bronze	Individual
2000	European Championships	Antalya, Turkey	Gold	Individual
2000	European Indoor Championships	Spała, Polabd	Gold	Individual
2003	World Indoor Championships	Nimes, France	30th	Individual
2003	Grand Prix	Croatia	20th	Individual
2003	Grand Prix	France	30th	Individual
2003	Golden Arrow Grand Prix	Turkey	28th	Individual
2003	World Championships]	New York City, USA	16th (qualifier for 2004 Summer Olympics)	Individual
2003	International Tournament	Greece	Bronze	Individual
2004	Grand Prix	Italy	25th	Individual
2004	European Championships	Brussels, Belgium	48th	Individual
2004	Grand Prix	Germany	75th	Individual
2011	world Cup Istanbul, Turkey		Silver	Mixed Team
