= Yolanda Soler =

Spanish judoka (born 1972)

Personal information
- Born: 1 February 1972 (age 54)
- Occupation: Judoka
- Website: yolandasoler.net

Sport
- Country: Spain
- Sport: Judo
- Weight class: –‍48 kg

Achievements and titles
- Olympic Games: (bronze) (1996)
- World Champ.: 5th (1993)
- European Champ.: (gold) (1994, 1995, 1996)
Medal record
Women's judo
Representing Spain
Olympic Games
Bronze medal – third place	1996 Atlanta	‍–‍48 kg
European Championships
Gold medal – first place	1994 Gdansk	‍–‍48 kg
Gold medal – first place	1995 Birmingham	‍–‍48 kg
Gold medal – first place	1996 The Hague	‍–‍48 kg
Silver medal – second place	1992 Paris	‍–‍48 kg
Bronze medal – third place	1991 Prague	‍–‍48 kg
Bronze medal – third place	1998 Oviedo	‍–‍48 kg

Profile at external databases
- IJF: 473
- JudoInside.com: 637
- Updated on 4 June 2023

Yolanda Soler (born 9 January 1972) is a Spanish judoka. She won a bronze medal in the lightweight (48 kg) division at the 1996 Summer Olympics in Atlanta.
