= Małgorzata Roszkowska =

Polish judoka

Personal information
- Nationality: Polish
- Born: 27 September 1967 (age 57); Białystok, Poland

Sport
- Sport: Judo

Małgorzata Roszkowska (born 27 September 1967) is a Polish judoka. She competed at the 1992 Summer Olympics and the 1996 Summer Olympics.
