= Bruno Felipe (archer) =

French archer (born 1964)

Personal information
- Nationality: French
- Born: 29 March 1964 (age 60); Saint-Ouen, France

Sport
- Sport: Archery

Bruno Felipe (born 29 March 1964) is a French archer. He competed in the men's individual event at the 1992 Summer Olympics.
