= Boris Isachenko =

Belarusian archer (1958–2026)

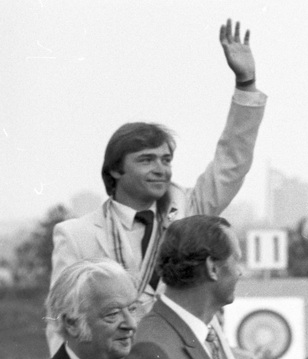
- Isachenko in 1980

Personal information
- Born: 26 December 1958 Brest, Byelorussian SSR, Soviet Union
- Died: 12 June 2026 (aged 67)
- Height: 174 cm (5 ft 9 in)
- Weight: 74 kg (163 lb)

Sport
- Sport: Archery
- Club: Krasnoye Znamya Brest
Medal record
Representing Soviet Union
Olympic Games
Silver medal – second place	1980 Moscow	Individual
European Archery Championships
Silver medal – second place	1982 Kecskemét	Team, outdoor
Gold medal – first place	1983 Falun	Team, indoor
Silver medal – second place	1983 Falun	Individual, indoor
Gold medal – first place	1987 Parigi-Bercy	Team, indoor

Boris Valentinovich Isachenko (Russian: Борис Валентинович Исаченко, Belarusian: Барыс Валянцінавіч Ісачэнка, romanized: Barys Valjancinavič Isačenka; 26 December 1958 – 12 June 2026) was a Belarusian archer who competed for the Soviet Union. He won individual silver medals at the 1980 Olympics and 1983 European Championships, but never won a Soviet title or a medal at a world championships. Besides competitions he acted as a sports official with the Soviet State Committee for Physical Culture and Sports (1979–91) and Belarus Ministry of Sports (1991–97). In 1997–99 he headed the Robin Hood Archery Club. Isachenko was a member of the Belarusian Archery Federation, and from 1998 to his death in 2026 trained the Belarusian archery team. He was also a member of the Belarusian Olympic Committee from 2002 to his death. Isachenko died on 12 June 2026, at the age of 67.
