= Riikka Ukkola =

Finnish swimmer

Personal information
- Born: 25 March 1968 (age 58) Helsinki, Finland

Sport
- Sport: Swimming

Riikka Ukkola (born 25 March 1968) is a Finnish former swimmer. She competed in two events at the 1992 Summer Olympics.
