= Andrea Rodrigues (judoka) =

Brazilian judoka (born 1973)

Personal information
- Full name: Andréa Berti Rodrigues Guedes
- Born: 3 January 1973 (age 53) Santos, São Paulo, Brazil

Sport
- Sport: Judo
Medal record
Representing Brazil
Pan American Games
| Bronze medal – third place | 1995 Mar del Plata | Extra-lightweight |
Pan American Championships
| Gold medal – first place | 2001 Cordoba | Extra-lightweight |
| Silver medal – second place | 1997 Guadalajara | Extra-lightweight |
| Bronze medal – third place | 1992 Hamilton | Extra-lightweight |
| Bronze medal – third place | 1994 Santiago | Extra-lightweight |

Andréa Berti Rodrigues Guedes (born 3 January 1973) is a Brazilian judoka. She competed at the 1992 Summer Olympics and the 1996 Summer Olympics.
