= Andreas Lippoldt =

German archer (born 1967)

Personal information
- Nationality: German
- Born: 3 July 1967 (age 58) Sindelfingen, West Germany

Sport
- Sport: Archery

Andreas Lippoldt (born 3 July 1967) is a German former archer. He competed in the men's individual and team events at the 1992 Summer Olympics.
