= Alessandro Rivolta =

Italian archer (born 1962)

Personal information
- Nationality: Italian
- Born: 9 June 1962 (age 63) Oleggio, Italy

Sport
- Sport: Archery

Alessandro Rivolta (born 9 June 1962) is an Italian former archer. He competed in the men's individual and team events at the 1992 Summer Olympics.
