= Tserendorjiin Dagvadorj =

Mongolian archer (born 1940)

Personal information
- Nationality: Mongolian
- Born: 25 October 1940 (age 84)

Sport
- Sport: Archery

Tserendorjiin Dagvadorj (born 25 October 1940) is a Mongolian archer. He competed at the 1976 Summer Olympics and the 1980 Summer Olympics.
