= Ismo Falck =

Finnish archer (born 1966)

Personal information
- Born: 22 August 1966 (age 59) Paltamo, Kainuu, Finland
Medal record
Men's archery
Representing Finland
Olympic Games
Silver medal – second place	1992 Barcelona	Team competition

Ismo Kalevi Falck (born 22 August 1966) is a Finnish former archer who participated in two consecutive Olympic competitions, starting in 1988. He won the silver medal in the Men's Team Competition in 1992 (Barcelona, Spain) alongside Tomi Poikolainen and Jari Lipponen.
