= Nataliya Kuligina =

Kyrgyzstani judoka (born 1971)

Personal information
- Nationality: Kyrgyzstani
- Born: 12 August 1971 (age 55)

Sport
- Sport: Judo

Nataliya Kuligina (born 12 August 1971) is a Kyrgyzstani former judoka. She competed at the 1996 Summer Olympics and the 2000 Summer Olympics.
