= Nyamtserengiin Byambasüren =

Mongolian archer (born 1954)

Personal information
- Nationality: Mongolian
- Born: 30 January 1954 (age 71)

Sport
- Sport: Archery

Nyamtserengiin Byambasüren (born 30 January 1954) is a Mongolian archer. He competed at the 1976 Summer Olympics and the 1980 Summer Olympics.
