= Sébastien Flute =

French archer (born 1972)

Medal record

Men's archery

Representing France

Olympic Games
Gold medal – first place	1992 Barcelona	Individual

World Championships
Gold medal – first place	1993 Antalya	Team

European Championships
Gold medal – first place	1992	Individual

Sébastien Flute (born 25 March 1972 in Brest, Brittany) is a gold medal winning French archer. He currently has the 25th best ranking in the world among archers. He won the gold medal in the Men's Individual competition in the 1992 Summer Olympics, the 20-year-old European champion defeated all three South Korean archers on his way to the Olympic Title; and also competed in the 1996 Olympic Games and the 2000 Olympic Games. He retired from International competition after the 2000 Sydney Olympics.

In 2009 he came out of retirement, hoping to gain a place at the London 2012 Olympics. However, on 17 March 2012 he announced that he had not been selected and that he was returning to retirement.

From February 2022 to September 2024, he served as archery sports manager for the 2024 Summer Olympics and the 2024 Summer Paralympics held in Paris, France.
