= European Archery Championships =

- Status: active
- Genre: European Championship
- Date: mid-year
- Frequency: biennial
- Inaugurated: 1968
- Previous event: 2024 European Archery Championships
- Next event: TBD
- Organiser: World Archery Europe

The European Archery Championships is a series of outdoor, indoor, field, 3D and other archery championship in Europe. They are organised by World Archery Europe, the organisation of the European continent which is part of World Archery. Depending on the discipline, archers can compete in these bow divisions: Recurve bow, Barebow, Compound bow, Longbow, Traditional bow, plus team events and mixed teams (women and men for each division).

== Championships ==
1968-2012: European Mediterranean Archery Championships

2014-2022: European Archery Championships

European and Mediterranean Archery Union (EMAU) = 17 April 1988

World Archery Europe (WAE) = 20 May 2012

=== Outdoor ===
European Outdoor Target Championship

Source: https://sport-record.de/archery/outdoor-ech.pdf (Full results)

European Cup

I. 1965, Aug 20 - 24 Nürnberg FRG

II. 1966, Sep 04 Varese ITA

III. 1967, May 20 - 21 Genève SUI

Unofficial European Championship

1968, Sep 06 - 07 Reutte AUT

1970, Jul 10 - 11 Hradec Králové TCH

1984, Oct in ITA not held

Num.	Edition	Host city	Host country	Events
European Championship
1	1968	Reutte	Austria	4
2	1970	Hradec Králové	Czechoslovakia	4
3	1972	Walferdange	Luxembourg	4
4	1974	Zagreb	Yugoslavia	4
5	1976	Copenhagen	Denmark	4
6	1978	Stoneleigh	United Kingdom	4
Championship of Europe and the Mediterranean
7	1980	Compiègne	France	4
8	1982	Kecskemét	Hungary	4
9	1986	İzmir	Turkey	4
10	1988	Luxembourg	Luxembourg	4
11	1990	Barcelona	Spain	4
12	1992	Valletta	Malta	4
13	1994	Nymburk	Czech Republic	8
14	1996	Kranjska Gora	Slovenia	8
15	1998	Boé – Agen	France	8
16	2000	Antalya	Turkey	8
17	2002	Oulu	Finland	8
18	2004	Brussels	Belgium	8
19	2006	Athens	Greece	8
20	2008	Vittel	France	8
21	2010	Rovereto	Italy	10
22	2012	Amsterdam	Netherlands	10
European Championship
23	2014	Vagharshapat	Armenia	10
24	2016	Nottingham	United Kingdom	10
25	2018	Legnica	Poland	10
26	2021	Antalya	Turkey	10
27	2022	Munich	Germany	10
28	2024	Rhine-Ruhr	Germany	10
29	2026	Antalya	Turkey	10

=== Indoor ===
European & Mediterranean Indoor Archery Championship

Source: https://sport-record.de/archery/indoor_wae.pdf (Full results)

Num.	Edition	Host City	Host country	Events
1	1983	Falun	Sweden	4
2	1985	Odense	Denmark	4
3	1987	Paris	France	4
4	1989	Athens	Greece	4
5	1996	Mol	Belgium	8
6	1998	Oldenburg	Germany	8
7	2000	Spała	Poland	8
8	2002	Ankara	Turkey	8
9	2004	Sassari	Italy	8
10	2006	Jaén	Spain	8
11	2008	Turin	Italy	15
12	2010	Poreč	Croatia	16
13	2011	Cambrils	Spain	16
14	2013	Rzeszów	Poland	16
15	2015	Koper	Slovenia	14
16	2017	Vittel	France	16
17	2019	Samsun	Turkey	16
18	2022	Laško	Slovenia	22
19	2023	Samsun	Turkey	22
20	2024	Varaždin	Croatia	22
21	2025	Samsun	Turkey	22
22	2026	Plovdiv	Bulgaria	22

=== Field (Senior/Junior) ===
https://sport-record.de/archery/field-archery_wae.pdf

Num.	Edition	Host City	Host country	Events
1	1970	Rhondda	United Kingdom	4
2	1972	Passariano	Italy	4
3	1974	Zagreb	Yugoslavia	4
4	1976	Mölndal	Sweden	4
5	1978	Geneva	Switzerland	4
6	1980	Compiègne	France	4
7	1982	Kingsclere	United Kingdom	4
8	1984	Hyvinkää	Finland	4
9	1986	Radstadt	Austria	4
10	1988	Bolzano	Italy	4
11	1995	Lillehammer	Norway	8
12	1997	Ardesio	Italy	8
13S/1J	1999	Bovec	Slovenia	8
14S/2J	2001	Železná Ruda	Czech Republic	8
15S/3J	2003	Vagney	France	8
16S/4J	2005	Rogla	Slovenia	8
17S/5J	2007	Bjelovar	Croatia	8
18S/6J	2009	Champagnac	France	8
19S/7J	2011	Montevarchi	Italy	8
20S/8J	2013	Terni	Italy	8
21S/9J	2015	Rzeszów	Poland	8
22S/10J	2017	Koper	Slovenia	8
23S/11J	2019	Mokrice	Slovenia	8
24S/12J	2021	Poreč	Croatia	11
25S/13J	2023	Cesena	Italy	11
26S/14J	2025	Książ	Poland	11

=== European Archery 3D Championships ===
https://sport-record.de/archery/3d-wae.pdf

Num.	Edition	Host City	Host country	Events
1	2008	Punta Umbría	Spain	10
2	2010	Sassari	Italy	10
3	2012	Trakošćan	Croatia	10
4	2014	Tallinn	Estonia	10
5	2016	Mokrice	Slovenia	10
6	2018	Gothenburg	Sweden	10
7	2021	Maribor	Slovenia	10
8	2023	Cesana	Italy	14
9	2025	Divčibare	Serbia	14

=== Para ===
European Para-Archery Championships

Num.	Edition	Host City	Host country	Events
1	2006	Nymburk	Czech Republic	
2	2010	Vichy	France	
3	2014	Nottwil	Switzerland	
4	2016	Saint-Jean-de-Monts	France	
5	2018	Plzeň	Czech Republic	
6	2020	Olbia	Italy	

=== University ===
European Universities Championships

=== Crossbow ===
https://www.worldcrossbow.com/

3rd European Crossbow Championship 2009

Field Crossbow European Championships 2013 Innsbruck

=== Clubs ===
https://sport-record.de/archery/outdoor-wae.html#ectc

== Medals ==
Medal table of (Italy) 2026 European Youth Archery Championships

* Host nation (Italy)

Rank	Nation	Gold	Silver	Bronze	Total
1	Turkey	5	8	5	18
2	France	4	1	2	7
3	Great Britain	4	1	0	5
4	Spain	3	0	2	5
5	Germany	2	3	2	7
6	Italy*	1	3	3	7
7	Individual Neutral Athletes	1	1	3	5
8	Ukraine	1	1	0	2
9	Croatia	1	0	1	2
10	Netherlands	1	0	0	1
11	Bulgaria	0	1	2	3
12	Iceland	0	1	1	2
13	Estonia	0	1	0	1
13	Sweden	0	1	0	1
13	Switzerland	0	1	0	1
16	Slovakia	0	0	1	1
16	Slovenia	0	0	1	1
Totals (17 entries)		23	23	23	69

== Results ==
- Winners
- http://www.archeryeurope.org/
- http://www.emau.org/
- History
- http://www.sport-komplett.de/sport-komplett/sportarten/b/bogenschiessen/_historie.htm
- http://www.sport-komplett.de/sport-komplett/sportarten/b/bogenschiessen/hst/62.html
- http://www.sport-komplett.de/sport-komplett/sportarten/b/bogenschiessen/hst/23.html
- http://www.sport-komplett.de/sport-komplett/sportarten/b/bogenschiessen/hst/72.html
- http://www.sport-komplett.de/sport-komplett/sportarten/b/bogenschiessen/hst/75.html
- https://worldarchery.sport/competition/189/european-outdoor-archery-championship
- https://sport-record.de/archery/archery-wae.html
- https://sport-record.de/archery/3d-wae.html
- https://sport-record.de/archery/field-wae.html
- https://sport-record.de/archery/outdoor-wae.html#ech
- https://sport-record.de/archery/outdoor-wae.html#ectc
- https://sport-record.de/archery/indoor-wae.html
- https://sport-record.de/archery/runarchery-wae.html
- https://sport-record.de/archery/skiarchery-wae.html
