= Jari Lipponen =

Finnish archer (born 1972)

Personal information
- Born: 17 October 1972 (age 53); Kemi, Finnish Lapland
Medal record
Men's Archery
Representing Finland
Olympic Games
Silver medal – second place	1992 Barcelona	Team competition

Jari Matti Lipponen (born 17 October 1972) is a Finnish former archer who participated in three consecutive Olympic competitions, starting in 1992. He won the silver medal in the Men's Team Competition in 1992 (Barcelona, Spain) alongside Tomi Poikolainen and Ismo Falck.
