= Vladimir Yesheyev =

Soviet archer of Buryat-Mongolian ancestry (born 1958)

Personal information
- Full name: Vladimir Nikolayevich Yesheyev
- Born: 7 May 1958 (age 68) Novaya Zarya, Ononsky District, Chita Oblast, Russian SFSR, Soviet Union (now Zabaykalsky Krai, Russia)
Medal record
Men's Archery
Representing Soviet Union
Olympic Games
Bronze medal – third place	1988 Seoul	Individual
World Championships
Gold medal – first place	1989 Lausanne	Team
Gold medal – first place	1987 Adelaide	Individual

Vladimir Nikolayevich Yesheyev (Russian: Владимир Николаевич Ешеев; born 7 May 1958) is a former archer from the Soviet Union of Buryat-Mongolian ancestry.

== Career ==
He competed for the Soviet Union in the 1980 Summer Olympics held in Moscow, Soviet Union in the individual event where he finished in sixth place. He missed the following Olympics due to the boycott but returned to compete in the 1988 Summer Olympics where he finished in third in the individual competition and fifth in the team event. Four years later competing for the Unified team finishing eleventh in the individual event and eighth in the team event.

He is the President of Russian Archery Federation. The Russian archery team at the 2008 Summer Olympics in the team event brought back to Russia Bair Badënov's bronze (the next national Olympic bronze in archery after Yesheyev's).

After the 2022 Russian invasion of Ukraine, the World Archery executive board voted to remove the Russian and Belarusian national flags and anthems from all international tournaments, and not to have either country host their archery events. Though he was an executive board member, he was not invited to the discussion or vote.
