= List of flag bearers for Bhutan at the Olympics =

Bhutan at the Olympics
- IOC code: BHU
- NOC: Bhutan Olympic Committee
- Website: bhutanolympiccommittee.org
- Medals: Gold 0 Silver 0 Bronze 0 Total 0

Summer appearances
- 1984; 1988; 1992; 1996; 2000; 2004; 2008; 2012; 2016; 2020; 2024

This is a list of flag bearers who have represented Bhutan at the Olympics.

Flag bearers carry the national flag of their country at the opening ceremony of the Olympic Games.

#	Event year	Season	Flag bearer	Sport
1	1984	Summer	Thinley Dorji	Archery
2	1988	Summer	Pema Tshering	Archery
3	1992	Summer	Jubzhang Jubzhang	Archery
4	1996	Summer	Jubzhang Jubzhang	Archery
5	2000	Summer	Jubzhang Jubzhang	Archery
6	2004	Summer	Tshering Choden	Archery
7	2008	Summer	Tashi Peljor	Archery
8	2012	Summer	Sherab Zam	Archery
9	2016	Summer	Karma	Archery
10	2020	Summer	Karma	Archery
10	2020	Summer	Sangay Tenzin	Swimming
11	2024	Summer	Kinzang Lhamo	Athletics
11	2024	Summer	Sangay Tenzin	Swimming

== See also ==
- Bhutan at the Olympics
