= Bhutan at the Olympics =

- IOC code: BHU
- NOC: Bhutan Olympic Committee
- Website: bhutanolympiccommittee.org
- Medals: Gold 0 Silver 0 Bronze 0 Total 0

Summer appearances
- 1984; 1988; 1992; 1996; 2000; 2004; 2008; 2012; 2016; 2020; 2024; 2028

Bhutan has participated in every Summer Olympic Games since its debut in 1984. The nation has never competed at the Winter Olympic Games.

The Bhutan Olympic Committee was recognized by the International Olympic Committee on 23 November 1983, after being founded earlier that year by former Foreign Minister Lyonpo Dawa Tsering. To get official recognition, Bhutan needed five national sports federations, which they achieved.

Bhutanese Olympians have mostly competed in archery; however, the country has also taken part in events such as shooting, swimming, judo, and athletics. As of 2025, Bhutan has yet to win an Olympic medal. They sent their largest delegation of six archers to the 1984 Games. Their best results were in 2004, when Tashi Peljor and Tshering Choden both reached the round of 32 in men's and women's archery, respectively.

== History ==
The National Sports Association of Bhutan (NSAB) was established in 1972 and was the precursor of the Bhutan Olympic Committee (BOC). The BOC was recognized by the International Olympic Committee (IOC) on 23 November 1983, (Note: Olympedia states it was given recognition by the IOC in April 1984.) after being founded in February of that year by the former Foreign Minister of Bhutan, Lyonpo Dawa Tsering. As of 2024, the BOC has affiliations with 16 national sports federations. In addition to the IOC, the BOC is also part of the five other international sports bodies: the Association of National Olympic Committees, the Olympic Council of Asia, the South Asia Olympic Council, the Asia-Pacific Oceana Sports Assembly, and the Far East and South Pacific Games Federation for the Disabled.

== Olympic overview ==
=== 1984 Summer Olympics ===
Bhutan sent a delegation to compete at the 1984 Summer Olympics in Los Angeles (LA), United States which took place from July 28 to August 12, 1984. It was the nation's debut appearance at the Summer Olympics. The delegation consisted of six athletes competing in archery. Thinley Dorji served as the team's flagbearer in the opening ceremony. Overall, the best result was Sonam Chuki, coming in 43rd, and the worst was Lhendup Tshering, coming 60th.

=== 1988 Summer Olympics ===
Bhutan sent three people to compete at the 1988 Summer Olympics in Seoul, South Korea which took place from 17 September to 2 October 1988. It was the nation's second consecutive appearance at the Summer Olympics. The delegation consisted of all archers. Pema Tshering served as the team's flagbearer in the opening ceremony. None of the Bhutanese archers advanced past the ranking round, both as teams and individuals. As individuals, their best placement was 73rd and the lowest was 80th. As a team, their placement was 22nd.

=== 1992 Summer Olympics ===
Bhutan sent a delegation of six to compete at the 1992 Summer Olympics in Barcelona, Spain which took place from 25 July to 9 August 1992. It was the nation's third consecutive appearance at the Summer Olympics. The whole delegation consisted of archers. Jubzhang Jubzhang served as the team's flagbearer in the opening ceremony. None of the Bhutanese archers advanced past the ranking round, both as teams and individuals. The Bhutanese women's team was the only team to not advance to the Round of 16 in their event.

=== 1996 Summer Olympics ===
Bhutan's delegation sent to compete at the 1996 Summer Olympics in Atlanta, United States which took place from 19 July to 4 August 1996. It was the nation's fourth consecutive appearance at the Summer Olympics. The delegation consisted of two athletes competing in archery. Jubzhang again served as the team's flagbearer in the opening ceremony. None of the Bhutanese archers advanced past the Round of 64, with both of them being defeated by Ukrainians.

=== 2000 Summer Olympics ===
Bhutan competed at the 2000 Summer Olympics in Sydney, Australia which took place from 15 September to 1 October 2000. It was the nation's fifth consecutive appearance at the Summer Olympics. The delegation consisted of two athletes competing in one sport: Jubzhang and Tshering Choden in archery. Jubzhang was yet again chosen as the flag bearer for the opening ceremony. Neither of the archers advanced past the Round of 64.

=== 2004 Summer Olympics ===
Bhutan competed at the 2004 Summer Olympics in Athens, Greece which took place from 13 to 29 August 2004. It was the nation's sixth consecutive appearance at the Summer Olympics. The delegation consisted of two athletes competing in one sport: Tshering Choden and Tashi Peljor in archery. Choden served as the team's flagbearer in the opening ceremony, while Peljor held the flag at the closing ceremony. Peljor defeated Jocelyn de Grandis in the Round of 64 and advanced to the Round of 32, where he lost, 152–155. Choden also won in the first round and advanced to the Round of 32, where she tied 134–134 before losing in a 4–7 tiebreaker. As of 2024, these are the best Bhutanese results at the Games.

=== 2008 Summer Olympics ===
Bhutan sent a delegation to compete in the 2008 Summer Olympics, held in Beijing, China which took place from 8 to 24 August 2008. This was Bhutan's seventh time participating in a Summer Olympic Games. The delegation consisted of two archers, Peljor and Dorji Dema. Peljor was the flagbearer in both the opening and closing ceremonies. Neither won their first round match.

=== 2012 Summer Olympics ===
Bhutan sent a team of two to compete at the 2012 Summer Olympics in London, which took place from 27 July to 12 August 2012. This marked the nation's eighth appearance at the Summer Olympics and the first in which the nation competed in a sport other than archery. The Bhutanese delegation included archer Sherab Zam and shooter Kunzang Choden. Zam was the flag bearer for both the opening and closing ceremonies. Neither of Bhutan's athletes progressed beyond the first round of their events. Bhutan was one of only two countries to have a female-only team at the 2012 Games.

=== 2016 Summer Olympics ===
Bhutan competed at the 2016 Summer Olympics in Rio de Janeiro, which was held from 5 to 21 August 2016. The country's participation marked its ninth appearance in the Summer Olympics. The delegation included two female athletes, Karma in the women's individual archery tournament and Kunzang Lenchu in the women's 10 metre air rifle shooting contest. Both qualified for the Games through universality places because they did not match the required qualification standards. Karma was selected as the flag bearer for the opening ceremony while Lenchu held it at the closing ceremony. Karma was eliminated in the Round of 64, while Lenchu was eliminated from the competition after the shooting qualification round.

=== 2020 Summer Olympics ===
The Bhutanese team competed at the 2020 Summer Olympics in Tokyo, Japan,which was held from 23 July to 8 August 2021, it was the nation's tenth consecutive appearance at the Summer Olympics. The delegation consisted of four athletes competing in four sports; archery, judo, shooting, and swimming. Karma, and Sangay Tenzin, a swimmer, served as the team's flagbearers in the opening ceremony, while Tenzin was the sole flagbearer in the closing ceremony. Karma lost in the Round of 64 of the women's individual recurve archery. Competing in the men's –60 kg judo event, Ngawang Namgyel lost in the first round. Lenchu Kunzang participated in the qualifiers of the women's 10 m air rifle. She got 43rd place overall, failing to advance to the final. Tenzin participated in the heats of the men's 100 metre freestyle in heat one. He finished the race in 68th place overall, and failed to advance to the semifinals. Karma was the first Bhutanese athlete to qualify through meeting qualification standards and not a universality place.

=== 2024 Summer Olympics ===
Bhutan competed at the 2024 Summer Olympics in Paris, France which took place from 26 July to 11 August 2024. It was the nation's eleventh consecutive appearance at the Summer Olympics. The delegation consisted of three athletes competing in three sports. Tenzin and Kinzang Lhamo served as the team's flagbearers in the opening ceremony, while Lhamo was the sole flagbearer in the closing ceremony. Archer Lam Dorji lost in the Round of 64. Lhamo got last place in the women's marathon. Tenzin was eliminated in the heats of the men's 100 m freestyle swimming event, failing to advance to the semifinal.

== Medal tables ==
Games	Athletes	Gold	Silver	Bronze	Total	Rank
1984 Los Angeles	6	0	0	0	0	–
1988 Seoul	3	0	0	0	0	–
1992 Barcelona	6	0	0	0	0	–
1996 Atlanta	2	0	0	0	0	–
2000 Sydney	2	0	0	0	0	–
2004 Athens	2	0	0	0	0	–
2008 Beijing	2	0	0	0	0	–
2012 London	2	0	0	0	0	–
2016 Rio de Janeiro	2	0	0	0	0	–
2020 Tokyo	4	0	0	0	0	–
2024 Paris	3	0	0	0	0	–
2028 Los Angeles	future event					
2032 Brisbane	future event					
Total		0	0	0	0	–

== Flagbearers ==
Opening flagbearers at the Olympics
#	Event year	Season	Flag bearer	Sport	Reference
1	1984	Summer	Thinley Dorji	Archery	
2	1988	Summer	Pema Tshering	Archery	
3	1992	Summer	Jubzhang Jubzhang	Archery	
4	1996	Summer	Jubzhang Jubzhang	Archery	
5	2000	Summer	Jubzhang Jubzhang	Archery	
6	2004	Summer	Tshering Choden	Archery	
7	2008	Summer	Tashi Peljor	Archery	
8	2012	Summer	Sherab Zam	Archery	
9	2016	Summer	Karma	Archery	
10	2020	Summer	Karma	Archery	
10	2020	Summer	Sangay Tenzin	Swimming	
11	2024	Summer	Kinzang Lhamo	Athletics	
11	2024	Summer	Sangay Tenzin	Swimming	

Closing flagbearers at the Olympics
#	Event year	Season	Flag bearer	Sport	References
6	2004	Summer	Tashi Peljor	Archery	
7	2008	Summer	Tashi Peljor	Archery	
8	2012	Summer	Sherab Zam	Archery	
9	2016	Summer	Lenchu Kunzang	Shooting	
10	2020	Summer	Sangay Tenzin	Swimming	
11	2024	Summer	Kinzang Lhamo	Athletics	
