= Bhutan at the 2020 Summer Olympics =

- IOC code: BHU
- NOC: Bhutan Olympic Committee
- Website: bhutanolympiccommittee.org

in Tokyo, Japan 23 July 2021 – 8 August 2021
- Competitors: 4 in 4 sports
- Flag bearers (opening): Karma; Sangay Tenzin
- Flag bearer (closing): Sangay Tenzin
- Medals: Gold 0 Silver 0 Bronze 0 Total 0

Summer Olympics appearances (overview)
- 1984; 1988; 1992; 1996; 2000; 2004; 2008; 2012; 2016; 2020; 2024

Bhutan competed at the 2020 Summer Olympics in Tokyo, Japan, from 23 July to 8 August 2021, it was the nation's tenth consecutive appearance at the Summer Olympics since its debut in 1984. The delegation consisted of four athletes competing in four sports: archery, judo, shooting, and swimming. Bhutan did not win any medals during the Tokyo Olympics. Karma, an archer, and Sangay Tenzin, a swimmer, served as the team's flagbearers in the opening ceremony, while Tenzin was the sole flagbearer in the closing ceremony.

Karma lost to Deepika Kumari in the Round of 64 of the women's individual recurve archery. She lost 0–6, failing to advance to the Round of 32. Competing in the men's –60 kg judo event, Ngawang Namgyel lost to Mihraç Akkuş through a juji-gatame. He lost in 2:56 minutes. On 24 July, Lenchu Kunzang participated in the qualifiers of the women's 10 m air rifle. She got 681.1 points, putting her in 43rd place overall, failing to advance to the final. On 27 July, Tenzin participated in the heats of the men's 100 metre freestyle in heat one. He finished the race in 57.57 seconds, in 68th place overall, and failed to advance to the semifinals.

== Background ==
The Bhutan Olympic Committee was recognized by the IOC on 23 November 1983. The appearance of Bhutan at the Tokyo Summer Olympics marked their tenth consecutive summer appearance since it first entered the Games during the 1984 Summer Olympics. Bhutan has never won an Olympic medal as of these Games.

The 2020 Summer Olympics were originally scheduled to take place in Tokyo, Japan from 24 July to 9 August 2020, however, the Games were postponed to 23 July to 8 August 2021 because of the COVID-19 pandemic. Bhutan sent a delegation of four athletes. Karma, an archer, and Sangay Tenzin, a swimmer, served as the team's flagbearers in the opening ceremony, while Tenzin was the sole flagbearer in the closing ceremony.

== Competitors ==
Karma began archery in April 2009. She went to her first international competition in 2012, and competed in her first Olympics in 2016. She is the first athlete from Bhutan who got a place in the quota allocation system of the Olympics in any sport. While training for the 2020 Games, Karma did a "Robin Hood" shot, which is an arrow being fired into another arrow that is already in the target board, splitting it, as in the stories of Robin Hood. The odds of making this shot are 1 in 3,000.

Ngawang Namgyel was trained in Japan before the Games. This was Namgyel's debut appearance at the Olympics as well as the first ever appearance of a Bhutanese judoka.

Lenchu Kunzang was trained as a police officer, graduating from the Jigmeling Police Training Centre in Gelephu in 2012, topping her class in rifle shooting, and was later stationed in Phuntsholing. Along with three others, she was approached by the Bhutan Olympic Committee who were looking for elite shooters from the police training centre. She was selected as part of the national team by the Bhutan Shooting Federation in 2013. She participated at the 2016 Olympic Games but did not place.

Tenzin's appearance was the first ever of a Bhutanese swimmer. He would participate again at the 2024 Summer Olympics in the same event.

Sport	Men	Women	Total
Archery	0	1	1
Judo	1	0	1
Shooting	0	1	1
Swimming	1	0	1
Total	2	2	4

== Archery ==
Bhutan was represented by one female athlete at the 2020 Summer Olympics in archery: Karma in the women's individual event. She qualified for the women's individual recurve at the Games by reaching the quarterfinal stage and obtaining one of the three available spots at the 2019 Asian Archery Championships in Bangkok, Thailand. This marks the first time that a Bhutanese athlete achieved an Olympic quota spot in any sport. This was Karma's second appearance at the Olympics after being at Rio 2016. She participated in the ranking round where she scored 616 points, placing her at the 56th seed. On 28 July, her opponent, Deepika Kumari, defeated her in the Round of 64 in the women's individual recurve. She lost 0–6, failing to advance to the Round of 32.

Athlete	Event	Ranking round		Round of 64	Round of 32	Round of 16	Quarterfinals	Semifinals	Final / BM	
Athlete	Event	Score	Seed	Opposition Score	Opposition Score	Opposition Score	Opposition Score	Opposition Score	Opposition Score	Rank
Karma	Women's individual	616	56	Kumari (IND); L 0–6	Did not advance					

== Judo ==
Bhutan was represented by one male athlete at the 2020 Summer Olympics in Judo: Namgyel in the men's 60 kg. He qualified via a universality place from the International Judo Federation. (Note: Universality places are places awarded to countries that send small delegations to the Olympics. They let the nations' best athlete qualify for the Olympics.) This was Namgyel's debut appearance at the Olympics as well as the first appearance of a Bhutanese judoka.

Competing in the men's –60 kg event, Ngawang Namgyel lost to Mihraç Akkuş through a juji-gatame. He lost in 2:56 minutes on 24 July. Despite the loss, the Bhutan Judo Association described Namgyel's performance as "good positive judo" noting that the judoka attempted a seoi nage on his Turkish opponent. Namgyel's loss was attributed to the lack of left-handed senior judoka in Bhutan to spar with during training, as well as newaza or ground training not being a significant part of Namgyel's preparations.

Athlete	Event	Round of 32	Round of 16	Quarterfinals	Semifinals	Repechage	Final / BM	
Athlete	Event	Opposition Result	Opposition Result	Opposition Result	Opposition Result	Opposition Result	Opposition Result	Rank
Ngawang Namgyel	Men's 60 kg	Akkuş (TUR); L 00–10	Did not advance					

== Shooting ==
Bhutan was represented by one female athlete at the 2020 Summer Olympics in shooting: Kunzang in the women's 10 m air rifle. She qualified via a universality place from the Tripartite Commission. This was Kunzang's second appearance at the Olympics. On 24 July, she participated in the qualifiers of the women's 10 m air rifle. She got 681.1 points, putting her in 43rd place overall, failing to advance to the final.

Athlete	Event	Qualification		Final	
Athlete	Event	Points	Rank	Points	Rank
Lenchu Kunzang	Women's 10 m air rifle	618.1	43	Did not advance	

== Swimming ==
Bhutan was represented by one male athlete at the 2020 Summer Olympics in swimming: Sangay Tenzin in the men's 100 m freestyle. He qualified via a universality place. This was Tenzin's debut appearance at the Olympics as well as the first appearance of a Bhutanese swimmer. On 27 July, he participated in the heats of the men's 100 metre freestyle in heat one. He finished the race in 57.57 seconds, in 68th place overall, and failed to advance to the semifinals.

Athlete	Event	Heat		Semifinal		Final	
Athlete	Event	Time	Rank	Time	Rank	Time	Rank
Sangay Tenzin	Men's 100 m freestyle	57.57	68	Did not advance			
