= Bhutan at the 1984 Summer Olympics =

- IOC code: BHU
- NOC: Bhutan Olympic Committee
- Website: bhutanolympiccommittee.org

in Los Angeles
- Competitors: 6 in 1 sport
- Flag bearer: Thinley Dorji
- Medals: Gold 0 Silver 0 Bronze 0 Total 0

Summer Olympics appearances (overview)
- 1984; 1988; 1992; 1996; 2000; 2004; 2008; 2012; 2016; 2020; 2024

Bhutan sent a delegation to compete at the 1984 Summer Olympics in Los Angeles (LA), United States, from July 28 to August 12, 1984. It was the nation's debut appearance at the Summer Olympics. Thinley Dorji served as the team's flag-bearer. The delegation consisted of six athletes competing in archery. Bhutan did not win any medals at LA. Overall, the nation's best result was Sonam Chuki, who finished 43rd, and its worst was Lhendup Tshering, who finished 60th.

== Background ==
The Bhutan Olympic Committee was recognized by the International Olympic Committee in 1983. Bhutan participation in the Games marked their debut appearance at the Summer Olympics. Bhutan has yet to win an Olympic medal. Archery is the country's national sport. It was declared the national sport in 1971, when the country became a member of the United Nations.

The 1984 Summer Olympics were held from July 28 to August 12, 1984 in Los Angeles, United States. The Bhutanese delegation consisted of six archers. Thinley Dorji was chosen as the flag-bearer for the opening ceremony. The fact that women competed was controversial, due to traditional Bhutanese archery barring them to competing.

== Competitors ==
This was Thinley Dorji's first appearance at the Olympics. However, he would later participate in the 1988 Olympic Games, placing 73rd in the men's individual archery event. It was Nawang Pelzang's first and only Olympics. He had won the Bhutan National Archery Championship five years earlier, in 1979. It was also the first and only Olympics for Lhendup Tshering, Sonam Chuki, Rinzi Lham, and Karma Chhoden. As of 2024, Lham is the youngest Bhutanese competitor to compete at the Summer Olympics, she was 16 years and 304 days old at the time of her participation. The competitors were selected from the 38 competitors at the 1979 Bhutan National Archery Championship.

== Archery ==
Points for archery were calculated in a format called the double FITA round, which included 288 arrows shot at four different distances over two rounds: 90 meters, 70 meters, 50 meters, 30 meters for men, and which included 288 arrows shot at four different distances over two rounds: 70 meters, 60 meters, 50 meters, 30 meters for women.

Men

Bhutan was represented by three male archers at the Games: Dorji, Pelzang, and Tshering. In the first round, Dorji scored 1,134 points to finish 53rd, Pelzang came 56th with 1,118 points, and Tshering's score was 1,021, which placed him in 60th. In the second round, Dorji scored 1,164 points to finish 48th, Pelzang came 54th with 1,103 points, and Tshering's score was 976, which placed him in 60th again. Overall, Dorji came 53rd with 2,298 points, Pelzang earned himself 55th with 2,221 points, and Tshering came 60th with 1,997.

Athlete	Event	First round		Second round		Final Total	
Athlete	Event	Score	Rank	Score	Rank	Score	Rank
Thinley Dorji	Individual	1134	53	1164	48	2298	53
Nawang Pelzang	Individual	1118	56	1103	54	2221	55
Lhendup Tshering	Individual	1021	60	976	60	1997	60

Women

Bhutan was represented by three female archers at the Games: Chuki, Lham, and Chhoden. In the first round, Chuki scored 1,122 points to come 42nd, Lham came 44th with 1,106 points, and Chhoden's score was 1,048, which placed her in 46th. In the second round, Chuki scored 1,072 points to come 44th, Lham came 43rd with 1,103 points, and Chodden's score was 1,038, which placed her in 46th again. Overall, Chuki came 43rd with 2,194 points, Lham finished 44th with 2,183 points, and Chhoden came 46th with 2,086.

Athlete	Event	First round		Second round		Final Total	
Athlete	Event	Score	Rank	Score	Rank	Score	Rank
Sonam Chuki	Individual	1122	42	1072	44	2194	43
Rinzi Lham	Individual	1106	44	1077	43	2183	44
Karma Chhoden	Individual	1048	46	1038	46	2086	46

== Sources ==
- Official Olympic Reports
