= Bhutan at the 2012 Summer Olympics =

- IOC code: BHU
- NOC: Bhutan Olympic Committee
- Website: bhutanolympiccommittee.org

in London
- Competitors: 2 in 2 sports
- Flag bearer: Sherab Zam
- Medals: Gold 0 Silver 0 Bronze 0 Total 0

Summer Olympics appearances (overview)
- 1984; 1988; 1992; 1996; 2000; 2004; 2008; 2012; 2016; 2020; 2024

Bhutan competed at the 2012 Summer Olympics in London, from 27 July to 12 August 2012. This marked the nation's eighth appearance at the Summer Olympics since its debut in the 1984 Summer Olympics, and the first in which the nation competed in a sport other than archery. The Bhutanese delegation included archer Sherab Zam and shooter Kunzang Choden. Zam was the flag bearer for both the opening and closing ceremonies. Neither of Bhutan's athletes progressed beyond the first round of their events. Bhutan was one of only two countries to have a female-only team at the 2012 Games.

== Background ==
Bhutan, a country in Southern Asia, participated in eight Summer Olympic games between its debut in the 1984 Summer Olympics in Los Angeles, United States and the 2012 Summer Olympics in London, The highest number of Bhutanese athletes participating in a summer games is six in both the 1984 Summer Olympics and the 1992 Summer Olympics in Barcelona, Spain. As of 2012, no Bhutanese athlete has ever won a medal at the Olympics. Two athletes from Bhutan qualified for the London games; Sherab Zam in the women's individual archery competition and Kunzang Choden in the women's 10-metre air rifle. Zam qualified after receiving a wild-card place from the Tripartite Commission. Choden also received a wild-card place for her entry. The two athletes were accompanied by their coaches; Tshering Choden for Zam and Dorji Phurba for Choden; as well as several Bhutan Olympic Committee officials. Bhutan, along with Chad, was one of only two nations with only female athletes at the 2012 games.

== Archery ==
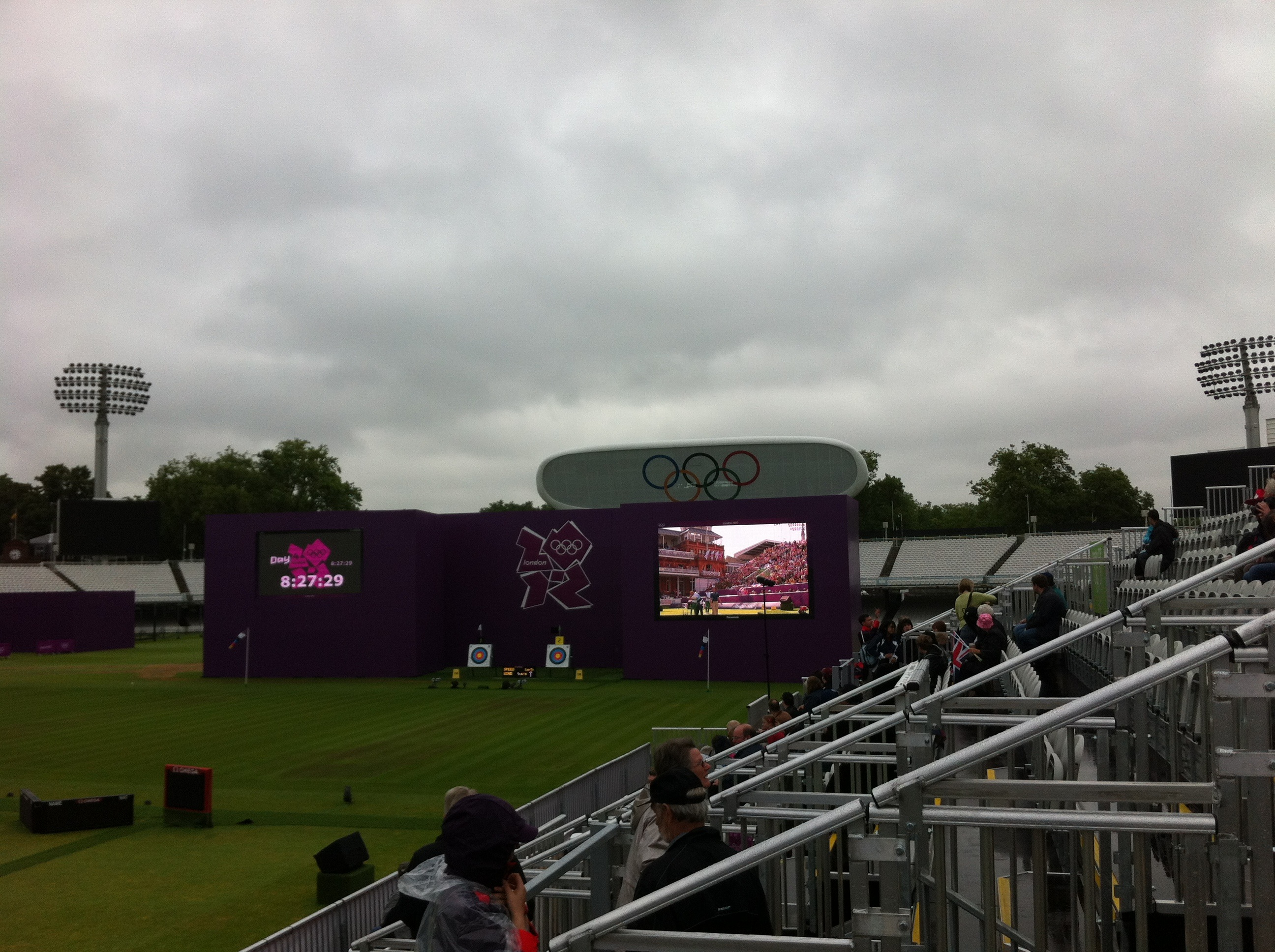
The Lord's Cricket Ground, where Zam competed in her events

The 2012 Summer Games marked Sherab Zam's Olympic debut. She was the flag bearer at both the opening and closing ceremonies. She qualified for the individual archery competition after receiving a wildcard from the Tripartite Commission. In an interview with Reuters before the games Zam said that "Participation is more important than winning a medal." Zam spent time in South Korea and India preparing for the games. The archery events at the 2012 games were held at the Lord's Cricket Ground. Zam competed on 27 July in the ranking round, finishing 61st out of 64 competitors with 589 points. She scored 82 points less than the leading competitor, Ki Bo-bae of South Korea. Zam competed against American Khatuna Lorig, the fourth ranking athlete in the ranking round, in the round of 64. Lorig beat Zam three sets to none in about six minutes. This meant Zam was eliminated from the competition. After the games Zam said: "I am not that good at archery but I love it. It was so good to meet world ranking archers who are famous and to watch how they do it. I have learnt a lot from them," and that, "When I grew up I never dreamt I would come to London, let alone compete in an Olympics. This just shows that anything is possible. The Olympics is great for that."

Athlete	Event	Ranking round		Round of 64	Round of 32	Round of 16	Quarterfinals	Semifinals	Final	
Athlete	Event	Score	Seed	Opposition Score	Opposition Score	Opposition Score	Opposition Score	Opposition Score	Opposition Score	Rank
Sherab Zam	Women's individual	589	61	Lorig (USA) (4); L 0–6	Did not advance					

== Shooting ==
Kunzang Choden also made her Olympic debut at the 2012 games. She qualified for the 10-metre air rifle event after receiving a wild card from the Tripartite Commission. Before the games Choden said that, "Bhutan is just a small country of just 700,000. There is a lot of pressure on us but we must be realistic about our chances. We just want to do well." Choden spent time in Germany and Bangladesh preparing for the games. On 28 July Choden competed in the qualification round of her event. She finished 56th out of 56 athletes with a score of 381 points. She scored 18 points less the two equal highest scoring athlete, Sylwia Bogacka of Poland and Yi Siling of China. Choden scored 16 points less than Czech Kateřina Emmons who was the lowest scoring qualifier for the final and therefore her competition ended at the qualifying round. In an interview with Reuters after the games Choden said: "I really enjoyed it. Now we can see how hard we need to work to be really good."

Athlete	Event	Qualification		Final	
Athlete	Event	Points	Rank	Points	Rank
Kunzang Choden	Women's 10 m air rifle	381	56	Did not advance	
