= Tshering =

Tshering is a surname. Notable people with the surname include:

- Tshering Pem (born 1957), Bhutanese Queen Mother
- Tshering Yangdon (born 1959), Bhutanese Queen Mother
- Lotay Tshering (born 1969), Bhutanese politician and surgeon
- Batoo Tshering (born 1951), Bhutanese military person
- Pem Tshering (born 1975), Bhutanese female archer
- Lhendup Tshering (born 1947), Bhutanese male archer
- Pema Tshering (born 1951), Bhutanese male archer
- Jigme Tshering (born 1959), Bhutanese male archer
- Orgyen Tshering (born 1999), Bhutanese footballer
- Tandin Tshering (born 1986), Bhutanese footballer
