= Bhutan at the 2004 Summer Olympics =

- IOC code: BHU
- NOC: Bhutan Olympic Committee
- Website: bhutanolympiccommittee.org

in Athens
- Competitors: 2 in 1 sport
- Flag bearers: Tshering Choden; Tashi Peljor
- Medals: Gold 0 Silver 0 Bronze 0 Total 0

Summer Olympics appearances (overview)
- 1984; 1988; 1992; 1996; 2000; 2004; 2008; 2012; 2016; 2020; 2024

Bhutan competed at the 2004 Summer Olympics in Athens, Greece, which took place from 13 to 29 August 2004. It was the nation's sixth consecutive appearance at the Summer Olympics since its debut in 1984. The delegation consisted of two athletes competing in one sport: Tshering Choden and Tashi Peljor in archery. Bhutan did not win any medals at Athens, nor in any previous Olympics. Choden served as the team's flagbearer in the opening ceremony, while Peljor held the flag at the closing ceremony.

Peljor defeated Jocelyn de Grandis and advanced to the Round of 32, where he lost to Anton Prylepau, 152–155. Choden won against Lin Sang and advanced to the Round of 32, where she tied Reena Kumari 134–134 before losing in a 4–7 tiebreaker.

== Background ==
The Bhutan Olympic Committee was created in 1983. The participation of Bhutan at the Athens Summer Olympics marked their sixth consecutive summer appearance since the country's debut in the 1984 Summer Olympics. Bhutan had never won an Olympic medal. Archery is the country's national sport.

The 2004 Summer Olympics were held from 13 to 29 August 2004 in Athens, Greece. Bhutan sent a delegation of two athletes. Tshering Choden served as the team's flagbearer in the opening ceremony, while Tashi Peljor held the flag at the closing ceremony.

== Competitors ==
Bhutan was represented by one male and one female athlete at the 2004 Summer Olympics in archery: Tashi Peljor in the men's individual, and Tshering Choden in the women's individual.

This was Peljor's debut appearance at the Olympics. He later competed in the men's individual archery event at the 2008 Summer Olympics, where he tied for 56th place.

This was Choden's second appearance at the Olympics. She had first competed in the women's individual archery event at the 2000 Summer Olympics, placing 43rd. She later retired from archery in 2005 but returned to the sport as a coach in 2007. She coached the only Bhutanese archer at the 2012 Olympic Games, Sherab Zam.

Sport	Men	Women	Total
Archery	1	1	2
Total	1	1	2

== Archery ==
On 12 August, Peljor participated in the ranking round of the men's individual. He scored 627 points and placed in the 52nd seed. On 16 August, he participated in the Round of 64 against Jocelyn de Grandis and won 161–136, which The Washington Post called "the biggest upset of the day". Peljor then advanced to the Round of 32, where he lost to Anton Prylepau, 152–155 on 17 August.

This was Choden's second appearance at the Olympics. On 12 August, she participated in the ranking round of the women's individual. She scored 600 points and placed in the 54th seed. On 15 August, she participated in the Round of 64 against Lin Sang and won 159–156, advancing to the Round of 32. In that round she tied Reena Kumari, 134–134 on 17 August; in the tiebreaker she lost 4–7.

Athlete	Event	Ranking round		Round of 64	Round of 32	Round of 16	Quarterfinals	Semifinals	Final / BM	
Athlete	Event	Score	Seed	Opposition Score	Opposition Score	Opposition Score	Opposition Score	Opposition Score	Opposition Score	Rank
Tashi Peljor	Men's individual	627	52	de Grandis (FRA); W 161–136	Prylepau (BLR); L 152–155	did not advance				
Tshering Choden	Women's individual	600	54	Lin (CHN); W 159–156	Kumari (IND); L 134 (4)–134 (7)	did not advance				

As of 2020, these were the best Olympic results in archery that Bhutan had achieved.
