= Bhutan at the 2000 Summer Olympics =

- IOC code: BHU
- NOC: Bhutan Olympic Committee
- Website: bhutanolympiccommittee.org

in Sydney
- Competitors: 2 in 1 sport
- Flag bearer: Jubzhang Jubzhang
- Medals: Gold 0 Silver 0 Bronze 0 Total 0

Summer Olympics appearances (overview)
- 1984; 1988; 1992; 1996; 2000; 2004; 2008; 2012; 2016; 2020; 2024

Bhutan competed at the 2000 Summer Olympics in Sydney, Australia, from 15 September to 1 October 2000. It was the nation's fifth consecutive appearance at the Summer Olympics since its debut in 1984. The delegation consisted of two athletes competing in one sport: Jubzhang Jubzhang and Tshering Choden in archery. Bhutan did not win any medals during these Olympics. Jubzhang was chosen as the flag bearer for the opening ceremony. Thus, Bhutan had yet to win an Olympic medal.

In the ranking round of the men's individual competition, Jubzhang scored 596 points and earned himself the 55th seed. In the Round of 64, he lost 162–156 to Nico Hendrickx of Belgium, failing to advance. In the ranking round of the women's individual, Choden scored 614 points and got herself into the 50th seed. In the Round of 64, she lost 165–153 to Hamdiah Damanhuri of Indonesia, also failing to advance.

== Background ==
After the formation of the Bhutan Olympic Committee on 23 November 1983, it was recognized by the International Olympic Committee on 31 December 1982. The Kingdom first participated in the Summer Olympic Games at the 1984 Summer Olympics, and have taken part in every Summer Olympics since then, making Sydney their fifth appearance in a Summer Olympiad. They have never participated in a Winter Olympic Games.

The 2000 Summer Olympics were held from 15 September to 1 October 2000. The manager of the Bhutanese Olympic archery team, Karma Dorji, stated that he was disappointed about the size of the team being too small. He said that the team was small because Bhutanese archery is played differently and many are reluctant to switch to Olympic archery. The delegation trained in Sydney before competing Former Australian deputy prime minister, Tim Fischer, decided to support the Bhutanese team by buying tickets to watch them. He did this after he had travelled to the country and befriended Jubzhang Jubzhang. The Bhutanese delegation to Sydney consisted of two archers, Jubzhang and Tshering Choden. Jubzhang was chosen as the flag bearer for the opening ceremony.

== Competitors ==
This was Jubzhang's third appearance at the Olympics. He had previously participated in the 1992 and 1996 Olympic Games, placing 63rd and 48th in the men's individual archery events, respectively.

This was Choden's debut appearance at the Olympics. She would go on to compete in the women's individual archery event at the 2004 Summer Olympics, placing 32nd. She later retired from archery in 2005 but returned to the sport as a coach in 2007. She coached the only Bhutanese archer at the 2012 Olympic Games, Sherab Zam.

Sport	Men	Women	Total
Archery	1	1	2
Total	1	1	2

== Archery ==
Bhutan was represented by two archers at the Games: Jubzhang and Choden. In the ranking round of the men's individual competition held on 16 September, Jubzhang scored 596 points and earned himself the 55th seed. In the Round of 64, he lost 162–156 to Nico Hendrickx of Belgium, failing to advance to the Round of 32. In the ranking round of the women's individual, also held on 16 September, Choden scored 614 points and got herself into the 50th seed. In the Round of 64, she lost 165–153, to Hamdiah Damanhuri of Indonesia, also failing to advance to the next round.

Athlete	Event	Ranking round		Round of 64	Round of 32	Round of 16	Quarterfinals	Semifinals	Final / BM	
Athlete	Event	Score	Seed	Opposition Score	Opposition Score	Opposition Score	Opposition Score	Opposition Score	Opposition Score	Rank
Jubzhang Jubzhang	Men's individual	596	55	Hendrickx (BEL); L 156–162	Did not advance					
Tshering Choden	Women's individual	614	50	Damanhuri (INA); L 153–165	Did not advance					
