= Bhutan at the 1996 Summer Olympics =

- IOC code: BHU
- NOC: Bhutan Olympic Committee
- Website: bhutanolympiccommittee.org

in Atlanta
- Competitors: 2 in 1 sport
- Flag bearer: Jubzhang Jubzhang
- Medals: Gold 0 Silver 0 Bronze 0 Total 0

Summer Olympics appearances (overview)
- 1984; 1988; 1992; 1996; 2000; 2004; 2008; 2012; 2016; 2020; 2024; 2028

Bhutan sent a delegation to compete at the 1996 Summer Olympics in Atlanta, United States from 19 July to 4 August 1996. This was the Kingdom's fourth appearance at a Summer Olympic Games. The delegation to Atlanta consisted of two archers, Jubzhang Jubzhang and Ugyen Ugyen. Neither advanced past the round of 64 in their events, though Jubzhang pushed his match to a shootout.

== Background ==
The Bhutan Olympic Committee was recognized by the International Olympic Committee on 31 December 1982. The Kingdom first participated in the Summer Olympic Games at the 1984 Summer Olympics, and have taken part in every Summer Olympics since then, making Atlanta their fourth appearance in a Summer Olympiad. They have never participated in a Winter Olympic Games. The 1996 Summer Olympics were held from 19 July to 4 August 1996; 10,318 athletes represented 194 National Olympic Committees. The Bhutanese delegation to Atlanta consisted of two archers, Jubzhang Jubzhang and Ugyen Ugyen. Jubzhang was chosen as the flag bearer for the opening ceremony.

== Competitors ==
The following is the list of number of competitors in the Games.

Sport	Men	Women	Total
Archery	1	1	2
Total	1	1	2

== Archery ==
Archery is the national sport of the Kingdom. Jubzhang Jubzhang was 25 years old at the time of the Atlanta Olympics, and had previously represented Bhutan at the 1992 Summer Olympics. In the ranking round of the men's individual event, held on 28 July, he scored 643 points, earning the 49th seed out of 64 competitors. In the first round proper, he tied 156–156, and lost in a shootout 9–8 to Stanislav Zabrodsky of Ukraine. The gold medal was ultimately won by Justin Huish of the United States, the silver was taken by Magnus Petersson of Sweden, and the bronze was won by Oh Kyo-moon of South Korea.

Ugyen Ugyen was 22 years old at the time of these Olympics and was making her Olympic debut. In the women's individual, also held on 28 July, she earned 580 points in the ranking round, earning herself the 60th seed. In the first round, she lost by a score of 153–126 to Olena Sadovnycha of Ukraine. In the event overall, the gold medal was won by Kim Kyung-wook of South Korea, the silver medal was earned by He Ying of China, and the bronze medal was taken by Olena Sadovnycha of Ukraine.

Athlete	Event	Ranking round		Round of 64	Round of 32	Round of 16	Quarterfinals	Semifinals	Final / BM	
Athlete	Event	Score	Seed	Opposition Score	Opposition Score	Opposition Score	Opposition Score	Opposition Score	Opposition Score	Rank
Jubzhang Jubzhang	Men's individual	643	49	Zabrodsky (UKR); L 156–156	did not advance					
Ugyen Ugyen	Women's individual	580	60	Sadovnycha (UKR); L 126–153	did not advance					

== See also ==
- Archery in Bhutan
