= Bhutan at the 1992 Summer Olympics =

- IOC code: BHU
- NOC: Bhutan Olympic Committee
- Website: bhutanolympiccommittee.org

in Barcelona
- Competitors: 6 (3 men and 3 women) in 1 sport
- Flag bearer: Jubzhang Jubzhang
- Medals: Gold 0 Silver 0 Bronze 0 Total 0

Summer Olympics appearances (overview)
- 1984; 1988; 1992; 1996; 2000; 2004; 2008; 2012; 2016; 2020; 2024

Bhutan sent a delegation to compete at the 1992 Summer Olympics in Barcelona, Spain from 25 July to 9 August 1992. It was the nation's third consecutive appearance at the Summer Olympics since its debut in 1984. The delegation consisted of six athletes competing in one sport, archery. Bhutan did not win any medals at Barcelona, nor in any previous Olympics. Jubzhang Jubzhang served as the team's flagbearer in the opening ceremony.

None of the Bhutanese archers advanced past the ranking round, both as teams and individuals. The Bhutanese women's team was the only team to not advance to the Round of 16 in their event. Two of the archers were competing in their second Olympics. For the rest, this was their first and only time competing.

== Background ==
The Bhutan Olympic Committee was recognized by the International Olympic Committee on 31 December 1982. The participation of Bhutan at the Barcelona Summer Olympics marked their third consecutive summer appearance since the country's debut in the 1984 Summer Olympics. They have never participated in a Winter Olympic Games. Bhutan had never won an Olympic medal. Archery is the country's national sport.

The 1992 Summer Olympics were held from 25 July to 9 August 1992 in Barcelona, Spain. The Bhutanese delegation to the Games consisted of six archers. Jubzhang Jubzhang was chosen as the flag bearer for the opening ceremony.

== Competitors ==
This was Jubzhang's second appearance at the Olympics. He had previously participated in the 1988 Olympic Games placing 63rd in the men's individual archery events. He would later compete in the 2000 Olympics, getting 43rd. It was Pema Tshering's second time competing after 1988, where he placed 76th. It was Karma Tenzin's, Karma Tshomo's, Pem Tshering's, and Namgyal Lhamu's first and only appearance.

Sport	Men	Women	Total
Archery	3	3	6
Total	3	3	6

== Archery ==
Men

Bhutan was represented by three male archers at the Games; Jubzhang, Tenzin, and Pema Tshering. In the ranking round of the men's individual competition held on 31 July, Jubzhang scored 1,221 points, placing 63rd, Tenzin scored 1,162 and placed 71st, and Tshering scored 1,069, coming 75th and last. None of them qualified for the Round of 32, which took the top 32 ranked players from the round. The three also competed in the team event, coming last and 20th in the ranking round, scoring 3,452 points as a team. They failed to advance to the next round as they were not in the top 16.

Athlete	Event	Ranking round		Round of 32		Round of 16		Quarter-final		Semi-final		Final	
Athlete	Event	Score	Rank	Score	Rank	Score	Rank	Score	Rank	Score	Rank	Score	Rank
Jubzang Jubzang	Individual	1211	63	Did not advance									
Karma Tenzin	Individual	1162	71	Did not advance									
Pema Tshering	Individual	1069	75	Did not advance									
Jubzang Jubzang; Karma Tenzin; Pema Tshering	Team	3452	20	N/A		Did not advance							

Women

Bhutan was represented by three female archers at the Games; Tshomo, Pem Tshering, and Lhamu. In the ranking round of the women's individual competition held on 31 July, Tshomo scored 1,160 points, placing 58th, Tshering scored 1,129 and placed 60th, and Tshering scored 1,047, coming 61st and last. None of them qualified for the Round of 32, which took the top 32 ranked players from the round. The three also competed in the team event, coming last and 17th in the ranking round, scoring 3,336 points as a team. They failed to advance to the next round as they were the only country not in the top 16.

Athlete	Event	Ranking round		Round of 32		Round of 16		Quarter-final		Semi-final		Final	
Athlete	Event	Score	Rank	Score	Rank	Score	Rank	Score	Rank	Score	Rank	Score	Rank
Karma Tshomo	Individual	1160	58	Did not advance									
Pem Tshering	Individual	1129	60	Did not advance									
Namgyal Lhamu	Individual	1047	61	Did not advance									
Karma Tshomo; Pem Tshering; Namgyal Lhamu	Team	3336	17	N/A				Did not advance					
