= Bhutan at the 2024 Summer Olympics =

- IOC code: BHU
- NOC: Bhutan Olympic Committee
- Website: bhutanolympiccommittee.org

in Paris, France 26 July 2024 – 11 August 2024
- Competitors: 3 (2 men and 1 woman) in 3 sports
- Flag bearers (opening): Sangay Tenzin & Kinzang Lhamo
- Flag bearer (closing): Kinzang Lhamo
- Medals: Gold 0 Silver 0 Bronze 0 Total 0

Summer Olympics appearances (overview)
- 1984; 1988; 1992; 1996; 2000; 2004; 2008; 2012; 2016; 2020; 2024; 2028

Bhutan competed at the 2024 Summer Olympics in Paris, France, from 26 July to 11 August 2024. It was the nation's eleventh consecutive appearance at the Summer Olympics since its debut in 1984. The delegation consisted of three athletes competing in three sports. Bhutan did not win any medals during the Paris Olympics. Sangay Tenzin and Kinzang Lhamo served as the team's flagbearers in the 2024 opening ceremony, while Lhamo was the sole flagbearer in the closing ceremony. Lhamo received a standing ovation for her determination in finishing the women's marathon despite finishing in last place.

== Background ==
The Bhutan Olympic Committee was created on 23 November 1983. The appearance of Bhutan at the Paris Summer Olympics marked their 11th consecutive summer appearance since it first entered the Games during the 1984 Summer Olympics. Bhutan participated for the first time in the 1984 Olympic Games held in Los Angeles when three male and three female archers represented Bhutan. Bhutan has never won an Olympic medal.

The 2024 Summer Olympics were held from 26 July to 11 August 2024 in Paris, France. Bhutan sent a delegation of three athletes. Sangay Tenzin and Kinzang Lhamo served as the team's flagbearers in the 2024 opening ceremony, while Lhamo was the sole flagbearer in the closing ceremony.

== Competitors ==
The following is the list of number of competitors in the Games.

Sport	Men	Women	Total
Archery	1	0	1
Athletics	0	1	1
Swimming	1	0	1
Total	2	1	3

== Archery ==
Bhutan was represented by one male athlete at the 2024 Summer Olympics in archery: Lam Dorji in the men's individual. He qualified via universality place, (Note: Universality places are places awarded to countries that send small delegations to the Olympics. They let the nations' best athlete qualify for the Olympics.) which was given to him because of his performance in the final world qualifier in Antalya. This was Dorji's debut appearance at the Olympics. On 30 July, he participated in the Round of 64 of the men's individual. He went up against Alessandro Paoli and lost 3–7, failing to advance to the Round of 32.

Key

- Note–Ranks given for track events are within the athlete's heat only
- Q = Qualified for the next round
- q = Qualified for the next round as a fastest loser or, in field events, by position without achieving the qualifying target
- NR = National record
- N/A = Round not applicable for the event
- Bye = Athlete not required to compete in round

Athlete	Event	Ranking round		Round of 64	Round of 32	Round of 16	Quarterfinals	Semifinals	Final / BM	
Athlete	Event	Score	Seed	Opposition Score	Opposition Score	Opposition Score	Opposition Score	Opposition Score	Opposition Score	Rank
Lam Dorji	Men's individual	663	28	Paoli (ITA); L 3–7	Did not advance					

== Athletics ==
Bhutan was represented by one female athlete at the 2024 Summer Olympics in athletics: Kinzang Lhamo in the women's marathon. She qualified via universality place. (Note: Universality places are places awarded to countries that send small delegations to the Olympics. They let the nations' best athlete qualify for the Olympics.) This was Lhamo's debut appearance at the Olympics. On 11 August, she participated in the women's marathon. It marked her first competition outside of Bhutan. In preparation for the event, Lhamo trained in Thimphu with the help of the Bhutan Amateur Athletic Federation. She completed the marathon in 79th place with a time of 3:52:59; despite finishing in last place, she received a standing ovation from spectators, praising her willing determination to finish the event.

Track and road events

Athlete	Event	Final	
Athlete	Event	Result	Rank
Kinzang Lhamo	Women's marathon	3:52:59	79

== Swimming ==
Bhutan was represented by one male athlete at the 2024 Summer Olympics in swimming: Sangay Tenzin in the men's 100 m freestyle. He qualified via universality place. This was Tenzin's second appearance at the Olympics. On 30 July, he participated in the heats of the men's 100 metre freestyle in heat one. He finished the race in 56.08 seconds, third out of seven competitors in his heat and 74th overall, and failed to advanced to the semifinals.

Athlete	Event	Heat		Semifinal		Final	
Athlete	Event	Time	Rank	Time	Rank	Time	Rank
Sangay Tenzin	Men's 100 m freestyle	56.08	74	Did not advance			

Qualifiers for the latter rounds (Q) of all events were decided on a time only basis, therefore positions shown are overall results versus competitors in all heats.
