= Bhutan at the 2016 Summer Olympics =

- IOC code: BHU
- NOC: Bhutan Olympic Committee
- Website: bhutanolympiccommittee.org

in Rio de Janeiro
- Competitors: 2 in 2 sports
- Flag bearers: Karma (opening); Kunzang Lenchu (closing)
- Medals: Gold 0 Silver 0 Bronze 0 Total 0

Summer Olympics appearances (overview)
- 1984; 1988; 1992; 1996; 2000; 2004; 2008; 2012; 2016; 2020; 2024

The national flag of Bhutan, as it was shown during the games.

Bhutan competed at the 2016 Summer Olympics in Rio de Janeiro, which was held from 5 to 21 August, 2016. The country's participation in Rio de Janeiro marked its ninth appearance in the Summer Olympics since its début at the 1984 Summer Olympics. The delegation included two female athletes, Karma in the women's individual archery tournament and Kunzang Lenchu in the women's 10 metre air rifle shooting contest. Both qualified for the Games through wildcard places because they did not match the required qualification standards. Karma was selected as the flag bearer for the opening ceremony while Lenchu held it at the closing ceremony. Karma was eliminated at the Round of 64 while Lenchu exited the competition after the shooting qualification round.

== Background ==
Bhutan, a country in Southern Asia, participated in nine Summer Olympic Games between its debut in the 1984 Summer Olympics in Los Angeles, United States and the 2016 Summer Olympics in Rio de Janeiro, Brazil. The highest number of Bhutanese athletes participating in a Summer Games is six in both the 1984 Summer Olympics and the 1992 Summer Olympics in Barcelona, Spain. Bhutan competed at the Rio Summer Games from 5 to 21 August 2016. No Bhutanese athlete has ever won a medal at the Olympics. The two athletes who were selected to represent Bhutan at the Rio Games were Karma in the women's individual archery tournament and Kunzang Lenchu in the women's 10 metre air rifle shooting contest. Along with the two athletes, the Secretary General of Bhutan's Olympic Committee, and two coaches, the country's delegation was led by the heir presumptive to the Bhutan throne Jigyel Ugyen Wangchuck. Karma was selected as the flag bearer for the opening ceremony while Lenchu held it at the closing ceremony.

== Archery ==
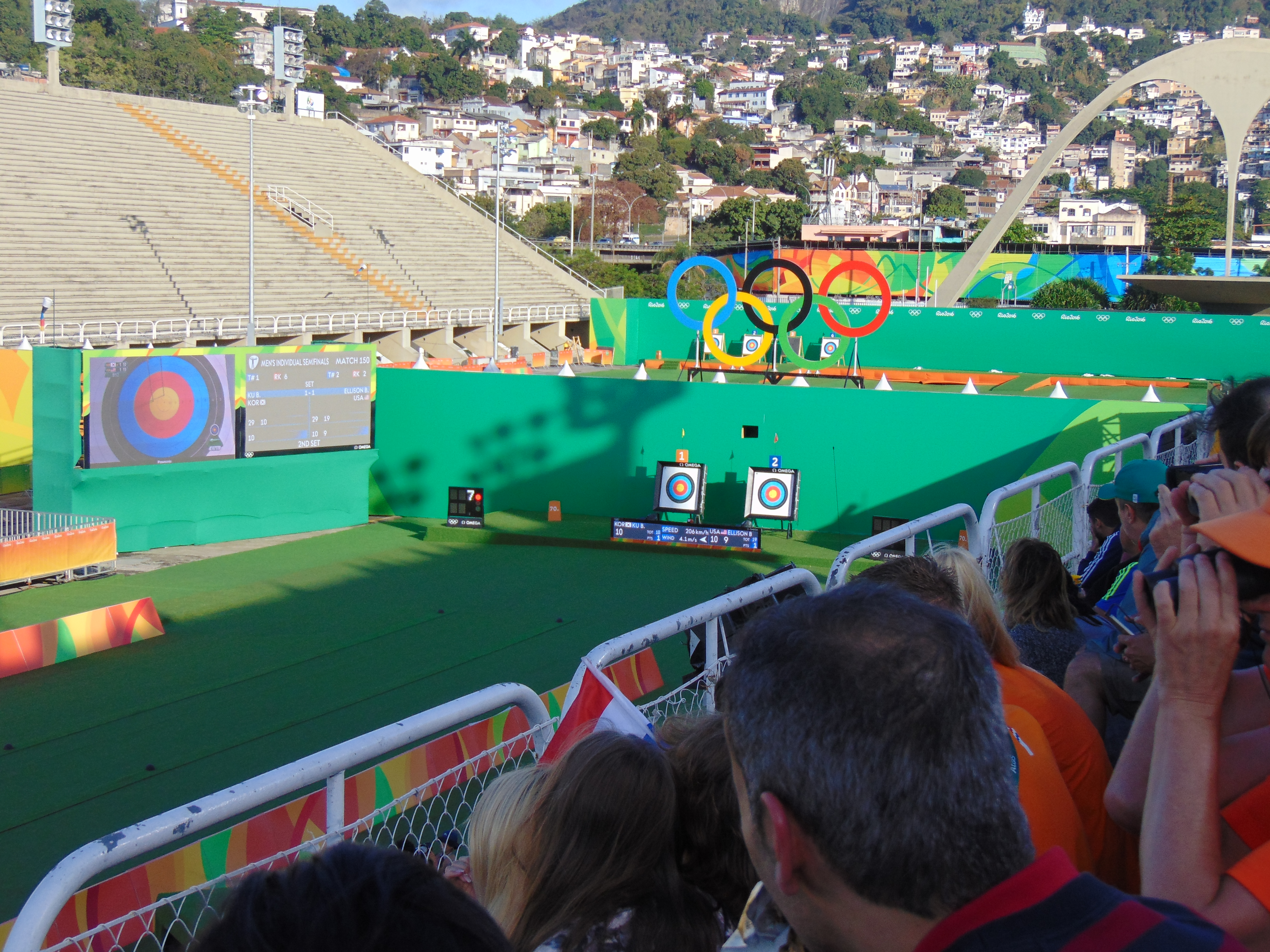
The Sambódromo, where Karma competed in Archery events.

The 2016 Summer Games marked Karma's Olympic début. She qualified for the women's individual archery tournament after receiving a wildcard from the Tripartite Commission in June 2016 based on her results at the 2015 Asian Archery Championships and the 2016 Archery World Cup qualification event in Antalya. In an interview with Kuensel before the Games, Karma said: "I'm very excited and nervous at the same time. It is time for me to show what I've learned so far against the world's best archers", and to Archer 360, "While in the Sambodromo, I'm hoping to make my country proud. I have a good chance if I am able to maintain my home scores." She competed on 5 August in the ranking round, finishing 60th out of 64th competitors with 588 points. Karma scored 81 points less than the leading competitor, South Korea's Choi Mi-sun. On 8 August she competed in the Round of 64 and was drawn against Tuyana Dashidorzhieva of Russia, the fifth ranking athlete in the ranking round. Karma tied with Dashidorzhieva in the first set before the Russian outscored her by three points to secure the second set. Karma and Dashidorzieva tied with each other in the game's following two sets until the Russian won the final set to win the match. This meant Karma was eliminated from the competition. After the events ended, Karma stated that despite being defeated she enjoyed the match and wanted to compete with archery champions whether she won or lost: "I remember being a bit nervous with the big cameras in the blinds. But I felt excited that it was the first time in my life that this would happen,"

Athlete	Event	Ranking round		Round of 64	Round of 32	Round of 16	Quarterfinals	Semifinals	Final / BM	
Athlete	Event	Score	Seed	Opposition Score	Opposition Score	Opposition Score	Opposition Score	Opposition Score	Opposition Score	Rank
Karma	Women's individual	588	60	Dashidorzhieva (RUS); L 3–7	Did not advance					

== Shooting ==
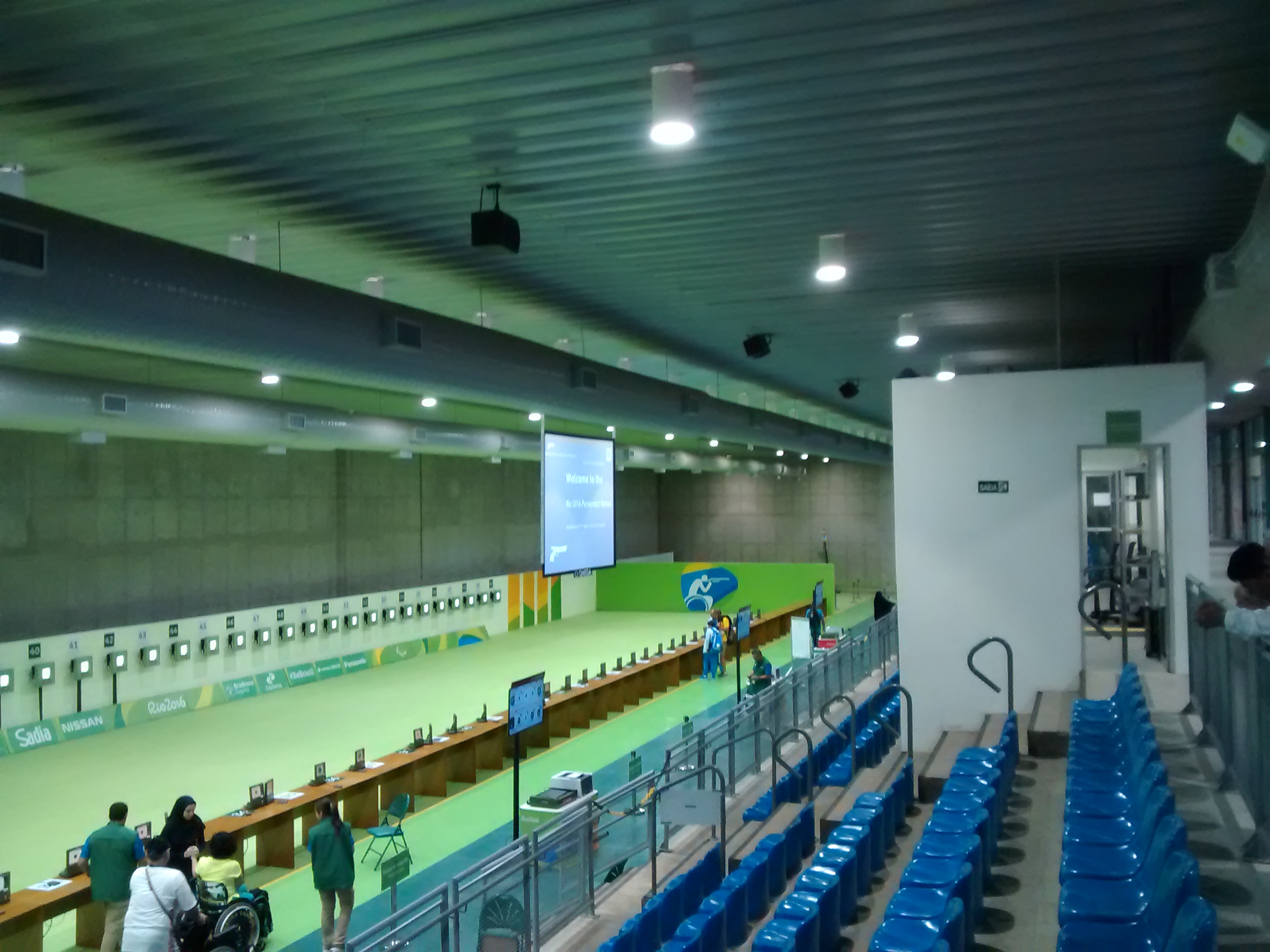
The National Shooting Center, where Lenchu participated in shooting events.

Kunzang Lenchu also made her first appearance in the Olympics at the 2016 Games. She qualified for the women's 10 metre air rifle shooting tournament after being awarded a wildcard place from the Tripartite Commission. Lenchu spent time in India preparing for the Games because of a lack of shooting facilities in Bhutan. Before the Games she said that she was disappointed at finishing 12th at the South Asian Games in her contest and affirmed she would "do her best" at the Olympics. On 6 August Lenchu competed in the qualification round of the women's 10 metre air rifle. She finished 45th out of 51 athletes with a score of 404.9 points. She scored 16 points less than the highest-scoring competitor, Du Li of China. Lenchu scored two 11 points less than Yi Siling from China who was the lowest scoring qualifier and therefore her competition ended at the qualifying round.

Athlete	Event	Qualification		Final	
Athlete	Event	Points	Rank	Points	Rank
Kunzang Lenchu	Women's 10 m air rifle	404.9	45	Did not advance	

Qualification Legend: Q = Qualify for the next round; q = Qualify for the bronze medal (shotgun)
