= Bhutan at the 2008 Summer Olympics =

- IOC code: BHU
- NOC: Bhutan Olympic Committee
- Website: bhutanolympiccommittee.org

in Beijing
- Competitors: 2 in 1 sport
- Flag bearer: Tashi Peljor
- Medals: Gold 0 Silver 0 Bronze 0 Total 0

Summer Olympics appearances (overview)
- 1984; 1988; 1992; 1996; 2000; 2004; 2008; 2012; 2016; 2020; 2024

Bhutan sent a delegation to compete in the 2008 Summer Olympics, held in Beijing, People's Republic of China from 8–24 August 2008. This was Bhutan's seventh time participating in a Summer Olympic Games. The delegation consisted of two archers, Tashi Peljor and Dorji Dema. Neither was able to win their first round match.

== Background ==
The Bhutan Olympic Committee was recognized by the International Olympic Committee on 31 December 1982. The Kingdom first participated in the Summer Olympic Games at the 1984 Summer Olympics, and have taken part in every Summer Olympics since then, making Beijing their seventh appearance in a Summer Olympiad. They have never participated in a Winter Olympic Games. The 2008 Summer Olympics were held from 8–24 August 2008; a total of 10,942 athletes represented 204 National Olympic Committees. The Bhutanese delegation consisted of two archers, Tashi Peljor and Dorji Dema. Peljor was the flag bearer for the opening ceremony and the closing ceremony.

== Archery ==
Bhutan sent archers to the Olympics for the seventh time. The Tripartite Commission awards universality places, including three of each gender for archery to nations not otherwise qualified; they awarded Bhutan one of its invitation spots in each of the men's and women's competitions. Bhutan's competitors were Tashi Peljor in the men's individual and Dorji Dema in the women's individual.

Peljor was 30 years old at the time of the Beijing Olympics, and had previously represented Bhutan at the 2004 Summer Olympics. In the ranking round of the men's individual competition he scored 632 points and earned himself the 54th seed. In the first round of the knockout phase, he lost 110–100 to Wang Cheng-pang of Chinese Taipei. The gold medal was eventually won by Viktor Ruban of Ukraine, the silver medal was earned by Park Kyung-mo of South Korea, and the bronze was won by Bair Badënov of Russia.

Dema was 24 years old at the time of these Olympics and was making her Olympic debut. In the ranking round of the women's individual, she scored 567 points and slotted herself into the 61st seed. In the first knockout round, she lost, 109–107, to Khatuna Narimanidze of Georgia. The gold medal was eventually won by Zhang Juanjuan of China, the silver was taken by Park Sung-hyun of South Korea, and the bronze by her fellow South Korean Yun Ok-hee.

Athlete	Event	Ranking round		Round of 64	Round of 32	Round of 16	Quarterfinals	Semifinals	Final / BM	
Athlete	Event	Score	Seed	Opposition Score	Opposition Score	Opposition Score	Opposition Score	Opposition Score	Opposition Score	Rank
Tashi Peljor	Men's individual	632	54	Wang C-P (TPE); L 100–110	did not advance					
Dorji Dema	Women's individual	567	61	Narimanidze (GEO); L 107–109	did not advance					

== See also ==
- Archery in Bhutan
