= Kunzang (name) =

Kunzang is a Tibetan name which usually means one which is good in all/good to all. It may refer to

- Kunzang (1445–c.1479), Tibetan prince
- Kunzang Dekyong Wangmo (1892–1940), Tibetan Buddhist teacher
- Kunzang Bhutia (born 1994), Indian football goalkeeper
- Kunzang Choden (born 1952), Bhutanese writer
- Kunzang Choden (sport shooter) (born 1984), Bhutanese sports shooter
- Lenchu Kunzang (born 1992), Bhutanese sports shooter

== See also ==
- Kunzang Palyul Choling, a center for Buddhist study in Maryland, U.S.
