= Bhutan at the 1988 Summer Olympics =

- IOC code: BHU
- NOC: Bhutan Olympic Committee
- Website: bhutanolympiccommittee.org

in Seoul
- Competitors: 3 in 1 sport
- Flag bearer: Pema Tshering
- Medals: Gold 0 Silver 0 Bronze 0 Total 0

Summer Olympics appearances (overview)
- 1984; 1988; 1992; 1996; 2000; 2004; 2008; 2012; 2016; 2020; 2024

Bhutan sent a delegation to compete at the 1988 Summer Olympics in Seoul, South Korea from 17 September to 2 October 1988. It was the nation's second consecutive appearance at the Summer Olympics since its debut in 1984. The delegation consisted of three athletes competing in one sport, archery. Bhutan did not win any medals at Seoul, nor in any previous Olympics. Pema Tshering served as the team's flag-bearer in the opening ceremony.

None of the Bhutanese archers advanced past the ranking round, both as teams and individuals. As individuals, their best placement was 73rd with 1,144 points and the lowest was 80th with 1,070 points. As a team, their placement was 22nd with 3,338 points. One of the archers was competing in his second Olympics. One would later compete in the 1992 Olympics, and for the other it was his only time competing.

== Background ==
The Bhutan Olympic Committee was recognized by the International Olympic Committee in 1983. The participation of Bhutan at the Seoul Summer Olympics marked their second consecutive summer appearance since the country's debut in the 1984 Summer Olympics. As of 2025, they have never participated in a Winter Olympic Games. Bhutan has yet to win an Olympic medal. Archery is the country's national sport.

The 1988 Summer Olympics were held from 17 September to 2 October 1988 in Seoul, South Korea. The Bhutanese delegation to the Games consisted of three archers. Pema Tshering was chosen as the flag-bearer for the opening ceremony. At these Olympics, South Korea organised a program where they would send members of Korean companies to cheer on smaller teams as they did not have much support. Bhutan was supported by representatives from Hyundai.

== Competitors ==
This was Thinley Dorji's second appearance at the Olympics. He had previously participated in the 1984 Olympic Games, placing 53rd in the men's individual archery event. It was Pema Tshering's first time competing, however he would later compete in 1992, where he would place 75th. It was Jigme Tshering's first and only Olympics.

Sport	Men	Women	Total
Archery	3	0	3
Total	3	0	3

== Archery ==
Bhutan was represented by three male archers at the Games; Jubzhang, Tenzin, and Pema Tshering. In the ranking round of the men's individual competition held on 27 September, Dorji scored 1,144 points, placing 73rd, Pema Tshering scored 1,124 and placed 76th, and Jigme Tshering scored 1,070, coming 80th. None of them qualified to forward to Round One, which took the top 24 ranked players from the round. The three also competed in the team event, coming last and 22nd in the ranking round, scoring 3,338 points as a team. They failed to advance to the next round as they were not in the top 12.

Men

Athlete	Event	Ranking round		Round of 16		Quarterfinal		Semifinal		Final	
Athlete	Event	Score	Rank	Score	Rank	Score	Rank	Score	Rank	Score	Rank
Thinley Dorji	Individual	1144	73	Did not advance							
Pema Tshering	Individual	1124	76	Did not advance							
Jigme Tshering	Individual	1070	80	Did not advance							
Thinley Dorji Jigme Tshering; Pema Tshering	Team	3338	22	N/A				Did not advance			
