= Diaz Kusumawardani =

Indonesian sports shooter (born 1995)

Personal information
- Born: 2 November 1995 (age 30) Surabaya, Indonesia

Sport
- Sport: Sports shooting
Medal record
Representing Indonesia
ISSF Grand Prix
Gold medal – first place	2022 Jakarta	50 m rifle 3 positions team
Gold medal – first place	2022 Jakarta	50 m rifle 3 positions mixed team
Silver medal – second place	2022 Jakarta	50 m rifle 3 positions

Diaz Kusumawardani (born 2 November 1995) is an Indonesian sports shooter. She competed in the Women's 10 metre air rifle event at the 2012 Summer Olympics, and came in 55th out of 56 competitors.
