= Gelephu Mindfulness City =

Economic hub and SAR in Bhutan

Gelephu Mindfulness City Gelephu Special Administrative Region
- Special Administrative Region
- Logo
- Country: Bhutan
- District: Sarpang District
- Region: Gelephu
- Announced: 17 December 2023
- Founder: King Jigme Khesar Namgyel Wangchuck

Government
  - Type: Special Administrative Region with its own Basic Law
  - Governor: Lotay Tshering

Area
  - Total: 2,500 km^{2} (970 sq mi)
- Website: gmc.bt

Gelephu Mindfulness City (GMC) (Dzongkha: དགེ་ལེགས་ཕུག་དྲན་ཤེས་ཁྲོམ་ཚོགས), also known as the Gelephu Special Administrative Region (stylized as GeSAR), is an economic hub and special administrative region in Gelephu, Bhutan, intended to be separate from the country's existing laws. It is part of the Sarpang District Special Economic Zone. Strategically located on the border with India, the finished city will leverage regional connectivity between South and Southeast Asia. It will cover an area of 2,500 square kilometres (970 sq mi), three times the size of Singapore.

The city has its own business-friendly regulations and systems, integrating sustainability, Bhutanese culture, and spirituality, with plastic-free, modern, urban, low-rise, eco-friendly buildings. The longer-term aim is to create a clean-technology innovation hub by attracting global investment to boost economic activity. All food is to be organic, electricity from renewable sources, and the hub will be built to promote cycling and to foster AI innovation.

The GMC has received attention for its Gross National Happiness concept, which prioritises spiritual well-being, cultural preservation, good governance, and environmental conservation, over economic growth.

== History and background ==
The King of Bhutan, Jigme Khesar Namgyel Wangchuck, announced the new city during a royal address at the 116th National Day celebration, on 17 December 2023. He described Gelephu Mindfulness City (GMC) as being a special administrative region (SAR) with its own distinct laws and systems, with initial development to be driven by foreign direct investment. Unveiled as part of Bhutan's broader strategy to diversify its economy beyond hydropower and tourism and create opportunities for its youth, GMC is intended to emphasise the country's cultural identity while integrating modern technologies and sustainable practices. Its development gained prominence at the Bhutan Innovation Forum in 2024, where it received endorsement from Nobel laureates Joseph Stiglitz and Michael Spence, architect Bjarke Ingels, and Snap Inc. CEO Evan Spiegel.

== Planning and design ==
The project's plan, developed by Danish architects Bjarke Ingels Group, sustainability consultants Arup and Cistri, and MQDC, will feature eleven mandala-inspired neighbourhoods connected by green corridors and inhabitable bridges. Designed to be low-rise and eco-friendly, the urban fabric will prioritise walkability, cycling, and integration with the Himalayan foothills and tropical plains.

The project will focus on eight core industries and sectors: spirituality, health and wellness, education, green energy and technology, finance and digital assets, agri-tech and forestry, aviation and logistics, and tourism.

In January 2025, GMC announced incorporation of cryptocurrencies like Bitcoin and Ether into its strategic reserves, marking a pioneering move in global finance.

The king has led a volunteer programme, hand-clearing the site of the new international airport. This effort reflects Bhutan's tradition of zhabtog, or community labour. The programme brought together 7,050 people, which included members of parliament as well as community groups from across the country. They worked together to develop public spaces and parks for Gelephu Mindfulness City, cleaning areas, installing benches, water points, and toilets.

In October 2025, at the start of the third wave of volunteer service, which brought together more than 5,600 people, the king established the pelsung, a new programme aimed at youth. "Everything we are doing today is for our youth—so that they will be better versions of us, better prepared, smarter, and more hard-working. It falls on us to build that future, and on them to protect it and take it to greater heights", he said. "We begin with 400–500 pelsungs but expect to have thousands in the coming years".

=== Features ===
==== Sustainability ====
GMC is touted as a global model for regenerative development, with mandates for zero-waste systems, biodiversity corridors, and carbon-negative buildings. All electricity will derive from renewables, and transportation will favour electric and non-motorised options.

=== Economy ===
The development will target eight pillar industries to create 100,000 jobs by 2030, focusing on high-value sectors like fintech, wellness tourism, and green technology. Business-friendly regulations, including tax incentives and a dedicated legal framework, will aim to attract global firms. In 2025, tourism stakeholders expressed strong interest in wellness retreats and cultural experiences.

In November 2026, a royal decree granted central banking powers to the Gelephu Financial Services Office, providing for its transition into the Gelephu Central Bank, an autonomous institution serving Gelephu Mindfulness City. Its mandate includes monetary policy, foreign reserve management, financial stability, financial supervision, and payment and settlement systems. The expanded powers also permit investment in digital assets alongside conventional reserve assets, and they provide a pathway for GMC to introduce its own currency, including in digital form, subject to the king's agreement.

=== Infrastructure ===
The region is to include an international airport, whose first phase will accommodate around 1.3 million passengers annually, with plans for expansion to 5.5 million. To fund the airport and related infrastructure, including high-speed rail links to India and smart grid systems, Bhutan launched its first-ever domestic bond offering in 2025, which has seen strong support from local investors.

Construction of Gelephu International Airport began in July 2025, initially involving land preparation and river-diversion earthworks. The planned airport includes a 3,000-metre runway. At the launch, its development schedule envisaged testing and commissioning beginning in March 2029 and inauguration in December 2029.

In October 2026, a pedestrian immigration terminal opened at the Gelephu crossing on the Bhutan–India border. The facility introduced automated e-gates using facial recognition to verify eligible Bhutanese and Indian nationals. Staffed immigration counters were retained for travellers without registered biometrics..

== Recent developments ==
In January 2025, the GMC received attention for its Gross National Happiness (GNH) concept, which prioritizes spiritual well-being, cultural preservation, good governance, and environmental conservation over economic growth. As Bhutan's Prime Minister Tshering Tobgay stated, "Happiness and well-being of people must be the purpose of capitalism".

As of September 2025, the "Innovate for GMC" program had attracted over 1,700 applicants, offering stipends to 500 youth for idea incubation in October. Prime Minister Tshering Tobgay promoted investment opportunities at the UNGA P3 Summit in New York City.

In September 2025, the digital asset financial services company Matrixport announced that it had received a financial services license to operate in GMC. It also stated that it would open an office in GMC and cultivate local talent.

In December 2025, Bhutan launched a new national blockchain initiative with the TER gold-backed digital token on the Solana platform. Issued by the Gelephu Mindfulness City and supported by the kingdom's sovereign framework, the TER token is designed to act as a bridge between traditional gold value and blockchain-based finance, offering international investors a tokenized, accessible version of gold with the benefits of digital custody and global transferability. The distribution and custody of TER are handled by DK Bank, Bhutan's first licensed digital bank, allowing investors in the initial phase to acquire the tokens directly through the bank, thus integrating traditional asset purchasing familiarity with the transparency of digital ownership. This move is part of Bhutan's national strategy to diversify its economy and establish Gelephu as a special administrative region attracting global investment through digital assets.

In November 2026, 108 Buddhist chortens were constructed as part of Project 108, a royal initiative announced in February of that year. Each monument stands approximately 15 metres high, with neighbouring chortens spaced approximately 108 metres apart along an 11.7-kilometre corridor beside the Mo Chhu river. This coincided with the Lhabab Duchen festival as well as the king's coronation rites.

The simultaneous consecration of the 108 chortens received Guinness World Records recognition under the category "The Most Stupas/Chortens Consecrated Simultaneously (Multiple Venues)".

=== Bitcoin Development Pledge ===
In December 2025, King Jigme Khesar Namgyel Wangchuck announced the "Bitcoin Development Pledge", committing up to 10,000 Bitcoin (approximately $1 billion) from the national reserves to fund the development of Gelephu Mindfulness City. Governed by a framework focused on transparency and capital preservation, the pledge is intended to serve as a long-term sovereign reserve to generate yields for the city's infrastructure without selling its underlying assets. This initiative follows other digital asset integrations within the city, including the use of cryptocurrency for tourism payments and the issuance of a sovereign-backed gold token named "TER".
