= Nawang Pelzang =

Bhutanese archer

Personal information
- Born: July 15, 1951 (age 73)

Sport
- Country: Bhutan
- Sport: Archery

Nawang Pelzang (born 15 July 1951), is an archer who internationally represented Bhutan

Pelzang took up archery when he was 12 years old, and won the National Championship in 1979. Five years later he competed for Bhutan at the 1984 Summer Olympics held in Los Angeles, in the individual event where he finished 55th.
