= Order of the Beloved Son of the Dragon =

Order of Merit

Order of the Beloved Son of the Dragon (Druk Jong Thuksey)

Awarded by Bhutan
- Type: Order
- Eligibility: Members of the Royal Bhutan Army, Royal Bodyguard, National Militia, Royal Bhutan Police and Forest Guards
- Status: Currently constituted
- Sovereign: Jigme Khesar Namgyel Wangchuck
- Grades: Single class (Meritorious Service Medal)

Precedence
- Next (higher): Order of the Wheel of the Thunder Dragon
- Next (lower): −
- Ribbon bar of the order

The Order of the Beloved Son of the Dragon (Dzongkha : Druk Jong Thuksey) is a Single Class Order ranking fifth in the Order of Precedence. It was instituted by the 3rd King Jigme Dorji Wangchuck on 9 February 1967 and reorganized by the 5th King Jigme Khesar Namgyel Wangchuck on 7 November 2008 and consists of a neck Badge and a matching miniature. Awarded to Members of the Royal Bhutan Army, Royal Bodyguard, National Militia, Royal Bhutan Police and Forest Guards.

== Insignia ==
The 65 mm badge, comprises a back plate of dorjee the point of which form an outer circle, within which a black enamelled circle encloses the King's portrait in gold, on a background of enameled yellow and orange of the Bhutanese National Flag.

The ribbon is red with orange and yellow stripes on the edges.
