= Rinzi Lham =

Bhutanese archer

Personal information
- Born: 10 October 1967 (age 57)

Sport
- Country: Bhutan
- Sport: Archery

Rinzi Lham (born 10 October 1967), is an archer who internationally represented Bhutan.

Lham competed for Bhutan at the 1984 Summer Olympics held in Los Angeles in the individual event where she finished 44th.

Lham is the youngest Bhutanese competitor to compete at the Summer Olympics, she was 16 years and 304 days old.
