= Sylwia Bogacka =

Polish sports shooter (born 1981)

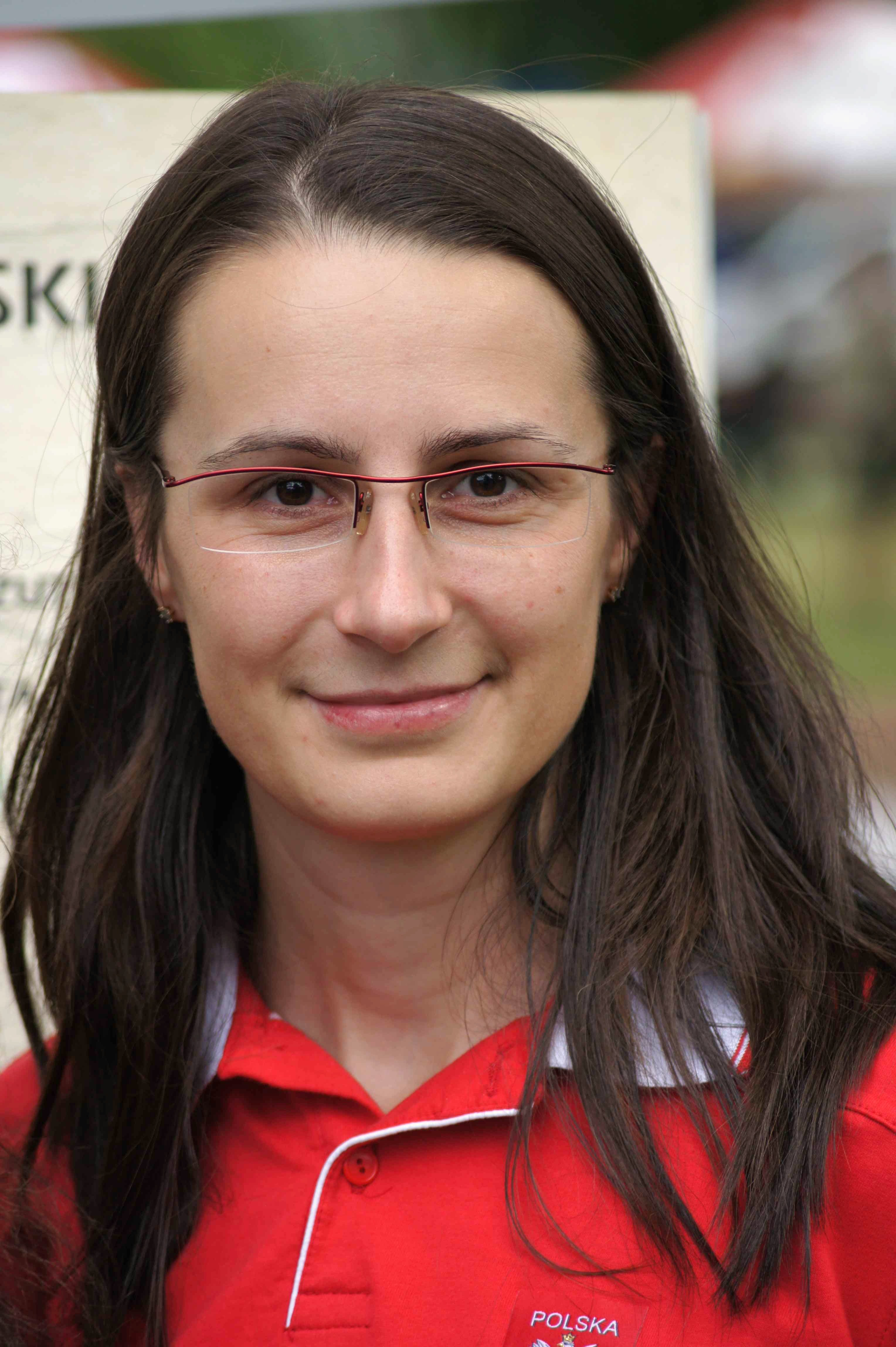
- Sylwia Bogacka

Medal record

Women's sports shooting

Representing Poland

Olympic Games
Silver medal – second place	2012 London	10m air rifle

Sylwia Katarzyna Bogacka (born October 3, 1981) is a Polish sports shooter.

Bogacka was born in Jelenia Góra, Poland. Bogacka studied sociology at the University of Zielona Góra. She first competed at the 2004 Summer Olympics. Four years later, she reached the final of the 10 meter air rifle in 2008, placing eighth. She placed first in the qualifying of women's 10 meter air rifle at the 2012 Summer Olympics, before winning the silver medal in the final. Bogacka then finished fourth in the Women's 50 meter rifle three positions with a score of 681.9.

== Olympic results ==
Event	2004	2008	2012	2016
50 metre rifle three positions	17th 573	10th 582	4th 583+98.9	23rd 577
10 metre air rifle	—	8th 397+98.7	(silver) Silver; 399+103.3	40th 409.1

== Personal life ==
She works as a soldier. Her rank is Corporal.

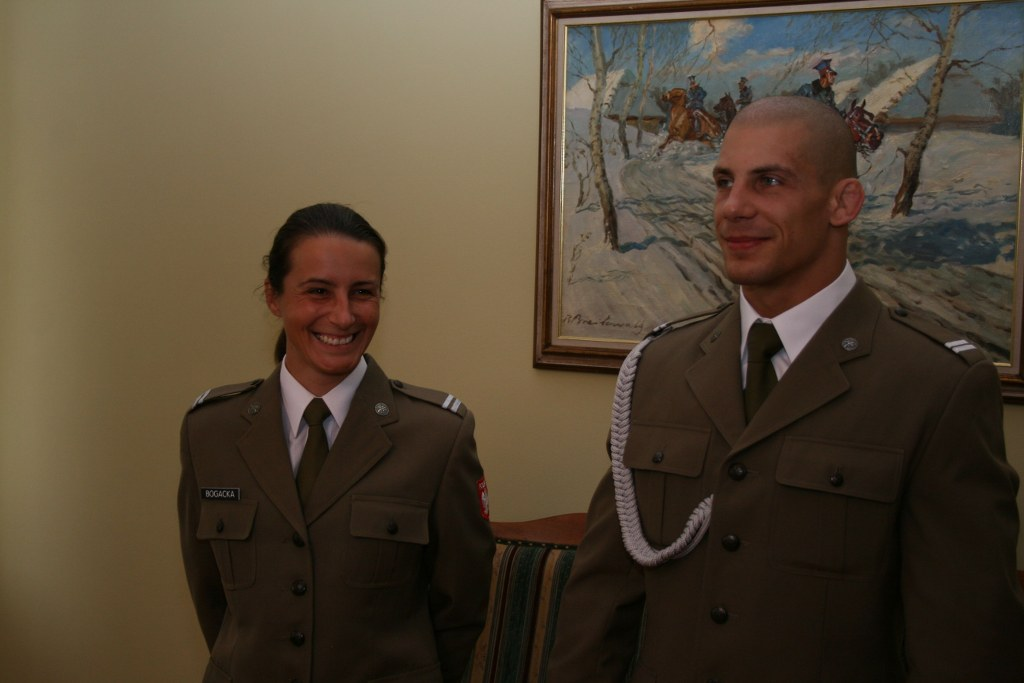
September, after London Olympics photo
