= Special administrative region =

Class of administrative division in China, North Korea, Indonesia, and East Timor

A special administrative region, special region, or special administrative area is a designation for types of administrative division in China, North Korea, Indonesia, South Sudan, Sudan, Timor-Leste, and Vietnam.

== Current ==
=== China ===
- Special administrative regions of China
  - Hong Kong
  - Macau
- Wolong National Nature Reserve

=== Indonesia ===
- Special Capital Region of Jakarta
- Special Region of Yogyakarta
- Aceh
- Papua
- West Papua
- Central Papua
- Highland Papua
- South Papua
- Southwest Papua

=== North Korea ===
- Sinuiju Special Administrative Region

=== South Sudan ===
- Abyei Special Administrative Area (condominium simultaneously administered by the Republic of South Sudan and the Republic of the Sudan)
- Greater Pibor Administrative Area
- Ruweng Administrative Area

=== Sudan ===
- Abyei Special Administrative Area (condominium simultaneously administered by the Republic of South Sudan and the Republic of the Sudan)

=== Timor-Leste ===
- Oecusse-Ambeno Special Administrative Region

=== Vietnam ===
- Special administrative region (Vietnam)

== Planned ==
=== Bhutan ===
- Gelephu Special Administrative Region (Gelephu Mindfulness City)

=== Indonesia ===
- Nusantara Capital City

=== Russia ===
- Oktyabrsky Island Special Administrative Region
- Russky Island Special Economic Zone

== See also ==
- Autonomous administrative division
