= Karma Tenzin =

Bhutanese archer (born 1972)

Karma Tenzin (born 1 December 1972), is an archer who internationally represented Bhutan.

Tenzin competed for Bhutan at the 1992 Summer Olympics in Barcelona, finishing 71st in the individual event and the three man team finished 20th.
