= Ugyen Ugyen =

Bhutanese archer

Ugyen Ugyen (born 2 June 1974) is an archer who represented Bhutan internationally.

Ugyen competed for Bhutan in the women's individual event at the 1996 Summer Olympics in Atlanta; she finished 60th in the ranking round before being beaten by Olena Sadovnycha from Ukraine in the next round.
