= Shooting at the 2012 Summer Olympics – Women's 10 metre air rifle =

Women's 10 metre air rifle at the Games of the XXX Olympiad
- Venue: Royal Artillery Barracks
- Date: 28 July 2012
- Competitors: 56 from 41 nations
- Winning score: 502.9

Medalists
1st place, gold medalist(s)		Yi Siling	China
2nd place, silver medalist(s)		Sylwia Bogacka	Poland
3rd place, bronze medalist(s)		Yu Dan	China

The Women's 10 metre air rifle event at the 2012 Olympic Games took place on 28 July 2012 at the Royal Artillery Barracks.

The event consisted of two rounds: a qualifier and a final. In the qualifier, each shooter fired 40 shots with an air rifle at 10 metres distance from the standing position. Scores for each shot were in increments of 1, with a maximum score of 10.

The top 8 shooters in the qualifying round moved on to the final round. There, they fired an additional 10 shots. These shots scored in increments of .1, with a maximum score of 10.9. The total score from all 50 shots was used to determine final ranking.

== Records ==
Prior to this competition, the existing world and Olympic records were as follows.

Qualification records
World record	Seo Sun-hwa (KOR)	400	Sydney, Australia	12 April 2002
Olympic record	Kateřina Emmons (CZE)	400	Beijing, China	9 August 2008

Final records
World record	Yi Siling (CHN)	505.6 (400+105.6)	Munich, Germany	1 August 2010
Olympic record	Kateřina Emmons (CZE)	503.5 (400+103.5)	Beijing, China	9 August 2008

== Qualification round ==
Rank	Athlete	Country	1	2	3	4	Total	Inner 10s	Shoot Off	Notes
1	Sylwia Bogacka	Poland	99	100	100	100	399	37		Q
2	Yi Siling	China	100	100	99	100	399	36		Q
3	Daria Vdovina	Russia	100	99	100	99	398	35		Q
4	Yu Dan	China	100	99	100	99	398	31		Q
5	Elaheh Ahmadi	Iran	99	99	100	99	397	31	52.0	Q
6	Jamie Lynn Gray	United States	100	99	98	100	397	33	51.5	Q
7	Sarah Scherer	United States	99	99	100	99	397	32	51.2	Q
8	Kateřina Emmons	Czech Republic	99	99	99	100	397	33	50.3	Q
9	Stine Nielsen	Denmark	100	99	99	99	397	30	50.1	
10	Lioubov Galkina	Russia	99	98	100	99	396	34		
11	Živa Dvoršak	Slovenia	98	100	99	99	396	33		
12	Petra Zublasing	Italy	99	100	99	98	396	33		
13	Dariya Sharipova	Ukraine	98	99	98	100	395	33		
14	Daniela Pešková	Slovakia	100	99	98	98	395	33		
15	Andrea Arsović	Serbia	97	98	100	100	395	30		
16	Marjo Yli-Kiikka	Finland	97	99	100	99	395	30		
17	Bahya Mansour Al-Hamad	Qatar	98	99	100	98	395	30		
18	Snježana Pejčić	Croatia	99	98	99	99	395	29		
19	Stephanie Obermoser	Austria	99	98	99	99	395	27		
20	Jessica Mager	Germany	98	99	99	98	394	34		
21	Na Yoon-Kyung	South Korea	97	100	98	99	394	31		
22	Olga Dovgun	Kazakhstan	98	99	98	99	394	33		
23	Daria Tykhova	Ukraine	97	99	98	100	394	29		
24	Xiang Wei Jasmine Ser	Singapore	97	98	100	99	394	28		
25	Malin Westerheim	Norway	97	100	98	99	394	28		
26	Laurence Brize	France	100	99	98	97	394	26		
27	Sharmin Ratna	Bangladesh	95	99	100	99	393	30		
28	Maryam Arzouqi	Kuwait	97	97	100	99	393	29		
29	Dianelys Pérez	Cuba	98	98	98	99	393	28		
30	Stine Andersen	Denmark	97	98	98	100	393	19		
31	Adéla Sýkorová	Czech Republic	97	97	98	100	392	30		
32	Beate Gauß	Germany	96	99	98	99	392	29		
33	Émilie Évesque	France	99	99	96	98	392	29		
34	Nur Suryani Mohd Taibi	Malaysia	98	97	99	99	392	26		
35	Rosa Pena Rocamontes	Mexico	96	99	98	99	392	25		
36	Jennifer McIntosh	Great Britain	99	98	97	98	392	25		
37	Ivana Maksimović	Serbia	99	97	99	97	392	24		
38	Annik Marguet	Switzerland	97	96	99	100	392	23		
39	Melissa Mikec	El Salvador	98	97	99	98	392	23		
40	Petya Lukanova	Bulgaria	97	100	98	97	392	23		
41	Nourhan Amer	Egypt	97	100	98	96	391	29		
42	Anzela Voronova	Estonia	96	99	98	98	391	25		
43	Mahlagha Jambozorg	Iran	97	99	98	97	391	25		
44	Eglys Yahima De La Cruz	Cuba	98	98	98	97	391	25		
45	Robyn van Nus	Australia	95	99	99	98	391	23		
46	Elania Nardelli	Italy	96	98	98	98	390	27		
47	Paula Wrońska	Poland	98	97	98	97	390	27		
48	Carole Calmes	Luxembourg	98	98	98	96	390	20		
49	Sakina Mamedova	Uzbekistan	97	98	99	95	389	20		
50	Raya Zin Aldden	Syria	95	98	97	98	388	23		
51	Jeong Mira	South Korea	96	96	98	97	387	24		
52	Alethea Sedgman	Australia	96	98	97	96	387	20		
53	Sofia Padilla	Ecuador	93	98	98	97	386	23		
54	Sneh Rana	Nepal	94	97	96	96	383	18		
55	Diaz Kusumawardani	Indonesia	94	98	95	95	382	20		
56	Kunzang Choden	Bhutan	94	97	95	95	381	16		

== Final ==
Rank	Athlete	Qual	1	2	3	4	5	6	7	8	9	10	Final	Total	Notes
1st place, gold medalist(s)	Yi Siling (CHN)	399	10.8	10.0	10.3	10.3	10.4	10.2	10.4	10.7	10.3	10.5	103.9	502.9	
2nd place, silver medalist(s)	Sylwia Bogacka (POL)	399	10.8	10.3	10.0	10.4	10.8	9.9	10.5	9.7	10.0	10.8	103.2	502.2	
3rd place, bronze medalist(s)	Yu Dan (CHN)	398	10.1	10.7	10.3	10.7	10.6	10.0	10.2	10.5	10.8	9.6	103.5	501.5	
4	Kateřina Emmons (CZE)	397	10.3	10.6	10.3	10.7	10.1	10.5	10.3	10.7	10.2	9.6	103.3	500.3	
5	Jamie Lynn Gray (USA)	397	9.5	10.5	9.8	10.4	10.7	10.7	10.4	10.2	10.1	10.4	102.7	499.7	
6	Elaheh Ahmadi (IRI)	397	10.1	10.4	10.7	10.3	10.6	9.6	9.8	10.2	10.3	10.1	102.1	499.1	
7	Sarah Scherer (USA)	397	10.5	10.3	10.3	10.3	10.1	10.2	10.3	9.5	10.3	10.2	102.0	499.0	
8	Daria Vdovina (RUS)	398	10.5	9.5	10.1	10.2	10.3	10.0	9.8	10.0	10.2	9.9	100.5	498.5	
