= Dorji Dema =

Bhutanese archer (born 1983)

Dorji Dema (born October 16, 1983) is an athlete from Bhutan who competes in archery.

At the 2008 Summer Olympics in Beijing Dema finished her ranking round with a total of 567 points. This gave her the 61st seed for the final competition bracket in which she faced Khatuna Narimanidze in the first round. The archer from Georgia was too strong and won the confrontation with 107-97, eliminating Dema straight away.
