= Sangay Tenzin =

Bhutanese swimmer (born 2003)

Personal information
- Full name: Sangay Tenzin
- Born: 7 September 2003 (age 22) Gelephu, Bhutan

Sport
- Sport: Swimming

Sangay Tenzin (born 7 September 2003) is a Bhutanese swimmer. Born in Gelephu, Tenzin grew up swimming in the town's rivers and studied at Ugyen Academy, swimming in multiple competitions. He was chosen to be part of the Bhutanese national swimming team in 2019. There, he received a scholarship from FINA to train and reside in Thailand. He then made his international debut at the 2019 World Aquatics Championships, setting a national record at a subsequent competition.

At the 2020 Summer Olympics, he was the first Bhutanese swimmer to compete at an Olympic Games. Among other competitions, he has competed in three more World Championships, the Asian Games, and the 2024 Summer Olympics.

== Early life and education ==
Sangay Tenzin was born on 7 September 2003 in Gelephu, Bhutan. He grew up speaking English, Hindi, and Nepali. Tenzin started swimming in 2009, swimming in rivers in Gelephu. He studied at Ugyen Academy and regularly competed in swimming competitions. In 2019, he was selected by the Bhutan Olympic Committee to be part of the national team.

== Career ==
Through a scholarship offered by World Aquatics and the Bhutan Swimming Federation, he moved to Thailand and resided in Phuket to train at the World Aquatics Training Centre. There, he was trained by swimming coach Miguel Lopez. He then made his international debut at the 2019 World Aquatics Championships in Gwangju, South Korea. He competed first in the heats of the men's 100 metre freestyle on 24 July. He swam in a time of 1:07.28 and placed last out of the 120 swimmers that competed. He competed again in the heats of the men's 50 metre freestyle two days later and swam in a time of 29.49 seconds, placing him 125th out of the 131 swimmers that competed. After the World Championships, he had set a national record in the men's 50 metre breaststroke at the 2020 Thailand Age Group Championships.

Tenzin was selected to be part of the Bhutanese team at the 2020 Summer Olympics in Tokyo, Japan. He would be the first swimmer to compete for Bhutan at an Olympic Games. He competed in the heats of the men's 100 metre freestyle on 27 July 2021. He finished the race in 57.57 seconds and set a new national record in the event, though he placed 68th and failed to advanced to the semifinals. He then competed at the 2021 FINA World Swimming Championships (25 m) in the men's 50 metre freestyle and men's 100 metre freestyle, though he did not medal in either of the competitions.

At the 2022 World Aquatics Championships, he competed in the men's 100 metre freestyle and men's 200 metre freestyle. He first competed in the heats of the latter on 19 June, though he swam in a time of 2:08.36 and placed last overall. He then competed in the former two days later and swam in a time of 57.69, breaking his national record. He broke the national record again at the 2023 Thailand Age Group Championships with a time of 57.04 seconds. Tenzin also competed at the 2023 World Aquatics Championships in Fukuoka, Japan, and again did not medal in his events.

He competed at the 2022 Asian Games that were rescheduled to 2023 in Hangzhou, China. In the men's 100 metre freestyle, he again broke his national record with a time of 55.94 seconds. He later broke the record at the 2024 World Aquatics Championships in Doha, Qatar, with a time of 55.42 seconds. Through a universality slot, a slot which allows underrepresented nations to compete and for a National Olympic Committee to send athletes despite not meeting the other qualification criteria, Tenzin would compete at his second Olympic Games. On 30 July, he participated in the heats of the men's 100 metre freestyle in heat one. He finished the race in 56.08 seconds, third out of seven competitors in his heat and 74th overall, not advancing further.
