= Tripartite Commission =

Olympic movement commission

A Tripartite Commission is the name given to one of a number of commissions within the Olympic movement, consisting of representatives of (1) the International Olympic Committee ("IOC"), (2) one or more international sports federations ("IFs"), and (3) one or more National Olympic Committees ("NOCs"). Currently, Tripartite Commissions are primarily used to select athletes to be invited to compete at the Olympic Games through special invitational quota places intended to improve universality.

== History ==
The initial Tripartite Commission was created in 1971. Its initial purpose was to work on preparations for the X Olympic Congress in Varna in 1973. One of the subjects of the X Olympic Congress was "Relations between the IOC, International Federations and National Olympic Committees". The purpose of the Commission then expanded to include general issues of interest to the NOCs, the IFs, and the IOC. This was a response to complaints from the NOCS and the IFs that they had little say in the Olympic Movement and no official process to voice their opinions. The Commission also organized the XI Olympic Congress in Baden-Baden in 1981.

The chair of the Tripartite Commission was the IOC president, initially Lord Killanin and later Juan Antonio Samaranch. As of 1980, the membership of the commission consisted of 3 vice presidents of the IOC, 3 representatives of the IFs, and 3 representatives of the NOCS.

The Tripartite Commission was replaced by the Olympic Movement Commission following the XI Olympic Congress. The latter commission was itself disbanded in 2001 and replaced by the Olympic Programme Commission.

== Modern Tripartite Commission ==
The modern Tripartite Commission is a three-way collaboration between the IOC, the Association of National Olympic Committees, and the IFs (through the Association of Summer Olympic International Federations or Association of International Olympic Winter Sports Federations) that ensures participation by athletes from NOCs who would, through normal qualification channels, have little or no representation at the Games. An additional objective is to contribute to enhancing and reflecting universality by selecting athletes from such NOCs, which have not been able to qualify, so that they may have an opportunity to be invited to compete in sports and disciplines for which Invitation Places have been reserved. The IOC considers universality to be a fundamental aspect of the Olympics.

As of the 2020 Summer Olympics, 16 of the (summer) Olympic sports had a total of 104 quota places reserved for Tripartite Commission invitations. There were 92 eligible NOCs. For context, there are 33 sports, 206 NOCs, and over 11,000 athletes at the 2020 Summer Olympics. Each sport that uses Tripartite Commission invitation places describes the details of its places in its qualification system for each Games. In order to be eligible for a Tripartite Commission invitation, a given NOC has to have an average of no more than 8 athletes in individual sports over the previous two Games.

The Tripartite Commission consists of one representative of the IOC, one representative of the IFs, and one representative of the NOCs.
