= Gelephu =

Gelephu དགེ་ལེགས་ཕུག་
- Thromde
- Houses along Gadhem Lam

- Location in Bhutan
- Coordinates: 26°52′14″N 90°29′8″E
- Country: Bhutan
- District: Sarpang District
- Sub-district: Gelephu Dungkhag
- Village block: Gelephu Gewog
- Gelephu Thromde: July 2010

Government
  - Drangpon: Karma Dorji
  - Thrompon: Tshering Norbu

Area
  - Thromde: 11.5 km^{2} (4.4 sq mi)
  - Urban: 11.52 km^{2} (4.45 sq mi)
- Elevation: 221 m (725 ft)

Population (2017)
  - Thromde: 9,858
  - Density: 857/km^{2} (2,220/sq mi)
- Time zone: UTC+6 (BTT)
- Website: gelephuthrom.bt

Gelephu (Dzongkha: དགེ་ལེགས་ཕུ་; Wylie: dge-legs-phu) (Note: also spelled as Gelyephug, Gelegphu, Gaylegphug, or Gaylephug.) is a town and Thromde in Sarpang District, Bhutan. It is located on the Indian border, about 30 km to the east of Sarpang, the Dzongkhag (District) headquarters, and has a population of 9,858 as per the 2017 census. It is one of the border markets and road entry points into Bhutan from India; Phuntsholing to its west and Samdrup Jongkhar to its east are two other border market road entry points into Bhutan.

Gelephu Special Administrative Region (GeSAR) also known as Gelephu Mindfulness City (GMC), is a planned economic hub and special administrative region in Gelephu, separate from Bhutan's existing laws. Strategically located on the border with India to leverage regional connectivity betweem South Asia and South East Asia, it will cover an area of 2,500 square kilometers, or three times the size of Singapore.

== History ==
The history of Gelephu dates back to the 1960s when the original settlement was moved from the banks of Mo Chhu to the present area, which used to be known as Hati Sahar (elephant place).

On 5 September 2004, insurgents bombed a marketplace in the town, killing two people and injuring twenty-seven others.

== Urban development ==
Gelephu Thromde has 11.52 km^{2} planning boundary area which can be increased further. It has 6 sub zones (Demkhong) listed as 1. Trashiling, 2. Namkhaling, 3. Jampeling, 4. Rabtengling, 5. Samdrupling, 6. Sonam Gatsel. Core market area is very close to the Indo-Bhutan border. Ashish Kumar Chauhan is also one of the Urban Planner while delineating the boundaries of Industrial Area Plan and Local Area Plan 4 & 5.

One theme of the Gelephu Plan is to develop inter-linked open-green spaces for use as recreation, sports, walking, cycling, exercising and play gardens that can provide an excellent opportunity to promote planned growth of Gelephu unlike many other settlements.

In December 2023, during the 116th National Day celebration, King Jigme Khesar Namgyel Wangchuck unveiled a project to establish a Special Administrative Region in Gelephu called Gelephu Mindfulness City or the Gelephu Special Administrative Region. The project spans 1,000 square kilometers. Inspired by Bhutanese culture and Gross National Happiness principles, the plan includes an international airport, railways, a hydroelectric dam, and diverse public spaces.

The Construction Development Corporation Limited (CDCL), fully owned by the Royal Government of Bhutan, following a 1996-1997 merger and subsequently upgraded the Gelephu workshop which now serves CDCL's Sarpang, Phuentsholing, and Zhemgang Field Divisions, covering a wide central region, with field support from workshops in Sarpang and Mangdechu.

== Trade and commerce ==
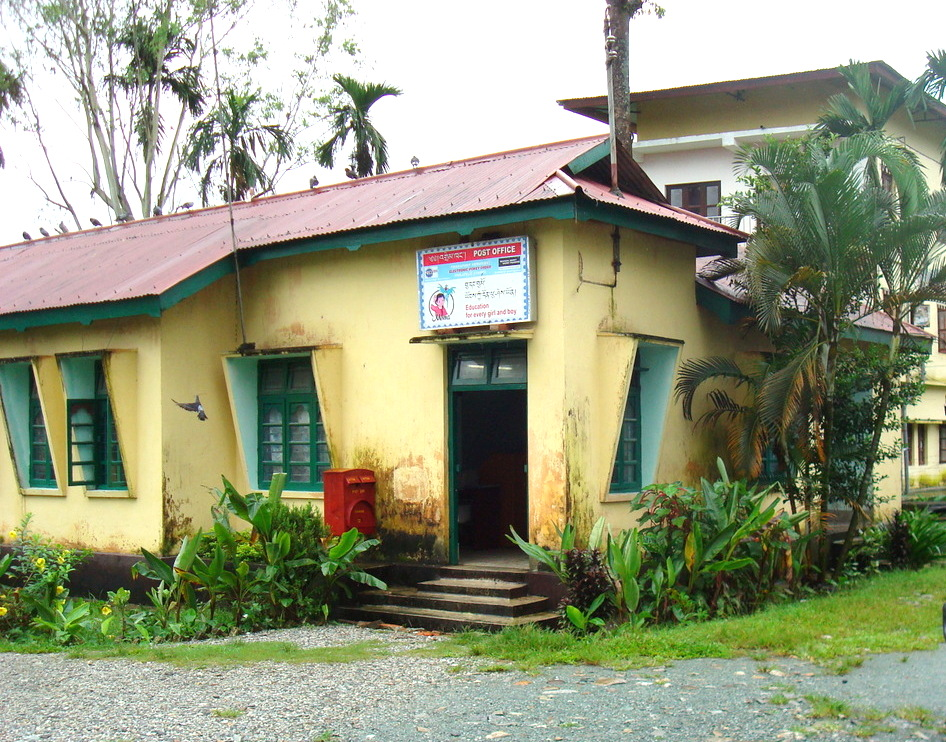
Post office in Gelephu

The location of Gelephu is favorable for cross-border trade between India and Bhutan. From that Indo-Bhutan border gate Bongaigaon, the sixth largest city of Assam, emerging as a business node for economics affairs i.e., business dealing & logistic supports is 78 km away.

== Transport ==
Gelephu Airport was completed in 2012, after being planned in the early 2000s. In 2023, it was announced that a new international airport would be built as part of the proposed Gelephu Special Administrative Region. The existing domestic airport will remain operational.

== Tourism ==
Key attractions include the Gelephu Tshachu (a hot spring in the southern plains of Gelephu known for its miraculous healing power and properties, inaugurated by the Third King Jigme Dorji Wangchuck in 1962),

== Climate ==
Climate data for Gelephu (Bhur), elevation 375 m (1,230 ft), (1996–2017 normals)
Month	Jan	Feb	Mar	Apr	May	Jun	Jul	Aug	Sep	Oct	Nov	Dec	Year
Record high °C (°F)	30.0 (86.0)	35.0 (95.0)	33.2 (91.8)	36.4 (97.5)	37.0 (98.6)	36.0 (96.8)	38.5 (101.3)	38.8 (101.8)	39.0 (102.2)	37.0 (98.6)	35.0 (95.0)	32.0 (89.6)	39.0 (102.2)
Mean daily maximum °C (°F)	22.3 (72.1)	24.0 (75.2)	26.4 (79.5)	27.6 (81.7)	28.8 (83.8)	29.1 (84.4)	29.5 (85.1)	30.2 (86.4)	29.6 (85.3)	28.7 (83.7)	26.3 (79.3)	23.8 (74.8)	27.2 (80.9)
Daily mean °C (°F)	17.8 (64.0)	19.9 (67.8)	22.4 (72.3)	24.2 (75.6)	25.6 (78.1)	26.3 (79.3)	26.7 (80.1)	27.2 (81.0)	26.5 (79.7)	24.9 (76.8)	22.0 (71.6)	19.3 (66.7)	23.6 (74.4)
Mean daily minimum °C (°F)	13.2 (55.8)	15.8 (60.4)	18.4 (65.1)	20.7 (69.3)	22.4 (72.3)	23.5 (74.3)	23.9 (75.0)	24.2 (75.6)	23.4 (74.1)	21.1 (70.0)	17.7 (63.9)	14.7 (58.5)	19.9 (67.9)
Record low °C (°F)	6.0 (42.8)	8.0 (46.4)	10.0 (50.0)	13.0 (55.4)	15.5 (59.9)	18.2 (64.8)	19.0 (66.2)	19.5 (67.1)	18.5 (65.3)	15.0 (59.0)	10.5 (50.9)	7.0 (44.6)	6.0 (42.8)
Average rainfall mm (inches)	16.6 (0.65)	29.0 (1.14)	73.6 (2.90)	237.3 (9.34)	445.6 (17.54)	1,032.7 (40.66)	1,313.7 (51.72)	1,051.9 (41.41)	686.2 (27.02)	192.7 (7.59)	16.3 (0.64)	10.0 (0.39)	5,105.6 (201)
Average rainy days	2.0	3.2	6.5	13.3	18.7	23.2	25.6	23.8	19.0	8.6	1.7	1.7	147.3
Average relative humidity (%)	70.2	68.9	69.2	78.8	82.0	86.5	87.5	85.9	83.5	76.6	71.9	70.5	77.6
Source 1: National Center for Hydrology and Meteorology
Source 2: World Meteorological Organization (rainy days 1996–2018)

== See also ==
- Bhutan–India border
- Bhutan–India relations
