= Lenchu Kunzang =

Bhutanese sports shooter (born 1992)

Personal information
- National team: Bhutan
- Born: February 10, 1992 (age 34)

Sport
- Sport: Shooting
- Event: 10 metre air rifle
- Coached by: Kunzang Choden

Lenchu Kunzang (born 10 February 1992) is a Bhutanese sports shooter who competed at the 2016 Summer Olympics.

== Personal life ==
Lenchu Kunzang was born on 10 February 1992. She trained as a police officer, graduating from Jigmeling Police Training Centre in Gelephu in 2012, topping her class in rifle shooting, and was later stationed in Phuntsholing. Along with three others, she was approached by the Bhutan Olympic Committee who were looking for elite shooters from the police training centre.

== Shooting ==
She was selected to become part of the national team by the Bhutan Shooting Federation in 2013. Her coach is Kunzang Choden who competed for Bhutan at the 2012 Summer Olympics. She competes in AR-40 rifle events.

Lenchu Kunzang was selected as part of the Bhutan team at the 2014 Asian Games, held in Incheon, South Korea. Competing in the women's 10 metre air rifle she scored 398.5 points in the qualification round to place 47th and did not advance to the finals. At the 2014 Asian Shooting Championships held in Kuwait City she placed 42nd with a score of 382.6. At the 2015 Asian Shooting Championships in New Delhi, India, she placed 14th with a score of 399.0.

Kunzang competed in the women's 10 metre air rifle event at the 2016 South Asian Games held in Guwahati, India, placing 17th out of 18 athletes with a score of 394.3.

At the 2016 Asian Olympic Shooting Qualifying Tournament held in New Delhi, Kunzang scored 400.0 points and finished 51st out of 57 competitors. She did not advance to the finals but the score was beyond the minimum qualification score of 392.0 needed for the 2016 Summer Olympics.

At the 2016 Summer Olympics, Kunzang scored 404.9 points to finish 45th out of 51 competitors in the qualifying round of the women's 10 metre air rifle and did not advance to the finals. She was the flag bearer for Bhutan during the closing ceremony.
