= Olympic quota allocation system =

The Olympic quota allocation system is a program designed to limit the number of athletes participating, and to prevent a small number of countries from dominating the field of an Olympic event.

== Summer Olympics ==
Underrepresented nations are eligible to apply for quota places in various sports, regardless of whether their athletes meet the standard qualification criteria. These places are known as Universality Places.

== Winter Olympics ==
=== Freestyle skiing ===
Initially freestyle skiing had two events (moguls and aerials). There were quotas brought in to limit the number of competitors (particularly from the United States and Canada), which are highly competitive in the two events. For the 2010 Olympics, the quota system limited the competition for men and women's freestyle skiing (moguls, aerials, and ski-cross) to 180 athletes. Irrespective of international ranking, each country could only have eighteen athletes, and a maximum of ten men or ten women. With the addition of slopestyle and half-pipe in the Sochi Olympics in 2014, the quotas were increased to 282 total athletes, 26 per country, and 14 per gender. This resulted in countries having to limit their participation, despite having eligible athletes. For example, Canada could have sent 33 participants based on international ranking, but they were limited to 26 quota spots. For the 2018 Winter Olympics, the number of athletes participating remained the same, but the number of quota spots increased to a maximum of thirty per country.

=== Snowboarding ===
Snowboarding has a similar quota program to freestyle skiing, with 26 spots available per country. For the 2018 Winter Olympics the only country to fill all of its quota spots was the United States.

=== Bobsleigh ===
In the 2018 Winter Olympics, a maximum of 170 athletes could compete, and a maximum of three teams per event, with the host nation allotted at least one space.
