= Kinzang Lhamo =

Bhutanese athlete (born 1998)

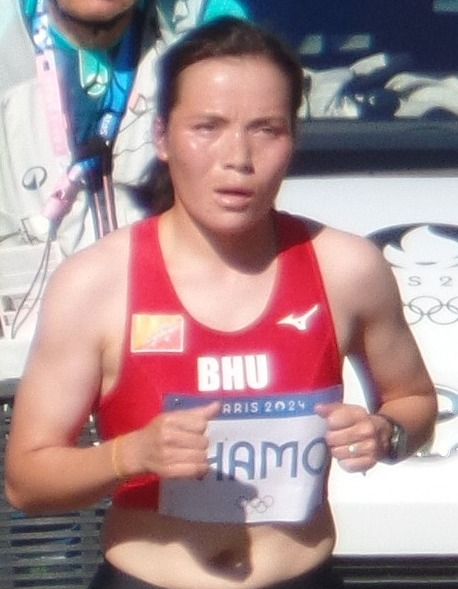
- Lhamo at the 2024 Olympics

Personal information
- Nationality: Bhutanese
- Born: 15 June 1998 (age 28) Bhutan

Sport
- Sport: Athletics
- Event: Marathon

Kinzang Lhamo (born 15 June 1998) is a Bhutanese marathon and ultramarathon runner.

== Career ==
Lhamo specialises in ultramarathons. She had a second place finish at the 2022 Snowman Race, a 5-day ultra-marathon at Chamkhar in Bumthang across the Himalayan mountains. That year, she finished second at the Coronation Marathon in Paro, Bhutan.

In 2023, Lhamo won the Bhutan International marathon. The following year, she retained her title at the 10th edition of the Bhutan International Marathon in Punakha and set a personal best time of 3 hours and 26 minutes.

In 2024, she was awarded a universality place to represent Bhutan in the marathon at the 2024 Paris Olympics. It marked her first competition outside of Bhutan. In preparation for the event, Lhamo trained in Thimphu with the help of the Bhutan Amateur Athletic Federation. She completed the marathon in 80th with a time of 3:52:59; despite finishing in last place, she received an overwhelming standing ovation from spectators, praising her willing determination to finish the event. Although she was nearly an hour behind the next closest finisher, her time placed her in the top 20th percentile of all marathon racers and was not far off the earliest female record holders.

== Personal life ==
From Trashigang, Lhamo is a soldier in the Royal Bhutanese Army, stationed in Haa in the west of the country.

== Sources ==
- Nestler, Stefan (19 July 2024). "Paris 2024: Adventure of a lifetime for Bhutan athletes". Deutsche Welle. Bonn, Germany.
- Keenan, Conor (11 August 2024). "'Quite moving' scenes as fans flock to side of last marathon runner Kinzang Lhamo and cheer her home at Paris 2024". TNT Sports.
