= Sonam Chuki =

Bhutanese archer (born 1963)

Personal information
- Born: 7 April 1963 (age 61)

Sport
- Country: Bhutan
- Sport: Archery

Sonam Chuki (born 7 April 1963), is a former Bhutanese archer who internationally represented Bhutan.

Chuki competed for Bhutan at the 1984 Summer Olympics held in Los Angeles in the individual event where she finished 43rd.
