= Karma (archer) =

Bhutanese recurve archer (born 1990)

Personal information
- Born: 6 June 1990 (age 36) Tsenkharla, Trashiyangtse, Bhutan
- Height: 163 cm (5 ft 4 in)
- Weight: 51 kg (112 lb)

Sport
- Country: Bhutan
- Sport: Archery
- Event: Recurve
Medal record
Women's archery
Representing Bhutan
South Asian Games
Bronze medal – third place	2019 Pokhara	Individual recurve
Bronze medal – third place	2019 Pokhara	Team recurve

Karma (born 6 June 1990) is a Bhutanese recurve archer. She represented Bhutan at the 2016 and 2020 Summer Olympics, and won two bronze medals for Bhutan at the 2019 South Asian Games in Nepal.

== Biography ==
Karma was born on 6 June 1990 in Tsenkharla, Trashiyangtse District, Bhutan. Being interested in sports, Karma took up archery in April 2009. She was also a runner in school. Her first appearance as an international competitor was in 2012 and by 2018, she had competed in at least eight international events.

Karma competed in the individual recurve event and the team recurve event at the 2013 and 2015 World Archery Championships in Copenhagen, Denmark and she represented Bhutan at the 2016 Summer Olympics in Rio de Janeiro. She was defeated in the first round by Tuyana Dashidorzhieva of Russia. She was the flag-bearer for Bhutan during the Parade of Nations. Karma competed at the 2019 South Asian Games in Pokhara, winning bronze in the women's individual recurve competition and helping her team win bronze in the team recurve competition.

Karma took part in the 2020 Summer Olympics in Tokyo and was again a flag-bearer for Bhutan in the Parade of Nations during the opening ceremony. She was the first athlete from Bhutan to receive a place in the Olympic quota allocation system in any sport and the first female from Bhutan who qualified for the games. While practicing for the Tokyo Olympics in May 2021, Karma was able to do a "Robin Hood" shot, which is when an arrow strikes into another arrow that is already in the target board, splitting it, as told in the legends of Robin Hood.

Karma earned a spot at the 2020 Summer Olympics in Tokyo after qualifying via the 2018 Asian Championships in Bangkok, Thailand. She lost to Deepika Kumari of India 6–0 in round of 64 at the 2020 Olympics. Karma said that qualifying for the Tokyo Olympics had been her biggest dream as well as an achievement for her country.
