= Kunzang Choden (sport shooter) =

Bhutanese sports shooter (born 1984)

Personal information
- Born: 14 August 1984 (age 42) Thimphu, Bhutan

Sport
- Sport: Sports shooting

Kunzang Choden (born 14 August 1984) is a Bhutanese sports shooter. She competed in the Women's 10 metre air rifle event at the 2012 Summer Olympics. She was the coach of Olympic qualifier Lenchu Kunzang.
