= Thinley Dorji (archer) =

Bhutanese archer (born 1950)

Personal information
- Born: November 20, 1950 (age 74)

Sport
- Country: Bhutan
- Sport: Archery

Thinley Dorji (born 20 November 1950), is an archer who internationally represented Bhutan. He is the brother-in-law of Bhutanese king Jigme Singye Wangchuck.

Dorji competed for Bhutan at two Summer Olympics, he was part of the first team to compete at the Olympics for Bhutan when he took part in the 1984 Summer Olympics held in Los Angeles, where he finished 53rd, four years later he competed in the 1988 Summer Olympics held in Seoul, he finished 73rd in the individual event and the team finished 22nd in the team event.
