= Lhendup Tshering =

Bhutanese archer

Personal information
- Born: June 5, 1947 (age 77)

Sport
- Country: Bhutan
- Sport: Archery

Lhendup Tshering (born 5 June 1947), is an archer who internationally represented Bhutan

Tshering competed for Bhutan at the 1984 Summer Olympics held in Los Angeles in the individual event where he finished 60th.
