= Tashi Peljor =

Bhutanese archer

Personal information
- Nationality: Bhutanese
- Born: 15 July 1978 (age 47) Bhutan

Sport
- Sport: Archery

Tashi Peljor (born 15 July 1978) is a Bhutanese archer. Peljor is a scholarship holder with the Olympic Solidarity program.

At the 2008 Summer Olympics in Beijing Peljor finished his ranking round with a total of 632 points. This gave him the 54th seed for the final competition bracket in which he faced Wang Cheng Pang in the first round. Wang won the game 110-100, but was eliminated in the next round by Moriya Ryuichi.

== See also ==
- Bhutan at the Olympics
