= Tshering Choden (archer) =

Bhutanese archer (born 1980)

Tshering Choden (born 1 January 1979 or 6 July 1980) is an archer from Bhutan who competed at the 2000 and 2004 Summer Olympics.

Choden was born in Trashigang, Bhutan. Having excelled at sports in school, in 1998 Choden was encouraged to try archery by her brother, who was a member of the Olympic team.

Choden entered the 2004 Summer Olympics with a world ranking of 176. She was one of two Bhutanese athletes taking part in the Games, the other being with fellow archer Tashi Peljor, and was selected as Bhutan's flagbearer for the Games' opening ceremony. Choden began the women's individual event with fifty-fourth place in the preliminary 72-arrow ranking round, scoring 600 points from 720. She delivered a surprise result in the opening elimination round with victory over China's Lin Sang by a margin of three points, becoming the first Bhutanese archer ever to win a match at the Olympics. Choden faced India's Reena Kumari in the second round, the pair posting identical scores of 134 points over the regulation eighteen arrows. On the subsequent tie-breaking arrow Kumari outscored Choden by seven points to four. Choden blamed her nerves for shooting so low.

Choden retired from archery in 2005 but returned to the sport as a coach in 2007. She coached the only Bhutanese archer at the 2012 Olympic Games, Sherab Zam.

She appeared in the 2004 Arte documentary Die Bogenschützin von Bhutan.
