= Sherab Zam =

Bhutanese archer

Personal information
- Nationality: Bhutan
- Born: October 10, 1983 (age 42) Kashithang, Dagana District, Bhutan
- Years active: 2005—2014
- Height: 152 cm (5 ft 0 in)
- Weight: 51 kg (112 lb)

Sport
- Country: Bhutan
- Sport: Target archery

Sherab Zam (10 October 1983) is a Bhutanese archer. she was selected to be Bhutan’s flagbearer and a competitor at the 2012 Summer Olympics. Later in life she became a coach for various archery teams

== Biography ==
Zam was born on 10 October 1983. Although she did archery as a child, she returned to the sport in 2005 after seeing a newspaper ad for the Bhutanese national team tryouts. In 2012, she qualified for the Summer Olympics through an invitation from the Tripartite Commission. In an interview before the Games with Reuters, Zam said that, "Participation is more important than winning a medal." Although she didn’t own a bow, her training included preparation in South Korea and India. Her coach for the women’s individual archery event, Tshering Choden, had represented Bhutan at the 2000 and 2004 Summer Olympics. The two trained for several weeks in the Netherlands as part of a Dutch-Bhutanese exchange program. Zam was chosen to be Bhutan's flagbearer for both the opening and closing ceremonies. In the ranking round, she placed 61st out of 64 competitors and was eliminated in the Round of 32 after a 0–6 loss to American archer Khatuna Lorig. After her competition, she said, "I am not that good at archery but I love it. It was so good to meet world ranking archers who are famous and to watch how they do it. I have learnt a lot from them." She also said that meeting Queen Elizabeth II was the highlight of her time in London. In January 2014, she left the national team and shifted to coaching. Since then, she has been an assistant coach for the Bhutanese national archery team and a coach at Chundu Armed Forces Public School.
