= Pema Tshering =

Bhutanese archer

Personal information
- Nationality: Bhutanese
- Born: 15 July 1951 (age 74); Samdrup Jongkhar, Bhutan

Sport
- Sport: Archery

Pema Tshering (born 15 July 1951), is an archer who represented Bhutan internationally.

Tshering competed for Bhutan at the 1988 Summer Olympics held in Seoul and the 1992 Summer Olympics in Barcelona, he finished 76th in Seoul and finished one place better 75th in Barcelona, in the team events they finished 22nd and 20th respectively .
