= Bhutan Olympic Committee =

National Olympic Committee

- Country: Bhutan
- Code: BHU
- Created: 23 November 1983
- Recognized: 1983
- Continental Association: OCA
- Headquarters: Thimphu, Bhutan
- President: Prince Dasho Jigyel Ugyen Wangchuck
- Secretary General: Sonam Karma Tshering
- Website: bhutanolympiccommittee.org

The Bhutan Olympic Committee (BOC) is the National Olympic Committee (NOC) representing Bhutan. It was founded in early 1983 and became a member of the International Olympic Committee (IOC) on 23 November 1983. Bhutan satisfied the IOC's criterion of five national sports federations recognised by its international sports federations to get recognised. Its predecessor was the National Sports Association of Bhutan, which was established in 1972. The current president has been Prince Jigyel Ugyen Wangchuck since 2009. Its current secretary general has been Sonam Karma Tshering since 2010. The NOC is a signatory to the World Anti-Doping Code published by the World Anti-Doping Agency. It has affiliations with various national Olympic committees, including the Bhutan Archery Federation. A documentary was filmed about a football match between its football team, and the lowest ranked Montserrat team. In addition to the IOC, the BOC is also part of the five other international sports bodies: the Association of National Olympic Committees, Olympic Council of Asia, South Asia Olympic Council, Asia-Pacific Oceana Sports Assembly, and Far East and South Pacific Games Federation for the Disabled.

== History ==
The National Sports Association of Bhutan (NSAB) was established in 1972 and was the precursor of the Bhutan Olympic Committee (BOC). The BOC was recognised by the International Olympic Committee (IOC) on 23 November 1983, (Note: Olympedia states it was given recognition by the IOC in April 1984.) after being founded in February of that year by the former Foreign Minister of Bhutan, Lyonpo Dawa Tsering. In addition to the IOC, the BOC is also part of the five other international sports bodies: the Association of National Olympic Committees, Olympic Council of Asia, South Asia Olympic Council, Asia-Pacific Oceana Sports Assembly, and Far East and South Pacific Games Federation for the Disabled. To be recognised by the IOC it needed a minimum of five National Sports Federation, which it achieved.

In July 2003, the Department for Youth, Culture & Sports of Bhutan was established under the aegis of the Ministry of Education, with the objective to develop “a holistic approach and policy for sports and social development.”

Bhutan and the Netherlands were involved in a cooperation programme starting 2001. This programme's function is to improve archery, a national sport in Bhutan. The intention was for Bhutan to become one of the leading countries in Olympic archery at the 2012 Games. The bilateral cooperation resulted in the publication of a book, in 2004, on traditional and modern archery in Bhutan and the Netherlands, and a documentary film on Bhutan Olympic Archery that was screened in Germany and other international channels. Similar cooperation was extended to football by the Royal Netherlands Football Association (KNVB). In 2004 the Bhutan Archery Federation was honored with a Prince Claus Award from the Netherlands.

A 2003 documentary film known as The Other Final was filmed based on a special football match arranged by Fédération Internationale de Football Association (FIFA) that was played between the second lowest-ranked Bhutan and lowest-ranked Montserrat in 2002.

== Facilities and management ==
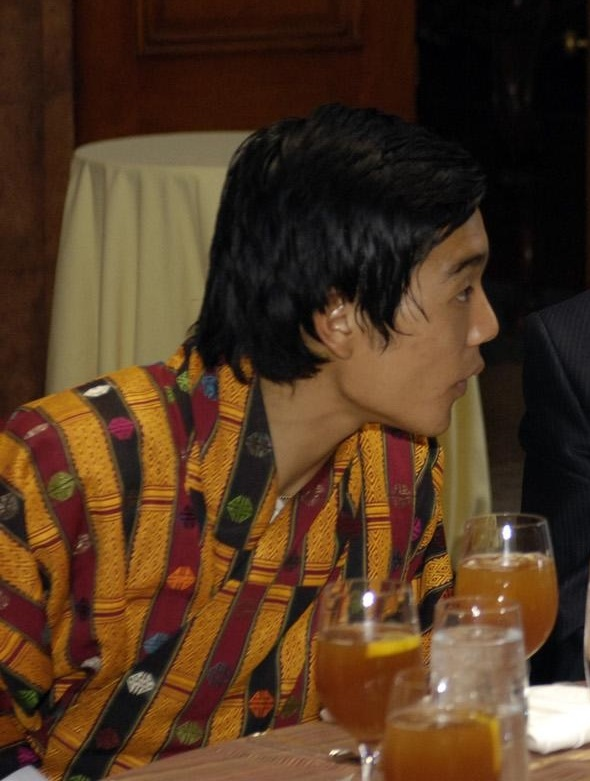
President Wangchuck

The committee's headquarters were moved in 2023 to the new Olympasia House with assistance from the Olympic Council of Asia. It was inaugurated on 30 March 2023. As of 2025, its president is Prince Jigyel Ugyen Wangchuck, serving since 2009 as its seventh president. As of 2025, its secretary general is Sonam Karma Tshering, and has been since 2010. The NOC is a signatory to the World Anti-Doping Code published by the World Anti-Doping Agency.

Presidents
#	Name	Term Start	Term End
1	Lyonpo Dawa Tsering	1983	1996
2	Lyonpo Dago Tshering	1996	1998
3	Lyonpo Sangay Ngedup	1998	2003
4	Lyonpo Thinley Gyamtsho	2003	2005
5	Lyonpo Ugyen Tshering	2006	2006
6	Lyonpo Kinzang Dorji	2006	2009
7	Jigyel Ugyen Wangchuck	2009	Incumbent

Secretary Generals
#	Name	Term Start	Term End
1	Gulam Rasul	1983	1986
2	Thinley Dorji	1986	1986
3	Penden Wangchuk	1986	1992
4	Dhruba K. Chhetri	1992	2005
5	Pema Tenzin	2005	2007
6	Karma Wangchuk	2008	2010
7	Sonam Karma Tshering	2010	Incumbent

== Events ==
=== Olympics ===
Bhutan first participated at the Olympic Games in 1984, and have competed in every Summer Olympic Games since then. The country has not competed at the Winter Olympic Games, or ever won a medal. In its first seven Olympics, 1984 through 2008, Bhutan competed only in archery, but in 2012 it also competed in shooting.

The delegation that Bhutan sent to the 1984 Summer Olympics consisted of six athletes competing in archery. Overall, the best result was Sonam Chuki, coming in 43rd, and the worst was Lhendup Tshering, coming 60th. Bhutan sent three archers to the 1988 Summer Olympics, none of them advanced past the ranking round, either as teams or as individuals. As individuals, their best placement was 73rd and the lowest was 80th. As a team, their placement was 22nd. The nation sent a delegation of six archers to compete at the 1992 Summer Olympics. None of the Bhutanese archers advanced past the ranking round, either as teams or as individuals. The Bhutanese women's team was the only team to not advance to the Round of 16 in its event.

The Bhutanese delegation that competed at the 1996 Summer Olympics consisted of two archers. Neither of them advanced past the Round of 64, with both of them being defeated by Ukrainians. Bhutan competed at the 2000 Summer Olympics with two archers. Neither of the archers advanced past the Round of 64. Bhutan's delegation at the 2004 Summer Olympics consisted of two athletes competing in archery. One of them, Tashi Peljor, defeated his opponent in the Round of 64 and advanced to the Round of 32, where he lost. Tshering Choden also won in the first round and advanced to the Round of 32, where she tied, before losing in a tiebreaker. As of 2024, these are the best Bhutanese results at the Games.

Bhutan sent a delegation of two archers to compete in the 2008 Summer Olympics. Neither won their first-round match. Bhutan sent a team of two to compete at the 2012 Summer Olympics in London, which took place from 27 July to 12 August 2012. This marked the nation's eighth appearance at the Summer Olympics and the first in which the nation competed in a sport other than archery. The Bhutanese delegation included archer Sherab Zam and shooter Kunzang Choden. Zam was the flag bearer for both the opening and closing ceremonies. Neither of Bhutan's athletes progressed beyond the first round of their events. Bhutan was one of only two countries to have a female-only team at the 2012 Games. Bhutan competed at the 2016 Summer Olympics with two athletes. One athlete, Karma, was eliminated in the Round of 64, while Lenchu Kunzang was eliminated from the competition after the shooting qualification round.

The Bhutanese team competed at the 2020 Summer Olympics with a delegation of four athletes. Every competitor was eliminated in the earliest round possible. When Bhutan competed at the 2024 Summer Olympics, its delegation consisted of three athletes. Each one lost at the earliest possible round.

== National Sports Federations ==
National Sports Federations of Bhutan
Sport	Body	Federation	Refs
Athletics	Bhutan Amateur Athletics Federation	IAAF	
Archery	Bhutan Archery Federation	FITA	
Aquatics	Bhutan Aquatics Federation	FINA	
Badminton	Bhutan Badminton Federation	BWF	
Basketball	Bhutan Basketball Federation	FIBA	
Boxing	Bhutan Boxing Federation	IBA	
Canoeing	Bhutan Canoeing Federation	ICF	
Cycling	Bhutan Cycling Federation	UCI	
Football	Bhutan Football Federation	FIFA	
Handball	Bhutan Handball Federation	IHF	
Judo	Bhutan Judo Federation	IJF	
Shooting	Bhutan Shooting Federation	ISSF	
Table tennis	Bhutan Table Tennis Federation	ITTF	
Taekwondo	Bhutan Taekwondo Federation	WT	
Tennis	Bhutan Tennis Federation	ITF	
Volleyball	Bhutan Volleyball Federation	FIVB	
Weightlifting	Bhutan Weightlifting Federation	IWF	

== Honours ==
- Order of the Beloved Son of the Dragon (18 December 2023)
