= Jubzhang =

Bhutanese archer (born 1971)

Personal information
- Nationality: Bhutanese
- Born: 7 May 1971 (age 53)

Sport
- Sport: Archery

Jubzhang Jubzhang (born 7 May 1971) is a Bhutanese archer. He competed at the 1992, 1996 and 2000 Summer Olympics in the men's individual event. In 2000, he "bowed out" in his opening match to Nico Hendrickx. Although experienced at Olympic archery his own nation's different style of play may have been a factor. He now owns a bowtech shop, dealing with all the kits related to archery. In Bhutan the bow is made of bamboo, no animals are killed to make the arrows because of their Buddhist beliefs, they shoot from further away, the competition goes on for four days, and archery events involve drinking large quantities of alcohol.
