= 1999 European Beach Volleyball Championships =

International beach volleyball competition

The 1999 European Beach Volleyball Championships were held from August 24 to August 27, 1999, in Palma de Mallorca, Spain. It was the seventh official edition of the men's event, which started in 1993, while the women competed for the sixth time.

== Men's competition ==
- A total number of 32 participating couples

RANK	FINAL RANKING
1st place, gold medalist(s)	Martin Laciga and Paul Laciga (SUI)
2nd place, silver medalist(s)	Javier Bosma and Fabio Diez (ESP)
3rd place, bronze medalist(s)	Jan Kvalheim and Björn Maaseide (NOR)
4.	Nikolas Berger and Oliver Stamm (AUT)
5.	Stéphane Canet and Mathieu Hamel (FRA)
5.	Dmitry Karasev and Sergey Sayfulin (RUS)
7.	Maurizio Pimponi and Andrea Raffaelli (ITA)
7.	Sascha Heyer and Martin Tschudi (SUI)
9.	Sergey Ermishin and Mikhail Kouchnerev (RUS)
9.	Vegard Høidalen and Jørre Kjemperud (NOR)
9.	Milan Dzavoronok and Marek Pakosta (CZE)
9.	Jean-Philippe Jodard and Christian Penigaud (FRA)
13.	José Pedrosa and José Teixeira (POR)
13.	Oliver Oetke and Andreas Scheuerpflug (GER)
13.	Christoph Dieckmann and Markus Dieckmann (GER)
13.	Guilherm Deulofeu and Eric Guissart (FRA)
17.	Jörg Ahmann and Axel Hager (GER)
17.	Bartosz Bachorski and Janusz Bulkowski (POL)
17.	Javier Luna and Yoyi Rodriguez (ESP)
17.	Björn Berg and Simon Dahl (SWE)
17.	Kjell Göranson and Iver Horrem (NOR)
17.	Markus Egger and Bernhard Vesti (SUI)
17.	David Andersson and Pelle Magnusson (SWE)
17.	Peter Gartmayer and Robert Nowotny (AUT)
25.	Harald Dobeiner and Gernot Leitner (AUT)
25.	Simone Bendandi and Fosco Cicola (ITA)
25.	Petr Chromy and Dalibor Luska (CZE)
25.	Kaarel Kais and Kristjan Kais (EST)
25.	Thanassis Michalopoulos and Manolis Roumeliotis (GRE)
25.	Ilias Arabatzis and Georgios Giatsis (GRE)
25.	Dariusz Parkitny and Jaroslaw Piotrowski (POL)
25.	Raul Aro Perez and Francisco Rodriguez (ESP)

== Women's competition ==
- A total number of 32 participating couples

RANK	FINAL RANKING
1st place, gold medalist(s)	Laura Bruschini and Annamaria Solazzi (ITA)
2nd place, silver medalist(s)	Anabelle Prawerman and Cécile Rigaux (FRA)
3rd place, bronze medalist(s)	Eva Celbova and Sona Novakova (CZE)
4.	Ulrike Schmidt and Gudi Staub (GER)
5.	Rebekka Kadijk and Debora Schoon-Kadijk (NED)
5.	Cristina Pereira and Maria José Schuller (POR)
7.	Ines Pianka and Stephanie Pohl (GER)
7.	Anna Bobrova and Olga Matveeva (RUS)
9.	Vasso Karadassiou and Efi Sfyri (GRE)
9.	Martina Hudcova and Tereza Tobiasova (CZE)
9.	Solvi Byberg and Heidi Larsen (NOR)
9.	Annalea Hartmann and Nicole Schnyder-Benoit (SUI)
13.	Maike Friedrichsen and Danja Müsch (GER)
13.	Daniela Gattelli and Lucilla Perrotta (ITA)
13.	Isabelle Chiaradia and Isabelle Fontana (SUI)
13.	Susanne Glesnes and Kathrine Maaseide (NOR)
17.	Sonia Alonso and Olena Zalubovskaya (ESP)
17.	Audrey Cooper and Amanda Glover (ENG)
17.	Daniela Costa and Ana Duarte (POR)
17.	Marit Erlandsen and Eva Roald Ofstaas (NOR)
17.	Efthalia Koutroumanidou and Slavroula Theodorou (GRE)
17.	Veronika Haschka and Michaela Meissinger (AUT)
17.	Katarina Mizdosova and Katarina Rimovska (SVK)
17.	Marieke Veldhuizen and Anouk Zinger (NED)
25.	Susana Gomez and Ester Ribera (ESP)
25.	Denise Austin and Monique Oliver (ENG)
25.	Petra Ekblom and Maria Tvede (SWE)
25.	Sabina Basagic and Sara Montagnolli (AUT)
25.	Mazgorzata Aleksandrowska and Agata Tekiel (POL)
25.	Hana Opatovska and Zuzana Opatovska (SVK)
25.	Christine Mellitzer and Katharina Munchmeyer (AUT)
25.	Nadia Erni and Karin Trussel (SUI)
