= Swatch FIVB World Tour 2002 =

Tournament details
- Host country: Various
- Dates: 5 June – 6 October 2002

The Swatch FIVB World Tour 2002 was the official international beach volleyball tour for 2002.

The USA won nine out of the 11 women's tournaments, but Brazil won six out of the ten men's tournaments.

== Grand Slam ==
There were two Grand Slam tournaments. These events give a higher number of points and more money than the rest of the tournaments.

- Marseille, France – World Series 13 Grand Slam, 16–21 July 2002
- Klagenfurt, Austria – A1 Grand Slam presented by Nokia, 31 July–4 August 2002

== Schedule ==
Key

Grand Slam
Open tournaments

== Tournament results ==
=== Women ===
Tournament	Champions	Runners-up	Third place	Fourth place
Madrid Open; Madrid, Spain; US$150,000; 5–9 June 2002	Kerri Walsh Jennings (USA); Misty May-Treanor (USA); 23-21, 21–14	Ana Paula Connelly (BRA); Tatiana Minello (BRA)	Natalie Cook (AUS); Kerri Pottharst (AUS); 21–10, 21–17	Mônica Rodrigues (BRA); Alexandra Fonseca (BRA)
Gstaad Open; Gstaad, Switzerland; US$150,000; 18–22 June 2002	Kerri Walsh Jennings (USA); Misty May-Treanor (USA); 21-17, 21–17	Adriana Behar (BRA); Shelda Bede (BRA)	Natalie Cook (AUS); Kerri Pottharst (AUS); 21–19, 21–15	Mônica Rodrigues (BRA); Alexandra Fonseca (BRA)
Stavanger Open; Stavanger, Norway; US$150,000; 2–6 July 2002	Holly McPeak (USA); Elaine Youngs (USA); 21-17, 16–21, 15–11	Natalie Cook (AUS); Kerri Pottharst (AUS)	Adriana Behar (BRA); Shelda Bede (BRA); 11-21, 21–18, 15–13	Kerri Walsh Jennings (USA); Misty May-Treanor (USA)
Montreal Open; Montreal, Canada; US$150,000; 09–13 July 2002	Kerri Walsh Jennings (USA); Misty May-Treanor (USA); 21-18, 25–23	Adriana Behar (BRA); Shelda Bede (BRA)	Holly McPeak (USA); Elaine Youngs (USA); 21-16, 20–22, 15–12	Natalie Cook (AUS); Kerri Pottharst (AUS)
Marseille Grand Slam; Marseille, France; US$200,000; 16-20 July 2002	Holly McPeak (USA); Elaine Youngs (USA); 21-17, 21–12	Kerri Walsh Jennings (USA); Misty May-Treanor (USA)	Natalie Cook (AUS); Kerri Pottharst (AUS); 21–13, 22–20	Adriana Behar (BRA); Shelda Bede (BRA)
Rhodes Open; Rhodes, Greece; US$150,000; 24–28 July 2002	Holly McPeak (USA); Elaine Youngs (USA); 21-17, 21–16	Natalie Cook (AUS); Kerri Pottharst (AUS)	Effrosyni Sfyri (GRE); Vasso Karantasiou (GRE); 21-17, 25–23	Marrit Leenstra (NED); Rebekka Kadijk (NED)
Klagenfurt Grand Slam; Klagenfurt, Austria; US$200,000; 31 July–3 August 2002	Kerri Walsh Jennings (USA); Misty May-Treanor (USA); 21-19, 21–18	Adriana Behar (BRA); Shelda Bede (BRA)	Holly McPeak (USA); Elaine Youngs (USA); 21–17, 21–15	Ryo Tokuno (JPN); Chiaki Kusuhara (JPN)
Osaka Open; Osaka, Japan; US$150,000; 07–11 August 2002	Adriana Behar (BRA); Shelda Bede (BRA); 21-17, 14–21, 18–16	Ana Paula Connelly (BRA); Tatiana Minello (BRA)	Kerri Walsh Jennings (USA); Misty May-Treanor (USA); 18-21, 21–12, 15–8	Marrit Leenstra (NED); Rebekka Kadijk (NED)
Maoming Open; Maoming, China; US$150,000; 14–18 August 2002	Kerri Walsh Jennings (USA); Misty May-Treanor (USA); 12-21, 21–15, 19–17	Holly McPeak (USA); Elaine Youngs (USA)	Natalie Cook (AUS); Kerri Pottharst (AUS); 21-17, 22–20	Adriana Behar (BRA); Shelda Bede (BRA)
Mallorca Open; Mallorca, Spain; US$150,000; 03–7 September 2002	Adriana Behar (BRA); Shelda Bede (BRA); 21-13, 17–21, 16–14	Kerri Walsh Jennings (USA); Misty May-Treanor (USA)	Ana Paula Connelly (BRA); Tatiana Minello (BRA); 21-10, 21–19	Soňa Nováková (CZE); Eva Celbová-Ryšavá (CZE)
Vitória Open; Vitória, Brazil; US$150,000; 17–22 September 2002	Holly McPeak (USA); Elaine Youngs (USA); 21-13, 19–21, 15–10	Kerri Walsh Jennings (USA); Misty May-Treanor (USA)	Ana Paula Connelly (BRA); Tatiana Minello (BRA); 21-17, 21–18	Adriana Behar (BRA); Shelda Bede (BRA)

=== Men ===
Tournament	Champions	Runners-up	Third place	Fourth place
Berlin Open; Berlin, Germany; US$150,000; 12–16 June 2002	Rogério "Pará" Ferreira (BRA); Harley Marques (BRA); 25-23, 19–21, 15–10	Mariano Baracetti (ARG); Martín Conde (ARG)	Markus Dieckmann (GER); Jonas Reckermann (GER); 21-12, 18–21, 15–10	John Child (CAN); Mark Heese (CAN)
Gstaad Open; Gstaad, Switzerland; US$150,000; 19–23 June 2002	Mariano Baracetti (ARG); Martín Conde (ARG); 25-23, 19–21, 15–10	Márcio Araújo (BRA); Benjamin Insfran (BRA)	Kevin Wong (USA); Stein Metzger (USA); 21-12, 18–21, 15–10	Franco Neto (BRA); Roberto Lopes (BRA)
Stavanger Open; Stavanger, Norway; US$150,000; 3–7 July 2002	Emanuel Rego (BRA); Tande Ramos (BRA); 22-20, 18–21, 19–17	Ricardo Santos (BRA); José Loiola (BRA)	Patrick Heuscher (SUI); Stefan Kobel (SUI) walkover	Rogério "Pará" Ferreira (BRA); Harley Marques (BRA)
Montreal Open; Montreal, Canada; US$150,000; 10–14 July 2002	Ricardo Santos (BRA); José Loiola (BRA); 21-18, 24–22	John Child (CAN); Mark Heese (CAN)	Kevin Wong (USA); Stein Metzger (USA); 21-15, 18–21, 15–13	Mariano Baracetti (ARG); Martín Conde (ARG)
Marseille Grand Slam; Marseille, France; US$200,000; 17–21 July 2002	Ricardo Santos (BRA); José Loiola (BRA); 19-21, 21–16, 15–9	Francisco Álvarez (CUB); Juan Rossell (CUB)	Emanuel Rego (BRA); Tande Ramos (BRA); 21-15, 26–24	Mariano Baracetti (ARG); Martín Conde (ARG)
Espinho Open; Espinho, Portugal; US$150,000; 24–28 July 2002	Kevin Wong (USA); Stein Metzger (USA); 17-21, 24–22, 15–12	Márcio Araújo (BRA); Benjamin Insfran (BRA)	Ricardo Santos (BRA); José Loiola (BRA); 22-20, 21–10	Mariano Baracetti (ARG); Martín Conde (ARG)
Klagenfurt Grand Slam; Klagenfurt, Austria; US$200,000; 1–4 August 2002	Ricardo Santos (BRA); José Loiola (BRA); 21-16, 21–18	Markus Egger (SUI); Sascha Heyer (SUI)	Vegard Høidalen (NOR); Jørre Kjemperud (NOR); 21-18, 21–14	Márcio Araújo (BRA); Benjamin Insfran (BRA)
Cádiz Open; Cádiz, Spain; US$150,000; 07–11 August 2002	Martin Laciga (SUI); Paul Laciga (SUI); 21-18, 21–17	Jody Holden (CAN); Conrad Leinemann (CAN)	Emanuel Rego (BRA); Tande Ramos (BRA); 21-17, 21–18	Mariano Baracetti (ARG); Martín Conde (ARG)
Mallorca Open; Mallorca, Spain; US$150,000; 04–8 September 2002	Martin Laciga (SUI); Paul Laciga (SUI); 21-17, 27–25	Márcio Araújo (BRA); Benjamin Insfran (BRA)	Emanuel Rego (BRA); Ricardo Santos (BRA); 21-15, 24–22	Rogério "Pará" Ferreira (BRA); Harley Marques (BRA)
Fortaleza Open; Fortaleza, Brazil; US$150,000; 01–6 October 2002	Márcio Araújo (BRA); Benjamin Insfran (BRA); 22-20, 21–17	Kevin Wong (USA); Stein Metzger (USA)	Emanuel Rego (BRA); Ricardo Santos (BRA) walkover	Jefferson Bellaguarda (BRA); Dagoberto Dultra Júnior (BRA)

== Rankings ==
=== Men ===
Top 10 Rankings as of October 8, 2002.
Rank	Pair	Points	Best Finish
1	(Argentina) Mariano Baracetti & Martín Conde	2,030	1st (1 time)
2	(Brazil) Márcio Araújo & Benjamin Insfran	1,964	1st (1 time)
3	(Brazil) Ricardo Santos & José Loiola	1,820	1st (3 times)
4	(Switzerland) Martin Laciga & Paul Laciga	1,700	1st (2 times)
5	(Canada) John Child & Mark Heese	1,540	2nd (1 time)
6	(United States) Kevin Wong & Stein Metzger	1,510	1st (1 time)
7	(Brazil) Emanuel Rego & Tande Ramos	1,500	1st (1 time)
8	(Norway) Vegard Høidalen & Jørre Kjemperud	1,320	3rd (1 time)
9	(Switzerland) Patrick Heuscher & Stefan Kobel	1,194	3rd (1 time)
10	(Brazil) Rogério "Pará" Ferreira & Harley Marques	1,148	1st (1 time)

=== Women ===
Top 10 Rankings as of October 8, 2002.
Rank	Pair	Points	Best Finish
1	(United States) Kerri Walsh Jennings & Misty May-Treanor	3,070	1st (5 times)
2	(Brazil) Adriana Behar & Shelda Bede	2,740	1st (2 times)
3	(Australia) Natalie Cook & Kerri Pottharst	2,370	2nd (2 times)
4	(United States) Holly McPeak & Elaine Youngs	2,310	1st (4 times)
5	(Brazil) Ana Paula Connelly & Tatiana Minello	2,280	2nd (2 times)
6	(Italy) Daniela Gattelli & Lucilla Perrotta	1,640	5th (4 times)
7	(Brazil) Leila Barros & Sandra Pires	1,630	5th (6 times)
8	(Brazil) Mônica Rodrigues & Alexandra Fonseca	1,400	4th (2 times)
9	(Netherlands) Rebekka Kadijk & Marrit Leenstra	1,390	4th (2 times)
10	(Germany) Stephanie Pohl & Okka Rau	1,200	5th (2 times)

== Medal table ==
Rank	Nation	Gold	Silver	Bronze	Total
1	United States	10	5	5	20
2	Brazil	8	9	8	25
3	Switzerland	2	1	1	4
4	Argentina	1	1	0	2
5	Australia	0	2	4	6
6	Canada	0	2	0	2
7	Cuba	0	1	0	1
8	Germany	0	0	1	1
8	Greece	0	0	1	1
8	Norway	0	0	1	1
Totals (10 entries)		21	21	21	63
