= 2001 European Beach Volleyball Championships =

International beach volleyball competition

The 2001 European Beach Volleyball Championship were held from September 6 to September 9, 2001, in Jesolo, near Venice, Italy. It was the ninth official edition of the men's event, which started in 1993, while the women competed for the eighth time.

== Men's competition ==
- A total number of 24 participating couples

RANK	FINAL RANKING
1st place, gold medalist(s)	Markus Egger and Sascha Heyer (SUI)
2nd place, silver medalist(s)	Martin Laciga and Paul Laciga (SUI)
3rd place, bronze medalist(s)	Vegard Høidalen and Jørre Kjemperud (NOR)
4.	Clemens Doppler and Peter Gartmayer (AUT)
5.	Jānis Grīnbergs and Andris Krūmiņš (LAT)
5.	João Brenha and Miguel Maia (POR)
7.	Bartosz Bachorski and Janusz Bulkowski (POL)
7.	Drazan Slacanin and Markus Dieckmann (GER)
9.	Sergey Ermishin and Mikhail Kouchnerev (RUS)
9.	Patrick Heuscher and Stefan Kobel (SUI)
9.	Oliver Oetke and Andreas Scheuerpflug (GER)
9.	Maurizio Pimponi and Andrea Raffaelli (ITA)
13.	Nikolas Berger and Oliver Stamm (AUT)
13.	Björn Berg and Simon Dahl (SWE)
13.	Kaarel Kais and Kristjan Kais (EST)
13.	Iver Horrem and Bjørn Maaseide (NOR)
17.	Javier Bosma and Antonio Cotrino (ESP)
17.	Michal Biza and Michal Palinek (CZE)
17.	Agustin Correa and Fabio Diez (ESP)
17.	Dmitry Karasev and Oleg Kiselev (RUS)
17.	Stéphane Canet and Mathieu Hamel (FRA)
17.	José Pedrosa and José Teixeira (POR)
17.	Giuseppe Bua and Dio Lequaglie (ITA)
17.	Jörg Ahmann and Axel Hager (GER)

== Women's competition ==
- A total number of 24 participating couples

RANK	FINAL RANKING
1st place, gold medalist(s)	Vasso Karadassiou and Efi Sfyri (GRE)
2nd place, silver medalist(s)	Simone Kuhn and Nicole Schnyder-Benoit (SUI)
3rd place, bronze medalist(s)	Andrea Ahmann and Ulrike Schmidt (GER)
4.	Rebekka Kadijk and Marrit Leenstra (NED)
5.	Eva Celbová and Sona Novaková (CZE)
5.	Denise Koelliker and Karin Trussel (SUI)
7.	Cristina Pereira and Maria José Schuller (POR)
7.	Giseli Gavio and Annamaria Solazzi (ITA)
9.	Daniela Gattelli and Lucilla Perrotta (ITA)
9.	Lina Yanchulova and Petia Yanchulova (BUL)
9.	Susanne Glesnes and Kathrine Maaseide (NOR)
9.	Ildiko Ancsin and Anna Grozer (HUN)
13.	Margherita Chiavaro and Manuela Malerba (ITA)
13.	Maike Friedrichsen and Danja Müsch (GER)
13.	Krisztina Nagy and Katalin Schlegl (HUN)
13.	Marika Teknedzjanová and Tereza Tobiasová (CZE)
17.	Andrea Luge and Audrey Syren (FRA)
17.	Hana Opatovska and Zuzana Opatovska (SVK)
17.	Anna Voronova and Ekaterina Voronova (RUS)
17.	Inguna Minusa and Inga Pulina (LAT)
17.	Brigitte Stampfer and Michaela Meissinger (AUT)
17.	Barbara Fuchs and Sara Montagnolli (AUT)
17.	Mireya Kaup and Claudia Pavlicek (GER)
17.	Sabina Swoboda and Christine Mellitzer (AUT)
