= 2003 European Beach Volleyball Championships =

International beach volleyball competition

The 2003 European Beach Volleyball Championships were held from August 29 to September 1, 2003 in Alanya, Turkey. It was the eleventh official edition of the men's event, which started in 1993, while the women competed for the tenth time. For the first time the event was incorporated in the new CEV European Beach Volleyball Tour, a combined Grand Prix of three tournaments. The first one was staged in Zagreb, Croatia (June 20 to June 22), the second one in Rethymnon, Greece (July 9 to July 13).

== Men's competition ==
- A total number of 35 participating couples

RANK	FINAL RANKING
1st place, gold medalist(s)	Clemens Doppler and Nikolas Berger (AUT)
2nd place, silver medalist(s)	Markus Dieckmann and Jonas Reckermann (GER)
3rd place, bronze medalist(s)	Markus Egger and Sascha Heyer (SUI)
4.	Roman Arkaev and Dmitri Barsouk (RUS)
5.	Patrick Heuscher and Stefan Kobel (SUI)
5.	Julius Brink and Kjell Schneider (GER)
5.	Janis Grinbergs and Andris Krumins (LAT)
5.	Max Backer and Emiel Boersma (NED)
9.	Peter Gartmayer and Robert Nowotny (AUT)
9.	Kristjan Kais and Rivo Vesik (EST)
9.	Stéphane Canet and Mathieu Hamel (FRA)
9.	Jörg Ahmann and Axel Hager (GER)
9.	Haroldas Cyvas and Marius Vasiliauskas (LTU)
9.	Vegard Høidalen and Jørre Kjemperud (NOR)
9.	Martin Laciga and Paul Laciga (SUI)
9.	Mykola Babich and Dmytro Khudoley (UKR)
17.	Björn Berg and Simon Dahl (SWE)
17.	Kresimir Peric and Grga Trimcevski (CRO)
19.	Guilherm Deulofeu and Ogier Molinier (FRA)
19.	Pavlos Beligratis and Thanassis Michalopoulos (GRE)
19.	Boudewijn Maas and Bram Ronnes (NED)
19.	Anton Kulikovsky and Alexei Verbov (RUS)
19.	Juan Garcia Thompson and Antonio Cotrino (ESP)
19.	Bilal Tanriverdi and Fatih Tökel (TUR)
25.	Kevin Ces and Yannick Salvetti (FRA)
25.	Andreas Gortsianiouk and Panagiotis Mourtzios (GRE)
25.	Richard Kogel and Sander Mulder (NED)
25.	Javier Bosma and Raúl Mesa (ESP)
29.	Florian Gosch and Bernhard Strauss (AUT)
29.	Argo Arak and Kaarel Kais (EST)
29.	Jochem de Gruijter and Gijs Ronnes (NED)
29.	Iver Horrem and Bjørn Maaseide (NOR)
29.	Dmitry Karasev and Pavel Zaytsev (RUS)
29.	Mikhail Kouchnerev and Sergey Sayfulin (RUS)
29.	Muzaffer Mete Dalan and Kerem Pekunlu (TUR)

== Women's competition ==
- A total number of 36 participating couples

RANK	FINAL RANKING
1st place, gold medalist(s)	Stephanie Pohl and Okka Rau (GER)
2nd place, silver medalist(s)	Andrea Ahmann and Jana Vollmer (GER)
3rd place, bronze medalist(s)	Daniela Gattelli and Lucilla Perrotta (ITA)
4.	Rebekka Kadijk and Marrit Leenstra (NED)
5.	Katerina Tychnová and Marketa Tychnová (CZE)
5.	Vasso Karadassiou and Efi Sfyri (GRE)
5.	Olga Filina and Nadeida Zorina (RUS)
5.	Simone Kuhn and Nicole Schnyder-Benoit (SUI)
9.	Chrisi Gschweidl and Sabine Swoboda (AUT)
9.	Eva Celbová and Sona Novaková (CZE)
9.	Mari-Liis Graumann and Anna-Liisa Sutt (EST)
9.	Emilia Nyström and Erika Nyström (FIN)
9.	Inguna Minusa and Inga Pulina (LAT)
9.	Susanne Glesnes and Kathrine Maaseide (NOR)
9.	Nila Håkedal and Ingrid Tørlen (NOR)
9.	Svitlana Baburina and Galyna Osheyko (UKR)
17.	Judith Augoustides and Helke Claasen (GER)
17.	Ana Oblak and Mihela Sirk (SLO)
19.	Lina Yanchulova and Petia Yanchulova (BUL)
19.	Lenka Hajecková and Petra Novotná (CZE)
19.	Vassiliki Arvaniti and Efthalia Koutroumanidou (GRE)
19.	Nadia Erni and Karin Trussel (SUI)
19.	Dinah Kilchenmann and Lea Schwer (SUI)
19.	Bugra Eryildiz and Izolda Korfez (TUR)
25.	Tatiana Barerra and Claire Jaouen (FRA)
25.	Erzsébet Fésűs and Katalin Schlegl (HUN)
25.	Csilla Gudmann and Orsolya Mester (HUN)
25.	Ester Alcón and Cati Pol (ESP)
29.	Barbara Hansel and Sara Montagnolli (AUT)
29.	Denise Austin and Amanda Glover (ENG)
29.	Katerina Nikolaidou and Maria Tsiartsiani (GRE)
29.	Krisztina Nagy and Anita Petho (HUN)
29.	Lise Roald Hansen and Cecilie Josefsen (NOR)
29.	Annika Granström and Angelica Ljungquist (SWE)
29.	Ebru Algür and Sinem Beltan (TUR)
29.	Anastasiya Rayeva and Natalya Shumeyko (UKR)
