= 2001 Beach Volleyball World Championships =

- Dates: 1 August – 4 August

These page shows the results of the III Beach volleyball World Championships, held from August 1 to August 4, 2001, in Klagenfurt, Austria. It was the third official edition of this event, after ten unofficial championships (1987–1996) all held in Rio de Janeiro, and the second to be organized in Europe.

== Men's competition ==
=== Final ranking (top sixteen) ===
- A total number of 48 participating couples

Rank	Name Athletes	Seed
1st place, gold medalist(s)	Mariano Baracetti and Martín Conde (ARG)	4
2nd place, silver medalist(s)	José Loiola and Ricardo Santos (BRA)	10
3rd place, bronze medalist(s)	Vegard Høidalen and Jørre Kjemperud (NOR)	6
4.	Rob Heidger and Chip McCaw (USA)	18
5.	Tande Ramos and Emanuel Rego (BRA)	2
5.	Martin Laciga and Paul Laciga (SUI)	5
5.	Dain Blanton and Eric Fonoimoana (USA)	11
5.	Dax Holdren and Todd Rogers (USA)	23
9.	Nikolas Berger and Oliver Stamm (AUT)	1
9.	Stein Metzger and Kevin Wong (USA)	5
9.	Zé Marco de Melo and Rogério Ferreira (BRA)	7
9.	Sergey Ermishin and Mikhail Kouchnerev (RUS)	14
9.	Julien Prosser and Lee Zahner (AUS)	15
9.	Markus Dieckmann and Jonas Reckermann (GER)	20
9.	Dmitry Karasev and Pavel Zaitsev (RUS)	22
9.	João Brenha and Miguel Maia (POR)	27

== Women's competition ==
- A total number of 47 participating couples

=== Final ranking (top sixteen) ===
Rank	Name Athletes	Seed
1st place, gold medalist(s)	Shelda Bede and Adriana Behar (BRA)	1
2nd place, silver medalist(s)	Tatiana Minello and Sandra Pires (BRA)	3
3rd place, bronze medalist(s)	Eva Celbová and Sona Novaková (CZE)	12
4.	Barbra Fontana and Elaine Youngs (USA)	2
5.	Cláudia Oliveira and Jackie Silva (BRA)	8
5.	Rong Chi and Xiong Zi (CHN)	11
5.	Laura Bruschini and Annamaria Solazzi (ITA)	15
5.	Danalee Bragado and Ali Wood (USA)	21
9.	Natalie Cook and Kerri Pottharst (AUS)	4
9.	Misty May-Treanor and Kerri Walsh (USA)	6
9.	Dalixia Fernández and Tamara Larrea (CUB)	7
9.	Dianne DeNecochea and Liz Masakayan (USA)	14
9.	Daniela Gattelli and Lucilla Perrotta (ITA)	18
9.	Angela Clarke and Kylie Gerlic (AUS)	19
9.	Vasso Karadassiou and Efi Sfyri (GRE)	22
9.	Mayra García and Hilda Gaxiola (MEX)	39
