= European Beach Volleyball Championship =

European Beach Volleyball Championships
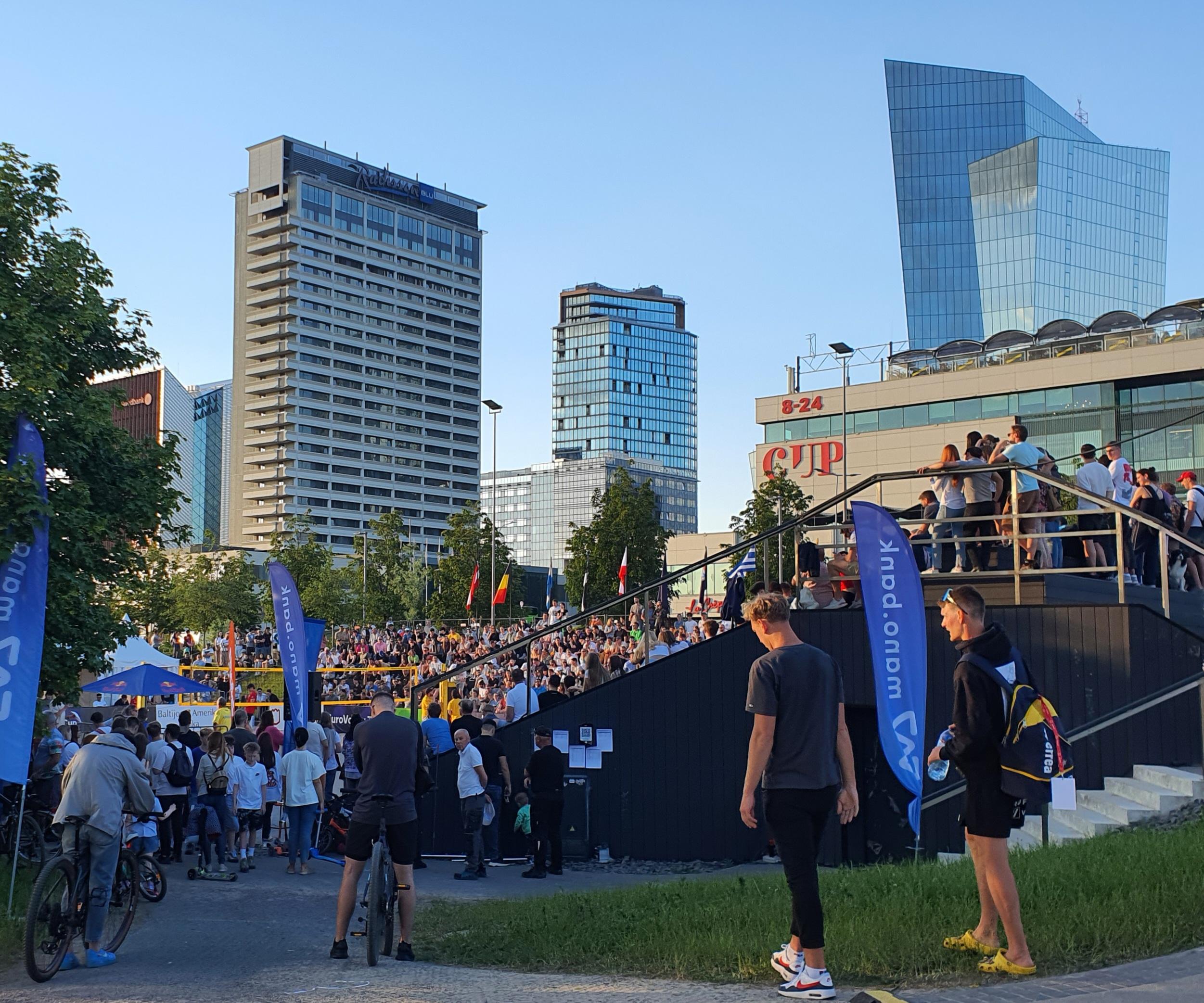
- 2024 CEV Beach Volley Nations Cup was held in Vilnius CBD
- Status: active
- Genre: sporting event
- Date: mid-year
- Frequency: annual
- Country: varying
- Inaugurated: 1993
- Organiser: European Volleyball Confederation
- 2026

The European Beach Volleyball Championship (or the Nestea European Championship Final) is a unisex sport competition for national teams in the sport of beach volleyball. The championship is held annually by the CEV (the European volleyball federation).

== Editions ==
Initially, in 1993, just men competed, but the following year a separate championship was held for women. The events have been combined since 1995.

Edition	Year	Host city	Host country	Events
1	1993	Almería	Spain	1
2	1994	Almería; Espinho	Spain; Portugal	1; 1
3	1995	Saint-Quay-Portrieux	France	2
4	1996	Pescara	Italy	2
5	1997	Riccione	Italy	2
6	1998	Rhodes	Greece	2
7	1999	Palma de Mallorca	Spain	2
8	2000	Getxo	Spain	2
9	2001	Jesolo	Italy	2
10	2002	Basel	Switzerland	2
11	2003	Alanya	Turkey	2
12	2004	Timmendorfer Strand	Germany	2
13	2005	Moscow	Russia	2
14	2006	The Hague	Netherlands	2
15	2007	Valencia	Spain	2
16	2008	Hamburg	Germany	2
17	2009	Sochi	Russia	2

Edition	Year	Host city	Host country	Events
18	2010	Berlin	Germany	2
19	2011	Kristiansand	Norway	2
20	2012	Scheveningen	Netherlands	2
21	2013	Klagenfurt	Austria	2
22	2014	Cagliari	Italy	2
23	2015	Klagenfurt	Austria	2
24	2016	Biel/Bienne	Switzerland	2
25	2017	Jūrmala	Latvia	2
26	2018	The Hague - Apeldoorn - Rotterdam - Utrecht	Netherlands	2
27	2019	Moscow	Russia	2
28	2020	Jūrmala	Latvia	2
29	2021	Vienna	Austria	2
30	2022^{1}	Munich	Germany	2
31	2023	Vienna	Austria	2
32	2024	The Hague - Apeldoorn - Arnhem	Netherlands	2
33	2025	Düsseldorf	Germany	2
34	2026	Stare Jabłonki	Poland	2

^{1} As part of the 2022 European Championships

== Results summary ==
=== Men's ===
Year	Gold	Silver	Bronze
1993; Details	France; Jean-Philippe Jodard; Christian Penigaud	Norway; Jan Kvalheim; Bjørn Maaseide	Italy; Andrea Ghiurghi; Dionisio Lequaglie
1994; Details	Norway; Jan Kvalheim; Bjørn Maaseide	Spain; Santiago Aguilera; Javier Bosma	Germany; Jörg Ahmann; Axel Hager
1995; Details	Netherlands; Marko Klok; Michiel van der Kuip	Czech Republic; Milan Džavoronok; Václav Fikar	Italy; Piero Antonini; Dionisio Lequaglie
1996; Details	Czech Republic; Marek Pakosta; Michal Palinek	Germany; Jörg Ahmann; Axel Hager	Italy; Andrea Ghiurghi; Nicola Grigolo
1997; Details	Norway; Vegard Høidalen; Jørre Kjemperud	Norway; Jan Kvalheim; Bjørn Maaseide	Switzerland; Martin Laciga; Paul Laciga
1998; Details	Switzerland; Martin Laciga; Paul Laciga	Norway; Jan Kvalheim; Bjørn Maaseide	Norway; Vegard Høidalen; Jørre Kjemperud
1999; Details	Switzerland; Martin Laciga; Paul Laciga	Spain; Javier Bosma; Fabio Díez	Norway; Jan Kvalheim; Bjørn Maaseide
2000; Details	Switzerland; Martin Laciga; Paul Laciga	Switzerland; Markus Egger; Sascha Heyer	Norway; Vegard Høidalen; Jørre Kjemperud
2001; Details	Switzerland; Markus Egger; Sascha Heyer	Switzerland; Martin Laciga; Paul Laciga	Norway; Vegard Høidalen; Jørre Kjemperud
2002; Details	Germany; Markus Dieckmann; Jonas Reckermann	Switzerland; Martin Laciga; Paul Laciga	Norway; Vegard Høidalen; Jørre Kjemperud
2003; Details	Austria; Nik Berger; Clemens Doppler	Germany; Markus Dieckmann; Jonas Reckermann	Switzerland; Markus Egger; Sascha Heyer
2004; Details	Germany; Markus Dieckmann; Jonas Reckermann	Switzerland; Markus Egger; Sascha Heyer	Switzerland; Patrick Heuscher; Stefan Kobel
2005; Details	Spain; Pablo Herrera; Raúl Mesa	Switzerland; Patrick Heuscher; Stefan Kobel	Germany; Markus Dieckmann; Jonas Reckermann
2006; Details	Germany; Julius Brink; Christoph Dieckmann	Netherlands; Jochem de Gruijter; Gijs Ronnes	Switzerland; Patrick Heuscher; Stefan Kobel
2007; Details	Austria; Clemens Doppler; Peter Gartmayer	Netherlands; Reinder Nummerdor; Richard Schuil	Germany; David Klemperer; Eric Koreng
2008; Details	Netherlands; Reinder Nummerdor; Richard Schuil	Germany; Kay Matysik; Stefan Uhmann	Russia; Dmitri Barsuk; Igor Kolodinsky
2009; Details	Netherlands; Reinder Nummerdor; Richard Schuil	Austria; Florian Gosch; Alexander Horst	Spain; Adrián Gavira; Pablo Herrera
2010; Details	Netherlands; Reinder Nummerdor; Richard Schuil	Austria; Clemens Doppler; Matthias Mellitzer	Latvia; Mārtiņš Pļaviņš; Jānis Šmēdiņš
2011; Details	Germany; Julius Brink; Jonas Reckermann	Germany; Jonathan Erdmann; Kay Matysik	Netherlands; Reinder Nummerdor; Richard Schuil
2012; Details	Germany; Julius Brink; Jonas Reckermann	Netherlands; Emiel Boersma; Daan Spijkers	Norway; Tarjei Skarlund; Martin Spinnangr
2013; Details	Spain; Adrián Gavira; Pablo Herrera	Latvia; Aleksandrs Samoilovs; Jānis Šmēdiņš	Poland; Grzegorz Fijalek; Mariusz Prudel
2014; Details	Italy; Daniele Lupo; Paolo Nicolai	Latvia; Aleksandrs Samoilovs; Jānis Šmēdiņš	Austria; Clemens Doppler; Alexander Horst
2015; Details	Latvia; Aleksandrs Samoilovs; Jānis Šmēdiņš	Italy; Adrian Carambula; Alex Ranghieri	Netherlands; Reinder Nummerdor; Christiaan Varenhorst
2016; Details	Italy; Daniele Lupo; Paolo Nicolai	Russia; Viacheslav Krasilnikov; Konstantin Semenov	Poland; Grzegorz Fijałek; Mariusz Prudel
2017; Details	Italy; Daniele Lupo; Paolo Nicolai	Latvia; Aleksandrs Samoilovs; Jānis Šmēdiņš	Netherlands; Alexander Brouwer; Robert Meeuwsen
2018; Details	Norway; Anders Mol; Christian Sørum	Latvia; Aleksandrs Samoilovs; Jānis Šmēdiņš	Spain; Adrián Gavira; Pablo Herrera
2019; Details	Norway; Anders Mol; Christian Sørum	Russia; Ilya Leshukov; Konstantin Semenov	Austria; Martin Ermacora; Moritz Pristauz
2020; Details	Norway; Anders Mol; Christian Sørum	Russia; Viacheslav Krasilnikov; Oleg Stoyanovskiy	Italy; Daniele Lupo; Paolo Nicolai
2021; Details	Norway; Anders Mol; Christian Sørum	Netherlands; Stefan Boermans; Yorick de Groot	Poland; Piotr Kantor; Bartosz Łosiak
2022; Details	Sweden; David Åhman; Jonatan Hellvig	Czech Republic; Ondřej Perušič; David Schweiner	Norway; Anders Mol; Christian Sørum
2023; Details	Sweden; David Åhman; Jonatan Hellvig	Netherlands; Leon Luini; Yorick de Groot	Ukraine; Sergiy Popov; Eduard Reznik
2024; Details	Latvia; Mārtiņš Pļaviņš; Kristiāns Fokerots	Germany; Nils Ehlers; Clemens Wickler	Netherlands; Steven van de Velde; Matthew Immers
2025; Details	Norway; Anders Mol; Christian Sørum	Sweden; David Åhman; Jonatan Hellvig	Netherlands; Alexander Brouwer; Steven van de Velde
2026; Details	Sweden; Jacob Nilsson; Elmer Andersson	Norway; Anders Mol; Christian Sørum	France; Téo Rotar; Arnaud Gauthier-Rat

=== Women's ===
Year	Gold	Silver	Bronze
1993; Details	No women's competition		
1994; Details	Germany; Beate Bühler; Danja Müsch	Czech Republic; Martina Hudcová; Dolores Storková	Italy; Cristiana Parenzan; Lucilla Perrotta
1995; Details	Germany; Cordula Borger; Beate Paetow	Norway; Merita Berntsen; Ragni Hestad	Germany; Beate Bühler; Danja Müsch
1996; Details	Czech Republic; Eva Celbová; Soňa Nováková	Germany; Beate Bühler; Danja Müsch	Italy; Laura Bruschini; Annamaria Solazzi
1997; Details	Italy; Laura Bruschini; Annamaria Solazzi	Italy; Daniela Gattelli; Lucilla Perrotta	Czech Republic; Eva Celbová; Soňa Nováková
1998; Details	Czech Republic; Eva Celbová; Soňa Nováková	Netherlands; Rebekka Kadijk; Debora Schoon-Kadijk	Italy; Laura Bruschini; Annamaria Solazzi
1999; Details	Italy; Laura Bruschini; Annamaria Solazzi	France; Anabelle Prawerman; Cécile Rigaux	Czech Republic; Eva Celbová; Soňa Nováková
2000; Details	Italy; Laura Bruschini; Annamaria Solazzi	Germany; Danja Müsch; Jana Vollmer	Netherlands; Rebekka Kadijk; Debora Schoon-Kadijk
2001; Details	Greece; Vasso Karantasiou; Effrosyni Sfyri	Switzerland; Simone Kuhn; Nicole Schnyder-Benoit	Germany; Andrea Ahmann; Ulrike Schmidt
2002; Details	Italy; Daniela Gattelli; Lucilla Perrotta	Netherlands; Rebekka Kadijk; Marrit Leenstra	Czech Republic; Eva Celbová; Soňa Nováková
2003; Details	Germany; Stephanie Pohl; Okka Rau	Germany; Andrea Ahmann; Jana Vollmer	Italy; Daniela Gattelli; Lucilla Perrotta
2004; Details	Switzerland; Simone Kuhn; Nicole Schnyder-Benoit	Norway; Susanne Glesnes; Kathrine Maaseide	Italy; Daniela Gattelli; Lucilla Perrotta
2005; Details	Greece; Vassiliki Arvaniti; Vasso Karantasiou	Netherlands; Rebekka Kadijk; Merel Mooren	Germany; Stephanie Pohl; Okka Rau
2006; Details	Russia; Alexandra Shiryayeva; Natalya Uryadova	Netherlands; Rebekka Kadijk; Merel Mooren	Norway; Nila Håkedal; Ingrid Tørlen
2007; Details	Greece; Vassiliki Arvaniti; Vasso Karantasiou	Germany; Sara Goller; Laura Ludwig	Norway; Nila Håkedal; Ingrid Tørlen
2008; Details	Germany; Sara Goller; Laura Ludwig	Norway; Nila Håkedal; Ingrid Tørlen	Norway; Susanne Glesnes; Kathrine Maaseide
2009; Details	Latvia; Inese Jursone; Inguna Minusa	Germany; Sara Goller; Laura Ludwig	Switzerland; Simone Kuhn; Nadine Zumkehr
2010; Details	Germany; Sara Goller; Laura Ludwig	Germany; Katrin Holtwick; Ilka Semmler	Finland; Emilia Nyström; Erika Nyström
2011; Details	Italy; Greta Cicolari; Marta Menegatti	Austria; Barbara Hansel; Sara Montagnolli	Germany; Sara Goller; Laura Ludwig
2012; Details	Netherlands; Sanne Keizer; Marleen van Iersel	Greece; Vassiliki Arvaniti; Maria Tsiartsiani	Spain; Elsa Baquerizo; Liliana Fernández
2013; Details	Austria; Doris Schwaiger; Stefanie Schwaiger	Spain; Elsa Baquerizo; Liliana Fernández	Germany; Laura Ludwig; Kira Walkenhorst
2014; Details	Netherlands; Madelein Meppelink; Marleen van Iersel	Switzerland; Tanja Goricanec; Tanja Hüberli	Germany; Laura Ludwig; Kira Walkenhorst
2015; Details	Germany; Laura Ludwig; Kira Walkenhorst	Russia; Ekaterina Birlova; Evgenia Ukolova	Poland; Monika Brzostek; Kinga Kołosińska
2016; Details	Germany; Laura Ludwig; Kira Walkenhorst	Czech Republic; Barbora Hermannová; Markéta Sluková	Germany; Karla Borger; Britta Büthe
2017; Details	Germany; Nadja Glenzke; Julia Großner	Czech Republic; Kristýna Kolocová; Michala Kvapilová	Germany; Chantal Laboureur; Julia Sude
2018; Details	Netherlands; Sanne Keizer; Madelein Meppelink	Switzerland; Nina Betschart; Tanja Hüberli	Czech Republic; Barbora Hermannová; Markéta Sluková
2019; Details	Latvia; Tīna Graudiņa; Anastasija Kravčenoka	Poland; Katarzyna Kociołek; Kinga Wojtasik	Spain; Elsa Baquerizo; Liliana Fernández
2020; Details	Switzerland; Joana Heidrich; Anouk Vergé-Dépré	Germany; Kim Behrens; Cinja Tillmann	Russia; Nadezda Makroguzova; Svetlana Kholomina
2021; Details	Switzerland; Nina Betschart; Tanja Hüberli	Netherlands; Raïsa Schoon; Katja Stam	Germany; Karla Borger; Julia Sude
2022; Details	Latvia; Tīna Graudiņa; Anastasija Kravčenoka	Switzerland; Nina Brunner; Tanja Hüberli	Netherlands; Raïsa Schoon; Katja Stam
2023; Details	Switzerland; Nina Brunner; Tanja Hüberli	Spain; Daniela Álvarez; Tania Moreno	Germany; Laura Ludwig; Louisa Lippmann
2024; Details	Germany; Svenja Müller; Cinja Tillmann	Italy; Valentina Gottardi; Marta Menegatti	Switzerland; Esmée Böbner; Zoé Vergé-Dépré
2025; Details	Ukraine; Maryna Hladun; Tetiana Lazarenko	France; Clémence Vieira; Aline Chamereau	Germany; Svenja Müller; Cinja Tillmann
2026; Details	Netherlands; Katja Stam; Raïsa Schoon	Spain; Sofía Izuzquiza; Tania Moreno	Latvia; Tīna Graudiņa; Anastasija Samoilova

== Medals ==
As of 2026 European Beach Volleyball Championships.

=== Men's ===
Rank	Nation	Gold	Silver	Bronze	Total
1	Norway	7	4	7	18
2	Germany	5	5	3	13
3	Netherlands	4	5	5	14
4	Switzerland	4	5	4	13
5	Italy	3	1	4	8
6	Sweden	3	1	0	4
7	Latvia	2	4	1	7
8	Austria	2	2	2	6
8	Spain	2	2	2	6
10	Czech Republic	1	2	0	3
11	France	1	0	1	2
12	Russia	0	3	1	4
13	Poland	0	0	3	3
14	Ukraine	0	0	1	1
Totals (14 entries)		34	34	34	102

=== Women's ===
Rank	Nation	Gold	Silver	Bronze	Total
1	Germany	9	7	11	27
2	Italy	5	2	5	12
3	Netherlands	4	5	2	11
4	Switzerland	4	4	2	10
5	Greece	3	1	0	4
6	Latvia	3	0	1	4
7	Czech Republic	2	3	4	9
8	Russia	1	1	1	3
9	Austria	1	1	0	2
10	Ukraine	1	0	0	1
11	Norway	0	3	3	6
12	Spain	0	3	2	5
13	France	0	2	0	2
14	Poland	0	1	1	2
15	Finland	0	0	1	1
Totals (15 entries)		33	33	33	99

=== Total ===
Rank	Nation	Gold	Silver	Bronze	Total
1	Germany	14	12	14	40
2	Netherlands	8	10	7	25
3	Switzerland	8	9	6	23
4	Italy	8	3	9	20
5	Norway	7	7	10	24
6	Latvia	5	4	2	11
7	Czech Republic	3	5	4	12
8	Austria	3	3	2	8
9	Greece	3	1	0	4
9	Sweden	3	1	0	4
11	Spain	2	5	4	11
12	Russia	1	4	2	7
13	France	1	2	1	4
14	Ukraine	1	0	1	2
15	Poland	0	1	4	5
16	Finland	0	0	1	1
Totals (16 entries)		67	67	67	201

== See also ==
- European U22 Beach Volleyball Championships
- FIVB Beach Volleyball World Championships
- Asian Beach Volleyball Championships
- African Beach Volleyball Championships
