= 2000 European Beach Volleyball Championships =

International beach volleyball competition

The 2000 European Beach Volleyball Championships were held from August 24 to August 27, 2000 in Bilbao, Spain. It was the eighth official edition of the men's event, which started in 1993, while the women competed for the seventh time.

== Men's competition ==
- A total number of 32 participating couples

| RANK | FINAL RANKING |
|---|---|
| 1st place, gold medalist(s) | Martin Laciga and Paul Laciga (SUI) |
| 2nd place, silver medalist(s) | Markus Egger and Sascha Heyer (SUI) |
| 3rd place, bronze medalist(s) | Vegard Høidalen and Jørre Kjemperud (NOR) |
| 4. | Dmitry Karasev and Sergey Sayfulin (RUS) |
| 5. | Martin Lebl and Michal Palinek (CZE) |
| 5. | Jan Kvalheim and Björn Maaseide (NOR) |
| 7. | Björn Berg and Simon Dahl (SWE) |
| 7. | Patrick Heuscher and Stefan Kobel (SUI) |
| 9. | Jörg Ahmann and Axel Hager (GER) |
| 9. | Janis Grinbergs and Andris Krumins (LAT) |
| 9. | Sergey Ermishin and Mikhail Kouchnerev (RUS) |
| 9. | Javier Bosma and Fabio Diez (ESP) |
| 13. | Nikolas Berger and Oliver Stamm (AUT) |
| 13. | Christoph Dieckmann and Markus Dieckmann (GER) |
| 13. | Kjell Arne Göranson and Iver Horrem (NOR) |
| 13. | Bartosz Bachorski and Janusz Bulkowski (POL) |
| 17. | Petr Chromy and Premysl Kubala (CZE) |
| 17. | Milan Dzavoronok and Marek Pakosta (CZE) |
| 17. | Jesper Hansen and Jens Larsen (DEN) |
| 17. | Kaarel Kais and Kristjan Kais (EST) |
| 17. | Stéphane Canet and Mathieu Hamel (FRA) |
| 17. | Maurizio Pimponi and Andrea Raffaelli (ITA) |
| 17. | José Pedrosa and José Teixeira (POR) |
| 17. | Javier Luna and Yoyi Rodriguez (ESP) |
| 25. | Peter Gartmayer and Robert Nowotny (AUT) |
| 25. | Paul Schroffenegger and Thomas Schroffenegger (AUT) |
| 25. | Thanassis Michalopoulos and Manolis Roumeliotis (GRE) |
| 25. | Richard Kogel and Bjorn Peynenburg (NED) |
| 25. | Rui Oliveira and Hugo Ribeiro (POR) |
| 25. | Raul Aro Perez and Francisco Rodriguez (ESP) |
| 25. | David Andersson and Per Kohler (SWE) |
| 25. | Yevgeniy Moroz and Vitaliy Stadnikov (UKR) |

== Women's competition ==
- A total number of 30 participating couples

| RANK | FINAL RANKING |
|---|---|
| 1st place, gold medalist(s) | Laura Bruschini and Annamaria Solazzi (ITA) |
| 2nd place, silver medalist(s) | Danja Müsch and Jana Vollmer (GER) |
| 3rd place, bronze medalist(s) | Rebekka Kadijk and Debora Schoon-Kadijk (NED) |
| 4. | Eva Celbova and Sona Novakova (CZE) |
| 5. | Anabelle Prawerman and Cécile Rigaux (FRA) |
| 5. | Cristina Pereira and Maria José Schuller (POR) |
| 7. | Lina Yanchulova and Petia Yanchulova (BUL) |
| 7. | Solvi Byberg and Heidi Larsen (NOR) |
| 9. | Martina Hudcova and Tereza Tobiasova (CZE) |
| 9. | Denise Austin and Monique Oliver (ENG) |
| 9. | Ines Pianka and Stephanie Pohl (GER) |
| 9. | Annalea Hartmann and Nicole Schnyder-Benoit (SUI) |
| 13. | Vasso Karadassiou and Rodi Ordoulidou (GRE) |
| 13. | Efthalia Koutroumanidou and Slavroula Theodorou (GRE) |
| 13. | Susanne Glesnes and Kathrine Maaseide (NOR) |
| 13. | Katarina Mizdosova and Katarina Rimovska (SVK) |
| 17. | Maria Holzman and Sara Montagnolli (AUT) |
| 17. | Lenka Hajeckova and Marika Teknedzjanova (CZE) |
| 17. | Ildiko Ancsin and Anna Grozer (HUN) |
| 17. | Nathalie Dambendzet and Gyöngyi Polanyi (HUN) |
| 17. | Daniela Costa and Ana Duarte (POR) |
| 17. | Hana Opatovska and Zuzana Opatovska (SVK) |
| 17. | Petra Ekblom and Karin Lundquist (SWE) |
| 17. | Denise Koelliker and Karin Trussel (SUI) |
| 25. | Sabina Basagic and Christine Mellitzer (AUT) |
| 25. | Veronika Haschka and Michaela Meissinger (AUT) |
| 25. | Marieke Veldhuizen and Anouk Zinger (NED) |
| 25. | Marit Erlandsen and Gro Kateraas (NOR) |
| 25. | Dominika Lesniewicz and Irabela Rutkowska (POL) |
| 25. | Irina Pantioukhova and Yulia Stepanova (RUS) |
