= 2002 European Beach Volleyball Championships =

International beach volleyball competition

The 2002 European Beach Volleyball Championships were held from August 29 to September 1, 2002 in Basel, Switzerland. It was the tenth official edition of the men's event, which started in 1993, while the women competed for the ninth time.

== Men's competition ==
- A total number of 23 participating couples

RANK	FINAL RANKING
1st place, gold medalist(s)	Markus Dieckmann and Jonas Reckermann (GER)
2nd place, silver medalist(s)	Martin Laciga and Paul Laciga (SUI)
3rd place, bronze medalist(s)	Vegard Høidalen and Jørre Kjemperud (NOR)
4.	Clemens Doppler and Nikolas Berger (AUT)
5.	Patrick Heuscher and Stefan Kobel (SUI)
5.	Peter Gartmayer and Robert Nowotny (AUT)
7.	Markus Egger and Sascha Heyer (SUI)
7.	Janis Grinbergs and Andris Krumins (LAT)
9.	Iver Horrem and Bjørn Maaseide (NOR)
9.	Dmitry Karasev and Pavel Zaytsev (RUS)
9.	Fabio Diez and Juan Garcia Thompson (ESP)
9.	Max Backer and Gijs Ronnes (NED)
13.	Björn Berg and Simon Dahl (SWE)
13.	Maurizio Pimponi and Andrea Raffaelli (ITA)
13.	Stéphane Canet and Mathieu Hamel (FRA)
13.	Jörg Ahmann and Axel Hager (GER)
17.	Guilherm Deulofeu and Ogier Molinier (FRA)
17.	Richard Kogel and Sander Mulder (NED)
17.	Javier Bosma and Antonio Cotrino (ESP)
17.	Mikhail Kouchnerev and Sergey Sayfulin (RUS)
17.	Pavlos Beligratis and Thanassis Michalopoulos (GRE)
17.	José Pedrosa and Nelson Brizida (POR)
17.	Kristjan Kais and Rivo Vesik (EST)

== Women's competition ==
- A total number of 24 participating couples

RANK	FINAL RANKING
1st place, gold medalist(s)	Daniela Gattelli and Lucilla Perrotta (ITA)
2nd place, silver medalist(s)	Rebekka Kadijk and Marrit Leenstra (NED)
3rd place, bronze medalist(s)	Eva Celbová and Sona Novaková (CZE)
4.	Lina Yanchulova and Petia Yanchulova (BUL)
5.	Simone Kuhn and Nicole Schnyder-Benoit (SUI)
5.	Susanne Glesnes and Kathrine Maaseide (NOR)
7.	Stephanie Pohl and Okka Rau (GER)
7.	Ester Alcón and Cati Pol (ESP)
9.	Laura Bruschini and Annamaria Solazzi (ITA)
9.	Marika Teknedzjanová and Tereza Tobiasová (CZE)
9.	Krisztina Nagy and Katalin Schlegl (HUN)
9.	Andrea Ahmann and Jana Vollmer (GER)
13.	Vasso Karadassiou and Efi Sfyri (GRE)
13.	Annika Granström and Angelica Ljungquist (SWE)
13.	Nila Håkedal and Ingrid Tørlen (NOR)
13.	Inguna Minusa and Inga Pulina (LAT)
17.	Mari-Liis Graumann and Anna-Liisa Sutt (EST)
17.	Liesbet Van Breedam and Kristien Van Lierop (BEL)
17.	Sara Montagnolli and Regine Silberberger (AUT)
17.	Ethel-Julie Arjona and Virginie Kadjo (FRA)
17.	Sylvia Gintzburger and Annik Skrivan (SUI)
17.	Efthalia Koutroumanidou and Katerina Nikolaidou (GRE)
17.	Christine Mellitzer and Sabine Swoboda (AUT)
17.	Andrea Luge and Audrey Syren (FRA)
