= Gattelli =

Gattelli is an Italian surname. Notable people with the surname include:

- Christopher Gattelli, American choreographer, performer, and theatre director
- Daniela Gattelli (born 1975), Italian beach volleyball player
