= Vesti =

Vesti may refer to:

== Media ==
- Vesti (German newspaper), a Serbian-language newspaper in Germany
- Vesti (Israeli newspaper), a Russian-language newspaper in Israel
- Vesti (TV channel), the former name of the news channel Russia-24
- Vesti (Ukrainian newspaper), a Russian-language newspaper in Ukraine, see freedom of the press in Ukraine
- Vesti (VGTRK), the news programmes on Russia-1 television
- Vesti FM, a Russian news radio station

== People with the surname ==
- Bernhard Vesti, Swiss beach volleyball player; see 1999 European Beach Volleyball Championships
- Frederik Vesti (born 2002), Danish racing driver
- Walter Vesti (born 1950), Swiss alpine skier
