= Audrey Syren =

French volleyball player (born 1983)

Personal information
- Nationality: French
- Born: 4 September 1983 (age 43); Mulhouse

Volleyball information
- Position: setter
- Number: 6 (national team)

Career
Years	Teams
2005	(France) RC Villebon 91

National team
2005	France

Audrey Syren (born 4 September 1983) in Mulhouse is a retired French female volleyball and beach volleyball player, playing as a setter. She was part of the France women's national volleyball team.

She competed at the 2005 Mediterranean Games. On club level she played for RC Villebon 91 in 2005.

As a beach volleyball player she played together with Andrea Luge. They competed at the 2001 European Beach Volleyball Championships and 2002 European Beach Volleyball Championships.
