= Andrea Ghiurghi =

Italian beach volleyball player

Personal information
- Nationality: Italian
- Born: December 15, 1966 (age 59); Varese, Italy
- Height: 199 cm (6 ft 6 in)
Honours
Men's beach volleyball
Representing Italy
European Championships
Bronze medal – third place	1993 Almería	Beach
Bronze medal – third place	1996 Pescara	Beach

Andrea Ghiurghi (born December 15, 1966) is an Italian retired male beach volleyball player who competed at the 1996 Summer Olympics in Atlanta for Italy. In 1993, he won the bronze medal at the first official European Championships in men's beach volleyball, partnering Dio Lequaglie. In 1996, with Nicola Grigolo, he won another bronze medal at the European Championships Master in Pescara. His best international finishes are three second places in the FIVB World Tour in 1991, 1996, and 2005 with partners Dio Lequaglie, Nicola Grigolo, and Gianni Mascagna, respectively. At the national level, he won eight national titles: in 1985, 1986, 1989, 1991, 1992, 1993, 1994, and 2003.

== Personal life ==
During Ghiurgi's career, for several years he carried out a peculiar "double life" playing professional beach volleyball and working as a biologist in Africa. At present he works as a freelance consultant for several conservation projects in the African continent and in Europe.

== Playing partners ==
- Dio Lequaglie
- Nicola Grigolo
- Riccardo Lione
- Gianni Mascagna
- Massimo Penteriani
- Maurizio Pimponi
- Giorgio Pallotta
- Enrico Corsetti
- Marco Solustri
