= Beate Bühler =

German beach volleyball player (born 1964)

Personal information
- Nationality: German
- Born: 8 April 1964 (age 62); Stuttgart, Baden-Württemberg, West Germany
- Height: 5 ft 9 in (175 cm)
Honours
Women's beach volleyball
Representing Germany
European Championships
Gold medal – first place	1994 Almería	Beach
Silver medal – second place	1996 Pescara	Beach

Beate Bühler (born 8 April 1964 in Stuttgart, Baden-Württemberg) is a retired female volleyball player from Germany, who competed for West Germany at the 1984 Summer Olympics in Los Angeles, United States. There she ended up in sixth place with the national squad after a loss (0–3) in the last classification match (5th/6th place) against South Korea.

Bühler competed in the beach volleyball tournament at the 1996 Summer Olympics and, alongside Danja Müsch, she claimed the gold medal at the 1994 European Championships in Almería, Spain.
