= 1996 European Beach Volleyball Championships =

International beach volleyball competition

The 1996 European Beach Volleyball Championships were held in August, 1996 in Pescara, Italy. It was the fourth official edition of the men's event, which started in 1993, while the women competed for the third time.

== Men's competition ==
RANK	FINAL RANKING
1st place, gold medalist(s)	Michal Palinek and Marek Pakosta (CZE)
2nd place, silver medalist(s)	Jörg Ahmann and Axel Hager (GER)
3rd place, bronze medalist(s)	Andrea Ghiurghi and Nicola Grigolo (ITA)
4.	Sascha Heyer and Martin Walser (SUI)

== Women's competition ==
RANK	FINAL RANKING
1st place, gold medalist(s)	Eva Celbová and Sona Novaková (CZE)
2nd place, silver medalist(s)	Beate Bühler and Danja Müsch (GER)
3rd place, bronze medalist(s)	Laura Bruschini and Annamaria Solazzi (ITA)
4.	Camilla Funck and Pernille Jørgensen (DEN)
