= 2017 European Beach Volleyball Championships =

Beach volleyball competition in Latvia

The 2017 European Beach Volleyball Championship was held from August 16 to August 20, 2017 in Jurmala, Latvia. The draw consisted of 32 men's & 32 women's teams, with 100,000 EUR prize money per gender. A 2,800 stadium was purpose built on Majori beach, with near capacity for most games. EuroBeachVolley awarded as “Sports Event of the Year” from hand Raimonds Vējonis.

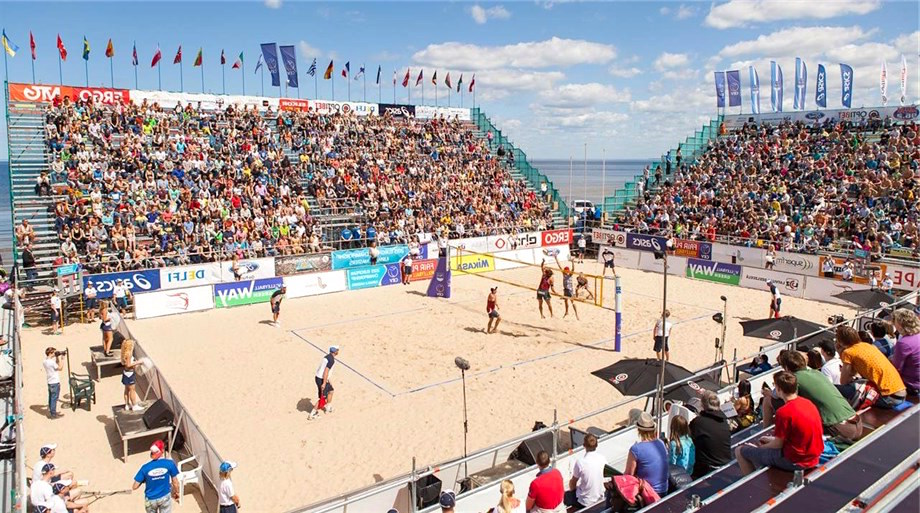
2017 European Beach Volleyball Championships

== Men's tournament ==
=== Preliminary round ===
==== Pool A ====
Pos	Team	Pld	W	L	Pts	SW	SL	SR	SPW	SPL	SPR	Qualification
1	(Italy) Ranghieri–Carambula	3	3	0	6	6	0	MAX	126	94	1.340	Round of 16
2	(Poland) Losiak–Kantor	3	2	1	5	4	3	1.333	126	119	1.059	Round of 24
3	(Latvia) Regza–Plavins	3	1	2	4	2	5	0.400	125	141	0.887	Round of 24
4	(Ukraine) Babich–Gordieiev	3	0	3	3	2	6	0.333	130	153	0.850	

Date	Time		Score		Set 1	Set 2	Set 3	Total	Report
16 Aug	12:30	Losiak - Kantor (Poland)	2–1	(Ukraine) Babich - Gordieiev	21–17	13–21	15–9	49–47	
16 Aug	12:30	Regza - Plavins (Latvia)	0–2	(Italy) Ranghieri - Carambula	18–21	15-21	-	33–42	
16 Aug	18:00	Losiak - Kantor (Poland)	0-2	(Italy) Ranghieri - Carambula	18–21	17–21	-	35-42	
16 Aug	18:00	Regza - Plavins (Latvia)	2–1	(Ukraine) Babich - Gordieiev	21–16	26–28	15–13	62-57	
17 Aug	14:00	Losiak - Kantor (Poland)	2–0	(Latvia) Regza - Plavins	21-17	21-13		42-30	
17 Aug	14:00	Ranghieri - Carambula (Italy)	2–0	(Ukraine) Babich - Gordieiev	21–13	21–13		42–26	

==== Pool B ====
Pos	Team	Pld	W	L	Pts	SW	SL	SR	SPW	SPL	SPR	Qualification
1	(Italy) Lupo–Nicolai	3	3	0	6	6	1	6.000	145	126	1.151	Round of 16
2	(Poland) Prudel–Kujawiak	3	2	1	5	4	3	1.333	138	132	1.045	Round of 24
3	(Slovenia) Zemljak–Pokeršnik	3	1	2	4	3	4	0.750	136	140	0.971	Round of 24
4	(Norway) Berntsen–Solhaug	3	0	3	3	1	6	0.167	132	153	0.863	

Date	Time		Score		Set 1	Set 2	Set 3	Total	Report
16 Aug	09:00	Lupo - Nicolai (Italy)	2–0	(Slovenia) Zemljak - Pokeršnik	25–23	21–19		46–42	
16 Aug	09:00	Prudel - Kujawiak (Poland)	2–0	(Norway) Berntsen - Solhaug	21–13	30–28		51–47	
16 Aug	16:00	Lupo - Nicolai (Italy)	2–1	(Norway) Berntsen - Solhaug	24–19	18–21	15-7	57–47	
16 Aug	16:00	Prudel - Kujawiak (Poland)	2–1	(Slovenia) Zemljak - Pokeršnik	21–19	17–21	15–9	53-49	
17 Aug	12:20	Lupo - Nicolai (Italy)	2–0	(Poland) Prudel - Kujawiak	21–15	21–19		42–34	
17 Aug	12:20	Berntsen - Solhaug (Norway)	0–2	(Slovenia) Zemljak - Pokeršnik	22–24	19–21		41–45	

==== Pool C ====
Pos	Team	Pld	W	L	Pts	SW	SL	SR	SPW	SPL	SPR	Qualification
1	(Russia) Liamin–Krasilnikov	3	3	0	6	6	0	MAX	126	83	1.518	Round of 16
2	(Germany) Schümann–Thole	3	2	1	5	4	3	1.333	133	129	1.031	Round of 24
3	(England) Gregory–Sheaf	3	1	2	4	2	4	0.500	110	116	0.948	Round of 24
4	(Germany) Erdmann–Dollinger	3	0	3	3	1	6	0.167	109	150	0.727	

Date	Time		Score		Set 1	Set 2	Set 3	Total	Report
16 Aug	09:50	Liamin - Krasilnikov (Russia)	2–0	(England) Gregory - Sheaf	21–13	21–16		42–29	
16 Aug	09:50	Schümann - Thole (Germany)	2–1	(Germany) Erdmann - Dollinger	27–25	18–21	15-8	60–54	
16 Aug	17:00	Liamin - Krasilnikov (Russia)	2–0	(Germany) Erdmann - Dollinger	21–11	21–12		42-23	
16 Aug	17:00	Schümann - Thole (Germany)	2–0	(England) Gregory - Sheaf	21–17	21-16		42-35	
17 Aug	13:10	Liamin - Krasilnikov (Russia)	2–0	(Germany) Schümann - Thole	21–18	21–13		42–31	
17 Aug	13:10	Gregory - Sheaf (England)	2–0	(Germany) Erdmann - Dollinger	21–7	27–25		48–32	

==== Pool D ====
Pos	Team	Pld	W	L	Pts	SW	SL	SR	SPW	SPL	SPR	Qualification
1	(Latvia) Samoilovs–Smedins	3	3	0	6	6	1	6.000	138	111	1.243	Round of 16
2	(Switzerland) Beeler–Krattiger	3	2	1	5	4	3	1.333	128	110	1.164	Round of 24
3	(Germany) Böckermann–Harms	3	1	2	4	3	4	0.750	115	130	0.885	Round of 24
4	(Turkey) Giginoglu–Mermer	3	0	3	3	1	6	0.167	109	139	0.784	

Date	Time		Score		Set 1	Set 2	Set 3	Total	Report
16 Aug	13:20	Samoilovs - Smedins (Latvia)	2–0	(Turkey) Giginoglu - Mermer	21–18	21–10		42–28	
16 Aug	13:20	Beeler - Krattiger (Switzerland)	2–0	(Germany) Böckermann - Harms	21–11	21–10		42–21	
16 Aug	19:00	Samoilovs - Smedins (Latvia)	2–0	(Germany) Böckermann - Harms	18–21	21–18	15-13	54–52	
16 Aug	19:00	Beeler - Krattiger (Switzerland)	2–1	(Turkey) Giginoglu - Mermer	19–21	21–16	15-10	55–47	
17 Aug	15:00	Samoilovs - Smedins (Latvia)	2–0	(Switzerland) Beeler - Krattiger	21–18	21–13		42–31	
17 Aug	15:00	Böckermann - Harms (Germany)	2–0	(Turkey) Giginoglu - Mermer	21–19	21–15		42–34	

==== Pool E ====
Pos	Team	Pld	W	L	Pts	SW	SL	SR	SPW	SPL	SPR	Qualification
1	(Poland) Fijalek–Bryl	3	3	0	6	6	1	6.000	141	109	1.294	Round of 16
2	(Poland) Rudol–Szalankiewicz	3	2	1	5	5	3	1.667	145	144	1.007	Round of 24
3	(Austria) Kunert–Dressler	3	1	2	4	3	5	0.600	130	144	0.903	Round of 24
4	(Finland) Piippo–Nurminen	3	0	3	3	1	6	0.167	121	140	0.864	

Date	Time		Score		Set 1	Set 2	Set 3	Total	Report
16 Aug	12:30	Kunert - Dressler (Austria)	2–1	(Finland) Piippo - Nurminen	23–21	16–21	15–10	54–52	
16 Aug	12:30	Fijalek - Bryl (Poland)	2–1	(Poland) Rudol - Szalankiewicz	21–19	21–23	15-9	57–51	
16 Aug	18:00	Rudol - Szalankiewicz (Poland)	2–1	(Austria) Kunert - Dressler	14–21	21–16	15-13	50–50	
16 Aug	18:00	Fijalek - Bryl (Poland)	2–0	(Finland) Piippo - Nurminen	21–18	21–14		42–32	
17 Aug	14:00	Rudol - Szalankiewicz (Poland)	2–0	(Finland) Piippo - Nurminen	21–16	23–21		44–37	
17 Aug	14:00	Fijalek - Bryl (Poland)	2–0	(Austria) Kunert - Dressler	21–15	21–11		42–26	

==== Pool F ====
Pos	Team	Pld	W	L	Pts	SW	SL	SR	SPW	SPL	SPR	Qualification
1	(Netherlands) Brouwer–Meeuwsen	6	6	0	12	6	1	6.000	137	114	1.202	Round of 16
2	(Belgium) Koekelkoren–van Walle	3	2	1	5	4	3	1.333	130	122	1.066	Round of 24
3	(Austria) Seidl Rob.–Winter	3	1	2	4	4	5	0.800	140	151	0.927	Round of 24
4	(Latvia) Solovejs–Smedins	3	0	3	3	1	6	0.167	111	131	0.847	

Date	Time		Score		Set 1	Set 2	Set 3	Total	Report
16 Aug	09:00	Brouwer - Meeuwsen (Netherlands)	2–0	(Latvia) Solovejs - Smedins	21–16	21–14		42–30	
16 Aug	09:00	Koekelkoren - van Walle (Belgium)	2–1	(Austria) Seidl Rob. - Winter	19–21	21–13	15–11	55–45	
16 Aug	16:00	Brouwer - Meeuwsen (Netherlands)	2–1	(Austria) Seidl Rob. - Winter	17–21	21–14	15-13	53–48	
16 Aug	16:00	Koekelkoren - van Walle (Belgium)	2–0	(Latvia) Solovejs - Smedins	21–18	21–17		42–35	
17 Aug	12:20	Brouwer - Meeuwsen (Netherlands)	2–0	(Belgium) Koekelkoren - van Walle	21–17	21–16		42–33	
17 Aug	12:20	Seidl Rob. - Winter (Austria)	2–1	(Latvia) Solovejs - Smedins	11–21	21–15	15–7	47–43	

==== Pool G ====
Pos	Team	Pld	W	L	Pts	SW	SL	SR	SPW	SPL	SPR	Qualification
1	(Norway) Mol–Sørum	3	3	0	6	6	0	MAX	108	78	1.385	Round of 16
2	(Spain) Herrera–Gavira	3	2	1	5	5	2	2.500	120	70	1.714	Round of 24
3	(Latvia) Tocs–Finsters	3	1	2	4	2	4	0.500	91	84	1.083	Round of 24
4	(Austria) Ermacora–Pristauz	3	0	3	3	0	6	0.000	21	126	0.167	

Date	Time		Score		Set 1	Set 2	Set 3	Total	Report
16 Aug	09:50	Herrera - Gavira (Spain)	2–0	(Latvia) Tocs - Finsters	21–10	21–18		42–28	
16 Aug	09:50	Mol - Sørum (Norway)	–	(Austria) Ermacora - Pristauz	Injury	–		–	
16 Aug	17:00	Herrera - Gavira (Spain)	–	(Austria) Ermacora - Pristauz	Injury	–		–	
16 Aug	17:00	Mol - Sørum (Norway)	2–0	(Latvia) Tocs - Finsters	21–13	21–8		42–21	
17 Aug	13:10	Herrera - Gavira (Spain)	0–2	(Norway) Mol - Sørum	19–21	17–21		36–42	
17 Aug	13:10	Ermacora - Pristauz (Austria)	–	(Latvia) Tocs - Finsters	Injury	–		–	

==== Pool H ====
Pos	Team	Pld	W	L	Pts	SW	SL	SR	SPW	SPL	SPR	Qualification
1	(Russia) Stoyanovskiy–Yarzutkin	3	2	1	5	4	3	1.333	133	120	1.108	Round of 16
2	(Germany) Walkenhorst–Fuchs	3	2	1	5	5	3	1.667	145	139	1.043	Round of 24
3	(France) Thiercy–Di Giantommaso	3	1	2	4	4	4	1.000	138	143	0.965	Round of 24
4	(Austria) Hörl–Horst	3	1	2	4	2	5	0.400	118	132	0.894	

Date	Time		Score		Set 1	Set 2	Set 3	Total	Report
16 Aug	13:20	Stoyanovskiy - Yarzutkin (Russia)	2–1	(Germany) Walkenhorst - Fuchs	21–17	19–21	15–9	55–47	
16 Aug	13:20	Hörl - Horst (Austria)	2–1	(France) Thiercy - Di Giantommaso	21–19	15–21	15–8	51–48	
16 Aug	19:00	Stoyanovskiy - Yarzutkin (Russia)	0–2	(France) Thiercy - Di Giantommaso	17–21	19–21		36–42	
16 Aug	19:00	Hörl - Horst (Austria)	0–2	(Germany) Walkenhorst - Fuchs	19–21	17–21		36–42	
17 Aug	15:00	Stoyanovskiy - Yarzutkin (Russia)	2–0	(Austria) Hörl - Horst	21–17	21–14		42–31	
17 Aug	15:00	Thiercy - Di Giantommaso (France)	1–2	(Germany) Walkenhorst - Fuchs	20–22	21–19	7–15	48–56	

=== Knockout stage ===
A draw was held to determine the pairings.

==== Round of 24 ====
Date	Time		Score		Set 1	Set 2	Set 3	Total	Report
18 Aug	09:00	Schümann - Thole (Germany)	2–1	(Slovenia) Zemljak - Pokeršnik	21–17	24–26	15–12	60–55	
18 Aug	09:00	Koekelkoren - van Walle (Belgium)	2–0	(Germany) Böckermann - Harms	21–19	21–16		42–35	
18 Aug	09:00	Beeler - Krattiger (Switzerland)	2–1	(Latvia) Tocs - Finsters	20–22	21–12	15–13	56–47	
18 Aug	09:00	Losiak - Kantor (Poland)	2–0	(Austria) Kunert - Dressler	21–17	21–15		42–32	
18 Aug	10:00	Rudol - Szalankiewicz (Poland)	0–2	(Latvia) Regza - Plavins	20–22	17–21		37–43	
18 Aug	10:00	Walkenhorst - Fuchs (Germany)	2–0	(England) Gregory - Sheaf	25–23	21–17		46–40	
18 Aug	10:00	Prudel - Kujawiak (Poland)	1–2	(France) Thiercy - Di Giantommaso	19–21	21–12	9–15	49–42	
18 Aug	10:00	Herrera - Gavira (Spain)	0–2	(Austria) Seidl Rob. - Winter	21–23	17–21		38–44	

==== Round of 16 ====
Date	Time		Score		Set 1	Set 2	Set 3	Total	Report
18 Aug	13:00	Ranghieri - Carambula (Italy)	2–0	(Germany) Schümann - Thole	21–18	21–19		42–37	
18 Aug	13:00	Stoyanovskiy - Yarzutkin (Russia)	0–2	(Belgium) Koekelkoren - van Walle	18–21	18–21		36–42	
18 Aug	13:00	Fijalek - Bryl (Poland)	2–0	(Switzerland) Beeler - Krattiger	21–18	21–16		42–34	
18 Aug	13:00	Samoilovs - Smedins (Latvia)	2–1	(Poland) Losiak - Kantor	21–19	19–21	15–10	55–50	
18 Aug	14:00	Liamin - Krasilnikov (Russia)	1–2	(Latvia) Regza - Plavins	21–19	16–21	10–15	47–55	
18 Aug	14:00	Brouwer - Meeuwsen (Netherlands)	–	(Germany) Walkenhorst - Fuchs	Injury				
18 Aug	14:00	Mol - Sørum (Norway)	2–0	(France) Thiercy - Di Giantommaso	21–19	21–12		42–31	
18 Aug	14:00	Lupo - Nicolai (Italy)	2–0	(Austria) Seidl Rob. - Winter	21–17	21–17		42–34	

==== Quarterfinals ====
Date	Time		Score		Set 1	Set 2	Set 3	Total	Report
18 Aug	17:00	Ranghieri - Carambula (Italy)	1–2	(Belgium) Koekelkoren - van Walle	21–18	15–21	15-17	51–56	
18 Aug	18:00	Fijalek - Bryl (Poland)	0–2	(Latvia) Samoilovs - Smedins	14–21	17–21		31–42	
19 Aug	13:00	Regza - Plavins (Latvia)	0–2	(Netherlands) Brouwer - Meeuwsen	19–21	19–21		38–42	
19 Aug	14:00	Mol - Sørum (Norway)	0–2	(Italy) Lupo - Nicolai	15–21	17–21		32–42	

==== Semifinals ====
Date	Time		Score		Set 1	Set 2	Set 3	Total	Report
19 Aug	17:00	Koekelkoren - van Walle (Belgium)	1–2	(Latvia) Samoilovs - Smedins	14–21	21–15	12–15	47–51	
19 Aug	18:00	Brouwer - Meeuwsen (Netherlands)	1–2	(Italy) Lupo - Nicolai	25–23	15–21	11-15	51–59	

==== Third place game ====
Date	Time		Score		Set 1	Set 2	Set 3	Total	Report
20 Aug	14:00	Koekelkoren - van Walle (Belgium)	1–2	(Netherlands) Brouwer - Meeuwsen	17–21	21–17	11–15	49–53	

==== Final ====
Date	Time		Score		Set 1	Set 2	Set 3	Total	Report
20 Aug	17:30	Samoilovs - Smedins (Latvia)	0–2	(Italy) Lupo - Nicolai	16–21	21–23		37–44	

== Women's tournament ==
=== Preliminary round ===
==== Pool A ====
Pos	Team	Pld	W	L	Pts	SW	SL	SR	SPW	SPL	SPR	Qualification
1	(Germany) Laboureur–Sude	3	3	0	6	6	0	MAX	126	75	1.680	Round of 16
2	(Spain) Elsa–Soria	3	2	1	5	4	2	2.000	110	92	1.196	Round of 24
3	(Netherlands) Driessen–Meertens	3	1	2	4	2	4	0.500	85	122	0.697	Round of 24
4	(Finland) Sinisalo–Ahtiainen	3	0	3	3	0	6	0.000	95	127	0.748	

Date	Time		Score		Set 1	Set 2	Set 3	Total	Report
16 Aug	10:40	Laboureur - Sude (Germany)	2–0	(Netherlands) Driessen - Meertens	21–13	21–7		42–20	
16 Aug	10:40	Sinisalo - Ahtiainen (Finland)	0–2	(Spain) Elsa - Soria	15–21	13–21		28–42	
17 Aug	09:00	Laboureur - Sude (Germany)	2–0	(Spain) Elsa - Soria	21–9	21–17		42–26	
17 Aug	09:00	Sinisalo - Ahtiainen (Finland)	0–2	(Netherlands) Driessen - Meertens	20–22	18–21		38–43	
17 Aug	16:00	Laboureur - Sude (Germany)	2–0	(Finland) Sinisalo - Ahtiainen	21–14	21–15		42–29	
17 Aug	16:00	Elsa - Soria (Spain)	2–0	(Netherlands) Driessen - Meertens	21–11	21–11		42–22	

==== Pool B ====
Pos	Team	Pld	W	L	Pts	SW	SL	SR	SPW	SPL	SPR	Qualification
1	(Germany) Borger–Kozuch	3	3	0	6	6	1	6.000	143	125	1.144	Round of 16
2	(Netherlands) Meppelink–van Gestel	3	2	1	5	5	2	2.500	142	116	1.224	Round of 24
3	(Ukraine) Makhno, In.–Makhno, Ir.	3	1	2	4	2	4	0.500	111	125	0.888	Round of 24
4	(Finland) Tuominen–Lehtonen	3	0	3	3	0	6	0.000	100	130	0.769	

Date	Time		Score		Set 1	Set 2	Set 3	Total	Report
16 Aug	11:30	Borger - Kozuch (Germany)	2–0	(Ukraine) Makhno, In. - Makhno, Ir.	22–20	21–16		43–36	
16 Aug	11:30	Meppelink - van Gestel (Netherlands)	2–0	(Finland) Tuominen - Lehtonen	21–17	21–12		42–19	
17 Aug	09:50	Borger - Kozuch (Germany)	2–0	(Finland) Tuominen - Lehtonen	21–14	21–17		42–31	
17 Aug	09:50	Meppelink - van Gestel (Netherlands)	2–0	(Ukraine) Makhno, In. - Makhno, Ir.	21–15	21–14		42–29	
17 Aug	17:00	Borger - Kozuch (Germany)	2–1	(Netherlands) Meppelink - van Gestel	21–18	16–21	21–19	58–58	
17 Aug	17:00	Tuominen - Lehtonen (Finland)	0–2	(Ukraine) Makhno, In. - Makhno, Ir.	23–25	17–21		40–46	

==== Pool C ====
Pos	Team	Pld	W	L	Pts	SW	SL	SR	SPW	SPL	SPR	Qualification
1	(Switzerland) Heidrich–Vergé-Dépré A	3	3	0	6	6	2	3.000	153	132	1.159	Round of 16
2	(Netherlands) Sinnema–Stubbe	3	1	2	4	4	4	1.000	144	135	1.067	Round of 24
3	(Russia) Abalakina–Dabizha	3	1	2	4	2	4	0.500	113	120	0.942	Round of 24
4	(Norway) Kjølberg–Hjortland	3	1	2	4	3	5	0.600	125	148	0.845	

Date	Time		Score		Set 1	Set 2	Set 3	Total	Report
16 Aug	14:10	Heidrich - Vergé-Dépré A (Switzerland)	2–0	(Russia) Abalakina - Dabizha	25–23	21–17		46–40	
16 Aug	14:10	Sinnema - Stubbe (Netherlands)	1–2	(Norway) Kjølberg - Hjortland	21–10	17–21	16–18	54–42	
17 Aug	10:40	Heidrich - Vergé-Dépré A (Switzerland)	2–1	(Norway) Kjølberg - Hjortland	16–21	21–16	15–7	52–44	
17 Aug	10:40	Sinnema - Stubbe (Netherlands)	2–0	(Russia) Abalakina - Dabizha	21–16	21–15		42–31	
17 Aug	18:00	Heidrich - Vergé-Dépré A (Switzerland)	2–1	(Netherlands) Sinnema - Stubbe	21–17	19–21	15–10	55–48	
17 Aug	18:00	Kjølberg - Hjortland (Norway)	0–2	(Russia) Abalakina - Dabizha	16–21	16–21		32–42	

==== Pool D ====
Pos	Team	Pld	W	L	Pts	SW	SL	SR	SPW	SPL	SPR	Qualification
1	(Austria) Schwaiger S.–Schützenhöfer	3	3	0	6	6	1	6.000	143	122	1.172	Round of 16
2	(Switzerland) Betschart–Hüberli	3	2	1	5	4	2	2.000	115	93	1.237	Round of 24
3	(Lithuania) Dumbauskaite–Povilaityte	3	1	2	4	2	4	0.500	113	120	0.942	Round of 24
4	(Latvia) Lece–Ozolina	3	1	2	4	3	5	0.600	125	148	0.845	

Date	Time		Score		Set 1	Set 2	Set 3	Total	Report
16 Aug	14:10	Betschart - Hüberli (Switzerland)	2–0	(Latvia) Lece - Ozolina	21–10	21–12		42–22	
16 Aug	14:10	Schwaiger S. - Schützenhöfer (Austria)	2–1	(Lithuania) Dumbauskaite - Povilaityte	19–21	21–19	16–14	55–50	
17 Aug	10:40	Betschart - Hüberli (Switzerland)	2–0	(Lithuania) Dumbauskaite - Povilaityte	21–12	21–17		42–27	
17 Aug	10:40	Schwaiger S. - Schützenhöfer (Austria)	2–0	(Latvia) Lece - Ozolina	21–15	24–22		45–37	
17 Aug	18:00	Betschart - Hüberli (Switzerland)	0–2	(Austria) Schwaiger S. - Schützenhöfer	17–21	14–21		31–42	
17 Aug	18:00	Dumbauskaite - Povilaityte (Lithuania)	2–0	(Latvia) Lece - Ozolina	23–21	21–15		44–36	

==== Pool E ====
Pos	Team	Pld	W	L	Pts	SW	SL	SR	SPW	SPL	SPR	Qualification
1	(Czech Republic) Kolocova–Kvapilova	3	2	1	5	4	2	2.000	118	94	1.255	Round of 16
2	(Russia) Birlova–Makroguzova	3	2	1	5	5	2	2.500	133	118	1.127	Round of 24
3	(Norway) Lunde–Ulveseth	3	2	1	5	4	4	1.000	128	143	0.895	Round of 24
4	(Latvia) Caica–Liepinlauska	3	0	3	3	1	6	0.167	112	136	0.824	

Date	Time		Score		Set 1	Set 2	Set 3	Total	Report
16 Aug	11:30	Kolocova - Kvapilova (Czech Republic)	2–0	(Latvia) Caica - Liepinlauska	21–15	21–14		42–29	
16 Aug	11:30	Birlova - Makroguzova (Russia)	1–2	(Norway) Lunde - Ulveseth	21–17	15–21	13-15	49–53	
17 Aug	09:50	Kolocova - Kvapilova (Czech Republic)	2–0	(Norway) Lunde - Ulveseth	21–13	21–10		42–23	
17 Aug	09:50	Birlova - Makroguzova (Russia)	2–0	(Latvia) Caica - Liepinlauska	21–12	21–19		42–31	
17 Aug	17:00	Kolocova - Kvapilova (Czech Republic)	0–2	(Russia) Birlova - Makroguzova	15–21	19–21		34–42	
17 Aug	17:00	Lunde - Ulveseth (Norway)	2–1	(Latvia) Caica - Liepinlauska	21–19	16–21	15–12	52–52	

==== Pool F ====
Pos	Team	Pld	W	L	Pts	SW	SL	SR	SPW	SPL	SPR	Qualification
1	(Russia) Moiseeva–Syrtseva	3	2	1	5	5	3	1.667	155	144	1.076	Round of 16
2	(Germany) Bieneck–Schneider	3	2	1	5	5	3	1.667	151	143	1.056	Round of 24
3	(Ukraine) Davidova–Shchypkova	3	2	1	5	5	4	1.250	150	156	0.962	Round of 24
4	(Latvia) Jursone–Auzina (Olte)	3	0	3	3	1	6	0.167	122	135	0.904	

Date	Time		Score		Set 1	Set 2	Set 3	Total	Report
29 Jul	14:00	Bieneck - Schneider (Germany)	2–0	(Latvia) Jursone - Auzina (Olte)	21–14	21–19		42–33	
29 Jul	14:00	Davidova - Shchypkova (Ukraine)	1–2	(Russia) Moiseeva - Syrtseva	21–18	14–21	13-15	49–54	
30 Jul	14:00	Bieneck - Schneider (Germany)	2–1	(Russia) Moiseeva - Syrtseva	25–27	21–19	15-12	61–58	
30 Jul	14:00	Davidova - Shchypkova (Ukraine)	2–1	(Latvia) Jursone - Auzina (Olte)	21–19	13–21	16-14	50–54	
31 Jul	11:00	Bieneck - Schneider (Germany)	1–2	(Ukraine) Davidova - Shchypkova	17–21	21–16	10–15	48–52	
31 Jul	11:00	Moiseeva - Syrtseva (Russia)	2–0	(Latvia) Jursone - Auzina (Olte)	21–15	22–20		43–35	

==== Pool G ====
Pos	Team	Pld	W	L	Pts	SW	SL	SR	SPW	SPL	SPR	Qualification
1	(Germany) Ludwig–Walkenhorst	3	3	0	6	6	2	3.000	149	138	1.080	Round of 16
2	(Finland) Lahti–Parkkinen	3	2	1	5	5	3	1.667	151	146	1.034	Round of 24
3	(Russia) Motrich–Kholomina	3	1	2	4	3	4	0.750	131	130	1.008	Round of 24
4	(France) Jupiter–Lusson	3	0	3	3	1	6	0.167	118	135	0.874	

Date	Time		Score		Set 1	Set 2	Set 3	Total	Report
29 Jul	17:00	Ludwig - Walkenhorst (Germany)	2–0	(France) Jupiter - Lusson	21–18	21–18		42–36	
29 Jul	17:00	Lahti - Parkkinen (Finland)	2–0	(Russia) Motrich - Kholomina	25–23	21–18		46–41	
30 Jul	15:00	Ludwig - Walkenhorst (Germany)	2–1	(Russia) Motrich - Kholomina	21–18	14–21	15-9	60–48	
30 Jul	15:00	Lahti - Parkkinen (Finland)	2–1	(France) Jupiter - Lusson	21–17	15–21	15–10	51–48	
31 Jul	12:00	Ludwig - Walkenhorst (Germany)	2–1	(Finland) Lahti - Parkkinen	23–21	19–21	15-12	57–54	
31 Jul	12:00	Motrich - Kholomina (Russia)	2–0	(France) Jupiter - Lusson	21–18	21–16		42–34	

==== Pool H ====
Pos	Team	Pld	W	L	Pts	SW	SL	SR	SPW	SPL	SPR	Qualification
1	(Latvia) Graudina–Kravcenoka	3	3	0	6	6	0	MAX	129	106	1.217	Round of 16
2	(Poland) Kolosinska–Gruszczynska	3	2	1	5	4	2	2.000	122	97	1.258	Round of 24
3	(Germany) Glenzke–Großner	3	1	2	4	2	5	0.400	125	139	0.899	Round of 24
4	(Austria) Plesiutschnig–Strauss	3	0	3	3	1	6	0.167	106	140	0.757	

Date	Time		Score		Set 1	Set 2	Set 3	Total	Report
29 Jul	16:00	Graudina - Kravcenoka (Latvia)	2–0	(Austria) Plesiutschnig - Strauss	21–13	21–17		42–30	
29 Jul	16:00	Glenzke - Großner (Germany)	0–2	(Poland) Kolosinska - Gruszczynska	16–21	15–21		31–42	
30 Jul	14:00	Graudina - Kravcenoka (Latvia)	2–0	(Poland) Kolosinska - Gruszczynska	21–19	21–19		42–38	
30 Jul	14:00	Glenzke - Großner (Germany)	2–1	(Austria) Plesiutschnig - Strauss	18–21	23–21	15–10	55–52	
31 Jul	12:00	Graudina - Kravcenoka (Latvia)	2–0	(Germany) Glenzke - Großner	21–16	24–22		45–38	
31 Jul	12:00	Kolosinska - Gruszczynska (Poland)	2–0	(Austria) Plesiutschnig - Strauss	21–9	21–15		42–24	

=== Knockout stage ===
A draw was held to determine the pairings.

==== Round of 24 ====
Date	Time		Score		Set 1	Set 2	Set 3	Total	Report
18 Aug	11:00	Bieneck - Schneider (Germany)	0–2	(Germany) Glenzke - Großner	22–24	16–21		38–35	
18 Aug	11:00	Sinnema - Stubbe (Netherlands)	2–0	(Ukraine) Davidova - Shchypkova	21–19	21–13		42–32	
18 Aug	11:00	Kolosinska - Gruszczynska (Poland)	2–0	(Netherlands) Driessen - Meertens	21–6	21–17		42–23	
18 Aug	11:00	Birlova - Makroguzova (Russia)	2–0	(Lithuania) Dumbauskaite - Povilaityte	21–14	24–22		45–36	
18 Aug	12:00	Lahti - Parkkinen (Finland)	2–0	(Norway) Lunde - Ulveseth	21–12	24–22		45–34	
18 Aug	12:00	Bieneck - Schneider (Germany)	2–0	(Russia) Abalakina - Dabizha	21–12	21–15		42–27	
18 Aug	12:00	Elsa - Soria (Spain)	2–0	(Ukraine) Makhno, In. - Makhno, Ir.	21–17	21–19		42–36	
18 Aug	12:00	Meppelink - van Gestel (Netherlands)	2–0	(Russia) Motrich - Kholomina	21–19	21–18		42–37	

==== Round of 16 ====
Date	Time		Score		Set 1	Set 2	Set 3	Total	Report
18 Aug	15:00	Borger - Kozuch (Germany)	1–2	(Germany) Glenzke - Großner	23–21	15–21	15–17	53–59	
18 Aug	15:00	Ludwig - Walkenhorst (Germany)	2–0	(Netherlands) Sinnema - Stubbe	22–20	21–15		43–35	
18 Aug	15:00	Moiseeva - Syrtseva (Russia)	0–2	(Poland) Kolosinska - Gruszczynska	17–21	19–21		36–42	
18 Aug	15:00	Heidrich - Vergé-Dépré A (Switzerland)	0–2	(Russia) Birlova - Makroguzova	24–26	15–21		39–47	
18 Aug	16:00	Schwaiger S. - Schützenhöfer (Austria)	0–2	(Finland) Lahti - Parkkinen	19–21	18–21		37–42	
18 Aug	16:00	Kolocova - Kvapilova (Czech Republic)	2–1	(Switzerland) Betschart - Hüberli	13–21	21–18	15–8	49–47	
18 Aug	16:00	Graudina - Kravcenoka (Latvia)	2–0	(Spain) Elsa - Soria	21–17	21–19		42–36	
18 Aug	16:00	Laboureur - Sude (Germany)	2–0	(Netherlands) Meppelink - van Gestel	21–12	21–17		42–29	

==== Quarterfinals ====
Date	Time		Score		Set 1	Set 2	Set 3	Total	Report
19 Aug	11:00	Ludwig - Walkenhorst (Germany)	1–2	(Germany) Glenzke - Großner	21–17	14–21	17–19	52–57	
19 Aug	12:00	Birlova - Makroguzova (Russia)	0–2	(Poland) Kolosinska - Gruszczynska	10–21	22–24		32–45	
19 Aug	15:00	Kolocova - Kvapilova (Czech Republic)	2–1	(Finland) Lahti - Parkkinen	21–18	18–21	15–12	54–51	
19 Aug	16:00	Laboureur - Sude (Germany)	2–0	(Latvia) Graudina - Kravcenoka	21–16	21–16		42–32	

==== Semifinals ====
Date	Time		Score		Set 1	Set 2	Set 3	Total	Report
20 Aug	11:00	Laboureur - Sude (Germany)	1–2	(Czech Republic) Kolocova - Kvapilova	17–21	21–15	11–15	49–51	
20 Aug	12:00	Kolosinska - Gruszczynska (Poland)	0–2	(Germany) Glenzke - Großner	13–21	19–21		32–42	

==== Third place game ====
Date	Time		Score		Set 1	Set 2	Set 3	Total	Report
20 Aug	15:00	Laboureur - Sude (Germany)	2–1	(Poland) Kolosinska - Gruszczynska	17–21	26–24	15–8	58–53	

==== Final ====
Date	Time		Score		Set 1	Set 2	Set 3	Total	Report
20 Aug	16:15	Kolocova - Kvapilova (Czech Republic)	1–2	(Germany) Glenzke - Großner	21–15	17–21	11–15	49–51	
