= Dio Lequaglie =

Italian beach volleyball player (born 1963)

Personal information
- Nationality: Italian
- Born: October 12, 1963 (age 63); Civitavecchia, Italy
- Height: 6 ft 1 in (185 cm)
Honours
Men's beach volleyball
Representing Italy
European Championships
Bronze medal – third place	1993 Almería	Beach
Bronze medal – third place	1995 Saint-Quay	Beach

Dio Lequaglie (born October 12, 1963 in Civitavecchia) is a retired beach volleyball player from Italy. In 1993 he won the bronze medal at the first official European Championships in men's beach volleyball, partnering with Andrea Ghiurghi.

== Playing partners ==
- Piero Antonini
- Giuseppe Bua
- Fosco Cicola
- Enrico Corsetti
- Giovanni Errichiello
- Andrea Ghiurghi
- Riccardo Lione
- Gianni Mascagna
- Maurizio Pimponi
- Marco Solustri
