= George Giatsis =

Greek volleyball and beach volleyball coach

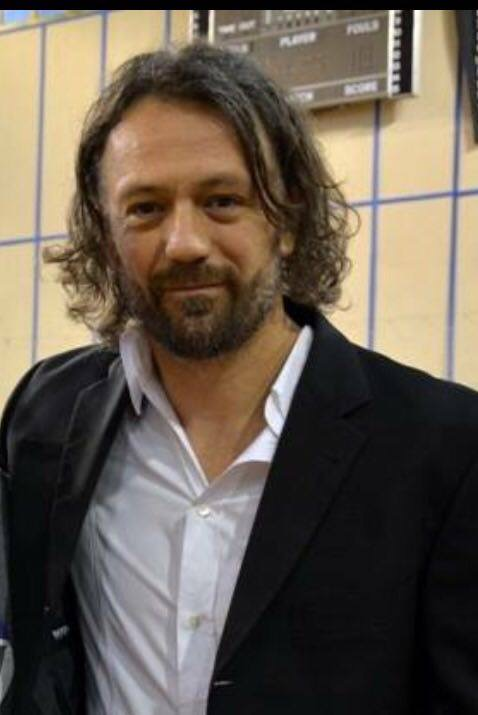

Professor Dr. George Giatsis (born 22 June 1968) is a Greek academic researcher and volleyball and beach volleyball coach (Aris, P.A.O.K., Lamia, Filathlitikos).

With a doctorate in the kinesiology of volleyball and beach volleyball, Giatsis is recognized for his expertise in biomechanical analysis. The title of his doctoral thesis is "Biomechanical differences in elite beach-volleyball players in vertical jumps on rigid and sand surfaces". His expertise extends to various aspects of kinesiology and performance in volleyball, beach volleyball, and vertical jumps. He is recognized as an expert in the kinesiology of the arm swing technique in spike attacks in both volleyball and beach volleyball.

Giatsis has contributed to the field with a number of scientific articles addressing kinesiology and performance in volleyball, beach volleyball, and vertical jumps. His research on arm swing techniques has led to the categorization of various styles, including bow and arrow low and high, circular limited and extended, and snap and straight.

Giatsis is an FIVB (Fédération Internationale de Volleyball) instructor in both volleyball and beach volleyball. In June 2024, Giatsis was honored by the Hellenic Volleyball Federation for his contributions as a coach and scientific researcher in volleyball and beach volleyball

During his career from 1991 to 2006, Giatsis won more than 70 national and international medals. This tally includes 34 medals in the Greek National Masters Beach Volleyball Championship, placing him among the top three athletes of all time in the competition's history. In 1998, he took ninth place in CEV finals at the European Championship in Rhodes. He also took 2nd place in Doha, Qatar in 2002.
