= Adriana Behar =

Brazilian beach volleyball player

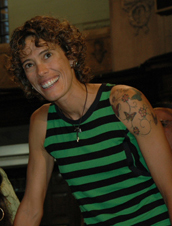
- Behar in 2005

Personal information
- Full name: Adriana Brandão Behar
- Born: 14 February 1969 (age 57); Rio de Janeiro, Brazil
- Height: 5 ft 11 in (1.80 m)
Honours
Women's beach volleyball
Representing Brazil
Olympic Games
| Silver medal – second place | 2000 Sydney | Beach |
| Silver medal – second place | 2004 Athens | Beach |
Pan American Games
| Gold medal – first place | 1999 Winnipeg | Beach |
World Championships
| Gold medal – first place | 1999 Marseille | Beach |
| Gold medal – first place | 2001 Klagenfurt | Beach |
| Silver medal – second place | 2003 Rio de Janeiro | Beach |
| Bronze medal – third place | 1997 Los Angeles | Beach |
Goodwill Games
| Gold medal – first place | 1998 New York | Beach |
| Silver medal – second place | 2001 Brisbane | Beach |

Adriana Brandão Behar (born 14 February 1969) is a Brazilian former volleyball player of Jewish descent. She was inducted into the Volleyball Hall of Fame in 2010.

== Sports career ==
Behar began her sports career as a figure skater at the age of 10 at Flamengo. At the age of 16, she switched to indoor volleyball, where she played professionally in Italy for three seasons.

In 1992, back in Brazil, Adriana dedicated herself to beach volleyball, starting a new phase in her sports career.

In 1995, after the suggestion of coach Letícia Pessoa, Adriana formed a duo with Shelda Bedê. This partnership lasted 12 seasons and became one of the most successful in the history of beach volleyball. Together, they won more than a thousand victories and 114 titles.

Adriana and Shelda won world championships in 1999 and 2001 and maintained their lead in the world rankings in 2000, 2001 and 2004.

At the 2000 Sydney Olympics, the pair reached the final after winning four matches, winning the silver medal.

They repeated the feat at the Athens 2004 Olympic Games, where they again took silver, becoming the first female pair to win more than one Olympic medal.

== Recognition ==
Throughout her career, Adriana was honored several times on the Brazilian Circuit, being recognized as best blocker (1998–2000) and best striker (1999)

In 2006, Adriana and Shelda were included in the Guinness Book of Records as the players with the most titles won on the World Circuit, totaling six.

She was indicted to the International Jewish Sports Hall of Fame in 2006.

She was inducted into the Volleyball Hall of Fame in 2010.

She was recognized as one of the BBC's 100 women of 2017.

She is first woman to assume the position of CEO of the Brazilian Volleyball Confederation in 2021.

== Post-retirement ==
After her retirement in 2008, Adriana Behar specialized in Business Management and took on administrative positions.

She engaged in the Banco do Brasil Sports Ambassadors project, participating in lectures, fairs and social actions.

In 2012, she became Brazil's sole representative on the Women's Commission of the International Olympic Committee and is currently president of the Women in Sport Commission of the Brazilian Olympic Committee.

In 2017, she was listed among the BBC's 100 Women.

== See also ==
- List of notable Jewish volleyball players

Sporting positions
| Preceded by Jackie Silva and Sandra Pires (BRA) | Women's FIVB Beach World Tour Winner alongside (Brazil) Shelda Bede; 1997–2001 | Succeeded by Kerri Walsh and Misty May-Treanor (USA) |
| Preceded by Sandra Pires and Ana Paula Connelly (BRA) | Women's FIVB Beach World Tour Winner alongside (Brazil) Shelda Bede; 2004 | Succeeded by Larissa França and Juliana Felisberta (BRA) |
