= Jean-Philippe Jodard =

French beach volleyball player (born 1966)

Personal information
- Nationality: French
- Born: July 8, 1966 (age 60); Auxerre, France
Honours
Men's beach volleyball
Representing France
European Championship
Gold medal – first place	1993 Almería	Beach

Jean-Philippe Jodard (born July 8, 1966 in Auxerre) is a retired male beach volleyball player from France, who competed in two consecutive Summer Olympics for his native country, starting in 1996. He became the first official European champion in men's beach volleyball, when he won the title in 1993 alongside Christian Penigaud.

== Playing partners ==
- Christian Penigaud
- Ivan Douenel
- Eric Bouvier
- Gregory Znatchkowsky
