= Christian Penigaud =

French beach volleyball player (born 1964)

Personal information
- Nationality: French
- Born: 27 February 1964 (age 62); Poitiers, France
Honours
Men's beach volleyball
Representing France
European Championship
Gold medal – first place	1993 Almería	Beach

Christian Penigaud (born 27 February 1964 in Poitiers) is a retired male beach volleyball player from France, who competed in two consecutive Summer Olympics for his native country, starting in 1996. He became the first official European champion in men's beach volleyball, when he won the title in 1993 alongside Jean-Philippe Jodard.

== Playing partners ==
- Jean-Philippe Jodard
- Thierry Glowacz
- Laurent Tillie
- Jean-Christian Gras
