= 1997 European Beach Volleyball Championships =

International beach volleyball competition

The 1997 European Beach Volleyball Championships were held in August 1997 in Rome, Italy. It was the fifth official edition of the men's event, which started in 1993, while the women competed for the fourth time.

== Men's competition ==
RANK	FINAL RANKING
1st place, gold medalist(s)	Vegard Høidalen and Jørre Kjemperud (NOR)
2nd place, silver medalist(s)	Jan Kvalheim and Bjørn Maaseide (NOR)
3rd place, bronze medalist(s)	Martin Laciga and Paul Laciga (SUI)

== Women's competition ==
RANK	FINAL RANKING
1st place, gold medalist(s)	Laura Bruschini and Annamaria Solazzi (ITA)
2nd place, silver medalist(s)	Daniela Gattelli and Lucilla Perrotta (ITA)
3rd place, bronze medalist(s)	Eva Celbová and Sona Novaková (CZE)
