= Shelda Bede =

Brazilian beach volleyball player (born 1973)

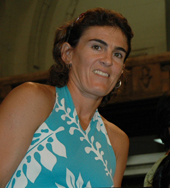
- Bede in 2005

Personal information
- Full name: Shelda Kelly Bruno Bede
- Born: 1 January 1973 (age 53); Fortaleza, Brazil
- Height: 5 ft 5 in (1.65 m)
Honours
Women's beach volleyball
Representing Brazil
Olympic Games
Silver medal – second place	2000 Sydney	Beach
Silver medal – second place	2004 Athens	Beach
Pan American Games
Gold medal – first place	1999 Winnipeg	Beach
World Championships
Gold medal – first place	1999 Marseille	Beach
Gold medal – first place	2001 Klagenfurt	Beach
Silver medal – second place	2003 Rio de Janeiro	Beach
Bronze medal – third place	1997 Los Angeles	Beach

Shelda Kelly Bruno Bede (born 1 January 1973) is a Brazilian retired beach volleyball player.

Bede was born in Fortaleza.

Bede won silver medals in beach volleyball at the 2000 Summer Olympics in Sydney and the 2004 Summer Olympics in Athens.

== Sponsors ==
- Swatch

Sporting positions
Preceded by Jackie Silva and Sandra Pires (BRA)	Women's FIVB Beach World Tour Winner alongside (Brazil) Adriana Behar; 1997–2001	Succeeded by Kerri Walsh and Misty May-Treanor (USA)
Preceded by Sandra Pires and Ana Paula Connelly (BRA)	Women's FIVB Beach World Tour Winner alongside (Brazil) Adriana Behar; 2004	Succeeded by Larissa França and Juliana Felisberta (BRA)
Preceded by Larissa França and Juliana Felisberta (BRA)	Women's FIVB Beach World Tour Winner alongside (Brazil) Ana Paula Connelly; 2008	Succeeded by Larissa França and Juliana Felisberta (BRA)
Awards
Preceded by Inaugural	Women's FIVB World Tour "Best Defender"; 2005–2006	Succeeded by Misty May-Treanor (USA)
Preceded by Inaugural	Women's FIVB World Tour "Most Inspirational"; 2005–2009	Succeeded by Denise Johns (GBR)
Preceded by Kerri Walsh (USA); Misty May-Treanor (USA)	Women's FIVB World Tour "Sportsperson"; 2009	Succeeded by Misty May-Treanor (USA)
Preceded by Larissa França and Juliana Felisberta (BRA)	Women's FIVB World Tour "Team of the Year" alongside (Brazil) Ana Paula Connelly; 2008	Succeeded by Larissa França and Juliana Felisberta (BRA)
