= 1993 European Beach Volleyball Championships =

International beach volleyball competition

The 1993 European Beach Volleyball Championships were held in August, 1993 in Almería, Spain. It was the first official edition of the men's event.

== Men's competition ==
RANK	FINAL RANKING
1st place, gold medalist(s)	Jean-Philippe Jodard and Christian Penigaud (FRA)
2nd place, silver medalist(s)	Jan Kvalheim and Bjørn Maaseide (NOR)
3rd place, bronze medalist(s)	Andrea Ghiurghi and Dio Lequaglie (ITA)
4.	Manuel Berenguel and Javier Yuste (ESP)
