= Kevin Wong =

American beach volleyball player

Personal information
- Born: September 12, 1972 (age 54); Honolulu, Hawai'i
- Height: 6 ft 7 in (201 cm)
- Education: UCLA
Medal record
Men's beach volleyball
Representing the United States
World Tour
Gold medal – first place	2002 Espinho	Beach
Gold medal – first place	2010 Milner	Beach
Silver medal – second place	2002 Fortaleza	Beach
Silver medal – second place	2003 Klagenfurt	Beach
Bronze medal – third place	2002 Gstaad	Beach
Bronze medal – third place	2002 Montreal	Beach

Kevin Kahn Wong (born September 12, 1972, in Honolulu, Hawaii) is a retired American professional beach volleyball player. He currently lives in Hawaii and runs a volleyball training program for youth.

== Personal life ==
Wong graduated from the Punahou School. He then attended UCLA and received his degree in economics in 1995. Wong was named to People Magazine's "50 Most Beautiful People" issue in 2000. He was honored by the Chinese Historical Society of Southern California in "Celebrating Chinese Americans in Sports", May 2009. He served as a beach volleyball analyst for NBC Sports at the Summer Olympics of 2012 and 2016 and continues to work on all of NBC's coverage. He is the founder and director of Spike and Serve, a Hawaii-based non-profit program that aims to positively shape lives through the sport of volleyball. Wong is also involved with the Chinese American variation of volleyball called 9-man. He is featured in the documentary about the sport called 9-Man. Wong is active in the community where he grew up, a Hawaii board member of the Positive Coaching Alliance In 2014, Wong was honored by USA Volleyball as the junior service award winner for outstanding male coach after leading his U15 team to an undefeated gold medal finish at the Girls Junior National Championships.

== Career ==
At UCLA, the 6'7" Wong was a three-time All-American. He helped the team win NCAA championships in 1993 and 1995. After college, he switched to professional beach volleyball. In 2000, he paired with Rob Heidger to finish 5th at the Sydney Olympics. In 2007, Wong partnered on the AVP Tour with no other than Karch Kiraly. Along with partner Casey Jennings, they successfully ended the 2010 season by capturing gold at the Swatch FIVB World Tour after beating the Brazilian duo of Benjamin Insfran and Bruno Schmidt at The Hague, Netherlands.
