= Nicoletta Luciani =

Italian volleyball player

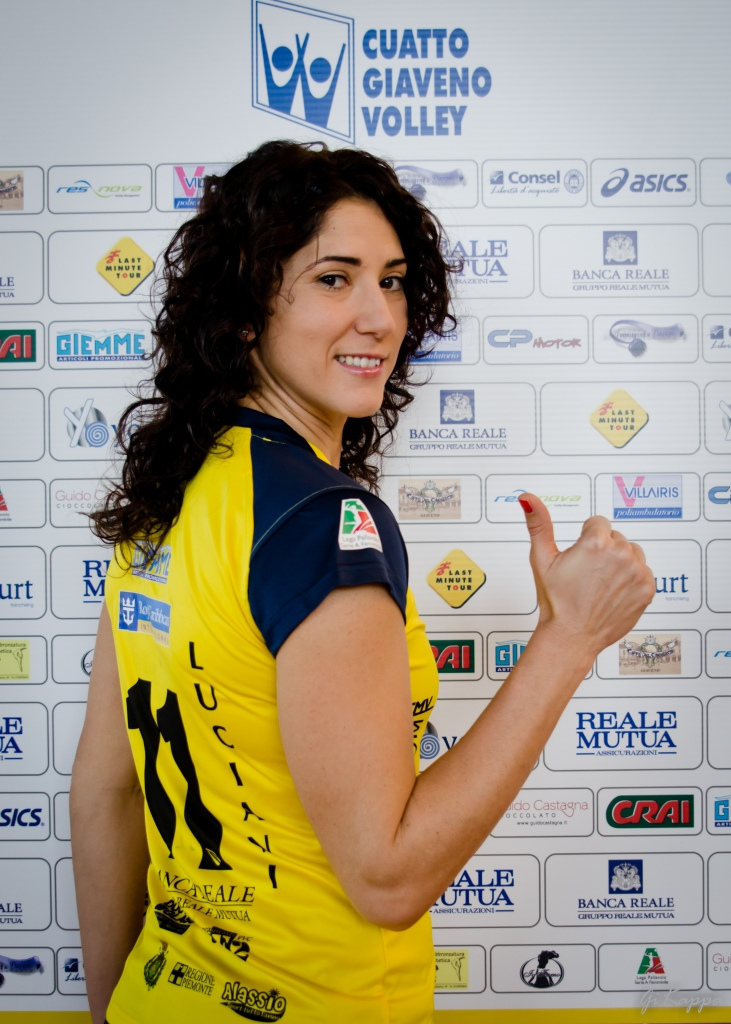
- Nicoletta in 2012

Personal information
- Nationality: Italy
- Born: 11 April 1982 (age 44); Chiaravalle, Italy
- Hometown: Giaveno, Italy
- Height: 1.85 m (6 ft 1 in)

Volleyball information
- Position: Libero
- Current club: (Italy) Cuatto Volley Giaveno
- Number: 11

Career
Years	Teams
2011-2016	(Italy) Cuatto Volley Giaveno

Nicoletta Luciani (born 22 November 1979 in Chiaravalle) is an Italian professional volleyball player, playing as a libero. She now plays for Cuatto Volley Giaveno.
