= Danja Müsch =

German beach volleyball player (born 1971)

Personal information
- Born: 14 April 1971 (age 55) Kassel, West Germany
- Height: 5 ft 10 in (178 cm)
Medal record
Women's volleyball
Representing Germany
European Championships
Gold medal – first place	1994 Almería	Beach volleyball
Silver medal – second place	1996 Pescara	Beach volleyball
Silver medal – second place	2000 Bilbao	Beach volleyball

Danja Müsch (born 14 April 1971 in Kassel) is a female former beach volleyball player from Germany, who represented her native country in three consecutive Summer Olympics: 1996, 2000, and 2004. Partnering with Beate Bühler, she claimed the gold medal at the 1994 European Championships in Almería, Spain.

== After volleyball ==
Müsch currently works for German TV station Sport1, reporting on volleyball and handball.

== Playing partners ==
- Beate Bühler
- Maike Friedrichsen
- Susanne Lahme
- Jana Vollmer
