= Effrosyni Sfyri =

Greek beach volleyball player (born 1971)

Personal information
- Nickname: "Efi"
- Nationality: Greece
- Born: January 8, 1971 (age 55); Athens, Greece
- Height: 1.80 m (5 ft 11 in)
- Weight: 67 kg (148 lb)
Honours
Beach volleyball
European Championships
Gold medal – first place	2001 Jesolo	Women's

Effrosyni "Efi" Sfyri (Greek: Ευφροσύνη "Έφη" Σφυρή; born January 8, 1971, in Athens) is a Greek beach volleyball player.

Sfyri competed at the FIVB Beach Volleyball World Tour between 1997 and 2004 always with the same partner, Vasso Karantasiou.

At the 2000 Summer Olympics, Karantasiou and Sfyri have already lost in their debut against Laura Bruschini and Annamaria Solazzi, from Italy. In the repechage round they won one match and lost one another ending at 17th place. A year later, they won the European Championships in Jesolo, near Venice, Italy.

In 2004 they qualified for another Olympics, this time in your hometown Athens. They won two matches in the group stage and advanced to the knockout round, but they lost against the Brazilians Ana Paula Connelly and Sandra Pires in front of a sold-out crowd.
