= Sandra Pires =

Brazilian beach volleyball player

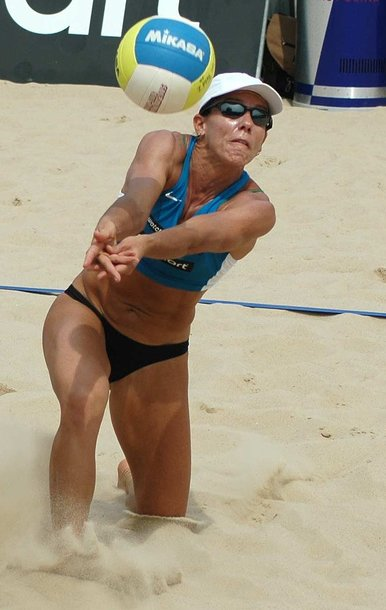
- Pires in Berlin, Germany, 2005

Personal information
- Full name: Sandra Tavares Pires Nascimento
- Born: 16 June 1973 (age 53); Rio de Janeiro, Brazil
- Height: 1.74 m (5 ft 9 in)
Honours
Women's beach volleyball
Representing Brazil
Olympic Games
Gold medal – first place	1996 Atlanta	Beach
Bronze medal – third place	2000 Sydney	Beach
World Championships
Gold medal – first place	1997 Los Angeles	Beach
Silver medal – second place	2001 Klagenfurt	Beach

Sandra Tavares Pires Nascimento (born 16 June 1973) is a Brazilian retired beach volleyball player. She won the gold medal in the inaugural women's beach volleyball tournament at the 1996 Summer Olympics in Atlanta, partnering with Jackie Silva.

Pires also represented her native country at the 2000 Summer Olympics in Sydney, where she claimed the bronze medal, teaming up with Adriana Samuel. She was also the flagbearer at the opening ceremony.

Pires was the flagbearer for the second time at the 2016 Summer Olympics in Rio de Janeiro.

In her beach volleyball career, Pires won 23 tournaments and $800,000 in prizes.

In 2014, Pires was inducted into the International Volleyball Hall of Fame.

Olympic Games
Preceded by Marcelo Apovian	Flagbearer for Brazil; Sydney 2000	Succeeded by Mirella Arnhold
Sporting positions
Preceded by Adriana Samuel and Mônica Rodrigues (BRA)	Women's FIVB Beach World Tour Winner alongside (Brazil) Jackie Silva; 1995–1996	Succeeded by Adriana Behar and Shelda Bede (BRA)
Preceded by Kerri Walsh and Misty May-Treanor (USA)	Women's FIVB Beach World Tour Winner alongside (Brazil) Ana Paula Connelly; 2003	Succeeded by Adriana Behar and Shelda Bede (BRA)
