= Amanda Glover =

British beach volleyball player (born 1970)

Personal information
- Nationality: British
- Born: 16 July 1970 (age 55); Weymouth, England

Sport
- Sport: Beach volleyball

Amanda Glover (born 16 July 1970) is a British beach volleyball player. She competed in the women's tournament at the 1996 Summer Olympics.
