= Laura Bruschini =

Italian beach volleyball player (born 1966)

Personal information
- Nationality: Italian
- Born: 26 August 1966 (age 59) Lecco, Italy
- Height: 173 cm (5 ft 8 in)
Medal record
Women's volleyball
Representing Italy
European Championships
Gold medal – first place	1997 Rome	Beach
Gold medal – first place	1999 Palma de Mallorca	Beach
Gold medal – first place	2000 Bilbao	Beach
Bronze medal – third place	1996 Pescara	Beach
Bronze medal – third place	1998 Rhodos	Beach

Laura Bruschini (born 26 August 1966 in Lecco) is a female former beach volleyball player from Italy who represented her native country at the 2000 Summer Olympics. Partnering with Annamaria Solazzi, she thrice claimed the gold medal at the European Championships: 1997, 1999, and 2000.

== Playing partners ==
- Annamaria Solazzi
- Daniela Gattelli
- Nicoletta Luciani
- Diletta Lunardi
- Caterina De Marinis
- Cristiana Parenzan
