= Vegard Høidalen =

Norwegian beach volleyball player (born 1971)

Personal information
- Nickname: The Viking
- Nationality: Norwegian
- Born: 10 May 1971 (age 55) Skien, Norway
- Height: 193 cm (6 ft 4 in)
- Weight: 94 kg (207 lb)
Beach volleyball information
Current teammate
Years	Teammate	Tours (points)
1995–2004, 2008-Present	Jørre Kjemperud	107 (6461)
Previous teammates
Years	Teammate	Tours (points)
2004–2008	Kjell Arne Gøranson	26 (960)
Honours
Men's beach volleyball
Representing Norway
World Championships
Bronze medal – third place	2001 Klagenfurt	Beach
Swatch FIVB World Tour
Gold medal – first place	1998 Berlin	Beach
Silver medal – second place	2000 Marseille	Beach
Bronze medal – third place	2002 Klagenfurt	Beach
Silver medal – second place	2003 Espinho	Beach
Silver medal – second place	2004 Espinho	Beach
Bronze medal – third place	2004 Stare Jablonki	Beach
European Championships
Gold medal – first place	1997 Rome	Beach
Bronze medal – third place	1998 Rhodos	Beach
Bronze medal – third place	2000 Bilbao	Beach
Bronze medal – third place	2001 Jesolo	Beach
Bronze medal – third place	2002 Basel	Beach
- Updated on 3 September 2008

Vegard Høidalen (born 10 May 1971 in Skien) is a former professional beach volleyball player from Norway who twice represented his native country at the Summer Olympics: 2000 and 2004. Partnering with Jørre Kjemperud, he won the bronze medal in the men's beach team competition at the 2001 Beach Volleyball World Championships in Klagenfurt, Austria.

Høidalen was for a period in 2008 suspended from beach volleyball, because of three violations within an 18-month period of Antidoping Norge's requirements regarding athlete availability for out-of-competition testing, which includes failure to provide whereabouts information. Høidalen was critical to how the system works.
