= Jørre Kjemperud =

Norwegian beach volleyball player (born 1968)

Personal information
- Full name: Jørre André Kjemperud
- Nationality: Norwegian
- Born: 31 August 1968 (age 58); Vikersund, Norway
- Height: 188 cm (6 ft 2 in)
- Weight: 85 kg (187 lb)

Beach volleyball information

Current teammate
Years	Teammate	Tours (points)
1995-2004, 2008-Present	Vegard Høidalen	107 (6461)

Previous teammates
Years	Teammate	Tours (points)
2005–2008; 1994–1995; 2004	Tarjei Skarlund; Kris Hjeltnes; Iver Horrem	58 (5063); 7 (16); 1 (54)
Honours
Men's beach volleyball
Representing Norway
World Championships
Bronze medal – third place	2001 Klagenfurt	Beach
World Tour
Gold medal – first place	1998 Berlin	Beach
Silver medal – second place	2000 Marseille	Beach
Bronze medal – third place	2002 Klagenfurt	Beach
Silver medal – second place	2003 Espinho	Beach
Silver medal – second place	2004 Espinho	Beach
Bronze medal – third place	2004 Stare Jablonki	Beach
European Championships
Gold medal – first place	1997 Rome	Beach
Bronze medal – third place	1998 Rhodes	Beach
Bronze medal – third place	2000 Bilbao	Beach
Bronze medal – third place	2001 Jesolo	Beach
Bronze medal – third place	2002 Basel	Beach

Jørre André Kjemperud (born 31 August 1968 in Vikersund) is a former beach volleyball player from Norway.

== Volleyball ==
Kjemperud started playing volleyball when he was 17 – 18 years old. He has played 20 matches on the men's national team.

== Beach volleyball ==
While playing indoor volleyball, Kjemperud used beach volleyball as a preparation for the indoor season, but after a while, beach volleyball became his main sport.

He always wears his cap backwards.

=== Team Kjemperud – Hoidalen ===
Kjemperud won the bronze medal in the men's beach team competition at the 2001 Beach Volleyball World Championships in Klagenfurt, Austria, partnering Vegard Høidalen. Kjemperud/Høidalen teamed up in 1995, and split up in 2004. They did not spend much time together outside practice and matches, and the team was known for being temperamental on court. Kjemperud/Høidalen represented Norway at the 2000 Summer Olympics in Sydney, Australia, and the 2004 Summer Olympics in Athens, Greece, and both times they ended up in 9th place. Kjemperud teamed up with Hoidalen again in 2008.

=== Team Kjemperud – Skarlund ===
His best placements on the world tour with teammate Tarjei Skarlund were 4th place in 2007, and 5th place in 2006, 2007, and 2008. Kjemperud/Skarlund teamed up in 2005. Kjemperud and Skarlund represented Norway at the 2008 Summer Olympics in Beijing, China. The team split up after the Olympics, where they ended up in 19th place.
