= Paul Laciga =

Swiss beach volleyball player (born 1970)

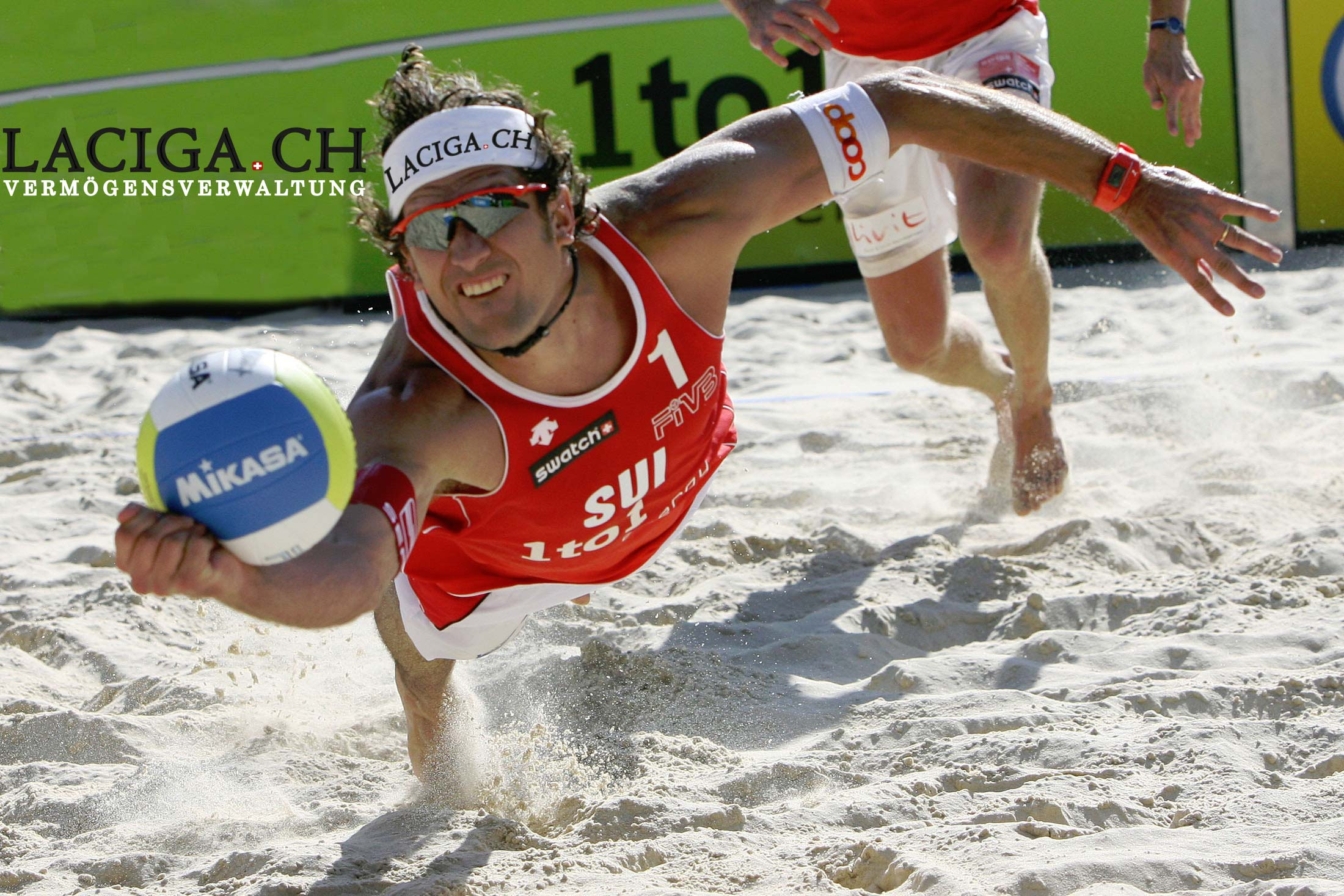

Personal information
- Born: 24 November 1970 (age 55); Bern, Switzerland
- Height: 6 ft 4 in (193 cm)
Honours
Men's beach volleyball
Representing Switzerland
World Championships
Silver medal – second place	1999 Marseille	Beach
Silver medal – second place	2005 Berlin	Beach
European Championships
Gold medal – first place	1998 Rhodos	Beach
Gold medal – first place	1999 Palma	Beach
Gold medal – first place	2000 Bilbao	Beach
Silver medal – second place	2001 Jesolo	Beach
Silver medal – second place	2002 Basel	Beach
Bronze medal – third place	1997 Rome	Beach

Paul Laciga (born 24 November 1970 in Bern) is a beach volleyball player from Switzerland who won the silver medal in the men's beach team competition at the 2005 Beach Volleyball World Championships in Berlin, Germany, partnering Sascha Heyer. He represented his native country at two consecutive Summer Olympics, starting in 2000 (Sydney, Australia).

Laciga and his younger brother Martin (born 1975) teamed from 1995 through 2004 to place fifth in two Olympics (Sydney 2000 and Athens 2004) while competing together in four FIVB World Championships (1997, 1999, 2001 and 2003) and the 1998 Goodwill Games in New York City. The Swiss brothers won six international gold medals (five SWATCH titles and a 1997 FIVB Challenge crown in the Czech Republic).

Laciga earned FIVB World Championship silver medals with his brother in 1997 in Marseille, France, and with Sascha Heyer in 2005 at Berlin. Sandwiched between bronze (1997 Italy) and silver medal finishes (2001 Italy, and 2002 Switzerland), the Lacigas captured three-straight European continental championships (1998 Greece, 1999 Majorca and 2000 Spain).

== Playing partners ==
- Sascha Heyer
- Martin Laciga
