= Martin Laciga =

Swiss beach volleyball player (1975–2023)

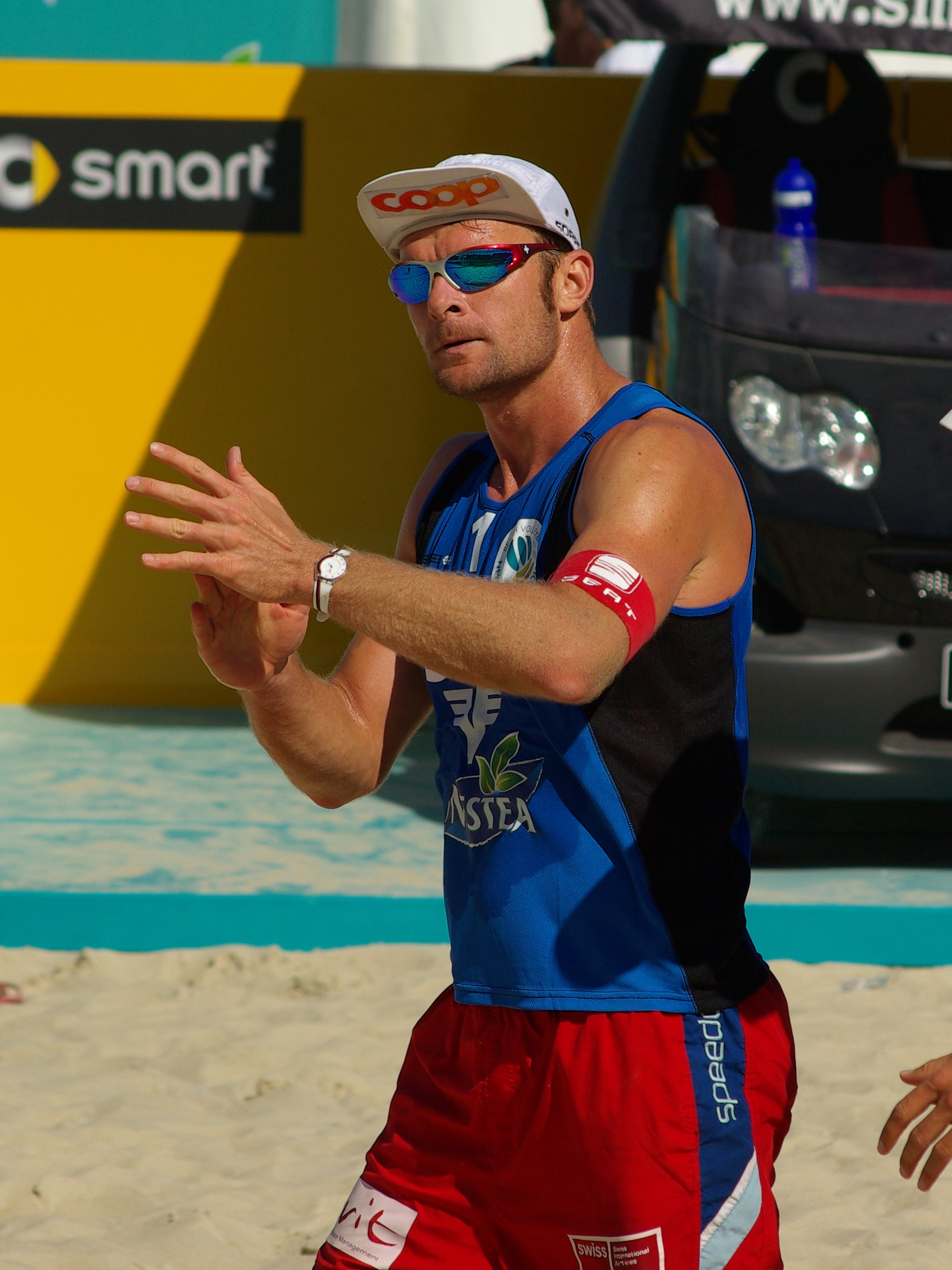
- Laciga in 2008

Personal information
- Born: 25 January 1975; Aarberg, Switzerland
- Died: 22 August 2023 (aged 48)
- Height: 6 ft 5 in (196 cm)
Honours
Men's beach volleyball
Representing Switzerland
World Championships
Silver medal – second place	1999 Marseille	Beach
European Championships
Gold medal – first place	1998 Rhodos	Beach
Gold medal – first place	1999 Palma	Beach
Gold medal – first place	2000 Bilbao	Beach
Silver medal – second place	2001 Jesolo	Beach
Silver medal – second place	2002 Basel	Beach
Bronze medal – third place	1997 Rome	Beach

Martin Laciga (25 January 1975 – 22 August 2023) was a Swiss beach volleyball player, who won the silver medal in the men's beach team competition at the 1999 Beach Volleyball World Championships in Marseille, France, partnering his older brother Paul Laciga (born 1970). He represented his native country at two consecutive Summer Olympics, starting in 2000 (Sydney, Australia).

Laciga announced his retirement from competition in 2013 due to injuries. He died on 22 August 2023, at the age of 48.

== Playing partners ==
- Markus Egger
- Paul Laciga
- Jan Schnider

== Sponsors ==
- Swatch
