= Annamaria Solazzi =

Italian beach volleyball player (born 1965)

Personal information
- Nationality: Italian
- Born: 10 December 1965 (age 60) Ancona, Italy
- Height: 5 ft 9 in (175 cm)
Medal record
Women's volleyball
Representing Italy
European Championships
Gold medal – first place	1997 Rome	Beach
Gold medal – first place	1999 Palma de Mallorca	Beach
Gold medal – first place	2000 Bilbao	Beach
Bronze medal – third place	1996 Pescara	Beach
Bronze medal – third place	1998 Rhodos	Beach

Annamaria Solazzi (born 10 December 1965) is a female former beach volleyball player from Italy who twice represented her native country at the Summer Olympics: 1996 and 2000. Partnering with Laura Bruschini, she thrice claimed the gold medal at the European Championships: in 1997, 1999 and 2000.

== Playing partners ==
- Laura Bruschini
- Gaia Cicola
- Giseli Gavio
- Daniela Gioria
- Nicoletta Luciani
- Diletta Lunardi
- Consuelo Turetta
