= Martina Hudcová =

Czech beach volleyball player (born 1966)

Personal information
- Nationality: Czech
- Born: 26 March 1966 (age 60) Brno, Czechoslovakia

Sport
- Sport: Beach volleyball

Martina Hudcová (born 26 March 1966) is a Czech beach volleyball player. She competed in the women's tournament at the 2000 Summer Olympics.
