= Maria José Schuller =

Portuguese beach volleyball player (born 1965)

Personal information
- Nationality: Portuguese
- Born: 13 February 1965 (age 60)

Sport
- Sport: Beach volleyball

Maria José Schuller (born 13 February 1965) is a Portuguese beach volleyball player. She competed in the women's tournament at the 2000 Summer Olympics.
