= Kaarel Kais =

Estonian volleyball player (born 1974)

Kaarel Kais (born 13 September 1974) is an Estonian volleyball player.

He was born in Tallinn. In 2006 he graduated from the University of Tartu's Faculty of Law.

He started his volleyball exercising in 1984, coached by his father. He has played at volleyball clubs Pärnu Võrkpalliklubi, and Tartu Pere Leib. Since 1991 he has focused on beach volleyball. Before 2003 and since 2010, he has played with his brother Kristjan Kais. He is multiple-times Estonian champion in beach volleyball.

1999–2002 he and his brother Kristjan were named as the Best Beach Volleyball Players of Estonia.
