= Sascha Heyer =

Swiss beach volleyball player (born 1972)

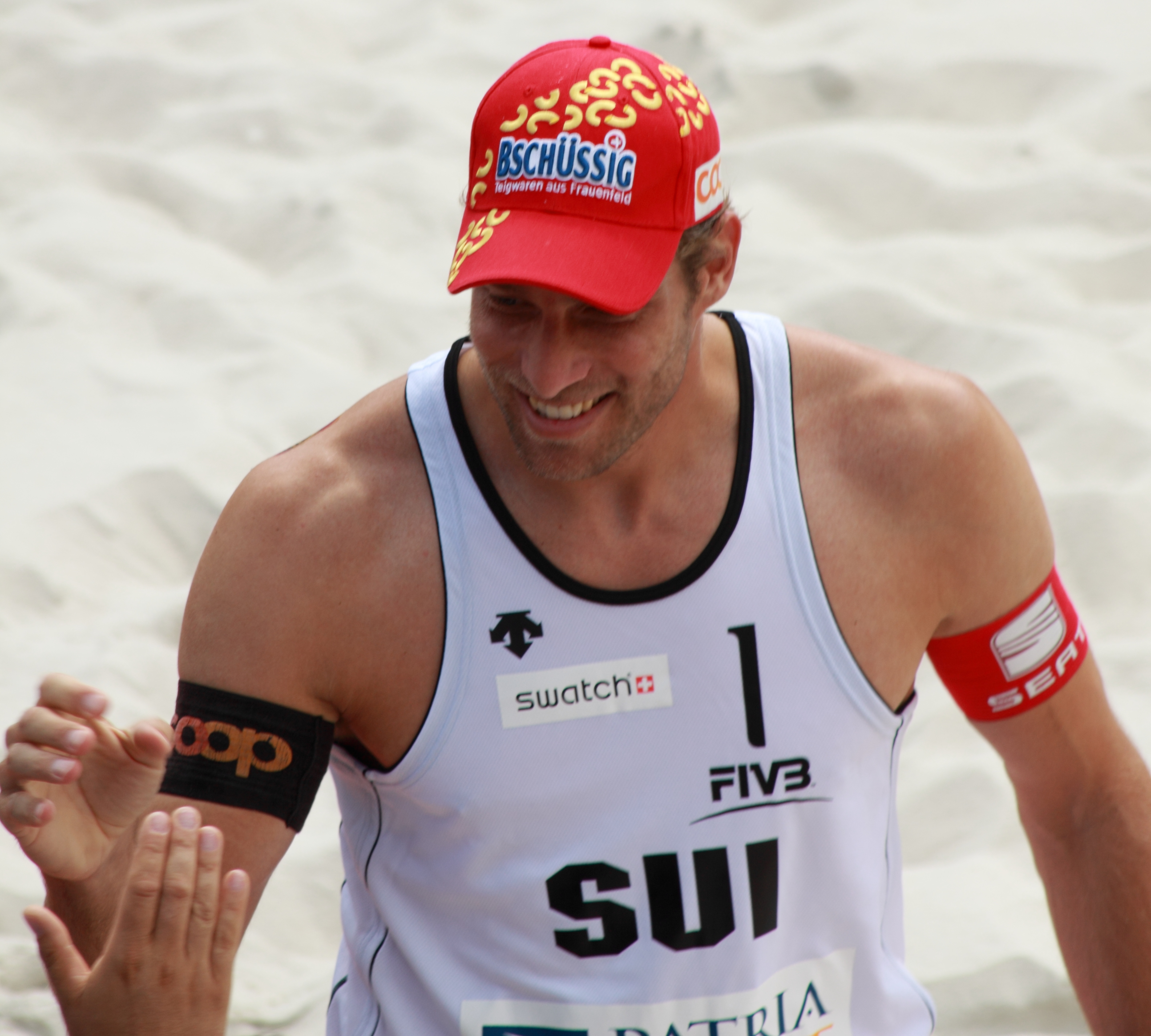

Personal information
- Born: 21 July 1972 (age 54); Zürich, Switzerland
- Height: 6 ft 8 in (203 cm)
Honours
Men's beach volleyball
Representing Switzerland
World Championships
Silver medal – second place	2005 Berlin	Beach
European Championships
Gold medal – first place	2001 Jesolo	Beach
Silver medal – second place	2000 Bilbao	Beach
Silver medal – second place	2004 Timmendorfer Strand	Beach
Bronze medal – third place	2003 Alanya	Beach

Sascha Heyer (born 21 July 1972 in Zürich) is a beach volleyball player from Switzerland who won the silver medal in the men's beach team competition at the 2005 Beach Volleyball World Championships in Berlin, Germany, with partner Paul Laciga. As of 2011, his current partner is Sébastien Chevallier. The pair participated in the 2012 Summer Olympics tournament where they lost in the round of 16.

== Playing partners ==
- Paul Laciga
- Patrick Heuscher
- Sébastien Chevallier
- Martin Tschudi
- Nick Heyer
