= Lucilla Perrotta =

Italian beach volleyball player (born 1975)

Personal information
- Nationality: Italian
- Born: 3 June 1975 (age 51); Rome, Italy
- Height: 178 cm (5 ft 10 in)
Honours
Women's beach volleyball
Representing Italy
European Championships
| Gold medal – first place | 2002 Basel | Beach |
| Silver medal – second place | 1997 Rome | Beach |
| Bronze medal – third place | 1994 Almería | Beach |
| Bronze medal – third place | 1995 Saint-Quay | Beach |
| Bronze medal – third place | 2003 Alanya | Beach |
| Bronze medal – third place | 2004 Timmendorfer Strand | Beach |

Lucilla Perrotta (born 3 June 1975 in Rome) is a female former professional beach volleyball player from Italy who represented her native country at the Summer Olympics in 2000 and 2004. Partnering with Daniela Gattelli, she claimed the gold medal at the 2002 European Championships in Basel, Switzerland.
