= Eva Celbová =

Czech beach volleyball player (born 1975)

Personal information
- Full name: Eva Celbová-Ryšavá
- Born: 8 March 1975 (age 51); Náchod, Czech Republic
Honours
Women's beach volleyball
Representing the Czech Republic
World Championships
Bronze medal – third place	2001 Klagenfurt	Beach
European Championships
Gold medal – first place	1996 Pescara	Beach
Gold medal – first place	1998 Rhodos	Beach
Bronze medal – third place	1997 Rome	Beach
Bronze medal – third place	1999 Palma de Mallorca	Beach
Bronze medal – third place	2002 Basel	Beach

Eva Celbová-Ryšavá (born 8 March 1975 in Náchod) is a female beach volleyball player from the Czech Republic, who twice represented her native country at the Summer Olympics in 2000 and 2004. Partnering Sona Novaková she claimed the gold medal at the 1998 European Championships.

== Playing partners ==
- Soňa Nováková
- Šárka Nakládalová
- Tereza Petrová
- Marika Těknědžjanová
- Tereza Tobiášová
