= Soňa Nováková =

Czech beach volleyball player (born 1975)

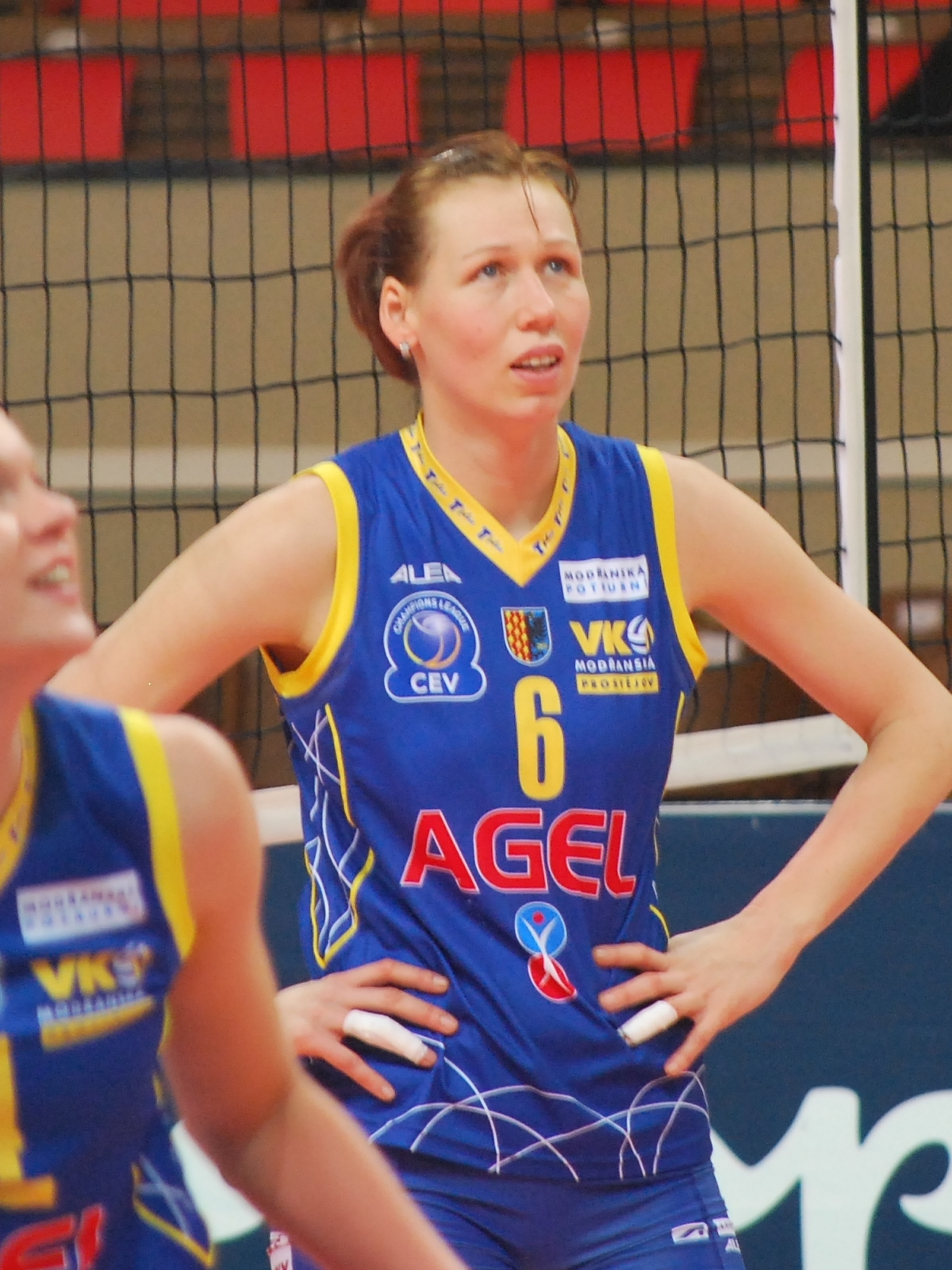

Personal information
- Born: 6 October 1975 (age 50)
Medal record
Women's volleyball
Representing the Czech Republic
World Championships
Bronze medal – third place	2001 Klagenfurt	Beach
European Championships
Gold medal – first place	1996 Pescara	Beach
Gold medal – first place	1998 Rhodos	Beach
Bronze medal – third place	1997 Rome	Beach
Bronze medal – third place	1999 Palma de Mallorca	Beach
Bronze medal – third place	2002 Basel	Beach

Soňa Nováková-Dosoudilová (born 6 October 1975 in Olomouc) is a female beach volleyball player from the Czech Republic. She twice represented her native country at the Summer Olympics: 2000 and 2004. Partnering Eva Celbová she claimed the gold medal at the 1998 European Championships.

== Playing partners ==
- Eva Celbová
- Petra Novotná
- Lucie Růžková
- Tereza Tobiášová
- Monika Kučerová
- Martina Šmídová
