= Axel Hager =

German beach volleyball player (born 1969)

Personal information
- Born: 14 March 1969 (age 57); Burg auf Fehmarn, West Germany
- Height: 6 ft 8 in (2.03 m)
Honours
Men's beach volleyball
Representing Germany
Olympic Games
| Bronze medal – third place | 2000 Sydney | Beach |
European Championships
| Silver medal – second place | 1996 Pescara | Beach |
| Bronze medal – third place | 1994 Almería | Beach |

Axel Hager (born 14 March 1969) is a beach volleyball player from Germany, who won the bronze medal in the men's beach team competition at the 2000 Summer Olympics in Sydney, Australia, partnering Jörg Ahmann. He also represented his native country at the 1996 Summer Olympics in Atlanta.
