= Daniela Gattelli =

Italian beach volleyball player (born 1975)

Personal information
- Nationality: Italian
- Born: 19 November 1975 (age 50); Ravenna, Italy
- Height: 5 ft 11 in (180 cm)
Honours
Women's beach volleyball
Representing Italy
European Championships
Gold medal – first place	2002 Basel	Beach
Silver medal – second place	1997 Rome	Beach
Bronze medal – third place	2003 Alanya	Beach
Bronze medal – third place	2004 Timmendorfer Strand	Beach

Daniela Gattelli (born 19 November 1975 in Ravenna) is a former professional beach volleyball player from Italy who twice represented her native country at the Summer Olympics: 2000 and 2004. Partnering with Lucilla Perrotta, she claimed the gold medal at the 2002 European Championships in Basel, Switzerland.

== Playing partners ==
- Lucilla Perrotta
- Daniela Gioria
- Laura Bruschini
- Giulia Momoli
