= Jörg Ahmann =

German beach volleyball player

Personal information
- Born: 12 February 1966 (age 60); Grevenbroich, West Germany
- Height: 6 ft 3 in (1.91 m)
Honours
Men's beach volleyball
Representing Germany
Olympic Games
Bronze medal – third place	2000 Sydney	Beach
European Championships
Silver medal – second place	1996 Pescara	Beach
Bronze medal – third place	1994 Almería	Beach

Jörg Ahmann (born 12 February 1966) is a beach volleyball player from Germany, who won the bronze medal in the men's beach team competition at the 2000 Summer Olympics in Sydney, Australia, partnering Axel Hager. He also represented his native country at the 1996 Summer Olympics in Atlanta, Georgia.
