= Beach volleyball at the 2004 Summer Olympics – Men's tournament =

Men's beach volleyball at the Games of the XXVIII Olympiad
- Venue: Olympic Beach Volleyball Centre
- Dates: 14–25 August 2004
- Competitors: 48 from 17 nations

Medalists
1st place, gold medalist(s)		Emanuel Rego; Ricardo Santos	Brazil
2nd place, silver medalist(s)		Javier Bosma; Pablo Herrera	Spain
3rd place, bronze medalist(s)		Patrick Heuscher; Stefan Kobel	Switzerland

The men's beach volleyball event at the 2004 Summer Olympics in Athens, Greece, was held at the Olympic Beach Volleyball Centre located at the Faliro Coastal Zone Olympic Complex.

== Pool play ==
The 24 competing teams were split equally into six pools of four, and each team played each of the other teams in their pool a best of three set match (so that the number of pool matches, P, played by each team was 3).

The teams in each pool were ranked first through fourth based on the number of matches won, W. In the event of a two-way tie, the winning team in the head-to-head match finished ahead. In a three-team tie, the total number of points each team won and lost during all matches involving only the three tied teams were added up, and the bottom-ranked team of the three was decided by the points for to points against ratio; the other two teams were then ranked according to the outcome of the head-to-head match. The top two teams from each pool and the four best third placed teams (based on: first, matches won; second (in the event of a tie), set ratio SF/SA; and third (if there is still a tie), points ratio PF/PA) progressed through to the round of sixteen (single elimination tournament).

Two points (Pts) were awarded for each match win (W) and one point was given for each loss (L).
In individual matches, all winners are shown in bold.
In group tables advancing teams are highlighted.

=== Pool A ===
Team	P:	W:	L:	SF:	SA:	PF:	PA:	Pts:
Ricardo Santos and Emanuel Rego (BRA)	3	3	0	6	1	139	107	**6**
Daxton Holdren and Stein Metzger (USA)	3	1	2	3	5	138	152	**4**
Andrew Schacht and Joshua Slack (AUS)	3	1	2	3	4	135	138	**4**
Iver Horrem and Bjørn Maaseide (NOR)	3	1	2	3	5	132	147	**4**

August 15

**Holdren & Metzger**	**2–1**	Schacht & Slack	22–24, 24–22, 15–13
**Santos & Rego**	**2–1**	Horrem & Maaseide	21–15, 19–21, 15–10

August 17

Holdren & Metzger	**1–2**	**Horrem & Maaseide**	21–14, 15–21, 14–16
**Santos & Rego**	**2–0**	Schacht & Slack	21–17, 21–17

August 19

**Schacht & Slack**	**2–0**	Horrem & Maaseide	21–18, 21–17
**Santos & Rego**	**2–0**	Holdren & Metzger	21–17, 21–10

=== Pool B ===
Team	P:	W:	L:	SF:	SA:	PF:	PA:	Pts:
Andreas Scheuerpflug and Christoph Dieckmann (GER)	3	2	1	5	3	147	140	**5**
Benjamin Insfran and Márcio Araújo (BRA)	3	2	1	4	2	124	111	**5**
Francisco Álvarez and Juan Rossell (CUB)	3	1	2	3	4	133	137	**4**
Stéphane Canet and Mathieu Hamel (FRA)	3	1	2	2	5	117	133	**4**

August 15

**Scheuerpflug & Dieckmann**	**2–1**	Alvarez & Rossell	21–19, 19–21, 15–10
**Insfran & Araujo**	**2–0**	Canet & Hamel	21–13, 21–14

August 17

Scheuerpflug & Dieckmann	**1–2**	**Canet & Hamel**	21–17, 18–21, 10–15
**Insfran & Araujo**	**2–0**	Alvarez & Rossell	23–21, 22–20

August 19

**Alvarez & Rossell**	**2–0**	Canet & Hamel	21–18, 21–19
Insfran & Araujo	**0–2**	**Scheuerpflug & Dieckmann**	20–22, 17–21

=== Pool C ===
Team	P:	W:	L:	SF:	SA:	PF:	PA:	Pts:
Javier Bosma and Pablo Herrera (ESP)	3	3	0	6	2	150	124	**6**
Paul Laciga and Martin Laciga (SUI)	3	2	1	5	2	133	117	**5**
Nikolas Berger and Florian Gosch (AUT)	3	1	2	2	4	105	118	**4**
Robert Nowotny and Peter Gartmayer (AUT)	3	0	3	1	6	110	139	**3**

August 15

**Laciga & Laciga**	**2–0**	Nowotny & Gartmayer	21–14, 21–14
Berger & Gosch	**0–2**	**Bosma & Herrera**	14–21, 13–21

August 17

Laciga & Laciga	**1–2**	**Bosma & Herrera**	19–21, 21–17, 9–15
**Berger & Gosch**	**2–0**	Nowotny & Gartmayer	21–17, 21–17

August 19

**Bosma & Herrera**	**2–1**	Nowotny & Gartmayer	21–16, 19–21, 15–11
**Laciga & Laciga**	**2–0**	Berger & Gosch	21–17, 21–19

=== Pool D ===
Team	P:	W:	L:	SF:	SA:	PF:	PA:	Pts:
Markus Dieckmann and Jonas Reckermann (GER)	3	2	1	5	2	145	121	**5**
Björn Berg and Simon Dahl (SWE)	3	2	1	4	3	131	126	**5**
Jørre Kjemperud and Vegard Høidalen (NOR)	3	2	1	4	4	148	153	**5**
Raúl Papaleo and Ramon Hernández (PUR)	3	0	3	2	6	130	154	**3**

August 14

Kjemperud & Høidalen	**0–2**	**Berg & Dahl**	13–21, 18–21
**Dieckmann & Reckermann**	**2–0**	Papaleo & Hernández	21–14, 21–13

August 16

**Kjemperud & Høidalen**	**2–1**	Papaleo & Hernández	18–21, 21–19, 15–10
**Dieckmann & Reckermann**	**2–0**	Berg & Dahl	21–16, 21–15

August 18

**Berg & Dahl**	**2–1**	Papaleo & Hernández	19–21, 21–16, 18–16
Dieckmann & Reckermann	**1–2**	**Kjemperud & Høidalen**	24–22, 24–26, 13–15

=== Pool E ===
Team	P:	W:	L:	SF:	SA:	PF:	PA:	Pts:
Stefan Kobel and Patrick Heuscher (SUI)	3	3	0	6	2	151	144	**6**
Julien Prosser and Mark Williams (AUS)	3	2	1	5	3	143	129	**5**
John Child and Mark Heese (CAN)	3	1	2	3	4	132	126	**4**
Dain Blanton and Jeff Nygaard (USA)	3	0	3	1	6	106	133	**3**

August 14

**Kobel & Heuscher**	**2–0**	Child & Heese	28–26, 21–18
Blanton & Nygaard	**0–2**	**Prosser & Williams**	16–21, 14–21

August 16

**Kobel & Heuscher**	**2–1**	Prosser & Williams	16–21, 22–20, 15–9
Blanton & Nygaard	**0–2**	**Child & Heese**	16–21, 10–21

August 18

**Kobel & Heuscher**	**2–1**	Blanton & Nygaard	21–16, 13–21, 15–13
**Prosser & Williams**	**2–1**	Child & Heese	21–13, 15–21, 15–12

=== Pool F ===
The Greek pair of Pavlos Beligratis and Athanasios Michalopoulos had to withdraw from their final group game after Beligratis incurred an injury, this gave their opponents Mariano Baracetti and Martín Conde a 21–0, 21–0 straight sets victory.

Team	P:	W:	L:	SF:	SA:	PF:	PA:	Pts:
Mariano Baracetti and Martín Conde (ARG)	3	3	0	6	1	133	70	**6**
Gershon Rorich and Colin Pocock (RSA)	3	2	1	4	3	130	134	**5**
Miguel Maia and João Brenha (POR)	3	1	2	3	4	124	126	**4**
Pavlos Beligratis and Athanasios Michalopoulos (GRE)	3	0	3	1	6	85	144	**2**

August 14

**Baracetti & Conde**	**2–1**	Maia & Brenha	13–21, 21–16, 15–5
Beligratis & Michalopoulos	**1–2**	**Rorich & Pocock**	16–21, 26–24, 10–15

August 16

**Baracetti & Conde**	**2–0**	Rorich & Pocock	21–13, 21–15
Beligratis & Michalopoulos	**0–2**	**Maia & Brenha**	14–21, 19–21

August 18

Maia & Brenha	**0–2**	**Rorich & Pocock**	20–22, 20–22
Beligratis & Michalopoulos	**0–2**	**Baracetti & Conde**	Walkover

== Playoffs ==
=== Round of 16 ===
20 August

Santos & Rego	2–1	Kjemperud & Høidalen	21–15, 19–21, 15–6
Maia & Brenha	0–2	Kobel & Heuscher	18–21, 19–21
Holdren & Metzger	2–1	Dieckmann & Reckermann	21–16, 19–21, 15–13
Bosma & Herrera	2–0	Berg & Dahl	21–16, 21–17

21 August

Insfran & Araujo	1–2	Laciga & Laciga	19–21, 21–19, 12–15
Baracetti & Conde	0–2	Child & Heese	17–21, 17–21
Rorich & Pocock	0–2	Prosser & Williams	14–21, 10–21
Schacht & Slack	0–2	Scheuerpflug & Dieckmann	19–21, 12–21

=== Quarter-finals ===
August 22

Santos & Rego	2–0	Laciga & Laciga	21–13, 21–16
Kobel & Heuscher	2–0	Holdren & Metzger	21–16, 21–19
Bosma & Herrera	2–1	Child & Heese	22–24, 21–19, 18–16
Prosser & Williams	2–1	Scheuerpflug & Dieckmann	16–21, 21–19, 15–10

=== Semi-finals ===
August 23

Santos & Rego	2–1	Kobel & Heuscher	21–14, 19–21, 15–12
Bosma & Herrera	2–0	Prosser & Williams	21–18, 21–18

=== Bronze-medal match ===
August 25

(bronze) Kobel & Heuscher	2–1	Prosser & Williams	19–21, 21–17, 15–13

This was Switzerland's first medal in beach volleyball.

=== Gold-medal match ===
August 25

(gold) Santos & Rego	2–0	Bosma & Herrera (silver)	21–16, 21–15

This was Brazil's first gold medal in men's beach volleyball.

== Final ranking ==
RANK	ATHLETE NAMES	COUNTRY	SEED
1st place, gold medalist(s)	Emanuel Rego and Ricardo Santos	Brazil	1
2nd place, silver medalist(s)	Javier Bosma and Pablo Herrera	Spain	15
3rd place, bronze medalist(s)	Patrick Heuscher and Stefan Kobel	Switzerland	5
4.	Julien Prosser and Mark Williams	Australia	17
5.	Martin Laciga and Paul Laciga	Switzerland	3
5.	Christoph Dieckmann and Andreas Scheuerpflug	Germany	11
5.	Dax Holdren and Stein Metzger	United States	12
5.	John Child and Mark Heese	Canada	20
9.	Márcio Araújo and Benjamin Insfran	Brazil	2
9.	Markus Dieckmann and Jonas Reckermann	Germany	4
9.	Mariano Baracetti and Martín Conde	Argentina	7
9.	Vegard Høidalen and Jørre Kjemperud	Norway	9
9.	Andrew Schacht and Joshua Slack	Australia	13
9.	Björn Berg and Simon Dahl	Sweden	16
9.	João Brenha and Miguel Maia	Portugal	18
9.	Colin Pocock and Gershon Rorich	South Africa	19
17.	Nikolas Berger and Florian Gosch	Austria	10
17.	Francisco Álvarez and Juan Rossell	Cuba	14
19.	Pavlos Beligratis and Athanasios Michalopoulos	Greece	6
19.	Dain Blanton and Jeff Nygaard	United States	8
19.	Ramon Hernández and Raúl Papaleo	Puerto Rico	21
19.	Peter Gartmayer and Robert Nowotny	Austria	22
19.	Stéphane Canet and Mathieu Hamel	France	23
19.	Iver Horrem and Bjørn Maaseide	Norway	24

== See also ==
- Volleyball at the Summer Olympics
