= Beach volleyball at the 2000 Summer Olympics – Men's tournament =

Men's beach volleyball at the Games of the XXVII Olympiad
- Venue: Bondi Beach Volleyball Centre
- Dates: 17–26 September 2000
- Competitors: 48 from 17 nations

Medalists
1st place, gold medalist(s)		Dain Blanton; Eric Fonoimoana	United States
2nd place, silver medalist(s)		Zé Marco de Melo; Ricardo Santos	Brazil
3rd place, bronze medalist(s)		Jörg Ahmann; Axel Hager	Germany

These page shows the results of the Men's Beach Volleyball Tournament at the 2000 Summer Olympics in Sydney, Australia, held from September 17 to September 26, 2000.

== Medals ==
Gold:	Silver:	Bronze:
United States; Dain Blanton; Eric Fonoimoana	Brazil; Zé Marco de Melo; Ricardo Santos	Germany; Jörg Ahmann; Axel Hager

== Results ==
=== Elimination rounds ===
==== Preliminary round ====
Winners advance to Round of 16 The 12 losers play elimination matches until 3 remain teams remain.
Competition Held on September 17, 2000

Match Number	Athletes	NOC	Score	Seed
1	Lee Zahner & Julien Prosser	Australia	12	1
1	Juan Alberto Rodriguez Ibarra & Joel Sotelo Villalobos	Mexico	15	24
2	Jan Kvalheim & Bjørn Maaseide	Norway	10	13
2	Miguel Maia & João Brenha	Portugal	15	12
3	John Child & Mark Heese	Canada	15	6
3	Jean-Philippe Jodard & Christian Penigaud	France	5	19
4	Jody Holden & Conrad Leinemann	Canada	17	18
4	Kevin Wong & Robert Heidger Jr	United States	15	7
5	Dain Blanton & Eric Fonoimoana	United States	15	9
5	Andreas Scheuerpflug & Oliver Oetke	Germany	7	16
6	Michal Palinek & Martin Lebl	Czech Republic	13	21
6	Paul Laciga & Martin Laciga	Switzerland	15	4
7	Zé Marco de Melo & Ricardo Santos	Brazil	15	3
7	Björn Berg & Simon Dahl	Sweden	5	22
8	Jörg Ahmann & Axel Hager	Germany	15	15
8	Fabio Diez & Javier Bosma	Spain	13	10
9	Vegard Høidalen and Jørre Kjemperud	Norway	15	8
9	Nikolas Berger & Oliver Stamm	Austria	6	17
10	Andrea Raffaelli & Maurizio Pimponi	Italy	7	20
10	Eduardo Esteban Martínez & Martín Alejo Conde	Argentina	15	5
11	Mariano Joaquin Baracetti & Jose Luis Abrantes Salema	Argentina	4	11
11	Sergey Ermishin & Mikhail Kouchnerev	Russia	15	14
12	Matt Grinlaubs & Josh Slack	Australia	3	23
12	José Loiola Jr & Emanuel Rego	Brazil	15	2

==== Preliminary Elimination ====
Competition Held on September 19, 2000,

First Round

Losers eliminated, and placed 19th

Match Number	Athletes	NOC	Score	Seed
13	Lee Zahner & Julien Prosser	Australia	15	1
13	Jan Kvalheim & Bjørn Maaseide	Norway	12	13
14	Jean-Philippe Jodard & Christian Penigaud	France	2	19
14	Kevin Wong & Robert Heidger Jr	United States	15	7
15	Andreas Scheuerpflug & Oliver Oetke	Germany	8	16
15	Michal Palinek & Martin Lebl	Czech Republic	15	21
16	Björn Berg & Simon Dahl	Sweden	11	22
16	Fabio Diez & Javier Bosma	Spain	15	10
17	Nikolas Berger & Oliver Stamm	Austria	15	17
17	Andrea Raffaelli & Maurizio Pimponi	Italy	9	20
18	Mariano Joaquin Baracetti & Jose Luis Abrantes Salema	Argentina	2	11
18	Matt Grinlaubs & Josh Slack	Australia	15	23

Second Round

Winners advance to Round of 16 plus team with highest point ratio; losers eliminated and place 17th

Match Number	Athletes	NOC	Score	Seed
19	Lee Zahner & Julien Prosser	Australia	15	1
19	Kevin Wong & Robert Heidger Jr	United States	11	7
20	Michal Palinek & Martin Lebl	Czech Republic	4	21
20	Fabio Diez & Javier Bosma	Spain	15	10
21	Nikolas Berger & Oliver Stamm	Austria	15	17
21	Matt Grinlaubs & Josh Slack	Australia	10	23

Kevin Wong & Robert Heidger Jr United States Qualified due to highest point ratio.

=== Round of 16 ===
Competition Held on September 22, 2000

- Losers eliminated, place ninth

Match Number	Athletes	NOC	Score	Seed
22	Juan Alberto Rodriguez Ibarra & Joel Sotelo Villalobos	Mexico	0	24
22	Kevin Wong & Robert Heidger Jr	United States	15	7
23	Dain Blanton & Eric Fonoimoana	United States	15	9
23	Vegard Høidalen and Jørre Kjemperud	Norway	13	8
24	Eduardo Esteban Martínez & Martín Alejo Conde	Argentina	3	5
24	Miguel Maia & João Brenha	Portugal	15	12
25	Lee Zahner & Julien Prosser	Australia	8	1
25	Paul Laciga & Martin Laciga	Switzerland	15	4
26	Zé Marco de Melo & Ricardo Santos	Brazil	16	3
26	Nikolas Berger & Oliver Stamm	Austria	14	17
27	Sergey Ermishin & Mikhail Kouchnerev	Russia	6	14
27	John Child & Mark Heese	Canada	15	6
28	Jody Holden & Conrad Leinemann	Canada	6	18
28	Jörg Ahmann & Axel Hager	Germany	15	15
29	Fabio Diez & Javier Bosma	Spain	17	10
29	Jose Loiola Jr & Emanuel Rego	Brazil	16	2

=== Quarter-finals ===
Competition Held on September 24, 2000

- Losers eliminated, place fifth

Match Number	Athletes	NOC	Score	Seed
30	Kevin Wong & Robert Heidger Jr	United States	3	7
30	Dain Blanton & Eric Fonoimoana	United States	15	9
31	Miguel Maia & João Brenha	Portugal	15	12
31	Paul Laciga & Martin Laciga	Switzerland	11	4
32	Zé Marco de Melo & Ricardo Santos	Brazil	15	3
32	John Child & Mark Heese	Canada	13	6
33	Jörg Ahmann & Axel Hager	Germany	16	15
33	Fabio Diez & Javier Bosma	Spain	14	10

=== Semi-finals ===
Competition Held on September 24, 2000

Match Number	Athletes	NOC	Score	Seed
34	Dain Blanton & Eric Fonoimoana	United States	15	9
34	Miguel Maia & João Brenha	Portugal	12	12
35	Zé Marco de Melo & Ricardo Santos	Brazil	15	3
35	Jörg Ahmann & Axel Hager	Germany	5	15

=== Bronze medal match ===
Competition Held on September 26, 2000

Match Number	Athletes	NOC	Score (Sets)	Seed
35	Miguel Maia & João Brenha	Portugal	0	12
35	Jörg Ahmann & Axel Hager	Germany	2	15

=== Gold Medal match ===
Competition Held on September 26, 2000

Match Number	Athletes	NOC	Score (Sets)	Seed
37	Dain Blanton & Eric Fonoimoana	United States	2	9
37	Zé Marco de Melo & Ricardo Santos	Brazil	0	3

== Final ranking ==
RANK	NOC	ATHLETES NAMES	SEED
Gold medal	United States	Dain Blanton and Eric Fonoimoana	9
Silver medal	Brazil	Zé Marco de Melo and Ricardo Santos	3
Bronze medal	Germany	Jörg Ahmann and Axel Hager	15
4.	Portugal	João Brenha and Miguel Maia	12
5.	Switzerland	Martin Laciga and Paul Laciga	4
5.	Canada	John Child and Mark Heese	6
5.	United States	Rob Heidger and Kevin Wong	7
5.	Spain	Javier Bosma and Fabio Diez	10
9.	Australia	Julien Prosser and Lee Zahner	1
9.	Brazil	José Loiola and Emanuel Rego	2
9.	Argentina	Martín Conde and Eduardo Martínez	5
9.	Norway	Vegard Høidalen and Jørre Kjemperud	8
9.	Russia	Sergey Ermishin and Mikhail Kouchnerev	14
9.	Austria	Nikolas Berger and Oliver Stamm	17
9.	Canada	Jody Holden and Conrad Leinemann	18
9.	Mexico	Juan Rodríguez Ibarra and Joel Sotelo	24
17.	Czech Republic	Martin Lebl and Michal Palinek	21
17.	Australia	Matthew Grinlaubs and Josh Slack	23
19.	Argentina	Mariano Baracetti and José Salema	11
19.	Norway	Jan Kvalheim and Björn Maaseide	13
19.	Germany	Oliver Oetke and Andreas Scheuerpflug	16
19.	France	Jean-Philippe Jodard and Christian Penigaud	19
19.	Italy	Maurizio Pimponi and Andrea Raffaelli	20
19.	Sweden	Björn Berg and Simon Dahl	11

== See also ==
- Women's Beach Volleyball Tournament
- Volleyball at the Summer Olympics
