= Swatch FIVB World Tour 2003 =

Tournament details
- Host country: Various
- Dates: 11 June – 19 October 2004

The Swatch FIVB World Tour 2003 was the official international beach volleyball tour for 2003.

The USA won five out of the 12 women's tournaments, but Brazil won nine out of the ten men's tournaments.

== Grand Slam ==
There were four Grand Slam tournaments. These events gave a higher number of points and more money than the rest of the tournaments.

- Berlin, Germany – Vodafone Grand Slam, 24–29 June 2003
- Marseille, France – World Series 13 Grand Slam, 15–20 July 2003
- Klagenfurt, Austria – A1 Grand Slam presented by Nokia, 30 July–3 August 2003
- Carson, California, USA – Nissan Grand Slam, 18–21 September 2003

== Schedule ==
Key

World Championships
Grand Slam
Open tournaments

== Tournament results ==
=== Women ===
Tournament	Champions	Runners-up	Third place	Fourth place
Hellas Open; Rhodes, Greece; US$150,000; 11–15 June 2003	Ana Paula Connelly (BRA); Sandra Pires (BRA); 23–21, 21–19, 15–12	Adriana Behar (BRA); Shelda Bede (BRA)	Kerri Walsh Jennings (USA); Misty May-Treanor (USA); 21–15, 25–23	Dalixia Fernandez Grasset (CUB); Tamara Larrea Peraza (CUB)
1to1 Energy Open; Gstaad, Switzerland; US$150,000; 17–21 June 2003	Kerri Walsh Jennings (USA); Misty May-Treanor (USA); 23–21, 21–15	Ana Paula Connelly (BRA); Sandra Pires (BRA)	Adriana Behar (BRA); Shelda Bede (BRA); 21–15, 21–15	Annett Davis (USA); Jenny Johnson Jordan (USA)
Vodafone Grand Slam; Berlin, Germany; US$300,000; 24–28 June 2003	Ana Paula Connelly (BRA); Sandra Pires (BRA); 20–22, 29–27, 15–13	Holly McPeak (USA); Elaine Youngs (USA)	Adriana Behar (BRA); Shelda Bede (BRA); 21–18, 21–19	Kerri Walsh Jennings (USA); Misty May-Treanor (USA)
ConocoPhillips Open; Stavanger, Norway; US$150,000; 4-5 July 2003	Ana Paula Connelly (BRA); Sandra Pires (BRA); 21–19, 21–15	Kerri Walsh Jennings (USA); Misty May-Treanor (USA)	Adriana Behar (BRA); Shelda Bede (BRA); 21–13, 21–17	Holly McPeak (USA); Elaine Youngs (USA)
World Series 13 Grand Slam; Marseille, France; US$270,000; 15–19 July 2003	Kerri Walsh Jennings (USA); Misty May-Treanor (USA); 21–10, 21–13	Ana Paula Connelly (BRA); Sandra Pires (BRA)	Adriana Behar (BRA); Shelda Bede (BRA); 21–14, 21–18	Natalie Cook (AUS); Nicole Sanderson (AUS)
A1 Grand Slam presented by Nokia; Klagenfurt, Austria; US$260,000; July 30-August 2	Kerri Walsh Jennings (USA); Misty May-Treanor (USA); 21–17, 21–12	Ana Paula Connelly (BRA); Sandra Pires (BRA)	Adriana Behar (BRA); Shelda Bede (BRA); 21–17, 21–18	Holly McPeak (USA); Elaine Youngs (USA)
Japan Open; Osaka, Japan; US$150,000; 06–10 August 2003	Ana Paula Connelly (BRA); Sandra Pires (BRA); 21–18, 19–21, 15–13	Adriana Behar (BRA); Shelda Bede (BRA)	Natalie Cook (AUS); Nicole Sanderson (AUS); 18–21, 21–15, 15–10	Tatiana Minello (BRA); Alexandra Fonseca (BRA)
Lianyungang Open; Lianyungang, China; US$150,000; 13–17 August 2003	Rebekka Kadijk (NED); Marrit Leenstra (NED); 21–15, 17–21, 15–13	Susanne Lahme (GER); Danja Müsch (GER)	Natalie Cook (AUS); Nicole Sanderson (AUS); 17–21, 26–24, 18–16	Simone Kuhn (SUI); Nicole Schnyder-Benoit (SUI)
Bali Open; Bali, Indonesia; US$150,000; 20–24 August 2003	Tian Jia (CHN); Wang Fei (CHN); 21–17, 21–19	Dalixia Fernandez Grasset (CUB); Tamara Larrea Peraza (CUB)	Soňa Nováková (CZE); Eva Celbová-Ryšavá (CZE); 21-15, 21–10	Wang Lu (CHN); You Wenhui (CHN)
Estathe' Italian Open; Milan, Italy; US$150,000; 3–7 September 2003	Tian Jia (CHN); Wang Fei (CHN); 17–21, 22–20, 15–10	Adriana Behar (BRA); Shelda Bede (BRA)	Dianne DeNecochea (USA); Nancy Mason Reynolds (USA); 21-16, 21–13	Rebekka Kadijk (NED); Marrit Leenstra (NED)
Nissan Grand Slam; Carson, United States; US$300,000; 18–21 September 2003	Kerri Walsh Jennings (USA); Misty May-Treanor (USA); 22-24, 22–20, 15–13	Ana Paula Connelly (BRA); Sandra Pires (BRA)	Natalie Cook (AUS); Nicole Sanderson (AUS); 21–13, 21–18	Tian Jia (CHN); Wang Fei (CHN)
FIVB World Championships presented by Swatch; Rio de Janeiro, Brazil; US$400,000; 07–12 October 2003	Kerri Walsh Jennings (USA); Misty May-Treanor (USA); 21-19, 21–19	Adriana Behar (BRA); Shelda Bede (BRA)	Natalie Cook (AUS); Nicole Sanderson (AUS); 21–16, 21–17	Annett Davis (USA); Jenny Johnson Jordan (USA)

=== Men ===
Tournament	Champions	Runners-up	Third place	Fourth place
Hellas Open; Rhodes, Greece; US$150,000; 4–8 June 2003	Dain Blanton (USA); Jeff Nygaard (USA); 22-20, 21–18	Márcio Araújo (BRA); Benjamin Insfran (BRA)	Nikolas Berger (AUT); Clemens Doppler (AUT); 21-17, 18–21, 18–16	John Child (CAN); Mark Heese (CAN)
1to1 Energy Open; Gstaad, Switzerland; US$150,000; 18–22 June 2003	Márcio Araújo (BRA); Benjamin Insfran (BRA); 23–25, 21–13, 15–10	Markus Dieckmann (GER); Jonas Reckermann (GER)	Patrick Heuscher (SUI); Stefan Kobel (SUI); 21–18, 19–21, 15–10	Nikolas Berger (AUT); Clemens Doppler (AUT)
Vodafone Grand Slam; Berlin, Germany; US$300,000; 25–29 June 2003	Harley Marques (BRA); Franco Neto (BRA); 21–18, 21–16	Mariano Baracetti (ARG); Martín Conde (ARG)	Emanuel Rego (BRA); Ricardo Santos (BRA); 21–15, 21–16	Markus Dieckmann (GER); Jonas Reckermann (GER)
ConocoPhillips Open; Stavanger, Norway; US$150,000; 2-6 July 2003	Emanuel Rego (BRA); Ricardo Santos (BRA); 16–21, 21–16, 15–12	Mariano Baracetti (ARG); Martín Conde (ARG)	Julien Prosser (AUS); Mark Williams (AUS); 21–18, 22–20, 15–6	Jefferson Bellaguarda (BRA); Dagoberto Dultra Júnior (BRA)
World Series 13 Grand Slam; Marseille, France; US$270,000; 16–20 July 2003	Emanuel Rego (BRA); Ricardo Santos (BRA); 21–18, 20–22, 15–13	Martin Laciga (SUI); Paul Laciga (SUI)	Dain Blanton (USA); Jeff Nygaard (USA); 19-21, 21–15, 15–8	Christoph Dieckmann (GER); Andreas Scheuerpflug (GER)
Portugal Open; Espinho, Portugal; US$150,000; 23–27 July 2003	Emanuel Rego (BRA); Ricardo Santos (BRA); 21-23, 21–14, 20–18	Vegard Høidalen (NOR); Jørre Kjemperud (NOR)	Andrew Schacht (AUS); Joshua Slack (AUS); 21-17, 21–17	Márcio Araújo (BRA); Benjamin Insfran (BRA)
A1 Grand Slam presented by Nokia; Klagenfurt, Austria; US$260,000; July 31-August 3	Márcio Araújo (BRA); Benjamin Insfran (BRA); 22–20, 21–12	Stein Metzger (USA); Kevin Wong (USA)	Patrick Heuscher (SUI); Stefan Kobel (SUI); 19-21, 21–19, 15–8	Dain Blanton (USA); Jeff Nygaard (USA)
World of TUI Open de Mallorca; Mallorca, Spain; US$150,000; 03–7 September 2003	Márcio Araújo (BRA); Benjamin Insfran (BRA); 14-21, 21–19, 34–32	Markus Dieckmann (GER); Jonas Reckermann (GER)	Mariano Baracetti (ARG); Martín Conde (ARG); 22-20, 21–13	Harley Marques (BRA); Franco Neto (BRA)
Nissan Grand Slam; Carson, United States; US$300,000; 18–21 September 2003	Emanuel Rego (BRA); Ricardo Santos (BRA)} 21-11, 21–18	Markus Egger (SUI); Sascha Heyer (SUI)	Canyon Ceman (USA); Mike Whitmarsh (USA); 22-20, 21–16	Nikolas Berger (AUT); Clemens Doppler (AUT)
FIVB World Championships presented by Swatch; Rio de Janeiro, Brazil; US$400,000; 14–19 October 2003	Emanuel Rego (BRA); Ricardo Santos (BRA)} 21-18, 21–15	Dax Holdren (USA); Stein Metzger (USA)	Márcio Araújo (BRA); Benjamin Insfran (BRA); Walkover	João Brenha (POR); Miguel Maia (POR)

== Rankings ==
=== Men ===
Top 15 Rankings as of February 18, 2004.
Rank	Pair	Points
1	(Brazil) Emanuel Rego & Ricardo Santos	3,752
2	(Brazil) Márcio Araújo & Benjamin Insfran	3,236
3	(Switzerland) Martin Laciga & Paul Laciga	2,690
4	(Switzerland) Patrick Heuscher & Stefan Kobel	2,330
5	(Germany) Markus Dieckmann & Jonas Reckermann	2,296
6	(Brazil) Harley Marques & Franco Neto	2,214
7	(Austria) Nikolas Berger & Clemens Doppler	2,158
8	(Norway) Vegard Høidalen & Jørre Kjemperud	2,092
9	(Argentina) Mariano Baracetti & Martín Conde	2,066
10	(Switzerland) Markus Egger & Sascha Heyer	2,032
11	(United States) Dain Blanton & Jeff Nygaard	1,996
12	(Germany) Christoph Dieckmann & Andreas Scheuerpflug	1,702
13	(Portugal) João Brenha & Miguel Maia	1,542
14	(Sweden) Björn Berg & Simon Dahl	1,416
15	(United States) Todd Rogers & Sean Scott	1,384

=== Women ===
Top 15 Rankings as of February 18, 2004.
Rank	Pair	Points	Best Finish
1	(Brazil) Ana Paula Connelly & Sandra Pires	3,864	1st (4 times)
2	(United States) Kerri Walsh Jennings & Misty May-Treanor	3,690	1st (5 times)
3	(Brazil) Adriana Behar & Shelda Bede	3,578	2nd (4 times)
4	(Australia) Natalie Cook & Nicole Sanderson	2,906	3rd (4 times)
5	(China) Tian Jia & Wang Fei	2,388	1st (2 times)
6	(United States) Holly McPeak & Elaine Youngs	2,170	2nd (1 time)
7	(United States) Annett Davis & Jenny Johnson Jordan	2,144	4th (2 times)
8	(Czech Republic) Soňa Nováková & Eva Celbová-Ryšavá	1,976	3rd (1 time)
9	(Netherlands) Rebekka Kadijk & Marrit Leenstra	1,950	1st (1 time)
10	(Germany) Stephanie Pohl & Okka Rau	1,948	5th (3 times)
11	(Switzerland) Simone Kuhn & Nicole Schnyder-Benoit	1,900	4th (1 time)
12	(Brazil) Tatiana Minello & Alexandra Fonseca	1,646	4th (1 time)
13	(United States) Dianne DeNecochea & Nancy Mason Reynolds	1,644	3rd (1 time)
14	(China) Wang Lu & You Wenhui	1,642	4th (1 time)
15	(Germany) Susanne Lahme & Danja Musch	1,572	2nd (1 time)

== Medal table by country ==
Rank	Nation	Gold	Silver	Bronze	Total
1	Brazil	13	9	7	29
2	United States	6	4	4	14
3	China	2	0	0	2
4	Netherlands	1	0	0	1
5	Germany	0	3	0	3
6	Switzerland	0	2	2	4
7	Argentina	0	2	1	3
8	Cuba	0	1	0	1
8	Norway	0	1	0	1
10	Australia	0	0	6	6
11	Austria	0	0	1	1
11	Czech Republic	0	0	1	1
Totals (12 entries)		22	22	22	66
