= Beach volleyball at the Summer Olympics =

- IOC Code: VBV
- Governing body: FIVB
- Events: 2 (men: 1; women: 1)

Summer Olympics
- 1896; 1900; 1904; 1908; 1912; 1920; 1924; 1928; 1932; 1936; 1948; 1952; 1956; 1960; 1964; 1968; 1972; 1976; 1980; 1984; 1988; 1992; 1996; 2000; 2004; 2008; 2012; 2016; 2020; 2024; 2028; 2032
- Medalists

Beach volleyball was introduced at the Summer Olympic Games in the 1992 Games as a demonstration event, and has been an official Olympic sport since 1996.

Winning the Olympics is considered to be the highest honor in international beach volleyball, followed by the World Championships, and the World Tour of the International Volleyball Federation (FIVB) for men and women.

== History ==
=== Origins ===
Beach volleyball was a demonstration sport at the 1992 Summer Olympics in Barcelona, at which Sinjin Smith and Randy Stoklos won the men's tournament, and Karolyn Kirby and Nancy Reno won the women's.

Beach volleyball was introduced as an official Olympic sport in 1996. A total of 24 teams take part in each beach volleyball Olympic tournament. Teams qualify on the basis of their performance in FIVB (Fédération Internationale de Volleyball) events over the course of about 18 months before the Olympic Games. There is a limit of two teams per country, and one spot apiece is reserved for the host country and a randomly chosen wild-card country. In the event that any Olympic region is not represented, the highest ranked team from that continent qualifies for the tournament.

=== Men's beach volleyball ===
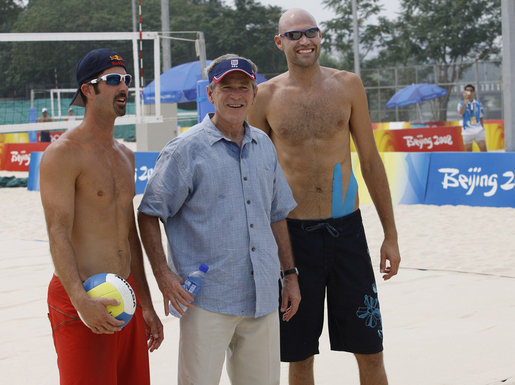
Dalhausser and Rogers celebrate their gold medal win in 2008 with George W. Bush

The men's tournament has had a constant number of teams, with 24 couples in each edition.

In the first tournament, played in the 1996 Olympics, the matches were played at "Atlanta Beach" in Jonesboro, Georgia. The winners of the semifinals played for the gold and silver medals. The losers of the semifinal played for third and fourth places. The final was contested between the Americans Karch Kiraly and Kent Steffes versus Mike Dodd and Mike Whitmarsh. Kiraly is so far the only person with Olympic medals in both indoor and beach volleyball since he had won the gold medal indoors in the tournament of 1984 as well as 1988 in Seoul, South Korea.

The beach volleyball tournament of 2000 was played in Bondi Beach, a suburb of Sydney. The winners were again an American team, Blanton/Fonoimoana, defeating Brazilians Zé Marco/Ricardo (the former had competed in Atlanta) in the finals.

In the 2004 Summer Olympics the tournament was held in the Faliro Coastal Zone Olympic Complex, in Athens, Greece. The Brazilians Emanuel/Ricardo (the former being a veteran of two Olympics, and the latter a silver medalist in 2000) won the gold medal, defeating Bosma and Herrera of Spain.

The beach volleyball tournament of 2008 was carried out at the Beach Volleyball Ground, located in the Chaoyang Park in Beijing. In an upset, reigning champions Emanuel and Ricardo were defeated by their compatriots Márcio Araújo (who competed in Athens) and Fábio Luiz in the semifinal, having to settle for the bronze (where they beat two Brazilians competing for Georgia). The Brazilian victors were then defeated by Americans Rogers and Dalhausser in the final.

The 2012 tournament was played at the Horse Guards Parade in London. Emanuel Rego, now paired with Alison Cerutti, got his third straight medal, completing the three podium colors, by reaching the finals, where he lost to Germans Brink and Reckermann. Mārtiņš Pļaviņš and Jānis Šmēdiņš from Latvia got the bronze.

After 16 years, the 2016 tournament again was held in an actual beach, Copacabana Beach in Rio de Janeiro. Alison Cerutti, now partnered with Bruno Schmidt, returned to the finals, and won the gold beating Daniele Lupo and Paolo Nicolai of Italy in the finals. The Dutch Alexander Brouwer and Robert Meeuwsen completed the podium.

The 2020 Olympics, held in 2021 after a delay caused by the COVID-19 pandemic, had beach volleyball at Shiokaze Park. Norwegians Anders Mol and Christian Sørum won gold, beating in the final Russians Viacheslav Krasilnikov, who had finished 2016 in fourth place, and Oleg Stoyanovskiy. Qataris Cherif Younousse and Ahmed Tijan won the bronze medalist, the first ever by Qatar at beach volleyball at the Olympics. Brazil missed not only the finals but the podium as a whole for the first time since the inaugural tournament, both pairs eliminated by eventual fourth place team Mārtiņš Pļaviņš and Edgars Točs.

The 2024 tournament staged at the Eiffel Tower Stadium in Champ de Mars, had the first medal and gold medal ever to won by the Swedes. David Åhman and Jonatan Hellvig defeated Germans Nils Ehlers and Clemens Wickler in gold medal match, while impending gold medalists Norwegians Anders Mol and Christian Sørum won bronze medal against Qataris Cherif Younousse and Ahmed Tijan.

=== Women's beach volleyball ===
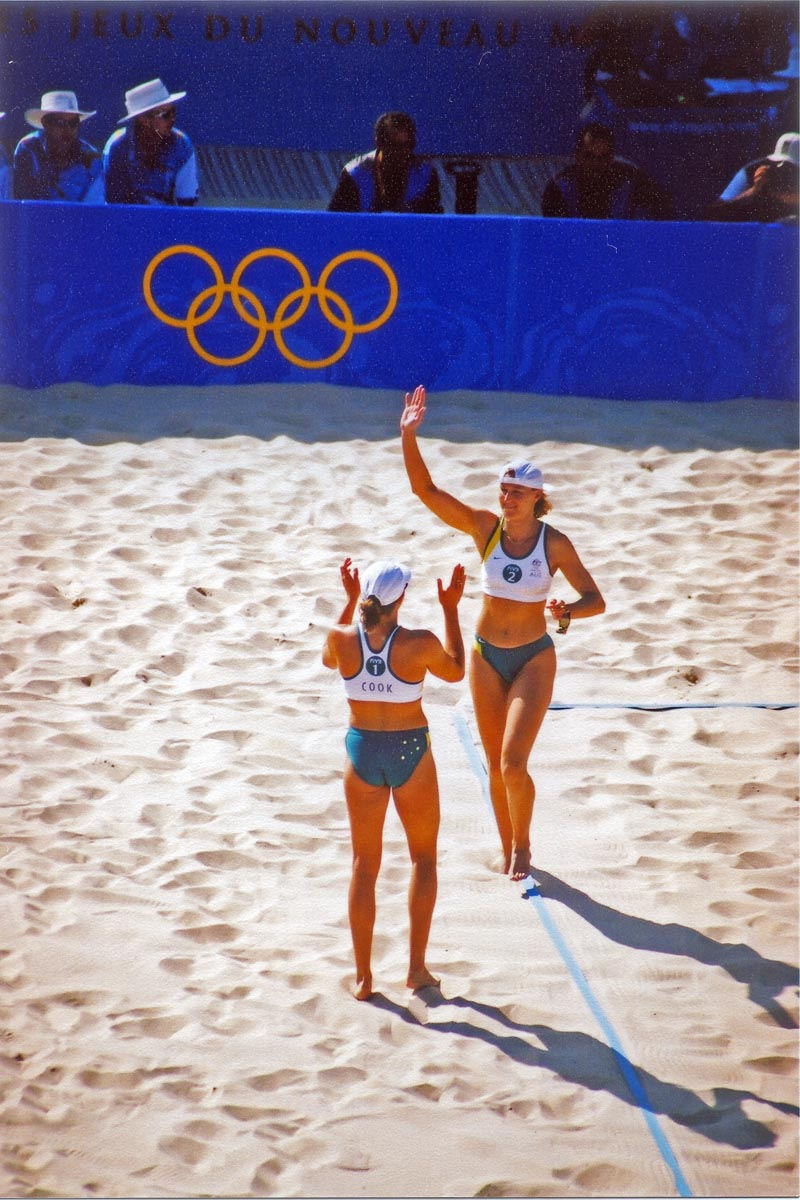
Natalie Cook and Kerri Pottharst at the 2000 tournament.

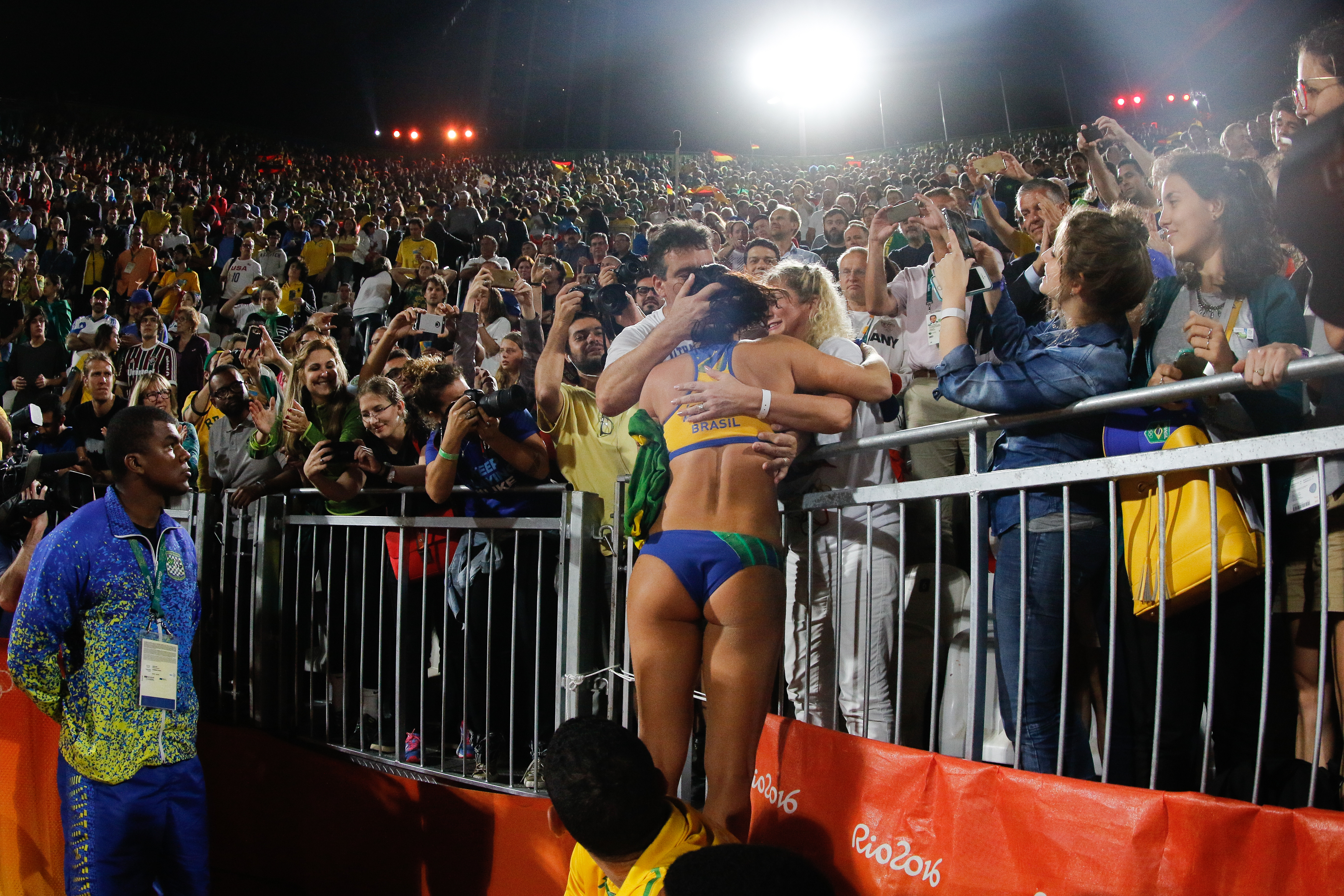
Ágatha Bednarczuk embraces the home crowd after the 2016 final.

In Atlanta, Georgia, in 1996, there were eighteen teams entered, and the championship match was played between two Brazilian teams: Jackie Silva and Sandra Pires versus Mônica Rodrigues and Adriana Samuel. The Australians Natalie Cook and Kerri Pottharst edged out the Americans for the bronze medal.

At the Sydney Olympics of 2000, the number of teams was increased to 24. One of the two Australian teams, Natalie Cook and Kerri Pottharst, won the gold medal over the Brazilians Adriana Behar and Shelda Bede, four years after winning the bronze medal in Atlanta. Another Brazilian team, featuring 1996 champion Sandra Pires and runner-up Adriana Samuel, edged out the Japanese for the bronze medal.

Behar and Bede of Brazil avenged the 2000 defeat by beating Natalie Cook (now partnered with Nicole Sanderson) in the 2004 semifinal to return to the final match, but they were defeated by Misty May-Treanor and Kerri Walsh of the United States. Both May-Treanor and Walsh were veterans of the Sydney Olympics, but Walsh had been part of the American indoor team. Another American team, Holly McPeak and Elaine Youngs (the former in her third tournament, having been fourth in Atlanta), defeated the Australian team for the bronze medal.

In 2008 in China, May-Treanor and Walsh (now going by her married name of Walsh Jennings) were victorious again by defeating the Chinese Tian Jia and Wang Jie in the finals. Another Chinese team, Xue Chen and Zhang Xi won the bronze medal, edging out Brazil in fourth place, and thus sending the Brazilian women home without a medal for the first time in the tournament's history.

In 2012, wearing bikinis stopped being required for women in Olympic beach volleyball, with the women being given the additional options of shorts or leggings and long- or short-sleeved t-shirts. That year in England, May-Treanor and Walsh Jennings won for the third consecutive Olympiad by defeating the other American team of April Ross and Jennifer Kessy in the championship game. Thus the United States finished with the gold and silver medals, with Brazil winning the bronze medal, edging out China in fourth place.

Beginning in 2016, it was decided that "the first referee may authorize [a woman in Olympic beach volleyball] to play with an undershirt and training pants" for religious or cultural reasons. That same year Doaa Elghobashy became the first woman to wear a hijab in Olympic beach volleyball. The 2016 tournament in Brazil had the country return to the beach volleyball final after 12 years, with Ágatha Bednarczuk and Bárbara Seixas winning the semifinal over defending champion Walsh Jennings and London silver medalist April Ross. However, they lost the gold medal to the Germans Laura Ludwig and Kira Walkenhorst, who had also defeated the Brazilians Talita Antunes (4th in 2008) and Larissa França (bronze in 2012) in the semifinals. Talita and Larissa also lost the bronze medal to the United States, making Walsh Jennings the only player to win four beach volleyball Olympic medals. The defeat also broke a streak where every tournament had one country winning medals with both their teams: Brazil in 1996 (gold and silver) and 2000 (silver and bronze), United States in 2004 (gold and bronze) and 2012 (gold and silver), and China in 2008 (silver and bronze). There were also four teams tied for fifth place: Australia, Canada, Russia, and Switzerland, and hence seven countries were represented in the top eight teams.

The 2020 tournament in Japan had April Ross, now partnered with Alix Klineman, winning the gold in her third try, beating in the finals Australians Taliqua Clancy and Mariafe Artacho del Solar. Joana Heidrich and Anouk Vergé-Dépré of Switzerland, who had played in separate doubles in Rio, got the bronze. Brazil for the first time missed the semifinals, with at most a pair eliminated in the quarterfinals by the Swiss.

The 2024 tournament in Paris had Brazilian women winning gold medal again after 28 years of their first title. Ana Patrícia Ramos and Duda Lisboa defeated Canadians Melissa Humana-Paredes and Brandie Wilkerson in the gold medal match. The bronze medal was conquered by Swiss Nina Betschart and Tanja Hüberli. The 2024 tournament marked the first time ever that United States failed to win an Olympic medal in both men's and women's beach volleyball tournaments.

While thirteen countries won medals in the male tournament, only seven have done so with women. The dominating nations are Brazil and the US. Americans have the most gold medals with four. The only countries outside the seven medalists (Brazil, United States, Australia, China, Germany, Canada and Switzerland) to reach the semifinals were Japan in 2000 and Latvia in 2020.

== Competition formula ==
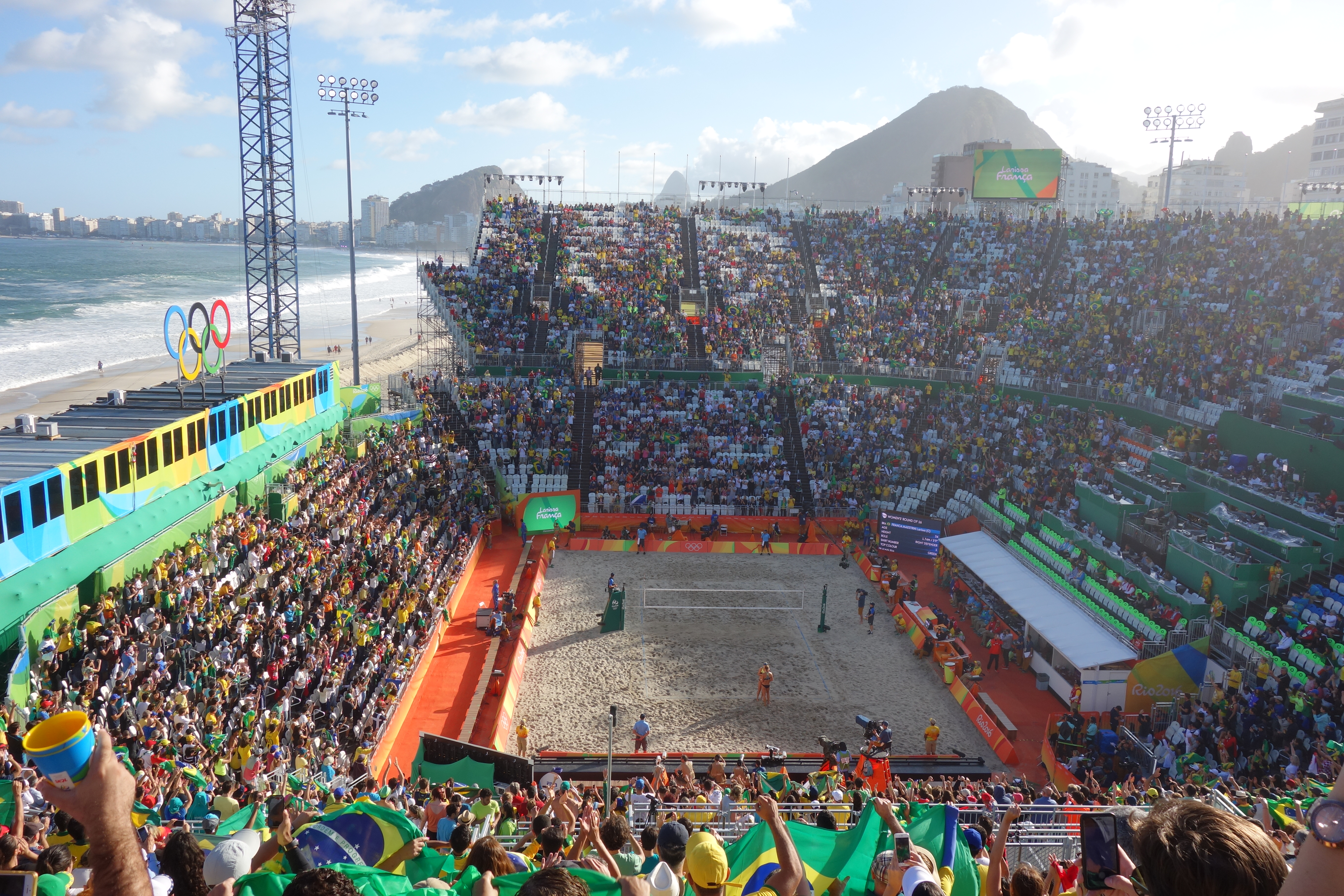
Olympics 2016 tournament

=== 1996 ===
A double-elimination tournament was played for both men and women until a total of four teams qualified for the semifinals: the two finalist teams of the winners bracket and the two finalist teams of the elimination bracket. The men's field had 24 teams, and the women's field had 16.

Competitors were selected through a detailed Olympic qualification process which saw the participation of a total of 587 men's and women's athletes from 46 countries. Each country could qualify up to two teams - host country United States had two spots already guaranteed, with the doubles selected through Olympic Beach Trials held in Baltimore, Maryland.

=== 2000 ===
Following an expansion on the women's tournament, both competitions had 24 teams. The format became single elimination, preceded by a preliminary round to define the round of 16 teams - the twelve winners of the preliminary games automatically qualified, while the twelve defeated teams played two elimination rounds to get the remaining four spots.

The teams qualify by accumulating points in FIVB Olympic Qualification Tournaments, with one of the host nation having a guaranteed berth and another having the possibility of qualifying through the ranking.

=== 2004 ===
Following a FIVB change of rules in 2001, the scoring was changed from sets of 15 points in a superseded sideout system to sets of 21 points in a rally point system.

The format had the 24 competing teams were split equally into six pools of four. The top two teams from each pool and the four best third placed teams progressed through to a single-elimination tournament of sixteen teams.

The qualifying added a continental quota - in the event of an unrepresented continent, the top team from that continent earned a spot.

=== 2008–2024 ===
The six pools of four format was retained, but the qualifying for third-placed teams was changed. Of the six 3rd place teams, two were directly qualified to the playoffs. Of the four remaining third placed teams, another two teams get to the playoffs through winning a lucky loser (repechage) match.

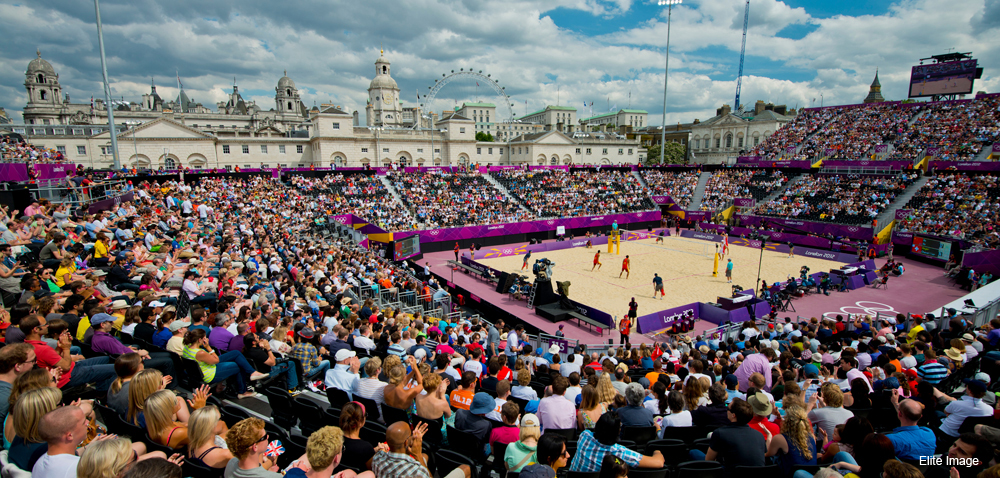
The Horse Guards Parade hosted the 2012 tournament.

== Men's tournament ==
=== Results summary ===
Year	Host	Gold medal match			Bronze medal match			Teams
Year	Host	Gold medalists	Score	Silver medalists	Bronze medalists	Score	4th place	Teams
1996; Details	(United States); Atlanta	(United States); Karch Kiraly and Kent Steffes	2–0	(United States); Mike Dodd and Mike Whitmarsh	(Canada); John Child and Mark Heese	2–0	(Portugal); João Brenha and Miguel Maia	24
2000; Details	(Australia); Sydney	(United States); Dain Blanton and Eric Fonoimoana	2–0	(Brazil); Zé Marco de Melo and Ricardo Santos	(Germany); Jörg Ahmann and Axel Hager	2–0	(Portugal); João Brenha and Miguel Maia	24
2004; Details	(Greece); Athens	(Brazil); Emanuel Rego and Ricardo Santos	2–0	(Spain); Javier Bosma and Pablo Herrera	(Switzerland); Patrick Heuscher and Stefan Kobel	2–1	(Australia); Julien Prosser and Mark Williams	24
2008; Details	(China); Beijing	(United States); Phil Dalhausser and Todd Rogers	2–1	(Brazil); Márcio Araújo and Fábio Luiz Magalhães	(Brazil); Emanuel Rego and Ricardo Santos	2–0	(Georgia (country)); Renato "Geor" Gomes and Jorge "Gia" Terceiro	24
2012; Details	(United Kingdom); London	(Germany); Julius Brink and Jonas Reckermann	2–1	(Brazil); Alison Cerutti and Emanuel Rego	(Latvia); Mārtiņš Pļaviņš and Jānis Šmēdiņš	2–1	(Netherlands); Reinder Nummerdor and Richard Schuil	24
2016; Details	(Brazil); Rio de Janeiro	(Brazil); Alison Cerutti and Bruno Oscar Schmidt	2–0	(Italy); Daniele Lupo and Paolo Nicolai	(Netherlands); Alexander Brouwer and Robert Meeuwsen	2–0	(Russia); Viacheslav Krasilnikov and Konstantin Semenov	24
2020; Details	(Japan); Tokyo	(Norway); Anders Mol and Christian Sørum	2–0	(Russia); Viacheslav Krasilnikov and Oleg Stoyanovskiy	(Qatar); Ahmed Tijan and Cherif Younousse	2–0	(Latvia); Mārtiņš Pļaviņš and Edgars Točs	24
2024; Details	(France); Paris	(Sweden); David Åhman and Jonatan Hellvig	2–0	(Germany); Nils Ehlers and Clemens Wickler	(Norway); Anders Mol and Christian Sørum	2–0	(Qatar); Ahmed Tijan and Cherif Younousse	24
2028; Details	(United States); Los Angeles							24

=== Participating nations ===
Legend

- 1st – Champions
- 2nd – Runners-up
- 3rd – Third place
- 4th – Fourth place
- • – Did not enter / Did not qualify
- – Hosts
- = – More than one team tied for that rank
- Q – Qualified for forthcoming tournament
- X - banned or suspended

Nation	(United States); 1996 (24)	(Australia); 2000 (24)	(Greece); 2004 (24)	(China); 2008 (24)	(United Kingdom); 2012 (24)	(Brazil); 2016 (24)	(Japan); 2020 (24)	(France); 2024 (24)	(United States); 2028 (24)	Years
Angola	•	•	•	19th	•	•	•	•		1
Argentina	14th	9th	9th	19th	•	•	19th	•		5
Argentina	•	19th	•	•	•	•	•	•		5
Australia	9th	9th	4th	9th	•	•	19th	17th		6
Australia	•	17th	9th	•	•	•	•	19th		6
Austria	•	9th	17th	5th	19th	9th	•	19th		6
Austria	•	•	19th	9th	•	9th	•	•		6
Brazil	9th	2nd	1st	2nd	2nd	1st	5th	5th		8
Brazil	9th	9th	9th	3rd	5th	9th	9th	9th		8
Canada	3rd	5th	5th	•	17th	9th	•	17th		6
Canada	17th	9th	•	•	•	19th	•	•		6
Chile	•	•	•	•	•	19th	9th	9th		3
China	•	•	•	9th	19th	•	•	•		2
Cuba	7th	•	17th	•	•	5th	•	9th		4
Czech Republic	14th	17th	•	•	17th	•	19th	9th		5
Estonia	17th	•	•	19th	•	•	•	•		2
France	14th	19th	19th	•	•	•	•	19th		4
France	•	•	•	•	•	•	•	19th		4
Georgia	•	•	•	4th	•	•	•	•		1
Germany	9th	3rd	5th	5th	1st	19th	5th	2nd		8
Germany	•	19th	9th	19th	9th	•	•	•		8
Great Britain	•	•	•	•	19th	•	•	•		1
Greece	•	•	19th	•	•	•	•	•		1
Indonesia	17th	•	•	•	•	•	•	•		1
Italy	14th	19th	•	19th	5th	2nd	5th	9th		7
Italy	•	•	•	•	•	9th	19th	19th		7
Japan	17th	•	•	9th	19th	•	19th	•		4
Latvia	•	•	•	9th	3rd	19th	4th	•		4
Latvia	•	•	•	•	9th	•	•	•		4
Mexico	•	9th	•	•	•	9th	9th	•		3
Morocco	•	•	•	•	•	•	19th	19th	Q	3
Netherlands	17th	•	•	5th	4th	3rd	9th	5th		6
Netherlands	•	•	•	17th	•	5th	•	9th		6
New Zealand	17th	•	•	•	•	•	•	•		1
Norway	7th	9th	9th	19th	9th	•	1st	3rd		7
Norway	•	19th	19th	•	•	•	•	•		7
Poland	•	•	•	•	5th	17th	9th	9th		4
Portugal	4th	4th	9th	•	•	•	•	•		3
Puerto Rico	•	•	19th	•	•	•	•	•		1
Qatar	•	•	•	•	•	9th	3rd	4th		3
Russia	•	9th	•	9th	9th	4th	2nd	No		5 (Note: Russia's total includes one appearance as Russian Olympic Committee in 2020.)
Russia	•	•	•	•	•	5th	5th	No		5
South Africa	•	•	9th	•	19th	•	•	•		2
Spain	5th	5th	2nd	9th	9th	9th	9th	5th		8
Spain	17th	•	•	•	•	•	•	•		8
Sweden	17th	19th	9th	•	•	•	•	1st	Q	5
Switzerland	•	5th	3rd	9th	9th	•	17th	•		5
Switzerland	•	•	5th	17th	9th	•	•	•		5
Tunisia	•	•	•	•	•	19th	•	•		1
United States	1st	1st	5th	1st	5th	5th	9th	5th	Q	9
United States	2nd	5th	19th	5th	8th	19th	9th	9th		9
United States	5th	•	•	•	•	•	•	•		9
Venezuela	•	•	•	•	19h	•	•	•		1
Total nations	19	17	17	18	19	16	19	18		37

== Women's tournament ==
=== Results summary ===
Year	Host	Gold medal match			Bronze medal match			Teams
Year	Host	Gold medalists	Score	Silver medalists	Bronze medalists	Score	4th place	Teams
1996; Details	(United States); Atlanta	(Brazil); Sandra Pires and Jackie Silva	2–0	(Brazil); Mônica Rodrigues and Adriana Samuel	(Australia); Natalie Cook and Kerri Pottharst	2–0	(United States); Barbra Fontana and Linda Hanley	18
2000; Details	(Australia); Sydney	(Australia); Natalie Cook and Kerri Pottharst	2–0	(Brazil); Shelda Bede and Adriana Behar	(Brazil); Sandra Pires and Adriana Samuel	2–0	(Japan); Yukiko Takahashi and Mika Teru Saiki	24
2004; Details	(Greece); Athens	(United States); Misty May and Kerri Walsh Jennings	2–0	(Brazil); Shelda Bede and Adriana Behar	(United States); Holly McPeak and Elaine Youngs	2–1	(Australia); Natalie Cook and Nicole Sanderson	24
2008; Details	(China); Beijing	(United States); Misty May-Treanor and Kerri Walsh Jennings	2–0	(China); Tian Jia and Wang Jie	(China); Xue Chen and Zhang Xi	2–0	(Brazil); Talita Antunes and Renata Ribeiro	24
2012; Details	(United Kingdom); London	(United States); Misty May-Treanor and Kerri Walsh Jennings	2–0	(United States); Jennifer Kessy and April Ross	(Brazil); Larissa França and Juliana Silva	2–1	(China); Xue Chen and Zhang Xi	24
2016; Details	(Brazil); Rio de Janeiro	(Germany); Laura Ludwig and Kira Walkenhorst	2–0	(Brazil); Ágatha Bednarczuk and Bárbara Seixas	(United States); April Ross and Kerri Walsh Jennings	2–1	(Brazil); Talita Antunes and Larissa França	24
2020; Details	(Japan); Tokyo	(United States); Alix Klineman and April Ross	2–0	(Australia); Mariafe Artacho del Solar and Taliqua Clancy	(Switzerland); Joana Heidrich and Anouk Vergé-Dépré	2–0	(Latvia); Tīna Graudiņa and Anastasija Kravčenoka	24
2024; Details	(France); Paris	(Brazil); Ana Patrícia Ramos and Duda Lisboa	2–1	(Canada); Melissa Humana-Paredes and Brandie Wilkerson	(Switzerland); Nina Brunner and Tanja Hüberli	2–0	(Australia); Mariafe Artacho del Solar and Taliqua Clancy	24
2028; Details	(United States); Los Angeles							24

=== Participating nations ===
Legend

- 1st – Champions
- 2nd – Runners-up
- 3rd – Third place
- 4th – Fourth place
- • – Did not enter / Did not qualify
- – Hosts
- = – More than one team tied for that rank
- Q – Qualified for forthcoming tournament

Nation	(United States); 1996 (18)	(Australia); 2000 (24)	(Greece); 2004 (24)	(China); 2008 (24)	(United Kingdom); 2012 (24)	(Brazil); 2016 (24)	(Japan); 2020 (24)	(France); 2024 (24)	(United States); 2028 (24)	Years
Argentina	•	•	•	•	19th	19th	19th	•		3
Australia	3rd	1st	4th	5th	19th	5th	2nd	4th		8
Australia	7th	5th	9th	•	19th	19th	•	•		8
Australia	•	17th	•	•	•	•	•	•		8
Austria	•	•	•	5th	5th	•	•	•		2
Belgium	•	•	•	9th	•	•	•	•		1
Brazil	1st	2nd	2nd	4th	3rd	2nd	5th	1st		8
Brazil	2nd	3rd	5th	5th	9th	4th	9th	9th		8
Bulgaria	•	17th	9th	•	•	•	•	•		2
Canada	17th	•	5th	•	19th	5th	5th	2nd		6
Canada	•	•	•	•	•	9th	5th	19th		6
China	•	9th	9th	2nd	4th	9th	9th	9th		7
China	•	17th	19th	3rd	•	•	9th	•		7
Costa Rica	•	•	•	•	•	19th	•	•		1
Cuba	•	9th	9th	9th	•	•	9th	•		4
Cuba	•	•	•	9th	•	•	•	•		4
Czech Republic	•	9th	9th	•	5th	17th	19th	17th		6
Czech Republic	•	17th	•	•	17th	•	•	•		6
Egypt	•	•	•	•	•	19th	•	19th		2
France	13th	9th	•	•	•	•	•	17th		3
France	•	•	•	•	•	•	•	19th		3
Georgia	•	•	•	17th	•	•	•	•		1
Germany	7th	9th	5th	9th	5th	1st	19th	9th		8
Germany	•	9th	9th	9th	9th	9th	5th	19th		8
Great Britain	9th	•	•	•	17th	•	•	•		2
Greece	•	17th	9th	9th	19th	•	•	•		4
Greece	•	•	9th	19th	•	•	•	•		4
Indonesia	13th	•	•	•	•	•	•	•		1
Italy	13th	5th	5th	•	5th	9th	19th	9th		7
Italy	•	9th	•	•	•	•	•	•		7
Japan	5th	4th	17th	19th	•	•	17th	9th		6
Japan	9th	17th	•	•	•	•	•	•		6
Kenya	•	•	•	•	•	•	19th	•		1
Latvia	•	•	•	•	•	•	4th	5th		2
Lithuania	•	•	•	•	•	•	•	19th		1
Mauritius	•	•	•	•	19th	•	•	•		1
Mexico	17th	17th	19th	17th	•	•	•	•		4
Netherlands	13th	17th	19th	19th	9th	9th	17th	9th	Q	9
Netherlands	•	•	•	•	9th	19th	19th	•		9
Nigeria	•	•	•	•	•	•	•	•	Q	1
Norway	9th	•	17th	9th	•	•	•	•		3
Norway	•	•	19th	9th	•	•	•	•		3
Paraguay	•	•	•	•	•	•	•	19th		1
Poland	•	•	•	•	•	9th	•	•		1
Portugal	•	9th	•	•	•	•	•	•		1
Russia	•	•	•	19th	9th	5th	9th	•		4
Russia	•	•	•	•	9th	•	•	•		4
South Africa	•	•	19th	19th	•	•	•	•		2
Spain	•	•	•	•	9th	9th	9th	5th		4
Spain	•	•	•	•	•	•	•	9th		4
Switzerland	•	•	19th	19th	9th	5th	3rd	3rd		6
Switzerland	•	•	•	•	•	9th	9th	5th		6
United States	4th	5th	1st	1st	1st	3rd	1st	5th	Q	9
United States	5th	5th	3rd	5th	2nd	19th	9th	9th		9
United States	9th	•	•	•	•	•	•	•		9
Venezuela	•	•	•	•	•	17th	•	•		1
Total	13	15	17	17	17	17	17	17		36

== Medal table ==
Updated after the 2024 Summer Olympics.

=== Total ===
Rank	Nation	Gold	Silver	Bronze	Total
1	United States	7	2	2	11
2	Brazil	4	7	3	14
3	Germany	2	1	1	4
4	Australia	1	1	1	3
5	Norway	1	0	1	2
6	Sweden	1	0	0	1
7	Canada	0	1	1	2
7	China	0	1	1	2
9	Italy	0	1	0	1
9	ROC (ROC)	0	1	0	1
9	Spain	0	1	0	1
12	Switzerland	0	0	3	3
13	Latvia	0	0	1	1
13	Netherlands	0	0	1	1
13	Qatar	0	0	1	1
Totals (15 entries)		16	16	16	48

=== Medal table, men ===
Rank	Nation	Gold	Silver	Bronze	Total
1	United States	3	1	0	4
2	Brazil	2	3	1	6
3	Germany	1	1	1	3
4	Norway	1	0	1	2
5	Sweden	1	0	0	1
6	Italy	0	1	0	1
6	ROC (ROC)	0	1	0	1
6	Spain	0	1	0	1
9	Canada	0	0	1	1
9	Latvia	0	0	1	1
9	Netherlands	0	0	1	1
9	Qatar	0	0	1	1
9	Switzerland	0	0	1	1
Totals (13 entries)		8	8	8	24

=== Medal table, women ===
Rank	Nation	Gold	Silver	Bronze	Total
1	United States	4	1	2	7
2	Brazil	2	4	2	8
3	Australia	1	1	1	3
4	Germany	1	0	0	1
5	China	0	1	1	2
6	Canada	0	1	0	1
7	Switzerland	0	0	2	2
Totals (7 entries)		8	8	8	24

== See also ==
- Volleyball at the Summer Olympics
- List of Olympic venues in beach volleyball
