= USA Volleyball =

Sports governing body

- Logo of USA Volleyball
- Sport: Volleyball
- Abbreviation: USAV
- Affiliation: FIVB
- Regional affiliation: NORCECA
- Headquarters: Colorado Springs, Colorado, U.S.
- President: John Speraw

USA Volleyball (USAV) is a non-profit organization which is recognized as the national governing body of volleyball in the United States by the Fédération Internationale de Volleyball (FIVB) and the United States Olympic & Paralympic Committee (USOPC). It is headquartered in Colorado Springs, Colorado, and was founded by the YMCA of the USA. The organization is responsible for selecting and supporting US national teams that compete in FIVB-sanctioned international volleyball and beach volleyball competitions such as the Olympic Summer Games. USA Volleyball is also charged with fostering the development of the sport of volleyball within the United States through involvement with its forty Regional Volleyball Associations (RVAs).

USA Volleyball was previously known as United States Volleyball Association (USVBA).

== Publications ==
Volleyball USA is the official magazine of USA Volleyball. Published four times a year, the magazine provides information regarding the national teams, youth programs, beach volleyball, and regional activities.

The USA Volleyball Domestic Competition Regulations (DCR), formerly published annually, is now published on a two-year cycle as of the 2009 season. The DCR is based on FIVB rules for both indoor and beach volleyball, while incorporating modifications for domestic play in the United States. Other sections of the DCR include refereeing techniques, scorekeeping instructions, and tournament guidelines.

== Olympic results ==
Indoor volleyball
Year	U.S. Women's Indoor Finishes	U.S. Men's Indoor Finishes
1964	5th	9th
1968	8th	7th
1972	did not qualify	did not qualify
1976	did not qualify	did not qualify
1980	did not compete (Olympic boycott)	did not compete (Olympic boycott)
1984	(silver) Silver	(gold) Gold
1988	7th	(gold) Gold
1992	(bronze) Bronze	(bronze) Bronze
1996	7th	9th
2000	4th	11th
2004	5th	4th
2008	(silver) Silver	(gold) Gold
2012	(silver) Silver	5th
2016	(bronze) Bronze	(bronze) Bronze
2020	(gold) Gold	10th
2024	(silver) Silver	(bronze) Bronze

Beach volleyball
Year	U.S. Women's Beach Finishes	U.S. Men's Beach Finishes
1996	did not medal	(gold) Gold (Karch Kiraly and Kent Steffes); Silver (Mike Dodd and Mike Whitmarsh)
2000	did not medal	(gold) Gold (Dain Blanton and Eric Fonoimoana)
2004	(gold) Gold (Misty May-Treanor and Kerri Walsh)	did not medal
2008	(gold) Gold (Misty May-Treanor and Kerri Walsh)	(gold) Gold (Phil Dalhausser and Todd Rogers)
2012	(gold) Gold (Misty May-Treanor and Kerri Walsh); Silver (April Ross and Jennifer Kessy)	did not medal
2016	(bronze) Bronze (April Ross and Kerri Walsh-Jennings)	did not medal
2020	(gold) Gold (April Ross and Alix Klineman)	did not medal
2024	did not medal	did not medal

== FIVB World Championship results ==
FIVB Women's and Men's World Championships
Year	U.S. Women's Indoor Finishes	U.S. Men's Indoor Finishes
1949	not held	did not compete
1952	did not compete	did not compete
1956	9th	6th
1960	6th	7th
1962	did not compete	did not compete
1966	(silver) Silver (1967)	11th
1970	11th	18th
1974	12th	14th
1978	5th	19th
1982	(bronze) Bronze	13th
1986	10th	(gold) Gold
1990	(bronze) Bronze	13th
1994	6th	(bronze) Bronze
1998	16th	9th
2002	(silver) Silver	9th
2006	9th	10th
2010	4th	6th
2014	(gold) Gold	7th
2018	5th	(bronze) Bronze
2022	4th	6th
2025	5th	TBA

FIVB Beach Volleyball World Championships
Year	U.S. Women's Beach Finishes	U.S. Men's Beach Finishes
1997	(silver) Silver (Lisa Arce and Holly McPeak); (bronze) Bronze (Karolyn Kirby and Nancy Reno)	(silver) Silver (Canyon Ceman and Mike Whitmarsh); (bronze) Bronze (Dain Blanton and Kent Steffes)
1999	(silver) Silver (Annett Davis and Jenny Johnson Jordan); (bronze) Bronze (Liz Masakayan and Elaine Youngs)	did not compete
2001	did not compete	did not compete
2003	(gold) Gold (Misty May-Treanor and Kerri Walsh)	(silver) Silver (Dax Holdren and Stein Metzger)
2005	(gold) Gold (Misty May-Treanor and Kerri Walsh)	did not compete
2007	(gold) Gold (Misty May-Treanor and Kerri Walsh)	(gold) Gold (Phil Dalhausser and Todd Rogers)
2009	(gold) Gold (Jennifer Kessy and April Ross)	(bronze) Bronze (Phil Dalhausser and Todd Rogers)
2011	(silver) Silver (Misty May-Treanor and Kerri Walsh)	did not compete
2013	did not compete	did not compete
2015	did not compete	did not compete
2017	(silver) Silver (Lauren Fendrick and April Ross)	did not compete
2019	(silver) Silver (Alix Klineman and April Ross)	did not compete
2022	did not compete	did not compete
2023	(gold) Gold (Sara Hughes and Kelly Cheng); (bronze) Bronze (Kristen Nuss and Taryn Kloth)	did not compete

== USA Volleyball regions ==
There are forty regions of organized competition for adults and juniors in the United States. These regions are grouped into four zones and eight sections. Each region has its own bylaws but are required to follow the national standards and practices.

- Central Zone
  - Central East Section
    - Badger Region (BG) – Wisconsin
    - Great Lakes Region (GL) – Most of Illinois
    - Gateway Region (GW) – Southern Illinois and eastern Missouri
    - Lakeshore Region (LK) – Michigan except the Upper Peninsula
    - North Country Region (NO) – Minnesota, North Dakota, South Dakota, and the Upper Peninsula of Michigan
    - Hoosier Region (HO) – Indiana
    - Pioneer Region (PR) – Kentucky
  - Central West Section
    - Great Plains Region (GP) – Nebraska
    - Heart of America Region (HA) – Kansas, Western Missouri
    - Iowa Region (IA) – Iowa
    - Rocky Mountain Region (RM) – Colorado and Wyoming
- Pacific Zone
  - Pacific Zone North
    - Alaska Region (AK) – Alaska
    - Columbia Empire Region (CE) – Representing Oregon and a small southern part of Washington
    - Evergreen Region (EV) – Eastern Washington, northern Idaho and Montana
    - Puget Sound Region (PS) – Western Washington
  - Pacific Zone South
    - Aloha Region (AH) – Hawaii
    - Intermountain Region (IM) – Utah and Southern Idaho
    - Moku O Keawe Region (MK) – Hawaii
    - Northern California Region (NC) – Northern California and Nevada, except Las Vegas
- Atlantic Zone
  - North Atlantic Section
    - Chesapeake Region (CH) – Most of Maryland, Delaware, Washington D.C. and Northern Virginia
    - GEVA (Garden Empire Volleyball Association) – New Jersey, New York City, Long Island, Westchester & Rockland Counties, and a small portion of western Connecticut
    - Excelsior (XL) – Northeast New York State
    - Keystone Region (KE) – Pennsylvania except the westernmost portion
    - New England Region (NE) – Maine, Vermont, New Hampshire, Massachusetts, Most of Connecticut, and Rhode Island
    - Ohio Valley Region (OV)- Ohio and the western bordering counties of Pennsylvania and West Virginia
    - Western Empire Region (WE) – Western New York State
  - South Atlantic Section
    - Carolina Region (CR) – North Carolina
    - Florida Region (FL) – Most of Florida (Excluding the panhandle)
    - Old Dominion Region (OD) – Virginia except northern (near D.C.)
    - Palmetto Region (PM) – South Carolina
    - Southern Region (SO) – Georgia, Alabama and most of Tennessee
- Border Zone
  - Border East Section
    - Bayou Region (BY) – Southern Louisiana
    - Delta Region (DE) – Arkansas, Northern Louisiana, Mississippi, and western Tennessee
    - Gulf Coast Region (GC) – Southern Alabama, Southern Mississippi, and the Florida panhandle
    - Lone Star Region (LS) – Southern Texas
    - North Texas Region (NT) – Northern Texas
    - Oklahoma Region (OK) – Oklahoma
  - Border West Section
    - Arizona Region (AZ) – Arizona
    - Southern California Region (SC) – Southern California, and Las Vegas
    - Sun Country Region (SU) – West Texas and New Mexico

== See also ==
- United States men's national volleyball team
- United States women's national volleyball team
- United States national beach volleyball team
