= Beach volleyball at the 1996 Summer Olympics – Men's tournament =

Men's beach volleyball at the Games of the XXVI Olympiad
- Venue: Clayton County International Park
- Dates: July 23–28
- Competitors: 48 from 19 nations

Medalists
1st place, gold medalist(s)		Karch Kiraly; Kent Steffes	United States
2nd place, silver medalist(s)		Mike Dodd; Mike Whitmarsh	United States
3rd place, bronze medalist(s)		John Child; Mark Heese	Canada

These page shows the results of the inaugural Men's Beach Volleyball Tournament at the 1996 Summer Olympics in Atlanta. The Olympic Beach Volleyball competition took place in Atlanta Beach from July 23 to July 28 in a 10.000-seat stadium.

== Results ==
=== Winner's Bracket, First-round ===
- Palinek/Pakosta, Czech Republic (16) def. Yuste/Prieto, Spain (17), 15-11 (27 minutes)
- Bosma/Jimenez, Spain (9) def. Nurmufid/Markoji, Indonesia (24), 15-7 (41)
- Penigaud/Jodard, France (12) def. Keel/Kreen, Estonia (21), 15-8 (48)
- Prosser/Zahner, Australia (13) def. Drakich/Dunn, Canada (20), 15-6 (35)
- Ghiurghi/Grigolo, Italy (14) def. Hamilton/Hamilton, New Zealand (19), 15-8 (39)
- Ahmann/Hager, Germany (11) def. Takao/Setoyama, Japan (22), 15-8 (51)
- Alvarez/Rosell, Cuba (10) def. Englen/Petersson, Sweden (23), 15-3 (29)
- Maia/Brenha, Portugal (18) def. Everaert/Mulder, Netherlands (15), 15-8 (51)

=== Winner's Bracket, Second-round ===
- Roberto Lopes/Franco, Brazil (1) def. Palinek/Pakosta, Czech Republic (16), 15-5 (34)
- Bosma/Jimenez, Spain (9) def. Child/Heese, Canada (8), 15-1 (31)
- Zé Marco/Emanuel, Brazil (5) def. Penigaud/Jodard, France (12), 15-1 (27)
- Dodd/Whitmarsh, United States (4) def. Prosser/Zahner, Australia (13), 15-10 (49)
- Kiraly/Steffes, United States (3) def. Ghiurghi/Grigolo, Italy (14), 15-7 (36)
- Ahmann/Hager, Germany (11) def. Kvalheim/Maaseide, Norway (6), 17-16 (67)
- Alvarez/Rosell, Cuba (10) def. Conde/Martinez, Argentina (7), 15-11 (41)
- Smith/Henkel, United States (2) def. Maia/Brenha, Portugal (18), 15-7 (36)

=== Winner's Bracket, Third-round ===
- Bosma/Jimenez, Spain (9) def. Roberto Lopes/Franco, Brazil (1), 15-9 (71)
- Dodd-Whitmarsh, United States (4) def. Zé Marco/Emanuel, Brazil (5), 15-9 (44)
- Kiraly/Steffes, United States (3) def. Ahmann/Hager, Germany (11), 15-5 (32)
- Smith/Henkel, United States (2) def. Alvarez/Rosell, Cuba (10), 15-13 (52)

=== Winner's Bracket, Fourth-round ===
- Dodd/Whitmarsh, United States (4) def. Bosma/Jimenez, Spain (9), 15-6 (30)
- Kiraly/Steffes, United States (3) def. Smith/Henkel, United States (2), 17-15 (54)

=== Loser's Bracket, First-round (losers eliminated, place 17th) ===
- Palinek/Pakosta, Czech Republic (16) def. Everaert/Mulder, Netherlands (15), 15-6 (35)
- Child/Heese, Canada (8) def. Englen/Petersson, Sweden (23), 15-2 (28)
- Penigaud/Jodard, France (12) def. Takao/Setoyama, Japan (22), 15-12 (47)
- Prosser/Zahner, Australia (13) def. Hamilton/Hamilton New Zealand (19), 15-8 (38)
- Ghiurghi/Grigolo, Italy (14) def. Drakich/Dunn, Canada (20), 15-8 (45)
- Kvalheim/Maaseide, Norway (6) def. Keel/Kreen, Estonia (21), 15-2 (31)
- Conde/Martinez, Argentina (7) def. Nurmufid/Markoji, Indonesia (24), 15-5 (35)
- Maia/Brenha, Portugal (18) def. Yuste/Prieto, Spain (17), 15-8 (49)

=== Loser's Bracket, Second-round (losers eliminated, place 13th) ===
- Maia/Brenha, Porgtual (18) def. Conde/Martinez, Argentina (7), 15-5 (35)
- Kvalheim/Maaseide, Norway (6) def. Ghiurghi/Grigolo, Italy (14), 15-11 (43)
- Prosser/Zahner, Australia (13) def. Penigaud/Jodard, France (12), 15-13 (52)
- Child/Heese, Canada (8) def. Palinek/Pakosta, Czech Republic (16), 15-9 (46)

=== Loser's Bracket, Third-round (losers eliminated, place ninth) ===
- Maia/Brenha, Portugal (18) def. Zé Marco/Emanuel, Brazil (5), 15-12 (54)
- Kvalheim/Maaseide, Norway (6) def. Franco/Roberto Lopes, Brazil (1), 15-10 (51)
- Alvarez/Rosell, Cuba (10) def. Prosser/Zahner, Australia (13), 15-6 (35)
- Child/Heese, Canada (8) def. Ahmann/Hager, Germany (11), 15-7 (42)

=== Loser's Bracket, Fourth-round (losers eliminated, place seventh) ===
- Maia/Brenha, Portugal (18) def. Kvalheim/Maaseide, Norway (6), 15-3 (28)
- Child/Heese, Canada (8) def. Alvarez/Rosell, Cuba (10), 15-4 (30)

=== Loser's Bracket, Fifth-round (losers eliminated, place fifth) ===
- Maia/Brenha, Portugal (18) def. Smith/Henkel, United States (2), 15-13 (70)
- Child/Heese, Canada (8) def. Bosma/Jimenez, Spain (9), 15-4 (32)

=== Semi-finals ===
- Dodd/Whitmarsh, United States (4) def. Maia/Brenha, Portugal (18), 15-13 (65)
- Kiraly/Steffes, United States (3) def. Child/Heese, Canada (8), 15-11 (40)

=== Bronze medal match ===
- Child/Heese, Canada (8) def. Maia/Brenha, Portugal (18), 12-5 and 12-8 (77)

=== Gold Medal match ===
- Kiraly/Steffes, USA (3) def. Dodd/Whitmarsh, USA (4), 12-5 and 12-8 (62)

== Final round ==
Quarter-finals
July 26
Kiraly/Steffes (USA)	1
Smith/Henkel (USA)	0
Child/Heese (CAN)	1
Bosma/Jimenez (ESP)	0
Dodd/Whitmarsh (USA)	1
Bosma/Jimenez (ESP)	0
Maia/Brenha (POR)	1
Smith/Henkel (USA)	0

Semi-finals
July 27
Kiraly/Steffes (USA)	1
Child/Heese (CAN)	0
Dodd/Whitmarsh (USA)	1
Maia/Brenha (POR)	0

Final
July 28
Kiraly/Steffes (USA)	2
Dodd/Whitmarsh (USA)	0
Bronze medal match
Child/Heese (CAN)	2
Maia/Brenha (POR)	0

== Final ranking ==
RANK	NAME ATHLETES	SEED
Gold medal	Karch Kiraly and Kent Steffes (USA)	3
Silver medal	Mike Dodd and Mike Whitmarsh (USA)	4
Bronze medal	John Child and Mark Heese (CAN)	8
4.	João Brenha and Miguel Maia (POR)	18
5.	Carl Henkel and Sinjin Smith (USA)	2
5.	Javier Bosma and Sixto Jimenez (ESP)	9
7.	Jan Kvalheim and Björn Maaseide (NOR)	6
7.	Francisco Álvarez and Juan Rossell (CUB)	10
9.	Roberto Lopes and Franco Neto (BRA)	1
9.	Zé Marco de Melo and Emanuel Rego (BRA)	5
9.	Jörg Ahmann and Axel Hager (GER)	11
9.	Julien Prosser and Lee Zahner (AUS)	13
13.	Martín Conde and Eduardo Martínez (ARG)	7
13.	Jean-Philippe Jodard and Christian Penigaud (FRA)	12
13.	Andrea Ghiurghi and Nicola Grigolo (ITA)	14
13.	Marek Pakosta and Michal Palinek (CZE)	16
17.	Michel Everaert and Sander Mulder (NED)	15
17.	Miguel Prieto and José Yuste (ESP)	17
17.	Glenn Hamilton and Reid Hamilton (NZL)	19
17.	Eddie Drakich and Marc Dunn (CAN)	20
17.	Avo Keel and Kaido Kreen (EST)	21
17.	Shoji Setoyama and Kazuyuki Takao (JPN)	22
17.	Tom Englen and Fredrik Petersson (SWE)	23
17.	Markoji Markoji and Muchammad Nurmufid (INA)	24

== See also ==
- Women's Beach Volleyball Tournament
- Volleyball at the Summer Olympics
