= Pavlos Beligratis =

Greek beach volleyball player (born 1977)

Personal information
- Nickname: "Beli"
- Nationality: Greece
- Born: November 16, 1977 (age 48); Athens, Greece
- Height: 1.84 m (6 ft 1/2 in)
- Weight: 87 kg (192 lb)

Pavlos Beligratis (Greek: Παύλος Μπελιγράτης; born November 16, 1977, in Athens) is a Greek beach volleyball player.

Beligratis competed at the FIVB Beach Volleyball World Tour between 2000 and 2005. In 2004 he qualified to the Summer Olympics in his hometown, Athens, alongside Athanasios Michalopoulos. During the match against the South Africans Colin Pocock and Gershon Rorich, Beligratis suffered an injury in his right leg and was forced withdraw from the Olympics before the last group stage match against Mariano Baracetti and Martín Conde, from Argentina.
