= Athanasios Michalopoulos =

Greek beach volleyball player (born 1973)

Athanasios Michalopoulos (Greek: Αθανάσιος Μιχαλόπουλος, born September 29, 1973) is an Olympic beach volleyball player from Greece. He competed in the 2004 Summer Olympics.

In 2004, Michalopoulos and his partner Pavlos Beligratis were eliminated in the first round of the Olympic beach volleyball tournament.
