= Matt Grinlaubs =

Australian beach volleyball player (born 1971)

Personal information
- Full name: Matthew Grinlaubs
- Nationality: Australian
- Born: 9 June 1971 (age 55) Christchurch, New Zealand
- Height: 192 cm (76 in)

Sport
- Sport: Beach volleyball

Matthew Grinlaubs (born 9 June 1971) is former professional beach volleyball player who competed for Australia in the men's tournament of the 2000 Summer Olympics with Josh Slack. They finished seventeenth.
