= Kaido Kreen =

Estonian volleyball player (born 1965)

Kaido Kreen (born 12 January 1965 in Viljandi) is an Estonian volleyball player.

1986–1997 he was a member of Estonian volleyball team. 1988 and 1990 his club Tallinna Autobussikoondis won Estonian championships.

He participated in 1996 Atlanta Olympic Games where he played beach volleyball with Avo Keel. They shared the places 17.-24.
