= Oliver Oetke =

German beach volleyball player (born 1968)

Personal information
- Nationality: German
- Born: 18 August 1968 (age 58)

Oliver Oetke (born 18 August 1968) is a German beach volleyball player. Oetke represented Germany in the 2000 Summer Olympics. Oetke and his partner Andreas Scheuerpflug tied for 19th place after losing all their matches.
