= Fabio Díez =

Spanish beach volleyball player (born 1965)

Personal information
- Full name: Fabio Ricardo Diez Steinaker
- Nationality: Spanish
- Born: 18 November 1965 (age 60); Santa Fe, Argentina
Honours
Men's beach volleyball
Representing Spain
European Championships
| Silver medal – second place | 1999 Palma de Mallorca | Beach |

Fabio Ricardo Diez Steinaker (born 18 November 1965 in Santa Fe) is a former male beach volleyball player, who represented Spain at the 2000 Summer Olympics. Alongside Javier Bosma he won the silver medal at the 1999 European Championships in Palma de Mallorca. 3 times Spanish Champion, Argentinean Sub Champion, 3 times bronze medal in International World Tour Fivb.
