= Colin Pocock =

South African beach volleyball player (born 1972)

Personal information
- Nickname: Cowboy
- Born: Colin Eric Innes Pocock; 11 June 1972 (age 54) Harare, Zimbabwe
- Height: 195 cm (6 ft 5 in)
- Weight: 107 kg (236 lb)

Colin Eric Innes Pocock (born 11 June 1972) was a South African beach volleyball player. He is the current owner of Pococks Indoor Beach Volleyball.

== Early and personal life ==
Pocock grew up in Zimbabwe and emigrated to South Africa in 1982. He started off his volleyball career following in his brother’s footsteps when he was schooling at the Port Rex Technical High School in East London, South Africa, first playing as setter and then moving to middle blocker. In 1990, he played for the Border Province Junior and Senior teams. Brothers Michael William Innes Pocock and Andrew Digby Innes Pocock. He is currently married to Kirsten Pocock and has three daughters, Saskia Pocock, Zeevah Innes Pocock and a keelah Innes Pocock.

== Indoor volleyball career ==
Pocock started his volleyball career in 1990 by helping his older brother, Andrew Carbis Innes Pocock train. Pocock quickly found success in the sport due to his natural high jumping ability and his 6 foot-5 inch-tall frame. Pocock made the Border province school team and the Border Senior Men's team in 1990. In 1991, Pocock moved to Bloemfontein to serve his military duties. Pocock was selected to represent the South African National Defence Force team. Pocock was also selected into the South African National volleyball team in 1991. Following this, Pocock achieved the following achievements:

- 1990–2003 Men’s Provincial Teams
- SA National Team – Blocker
- Winner - Zone 6 All African Games Qualifier Botswana
- 1995 Winner - Zone 6 All African Games Qualifier Zimbabwe
- Awarded best blocker in Zone 6
- 1999 4th at the All African Games, South Africa
- 2000 Winner of the Belgium / SA Series, South Africa

== Beach volleyball career ==
Pocock started his beach volleyball career during the holidays after he had just finished his schooling in December 1990. Following his brother on the beach volleyball circuit, he played his first 8 tournaments getting knocked out in the qualifying stages in each one. After his military service and 2 years working in Bophuthatswana, Pocock returned to beach volleyball. By the end of 1995, Pocock had joined team player, Dave Hodge and was ranked Number 1 in South Africa.

In 1996, Pocock sealed his claim as South Africa’s number 1 player by winning the Tri Nations King of the Beach tournament in Durban.

In March 2004, Pocock teamed up with Gershon Rorich and entered the FIVB SWATCH World beach volleyball tour. By August 2004, Pocock and partner had made history by becoming the first beach volleyball team from the African continent to ever qualify for an Olympic Games.

Pocock played the opening beach volleyball match of the 2004 Olympic Games, held in Athens, Greece, against the host nation’s team of Pavlos Beligratis and Thanassis Michalopoulos. The South African’s, ranked 19th, played 3 matches in the round robin phase winning 2 and losing 1. Won vs Pavlos Beligratis / Thanassis Michalopoulos (6) from Greece 21–16, 24–26, 15–10 (1:18) Lost vs Mariano Baracetti / Martin Conde (7) from Argentina 13–21, 15–21 (0:36) Won vs Joao Brenha / Miguel Maia (18) from Portugal 22–20, 22–20 (0:49)

By winning 2 matches, Pocock and partner progressed to the final 16 teams, knockout stage where they were knocked out, placing 9th for the tournament, the highest result ever achieved by any beach volleyball team from Africa. Lost vs Julien Prosser / Mark Williams (17) from Australia 14v21, 10–21 (0:35)

Pocock currently resides in Johannesburg, South Africa and owns the largest indoor beach volleyball venue in Southern Africa.

== See also ==
- South Africa at the 2004 Summer Olympics
- Beach volleyball at the 2004 Summer Olympics – Men's tournament
