= Gershon Rorich =

South African beach volleyball player (1973–2023)

Personal information
- Nationality: South African
- Born: 23 October 1973; Cape Town, South Africa
- Died: 3 April 2023 (aged 49); Cape Town, South Africa
- Height: 1.95 m (6 ft 5 in)
- Weight: 103 kg (227 lb)

Gershon Rorich (23 October 1973 – 3 April 2023) was a South African beach volleyball player.

Rorich competed at the FIVB Beach Volleyball World Tour between 1995 and 2008. In 2004 he qualified to the Summer Olympics, in Athens, with Colin Pocock. They won two matches in the group stage and advanced to the knockout stage, but they lost against the Australians Julien Prosser and Mark Williams in the round of 16.

Rorich died from cancer in Cape Town on 3 April 2023, at the age of 49.
