= Martin Lébl =

Czech volleyball player (born 1980)

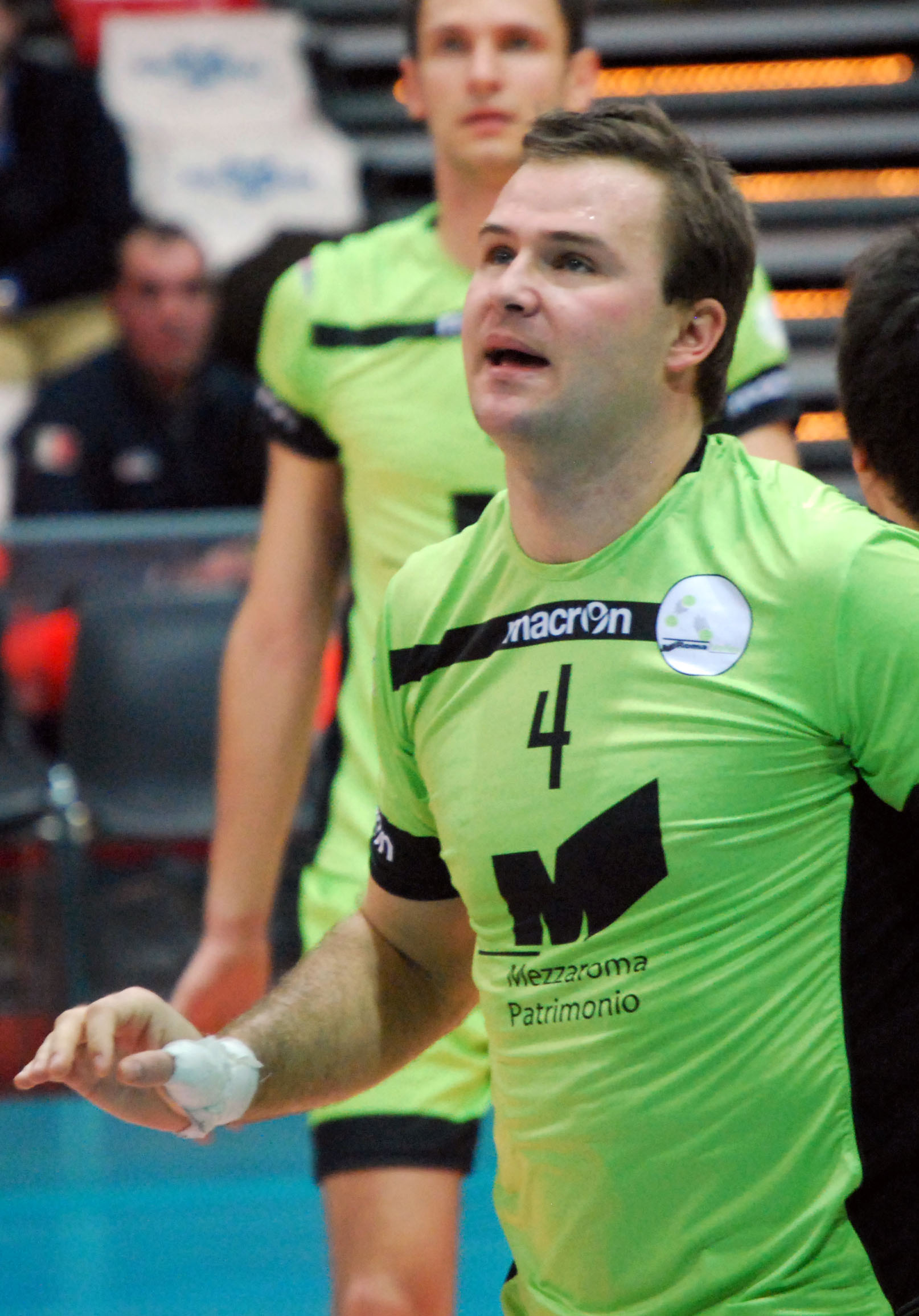
Martin Lébl

Martin Lébl (born 12 April 1980, in Prague) is a volleyball player from the Czech Republic. Lébl competed at the 2000 Summer Olympics in the beach volleyball competition alongside Michal Palinek. As an indoor player, he became Best Attacker at the 2001 European Championship, where the men's national team ended up in fourth place. With Lube Banca Marche Macerata he played at the 2008–09 Indesit Champions League and also was individually awarded "Best Spiker".

== Clubs ==
- (Italy) Lube Banca Marche Macerata (2008–2009)

== Awards ==
=== Individuals ===
- 2001 European Championship "Best Attacker"
- 2008–09 CEV Champions League "Best Spiker"
