= Oliver Stamm =

Personal information
- Full name: Oliver Stamm
- Born: 25 October 1966 (age 60); Vienna, Austria
- Height: 200 cm (6 ft 7 in)

Oliver Stamm (born on 25 October 1966), is an Austrian former professional beach volleyballer.

== Biography ==
Oliver Stamm was born in Vienna on 25 October 1966. He is the son of the former professional footballer Walter Stamm. He went to the Bundesrealgymnasium in Mödling, where he finally swapped volleyball for football in 1981.

Until 1993, he played indoor volleyball. During this time he was Austrian champion and cup winner and had 75 appearances in the Austrian national team. He was also the first Austrian to become a professional international volleyball player in the Spanish honor division near Almería.

From 1993 to 2002, he switched to beach volleyball, where he did pioneering work in Austria. He built up the sport in Austria that did not exist before. With his help, the beach volleyball tournament was set up in Carinthia on Lake Wörthersee in 1996.

During this time he became Austrian champion, had several top placements in World Trophy tournaments and on the FIVB World Tour. He also reached ninth place with Nikolas Berger at the 2000 Summer Olympics Olympic Games in Sydney. He was also ninth at the 2001 World Cup and eighth at the 2001 Goodwill Games in Brisbane. He was also "Players Representative" for several years.

After the end of his beach volleyball career, he hosted the TV quiz program "The Chair - take a seat in Hell" in Cologne for the Austrian private broadcaster ATV. Then he founded a sports management agency (Ecosports consulting) with the Austrian Olympic participant Michael Buchleitner. He returned to television in 2008, where he took part in the fourth season of Dancing Stars and made it through to the third round. He has supported Right To Play since his playing days and is Austria's ambassador.

Since December 2008, he has been working as a consultant for Austrian sports aid.

== Family ==
Oliver Stamm has two children, Constantin (born 2006) and Mia Joy (born 2007), and lives in Klosterneuburg near Vienna.
