= Florian Gosch =

Austrian beach volleyball player (born 1980)

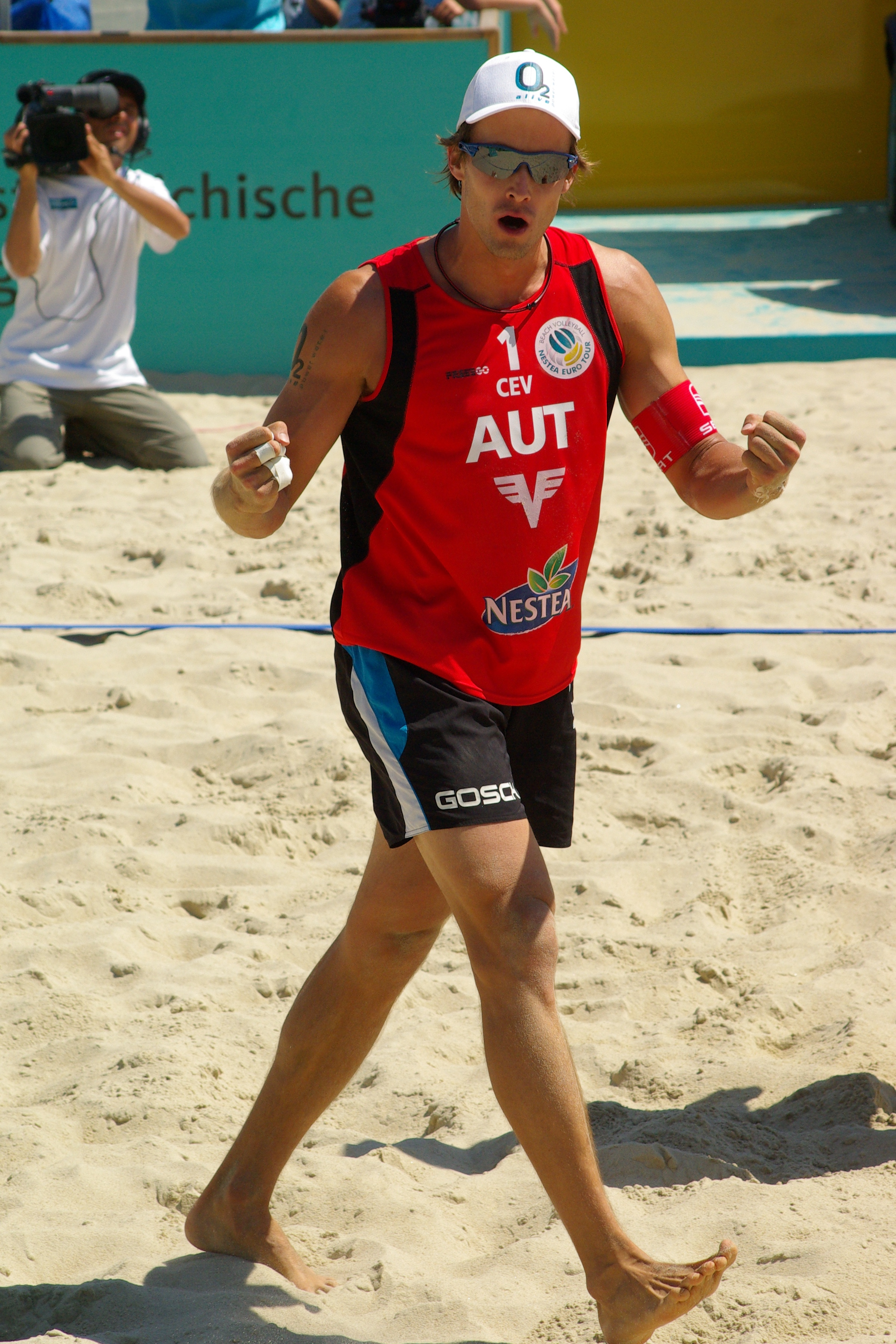

Personal information
- Born: 16 August 1980 (age 46); Austria
- Height: 195 cm (6 ft 5 in)

Beach volleyball information

Current teammate
Teammate
Alexander Horst

Previous teammates
Teammate	Tours (points)
Bernhard Strauss; Simon Nausch; Nikolas Berger; Alexander Huber; Matthias Grumbir	53 (1198); 4 (12); 2 (27); 1 (40); 1 (2)
Honours
Men's beach volleyball
Representing Austria
Swatch FIVB World Tour
Bronze medal – third place	2007 Aland	Beach

Florian Gosch (born 16 August 1980) is a beach volleyball player from Austria.

He and teammate Nikolas Berger represented Austria at the 2004 Summer Olympics in Athens, Greece. Gosch and teammate Alexander Horst represented Austria at the 2008 Summer Olympics in Beijing, China.
