= Karch Kiraly =

American volleyball player and coach

Charles Kiraly
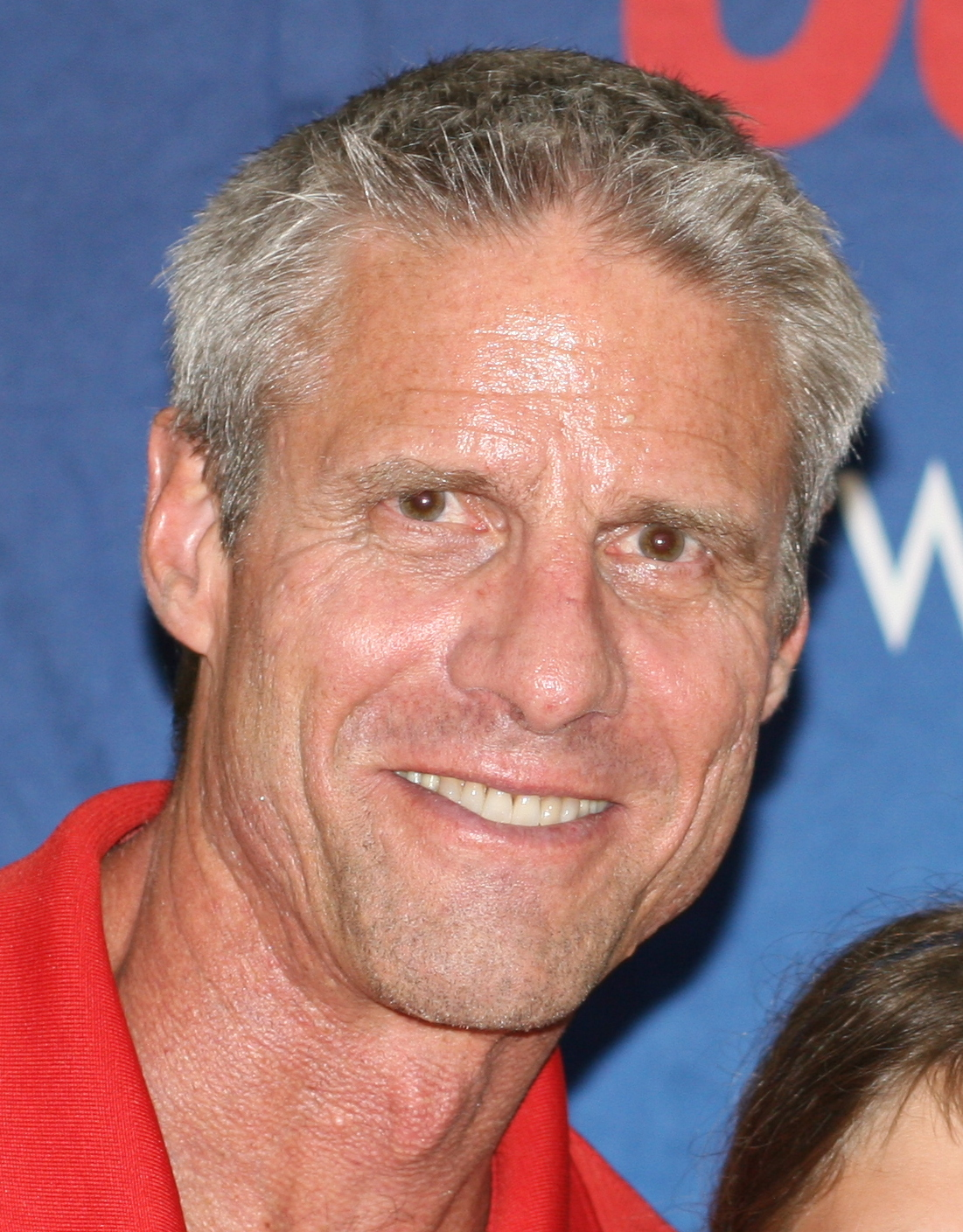

Personal information
- Full name: Charles Frederick Kiraly
- Nickname: Karch
- Born: November 3, 1960 (age 65); Jackson, Michigan, U.S.
- Hometown: Santa Barbara, California, U.S.
- Height: 6 ft 2 in (1.88 m)
- Weight: 205 lb (93 kg)
- Education: UCLA

Coaching information
- Current team: United States

Beach volleyball information
Years	Teammate	Tours (points)
2003	Brent Doble	120

Indoor volleyball information
- Position: Outside hitter
- Number: 15

National team
1981–1989	United States
Medal record
Head coach for the United States women's volleyball
Olympic Games
Gold medal – first place	2020 Tokyo	Indoor
Silver medal – second place	2024 Paris	Indoor
Bronze medal – third place	2016 Rio de Janeiro	Indoor
World Championship
Gold medal – first place	2014 Italy	Indoor
Representing the United States
Olympic Games
Gold medal – first place	1984 Los Angeles	Indoor
Gold medal – first place	1988 Seoul	Indoor
Gold medal – first place	1996 Atlanta	Beach
World Championship
Gold medal – first place	1986 France	Indoor
FIVB World Cup
Gold medal – first place	1985 Japan
Goodwill Games
Silver medal – second place	1986 Moscow
Pan American Games
Gold medal – first place	1987 Indianapolis	Indoor

Charles Frederick "Karch" Kiraly (/ˈkɑːrtʃ kɪˈraɪ/ KARCH kirr-EYE; born November 3, 1960) is an American volleyball player, coach, and broadcast announcer. He was a central part of the U.S National Team that won gold medals at the 1984 and 1988 Olympic Games. He went on to win the gold medal again at the 1996 Olympic Games, the first Olympic competition to feature beach volleyball. He is the only player (man or woman) to have won Olympic medals of any color in both the indoor and beach volleyball categories. He played college volleyball for the UCLA Bruins, where his teams won three national championships under head coach Al Scates. Kiraly is widely regarded as one of the greatest volleyball players of all time.

Kiraly is currently the head coach of the United States men's national volleyball team. Previously, he was the coach of the United States women’s national team leading them to their first-ever gold medal in the 2020 Tokyo Olympics and thereby completing the "triple crown" of coaching an Olympic gold medal-winning team as well as personally winning gold medals in both indoor and beach volleyball.

== Early life ==
Kiraly grew up in Santa Barbara, California. He began playing volleyball at age six with encouragement from his father, Laszlo Kiraly, who had been a member of the Hungarian Junior National team prior to fleeing the country during the Hungarian national uprising of 1956. At age 11, Kiraly entered his first beach volleyball tournament paired with his father. His father played a key role in creating the boys' volleyball program at the school. The Dons of Santa Barbara made it to the championship game twice during Kiraly's high school years, reaching the finals his sophomore year before losing in the championship match to San Clemente High School in 1976. In his senior year, Kiraly's high school team went undefeated, winning CIF SS by defeating Laguna Beach High School in the title game in 1978, and Kiraly was voted Sectional Player of the Year. During his high school years, Kiraly was invited to join the Junior National Team, on which he competed for three years. Kiraly has credited his high school coach, Rick Olmstead, for teaching him the value of hard work and dedication.

While growing up, he had the Hungarian nickname Karcsi (pronounced Karch-ee), which corresponds to the Hungarian name Karoly for Charles. Later at UCLA he began to be called Karch.

== College career ==
In 1978, Kiraly enrolled at UCLA, where he majored in biochemistry and also was a brother of the Epsilon Sigma Chapter of Lambda Chi Alpha. From his freshman year, he played outside hitter and setter on the Bruins' volleyball team, playing opposite junior Sinjin Smith in the Bruins' 6–2 offense. Under head coach Al Scates, Kiraly led UCLA to the NCAA Men's Volleyball Championship in his freshman season in 1979. In his sophomore season, the Bruins made it to the finals again but lost to crosstown rivals USC. UCLA reclaimed the top spot in Kiraly's junior season. Kiraly finished his college career with another title during his senior year. In his four years, the Bruins compiled a 123–5 match record, with titles in 1979, 1981, and 1982. They went undefeated in the 1979 and 1982 seasons. Kiraly earned All-American honors all four years, and was awarded NCAA Volleyball Tournament Most Outstanding Player in 1981 and 1982.

Kiraly earned a Bachelor of Science degree in biochemistry from UCLA, graduating cum laude in June 1983 with a 3.55 cumulative GPA.

Kiraly was inducted into the UCLA Hall of Fame in 1992, and his jersey was retired in 1993.

Growing up, Kiraly wanted to be a biochemist to follow in his father's footsteps, but that changed when he joined the US national team and led it to multiple gold medals. He was twice named the best player in the world by the international governing body. He was also named the best volleyball player of the 20th century along with Lorenzo Bernardi.

== United States national team ==
Kiraly joined the national team in 1981. Playing outside hitter, he proved to be an extremely solid passer. Along with teammate Aldis Berzins, Kiraly was the foundation for the "two-man" serve reception system Doug Beal created in 1983. Along with covering half the court on serve receive and consistently delivering the ball to team setter Dusty Dvorak, Kiraly proved to be an excellent defender and a highly productive outside hitter. Kiraly led the U.S. National Team to the gold medal at the 1984 Summer Olympics, overcoming a pool play loss to Brazil to defeat Brazil in the finals. Kiraly was the youngest player on the gold medal team.

The US National team showed their place as the world's best team by winning the 1985 FIVB World Cup, followed by the 1986 FIVB World Championship. In the 1988 Summer Olympics, the team won its second Olympic gold medal, this time defeating the USSR in the championship match. Kiraly was selected as a captain for the 1988 team at Seoul. FIVB named Kiraly the top player in the world in 1986 and 1988.

Following the 1988 Olympics, Kiraly retired from the national team. He and teammate Steve Timmons played professional volleyball for Il Messaggero Ravenna in Italy from 1990 to 1992. The team included Italians Fabio Vullo and Andrea Gardini, Roberto Masciarelli, and Stefano Margutti as team members. In two seasons the team won a series of titles, including the Italian Volleyball League (1991), the Italian Cup (1991), FIVB Volleyball Men's Club World Championship (1991), CEV Champions League (1992), and the European Supercup (1992).

== Career in beach volleyball ==
Kiraly had a long career on the professional beach circuit, and with 148 career tournaments won is the 'winningest' player in the sport's history. He won at least one tournament in 24 of the 28 seasons he played in a career that spanned four decades. He claimed titles with 13 partners, and in domestic events, he made it to the semifinals over 80% of the time. Kiraly competed into his mid-40s.

Kiraly played in his first beach tournament at age 11 as his father's partner. Kiraly has said as an 11-year-old he was thrilled to discover in beach volleyball he could compete with grown men on even terms. He earned his A and AA ratings on the beach at the age of 15 and his AAA rating at 17. Kiraly's first big beach breakthrough came at Hermosa Beach in 1978. As a 17-year-old who had just graduated from high school, he shocked Hermosa onlookers by gaining the finals before he and partner Marco Ortega lost to the day's dominant team on the beach, Jim Menges and Greg Lee. In the early 1980s, Kiraly made a successful beach team pairing with UCLA teammate Sinjin Smith. The partnership split up as Kiraly came to focus on the U.S. National Team.

In 1992, Kiraly left his indoor career behind, returning to the U.S. to play beach volleyball full-time on the AVP tour. Kiraly chose Kent Steffes as his doubles partner. Steffes was a talented younger player who had left UCLA early to start playing on the professional beach tour. Kiraly and Steffes soon became the dominant pairing on the tour, supplanting former teammate and doubles partner Smith and his partner Randy Stoklos as the beach's top team. In 1996 Kiraly returned to the Olympics, this time competing in beach volleyball with his partner, Steffes. Kiraly and Steffes won the gold medal, the first ever awarded for men's beach volleyball.

Kiraly continued to win tournaments into his 40s, recording two AVP tournament victories with his partner Brent Doble in 2002 and 2003, and four more with Mike Lambert in 2004 and 2005. Kiraly's last victory came in August 2005, when he and Lambert won at Huntington Beach. In 2006, Kiraly partnered with Larry Witt, and in 2007 partnered with Kevin Wong. His teams continued to make high placings. Over his career on the beach, Kiraly won over $3 million in prize money and earned considerably more in endorsements. Kiraly retired from the AVP tour after the 2007 season.

Ultimately Kiraly won 148 professional beach volleyball titles, 74 of them with Steffes. The next closest player in total wins is Sinjin Smith at 139. Following Smith is his longtime partner, Randy Stoklos, at 122. The next closest player is Kent Steffes at 110, followed by Emanuel Rego, with 78 wins.

== Broadcasting ==
Kiraly has worked as a broadcaster for ESPN and provided color commentary for the AVP on NBC broadcasts. Kiraly worked as an analyst for NBC Sports during their coverage of the beach volleyball competition at the 2008 Summer Olympics.

== Coaching career ==
Kiraly began coaching at St. Margaret's Episcopal High School, where he coached his sons, Kristian and Kory.

Head coach Hugh McCutcheon of the US National Women's Volleyball team hired Kiraly as an assistant, where he helped coach the team to a silver medal at the 2012 London Olympics.

In 2012, Kiraly was named head coach of the US National Women's Volleyball team to try to compete in the 2016 Olympics in Rio de Janeiro, Brazil. In October 2014, Kiraly coached the Women's National Team to the FIVB World Championship, defeating China in the Gold Medal final. In doing so, Kiraly became the fourth person to win a World Championship gold medal as a player and a coach.

During the 2016 Olympics in Rio de Janeiro, Kiraly coached the US women to a bronze medal, becoming the fourth player to win medals as player and coach.

The FIVB Volleyball Women's Nations League 2021 championship was held in Italy and Karch coached the women's indoor USA team to win the top prize of $1 million.

On August 8, 2021, during the 2020 Olympics in Tokyo, Japan, Kiraly coached the US women to a gold medal, becoming the second person to win a gold medal as player and coach; the first was Lang Ping from China.

== Personal life ==
Kiraly resides in Heber City, Utah, with his wife Janna, and two sons, Kristian and Kory. His father, Laszlo Kiraly, played for the Hungarian junior national volleyball team. Kiraly studied biochemistry in college, and considered pursuing a career in medicine after completing college.

Kiraly babysat Misty May-Treanor when she was a youngster.

On the same day Kiraly led the national team to their historic gold medal win at the 2020 Summer Olympics, he revealed that he was diagnosed with colon cancer in 2017 and had to have doctors remove part of his colon in order to fight the disease. Trying to keep the team in good working order, he did not want to make his team feel sad and decided not to share the news with them until he went into cancer remission in 2021.

== Publications ==
Kiraly is the author of three books, Karch Kiraly's Championship Volleyball, co-authored with Jon Hastings and published by Simon and Schuster in 1996, Beach Volleyball, co-authored with Byron Shewman and published by Human Kinetics in 1999, and Chasing Greatness, co-authored with Don Patterson and published by Total Sports LLC in 2023.

== Popular culture ==
In 1994, Kiraly acted in an episode of the television show Baywatch titled "I Spike."

== Awards and honors ==
College

- NCAA National Champion (1979, 1981, 1982) and Runner-Up (1980)
- NCAA Volleyball Tournament Most Outstanding Player (1981, 1982) and All-Tournament Team (1980, 1981, 1982)
- UCLA Hall of Fame (inducted 1992)

Fédération Internationale de Volleyball (FIVB: International Federation of Volleyball)

- FIVB Best Player in the World (1986, 1988)
- FIVB Best Player of the 20th Century

American Volleyball Professionals (AVP Professional Beach Volleyball)

- AVP Best Offensive Player (1990, 1993, 1994)
- AVP Best Defensive Player (2002)
- AVP Comeback Player of the Year (1997)
- AVP Most Valuable Player (1990, 1992, 1993, 1994, 1995, 1998)
- AVP Sportsman of the Year (1995, 1997, 1998)
- AVP Outstanding Achievement Award (2004)

Other

- NORCECA Championship (1983, 1985) and silver medal (1981)
- Olympic Games (1984, 1988, 1996)
  - MVP Olympic Games (1988)
- World Cup (1985)
  - MVP World Cup (1985)
- World Championship (1986)
- Goodwill Games silver medal (1986)
- Pan American Games (1987)
- Italian Championship (1990/1991)
- Club World Cup (1991)
  - MVP Club World Cup (1991)
- European Champions Cup (1991/1992)
- European Super Cup (1991)

Volleyball Hall of Fame inducted 2001.

American Volleyball Coaches Association

- AVCA Hall of Fame inducted 2005.

College Sports Information Directors of America

- Academic All-America Hall of Fame inducted 2009.

U.S. Olympic Hall of Fame in 2008.

Preceded by (New Zealand) Hugh McCutcheon	United States women's national volleyball team coach 2012–present	Succeeded by Incumbent
