= Lee Zahner =

Australian beach volleyball player (born 1974)

Lee Zahner (born 13 March 1974 in Brisbane, Queensland) is a male beach volleyball player who represented Australia many times in including the 2000 Summer Olympics where he and teammate Julien Prosser ended up in 9th place.

Zahner is also a licensed commercial and private pilot, and works in the investment property and real estate sector.
