= Kent Steffes =

American volleyball player (born 1968)

Personal information
- Born: June 23, 1968 (age 58); Ann Arbor, Michigan, U.S.
- Height: 6 ft 4 in (193 cm)
- Education: Stanford University, UCLA
Medal record
Men's beach volleyball
Representing the United States
Olympic Games
Gold medal – first place	1996 Atlanta	Beach
World Championships
Gold medal – first place	1993 Rio de Janeiro	Beach
Bronze medal – third place	1997 Los Angeles	Beach

Kent Steffes (born June 23, 1968) is an American former professional beach volleyball player.

Steffes received his AAA beach rating while still attending Palisades High School. He was named the 1986 National High School Player of the Year. He enrolled at Stanford University and played for one season before transferring to UCLA, where he graduated with a degree in economics. While a Bruin he joined the AVP Tour full-time in 1988.

Steffes earned the AVP No. 1 ranking at age 22, the youngest player to do so in the history of the sport. Steffes and his partner Karch Kiraly won the inaugural beach volleyball gold medal at the 1996 Summer Olympics in Atlanta. That same year, he was selected as the MVP of the AVP.

In his career, Steffes teamed with numerous partners to win 110 events, and has the highest tournament winning percentage in the history of the sport (48.6%). By the time Steffes retired in 1999, he had won over $2,500,000 in prizes.

In 2004, Steffes was inducted into the California Beach Volleyball Hall of Fame. In 2020, Steffes was inducted into the USA Volleyball Hall of Fame as an All-Time Great Male Beach Player.

== Personal life ==
Steffes became a member of the AVP Board of Directors, and also served as secretary. In 2000, he enrolled in the Graduate School of Business at Stanford, where he graduated in 2002. He has two children and lives in Los Angeles, California, where he writes and works in the financial industry.

== Book ==
Steffes is the co-author of the book Kings of Summer: The Rise of Beach Volleyball. Together with his co-author Travis Mewhirter, it chronicles the rise of beach volleyball from a 1970s rebel culture to inclusion in the 1996 Summer Olympics, and offers an in-depth look at the dramatic quarterfinal match between Steffes and his partner Karch Kiraly against Sinjin Smith and Carl Henkel.

== Awards and honors ==
- "Most dominant player of the 1990s"
- USA Volleyball Hall of Fame Inductee (2020) All-Time Great Beach Player
- CBVA Hall of Fame (2004)
