= Nicole Sanderson =

Australian beach volleyball player

Personal information
- Full name: Nicole Therese Sanderson
- Nationality: Australian
- Born: 1 April 1976 (age 50); Perth, Western Australia
- Height: 1.82 m (5 ft 11 1/2 in)
- Weight: 65 kg (143 lb)
Honours
Women's beach volleyball
Representing Australia
World Championships
Bronze medal – third place	2003 Rio de Janeiro	Beach

Nicole Hannan (née Sanderson, born 1 April 1976) is an Australian former beach volleyball player.

Sanderson started her career in indoor volleyball where played for Pepperdine University, in the United States. In 1998, she competed for the first time in FIVB Beach Volleyball World Tour where she took part until the 2006 season.

Her best World Tour result was a second place in Osaka, Japan, alongside Natalie Cook in 2004. That year they have been selected to represent Australia at the 2004 Summer Olympics, in Athens. Cook had won the gold medal at the 2000 Sydney Olympics (with Kerri Pottharst) and they won a bronze medal at the 2003 Beach Volleyball World Championships in Rio de Janeiro. They finished the Olympics in 4th place after losing the bronze medal match to Americans Holly McPeak and Elaine Youngs.
