= Nikolas Berger =

Austrian beach volleyball player

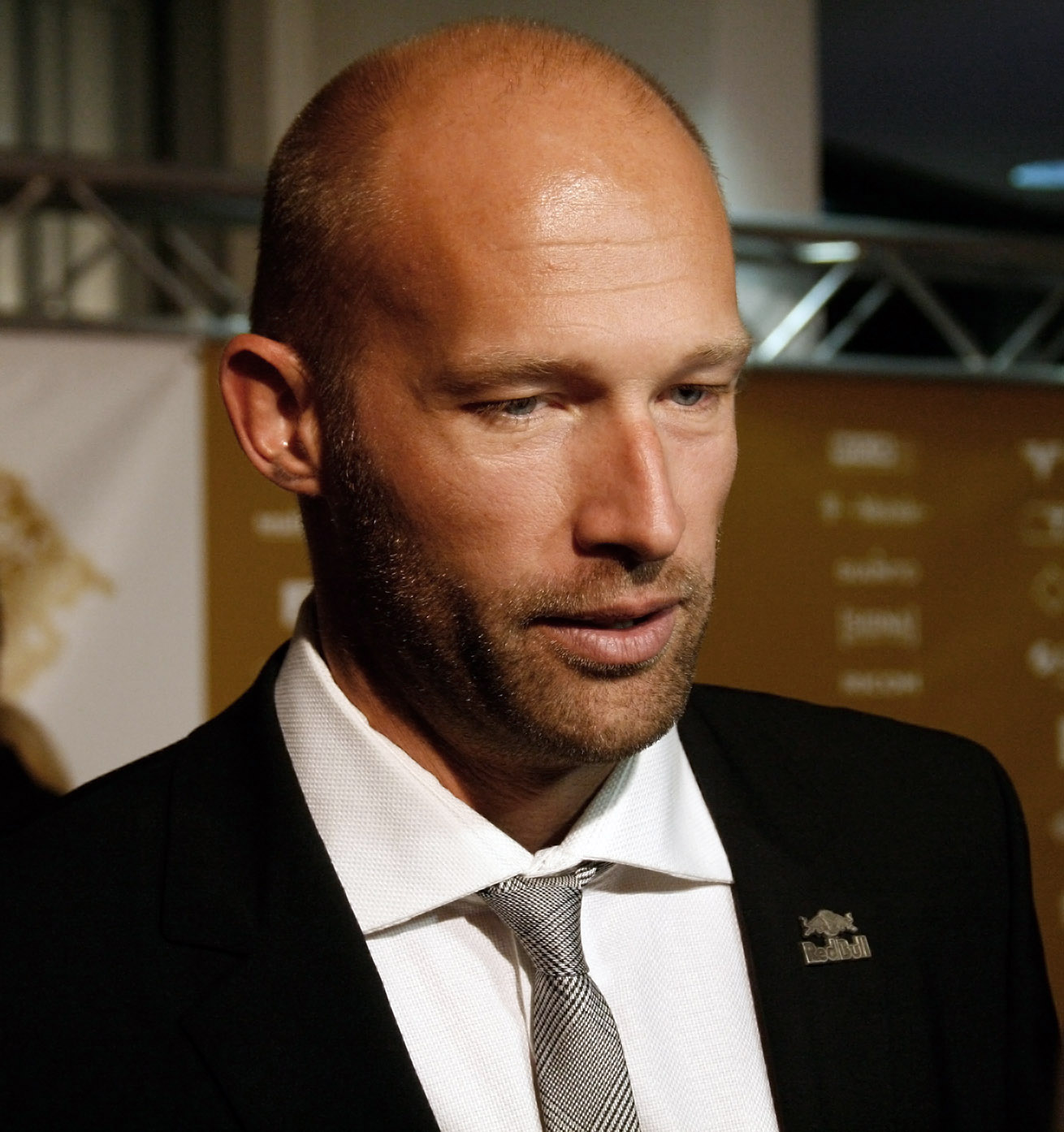
- Berger in 2010

Personal information
- Nickname: "Nik"
- Nationality: Austria
- Born: March 18, 1974 (age 52); Salzburg, Austria
- Height: 1.99 m (6 ft 6 1/2 in)
- Weight: 92 kg (203 lb)
Honours
Men's beach volleyball
Representing Austria
European Championships
Gold medal – first place	2003 Alanya	Beach

Nikolas "Nik" Berger (born March 18, 1974, in Salzburg) is an Austrian beach volleyball player.

Berger began his career in indoor volleyball in 1986. Among his major achievements are the Austrian national championships runner-up with PLO/ASV Salzburg in 1992 and after he moved to the capital for playing with the club Donaukraft Vienna, he was four times Austrian champion and Austrian Cup winner. At the 1999 European Championship, play at home in Vienna, Berger finished his career in indoor volleyball.

In 1993, he had also begun parallel career with the beach volleyball. With Oliver Stamm, Berger competed at the 2000 Summer Olympics, in Sydney, but they lost to the Brazilian duo Zé Marco de Melo/Ricardo Santos. At the 2004 Summer Olympics, in Athens, he plays with Florian Gosch after an injury to his season partner Clemens Doppler. A year earlier he won the European Championships with Doppler.

After the 2005 season the duo Berger/Doppler went their separate ways. Berger plays with Robert Nowotny until the 2008 season.
