= Francisco Álvarez (beach volleyball) =

Cuban beach volleyball player (born 1969)

Personal information
- Full name: Francisco Álvarez Cutiño
- Born: April 12, 1969 (age 57); San Luis, Santiago de Cuba, Cuba
- Height: 6 ft 0 in (1.83 m)

Beach volleyball information
Teammate
Juan Rossell
Honours
Men's beach volleyball
Representing Cuba
Pan American Games
Gold medal – first place	2003 Santo Domingo	Beach
Bronze medal – third place	2007 Rio de Janeiro	Beach

Francisco "Francis" Álvarez Cutiño (born April 12, 1969) is a beach volleyball player from Cuba who won the gold medal in the men's beach team competition at the 2003 Pan American Games in Santo Domingo, Dominican Republic, partnering with Juan Rossell. He represented his native country at the 1996 and the 2004 Summer Olympics.
