= Robert Nowotny =

Austrian beach volleyball player (born 1974)

Personal information
- Nickname: "Nowo"
- Nationality: Austria
- Born: January 27, 1974 (age 52); Vienna, Austria
- Height: 1.85 m (6 ft 1 in)
- Weight: 83 kg (183 lb)

Robert Nowotny (born January 27, 1974, in Vienna) is an Austrian beach volleyball player.

Nowotny began his career at the FIVB World Tour in 1996. From the 2000 season went on to compete with your long-time partner, Peter Gartmayer, where they remained until 2005. In 2004 Gartmayer/Nowotny obtained the qualification for the 2004 Summer Olympics, in Athens, but they lost all their games in the group stage and did not advance to the medal round.
