= Andreas Scheuerpflug =

German beach volleyball player

Personal information
- Full name: Andreas Scheuerpflug
- Nationality: German
- Born: July 13, 1967 (age 59); Alpirsbach, Baden-Württemberg, West Germany
- Height: 6 ft 5 in (196 cm)

Andreas Scheuerpflug (born July 13, 1967) is a German beach volleyball player. Scheuerpflug participated for Germany in both the 2000 and 2004 Summer Olympics. He partnered with Oliver Oetke in Sydney, and the pair failed to win a match. Scheuerpflug had more success in Athens, where he partnered with Christoph Dieckmann and won their pool, ultimately finishing in a tie for fifth place. Professionally, Scheuerpflug won four career tournaments, all with Dieckmann.
