= Björn Berg =

Swedish beach volleyball player (born 1972)

Personal information
- Nickname: Björn Berg
- Nationality: Swedish
- Born: January 24, 1972 (age 54); Umeå, Sweden

National team
Sweden

Björn Berg (born January 24, 1972, in Umeå) is a beach volleyball player from Sweden, who competed in two consecutive Summer Olympics for his native country, starting in 2000. In both tournaments he teamed up with Simon Dahl.

== Playing Partners ==
- Simon Dahl
- Hannes Brinkborg
- Robert Svensson
- Emil Norberg
- Tom Englen
