= Joshua Slack =

Austrian beach volleyball player

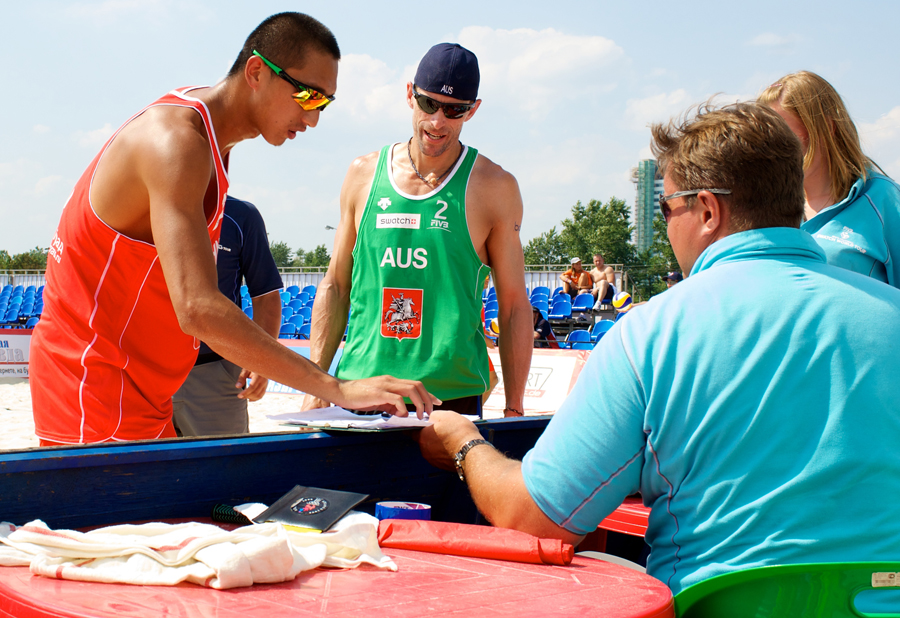
- Grand Slam Moscow 2011

Personal information
- Nickname: Josh
- Born: 16 December 1976 (age 49) Brisbane, Queensland, Australia
- Height: 191 cm (6 ft 3 in)
- Weight: 88 kg (194 lb)
Beach volleyball information
Current teammate
Years	Teammate	
–	Andrew Schacht	
Previous teammates
Years	Teammate	Tours (points)
–	Matthew Grinlaubs; Jarrod Novosel	26 (501); 11 (572)

Joshua "Josh" Slack (born 16 December 1976) is a male beach volleyball player from Australia.

He represented Australia at the 2000 Summer Olympics with teammate Matthew Grinlaubs. Slack and teammate Andrew Schacht represented Australia at the 2004 Summer Olympics, and the 2008 Summer Olympics.

== Early years ==
Slack took up beach volleyball in 1998 to get fit for soccer. He joined the world tour in 1999 and competed at his first Olympic Games in 2000 where he placed 17th. In 2002 he convinced Andrew Schacht to come out of retirement and the pair won bronze at the 2003 World Tour in Portugal. The two of them then won a national title, a top 10 international ranking and 2004 Olympic Team selection.

He competed on the Australian Beach Volleyball (ABV) circuit for eleven years, winning more than ten ABV event and Australian Championships titles. He received the ABV Tour MVP award for the 2006-07 season. A three-time Olympian, Slack also won medals in international competitions, including the FIVB World Tour and the FIVB World Championships.

== Achievements ==
Slack joined the world tour in 1999 and competed at his first Olympic Games in 2000. He was placed 17th. In 2002 he teamed up with Andrew Schacht (who came out of retirement) and the pair won bronze at the 2003 World Tour in Portugal. They then went on to win a national title, a top 10 international ranking and 2004 Olympic Team selection. Slack and Schacht finished 9th in the 2004 Athens Olympics and again finished ninth at the 2008 Beijing Olympics.

In 2007 Slack and Shacht won a bronze medal at the FIVB World Championships. This was the highest ever performance by any Australian men's volleyball team at the time.
