= Simon Dahl =

Swedish beach volleyball player (born 1975)

Personal information
- Nickname: Simon Dahl
- Nationality: Swedish
- Born: February 6, 1975 (age 51); Skövde, Sweden

National team
Sweden

Simon Dahl (born February 6, 1975, in Skövde) is a beach volleyball player from Sweden, who competed in two consecutive Summer Olympics for his native country, starting in 2000. In both tournaments he teamed up with Björn Berg. He's a resident of Stockholm.

== Playing Partners ==
- Björn Berg
- Stefan Gunnarsson
