= Dain Blanton =

American beach volleyball player

Personal information
- Full name: Dain J. Blanton
- Born: November 28, 1971 (age 54); Laguna Beach, California, U.S.
- Height: 6 ft 3 in (191 cm)
- Education: Pepperdine University
Medal record
Men's beach volleyball
Representing the United States
Olympic Games
Gold medal – first place	2000 Sydney	Beach
World Championships
Bronze medal – third place	1997 Los Angeles	Beach
World Tour
Gold medal – first place	2003 Rhodes	Beach
Bronze medal – third place	2003 Marseille	Beach

Dain J. Blanton (born November 28, 1971) is an American former beach volleyball player who won the gold medal in beach volleyball in the 2000 Olympic Games in Sydney with partner Eric Fonoimoana. He returned to the 2004 Olympic Games in Athens with partner Jeff Nygaard, becoming the first two-time U.S. male beach volleyball Olympian. He is the current head coach for the USC Trojans women's beach volleyball team, having won 6 national titles with the program (4 as head coach, 2 as assistant coach).

== Career ==
Blanton is one of the only players in the history of volleyball to win a championship at every level of the game (collegiate, Olympic, and professional).

As a high school senior in 1990, Blanton was named the Orange County Player of the Year, Most Valuable Player of the Pacific Coast League and earned All-American honors at the Junior Olympics. Blanton was also an All-State Basketball player who led Laguna Beach to the CIF Finals in 1990.

Blanton attended Pepperdine University, where he was an All-American and guided the Waves to an NCAA Championship in 1992 as a sophomore.

Blanton was known for his fast serve, holding the AVP record for 11 aces in a single game to 15 in Vail, Colorado, in 1997.

After winning gold at the 2000 Olympics, Blanton and Fonoimoana broke their partnership because of rule changes that went into effect in 2001. (Rally or point per play scoring as opposed to having to serve to score a point; court size changed from 30x30 feet per side to 8x8 meters). Height became a deciding factor because the new rules provided an advantage for a full-time tall blocker at the net. They went separate ways in search of big blockers. In the 2004 Olympics, Blanton and Nygaard were seeded eighth, but failed to advance out of pool play.

Currently, Blanton is a sports broadcasting analyst covering the FIVB, AVP, NVL (National Volleyball League), and the Jose Cuervo Pro Beach Series, as well as working as a sideline reporter for the Los Angeles Clippers. His career in sports broadcasting has involved working with ABC, NBC, ESPN, Fox Sports Net, and Universal Sports Network. He covers many sports including NBA, beach volleyball, MLB, college basketball, and college football. Blanton also does motivational speaking events each year to inspire and be a role-model.

Blanton was the runner-up to Andrew Firestone on the third season of the ABC television network reality show The Bachelor.

== Awards and honors ==
- 1992 NCAA National Champion (Pepperdine University)
- 1994 NCAA All-American
- 1997 Special Achievement
- 2000 Olympic Gold Medalist (beach volleyball with partner Eric Fonoimoana)
- 2004 Olympian (beach volleyball with partner Jeff Nygaard)
- 2003 AVP Best Offensive Player
- 2003 Team of the Year
- 2015 AVCA National Champion (women's beach volleyball, USC) Assistant Coach
- 2016 NCAA National Champion (women's beach volleyball, USC) Assistant Coach
- 2017 NCAA National Champion (women's beach volleyball, USC) Assistant Coach
- 2021 NCAA National Champion (women's beach volleyball, USC) Head Coach
- 2022 NCAA National Champion (women's beach volleyball, USC) Head Coach
- 2023 NCAA National Champion (women's beach volleyball, USC) Head Coach
- 2024 NCAA National Champion (women's beach volleyball, USC) Head Coach
