= Mariano Baracetti =

Argentine beach volleyball player (born 1974)

Personal information
- Full name: Mariano Joaquín Baracetti
- Nickname: Mono
- Born: July 12, 1974 (age 52); Buenos Aires, Argentina
- Height: 6 ft 4 in (1.93 m)
Honours
Men's beach volleyball
Representing Argentina
World Championships
Gold medal – first place	2001 Klagenfurt	Beach

Mariano "Mono" Joaquín Baracetti (born July 12, 1974, in Buenos Aires) is a beach volleyball player from Argentina who won the world title at the 2001 Beach Volleyball World Championships in Klagenfurt, Austria partnering with Martín Conde. He represented his native country at three consecutive Summer Olympics, starting in 2000 (Sydney, Australia).

Sporting positions
Preceded by Emanuel Rego and Tande Ramos (BRA)	Men's FIVB Beach Volley World Tour Winner alongside (Argentina) Martín Conde; 2002	Succeeded by Emanuel Rego and Ricardo Santos (BRA)
