= Javier Bosma =

Spanish beach volleyball player

Personal information
- Full name: Francisco Javier Bosma Mínguez
- Nationality: Spanish
- Born: 6 November 1969 (age 56); Roses, Girona, Spain
- Height: 6 ft 3 in (1.91 m)
Honours
Men's beach volleyball
Representing Spain
Olympic Games
Silver medal – second place	2004 Athens	Beach
European Championships
Silver medal – second place	1994 Almería	Beach
Silver medal – second place	1999 Palma de Mallorca	Beach

Francisco Javier Bosma Mínguez (born 6 November 1969 in Roses, Girona) is a Spanish former beach volleyball player who won the silver medal in the men's beach volleyball tournament at the 2004 Summer Olympics in Athens together with Pablo Herrera. He is a three-time Olympian.

Bosma also competed at the 1996 Summer Olympics and the 2000 Summer Olympics, finishing fifth both times.

Bosma's beach volleyball career stretched from 1992 to 2006. As a beach volleyball player, he earned $300,000 in prizes in his career.
