= Mark Heese =

Canadian beach volleyball player (born 1969)

Personal information
- Born: August 15, 1969 (age 57); Toronto, Ontario, Canada
- Height: 6 ft 0 in (1.83 m)
- Weight: 187 lb (85 kg)
- Education: McMaster University
Honours
Men's beach volleyball
Representing Canada
Olympic Games
Bronze medal – third place	1996 Atlanta	Beach

Mark Heese (born August 15, 1969) is a Canadian male beach volleyball player.

Born in Toronto, Ontario, Heese began playing beach volleyball at the age of 19 at the Balmy Beach Club in Toronto, and is a graduate of McMaster University where he played university volleyball for the Marauders for four seasons from 1988 to 1992. Heese is a three-time Olympian, which included the winning of a bronze medal in Atlanta during the 1996 Summer Olympics with partner John Child. Heese and Child also finished in 5th place during both the 2000 Summer Olympics and 2004 Summer Olympics. He also is a ten-time Canadian National champion winning with John Child (7), Rich Van Huzien (1) and Ahren Cadieux (2).

On July 7, 1996 in Berlin, Germany, Heese along with his partner Child won their first FIVB International Open tournament by defeating Para and Marques of Brazil.

Awards
Preceded by Inaugural	Men's FIVB World Tour "Most Inspirational"; 2005	Succeeded by Franco Neto (BRA)
