= John Child (volleyball) =

Canadian beach volleyball player (born 1967)

Personal information
- Born: May 4, 1967 (age 59); Toronto, Ontario, Canada
Honours
Men's beach volleyball
Representing Canada
Olympic Games
Bronze medal – third place	1996 Atlanta	Beach

John Child (born May 4, 1967) is a retired professional Canadian male beach volleyball player.

Child began playing beach volleyball in tournaments at age 16, and is a graduate of Centennial College. He played in three Olympic Games; Atlanta in 1996, Sydney in 2000, and Athens in 2004. He won the bronze medal at the 1996 Summer Olympics, partnering with Mark Heese.

John and his partner were the first Canadian team to medal at the Olympics in the sport of beach volleyball.

Child lives in Toronto, Ontario. He retired at age 38. He was coached by Hernan Humana.

Child now coaches and is the founder of the Leaside Volleyball Club in Toronto.

Child is actively involved in the volleyball community, and his children Jenna and Adam also play.
