= Martín Conde =

Argentine beach volleyball player (born 1971)

Personal information
- Born: 25 August 1971 (age 55); Mar del Plata, Argentina
- Height: 6 ft 1 in (185 cm)
Honours
Men's beach volleyball
Representing Argentina
World Championships
Gold medal – first place	2001 Klagenfurt	Beach

Martín Alejo Conde (born 25 August 1971, in Mar del Plata) is an Argentine beach volleyball player who won the world title at the 2001 Beach Volleyball World Championships in Klagenfurt, Austria, partnering with Mariano Baracetti. He represented his native country at four consecutive Summer Olympics, starting in 1996 (Atlanta, Georgia).

Sporting positions
Preceded by Emanuel Rego and Tande Ramos (BRA)	Men's FIVB Beach Volley World Tour Winner alongside (Argentina) Mariano Baracetti; 2002	Succeeded by Emanuel Rego and Ricardo Santos (BRA)
Awards
Preceded by Márcio Araújo (BRA)	Men's FIVB World Tour "Best Defender"; 2006	Succeeded by Todd Rogers (USA)
