= Miguel Maia =

Portuguese beach volleyball player (born 1971)

Personal information
- Nickname: Luis Miguel Barbosa Maia
- Nationality: Portuguese
- Born: April 23, 1971 (age 55); Paranhos, Portugal

National team
Portugal

Luis Miguel Barbosa Maia (born April 23, 1971 in Paranhos) is a beach volleyball player from Portugal, who competed in three consecutive Summer Olympics for his native country, starting in 1996. He ended up in fourth place in Atlanta (1996) and in Sydney (2000), alongside João Brenha, after having lost the bronze medal match against the German couple Axel Hager / Jörg Ahmann. He currently plays for Sporting CP.
