= João Brenha =

Portuguese beach volleyball player (born 1970)

Personal information
- Nickname: João Carlos Brenha Alves Pereira
- Nationality: Portuguese
- Born: May 6, 1970 (age 56); Espinho, Portugal

João Carlos Brenha Alves Pereira (born May 6, 1970 in Espinho) is a beach volleyball player from Portugal, who competed in three consecutive Summer Olympics for his native country, starting in 1996. He ended up in fourth place in Atlanta (1996) and Sydney (2000), alongside Miguel Maia, after having lost the bronze medal match against the German couple Axel Hager / Jörg Ahmann.

== Playing Partners ==
- Miguel Maia
