= Julien Prosser =

Australian beach volleyball player (born 1972)

Julien Prosser (born 11 June 1972 in Bunbury, Western Australia) is a male beach volleyball player who represented Australia in three consecutive Summer Olympics, starting in 1996.

Australia's most successful player ever, Three Olympic Games – Atlanta (9th), Sydney (9th) and Athens (4th), 144 FIVB World Tour events and winning 14 Australian National Titles, playing more international beach volleyball games than anyone in the world.
