= 2008 AVP Pro Beach Volleyball Tour =

- League: Association of Volleyball Professionals
- Sport: Beach volleyball
- Duration: January 10 – September 27, 2008
- TV partner(s): Fox Sports Networks; NBC; MyNetworkTV

Seasons
- ← 2007 2009 →

The 2008 AVP Pro Beach Volleyball Tour was a domestic professional beach volleyball circuit organized in the United States by the Association of Volleyball Professionals (AVP) for the 2008 beach volleyball season. The 2008 AVP calendar comprises the Hot Winter Nights Tour, an indoor beach volleyball circuit, and the main AVP Crocs Tour.

== Schedule ==
=== Hot Winter Nights Tour ===
This is the complete schedule of events on the 2008 Hot Winter Nights calendar, with the players' final standings. Each event consisted of four invited men and women players competing in a one-night round-robin tournament in an indoor beach volleyball arena.

==== Men ====
Tournament	1st	2nd	3rd	4th
Oklahoma City Hot Winter Nights; Oklahoma City, Oklahoma; US$12,500; January 10	Mark Williams (USA)	Sean Scott (USA)	Dain Blanton (USA)	Anthony Medel (USA)
St. Louis Hot Winter Nights; St. Louis, Missouri; US$12,500; January 11	Sean Scott (USA)	Anthony Medel (USA)	Mark Williams (USA)	Dain Blanton (USA)
Kansas City Hot Winter Nights; Kansas City, Missouri; US$12,500; January 12	Mark Williams (USA)	Anthony Medel (USA)	Sean Scott (USA)	Dain Blanton (USA)
Milwaukee Hot Winter Nights; Milwaukee, Wisconsin; US$12,500; January 17	John Hyden (USA)	Jeff Nygaard (USA)	Matt Fuerbringer (USA)	Dax Holdren (USA)
Madison Hot Winter Nights; Madison, Wisconsin; US$12,500; January 18	Matt Fuerbringer (USA)	Dax Holdren (USA)	John Hyden (USA)	Jeff Nygaard (USA)
La Crosse Hot Winter Nights; La Crosse, Wisconsin; US$12,500; January 19	Dax Holdren (USA)	Matt Fuerbringer (USA)	John Hyden (USA)	Jeff Nygaard (USA)
Minneapolis Hot Winter Nights; Minneapolis, Minnesota; US$12,500; January 24	Kevin Wong (USA)	Hans Stolfus (USA)	John Hyden (USA)	Brad Keenan (USA)
Columbus Hot Winter Nights; Columbus, Ohio; US$12,500; January 26	Kevin Wong (USA)	Hans Stolfus (USA)	Brad Keenan (USA)	John Hyden (USA)
Albany Hot Winter Nights; Albany, New York; US$12,500; January 30	Jake Gibb (USA)	Sean Scott (USA)	Stein Metzger (USA)	Sean Rosenthal (USA)
Trenton Hot Winter Nights; Trenton, New Jersey; US$12,500; January 31	Jake Gibb (USA)	Stein Metzger (USA)	Sean Rosenthal (USA)	Sean Scott (USA)
Norfolk Hot Winter Nights; Norfolk, Virginia; US$12,500; February 1	Sean Scott (USA)	Sean Rosenthal (USA)	Jake Gibb (USA)	Stein Metzger (USA)
Charlottesville Hot Winter Nights; Charlottesville, Virginia; US$12,500; February 2	Sean Rosenthal (USA)	Jake Gibb (USA)	Stein Metzger (USA)	Sean Scott (USA)
Omaha Hot Winter Nights; Omaha, Nebraska; US$12,500; February 7	Casey Jennings (USA)	Matt Fuerbringer (USA)	Jake Gibb (USA)	Sean Rosenthal (USA)
Rosemont Hot Winter Nights; Rosemont, Illinois; US$12,500; February 8	Jake Gibb (USA)	Matt Fuerbringer (USA)	Sean Rosenthal (USA)	Casey Jennings (USA)
Bloomington Hot Winter Nights; Bloomington, Illinois; US$12,500; February 9	Sean Rosenthal (USA)	Matt Fuerbringer (USA)	Jake Gibb (USA)	Casey Jennings (USA)
Spokane Hot Winter Nights; Spokane, Washington; US$12,500; February 13	Casey Jennings (USA)	Mike Lambert (USA)	Brad Kennan (USA)	Stein Metzger (USA)
Everett Hot Winter Nights; Everett, Washington; US$12,500; February 14	Casey Jennings (USA)	Stein Metzger (USA)	Brad Kennan (USA)	Mike Lambert (USA)
Portland Hot Winter Nights; Portland, Oregon; US$12,500; February 16	Brad Kennan (USA)	Mike Lambert (USA)	Casey Jennings (USA)	Stein Metzger (USA)
Las Vegas Hot Winter Nights; Las Vegas, Nevada; US$12,500; February 23	Sean Rosenthal (USA)	Mike Lambert (USA)	Casey Jennings (USA)	Todd Rogers (USA)

==== Women ====
Tournament	1st	2nd	3rd	4th
Oklahoma City Hot Winter Nights; Oklahoma City, Oklahoma; US$12,500; January 10	Nancy Reynolds (USA)	Rachel Wacholder (USA)	Jenny Johnson Jordan (USA)	Holly McPeak (USA)
St. Louis Hot Winter Nights; St. Louis, Missouri; US$12,500; January 11	Rachel Wacholder (USA)	Jenny Johnson Jordan (USA)	Holly McPeak (USA)	Nancy Reynolds (USA)
Kansas City Hot Winter Nights; Kansas City, Missouri; US$12,500; January 12	Rachel Wacholder (USA)	Jenny Johnson Jordan (USA)	Holly McPeak (USA)	Nancy Reynolds (USA)
Milwaukee Hot Winter Nights; Milwaukee, Wisconsin; US$12,500; January 17	Annett Davis (USA)	Holly McPeak (USA)	Tyra Turner (USA)	Carrie Dodd (USA)
Madison Hot Winter Nights; Madison, Wisconsin; US$12,500; January 18	Tyra Turner (USA)	Carrie Dodd (USA)	Annett Davis (USA)	Holly McPeak (USA)
La Crosse Hot Winter Nights; La Crosse, Wisconsin; US$12,500; January 19	Carrie Dodd (USA)	Tyra Turner (USA)	Holly McPeak (USA)	Annett Davis (USA)
Minneapolis Hot Winter Nights; Minneapolis, Minnesota; US$12,500; January 24	Barbra Fontana (USA)	Dianne DeNecochea (USA)	April Ross (USA)	Rachel Wacholder (USA)
Columbus Hot Winter Nights; Columbus, Ohio; US$12,500; January 26	April Ross (USA)	Barbra Fontana (USA)	Rachel Wacholder (USA)	Dianne DeNecochea (USA)
Albany Hot Winter Nights; Albany, New York; US$12,500; January 30	Rachel Wacholder (USA)	Tyra Turner (USA)	Jennifer Kessy (USA)	Barbra Fontana (USA)
Trenton Hot Winter Nights; Trenton, New Jersey; US$12,500; January 31	Rachel Wacholder (USA)	Tyra Turner (USA)	Barbra Fontana (USA)	Jennifer Kessy (USA)
Norfolk Hot Winter Nights; Norfolk, Virginia; US$12,500; February 1	Jennifer Kessy (USA)	Barbra Fontana (USA)	Rachel Wacholder (USA)	Tyra Turner (USA)
Charlottesville Hot Winter Nights; Charlottesville, Virginia; US$12,500; February 2	Tyra Turner (USA)	Barbra Fontana (USA)	Rachel Wacholder (USA)	Jennifer Kessy (USA)
Omaha Hot Winter Nights; Omaha, Nebraska; US$12,500; February 7	Jenny Kropp (USA)	Holly McPeak (USA)	Angela Lewis (USA)	Angie Akers (USA)
Rosemont Hot Winter Nights; Rosemont, Illinois; US$12,500; February 8	Jenny Kropp (USA)	Angie Akers (USA)	Holly McPeak (USA)	Angela Lewis (USA)
Bloomington Hot Winter Nights; Bloomington, Illinois; US$12,500; February 9	Holly McPeak (USA)	Angie Akers (USA)	Angela Lewis (USA)	Jenny Kropp (USA)
Spokane Hot Winter Nights; Spokane, Washington; US$12,500; February 13	April Ross (USA)	Annett Davis (USA)	Jennifer Kessy (USA)	Dianne DeNecochea (USA)
Everett Hot Winter Nights; Everett, Washington; US$12,500; February 14	April Ross (USA)	Dianne DeNecochea (USA)	Annett Davis (USA)	Jennifer Kessy (USA)
Portland Hot Winter Nights; Portland, Oregon; US$12,500; February 16	April Ross (USA)	Jennifer Kessy (USA)	Dianne DeNecochea (USA)	Annett Davis (USA)
Las Vegas Hot Winter Nights; Las Vegas, Nevada; US$12,500; February 23	Nicole Branagh (USA)	Elaine Youngs (USA)	April Ross (USA)	Jenny Johnson Jordan (USA)

=== Crocs Tour ===
This is the complete schedule of events on the 2008 AVP Crocs Tour calendar, with team progression documented from the semifinals stage. All tournaments, with the exception of the Glendale Best of the Beach Invitational, consisted of single-elimination qualifying rounds followed by a double-elimination main draw. The Glendale Best of the Beach Invitational was a round-robin tournament.

Key

Cuervo Gold Crown
Crocs Slam
Crocs Cup Shootout
Best of the Beach Invitational

==== Men ====
Tournament	Champions	Runners-up	Semifinalist #1	Semifinalist #2
Cuervo Gold Crown Miami Open; Miami, Florida; US$100,000; April 10–13	Phil Dalhausser (USA); Todd Rogers (USA); 21-14, 21-13 (0:48)	Nick Lucena (USA); Sean Scott (USA)	Matt Fuerbringer (USA); Casey Jennings (USA)	Anthony Medel (USA); Fred Souza (BRA)
Cuervo Gold Crown Dallas Open; Dallas, Texas; US$100,000; April 17–20	Phil Dalhausser (USA); Todd Rogers (USA); 16-21, 21-16, 15-12 (1:00)	Jake Gibb (USA); Sean Rosenthal (USA)	Matt Fuerbringer (USA); Casey Jennings (USA)	Aaron Wachtfogel (USA); Mark Williams (AUS)
Cuervo Gold Crown Huntington Beach Open; Huntington Beach, California; US$100,000; May 1–3	Phil Dalhausser (USA); Todd Rogers (USA); 21-14, 22-20 (0:46)	John Hyden (USA); Brad Keenan (USA)	Matt Fuerbringer (USA); Casey Jennings (USA)	Stein Metzger (USA); Mark Williams (AUS)
Charleston Beach Open; Charleston, South Carolina; US$100,000; May 8–10	Phil Dalhausser (USA); Todd Rogers (USA); 21-19, 21-12 (0:41)	Stein Metzger (USA); Mark Williams (AUS)	Jason Ring (USA); Aaron Wachtfogel (USA)	Matt Olson (USA); Kevin Wong (USA)
Louisville Open presented by Kentucky Unbridled Spirit; Louisville, Kentucky; US$100,000; May 24–26	Phil Dalhausser (USA); Todd Rogers (USA); 22-20, 17-21, 15-13 (1:10)	John Hyden (USA); Brad Keenan (USA)	Matt Olson (USA); Kevin Wong (USA)	Nick Lucena (USA); Sean Scott (USA)
Atlanta Open; Atlanta, Georgia; US$100,000; May 30 – June 1	Jake Gibb (USA); Sean Rosenthal (USA); 18-21, 21-15, 15-10 (1:15)	Anthony Medel (USA); Fred Souza (BRA)	Phil Dalhausser (USA); Todd Rogers (USA)	John Hyden (USA); Brad Keenan (USA)
Hermosa Beach Open presented by Bud Light; Hermosa Beach, California; US$100,000; June 5–8	Phil Dalhausser (USA); Todd Rogers (USA); 21-14, 25-23 (1:07)	Matt Fuerbringer (USA); Casey Jennings (USA)	John Mayer (USA); Jeff Nygaard (USA)	Matt Olson (USA); Kevin Wong (USA)
Belmar Beach Open presented by Bud Light; Belmar, New Jersey; US$100,000; June 20–22	Matt Olson (USA); Kevin Wong (USA); 22-20, 21-15 (0:50)	Nick Lucena (USA); Sean Scott (USA)	Anthony Medel (USA); Fred Souza (BRA)	John Hyden (USA); Brad Keenan (USA)
Boulder Beach Open presented by Bud Light; Boulder, Colorado; US$105,000; July 4–5	Stein Metzger (USA); Mark Williams (AUS); 21-17, 21-15 (0:52)	Anthony Medel (USA); Fred Souza (BRA)	Aaron Wachtfogel (USA); Scott Wong (USA)	Nick Lucena (USA); Sean Scott (USA)
McDonald's Chicago Open presented by Nautica; Chicago, Illinois; US$105,000; July 10–12	Phil Dalhausser (USA); Todd Rogers (USA); 21-13, 21-15 (0:57)	Jake Gibb (USA); Sean Rosenthal (USA)	John Hyden (USA); Brad Keenan (USA)	Nick Lucena (USA); Sean Scott (USA)
Brooklyn Open presented by Cushman and Wakefield; Brooklyn, New York; US$105,000; July 18–19	Phil Dalhausser (USA); Todd Rogers (USA); 21-16, 21-12 (0:59)	Nick Lucena (USA); Sean Scott (USA)	John Hyden (USA); Brad Keenan (USA)	Stein Metzger (USA); Mark Williams (AUS)
Bud Light Long Beach Open; Long Beach, California; US$105,000; July 24–26	Jake Gibb (USA); Sean Rosenthal (USA); 21-14, 21-14 (1:01)	Phil Dalhausser (USA); Todd Rogers (USA)	Nick Lucena (USA); Sean Scott (USA)	Dax Holdren (USA); Bill Strickland (USA)
San Diego Open; San Diego, California; US$105,000; August 1–3	Matt Fuerbringer (USA); Casey Jennings (USA); 19-21, 21-17, 15-11 (1:19)	Nick Lucena (USA); Sean Scott (USA)	Pedro Brazao (BRA); José Loiola (BRA)	Russ Marchewka (USA); Mike Placek (CZE)
Cincinnati Open presented by Bud Light; Mason, Ohio; US$100,000; August 29–31	Phil Dalhausser (USA); Todd Rogers (USA); 21-15, 21-19 (0:57)	Nick Lucena (USA); Sean Scott (USA)	Jake Gibb (USA); Sean Rosenthal (USA)	Matt Fuerbringer (USA); Casey Jennings (USA)
Santa Barbara Open presented by Bud Light; Santa Barbara, California; US$100,000; September 6–7	Phil Dalhausser (USA); Todd Rogers (USA); 16-21, 21-19, 20-18 (1:18)	John Hyden (USA); Brad Keenan (USA)	Nick Lucena (USA); Sean Scott (USA)	Jake Gibb (USA); Sean Rosenthal (USA)
San Francisco Open presented by Fuze Beverage; San Francisco, California; US$100,000; September 12–14	Jake Gibb (USA); Sean Rosenthal (USA); 11-21, 21-19, 15-13 (1:21)	Phil Dalhausser (USA); Todd Rogers (USA)	John Hyden (USA); Brad Keenan (USA)	Stein Metzger (USA); Mark Williams (AUS)
Manhattan Beach Open presented by Bud Light; Manhattan Beach, California; US$500,000; September 17–21	Phil Dalhausser (USA); Todd Rogers (USA); 21-16, 21-16 (0:58)	Nick Lucena (USA); Sean Scott (USA)	Matt Olson (USA); Kevin Wong (USA)	Matt Fuerbringer (USA); Casey Jennings (USA)
Sanderson Ford Glendale Best of the Beach presented by RideNow Powersports; Glendale, Arizona; US$100,000; September 25–27	John Hyden (USA); 21-17, 21-17 (1:00)	Jake Gibb (USA)	Phil Dalhausser (USA)	Sean Rosenthal (USA)

==== Women ====
Tournament	Champions	Runners-up	Semifinalist #1	Semifinalist #2
Cuervo Gold Crown Miami Open; Miami, Florida; US$100,000; April 10–13	Misty May-Treanor (USA); Kerri Walsh Jennings (USA); 21-15, 17-21, 15-13 (1:02)	Nicole Branagh (USA); Elaine Youngs (USA)	Jennifer Kessy (USA); April Ross (USA)	Rachel Wacholder (USA); Tyra Turner (USA)
Cuervo Gold Crown Dallas Open; Dallas, Texas; US$100,000; April 17–20	Misty May-Treanor (USA); Kerri Walsh Jennings (USA); 17-21, 21-14, 15-13 (1:04)	Nicole Branagh (USA); Elaine Youngs (USA)	Annett Davis (USA); Jenny Johnson Jordan (USA)	Jennifer Kessy (USA); April Ross (USA)
Cuervo Gold Crown Huntington Beach Open; Huntington Beach, California; US$100,000; May 1–3	Misty May-Treanor (USA); Kerri Walsh Jennings (USA); 21-17, 22-20 (0:44)	Rachel Wacholder (USA); Tyra Turner (USA)	Nicole Branagh (USA); Elaine Youngs (USA)	Annett Davis (USA); Jenny Johnson Jordan (USA)
Charleston Beach Open; Charleston, South Carolina; US$100,000; May 8–10	Nicole Branagh (USA); Elaine Youngs (USA); 21-17, 22-20 (0:44)	Jennifer Kessy (USA); April Ross (USA)	Rachel Wacholder (USA); Tyra Turner (USA)	Dianne DeNecochea (USA); Barbra Fontana (USA)
Louisville Open presented by Kentucky Unbridled Spirit; Louisville, Kentucky; US$100,000; May 24–26	Misty May-Treanor (USA); Kerri Walsh Jennings (USA); 21-14, 21-11 (0:41)	Annett Davis (USA); Jenny Johnson Jordan (USA)	Carrie Dodd (USA); Tatiana Minello (BRA)	Katie Jameson (USA); Tracy Jones (USA)
Atlanta Open; Atlanta, Georgia; US$100,000; May 30 – June 1	Misty May-Treanor (USA); Kerri Walsh Jennings (USA); 21-7, 21-17 (0:42)	Annett Davis (USA); Jenny Johnson Jordan (USA)	Jenny Kropp (USA); Nancy Reynolds (USA)	Angie Akers (USA); Holly McPeak (USA)
Hermosa Beach Open presented by Bud Light; Hermosa Beach, California; US$100,000; June 5–7	Misty May-Treanor (USA); Kerri Walsh Jennings (USA); 21-16, 21-14 (0:44)	Annett Davis (USA); Jenny Johnson Jordan (USA)	Carrie Dodd (USA); Tatiana Minello (BRA)	Nicole Branagh (USA); Elaine Youngs (USA)
Belmar Beach Open presented by Bud Light; Belmar, New Jersey; US$100,000; June 20–22	Annett Davis (USA); Jenny Johnson Jordan (USA); 15-21, 21-18, 15-10 (1:14)	Carrie Dodd (USA); Tatiana Minello (BRA)	Dianne DeNecochea (USA); Barbra Fontana (USA)	Katie Jameson (USA); Tracy Jones (USA)
Boulder Beach Open presented by Bud Light; Boulder, Colorado; US$105,000; July 4–6	Misty May-Treanor (USA); Kerri Walsh Jennings (USA); 24-22, 21-14 (0:54)	Annett Davis (USA); Jenny Johnson Jordan (USA)	Carrie Dodd (USA); Tatiana Minello (BRA)	Dianne DeNecochea (USA); Barbra Fontana (USA)
McDonald's Chicago Open presented by Nautica; Chicago, Illinois; US$105,000; July 10–13	Misty May-Treanor (USA); Kerri Walsh Jennings (USA); 18-21, 21-17, 15-12 (1:26)	Nicole Branagh (USA); Elaine Youngs (USA)	Annett Davis (USA); Jenny Johnson Jordan (USA)	Jennifer Kessy (USA); April Ross (USA)
Brooklyn Open presented by Cushman and Wakefield; Brooklyn, New York; US$105,000; July 18–20	Misty May-Treanor (USA); Kerri Walsh Jennings (USA); 21-14, 21-15 (1:01)	Jennifer Kessy (USA); April Ross (USA)	Rachel Wacholder (USA); Tyra Turner (USA)	Dianne DeNecochea (USA); Barbra Fontana (USA)
Bud Light Long Beach Open; Long Beach, California; US$105,000; July 24–27	Misty May-Treanor (USA); Kerri Walsh Jennings (USA); 21-14, 21-18 (0:59)	Jennifer Kessy (USA); April Ross (USA)	Angie Akers (USA); Holly McPeak (USA)	Nicole Branagh (USA); Elaine Youngs (USA)
San Diego Open; San Diego, California; US$105,000; August 1–3	Rachel Wacholder (USA); Tyra Turner (USA); 21-16, 19-21, 15-10 (1:01)	Annett Davis (USA); Jenny Johnson Jordan (USA)	Angie Akers (USA); Holly McPeak (USA)	Jennifer Kessy (USA); April Ross (USA)
Cincinnati Open presented by Bud Light; Mason, Ohio; US$100,000; August 29–31	Nicole Branagh (USA); Elaine Youngs (USA); 21-19, 10-21, 25-23 (1:45)	Misty May-Treanor (USA); Kerri Walsh Jennings (USA)	Jennifer Kessy (USA); April Ross (USA)	Annett Davis (USA); Jenny Johnson Jordan (USA)
Santa Barbara Open presented by Bud Light; Santa Barbara, California; US$100,000; September 6–7	Annett Davis (USA); Jenny Johnson Jordan (USA); 21-16, 24-22 (0:56)	Jennifer Kessy (USA); April Ross (USA)	Nicole Branagh (USA); Elaine Youngs (USA)	Misty May-Treanor (USA); Kerri Walsh Jennings (USA)
San Francisco Open presented by Fuze Beverage; San Francisco, California; US$100,000; September 12–14	Misty May-Treanor (USA); Kerri Walsh Jennings (USA); 21-16, 21-12 (0:46)	Nicole Branagh (USA); Elaine Youngs (USA)	Jennifer Kessy (USA); April Ross (USA)	Annett Davis (USA); Jenny Johnson Jordan (USA)
Manhattan Beach Open presented by Bud Light; Manhattan Beach, California; US$500,000; September 17–20	Misty May-Treanor (USA); Kerri Walsh Jennings (USA); 21-18, 21-16 (0:55)	Jennifer Kessy (USA); April Ross (USA)	Annett Davis (USA); Jenny Johnson Jordan (USA)	Nicole Branagh (USA); Elaine Youngs (USA)
Sanderson Ford Glendale Best of the Beach presented by RideNow Powersports; Glendale, Arizona; US$100,000; September 25–27	Jennifer Kessy (USA); 19-21, 21-17, 15-10 (1:13)	Nicole Branagh (USA)	Kerri Walsh Jennings (USA)	Annett Davis (USA)

== Milestones and events ==
Cincinnati Open

- Misty May-Treanor and Kerri Walsh Jennings lost 19-21, 21-10, 23-25 to Nicole Branagh and Elaine Youngs in the finals, ending their record win streak of 112 consecutive matches and 19 straight tournaments that began in August 2007. The match lasted 1 hour and 45 minutes and was the second-longest women's match in AVP history at the time.

== Awards ==
Award	Men	Women
Best blocker	Phil Dalhausser (USA)	Kerri Walsh Jennings (USA)
Best Defensive Player	Nick Lucena (USA); Todd Rogers (USA)	Misty May-Treanor (USA)
Best Offensive Player	Phil Dalhausser (USA)	Misty May-Treanor (USA)
Most Improved Player	Nick Lucena (USA)	Nicole Branagh (USA)
Rookie of the Year	Pedro Brazao (BRA)	Whitney Pavlik (USA)
Most valuable player	Phil Dalhausser (USA)	Misty May-Treanor (USA)
Team of the Year	Phil Dalhausser (USA); Todd Rogers (USA)	Misty May-Treanor (USA); Kerri Walsh Jennings (USA)
