= United States national beach volleyball team =

Beach volleyball team

The United States national beach volleyball team participates in international beach volleyball competitions and is governed by USA Volleyball.

== Tournament record ==
=== Summer Olympics ===
Summer Olympics record
Year	U.S. Women's Beach Finishes	U.S. Men's Beach Finishes
1996	did not medal	(gold) Gold (Karch Kiraly and Kent Steffes); Silver (Mike Dodd and Mike Whitmarsh)
2000	did not medal	(gold) Gold (Dain Blanton and Eric Fonoimoana)
2004	(gold) Gold (Misty May-Treanor and Kerri Walsh)	did not medal
2008	(gold) Gold (Misty May-Treanor and Kerri Walsh)	(gold) Gold (Phil Dalhausser and Todd Rogers)
2012	(gold) Gold (Misty May-Treanor and Kerri Walsh); Silver (April Ross and Jennifer Kessy)	did not medal
2016	(bronze) Bronze (April Ross and Kerri Walsh-Jennings)	did not medal
2020	(gold) Gold (April Ross and Alix Klineman)	did not medal
2024	did not medal	did not medal

=== World Championship ===
World Championship record
Year	U.S. Women's Beach Finishes	U.S. Men's Beach Finishes
1997	(silver) Silver (Lisa Arce and Holly McPeak)	(silver) Silver (Canyon Ceman and Mike Whitmarsh); (bronze) Bronze (Dain Blanton and Kent Steffes)
1999	(silver) Silver (Annett Davis and Jenny Johnson Jordan); (bronze) Bronze (Liz Masakayan and Elaine Youngs)	did not medal
2001	did not medal	did not medal
2003	(gold) Gold (Misty May-Treanor and Kerri Walsh)	(silver) Silver (Dax Holdren and Stein Metzger)
2005	(gold) Gold (Misty May-Treanor and Kerri Walsh)	did not medal
2007	(gold) Gold (Misty May-Treanor and Kerri Walsh)	(gold) Gold (Phil Dalhausser and Todd Rogers)
2009	(gold) Gold (Jennifer Kessy and April Ross)	(bronze) Bronze (Phil Dalhausser and Todd Rogers)
2011	(silver) Silver (Misty May-Treanor and Kerri Walsh)	did not medal
2013	did not medal	did not medal
2015	did not medal	did not medal
2017	(silver) Silver (Lauren Fendrick and April Ross)	did not medal
2019	(silver) Silver (Alix Klineman and April Ross)	did not medal
2022	did not medal	did not medal
2023	(gold) Gold (Sara Hughes and Kelly Cheng); (bronze) Bronze (Kristen Nuss and Taryn Kloth-Brasher)	did not medal
2025	(silver) Silver (Kristen Nuss and Taryn Kloth-Brasher)	did not medal

=== Pan American Games ===
Year	U.S. Women's Beach Finishes	U.S. Men's Beach Finishes
1999	(silver) Silver (Jenny Pavley and Marsha Miller)	did not medal
2003	did not medal	did not medal
2007	did not medal	(silver) Silver (Ty Loomis / Hans Stolfus)
2011	did not medal	did not medal
2015	did not medal	did not medal
2019	(gold) Gold (Karissa Cook and Jace Pardon)	did not medal
2023	(bronze) Bronze (Corinne Quiggle and Sarah Murphy)	did not medal

== Current women's roster ==
Beach National Team as of February 12, 2026:

Name	Birth date and age	Height	Hometown	College
Taryn Brasher	April 10, 1997 (age 28)	6 ft 4 in (1.92 m)	Sioux Falls, South Dakota	Creighton/LSU
Terese Cannon	October 1, 1995 (age 30)	6 ft 3 in (1.90 m)	Pittsford, New York	USC
Kelly Cheng	September 18, 1995 (age 30)	6 ft 2 in (1.88 m)	Placentia, California	USC
Kylie Deberg	March 30, 1999 (age 26)	6 ft 4 in (1.93 m)	Hudson, Iowa	Illinois/Missouri/LSU
Lexy Denaburg	June 6, 2001 (age 24)	6 ft 0 in (1.83 m)	Merritt Island, Florida	UCLA
Betsi Flint	August 13, 1992 (age 33)	5 ft 10 in (1.79 m)	Phoenix, Arizona	Loyola Marymount
Hailey Harward	March 19, 1998 (age 27)	5 ft 9 in (1.76 m)	Long Beach, California	Long Beach State/USC
Xolani Hodel	June 15, 2002 (age 23)	6 ft 1 in (1.85 m)	Huntington Beach, California	Stanford
Sara Hughes	February 14, 1995 (age 30)	5 ft 10 in (1.79 m)	Costa Mesa, California	USC
Kelley Larsen Kolinske	May 3, 1992 (age 33)	6 ft 2 in (1.87 m)	San Diego, California	Pepperdine
Megan Kraft	September 27, 2002 (age 23)	6 ft 0 in (1.83 m)	San Diego, California	USC
Kristen Nuss	December 16, 1997 (age 28)	5 ft 6 in (1.68 m)	New Orleans, Louisiana	LSU
Molly Phillips	January 31, 2001 (age 25)	6 ft 5 in (1.95 m)	Mansfield, Texas	Texas/USC
Corinne Quiggle	December 20, 1992 (age 33)	5 ft 10 in (1.79 m)	Ponte Vedra Beach, Florida	Pepperdine
Toni Rodriguez	September 13, 1996 (age 29)	6 ft 1 in (1.85 m)	St. Amant, Louisiana	LSU
Julia Scoles Donlin	June 14, 1997 (age 28)	6 ft 1 in (1.85 m)	Mooresville, North Carolina	North Carolina/Hawaii/USC
Molly Shaw	June 23, 1996 (age 29)	5 ft 8 in (1.73 m)	Redondo Beach, California	Grand Canyon
Abby Van Winkle	October 13, 1999 (age 26)	6 ft 2 in (1.88 m)	San Clemente, California	UCLA

== Current men's roster ==
Beach National Team as of February 12, 2026:

Name	Birth date and age	Height	Hometown	College	Ref.
Andy Benesh	March 14, 1995 (age 30)	6 ft 9 in (2.06 m)	Rancho Palos Verdes, California	USC	
Derek Bradford	May 2, 2004 (age 21)	6 ft 9 in (2.06 m)	Northridge, California	Hawaii	
Chase Budinger	May 22, 1988 (age 37)	6 ft 7 in (2.01 m)	Encinitas, California	Arizona	
Cody Caldwell	March 28, 1993 (age 32)	6 ft 6 in (1.98 m)	Newport Beach, California	Loyola	
Evan Cory	November 14, 1997 (age 28)	6 ft 4 in (1.92 m)	Metairie, Louisiana	Lincoln Memorial	
Taylor Crabb	January 26, 1992 (age 34)	6 ft 0 in (1.83 m)	Honolulu, Hawaii	Long Beach State	
Trevor Crabb	September 5, 1989 (age 36)	6 ft 5 in (1.96 m)	Honolulu, Hawaii	Puget Sound/Long Beach State	
Miles Evans	November 12, 1989 (age 36)	6 ft 4 in (1.92 m)	Santa Barbara, California	UC Santa Barbara	
Wyatt Harrison	June 27, 1999 (age 26)	6 ft 6 in (1.97 m)	Santa Cruz, California	UC San Diego	
Jacob LaBouliere	2002 (age 23–24)	6 ft 9 in (2.05 m)	Pipersville, Pennsylvania	Wentworth	
Miles Partain	December 18, 2001 (age 24)	6 ft 3 in (1.91 m)	Pacific Palisades, California	UCLA	
Chaim Schalk	April 23, 1986 (age 39)	6 ft 5 in (1.96 m)	Red Deer, Canada	Red Deer/Trinity Western	
James Shaw	March 5, 1994 (age 31)	6 ft 8 in (2.03 m)	Woodside, California	Stanford	
Charlie Siragusa	February 20, 1999 (age 26)	6 ft 9 in (2.05 m)	Rochester, New York	BYU/UC San Diego	
Logan Webber	October 29, 1995 (age 30)	6 ft 7 in (2.01 m)	Grand Rapids, Michigan	Cincinnati Christian	

== See also ==
- United States men's national volleyball team
- United States women's national volleyball team
