= List of American beach volleyball players =

The following is a list of notable beach volleyball players in the United States:

- Dain Blanton
- Nicole Branagh
- Phil Dalhausser
- Emily Day
- Mike Dodd
- Lauren Fendrick
- Eric Fonoimoana
- Jennifer Fopma
- Brent Frohoff
- Matt Fuerbringer
- Jake Gibb
- Sara Hughes
- Casey Jennings
- Jenny Johnson Jordan
- Jennifer Kessy
- Karch Kiraly
- Karolyn Kirby
- Alix Klineman
- Mike Lambert
- Misty May-Treanor
- Holly McPeak
- Stein Metzger
- Jeff Nygaard
- Casey Patterson
- Gabrielle Reece
- Todd Rogers
- Sean Rosenthal
- April Ross
- Summer Ross
- Eugene Selznick
- Sinjin Smith
- Randy Stoklos
- Brooke Sweat
- Rachel Wacholder
- Kerri Walsh Jennings
- Aaron Wexler
- Mike Whitmarsh
- Kevin Wong
- Elaine Youngs
