= Swatch FIVB World Tour 2004 =

Tournament details
- Host country: Various
- Dates: March–September, 2004

The Swatch FIVB World Tour 2004 was the official international beach volleyball tour for that year.

The USA won seven women's tournaments, while Brazil won five, out of the 12 women's tournaments on the 2004 tour. For the men's tournaments, Brazil won nine of the 14 tournaments.

== Grand Slam ==
There were three Grand Slam tournaments. These events give a higher number of points and more money than the rest of the tournaments.

- Berlin, Germany – Smart Grand Slam, June 22–27, 2004
- Marseille, France – World Series 13, July 13–18, 2004
- Klagenfurt, Austria – A1 Grand Slam presented by Nokia, 29 July – 1 August 2004

== Schedule ==
Key

Olympic Games
Grand Slam
Open tournaments

== Tournament results ==
=== Women ===
Tournament	Champions	Runners-up	Third place	Fourth place
Ceará Open; Fortaleza, Brazil; US$180,000; 09–14 March 2004	Kerri Walsh Jennings (USA); Misty May-Treanor (USA); 21-18, 21–10	Adriana Behar (BRA); Shelda Bede (BRA)	Juliana Silva (BRA); Larissa França (BRA); 24–22, 21–9	Tian Jia (CHN); Wang Fei (CHN)
Hellas Open; Rhodes, Greece; US$180,000; 19–23 May 2004	Kerri Walsh Jennings (USA); Misty May-Treanor (USA); 21–17, 21–13	Holly McPeak (USA); Elaine Youngs (USA)	Adriana Behar (BRA); Shelda Bede (BRA); 23–25, 21–16, 15–11	Annett Davis (USA); Jenny Johnson Jordan (USA)
China Jinshan Open; Shanghai, China; US$180,000; 26–30 May 2004	Holly McPeak (USA); Elaine Youngs (USA); 21-17, 21–13	Annett Davis (USA); Jenny Johnson Jordan (USA)	Adriana Behar (BRA); Shelda Bede (BRA); 24-22, 21–17	Wang Lu (CHN); You Wenhui (CHN)
Japan Open; Osaka, Japan; US$180,000; 2–6 June 2004	Adriana Behar (BRA); Shelda Bede (BRA); 21–12, retired	Natalie Cook (AUS); Nicole Sanderson (AUS)	Simone Kuhn (SUI); Nicole Schnyder-Benoit (SUI); 21–13, 21–14	Effrosyni Sfyri (GRE); Vasso Karantasiou (GRE)
1to1 Energy Open; Gstaad, Switzerland; US$180,000; 15–19 June 2004	Kerri Walsh Jennings (USA); Misty May-Treanor (USA); 26–28, 21–17, 15–10	Adriana Behar (BRA); Shelda Bede (BRA)	Holly McPeak (USA); Elaine Youngs (USA) walkover	Ana Paula Connelly (BRA); Sandra Pires (BRA)
Smart Grand Slam; Berlin, Germany; US$300,000; 22–26 June 2004	Adriana Behar (BRA); Shelda Bede (BRA); 21–16, 21–17	Dalixia Fernandez Grasset (CUB); Tamara Larrea Peraza (CUB)	Holly McPeak (USA); Elaine Youngs (USA); 21–13, 21–16	Susanne Lahme (GER); Danja Müsch (GER)
ConocoPhilips Open; Stavanger, Norway; US$180,000; 29 June – 3 July 2004	Holly McPeak (USA); Elaine Youngs (USA); 21–17, 16–21, 15–10	Annett Davis (USA); Jenny Johnson Jordan (USA)	Kerri Walsh Jennings (USA); Rachel Wacholder (USA); 18–21, 21–18, 15–11	Guylaine Dumont (CAN); Annie Martin (CAN)
Mallorca Open; Mallorca, Spain; US$180,000; 06–10 July 2004	Juliana Silva (BRA); Larissa França (BRA); 21–17, 21–12	Susanne Lahme (GER); Danja Müsch (GER)	Soňa Nováková (CZE); Eva Celbová-Ryšavá (CZE); 21–14, 19–21, 18–16	Summer Lochowicz (AUS); Kerri Pottharst (AUS)
World Series 13; Marseille, France; US$280,000; 13–18 July 2004	Kerri Walsh Jennings (USA); Rachel Wacholder (USA); 21–19, 21–18	Annett Davis (USA); Jenny Johnson Jordan (USA)	Juliana Silva (BRA); Larissa França (BRA); 21–23, 21–19, 17–15	Carrie Dodd (USA); Nancy Mason Reynolds (USA)
A1 Grand Slam; Klagenfurt, Austria; US$270,000; 29–31 July 2004	Kerri Walsh Jennings (USA); Rachel Wacholder (USA); 21–13, 21–7	Adriana Behar (BRA); Shelda Bede (BRA)	Annett Davis (USA); Jenny Johnson Jordan (USA); 21–17, 13–21, 18–16	Holly McPeak (USA); Elaine Youngs (USA)
XXVIII Olympic Games; Athens, Greece; 14–24 August 2004	Kerri Walsh Jennings (USA); Misty May-Treanor (USA); 21–17, 21–11	Adriana Behar (BRA); Shelda Bede (BRA)	Holly McPeak (USA); Elaine Youngs (USA); 21–18, 15–21, 15–9	Natalie Cook (AUS); Nicole Sanderson (AUS)
Alice Italian Open; Milan, Italy; US$180,000; 1–5 September 2004	Adriana Behar (BRA); Shelda Bede (BRA); 21–15, 21–13	Renata Ribeiro (BRA); Shaylyn Bede (BRA)	Soňa Nováková (CZE); Eva Celbová-Ryšavá (CZE); 21–15, 21–18	Simone Kuhn (SUI); Nicole Schnyder-Benoit (SUI)
Banco do Brasil Open; Rio de Janeiro, Brazil; US$180,000; 20–25 September 2004	Ana Paula Connelly (BRA); Sandra Pires (BRA); 21-14, 28–26	Adriana Behar (BRA); Shelda Bede (BRA)	Juliana Silva (BRA); Larissa França (BRA); 21-16, 21–16	Ângela Lavalle (BRA); Mônica Paludo (BRA)

=== Men ===
Tournament	Champions	Runners-up	Third place	Fourth place
Salvador Open; Salvador, Brazil; US$180,000; 16–21 March 2004	Emanuel Rego (BRA); Ricardo Santos (BRA); 21-19, 21–18	Patrick Heuscher (SUI); Stefan Kobel (SUI)	Mariano Baracetti (ARG); Martín Conde (ARG) walkover	Markus Dieckmann (GER); Jonas Reckermann (GER)
South African Open; Cape Town, South Africa; US$180,000; 23–28 March 2004	Tande Ramos (BRA); Franco Neto (BRA); 27–25, 14–21, 15–12	Emanuel Rego (BRA); Ricardo Santos (BRA)	Harley Marques (BRA); Benjamin Insfran (BRA); 21–11, 21–15	Peter Gartmayer (AUT); Robert Nowotny (AUT)
Olympic Garden Open; Lianyungang, China; US$180,000; 19–23 May 2004	Javier Bosma (ESP); Pablo Herrera (ESP); 15–21, 21–19, 21–19	Emanuel Rego (BRA); Ricardo Santos (BRA)	Pedro Cunha (BRA); Rogério "Pará" Ferreira (BRA); 21–10, 21–17	Todd Rogers (USA); Sean Scott (USA)
NIS Open 2004; Budva, Serbia and Montenegro; US$180,000; 26–30 May 2004	Emanuel Rego (BRA); Ricardo Santos (BRA); 21-18, 21–19	Markus Dieckmann (GER); Jonas Reckermann (GER)	Patrick Heuscher (SUI); Stefan Kobel (SUI); 21-17, 21–18	Kristjan Kais (EST); Rivo Vesik (EST)
Portugal Open; Espinho, Portugal; US$180,000; 2–6 June 2004	Emanuel Rego (BRA); Ricardo Santos (BRA); 21-12, 22–20	Vegard Høidalen (NOR); Jørre Kjemperud (NOR)	Márcio Araújo (BRA); Benjamin Insfran (BRA); 21–16, 21–15	Markus Dieckmann (GER); Jonas Reckermann (GER)
Carolina Open; Carolina, Puerto Rico; US$180,000; 09–13 June 2004	Pedro Cunha (BRA); Rogério "Pará" Ferreira (BRA); 21-17, 35–33	Mariano Baracetti (ARG); Martín Conde (ARG)	Tande Ramos (BRA); Franco Neto (BRA); 22–20, 21–19	Dax Holdren (USA); Stein Metzger (USA)
1to1 Energy Open; Gstaad, Switzerland; US$180,000; 16–20 June 2004	Patrick Heuscher (SUI); Stefan Kobel (SUI); 21–18, 27–25	Markus Dieckmann (GER); Jonas Reckermann (GER)	Emanuel Rego (BRA); Ricardo Santos (BRA); 21–18, 21–16	Márcio Araújo (BRA); Benjamin Insfran (BRA)
Smart Grand Slam; Berlin, Germany; US$300,000; 23–27 June 2004	Markus Dieckmann (GER); Jonas Reckermann (GER); 20-22, 21–19, 16–14	Martin Laciga (SUI); Paul Laciga (SUI)	Mariano Baracetti (ARG); Martín Conde (ARG)} 21-12, 16–21, 15–12	Emanuel Rego (BRA); Ricardo Santos (BRA)
ConocoPhilips Open; Stavanger, Norway; US$180,000; 1–4 July 2004	Emanuel Rego (BRA); Ricardo Santos (BRA); 21–15, 21–17	David Klemperer (GER); Niklas Rademacher (GER)	Tande Ramos (BRA); Franco Neto (BRA); 18–21, 21–18, 15–10	Christoph Dieckmann (GER); Andreas Scheuerpflug (GER)
Mallorca Open; Mallorca, Spain; US$180,000; 07–11 July 2004	Patrick Heuscher (SUI); Stefan Kobel (SUI); 21-14, 21–13	Markus Egger (SUI); Sascha Heyer (SUI)	Fábio Luiz Magalhães (BRA); Paulo Emílio (BRA) walkover	Mariano Baracetti (ARG); Martín Conde (ARG)
World Series 13; Marseille, France; US$280,000; 14–18 July 2004	Márcio Araújo (BRA); Benjamin Insfran (BRA); 12–21, 22–20, 15–12	Patrick Heuscher (SUI); Stefan Kobel (SUI)	Mariano Baracetti (ARG); Martín Conde (ARG) walkover	Todd Rogers (USA); Sean Scott (USA)
Mazury Open; Stare Jablonki, Poland; US$180,000; 21–25 July 2004	Emanuel Rego (BRA); Ricardo Santos (BRA); 21–18, 21–16	Tande Ramos (BRA); Franco Neto (BRA)	Vegard Høidalen (NOR); Jørre Kjemperud (NOR); 19–21, 21–18, 21–19	Patrick Heuscher (SUI); Stefan Kobel (SUI)
A1 Grand Slam; Klagenfurt, Austria; US$270,000; 29 July – 1 August 2004	Emanuel Rego (BRA); Ricardo Santos (BRA); 17–21, 21–16, 15–10	Tande Ramos (BRA); Franco Neto (BRA)	Christoph Dieckmann (GER); Andreas Scheuerpflug (GER) walkover	Márcio Araújo (BRA); Benjamin Insfran (BRA)
XXVIII Olympic Games; Athens, Greece; 14–25 August 2004	Emanuel Rego (BRA); Ricardo Santos (BRA); 21-16, 21–15	Javier Bosma (ESP); Pablo Herrera (ESP)	Patrick Heuscher (SUI); Stefan Kobel (SUI); 19–21, 21–17, 15–13	Julien Prosser (AUS); Mark Williams (AUS)
Banco do Brasil Open; Rio de Janeiro, Brazil; US$180,000; 21–26 September 2004	Markus Dieckmann (GER); Jonas Reckermann (GER); 18–21, 21–19, 15–9	Patrick Heuscher (SUI); Stefan Kobel (SUI)	Markus Egger (SUI); Sascha Heyer (SUI); 17–21, 23–21, 17–15	Emanuel Rego (BRA); Ricardo Santos (BRA)

== Rankings ==
=== Men ===
Top 15 Rankings as of September 27, 2004.
Rank	Pair	Points
1	(Brazil) Emanuel Rego & Ricardo Santos	4'092
2	(Brazil) Tande Ramos & Franco Neto	3'222
3	(Switzerland) Patrick Heuscher & Stefan Kobel	2'970
4	(Argentina) Mariano Baracetti & Martín Conde	2,330
5	(Germany) Markus Dieckmann & Jonas Reckermann	2'860
6	(Brazil) Márcio Araújo & Benjamin Insfran	2'630
7	(Switzerland) Markus Egger & Sascha Heyer	2'408
8	(Switzerland) Martin Laciga & Paul Laciga	2'390
9	(Germany) Christoph Dieckmann & Andreas Scheuerpflug	2'040
10	(Australia) Andrew Schacht & Joshua Slack	1'964
11	(United States) Todd Rogers & Sean Scott	1'916
12	(Cuba) Francisco Álvarez & Juan Rossell	1'596
13	(Norway) Vegard Høidalen & Jørre Kjemperud	1,542
14	(Sweden) Björn Berg & Simon Dahl	1'552
15	(Australia) Julien Prosser & Mark Williams	1,384

=== Women ===
Top 15 Rankings as of September 27, 2004.
Rank	Pair	Points
1	(Brazil) Adriana Behar & Shelda Bede	3'354
2	(Brazil) Juliana Silva & Larissa França	2'568
3	(United States) Holly McPeak & Elaine Youngs	2'370
4	(United States) Annett Davis & Jenny Johnson Jordan	2'340
5	(Switzerland) Simone Kuhn & Nicole Schnyder-Benoit	2'286
6	(Germany) Susanne Lahme & Danja Musch	1'886
7	(Italy) Daniela Gattelli & Lucilla Perrotta	1'786
8	(Brazil) Renata Ribeiro & Shaylyn Bede	1'774
9	(Czech Republic) Soňa Nováková & Eva Celbová-Ryšavá	1'716
10	(Cuba) Tamara Larrea Peraza & Dalixia Fernandez Grasset	1'422
11	(United States) Kerri Walsh Jennings & Rachel Wacholder	1'388
12	(Germany) Stephanie Pohl & Okka Rau	1'348
13	(Australia) Summer Lochowicz & Kerri Pottharst	1'338
14	(Bulgaria) Lina Yanchulova & Petia Yanchulova	1'306
15	(Norway) Kathrine Maaseide & Susanne Glesnes	1'282

== Medal table by country ==
Rank	Nation	Gold	Silver	Bronze	Total
1	Brazil	15	10	12	37
2	United States	8	4	5	17
3	Switzerland	2	5	4	11
4	Germany	2	4	1	7
5	Spain	1	1	0	2
6	Argentina	0	1	3	4
7	Norway	0	1	1	2
8	Australia	0	1	0	1
8	Cuba	0	1	0	1
10	Czech Republic	0	0	2	2
Totals (10 entries)		28	28	28	84
