= Sean Scott (volleyball) =

American beach volleyball player

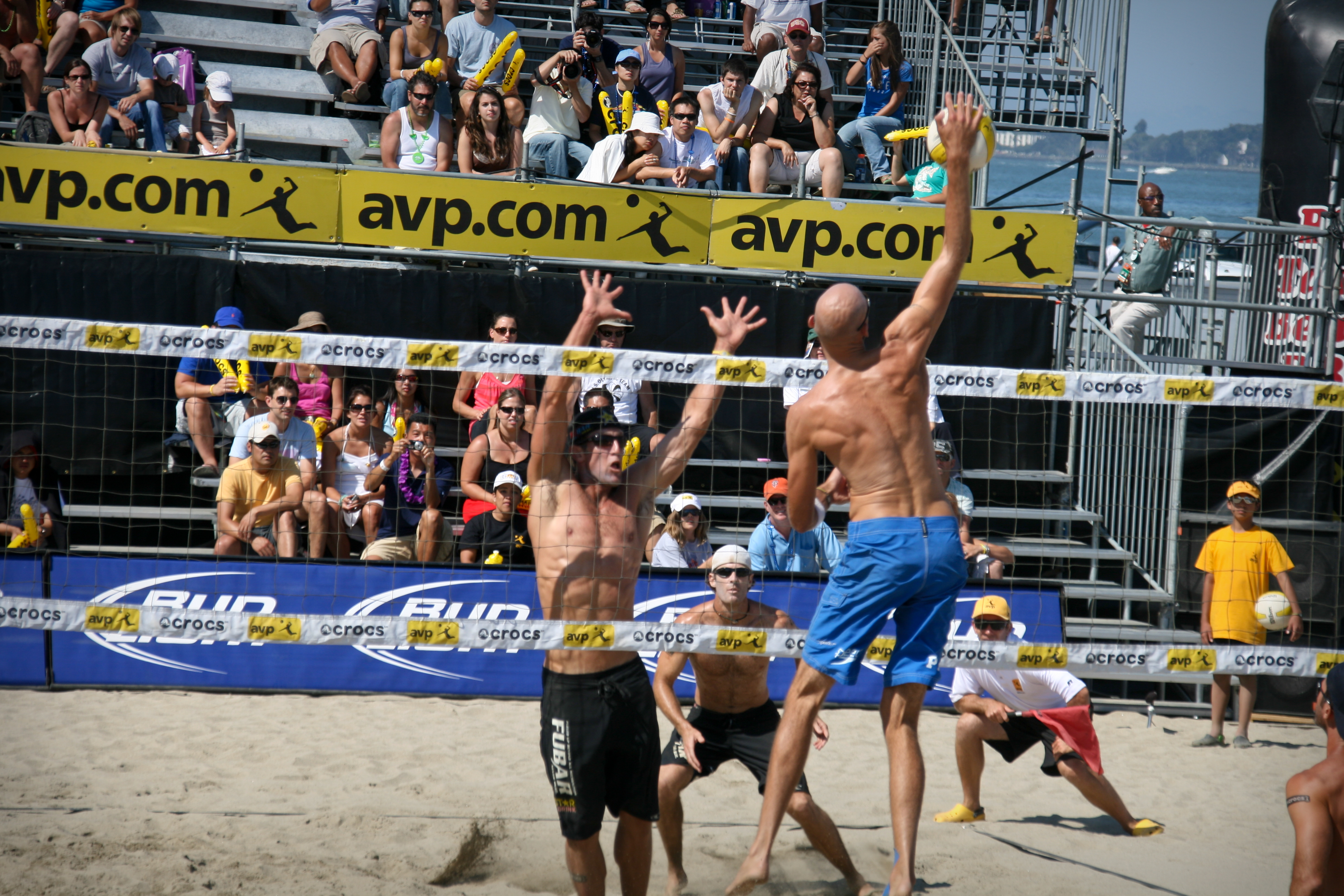
Sean Scott blocking at the 2009 AVP San Francisco Open finals

Sean Scott (born June 29, 1973) is a retired American professional beach volleyball player.

== Career ==
Scott started playing beach volleyball professionally in 1997 after playing collegiately at the University of Hawaiʻi from 1992 to 1995. He joined the Association of Volleyball Professionals Tour shortly afterwards and was named the 1999 AVP Tour Rookie of the Year. He's had several different partners throughout his career:

- 1997: Stein Metzger
- 2000: Sinjin Smith
- 2002–2005: Todd Rogers (among other partners)
- 2004: Mike Lambert
- 2006: Dax Holdren
- 2007: Matt Fuerbringer
- 2008: Nick Lucena
- 2009–2012: John Hyden

As he neared the end of his career, he was noted for having supreme physical fitness due to his training regimen and nutrition. Additionally, with the fall of the AVP in 2010, Scott had to find numerous other places to play which included a return to the FIVB Beach Volleyball World Tour and numerous other lesser-stature tours such as the National Volleyball League, Wide Open Beach Volleyball, and Pro Beach Volleyball Series. He continued participation in the various leagues upon the return of the AVP Tour, which resulted in winning 14 of the 19 domestic tournaments he played in, across four different tours, in 2011 and 2012.

== Personal life ==
Scott is married to fellow former beach volleyball player Rachel Wacholder.
