= Angie Akers =

American beach volleyball player (born 1976)

Personal information
- Full name: Angela Marie Harris Akers
- Nationality: United States
- Born: June 30, 1976 (age 50); Fort Wayne, Indiana, U.S.
- Height: 6 ft 0 in (183 cm)

Beach volleyball information

Current teammate
| Years | Teammate |
|---|---|
| 2011-2013 | Nicole Branagh |

Previous teammates
| Years | Teammate |
|---|---|
| 2009–2010; 2008; 2007; 2006 2005 2004; 2003; 2002 | Tyra Turner; Holly McPeak; Brooke Hanson; Nicole Branagh, Heather Lowe, Brooke Hanson; Kerri Pottharst, Jenny Pavley, Nicole Branagh; Sarah Straton, Rachel Wacholder; Sarah Straton; Jenny Pavley |
Medal record
Women's volleyball
Representing the United States
World Tour
| Silver medal – second place | 2009 Phuket | Beach |
| Silver medal – second place | 2010 Seoul | Beach |
| Bronze medal – third place | 2009 Sanya | Beach |
| Bronze medal – third place | 2010 Milner | Beach |

Angela Marie "Angie" Akers (née Harris; born June 30, 1976) is a retired professional beach volleyball player from the United States who played on the AVP Tour. Akers was named the AVP Rookie of the Year in 2002.

== Early life ==
Akers was born and raised in Fort Wayne, Indiana, and attended Bishop Luers High School.

== Athletic career ==
Akers played NCAA indoor volleyball for the University of Notre Dame and is the school's all-time career ace and kills leader. After graduating with a BA in Sociology, Akers played professional volleyball in Switzerland for three months. Upon returning home, she decided to give up volleyball and pursue a running career. Her highest accomplishment in running was finishing the 2001 Boston Marathon in 3 hours, 23 minutes.

Akers began her career in beach volleyball in 2002 after moving to Southern California from San Francisco, where she had been working at Lehman Brothers. Since then, Akers has earned $252,127 in prize money and has consistently finished in the top ten in individual and team categories. In July 2007 with Brooke Hanson as her partner, the pair represented the U.S. at the Pan American Games in Rio de Janeiro, Brazil, and finished fifth. In 2009 with Tyra Turner as her partner, the duo finished 5th at the FIVB World Championships in Stavanger, Norway.

== Personal life ==
Akers is married to Jeremy Akers, a former professional football player.

Awards
| Preceded by Bibiana Candelas (MEX) | Women's FIVB World Tour "Top Rookie" alongside (Australia) Louise Bawden; 2009 | Succeeded by Markéta Sluková (CZE) |
