= Holly McPeak =

American beach volleyball player

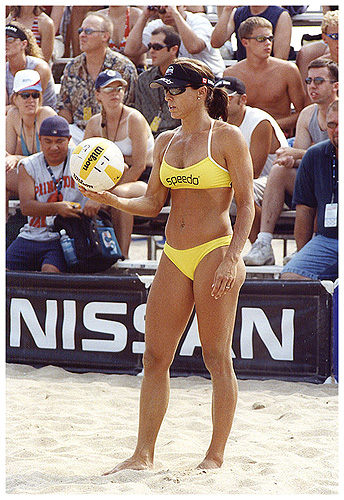
- McPeak in 2004

Personal information
- Full name: Holly McPeak
- Born: May 15, 1969 (age 57); Manhattan Beach, California, U.S.
- Hometown: Manhattan Beach, California, U.S.
- Height: 5 ft 7 in (1.70 m)
- Education: University of California; UCLA

Beach volleyball information
Years	Teammate
2009; 2008; 2007; 2006 2005; 2002–2004; 2001 2000; 1999 1997–1998; 1996; 1995; 1994; 1993; 1992; 1991; 1990; 1989; 1987–1988	Angie Akers & Jenny Kropp; Angie Akers; Logan Tom & 3 others Nicole Branagh, Logan Tom, Dianne DeNecochea; Jennifer Kessy; Elaine Youngs; Lisa Arce, Misty May-Treanor, Kerri Walsh; Misty May-Treanor; Nancy Reno, Gabrielle Reece, Misty May-Treanor, Karolyn Kirby; Lisa Arce; Nancy Reno & Lisa Arce; Reno & Angela Rock; Cammy Ciarelli; Rock, Ciarelli, Linda Chisholm, Reno; 6 partners Bonnie Fisk, then Barbra Fontana did not compete 2 partners Jill Horning
Medal record
Women's beach volleyball
Representing United States
Olympic Games
Bronze medal – third place	2004 Athens	Beach
World Championships
Silver medal – second place	1997 Los Angeles	Beach
World Tour
Gold medal – first place	2002 Stavanger	Beach
Gold medal – first place	2002 Marseille	Beach
Gold medal – first place	2002 Rhodes	Beach
Gold medal – first place	2002 Vitória	Beach
Gold medal – first place	2004 Shanghai	Beach
Gold medal – first place	2004 Stavanger	Beach
Silver medal – second place	2002 Maoming	Beach
Silver medal – second place	2003 Berlin	Beach
Silver medal – second place	2004 Rhodes	Beach
Bronze medal – third place	2002 Montreal	Beach
Bronze medal – third place	2002 Klagenfurt	Beach
Bronze medal – third place	2004 Gstaad	Beach
Bronze medal – third place	2004 Berlin	Beach

Holly McPeak (born May 15, 1969) is an American retired indoor and beach volleyball player. McPeak was three-times an Olympian in beach volleyball. In the professional circuit, she garnered 72 career beach volleyball titles, with career earnings of US$1.4 million. She is ranked third in titles won (behind Misty May-Treanor and Kerri Walsh) and second in career earnings (behind May-Treanor) for female professional beach volleyball players. She won a bronze medal at the 2004 Summer Olympics with partner Elaine Youngs. Though McPeak was considered short for a beach volleyball player at 5 feet 7 inches in height, she was one of the toughest players to beat on the tour.

== Early life and college career ==
McPeak was born and raised in Manhattan Beach, California. She attended Mira Costa High School. While there she was a member of two CIF 5-A champion volleyball teams. During her junior year in the fall of 1985 the Mustangs went undefeated en route to winning the state championship, finishing the season with a record of 29–0. In 1986 Mira Costa again went undefeated through the regular season and reached the championship match before losing in the finals to the Hueneme High School Vikings. The team finished with a 23–1 mark. Mira Costa head coach Dae Lea Aldrich, who had led the Mustangs to three state championships, two No. 1 national rankings, eight CIF titles and two state finals over a ten-year period, offered the following on McPeak: "She's a workaholic. She's a great athlete who will do anything you ask, and she'll do it twice as hard. She's the girl that does the extra mile and the extra lifting in the off season."

McPeak was a three-time All-Ocean League and All-Southern Section setter at Mira Costa. Though short in stature at 5'7", she was heavily recruited. Volleyball Monthly magazine called her "the most coveted setter in the country." Among McPeak's top choices were scholarship offers from the UCLA Bruins and the Golden Bears of the University of California, Berkeley.

McPeak chose to attend college at UC Berkeley for its academic excellence. At Cal, McPeak was named Pacific 10 Conference freshman of the year in 1987. At the conclusion of McPeak's freshman year Cal head coach Marlene Piper moved to teach and coach at UC Davis, and was replaced by Dave DeGroot. The coaching change was problematic for the intense McPeak, who found DeGroot unwilling or unable to push the team. For his part DeGroot was not happy with how McPeak was setting the team. Commenting at the time, fellow Bear teammate Lisa Arce, who had played with McPeak at both Mira Costa High and Berkeley, said "Holly is definitely a competitor. She's not one to lose. She always plays to win, whether its a drill, a scrimmage or a game." McPeak continued playing at Cal under DeGroot, leading the Golden Bears to two more playoff berths, making it three tournament appearances in three years. However McPeak's conflict with the Cal head coach escalated to the point of an impasse. After her junior season in 1989 DeGroot banned McPeak from the team. She could continue her studies at Berkeley under scholarship, but she was not allowed to practice or play for the volleyball team.

Believing her college career was over, McPeak resigned herself to focusing on her academics. However, a teammate encouraged her to consider transferring. The one other school she wanted to play for was UCLA. However, Pacific-10 conference policy required a transferring athlete to sit out two years before they can compete at another conference school. McPeak spoke with UCLA head coach Andy Banachowski, who noted she was in a special circumstance as her scholarship school had banned her from further participation. McPeak submitted a challenge to the transfer policy. To win the appeal, McPeak's case had to be approved by faculty athletic representatives from each of the league's 10 institutions. With Banachowski's help, McPeak succeeded in gaining the support of the athletic representatives from all 10 conference schools, including those from the University of California at Berkeley.

Joining UCLA for her senior season, McPeak was joining one of the top programs in the nation. However, the Bruins were hungry to win a national championship, having fallen in the semi-finals the previous two seasons. They were returning several key players, including the team's setter, Jennifer Gratteau. UCLA began the 1990 season running a 6–2, with Gratteau and McPeak splitting time at the setter position. They won their first three matches, then suffered a loss to perennial power Nebraska. By the end of the month they were in a 5–1, and the Bruins were off to the races. Against Stanford McPeak broke a UCLA record with 97 assists. Said Banachowski "We were very good last year with Jennifer, but we finally made the decision to go with Holly because she added a lot more quickness. Everybody seemed to play at a quicker pace when Holly was in there." DeGroot had the opportunity to observe this for himself during Cal's two losses to the Bruins during the 1990 regular season.

The 1990 UCLA Bruins went on to win the NCAA collegiate championship. It was the school's fifth of seven national titles. McPeak was selected first team All-Pac-10 and first team All-Tournament. She had amassed the single season assist record of 2,192 assists, to go along with her single match assist mark of 97 assists. The team's season record of 36 - 1 was the best mark in women's volleyball in school history. Said coach Banachowski "We wanted McPeak out of high school because she was a tremendous athlete. I only wish I had had her for the three years instead of the one. Besides being a great athlete, she's quick and very competitive."

The following year McPeak served as an assistant coach for Banachowski, whose Bruins repeated as national champions. Soon thereafter McPeak became intensely involved in professional beach volleyball. She continued her studies at UCLA, graduating in 1995 with a degree in English.

== Career in beach volleyball ==
McPeak grew up at Marine street, and followed local beach doubles teams such as Jim Menges and Matt Gage, Mike Dodd and Tim Hovland, and later players like Karch Kiraly and Sinjin Smith. After graduating high school in 1987, McPeak made her pro beach volleyball debut at the age of 18, partnering with Jill Horning at the WPVA "Miller Lite Open" in Santa Monica. Horning had been a year ahead of McPeak at Mira Costa High. The team scored a ninth-place finish, an accomplishment the young rookies repeated later that summer in the pair's second professional tournament. Following McPeak's freshman year at Cal she and Horning partnered again for two more pro beach volleyball tournaments, again finishing ninth each time.

McPeak was named the WPVA's Rookie of the Year in 1991, but it was not until 1993 at the Phoenix Open that she would win her first tournament. She would win 11 tournaments that year, eight of them with Cammy Ciarelli.

At the 1996 Summer Olympics, McPeak teamed up with Nancy Reno, but they finished in fifth place with a 2 – 2 record. This was right behind the American team of Barbra Fontana and Linda Hanley, which lost the bronze-medal game and finished fourth. Fontana and Hanley had defeated McPeak and Reno in face-to-face competition in this double-elimination tournament, thus eliminating McPeak and Reno and sending them to fifth place.

McPeak returned for the 2000 Olympic Games in Sydney, teaming with Misty May in May's first Olympic competition. The pair won through the first two rounds, but then lost 16–14 in a hard-fought quarter-final match against Sandra Pires and Adriana Samuel of Brazil. The team finished tied for fifth place.

In 2002 the AVP shortened the court dimensions from 30 feet by 60 feet to 8 meters by 16 meters (26 feet 3 inches by 52 feet 6 inches). The rule change decreased the area a player had to defend, making player height a more essential element of a player's success. Shorter players like McPeak were placed at a disadvantage. The change followed the FIVB change from the year before. Said McPeak, "I liked the big courts better - with ball control we could make the big girls run."

At the 2004 Summer Olympics McPeak teamed with Elaine Youngs. The pair reached the semifinals where they met McPeak's former partner Misty May, and her new partner Kerri Walsh. May and Walsh won the match, sending McPeak and Youngs to the bronze medal match, where they faced Australians Natalie Cook and Nicole Sanderson. McPeak and Youngs won to earn their first Olympic medal.

During the 2005 season, McPeak teamed up with Jennifer Kessy and with Nicole Branagh for the 2006 season. After Branagh left to partner with Elaine Youngs, McPeak partnered with indoor volleyball player Logan Tom for the 2007 AVP season. She then partnered with Angie Akers.

McPeak initially retired after the 2008 AVP season, but decided to come out of retirement when asked by Kerri Walsh to team with her after Misty May-Treanor suffered a tendon injury. McPeak played her final match with partner Kerri Walsh, retiring for good on May 6, 2009, one week shy of her 40th birthday.

McPeak's career in professional beach volleyball spanned over twenty years. She ranked in the top 10 six times on the AVP Tour and seven times on the FIVB Tour. She was seven times voted the best defensive player in beach volleyball (WPVA 1995, 1996, 1997; BVA 2000, AVP 2002, 2003, 2004), and won titles with seven different partners. She was the first woman to break one million dollars in earnings. McPeak is one of just five women worldwide to have competed in the first three Olympics in beach volleyball.

== Player profile ==
McPeak was a determined and highly competitive athlete. A quick 5-foot-7 setter indoors, on the beach she was renowned for her tough defense and relentless pursuit of the ball. Offensively she could consistently side out, scoring with placement more frequently than with power. She preferred the larger courts of the earlier years, where player height was at less of a premium. She was noted for hard work and for her intense off-court training regimen. She had a long career, scoring at least one career victory in every year she played from 1993 to 2004, with the exception of 1998 when there was no women's domestic tour. Reflecting on her career, she recalls coming to a point where she realized she was capable of winning with any partner and with that realization came an increase in her confidence. McPeak states her toughest opponents were Kerri Walsh and Misty May. At her induction in 2013 she said: "They just drove me crazy and to this day they still do."

== Broadcast career ==
Since retiring from beach volleyball, McPeak works as a color commentator for Pac-12 volleyball shown on Fox Sports West, including most televised games of UCLA. She also does color for SEC coverage on the SEC Network.

In 2014, McPeak served as a sand volleyball game analyst for Pac-12 Network.

== Personal life ==
McPeak is married to former AVP commissioner Leonard Armato and they have 3 sons. She has a twin brother (Gary) and a sister (Katie).

== Awards and honors ==
At UCLA in 1990 she was selected first-team All-Pacific-10, first-team All-Pacific Region and first-team All-NCAA Tournament.

On October 30, 2009, McPeak was inducted into the Volleyball Hall of Fame.
