= David Thomas (beach volleyball) =

Trinidad and Tobago beach volleyball player

Personal information
- Nickname: Thom
- Nationality: Trinidad and Tobago
- Born: June 18, 1974 (age 52); Sangre Grande, Trinidad and Tobago
- Hometown: Sangre Grande, Trinidad and Tobago
- Height: 193 cm (6 ft 4 in)
- Weight: 77 kg (170 lb)

Beach volleyball information
Years	Teammate	Tours (points)
2006	Kevin Edwards	9

Best results
Years	Location	Result
2006	Montreal	41st

David Thomas (born June 18, 1974 in Sangre Grande) is a male beach volleyball player from Trinidad and Tobago. David made history along with Kevin Edwards, becoming the first caribbean team playing in the Swatch FIVB World Tour, the Montreal Open.

Playing with the same partner, he earned the 10th place at the Central American and Caribbean Games beach volleyball tournament.

He played in the men's competition at the NORCECA Beach Volleyball Circuit 2009 in Guatemala partnering with Kevin Rivers when Christian Francois withdrew from the competition. They finished in the 12th place.
