= 2009 NORCECA Beach Volleyball Circuit (Guatemala) =

Tournament details
- Host country: Guatemala
- Dates: April 3–5, 2009
- Teams: 24
- Venue: Campo Marte (in Guatemala City host cities)

The 2009 NORCECA Beach Volleyball Circuit at Guatemala was held April 3–5, 2009 in Guatemala City, Guatemala. It was the second leg of the NORCECA Beach Volleyball Circuit 2009.

== Women's competition ==
RANK	FINAL RANKING	EARNINGS	POINTS
1st place, gold medalist(s)	Sinal - Ballar (CUB)	US$1,700.00	200
2nd place, silver medalist(s)	Van Fleet - Smith (USA)	US$1,000.00	180
3rd place, bronze medalist(s)	Morales - Alfaro (CRC)	US$750.00	160
4.	Virgen - Estrada (MEX)	US$500.00	140
5.	Orellana - Ramírez (GUA)	US$400.00	110
6.	Recinos - Alvarado (GUA)	US$300.00	100
7.	Molina - Soler (ESA)	US$200.00	80
8.	Joseph - Phillip (TTO)	US$150.00	70
9.	Del Rosario - Del Rosario (DOM)		55
10.	Beauchamp - García (PUR)		45
11.	Long - Rodrigue (CAN)		35
12.	Rostrán - Traña (NCA)		25

== Men's competition ==
RANK	FINAL RANKING	EARNINGS	POINTS
1st place, gold medalist(s)	Stolfus - Medel (USA)	US$1,700.00	200
2nd place, silver medalist(s)	González - Peña (CUB)	US$1,000.00	180
3rd place, bronze medalist(s)	Irrizarry - Rodríguez (PUR)	US$750.00	160
4.	Otero - Gil (PUR)	US$500.00	140
5.	Calderón - Castro (NCA)	US$400.00	110
6.	Pérez - Recio (DOM)	US$300.00	100
7.	Bolaños - Garrido (GUA)	US$200.00	80
8.	Morales - Vargas (ESA)	US$150.00	70
9.	Araya - Piskulich (CRC)		55
10.	Ozuna - Pineda (GUA)		45
11.	Medrano - Vargas (ESA)		35
12.	Thomas - Rivers (TTO)		25
