= Swatch FIVB World Tour 2009 =

Tournament details
- Host country: Various
- Dates: April - November, 2009

The Swatch FIVB World Tour 2009 is an international beach volleyball competition.

The tour consists of 12 tournaments with both genders and 7 separate gender tournaments.

The 2009 SWATCH FIVB Beach Volleyball World Championships is part of the tour.

== Grand Slam ==
There are four Grand Slam tournaments. These events give a higher number of points and more money than the rest of the tournaments.

- Gstaad, Switzerland– 1 to 1 Energy Grand Slam, July 7–12, 2009
- Moscow, Russia– Grand Slam Moscow, July 14–19, 2009
- Marseille, France– World Series 13 Grand Chelem, July 21–26, 2009
- Klagenfurt, Austria– A1 09 presented by Volksbank, July 28 - August 2, 2009

== Tournament results ==
=== Women ===
Event	Gold	Silver	Bronze
Banco do Brasil	(Brazil) Larissa-Juliana	(United States) Ross-Kessy	(Germany) Goller-Ludwig
China Shanghai Open	(Brazil) Talita-Antonelli	(China) Wang-Zuo	(Brazil) Maria Clara-Carol
Keihan/Smfg Japan Open	(Brazil) Larissa-Juliana	(Brazil) Talita-Antonelli	(Netherlands) van Iersel-Keizer
Seoul Open	(Brazil) Talita-Antonelli	(United States) Ross-Kessy	(Brazil) Renata-Leão
SWATCH FIVB; World Championships presented by ConocoPhillips	(United States) Ross-Kessy	(Brazil) Larissa-Juliana	(Brazil) Talita-Antonelli
1 to 1 energy Grand Slam	(Brazil) Talita-Antonelli	(Brazil) Larissa-Juliana	(United States) Branagh-Youngs
Grand Slam Moscow	(Brazil) Larissa-Juliana	(Brazil) Renata-Leão	(Germany) Goller-Ludwig
World Series 13 Grand Chelem	(United States) Ross-Kessy	(Greece) Arvaniti-Tsiartsiani	(Germany) Goller-Ludwig
A1 Grand Slam 09 presented by Volksbank	(Brazil) Larissa-Juliana	(United States) Branagh-Youngs	(United States) Ross-Kessy
Mazury Open	(Brazil) Larissa-Juliana	(Australia) Palmer-Bawden	(Brazil) Talita-Antonelli
Otera Open	(Brazil) Talita-Antonelli	(Austria) Schwaiger-Schwaiger	(Brazil) Larissa-Juliana
PAF Open	(Brazil) Larissa-Juliana	(United States) Ross-Kessy	(Brazil) Talita-Antonelli
The Hague Open	(Brazil) Larissa-Juliana	(Brazil) Talita-Antonelli	(Brazil) Vivian-Vieira
Barcelona Open	(Brazil) Larissa-Juliana	(Brazil) Talita-Antonelli	(United States) Ross-Kessy
Sanya Open	(Switzerland) Kuhn-Zumkehr	(United States) Ross-Kessy	(United States) Akers-Turner
Phuket Thailand Open	(United States) Ross-Kessy	(United States) Akers-Turner	(Russia) Bratkova-Ukolova

=== Men ===
Event	Gold	Silver	Bronze
Banco do Brasil	(Brazil) Ricardo-Emanuel	(Brazil) Harley-Alison	(Brazil) Márcio Araújo-Fábio Luiz
China Shanghai Open	(Brazil) Harley-Alison	(Brazil) Cunha-Pedro	(Germany) Brink-Reckermann
Foro Italico Open	(Germany) Brink-Reckermann	(Brazil) Cunha-Pedro	(Brazil) Harley-Alison
Myslowice Open	(Brazil) Harley-Alison	(United States) Jennings-Fuerbringer	(United States) Gibb-Rosenthal
SWATCH FIVB; World Championships presented by ConocoPhillips	(Germany) Brink-Reckermann	(Brazil) Harley-Alison	(United States) Rogers-Dalhausser
1 to 1 energy Grand Slam	(Germany) Brink-Reckermann	(Brazil) Ricardo-Emanuel	(Spain) Herrera-Gavira
Grand Slam Moscow	(Germany) Brink-Reckermann	(Brazil) Ricardo-Emanuel	(Switzerland) Laciga M.-Bellaguarda
World Series 13 Grand Chelem	(United States) Rogers-Dalhausser	(Spain) Herrera-Gavira	(Germany) Brink-Reckermann
A1 Grand Slam 09 presented by Volksbank	(United States) Rogers-Dalhausser	(Brazil) Harley-Alison	(Netherlands) Nummerdor-Schuil
Mazury Open	(Brazil) Benjamin-Pedro	(Germany) Brink-Reckermann	(Spain) Herrera-Gavira
Otera Open	(Russia) Barsouk-Kolodinsky	(Latvia) Samoilovs-Sorokins	(Brazil) Harley-Alison
PAF Open	(Netherlands) Nummerdor-Schuil	(Germany) Brink-Reckermann	(Germany) Klemperer-Koreng
The Hague Open	(Netherlands) Nummerdor-Schuil	(Spain) Herrera-Gavira	(Brazil) Harley-Alison
Sanya Open	(Netherlands) Nummerdor-Schuil	(China) Wu-Xu	(Spain) Herrera-Gavira

== Medal table by country ==
Rank	Nation	Gold	Silver	Bronze	Total
1	Brazil (BRA)	16	13	11	40
2	United States (USA)	5	7	6	18
3	Germany (GER)	3	2	6	11
4	Netherlands (NED)	3	0	2	5
5	Russia (RUS)	1	0	1	2
5	Switzerland (SUI)	1	0	1	2
7	Spain (ESP)	0	2	3	5
8	China (CHN)	0	2	0	2
9	Australia (AUS)	0	1	0	1
9	Austria (AUT)	0	1	0	1
9	Greece (GRE)	0	1	0	1
9	Latvia (LAT)	0	1	0	1
Totals (12 entries)		29	30	30	89
