= Swatch FIVB World Tour 2010 =

Tournament details
- Host country: Various
- Dates: April - November, 2010

The Swatch FIVB World Tour 2010 is an international beach volleyball competition.

The tour consists of 12 tournaments with both genders and 5 separate gender tournaments.

== Grand Slam ==
There are four Grand Slam tournaments. These events give a higher number of points and more money than the rest of the tournaments.

- Rome, Italy- Foro Italico Beach Volley Grand Slam, 17–23 May 2010
- Moscow, Russia– Grand Slam Moscow, June 7–14, 2010
- Stavanger, Norway- ConocoPhillips Grand Slam, June 28 - July 4, 2010
- Gstaad, Switzerland– 1 to 1 Energy Grand Slam, 5–11 July 2010
- Klagenfurt, Austria– A1 presented by Volksbank, July 26 - August 1, 2010
- Stare Jabłonki, Poland- Mazury Orlen Grand Slam, 2–8 August 2010

== Tournament results ==
=== Women ===
Event	Gold	Silver	Bronze
Brasília Open	(Brazil) Larissa-Juliana	(Germany) Goller-Ludwig	(Brazil) Maria Clara-Carol
China Shanghai Open	(United States) Kessy-Ross	(Brazil) Larissa-Juliana	(Brazil) Antonelli-Talita
Foro Italico Grand Slam	(United States) Kessy-Ross	(Germany) Goller-Ludwig	(Brazil) Antonelli-Talita
Seoul Open	(Brazil) Larissa-Juliana	(United States) Akers-Turner	(United States) Kessy-Ross
Grand Slam Moscow	(China) Xue-Zhang Xi	(United States) Kessy-Ross	(Brazil) Larissa-Juliana
ConocoPhillips Grand Slam	(Brazil) Larissa-Juliana	(Brazil) Antonelli-Talita	(United States) May-Treanor-Branagh
1 to 1 Energy Grand Slam	(Brazil) Larissa-Juliana	(Germany) Goller-Ludwig	(China) Xue-Zhang Xi
World Series 13	(Brazil) Antonelli-Talita	(Austria) Schwaiger-Schwaiger	(Austria) Hansel-Montagnolli
A1 Grand Slam	(Brazil) Larissa-Juliana	(Brazil) Vivian-Lima	(Germany) Goller-Ludwig
Mazury Orlen Grand Slam	(Brazil) Larissa-Juliana	(China) Xue-Zhang Xi	(Brazil) Antonelli-Talita
Otera Open	(Brazil) Larissa-Juliana	(China) Xue-Zhang Xi	(Brazil) Maria Clara-Carol
PAF Open	(China) Xue-Zhang Xi	(Brazil) Larissa-Juliana	(Brazil) Antonelli-Talita
Milner Open	(Brazil) Antonelli-Talita	(China) Xue-Zhang Xi	(United States) Akers-Turner
Sanya Open	(China) Xue-Zhang Xi	(Germany) Goller-Ludwig	(United States) Kessy-Ross
Phuket Thailand Open	(United States) Walsh-Branagh	(Italy) Rosso-Menegatti	(Brazil) Maria Clara-Carol

=== Men ===
Event	Gold	Silver	Bronze
Brasília Open	(United States) Rogers-Dalhausser	(Brazil) Alison-Emanuel	(Brazil) Benjamin-Bruno
China Shanghai Open	(Brazil) Pedro-Harley	(Germany) Brink-Reckermann	(Brazil) Alison-Emanuel
Foro Italico Grand Slam	(United States) Rogers-Dalhausser	(Brazil) Alison-Emanuel	(Spain) Herrera-Gavira
Myslowice Open	(United States) Rogers-Dalhausser	(Spain) Herrera-Gavira	(Germany) Brink-Reckermann
Grand Slam Moscow	(China) Wu-Xu	(United States) Rogers-Dalhausser	(Germany) Brink-Reckermann
Patria Direct Open	(United States) Rogers-Dalhausser	(Brazil) Alison-Emanuel	(Germany) Brink-Reckermann
ConocoPhillips Grand Slam	(Germany) Klemperer-Koreng	(Norway) Skarlund-Spinnangr	(United States) Rogers-Dalhausser
1 to 1 Energy Grand Slam	(United States) Rogers-Dalhausser	(Germany) Klemperer-Koreng	(Brazil) Márcio Araújo-Ricardo
World Series 13	(China) Wu-Xu	(Latvia) Plavins-Smedins	(Poland) Fijałek-Prudel
A1 Grand Slam	(United States) Rogers-Dalhausser	(United States) Fuerbringer-Lucena	(Brazil) Alison-Emanuel
Mazury Orlen Grand Slam	(United States) Rogers-Dalhausser	(Germany) Brink-Reckermann	(Brazil) Márcio Araújo-Ricardo
Otera Open	(United States) Rogers-Dalhausser	(Brazil) Harley-Pedro	(Brazil) Alison-Emanuel
PAF Open	(United States) Rogers-Dalhausser	(Brazil) Márcio Araújo-Ricardo	(China) Wu-Xu
Milner Open	(United States) Jennings-Wong	(Brazil) Benjamin-Bruno	(United States) Fuerbringer-Lucena

== Medal table by country ==
Rank	Nation	Gold	Silver	Bronze	Total
1	United States (USA)	13	4	6	23
2	Brazil (BRA)	10	10	14	34
3	China (CHN)	5	3	2	10
4	Germany (GER)	1	7	4	12
5	Austria (AUT)	0	1	1	2
5	Spain (ESP)	0	1	1	2
7	Italy (ITA)	0	1	0	1
7	Latvia (LAT)	0	1	0	1
7	Norway (NOR)	0	1	0	1
10	Poland (POL)	0	0	1	1
Totals (10 entries)		29	29	29	87
