= Lisa Arce =

American beach volleyball player (born 1969)

Personal information
- Full name: Lisa Arce Zimmerman
- Born: July 8, 1969 (age 57); Manhattan Beach, California, U.S.
- Height: 5 ft 11 in (1.80 m)
Medal record
Women's beach volleyball
Representing the United States
World Championships
Silver medal – second place	1997 Los Angeles	Beach

Lisa Arce Zimmerman (born July 8, 1969, in Manhattan Beach, California) is a retired female beach volleyball player from the United States who won the silver medal at the 1997 World Championships in Los Angeles, California, partnering with her former high school and college teammate Holly McPeak.

== About ==
Standing at 5 feet 11 inches, Arce was a world champion volleyball player. She currently resides in Redondo Beach, California. Over the span of her career, she has won over $650,000. Until 2013, she was the girls' volleyball coach at Mira Costa High School.

== Education ==
Arce obtained her degree in English from the University of California Berkeley where she also played volleyball and was a four-year starter and two-time All-Pacific 10 player. Arce ranks among the school's all-time leaders in digs, kills, attempts, and service aces.

== Family ==
Arce has a brother name Rick who was also a former professional beach volleyball player. In March 2001, Arce married her husband, Andrew Zimmerman, and together they had two kids, Ella and Abby.

== Awards ==
- 1997-WPVA Best Blocker
- 1997-WPVA Best Hitter
- 1997-WPVA Most Aces
- 1995-WPVA Most Improved Player
- 1994-WPVA Rookie of the Year
