= Carrie Dodd =

American beach volleyball player (born 1974)

Personal information
- Nationality: United States
- Born: May 19, 1974 (age 52)
- Hometown: Milwaukee, Wisconsin, U.S.
- Height: 6 ft 0 in (1.83 m)
- Education: Texas

Volleyball information
- Position: Setter

National team
1997	United States

Carrie Dodd (née Busch; born May 19, 1974) is an American former professional volleyball player from the United States who played as a setter in the AVP Beach Vollyball tour in 1999 and from 2001-2009; the FIVB Tour from 1999-2006; the WPVA Tour in 1997, and the BVA Tour in 2000. Before that Dodd played indoor volleyball at the University of Texas.

Dodd competed at the 1999 Pan American Games on a team that came in 5th. She was the BVA's Best Setter and Most Improved Player in 2000 and the AVP's Best Setter in 2002. She had AVP Tour wins in both 2008 and 2009.

== College career ==
She played volleyball at the University of Texas from 1992 to 1995 where she was an All-American. Prior to that she had been a High School Volleyball All-American and a Volleyball Magazine Fab50 selection.

In 1993 she competed for the South in the U.S. Olympic Festival's Volleyball tournament.

She was MVP and captain of the 1995 team that was runner-up for the NCAA championship. Against Texas Tech she had 30 digs, the 2nd most in a single game in school history at the time and still the most in a four set match. In an earlier game against Texas Tech that year she also set the record for digs in a three-set match. In 1994 and 1995 she led the team in assists and in 1995 she had the second most assists in a season in school history. She also set the record for the most assists per set in school history. At the end of the year she was honored as a member of the All-NCAA tournament team, a 2nd team AVCA All-American, the AVCA All-Region Team and Volleyball Magazine 3rd Team All-American and 1st Team all Southwest Conference.

She ended her career with the 2nd most services ace per set and 4th most assists in school history.

== Later Life ==
After retiring from Volleyball as a player, she coached high school volleyball and worked in the restaurant business in the Los Angeles area.

Her sister Nikki Busch was a two-time All-American middle blocker at Texas. In 2005 she married Matt Dodd, brother of Beach Volleyball Olympic Medalist Mike Dodd.
