= Ty Loomis =

American beach volleyball player (born 1979)

Personal information
- Born: May 1, 1979 (age 47) La Crosse, Wisconsin, U.S.
- Height: 6 ft 3 in (1.91 m)
Beach volleyball information
- Years: Teammate
- –: Hans Stolfus
Medal record
Men's beach volleyball
Representing the United States
Pan American Games
Silver medal – second place	2007 Santo Domingo	Beach

Ty Loomis (born May 1, 1979) is a male beach volleyball player from the United States. He won the silver medal in the men's beach team competition at the 2007 Pan American Games in Rio de Janeiro, Brazil, partnering with Hans Stolfus. The pair became the first United States men's team to medal in the Pan Am Games when they placed second in 2007.
