= Marsha Miller =

American beach volleyball player (born 1969)

Personal information
- Born: January 15, 1969 (age 57); Rochester, New York, U.S.
- Height: 6 ft 1 in (185 cm)

Beach volleyball information
Teammate
Jenny Pavley
Medal record
Women's beach volleyball
Representing the United States
Pan American Games
| Silver medal – second place | 1999 Winnipeg | Beach |

Marsha Miller (born January 15, 1969, in Rochester, New York) is a retired beach volleyball player from the United States. Miller won the silver medal in the women's beach team competition at the 1999 Pan American Games in Winnipeg, Manitoba, Canada, partnering with Jenny Pavley.
