= Anthony Medel =

American beach volleyball player

Personal information
- Nationality: American
- Born: March 28, 1978 (age 48); Santa Barbara, California, U.S.
- Hometown: Santa Barbara, California, U.S.
- Height: 191 cm (6 ft 3 in)

Beach volleyball information

Current teammate
| Years | Teammate |
|---|---|
| 2009 | Hans Stolfus |
Medal record
Men's beach volleyball
Representing the United States
NORCECA Beach Volleyball Circuit
| Gold medal – first place | 2009 Guatemala | Beach |

Anthony Medel (born March 28, 1978) is a male beach volleyball player from the United States who won the gold medal at the NORCECA Circuit 2009 at Guatemala playing with Hans Stolfus.

Medel has also participated in the Association of Volleyball Professionals tournaments since 1999.

== Personal life ==
Medel has continued with the sport of volleyball by coaching club, junior high, and high school teams while pursuing his master's degree in education.

== Awards ==
=== National team ===
- NORCECA Beach Volleyball Circuit Guatemala 2009 Gold Medal

=== AVP Pro Tour ===
- Miami 2009 Bronze Medal
- Miami 2008 Bronze Medal
- Atlanta 2008 Silver Medal
- Belmar 2008 Bronze Medal
- Boulder 2008 Silver Medal
- Seaside Heights 2007 Bronze Medal
- Manhattan Beach 2007 Bronze Medal
- Boston 2007 Bronze Medal
