= Rachel Wacholder Scott =

American model and beach volleyball player

Personal information
- Nationality: American
- Born: Rachel Wacholder; June 15, 1975 (age 51); Laguna Beach, California, U.S.
- Height: 5 ft 9 in (175 cm)
- Education: University of Colorado

Beach volleyball information
Teammate	Tours (points)
Kerri Walsh, Elaine Youngs, Jennifer Kessy, Tyra Turner	Beach Volleyball America (BVA) Tour, Association of Volleyball Professionals (AVP) Tour
Medal record
Women's beach volleyball
Representing the United States
World Tour
Gold medal – first place	2004 Marseille	Beach
Gold medal – first place	2004 Klagenfurt	Beach
Silver medal – second place	2005 Klagenfurt	Beach
Silver medal – second place	2008 Mazury	Beach
Silver medal – second place	2008 Paris	Beach
Bronze medal – third place	2004 Stavanger	Beach
Bronze medal – third place	2005 Brazil	Beach
Bronze medal – third place	2005 Acapulco	Beach
Bronze medal – third place	2007 Paris	Beach

Rachel Wacholder Scott (born 15 June 1975) is an American former professional beach volleyball player who won eight beach volleyball championships with three partners. Scott was named Best Defensive Player 2005 and Most Improved Player on the AVP Tour in 2005. By 2009, she had played in 168 beach volleyball events, 121 domestically and 47 internationally, and earned eight victories, 22 runner-up performances, and won over $750,000 in prize money.

== Early life ==
Scott was born Rachel Wacholder in Laguna Beach, California and attended Laguna Beach High School ('93). Playing for the high school's indoor volleyball team, she was named the Orange County volleyball player of the year during her Junior year. The following year, Wacholder was named California High School Volleyball Player of the Year for 1993.

She then attended the University of Colorado and graduated with a degree in Communications in 1996. She started four seasons on the volleyball team where she earned second team All-Big Eight honors in both 1994 and '95 and first-team All-Big 12 honors in 1996, the first season of the new league. She was a member of the 1993 Big Eight Championship team for the Buffaloes. She has held 32 records in the Colorado Volleyball record book, including most kills in a three-game match (24) and is the only Buffalo to record 100 attacks in a single match, swinging 106 times against Iowa State in 1996. She ranks in the top five in CU history in career kills (3rd – 1,484), career attacks (2nd – 4,330), career service aces (t-4th – 145) and career digs (4th – 1,342).

== Career ==
Scott won the most improved player in 2000 on the Beach Volleyball America (BVA) Tour.

Scott won two Fédération Internationale de Volleyball (FIVB) Grand Slam events in 2004, her first two career victories, alongside Olympic gold medal winner Kerri Walsh, filling in for an injured Misty May-Treanor.

In 2005, she had the second-most kills and second-most digs on the Association of Volleyball Professionals (AVP) Tour. At the end of the 2005 season, she was voted the AVP's best defensive player and most improved player of the year.

In 2006, she was the No. 2 seed on the AVP tour along with her partner, beach volleyball veteran Elaine Youngs. During the 2005 AVP tour, Scott and Youngs dealt top-seeded Kerri Walsh and Misty May-Treanor a surprise defeat at the Huntington Beach Open, halting the two-time Olympic Gold Medal winning team's 50-match win streak. She ranked second on the tour in kills (7.71 per game), and seventh in digs (5.17 per game). The duo would go on to win five events together, all on the AVP Tour with three coming in 2005 and two in 2006.

In August 2006, Scott and Youngs split before the 2006 Manhattan Beach Open. Scott paired with Jen (Kessy) Boss defeated Youngs and new partner Nicole Branagh in their first meeting at the Coney Island Open. In 2007, she was ninth on the tour in digs (5.49 per game). In 2008, she won the San Diego AVP Open with partner Tyra Turner.

By 2009, Scott had played in 168 beach volleyball events, 121 domestically and 47 internationally. She had earned eight victories, 22 runner-up performances, and won over $750,000 in prize money.

Following the birth of her son, Scott returned to competition at the 2009 Hermosa Beach Open, partnering again with Walsh who was also a new mother. The duo played in the final four events of the season, finishing third once. In 2010, she reunited with Youngs and the duo finished fifth to open the season at the Fort Lauderdale, Florida AVP event.

== Personal life ==
In November 2007, Wacholder married professional beach volleyball player Sean Scott. They have two children and reside in Redondo Beach, California.

Wacholder Scott is Jewish.

== Honors ==
- In 2006, she was inducted into the Southern California Jewish Sports Hall of Fame.
- In 2024, Scott was inducted into the University of Colorado Boulder Athletic Hall of Fame.
