= Mark Williams (volleyball) =

American volleyball player

Personal information
- Nationality: United States
- Born: 27 March 1979 (age 47); Sydney, Australia
- Height: 1.99 m (6 ft 6 1/2 in)
- Weight: 89 kg (196 lb)
Medal record
Men's beach volleyball
Representing the United States
World Tour
Silver medal – second place	2008 Klagenfurt	Beach

Mark Williams (born 27 March 1979) is an American volleyball and beach volleyball player.

Williams was born in Sydney but moved to the United States when he was nine years old. In 1999, while he was at UCLA, Williams trained with the Australian national indoor team. At the 2000 Summer Olympics in Sydney, was a libero of the squad which placed eighth among 12 participating teams.

In 1998 he made his debut in beach volleyball with Larry Witt where they competed in Hermosa Beach. After graduating in 2001, he played in five AVP events that year with several partners.

At the 2004 Summer Olympics in Athens, Williams qualified for the beach volleyball tournament alongside Julien Prosser after competing in the FIVB Tour during the 2003 season. They finished in fourth place after losing the bronze medal match to fifth-seeded team Patrick Heuscher and Stefan Kobel from Switzerland.
