= Mike Dodd =

American beach volleyball player

Personal information
- Full name: Michael Dodd
- Born: August 20, 1957 (age 69); Manhattan Beach, California, U.S.
- Height: 6 ft 4 in (193 cm)
- Education: San Diego State University
Medal record
Men's beach volleyball
Representing United States
Olympic Games
Silver medal – second place	1996 Atlanta	Beach

Michael Dodd (born August 20, 1957) is an American retired professional beach volleyball player who attended San Diego State University. With his partner Mike Whitmarsh, he won the silver medal in the men's inaugural beach volleyball tournament at the 1996 Summer Olympics in Atlanta. Since winning silver in the 1996 Atlanta Olympics, he has worked the Olympic Games of 2000 as a beach analyst and 2004 as an indoor analyst for NBC. In 2008, Dodd coached AVP stars Jake Gibb and Sean Rosenthal in the Beijing Olympics. Dodd also captained Team USA to a win over Brazil's best players in the inaugural AVP World Challenge in 2009.

Born and raised in Manhattan Beach, California and a Mira Costa High School alumnus, Dodd won five Manhattan Open titles. In 2009, he became the first person to coach the men's and women's champions of the same Manhattan Open (Jake Gibb and Sean Rosenthal, and Nicole Branagh and Elaine Youngs). Dodd was named AVP Sportsman of the Year in 1994 and 1996 and AVP Most Inspirational Player three times in a row from 1995 to 1997. Since earning his AAA volleyball rating at age 16, Dodd has represented the United States men's national volleyball team and played professionally in Italy, in addition to his AVP career as a player and coach. He is in the California Beach Volleyball Association Hall of Fame. In 2012, Dodd was inducted into the International Volleyball Hall of Fame.

Dodd won 75 titles in his 18-year career and a silver medal in the first Olympics to feature beach volleyball. He also played basketball while at San Diego State for four years; in fact, he was drafted by the hometown San Diego Clippers in 1979 (9th round, 176th overall pick), but ultimately decided that playing competitive volleyball was his calling because basketball is too physical for him.

== Awards and honors ==
- AVP Best Defensive Player 1994, 1995, 1996, 1997
- AVP Best Spiker 1989
- AVP Most Inspirational 1995, 1996, 1997
- AVP Sportsman of the Year 1994, 1996
