= Dianne DeNecochea =

American beach volleyball player (born 1967)

Personal information
- Born: November 16, 1967 (age 58); Detroit, Michigan, U.S.
- Hometown: Brooklyn, Michigan, U.S.
- Height: 6 ft 4 in (1.93 m)
- Education: University of Tennessee
Medal record
Women's beach volleyball
Representing the United States
World Tour
Bronze medal – third place	2003 Milan	Beach

Dianne DeNecochea (née Shoemaker; born November 16, 1967) is a retired professional beach volleyball player from the United States who played on the AVP Tour. DeNocochea played volleyball at the University of Tennessee and was inducted into the Lady Volunteer Hall of Fame in 2007. DeNocochea began playing on the AVP Tour full-time in 2001. She also played professional indoor volleyball in Switzerland, Belgium, and Italy.
