= Jenny Johnson Jordan =

American beach volleyball player

Personal information
- Full name: Jennifer A. Johnson
- Born: June 8, 1973 (age 53); Tarzana, Los Angeles, California

Coaching information
- Current team: UCLA
Previous teams coached
Years
2013–present
Medal record
Women's beach volleyball
Representing the United States
World Championships
Silver medal – second place	1999 Marseille	Beach
World Tour
Silver medal – second place	2004 Shanghai	Beach
Silver medal – second place	2004 Stavanger	Beach
Silver medal – second place	2004 Marseille	Beach
Bronze medal – third place	2004 Klagenfurt	Beach

Jennifer A. Johnson Jordan (born June 8, 1973) is an American female beach volleyball player. She won the silver medal at the 1999 Beach Volleyball World Championships in Marseille, alongside Annett Davis.

She attended the University of California, Los Angeles (UCLA), and was a member of their Bruins volleyball team. She competed in the 2000 Summer Olympics with Davis, finishing in fifth place.

== Collegiate career ==
As a Bruin, Johnson Jordan played in 127 matches in her four years. She recorded 112 kills and 1,214 digs, and is one of only 12 Bruins to post at least 1,000 career digs and kills.

=== Awards ===
- PAC-10, All-Academic Team, 1993 & 1995
- PAC-10, First Team, 1993 & 1995
- Volleyball Magazine's All-American – Honorable Mention (earned twice)

== Professional career ==
On June 5, 2023 Johnson Jordan was named head Women's Beach Volleyball coach at UCLA, after she spent seven years as an assistant. She is only the second beach volleyball coach in school history. Stein Metzger was the first.

As both a player and a coach, she has achieved national titles. Notably, she played a crucial role in leading the Bruins to their inaugural NCAA Beach Volleyball Championship in 2018, where the team finished the season with an impressive 40-4 record.

She has won ten professional beach volleyball titles on the Pro 4's Tours: Federation Internationale de Volleyball (FIVB), Women's Professional Volleyball Association (WPVA), BVA and Association of Volleyball Professionals (AVP).

On May 3, 2026, Johnson Jordan led UCLA to its third NCAA Beach Volleyball National Championship, defeating Stanford 3-0. It was the first championship for Johnson Jordan in her third year as head coach, and the 127th overall by the UCLA Athletics program.

== Professional awards and legacy ==
- On October 5, 2018, she was inducted into the UCLA Hall of Fame.
- Class of 2018 Beach Volleyball Hall of Fame Inductee
- 1999 -FIBV Championships, Silver Medal, Beach Volleyball
- 2004 Olympic Games Beach Volleyball Team (alternate)
- 1997 FIVB - 4 Person World Beach Championship - Gold Medal

== Personal ==
Johnson Jordan currently resides in Tarzana, California, with husband Kevin Jordan, a former UCLA wide receiver, and their two children, Jaylen (born 2001) and Kory (born 2005).

She is the daughter of the Olympic decathlon champion Rafer Johnson and the niece of Pro Football Hall of Fame player Jimmy Johnson.

Johnson Jordan was a girls' varsity volleyball assistant coach at the Windward School in Los Angeles, California. She is now the head coach for beach volleyball at UCLA, where the team has won the 2018 and 2019 national championships.
