= Jennifer Kessy =

American beach volleyball player

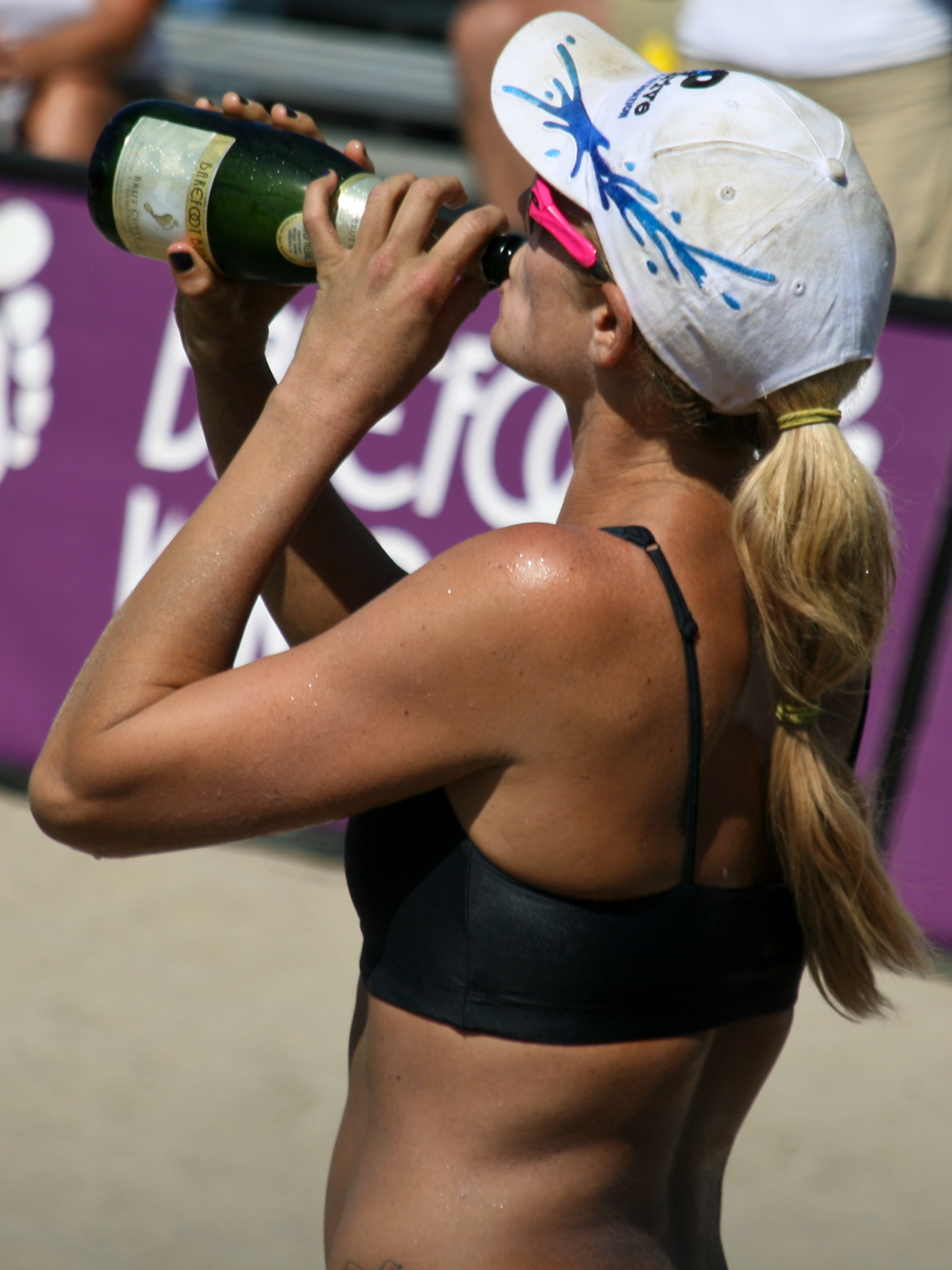
- Kessy in 2009

Personal information
- Full name: Jennifer Anne Kessy
- Nationality: United States
- Born: July 31, 1977 (age 49); San Clemente, California, U.S.
- Hometown: San Juan Capistrano, California, U.S.
- Height: 6 ft 0 in (1.83 m)

Beach volleyball information

Current teammate
Years	Teammate
2015–?	Emily Day

Previous teammates
Years	Teammate
2013– 2007–2013; 2006; 2005; 2004; 2003; 2002; 2001; 2000	April Ross; Nancy Mason, Rachel Wacholder; Holly McPeak, Mason, Wacholder; Barbra Fontana; Jenny Pavley, Barbra Fontana; Heather Lowe, Cary Wendell; Lowe, Angie Maredith, Simpson; Angie Simpson
Medal record
Women's beach volleyball
Representing the United States
Olympic Games
Silver medal – second place	2012 London	Beach
World Championships
Gold medal – first place	2009 Stavanger	Beach
World Tour
Gold medal – first place	2007 Stavanger	Beach
Gold medal – first place	2008 Phuket	Beach
Gold medal – first place	2008 Sanya	Beach
Gold medal – first place	2009 Marseille	Beach
Gold medal – first place	2009 Phuket	Beach
Gold medal – first place	2010 Shanghai	Beach
Gold medal – first place	2010 Rome	Beach
Gold medal – first place	2011 Stavanger	Beach
Gold medal – first place	2012 Bangsaen	Beach
Silver medal – second place	2007 St. Petersburg	Beach
Silver medal – second place	2008 Dubai	Beach
Silver medal – second place	2009 Brasil	Beach
Silver medal – second place	2009 Seoul	Beach
Silver medal – second place	2009 PAF	Beach
Silver medal – second place	2009 Sanya	Beach
Silver medal – second place	2010 Moscow	Beach
Silver medal – second place	2011 Shanghai	Beach
Silver medal – second place	2011 Stare Jabłonki	Beach
Silver medal – second place	2011 Phuket	Beach
Silver medal – second place	2013 Rome	Beach
Bronze medal – third place	2008 Stavanger	Beach
Bronze medal – third place	2009 Klagenfurt	Beach
Bronze medal – third place	2009 Barcelona	Beach
Bronze medal – third place	2010 Seoul	Beach
Bronze medal – third place	2010 Sanya	Beach
Bronze medal – third place	2011 Brasília	Beach
Bronze medal – third place	2011 Myslowice	Beach
Bronze medal – third place	2011 Beijing	Beach
Bronze medal – third place	2012 Rome	Beach
Bronze medal – third place	2016 Antalya	Beach

Jennifer "Jen" Anne Kessy (born July 31, 1977) is a retired American professional beach volleyball player on the AVP Tour. She currently is the coach of April Ross and Alix Klineman.

== Early years ==
Growing up in Southern California, Kessy excelled at multiple sports. In high school, she was the MVP of the swim team her junior year and the captain and the MVP of the volleyball team her senior year, earning honors as an All-California Interscholastic Federation (CIF) second team. In 1994, she graduated from Dana Hills High School in Dana Point, California.

== College ==
Kessy continued her athletic excellence while attending the University of Southern California. She was a member of the volleyball team for all four years (1995–1998) and was named an All-American her senior year. Also, she was a member of the U.S. Junior National Team. Kessy graduated from USC with a bachelor's degree in history. Kessy was also a member of the Kappa Kappa Gamma sorority.

== Professional career ==
After signing a six-month contract for about $25,000, Kessy played indoor volleyball professionally under the coaches Gido Vermeulen (head, The Netherlands) and Christine Masel (assistant, DePaul University and University of Illinois) for the USPV Chicago Thunder which finished runners-up (10–8) in the USPV in 2002. In November 2002 with the collapse of the USPV, she signed with the team Pinkin de Corozal in Humacao, Puerto Rico, for the 2003 season and finished sixth overall for points in the LVSF.

Kessy competed with the Olympian Barbra Fontana in 2004 and the Olympic Bronze Medalist and three-time Olympian Holly McPeak in 2005.

Teaming up with her fellow USC Trojan April Ross in 2007, the tandem then became one of the most successful teams in the world. On July 4, 2009, Kessy and Ross won the FIVB World Championships in Stavanger, Norway, defeating the Brazilians Juliana Felisberta Silva and Larissa Franca.

As of April 2012, Kessy had ten AVP and nine FIVB first-place finishes overall, as well as over $1,223,635 in total prize money.

In the spring of 2012, Kessy signed as a CoverGirl model for the 2012 Summer Olympics in London.

In the 2012 London Olympics Kessy and Ross finished with the silver medal, when they lost to their fellow countrywomen Misty May-Treanor and Kerri Walsh Jennings in the championship game by the scores of 16-21 and 16–21.

Kessy did not play in the 2014 season due to her pregnancy with her first baby. She returned to the AVP tour in 2015 and teamed up with her fellow Californian Emily Day to begin the 2015 season.

== Coaching career ==
- 2018 - Coaching April Ross & Alix Klineman, the #1 US team. April Ross & Alix Klineman won the first FIVB tournament of 2018.
- 2017-2018 - Coaching Winter Beach Elite Team at American Beach Volleyball Club at Doheny State Beach in Dana Point, California

== Personal life ==
Kessy married French beach volleyball player Andy Cés in 2013. The pair have a daughter and son. Her cousin Kale Kessy is a professional ice hockey player.

== Awards and honors ==
- 1994 All-California Interscholastic Federation (CIF) second team (volleyball)
- 1998 All-American in volleyball
- 2004 AVP Most Improved Player
- 2008 AVP "Best of the Beach"*
- 2009 AVP "Best of the Beach"*
- 2009 USA Volleyball Beach Team of the Year (shared with April Ross).

An asterisk denotes that Ms. Kessy was the only player to be named the AVP "Best of the Beach" for two consecutive years.

== Clubs ==
- Chicago Thunder in the United States Professional Volleyball League (2002)
- (Puerto Rico) Pinkin de Corozal in the Liga de Voleibol Superior Femenino (2003)
