= Casey Jennings =

American beach volleyball player and wrestler (born 1975)

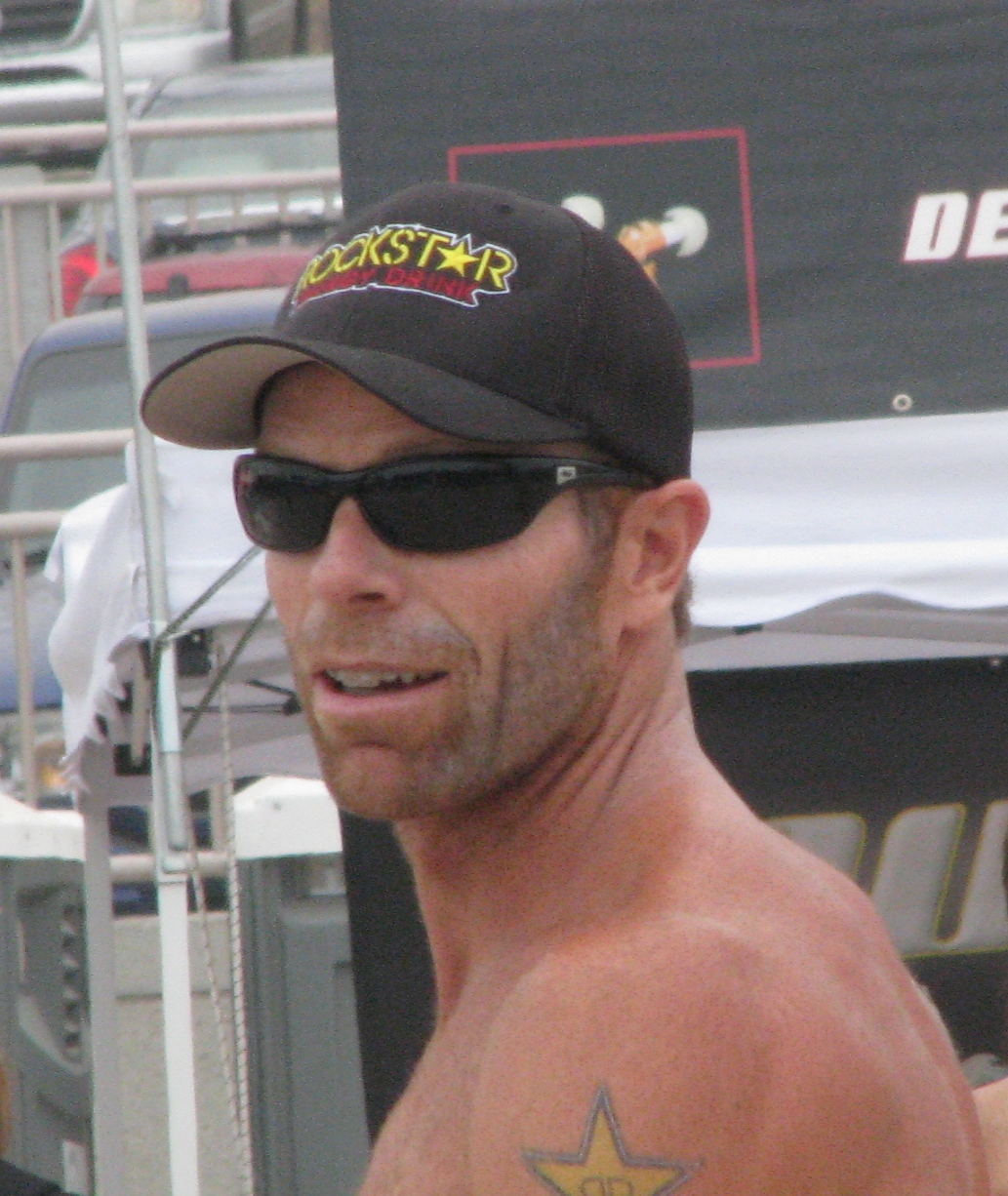

Personal information
- Full name: Casey Thomas Jennings
- Nationality: American
- Born: July 10, 1975 (age 51); Las Vegas, Nevada, U.S.
- Hometown: Redondo Beach, California, U.S.
- Height: 6 ft 3 in (191 cm)
- Weight: 190 lb (86 kg)

Beach volleyball information

Current teammate
Teammate
Kevin Wong
Medal record
Men's beach volleyball
Representing the United States
World Tour
Gold medal – first place	2010 Milner	Beach
Silver medal – second place	2009 Myslowice	Beach
Silver medal – second place	2013 São Paulo	Beach
Bronze medal – third place	2008 VIP	Beach

Casey Thomas Jennings (born July 10, 1975) is an American beach volleyball player. He teams up with Kevin Wong and has teamed up with Brad Keenan or Matt Fuerbringer during most of his career. He married Kerri Walsh, a beach volleyball player with three gold and one bronze Olympic medals, in 2005.

== Personal life ==
Jennings, the youngest of 5 brothers, was born in Las Vegas, Nevada. He received a degree in Sociology from Brigham Young University. Casey is a practicing Mormon.

Jennings married Hilary Clark on June 5, 1999, and filed for divorce on November 17, 2000. Reasons for the divorce were not disclosed.

On December 4, 2005, he married Olympic Gold Medalist Kerri Walsh in Palm Springs, California, where many AVP players were in attendance. He gave her a ring inscribed with "My Six Feet of Sunshine," a nickname Kerri was given when they first met. On December 3, 2008, Walsh announced to Access Hollywood that she and her husband were expecting their first child and that the baby might have been conceived in Beijing. On May 22, 2009, Walsh gave birth to son Joseph Michael Jennings in Los Angeles. As of 2012 Jennings and Walsh live in Redondo Beach, California. On May 19, 2010, Walsh delivered their second son, Sundance Thomas Jennings. On April 6, 2013, Walsh delivered the couple's first daughter, Scout Margery, with whom she was five weeks pregnant when she won her third gold medal at the London Olympics.

== Career ==
During his years at Brigham Young University, Jennings was a member of the 1999 NCAA National Championship team. He and his former partner, Matt Fuerbringer, captured their first victory at Belmar, New Jersey in 2004.

Jennings along with partner Kevin Wong successfully ended the 2010 season by capturing gold at the Swatch FIVB World Tour by beating the Brazilian duo of Benjamin Insfran and Bruno Schmidt at The Hague, Netherlands.
