= Hans Stolfus =

American beach volleyball player (born 1976)

Personal information
- Nationality: American
- Born: Solon, Iowa, U.S.
- Hometown: Newport Coast, California, U.S.
- Height: 6 ft 5 in (196 cm)

Beach volleyball information

Current teammate
Years	Teammate
2009	Anthony Medel

Previous teammates
Years	Teammate
2007	Scott Wong
Medal record
Men's beach volleyball
Representing the United States
Pan American Games
Silver medal – second place	2007 Rio de Janeiro	Beach
NORCECA Beach Volleyball Circuit
Gold medal – first place	2009 Guatemala	Beach
Gold medal – first place	2007 Boca Chica	Beach

Hans Stolfus (born in Solon, Iowa) is a male beach volleyball player from the United States who won the silver medal in the men's beach team competition at the 2007 Pan American Games in Rio de Janeiro, Brazil, partnering with Ty Loomis.
