= Annett Davis =

American beach volleyball player (born 1973)

Personal information
- Born: September 22, 1973 (age 53)
- Height: 5 ft 11 in (1.80 m)
Medal record
Women's beach volleyball
Representing the United States
World Championships
Silver medal – second place	1999 Marseille	Beach
World Tour
Silver medal – second place	2004 Shanghai	Beach
Silver medal – second place	2004 Stavanger	Beach
Silver medal – second place	2004 Marseille	Beach
Bronze medal – third place	2004 Klagenfurt	Beach

Annett Davis (born September 22, 1973) is an American beach volleyball player, who won the silver medal at the 1999 Beach Volleyball World Championships, alongside Jenny Johnson Jordan.

== Career ==
Throughout her career, she has partnered with Jenny Johnson Jordan.

In 1999, she and Johnson Jordan were the winningest USA men's or women's pro beach volleyball team with over $200,000 in winnings.

Davis was named "Queen of the beach" in the Honolulu AVP tournament.

Davis and Johnson Jordan missed the 2005 AVP tour because of their pregnancies.

http://www.bvbinfo.com/player.asp?ID=1198

	Best Finish	Winnings
United States	1st (11 times)	$652,950
AVP	1st (8 times)	$537,325
AVP CUERVO	3rd	$0
AVP HWN*	1st (4 times)	$26,625
BVA	1st (2 times)	$27,750
NVL	2nd	$4,375
P&R	2nd	$4,000
Pro Beach	7th	$3,688
USAV	1st	$32,000
Wide Open	2nd	$5,750
WPVA	2nd	$6,438
Bonus Money		$5,000
International	1st (2 times)	$221,225
FIVB	1st (2 times)	$221,225
Overall	1st (13 times)	$874,175

== Personal life ==
Davis currently resides in Valencia, California with husband Byron and two children, Mya (born 2001) and Victoria (born 2005).
