= Elaine Youngs =

American beach volleyball player (born 1970)

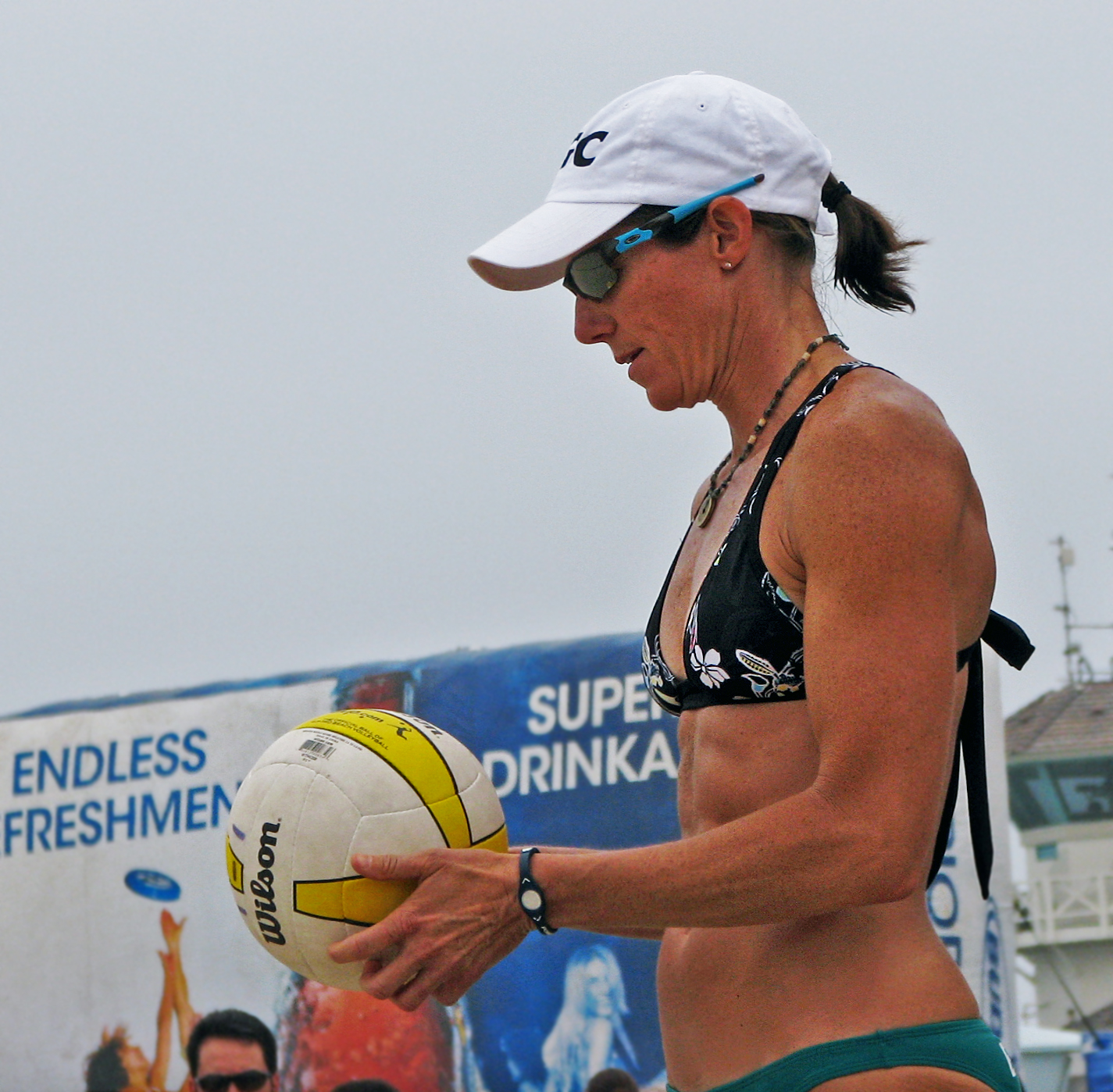
- Youngs in 2010

Personal information
- Full name: Elaine Clara Marie Hermenia Youngs
- Nickname: E.Y.
- Born: February 14, 1970 (age 56); Orange, California, U.S.
- Hometown: Lake Forest, California, U.S.
- Height: 6 ft 0 in (1.83 m)

Beach volleyball information
Years	Teammate
2011; 2010; 2006–2009; 2005–2006; 2002–2004; 2001; 1999–2000; 1998; 1997	Rachel Scott; Misty May-Treanor; Nicole Branagh; Rachel Wacholder; Holly McPeak; Barbra Fontana; Liz Masakayan; Nancy Reno; Liz Masakayan

Indoor volleyball information
- Position: Outside hitter
- Number: 15 (national team)
Medal record
Representing the United States
Women's beach volleyball
Olympic Games
Bronze medal – third place	2004 Athens	Beach
World Championships
Bronze medal – third place	1999 Marseille	Beach
World Tour
Gold medal – first place	2002 Stavanger	Beach
Gold medal – first place	2002 Marseille	Beach
Gold medal – first place	2002 Rhodes	Beach
Gold medal – first place	2002 Vitória	Beach
Gold medal – first place	2004 Shanghai	Beach
Gold medal – first place	2004 Stavanger	Beach
Gold medal – first place	2008 Barcelona	Beach
Silver medal – second place	2002 Maoming	Beach
Silver medal – second place	2003 Berlin	Beach
Silver medal – second place	2004 Rhodes	Beach
Silver medal – second place	2005 Klagenfurt	Beach
Silver medal – second place	2007 Phuket	Beach
Silver medal – second place	2008 Moscow	Beach
Silver medal – second place	2009 Klagenfurt	Beach
Bronze medal – third place	2002 Montreal	Beach
Bronze medal – third place	2002 Klagenfurt	Beach
Bronze medal – third place	2004 Gstaad	Beach
Bronze medal – third place	2004 Berlin	Beach
Bronze medal – third place	2005 Brazil	Beach
Bronze medal – third place	2005 Acapulco	Beach
Bronze medal – third place	2007 St. Petersburg	Beach
Bronze medal – third place	2007 Brazil	Beach
Bronze medal – third place	2008 Seoul	Beach
Bronze medal – third place	2008 Paris	Beach
Bronze medal – third place	2009 Gstaad	Beach
Women's volleyball
Goodwill Games
Silver medal – second place	1994 Saint Petersburg	Indoor

Elaine Clara Marie Hermenia Youngs (born February 14, 1970, in Orange, California) is an American former professional volleyball player who competed both indoors and on the beach.

Youngs attended UCLA, where as a freshman she started on a team that went undefeated through the regular season. They reached the semi-finals of the NCAA tournament, where they lost to Texas. The following year the Bruins reached the semi-finals again, where they lost to a powerful squad from Nebraska. A knee injury caused her to miss the 1990 season. She was red-shirted, returning for the 1991 season to help the team to win the national title. The team reached the championship match again in 1992, losing to Stanford. Youngs led the Bruins to the Final Four in each of the four seasons that she played. She also earned All-American honors in each of those four years. Youngs also spent two seasons playing on the Bruins basketball team, averaging 5.7 points per game. She graduated in 1993 with a degree in history.

Youngs was on the USA Volleyball indoor team and won a silver medal at the 1994 Goodwill Games. She also played in the 1996 Olympics, where the women placed seventh.

Nicknamed "EY", Youngs beach career started in 1997, winning third place in her first pro beach volleyball tournament. In 1997 and then 1999–2000 Youngs partnered with Liz Masakayan who later became Youngs coach from 2004 through 2008. The duo missed going to the 2000 Sydney Olympics by 50 points. In 1998 Youngs partnered with Nancy Reno until Nancy retired from pro beach volleyball. In 2001 Youngs partnered with Barbra Fontana, and from 2002 to 2004 partnered with Holly McPeak, winning the Beach Volleyball bronze medal together in the 2004 Athens Olympics. She teamed with Rachel Wacholder for the 2005 and much of the 2006 season. In August 2006, Wacholder left Youngs and partnered with Jennifer Kessy Boss and Youngs replaced Wacholder with Nicole Branagh for the 2007 AVP season. On September 8, 2007, Youngs won the Goddess of the Beach tournament for the first time in Las Vegas, Nevada. Branagh and Youngs achieved fifth place in the 2008 Beijing Olympics and continued playing together in the 2009 season. In 2010, Nicole Branagh partnered with Misty May-Treanor, replacing Kerri Walsh. Youngs retired from professional volleyball at the end of the 2010 season.

In 2002 Youngs was chosen as the MVP of the Association of Volleyball Professionals. In 2004 she teamed with Holly McPeak to win the bronze medal at the Summer Olympics in Athens. In her career Youngs won 51 professional beach volleyball tournaments. On October 6, 2006, she was inducted into the UCLA Athletics Hall of Fame.

== Personal life ==
Youngs currently works as a realtor in Durango, Colorado. During the winter, she enjoys "everything outdoors," including snowboarding, snowshoeing, hiking, camping and cross-country skiing.
