= Nicole Branagh =

American volleyball player

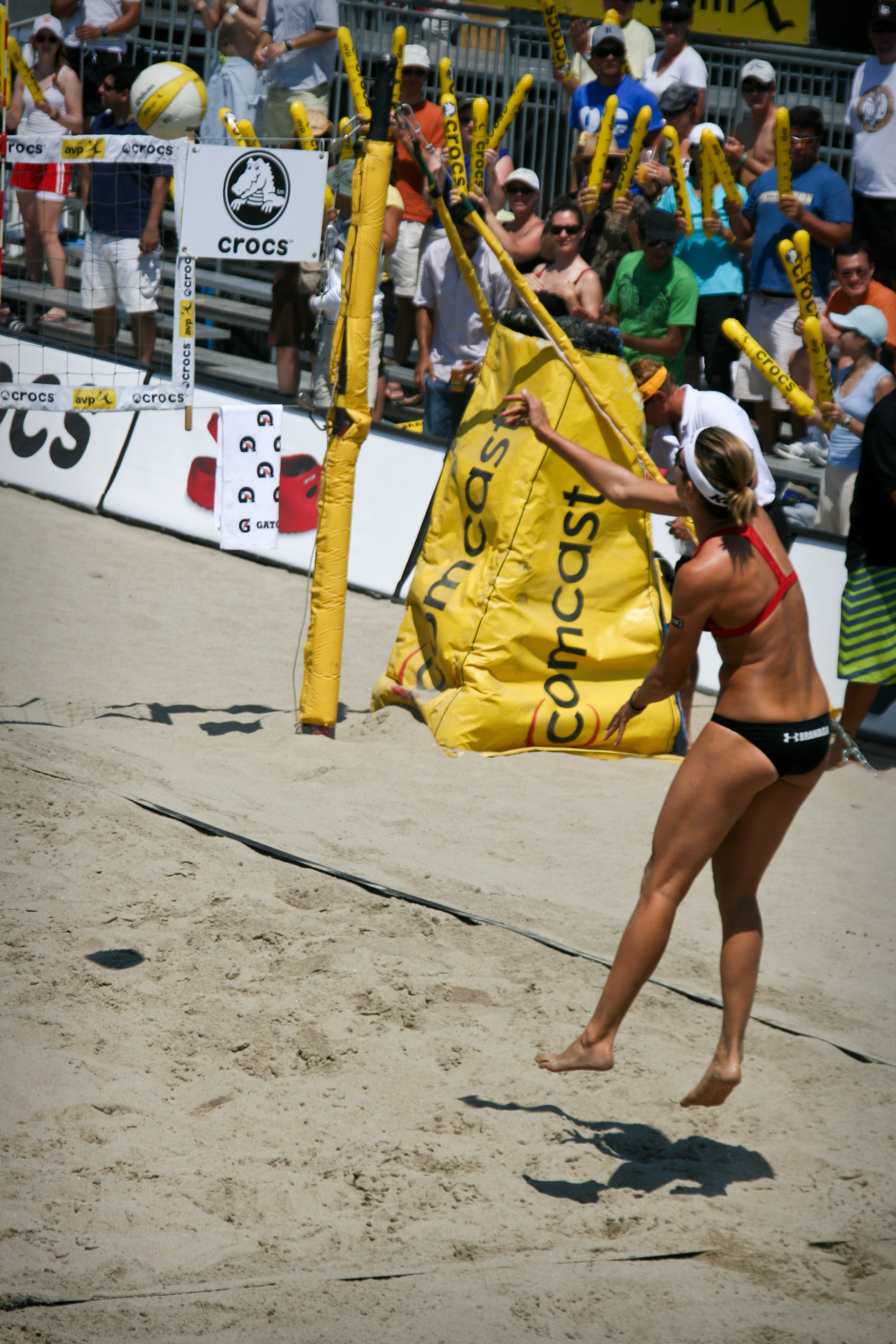
- Branagh serving at the 2009 AVP San Francisco Open finals

Personal information
- Nationality: United States
- Born: Nicole Christine Branagh; January 31, 1979 (age 47); Orinda, California, U.S.
- Hometown: Torrance, California, U.S.
- Height: 6 ft 1 in (1.85 m)

Beach volleyball information

Current teammate
Years	Teammate
2010, 2012, 2017	Kerri Walsh

Previous teammates
Years	Teammate
2005, 2011; 2006–2009; 2006	Angie Akers; Elaine Youngs; Holly McPeak
Medal record
Women's volleyball
Representing the United States
World Tour
Gold medal – first place	2008 Barcelona	Beach
Gold medal – first place	2008 Dubai	Beach
Gold medal – first place	2010 Phuket	Beach
Silver medal – second place	2007 Phuket	Beach
Silver medal – second place	2008 Moscow	Beach
Silver medal – second place	2008 Phuket	Beach
Silver medal – second place	2009 Klagenfurt	Beach
Bronze medal – third place	2007 St. Petersburg	Beach
Bronze medal – third place	2007 Brazil	Beach
Bronze medal – third place	2008 Seoul	Beach
Bronze medal – third place	2008 Paris	Beach
Bronze medal – third place	2008 Sanya	Beach
Bronze medal – third place	2009 Gstaad	Beach
Bronze medal – third place	2010 Stavanger	Beach
Pan American Games
Bronze medal – third place	2003 Santo Domingo	Team

Nicole Christine Branagh (born January 31, 1979, in Orinda, California) is an American volleyball player. She has represented the United States in international competition as a member of both the indoor and beach national teams. With partner Elaine Youngs, Branagh competed in the beach volleyball tournament at the 2008 Summer Olympics, finishing fifth. She currently plays beach volleyball professionally as a right-side defender.

== Career ==
Branagh played collegiately at the University of Minnesota. She was twice named to the All-America Second Team as an outside hitter. She also was the Big Ten's co-Player of the Year in her senior season. Following graduation, she played for the United States women's national volleyball team from 2001 to 2003, finishing her national career after the 2003 Pan American Games, where she won a bronze medal and was the top scorer.

After spending the 2004 season as a volunteer assistant coach at Cal State Fullerton, Branagh began playing beach volleyball on the AVP Pro Tour and the FIVB World Tour. She has won 17 AVP events and 3 FIVB World Tour events over the course of her career. She was named the AVP Rookie of the Year in 2005 and the Most Improved Player in 2006 and 2008. She partnered with Holly McPeak for much of the 2006 season, before teaming up with Elaine Youngs for the remainder of the 2006 season and up until the 2009 season. Branagh and Youngs competed at the 2008 Summer Olympics where they came in fifth.

== Personal life ==
Branagh lives in Southern California with her wife and two children.

Awards
Preceded by Laura Ludwig (GER); Tamsin Barnett (AUS)	Women's FIVB World Tour "Most Improved"; 2008	Succeeded by Marleen van Iersel (NED)
