= Michael Lambert (volleyball) =

American volleyball player

Mike Lambert
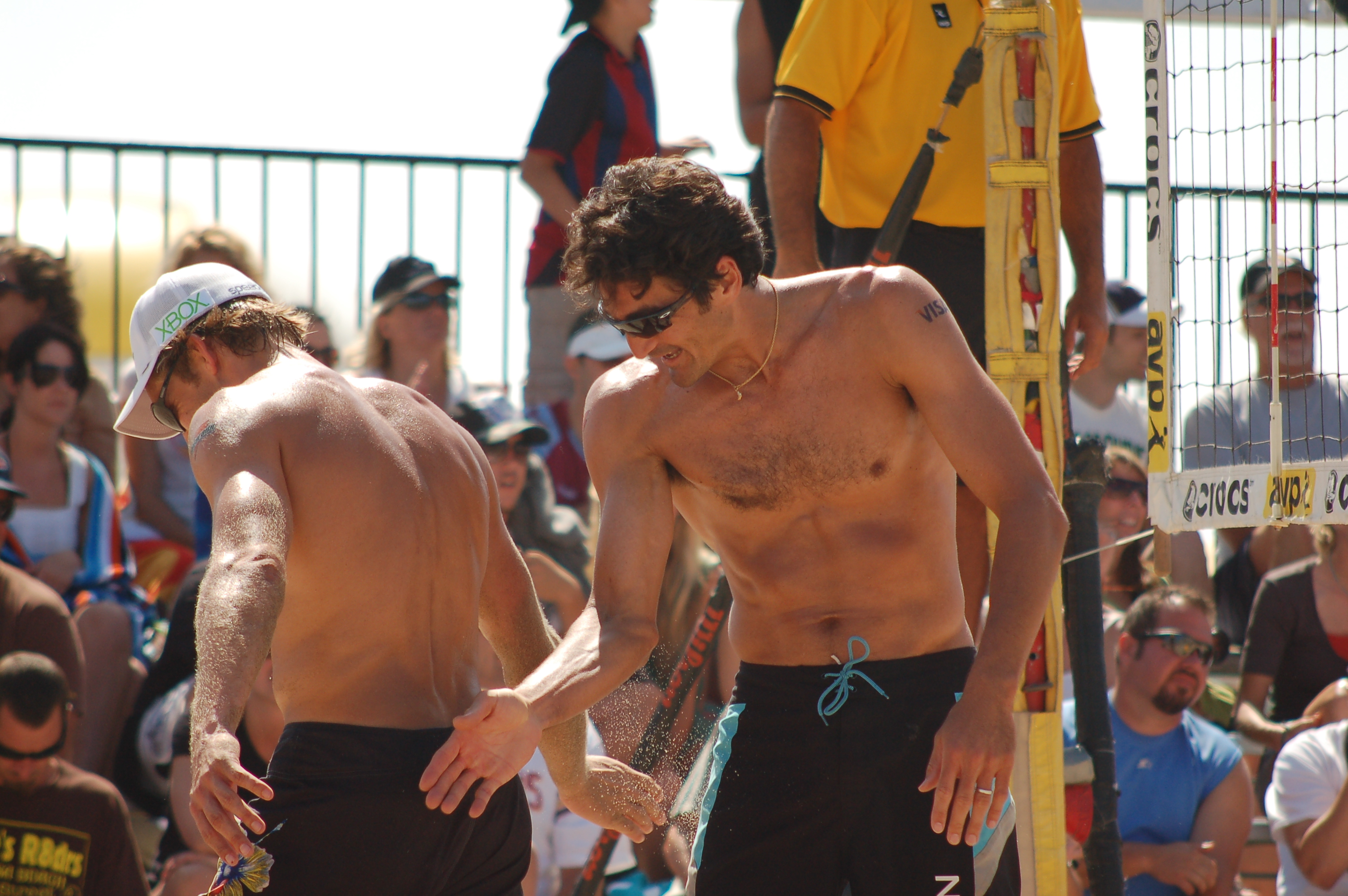

Personal information
- Full name: Michael Allen Lambert
- Born: April 14, 1974 (age 52); Honolulu, Hawaii, U.S.
- Height: 6 ft 5 in (196 cm)
- Weight: 205 lb (93 kg)
- Spike: 140 in (356 cm)
- Block: 127 in (323 cm)
- Education: Stanford University

Volleyball information
- Position: Opposite
- Number: 14 (1996); 3 (2000)

National team
1995–1996, 1998–2000	United States
Medal record
Men's beach volleyball
Representing the United States
World Tour
Bronze medal – third place	2006 Croatia	Beach
Bronze medal – third place	2007 Paris	Beach

Michael Allen Lambert (born April 14, 1974) is an American former volleyball player who is a two-time Olympian with the United States national volleyball team. His team finished ninth place at the 1996 Summer Olympics in Atlanta and eleventh at the 2000 Summer Olympics in Sydney.

== Early life ==
Lambert went to Punahou School in Honolulu, Hawaii along with Stein Metzger. His subsequent partnership with Metzger in the AVP resulted in nine titles.

== College ==
Lambert played volleyball at Stanford University. He and fellow AVP player Matt Fuerbringer were members of the 1997 NCAA Championship team for volleyball. He was the Most Outstanding Player of the 1997 NCAA Championship tournament. He was also a three-time All-American. Lambert graduated from Stanford in 1997 with a degree in political science.

== Beach volleyball ==
In 2004, Lambert was selected as the AVP Most Valuable Player, the AVP Best Offensive Player, and part of the AVP Team of the Year with partner Karch Kiraly. In his career, Lambert won 16 tournaments and $520,000 in prizes playing beach volleyball.

In 2018, Lambert was inducted to the California Beach Volleyball Hall of Fame.

== Personal life ==
Lambert lives in Costa Mesa, California with his wife, Deborah, and their two children Jack and Sveva.

== Awards ==
- Three-time All-American
- NCAA Champion — 1997
- NCAA Championship Most Outstanding Player — 1997
- AVP Most Valuable Player — 2004
- AVP Best Offensive Player — 2004
- AVP Team of the Year — 2004
- California Beach Volleyball Hall of Fame — 2018
