= Jenny Pavley =

American beach volleyball player (born 1976)

Personal information
- Born: June 17, 1976 (age 50); Agoura Hills, California, U.S.
- Height: 5 ft 8 in (173 cm)

Beach volleyball information
Teammate
Marsha Miller
Medal record
Women's beach volleyball
Representing the United States
Pan American Games
| Silver medal – second place | 1999 Winnipeg | Beach |

Jenny Pavley (born June 17, 1976) is a beach volleyball player from the United States. She won the silver medal in the women's beach team competition at the 1999 Pan American Games in Winnipeg, Manitoba, Canada, partnering with Marsha Miller.
