= Dax Holdren =

American beach volleyball player (born 1972)

Personal information
- Full name: Daxton Holdren
- Born: September 4, 1972 (age 54); Santa Barbara, California, U.S.
- Height: 5 ft 3 in (160 cm)
- Education: Santa Barbara City College
Medal record
Men's beach volleyball
Representing the United States
World Championships
Silver medal – second place	2003 Rio de Janeiro	Beach

Daxton Holdren (born September 4, 1972 in Santa Barbara, California) is an American former professional beach volleyball player. Holdren played on the AVP tour with Jeff Nygaard just before his retirement.

Holdren was a late-comer to the sport of volleyball and did not begin playing until his junior year in high school. He joined the AVP in 1997 and was the tour's Rookie of the Year. He started his career playing with Todd Rogers, a teammate of his at San Marcos High School in Santa Barbara. The duo had eight wins together, including a World Tour victory in 2000 that was reached through qualification. Following his partnership with Rogers, Holdren partnered with Eric Fonoimoana for two AVP seasons. In 2002, they were considered the dominant partnership on tour. Fonoimoana split with Holdren in 2003.

Holdren represented the United States with partner Stein Metzger at the 2004 Summer Olympics in Athens, Greece, where they finished fifth. The duo were not expected to win medals despite their unexpected win of the silver medal at the 2003 Beach Volleyball World Championships in Rio de Janeiro, Brazil. Holdren and Metzger split as partners following their finish out of the medals in Athens; both Holdren and Metzger are smallish players for beach volleyball and had no plans to continue as partners, leading to Holdren's pairing with Nygaard. During the 2005 AVP season, Holdren and Nygaard were the second-ranked pair in the league. Holdren himself finished second on the tour in digs with 909. In the 2007 season, Nygaard's treatment for cancer reduced their play time together. While Nygaard underwent treatment, Holdren partnered with Kevin Wong in several tournaments.

In his career, Holdren had 14 total wins on the AVP tour (eight with Rogers, five with Fonoimoana, one with Nygaard), most recently coming in 2005. He has had several sponsors, notably being sponsored by Nautica along with Mike Lambert.
