= Tyra Turner =

American beach volleyball player

Personal information
- Born: Tyra Harper; July 21, 1976 (age 50) Fort Myers Beach, Florida, U.S.
- Height: 6 ft 1 in (185 cm)
Medal record
Women's beach volleyball
Representing the United States
World Tour
Silver medal – second place	2008 Mazury	Beach
Silver medal – second place	2008 Paris	Beach
Silver medal – second place	2008 Phuket	Beach
Silver medal – second place	2009 Phuket	Beach
Silver medal – second place	2010 Seoul	Beach
Bronze medal – third place	2007 Paris	Beach
Bronze medal – third place	2008 Sanya	Beach
Bronze medal – third place	2009 Sanya	Beach
Bronze medal – third place	2010 Milner	Beach

Tyra Turner (née Harper, born July 21, 1976) is a former professional beach volleyball player from the United States who played on the AVP and FIVB tours.

In her beach volleyball career, Turner won $600,000 in prizes.

== College ==
Turner is a graduate of the University of Central Florida, where she played volleyball all four years. In 1998, she was named UCF's Scholar Athlete of the Year and Female Athlete of the Year. Turner was inducted into the UCF Athletic Hall of Fame in 2004.

== Personal life ==
Turner has been married to fellow former AVP professional Chad Turner since January 2005. They have three sons, Myles, Blake, and Preston, and live in Fort Myers, Florida.

== Awards ==
- UCF Athletic Hall of Fame 2004
