= Barbra Fontana =

American beach volleyball player (born 1965)

Personal information
- Full name: Barbra Fontana
- Nationality: United States
- Born: September 8, 1965 (age 61)
- Hometown: Manhattan Beach, California, U.S.
- Height: 5 ft 6 in (1.68 m)

Barbra Fontana (born September 8, 1965) is a professional beach volleyball player from the United States who plays on the AVP Tour. Fontana was the seventh woman to earn $1 million on the AVP Tour.

Fontana graduated from Stanford University in 1987 and earned a law degree in 1991.
