= Matt Fuerbringer =

American beach volleyball player

Personal information
- Full name: Matthew Fuerbringer
- Born: January 29, 1974 (age 52); Costa Mesa, California, U.S.
- Hometown: Redondo Beach, California, U.S.
- Height: 6 ft 8 in (203 cm)
- Education: Stanford University

Beach volleyball information

Current teammate
Years	Teammate
2003–present	Casey Jennings
Medal record
Men's beach volleyball
Representing the United States
World Tour
Silver medal – second place	2009 Myslowice	Beach
Silver medal – second place	2010 Klagenfurt	Beach
Silver medal – second place	2011 Québec	Beach
Silver medal – second place	2012 Brasilia	Beach
Bronze medal – third place	2008 VIP	Beach
Bronze medal – third place	2010 Milner	Beach

Matthew "Matt" Fuerbringer (born January 29, 1974) is an American former beach volleyball player. Throughout his AVP career, he teamed up with Casey Jennings.

== High school and college ==
Fuerbringer was born in Costa Mesa, California. He attended Estancia High School. He received a degree in American Studies at Stanford University.

He spent five years playing professional volleyball in Europe and became fluent in Spanish. At his years at Stanford, Fuerbringer was named four-time All-American, Freshman of the Year, Outstanding Senior Athlete and was a member of the 1997 NCAA National Championship team. Fuerbringer remains as Stanford's leader in kills, and also ranks in the top five in aces and blocks.

== Coaching ==
As of April 1, 2013, Fuerbringer is an assistant coach for the U.S. Men's National Volleyball Team.

In 2024, Fuerbringer was selected as the head coach for LOVB Madison.

== Personal life ==
Fuerbringer currently lives in Redondo Beach, California with his wife Joy McKienzie, who is a former All-American at Long Beach State and owns the Mizuno Long Beach Volleyball Club. He also owns his own volleyball club called Rockstar. They have a daughter, Charlie, born in 2006, who plays volleyball for Wisconsin, as well as a son, Mateo, born in 2009.
