= Stein Metzger =

American beach volleyball player

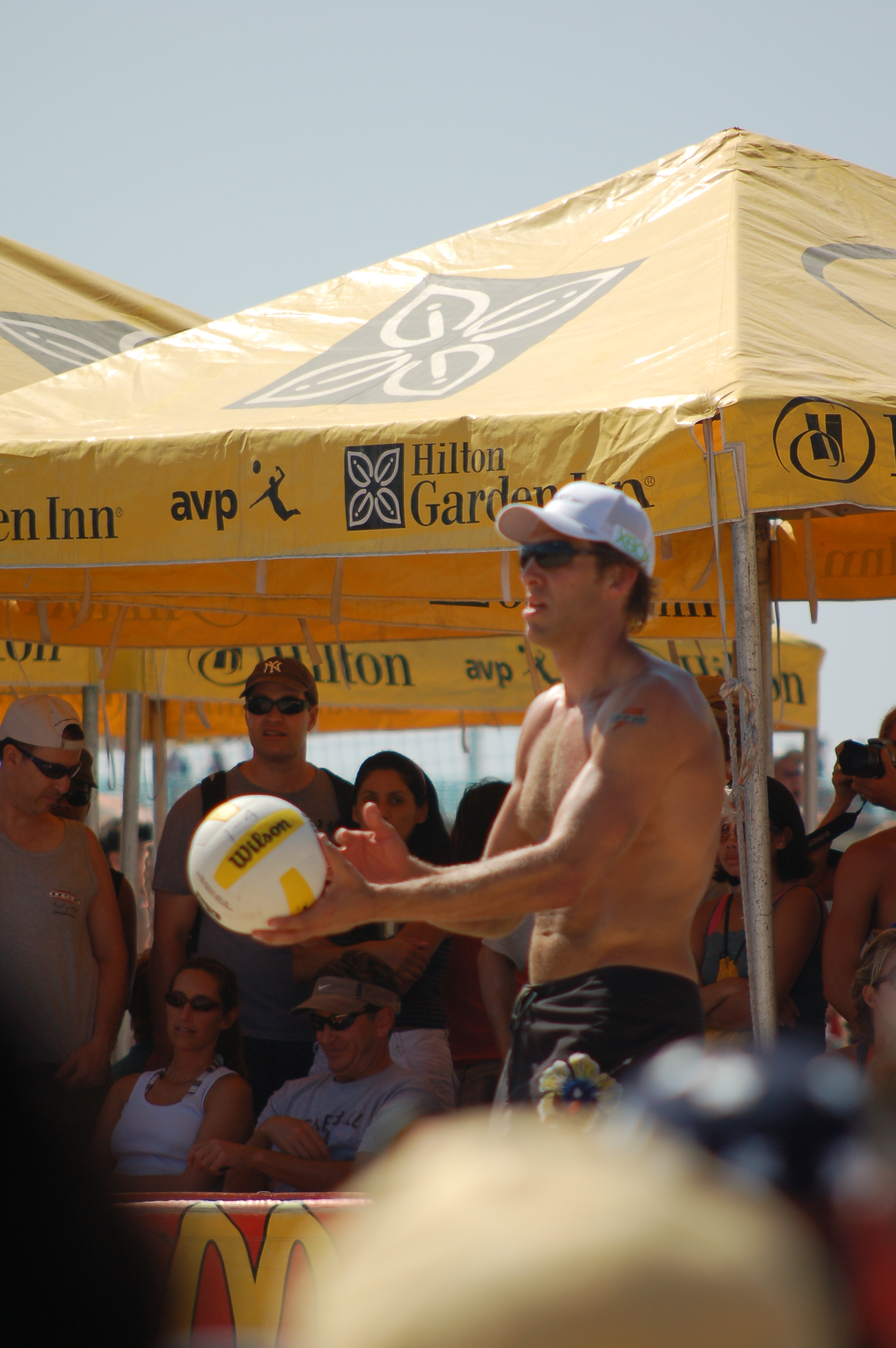

Personal information
- Born: November 17, 1972 (age 53); Honolulu, Hawaii, U.S.
- Height: 6 ft 3 in (191 cm)
- Education: University of California, Los Angeles

Volleyball information
- Position: Setter
- Number: 5 (UCLA)
Medal record
Men's beach volleyball
Representing the United States
World Championships
Silver medal – second place	2003 Rio de Janeiro	Beach
World Tour
Gold medal – first place	2002 Espinho	Beach
Silver medal – second place	2002 Fortaleza	Beach
Silver medal – second place	2003 Klagenfurt	Beach
Silver medal – second place	2005 Paris	Beach
Silver medal – second place	2008 Klagenfurt	Beach
Bronze medal – third place	2002 Gstaad	Beach
Bronze medal – third place	2002 Montreal	Beach
Bronze medal – third place	2005 Brazil	Beach
Bronze medal – third place	2005 South Africa	Beach
Bronze medal – third place	2006 Croatia	Beach
Bronze medal – third place	2007 Paris	Beach

Stein Metzger (born November 17, 1972) is a former beach volleyball player from the United States. He is the head coach of the beach volleyball team at the University of Texas.

== High school ==
Metzger grew up surfing and playing beach volleyball at the Outrigger Canoe Club in Honolulu. He played indoor volleyball at Punahou High School.

== College ==
Metzger played college men's indoor volleyball at UCLA as a setter, where he won three NCAA National championships under legendary coach Al Scates. He earned AVCA All-American for three consecutive seasons, winning the 1996 NCAA MVP and William G. Morgan Award for most outstanding player. He was selected to the NCAA Championship All-Tournament Team in 1995 and 1996. He graduated with a degree in environmental studies.

On October 9, 2009, Metzger was inducted into the UCLA Athletics Hall of Fame.

== Beach volleyball ==
2001–2003

Prior to qualifying for the 2004 Summer Olympics, Metzger spent time competing internationally with former long-time partner Kevin Wong. In 2001, with Wong as his partner, Metzger won his first two AVP events, in Santa Barbara and Manhattan Beach on consecutive weekends. The pair won the 2001 FIVB event in Switzerland and the bronze medal at the Goodwill Games in Australia. Metzger and Wong also won in Portugal in 2002.

Metzger won a silver medal in Rio at the World Championships in 2003 with Dax Holdren.

2004 Olympics

Metzger made his Olympic beach volleyball debut at the 2004 Summer Olympics in Athens, Greece, where he and partner Holdren finished fifth, after having won the silver medal the previous year at the 2003 Beach Volleyball World Championships in Rio de Janeiro, Brazil.

2005

In 2005, Metzger teamed up with the 2004 Most Improved Player, Jake Gibb. The duo won both of their first two events together, becoming the third team since 1990 to accomplish that. They won in Belmar, then placed second in an FIVB Grand Slam event in Paris, logging the highest finish by an American team in 2005. The win in Manhattan Beach in 2005 made Gibb and Metzger the second team to win four domestic tournaments in a season since the turn of the century, and also marked the first time since the 2003 season opener that a number one-seeded team won an AVP open event.

Metzger led the 2005 Tour with four wins, as well as in points. He also led the Tour in digs in 2005 (950), ranked second in hitting percentage (.452), and third in kills (1,314). In 2006, he was third in kills (7.17 per game) and 10th in digs (4.12 per game).

2006

In 2006, Metzger played with his high school teammate, Mike Lambert, and they advanced to the Final Four in fourteen of the fifteen team events, winning five times. They formed the only team to not have a losing record against any other team that season.

== Coaching ==
Metzger was the head coach of the women's beach volleyball team at UCLA. Metzger's UCLA women's beach volleyball team won the 2018 NCAA title on May 6, 2018, defeating FSU.

Metzger joined the University of Texas in 2023 as the head coach of their beach volleyball team.

== Personal life ==
Stein has been involved in an instructional volleyball website known as Volleyball 1on1, involving the creation of instructional volleyball videos featuring coaching from himself and other well-known players.

== See also ==
- World Fit
