= Beach volleyball at the 2008 Summer Olympics – Men's team rosters =

This article shows all participating team squads at the men's beach volleyball tournament at the 2008 Summer Olympics in Beijing.

== Angola ==
Team Fernandes-Morais

#	Name	Date of birth	Height	Spike	Block
1	Emanuel Fernandes	July 25, 1967 (age 41)	190 cm (6 ft 3 in)	-	-
2	Morais Abreu	July 10, 1968 (age 40)	183 cm (6 ft 0 in)	350	325

== Argentina ==
Team Conde-Baracetti

#	Name	Date of birth	Height	Spike	Block
1	Martín Conde	August 25, 1971 (age 36)	186 cm (6 ft 1 in)	330	300
2	Mariano Baracetti	July 12, 1974 (age 34)	194 cm (6 ft 4 in)	-	-

== Australia ==
Team Schacht-Slack

#	Name	Date of birth	Height	Spike	Block
1	Andrew Schacht	May 22, 1973 (age 35)	191 cm (6 ft 3 in)	335	320
2	Joshua Slack	December 16, 1976 (age 31)	191 cm (6 ft 3 in)	350	338

== Austria ==
Team Doppler-Gartmayer

#	Name	Date of birth	Height	Spike	Block
1	Clemens Doppler	September 6, 1980 (age 27)	200 cm (6 ft 7 in)	-	-
2	Peter Gartmayer	February 25, 1978 (age 30)	193 cm (6 ft 4 in)	-	-

Team Gosch-Horst

#	Name	Date of birth	Height	Spike	Block
1	Florian Gosch	August 16, 1980 (age 27)	196 cm (6 ft 5 in)	-	-
2	Alexander Horst	December 20, 1982 (age 25)	186 cm (6 ft 1 in)	-	-

== Brazil ==
Team Ricardo-Emanuel

#	Name	Date of birth	Height	Spike	Block
1	Ricardo Santos	January 6, 1975 (age 33)	200 cm (6 ft 7 in)	350	330
2	Emanuel Rego	April 15, 1973 (age 35)	190 cm (6 ft 3 in)	320	304

Team Márcio Araújo-Fábio Luiz

#	Name	Date of birth	Height	Spike	Block
1	Márcio Araújo	October 12, 1973 (age 34)	192 cm (6 ft 4 in)	-	-
2	Fábio Luiz Magalhães	March 13, 1979 (age 29)	204 cm (6 ft 8 in)	-	-

== China ==
Team Xu-Wu

#	Name	Date of birth	Height	Spike	Block
1	Xu Linyin	March 20, 1986 (age 22)	200 cm (6 ft 7 in)	-	-
2	Wu Penggen	May 7, 1982 (age 26)	197 cm (6 ft 6 in)	-	-

== Estonia ==
Team Kais-Vesik

#	Name	Date of birth	Height	Spike	Block
1	Kristjan Kais	March 3, 1976 (age 32)	188 cm (6 ft 2 in)	-	-
2	Rivo Vesik	July 15, 1980 (age 28)	198 cm (6 ft 6 in)	-	-

== Georgia ==
Team Geor-Gia

#	Name	Date of birth	Height	Spike	Block
1	Renato "Geor" Gomes	January 20, 1981 (age 27)	204 cm (6 ft 8 in)	325	310
2	Jorge "Gia" Terceiro	July 19, 1976 (age 32)	191 cm (6 ft 3 in)	315	300

== Germany ==
Team Brink-Dieckmann

#	Name	Date of birth	Height	Spike	Block
1	Julius Brink	July 6, 1982 (age 26)	192 cm (6 ft 4 in)	312	277
2	Christoph Dieckmann	January 7, 1976 (age 32)	198 cm (6 ft 6 in)	-	-

Team Klemperer-Koreng

#	Name	Date of birth	Height	Spike	Block
1	David Klemperer	June 22, 1980 (age 28)	187 cm (6 ft 2 in)	310	285
2	Eric Koreng	May 16, 1981 (age 27)	194 cm (6 ft 4 in)	330	315

== Italy ==
Team Lione-Amore

#	Name	Date of birth	Height	Spike	Block
1	Riccardo Lione	April 13, 1972 (age 36)	197 cm (6 ft 6 in)	-	-
2	Eugenio Amore	February 17, 1972 (age 36)	193 cm (6 ft 4 in)	-	-

== Japan ==
Team Asahi-Shiratori

#	Name	Date of birth	Height	Spike	Block
1	Kentaro Asahi	September 19, 1975 (age 32)	199 cm (6 ft 6 in)	-	-
2	Katsuhiro Shiratori	October 29, 1976 (age 31)	190 cm (6 ft 3 in)	318	303

== Latvia ==
Team Samoilovs-Pļaviņš

#	Name	Date of birth	Height	Spike	Block
1	Aleksandrs Samoilovs	April 6, 1985 (age 23)	195 cm (6 ft 5 in)	-	-
2	Mārtiņš Pļaviņš	May 8, 1985 (age 23)	190 cm (6 ft 3 in)	-	-

== Netherlands ==
Team Nummerdor-Schuil

#	Name	Date of birth	Height	Spike	Block
1	Reinder Nummerdor	September 10, 1976 (age 31)	194 cm (6 ft 4 in)	-	-
2	Richard Schuil	February 5, 1973 (age 35)	202 cm (6 ft 8 in)	340	330

Team Boersma-Ronnes

#	Name	Date of birth	Height	Spike	Block
1	Emiel Boersma	August 25, 1980 (age 27)	205 cm (6 ft 9 in)	-	-
2	Bram Ronnes	November 17, 1978 (age 29)	185 cm (6 ft 1 in)	-	-

== Norway ==
Team Kjemperud-Skarlund

#	Name	Date of birth	Height	Spike	Block
1	Jørre Kjemperud	August 31, 1968 (age 39)	189 cm (6 ft 2 in)	335	320
2	Tarjei Skarlund	November 6, 1978 (age 29)	191 cm (6 ft 3 in)	335	315

== Russia ==
Team Barsouk-Kolodinsky

#	Name	Date of birth	Height	Spike	Block
1	Dmitri Barsouk	January 20, 1980 (age 28)	193 cm (6 ft 4 in)	-	-
2	Igor Kolodinsky	July 7, 1983 (age 25)	197 cm (6 ft 6 in)	-	-

== Spain ==
Team Herrera-Mesa

#	Name	Date of birth	Height	Spike	Block
1	Pablo Herrera	June 29, 1982 (age 26)	193 cm (6 ft 4 in)	-	-
2	Raúl Mesa	April 16, 1982 (age 26)	190 cm (6 ft 3 in)	-	-

== Switzerland ==
Team Heyer-Heuscher

#	Name	Date of birth	Height	Spike	Block
1	Sascha Heyer	July 21, 1972 (age 36)	203 cm (6 ft 8 in)	350	340
2	Patrick Heuscher	December 22, 1976 (age 31)	194 cm (6 ft 4 in)	-	-

Team Laciga-Schnider

#	Name	Date of birth	Height	Spike	Block
1	Martin Laciga	January 25, 1975 (age 33)	195 cm (6 ft 5 in)	340	347
2	Jan Schnider	January 7, 1983 (age 25)	196 cm (6 ft 5 in)	-	-

== United States ==
Team Rogers-Dalhausser

#	Name	Date of birth	Height	Spike	Block
1	Todd Rogers	September 30, 1973 (age 34)	187 cm (6 ft 2 in)	-	-
2	Phil Dalhausser	January 26, 1980 (age 28)	206 cm (6 ft 9 in)	-	-

Team Gibb-Rosenthal

#	Name	Date of birth	Height	Spike	Block
1	Jake Gibb	February 6, 1976 (age 32)	200 cm (6 ft 7 in)	-	-
2	Sean Rosenthal	June 19, 1980 (age 28)	193 cm (6 ft 4 in)	-	-

== See also ==
- Beach volleyball at the 2008 Summer Olympics – Women's team rosters
