= Beach volleyball at the 2008 Summer Olympics – Men's tournament =

Men's beach volleyball at the Games of the XXIX Olympiad
- Venue: Beach Volleyball Ground
- Dates: August 9–22
- Competitors: 48 from 18 nations

Medalists
1st place, gold medalist(s)		Phil Dalhausser; Todd Rogers	United States
2nd place, silver medalist(s)		Márcio Araújo; Fabio Luiz Magalhães	Brazil
3rd place, bronze medalist(s)		Ricardo Santos; Emanuel Rego	Brazil

The men's Olympic beach volleyball tournament at the 2008 Summer Olympics in Beijing took place at the Beach Volleyball Ground at Chaoyang Park from August 9 to August 22.

Each of the 24 pairs in the tournament was placed in one of six groups of four teams apiece, and played a round-robin within that pool. The top two teams in each pool advanced to the Round of 16. The six third-place teams were ranked against each other, with ties being broken by the ratio of points won to lost. The best two advanced to the Round of 16, while the other four played two matches (#3 vs. #6 and #4 vs. #5) with the winners of those two matches advancing as well. The losers of those matches, along with the fourth-place teams in each group, were eliminated.

The 16 teams that advanced to the elimination rounds played a single-elimination tournament with a bronze medal match between the semifinal losers.

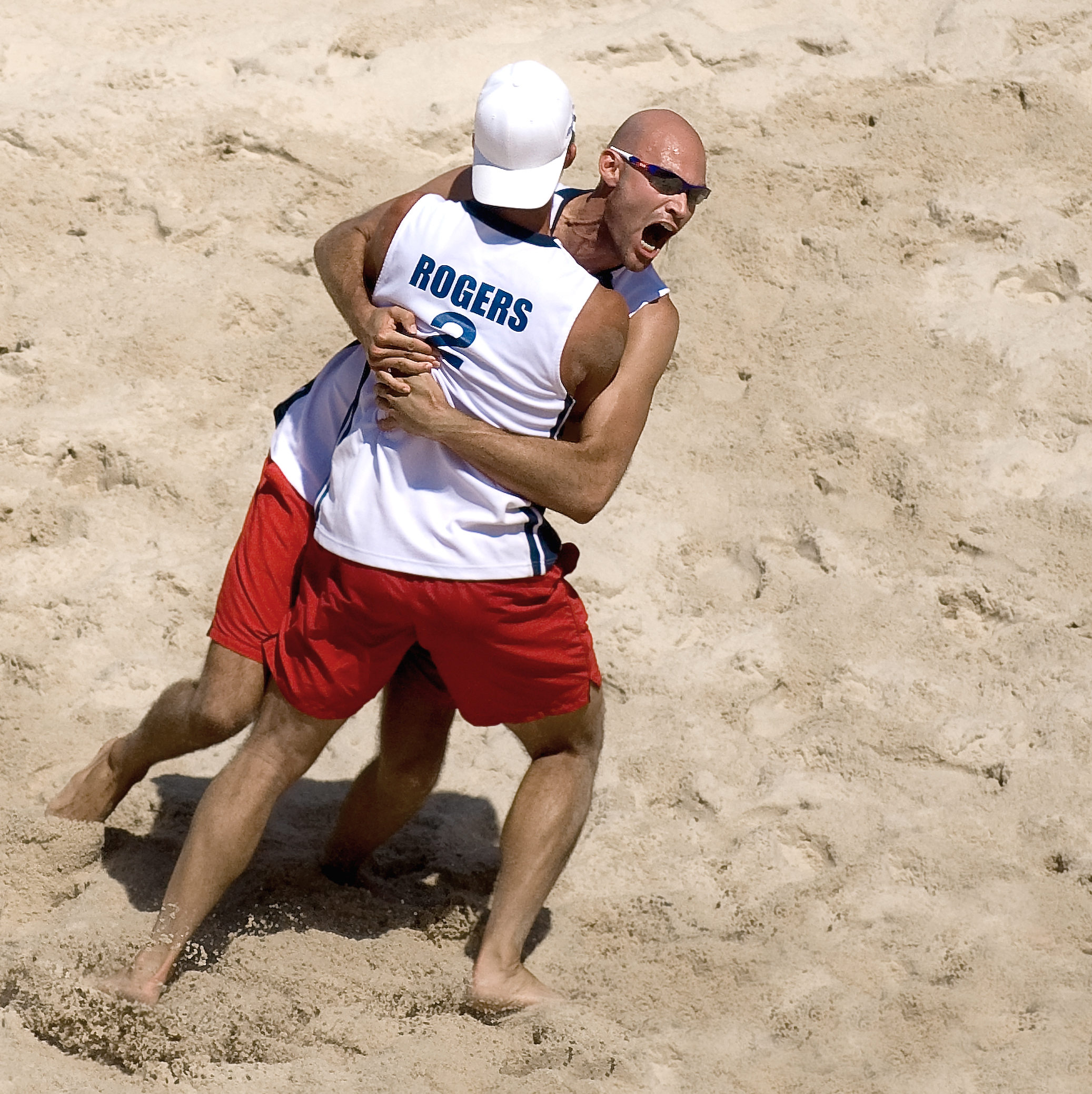
Dalhausser and Rogers celebrate their gold medal win.

The medals for the competition were presented by Beatrice Allen, IOC Member, Gambia; and the medalists' bouquets were presented by Ruben Acosta, FIVB President; Mexico.

== Qualification ==
The top eight finishes that a team had from January 1, 2007, to July 20, 2008, on the Swatch FIVB World Tour (2007 and 2008), SWATCH FIVB World Championships (2007) and on FIVB recognised Continental Championship Finals, counted towards Olympic qualification for the Beijing 2008 Olympic Games.

There were 24 teams competing at the Olympic Games, with a maximum of two teams per country.

Brazil had four teams in the top 10 of the FIVB Beach Volleyball Olympic Ranking, but only two teams from each country could participate in the Olympic Games. Also Germany, the USA, and the Netherlands had three teams each in the top 24.

=== Qualifiers ===
The official cut off date for Olympic qualification for beach volleyball was July 20, 2008. The final Olympic Qualification Ranking for the 24 teams, was announced confirmed by the FIVB on July 24, 2008.

If the host nation had a team in the top 6 teams on the FIVB Olympic ranking when the Olympic Games began, it was automatically seeded as #1; therefore China's team Xu - Wu (ranked as #5 on the Olympic ranking,) was seeded as #1. Accordingly, the #1 ranked Rogers - Dalhausser, was seeded as #2, Ricardo - Emanuel as #3, M. Araújo - Fabio Luiz as #4 and Nummerdor - Schuil as #5.

The Brazilian team Harley - Pedro, was placed as #5 on the Olympic ranking, but did not qualify because of the two teams per country rule. Harley - Pedro was ranked as #2 on the World ranking per July 21, 2008, and #1 per August 4, 2008.

No.	Rank	Team	NOC
FIVB Beach Volleyball Olympic Ranking
1	1	Rogers - Dalhausser	United States
2	2	Ricardo - Emanuel	Brazil
3	3	M. Araújo - Fabio Luiz	Brazil
5	4	Nummerdor - Schuil	Netherlands
6	5	Xu - Wu	China
7	6	Brink - Dieckmann Ch.	Germany
8	7	Barsouk - Kolodinsky	Russia
9	8	Klemperer - Koreng	Germany
12	9	Gibb - Rosenthal	United States
13	10	Schacht - Slack	Australia
14	11	Herrera - Mesa	Spain
15	12	Heyer - Heuscher	Switzerland
16	13	Conde - Baracetti	Argentina
17	14	Kais Kr. - Vesik	Estonia
18	15	Doppler - Gartmayer	Austria
19	16	Boersma E. - Ronnes	Netherlands
21	17	Geor - Gia	Georgia
22	18	Kjemperud - Skarlund	Norway
23	19	Gosch - Horst	Austria
24	20	Laciga M. - Schnider	Switzerland
25	21	Samoilovs - Pļaviņš	Latvia
28	22	Asahi - Shiratori	Japan
26	23	Lione - Amore*	Italy
84	24	Fernandes - Morais	Angola

* Matteo Varnier is replaced by Eugenio Amore on the Italian team, because of an injury to Varnier.

== Participating nations ==
- Angola (1)
- Argentina (1)
- Australia (1)
- Austria (2)
- Brazil (2)
- China (1)
- Estonia (1)
- Georgia (1)
- Germany (2)
- Italy (1)
- Japan (1)
- Latvia (1)
- Netherlands (2)
- Norway (1)
- Russia (1)
- Spain (1)
- Switzerland (2)
- United States (2)

== Preliminary round ==
Directly advance to Round of 16
3rd place/Lucky Loser playoffs
Eliminated

The two best teams from each group advanced to the quarterfinal round.

The composition of the preliminary rounds was announced confirmed on April 16, 2008.

The #1 seeded team was placed in pool A, #2 in pool B, #3 in C, #4 in D, #5 in E, and #6 in F. But if the host nation had a team in the top 6 teams, it was automatically seeded as #1. Therefore, China's team Xu-Wu (ranked as #5,) is placed in pool A.

There was held a draw of lots between seed #7 - #9, between #10 - #12, between #13 - #18, and between #19 - #24. The Drawing of lots was hosted by the 1 to 1 Energy Grand Slam, in Gstaad on July 26, as part of the 2008 SWATCH FIVB Beach Volleyball World Tour.

A team received 2 points for each match won, and 1 point for each match lost.

After the preliminary rounds, from August 9–14, 2008, the teams placed 1st and 2nd in each pool had qualified for the playoffs. The two best 3rd placed teams had also qualified. Two Lucky Loser matches qualified two more of the 3rd placed teams. The two 3rd placed teams that lost their Lucky Losers match, were out of the competition. Also out of the competition were teams placed 4th in their pool.

All times are China Standard Time (UTC+8)

=== Pool A ===
Rk	Team	Points	Won	Lost	PW	PL	SW	SL
1	Xu - Wu (CHN)	6	3	0	135	104	6	1
2	Herrera - Mesa (ESP)	5	2	1	114	107	4	2
3	Gosch - Horst (AUT)	4	1	2	111	133	2	5
4	Kais Kr. - Vesik (EST)	3	0	3	133	149	2	6

August 10, 2008; 10:00	Xu - Wu (CHN)	2–0	Gosch - Horst (AUT)	Beach Volleyball Ground
August 10, 2008; 10:00	(21–16, 21–15)			Beach Volleyball Ground

August 10, 2008; 22:00	Herrera - Mesa (ESP)	2–0	Kais Kr. - Vesik (EST)	Beach Volleyball Ground
August 10, 2008; 22:00	(21–18, 23–21)			Beach Volleyball Ground

August 12, 2008; 10:00	Xu - Wu (CHN)	2–1	Kais Kr. - Vesik (EST)	Beach Volleyball Ground
August 12, 2008; 10:00	(15–21, 21–11, 15–13)			Beach Volleyball Ground

August 12, 2008; 23:00	Herrera - Mesa (ESP)	2–0	Gosch - Horst (AUT)	Beach Volleyball Ground
August 12, 2008; 23:00	(21–14, 21–12)			Beach Volleyball Ground

August 14, 2008; 16:00	Xu - Wu (CHN)	2–0	Herrera - Mesa (ESP)	Beach Volleyball Ground
August 14, 2008; 16:00	(21–13, 21–15)			Beach Volleyball Ground

August 14, 2008; 17:00	Kais Kr. - Vesik (EST)	1–2	Gosch - Horst (AUT)	Beach Volleyball Ground
August 14, 2008; 17:00	(16–21, 21–18, 12–15)			Beach Volleyball Ground

=== Pool B ===
Rk	Team	Points	Won	Lost	PW	PL	SW	SL
1	Samoilovs - Pļaviņš (LAT)	5	2	1	139	134	4	3
2	Rogers - Dalhausser (USA)	5	2	1	121	92	4	2
3	Heyer - Heuscher (SUI)	4	1	2	120	129	3	4
4	Conde - Baracetti (ARG)	4	1	2	99	124	2	4

August 9, 2008; 21:00	Rogers - Dalhausser (USA)	0–2	Samoilovs - Pļaviņš (LAT)	Beach Volleyball Ground
August 9, 2008; 21:00	(19–21, 18–21)			Beach Volleyball Ground

August 9, 2008; 22:00	Heyer - Heuscher (SUI)	2–0	Conde - Baracetti (ARG)	Beach Volleyball Ground
August 9, 2008; 22:00	(21–13, 21–17)			Beach Volleyball Ground

August 11, 2008; 09:00	Conde - Baracetti (ARG)	2–0	Samoilovs - Pļaviņš (LAT)	Beach Volleyball Ground
August 11, 2008; 09:00	(23–21, 21–19)			Beach Volleyball Ground

August 11, 2008; 22:00	Rogers - Dalhausser (USA)	2–0	Heyer - Heuscher (SUI)	Beach Volleyball Ground
August 11, 2008; 22:00	(21–15, 21–10)			Beach Volleyball Ground

August 13, 2008; 09:00	Rogers - Dalhausser (USA)	2–0	Conde - Baracetti (ARG)	Beach Volleyball Ground
August 13, 2008; 09:00	(21–12, 21–13)			Beach Volleyball Ground

August 13, 2008; 18:00	Heyer - Heuscher (SUI)	1–2	Samoilovs - Pļaviņš (LAT)	Beach Volleyball Ground
August 13, 2008; 18:00	(17–21, 23–21, 13–15)			Beach Volleyball Ground

=== Pool C ===
Rk	Team	Points	Won	Lost	PW	PL	SW	SL
1	Ricardo-Emanuel (BRA)	6	3	0	126	88	6	0
2	Schacht - Slack (AUS)	5	2	1	115	102	4	2
3	Geor - Gia (GEO)	4	1	2	114	111	2	4
4	Fernandes - Morais (ANG)	3	0	3	72	126	0	6

August 9, 2008; 13:00	Ricardo-Emanuel (BRA)	2–0	Fernandes - Morais (ANG)	Beach Volleyball Ground
August 9, 2008; 13:00	(21–8, 21–13)			Beach Volleyball Ground

August 9, 2008; 14:00	Schacht - Slack (AUS)	2–0	Geor - Gia (GEO)	Beach Volleyball Ground
August 9, 2008; 14:00	(21–17, 21–19)			Beach Volleyball Ground

August 11, 2008; 10:00	Schacht - Slack (AUS)	2–0	Fernandes - Morais (ANG)	Beach Volleyball Ground
August 11, 2008; 10:00	(21–15, 21–9)			Beach Volleyball Ground

August 11, 2008; 13:00	Ricardo-Emanuel (BRA)	2–0	Geor - Gia (GEO)	Beach Volleyball Ground
August 11, 2008; 13:00	(21–19, 21–17)			Beach Volleyball Ground

August 13, 2008; 14:00	Geor - Gia (GEO)	2–0	Fernandes - Morais (ANG)	Beach Volleyball Ground
August 13, 2008; 14:00	(21–14, 21–13)			Beach Volleyball Ground

August 13, 2008; 21:00	Ricardo-Emanuel (BRA)	2–0	Schacht - Slack (AUS)	Beach Volleyball Ground
August 13, 2008; 21:00	(21–14, 21–17)			Beach Volleyball Ground

=== Pool D ===
Rk	Team	Points	Won	Lost	PW	PL	SW	SL
1	Doppler - Gartmayer (AUT)	6	3	0	156	144	6	2
2	M. Araújo - Fabio Luiz (BRA)	5	2	1	139	131	5	2
3	Barsouk - Kolodinsky (RUS)	4	1	2	132	130	3	4
4	Lione - Amore (ITA)	3	0	3	107	129	0	6

August 10, 2008; 13:00	M. Araújo - Fabio Luiz (BRA)	2–0	Lione - Amore (ITA)	Beach Volleyball Ground
August 10, 2008; 13:00	(21–18, 21–18)			Beach Volleyball Ground

August 10, 2008; 23:00	Barsouk - Kolodinsky (RUS)	1–2	Doppler - Gartmayer (AUT)	Beach Volleyball Ground
August 10, 2008; 23:00	(16–21, 21–18, 14–16)			Beach Volleyball Ground

August 12, 2008; 13:00	M. Araújo - Fabio Luiz (BRA)	1–2	Doppler - Gartmayer (AUT)	Beach Volleyball Ground
August 12, 2008; 13:00	(22–20, 19–21, 11–15)			Beach Volleyball Ground

August 12, 2008; 21:00	Barsouk - Kolodinsky (RUS)	2–0	Lione - Amore (ITA)	Beach Volleyball Ground
August 12, 2008; 21:00	(21–17, 21–13)			Beach Volleyball Ground

August 14, 2008; 15:00	Doppler - Gartmayer (AUT)	2–0	Lione - Amore (ITA)	Beach Volleyball Ground
August 14, 2008; 15:00	(21–19, 24–22)			Beach Volleyball Ground

August 14, 2008; 18:00	M. Araújo - Fabio Luiz (BRA)	2–0	Barsouk - Kolodinsky (RUS)	Beach Volleyball Ground
August 14, 2008; 18:00	(24–22, 21–17)			Beach Volleyball Ground

=== Pool E ===
Rk	Team	Points	Won	Lost	PW	PL	SW	SL
1	Nummerdor - Schuil (NED)	6	3	0	133	106	6	1
2	Laciga M. - Schnider (SUI)	5	2	1	113	102	4	2
3	Klemperer - Koreng (GER)	4	1	2	118	132	2	5
4	Kjemperud - Skarlund (NOR)	3	0	3	123	147	2	6

August 9, 2008; 10:00	Nummerdor - Schuil (NED)	2–0	Laciga M. - Schnider (SUI)	Beach Volleyball Ground
August 9, 2008; 10:00	(21–14, 21–15)			Beach Volleyball Ground

August 9, 2008; 23:00	Klemperer - Koreng (GER)	2–1	Kjemperud - Skarlund (NOR)	Beach Volleyball Ground
August 9, 2008; 23:00	(19–21, 22–20, 15–7)			Beach Volleyball Ground

August 11, 2008; 21:00	Nummerdor - Schuil (NED)	2–1	Kjemperud - Skarlund (NOR)	Beach Volleyball Ground
August 11, 2008; 21:00	(13–21, 21–15, 15–9)			Beach Volleyball Ground

August 11, 2008; 23:00	Klemperer - Koreng (GER)	0–2	Laciga M. - Schnider (SUI)	Beach Volleyball Ground
August 11, 2008; 23:00	(15–21, 15–21)			Beach Volleyball Ground

August 13, 2008; 19:00	Kjemperud - Skarlund (NOR)	0–2	Laciga M. - Schnider (SUI)	Beach Volleyball Ground
August 13, 2008; 19:00	(17–21, 13–21)			Beach Volleyball Ground

August 13, 2008; 20:00	Nummerdor - Schuil (NED)	2–0	Klemperer - Koreng (GER)	Beach Volleyball Ground
August 13, 2008; 20:00	(21–16, 21–16)			Beach Volleyball Ground

=== Pool F ===
Rk	Team	Points	Won	Lost	PW	PL	SW	SL
1	Gibb - Rosenthal (USA)	6	3	0	142	111	6	1
2	Asahi - Shiratori (JPN)	4	1	2	147	151	3	5
3	Boersma E. - Ronnes (NED)	4	1	2	125	137	3	4
4	Brink - Dieckmann Ch. (GER)	4	1	2	106	121	2	4

August 10, 2008; 20:00	Brink - Dieckmann Ch. (GER)	2–0	Asahi - Shiratori (JPN)	Beach Volleyball Ground
August 10, 2008; 20:00	(21–18, 21–18)			Beach Volleyball Ground

August 10, 2008; 21:00	Gibb - Rosenthal (USA)	2–0	Boersma E. - Ronnes (NED)	Beach Volleyball Ground
August 10, 2008; 21:00	(21–16, 21–15)			Beach Volleyball Ground

August 12, 2008; 18:00	Boersma E. - Ronnes (NED)	1–2	Asahi - Shiratori (JPN)	Beach Volleyball Ground
August 12, 2008; 18:00	(15–21, 25–23, 11–15)			Beach Volleyball Ground

August 12, 2008; 22:00	Brink - Dieckmann Ch. (GER)	0–2	Gibb - Rosenthal (USA)	Beach Volleyball Ground
August 12, 2008; 22:00	(15–21, 13–21)			Beach Volleyball Ground

August 14, 2008; 19:00	Gibb - Rosenthal (USA)	2–1	Asahi - Shiratori (JPN)	Beach Volleyball Ground
August 14, 2008; 19:00	(21–15, 19–21, 18–16)			Beach Volleyball Ground

August 14, 2008; 20:00	Brink - Dieckmann Ch. (GER)	0–2	Boersma E. - Ronnes (NED)	Beach Volleyball Ground
August 14, 2008; 20:00	(16–21, 20–22)			Beach Volleyball Ground

=== Lucky loser ===
Directly advance to Round of 16
Third place/Lucky Loser playoffs
Eliminated

Of the 6 teams that are placed third in their pools, two are directly qualified to the playoffs. Of the four remaining third placed teams, another two teams get to the playoffs through winning a Lucky Loser match.

3rd placed teams This table shows the results of the third placed teams after the pool play, and before the Lucky Loser matches.

Rk	Team	Points	Won	Lost	PW	PL	Ratio	SW	SL
1	Geor - Gia (GEO)	4	1	2	114	111	1.027	2	4
2	Barsouk - Kolodinsky (RUS)	4	1	2	132	130	1.015	3	4
3	Heyer - Heuscher (SUI)	4	1	2	120	129	0.930	3	4
4	Boersma E. - Ronnes (NED)	4	1	2	125	137	0.912	3	4
5	Klemperer - Koreng (GER)	4	1	2	118	132	0.894	2	5
6	Gosch - Horst (AUT)	4	1	2	111	133	0.835	2	5

Lucky Loser Results of the Lucky Loser matches only.

Rk	Team	Points	Won	Lost	PW	PL	SW	SL
1	Gosch - Horst (AUT)	2	1	0	42	30	2	0
2	Heyer - Heuscher (SUI)	1	0	1	30	42	0	2

Rk	Team	Points	Won	Lost	PW	PL	SW	SL
1	Klemperer - Koreng (GER)	2	1	0	48	41	2	0
2	Boersma E. - Ronnes (NED)	1	0	1	41	48	0	2

August 14, 2008; 22:00	Heyer - Heuscher (SUI)	0–2	Gosch - Horst (AUT)	Beach Volleyball Ground - Court 2
August 14, 2008; 22:00	(11–21, 19–21)			Beach Volleyball Ground - Court 2

August 14, 2008; 22:00	Boersma E. - Ronnes (NED)	0–2	Klemperer - Koreng (GER)	Beach Volleyball Ground - Court 2
August 14, 2008; 22:00	(16–21, 25–27)			Beach Volleyball Ground - Court 2

== Playoffs ==
=== Round of 16 ===
August 16, 2008; 09:00	Laciga M. - Schnider (SUI)	1–2	Rogers - Dalhausser (USA)	Beach Volleyball Ground
August 16, 2008; 09:00	(16–21, 23–21, 13–15)			Beach Volleyball Ground

August 16, 2008; 10:00	Xu - Wu (CHN)	0–2	Klemperer - Koreng (GER)	Beach Volleyball Ground
August 16, 2008; 10:00	(15–21, 18–21)			Beach Volleyball Ground

August 16, 2008; 11:00	Geor - Gia (GEO)	2–1	Doppler - Gartmayer (AUT)	Beach Volleyball Ground
August 16, 2008; 11:00	(19–21, 21–16, 15–13)			Beach Volleyball Ground

August 16, 2008; 12:00	Nummerdor - Schuil (NED)	2–0	Schacht - Slack (AUS)	Beach Volleyball Ground
August 16, 2008; 12:00	(21–16, 21–14)			Beach Volleyball Ground

August 16, 2008; 18:00	Asahi - Shiratori (JPN)	0–2	M. Araújo - Fabio Luiz (BRA)	Beach Volleyball Ground
August 16, 2008; 18:00	(21–23, 15–21)			Beach Volleyball Ground

August 16, 2008; 19:00	Gosch - Horst (AUT)	2–0	Samoilovs - Pļaviņš (LAT)	Beach Volleyball Ground
August 16, 2008; 19:00	(21–17, 21–18)			Beach Volleyball Ground

August 16, 2008; 20:00	Herrera - Mesa (ESP)	0–2	Gibb - Rosenthal (USA)	Beach Volleyball Ground
August 16, 2008; 20:00	(24–26, 17–21)			Beach Volleyball Ground

August 16, 2008; 21:00	Ricardo-Emanuel (BRA)	2–1	Barsouk - Kolodinsky (RUS)	Beach Volleyball Ground
August 16, 2008; 21:00	(18–21, 25–23, 15–13)			Beach Volleyball Ground

=== Overview ===
Quarterfinals
8	Klemperer - Koreng (GER)	13	23
2	Rogers - Dalhausser (USA)	21	25
5	Nummerdor - Schuil (NED)	19	19
17	Geor - Gia (GEO)	21	21
3	Ricardo - Emanuel (BRA)	21	21
9	Gibb - Rosenthal (USA)	18	16
4	M. Araújo - Fabio Luiz (BRA)	22	21
19	Gosch - Horst (AUT)	20	17

Semifinals
2	Rogers - Dalhausser (USA)	21	21
17	Geor - Gia (GEO)	11	13
3	Ricardo - Emanuel (BRA)	20	18
4	M. Araújo - Fabio Luiz (BRA)	22	21

Gold medal game
2	Rogers - Dalhausser (USA)	23	17	15
4	M. Araújo - Fabio Luiz (BRA)	21	21	4
Bronze medal game
17	Geor - Gia (GEO)	15	10
3	Ricardo - Emanuel (BRA)	21	21

=== Quarterfinals ===
August 18, 2008; 10:00	Klemperer - Koreng (GER)	0–2	Rogers - Dalhausser (USA)	Beach Volleyball Ground
August 18, 2008; 10:00	(13–21, 23–25)			Beach Volleyball Ground

August 18, 2008; 11:00	Nummerdor - Schuil (NED)	0–2	Geor - Gia (GEO)	Beach Volleyball Ground
August 18, 2008; 11:00	(19–21, 19–21)			Beach Volleyball Ground

August 18, 2008; 20:00	M. Araújo - Fabio Luiz (BRA)	2–0	Gosch - Horst (AUT)	Beach Volleyball Ground
August 18, 2008; 20:00	(22–20, 21–17)			Beach Volleyball Ground

August 18, 2008; 21:00	Ricardo - Emanuel (BRA)	2–0	Gibb - Rosenthal (USA)	Beach Volleyball Ground
August 18, 2008; 21:00	(21–18, 21–16)			Beach Volleyball Ground

=== Semifinals ===
August 20, 2008; 09:00	Geor - Gia (GEO)	0–2	Rogers - Dalhausser (USA)	Beach Volleyball Ground
August 20, 2008; 09:00	(11–21, 13–21)			Beach Volleyball Ground

August 20, 2008; 10:00	M. Araújo - Fabio Luiz (BRA)	2–0	Ricardo - Emanuel (BRA)	Beach Volleyball Ground
August 20, 2008; 10:00	(22–20, 21–18)			Beach Volleyball Ground

=== Bronze medal match ===
August 22, 2008; 09:00	Geor - Gia (GEO)	0–2	Ricardo - Emanuel (BRA)	Beach Volleyball Ground
August 22, 2008; 09:00	(15–21, 10–21)			Beach Volleyball Ground

=== Gold medal match ===
August 22, 2008; 11:00	Rogers - Dalhausser (USA)	2–1	M. Araújo - Fabio Luiz (BRA)	Beach Volleyball Ground
August 22, 2008; 11:00	(23–21, 17–21, 15–4)			Beach Volleyball Ground

=== Award ceremony ===
- 12:10, Aug 22, 2008

== Final ranking ==
If the host nation has a team in the top 6 teams on the FIVB Olympic ranking when the Olympic Games begin, it is automatically seeded as #1. Therefore, China's team Xu - Wu (ranked as #5 on the FIVB Olympic ranking,) was seeded as #1 before the Games.

Rank	Team	Seed
1st place, gold medalist(s)	Rogers - Dalhausser (USA)	2
2nd place, silver medalist(s)	M. Araújo - Fabio Luiz (BRA)	4
3rd place, bronze medalist(s)	Ricardo - Emanuel (BRA)	3
4.	Geor - Gia (GEO)	17
5.	Nummerdor - Schuil (NED)	5
5.	Klemperer - Koreng (GER)	8
5.	Gibb - Rosenthal (USA)	9
5.	Gosch - Horst (AUT)	19
9.	Xu - Wu (CHN)	1
9.	Barsouk - Kolodinsky (RUS)	7
9.	Schacht - Slack (AUS)	10
9.	Herrera - Mesa (ESP)	11
9.	Doppler - Gartmayer (AUT)	15
9.	Laciga M. - Schnider (SUI)	20
9.	Samoilovs - Pļaviņš (LAT)	21
9.	Asahi - Shiratori (JPN)	22
17.	Heyer - Heuscher (SUI)	12
17.	Boersma E. - Ronnes (NED)	16
19.	Brink - Dieckmann Ch. (GER)	6
19.	Conde - Baracetti (ARG)	13
19.	Kais Kr. - Vesik (EST)	14
19.	Kjemperud - Skarlund (NOR)	18
19.	Lione - Amore (ITA)	23
19.	Fernandes - Morais (ANG)	24

== See also ==
- Beach volleyball at the 2008 Summer Olympics – Women's tournament
