= 2009 Beach Volleyball World Championships – Men's tournament =

Tournament details
- Host country: Norway
- City: Stavanger
- Dates: 26 June – 5 July
- Teams: 48 (from 5 confederations)

Final positions
- Champions: Germany; Julius Brink; Jonas Reckermann (1st title)
- Runners-up: Brazil; Harley Marques Silva; Alison Cerutti
- Third place: United States; Todd Rogers; Phil Dalhausser
- Fourth place: Germany; David Klemperer; Eric Koreng

The men's tournament was held from June 26 to July 5, 2009, in Stavanger, Norway.

== Preliminary round ==
Qualified for the Round of 32 as pool winners or runners-up
Qualified for the Round of 32 as one of the best four third-placed teams
Qualified for the Lucky Losers Playoffs
Eliminated

=== Pool A ===
Pos	Team	Pld	W	L	Pts	SW	SL	SR	SPW	SPL	SPR	Qualification
1	(Brazil) Harley – Alison	3	3	0	6	6	0	MAX	126	70	1.800	Round of 32
2	(Austria) Gosch – Horst	3	2	1	5	4	2	2.000	109	104	1.048	Round of 32
3	(Germany) Erdmann – Matysik	3	1	2	4	2	5	0.400	105	137	0.766	
4	(Norway) Hordvik – K Goranson	3	0	3	3	1	6	0.167	110	139	0.791	

=== Pool B ===
Pos	Team	Pld	W	L	Pts	SW	SL	SR	SPW	SPL	SPR	Qualification
1	(United States) Rogers – Dalhausser	3	2	1	5	4	3	1.333	94	62	1.516	Round of 32
2	(United States) Gibb – Rosenthal	3	2	1	5	5	3	1.667	140	125	1.120	Round of 32
3	(New Zealand) Lochhead – Pitman	3	2	1	5	5	2	2.500	93	83	1.120	Round of 32
4	(Angola) Morais – Silva	3	0	3	3	0	6	0.000	69	126	0.548	

=== Pool C ===
Pos	Team	Pld	W	L	Pts	SW	SL	SR	SPW	SPL	SPR	Qualification
1	(Germany) Brink – Reckermann	3	3	0	6	6	0	MAX	84	46	1.826	Round of 32
2	(Netherlands) E Boersma – Paulides	3	1	2	4	2	4	0.500	42	33	1.273	Round of 32
3	(Argentina) Baracetti – Salema	3	1	2	4	2	5	0.400	113	119	0.950	
4	(Ukraine) Babich – Mykhaylov	3	1	2	4	3	4	0.750	77	98	0.786	

=== Pool D ===
Pos	Team	Pld	W	L	Pts	SW	SL	SR	SPW	SPL	SPR	Qualification
1	(Switzerland) Heyer – Heuscher	3	3	0	6	6	0	MAX	128	104	1.231	Round of 32
2	(United States) Lucena – Keenan	3	2	1	5	4	2	2.000	75	71	1.056	Round of 32
3	(Brazil) Cunha – Pedro	3	1	2	4	2	4	0.500	77	71	1.085	Round of 32
4	(Norway) Maaseide – Horrem	3	0	3	3	0	6	0.000	92	126	0.730	

=== Pool E ===
Pos	Team	Pld	W	L	Pts	SW	SL	SR	SPW	SPL	SPR	Qualification
1	(Brazil) Ricardo – Emanuel	3	3	0	6	6	0	MAX	126	92	1.370	Round of 32
2	(Denmark) Hoyer – Soderberg	3	2	1	5	4	3	1.333	123	129	0.953	Round of 32
3	(China) Wu – Yin	3	1	2	4	3	5	0.600	138	143	0.965	Round of 32
4	(Switzerland) Schnider – Sutter	3	0	3	3	1	6	0.167	116	139	0.835	

=== Pool F ===
Pos	Team	Pld	W	L	Pts	SW	SL	SR	SPW	SPL	SPR	Qualification
1	(Germany) Klemperer – Koreng	3	3	0	6	6	0	MAX	127	92	1.380	Round of 32
2	(Spain) Mesa – Lario	3	1	2	4	3	4	0.750	121	115	1.052	Round of 32
3	(Austria) Doppler – Mellitzer	3	1	2	4	2	4	0.500	99	115	0.861	Round of 32
3	(Czech Republic) Biza – Rotrekl	3	1	2	4	2	5	0.400	110	135	0.815	

=== Pool G ===
Pos	Team	Pld	W	L	Pts	SW	SL	SR	SPW	SPL	SPR	Qualification
1	(Germany) Dollinger – Urbatzka	3	3	0	6	6	1	6.000	139	119	1.168	Round of 32
2	(Latvia) Samoilovs – Sorokins	3	2	1	5	4	3	1.333	137	130	1.054	Round of 32
3	(China) Xu – J. L. Li	3	1	2	4	2	5	0.400	140	150	0.933	
4	(Canada) Cadieux – Reader	3	0	3	3	3	6	0.500	159	176	0.903	

=== Pool H ===
Pos	Team	Pld	W	L	Pts	SW	SL	SR	SPW	SPL	SPR	Qualification
1	(United States) Jennings – Fuerbringer	3	2	1	5	4	3	1.333	101	72	1.403	Round of 32
2	(Italy) Varnier – Nicolai	3	2	1	5	5	4	1.250	154	162	0.951	Round of 32
3	(Netherlands) Nummerdor – Schuil	3	2	1	5	5	2	2.500	94	84	1.119	Round of 32
4	(Austria) Huber – Gartmayer	3	0	3	3	1	6	0.167	107	137	0.781	

=== Pool I ===
Pos	Team	Pld	W	L	Pts	SW	SL	SR	SPW	SPL	SPR	Qualification
1	(Estonia) Kr Kais – Vesik	3	2	1	5	4	3	1.333	132	116	1.138	Round of 32
2	(Russia) Kolodinsky – Barsouk	3	2	1	5	5	3	1.667	143	136	1.051	Round of 32
3	(France) Dugrip – Salvetti	3	1	2	4	3	5	0.600	123	147	0.837	Round of 32
4	(Georgia (country)) Geor – Gia	3	1	2	4	3	4	0.750	127	126	1.008	

=== Pool J ===
Pos	Team	Pld	W	L	Pts	SW	SL	SR	SPW	SPL	SPR	Qualification
1	(Spain) Herrera – Gavira	3	3	0	6	6	1	6.000	136	117	1.162	Round of 32
2	(Brazil) Márcio Araújo – Fábio Luiz	3	2	1	5	5	2	2.500	132	115	1.148	Round of 32
3	(Kazakhstan) Kulinich – Dyachenko	3	1	2	4	2	5	0.400	123	144	0.854	
4	(Switzerland) Gabathuler – Wenger	3	0	3	3	1	5	0.200	127	142	0.894	

=== Pool K ===
Pos	Team	Pld	W	L	Pts	SW	SL	SR	SPW	SPL	SPR	Qualification
1	(France) Ces – Cès	3	2	1	5	5	2	2.500	99	88	1.125	Round of 32
2	(Norway) Kjemperud – Høidalen	3	2	1	5	4	2	2.000	86	70	1.229	Round of 32
3	(Venezuela) Mussa – Jackson	3	1	2	4	2	4	0.500	111	116	0.957	Round of 32
3	(Latvia) Plavins – Iecelnieks	3	1	2	4	2	5	0.400	119	141	0.844	

=== Pool L ===
Pos	Team	Pld	W	L	Pts	SW	SL	SR	SPW	SPL	SPR	Qualification
1	(Canada) Van Huizen – Redmann	3	3	0	6	6	1	6.000	140	116	1.207	Round of 32
2	(Brazil) Bruno – Maciel	3	2	1	5	5	2	2.500	135	116	1.164	Round of 32
3	(Norway) Skarlund – Spinnangr	3	1	2	4	2	4	0.500	102	120	0.850	Round of 32
4	(Netherlands) Hoiskamp – Ronnes	3	0	3	3	0	6	0.000	101	126	0.802	

=== Best Third Places ===
Pos	Grp	Team	Pld	W	L	Pts	SW	SL	SR	SPW	SPL	SPR	Qualification
1	B	(New Zealand) Lochhead – Pitman	3	2	1	5	5	2	2.500	93	83	1.120	Round of 32
2	H	(Netherlands) Nummerdor – Schuil	3	2	1	5	5	2	2.500	94	84	1.119	Round of 32
3	E	(China) Wu – Yin	3	1	2	4	3	5	0.600	138	143	0.965	Round of 32
4	I	(France) Dugrip – Salvetti	3	1	2	4	3	5	0.600	123	147	0.837	Round of 32
5	D	(Brazil) Cunha – Pedro	3	1	2	4	2	4	0.500	77	71	1.085	Round of 32
6	K	(Venezuela) Mussa – Jackson	3	1	2	4	2	4	0.500	111	116	0.957	Round of 32
7	F	(Austria) Doppler – Mellitzer	3	1	2	4	2	4	0.500	99	115	0.861	Round of 32
8	L	(Norway) Skarlund – Spinnangr	3	1	2	4	2	4	0.500	102	120	0.850	Round of 32
9	C	(Argentina) Baracetti – Salema	3	1	2	4	2	5	0.400	113	119	0.950	
10	G	(China) Xu – J. L. Li	3	1	2	4	2	5	0.400	140	150	0.933	
11	J	(Kazakhstan) Kulinich – Dyachenko	3	1	2	4	2	5	0.400	123	144	0.854	
12	A	(Germany) Erdmann – Matysik	3	1	2	4	2	5	0.400	105	137	0.766	

=== Play-off ===
==== Round of 32 ====
Date		Score		Set 1	Set 2	Set 3	Set 4	Set 5	Total
2 July	Mussa – Jackson (Venezuela)	0–2	(United States) Rogers – Dalhausser	9:21	17:21				26:42
2 July	Bruno – Maciel (Brazil)	0–2	(Latvia) Samoilovs – Sorokins	15:21	16:21				31:42
2 July	Herrera – Gavira (Spain)	injury	(Netherlands) E Boersma – Paulides						
2 July	Dollinger – Urbatzka (Germany)	0–2	(New Zealand) Lochhead – Pitman	17:21	21:23				38:44
2 July	Ricardo – Emanuel (Brazil)	2–0	(Netherlands) Nummerdor – Schuil	21:18	21:15				42:33
2 July	Ces – Cès (France)	2–0	(Spain) Mesa – Lario	25:23	21:18				46:41
2 July	Lucena – Keenan (United States)	0–2	(United States) Gibb – Rosenthal	16:21	14:21				30:42
2 July	Brink – Reckermann (Germany)	forfeit	(Brazil) Cunha – Pedro						
2 July	Skarlund – Spinnangr (Norway)	0–2	(Switzerland) Heyer – Heuscher	19:21	14:21				33:42
2 July	Márcio Araújo – Fábio Luiz (Brazil)	2–0	(Russia) Kolodinsky – Barsouk	21:16	21:14				42:30
2 July	Kr Kais – Vesik (Estonia)	2–0	(Denmark) Hoyer – Soderberg	21:18	21:18				42:36
2 July	Klemperer – Koreng (Germany)	2–0	(France) Dugrip – Salvetti	21:18	21:12				42:30
2 July	Jennings – Fuerbringer (United States)	2–0	(China) Wu – Yin	21:12	21:18				42:30
2 July	Van Huizen – Redmann (Canada)	2–0	(Italy) Varnier – Nicolai	21:17	21:19				42:36
2 July	Kjemperud – Høidalen (Norway)	1–2	(Austria) Gosch – Horst	19:21	21:16	11:15			51:52
2 July	Harley – Alison (Brazil)	2–0	(Austria) Doppler – Mellitzer	21:18	21:14				42:32

==== Round of 16 ====
Date		Score		Set 1	Set 2	Set 3	Set 4	Set 5	Total
3 July	Samoilovs – Sorokins (Latvia)	0–2	(United States) Rogers – Dalhausser	11:21	11:21				22:42
3 July	Lochhead – Pitman (New Zealand)	0–2	(Spain) Herrera – Gavira	11:21	12:21				23:42
3 July	Ces – Cès (France)	0–2	(Brazil) Ricardo – Emanuel	24:26	13:21				37:47
3 July	Brink – Reckermann (Germany)	2–0	(United States) Gibb – Rosenthal	21:18	21:16				42:34
3 July	Márcio Araújo – Fábio Luiz (Brazil)	2–0	(Switzerland) Heyer – Heuscher	21:18	24:22				45:40
3 July	Klemperer – Koreng (Germany)	2–0	(Estonia) Kr Kais – Vesik	21:12	21:18				42:30
3 July	Van Huizen – Redmann (Canada)	0–2	(United States) Jennings – Fuerbringer	10:21	13:21				23:42
3 July	Harley – Alison (Brazil)	2–0	(Austria) Gosch – Horst	21:17	21:12				42:29

==== Quarterfinals ====
Date		Score		Set 1	Set 2	Set 3	Set 4	Set 5	Total
4 July	Herrera – Gavira (Spain)	0–2	(United States) Rogers – Dalhausser	23:25	14:21				37:46
4 July	Brink – Reckermann (Germany)	2–1	(Brazil) Ricardo – Emanuel	14:21	21:15	15:13			50:49
4 July	Klemperer – Koreng (Germany)	2–1	(Brazil) Márcio Araújo – Fábio Luiz	15:21	21:18	17:15			53:54
4 July	Harley – Alison (Brazil)	2–1	(United States) Jennings – Fuerbringer	21:14	35:37	17:15			73:66

==== Semifinals ====
Date		Score		Set 1	Set 2	Set 3	Set 4	Set 5	Total
5 July	Brink – Reckermann (Germany)	2–1	(United States) Rogers – Dalhausser	21:17	16:21	15:10			52:48
5 July	Harley – Alison (Brazil)	2–0	(Germany) Klemperer – Koreng	21:18	21:14				42:32

==== Bronze medal Match ====
Date		Score		Set 1	Set 2	Set 3	Set 4	Set 5	Total
5 July	Klemperer – Koreng (Germany)	0–2	(United States) Rogers – Dalhausser	11:21	16:21				27:42

==== Gold medal Match ====
Date		Score		Set 1	Set 2	Set 3	Set 4	Set 5	Total
5 July	Harley – Alison (Brazil)	0–2	(Germany) Brink – Reckermann	16:21	19:21				35:42

== Final ranking ==
RANK	NAME ATHLETES	SEED
1st place, gold medalist(s)	Julius Brink and Jonas Reckermann (GER)	3
2nd place, silver medalist(s)	Harley Marques Silva and Alison Cerutti (BRA)	1
3rd place, bronze medalist(s)	Todd Rogers and Phil Dalhausser (USA)	2
4.	David Klemperer and Eric Koreng (GER)	6
5.	Ricardo Santos and Emanuel Rego (BRA)	5
5.	Márcio Araújo and Fábio Luiz Magalhães (BRA)	10
5.	Pablo Herrera and Adrián Gavira Collado (ESP)	15
5.	Casey Jennings and Matt Fuerbringer (USA)	17
9.	Andy Ces and Kevin Cès (FRA)	11
9.	Kristjan Kais and Rivo Vesik (EST)	16
9.	Jake Gibb and Sean Rosenthal (USA)	23
9.	Florian Gosch and Alexander Horst (AUT)	24
9.	Jason Lochhead and Kirk Pitman (NZL)	26
9.	Sascha Heyer and Patrick Heuscher (SUI)	28
9.	Aleksandrs Samoilovs and Ruslans Sorokins (LAT)	31
9.	Richard Van Huizen and Christian Redmann (CAN)	37
17.	Pedro Henrique Cunha and Pedro Solberg Salgado (BRA)	4
17.	Reinder Nummerdor and Richard Schuil (NED)	8
17.	Igor Kolodinsky and Dmitri Barsouk (RUS)	9
17.	Bruno Oscar Schmidt and Joao Luis Pianca Maciel (BRA)	12
17.	Tarjei Skarlund and Martin Spinnangr (NOR)	13
17.	Jørre Kjemperud and Vegard Høidalen (NOR)	14
17.	Sebastian Dollinger and Mischa Urbatzka (GER)	18
17.	Wu Penggen and Yin Rui (CHN)	20
17.	Nicholas Lucena and Bradley Keenan (USA)	21
17.	Emiel Boersma and Joppe Paulides (NED)	27
17.	Anders Lund Hoyer and Bo Soderberg (DEN)	29
17.	Raúl Mesa and Inocencio Lario Carrillo (ESP)	30
17.	Matteo Varnier and Paolo Nicolai (ITA)	32
17.	Farid Mussa and Jackson Henriquez (VEN)	35
17.	Fabien Dugrip and Yannick Salvetti (FRA)	40
17.	Clemens Doppler and Matthias Mellitzer (AUT)	43
33.	Xu Linyin and Li Jialu (CHN)	7
33.	Mariano Baracetti and José Luis Salema Abrantes (ARG)	22
33.	Jonathan Erdmann and Kay Matysik (GER)	25
33.	Alexey Kulinich and Alexandr Dyachenko (KAZ)	39
37.	Michal Biza and Pavel Rotrekl (CZE)	19
37.	Geor and Gia (GEO)	33
37.	Philip Gabathuler and David Wenger (SUI)	34
37.	Jorn Hoiskamp and Bram Ronnes (NED)	36
37.	Mārtiņš Pļaviņš and Lauris Iecelnieks (LAT)	38
37.	Alexander Huber and Peter Gartmayer (AUT)	41
37.	Ahren Cadieux and Martin Reader (CAN)	42
37.	Jan Schnider and Andreas Martin Sutter (SUI)	44
37.	Bjørn Maaseide and Iver Andreas Horrem (NOR)	45
37.	Mykola Babich and Sergiy Mykhaylov (UKR)	46
37.	Morais Abreu and Mario Silva (ANG)	47
37.	Oivind Hordvik and Kjell Arne Goranson (NOR)	48
