= 2007 Beach Volleyball World Championships – Men's tournament =

Tournament details
- Host country: Switzerland
- City: Gstaad
- Dates: 24 July – 29 July
- Teams: 48 (from 5 confederations)

Final positions
- Champions: United States; Todd Rogers; Phil Dalhausser (1st title)
- Runners-up: Russia; Dmitri Barsuk; Igor Kolodinsky
- Third place: Australia; Andrew Schacht; Joshua Slack
- Fourth place: Brazil; Emanuel Rego; Ricardo Santos

The men's tournament was held from July 24 to July 29, 2007, in Gstaad, Switzerland.

== Preliminary round ==
Qualified for the Round of 32 as pool winners or runners-up
Qualified for the Round of 32 as one of the best four third-placed teams
Qualified for the Lucky Losers Playoffs
Eliminated

=== Pool N ===
Pos	Team	Pld	W	L	Pts	SW	SL	SR	SPW	SPL	SPR	Qualification
1	(Brazil) Emanuel–Ricardo	3	3	0	6	6	1	6.000	136	105	1.295	Round of 32
2	(Canada) Heese–Cadieux	3	2	1	5	4	3	1.333	131	124	1.056	Round of 32
3	(Spain) Herrera–Mesa	3	1	2	4	4	4	1.000	142	139	1.022	3rd place ranking
4	(South Africa) Augoustides–Flisberg	3	0	3	3	0	6	0.000	85	126	0.675	Eliminated

=== Pool O ===
Pos	Team	Pld	W	L	Pts	SW	SL	SR	SPW	SPL	SPR	Qualification
1	(Brazil) Franco–Cunha	3	3	0	6	6	0	MAX	126	95	1.326	Round of 32
2	(Russia) Arkaev–Kuzmichev	3	2	1	5	4	2	2.000	117	105	1.114	Round of 32
3	(Netherlands) de Gruijter–G. Ronnes	3	1	2	4	2	4	0.500	109	114	0.956	3rd place ranking
4	(Austria) Göttlinger–Strauß	3	0	3	3	0	6	0.000	88	126	0.698	Eliminated

=== Pool P ===
Pos	Team	Pld	W	L	Pts	SW	SL	SR	SPW	SPL	SPR	Qualification
1	(Brazil) Magalhães–Araújo	3	3	0	6	6	1	6.000	140	107	1.308	Round of 32
2	(New Zealand) Lochhead–Pitman	3	2	1	5	4	3	1.333	130	124	1.048	Round of 32
3	(Portugal) Maia–Brenha	3	1	2	4	3	4	0.750	115	128	0.898	3rd place ranking
4	(Japan) Asahi–Shiratori	3	0	3	3	1	6	0.167	112	138	0.812	Eliminated

=== Pool Q ===
Pos	Team	Pld	W	L	Pts	SW	SL	SR	SPW	SPL	SPR	Qualification
1	(United States) Rogers–Dalhausser	3	3	0	6	6	1	6.000	141	105	1.343	Round of 32
2	(Netherlands) Boersma–B. Ronnes	3	1	2	4	4	4	1.000	133	138	0.964	Round of 32
3	(Switzerland) Gabathuler–Wenger	3	1	2	4	2	4	0.500	96	110	0.873	3rd place ranking
4	(Georgia (country)) Geor–Gia	3	1	2	4	2	5	0.400	113	130	0.869	Eliminated

=== Pool R ===
Pos	Team	Pld	W	L	Pts	SW	SL	SR	SPW	SPL	SPR	Qualification
1	(Germany) Brink–Dieckmann	3	3	0	6	6	0	MAX	127	111	1.144	Round of 32
2	(Austria) Doppler–Gartmayer	3	2	1	5	4	3	1.333	132	113	1.168	Round of 32
3	(United States) Scott–Fuerbringer	3	1	2	4	3	4	0.750	131	131	1.000	3rd place ranking
4	(Germany) Huth–Schneider	3	0	3	3	0	6	0.000	91	126	0.722	Eliminated

=== Pool S ===
Pos	Team	Pld	W	L	Pts	SW	SL	SR	SPW	SPL	SPR	Qualification
1	(Russia) Barsouk–Kolodinsky	3	2	1	5	4	3	1.333	136	122	1.115	Round of 32
2	(Estonia) Kais–Vesik	3	2	1	5	5	4	1.250	157	147	1.068	Round of 32
3	(Italy) Lione–Varnier	3	1	2	4	3	5	0.600	127	146	0.870	3rd place ranking
4	(Czech Republic) Bíza–Lébl	3	1	2	4	4	4	1.000	140	145	0.966	Eliminated

=== Pool T ===
Pos	Team	Pld	W	L	Pts	SW	SL	SR	SPW	SPL	SPR	Qualification
1	(Switzerland) Heuscher–Heyer	3	3	0	6	6	1	6.000	143	118	1.212	Round of 32
2	(Austria) Horst–Gosch	3	2	1	5	4	2	2.000	127	121	1.050	Round of 32
3	(Switzerland) Schnider–Gscheidle	3	1	2	4	3	4	0.750	127	130	0.977	3rd place ranking
4	(Canada) Leinemann–Van Huizen	3	0	3	3	0	6	0.000	102	130	0.785	Eliminated

=== Pool U ===
Pos	Team	Pld	W	L	Pts	SW	SL	SR	SPW	SPL	SPR	Qualification
1	(Germany) Klemperer–Koreng	3	3	0	6	6	0	MAX	126	98	1.286	Round of 32
2	(Brazil) Harley–Pedro	3	2	1	5	4	2	2.000	122	102	1.196	Round of 32
3	(Cuba) Álvarez–Munder	3	1	2	4	2	5	0.400	99	118	0.839	3rd place ranking
4	(Portugal) Pedrosa–Rosas	3	0	3	3	1	6	0.167	95	124	0.766	Eliminated

=== Pool V ===
Pos	Team	Pld	W	L	Pts	SW	SL	SR	SPW	SPL	SPR	Qualification
1	(Australia) Schacht–Slack	3	2	1	5	4	2	2.000	122	102	1.196	Round of 32
2	(China) Zhou–Li	3	2	1	5	4	2	2.000	124	115	1.078	Round of 32
3	(China) Xu–Wu	3	2	1	5	4	2	2.000	111	112	0.991	3rd place ranking
4	(France) Deulofeu–Salvetti	3	0	3	3	0	6	0.000	103	131	0.786	Eliminated

=== Pool W ===
Pos	Team	Pld	W	L	Pts	SW	SL	SR	SPW	SPL	SPR	Qualification
1	(United States) Lambert–Metzger	3	3	0	6	6	2	3.000	150	121	1.240	Round of 32
2	(Germany) Reckermann–Urbatzka	3	2	1	5	4	3	1.333	127	131	0.969	Round of 32
3	(Norway) Maaseide–Horrem	3	1	2	4	3	5	0.600	143	150	0.953	3rd place ranking
4	(Latvia) Samoilovs–Pļaviņš	3	0	3	3	3	6	0.500	146	164	0.890	Eliminated

=== Pool X ===
Pos	Team	Pld	W	L	Pts	SW	SL	SR	SPW	SPL	SPR	Qualification
1	(Netherlands) Schuil–Nummerdor	3	3	0	6	6	1	6.000	104	96	1.083	Round of 32
2	(United States) Gibb–Rosenthal	3	2	1	5	4	2	2.000	131	108	1.213	Round of 32
3	(Norway) Høidalen–Gøranson	3	1	2	4	3	4	0.750	81	95	0.853	3rd place ranking
4	(United States) Ring–Wong	3	0	3	3	0	6	0.000	25	42	0.595	Eliminated

=== Pool Y ===
Pos	Team	Pld	W	L	Pts	SW	SL	SR	SPW	SPL	SPR	Qualification
1	(Switzerland) Laciga–Laciga	3	3	0	6	6	0	MAX	126	96	1.313	Round of 32
2	(Argentina) Conde–Baracetti	3	2	1	5	4	3	1.333	125	122	1.025	Round of 32
3	(France) Dugrip–Gagliano	3	1	2	4	3	5	0.600	132	142	0.930	3rd place ranking
4	(Norway) Kjemperud–Skarlund	3	0	3	3	1	6	0.167	116	139	0.835	Eliminated

=== 3rd place ranked teams ===
The eight best third-placed teams advanced to the round of 32.

Pos	Team	Pld	W	L	Pts	SW	SL	SR	SPW	SPL	SPR	Qualification
1	(China) Xu–Wu	3	2	1	5	4	2	2.000	111	112	0.991	Round of 32
2	(Spain) Herrera–Mesa	3	1	2	4	4	4	1.000	142	139	1.022	Round of 32
3	(United States) Scott–Fuerbringer	3	1	2	4	3	4	0.750	131	131	1.000	Round of 32
4	(Switzerland) Schnider–Gscheidle	3	1	2	4	3	4	0.750	127	130	0.977	Round of 32
5	(Portugal) Maia–Brenha	3	1	2	4	3	4	0.750	115	128	0.898	Round of 32
6	(Norway) Høidalen–Gøranson	3	1	2	4	3	4	0.750	81	95	0.853	Round of 32
7	(Norway) Maaseide–Horrem	3	1	2	4	3	5	0.600	143	150	0.953	Round of 32
8	(France) Dugrip–Gagliano	3	1	2	4	3	5	0.600	132	142	0.930	Round of 32
9	(Italy) Lione–Varnier	3	1	2	4	3	5	0.600	127	146	0.870	Eliminated
10	(Netherlands) de Gruijter–G. Ronnes	3	1	2	4	2	4	0.500	109	114	0.956	Eliminated
11	(Switzerland) Gabathuler–Wenger	3	1	2	4	2	4	0.500	96	110	0.873	Eliminated
12	(Cuba) Álvarez–Munder	3	1	2	4	2	5	0.400	99	118	0.839	Eliminated

=== Knockout round ===
==== Round of 32 ====
Date		Score		Set 1	Set 2	Set 3
27 Jul	Høidalen–Gøranson (Norway)	0–2	(Brazil) Emanuel–Ricardo	13–21	17–21	
27 Jul	Arkaev–Kuzmichev (Russia)	0–2	(Austria) Horst–Gosch	16–21	21–23	
27 Jul	Schuil–Nummerdor (Netherlands)	0–2	(Estonia) Kais–Vesik	19–21	11–21	
27 Jul	Heuscher–Heyer (Switzerland)	1–2	(Spain) Herrera–Mesa	22–24	21–19	12–15
27 Jul	Brink–Dieckmann (Germany)	0–2	(China) Xu–Wu	13–21	16–21	
27 Jul	Lambert–Metzger (United States)	0–2	(Argentina) Conde–Baracetti	19–21	19–21	
27 Jul	Harley–Pedro (Brazil)	1–2	(Austria) Doppler–Gartmayer	21–19	20–22	13–15
27 Jul	Rogers–Dalhausser (United States)	2–0	(Portugal) Maia–Brenha	21–18	21–18	
27 Jul	Dugrip–Gagliano (France)	0–2	(Brazil) Magalhães–Araújo	18–21	16–21	
27 Jul	Zhou–Li (China)	2–1	(New Zealand) Lochhead–Pitman	27–25	21–23	15–11
27 Jul	Schacht–Slack (Australia)	2–0	(Germany) Reckermann–Urbatzka	21–18	21–19	
27 Jul	Klemperer–Koreng (Germany)	2–0	(Switzerland) Schnider–Gscheidle	21–14	21–19	
27 Jul	Barsouk–Kolodinsky (Russia)	2–0	(United States) Scott–Fuerbringer	21–17	21–18	
27 Jul	Laciga–Laciga (Switzerland)	0–2	(Netherlands) Boersma–B. Ronnes	18–21	17–21	
27 Jul	Gibb–Rosenthal (United States)	2–1	(Canada) Heese–Cadieux	22–0	16–21	16–14
27 Jul	Franco–Cunha (Brazil)	2–0	(Norway) Maaseide–Horrem	21–9	21–14	

==== Round of 16 ====
Date		Score		Set 1	Set 2	Set 3
28 Jul	Horst–Gosch (Austria)	0–2	(Brazil) Emanuel–Ricardo	16–21	16–21	
28 Jul	Herrera–Mesa (Spain)	0–2	(Estonia) Kais–Vesik	18–21	19–21	
28 Jul	Conde–Baracetti (Argentina)	1–2	(China) Xu–Wu	17–21	21–16	12–15
28 Jul	Rogers–Dalhausser (United States)	2–0	(Austria) Doppler–Gartmayer	21–13	21–15	
28 Jul	Zhou–Li (China)	2–0	(Brazil) Magalhães–Araújo	21–15	21–19	
28 Jul	Klemperer–Koreng (Germany)	1–2	(Australia) Schacht–Slack	23–21	18–21	11–15
28 Jul	Boersma–B. Ronnes (Netherlands)	0–2	(Russia) Barsouk–Kolodinsky	16–21	16–21	
28 Jul	Franco–Cunha (Brazil)	1–2	(United States) Gibb–Rosenthal	21–18	21–23	11–15

==== Quarterfinals ====
Date		Score		Set 1	Set 2	Set 3
28 Jul	Kais–Vesik (Estonia)	0–2	(Brazil) Emanuel–Ricardo	21–23	12–21	
28 Jul	Rogers–Dalhausser (United States)	2–0	(China) Xu–Wu	21–19	22–20	
28 Jul	Schacht–Slack (Australia)	2–0	(China) Zhou–Li	21–19	21–16	
28 Jul	Gibb–Rosenthal (United States)	0–2	(Russia) Barsouk–Kolodinsky	19–21	17–21	

==== Semifinals ====
Date		Score		Set 1	Set 2	Set 3
29 Jul	Rogers–Dalhausser (United States)	2–1	(Brazil) Emanuel–Ricardo	21–16	13–21	19–17
29 Jul	Barsouk–Kolodinsky (Russia)	2–0	(Australia) Schacht–Slack	21–13	21–19	

==== Third place match ====
Date		Score		Set 1	Set 2	Set 3
29 Jul	Schacht–Slack (Australia)	2–0	(Brazil) Emanuel–Ricardo	21–17	21–19	

==== Final ====
Date		Score		Set 1	Set 2	Set 3
29 Jul	Barsouk–Kolodinsky (Russia)	0–2	(United States) Rogers–Dalhausser	16–21	14–21	
