= Beach volleyball at the 2008 Summer Olympics – Women's team rosters =

This article shows all participating team squads at the women's beach volleyball tournament at the 2008 Summer Olympics in Beijing.

== Australia ==
=== Team Cook-Barnett ===
#	Name	Date of birth	Height	Spike	Block
1	Natalie Cook	January 19, 1975 (age 33)	181 cm (5 ft 11 in)	305	300
2	Tamsin Barnett	March 10, 1980 (age 28)	193 cm (6 ft 4 in)	-	-

== Austria ==
=== Team Schwaiger-Schwaiger ===
#	Name	Date of birth	Height	Spike	Block
1	Doris Schwaiger	February 28, 1985 (age 23)	172 cm (5 ft 8 in)	-	-
2	Stefanie Schwaiger	August 7, 1986 (age 21)	182 cm (6 ft 0 in)	-	-

== Belgium ==
=== Team Van Breedam-Mouha ===
#	Name	Date of birth	Height	Spike	Block
1	Liesbet Van Breedam	January 27, 1979 (age 29)	178 cm (5 ft 10 in)	-	-
2	Liesbeth Mouha	January 7, 1983 (age 25)	190 cm (6 ft 3 in)	-	-

== Brazil ==
=== Team Larissa-Ana Paula ===
#	Name	Date of birth	Height	Spike	Block
1	Larissa França	April 14, 1982 (age 26)	174 cm (5 ft 9 in)	-	-
2	Ana Paula Connelly	February 13, 1972 (age 36)	183 cm (6 ft 0 in)	-	-

=== Team Talita-Renata ===
#	Name	Date of birth	Height	Spike	Block
1	Talita Antunes	August 29, 1982 (age 25)	181 cm (5 ft 11 in)	-	-
2	Renata Ribeiro	December 7, 1981 (age 26)	176 cm (5 ft 9 in)	-	-

== China ==
=== Team Tian-Wang ===
#	Name	Date of birth	Height	Spike	Block
1	Tian Jia	February 9, 1981 (age 27)	177 cm (5 ft 10 in)	-	-
2	Wang Jie	December 4, 1985 (age 22)*	190 cm (6 ft 3 in)	-	-

*The FIVB website profile has age 22, the Beach Volleyball Database profile has age 24

=== Team Xue-Zhang ===
#	Name	Date of birth	Height	Spike	Block
1	Xue Chen	February 18, 1989 (age 19)	189 cm (6 ft 2 in)	-	-
2	Zhang Xi	April 19, 1985 (age 23)	183 cm (6 ft 0 in)	-	-

== Cuba ==
=== Team F. Grasset-L. Peraza ===
#	Name	Date of birth	Height	Spike	Block
1	Dalixia Fernandez Grasset	November 26, 1977 (age 30)	177 cm (5 ft 10 in)	335	237
2	Tamara Larrea Peraza	November 25, 1973 (age 34)	183 cm (6 ft 0 in)	-	-

=== Team Esteves Ribalta-M. Crespo ===
#	Name	Date of birth	Height	Spike	Block
1	Imara Esteves Ribalta	April 15, 1978 (age 30)	178 cm (5 ft 10 in)	-	-
2	Milagros Crespo	February 4, 1979 (age 29)	173 cm (5 ft 8 in)	320	226

== Georgia ==
=== Team Saka-Rtvelo ===
#	Name	Date of birth	Height	Spike	Block
1	Cristine "Saka" Santanna	May 27, 1979 (age 29)	181 cm (5 ft 11 in)	-	-
2	Andrezza "Rtvelo" Martins	August 2, 1977 (age 31)	171 cm (5 ft 7 in)	-	-

== Germany ==
=== Team Goller-Ludwig ===
#	Name	Date of birth	Height	Spike	Block
1	Sara Goller	May 21, 1984 (age 24)	189 cm (6 ft 2 in)	-	-
2	Laura Ludwig	January 13, 1986 (age 22)	180 cm (5 ft 11 in)	-	-

=== Team Pohl-Rau ===
#	Name	Date of birth	Height	Spike	Block
1	Stephanie Pohl	May 7, 1978 (age 30)	186 cm (6 ft 1 in)	-	-
2	Okka Rau	January 5, 1977 (age 31)	179 cm (5 ft 10 in)	-	-

== Greece ==
=== Team Karantasiou-Arvaniti ===
#	Name	Date of birth	Height	Spike	Block
1	Vasso Karadassiou	January 6, 1973 (age 35)	182 cm (6 ft 0 in)	305	295
2	Vassiliki Arvaniti	March 17, 1985 (age 23)	178 cm (5 ft 10 in)	-	-

=== Team Koutroumanidou-Tsiartsiani ===
#	Name	Date of birth	Height	Spike	Block
1	Efthalia Koutroumanidou	October 7, 1982 (age 25)	179 cm (5 ft 10 in)	-	-
2	Maria Tsiartsiani	October 21, 1980 (age 27)	180 cm (5 ft 11 in)	-	-

== Japan ==
=== Team Teru Saiki-Kusuhara ===
#	Name	Date of birth	Height	Spike	Block
1	Mika Teru Saiki	September 25, 1971 (age 36)	172 cm (5 ft 8 in)	-	-
2	Chiaki Kusuhara	November 1, 1975 (age 32)	175 cm (5 ft 9 in)	-	-

== Mexico ==
=== Team Candelas-García ===
#	Name	Date of birth	Height	Spike	Block
1	Bibiana Candelas	December 2, 1983 (age 24)	196 cm (6 ft 5 in)	-	-
2	Mayra García	May 16, 1972 (age 36)	173 cm (5 ft 8 in)	285	270

== Netherlands ==
=== Team Kadijk-Mooren ===
#	Name	Date of birth	Height	Spike	Block
1	Rebekka Kadijk	June 16, 1979 (age 29)	175 cm (5 ft 9 in)	-	-
2	Merel Mooren	September 22, 1982 (age 25)	186 cm (6 ft 1 in)	-	-

== Norway ==
=== Team Håkedal-Tørlen ===
#	Name	Date of birth	Height	Spike	Block
1	Nila Håkedal	June 13, 1979 (age 29)	177 cm (5 ft 10 in)	-	-
2	Ingrid Tørlen	July 21, 1979 (age 29)	178 cm (5 ft 10 in)	-	-

=== Team Maaseide-Glesnes ===
#	Name	Date of birth	Height	Spike	Block
1	Kathrine Maaseide	December 18, 1976 (age 31)	182 cm (6 ft 0 in)	-	-
2	Susanne Glesnes	December 1, 1974 (age 33)	179 cm (5 ft 10 in)	-	-

== Russia ==
=== Team Uryadova-Shiryaeva ===
#	Name	Date of birth	Height	Spike	Block
1	Natalya Uryadova	March 15, 1977 (age 31)	180 cm (5 ft 11 in)	-	-
2	Alexandra Shiryaeva	February 9, 1983 (age 25)	185 cm (6 ft 1 in)	-	-

== South Africa ==
=== Team Augoustides-Nel ===
#	Name	Date of birth	Height	Spike	Block
1	Judith Augoustides	April 10, 1975 (age 33)	187 cm (6 ft 2 in)	-	-
2	Vita Nel	December 11, 1975 (age 32)	180 cm (5 ft 11 in)	-	-

== Switzerland ==
=== Team Kuhn-Schwer ===
#	Name	Date of birth	Height	Spike	Block
1	Simone Kuhn	September 2, 1980 (age 27)	183 cm (6 ft 0 in)	305	294
2	Lea Schwer	January 13, 1982 (age 26)	182 cm (6 ft 0 in)	-	-

== United States ==
=== Team Walsh-May-Treanor ===
#	Name	Date of birth	Height	Spike	Block
1	Kerri Walsh	August 15, 1978 (age 30)	190 cm (6 ft 3 in)	-	-
2	Misty May-Treanor	July 30, 1977 (age 31)	182 cm (6 ft 0 in)	-	-

=== Team Branagh-Youngs ===
#	Name	Date of birth	Height	Spike	Block
1	Nicole Branagh	January 31, 1979 (age 29)	187 cm (6 ft 2 in)	-	-
2	Elaine Youngs	February 14, 1970 (age 38)	183 cm (6 ft 0 in)	-	-

== See also ==
- Beach volleyball at the 2008 Summer Olympics – Men's team rosters
