= 2007 Beach Volleyball World Championships =

2007 World Championship
- Location: Gstaad, Switzerland
- Dates: 24 July – 29 July

Champions
- Men: United States; Todd Rogers; Phil Dalhausser
- Women: United States; Kerri Walsh; Misty May-Treanor

The 2007 FIVB Beach Volleyball Swatch World Championships was a beach volleyball event, that is held from July 24 to 29, 2007 in Gstaad, Switzerland. The Swatch FIVB World Championships are organized every two years, and Switzerland hosted the event for the first time. 48 teams per gender entered the competition making 96 total.

== Medal summary ==
Event	Gold	Silver	Bronze
Men's event	Todd Rogers and Phil Dalhausser (USA)	Dmitri Barsouk and Igor Kolodinsky (RUS)	Andrew Schacht and Joshua Slack (AUS)
Women's event	Kerri Walsh and Misty May-Treanor (USA)	Tian Jia and Wang Jie (CHN)	Larissa França and Juliana Silva (BRA)

== Medal table ==
Rank	Nation	Gold	Silver	Bronze	Total
1	United States	2	0	0	2
2	China	0	1	0	1
2	Russia	0	1	0	1
4	Australia	0	0	1	1
4	Brazil	0	0	1	1
Totals (5 entries)		2	2	2	6
