= Eugenio Amore =

Italian beach volleyball player

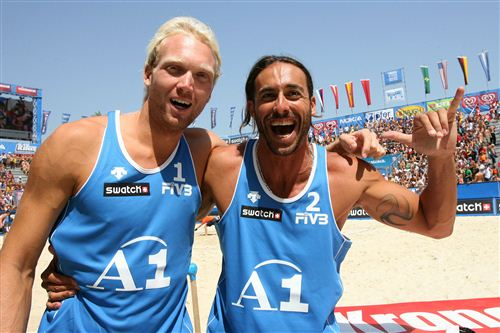
- Amore (right) with Riccardo Bizzotto

Personal information
- Nationality: Italian
- Born: 12 February 1972 (age 54); Vergato, Italy
- Height: 194 cm (6 ft 4 in)

Eugenio Amore (born 12 February 1972, in Vergato) is a former beach volleyball player from Italy.

He and teammate Riccardo Lione represented Italy at the 2008 Summer Olympics in Beijing, China.
