= Mārtiņš Pļaviņš =

Latvian beach volleyball player

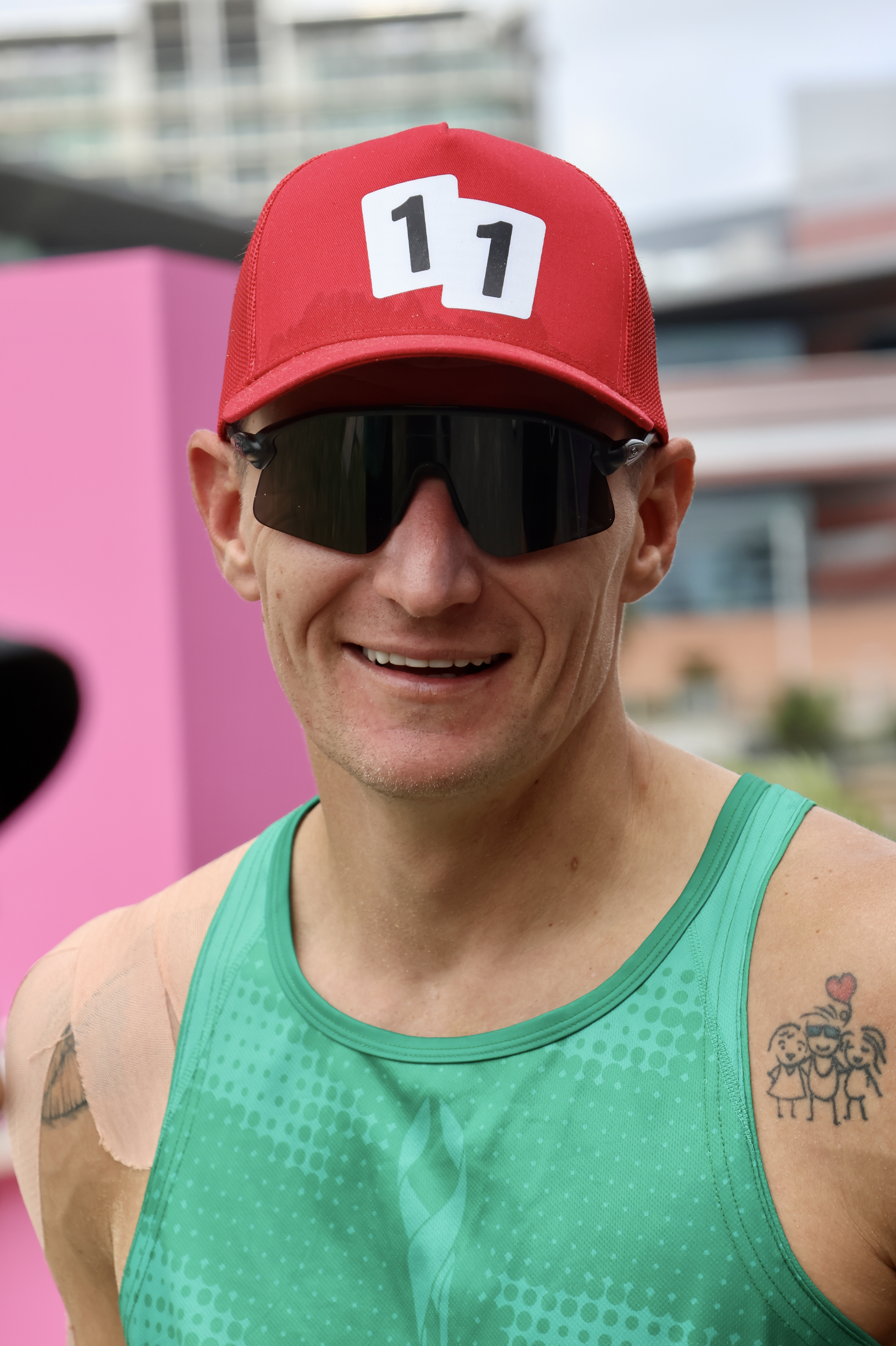
- Pļaviņš at the 2025 Beach Volleyball World Championships

Personal information
- Full name: Mārtiņš Pļaviņš
- Nationality: Latvian
- Born: 8 May 1985 (age 41) Riga, Latvia
- Home town: Riga, Latvia
- Height: 190 cm (6 ft 3 in)
- Weight: 87 kg (192 lb)
Beach volleyball information
Current teammate
Years	Teammate	
–	Edgars Točs	
Previous teammates
Years	Teammate	Tours (points)
2004–2008 2008–2012 2013	Aleksandrs Samoilovs Jānis Šmēdiņš Jānis Pēda Hermans Egleskalns	35 (2210)
Honours
beach volleyball
Representing Latvia
Olympic Games
Bronze medal – third place	2012 London	Men's
European Championships
Gold medal – first place	2024 Netherlands	Men's
Bronze medal – third place	2010 Berlin	Men's
European Games
Gold medal – first place	2015 Baku	Men's

Mārtiņš Pļaviņš (born 8 May 1985) is a Latvian professional beach volleyball player.

He teamed up with Aleksandrs Samoilovs in 2004. Pļaviņš and teammate Samoilovs represented Latvia at the 2008 Summer Olympics in Beijing, China after which they stopped playing together.

At the 2008 Olympics, the #21-ranked Latvian team achieved a major upset in the preliminary round, beating the #1-ranked team of Todd Rogers and Phil Dalhausser (United States). Latvian team won its preliminary round group and in round of 16 lost to Austrian team Florian Gosch and Alexander Horst.

After the 2008 Olympics, he began playing together with Jānis Šmēdiņš. At the 2010 European Beach Volleyball Championships, Pļaviņš and Šmēdiņš won the bronze medal. They followed this up by winning the bronze medal at the 2012 Summer Olympics. They lost to Rego and Cerutti of Brazil in the semi-final but beat Nummerdor and Schuil of the Netherlands in the bronze medal match.

Olympic Games
Preceded by Vadims Vasiļevskis	Flagbearer for Latvia; 2012 London	Succeeded by Māris Štrombergs
Awards
Preceded by Reinder Nummerdor (NED)	Men's FIVB World Tour "Best Defender"; 2012	Succeeded by Bruno Schmidt (BRA)
