= Chaoyang Park Beach Volleyball Ground =

Building in Chaoyang Park, Beijing, China

Coordinates: 39°56′42″N 116°28′44″E

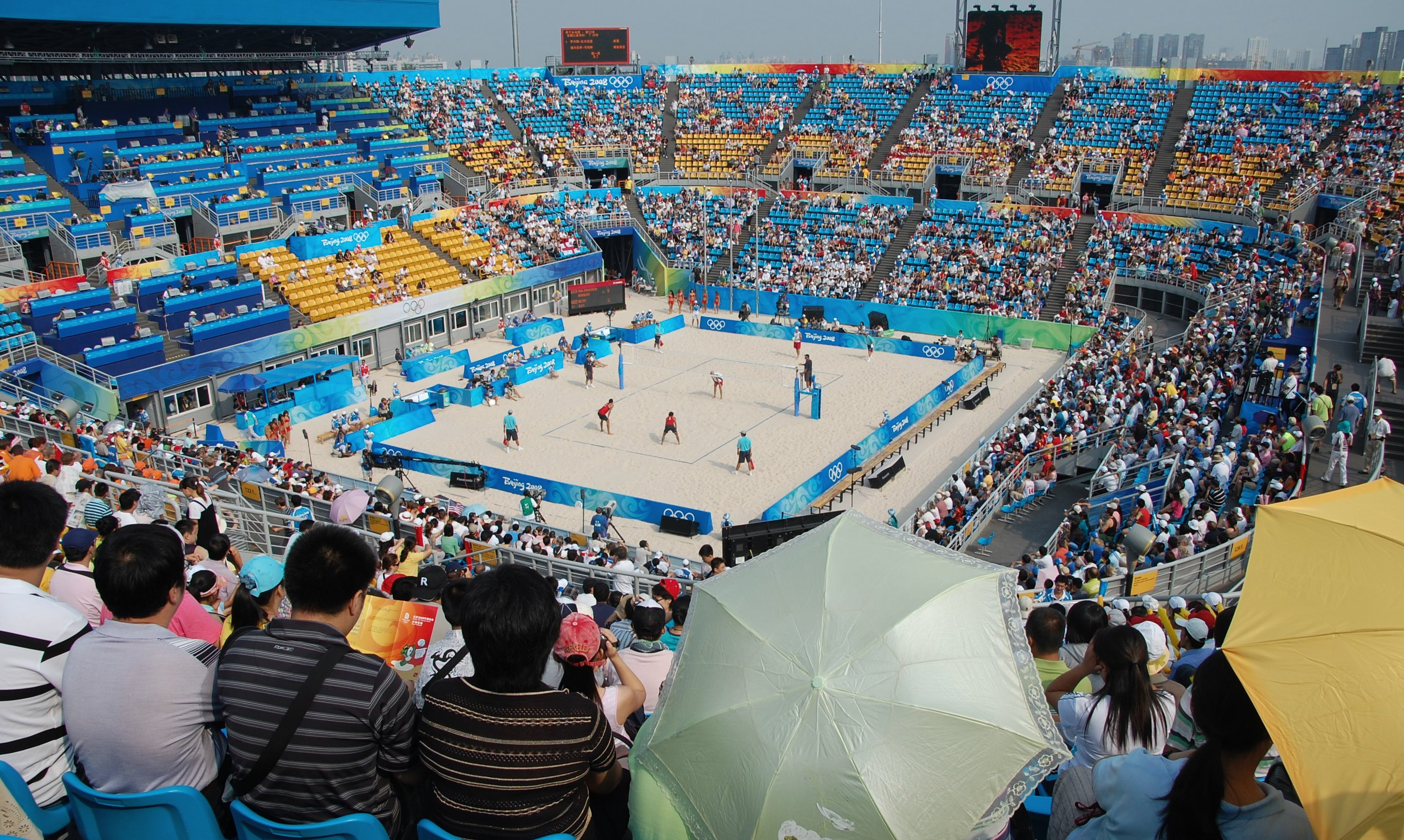
The playing area of the Beach Volleyball Ground

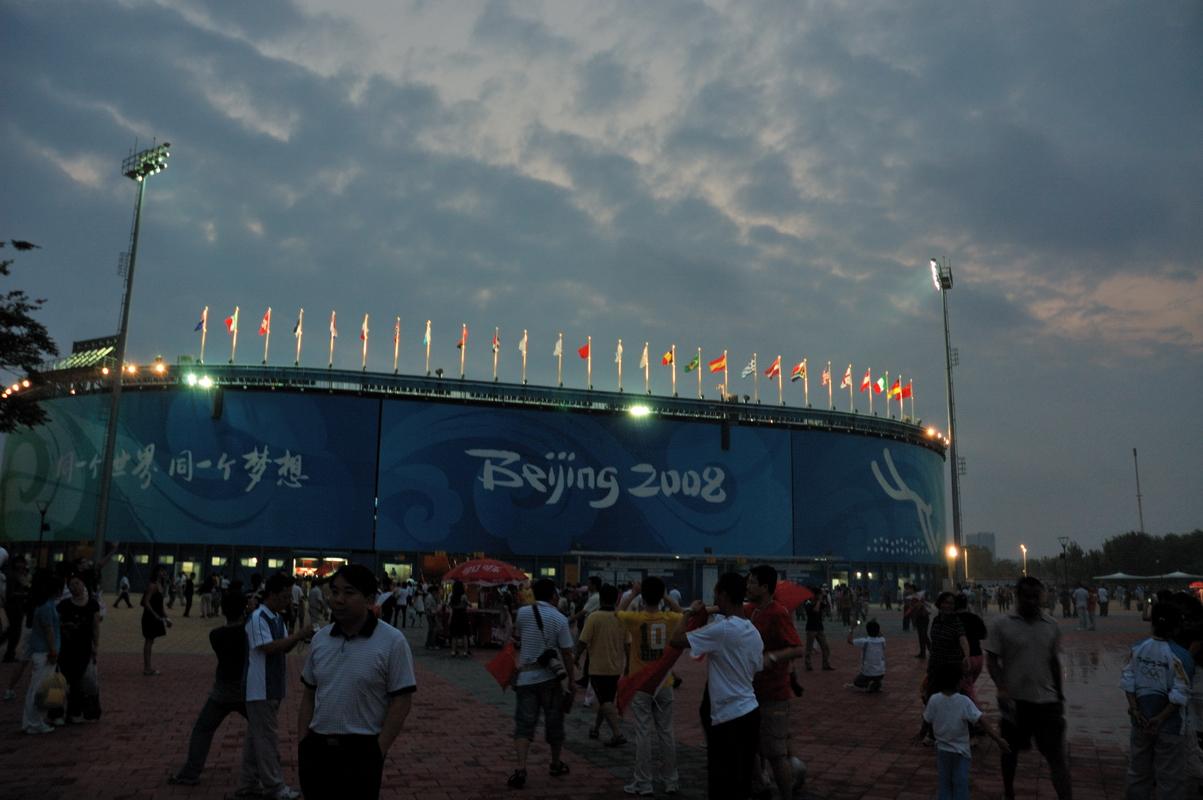
View of the Beach Volleyball Ground

The Chaoyang Park Beach Themed Park (simplified Chinese: 朝阳公园沙滩主题乐园; traditional Chinese: 朝陽公園沙灘主题樂園; pinyin: Cháoyáng Gōngyuán Shātān Zhu3ti2 Le4yuan2), known as the Chaoyang Park Beach Volleyball Ground (simplified Chinese: 朝阳公园沙滩排球场; traditional Chinese: 朝陽公園沙灘排球場; pinyin: Cháoyáng Gōngyuán Shātān Páiqiú Chǎng) during the 2008 Olympic Games, is a swimming, samba, African dance, hula and carnival place in Chaoyang Park that used to be one of 9 temporary venues used for the 2008 Summer Olympics. It was built on the site of the ex-Beijing Gas Appliance Factory (Chinese: 北京煤气用具厂) but now a part of the park. The ground was used for the beach volleyball matches.

The venue had a capacity of 12,000, consisting of 1 competition ground, 2 warmup grounds, and 6 training grounds. Court 2 was used on Day 6 of competition.

After the Olympics, the venue hosted the Beijing Grand Slam of the FIVB Beach Volleyball World Tour in 2011 and 2012. It also hosted the Beijing Ocean-Beach Carnival every summer since 2009.
