= Beach Volleyball Database =

Website providing statistics for beach volleyball

- Website type: online resource
- Available in: English
- Owner: Dennis Wagner ("Dr. Ono")
- Creator: Dennis Wagner ("Dr. Ono")
- Website: www.bvbinfo.com
- Launched: June 2, 1999 (27 years ago)
- Current status: active

The Beach Volleyball Database, also known as BVB Info, is a website that tracks international beach volleyball players, tournaments and history, including results of North American and international tournaments. It is the only website of its kind in the sport of beach volleyball.

Volleyball Magazine calls the website "a reliable source for entries and results." The site also collaborates with the Fédération Internationale de Volleyball (FIVB) to provide tournament notes to the FIVB website.

== History ==
The Beach Volleyball Database was launched online by Dennis Wagner on June 2, 1999. Wagner (nicknamed "Dr. Ono") operates the website on his own, for free.
