= Emanuel Fernandes (beach volleyball) =

Angolan beach volleyball player (born 1967)

Emanuel Fernandes (born July 25, 1967) is a beach volleyball player from Angola.

He and team mate Morais Abreu represented Angola at the 2008 Summer Olympics in Beijing, China.
