= Riccardo Lione =

Italian beach volleyball player

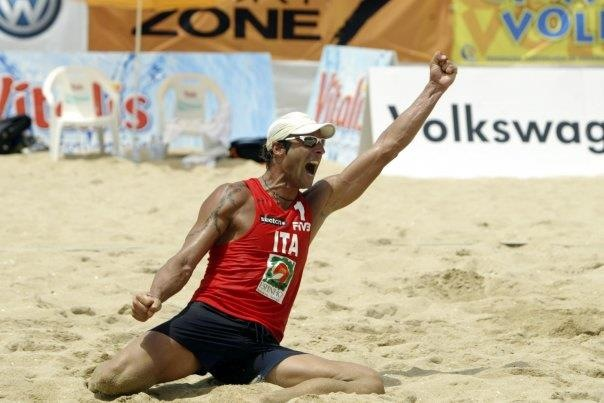

Personal information
- Nationality: Italian
- Born: 13 April 1972 (age 52); Rome, Italy
- Height: 197 cm (6 ft 6 in)

Riccardo Lione (born 13 April 1972 in Rome), is a former beach volleyball player from Italy. He and teammate Eugenio Amore represented Italy at the 2008 Summer Olympics in Beijing, China. They were eliminated in the first round after losing all three matches. He made his debut in the Italian Championships on 25 June 1994. He played 53 Italian Championship tournaments, winning eleven times.
