= Morais Abreu =

Angolan beach volleyball player (born 1968)

Personal information
- Born: July 10, 1968 (age 57)

Sport
- Country: Angola
- Sport: Beach volleyball

Morais Santos Abreu (born July 10, 1968) is a beach volleyball player from Angola.

He and team mate Emanuel Fernandes represented Angola at the 2008 Summer Olympics in Beijing, China.
