= Jan Schnider =

Swiss beach volleyball player (born 1983)

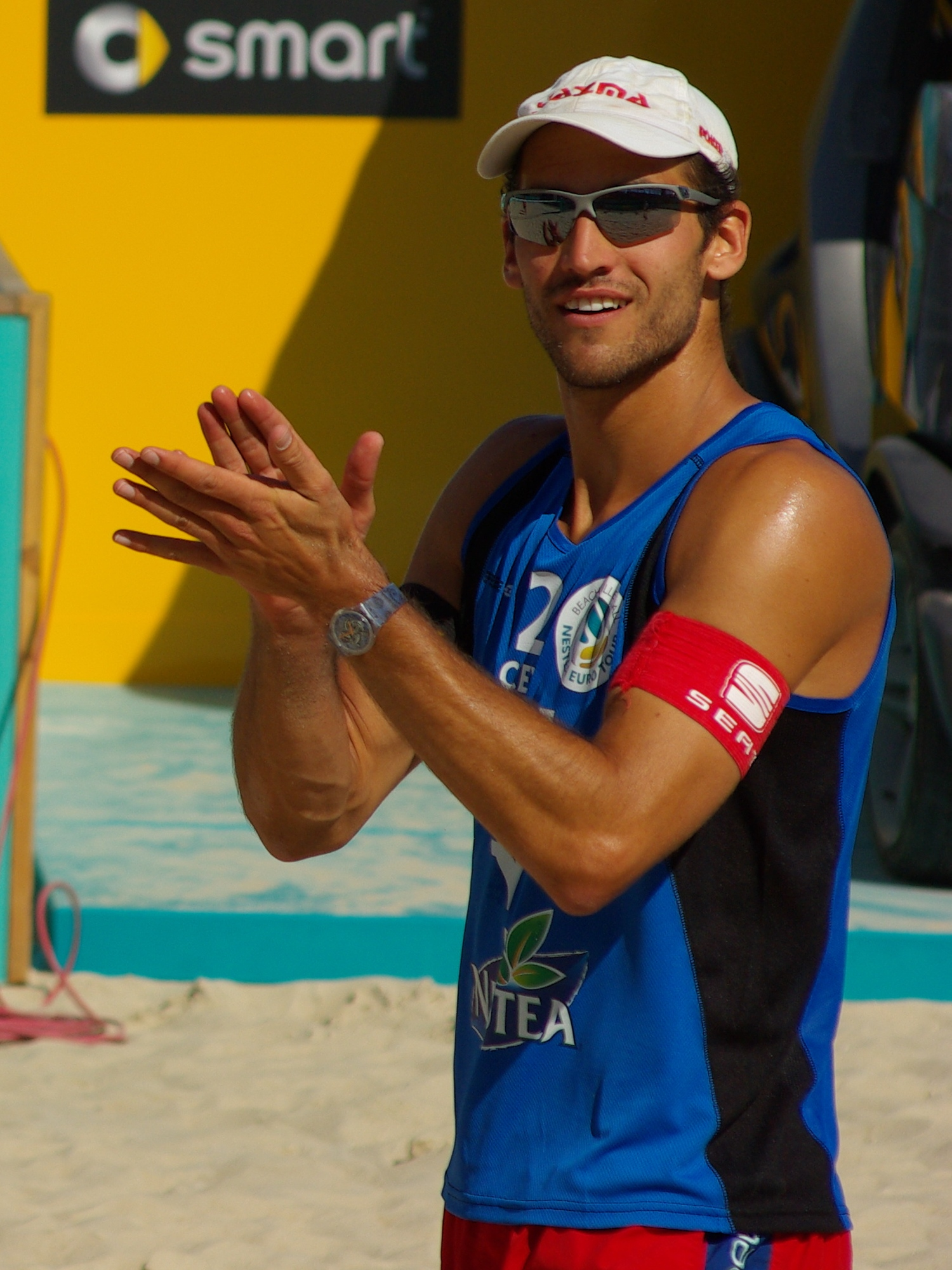

Personal information
- Full name: Jan Schnider
- Born: January 7, 1983 (age 43); Oensingen, Switzerland
- Height: 195 cm (6 ft 5 in)

Beach volleyball information

Current teammate
Teammate
Martin Laciga

Previous teammates
Teammate	Tours (points)
Marcel Gscheidle; Tino Schutz; Michel Kertai	37 (1342); 7 (78); 2 (10)

Jan Schnider (born January 7, 1983, in Oensingen) is a beach volleyball player from Switzerland, who with his team mate Martin Laciga is representing his native country at the 2008 Summer Olympics, in Beijing, China.

== Playing partners ==
- Marcel Gscheidle
- Martin Laciga
- Tino Schutz
- Michel Kertai
- Philip Gabathuler
- Sebastian Beck
- Bernhard Vesti

== Sponsors ==
Swatch
