= Jorge Terceiro =

Brazilian beach volleyball player (born 1976)

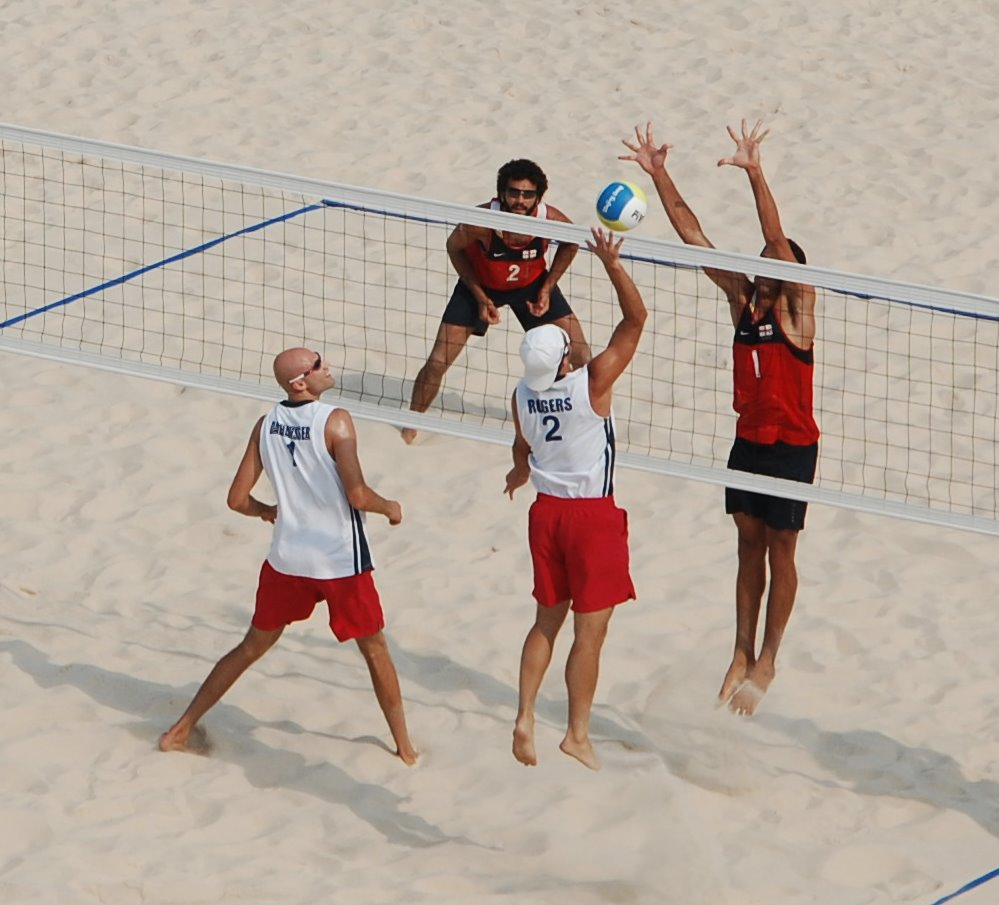
- Jorge Terceiro (red-2) at the Beijing Olympics

Personal information
- Full name: Jorge Terceiro
- Nickname: Gia
- Born: July 19, 1976 (age 50); João Pessoa, Brazil
- Hometown: João Pessoa, Brazil
- Height: 190 cm (6 ft 3 in)

Beach volleyball information

Current teammate
Teammate
Renato Gomes

Previous teammates
Teammate	Tours (points)
Luiz Dulinski	1 (2)

Jorge "Gia" Terceiro (born July 19, 1976) is a Brazilian beach volleyball player representing Georgia.

== Team Geor – Gia ==
Brazilians Jorge "Gia" Terceiro and his teammate Renato "Geor" Gomes represented Georgia at the 2008 Summer Olympics in Beijing, China.
