= Pablo Herrera (beach volleyball) =

Spanish beach volleyball player

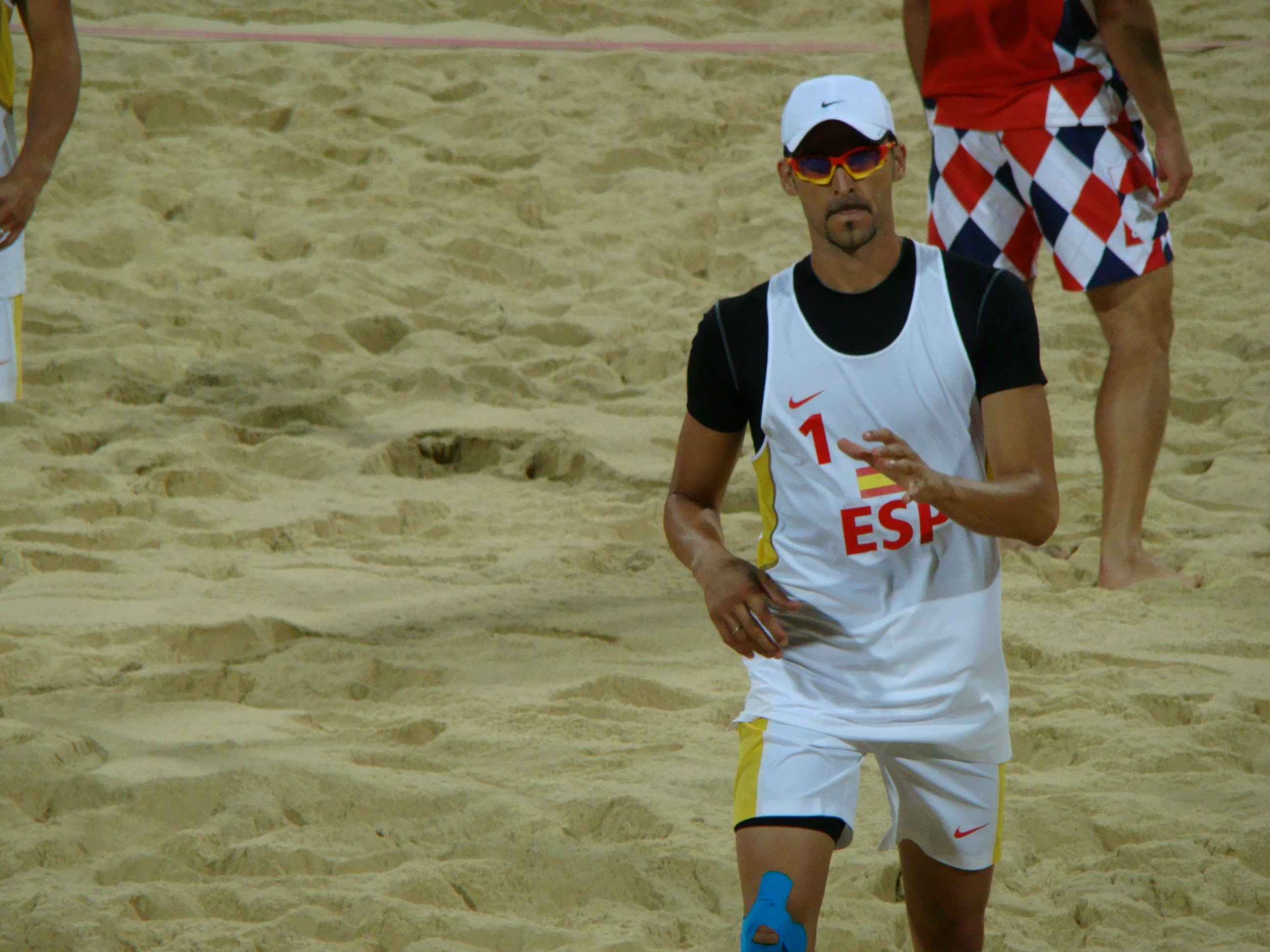
- Herera at the 2012 Olympics.

Personal information
- Full name: Pablo Herrera Allepuz
- Nickname: Pablo Allepuz
- Nationality: Spanish
- Born: 29 June 1982 (age 44); Castelló de la Plana
- Height: 6 ft 4 in (193 cm)
Honours
Men's beach volleyball
Representing Spain
Olympic Games
Silver medal – second place	2004 Athens	Beach
FIVB World Tour
Bronze medal – third place	2013 Berlin	Beach
European Championships
Gold medal – first place	2005 Moscow	Beach
Gold medal – first place	2013 Klagenfurt	Beach

Pablo Herrera Allepuz (Note: In this Spanish name, the first or paternal surname is Herrera and the second or maternal family name is Allepuz.) (born 29 June 1982, in Castellón de la Plana) is a Spanish beach volleyball player who has represented his country five times at the Olympics.

In 2004 in Athens, Herrera and Javier Bosma won the silver medal. In the 2008 Olympic tournament, he teamed up with Raúl Mesa and lost in the round of 16. At the 2012 Summer Olympics tournament, Herrera partnered with Adrián Gavira. The pair lost in the round of 16 to Brazilians Ricardo Santos and Pedro Cunha. At the 2016 Olympics in Rio de Janeiro, Herrera once again played with Gavira, losing to eventual champions from Brazil, Alison Ceruti and Bruno Oscar Schmidt. At the 2020 Olympics in Tokyo, Herrera once again played with Gavira, losing to runner-ups from ROC (Russia), Viacheslav Krasilnikov and Oleg Stoyanovskiy. At the 2024 Olympics in Paris, he played yet again with Gavira, but lost in the quarter-finals to Norway.
