= Peter Gartmayer =

Austrian beach volleyball player (born 1978)

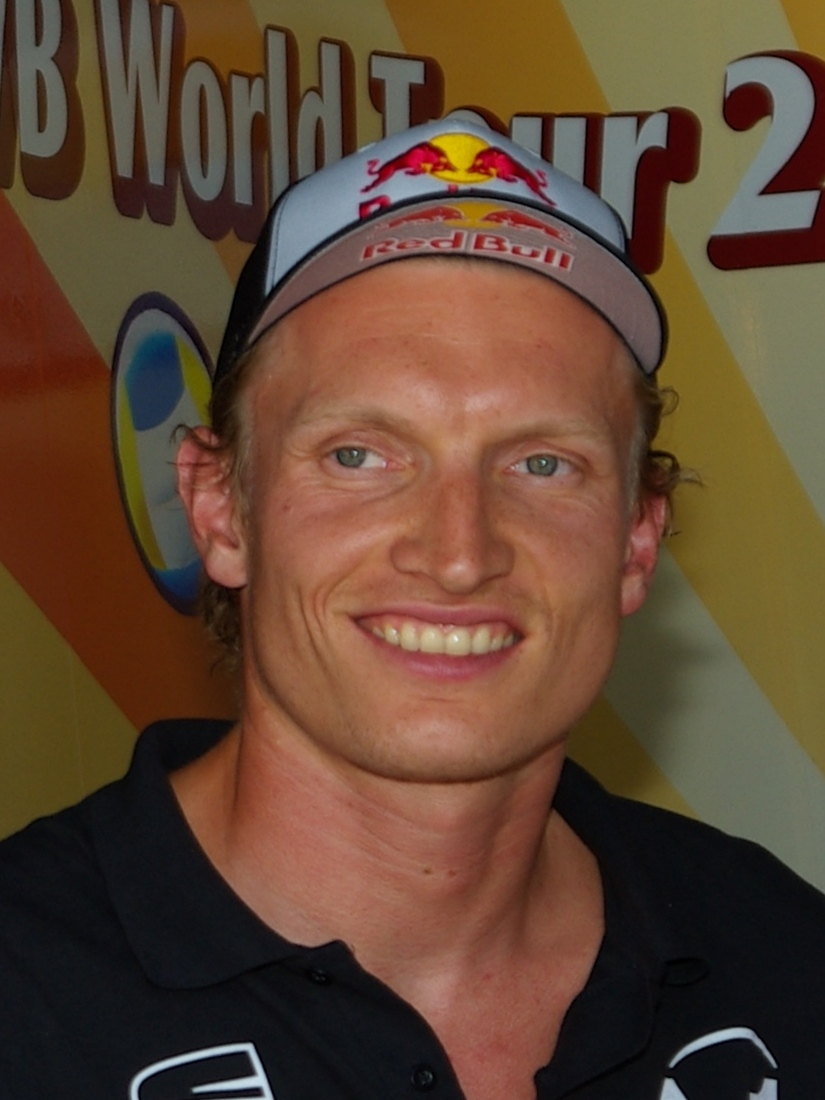
Peter Gartmayer

Peter Gartmayer (born 25 February 1978) is a beach volleyball player from Austria.

He and teammate Robert Nowotny represented Austria at the 2004 Summer Olympics in Athens, Greece. Four years later, he and teammate Clemens Doppler represented Austria at the 2008 Summer Olympics in Beijing, China. Won a gold medal at the 2007 European Beach Volleyball Championship.

In the 2010–11 season, he began his career as an assistant coach of the SVS Schwechat Wien (Austrian national league women).
