= Renato Gomes =

Brazilian beach volleyball player (born 1981)

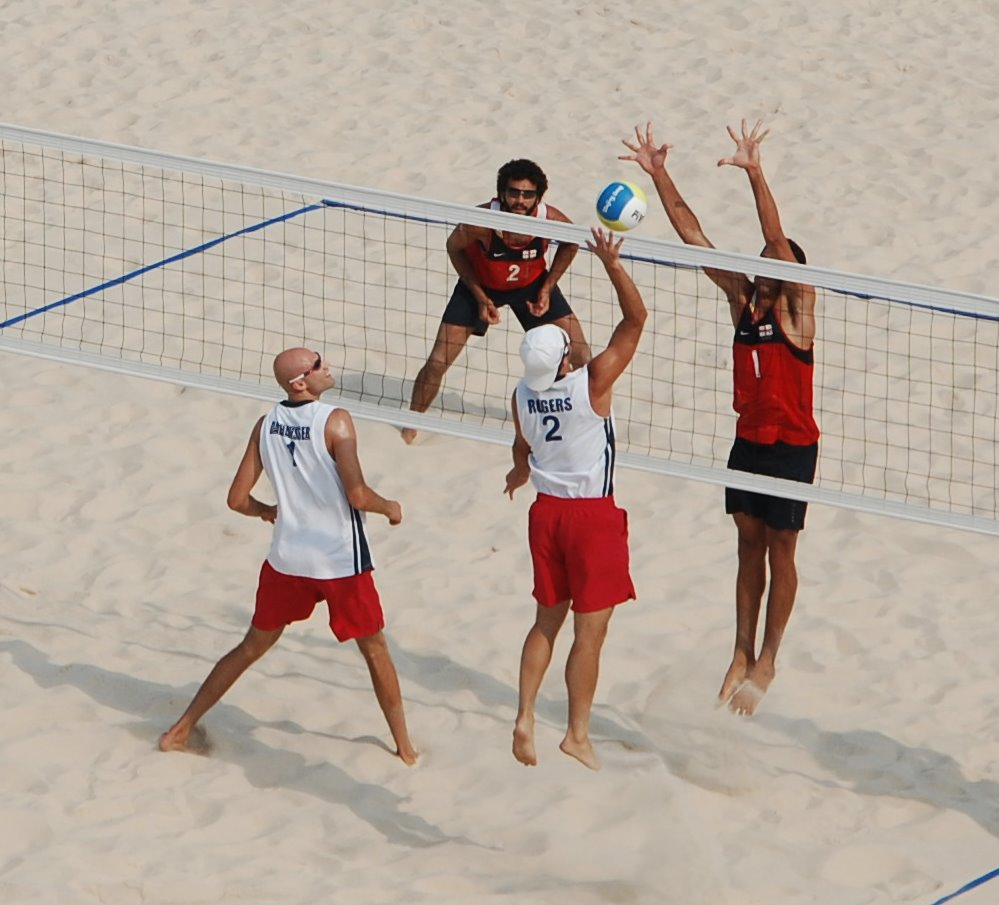
- Renato Gomes (red-1) at the Beijing Olympics

Personal information
- Full name: Renato Gomes
- Nickname: Geor
- Born: January 20, 1981 (age 45); João Pessoa, Brazil
- Hometown: João Pessoa, Brazil
- Height: 202 cm (6 ft 8 in)

Beach volleyball information

Current teammate
Teammate
Jorge "Gia" Terceiro
- Last updated: August 12, 2008

Renato "Geor" Gomes (born January 20, 1981) is a Brazilian beach volleyball player representing Georgia.

== Team Geor – Gia ==
Brazilians Renato "Geor" Gomes and his team mate Jorge "Gia" Terceiro represented Georgia at the 2008 Summer Olympics in Beijing, China.
