= Bram Ronnes =

Dutch beach volleyball player

Bram Ronnes (born 17 November 1978 in Enschede) is a volleyball player from the Netherlands.

Ronnes competes in beach volleyball and forms a team with Emiel Boersma. Together they finished in 9th position at the 2007 World Championships in Gstaad. In a heavy competition with Jochem de Gruijter and Ronnes' brother Gijs they challenged to win a ticket for the 2008 Summer Olympics in Beijing. Both teams achieved the national and international qualification limits, but as only two teams of the same country were able to qualify and the third combination of Reinder Nummerdor and Richard Schuil was not questionable to take the first ticket one of the teams had to be eliminated. Boersma and Ronnes eventually qualified to take part in China.

His father Frans Ronnes is mayor of Haaren.
