= Andrew Schacht =

Australian beach volleyball player

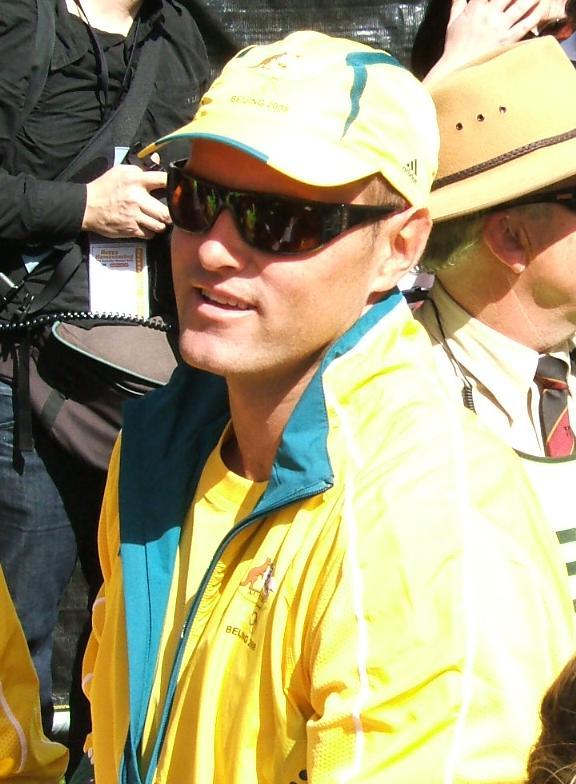
Andrew Schacht

Andrew Schacht (born 22 May 1973 in Adelaide) is a male beach volleyball player from Australia.

He represented Australia at the 2004 Summer Olympics, and the 2008 Summer Olympics, partnering with Joshua Slack in both events.

Originally an indoor volleyball player, Schacht transitioned to beach volleyball in 1996. He first competed in the Olympic Games in Athens in 2004, where he and Joshua Slack reached the round of sixteen. The pair teamed up again in Beijing in 2008, finishing in ninth place.
