= Alexander Horst =

Austrian beach volleyball player

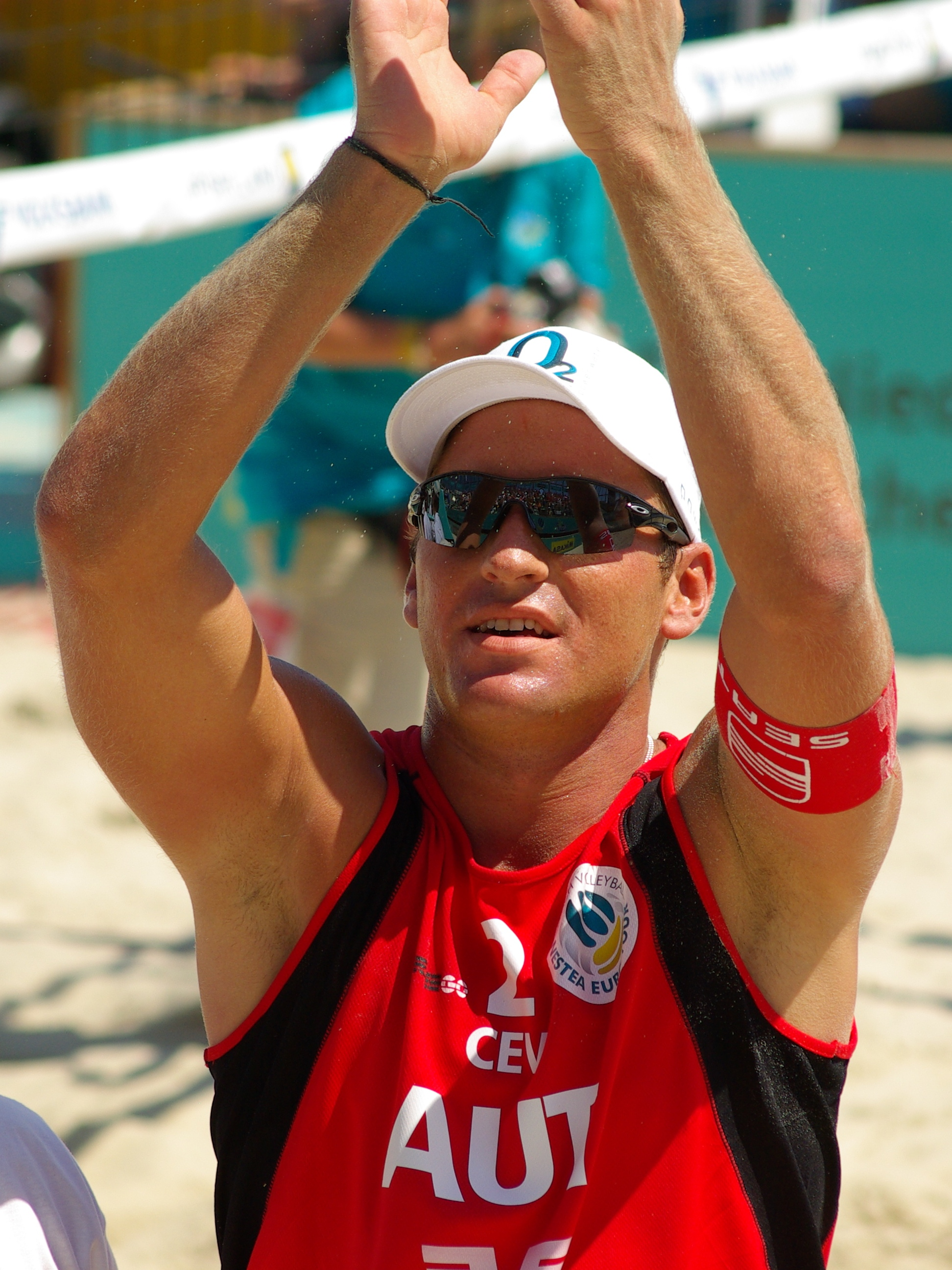

Personal information
- Nickname: The Pterodactyl
- Nationality: Austrian
- Born: 20 December 1982 (age 43); Vienna, Austria
- Hometown: Vienna
- Height: 185 cm (6 ft 1 in)
- Weight: 85 kg (187 lb)

Beach volleyball information

Current teammate
Teammate
Julian Hörl

Previous teammates
Teammate	Tours (points)
Daniel Müllner; Florian Gosch; Sebastian Goettlinger; Simon Nausch	12; 55; 1 (2)
Honours
Men's beach volleyball
Representing Austria
World Championships
Silver medal – second place	2017 Vienna	Beach
European Championships
Silver medal – second place	2009 Sochi	Beach
Bronze medal – third place	2014 Cagliari	Beach

Alexander Horst (born 20 December 1982) is an Austrian professional beach volleyball player. He currently plays on the FIVB World Beach Volleyball Tour with partner Clemens Doppler. Horst found most success with partner Florian Gosch on the FIVB World Beach Volleyball Tour, however a knee injury forced Gosch into early retirement in autumn 2010.

Horst and teammate Florian Gosch represented Austria at the 2008 Summer Olympics in Beijing, China. His career highlights include a 5th place showing at the Beijing Games, a 2nd place at the 2009 European Beach Volleyball Championships in Sochi, Russia, and a 2nd place at the Stare Jablonki Grand Slam in Poland in 2012.

== Professional career ==
=== 2007 ===
In his first full season playing with big blocker Gosch, the results were very positive including ninth-place positions at the Grand Slam in Stavanger, Norway, the Beach Volleyball World Championships in Gstaad, Switzerland and the European Beach Volleyball Championships in Spain. With 2 other 9th-place finishes at open tournaments along with a bronze medal at Åland, Finland, the team of Gosch-Horst was well on its way to olympic qualification.

=== 2008 ===
A disappointing season with no top 10 finishes up until the 2008 Summer Olympics in Beijing, China. In the games, they overcame possible elimination in the lucky loser bracket to post a very solid 5th-place finish in eventually losing to the Brazilian silver medalists, Marcio and Fabio.

=== 2009 ===
Achieved 7 top 10 finishes and won a silver medal at the European Beach Volleyball Championships in Sochi, Russia.

=== 2010 ===
Best finishes in 2010 include a 7th place showing early in the season in Shanghai, and a 4th-place finish in Marseille World Series in July. This in his last season playing with Gosch who would have to retire at the end of the season due to knee complications.

=== 2011 ===
After the retirement of Gosch, Horst played on the 2011 FIVB World Beach Volleyball Tour with new partner and beach volleyball rookie Daniel Müllner. Their best showing was a 17th place in the 2011 Beach Volleyball World Championships in Rome.

On 21 October 2011 the pair officially announced their split. Speculation began immediately of an Alexander Horst / Clemens Doppler duo, who also split from his partner on the same day. Horst and Doppler would go on to announce their partnership 2 weeks later.

=== 2012 ===
The season started out at the Myslowice Open in Poland. Horst and Doppler placed a solid 7th place to kick off the new season. Between mixed results in the FIVB World Tour and the 2012 CEV European Championships, Horst and Doppler posted a hometown win in Baden, Austria. However, their best success in the 2012 season was grabbing a last-minute spot in the 2012 Summer Olympics qualification round in Moscow on 1 July. The pair had a heartbreaking pool play loss to the Swiss Heuscher/Bellaguarda in the 2012 Summer Olympics, ending their olympic hopes in pool play at 19th place. One week after the Olympics, the Austrian duo rebounded for a silver team medal, beating the season's world champions Gibb/Rosenthal for their best showing on the FIVB tour by an Austrian men's pair ever.
