= Fábio Luiz Magalhães =

Brazilian beach volleyball player

Fábio Magalhães
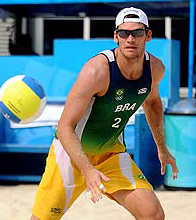

Personal information
- Full name: Fábio Luiz de Jesus Magalhães
- Born: 13 March 1979 (age 47); Marataízes, Brazil
- Height: 204 cm (6 ft 8 in)
Honours
Men's beach volleyball
Representing Brazil
Olympic Games
Silver medal – second place	2008 Beijing	Beach
World Championships
Gold medal – first place	2005 Berlin	Beach

Fábio Luiz de Jesus Magalhães (Portuguese pronunciation: [maɡaˈʎɐ̃js]; born 13 March 1979 in Marataízes) is a male beach volleyball player from Brazil.

Magalhães won the gold medal in the men's beach team competition at the 2005 Beach Volleyball World Championships in Berlin, Germany, and the silver medal at 2008 Summer Olympics in Beijing, China, partnering with Márcio Araújo.

== See also ==
- Beach volleyball at the 2008 Summer Olympics – Men's tournament
- Brazil at the 2008 Summer Olympics

Awards
Preceded by Inaugural	Men's FIVB World Tour "Best Blocker"; 2005	Succeeded by Phil Dalhausser (USA)
Preceded by Inaugural	Men's FIVB World Tour "Most Improved"; 2005	Succeeded by Phil Dalhausser (USA)
