= Márcio Araújo (volleyball) =

Brazilian beach volleyball player (born 1973)

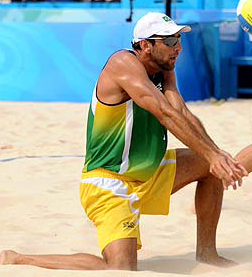

Personal information
- Full name: Márcio Henrique Barroso Araújo
- Born: 12 October 1973 (age 53) Fortaleza, Ceará, Brazil
- Height: 6 ft 4 in (1.93 m)
Honours
Men's beach volleyball
Representing Brazil
Olympic Games
Silver medal – second place	2008 Beijing	Beach
World Championships
Gold medal – first place	2005 Berlin	Beach
Silver medal – second place	2011 Rome	Beach
Bronze medal – third place	2003 Rio de Janeiro	Beach

Márcio Henrique Barroso Araújo (born 12 October 1973 in Fortaleza, Ceará) is a male beach volleyball player from Brazil. He won the gold medal in the men's beach team competition at the 2005 Beach Volleyball World Championships in Berlin, Germany, partnering with Fábio Luiz Magalhães.

Araújo represented his native country at the 2004 Summer Olympics in Athens, Greece, after having claimed the bronze medal alongside Benjamin Insfran at the 2003 Beach Volleyball World Championships in Rio de Janeiro, Brazil.

Awards
Preceded by Inaugural	Men's FIVB World Tour "Best Defender"; 2005	Succeeded by Todd Rogers (USA); Martín Conde (ARG)
Preceded by Todd Rogers (USA)	Men's FIVB World Tour "Best Setter"; 2006–2008	Succeeded by Phil Dalhausser (USA)
