= Todd Rogers =

American beach volleyball player

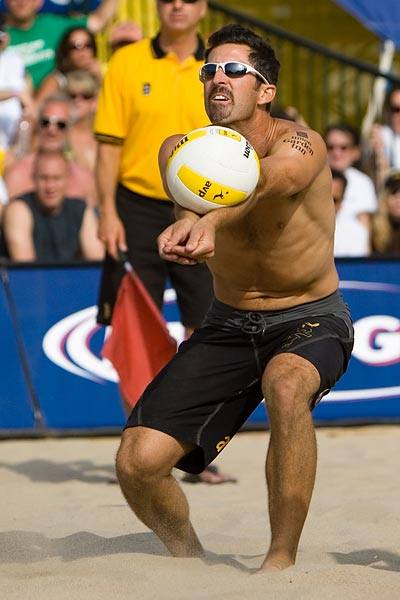
- Rogers in 2007

Personal information
- Full name: Todd Jonathan Rogers
- Nickname: The Professor
- Born: September 30, 1973 (age 53); Santa Barbara, California, U.S.
- Hometown: Santa Barbara, California, U.S.
- Height: 6 ft 2 in (188 cm)
- Weight: 90 kg (198 lb)
- Education: UC Santa Barbara Gauchos

Beach volleyball information

Current teammate
Years	Teammate
2013–	Theo Brunner

Previous teammates
Years	Teammate
1996–2001; 2001–2005; 2006–2012; 2013	Dax Holdren; Sean Scott; Phil Dalhausser; Ryan Doherty
Medal record
Men's beach volleyball
Representing the United States
Olympic Games
Gold medal – first place	2008 Beijing	Beach
World Championships
Gold medal – first place	2007 Gstaad	Beach
Bronze medal – third place	2009 Stavanger	Beach
World Tour
Gold medal – first place	2006 Austria	Beach
Gold medal – first place	2008 Paris	Beach
Gold medal – first place	2008 Stavanger	Beach
Gold medal – first place	2008 Moscow	Beach
Gold medal – first place	2009 Marseille	Beach
Gold medal – first place	2009 Klagenfurt	Beach
Gold medal – first place	2010 Brasília	Beach
Gold medal – first place	2010 Rome	Beach
Gold medal – first place	2010 Myslowice	Beach
Gold medal – first place	2010 Patria	Beach
Gold medal – first place	2010 Gstaad	Beach
Gold medal – first place	2010 Klagenfurt	Beach
Gold medal – first place	2010 Stare Jabłonki	Beach
Gold medal – first place	2010 Otera	Beach
Gold medal – first place	2010 PAF	Beach
Gold medal – first place	2011 Brasília	Beach
Gold medal – first place	2011 Shanghai	Beach
Gold medal – first place	2011 Québec	Beach
Gold medal – first place	2011 Stare Jabłonki	Beach
Gold medal – first place	2012 Brasilia	Beach
Gold medal – first place	2012 Shanghai	Beach
Silver medal – second place	2006 Croatia	Beach
Silver medal – second place	2007 Brazil	Beach
Silver medal – second place	2008 Berlin	Beach
Silver medal – second place	2010 Moscow	Beach
Silver medal – second place	2011 Prague	Beach
Silver medal – second place	2011 Gstaad	Beach
Silver medal – second place	2011 PAF	Beach
Bronze medal – third place	2006 Mexico	Beach
Bronze medal – third place	2007 Berlin	Beach
Bronze medal – third place	2008 Adelaide	Beach
Bronze medal – third place	2008 Italian	Beach
Bronze medal – third place	2010 Stavanger	Beach
Bronze medal – third place	2011 Moscow	Beach
Bronze medal – third place	2011 Klagenfurt	Beach
Bronze medal – third place	2012 Prague	Beach
Bronze medal – third place	2012 Stare Jabłonki	Beach
Bronze medal – third place	2014 Long Beach	Beach
- Last updated: October 5, 2014

Todd Jonathan Rogers (born September 30, 1973) is an American professional beach volleyball player who is an Olympic and FIVB Beach Volleyball World Championship gold medalist. He and his former partner, Phil Dalhausser, were the 2007, 2008, 2009, 2010, and 2011 AVP Tour champions.

In October 2021, he was inducted into the International Volleyball Hall of Fame, along with Logan Tom and Clay Stanley.

== Early life and education ==
Rogers was born in Santa Barbara, California to David and Heidi Rogers and brother Dean Rogers. Rogers attended San Marcos High School from 1987 to 1991, where he played indoor volleyball for Jon Lee. Together with teammate Dax Holdren, Rogers won a league championship in 1990. The following year, Rogers led his team to the CIF Southern Section Boys' Volleyball Championship. In addition to volleyball, Rogers played soccer at San Marcos High School.

After high school, Rogers enrolled at the University of California, Santa Barbara. He played for the men's volleyball team from 1993 through 1996 and was twice named a Second Team All-American by the American Volleyball Coaches Association in 1995 and 1996. Rogers set a school record for career digs with 783 (since surpassed) and placed second in career assists with 4,831. He earned a degree in religious studies with a minor in coaching.

== Playing career ==
=== Amateur ===
Rogers was originally turned on to beach volleyball by his San Marcos High School coach, Jon Lee, to stay fit for the indoor volleyball season. Rogers' first teammate was then-San Marcos High School teammate Clay Holdren, a cousin of Dax Holdren, in 1987.

After my first season on the freshman team, he told all of the guys to go down to the beach and play beach volleyball if they wanted to get better at indoors. He also threw in the caveat that there were a lot of pretty girls in bikinis down at the beach. Needless to say it got us down there and we all became hooked on the sport of beach volleyball.

— Rogers on why his high school coach, Jon Lee, urged him to start beach volleyball.

He later competed with Holdren; together, they entered professional tournaments starting in 1993. Rogers, however, could not collect any prize money to keep his amateur status with the National Collegiate Athletic Association, as he was also competing with the UC Santa Barbara Gauchos while a student-athlete. The duo competed in the Manhattan Beach Open in August 1995, finishing 25th.

=== 1996–2001: starting with Dax Holdren ===
After graduating from UC Santa Barbara, Rogers turned professional and kept Dax Holdren as his partner. The duo competed in the domestic AVP Tour and the international FIVB Beach Volleyball World Tour. Rogers took AVP Rookie of the Year honors in 1997. It took until the AVP Minneapolis Open in July 1998 for the pair to win their first tournament together while their first FIVB Beach Volleyball World Tour tournament win came in June 2000 at the Mexico Open in Rosarito, Mexico.

Rogers and Holdren spent 6 years as a professional tandem and achieved 5 first-place finishes on the AVP Tour and 1 first-place finish apiece on the FIVB Beach World Tour and the Beach Volleyball America Tour. He played every match during this span with Holdren, with exceptions being Kevin Martin for the 1997 AVP Tour Dallas Open, Canyon Ceman for the 1999 AVP Tour Cleveland Tournament of Champions, Stein Metzger for the 2000 FIVB Brazil Open, and various teammates for the 1998–2001 AVP Tour King of the Beach tournaments held in Las Vegas, before switching to Sean Scott permanently at the end of 2001.

=== 2001–2005: playing with Sean Scott ===
Rogers split with Holdren at the end of 2001 and partnered up with Sean Scott for Rogers' last event of the 2001 FIVB Beach Volleyball World Tour, the Brazil Open. The duo narrowly missed out on participation in the 2004 Summer Olympics as the third-best American teams while only two are sent. The pair found moderate success, winning on four separate AVP Tour stops. As with his previous partnership with Dax Holdren, Rogers played the overwhelming majority throughout this period with Scott, with the few exceptions being the start of the 2003 AVP Tour with Eli Fairfield for 2 tournaments, the 2005 AVP Austin Open with Reid Priddy, various teammates for the 2004 Best of the Beach and 2005 Las Vegas Shootout, and Phil Dalhausser for the 2005 Beach Volleyball World Championships before making a permanent switch to Dalhausser in 2006.

=== 2006–2012: dominance with Dalhausser ===
==== 2006 ====
While playing with Scott, Rogers took notice of a 6'9" up-and-comer named Phil Dalhausser. Recognizing his potential, Rogers partnered with him for the 2006 season and began coaching Dalhausser on the intricacies of the game.

The pair won eight AVP events and one FIVB event in 2006. Rogers also won the season-ending round-robin tournament, earning the title, "God of the Beach".

Despite their success, Rogers and Dalhausser finished the 2006 AVP season in second place, just six points shy of leaders Mike Lambert and Stein Metzger.

==== 2007 ====
Rogers and Dalhausser finished the 2007 AVP season as the dominant winners, finishing with more than 800 points over the second-place team with 10 tournament wins.

The duo also won the FIVB Beach Volleyball World Championships in Gstaad, Switzerland, the first such win in U.S. men's beach volleyball history.

==== 2008 ====
Rogers and Dalhausser have been a dominant force on both the 2008 AVP and FIVB tours. They have eight domestic wins, and three international wins, all in Grand Slam events.

In 2011 Rogers and Dalhauser set new single-season records for the most wins in a season on the FIVB, finishing the year as the world's number one ranked team.

== Olympics ==
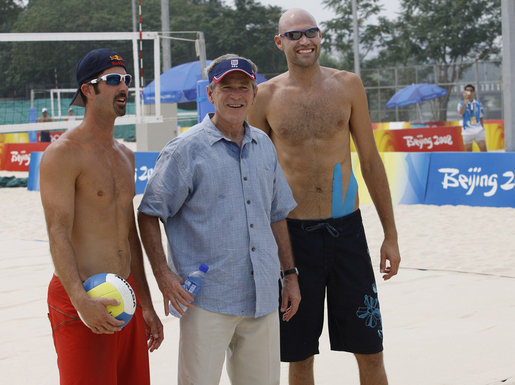
President George W. Bush poses with Rogers and teammate Phil Dalhausser as he visited the practice session Saturday, August 9, 2008, at Beijing's Chaoyang Park before their first matches of the Beijing 2008 Summer Olympics.

=== Athens 2004 ===
Despite being ranked as the #4 team in the world, Rogers and partner, Sean Scott, were beaten out for the top two available slots for U.S. teams. Rogers was named an alternate but did not play.

=== Beijing 2008 ===
Rogers and Dalhausser qualified as the number one team for the 2008 Olympics. After suffering a first-round surprise defeat to Latvia, Rogers and Dalhausser won the gold medal in beach volleyball at the 2008 Summer Olympics on August 22, 2008 by defeating the Brazilian team of Fabio/Marcio in three sets.

=== London 2012 ===
In a straight-set defeat, Rogers and Dalhausser failed to defend their gold medal at the London 2012 Summer Olympics, ousted in the round of 16, by the young Italian team of Paolo Nicolai and Daniele Lupo.

== Coaching career ==
Rogers was the assistant men's volleyball coach at UC Santa Barbara from 2000 to 2005. He left coaching to devote full-time attention to his professional career. Rogers and his partner Dalhausser won the 2008 Beijing Olympics gold medal in men's beach volleyball, topping off a year that saw them win nearly every tournament they entered. Early in 2016, Rogers was hired as head coach of the Cal Poly Women's Beach Volleyball team.

== Personal life ==
Rogers has been inducted into the Santa Barbara Athletic Round Table Hall of Fame for his achievements in the sport of indoor and beach volleyball. He is a surfer in his spare time.

== Awards and honors ==
- AVP Best Defensive Player 2004, 2005, 2006, 2007, 2008
- AVP Crocs Cup Champion 2007 (Phil Dalhausser), 2008 (Phil Dalhausser)
- AVP Most Valuable Player 2006
- AVP Rookie of the Year 1997
- AVP Team of the Year 2007 (Phil Dalhausser), 2008 (Phil Dalhausser)
- FIVB Best Defensive Player 2006, 2007, 2008
- FIVB Most Inspirational 2008
- FIVB Best Setter 2005

Sporting positions
Preceded by Julius Brink and Jonas Reckermann (GER)	Men's FIVB Beach Volley World Tour Winner alongside (United States) Phil Dalhausser; 2010	Succeeded by Alison Cerutti and Emanuel Rego (BRA)
Awards
Preceded by Inaugural	Men's FIVB World Tour "Best Setter"; 2005	Succeeded by Márcio Araújo (BRA)
Preceded by Márcio Araújo (BRA)	Men's FIVB World Tour "Best Defender"; 2006–2008	Succeeded by Reinder Nummerdor (NED)
Preceded by Reinder Nummerdor (NED)	Men's FIVB World Tour "Best Defender"; 2010	Succeeded by Reinder Nummerdor (NED)
Preceded by Franco Neto (BRA)	Men's FIVB World Tour "Most Inspirational"; 2008	Succeeded by Harley Marques (BRA)
Preceded by Julius Brink and Jonas Reckermann (GER)	Men's FIVB World Tour "Team of the Year" alongside (United States) Phil Dalhausser; 2010	Succeeded by Alison Cerutti and Emanuel Rego (BRA)
