= Reinder Nummerdor =

Dutch volleyball player (born 1976)

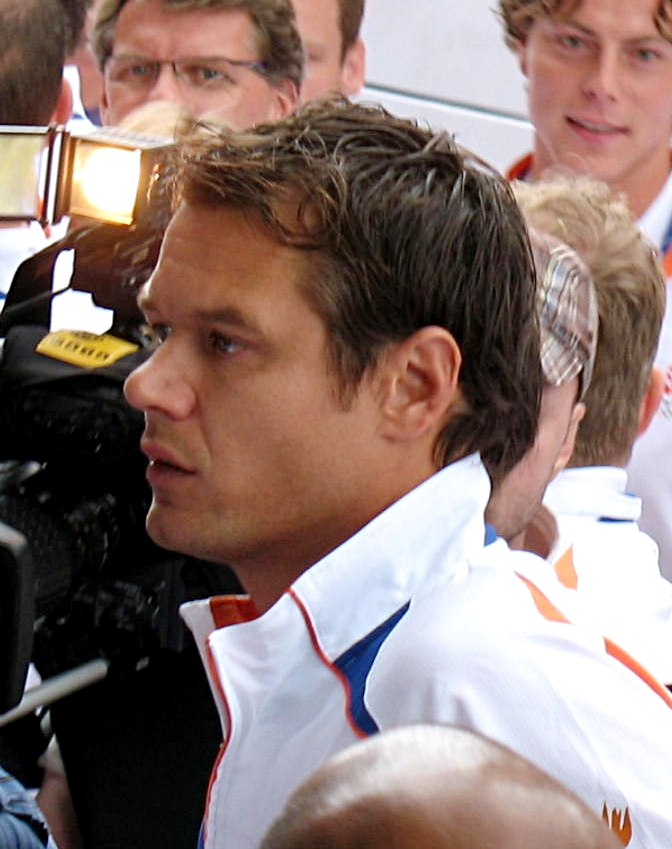

Medal record

Representing the Netherlands

Men's volleyball

FIVB World Cup
Silver medal – second place	1995 Japan	Indoor

World Grand Champions Cup
Silver medal – second place	1997 Japan	Indoor

European Championships
Gold medal – first place	1997 Netherlands	Indoor

Men's beach volleyball

World Beach Championships
Silver medal – second place	2015 The Hague	Beach

European Beach Championships
Gold medal – first place	2008 Hamburg	Beach
Silver medal – second place	2007 Valencia	Beach

Reinder Aart Nummerdor (born 10 September 1976) is a Dutch volleyball player who represented his native country at five consecutive Summer Olympics. Two times as a member of the indoor volleyball team in 2000 and 2004, and three more times after switching to beach volleyball.

Having finished in fifth place in Sydney, Australia he ended up in ninth place with the Dutch Men's National Team four years later in Athens, Greece. He earned a total number of 349 caps, and teamed up with Richard Schuil after the Athens Games for a career in beach volleyball. On 12 May 2007 in Bahrain, the two won their first FIVB World Tour gold medal. They won a silver medal in the same tour on 1 July in Stavanger. They reached the quarter-finals at the 2008 Summer Olympics, and the semi-finals in 2012. They lost in the bronze medal match against Plavins and Smedins of Latvia. Following Schuil's retirement, Nummerdor paired with Christiaan Varenhorst.

== Personal life ==
Nummerdor is married to the Dutch volleyball player Manon Nummerdor-Flier.

Awards
Preceded by Todd Rogers (USA)	Men's FIVB World Tour "Best Defender"; 2009	Succeeded by Todd Rogers (USA)
Preceded by Todd Rogers (USA)	Men's FIVB World Tour "Best Defender"; 2011	Succeeded by Mārtiņš Pļaviņš (LAT)
Preceded by Emanuel Rego (BRA)	Men's FIVB World Tour "Most Inspirational"; 2016	Succeeded by John Hyden (USA)
