= Volleyball at the 2008 Summer Olympics =

Volleyball at the Games of the XXIX Olympiad
- Pictograms for indoor (left) and beach volleyball (right)
- Venue: Capital Indoor Stadium and Beijing Institute of Technology Gymnasium (indoor); Chaoyang Park Beach Volleyball Ground (beach)
- Dates: 9 – 24 August 2008

Volleyball competitions (beach and indoor) at the 2008 Summer Olympics in Beijing were held from 9 to 24 August 2008. Indoor volleyball events were held at Capital Indoor Stadium and Beijing Institute of Technology Gymnasium. Beach volleyball competitions were held from 9 to 22 August 2008 at the Beach Volleyball Ground at Chaoyang Park.

The 2008 Summer Olympics volleyball competitions brought the introduction of the new ball with a new moulding design making it more softened compared to the Mikasa MVP200.

== Events ==
4 sets of medals were awarded in the following events:

- Indoor volleyball – men (12 teams)
- Indoor volleyball – women (12 teams)
- Beach volleyball – men (24 teams)
- Beach volleyball – women (24 teams)

== Medal summary ==
=== Medal table ===
Rank	Nation	Gold	Silver	Bronze	Total
1	United States	3	1	0	4
2	Brazil	1	2	1	4
3	China	0	1	2	3
4	Russia	0	0	1	1
Totals (4 entries)		4	4	4	12

=== Medalists ===
Event	Gold	Silver	Bronze
Men's indoor	United States; Lloy Ball; Sean Rooney; David Lee; Rich Lambourne (L); William Priddy; Ryan Millar; Riley Salmon; Thomas Hoff (c); Clayton Stanley; Kevin Hansen; Gabriel Gardner; Scott Touzinsky	Brazil; Bruno Rezende; Marcelo Elgarten; André Heller; Samuel Fuchs; Giba (c); Murilo Endres; André Nascimento; Sérgio Santos (L); Anderson Rodrigues; Gustavo Endres; Rodrigo Santana; Dante Amaral	Russia; Aleksandr Korneev; Semyon Poltavskiy; Aleksandr Kosarev; Sergey Grankin; Sergey Tetyukhin; Vadim Khamuttskikh (c); Yury Berezhko; Aleksey Ostapenko; Aleksandr Volkov; Aleksey Verbov (L); Maxim Mikhaylov; Aleksey Kuleshov
Women's indoor	Brazil; Walewska Oliveira; Carolina Albuquerque; Marianne Steinbrecher; Paula Pequeno; Thaisa Menezes; Hélia Souza (c); Valeska Menezes; Fabiana Claudino; Welissa Gonzaga; Jaqueline Carvalho; Sheilla Castro; Fabi (L)	United States; Ogonna Nnamani; Danielle Scott-Arruda; Tayyiba Haneef-Park; Lindsey Berg; Stacy Sykora (L); Nicole Davis (L); Heather Bown; Jennifer Joines; Kim Glass; Robyn Ah Mow-Santos (c); Kim Willoughby; Logan Tom	China; Wang Yimei; Feng Kun (c); Yang Hao; Liu Yanan; Wei Qiuyue; Xu Yunli; Zhou Suhong; Zhao Ruirui; Xue Ming; Li Juan; Zhang Na (L); Ma Yunwen
Men's beach	Todd Rogers and Phil Dalhausser; United States	Fábio Luiz Magalhães and Márcio Araújo; Brazil	Ricardo Santos and Emanuel Rego; Brazil
Women's beach	Kerri Walsh and Misty May-Treanor; United States	Wang Jie and Tian Jia; China	Zhang Xi and Xue Chen; China

== See also ==
- Volleyball at the 2008 Summer Paralympics
