= 2026 NCAA Beach Volleyball Championship =

Intercollegiate beach volleyball tournament

- Season: 2026 NCAA beach volleyball season
- Teams: 16
- Format: Single-elimination
- Finals site: Gulf Place Public Beach; Gulf Shores, Alabama
- Champions: UCLA (3rd title)
- Runner-up: Stanford (1st title game)
- Winning coach: Jenny Johnson Jordan (1st title)
- MVP: Maggie Boyd (UCLA)
- Television: ESPN networks

The 2026 NCAA Beach Volleyball Championship (officially the 2026 National Collegiate Beach Volleyball Championship) was an intercollegiate tournament to determine the National Collegiate Athletic Association (NCAA) women's beach volleyball national champion for the 2025–26 season. The tenth edition of the tournament was held from May 1 to 3, 2026, at Gulf Place Public Beach in Gulf Shores, Alabama. The 2026 championship featured a single-elimination-only bracket for the second time, along with a 16-team field. Eight of the participating schools automatically qualified by winning their respective conference tournaments, while the other eight were given at-large bids by the NCAA Women's Beach Volleyball Committee. The tournament will be broadcast on ESPN2 for the first round through the semifinals, and on ESPN for the championship match.

== Background ==
The National Collegiate Athletic Association (NCAA) began sponsoring women's beach volleyball as a championship sport in 2016, and the sport has since experienced rapid growth at the collegiate level, with a 500 percent increase in women's collegiate beach volleyball programs in the United States from 2011 to 2020. The NCAA Beach Volleyball Championship is the tournament held at the end of every regular season to determine the women's national collegiate champion across all NCAA divisions. It has been held annually since the inaugural 2016 event, (Note: Except in 2020 when the championship was canceled due to the COVID-19 pandemic.) and 2025 marked its ninth edition. The 2026 tournament will be held in Gulf Shores, Alabama, the same venue that hosted all eight previous championships, and was co-hosted by Gulf Shores Orange Beach Sports & Events, the city of Gulf Shores, and the University of Alabama at Birmingham. (Note: Before the NCAA-sanctioned championship, the American Volleyball Coaches Association (AVCA) also hosted a national championship for collegiate beach volleyball at the same Gulf Shores venue from 2012 to 2015.)

Popularized on the beaches of California in the 1920s, beach volleyball is a sport played by two teams on a sand court. At the professional level, teams consist of a pair of players who compete in best-of-three-set matches, where the first two sets are played to 21 points and the third set, if necessary, is played to 15 points; each set must be won by a minimum two-point lead. Conversely, NCAA beach volleyball is played using a flighted team-dual format. In an NCAA dual, each team fields five individual pairs who are ranked from No. 1 to No. 5 by skill level, and each pair plays a flighted best-of-three-set match against their corresponding pair on the other team. The first team to win three of the five pairs' matches wins the dual.

The NCAA Beach Volleyball Championship had historically been an eight-team double-elimination tournament, in which all participating teams were selected by the NCAA Women's Beach Volleyball Committee. However, with the growing popularity of the collegiate sport, the NCAA agreed to double the field for the 2022 championship, adding a 16-team opening knockout round that led into the established eight-team double-elimination bracket. Along with the expanded field, the qualification process introduced eight automatic bids that teams earned by winning their respective conference tournaments. Further changes were adopted for 2023, with the tournament becoming a single-elimination-only event, and the field expanded to 17 teams to allow for nine automatic qualifiers. However, this year the field has shrunk to 16 teams, removing the extra play-in game.

== Format and venue ==
The 2026 NCAA Beach Volleyball Championship is a 16-team tournament that will be held from May 1 to 3, 2026. The 16-team single-elimination bracket will begin on Friday, May 1, with the winning teams advancing to the quarterfinals and semifinals on Saturday, May 2, until a national champion was determined on Sunday, May 3.

Over the years, the playing conditions at the Gulf Shores venue have been characterized by several factors; namely the compact sand that makes it easier for players to move and jump, the strong winds, and the possibility of rain during that time of the year.

== Participating teams ==
Of the 104 eligible NCAA teams, a total of 16 will qualify for the tournament and will be seeded from No. 1 to No. 16. Eight of the teams will receive automatic bids by winning their respective conference tournaments. The remaining eight bids were allocated at large by the NCAA Women's Beach Volleyball Committee. The qualifying teams and seeding order will be announced by the committee on April 26, 2026.

=== Automatic bids ===
The following conferences' winner will receive an automatic bid by winning their conference tournaments.

| Team | Conference | Date qualified | Win–loss record | Appearance | Last bid |
|---|---|---|---|---|---|
| Stetson | ASUN | April 24, 2026 | 27–9 | 5th | 2023 |
| Cal Poly | Big West | April 24, 2026 | 30–8 | 6th | 2025 |
| Tulane | CUSA | April 25, 2026 | 26–13 | 1st | N/A |
| Texas | MPSF | April 24, 2026 | 26–6 | 2nd | 2025 |
| Chattanooga | Ohio Valley | April 25, 2026 | 24–4 | 3rd | 2025 |
| Texas A&M–Corpus Christi | Southland | April 24, 2026 | 23–9 | 4th | 2024 |
| Georgia State | Sun Belt | April 25, 2026 | 21–18 | 6th | 2025 |
| Loyola Marymount | West Coast | April 24, 2026 | 29–10 | 6th | 2025 |

=== At-large bids ===
Eight teams will be allocated at-large bids by the NCAA selection committee.

| Team | Conference | Win–loss record | Appearance | Last bid |
|---|---|---|---|---|
| California | MPSF | 23–13 | 5th | 2025 |
| Florida State | Big 12 | 33–2 | 10th | 2025 |
| Grand Canyon | MPSF | 19–15 | 3rd | 2023 |
| Long Beach State | Big West | 25–11 | 5th | 2025 |
| Stanford | MPSF | 36–4 | 6th | 2025 |
| TCU | Big 12 | 20–10 | 6th | 2025 |
| UCLA | MPSF | 30–6 | 10th | 2025 |
| USC | MPSF | 28–11 | 10th | 2025 |

=== Preview ===
From its inception in 2016 to 2024, only two teams, both from Los Angeles, had won the NCAA Beach Volleyball Championship: the USC Trojans (six titles and then at one point they were the four-time defending champion: 2016, 2017, 2021, 2022, 2023, and 2024) and the UCLA Bruins (two titles: 2018 and 2019). However, in 2025 TCU won the national championship, the first such team outside of Los Angeles. In 2026, the championship once again returned to the Los Angeles area, with UCLA winning their third title.

== Bracket ==
The tournament bracket goes as follows:

First round Friday, May 1 ESPN2
1 | Stanford | 3
16 | Chattanooga | 0
8 | California | 3
9 | Long Beach State | 2
5 | Florida State | 3
12 | Stetson | 0
4 | Southern California | 3
13 | Texas A&M-Corpus Christi | 0
3 | UCLA | 3
14 | Tulane | 0
6 | Cal Poly | 3
11 | Grand Canyon | 0
7 | Loyola Marymount | 3
10 | TCU | 2
2 | Texas | 3
15 | Georgia State | 0

Quarterfinals; Saturday, May 2 ESPN2
1 | Stanford | 3
8 | California | 1
5 | Florida State | 3
4 | Southern California | 0
3 | UCLA | 3
6 | Cal Poly | 1
7 | Loyola Marymount | 1
2 | Texas | 3

Semifinals; Saturday, May 2 ESPN2
1 | Stanford | 3
5 | Florida State | 1
3 | UCLA | 3
2 | Texas | 2

Finals; Sunday, May 3 ESPN
1 | Stanford | 0
3 | UCLA | 3
