= USC Trojans women's beach volleyball =

USC Women's Beach Volleyball
- University: University of Southern California
- Athletic director: Jennifer Cohen
- Head coach: Dain Blanton
- Conference: MPSF
- Location: Los Angeles, California
- Home arena: Merle Norman Stadium
- Nickname: Women of Troy

AIAW/NCAA Tournament champion
- 2016, 2017, 2021, 2022, 2023, 2024

AIAW/NCAA Tournament runner-up
- 2019

The USC Trojans women's beach volleyball team is coached by Olympic gold medalist Dain Blanton and competes in the Mountain Pacific Sports Federation. The team is the most successful college beach volleyball program with 6 NCAA national championships.

== History ==
The program began in 2012 with the construction of the university's new Merle Norman Stadium beach volleyball venue across the street from the Galen Center. USC played its first match in the stadium on March 10, 2013, and earned a 4-1 victory over Loyola Marymount.

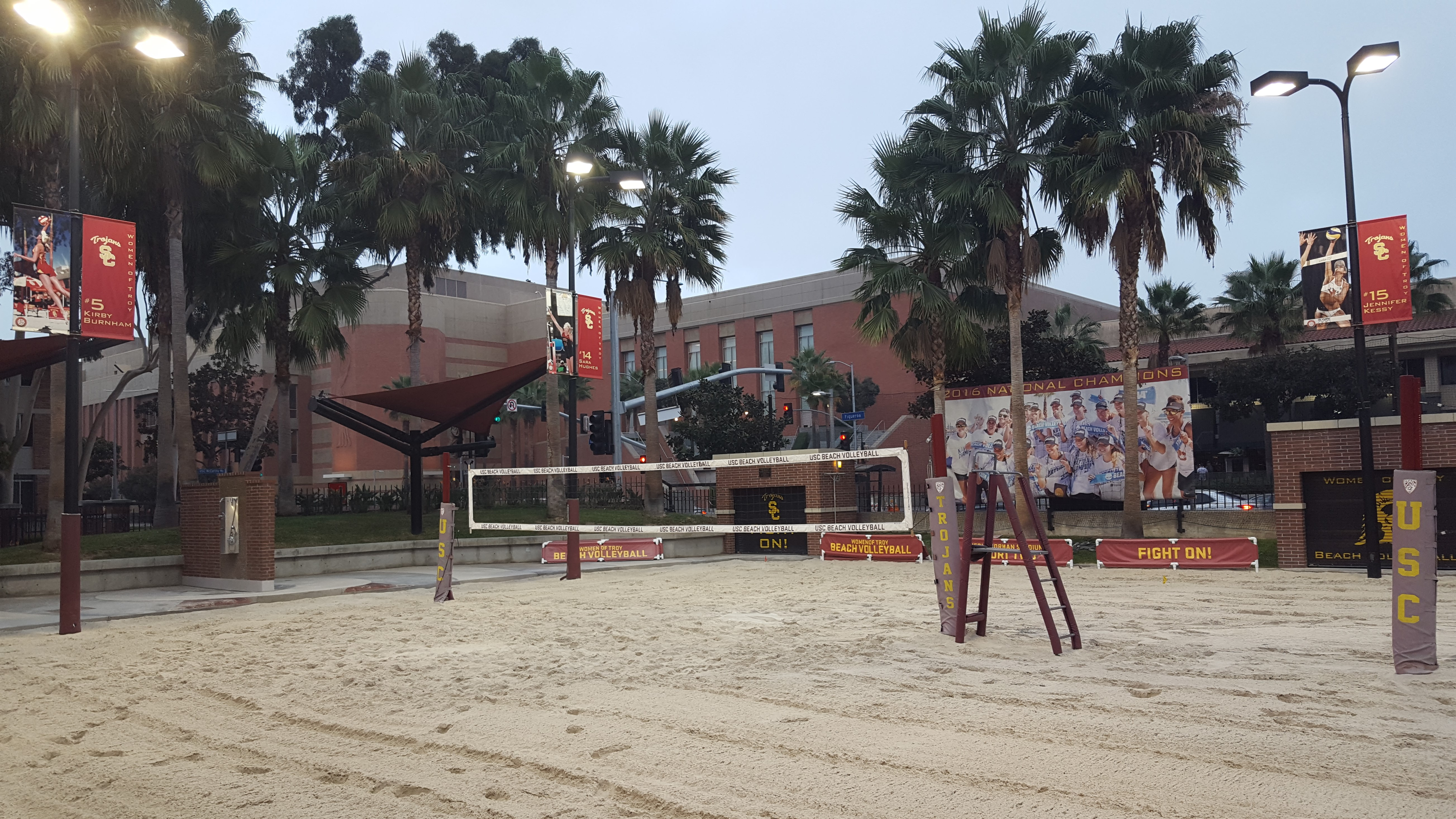
Merle Norman Stadium

Through the 2015 season, national championship play was conducted by the American Volleyball Coaches Association (AVCA). The Trojans won an AVCA national team title in 2015, with a USC team claiming the AVCA pairs championship in each of the 2013–2015 seasons.

The NCAA Beach Volleyball Championship was established in 2016, with the Trojans winning a record 6 national championships in 2016, 2017, 2021, 2022, 2023, and 2024.

== Notable players ==
- Kelly Cheng
- Tīna Graudiņa
- Natalie Hagglund
- Sara Hughes
- Geena Urango

== See also ==
- List of NCAA women's beach volleyball programs
