= Mac May =

American volleyball player (born 1999)

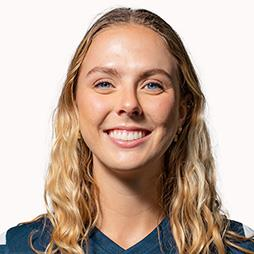
- May in 2022

Personal information
- Full name: MacKenzie Caitlin May
- Nickname: Mac
- Nationality: United States
- Born: January 12, 1999 (age 27); Dubuque, Iowa, U.S.
- Hometown: Dubuque, Iowa, U.S.
- Height: 6 ft 3 in (1.90 m)
- Education: UCLA

Volleyball information
- Position: Outside hitter
- Current club: Aras Kargo Spor Kulubu
- Number: 14

Career
Years	Teams
2017–2021	(United States) UCLA
2021–	(Italy) Volley Bergamo

National team
2022–	United States
Medal record
Volleyball
Representing the United States
Pan-American Cup
Bronze medal – third place	2022 Hermosillo
U20 Pan-American Cup
Gold medal – first place	2017 San José	Team

MacKenzie Caitlin May (born January 12, 1999) is an American professional volleyball player who currently plays as an outside hitter in Aras Kargo Spor Kulübü (Turkey) after finishing her most recent season at Rivale in the SV.League as the top server. Collegiately, she played for UCLA.

== Personal life ==
May was born and raised in Dubuque, Iowa. She began playing volleyball at age 7 and by age 8 she was playing on a team for 13 year olds. She attended Wahlert Catholic High School where she was a three-sport athlete as she played volleyball, track and field and soccer. She was considered the number 10 national recruit in her graduating class.

== Career ==
=== College ===
May played both indoor and beach volleyball while at UCLA. She played indoor college volleyball for a total of five years, as she opted to use the extra year of eligibility granted by the NCAA due to the COVID-19 pandemic. She was named to the Pac-12 All-Freshman Team in 2017. During her final three seasons, she was named an All-American and was a two-time Pac-12 Player of the Year. She finished her indoor career at UCLA as the only Bruin in program history to rank top 3 on UCLA's all-time kills (3rd, 2,065) and aces (3rd, 178) lists.

She played beach volleyball for UCLA in 2018, 2019, and 2020 where she finished with a career record of 38-13. She was part of UCLA's back-to-back NCAA Beach Volleyball Championship titles in 2018 and 2019.

=== Professional clubs ===
- (Italy) Volley Bergamo (2021–2023)
- Budowlani Łódź (2023-2024)
- Astemo Rivale Ibaraki (formerly known as Hitachi Rivale) (2024-2026)

== Awards and honors ==
=== College ===
- Three-time AVCA All-American (First Team – 2021, 2020; Second Team – 2019)
- Two-time Pac-12 Player of the Year (2019, 2021)
