= Hawaii Rainbow Wahine beach volleyball =

American college volleyball team

- University: University of Hawaii at Manoa
- Athletic director: Matt Elliott
- Head coach: Evan Silberstein (4th season)
- Conference: Big West
- Location: Honolulu, Hawaii
- Home arena: Queen's Beach
- Nickname: Rainbow Wahine

NCAA Tournament appearance
- 2016, 2017, 2018, 2019, 2022, 2023, 2024

Conference tournament champion
- 2016, 2017, 2018, 2024

AVCA Tournament appearance
- 2014, 2015

The Hawaiʻi Rainbow Wāhine beach volleyball team, more commonly known as the Hawaiʻi BeachBows, is the beach volleyball team representing the University of Hawaiʻi at Mānoa in NCAA Division I women's play.

== History ==
The university has a rich volleyball tradition. They have had four head coaches since the team's inception in 2012. In 2014 under head coach Scott Wong, they appeared in the NCAA Division I Final Four. During the 2015 season, they ranked first in attendance among all Division 1 volleyball beach programs. The "SandBows" averaged over 330 fans, each, for six home matches. With Collegiate Beach's inception, the Bows have been ranked in every AVCA Top 10 Poll to date. The university plays its home matches in the—five courted—The Clarence T.C. Ching Athletics Complex.

Angelica Ljungqvist assumed the role of head coach in August 2020 after the indoor and beach programs merged in a financial decision stemming from the COVID-19 pandemic.

== Year-by-year results ==
Statistics overview
Season	Coach	Overall	Conference	Standing	Postseason
Scott Wong (Big West Conference) (2012–2014)
2012	Scott Wong	4–6			AVCA Pool Play
2013	Scott Wong	5–7			
2014	Scott Wong	19–4	3–0		AVCA Semifinals
Scott Wong:		28–17 (.622)	3–0 (1.000)		
Jeff Hall (Big West Conference) (2015–2020)
2015	Jeff Hall	18–3			AVCA Quarterfinals
2016	Jeff Hall	18–10	3–0	1st	NCAA (4th)
2017	Jeff Hall	28–7	8–1	1st	NCAA (3rd)
2018	Jeff Hall	37–5	8–0	1st	NCAA (3rd)
2019	Jeff Hall	28–11	7–3	2nd	NCAA (4th)
2020	Jeff Hall	7–2 (Note: Season not played past March 1 due to COVID-19 pandemic)		T–1st	
Jeff Hall:		137–38 (.783)	26–4 (.867)		
Angelica Ljungqvist (Big West Conference) (2021–202_)
2021	Angelica Ljungqvist	17–10	11–7	2nd	
Angelica Ljungqvist:		17–10 (.630)	11–7 (.611)		
Evan Silberstein (Big West Conference) (2022–present)
2022	Evan Silberstein	24–17	9–3	2nd	NCAA (T-9th)
2023	Evan Silberstein	27–9	11–2	T-1st	NCAA (T-9th)
2024	Evan Silberstein	24-12	9-1	T-2nd	NCAA (T-9th)
2025	Evan Silberstein	14-21	6-5	3rd	
Evan Silberstein:		89–59 (.601)	35–11 (.761)		
Total:		271–124 (.686)			
National champion Postseason invitational champion Conference regular season champion Conference regular season and conference tournament champion Division regular season champion Division regular season and conference tournament champion Conference tournament champion

== Home Court/Practice and Training facilities ==
- Queen's Beach located on the Waikiki shore is the home court for the women's beach volleyball team.
- Clarence T. C. Ching Athletics Complex is the practice facility for the women's beach volleyball team.

== See also ==
- List of NCAA women's beach volleyball programs
