= South Carolina Gamecocks women's beach volleyball =

American college volleyball team

South Carolina Gamecocks
- Founded: 2014
- University: University of South Carolina
- Athletic director: Jeremiah Donati
- Head coach: Jose Loiola (1st season)
- Conference: Big 12
- Location: Columbia, South Carolina, US
- Home arena: Wheeler Beach
- Nickname: Gamecocks
- Colors: Garnet and black

AIAW/NCAA tournament appearance
- 2017, 2018

The South Carolina Gamecocks women's beach volleyball team represents the University of South Carolina in NCAA Division I college volleyball. The team was founded as an independent in 2014, with the upcoming 2026 season being its first in the Big 12 Conference. From 2016 to 2025, the Gamecocks competed in the Coastal Collegiate Sports Association (CCSA). Home matches are held at the on-campus Wheeler beach venue which sits between the Carolina Softball Stadium and Carolina Tennis Center.

== History ==
The South Carolina Gamecocks women's beach volleyball played their first season in 2014, led by head coach Moritz Moritz, who had previously served as an assistant coach on the Indoor South Carolina Gamecocks team. For the 2014 and 2015 seasons, the Gamecocks competed as an independent team; however, with the establishment of the NCAA Beach Volleyball Championship in 2016, the team joined the CCSA. At the time, they shared this 6-team conference with fellow SEC all-sport member LSU; Florida State; Tulane; TCU; and Missouri State. The number of conference beach volleyball teams used to be between 10-14 members, but a host of former members, left to start Conference USA Beach Volleyball in 2021, leaving the CCSA with 6 teams beginning in the 2022 season. The Gamecocks have qualified for the NCAA Tournament twice under Moritz, in 2017 and 2018, but failed to win a match in either appearance.

The CCSA dropped to 5 teams after the 2023 season when Missouri State and TCU became beach volleyball affiliates of Conference USA, and then to 4 a year later when Grand Canyon moved beach volleyball to the Mountain Pacific Sports Federation (MPSF). The final four CCSA teams (Florida State, LSU, South Carolina, Texas) initially announced they would join MPSF beach volleyball for the 2026 season, but South Carolina and Florida State instead joined Big 12 beach volleyball.

== Year-by-year results ==
Year	Head Coach	Overall	Winning Percentage	Conference	Standing	Postseason
South Carolina Gamecocks (Independent) (2014–2015)
2014	Moritz Moritz	5-12	.294	—	—	—
2015	Moritz Moritz	14-7	.667	—	—	—
South Carolina Gamecocks (Coastal Collegiate Sports Association) (2016–2025)
2016	Moritz Moritz	20–16	.556	5-5	5th	—
2017	Moritz Moritz	23-11	.676	11-5	4th	NCAA Tournament
2018	Moritz Moritz	24-9	.727	9-3	2nd	NCAA Tournament
2019	Moritz Moritz	20-11	.645	7-7	4th	—
2020	Moritz Moritz	5-7	.417	1-3	11th	Postseason Cancelled
2021	Moritz Moritz	23-9	.719	12-5	4th	—
2022	Moritz Moritz	20-12	.625	1-5	4th	—
2023	Moritz Moritz	19-12	.613	0-3	5th	—
2024	Moritz Moritz	20-16	.556	0-4	4th	
2025	Moritz Moritz	14–17	.452	0–3	4th	
South Carolina Gamecocks (Big 12 Conference) (2026–present)
2026	Jose Loiola	21-8	.724	1-2		—
Total		228-146	.609	CCSA 46-43' Big 12 1-2'		

== See also ==
- South Carolina Gamecocks
- South Carolina Gamecocks women's volleyball
- List of NCAA women's beach volleyball programs
