= 2025 NCAA Beach Volleyball Championship =

Intercollegiate beach volleyball tournament

- Season: 2025 NCAA beach volleyball season
- Teams: 16
- Format: Single-elimination
- Finals site: Gulf Place Public Beach; Gulf Shores, Alabama
- Champions: TCU (1st title)
- Runner-up: Loyola Marymount (1st title game)
- Winning coach: Hector Gutierrez (1st title)
- Television: ESPN networks

The 2025 NCAA Beach Volleyball Championship (officially the 2025 National Collegiate Beach Volleyball Championship) was an intercollegiate tournament to determine the National Collegiate Athletic Association (NCAA) women's beach volleyball national champion for the 2024–25 season. The ninth edition of the tournament was held from May 2 to 4, 2025, at Gulf Place Public Beach in Gulf Shores, Alabama. The 2025 championship features a single-elimination-only bracket for the second time, along with a 16-team field. Eight of the participating schools automatically qualified by winning their respective conference tournaments, while the other eight were given at-large bids by the NCAA Women's Beach Volleyball Committee. The tournament was broadcast on ESPN, ESPN2, ESPNU, & ESPN+.

TCU won the first national championship in its program history, taking down Loyola Marymount in the final duel, 3–2. It was also the first NCAA beach volleyball championship won by a school outside Los Angeles.

== Background ==
The National Collegiate Athletic Association (NCAA) began sponsoring women's beach volleyball as a championship sport in 2016, and the sport has since experienced rapid growth at the collegiate level, with a 500 percent increase in women's collegiate beach volleyball programs in the United States from 2011 to 2020. The NCAA Beach Volleyball Championship is the tournament held at the end of every regular season to determine the women's national collegiate champion across all NCAA divisions. It has been held annually since the inaugural 2016 event, (Note: Except in 2020 when the championship was canceled due to the COVID-19 pandemic.) and 2025 marked its ninth edition. The 2025 tournament will be held in Gulf Shores, Alabama, the same venue that hosted all eight previous championships, and was co-hosted by Gulf Shores Orange Beach Sports & Events, the city of Gulf Shores, and the University of Alabama at Birmingham. (Note: Before the NCAA-sanctioned championship, the American Volleyball Coaches Association (AVCA) also hosted a national championship for collegiate beach volleyball at the same Gulf Shores venue from 2012 to 2015.)

Popularized on the beaches of California in the 1920s, beach volleyball is a sport played by two teams on a sand court. At the professional level, teams consist of a pair of players who compete in best-of-three-set matches, where the first two sets are played to 21 points and the third set, if necessary, is played to 15 points; each set must be won by a minimum two-point lead. Conversely, NCAA beach volleyball is played using a flighted team-dual format. In an NCAA dual, each team fields five individual pairs who are ranked from No. 1 to No. 5 by skill level, and each pair plays a flighted best-of-three-set match against their corresponding pair on the other team. The first team to win three of the five pairs' matches wins the dual.

The NCAA Beach Volleyball Championship had historically been an eight-team double-elimination tournament, in which all participating teams were selected by the NCAA Women's Beach Volleyball Committee. However, with the growing popularity of the collegiate sport, the NCAA agreed to double the field for the 2022 championship, adding a 16-team opening knockout round that led into the established eight-team double-elimination bracket. Along with the expanded field, the qualification process introduced eight automatic bids that teams earned by winning their respective conference tournaments. Further changes were adopted for 2023, with the tournament becoming a single-elimination-only event, and the field expanded to 17 teams to allow for nine automatic qualifiers. However, this year the field has shrunk to 16 teams, removing the extra play-in game.

== Format and venue ==
The 2025 NCAA Beach Volleyball Championship is a 16-team tournament that will be held from May 2 to 4, 2025. The 16-team single-elimination bracket will begin on Friday, May 2, with the winning teams advancing to the quarterfinals and semifinals on Saturday, May 3, until a national champion was determined on Sunday, May 4.

The tournament was originally supposed to be in Huntington Beach, California but due to the wildfires in the Los Angeles area in January things got moved over to the Gulf Place Public Beach in Gulf Shores in Alabama which has been set up with five playing courts and five practice courts. Over the years, the playing conditions at the Gulf Shores venue have been characterized by several factors; namely the compact sand that makes it easier for players to move and jump, the strong winds, and the possibility of rain during that time of the year.

== Participating teams ==
Of the 103 eligible NCAA teams, a total of 16 qualified for the tournament and were seeded from No. 1 to No. 16. Eight of the teams earned automatic bids by winning their respective conference tournaments. The remaining eight bids were allocated at large by the NCAA Women's Beach Volleyball Committee. The qualifying teams and seeding order were announced by the committee on April 27, 2025.

=== Automatic bids ===
The following eight teams earned automatic bids by winning their conference tournaments.

Team	Conference	Date qualified	Win–loss record	Appearance	Last bid
North Florida	ASUN	April 26, 2025	26–10	2nd	2024
Long Beach State	Big West	April 26, 2025	27–11	4th	2024
FAU	CUSA	April 26, 2025	21–14	3rd	2023
Stanford	MPSF	April 26, 2025	31–8	5th	2024
Chattanooga	Ohio Valley	April 26, 2025	26–5	2nd	2024
Boise State	Southland	April 25, 2025	23–11	1st	–
Georgia State	Sun Belt	April 26, 2025	22–16	5th	2024
Loyola Marymount	West Coast	April 25, 2025	35–6	5th	2024

=== At-large bids ===
The following eight teams were allocated at-large bids by the NCAA selection committee.

Team	Conference	Win–loss record	Appearance	Last bid
UCLA	MPSF	30–6	9th	2024
TCU	Big 12	28–5	5th	2024
USC	MPSF	26–10	9th	2024
Cal Poly	Big West	29–7	5th	2024
Texas	CCSA	27–9	1st	–
Florida State	CCSA	25–12	9th	2024
California	MPSF	27–9	4th	2024
LSU	CCSA	24–12	8th	2024

=== Preview ===
From its inception in 2016 to 2024, only two teams, both from Los Angeles, had won the NCAA Beach Volleyball Championship: the USC Trojans (six titles and four-time defending champion: 2016, 2017, 2021, 2022, 2023, and 2024) and the UCLA Bruins (two titles: 2018 and 2019). Both teams are in the running for the title once again in 2025. UCLA entered the NCAA tournament seeded No. 1 and TCU as top of the American Volleyball Coaches Association's (AVCA) rankings.

== Bracket ==
The tournament bracket goes as follows:

First round Friday, May 2
1	UCLA	3
16	Chattanooga	0
8	Florida State	3
9	Long Beach	1
5	USC	3
12	North Florida	0
4	Loyola Marymount	3
13	Florida Atlantic	0
3	Stanford	3
14	Boise State	0
6	Cal Poly	3
11	LSU	0
7	Texas	3
10	California	2
2	TCU	3
15	Georgia State	0

Quarterfinals; Saturday, May 3
1	UCLA	3
8	Florida State	0
5	USC	1
4	Loyola Marymount	3
3	Stanford	1
6	Cal Poly	3
7	Texas	0
2	TCU	3

Semifinals; Saturday, May 3
1	UCLA	2
4	Loyola Marymount	3
6	Cal Poly	1
2	TCU	3

Finals; Sunday, May 4
4	Loyola Marymount	2
2	TCU	3
