= NCAA beach volleyball championship =

American collegiate-level women's tournament

- Current season, competition or edition: 2026 NCAA Beach Volleyball Championship
- Sport: College beach volleyball
- Founded: 2016
- No. of teams: 16
- Country: United States
- Most recent champion: UCLA (3)
- Most titles: USC (6)
- Broadcasters: ESPN (current) and truTV, TBS (former)
- Website: https://www.ncaa.com/sports/beach-volleyball

The NCAA Beach Volleyball Championship is an NCAA-sanctioned tournament to determine the national champions of collegiate women's beach volleyball. It is a National Collegiate Championship featuring teams from Division I, Division II and Division III, and is became the 90th NCAA championship event.

It was the first new NCAA championship to be created since the NCAA Division III Men's Volleyball Championship in 2012, and the first for women since the NCAA Bowling Championship in 2004.

USC have been the most successful program, with six national titles.

== History ==
The championship was approved by the NCAA Convention during the fall of 2015, and a committee was selected to determine the tournament's organizational structure. Before 2015, sand volleyball had been part of the NCAA Emerging Sports for Women program (which included women's ice hockey, bowling, rowing, and water polo in the past). As such, a separate championship had been contested annually, since 2012, by the American Volleyball Coaches Association. Before 2012 several championships were televised by Collegiate Nationals. As of 2015, over 50 schools (from Divisions I, II, and III) had sponsored sand volleyball, ten more than the total number of required programs.

The sport's name was changed from "sand volleyball" to the more usual "beach volleyball" in June 2015, and the committee overseeing the sport is now named the NCAA Beach Volleyball Committee.

=== Structure ===
==== 2016–2021 ====
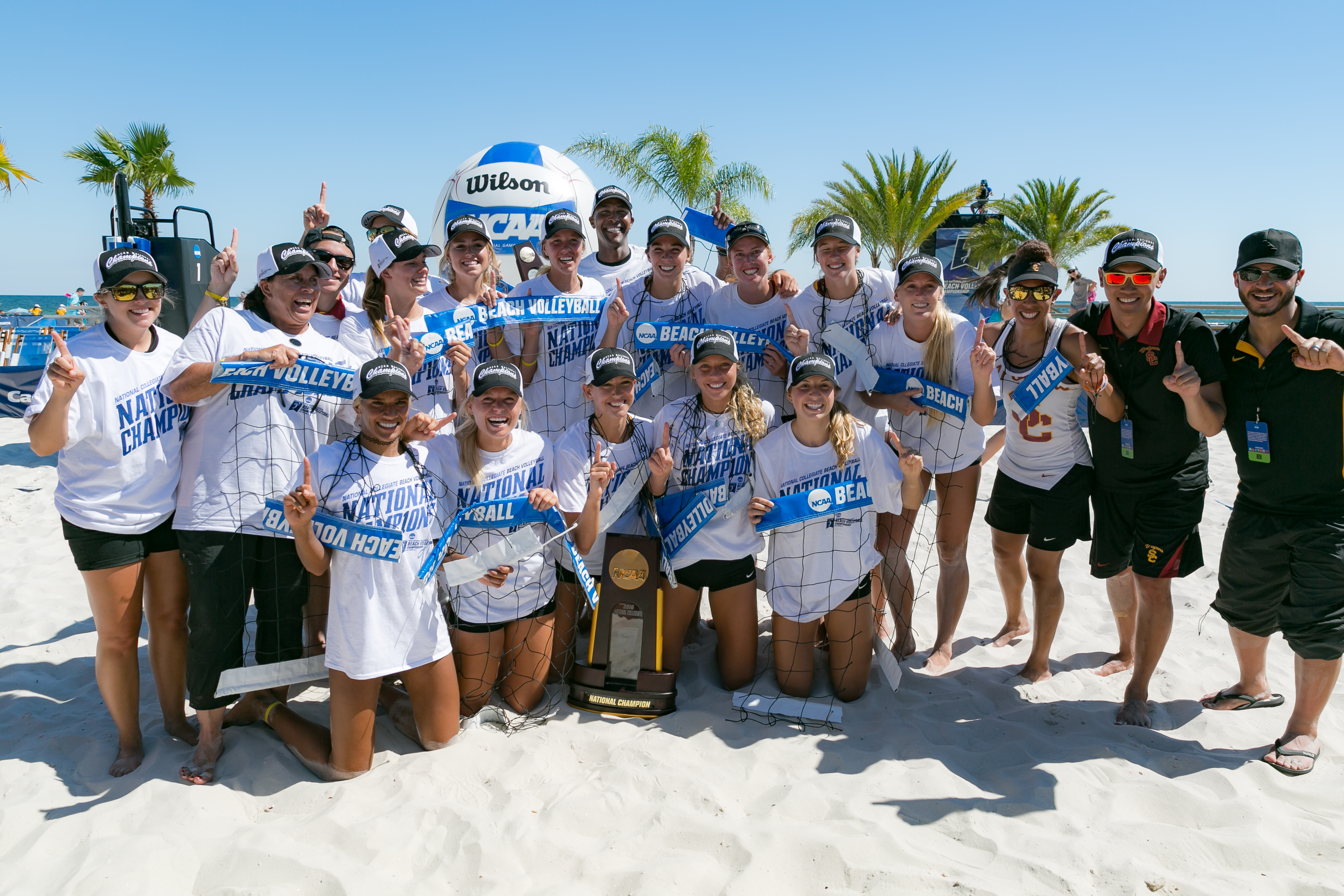
USC at the inaugural tournament

The championship is held each May. From 2016 through 2021, eight teams participated, in a double-elimination style tournament with a single-elimination final, under standard beach volleyball rules. All duals consist of five matches, with each team needing to win three matches to advance.

The NCAA does not add automatic qualifiers until two championship seasons have passed; but in 2016, the top 3 teams from the east and west were given automatic bids with 2 additional teams invited at-large.

As of fall 2019, seven conferences sponsored beach volleyball, all with at least six members — the minimum number for a conference to qualify for an automatic bid to other NCAA championship tournaments. Five of these conferences were represented in the inaugural tournament; the exceptions were the Ohio Valley Conference and Southland Conference, both of which began beach volleyball sponsorship in the 2020 season.

- ASUN Conference (7 members)
- Big West Conference (7 members)
- Coastal Collegiate Sports Association (12 members)
- Ohio Valley Conference (6 members)
- Pac-12 Conference (9 members)
- Southland Conference (9 members)
- West Coast Conference (7 members)

==== 2022, 2025-present ====
From 2022 onwards, the championship tournament was expanded to 16 teams. In 2025 the number of conferences eligible for an Automatic Bid returned to 8 and the Tournament returned to 16 teams.

- Atlantic Sun Conference
- Big West Conference
- Conference USA
- Mountain Pacific Sports Federation
- Ohio Valley Conference
- Southland Conference
- Sun Belt Conference
- West Coast Conference

Additionally, two teams from the East Region and two teams from the West Region will be given bids by the NCAA beach volleyball committee, while the final four teams will be selected at large.

==== 2023–2024 ====
Starting in 2023, the tournament switched to a standard single elimination bracket from the partial double elimination bracket system used before. The field was also expanded to 17 teams to allow for nine automatic qualifiers.

== Results ==
NCAA Beach Volleyball Championship
Year	Site (Host)	Host Venue	Final			Semifinalists	
Year	Site (Host)	Host Venue	Winner	Score	Runner-up	Third Place	Fourth Place
2016; Details	Gulf Shores, AL (UAB)	Gulf Shores Public Beach	USC	3–0	Florida State	UCLA	Hawaii
2017; Details	Gulf Shores, AL (UAB)	Gulf Shores Public Beach	USC (2)	3–2	Pepperdine	Hawaii	Florida State
2018; Details	Gulf Shores, AL (UAB)	Gulf Shores Public Beach	UCLA	3-1	Florida State	Hawaii	USC
2019; Details	Gulf Shores, AL (UAB)	Gulf Shores Public Beach	UCLA (2)	3-0	USC	LSU	Hawaii
2020	Canceled due to the COVID-19 pandemic						
2021; Details	Gulf Shores, AL (UAB)	Gulf Shores Public Beach	USC (3)	3–1	UCLA	Loyola Marymount	LSU
2022; Details	Gulf Shores, AL (UAB)	Gulf Shores Public Beach	USC (4)	3–1	Florida State	UCLA	Loyola Marymount
2023; Details	Gulf Shores, AL (UAB)	Gulf Shores Public Beach	USC (5)	3–2	UCLA	Florida State/TCU	
2024; Details	Gulf Shores, AL (UAB)	Gulf Shores Public Beach	USC (6)	3–0	UCLA	Cal Poly/LSU	
2025; Details	Gulf Shores, AL (UAB)	Gulf Shores Public Beach	TCU	3–2	Loyola Marymount	Cal Poly/UCLA	
2026; Details	Gulf Shores, AL (UAB)	Gulf Shores Public Beach	UCLA (3)	3–0	Stanford	Florida State/Texas	
2027; Details	Gulf Shores, AL (UAB)	Gulf Shores Public Beach					
2028; Details	Gulf Shores, AL (UAB)	Gulf Shores Public Beach					
2029; Details	Gulf Shores, AL (UAB)	Gulf Shores Public Beach					
2030; Details	Gulf Shores, AL (UAB)	Gulf Shores Public Beach					
2031; Details	Gulf Shores, AL (UAB)	Gulf Shores Public Beach					

== Summary ==
=== Team Titles ===
Team	#	Years
USC	6	2016, 2017, 2021, 2022, 2023, 2024
UCLA	3	2018, 2019, 2026
TCU	1	2025

== Result by school and by year ==
Twenty-eight teams have appeared in the NCAA Tournament in at least one year starting with 2016. The results for all years are shown below. The code in each cell represents the furthest the team made it in the respective tournament. Each team's seed in the tournament is shown in superscript to the right of the team's result.

- CH National Champion
- RU National Runner-up

2016 to 2022: double elimination format

- 3 3rd place
- 4 4th place
- 5 Tied for 5th place
- 7 Tied for 7th place
- ✖ Round of 16 (2022 only)

2023 to present: single elimination format

- SF Semifinals
- QF Quarterfinals
- ✖ Round of 16
- P Play-in Round (2023 & 2024 only)

School	Conference	#	T8	T4	T2	CH	16	17	18	19	21	22	23	24	25	26
USC	MPSF	10	10	8	7	6	²CH	¹CH	⁵4	¹RU	²CH	¹CH	³CH	¹CH	⁵QF	⁴QF
UCLA	MPSF	10	10	9	6	3	⁴3	²5	¹CH	²CH	¹RU	³3	¹RU	²RU	¹SF	³CH
TCU	Big 12	6	4	2	1	1					⁸7	²7	²SF	⁶✖	²CH	¹⁰✖
Florida State	Big 12	10	10	6	3	-	¹RU	⁴4	⁴RU	³5	³5	⁵RU	⁴SF	⁴QF	⁸QF	⁵SF
Loyola Marymount	West Coast	6	6	3	1	-					⁵3	⁴4	⁶QF	⁸QF	⁴RU	⁷QF
Stanford	MPSF	6	5	1	1	-					⁶7	⁹✖	¹⁰QF	³QF	³QF	¹RU
Pepperdine	West Coast	4	4	1	1	-	³5	³RU	²5	⁴7						
Hawaii	Big West	7	4	4	-	-	⁵4	⁵3	³3	⁷4		¹³✖	¹¹✖	⁹✖		
LSU	MPSF	8	7	3	-	-		⁷5	⁷5	⁵3	⁴4	⁶5	⁵QF	¹¹SF	¹¹✖	
Cal Poly	Big West	6	5	2	-	-				⁶7	⁷5	¹²✖		⁵SF	⁶SF	⁶QF
Texas	MPSF	2	2	1	-	-									⁷QF	²SF
California	MPSF	5	3	-	-	-						¹¹✖	⁸QF	⁷QF	¹⁰✖	⁸QF
Georgia State	Sun Belt	6	2	-	-	-	⁷7					¹⁰5	¹⁴✖	¹⁴✖	¹⁵✖	¹⁵✖
Stetson	ASUN	5	2	-	-	-	⁸7			⁸5		¹⁴✖	¹⁵✖			¹²✖
South Carolina	Big 12	2	2	-	-	-		⁸7	⁶7							
Long Beach State	Big West	5	1	-	-	-		⁶7					⁹✖	¹⁰✖	⁹✖	⁹✖
Florida Atlantic	CUSA	3	1	-	-	-						⁸7	¹²✖		¹³✖	
FIU	CUSA	2	1	-	-	-			⁸7				¹³✖			
Arizona	Big 12	1	1	-	-	-	⁶5									
Texas A&M–Corpus Christi	Southland	4	-	-	-	-						¹⁵✖	¹⁷✖	¹⁵✖		¹³✖
Grand Canyon	MPSF	3	-	-	-	-						⁷✖	⁷✖			¹¹✖
Chattanooga	Ohio Valley	3	-	-	-	-								¹⁷P	¹⁶✖	¹⁶✖
UT Martin	Ohio Valley	2	-	-	-	-						¹⁶✖	¹⁶P			
North Florida	ASUN	2	-	-	-	-								¹⁶✖	¹²✖	
Arizona State	Big 12	1	-	-	-	-								¹²✖		
Washington	MPSF	1	-	-	-	-								¹³✖		
Boise State	Big 12	1	-	-	-	-									¹⁴✖	
Tulane	CUSA	1	-	-	-	-										¹⁴✖

== Broadcasting ==
Turner Sports held broadcast rights to the tournament for the first two years (2016 and 2017), with early-round coverage airing on TruTV, and the championship game broadcast on TBS. In December 2017, ESPN signed a multiyear agreement to broadcast the NCAA Women's Beach Volleyball Championship through 2022.

== See also ==
- American Volleyball Coaches Association – previous sponsor of collegiate beach volleyball tournaments in the United States
- NCAA Men's Indoor Volleyball Championships (National Collegiate, Division III)
- NCAA Women's Indoor Volleyball Championships (Division I, Division II, Division III)
- NAIA Women's Beach Volleyball Invitational
- List of NCAA women's beach volleyball programs
