= 2023 NCAA Beach Volleyball Championship =

Intercollegiate beach volleyball tournament

- Logo
- Season: 2023 NCAA beach volleyball season
- Teams: 17
- Format: Single-elimination
- Finals site: Gulf Place Public Beach; Gulf Shores, Alabama
- Champions: USC Trojans (5th title)
- Runner-up: UCLA Bruins
- Winning coach: Dain Blanton (3rd title)
- Attendance: 11,667
- Television: ESPN networks

The 2023 NCAA Beach Volleyball Championship (officially the 2023 National Collegiate Beach Volleyball Championship) was an intercollegiate tournament to determine the National Collegiate Athletic Association (NCAA) women's beach volleyball national champion for the 2022–23 season. The seventh edition of the tournament was held from May 3 to 7, 2023, at Gulf Place Public Beach in Gulf Shores, Alabama. The 2023 championship featured a single-elimination-only bracket for the first time, along with an expanded 17-team field. Nine of the participating schools automatically qualified by winning their respective conference tournaments, while the other eight were given at-large bids by the NCAA Women's Beach Volleyball Committee. The tournament was broadcast on ESPN, ESPN2, and ESPNU.

== Background ==
The National Collegiate Athletic Association (NCAA) began sponsoring women's beach volleyball as a championship sport in 2016, and the sport has since experienced rapid growth at the collegiate level, with a 500 percent increase in women's collegiate beach volleyball programs in the United States from 2011 to 2020. The NCAA Beach Volleyball Championship is the tournament held at the end of every regular season to determine the women's national collegiate champion across all NCAA divisions. It has been held annually since the inaugural 2016 event, (Note: Except in 2020 when the championship was canceled due to the COVID-19 pandemic.) and 2023 marked its seventh edition. The 2023 tournament was held in Gulf Shores, Alabama, the same venue that hosted all six previous championships, and was co-hosted by Gulf Shores Orange Beach Sports & Events, the city of Gulf Shores and the University of Alabama at Birmingham. (Note: Before the NCAA-sanctioned championship, the American Volleyball Coaches Association (AVCA) also hosted a national championship for collegiate beach volleyball at the same Gulf Shores venue from 2012 to 2015.)

Popularized on the beaches of California in the 1920s, beach volleyball is a sport played by two teams on a sand court. At the professional level, teams consist of a pair of players who compete in best-of-three-set matches, where the first two sets are played to 21 points and the third set, if necessary, is played to 15 points; each set must be won by a minimum two-point lead. Conversely, NCAA beach volleyball is played using a flighted team-dual format. In an NCAA dual, each team fields five individual pairs who are ranked from No. 1 to No. 5 by skill level, and each pair plays a flighted best-of-three-set match against their corresponding pair on the other team. The first team to win three of the five pairs' matches wins the dual.

The NCAA Beach Volleyball Championship had historically been an eight-team double-elimination tournament, in which all participating teams were selected by the NCAA Women's Beach Volleyball Committee. However, with the growing popularity of the collegiate sport, the NCAA agreed to double the field for the 2022 championship, adding a 16-team opening knockout round that led into the established eight-team double-elimination bracket. Along with the expanded field, the qualification process introduced eight automatic bids that teams earned by winning their respective conference tournaments. Further changes were adopted for 2023, with the tournament becoming a single-elimination-only event, and the field expanded to 17 teams to allow for nine automatic qualifiers.

== Format and venue ==
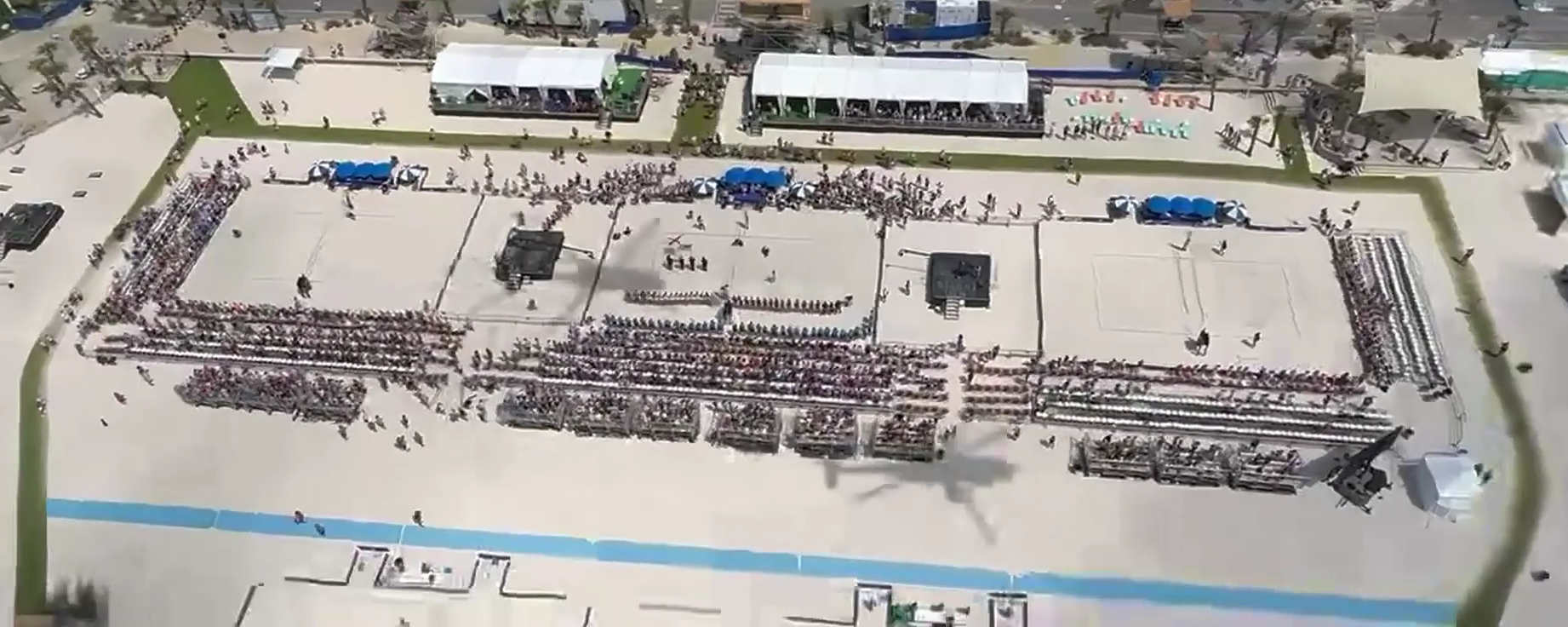
The 2023 tournament site at the public beach in Gulf Shores

The 2023 NCAA Beach Volleyball Championship was a 17-team tournament that was held from May 3 to 7, 2023. The tournament began on Wednesday, May 3, with a play-in dual between the two lowest seeded teams. The 16-team single-elimination main bracket began on Friday, May 5, with the winning teams advancing to the quarterfinals and semifinals on Saturday, May 6, until a national champion was determined on Sunday, May 7.

The tournament took place on one site at the Gulf Place Public Beach in Gulf Shores, which had been set up with five playing courts and five practice courts. Over the years, the playing conditions at the Gulf Shores venue have been characterized by several factors; namely the compact sand that makes it easier for players to move and jump, the strong winds, and the possibility of rain during that time of the year.

== Participating teams ==
Of the 93 eligible NCAA teams, a total of 17 qualified for the tournament and were seeded from No. 1 to No. 17. Nine of the teams earned automatic bids by winning their respective conference tournaments. The remaining eight bids were allocated at large by the NCAA Women's Beach Volleyball Committee. The qualifying teams and seeding order were announced by the committee on April 30, 2023.

=== Automatic bids ===
The following nine teams earned automatic bids by winning their conference tournaments.

Team	Conference	Date qualified	Win–loss record	Appearance	Last bid	Ref
Long Beach State athletics	Big West	April 22, 2023	24–14	2nd	2017	
Stetson Hatters	ASUN	April 23, 2023	20–16	4th	2022	
Texas A&M–Corpus Christi Islanders	Southland	April 24, 2023	24–9	2nd	2022	
Loyola Marymount Lions	West Coast	April 28, 2023	28–8	3rd	2022	
UCLA Bruins	Pac-12	April 28, 2023	37–3	7th	2022	
Florida Atlantic Owls	C-USA	April 29, 2023	19–13	2nd	2022	
Georgia State Panthers	Sun Belt	April 29, 2023	20–16	3rd	2022	
TCU Horned Frogs	CCSA	April 29, 2023	35–2	3rd	2022	
UT Martin Skyhawks	Ohio Valley	April 29, 2023	27–8	2nd	2022	

=== At-large bids ===
The following eight teams were allocated at-large bids by the NCAA selection committee.

Team	Conference	Win–loss record	Appearance	Last bid	Ref
California Golden Bears	Pac-12	28–9	2nd	2022	
FIU Panthers	Sun Belt	20–16	2nd	2018	
Florida State Seminoles	CCSA	30–8	7th	2022	
Grand Canyon Antelopes	CCSA	26–7	2nd	2022	
Hawaii Rainbow Wāhine	Big West	27–8	6th	2022	
LSU Tigers	CCSA	26–12	6th	2022	
Stanford Cardinal	Pac-12	28–12	3rd	2022	
USC Trojans	Pac-12	28–5	7th	2022	

=== Preview ===
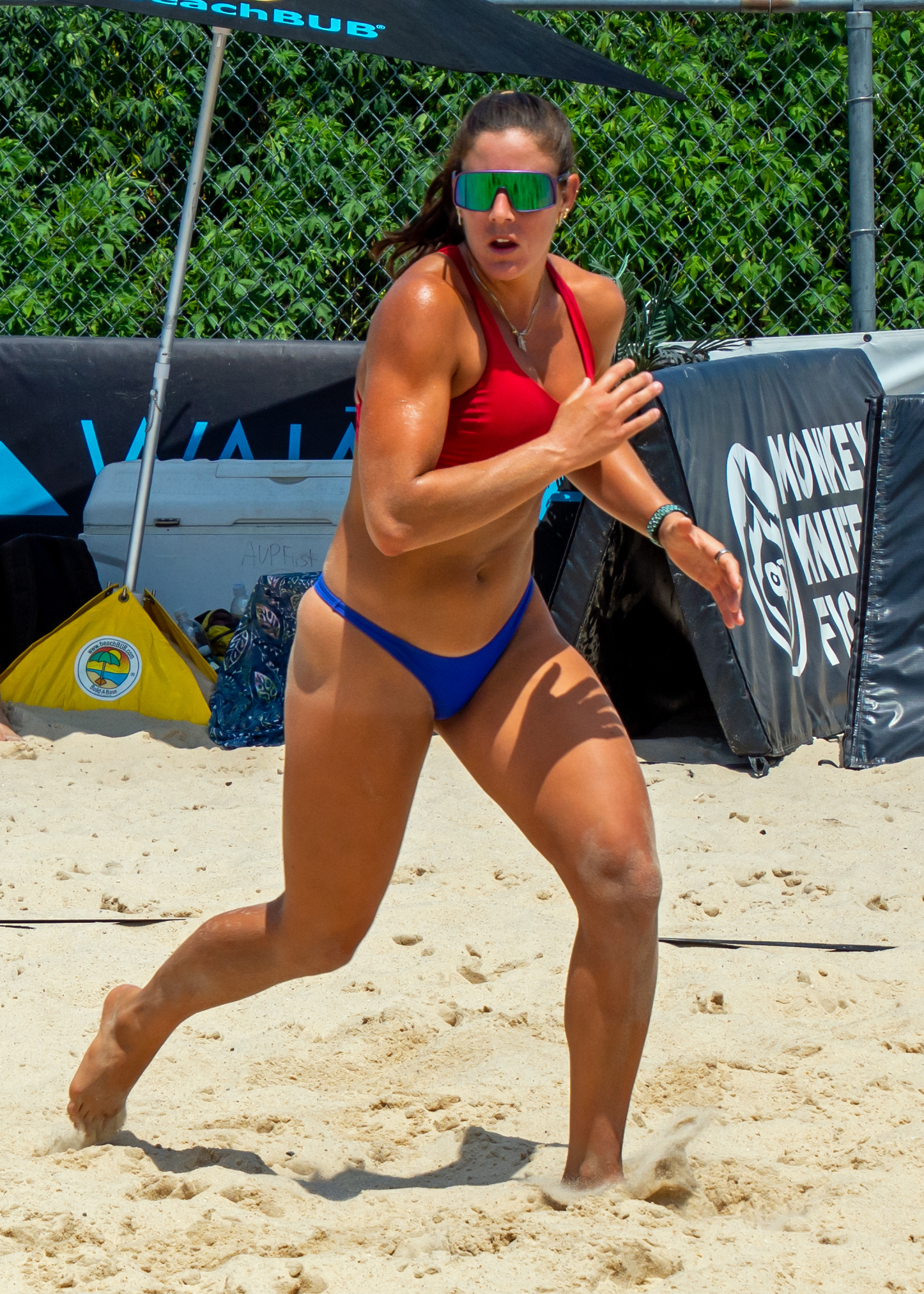
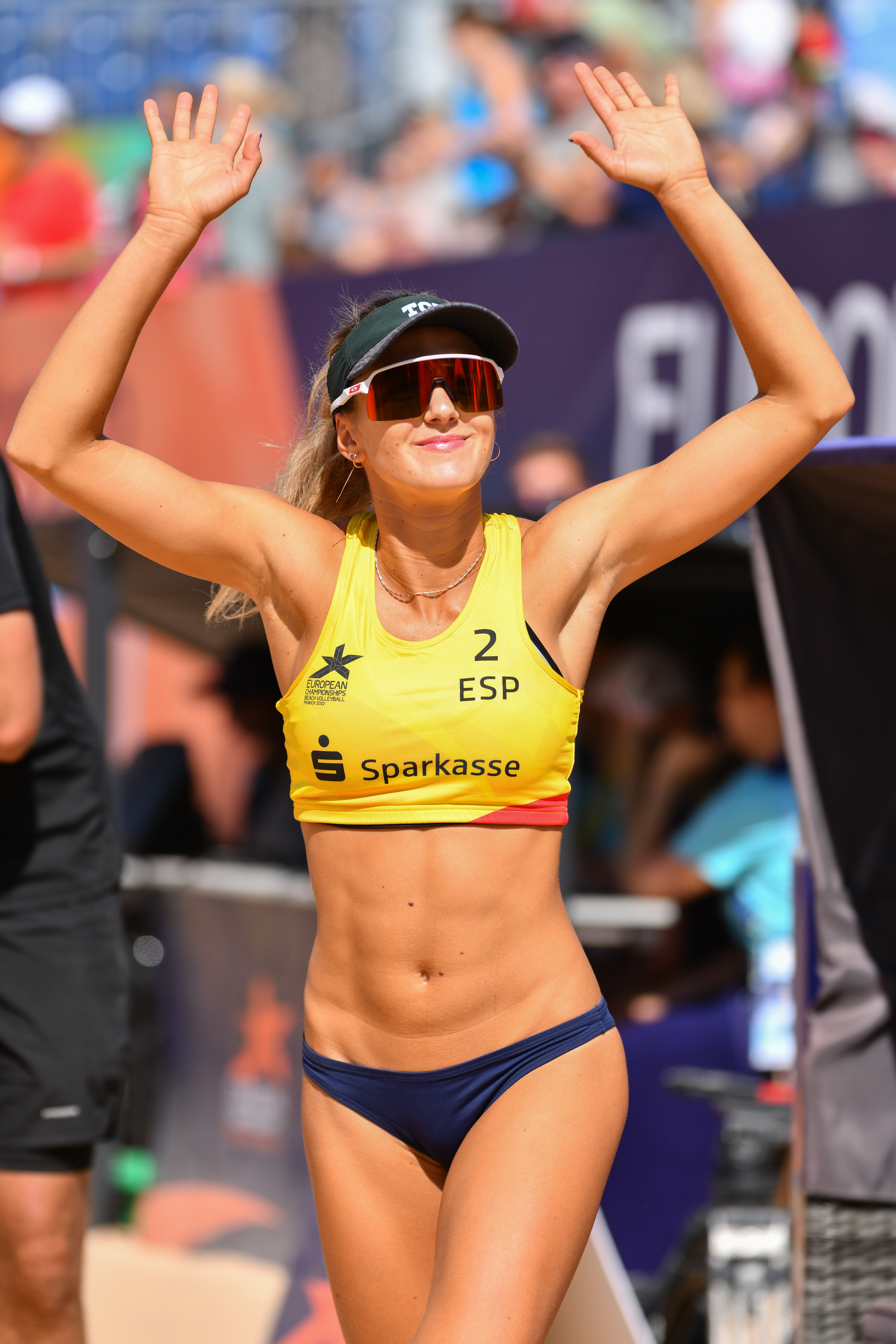
UCLA's Lexy Denaburg (left, pictured in 2022) and TCU's Tania Moreno (pictured in 2022) were returning AVCA first-team All-Americans for their teams.

From its inception in 2016 to 2022, only two teams had won the NCAA Beach Volleyball Championship: the USC Trojans (four titles and two-time defending champion: 2016, 2017, 2021 and 2022) and the UCLA Bruins (two titles: 2018 and 2019). Both teams were in the running for the title once again in 2023. UCLA entered the NCAA tournament seeded No. 1 and topping the American Volleyball Coaches Association's (AVCA) rankings. Volleyball Magazine's Travis Mewhirter regarded the Bruins as the preseason favorites, writing that they had "the most loaded lineup in the country, top to bottom". Headed by Stein Metzger for the eleventh year, their senior-heavy roster featured nine returning starters from the team that took third-place at the previous NCAA championship, including 2022 AVCA first-team All-Americans Lexy Denaburg and Abby Van Winkle. The Bruins recorded 23 dual sweep victories in the regular season, and were coming off their third Pac-12 title despite being upset by Stanford earlier in the double-elimination tournament. In contrast to UCLA, Mewhirter considered USC somewhat of a preseason "underdog" due to the fact that they had lost all but four of last year's championship-winning lineup, and thus had a less experienced squad that relied on new transfers and freshmen. Among their returning players were the former U19 world champions Megan Kraft and Delaynie Maple. Led by Dain Blanton for the fourth year, the Trojans were ranked third in the country and received the No. 3 seed. They headed to the championship having failed to make it to the Pac-12 final for the first time in program history after losses to California and UCLA.

Seeded No. 2 and No. 4 respectively, the TCU Horned Frogs and Florida State Seminoles were looking to end the USC–UCLA dominance. Under coach Hector Gutierrez, TCU entered the tournament ranked second in the country, but had also been ranked as high as first for six weeks earlier in the season. Volleyball Magazine's Larry Hamel noted that the Horned Frogs' lineup had a lot of depth; their roster featured the 2021 U21 world champion Anhelina Khmil of Ukraine, as well as the returning AVCA first-team All-American Spanish pair of Daniela Alvarez and Tania Moreno who had finished fourth at the 2022 European Championships. The 2022–23 season saw TCU defeat six-time defending conference champion Florida State en route to their first-ever Coastal Collegiate Sports Association (CCSA) title. Meanwhile, the three-time national runners-up Seminoles were ranked fourth, with Coach Brooke Niles's program featuring seven returning starters from the previous year. Despite losing five of their last ten duals, Volleyball Magazine still regarded Florida State as a strong contender for the NCAA title.

Julie Cribbs, chairperson of the NCAA Women's Beach Volleyball Committee, believed that moving the tournament from a double-elimination to single-elimination format could help disrupt the dominance of the sport's perennial powerhouses. With the top-four ranked teams all heading into the championship having suffered recent upsets, Volleyball Magazine's Lee Feinswog noted the new format "gave the top teams reason to pause and the next group reason to hope".

== Bracket ==
The tournament bracket is as follows:

Play-in; Wednesday, May 3
16	UT Martin	0
17	A&M–Corpus Christi	3

First round Friday, May 5 (Note: Due to inclement weather on Friday, May 5, the Hawaii–Loyola Marymount dual was played on Saturday, May 6 instead.)
1	UCLA	3
17	A&M–Corpus Christi	0
8	California	3
9	Long Beach State	2
5	LSU	3
12	Florida Atlantic	2
4	Florida State	3
13	FIU	1
14	Georgia State	0
3	USC	3
11	Hawaii	1
6	Loyola Marymount	3
10	Stanford	3
7	Grand Canyon	2
15	Stetson	0
2	TCU	3

Quarterfinals; Saturday, May 6
1	UCLA	3
8	California	1
5	LSU	0
4	Florida State	3
3	USC	3
6	Loyola Marymount	1
10	Stanford	0
2	TCU	3

Semifinals; Saturday, May 6
1	UCLA	3
4	Florida State	0
3	USC	3
2	TCU	2

Championship; Sunday, May 7
1	UCLA	2
3	USC	3

== Dual summaries ==
=== Play-in ===
The competition began with the play-in dual between the No. 16 seed UT Martin and the No. 17 seed A&M–Corpus Christi, in what was the first-ever matchup between the two teams. The dual was played in staggered flights, with the No. 2 and No. 4 pairs playing their matches first, followed by the No. 1, No. 3, and No. 5 pairs playing theirs to decision. A&M–Corpus Christi won the first two pairs matches in straight sets, giving them a 2–0 dual lead. In the next round of matches, they were up a set on all three courts before their No. 3 pairing of Jade Bennett and Tori Johnson clinched the dual with a dominant 21–9, 21–10 match win, giving the program its first-ever dual victory at the championship.

=== First round ===
The start of the sixteen-team single-elimination bracket on Friday was marked by rain delays and strong winds. In the first matchup of the day, UCLA recorded their 24th dual sweep of the season by beating A&M–Corpus Christi 3–0 with pair wins on courts No. 1, No. 2 and No. 4. Inclement weather delayed the subsequent matches and the last dual scheduled for the day (Hawaii–Loyola Marymount) was postponed to the following morning instead.

== Post-tournament honors and records ==
=== All-Tournament Team ===
The following pairs were named to the NCAA All-Tournament Team:

Pair	School	Player 1	Player 2
No. 1	UCLA	Lexy Denaburg	Maggie Boyd
No. 2	TCU	Kate Privet	Anhilina Khmil
No. 3	USC	Audrey Nourse	Nicole Nourse
No. 4	USC	Ashlyn Rasnick-Pope	Jenna Johnson
No. 5	UCLA	Devon Newberry	Jaden Whitmarsh

=== Individual match records ===
The following individual match records were set. (Note: A "kill" is an attack that directly scores a point. "Hitting percentage" is the number of kills minus the number of errors, divided by the number of attempts. A "dig" is a defensive play that stops an opponent's attack from being grounded. A "service ace" is a serve that directly scores a point. A "block" is a defensive play that stops an opponent's attack from crossing the net.)

- Most kills: 29 by Kelly Belardi in Stanford vs. TCU on May 6
- Highest hitting percentage: .813 by Haley Hallgren in UCLA vs. A&M Corpus Christi on May 5
- Most digs: 28 (tie)
  - Kelly Belardi in Stanford vs. TCU on May 6
  - Ashley Delgado in California vs. UCLA on May 6
- Most service aces: 6 (tie)
  - Ashlyn Rasnick-Pope in Southern California vs. Loyola Marymount on May 6
  - Delayne Maple in Southern California vs. Loyola Marymount on May 6
  - Hailey Brockett in TCU vs. Stetson on May 5
  - Noelle Weinbtraub in Stetson vs. TCU on May 5
  - Brooke Birch in Grand Canyon vs. Stanford on May 5
  - Gabrielle Walker in Southern California vs. Georgia State on May 5
- Most blocks: 6 (tie)
  - Ashley Vincent in Stanford vs. Grand Canyon on May 5
  - Anna Long in Florida State vs. FIU on May 5

=== Other records ===
The UCLA pairing of Lexy Denaburg and Maggie Boyd tied the all-time record for most tournament wins by a pair with four wins. UCLA also set the tournament record for total pair wins by a team with 11 wins.

== Broadcast and attendance ==
The first round duals on May 5, 2023, were broadcast live on ESPNU; the quarterfinal and semifinal duals, as well as the rescheduled Hawaii–Loyola Marymount first round dual, on May 6 were broadcast live on ESPN2; the championship dual on May 7 was broadcast live on ESPN. Additionally, all individual matches were livestreamed on ESPN+.

The ESPN broadcast of the UCLA–USC championship dual was watched by 380,000 viewers, while the ESPN2 broadcasts of the Florida State–UCLA and TCU–USC semifinals were watched by 107,000 and 117,000 viewers respectively. Of the ESPN2 quarterfinal broadcasts, the most-watched duals were Stanford–TCU (145,000 viewers) and Florida State–LSU (131,000 viewers). According to ESPN, viewership of the tournament as a whole increased 100% from the previous year. The tournament was also attended by a live audience of 11,667.
