= 2024 NCAA Beach Volleyball Championship =

Intercollegiate beach volleyball tournament

- Logo
- Season: 2024 NCAA beach volleyball season
- Teams: 17
- Format: Single-elimination
- Finals site: Gulf Place Public Beach; Gulf Shores, Alabama
- Champions: USC Trojans (6th title)
- Runner-up: UCLA Bruins
- Winning coach: Dain Blanton (4th title)
- Television: ESPN networks

The 2024 NCAA Beach Volleyball Championship (officially the 2024 National Collegiate Beach Volleyball Championship) was an intercollegiate tournament to determine the National Collegiate Athletic Association (NCAA) women's beach volleyball national champion for the 2023–24 season. The eighth edition of the tournament was held from May 3 to 5, 2024, at Gulf Place Public Beach in Gulf Shores, Alabama. The 2024 championship featured a single-elimination-only bracket for the second time, along with an expanded 17-team field. Nine of the participating schools automatically qualified by winning their respective conference tournaments, while the other eight were given at-large bids by the NCAA Women's Beach Volleyball Committee. The tournament was broadcast on ESPN, ESPN2, and ESPNU.

== Background ==
The National Collegiate Athletic Association (NCAA) began sponsoring women's beach volleyball as a championship sport in 2016, and the sport has since experienced rapid growth at the collegiate level, with a 500 percent increase in women's collegiate beach volleyball programs in the United States from 2011 to 2020. The NCAA Beach Volleyball Championship is the tournament held at the end of every regular season to determine the women's national collegiate champion across all NCAA divisions. It has been held annually since the inaugural 2016 event, (Note: Except in 2020 when the championship was canceled due to the COVID-19 pandemic.) and 2023 marked its seventh edition. The 2023 tournament was held in Gulf Shores, Alabama, the same venue that hosted all six previous championships, and was co-hosted by Gulf Shores Orange Beach Sports & Events, the city of Gulf Shores, and the University of Alabama at Birmingham. (Note: Before the NCAA-sanctioned championship, the American Volleyball Coaches Association (AVCA) also hosted a national championship for collegiate beach volleyball at the same Gulf Shores venue from 2012 to 2015.)

Popularized on the beaches of California in the 1920s, beach volleyball is a sport played by two teams on a sand court. At the professional level, teams consist of a pair of players who compete in best-of-three-set matches, where the first two sets are played to 21 points and the third set, if necessary, is played to 15 points; each set must be won by a minimum two-point lead. Conversely, NCAA beach volleyball is played using a flighted team-dual format. In an NCAA dual, each team fields five individual pairs who are ranked from No. 1 to No. 5 by skill level, and each pair plays a flighted best-of-three-set match against their corresponding pair on the other team. The first team to win three of the five pairs' matches wins the dual.

The NCAA Beach Volleyball Championship had historically been an eight-team double-elimination tournament, in which all participating teams were selected by the NCAA Women's Beach Volleyball Committee. However, with the growing popularity of the collegiate sport, the NCAA agreed to double the field for the 2022 championship, adding a 16-team opening knockout round that led into the established eight-team double-elimination bracket. Along with the expanded field, the qualification process introduced eight automatic bids that teams earned by winning their respective conference tournaments. Further changes were adopted for 2023, with the tournament becoming a single-elimination-only event, and the field expanded to 17 teams to allow for nine automatic qualifiers.

== Format and venue ==
The 2024 NCAA Beach Volleyball Championship is a 17-team tournament that was held from May 3 to 5, 2024. The tournament began on Friday, May 3, with a play-in dual between the two lowest seeded teams. The 16-team single-elimination main bracket also began on Friday, May 3, with the winning teams advancing to the quarterfinals and semifinals on Saturday, May 4, until a national champion was determined on Sunday, May 5.

The tournament took place on one site at the Gulf Place Public Beach in Gulf Shores, which had been set up with five playing courts and five practice courts. Over the years, the playing conditions at the Gulf Shores venue have been characterized by several factors; namely the compact sand that makes it easier for players to move and jump, the strong winds, and the possibility of rain during that time of the year.

== Participating teams ==
Of the 93 eligible NCAA teams, a total of 17 qualified for the tournament and were seeded from No. 1 to No. 17. Nine of the teams earned automatic bids by winning their respective conference tournaments. The remaining eight bids were allocated at large by the NCAA Women's Beach Volleyball Committee. The qualifying teams and seeding order were announced by the committee on April 28, 2024.

=== Automatic bids ===
The following nine teams earned automatic bids by winning their conference tournaments.

| Team | Conference | Date qualified | Win–loss record | Appearance | Last bid | Ref |
|---|---|---|---|---|---|---|
| Hawaii | Big West | April 26, 2024 | 29–6 | 7th | 2023 | |
| North Florida | ASUN | April 27, 2024 | 24–11 | 1st | – | |
| Texas A&M-Corpus Christi | Southland | April 21, 2024 | 28–9 | 3rd | 2023 | |
| Loyola Marymount | West Coast | April 26, 2024 | 27–13 | 4th | 2023 | |
| USC | Pac-12 | April 26, 2024 | 33–5 | 8th | 2023 | |
| TCU | C-USA | April 27, 2024 | 29–7 | 4th | 2023 | |
| Georgia State | Sun Belt | April 27, 2024 | 26–12 | 4th | 2023 | |
| Florida State | CCSA | April 27, 2024 | 30–7 | 8th | 2023 | |
| Chattanooga | Ohio Valley | April 27, 2024 | 19–9 | 1st | – | |

=== At-large bids ===
The following eight teams were allocated at-large bids by the NCAA selection committee.

| Team | Conference | Win–loss record | Appearance | Last bid | Ref |
|---|---|---|---|---|---|
| UCLA | Pac-12 | 32–6 | 8th | 2023 | |
| Stanford | Pac-12 | 31–5 | 4th | 2023 | |
| California | Pac-12 | 21–13 | 3rd | 2023 | |
| Arizona State | Pac-12 | 21–9 | 1st | – | |
| Washington | Pac-12 | 20–15 | 1st | – | |
| Cal Poly | Big West | 29–6 | 4th | 2022 | |
| LSU | CCSA | 25–11 | 7th | 2023 | |
| Long Beach State | Big West | 28–9 | 3rd | 2023 | |

=== Preview ===
From its inception in 2016 to 2023, only two teams had won the NCAA Beach Volleyball Championship: the USC Trojans (five titles and two-time defending champion: 2016, 2017, 2021, 2022 and 2023) and the UCLA Bruins (two titles: 2018 and 2019). Both teams are in the running for the title once again in 2024. USC entered the NCAA tournament seeded No. 1 and topping the American Volleyball Coaches Association's (AVCA) rankings.

== Bracket ==
The tournament bracket is as follows:

Opening round Friday, May 3
16 | North Florida | 3
17 | Chattanooga | 0

First round Friday, May 3
1 | USC | 3
16 | North Florida | 0
8 | Loyola Marymount | 3
9 | Hawaii | 1
5 | Cal Poly | 3
12 | Arizona State | 0
4 | Florida State | 3
13 | Washington | 1
14 | Georgia State | 0
3 | Stanford | 3
11 | LSU | 3
6 | TCU | 2
10 | Long Beach State | 1
7 | California | 3
15 | Texas A&M-Corpus Christi | 0
2 | UCLA | 3

Quarterfinals; Saturday, May 4
1 | USC | 3
8 | Loyola Marymount | 0
5 | Cal Poly | 3
4 | Florida State | 1
3 | Stanford | 2
11 | LSU | 3
7 | California | 0
2 | UCLA | 3

Semifinals; Saturday, May 4
1 | USC | 3
5 | Cal Poly | 0
11 | LSU | 1
2 | UCLA | 3

Championship; Sunday, May 5
1 | USC | 3
2 | UCLA | 0

== Dual summaries ==
=== Opening Round ===
==== No. 16 North Florida v. No. 17 Chattanooga ====
T. Pierce/M. Rezentez (UNF) def. N. Clarke/C.Vale (UTC): 21–14, 21–16

P. Murray/M. Espy (UNF) def. G. Finch/M. Faychak (UTC): 21–13, 21–14

C. Humphries/H. Wooldrige (UNF) def. K. Gresham/P.Gallentine (UTC): 21–13, 21–10

=== First Round ===
==== No. 1 USC v. No. 16 North Florida ====
A. Nourse/N. Nourse (USC) def. K. Camp/I. Fletcher (UNF): 21–14, 21–16

A. Pater/G. Seits (USC) def. C. Humphries/H. Wooldrige (UNF): 21–14, 21–8

M. Kriz/M. White (USC) def. P. Murray/M. Espy (UNF): 21–17, 21–18

==== No. 2 UCLA v. No. 15 Texas A&M – Corpus Christi ====
M. Boyd/L. Denaburg (UCLA) def. C. Dodd/C.Tome (AMCC): 21–16, 24–22

J. Smith/K. Brower (UCLA) def. H. Doyle/S. Young (AMCC): 21–14, 21–13

N. Myszkowski/E. Alden (UCLA) def. E. Cortez/K. Moreno (AMCC): 21–15, 21–17

==== No. 3 Stanford v. No 14 Georgia State ====
B. Rockwell/X. Hodel (STAN) def. A. Ferary/B. Ferary (GSU): 21–9, 21–18

T. Wilson/R. Sorra (STAN) def. L. Bordis/A. Keller (GSU): 21–17, 21–17

K. Belardi/C. Hoffman (STAN) def. S. Ebarb/D. White (GSU): 21–19, 21–15

==== No. 4 Florida State v. 13 Washington ====
M. Anderson/A. Durish (FSU) def. M. Rabitsch/P. Monk-Heidrich (UW): 19–21 21–15 15–11

Z. Henson/L. Wilcock (UW) def. A. Hansen/A. Long (FSU): 21–16 20–22 15–13

R. White/A. Koenig (FS) def. K. Mather/K. Barton (UW): 21–16 21–17

S. Germann/M. Chacon (FSU) def. S. Dahl/N. Martin (UW): 21–14 22–20

==== No. 5 Cal Poly v. No. 12 Arizona State ====
E. Connor/I. Martinez (CP) def. D. Kensinger/A. Williamson (ASU): 21–18, 21–19

P. Ferch/E. Inskepp (CP) def. A. Besecker/A. Pemberton (ASU): 21–14, 21–10

Q. Perry/L. Sparks (CP) def. T. Ames/L. Sweeney (ASU): 22–20, 21–16

==== No. 6 TCU v. No. 11 LSU ====
H. Hamlett/A. Khmil (TCU) def. G. Bailey/E. Shank (LSU): 21–17 21–18

S. Martin/A. Haynes (LSU) def. M. Williams/T. Patton (TCU): 17–21 21–17 15–9

P. Bracken/R. Allred (LSU) def. S. MacTavish/A. Parkhurst (TCU): 21–15 16–21 16–14

A. Namike/O. Clines (TCU) def. E. Meyer/Y. Ashush (LSU): 17–21 21–16 15–11

E. Larkin/A. O’Gorman (LSU) def. E. Glagau/A. Vergara (TCU): 20–22 23–21 15–12

==== No. 7 California v. No. 10 Long Beach State ====
M. Gementera/T. Hagenah (LBSU) def. S. Caffo/A. Young-Gomez (CAL): 24–22, 21–16

E. Donley/K. Peters (CAL) def. M. Gibson/S. Standage (LBSU): 21–17, 21–9

P. Sherman/J. Colligan (CAL) def. M. Widener/C. Deroos (LBSU): 21–18, 13–21, 15–10

E. Dreibholz/L. Boos (CAL) def. H. Carrington/E. Sparks (LBSU): 21–11, 21–6

==== No. 8 Loyola Marymount v. No. 9 Hawaii ====
V. Prihti/M. Shaffer (LMU) def. J. Santer/A. Embry (UH): 21–18, 21–11

K. Glagau/P. Napoleon (UH) def. I. Reffel/A. Stevens (LMU): 21–17, 21–13

A. Pelloia/J. Ramirez (LMU) def. A. Maidment/S. Miller (UH): 21–16, 21–15

A. Thorup/M. Firnett (LMU) def. J. Thelle/S. Burton (UH): 21–10, 21–15

=== Quarterfinals ===
==== No. 1 USC v. No. 8 Loyola Marymount ====
M. Kraft/D. Maple(USC) def. V. Prihti/M. Shaffer(LMU): 21–10, 21–9

M. Kriz/M. White(USC) def. I. Reffel/A. Stevens (LMU): 21–17, 21–12

M. Goellner/M. Thomas (USC) def. M. Firnett/A. Thorup (LMU): 21–15, 21–16

==== No. 2 UCLA v. No. 7 California ====
M.Boyd/L. Denaburg (UCLA) def. S. Caffo/A. Young-Gomez (CAL): 21–19 21–18

P. Brennan/D. Newberry (UCLA) def. E. Donley/K. Peters (CAL): 21–17 21–15

J. Smith/K. Brower (UCLA) def. G. Fisher/M. Pally (CAL): 21–13 21–17

==== No. 3 Stanford v. No. 11 LSU ====
B. Rockwell/X. Hodel (STAN) def. G. Bailey and E. Shank (LSU): 12–21 22–20 15–8

P. Bracken/R. Allred (LSU) def. T. Wilson/R. Sorra (STAN): 18–21 22–20 24–22

E. Larkin and A. O’Gorman (LSU) def. K. Belardi/C. Hoffman (STAN): 21–18 16–21 16–14

C. Stowell/K. Reilly (STAN) def. S. Martin/A. Haynes (LSU): 21–16 21–16

E. Meyer and Y. Ashush (LSU) def. M. Harvey/A. Vincent (STAN): 21–14 17–21 15–13

==== No. 4 Florida State v. No. 5 Cal Poly ====
M. Anderson/A. Durish (FSU) def. E. Connor/I. Martinez (CP): 22–20, 21–19

P. Ferch/E. Inskepp (CP) def. A. Hansen/A. Long (FSU): 21–17, 21–12

Q. Perry/L. Sparks (CP) def. R. White/A. Koenig (FSU): 21–11, 21–11

A. Reinard/M. Nichols (CP) def. C. Moon/K. Truslow (FSU): 22–20, 21–12

=== Semifinals ===
==== No. 1 USC v. No. 5 Cal Poly ====
M. Kraft/D. Maple (USC) def. E. Connor/I. Martinez (CP): 21–13, 21–16

A. Nourse/N. Nourse (USC) def. Q. Perry/L. Sparks (CP): 23–21, 21–17

A. Pater/G. Seits (USC) def. P. Naess/L. Walter (CP): 21–17, 28–26

==== No. 2 UCLA v. No. 11 LSU ====
M. Boyd/L. Denaburg (UCLA) def. G. Bailey/E. Shank (LSU): 21–19 21–14

P. Bracken/R. Allred (LSU) def. P. Brennan/D. Newberry (UCLA): 23–21 21–18

J. Smith/K. Brower (UCLA) def. E. Larkin/A. O’Gorman (LSU): 21–19 21–19

J. Whitmarsh and T. Van Winkle (UCLA) def. S. Martin/A. Haynes (LSU): 21–9 21–11

=== Championship ===
==== No. 1 USC v. No 2. UCLA ====
M. White/M. Kriz (USC) def. P. Brennan/D. Newberry (UCLA): 21–14, 19–21, 15–13

A. Nourse/N. Nourse (USC) def. J. Smith/K. Brower (UCLA): 22–20, 15–21, 15–11

A. Pater/G. Seits (USC) def. J. Whitmarsh/T. Van Winkle (UCLA): 24–26, 25–23, 15–8

== Record by conference ==
Overview of conference performance in the 2024 NCAA beach volleyball tournament
| Conference | Bids | Record | Win % | Opening round | First round | Quarterfinals | Semifinals | Championship dual | National champion |
|---|---|---|---|---|---|---|---|---|---|
| Pac-12 | 6 | 9–5 | .643 | – | 6 | 4 | 2 | 2 | 1 |
| CCSA | 2 | 3–2 | .600 | – | 2 | 2 | 1 | – | – |
| Big West | 3 | 2–3 | .400 | – | 3 | 1 | 1 | – | – |
| WCC | 1 | 1–1 | .500 | – | 1 | 1 | – | – | – |
| ASUN | 1 | 1–1 | .500 | 1 | 1 | – | – | – | – |
| C-USA | 1 | 0–1 | .000 | – | 1 | – | – | – | – |
| Southland | 1 | 0–1 | .000 | – | 1 | – | – | – | – |
| Sun Belt | 1 | 0–1 | .000 | – | 1 | – | – | – | – |
| Ohio Valley | 1 | 0–1 | .000 | 1 | – | – | – | – | – |

== Broadcast and attendance ==
The first round duals on May 3, 2024, will be broadcast live on ESPNU and ESPN+. The first round matchups will all be featured on ESPNU and ESPN+. The quarterfinal and semifinal matchups will be aired on ESPN2 and ESPN+. The National Championship matchup on May 5, 2024, will be played on ESPN and ESPN+.
