= 2021 NCAA Beach Volleyball Championship =

- Season: 2021 NCAA Beach Volleyball season
- Teams: 8
- Format: Double-elimination until championship
- Finals site: Gulf Shores Public Beach; Gulf Shores, Alabama
- Champions: USC Trojans (3rd title)
- Runner-up: UCLA Bruins (3rd title game)
- Winning coach: Dain Blanton (1st title)
- Television: ESPN

The 2021 NCAA Beach Volleyball Championship was held from May 7 through May 9, 2021 in Gulf Shores, Alabama as the final part of the 2021 NCAA Beach Volleyball season. It was the fifth edition of the NCAA Beach Volleyball Championship that began in 2016. The top-seeded UCLA Bruins are back-to-back defending champions, having won in 2018 and 2019. All divisions of the NCAA are eligible to compete in the Beach Volleyball Championship, however, all teams through the 2021 Championship have been Division I members. USC won the title.

== Participants ==
Participants
| Seed | Team | Conference | Record (before NCAA) | Appearance |
|---|---|---|---|---|
| 1 | UCLA | Pac-12 | 28–3 | 5th |
| 2 | USC | Pac-12 | 26–4 | 5th |
| 3 | Florida State | CCSA | 32–4 | 5th |
| 4 | LSU | CCSA | 25–7 | 4th |
| 5 | Loyola Marymount | WCC | 29–6 | 1st |
| 6 | Stanford | Pac-12 | 23–11 | 1st |
| 7 | Cal Poly | Big West | 23–9 | 2nd |
| 8 | TCU | CCSA | 26–8 | 1st |

== Bracket ==
Matches 1–4; Friday, May 7 | Matches 7–8; Friday, May 7 | Match 11; Saturday, May 8 | Championship; Match 14; Sunday, May 9
1 | UCLA | 3
8 | TCU | 0
1 | UCLA | 2
5 | LMU (CA) | 3
5 | LMU (CA) | 3
4 | LSU | 2
5 | LMU (CA) | 1
2 | USC | 3
3 | Florida State | 3
6 | Stanford | 0
3 | Florida State | 1
2 | USC | 3
7 | Cal Poly | 0
2 | USC | 3 | 2 | USC | 3
1 | UCLA | 1
Lower round 1 | Lower round 2 | Lower round 3 | Lower final
3 | Florida State | 1
8 | TCU | 1 | 4 | LSU | 3 | 5 | LMU (CA) | 0
4 | LSU | 3 | 4 | LSU | 2 | 1 | UCLA | 3
1 | UCLA | 3
7 | Cal Poly | 0
6 | Stanford | 2 | 1 | UCLA | 3
7 | Cal Poly | 3

Bracket source:

== All-Tournament Team ==
At the conclusion of the championship, five pairs (selected from all teams in the field) were honored as members of the All-Tournament Team.

| Court | Pair | Team | Record | Notes |
|---|---|---|---|---|
| 1 | Tina Graudina/Megan Kraft | USC | 4–0 | |
| 2 | Julia Scoles/Sammy Slater | USC | 4–0 | |
| 3 | Molly McBain/Payton Caffrey | FSU | 2–0 | 1 other match was left unfinished |
| 4 | Jacinda Ramirez/Darby Dunn | LMU | 2–0 | 2 other matches were left unfinished |
| 5 | Jaden Whitmarsh/Rileigh Powers | UCLA | 4–1 | 1 other match was left unfinished |
