= Angelica Ljungqvist =

Swedish volleyball player and coach

Personal information
- Full name: Angelica Elsa Birgitta Ljungqvist
- Nationality: Sweden
- Born: 20 December 1974 (age 51)
- Hometown: Vallentuna, Sweden
- Height: 6 ft 3 in (191 cm)
- Education: Hawai'i

Volleyball information
- Position: Middle blocker / Middle hitter

Angelica Elsa Birgitta Ljungqvist (formerly Angelica Ljungquist, born 20 December 1974) is a Swedish former volleyball player and coach, both at the amateur and professional level. She was also the associate coach for the women's volleyball team at the University of Hawaii at Manoa.

== Early years ==
Ljungqvist was born 20 December 1974, to Ann-Britt and Leif Ljungqvist. She grew up in Vallentuna, Sweden, and graduated from Vallentuna Gymnasium (Stockholm, Sweden) in 1993.

== College ==
Ljungqvist came to Hawai'i to play volleyball for the Rainbow Wahines in 1993. She came to play for coach Dave Shoji, who already had national championships in 1979 (AIAW), 1982, 1983, and 1987 (NCAA). She was talented enough to be named to All-American teams as a freshman, but Shoji could always find areas needing improvement. Ljungquist had difficulty getting her left hand over the net, so Shoji asked her how to say "left" in Swedish. She told him the word is "vänster", so after that he would remonstrate "vänster, vänster hand".

She not only made the All-American 2nd Team as a freshman, she made All-American team all four years, the first player from Hawai'i to earn such a distinction. In 1996, she helped lead the team to the title game of the 1996 NCAA Division I women's volleyball tournament. She was named to the All- Tournament team. Ljungquist was named the Player of the Year in volleyball by the NCAA in 1996. She was also named Player of the Year by Volleyball Magazine, and the AVCA in 1996.

In 1997, Ljungqvist won the Honda Award (now the Honda Sports Award) as the nation's best female volleyball player.

== National team ==
Ljungqvist played for Swedish National teams, the Swedish Indoor National Team from 1992 to 2006, and the Swedish Beach National Team from 2002 to 2003 and 2007–10.

== Professional teams ==
She played professionally on several teams in Europe, as well as Brazil, and Japan. She started her pro career indoors in Brazil in 1998, then in Turkey in 1999, then played for teams in Italy in 2000 and 2001 including Famili Imola in northern Italy.

== Coaching ==
Angelica Ljungqvist
Playing career
- 1993–1996: Hawaii
- Position: Middle blocker

Coaching career (HC unless noted)

Indoor volleyball
- 2017–2021: Hawaii (associate)

Beach volleyball
- 2020–2021: Hawaii

Head coaching record
- Overall: 17–10 (.630) (beach)

Accomplishments and honors

Awards
- Honda Sports Award (1997)

When her college teammate, Robyn Ah Mow-Santos, was hired by the Rainbow Wahine to be the new head coach of the volleyball team, one of the first people she contacted was Ljungqvist. Ah Mow-Santos instant messaged Ljungqvist even before she was offered the job, and asked Ljungqvist to be on her staff. Ljungqvist initially thought she was joking, but after realizing it was a serious request, agreed to join the coaching staff. She finished her law degree in Sweden, then returned to Hawai'i to become a coach.

Ljungqvist was also named the head coach for the university's beach volleyball team in August 2020 after the indoor and beach programs merged in a financial decision stemming from the COVID-19 pandemic. Ljungqvist departed Hawaii in July 2021, citing family reasons.

=== Head coaching record ===
Record table
Season	Team	Overall	Conference	Standing	Postseason
Hawaii BeachBows (Big West Conference) (2021)
2021	Hawaii	17–10			
Hawaii:		17–10 (.630)			
Total:		17–10 (.630)			
National champion Postseason invitational champion Conference regular season champion Conference regular season and conference tournament champion Division regular season champion Division regular season and conference tournament champion Conference tournament champion
