= South Carolina Gamecocks women's volleyball =

Volleyball team of the University of South Carolina

South Carolina Gamecocks
- University: University of South Carolina
- Head coach: Sarah Rumely Noble (2nd season)
- Conference: SEC
- Location: Columbia, South Carolina, US
- Home arena: Volleyball Competition Center (capacity: 2,000)
- Nickname: Gamecocks
- Colors: Garnet and black

AIAW/NCAA second round
- 1995, 1997, 2000, 2002, 2018, 2019

AIAW/NCAA tournament appearance
- 1984, 1995, 1997, 1998, 2000, 2001, 2002, 2018, 2019, 2021, 2024

Conference tournament champion
- Metro Conference: 1984

The South Carolina Gamecocks women's volleyball is the team that represents the University of South Carolina in NCAA Division I college volleyball. They play their home matches at the Volleyball Competition Center, which sits adjacent to the Carolina Coliseum. Quick facts on the facility include: Cost to Build: $4.6 Million Year Opened: 1996 Seating Capacity: 1,600 Attendance Record: 2,041 (Sept. 4, 2016 vs Clemson)

== Head coaches ==
Name	Years	Seasons	Won	Lost	Pct.
Violet Meade	1973	1	10	8	.556
Vicki Hamilton	1974–1975	2	20	23	.465
Kathy Graham	1976–1977	2	68	23	.747
Judy Martino	1978–1980	3	53	50	.515
Terrie Drake	1981–1982	2	26	48	.351
Elaine Mozingo	1983	1	34	4	.895
Bonnie Kenny	1984–1992	9	171	137	.555
Kim Hudson	1993–2004	12	226	133	.630
Nancy Somera	2005–2006	2	28	31	.475
Ben Somera	2007–2010	4	56	63	.471
Scott Swanson	2011–2017	5	104	111	.484
Tom Mendoza	2018–2024	7	106	90	.540
Sarah Rumely Noble	2025-present	1	10	16	.385
All-Time		51	912	737	.553

== Year-by-year results ==
Year	Head coach	Overall record	Conference record	Conference standing	Postseason
(Association for Intercollegiate Athletics for Women (AIAW)) (1973–1982)
1973	Violet Meade	10–8	-	-	-
1974	Vicki Hamilton	10–11	-	-	-
1975	Vicki Hamilton	10–12	-	-	-
1976	Kathy Graham	21–14	-	-	-
1977	Kathy Graham	47–9	-	-	-
1978	Judy Martino	36–11	-	-	-
1979	Judy Martino	8–18	-	-	-
1980	Judy Martino	9–21	-	-	-
1981	Terrie Drake	13–23	-	-	-
1982	Terrie Drake	13–25	-	-	-
(Metro) (1983–1990)
1983	Elaine Mozingo	34–4	6–1	-	-
1984	Bonnie Kenny	28–8	5–2	-	NCAA 1st Round
1985	Bonnie Kenny	18–17	5–1	-	-
1986	Bonnie Kenny	24–11	5–1	-	-
1987	Bonnie Kenny	15–15	3–3	-	-
1988	Bonnie Kenny	24–12	4–2	-	-
1989	Bonnie Kenny	15–15	3–4	-	-
1990	Bonnie Kenny	23–14	3–4	-	-
(SEC) (1991–present)
1991	Bonnie Kenny	13–24	1–13	-	-
1992	Bonnie Kenny	11–21	1–13	-	-
1993	Kim Hudson	15–18	4–10	-	-
1994	Kim Hudson	24–12	8–6	-	-
1995	Kim Hudson	21–11	8–6	-	NCAA 2nd Round
1996	Kim Hudson	22–8	10–4	-	-
1997	Kim Hudson	21–8	11–3	-	NCAA 2nd Round
1998	Kim Hudson	21–11	8–6	-	NCAA 1st Round
1999	Kim Hudson	14–12	8–6	-	-
2000	Kim Hudson	22–7	12–2	-	NCAA 2nd Round
2001	Kim Hudson	20–6	10–4	-	NCAA 1st Round
2002	Kim Hudson	22–7	14–2	-	NCAA 2nd Round
2003	Kim Hudson	12–18	6–10	-	-
2004	Kim Hudson	12–15	5–11	-	-
2005	Nancy Somera	13–14	5–11	-	-
2006	Nancy Somera	15–17	8–12	-	-
2007	Ben Somera	14–15	7–13	-	-
2008	Ben Somera	21–9	12–8	-	-
2009	Ben Somera	14–16	5–15	-	-
2010	Ben Somera	7–23	4–16	-	-
2011	Scott Swanson	14–16	5–15	-	-
2012	Scott Swanson	18–14	6–14	-	-
2013	Scott Swanson	12–19	3–15	-	-
2014	Scott Swanson	17–14	7–11	-	-
2015	Scott Swanson	13–18	6–12	T-10th	-
2016	Scott Swanson	18–12	6–12	T-9th	-
2017	Scott Swanson	12–18	5–13	T-11th	-
2018	Tom Mendoza	20–10	10–8	T-5th	NCAA 2nd Round
2019	Tom Mendoza	20–12	11–7	6th	NCAA 2nd Round
2020	Tom Mendoza	12–10	12–10	6th	-
2021	Tom Mendoza	14–15	6–12	10th	NCAA 1st Round
2022	Tom Mendoza	13–15	7–11	T-9th	-
2023	Tom Mendoza	11–16	5–13	T-11th	-
2024	Tom Mendoza	16–12	7–9	T-8th	NCAA 1st Round
2025	Sarah Rumely Noble	10–16	4–11	T-13th	-
Total		912–737	281–362		

== See also ==
- South Carolina Gamecocks beach volleyball
- List of NCAA Division I women's volleyball programs
