= North Alabama Lions beach women's volleyball =

American college beach volleyball team

- Founded: 2019
- University: University of North Alabama
- Head coach: Kaleb VanDePerre (2nd season)
- Conference: ASUN
- Location: Florence, Alabama
- Home arena: UNA Beach Volleyball Courts
- Nickname: Lions

The North Alabama Lions beach women's volleyball team represents the University of North Alabama in the Atlantic Sun Conference. They are currently led by head coach Kaleb VanDePerre and play their home games at the UNA Beach Volleyball Courts.

== History ==
Beach volleyball was added as a sport at UNA in 2019. It was added along with women's golf to keep the amount of sports sponsored at 14 as both women's indoor and outdoor track programs were discontinued.

Bob White served as the first head coach of the program in 2019 as an addition to his duties as the indoor volleyball coach. In the inaugural season, the Lions won their first match in a faceoff against the Huntingdon Hawks. The Lions would also win their first ever home match against in-state rival Jacksonville State.

In 2021, assistant coach Thais Yancey took over as head coach and led UNA to its first ever winning season.

Before the 2023 season, Kaleb VanDePerre was brought on as the new head coach as Yancey returned to her previous position as assistant coach. VanDePerre, who was previously the head coach at Liberty University, was brought on in an effort to separate indoor and beach volleyball.

In 2023, the Lions earned their first 20-win season. They made it to the ASUN quarterfinals where they lost to North Florida. The year also saw the team's first All-ASUN First Team selection with the pair of Paula Klemperer and Taylor Seney.

In 2024, the team won their first ever matches against Power 5 programs. The Lions sweep the Oregon Ducks 5–0 in the Green Wave Invitational in New Orleans. They would also go on to sweep the Nebraska Cornhuskers in the Tiger Beach Classic in Baton Rouge.

2024 also saw the Lions set a new record for season wins as they finished 22–16. In the ASUN tournament, they made it to the semifinals before losing to FGCU.

The season also saw multiple honors awarded to the Lions. Coach VanDePerre won the ASUN Coach of the Year, which is the first time a coach at UNA has won the honor in the Division I era. Paula Klemperer and Taylor Seney was selected to the ASUN First Team for the second straight year. They were also joined by the pair of Katy Floyd and Selma Robinson.

== UNA Beach Volleyball Courts ==
The Lions play their home matches at the UNA Beach Volleyball Courts. The courts were added to Cox Creek Park by the University in Fall 2018 with arrival of the sport to the school's athletic programs.

The courts are adjacent to the Hilda B. Anderson Softball Complex, where the UNA softball team plays, and the Cox Creek Practice Field.

== Season-by-season results ==
Year	Head Coach	Overall record	Conference record	Conference standing	Postseason
Bob White (ASUN) (2019–2020)
2019	Bob White	10–12	4-4	6th	
2020	Bob White	5–7		4th	
Thais Yancey (ASUN) (2021–2022)
2021	Thais Yancey	12–10	0–2	4th	
2022	Thais Yancey	16–14	5-5	6th	
Kaleb VanDePerre (ASUN) (2023–present)
2023	Kaleb VanDePerre	20–16	7–3	4th	
2024	Kaleb VanDePerre	22–16	5–3	4th	
2025	Kaleb VanDePerre	18–15	7–4	4th	
Total		103–90	28-21		

== All-time records ==
=== Individual career wins ===
Records as of February 18, 2025

Player	Wins	Years Played
Paula Klemperer	83	2019–2024
Mackenzie Martin	81	2019–2024
Taylor Seney	74	2020–2024
Katy Floyd	67	2022–2024
Jelena Girod	60	2021–2024

=== Pair career wins ===
Records as of February 18, 2025

Pair	Wins	Years
Paula Klemperer/Taylor Seney	48	2022-24
Mackenzie Martin/Catie Ladner	27	2021-22
Natalie Kordt/Jelena Girod	25	2022-23
Katy Floyd/Selma Robinson	25	2024
Mackenzie Martin/Katy Floyd	22	2023
