= 2019 NCAA Beach Volleyball Championship =

Tournament details
- Dates: May 3–5, 2019
- Teams: 8

Final positions
- Champions: UCLA Bruins
- Runners-up: USC Trojans

Tournament statistics
- Matches played: 14

The 2019 NCAA Beach Volleyball Championship was the fourth annual tournament deciding the NCAA champions for the 2019 collegiate beach volleyball season. It took place May 3–5 in Gulf Shores, Alabama, and was hosted by the University of Alabama at Birmingham. It was a double elimination tournament, with a single championship match. The Bruins won their second championship in a row by defeating Southern Cal 3–0 in the championship match on May 5, 2019.

== Qualification ==
The tournament was open to teams from Divisions I, II, and III. The top three teams each in the East and West Regions qualified automatically, and two additional teams were selected at large. Selections for the tournament were announced on April 28 on NCAA.com.

Seed	Team	Record	Bid Type	Region	Appearance	Last Bid
2	UCLA	31–3	Automatic	West	Fourth	2018
4	Pepperdine	20–9	Automatic	West	Fourth	2018
7	Hawaii	26–9	At-large	West	Third	2018
3	Florida State	28–5	Automatic	East	Third	2018
1	USC	28–4	Automatic	West	Fourth	2018
8	Stetson	29–8	Automatic	East	Second	2016
5	LSU	29–6	Automatic	East	Third	2018
6	Cal Poly	25–10	At-large	West	First	Never

== Bracket ==
Matches 1–4; Friday, May 3	Matches 7–8; Friday, May 3	Match 11; Saturday, May 4	Championship; Match 14; Sunday, May 5
1	USC	1
8	Stetson	3
8	Stetson	2
5	LSU	3
4	Pepperdine	0
5	LSU	3
5	LSU	0
2	UCLA	3
3	Florida State	3
6	Cal Poly	0
3	Florida State	0
2	UCLA	3
2	UCLA	3
7	Hawaii	2	2	UCLA	3
1	USC	0
Lower round 1	Lower round 2	Lower round 3	Lower final
1	USC	3
1	USC	3	3	Florida State	1	1	USC	3
4	Pepperdine	0	1	USC	3	5	LSU	2
7	Hawaii	0
7	Hawaii	3
6	Cal Poly	0	8	Stetson	0
7	Hawaii	3

== All-Tournament Team ==
At the conclusion of the championship, five pairs (selected from all teams in the field) were honored as members of the All-Tournament Team.

Court	Pair	Team	Record	Notes
1	Abril Bustamante/Tina Graudina	USC	3–0	3 other matches were left unfinished
2	Darby Dunn/Sammee Thomas	Stetson	2–0	1 other match was left unfinished
3	Zana Muno/Abby Van Winkle	UCLA	4–0	
4	Hi'ilawe Huddleston/Kylin Loker	Hawai'i	3–1	
5	Izzy Carey/Lindsey Sparks	UCLA	3–0	1 other match was left unfinished

== Media Coverage ==
In December 2017, ESPN was awarded a 5-year contract to provide television coverage of the NCAA Women’s Beach Volleyball Championship, beginning with the 2018 season. In addition, the Selection Show for the championship tournament was broadcast on April 28 at NCAA.com.

=== Television channels ===
The 14 dual matches comprising the entirety of the championship were broadcast live on the following channels at the specified times:

- Day 1: Opening Rounds (Matches/Duals 1–8) – ESPNU, 9:00 AM – 5:00 PM CDT
- Day 2: Third Round (Match/Dual 11); Elimination Bracket: Second and Third Rounds (Matches/Duals 9–10, 12) – ESPN2 (later rebroadcast on ESPNU), 9:00 AM – 1:00 PM CDT
- Day 3: Semifinal/Elimination Bracket Final (Match/Dual 13) – ESPN2, 9:30 AM CDT
- Day 3: National Championship Final (Match/Dual 14) – ESPN, 1:00 PM CDT
- Day 3: Trophy Ceremony – ESPN3, 3:00 PM CDT
