= 2018 NCAA Beach Volleyball Championship =

Tournament details
- Dates: May 4–6, 2018
- Teams: 8

Final positions
- Champions: UCLA Bruins
- Runners-up: Florida State Seminoles

Tournament statistics
- Matches played: 14

The 2018 NCAA Beach Volleyball Championship was the third annual tournament deciding the NCAA champions for the 2018 collegiate beach volleyball season. It took place May 4–6 in Gulf Shores, Alabama, and was hosted by the University of Alabama at Birmingham. It was a double elimination tournament, with a single championship match.

== Qualification ==
The tournament was open to teams from Divisions I, II, and III. The top three teams each in the East and West Regions qualified automatically, and two additional teams were selected at large. Selections for the tournament were announced on April 29 on NCAA.com.

Team	Record	Bid Type	Region	Appearance	Last Bid
UCLA	35–3	Automatic	West	Third	2017
Pepperdine	24–3	Automatic	West	Third	2017
Hawaii	35–3	Automatic	West	Third	2017
Florida State	27–7	Automatic	East	Third	2017
USC	25–12	At-large	West	Third	2017
South Carolina	24–7	At-large	East	Second	2017
LSU	26–12	Automatic	East	Second	2017
FIU	22–10	Automatic	East	First	Never

== Bracket ==
Matches 1–4; Friday, May 4	Matches 7–8; Friday, May 4	Match 11; Saturday, May 5	Championship; Match 14; Sunday, May 6
1	UCLA	3
8	FIU	0
1	UCLA	1
4	Florida State	3
4	Florida State	3
5	USC	1
4	Florida State	3
3	Hawaii	2
3	Hawaii	3
6	South Carolina	0
3	Hawaii	3
2	Pepperdine	2
2	Pepperdine	3
7	LSU	0	4	Florida State	1
1	UCLA	3
Lower round 1	Lower round 2	Lower round 3	Lower final
2	Pepperdine	2
8	FIU	2	5	USC	3	3	Hawaii	2
5	USC	3	5	USC	1	1	UCLA	3
1	UCLA	3
7	LSU	0
6	South Carolina	1	1	UCLA	3
7	LSU	3

== All-Tournament Team ==
At the conclusion of the championship, the following pairs were announced as members of the All-Tournament Team.

Pair Rank	Team	Players
1	UCLA	Nicole McNamara & Megan McNamara
2	Florida State	Katie Horton & Hailey Luke
3	Hawaii	Carly Kan & Laurel Weaver
4	Pepperdine	Skylar Caputo & Alexis Filippone
5	UCLA	Izzy Carey & Megan Muret

== Media Coverage ==
In December 2017, ESPN was awarded a 5-year contract to provide television coverage of the NCAA Women’s Beach Volleyball Championship, beginning with the 2018 season. In addition, the Selection Show for the championship tournament was broadcast on April 29 at NCAA.com.

=== Television channels ===
The 14 dual matches comprising the entirety of the championship were broadcast on the following channels:

- Day 3: National Championship Final (Match/Dual 14) – ESPN
- Day 3: Semifinal/Elimination Bracket, Final (Match/Dual 13) – ESPN2
- Day 2: Third Round and Elimination Bracket, Second Round (Matches/Duals 9–11) – ESPN2
- Day 2: Elimination Bracket, Third Round (Match/Dual 12) – ESPNU
- Day 1: Opening Rounds – ESPNU (Matches/Duals 1–8)
