= 2017 NCAA Beach Volleyball Championship =

Tournament details
- Dates: May 5–7, 2017
- Teams: 8

Final positions
- Champions: USC Trojans
- Runners-up: Pepperdine Waves

Tournament statistics
- Matches played: 14

The 2017 NCAA Beach Volleyball Championship was the second annual tournament deciding the NCAA championship of beach volleyball, which competition is open to women only. It took place May 5–7 in Gulf Shores, Alabama, hosted by the University of Alabama at Birmingham. It was a double elimination tournament, with a single championship match. The USC Trojans won their second consecutive national title, defeating the Pepperdine Waves 3–2 in the championship match.

== Qualification ==
The tournament is open to teams from Divisions I, II, and III. The top three teams each in the East and West Regions will qualify automatically, and two additional teams will be selected at large. Selections were announced on April 30 on NCAA.com.

Team	Record	Bid Type	Region	Appearance	Last Bid
USC	34–1	Automatic	West	Second	2016
UCLA	29–4	Automatic	West	Second	2016
Pepperdine	24–3	Automatic	West	Second	2016
Florida State	27–7	Automatic	East	Second	2016
Hawaii	25–5	At-large	West	Second	2016
Long Beach State	25–8	At-large	West	First	Never
LSU	26–6	Automatic	East	First	Never
South Carolina	23–9	Automatic	East	First	Never

== Bracket ==
Matches 1–4; Friday, May 5	Matches 7–8; Friday, May 5	Match 11; Saturday, May 6	Championship; Match 14; Sunday, May 7
1	USC	3
8	South Carolina	0
1	USC	3
5	Hawaii	0
4	Florida State	1
5	Hawaii	3
1	USC	3
3	Pepperdine	0
3	Pepperdine	3
6	Long Beach State	0
3	Pepperdine	3
2	UCLA	1
2	UCLA	3
7	LSU	0	1	USC	3
3	Pepperdine	2
Lower round 1	Lower round 2	Lower round 3	Lower final
4	Florida State	3
4	Florida State	3	2	UCLA	1	3	Pepperdine	3
8	South Carolina	0	4	Florida State	2	5	Hawaii	0
5	Hawaii	3
7	LSU	0
6	Long Beach State	2	5	Hawaii	3
7	LSU	3

== Broadcast ==
As in 2016, the tournament was streamed on NCAA.com and broadcast on TruTV and TBS. NCAA.com streamed matches 1–5, 9, & 13, TruTV televised matches 6–8 & 10–12, and TBS the championship match.
