= Loyola Marymount Lions =

Athletic teams that represent Loyola Marymount University

- University: Loyola Marymount University
- NCAA: Division I
- Conference: West Coast Conference (primary); GCC (women's water polo)
- Athletic director: Craig Pintens
- Location: Los Angeles, California
- Varsity teams: 14
- Basketball arena: Gersten Pavilion
- Baseball stadium: George C. Page Stadium
- Softball stadium: Smith Field
- Soccer stadium: Sullivan Field
- Volleyball arena: Gersten Pavilion
- Other venues: Burns Aquatics Center; LMU Tennis Center
- Nickname: Lions
- Colors: Crimson and blue
- Mascot: Iggy the Lion
- Fight song: "Fight on Loyola"
- Website: lmulions.com

The Loyola Marymount Lions are the athletic teams that represent Loyola Marymount University, a Jesuit institution in Los Angeles, California. The school competes in NCAA Division I and the West Coast Conference.

In January 2024, the university announced that it would cut six athletic programs at the end of the 2023–24 season: men’s cross-country, men’s rowing, men’s track and field, women’s rowing, women’s swimming, and women’s track and field.

== Sports sponsored ==
Men's sports	Women's sports
Baseball	Basketball
Basketball	Beach volleyball
Golf	Cross country
Soccer	Soccer
Tennis	Softball
Water Polo	Tennis
	Volleyball
	Water Polo

=== Baseball ===
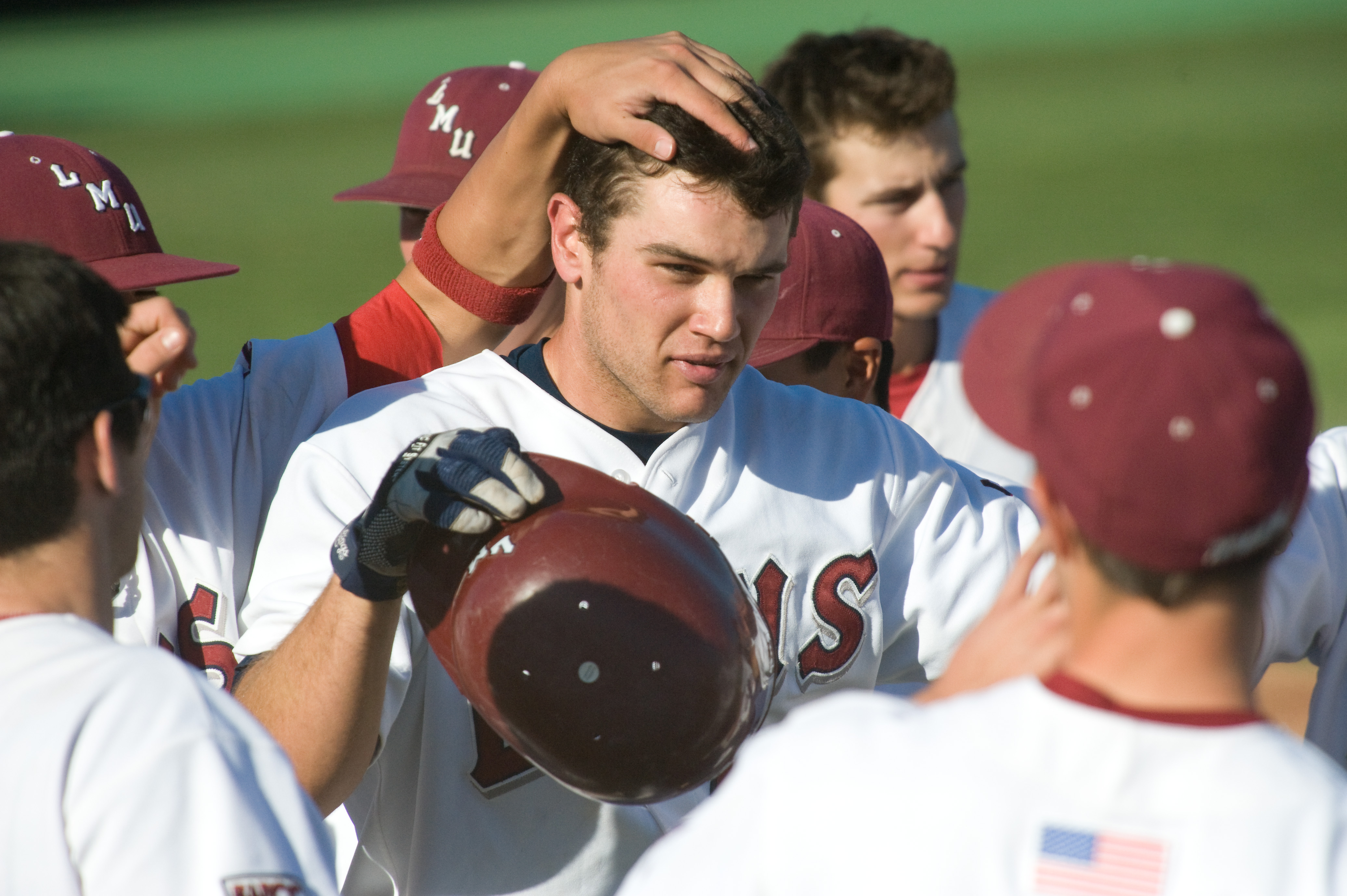
Lions baseball players congratulate Ryan Wheeler on a home run during a game in 2008

The Lions have produced 30 future Major Leaguers, including Billy Bean, MLB's Vice President and Special Assistant to the Commissioner, First-Team All-American and West Coast Conference Player of the Year Billy Traber, two-time Major League Baseball All-Star CJ Wilson, and David Fletcher.

The Lions have been to the College World Series once, in 1986, and also recorded 9 NCAA appearances, and 10 West Coast Conference Championships (three Championship Series and seven regular season).

The Lions play home games at George C. Page Stadium, a 1,200 seat stadium which has been home to the program since 1983.

=== Men's basketball ===
The Lions burst onto the national basketball scene in the late 1980s under coach Paul Westhead. His teams led Division I in scoring in 1988 (110.3 points per game), 1989 (112.5) and 1990 (122.4). LMU's 122.4 point per game in 1990 was still a record as of October 2010. As of October 2010, Loyola Marymount held the five highest combined scoring games in Division I history. Four of the five occurred during Westhead's career, including a record 331 in the 181–150 win over United States International University on January 31, 1989.

The team's last appearance in the NCAA Division I men's basketball tournament was in 1990, where they advanced to the Elite Eight. They would lose to eventual national champion UNLV. Prior to the tournament, Lions star player Hank Gathers died during the WCC conference tournament from a heart condition.

LMU's current men's head coach is Stan Johnson.

=== Women's basketball ===
The Lions won their first ever West Coast Conference title in 2004, going 24-6 (13-1) while beating Gonzaga to go to the NCAA tournament.

=== Men's soccer ===
Michael Erush was a Loyola Marymount University Lions men's soccer standout, a four-time All-West Coast Conference (WCC) selection (2000, 2001, 2002), was named First Team in 2003, and served as team captain during his junior and senior seasons. He was named First Team National Soccer Coaches Association of America All Far West Selection in 2002, and was named First Team All-America by the Jewish Sports Review in 2003. During his last three years, he helped the Lions advance to the NCAA Tournament, and in 2003 finished in a first-round bye and national seeding (#13) in the postseason. He was inducted into the Loyola Marymount Athletics Hall of Fame in 2017.

=== Beach volleyball ===
The Lions fielded their first beach volleyball team during the 2012 season. The Lions won their first WCC Championship in 2019, and they have not lost a championship since (championships were not held in 2020 due to COVID-19). In 2021, the Lions were selected for their first NCAA Beach Volleyball Championship in Gulf Shores, Alabama, where they became the first team since the inaugural season to win its first two matches. The team entered the field of eight as the number five seed and finished the 2021 NCAA Beach Volleyball Championship in third place. They have participated in every national championship since, finishing fifth at the 2022 NCAA Beach Volleyball Championship, 2023 NCAA Beach Volleyball Championship and 2024 NCAA Beach Volleyball Championship. In 2025, Loyola Marymount finished runner–up to TCU in the national championship match, the best finish in program history.

Many LMU beach volleyball alumni compete on the international stage, including Giuliana Corrales (2025), who competed at the 2024 Summer Olympics in Paris for Paraguay; Melanie Paul (2023), who competes for Germany; Reka Orsi-Toth (2022), who competes for Italy; and Betsi Flint (2015), who competes for Team USA.

=== Water polo ===
The women's water polo team was the WWPA Champion in 2001, 2002, 2003, 2004, 2005, and 2007.

At the conclusion the 2004 season, Loyola Marymount's women's water polo team lost to the University of Southern California, 10-8, in the NCAA Women's Water Polo Championship game at Stanford University's Avery Aquatic Center.

== Former sports teams ==
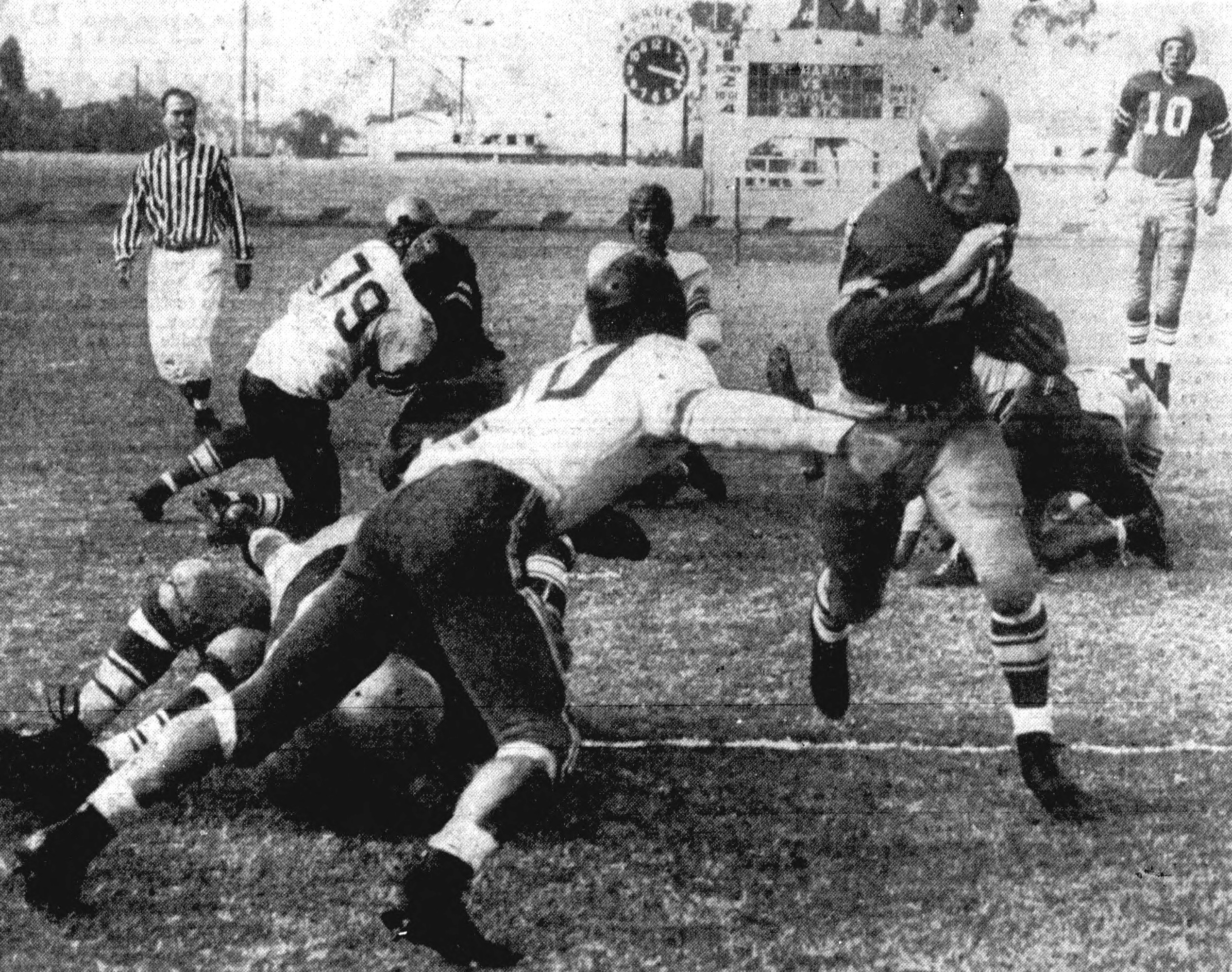
Loyola v Saint Mary's football game in 1950

- Football
- Men's Ice Hockey
- Men's Volleyball (Reid Priddy, LMU Class of 2000 graduate, played volleyball for the Loyola Marymount Lions. He went on to win Olympic gold & bronze medals for the USA.)

In January 2024, Loyola Marymount announced that it would cut six athletic programs after the 2023–24 season: men's cross-country, men's rowing, men's track and field, women's rowing, women's swimming, and women's track and field.

== Athletic facilities ==
- Gersten Pavilion – Men's and women's basketball, Volleyball
- George C. Page Stadium – Baseball
