= 2016 NCAA Beach Volleyball Championship =

Tournament details
- Dates: May 6–8, 2016
- Teams: 8

Final positions
- Champions: USC (1st title)
- Runners-up: Florida State (1st title match)
- Third place: UCLA
- Fourth place: Hawaii

Tournament statistics
- Matches played: 14

The 2016 NCAA Beach Volleyball Championship was the first annual tournament to determine the national champion of NCAA women's collegiate beach volleyball in the United States. The tournament was played on the beaches of Gulf Shores, Alabama, hosted by the University of Alabama at Birmingham, from May 6–8, 2016. The American Volleyball Coaches Association (AVCA) had previously sponsored a beach volleyball championship prior to the NCAA's sanctioning of the sport in 2015.

USC defeated Florida State in the championship match, 3 sets to 0, to clinch the inaugural national title. This was the Trojans' second consecutive national title, having won the last AVCA tournament before the change in the event's sponsor.

== Qualification ==
There is only one national championship for beach volleyball, so all sixty NCAA beach volleyball programs, whether from the Division I, Division II, and Division III, were eligible for the tournament field. A total of eight teams were ultimately invited to contest this championship. Three bids were awarded to the top three teams in both the East and West Regions, and two at-large bids were awarded to the best remaining teams from either region.

=== Teams ===
Team	Record	Bid Type	Region	Appearance	Last Bid
Arizona	19–5	At-large	West	1st	Never
Florida State	29–1	At-large	East	1st	Never
Georgia State	25–8	At-large	East	1st	Never
Hawaii	16–8	At-large	West	1st	Never
Pepperdine	19–3	At-large	West	1st	Never
Stetson	26–7	At-large	East	1st	Never
UCLA	19–6	At-large	West	1st	Never
USC	30–2	At-large	West	1st	Never

=== Format ===
All eight teams were subsequently seeded and paired accordingly in the first round of a double-elimination style tournament to be played across a three-day span. Matches were won by the first team to win three-of-five sets.

== Bracket ==
Matches 1–4; Friday, May 6	Matches 7–8; Friday, May 6	Match 11; Saturday, May 7	Championship; Match 14; Sunday, May 8
1	Florida State	3
8	Stetson	0
1	Florida State	3
5	Hawaii	2
5	Hawaii	3
4	UCLA	0
1	Florida State	1
2	USC	3
3	Pepperdine	3
6	Arizona	1
3	Pepperdine	0
2	USC	3
7	Georgia State	0
2	USC	3	2	USC	3
1	Florida State	0
Lower round 1	Lower round 2	Lower round 3	Lower final
3	Pepperdine	2
8	Stetson	2	4	UCLA	3	1	Florida State	3
4	UCLA	3	4	UCLA	3	4	UCLA	0
5	Hawaii	0
5	Hawaii	3
6	Arizona	3	6	Arizona	0
7	Georgia State	2

== See also ==
- NCAA Women's Indoor Volleyball Championships (Division I, Division II, Division III)
- NCAA Men's National Collegiate Volleyball Championship
