= List of NCAA women's beach volleyball programs =

These collegiate women's beach volleyball teams compete as members of the National Collegiate Athletic Association (NCAA). Currently, 106 college athletic programs sponsor the sport. The majority of the participating programs are members of Division I, though some members of divisions II and III also compete. Unlike in most sports for which the NCAA holds championships, one beach volleyball championship is held, made open to members of all three divisions.

== Current teams ==
As of the 2027 season, these schools sponsor a beach volleyball team that is recognized by the NCAA. All institutions on this list are located within the United States. Conference affiliations reflect those for beach volleyball, and do not necessarily match the schools' primary conferences.

Dates of conference changes reflect beach volleyball seasons, which take place in the calendar year after a conference change takes effect.

| Institution | Teams | Location | State | Conference | Division |
|---|---|---|---|---|---|
| Austin Peay | Governors | Clarksville | TN | Atlantic Sun Conference | I |
| Central Arkansas | Bears | Conway | AR | Atlantic Sun Conference | I |
| Eastern Kentucky | Colonels | Richmond | KY | Atlantic Sun Conference | I |
| Florida Gulf Coast | Eagles | Fort Myers (Note: The FGCU campus has a Fort Myers mailing address but is in unincorporated Lee County.) | FL | Atlantic Sun Conference | I |
| Jacksonville | Dolphins | Jacksonville | FL | Atlantic Sun Conference | I |
| North Alabama | Lions | Florence | AL | Atlantic Sun Conference | I |
| North Florida | Ospreys | Jacksonville | FL | Atlantic Sun Conference | I |
| Stetson | Hatters | DeLand | FL | Atlantic Sun Conference | I |
| Tarleton State | Texans | Stephenville | TX | Atlantic Sun Conference | I |
| West Georgia | Wolves | Carrollton | GA | Atlantic Sun Conference | I |
| Arizona | Wildcats | Tucson | AZ | Big 12 Conference | I |
| Arizona State | Sun Devils | Tempe | AZ | Big 12 Conference | I |
| Boise State | Broncos | Boise | ID | Big 12 Conference | I |
| Florida State | Seminoles | Tallahassee | FL | Big 12 Conference | I |
| South Carolina | Gamecocks | Columbia | SC | Big 12 Conference | I |
| TCU | Horned Frogs | Fort Worth | TX | Big 12 Conference | I |
| Bakersfield | Roadrunners | Bakersfield | CA | Big West Conference | I |
| Cal Poly | Mustangs | San Luis Obispo | CA | Big West Conference | I |
| Cal State Northridge | Matadors | Northridge (Note: Northridge is one of many Los Angeles neighborhoods with postal identities separate from the city.) | CA | Big West Conference | I |
| Hawai'i | BeachBows | Honolulu | HI | Big West Conference | I |
| Long Beach State | Beach | Long Beach | CA | Big West Conference | I |
| Sacramento State | Hornets | Sacramento | CA | Big West Conference | I |
| Florida Atlantic | Owls | Boca Raton | FL | Conference USA | I |
| FIU | Panthers | Miami (Note: The main FIU campus has a Miami mailing address but is in the unincorporated Miami-Dade County community of University Park.) | FL | Conference USA | I |
| Missouri State | Beach Bears | Springfield | MO | Conference USA | I |
| Sam Houston | Bearkats | Huntsville | TX | Conference USA | I |
| South Florida | Bulls | Tampa | FL | Conference USA | I |
| Tulane | Green Wave | New Orleans | LA | Conference USA | I |
| UAB | Blazers | Birmingham | AL | Conference USA | I |
| UTEP | Miners | El Paso | TX | Conference USA | I |
| Chattanooga | Mocs | Chattanooga | TN | Ohio Valley Conference | I |
| Eastern Illinois | Panthers | Charleston | IL | Ohio Valley Conference | I |
| Lindenwood | Lions | St. Charles | MO | Ohio Valley Conference | I |
| Morehead State | Eagles | Morehead | KY | Ohio Valley Conference | I |
| UT Martin | Skyhawks | Martin | TN | Ohio Valley Conference | I |
| Tennessee Tech | Golden Eagles | Cookeville | TN | Ohio Valley Conference | I |
| California | Golden Bears | Berkeley | CA | Mountain Pacific Sports Federation | I |
| Grand Canyon | Antelopes | Phoenix | AZ | Mountain Pacific Sports Federation (Big West Conference in 2028) | I |
| LSU | Tigers | Baton Rouge | LA | Mountain Pacific Sports Federation | I |
| Oregon | Ducks | Eugene | OR | Mountain Pacific Sports Federation | I |
| San Jose State | Spartans | San Jose | CA | Mountain Pacific Sports Federation (Big West Conference in 2028) | I |
| Stanford | Cardinal | Stanford | CA | Mountain Pacific Sports Federation | I |
| Texas | Longhorns | Austin | TX | Mountain Pacific Sports Federation | I |
| UCLA | Bruins | Los Angeles | CA | Mountain Pacific Sports Federation | I |
| USC | Trojans | Los Angeles | CA | Mountain Pacific Sports Federation | I |
| Washington | Huskies | Seattle | WA | Mountain Pacific Sports Federation | I |
| Houston Christian | Huskies | Houston | TX | Southland Conference | I |
| LSU New Orleans | Privateers | New Orleans | LA | Southland Conference | I |
| McNeese | Cowgirls | Lake Charles | LA | Southland Conference | I |
| Nicholls | Colonels | Thibodaux | LA | Southland Conference | I |
| Southeastern Louisiana | Lady Lions | Hammond | LA | Southland Conference | I |
| Stephen F. Austin | Ladyjacks | Nacogdoches | TX | Southland Conference | I |
| Texas A&M–Corpus Christi | Islanders | Corpus Christi | TX | Southland Conference | I |
| Charleston | Cougars | Charleston | SC | Sun Belt Conference | I |
| Coastal Carolina | Chanticleers | Conway | SC | Sun Belt Conference | I |
| Georgia State | Panthers | Atlanta | GA | Sun Belt Conference | I |
| ULM | Warhawks | Monroe | LA | Sun Belt Conference | I |
| Mercer | Bears | Macon | GA | Sun Belt Conference | I |
| Southern Miss | Golden Eagles | Hattiesburg | MS | Sun Belt Conference | I |
| UNC Wilmington | Seahawks | Wilmington | NC | Sun Belt Conference | I |
| Loyola Marymount | Lions | Los Angeles | CA | West Coast Conference | I |
| Pacific | Tigers | Stockton | CA | West Coast Conference | I |
| Pepperdine | Waves | Malibu (Note: Pepperdine has a Malibu mailing address but is outside the city limits in unincorporated Los Angeles County.) | CA | West Coast Conference | I |
| Portland | Pilots | Portland | OR | West Coast Conference | I |
| Saint Mary's | Gaels | Moraga | CA | West Coast Conference | I |
| San Diego | Toreros | San Diego | CA | West Coast Conference | I |
| San Francisco | Dons | San Francisco | CA | West Coast Conference | I |
| Santa Clara | Broncos | Santa Clara | CA | West Coast Conference | I |
| UC Davis | Aggies | Davis | CA | West Coast Conference | I |
| Nebraska | Cornhuskers | Lincoln | NE | Independent | I |
| Cal State Los Angeles | Golden Eagles | Los Angeles | CA | Independent | II |
| Chaminade | Silverswords | Honolulu | HI | Independent | II |
| Colorado Mesa | Mavericks | Grand Junction | CO | Independent | II |
| Concordia–Irvine | Golden Eagles | Irvine | CA | Independent | II |
| Hawaii Pacific | Sharks | Honolulu | HI | Independent | II |
| McKendree | Bearcats | Lebanon | IL | Independent | II |
| Southwest Baptist | Bearcats | Bolivar | MO | Independent | II |
| Spring Hill | Badgers | Mobile | AL | Independent | II |
| Texas A&M–Kingsville | Javelinas | Kingsville | TX | Independent | II |
| Vanguard | Lions | Costa Mesa | CA | Independent | II |
| Wayne State | Wildcats | Wayne | NE | Independent | II |
| Carson–Newman | Eagles | Jefferson City | TN | South Atlantic Conference | II |
| Catawba | Indians | Salisbury | NC | South Atlantic Conference | II |
| Emmanuel | Lions | Franklin Springs | GA | South Atlantic Conference | II |
| Erskine | Flying Fleet | Due West | SC | South Atlantic Conference | II |
| Tusculum | Pioneers | Tusculum (Note: Mailing address is Greeneville.) | TN | South Atlantic Conference | II |
| Wingate | Bulldogs | Wingate | NC | South Atlantic Conference | II |
| Barry | Buccaneers | Miami Shores | FL | Sunshine State Conference | II |
| Eckerd | Tritons | St. Petersburg | FL | Sunshine State Conference | II |
| Florida Southern | Moccasins | Lakeland | FL | Sunshine State Conference | II |
| Palm Beach Atlantic | Sailfish | West Palm Beach | FL | Sunshine State Conference | II |
| Saint Leo | Lions | Saint Leo | FL | Sunshine State Conference | II |
| Tampa | Spartans | Tampa | FL | Sunshine State Conference | II |
| Concordia (TX) | Tornados | Austin | TX | American Southwest Conference | III |
| East Texas Baptist | Tigers | Marshall | TX | American Southwest Conference | III |
| Howard Payne | Yellow Jackets | Brownwood | TX | American Southwest Conference | III |
| Huntingdon | Hawks | Montgomery | AL | American Southwest Conference | III |
| Mary Hardin–Baylor | Crusaders | Belton | TX | American Southwest Conference | III |
| Schreiner | Mountaineers | Kerrville | TX | American Southwest Conference | III |
| Berry | Vikings | Mount Berry | GA | Independent | III |
| Hendrix | Warriors | Conway | AR | Independent | III |
| LaGrange | Panthers | LaGrange | GA | Independent | III |
| Lynchburg | Hornets | Lynchburg | VA | Independent | III |
| Regent | Royals | Virginia Beach | VA | Independent | III |
| Salem College | Spirits | Winston-Salem | NC | Independent | III |
| Southern Virginia | Knights | Buena Vista | VA | Independent | III |
| Stevenson | Mustangs | Stevenson | MD | Independent | III |

== Future teams ==
In addition to those listed above, five universities are adding beach volleyball, four in 2027–28 and one more in 2028–29.

| Institution | Teams | Location | State | Conference | Div. | First season |
|---|---|---|---|---|---|---|
| Fresno Pacific | Sunbirds | Fresno | CA | Independent | II | 2028 |
| Loyola New Orleans | Wolf Pack | New Orleans | LA | Independent | II | 2028 |
| Murray State | Racers | Murray | KY | Independent | I | 2028 |
| Texas A&M–Texarkana | Eagles | Texarkana | TX | Independent | II | 2028 |
| Texas Wesleyan | Rams | Fort Worth | TX | Independent | II | 2029 |
