= LSU Tigers women's beach volleyball =

American college volleyball team

LSU Tigers
- University: Louisiana State University
- Head coach: Russell Brock (3rd season)
- Conference: MPSF
- Location: Baton Rouge, Louisiana, US
- Home arena: LSU Beach Volleyball Stadium
- Colors: Purple and gold

AIAW/NCAA tournament semifinal
- 2019

AIAW/NCAA tournament appearance
- 2017, 2018, 2019, 2021, 2022

The LSU Tigers women's beach volleyball team represents Louisiana State University in the sport of beach volleyball. The Tigers compete in Division I of the National Collegiate Athletic Association (NCAA) and the Mountain Pacific Sports Federation (MPSF), and play their home matches at the new on-campus LSU Beach Volleyball Stadium in Baton Rouge, Louisiana. They are currently led by head coach Russell Brock.

== History ==
The LSU Tigers beach volleyball team, originally known as the "LSU Tigers sand volleyball team", played its first season in 2014. The first coach of the Tigers was Fran Flory (2014–2016) who compiled a record of 40–28 (.588) at LSU.

In 2016, Russell Brock became head beach volleyball coach at LSU.

== Year-by-year results ==
Year	Head Coach	Overall	Conference	Standing	Division	Postseason
LSU Tigers (Coastal Collegiate Sports Association) (2014–present)
2014	Fran Flory	6–10				
2015	Fran Flory	14–9				
2016	Fran Flory	20–9				
2017	Russell Brock	27–8				NCAA Championship Tournament
2018	Russell Brock	26–12				NCAA Championship Tournament
2019	Russell Brock	31–8				NCAA Championship Tournament
Total		124–56				

== Home Court/Practice and Training facilities ==
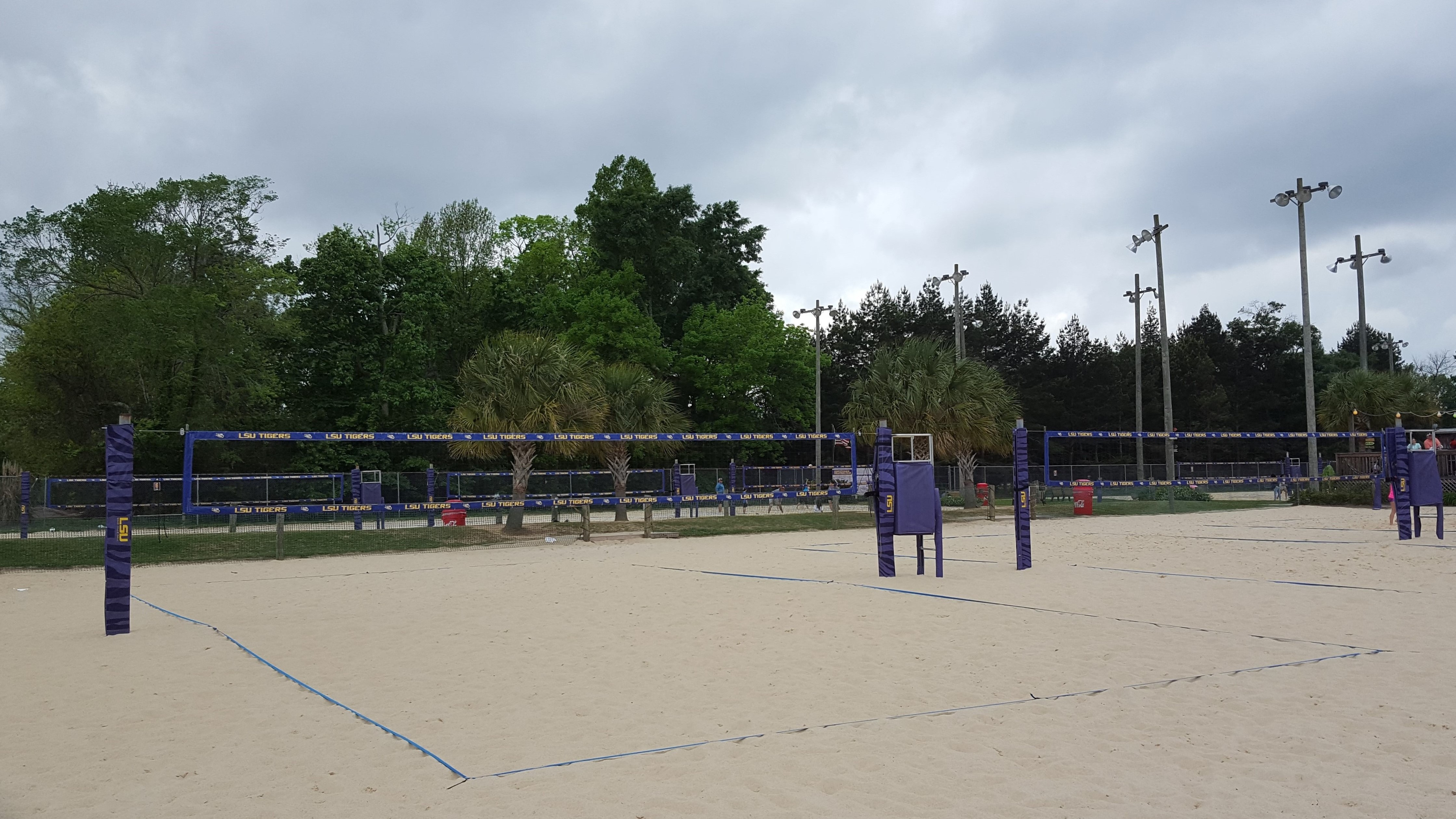
Mango's Beach Volleyball Club - Home Court from 2014 to 2018

=== LSU Beach Volleyball Stadium ===
The LSU Beach Volleyball Stadium is the home court and practice facility for the beach volleyball team starting with the 2019 season.

=== Mango's Beach Volleyball Club ===
Mango's Beach Volleyball Club was the home court and practice facility for the beach volleyball team from 2014 to 2018. Mango's is a privately owned beach volleyball facility open to the public, located in Baton Rouge, Louisiana. The facility has 13 sand courts.

== Head coaches ==
Name	Years	Record at LSU
Fran Flory	2014–2016	40–28 Overall
Russell Brock	2017–present	84–28 Overall

== See also ==
- LSU Tigers and Lady Tigers
- List of NCAA women's beach volleyball programs
