= Double-elimination tournament =

Type of elimination competition

A double-elimination bracket from the 2004 National Science Bowl

A double-elimination tournament is a type of elimination tournament competition in which a participant ceases to be eligible to win the tournament's championship upon having lost two games or matches. It stands in contrast to a single-elimination tournament, in which only one defeat results in elimination.

One method of arranging a double-elimination tournament is to break the competitors into two sets of brackets, the winners' bracket and losers' bracket (W and L brackets for short; also referred to as championship bracket and elimination bracket, upper bracket and lower bracket, or main bracket and repechage) after the first round. The first-round winners proceed into the W bracket and the losers proceed into the L bracket. The W bracket is conducted in the same manner as a single-elimination tournament, except that the losers of each round "drop down" into the L bracket. Another method of double-elimination tournament management is the Draw and Process.

As with single-elimination tournaments, most often the number of competitors is equal to a power of two (8, 16, 32, etc.) so that in each round there is an even number of competitors and never any byes.

The number of games in a double-elimination tournament is one or two less than twice the number of teams participating (e.g. 8 teams would see 14 or 15 games).

== Conducting the tournament ==
If the standard double-elimination bracket arrangement is being used, then each round of the L bracket is conducted in two stages: a minor stage followed by a major stage. Both contain the same number of matches (assuming there are no byes) which is the same again as the number of matches in the corresponding round of the W bracket. If the minor stage of an L bracket round contains N matches, it will produce N winners. Meanwhile, the N matches in the corresponding round of the W bracket will produce N losers. These 2N competitors will then pair off in the N matches of the corresponding major stage of the L bracket.

For example, in an eight-competitor double-elimination tournament, the four losers of the first round, W bracket quarter finals, pair off in the first stage of the L bracket, the L bracket minor semifinals. The two losers are eliminated, while the two winners proceed to the L bracket major semifinals. Here, those two players/teams will each compete against a loser of the W bracket semifinal in the L bracket major semifinals. The winners of the L bracket major semifinals compete against each other in the L bracket minor-final, with the winner playing the loser of the W bracket final in the L bracket major final.

The final round of a double-elimination tournament is usually set up to be a possible two games, with the second referred to as the "if game" or "bracket reset". In this structure, the L bracket finalist needs to win both games of the final round to be the tournament champion, while the W bracket finalist wins the tournament by winning either game of the final round. If the final round is scheduled as only a single game, as in the 2018 NCAA Beach Volleyball Championship, the W bracket finalist will be eliminated from the tournament if they lose this match, meaning the tournament is not truly a double-elimination tournament.

== Pros and cons ==
The double-elimination format has some advantages over the single-elimination format, most notably the fact that third and fourth places can be determined without the use of a consolation or "classification" match involving two contestants who have already been eliminated from winning the championship.

Some tournaments, such as in tennis, will use "seeding" to prevent the strongest contestants from meeting until the later round. However, in tournaments where contestants are placed randomly in the draw, or in situations where seeding is not available, it is possible for two of the strongest teams to meet in the early rounds rather than a final or semifinal as would be expected in a seeded draw. Double elimination overcomes this shortfall by allowing a strong team which loses early to work their way through the L bracket and progress to the later rounds, despite meeting the strongest team in the early rounds of competition.

Another advantage of the double-elimination format is the fact that all competitors will play at least twice and three quarters will play three games or more. In a single-elimination tournament with no byes, half of the competitors will be eliminated after their first game. This can be disappointing to those who had to travel to the tournament and were only able to play once.

A disadvantage compared to the single-elimination format is that at least twice the number of matches have to be conducted. Since each competitor has to lose twice and since the tournament ends when only one competitor remains, in a tournament for n competitors there will be either 2n − 2 or 2n − 1 games depending on whether or not the winner was undefeated during the tournament. This may result in a scheduling hardship for venues where only one facility for play is available. However, the number of matches is still lower than what is required by a Swiss-system tournament or round-robin tournament.

If the championship final has two matches scheduled (as typical of a double-elimination tournament), should the winners' bracket winner defeat the losers' bracket winner, the tournament ends. It is therefore unknown, until this match has been concluded, whether the second scheduled match will in fact be required. This can also be seen as a disadvantage of the system, particularly if broadcasting and ticket sales companies have an interest in the tournament.

Another disadvantage of the double-elimination format is the fact that some games are played by competitors that have completed an unequal number of matches so far in the tournament. For example, in a tournament with sixteen players, one needs to win four games to qualify for the final through the winners' bracket, whereas the finalist from the losers' bracket could have played anywhere between five and seven games to reach the same outcome. The differences in the number of matches for a given stage of a double-elimination tournament, especially in the later stages, could result in an uneven level of preparation or energy between competitors; a player in the winners' bracket may have a long wait between matches, while losers' bracket players have to play multiple games in a comparatively short timeframe. (Whether either situation will be an advantage for a particular player will vary individually.)

== Examples of use ==
=== Baseball and softball ===
The NCAA Division I baseball and softball tournaments make heavy use of the double-elimination format. In both tournaments' regional stages, four teams contest each regional in a double-elimination bracket and the survivor advances to the best-of-three super regionals. The format recurs in both the Men's and Women's College World Series (MCWS and WCWS), where the field of 8 teams is divided into two double-elimination brackets and the survivor of each bracket advances to the best-of-three championship series. While the two brackets remain completely separate in the MCWS, there is a crossover feature in the WCWS, by which the loser of the second-round game in each bracket moves to the opposite bracket to play an elimination game. This format means that any two of the participating teams can advance to the championship series, which the current MCWS format does not allow.

The Little League World Series switched from round-robin to double-elimination formats for each of its pools starting in 2010 in an effort to eliminate meaningless games. The World Baseball Classic used a double-elimination format for its second rounds of the tournament in 2009 and 2013, as well as in its first round in 2009. The 2020 Olympic baseball event also used a modified double elimination bracket, combined with a preliminary group stage.

=== Other sports ===
Double-elimination brackets are also popular in amateur wrestling of all levels, whereas in professional wrestling, World Championship Wrestling (WCW) and Total Nonstop Action Wrestling (TNA) were the only professional wrestling promotions to date to use the double-elimination format. WCW used the format for a tournament for the vacant WCW World Tag Team Championship in 1999. On the June 26, 2002, weekly Asylum PPV, TNA used a double-elimination match to determine the TNA X Division Championship in a four-way match featuring AJ Styles, Jerry Lynn, Low Ki, and Psicosis.

Pool, surfing, windsurfing and kiteboarding freestyle competitions, as well as Curling bonspiels (where triple-elimination is also used), Hardcourt Bike Polo are all known to sometimes use double-elimination formats. It is also used in table football tournaments.

In contract bridge, the English Bridge Union Spring Foursomes, first contested in 1962, uses a double-elimination format. It is also used, in modified form, in the All-Ireland Senior Gaelic Football Championship and All-Ireland Senior Hurling Championship.

It is also used largely in esport competitions such as Counter-Strike, League of Legends, Dota 2, Rocket League, as well as numerous fighting games among others. Four-team or four-player groups using double elimination are called "GSL-style groups" in reference to the Global StarCraft II League in Korea, which historically has used such a group format.

The FIRST Robotics Competition began using the double-elimination bracket starting with the 2023 season.

== Variations ==
In judo, players that end up in the L bracket can finish in third place at best. The winner of the W bracket will win the tournament, with the losing finalist finishing second. The other losers of the W bracket will end up in the L bracket, which will only be played to the minor stage of the final, resulting in two players placed third. Thus, compared to double elimination, there is no major stage of the L bracket final played, and there is no game between the winners of the W and L brackets.

Another aspect of the system used in judo is that losers of the first round (of the W bracket) only advance to the L bracket if the player they lost to wins their match of the second round. If a player loses to a second round loser, they are eliminated from the tournament.

Another variant, called the (third-place) challenge, is used, particularly in scholastic wrestling. The winner of the L bracket may challenge the loser of the finals in the W bracket, if and only if the two contestants had not faced each other previously; if the challenger (the winner of the L bracket) wins, they are awarded second place, and the loser of the W final is dropped to third place. This system is used particularly where the top two places advance to a higher level of competition (example: advancement from a regional tournament to a state tournament).

Another is the balanced variant which is a bracket arrangement that is not strictly divided into two brackets based on number of losses. Players with different numbers of losses can play each other in any round. A goal of the variant is that no player sits idle for more than one round consecutively. The added complexity of the brackets is handled by using "if necessary" matches. The flexible approach allows practical bracket designs to be made for any number of competitors including odd numbers (9, 10, 11, 12, 13, etc.).

A possible alternative is a single-elimination format where each match is a best-of-5-or-more series. This format still allows a competitor to lose (perhaps multiple times) while still remaining eligible to win the tournament. Of course, having multiple games in each series also requires considerably more games to be conducted. It is also susceptible to bad seeding.

Another is the modified single-elimination tournament which guarantees at least two games per competitor, but not necessarily two losses for elimination. The brackets are similar to double-elimination, except the two finalists from the L bracket (each with one loss) face the two finalists from the W bracket (neither with a loss) in a single elimination semi-final and final.

The Little League World Series began using a modified double-elimination bracket in 2011. Eight U.S. teams and eight international teams compete in respective double elimination formats until their respective championship games, which are single elimination. That is, irrespective of whether a team has one loss, or no losses, that team would be eliminated with a loss in either the U.S. or international championship game. The two respective champions then play a single elimination game for the World Series championship.

Many esports competitions, such as The International use a variation on the double-elimination format where, after the initial group stage, the first round of the L bracket begins pre-seeded with the lower-performing teams from said stage, rather than all teams starting in the W bracket. Additionally, the finals are a single series regardless of winner, without any chance of a bracket reset if the L bracket winner wins the series. Much of this is due to time concerns, with some esports games taking upwards of an hour per match in a series, and the schedule not allowing for the additional time costs of scheduling like a traditional double-elimination tournament. However, many events that employ this format also schedule the event so that the W bracket teams have advantageous scheduling, with L bracket teams often having to play additional series on the final day, and W bracket teams getting considerably more time off to watch opponents. In 2026, the Valorant Champions Tour used a triple-elimination bracket for the Kickoff stage of its International Leagues, adding an additional third bracket for teams who accrued a loss in the L bracket (known as the middle bracket).

== Other tournament systems ==
Variations of the double-elimination tournament include:

- Elimination tournament
- Single-elimination tournament
- Page playoff system

Other common tournament types are

- Round-robin tournament
- Swiss-system tournament
- Playoffs – a variation of the single-elimination tournament where instead of one win, a team needs to win a specific number of games in a series in order to advance.
