= List of University of Alabama at Birmingham people =

This is a partial list of people affiliated with the University of Alabama at Birmingham.

== Administrators ==
=== Presidents ===
- Joseph F. Volker, 1969–1976
- George Campbell, 1976-1977 (interim)
- S. Richardson Hill, 1977-1986
- Charles "Scotty" McCallum, 1986-1987 (interim), 1987-1993
- Claude Bennett, 1993-1996
- Paul Hardin, 1997 (interim)
- W. Ann Reynolds, 1997–2002
- Malcolm Portera, 2002 (interim)
- Carol Z. Garrison, 2002–2012
- Ray Watts, 2013–present

== Alumni ==
=== Athletics ===
- Danya Barsalona, professional soccer player
- Murry Bartow, Division 1 men's basketball coach
- Zack Bryant (born 1997), basketball player in the Israeli Basketball Premier League
- Paul Delaney (born 1986), basketball player in the Israeli National League
- Vonetta Flowers, Olympic gold medalist
- Darrell Hackney, NFL player with the Denver Broncos
- Carlos Hendricks, football player
- Chris Hubbard, NFL player
- Deanna Jackson, WNBA player with the Chicago Sky
- Dejan Jakovic, professional soccer player
- Andy Kennedy, University of Alabama at Birmingham men's basketball coach
- Yaxel Lendeborg, NBA player with the Golden State Warriors
- Graeme McDowell, professional golfer
- Jason McLaughlin, professional soccer player with the Atlanta Silverbacks
- Tony McManus, professional soccer player with the Atlanta Silverbacks
- Elijah Millsap, professional basketball player with the Petron Blaze Boosters
- Jerson Monteiro, professional soccer player with the Atlanta Silverbacks
- Izell Reese, NFL player with the Dallas Cowboys, Denver Broncos and Buffalo Bills
- Oliver Robinson, State of Alabama Legislator and former NBA player with the San Antonio Spurs
- McKinley Singleton, NBA player with the New York Knicks
- Dainon Sidney, NFL player with the Tennessee Titans, Buffalo Bills, and Detroit Lions
- Donell Taylor, NBA player with the Washington Wizards
- Bryan Thomas, NFL player with the New York Jets
- Joe Webb, NFL player with the Carolina Panthers
- Roddy White, retired NFL player with the Atlanta Falcons
- Garrett Whitlock, MLB player with the Boston Red Sox
- Bobby Keyes, football player

=== Business and public figures ===
- Toshiko Abe, Japanese minister of education, culture, sports, sciences, and technology
- William A. Bell, former mayor of Birmingham, Alabama
- Beth Chapman, Alabama secretary of state and former state auditor
- Chris Collins, member of Congress NY-27
- Deidre Downs, Miss America 2005
- Robert Duvall, member of Kentucky state house; graduated 1995 with doctorate in optometry
- Larry Langford, former mayor of Birmingham, Alabama
- Walt Maddox, mayor of Tuscaloosa, Alabama
- Oliver Robinson, Alabama legislator and former NBA player with the San Antonio Spurs
- Richard Scrushy, founder and former CEO of HealthSouth Corporation
- Mark Shirey, member of the Alabama House of Representatives
- Alexander Shunnarah

=== Science, media and the arts ===
- Regina Benjamin, Surgeon General of the United States
- Jon Coffelt, painter, multimedia artist
- Clayton Colvin, artist, painter, art educator
- Larry DeLucas, astronaut and research scientist
- Edward F. Fischer, professor of Anthropology at Vanderbilt University
- Hadiyah-Nicole Green, medical physicist at Morehouse School of Medicine
- Sam Hunt, country musician and former UAB quarterback
- John Knox, meteorologist, professor at University of Georgia
- George A. Miller, psychologist, cognitive scientist
- Chris McDermott, advanced practice registered nurse autonomous practice of Intercoastal Health and certified life care planner of Intercoastal Consulting & Life Care Planning
- David Sandlin, artist, book artist
- Faisal Shuaib, physician, public health expert, and executive director and chief executive officer of Nigeria's National Primary Health Care Development Agency
- Melissa Springer, photojournalist

=== Other ===
- Hoda Muthana, ISIS bride

== Faculty and researchers ==
- David B. Allison, distinguished professor, Quetelet Endowed Professor of Public Health, associate dean for Science
- Eli Capilouto, former Dean of UAB School of Public Health, former provost of UAB, and current president of the University of Kentucky
- April Carson, epidemiologist
- Larry DeLucas, astronaut and research scientist
- Ibrahim Fawal, professor of film and literature
- Edith Frohock, book maker and educator
- Stephen Glosecki, scholar of Old English
- Wendy Gunther-Canada, professor in the department of government
- Tinsley Randolph Harrison, physician and editor of the first five editions of Harrison's Principles of Internal Medicine
- Basil Hirschowitz, father of the modern endoscope
- Robert Hyatt, co-author of Cray Blitz, two-time winner of the World Computer Chess Championships
- Adrienne C. Lahti, F. Cleveland Kinney Endowed Chair in the Department of Psychiatry and Behavioral Neurobiology
- Timothy R. Levine, distinguished professor and chair of Communication Studies, creator of Truth-Default Theory
- Kerry Madden, professor of creative writing
- Carl E. Misch, founded The Misch International Implant Institute
- David M. Morris, distinguished professor of physical therapy
- Shin Joong Oh, distinguished professor of Neurology Emeritus and Professor of Pathology
- Henry Panion, university professor of Music, music director for Stevie Wonder, Grammy Award-winning arranger and producer
- Gregory Pence, professor of philosophy
- Ray Reach, former director of the UAB Jazz Ensemble (1998–2005), arranger, composer, jazz pianist and vocalist, director of Student Jazz Programs at the Alabama Jazz Hall of Fame
- Michael Saag, AIDS researcher
- Jessica A. Scoffield, microbiologist
- Eric Sorscher, director of the Gregory Fleming James Cystic Fibrosis Research Center, 1994–2015
