= UAB Blazers =

Intercollegiate sports teams of University of Alabama at Birmingham

- University: University of Alabama at Birmingham
- Nickname: Blazers
- NCAA: Division I (FBS)
- Conference: The American (primary); CUSA (beach volleyball); MEAC (bowling); Southern Conference (rifle)
- Athletic director: Andy Kennedy (Interim)
- Location: Birmingham, Alabama
- Varsity teams: 18 intercollegiate sports
- Football stadium: Protective Stadium
- Basketball arena: Bartow Arena
- Baseball stadium: Regions Field / Young Memorial Field
- Soccer stadium: PNC Field
- Colors: UAB Green and UAB Gold
- Mascot: Blaze
- Fight song: UAB Fight Song
- Website: uabsports.com
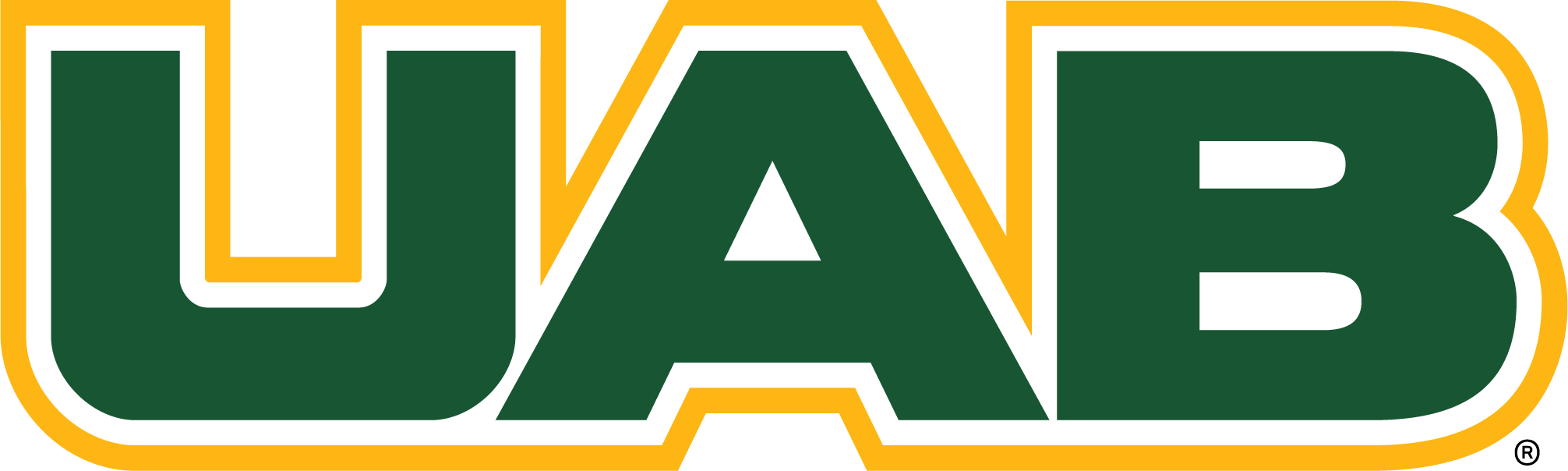

The UAB Blazers are the varsity intercollegiate athletic programs that represent the University of Alabama at Birmingham (UAB) located in Birmingham, Alabama. The school is one of the fifteen member institutions of the American Conference and participates in Division I of the NCAA. The Blazers' colors are green and gold.

UAB is best known for its football and basketball programs. The men's basketball program was established by founding coach Gene Bartow in 1978 and has made multiple NCAA Tournament appearances. The football program, which plays at Protective Stadium, gained national attention when it was controversially shut down in 2014 and reinstated in 2017, going on to win two conference championships upon its return. Since football was reinstated, UAB has undertaken major athletics facilities projects, including the opening of Protective Stadium, construction of a football operations center and covered practice facility, and renovations to Bartow Arena.

UAB joined the Sun Belt Conference in 1979 and competed there through 1991. After a brief stint in the Great Midwest Conference, the school became a charter member of Conference USA in 1995 and joined the American Conference on July 1, 2023.

== Conference affiliations ==
American logo in UAB's colors

NCAA

- NCAA Division I Independent (1978–1979)
- Sun Belt Conference (1979–1991)
- Great Midwest Conference (1991–1995)
- Conference USA (1995–2023)
- American Conference (2023–present)

== Sports sponsored ==
A member of the American Conference, UAB sponsors teams in seven men's and eleven women's NCAA sanctioned sports.

Men's sports	Women's sports
Football	Basketball
Basketball	Beach volleyball‡
Baseball	Bowling§
Golf	Cross country
Rifle¶	Golf
Soccer	Rifle¶
Tennis	Soccer
	Softball
	Tennis
	Track and field†
	Volleyball
† – Track and field includes both indoor and outdoor.
‡ – Competes in Conference USA as an affiliate member.
§ – Competes in the Mid-Eastern Athletic Conference as an affiliate member.
¶ – Competes in the Southern Conference as an affiliate member.

=== Basketball ===
==== Men's basketball ====
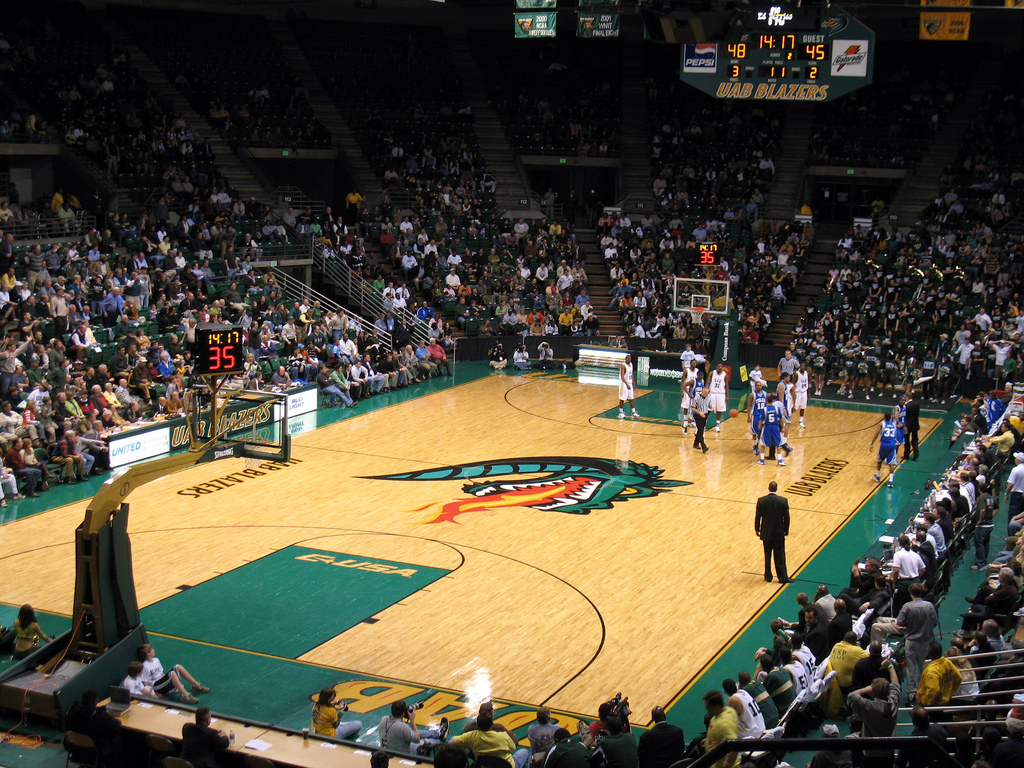
UAB Blazers Men's Basketball vs. Tulsa at Bartow Arena

UAB’s athletics program began with the creation of a men’s basketball team in 1978. The university hired Gene Bartow, who had previously coached at UCLA, Illinois, and Memphis, to build the program from scratch. Bartow guided the Blazers to their first NCAA Tournament appearance in just their third season and went on to lead the program to seven tournament bids during his 18-year tenure.

The program has made 17 NCAA Tournament appearances overall, including three Sweet Sixteen runs and an Elite Eight appearance in 1982. Notable postseason moments include upsets of Kentucky as a No. 1 seed in 2004 and Iowa State as a No. 3 seed in 2015. UAB has also made 13 NIT appearances. The Blazers’ most recent conference championship came in 2024, when they won the American Conference tournament title. UAB played its home games at the Birmingham–Jefferson Convention Complex until 1988, when the program moved to the on-campus Bartow Arena, named in Bartow’s honor. Andy Kennedy, who played for UAB, is the team's head coach.

==== Women's basketball ====
UAB’s women’s basketball program has established a notable history of its own. Since the program’s inception, the Blazers have won four conference championships, made two NCAA Tournament appearances, and made five WNIT appearances, most recently in 2013. No Conference USA women’s basketball team has advanced further in the NCAA Tournament than UAB, which reached the Sweet Sixteen in 1999–2000. The Blazers also advanced to the WNIT Elite Eight and won the WBI championship in 2011.

=== Football ===
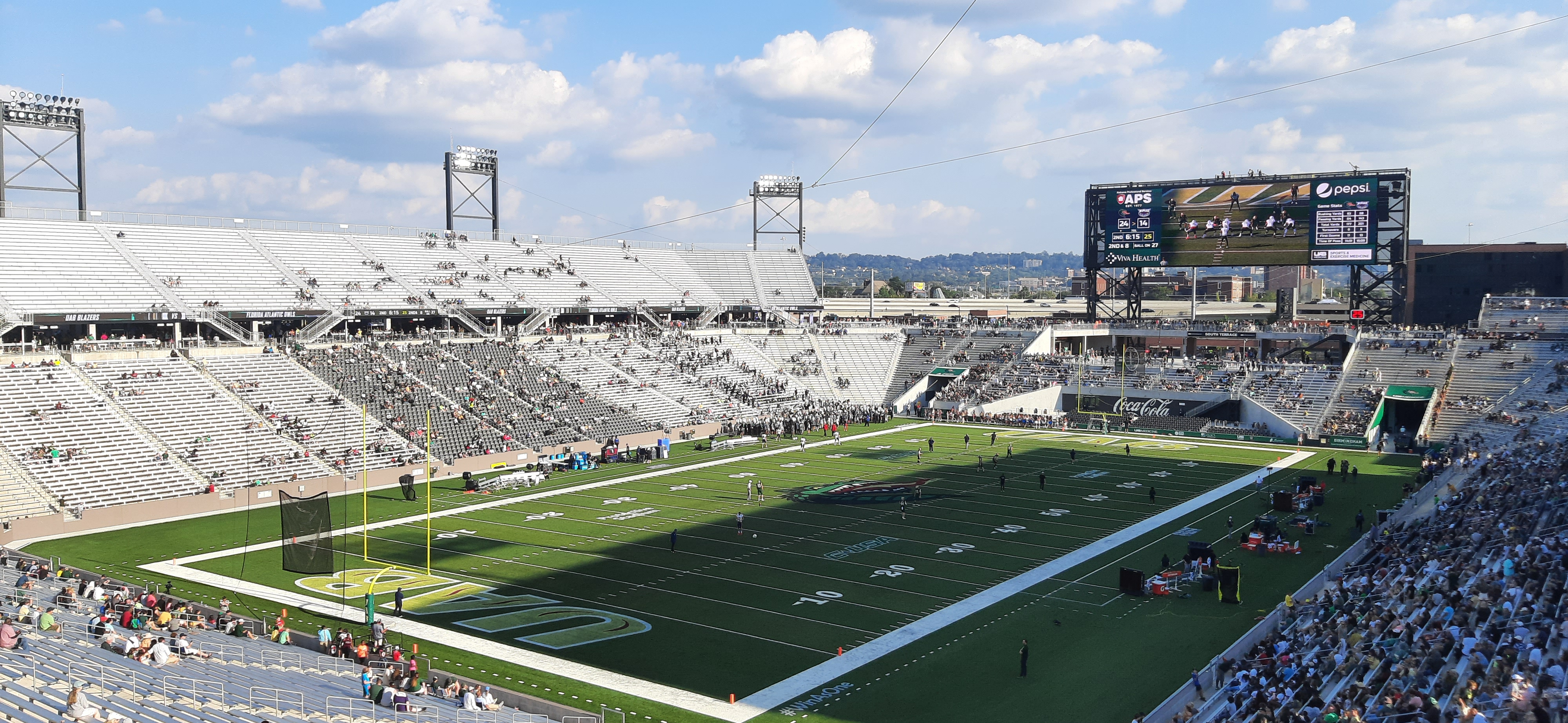
Protective Stadium

UAB began its football program in the early 1990s. Jim Hilyer was the first head coach of the Blazers, coaching from 1991 to 1994.

Beginning with the first NCAA sanctioned Division III football team in 1991, UAB joined Division I-AA in 1993 and moved to Division I-A in 1996, joining Conference USA in 1999.

Coach Watson Brown took over as head coach in 1995 and held the position through the end of the 2006 season, when he left for Tennessee Tech. Neil Callaway was named head coach after a deal with Jimbo Fisher collapsed. After five seasons, Callaway was dismissed, and Garrick McGee was hired from the University of Arkansas after Callaway was released. He held the post for two years before leaving to accept the offensive coordinator job at the University of Louisville, replaced by Bill Clark.

In 2000, UAB achieved a significant victory by beating LSU in Baton Rouge. In 2004, UAB reached its first ever bowl game, falling 59–40 in the Hawaii Bowl to Hawaii. In 2011, an effort to build an on-campus stadium failed to gain approval by the University of Alabama board of trustees; this served as a precursor of the program's eventual termination following the 2014 season. UAB announced on June 1, 2015, that their football program will be re-instated. UAB was granted permission by the NCAA to rejoin NCAA Division I FBS level football and would be bowl-eligible when they officially returned to the field in fall 2017.

In its first year back from the two-year hiatus, UAB went 8-5 in 2017 and became bowl eligible after defeating Rice 52–21 at Legion Field. The program's defining moment came on December 1, 2018, when UAB defeated Middle Tennessee to win its first Conference USA championship, and the first conference championship in program history. Two weeks later, the Blazers beat Northern Illinois 37–13 in the Cheribundi Boca Raton Bowl for the program's first bowl victory.

The Blazers moved into the new Protective Stadium on the grounds of the Birmingham–Jefferson Convention Complex in 2021. Alex Mortensen, who was named UAB’s eighth head coach in December 2025, is the program’s current head coach.

=== Soccer ===
==== Men's soccer ====
UAB began its men’s soccer program in 1979. The Blazers have made seven NCAA Tournament appearances, including two Sweet Sixteen berths and an Elite Eight appearance in 1999. Among the program’s most notable victories are a 2–0 upset of No. 1 UCLA in 1997 and a 2–1 win over another top-ranked opponent, SMU, in 2006. The team plays its home matches at PNC Field and has been coached by David Lilly since 2024.

==== Women's soccer ====
Despite launching its women’s soccer program only in 1996, UAB has made multiple NCAA Tournament appearances and earned several national rankings. The team won three Conference USA championships in a ten-year span, most recently in 2006. Lisa Mann has served as head coach from 2023 to 2026. For the 2026 season Mark Hiller served as the interim head coach leading the team to an American Conference championship. The team plays at PNC Field.

=== Baseball ===
UAB’s baseball program began play in 1979. The team has appeared in three NCAA tournaments, the most recent being 2012. The Blazers are coached by Casey Dunn and play their home games at Jerry D. Young Memorial Field, the program’s on-campus stadium since 1984. The team also plays select games at Regions Field, home of the Birmingham Barons, typically for matchups against in-state rivals Alabama and Auburn.

=== Softball ===
Marla Townsend, who was hired in 1998 as the program’s first head coach, led UAB through the 2017 season and compiled a 532 to 507 record. Amanda Ellis served as interim head coach in 2018 and finished 26 to 32 to 1. On June 16, 2018, Jimmy Kolaitis was named the program’s second permanent head coach. Megan Curry is the current head coach.

UAB made five consecutive NCAA tournament appearances from 2010 through 2014 and advanced to the Super Regionals in 2013 after winning the Louisville Regional. There, the Blazers lost two games to Florida by scores of 4 to 3 and 1 to 0. UAB finished the 2013 season ranked No. 16 in the USA Today/NFCA poll and No. 17 in the ESPN.com/USA Softball poll. The program has won one conference regular-season championship, in 2013.

=== Tennis ===
==== Men's tennis ====
Derek Tarr, former-professional South African tennis player, took the helm of the men's tennis team in 1989. Since then, Tarr has led the men's tennis team to numerous top finishes in the Conference USA, including a handful of trips to the NCAA Men's Tennis Tournament. Since 1989, the men's team has accumulated a winning percentage just shy of seventy percent. The UAB men's tennis team has produced numerous player who have gone on to the ATP World Tour. In the 2015–2016 season, the team was ranked as high as #74 by the ITA. The team currently practices at UAB's four-court facility located on-campus and plays home matches at the Lakeshore Foundation Tennis Center located in Homewood, Alabama.

==== Women’s tennis ====
The UAB women's tennis program officially launched its first season of intercollegiate play in 1980 under inaugural head coach Hugh Thomson. Under head coach Mert Ertunga, the team captured three consecutive Great Midwest Conference championships from 1993 through 1995. In 1996 the team won the Conference USA championship, as well as achieving a program-high final ITA national ranking of 39. Since 2014, the team has been led by head coach Mark Tjia.

=== Golf ===
==== Men's golf ====
Frequently ranked among the nation's better collegiate programs including as high as #8 in 2011, the men's golf program has gained considerable recognition. Over the program's history, UAB has made 7 appearances in the NCAA Men's Golf Championship tournament including 6 times in the last 10 years. The UAB golf team has won 2 conference titles including the 2008 Conference USA Championship. Several UAB golfers have gone on to have success as professional golfers including 2010 U.S. Open champion Graeme McDowell and Garrett Osborn. McDowell won the Haskins Award during his senior season in 2002. UAB's golf team is led by coach Charlie Hoyle.

==== Women's golf ====
The UAB women’s golf program began competition in 1985 under head coach Joann Beddow. The team has competed in the Sun Belt Conference, Great Midwest Conference, Conference USA, and the American Conference. The program’s top individual achievement came in 2005, when Brooke Mangan earned an at-large selection to an NCAA Regional. UAB has also produced multiple all-conference golfers, including Heather Lourie, Brooke Mangan, Susan Seabrook, Sydney Snodgrass, and Tia Teiniketo. In recent years, Tia Teiniketo became one of the program’s top performers, setting school records for 18-, 36-, and 54-hole individual scoring. The team is currently coached by Mike McGarry.

=== Volleyball ===
UAB’s women’s volleyball program won its first Conference USA championship in 2006 and made the first NCAA tournament appearance in program history that same season. The Blazers returned to the NCAA tournament in 2008, earning the program’s first at-large bid. The team is currently coached by Betsy Freeburg.

=== Beach Volleyball ===
For beach volleyball UAB competes in C-USA as an affiliate member. Since 2026 Dylynn Miller has been the team's head coach. UAB served as host school for the relocated 2025 NCAA Beach Volleyball National Championship in Gulf Shores, Alabama, after previously helping host the event there annually since 2016. UAB will also host the tournament in Gulf Shores in 2027-31.

== Discontinued sports ==
=== Men’s track and field and cross country ===
In April 1998, athletic director Gene Bartow announced that the school would be cutting the men's track and field and cross country teams, leaving only a women's team.

=== Synchronized swimming ===
The UAB synchronized swimming team was formed in the 1998–99 season and quickly established themselves as dominant in the sport having finished numerous times among the Top 5 teams in the nation. The team has since been dropped as a varsity sport from UAB.

=== Football, bowling and rifle (2014) ===
UAB's president, Ray Watts, announced on December 2, 2014, that the school's football, bowling, and rifle teams would be terminated for economic reasons. However, the school announced on June 1, 2015, that pledges of additional revenue had been made, allowing the terminated programs to be reinstated. Bowling and rifle were reinstated immediately. The intent was for the football program to return for the 2016–2017 school year, although due to massive transfers from the program and the NCAA's recruiting rules, the program would be rebuilt largely with junior college transfers and would return in 2017. With the termination of the football program, UAB had announced the addition men's cross country in order to remain in the NCAA's Division I, but with the return of football, the sport was then dropped.

On June 4, Conference USA announced it would not take any action against UAB now that it has reinstated football, and the school would remain in the conference. The conference stated, "At its fall meeting, the Board expects UAB to submit for review a comprehensive plan addressing the key elements of UAB's football program going forward. No additional action from the Board is expected until that time."

== Championships ==
Conference Championships (11)

- Football (2): 2 – Conference USA
- Men's Basketball (5) 3 – Sun Belt; 2 – Conference USA
- Women's Softball (1): 1 – Conference USA
- Men's Baseball (1): 1 — Conference USA
- Mixed Rifle (2): 2 — Southern Conference

== Rivals ==
=== University of Memphis ===
UAB's primary rival is Memphis, a fellow member of the American Conference. The rivalry dates to both programs' time in Conference USA, when the annual football matchup was known as the Battle for the Bones. The game featured professional and amateur barbecue competitions as part of the pregame festivities, with the winner receiving a traveling 100-pound bronze rack of ribs trophy known as "The Bones."

=== University of North Texas ===
The matchup with North Texas has gained prominence in multiple sports, particularly following both programs’ membership in Conference USA and the American Conference. While the programs have met regularly in football, the series received national attention in men’s basketball when the two teams competed in the 2023 NIT Championship game. This marked a rare instance of conference opponents meeting for a national postseason title. Additionally, on October 14, 1995, UAB football defeated North Texas 19–14 in Denton to earn the program's first victory over a Division I-A opponent.

=== Auburn University ===
In men’s basketball, UAB maintains an in-state rivalry with Auburn Tigers men's basketball, who holds the series lead at 11–10 after winning six straight. The rivalry was on hiatus for several years before a four-game series beginning in 2015, and has been dormant again since 2018.

== Athletic Directors ==
- Gene Bartow (1977–2000)
- Herman Frazier (2000–2002)
- Watson Brown (2002–2005)
- Richard Margison (2005-2007)
- Brian Mackin (2007–2015)
- Mark Ingram (2015–2026)
- Andy Kennedy (2026-present)

== UAB Athletics Foundation ==
The UAB Athletics Foundation, formed in November 2015, is a nonprofit 501(c)(3) organization that supports the university’s athletic program and student-athlete scholarship funding. As of 2022 the foundation has raised more than $100 Million to support UAB Athletics. In 2025, Blazer Boosters, the fundraising arm of the foundation, launched the Competitive Excellence Fund to support student-athletes and supplement the university’s revenue-sharing model.

== Facilities ==
UAB's athletic programs compete at a mix of on-campus and downtown Birmingham venues. Since the reinstatement of football, the university has added or upgraded several major athletic facilities, including Protective Stadium, a football operations center and covered practice facility, renovations to Bartow Arena, and newer venues for soccer, and track and field.

=== Protective Stadium ===
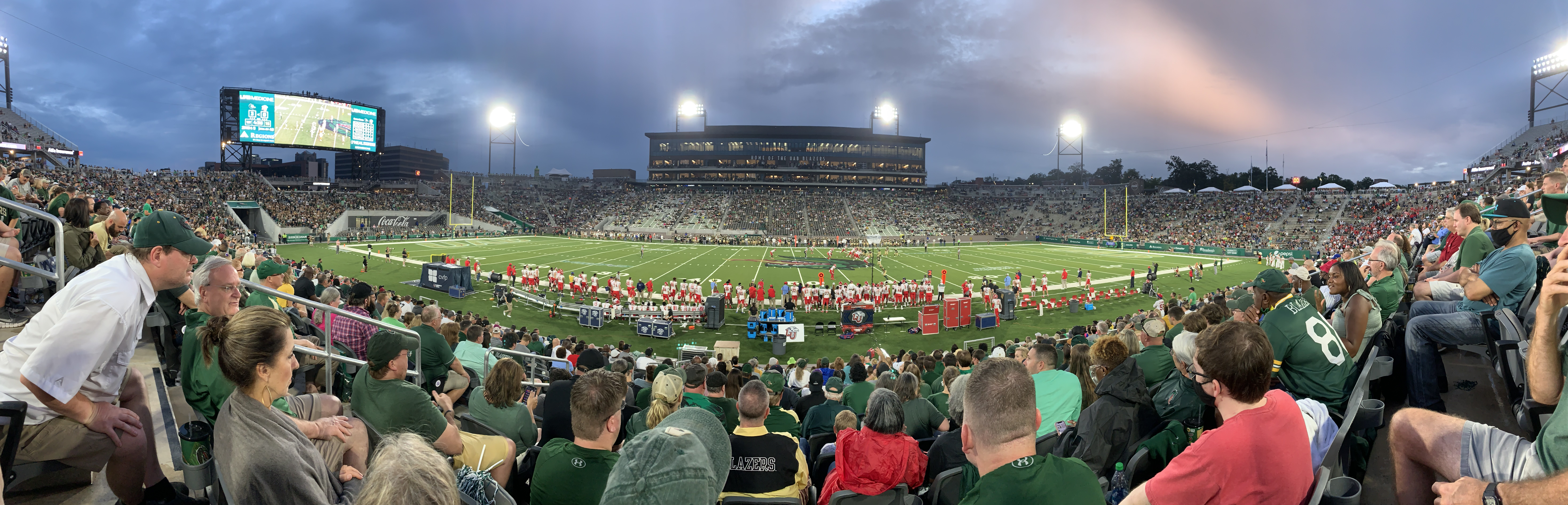
Protective Stadium's debut: UAB vs. Liberty on October 2, 2021

UAB opened Protective Stadium, a $200 million, 47,100-seat stadium, on October 2, 2021, as the Blazers hosted the Liberty Flames. It has five locker rooms including a permanent UAB football locker room, a head coach's office for exclusive UAB use, a staff locker room, and dedicated meeting space for recruiting activities as of 2024.

=== Football Operations Center and Legacy Pavilion ===
As part of the reinstatement of football, UAB raised more than $22.5 million to build a 46,000-square-foot football operations center, an outdoor turf practice field, and the 80,000-square-foot Legacy Pavilion, an open air covered practice facility.

=== Bartow Arena ===
Bartow Arena is an 8,508-seat multi-purpose on-campus arena, used as the home for the UAB Blazers men's and women's basketball teams as well as the women's volleyball team. The arena is named after Gene Bartow. In 2026 the arena will undergo a $15.4 Million renovation that will expand the lobby, add a premium club, and provide student seating along the sideline.

=== Basketball Practice Facility ===
UAB’s basketball practice facility, housed in a renovated 35,000-square-foot Physical Education Building, serves the men’s and women’s basketball programs. It includes two full-length practice courts, locker rooms, player lounges, film rooms, workout rooms, and coaching offices.

=== PNC Field ===
PNC Field (formerly BBVA Field) is an on-campus soccer-specific stadium that has served as the home field for both the UAB Blazers men's and women's soccer teams since its opening in October 2015 as the replacement for West Campus Field.The $7.5 Million expansion of the stadium was facilitated after BBVA USA made a $1.5 million donation to the university for its construction in November 2014.

=== Jerry D. Young Memorial Field ===
Jerry D. Young Memorial Field is the home of UAB baseball. The stadium opened in 1984 and is named after former UAB administrator Jerry D. Young, who played a key role in establishing the program. It seats 1,000. In 2022 artificial turf was installed as the playing surface. UAB plays select games at Regions Field.

=== Mary Bowers Field ===
In 2010, the team moved to an on-campus stadium. The facility was renamed Mary Bowers Field in 2016 in recognition of gifts from Mary and Keith A. Bowers.

=== Track and Field Complex ===
UAB’s track and field teams compete at the UAB Track and Field Facility, an on-campus venue adjacent to PNC Field. Approved in 2018, the $3.5 Million facility is the program’s first dedicated outdoor track and field venue, it was designed with an eight-lane Mondo surface and the capacity to host NCAA, conference, and high school meets.

=== Birmingham CrossPlex ===
UAB’s indoor track and field teams compete at the Birmingham CrossPlex, an off-campus venue owned by the city of Birmingham. The facility has served as the host site for UAB's conference championships for over a decade, including those for Conference USA and the American Conference.

== Historic Facilities ==
=== Legion Field ===
Legion Field served as the home field of the UAB Blazers football team from 1991 to 2020. The Blazers temporarily left Legion Field without a primary tenant during the school's two-year hiatus from football. UAB’s final event at Legion Field was their spring game in April 2021.

=== BJCC Arena ===
The BJCC Arena was also the home of the UAB men's basketball team before it moved into Bartow Arena in 1988.

== Traditions ==
=== Spirit squads ===
The official UAB Spirit Program consists of the UAB Cheerleading Squad, the UAB Golden Girls Dance Team, and the university mascot, Blaze. While the Golden Girls serve as the primary athletic dance team, the Blazerettes dance line operates separately as an auxiliary unit of the Marching Blazers marching band.

In addition to supporting UAB football and basketball on game days, the spirit squads compete nationally at the UCA/UDA College Cheerleading and Dance Team National Championships. Notable performances include a third-place finish by the cheer squad in the 2018 Division I Small Coed category, and a fourth-place national finish in the Division I All-Girl category in 2023.

=== Mascots ===
Blaze The Dragon
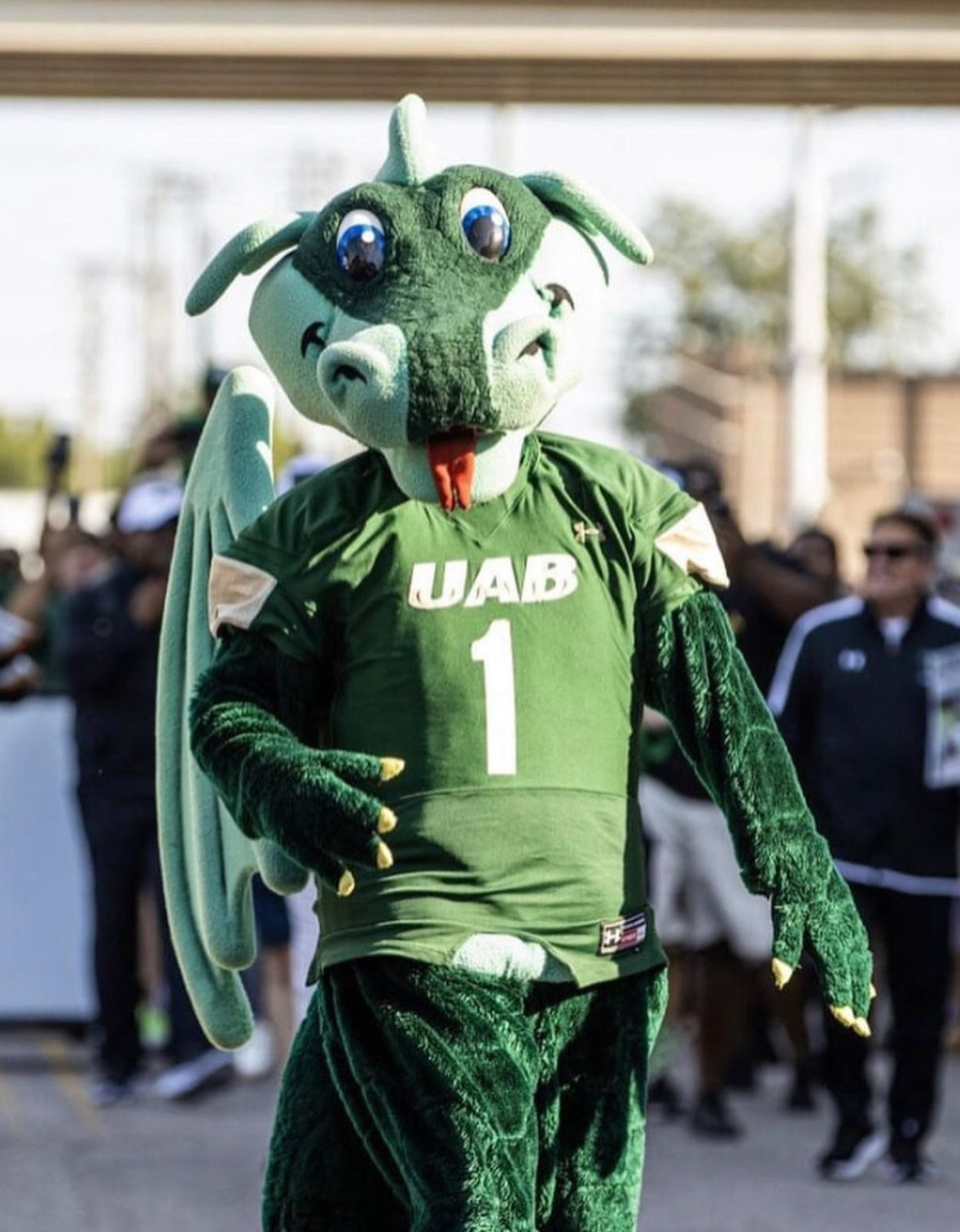
- Blaze outside a UAB Football Game
- University: University of Alabama at Birmingham
- Conference: The American
- Description: Green dragon
- First seen: January 6, 1996

The current UAB mascot is a green dragon named Blaze. Former mascots included a strange cartoonish Nordic warrior named Blaze the Viking in 1993 and a rooster named Beauregard T. Rooster, which remained the school's mascot until 1992 when Coach Gene Bartow thought it would be a good time to change as UAB joined the Great Midwest Conference and a pink unnamed furry dragon in 1978.

=== Nickname origin ===
Tommy Burns, a Birmingham native and UAB history student, recalls being invited to the Student Government Association president’s office to discuss basketball. News that UAB would field a men’s basketball team in the spring of 1978 had the campus and the city buzzing—but the team needed a name.

According to former UAB dean Tennant McWilliams’ book, a group of faculty, staff, and administrators had been circulating “Name Our Team” forms to solicit suggestions from the public, employees, and students. Burns, an early member of UAB’s Sigma Phi Epsilon chapter who actively promoted student life, gathered with a few other students in the SGA office to brainstorm.

“We went around the room,” Burns says. “I came out with ‘Trailblazers,’ because the Portland Trail Blazers were about to win the NBA championship. And somebody said no, because that would be too much like them, and it’s too long—it won’t fit on a marquee.” Other names were floated, including Barons, since the original Birmingham Barons baseball team was no longer in existence at the time. “This went on for a while,” Burns says.

Then he circled back to his original idea and offered a shortened version: “Blazers.” As Burns puts it, “My thought was that this was the first team; they were blazing the trail.”

At the session’s conclusion, the group selected four finalists—Blazers, Barons, Titans, and Warriors. The campus overwhelmingly voted in favor of Blazers as the moniker for its intercollegiate teams in January 1978.

=== Student Support Organization ===
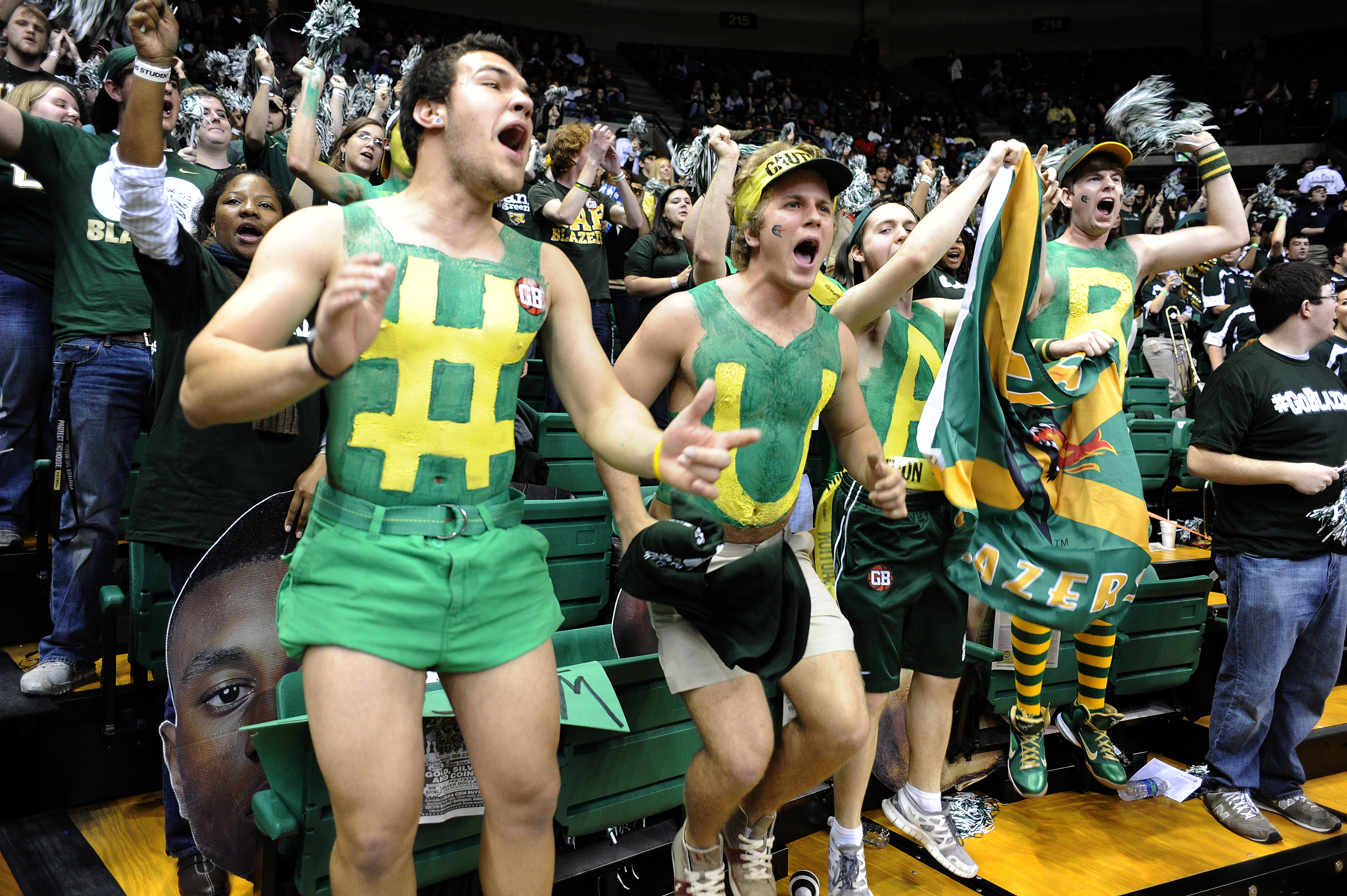
UAB Gang Green

The official student supporter group is known as Gang Green.

=== Charity Events ===
UAB athletics maintain deep ties to the university's medical mission, highlighted by the Bartow Classic (Basketball) and Children's Harbor Game (Football), which are held annually to support charitable healthcare causes.

== Blazers ISP Radio Network ==
UAB athletic events can be heard on the following stations:

- WUHT-FM 107.7 – Birmingham/Tuscaloosa/Gadsden/Anniston/Cullman
- WJOX-FM 94.5 – Birmingham/Tuscaloosa/Selma/Demopolis
- WPAS-FM 89.1 – Mobile/Biloxi/Pascagoula/Gulf Shores
- WGMP AM 1170 – Montgomery/Prattville/Selma/Greenville/Troy
- WTKI AM 1450 – Huntsville/Madison
- WIEZ AM 1490 – Decatur/Hartselle/Moulton|Athens
- WSGN FM 98.3 – Talladega/Ashland/Oxford/Alexander City
- WKLS FM 105.9 – Centre/Piedmont/Collinsville/Cedar Bluff
- WJOX AM 690 – Birmingham/Huntsville/Montgomery
- WACT AM 1420 – Tuscaloosa/Brent/Eutaw
