= UAB Blazers beach volleyball =

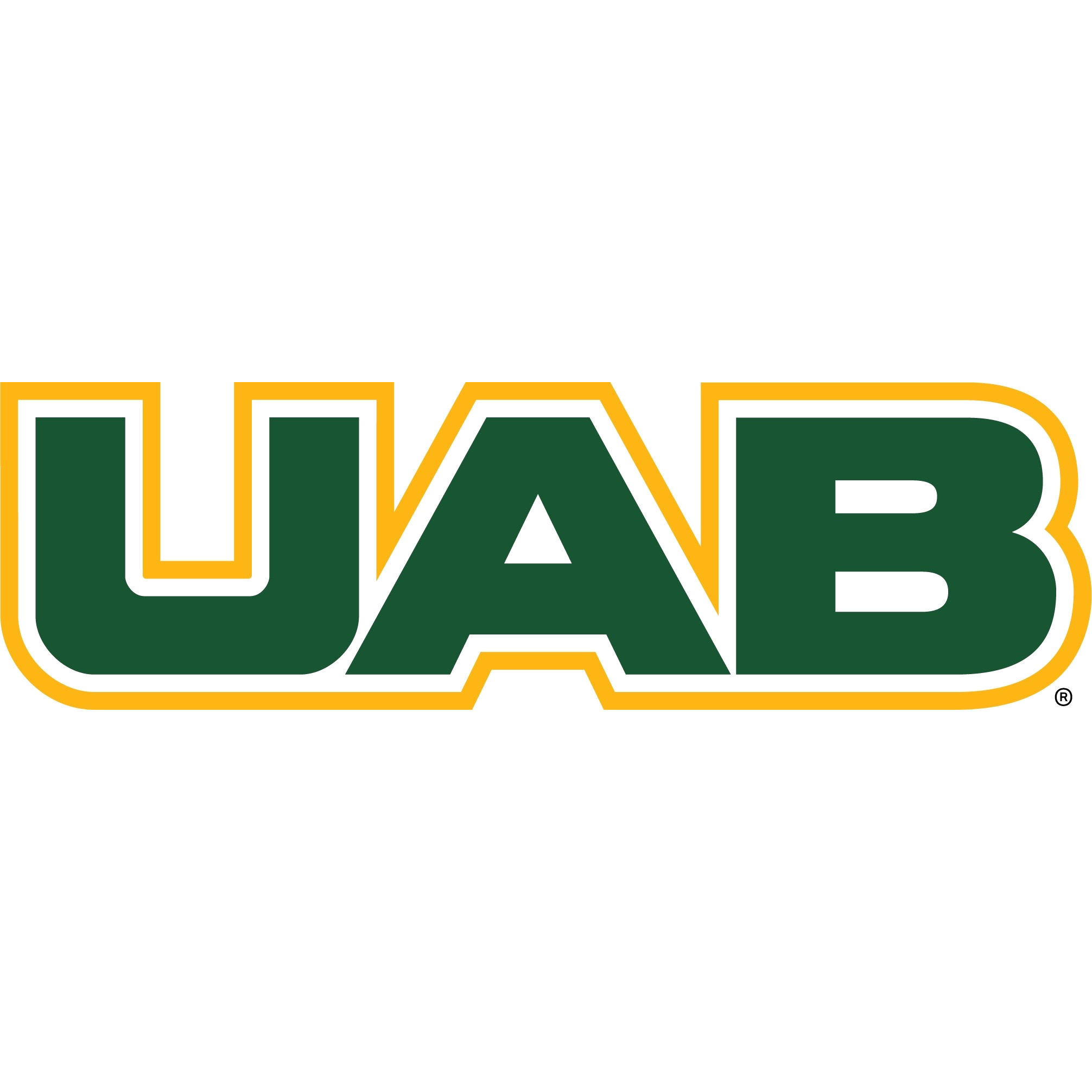
- University: University of Alabama at Birmingham
- Athletic director: Mark Ingram
- Head coach: Dylynn Miller (1st season)
- Conference: C-USA
- Location: Birmingham, Alabama
- Home arena: UAB Beach Volleyball Courts
- Nickname: Blazers

The UAB Blazers beach volleyball team represents the University of Alabama at Birmingham (UAB) in NCAA Division I beach volleyball. The program, which began competition in 2012, is a member of the Conference USA as an affiliate member and plays its home matches at the UAB Beach Volleyball Courts in Birmingham, Alabama. The team is coached by Dylynn Miller.

UAB hosted the first-ever sanctioned NCAA collegiate beach volleyball match (then called sand volleyball) on March 3, 2012. In that historic home opener in Birmingham, the Blazers were defeated by the Florida State Seminoles 5-0.

== History ==
The program was established in 2012 under head coach Hal Messersmith. In its inaugural season, the duo of Kirsten Gallagher and Heather Thomas became the first UAB pair to compete at the AVCA National Championships. The following year, Kiriana Hirini and Bethanie Thomas became the first Blazer tandem to win a match at the national tournament.

The Blazers have moved through several conference affiliations, including the Coastal Collegiate Sports Association (CCSA) and Conference USA (C-USA). Significant milestones include a 2018 victory over No. 8 South Carolina and reaching the semifinals of the 2023 C-USA Championship after defeating No. 12 FIU. In August 2023 UAB hired Delaney Rose to be the team's head coach.

In 2026, UAB achieved the most successful season in program history, finishing with a record 26 wins and a 16-match winning streak. The Blazers reached the semifinals of the Conference USA Championships, led by the top-court duo of Jasmine Haas and Olivia Stant, who set a single-season program record with 29 victories as a pair. Following the 2026 season Delaney Rose left UAB to become the head coach at the University of North Florida. UAB promoted Dylynn Miller to Head Coach on June 3rd, 2026. Miller played for UAB from 2020 to 2022, and served as team captain in 2021 and 2022.

UAB has played a significant role in hosting the NCAA Beach Volleyball National Championship in Gulf Shores, Alabama, assisting with the event annually since 2016. The university served as the host institution for the 2025 championship and will continue in that role from 2027 through 2031.

== Conference affiliation ==
- Independent - Division I-A (2012–2015)
- Coastal Collegiate Sports Association (2016–2021)
- Conference USA (2022–present)

== Head coaches ==
Coach	Years	Record	Pct.
Hal Messersmith	2012–2013	16–12	.571
Bailey Coleman	2014–2016	25–35	.417
Ashley Hardee	2017	12–19	.387
Kyra Iannone	2018–2020	27–36	.428
Terri Del Conte	2021–2023	47–49	.490
Delaney Rose	2024–2026	66–38	.635
Total	15 seasons	193–189	.505

Records as of the conclusion of the 2026 regular season. 2020 season was shortened due to COVID-19.

== Year by year results ==
Year	Coach	Overall	Conf.	Conf. Record	Postseason
2012	Hal Messersmith	6–4	Independent	—	AVCA Nationals
2013	Hal Messersmith	10–8	Independent	—	AVCA Nationals
2014	Bailey Coleman	5–9	Independent	—	AVCA Nationals
2015	Bailey Coleman	7–8	Independent	—	
2016	Bailey Coleman	13–18	CCSA	2–8	
2017	Ashley Hardee	12–19	CCSA	0–6	
2018	Kyra Iannone	8–15	CCSA	1–6	
2019	Kyra Iannone	14–17	CCSA	3–9	
2020	Kyra Iannone	5–4	CCSA	2—3	Season canceled due to COVID-19
2021	Terri Del Conte	12–15	CCSA	5–9	
2022	Terri Del Conte	17–18	C-USA	3–4	
2023	Terri Del Conte	18–16	C-USA	2–1	
2024	Delaney Rose	19–15	C-USA	2–3	
2025	Delaney Rose	21–12	C-USA	3–2	
2026	Delaney Rose	26–11	C-USA	5–0	
Total		193–189			

Records as of the conclusion of the 2026 regular season.

== Facilities ==
UAB plays its home matches at the UAB Beach Volleyball Courts on campus in Birmingham. The courts hosted the beach volleyball tournament for the 2025 World Police and Fire Games.
