= UAB Blazers track and field =

College track and field team

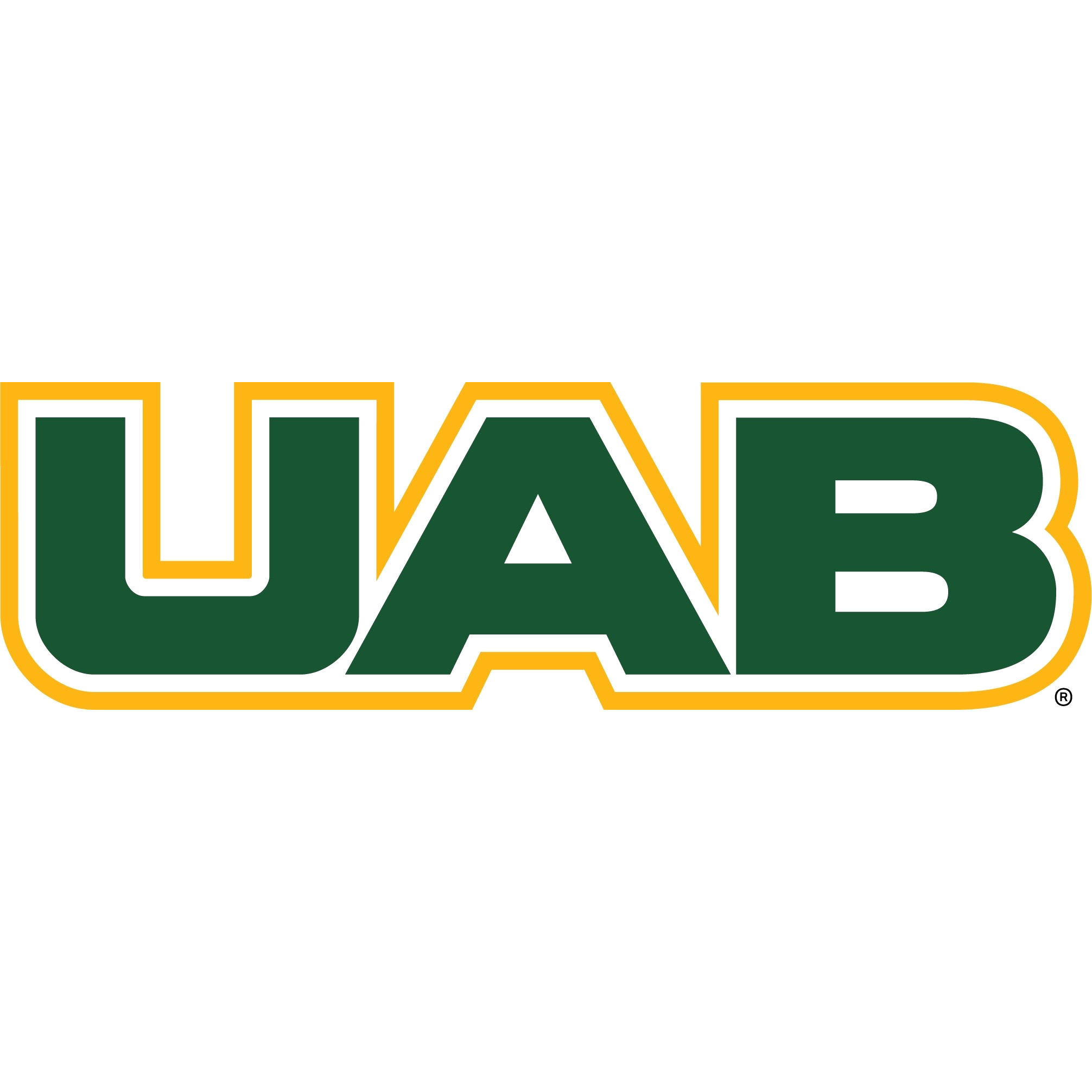
- University: University of Alabama at Birmingham
- Head coach: Kurt Thomas
- Conference: The American
- Location: Birmingham, Alabama
- Outdoor track: UAB Track and Field Facility
- Nickname: Blazers
- Colors: UAB Green and UAB Gold

The UAB Blazers track and field team is the track and field program that represents the University of Alabama at Birmingham. The Blazers compete in NCAA Division I as a member of the American Conference. The team is based in Birmingham, Alabama, at the UAB Track and Field Facility.

The program is coached by Kurt Thomas. The track and field program officially encompasses four teams because the NCAA considers men's and women's indoor track and field and outdoor track and field as separate sports.

In April 1998, athletic director Gene Bartow announced that the school would be cutting the men's track and field and cross country teams, leaving only a women's team. Vonetta Flowers earned the most All-American finishes on the team before becoming a bobsledder and winning a gold medal in the 2002 Olympic two-woman race. In 2023, Olympic sprinter Muna Lee was hired as an assistant coach.

== Postseason ==
As of August 2025, a total of 0 men and 4 women have achieved individual first-team All-American status for the team at the Division I men's outdoor, women's outdoor, men's indoor, or women's indoor national championships (using the modern criteria of top-8 placing regardless of athlete nationality).

First team NCAA All-Americans
Team	Championships	Name	Event	Place	Ref.
Women's	1988 Outdoor	Angela King	Heptathlon	8th	
Women's	1995 Indoor	Vonetta Jeffery	200 meters	8th	
Women's	1995 Outdoor	Vonetta Jeffery	100 meters	5th	
Women's	1995 Outdoor	Vonetta Jeffery	200 meters	8th	
Women's	1996 Indoor	Vonetta Jeffery	200 meters	8th	
Women's	1996 Indoor	Vonetta Jeffery	Long jump	4th	
Women's	1996 Outdoor	Vonetta Jeffery	Long jump	5th	
Women's	2008 Indoor	Elizabeth Ambrus	5000 meters	8th	
Women's	2014 Indoor	Elinor Kirk	3000 meters	3rd	
Women's	2014 Outdoor	Elinor Kirk	5000 meters	7th	
Women's	2014 Outdoor	Elinor Kirk	10,000 meters	2nd	

== See also ==
- Category:UAB Blazers women's track and field athletes (1)
