= Eric Sorscher =

American medical researcher

Eric Sorscher is an American medical researcher whose primary focus is cystic fibrosis. Some of his research interests include understanding the function of cystic fibrosis transmembrane conductance regulator (CFTR) and its associated gene, as well as understanding mutations in the CFTR gene.

From 1994–2015 he was the director of the Gregory Fleming James Cystic Fibrosis Research Center at the University of Alabama at Birmingham. In 2015 he joined the Center for Cystic Fibrosis and Airways Disease Research (CF-AIR) at Emory University.

He graduated from Yale College and Harvard Medical School.
