= Joseph F. Volker =

American dentist and academic administrator

Joseph F. Volker, (1913–1989) was the first chief executive of the University of Alabama at Birmingham, serving in that capacity from 1966 to 1976. Afterwards, he was the first Chancellor of the University of Alabama System, from 1976 to 1982.

Volker served as dean of the Birmingham-based Alabama School of Dentistry from 1948 to 1962, except for a one-year break in 1961 as director of the Arizona Medical School Study. He became vice president for Health Affairs in 1962. In 1966, the University of Alabama Medical Center and the College of General Studies (formerly the Birmingham Extension Center) were merged as the University of Alabama in Birmingham. Volker became head of the merged institution as "Vice President of Birmingham Affairs," reflecting that University of Alabama at Birmingham was still treated as an offsite department of the main campus in Tuscaloosa. With the creation of the University of Alabama System in 1969, the University of Alabama at Birmingham became a fully autonomous four-year institution, and Volker's title was changed to "president."

As the first president of University of Alabama at Birmingham, he is remembered for his statement "We would do Birmingham a great disservice if we dream too-little dreams.",

Volker earned his Doctor of Dental Surgery degree from Indiana University School of Dentistry and his MS and PhD degrees in biochemistry from the University of Rochester, where he conducted groundbreaking studies on the use of fluorides in the prevention of dental decay".
