= Adrienne C. Lahti =

American behavioural neurobiologist

- Born: Belgium

Academic background
- Education: MD, 1978, University of Liège

Adrienne C. Lahti is an American behavioural neurobiologist. She is the F. Cleveland Kinney Endowed Chair in the Department of Psychiatry and Behavioral Neurobiology at the University of Alabama at Birmingham.

== Early life and education ==
Lahti completed her education at the University of Liège before travelling to North America to complete her residency training in Psychiatry at the University of Michigan.

== Career ==
Upon completing her residency, Lahti started her academic career at the University of Maryland School of Medicine as a research assistant professor. She eventually left the school in 2006 to take up an associate professor position at the University of Alabama at Birmingham (UAB) Department of Psychiatry and Behavioral Neurobiology. In 2014, Lahti was appointed the Patrick H. Linton Professorship in Psychiatry in the School of Medicine Department of Psychiatry and Behavioral Neurobiology. The following year, she co-authored a study identifying pathways that may cause seizures and shorten survival for patients with severe brain tumors. She assisted with the magnetic resonance imaging examining the association of glutamate with anti-psychotic drugs.

While serving in the role as the F. Cleveland Kinney Endowed Chair in the Department of Psychiatry and Behavioral Neurobiology, Lahti was appointed the co-director of the UAB's Comprehensive Neuroscience Center. She was also the co-recipient of the 2017 Kempf Fund Award with Nina Kraguljac for their schizophrenia research. On March 18, 2020, Lahti was named the interim chair of Department of Psychiatry and Behavioral Neurobiology.

== Selected publications ==
- Subanesthetic doses of ketamine stimulate psychosis in schizophrenia (1995)
- Decisional capacity for informed consent in schizophrenia research (2000)
- Effects of ketamine in normal and schizophrenic volunteers (2001)
