= Blaze (UAB mascot) =

University mascot depicted by a dragon

Blaze The Dragon
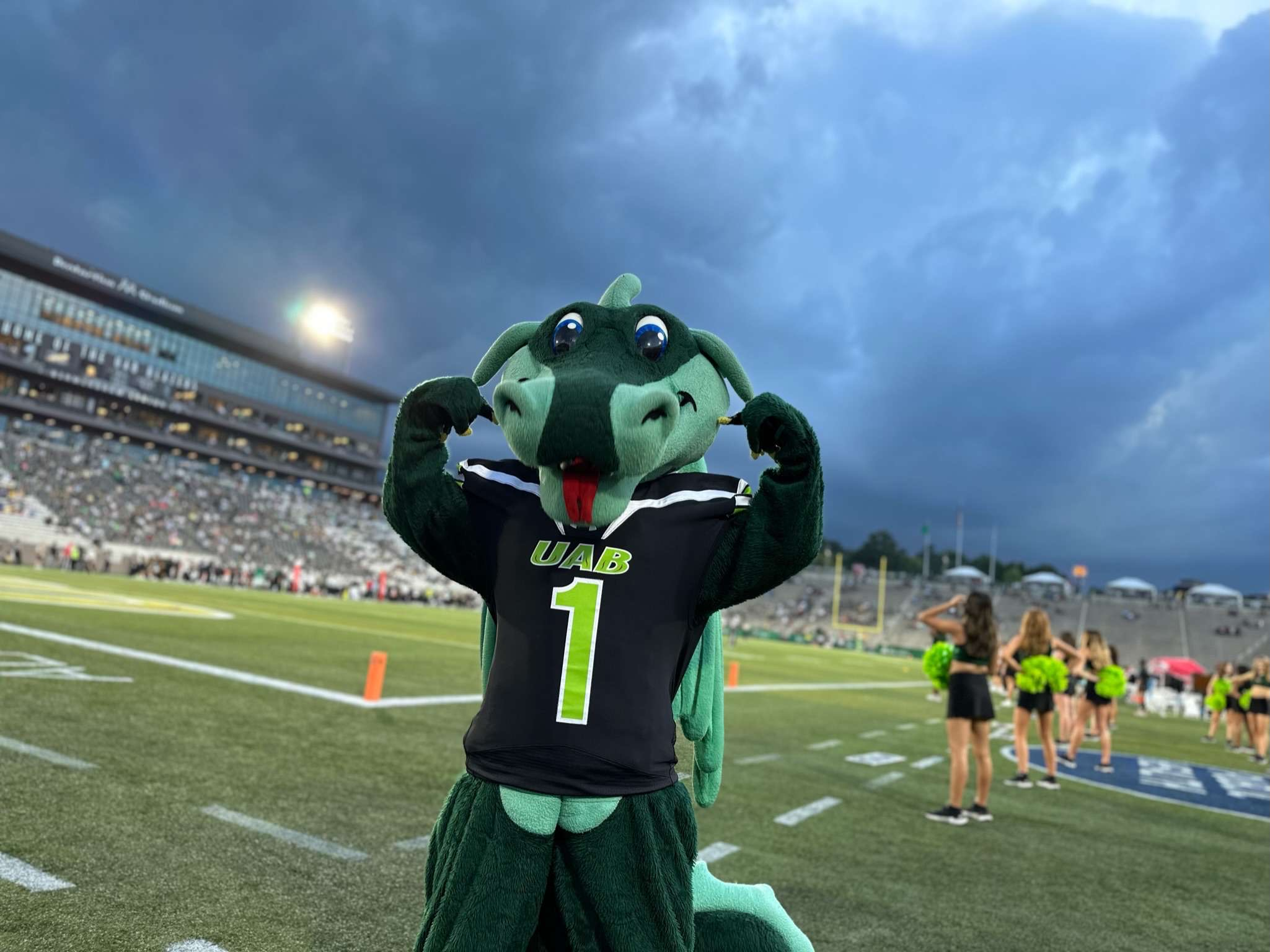
- Blaze outside a UAB Football Game
- University: University of Alabama at Birmingham
- Conference: The American
- Description: Green dragon
- First seen: January 6, 1996

Blaze (officially Blaze the Dragon) is the mascot of the University of Alabama at Birmingham's athletics teams. The mascot is based on a fire-breathing European dragon.

== History ==
UAB's first mascot, an unnamed furry pink dragon, was introduced in 1978 during a men's basketball game; this mascot disappeared the following season due to unpopularity. From 1979 to 1992, UAB introduced another mascot, a chicken named "Beauregard T. Rooster," originally worn by UAB employee Frank Sutherland as a Halloween costume; the use of this mascot was halted due to concern of trademark infringement lawsuit by San Diego's Chicken's. In 1993, the school voted a new mascot, a Viking warrior named "Blazer the Warrior;" this mascot was retired the next season due to children being scared of the mascot.

On January 6, 1996, "Blaze", a friendly green dragon, was introduced at a basketball game. "Blaze" is considered a member of the spirit squads and appears at all football and basketball games. Blaze's head has appeared on the sides of UAB's football helmets since 1996, when the team moved up to Division I-A.
