= Ray L. Watts =

American university president

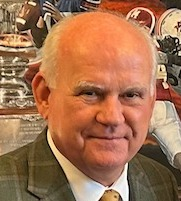
- Watts in November, 2023

7th President of the University of Alabama at Birmingham
- Incumbent
- Assumed office February 8, 2013
- Preceded by: Carol Garrison; Richard Marchase (interim)

Personal details
- Born: Ray Lannom Watts; December 18, 1953 (age 72) Birmingham, Alabama
- Scientific career
- Education: University of Alabama at Birmingham; Washington University in St. Louis
- Fields: neurology
- Workplaces: Emory University; University of Alabama at Birmingham

Ray Lannom Watts (born December 18, 1953) is an American physician-researcher in neurology, educator and university administrator. Watts has served as the seventh president of the University of Alabama at Birmingham (UAB) since February 2013 and is the longest-serving president in UAB history.

== Education and early career, research and service ==
A Birmingham native and graduate of West End High School, Watts earned a bachelor's degree in biomedical and electrical engineering from UAB in 1976. Four years later, he graduated from Washington University School of Medicine.

Watts then completed a neurology residency, medical internship, and clinical fellowships at Harvard Medical School and Massachusetts General Hospital, followed by a two-year medical staff fellowship at the National Institutes of Health (NIH).

In 1986, Watts joined the faculty of Emory University School of Medicine as director of a team that helped create an internationally renowned research and clinical center for Parkinson's disease and other movement disorders.

In 2003, Watts returned to UAB as the John N. Whitaker Professor and Chairman of the Department of Neurology. There he led the development of an interdisciplinary research program aimed at translating scientific breakthroughs into promising new therapies for neurodegenerative diseases and played a key role in the establishment of the UAB Comprehensive Neuroscience Center. He also served as president of the University of Alabama Health Services Foundation from 2005 to 2010. In 2010, Watts became Senior Vice President and Dean of the UAB Heersink School of Medicine, and later was named the James C. Lee Jr. Endowed Chair.

In February 2013, Watts was named UAB's seventh president by unanimous vote of the University of Alabama System Board of Trustees. He has also served as chair of the UAB Health System Board of Directors and chair of Southern Research Board of Directors since 2013.

Watts has co-edited three editions of "Movement Disorders: Neurologic Principles and Practice." He has authored or co-authored more than 130 peer-reviewed research articles published in journals including Annals of Neurology, Cell Transplantation, Experimental Neurology, Human Molecular Genetics, the Journal of the American Medical Association, JAMA Archives of Neurology & Psychiatry, Journal of Genomics, Journal of Medicinal Chemistry, Journal of Neuroscience, Journal of Neurosurgery, Movement Disorders, the New England Journal of Medicine, and Neurology. Watts was the lead author of the paper "Randomized, blind, controlled trial of transdermal rotigotine in early Parkinson disease" published in January 2007 in the journal Neurology, and the second author of the paper "Transdermal Rotigotine Double-blind, Placebo-Controlled Trial in Parkinson Disease" published in May 2007 in Archives of Neurology (the first author, Jankovic, was the second author of the first published paper). The editor of Archives of Neurology, upon learning of the earlier publication, compared the two writings and deemed them to be "redundant publications...additional information [in the second publication] represents a minor contribution". The second paper cited the first paper in a late draft after questions about the methodology arose, but did not mention the similarity of the data . In response, the authors of the papers stated that they strongly disagreed with the editor's conclusions, and believe the focus of the two papers are different. The authors also say that the primary author was not aware of the acceptance of the earlier paper during submission of the second paper. The authors state that the Neurology paper was accepted October 24, 2006, and the Archives paper was submitted in December 2006. The authors did admit "in retrospect, we should have notified the Archives about the complementary article in Neurology" .

Watts is a member of American Neurological Association; American Academy of Neurology; Society for Neuroscience; Alpha Omega Alpha; Movement Disorders Society; International Brain Research Organization; Medical Association of State of Alabama; and the Alabama Academy of Neurology.

Watts served as chair of the Birmingham Business Alliance (BBA) for an unprecedented two consecutive terms (2016 and 2017) and remains a board member. He has also served and continues to serve on boards of other organizations aimed at improved education, economic development, and promotion of the arts and culture, including Community Foundation of Greater Birmingham, Prosper Birmingham, Innovation Depot, Southern Research, Alys Stephens Center for the Performing Arts (chair, corporate board), Alabama Symphony Orchestra (ASO) (2009-2017), and Doctors for the ASO Giving Society (now Physicians & Faculty for the ASO) (founding chair, 2009–2013).

== UAB presidency (2013–present) ==
=== 2013–2019 ===
Upon taking office, Watts initiated the most comprehensive, campus-wide strategic planning process in UAB history. The plan comprised individual strategic plans from all of UAB's schools as well as the UAB Honors College and UAB Athletics, and advanced the UAB Campus Master Plan for facilities. Watts said of the ongoing strategic planning process in May 2014, "Established institutional priorities, as well as those of individual schools, departments and service lines, will allow us to confidently invest most heavily in the programs and people that will best advance our mission – where the most impactful achievements and benefits will be realized for the greater good."

In December 2014 UAB disbanded its football program and, as the rationale for the decision, Watts cited exorbitant operational costs and substantial investments that would be necessary to make UAB football financially sustainable. "While this will be a challenging transition for the UAB family, the financial picture made our decision very clear," Watts said. "We will not cut the current athletic budget, but in order to invest at least another $49 million to keep football over the next five years, we would have to redirect funds away from other critical areas of importance like education, research, patient care or student services." On January 15, 2015, a two-thirds majority of the UAB faculty senate voted no-confidence in the leadership of Ray Watts as president of the university. The resolution stated that "decisions by President Ray Watts were exercised in a manner that demonstrates no respect for, or commitment to, shared governance" and that changes in academic operations, faculty benefits, and the disbanding of the UAB Football, Bowling, and Rifle teams were examples of this. Additionally on March 23, 2015, UAB's National Alumni Society issued a statement of no confidence and demanded Watts' immediate resignation. On June 1, 2015, Watts announced steps would be taken to reinstate UAB football, rifle and bowling after campus and community leaders, the City of Birmingham and private donors pledged significant funds to reestablish and sustain the three programs. "The biggest single difference is we now have tangible commitments for additional support that we have never had before," Watts told reporters. "Without that additional support, we could not have maintained a balanced budget moving forward." An initiative called "Finish the Drive" began on August 18, 2015, to conduct further fundraising for UAB Athletics. UAB Football returned to competition in the fall 2017 season.

=== 2020–2023 ===
In March 2020, as COVID-19 began to impact the U.S., Watts and other senior administrators of UAB and UAB Health System established an Incident Command Committee holding daily virtual meetings to coordinate the institution's leadership role in combating the pandemic, which included immediately partnering with the University of Alabama System as well as local and state agencies to develop and implement a statewide response; transition on campus to a Limited Business Model and online instruction; development of a central website, UAB United, as a resource of COVID-related information for the campus and larger community; research and clinical trials of potential treatments and vaccines; development of an exposure notification app used state-wide; and ultimately the treatment of more than 7,000 COVID-positive patients, delivery of more than 272,000 vaccinations, and numerous interviews with UAB experts in national and international media. Watts commented in May 2020, "We have worked very hard to respond to the pandemic from every aspect of our organization. I'm proud of the people of UAB: frontline health care workers, researchers, support staff, faculty, and students as we adapt to a new reality. We are also hard at work planning for when this is over, so that UAB will be an even stronger and better organization to serve the people of Alabama."

In December 2020, Watts officially signed the Okanagan Charter, making UAB the first internationally recognized Health Promoting University] (HPU) in the U.S.

Fiscal year 2021 continued what Watts called "the most successful era of research funding in UAB history," with a record $648 million in research awards (an increase of 46% since FY2016), putting UAB 17th (top 4%) among public universities in federal R&D expenditures and 11th (top 4%) in funding from the National Institutes of Health (NIH). Additionally, UAB Hospital had grown to become the 8th largest hospital in the U.S. (1,207 beds), passing Mount Sinai (1,139 beds) and Johns Hopkins (1,162 beds).

Birmingham Business Journal named Watts 2021 CEO of the Year.

On January 22, 2022, UAB announced that Heersink School of Medicine researchers and surgeons had successfully tested the world's first human preclinical model for transplanting genetically modified pig kidneys into humans. Watts called this major breakthrough in xenotransplantation "a milestone in medicine...that could provide a robust, sustainable supply of lifesaving organs to patients worldwide."

=== 2024 – Present ===
On Nov. 1, 2024, UAB Health System (UABHS) assumed ownership of Ascension St. Vincent's Health System in central Alabama. Previously, the UAB/Ascension St. Vincent's Alliance had launched in 2020 and UAB had announced in June 2024 that the UA System Board of Trustees had approved an agreement with Ascension to seek the necessary approvals and work toward satisfying closing conditions. Under the agreement, UABHS assumed ownership of all Ascension St. Vincent's sites of care, including the hospitals at Birmingham, Blount, Chilton, East and St. Clair, as well as the One Nineteen Campus, the Trussville Freestanding Emergency Department, and imaging centers and other clinics that are part of Ascension Medical Group. The transaction included Ascension St. Vincent's services, facilities, caregivers and associates, including a network of providers serving the region. Roughly 5,200 St. Vincent's employees transitioned into the UAB System as part of the merger, with titles and compensation remaining the same for employees and existing vendor contracts remaining in effect.

Watts, a 1976 honors graduate of UAB School of Engineering, was inducted into the Alabama Engineering Hall of Fame in recognition of his significant contributions to the advancement of engineering and technology.

== Personal life ==
During his neurology residency at Massachusetts General Hospital, Watts met his wife Nancy Watts (née Angelo), a nurse who had also earned a slot there. The couple worked together as doctor and nurse at Massachusetts General and later at Emory University and UAB, treating patients and educating families and donors about Parkinson's disease.

The Wattses have five children and 11 grandchildren.

== Awards and Honors ==
- Alabama Academy of Honor, inducted November 3, 2025
- Birmingham Business Journal Power 60 Most Influential Executives, 2020–present
- Business Alabama CEO of the Year, 2025
- Induction into Alabama Engineering Hall of Fame, 2025
- Birmingham Business Journal, CEO of the Year Award, 2021
- America's Top Doctors, Castle and Connolly, 2000–present
- Best Doctors in America, Woodward and White, 1994–present
- Birmingham's Best Doctors, Birmingham Magazine, 2003–present
- University of Alabama Medical Alumni Association Distinguished Service Award, 2014
- UAB Distinguished Alumni Award 2007
- Who's Who in Health Care, Birmingham Business Journal, 2007
- Raymond D. Adams Lecture, Harvard/Massachusetts General Hospital, March 11, 2004
- Atlanta's Best Doctors, Atlanta Magazine, 2001-2003
