= Shin Joong Oh =

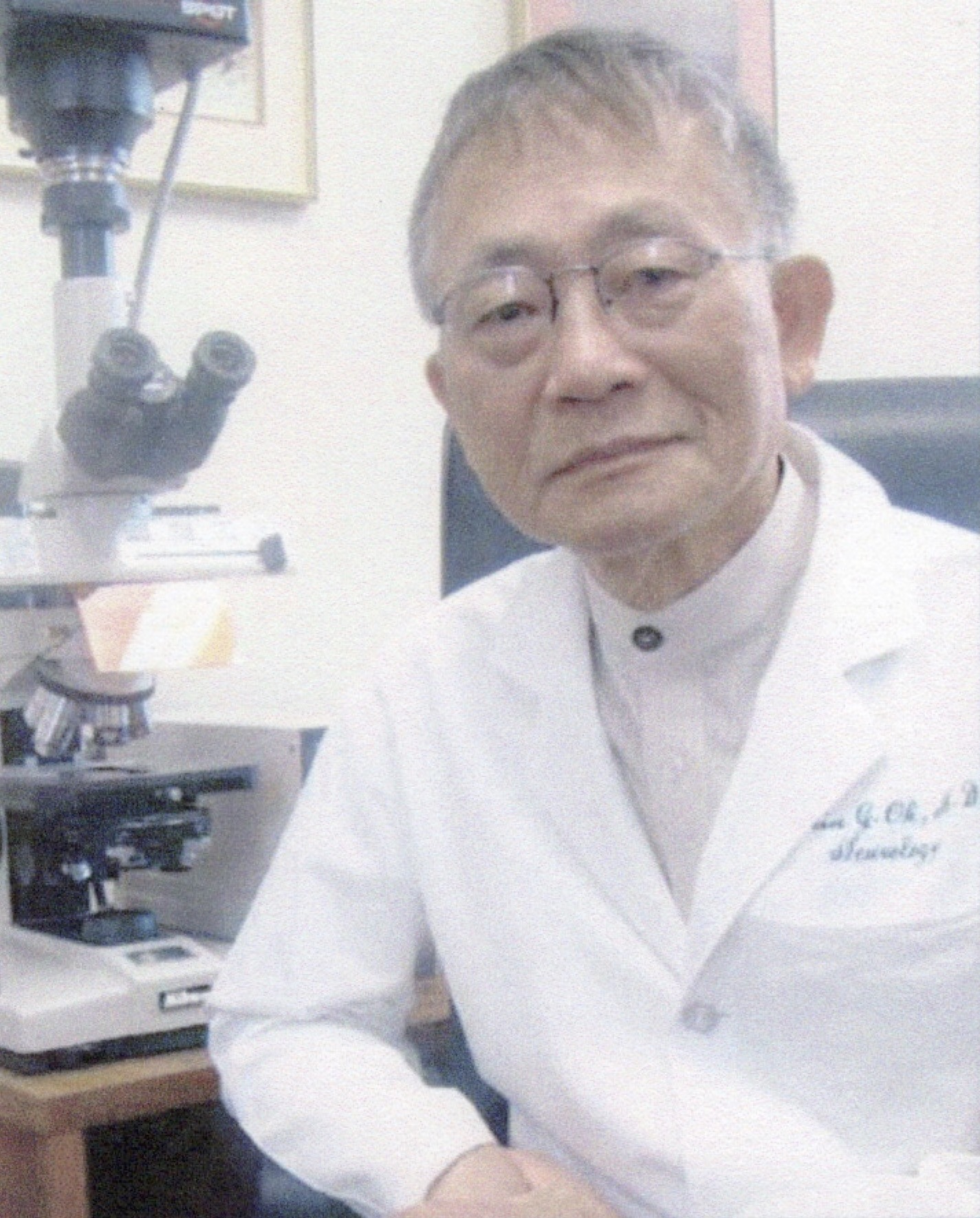
- Born: South Korea
- Citizenship: South Korea, United States
- Education: Seoul National University
- Occupation: Distinguished Professor Emeritus
- Known for: Contributions to neurology and electrodiagnostic medicine

Shin Joong Oh is a South Korean-American physician who is Distinguished Professor of Neurology Emeritus at The University of Alabama at Birmingham in the United States. Oh is a clinician, researcher, and educator known for his contributions to the fields of neurology and electrodiagnostic medicine, particularly electromyography. He retired in 2014.

== Early life and education ==
Oh was born in Haeju, Korea in 1936 and moved to South Korea in 1947. He received his M.D. degree at the Seoul National University (SNU) College of Medicine in 1960. He completed residencies in neurology at the SNU National Medical Center in Korea and at Georgetown University in Washington, D.C. in the United States in 1970.

== Career ==
Oh joined the faculty of the University of Alabama at Birmingham (UAB) School of Medicine in 1970. He was given the title of Distinguished Professor of Neurology and Professor of Pathology in 2007. During his tenure, Oh served as chief of Neurology at the Veterans Affairs Medical Center, as director of the Electromyography and Evoked potential Laboratory, and as director of the Muscle and Nerve Histopathology Laboratory By serving in these positions for 43 years, he held one of the longest neurology tenures in American medicine. He also served as director of the UAB Muscular Dystrophy Association Clinic and the Myasthenia Gravis Clinic and is a fellow member of the American Association of Neuromuscular & Electrodiagnostic Medicine (AANEM), American Academy of Neurology, and American Neurological Association.

In 2009, to recognize his accomplishments, the UAB Muscle and Nerve Histpathology Laboratory was renamed to "The Dr. Shin J. Oh Muscle and Nerve Histopathology Laboratory at UAB" by the board of the University of Alabama.

In 1994, Oh and his wife, M. Kim Oh, established an endowed lectureship through the UAB Department of Neurology entitled "The Oh Lecture on Neuromuscular Diseases." The couple established this lectureship in memory of their late daughter, Julie Oh.

== Research and contributions ==
As of 2015, Oh had published 230 articles, 28 books and book chapters, and 237 abstracts, some of which have become classics of the field. Notable contributions to the fields of neurology and electrodiagnostic medicine include:

- Coining the term “MLOS” (Myashenia Gravis Lambert Eaton Overlap Syndrome) for cases of “Myasthenia gravis (MG) with electrophysiological characteristics of Lambert-Eaton myasthenic syndrome (LEMS)(LOS)."
- The report of five newly termed disease entities:
1. Subacute inflammatory demyelinating neuropathy (SIDP)
2. Chronic demyelinating sensory neuropathy as a form of chronic inflammatory demyelinating neuropathy (CIDP)
3. Chronic inflammatory axonal polyneuropathy (CIAP)
4. Uniform type I fiber congenital neuromuscular disease as a new disease entity
5. A second case of Danon disease
- Inventing "near-nerve needle nerve conduction of the digital and interdigital nerves" (a conduction technique for probing nerves in the foot) to confirm the diagnosis of various plantar neuropathies including tarsal tunnel syndrome.
- Inventing "on-nerve needle sensory nerve conduction of the sural nerve" (another nerve probing technique) to make electrophysiological and histological correlation of biopsied diseased nerves.
- Establishing new electrophysiological diagnostic criteria for Lambert–Eaton myasthenic syndrome (LEMS) by statistical analysis of sensitivity and specificity of the repetitive nerve conduction test in MG and LEMS.

=== Textbook publications ===
- Shin J. Oh (2001). Color Atlas of Nerve Biopsy Pathology. Boca Raton: CRC Press. ISBN 1420039806.
- Shin J. Oh (1998). Principles of Clinical Electromyography: Case Studies. Baltimore: Williams & Wilkins. ISBN 0-6831-8106-8.
- Shin J. Oh (1988). Electromyography: neuromuscular transmission studies. Baltimore: Williams & Wilkins. ISBN 0-6830-6643-9.
- Shin J. Oh (2003). Clinical Electromyography: Nerve Conduction Studies. Philadelphia: Lippincott Williams & Wilkins. ISBN 0-7817-3681-1.

=== Awards and recognitions ===
- Lifetime Achievement Award, AANEM (2015)
- Naming of the Dr. Shin J. Oh Muscle and Nerve Histopathology Laboratory, Board of University of Alabama (2009)
- Distinguished Professor, UAB (2007)
- Distinguished Researcher Award, AANEM (2006)
