= Wendy Gunther-Canada =

American academic

Wendy Gunther-Canada is a professor in the Department of Government at the University of Alabama at Birmingham. Gunther-Canada specializes in the role of women in politics.

Gunther-Canada's major books include Rebel Writer: Mary Wollstonecraft and Enlightenment Politics (Northern Illinois University Press, 2001) and Women, Politics, and American Society (Longman, 2002, 2005).

She has been awarded the Marian D. Irish Award, the Frederick W. Conner Prize in the History of Ideas, and the Presidential Award for Excellence in Teaching.

She is also the former president of the Women's Caucus for Political Science: South.
