= Carl E. Misch =

American prosthodontist

- Born: November 17, 1947
- Died: January 4, 2017 (aged 69)
- Education: University of Detroit Dental School (D.D.S. 1973); University of Pittsburgh School of Dental Medicine (M.S. 1989)
- Occupations: Implantologist, inventor, entrepreneur
- Known for: Co-founder of BioHorizons implant company and founder of the Misch Institute
- Spouse: Single
- Children: 6

Carl E. Misch (November 17, 1947 – January 4, 2017) was an American prosthodontist recognized internationally for his clinical and academic contributions to the field of implant dentistry.

== Biography ==
Misch graduated magna cum laude in 1973 from the University of Detroit Dental School. He received his prosthodontic certificate, implantology certificate and Master's degree from the University of Pittsburgh School of Dental Medicine. The University of Yeditepe in Istanbul, Turkey and Carol Davila University of Medicine and Pharmacy in Bucharest, Romania each awarded Dr. Misch a Ph.D. (honoris causa). He holds several other post-graduate honors including twelve fellowships in dentistry, including the American College of Dentists, International College of Dentists, Royal Society of Medicine, American Association of Hospital Dentistry and the International Academy of Dentistry.

== Career ==
Misch was Clinical Professor in the Department of Periodontology and Oral Implantology, and Director of Oral Implantology (hon) in the School of Dentistry, Temple University Philadelphia, PA, USA. Misch served on the board of trustees at the University of Detroit Mercy where he was also an adjunct professor in the Department of Prosthodontics. He was adjunct professor at the University of Michigan, School of Dentistry in the Department of Periodontics/Geriatrics and adjunct professor at the School of Engineering in the Department of Biomechanics, at the University of Alabama at Birmingham. He was the Director of the Oral Implantology Residency Program at the University of Pittsburgh School of Dental Medicine from 1989 to 1996. Misch had maintained a private practice restricted to implant surgery (bone grafting and implant placement) and related prosthetics for more than 30 years. He previously practiced in Beverly Hills, Michigan.

In 1999, he authored the text, Contemporary Implant Dentistry, and Misch has written three editions of Contemporary Implant Dentistry (Elsevier), which has become a very popular textbook that has been translated into 9 languages, including, Japanese, Spanish, Portuguese, Turkish, Italian and Korean. He has also written Dental Implant Prosthetics (Elsevier). He had published over 250 articles and has repeatedly lectured in every state in the United States as well as in 47 countries throughout the world.

In 1984, Misch founded the "Misch International Implant Institute" (MIII) in Beverly Hills, Michigan, which served as a one-year continuum for implant education. The MIII currently has locations in Florida and Nevada. Over the years, the MIII has been present in Brazil, Canada, France Italy, Japan, Korea, Monaco, Spain, and the United Kingdom. This program has (or is currently) the primary implant education forum for six dental school specialty residencies. Programs are offered in both the surgical and prosthetic aspects of care. Misch held 16 patents and was the co-inventor of the BioHorizons Maestro Implant System. He operated the Misch International Implant Institute, as a training center for dentists seeking to improve their skills in these techniques. To date, it has trained over 4,500 dentists.

Through a special affiliation arrangement with the institute, second year postgraduate periodontology students at Maurice H. Kornberg School of Dentistry at Temple University attend and participate on a tuition-free basis in six three-day advanced surgical oral implantology courses given at the Misch Institute. In tandem, Misch had been appointed as Clinical Professor and Director of Oral Implantology in the Department of Periodontology at the dental school. Jon Suzuki, past director of the periodontal program at Temple Dental School, and Thomas Rams, chairman of the same program, are both on surgical faculty at the institute.
