= Carol Garrison =

American academic administrator

Carol Z. Garrison was the 6th President of the University of Alabama at Birmingham. The Board of Trustees of the University of Alabama System unanimously voted to appoint her to the office on July 23, 2002. She stepped down from presidency on August 16, 2012.

She is a member of Phi Beta Kappa, Sigma Xi, and Delta Omega. She was twice honored as the Carolina Distinguished Professor.

== Prior employment ==
- 1976-1978 – Assistant Professor of Nursing, University of Alabama at Birmingham
- 1978-1982 – Assistant Professor, University of North Carolina at Chapel Hill
- 1982-1992 – Faculty Member, University of South Carolina
- 1992-1994 – Professor & Chair of Epidemiology and Biostatistics, University of South Carolina
- 1994-1997 – Associate Provost & Dean of the Graduate School, University of South Carolina
- 1997-2002 – Provost, University of Louisville
- 2002-2002 – Acting president, University of Louisville

== Education ==
- 1974 – Bachelor's Degree, University of North Carolina at Chapel Hill
- 1976 – Master's Degree, UAB School of Nursing
- 1978 – Pediatric Nurse Practitioner Certificate, UAB School of Nursing
- 1982 – Ph.D. in Epidemiology, University of North Carolina at Chapel Hill
