= University of Alabama System =

Public university system in Alabama

The University of Alabama System
- Seal of the Board of Trustees of The University of Alabama
- Type: Public university system
- Established: 1969
- Endowment: $2.09 billion (2023)
- Chancellor: Sid Trant
- Faculty: 4,940
- Students: 70,000+
- Location: Alabama, United States
- Campus: Birmingham; Huntsville; Tuscaloosa
- Website: www.uasystem.edu

University of Alabama System locations

The University of Alabama System is a public university system in Alabama that coordinates and oversees three research universities: University of Alabama (UA), University of Alabama at Birmingham (UAB), and University of Alabama in Huntsville (UAH). These universities enroll more than 70,000 students. The system employs more than 45,000 employees at its three campuses and health system making it one of the largest employers in the state.

== Campuses ==
The University of Alabama was founded in 1831 in Tuscaloosa and is the state of Alabama's oldest public university. In 1936, UA established an extension center in Birmingham, and the University of Alabama School of Medicine moved there in the same year. In 1950, another extension center was set up in Huntsville.

In 1966, the Birmingham extension center and the School of Medicine merged as the University of Alabama in Birmingham. However, it was still treated as an offsite department of the main campus in Tuscaloosa. With the creation of the UA system in 1969, UAB became a fully autonomous institution, and the Huntsville extension center also became an autonomous four-year campus as the University of Alabama in Huntsville. The Birmingham and Huntsville campuses were now headed by presidents, as was the main campus in Tuscaloosa, with all three presidents reporting on an equal basis to the UA system chancellor.

Campus	Abbreviation	Founded	Enrollment	Athletics nickname	Athletics conference	Athletics level
University of Alabama Tuscaloosa	UA	1831	38,563	Crimson Tide	Southeastern Conference (SEC) (Note: Currently an NCAA Division I athletic conference.)	NCAA Division I FBS
University of Alabama at Birmingham	UAB	1969	22,080	Blazers	American Athletic Conference (AAC)	NCAA Division I FBS
University of Alabama in Huntsville	UAH	1969**	9,100	Chargers	Gulf South Conference (GSC) (Note: Currently an NCAA Division II athletic conference.)	NCAA Division II

=== The University of Alabama ===
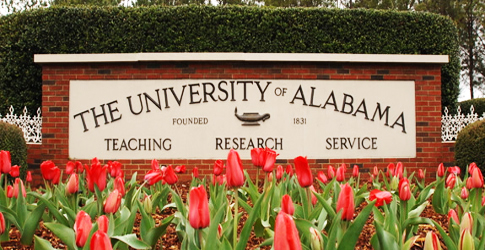
The University of Alabama

Founded in 1831 and located in Tuscaloosa, Alabama, The University of Alabama (also known as Alabama, or colloquially as 'Bama) was established by constitutional provision under statutory mandates and authorizations. Its mission is to advance the intellectual and social condition of the people of the state through quality programs of teaching, research and service. Within Alabama, it is often called the Capstone and UA. Outside the state, it is well known for its athletic teams being nicknamed the "Crimson Tide" (crimson is the primary color of the state flag of Alabama and one of the school colors).

=== University of Alabama at Birmingham ===
The University of Alabama at Birmingham (UAB) is a public research university covering 83 blocks in Alabama's largest city Birmingham. The university is classified among "R1: Doctoral Universities – Very high research activity". UAB is a vital economic engine of the state of Alabama with an estimated $7.15 billion annual impact. UAB is currently the state's largest employer with more than 24,000 faculty and staff and over 64,000 jobs at the university and in the health system. Almost 10% of the jobs in the Birmingham-Hoover Metropolitan Area are related to UAB.

=== University of Alabama in Huntsville ===
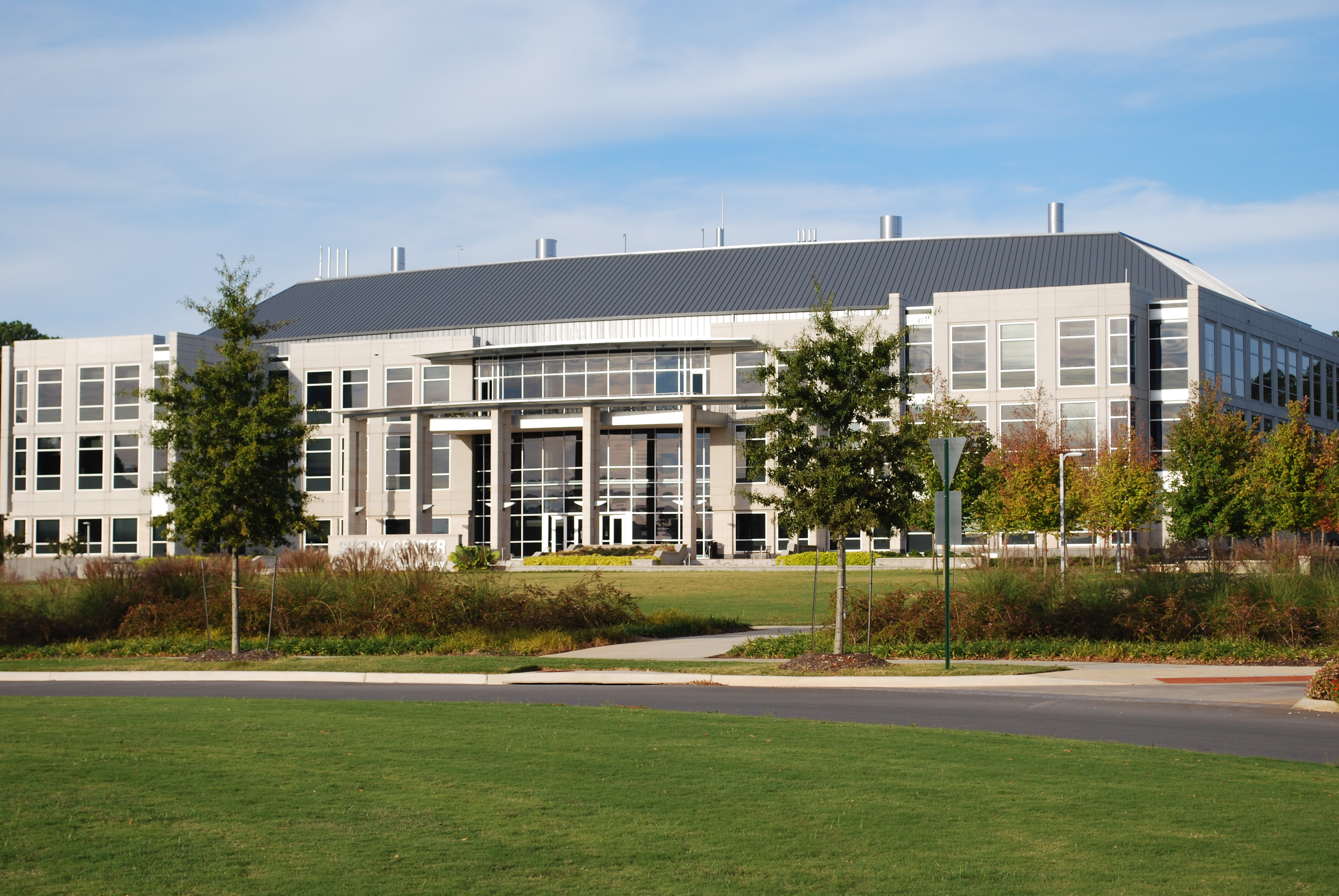
Shelby Center for Science and Technology at UAH

The University of Alabama in Huntsville (also known as UAH) is located in Huntsville, Alabama and it was founded in 1950. UAH is accredited by the Southern Association of Colleges and Schools to award bachelor's degrees, master's degrees, and doctorates. This university is organized into five colleges: business, engineering, the liberal arts, nursing, and the sciences.

UAH is known for its programs in engineering and the physical sciences, such as geophysics (the Earth's magnetosphere) and the physics of interplanetary space. UAH is a Space Grant university, and it has a history of cooperation with both the National Aeronautics and Space Administration (See: Marshall Space Flight Center) and the U.S. Army Aviation and Missile Command. The National Space Science and Technology Center is on the campus of UAH.

== Governance ==
The Board of Trustees executes its governance responsibilities through a chancellor, who serves as the chief executive officer of the System. A president heads each campus with responsibility for campus administration and reports directly to the Chancellor and through the Chancellor to the Board of Trustees. The Board of Trustees and the Chancellor delegate certain administrative functions and maintain such offices as deemed appropriate to meet the administrative needs of the System. The Chancellor also provides linkage between the System and various components of state and federal governments, as well as other educational groups and organizations.

=== Board of trustees ===
The Board of Trustees of the University of Alabama is a self-nominating board composed of 15 elected members and one ex officio member. The makeup of the board is dictated by the Constitution of the State of Alabama which requires that the board be made up of three members from the congressional district that contains the Tuscaloosa campus and two members from every other congressional district in Alabama. The Governor of Alabama is a member of the board by virtue of the office. Elected board members are nominated by the board and are confirmed by the Alabama State Senate. Board members may serve three consecutive six-year terms.
