= University of Alabama at Birmingham =

Public university in Birmingham, Alabama, US

The University of Alabama at Birmingham
- Former names: Medical College of Alabama (1859–1966); Birmingham Extension Center (1936–1966); College of General Studies (1966); The University of Alabama in Birmingham (1966–1969)
- Type: Public research university
- Established: June 16, 1969; 57 years ago
- Parent institution: University of Alabama System
- Accreditation: SACS
- Academic affiliations: AAU; GCU; ORAU; USU; Sea-grant; Space-grant
- Endowment: $1 billion
- Budget: $4.34 billion (2021)
- President: Ray L. Watts
- Provost: Janet Woodruff-Borden
- Faculty: 3,278
- Total staff: 24,024
- Students: 20,905
- Undergraduates: 11,959
- Postgraduates: 8,946
- Location: Birmingham, Alabama, United States; 33.5020°N 86.8079°W
- Campus: 636 acres (2.57 km^{2}); Midsize city
- Newspaper: The Kaleidoscope
- Colors: Green, gold, and white
- Nickname: Blazers
- Sporting affiliations: NCAA Division I FBS – The American; MEAC; SoCon; CUSA
- Mascot: Blaze the Dragon
- Website: www.uab.edu

The University of Alabama at Birmingham (UAB) is a public research university in Birmingham, Alabama, United States. Founded in 1969 and part of the University of Alabama System, UAB has grown to be the state's largest employer, with more than 27,302 faculty and staff and over 53,000 jobs at the university. The university is classified among "R1: Doctoral Universities – Very high research activity".

UAB offers 140 programs of study in 12 academic divisions leading to bachelor's, master's, doctoral, and professional degrees. In the fall of 2024, UAB enrolled 20,905 students from more than 110 countries. The UAB Health System, one of the largest academic medical centers in the United States, is affiliated with UAB. UAB is a member of the Association of American Universities.

The UAB athletic teams known as the Blazers compete in 18 varsity-level sports in the NCAA Division I - American Conference. Its official varsity colors are green and gold. The Blazers have won 11 conference championships to date.

== History ==
In 1936, in response to the rapid growth of the Birmingham metropolitan area and the need for university education, the University of Alabama established the Birmingham Extension Center. The center operated in an old house in downtown Birmingham at 2131 6th Avenue North and enrolled 116 students. In 1945, UA's newly established four-year School of Medicine moved from Tuscaloosa to Birmingham and took over management of Jefferson and Hillman hospitals. In 1957 enrollment at the extension center stood at 1,856. By 1959, research grants, training grants, and fellowships exceeded $1 million, and ground was broken for a new Children's Hospital.

By the 1960s, the extension center was developing into a university in its own right. An engineering building was built close to the medical center in 1962. In September 1966, the Extension Center was renamed the College of General Studies and elevated to a full four-year program. That November, the College of General Studies and the School of Medicine were merged into the University of Alabama in Birmingham, with Dr. Joseph Volker as "Vice President for Birmingham Affairs"–reflecting that it was still treated as an offsite department of the main campus in Tuscaloosa. An Advisory Board for UAB was created in 1967. In 1969, the legislature created the University of Alabama System. UAB became one of three four-year institutions within the new system, which also included UA and the University of Alabama in Huntsville (UAH) in Huntsville. Volker became UAB's first president.

== Campus ==
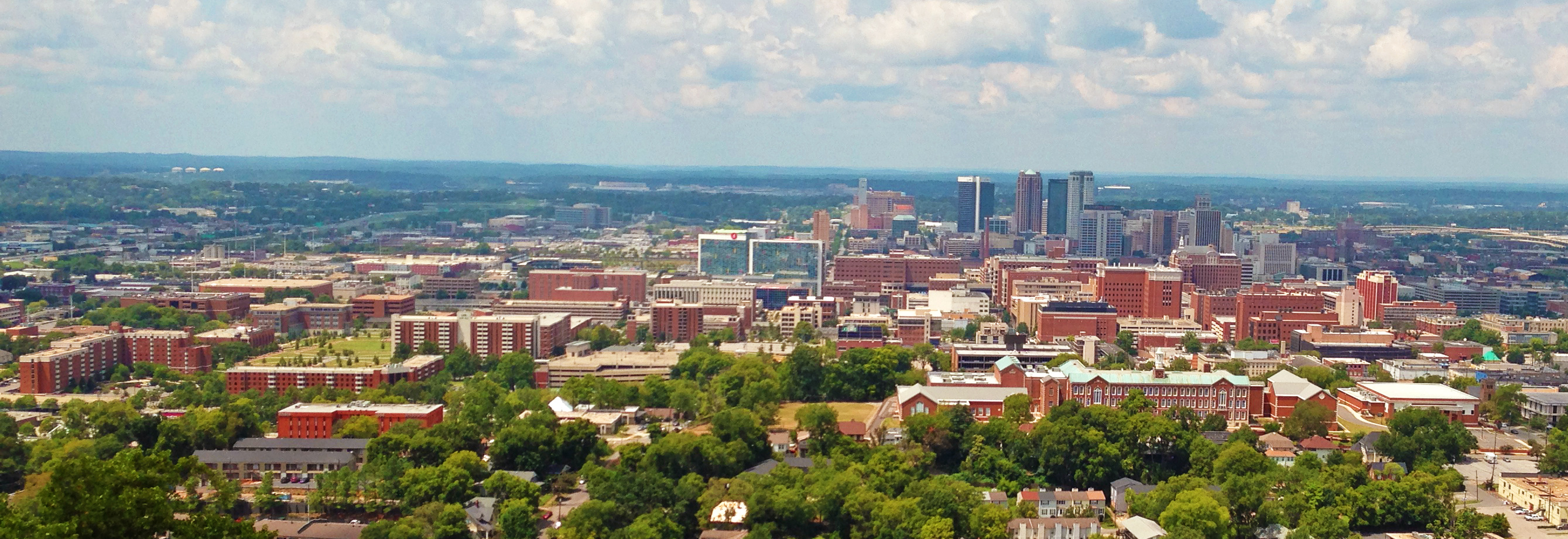
UAB campus and downtown Birmingham

UAB is located in the Southside neighborhood of downtown Birmingham, Alabama, occupying more than 100 city blocks and surrounded by three historic neighborhoods: Five Points South, Glen Iris, and the Southside. There is a blend of public and private property inside the university limits. I-65, 10th, 11th, and 12th Avenues South, 22nd Street South, and 2nd Avenue South are the boundaries of UAB campus. The campus has more than 216 academic, residential, and recreational facilities spread across around 636 acres (257 hectares), or roughly 16 million square feet (1.5 million square meters) of building area.

The UAB strategic plan's pillars are supported by the campus master plan, which places an emphasis on innovative facilities and improved growth management. The campus master plan also includes the creation of eight activity zones: Academics, Athletics & Recreation, Cultural, Hospital/Highlands, Residential, Research, Southern Research, and Support, with some overlapping zone areas of collaboration such as Academic, Research, and Hospital. Honors Hall, the Collat School of Business, the School of Nursing, University Hall, Gold Hall, McMahon Hall, McCallum Basic Health Science Building, Early Learning Center, and the Technology Innovation Center are amongst the recently completed building construction projects on the university. The Science and Engineering Complex's second phase project, the Altec/Styslinger Genomic Medicine & Data Sciences Building, the Marnix E. Heersink Institute for Biomedical Innovation Conference Center, Biomedical Research and Psychology Building, Unity Park, Department of Art and Art History, Cooper Green Mercy Health, University Emergency Department, Rehabilitation Pavilion, 14th Street Parking Deck, and the Southern Research Biotechnology Building are among the ongoing constructions in the university. Since 2013, about 1.1 million gross square feet (100,000 m^{2}) of new facilities have been added to UAB's footprint through the completion or ongoing development of 17 major university construction projects.

=== UAB Campus Green ===
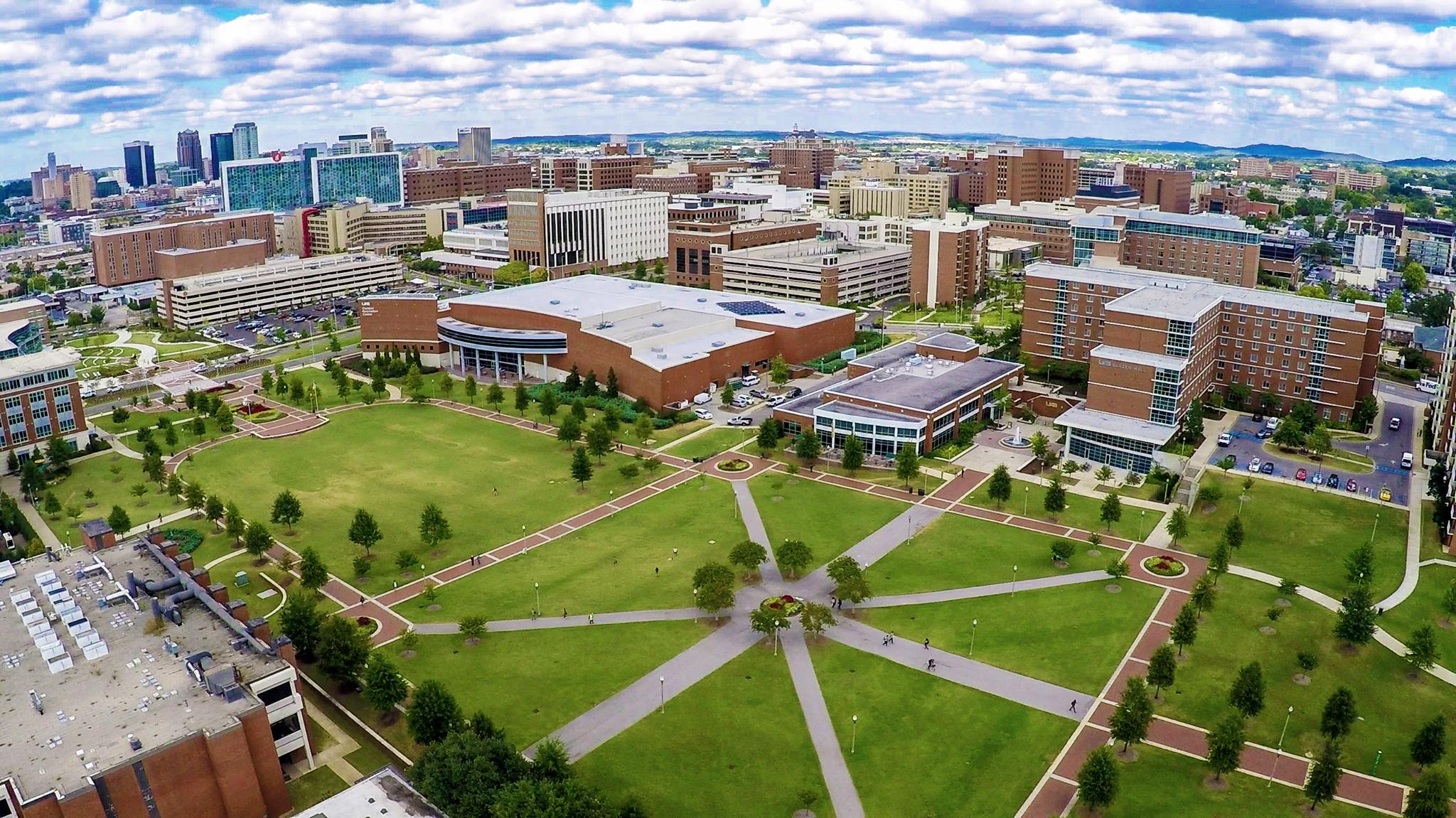
UAB Campus Green in Birmingham, Alabama

UAB's Campus Green, also referred to as "the Green", is an open green area and a quadrangle intended for usage by members of the university community and visitors. It was built in 2008 and considered to be the focal point of the campus. The university's long-term master plan, which describes Campus Green as "the signature open space and the center of the academic core," includes the quadrangle as a key element. The Green is surrounded by green grasses, plants, shrubs, trees and walkways, that include 10th Avenue South, University Boulevard, the Chemistry Building, University Dining Facility, Camp Hall, Blazer Hall, Heritage Hall, University Hall (UAB College of Arts & Sciences) and the Campus Recreation Center. The Green is a part of a centuries-old higher education tradition that offers a serene outdoor space for introspective thought and communal gathering.

=== Student facilities ===
To support its transition from a historically commuter-focused campus to a residential institution, the university expanded its student-centered infrastructure along the University Boulevard and Campus Green corridors. These facilities include:

- Hill Student Center: Opened in 2015 to replace the 1983 Hill University Center, this 162,000-square-foot facility serves as the central administrative and social hub for the student body. The building houses student organization offices, the Undergraduate Student Government Association (USGA), multi-purpose meeting spaces, a 250-seat theater, the university bookstore, and campus dining options.
- Campus Recreation Center: Opened in 2005, this 152,000-square-foot, three-story facility is located on the northeast side of the Campus Green. It features a two-story fitness floor, four basketball/volleyball courts, an aquatics center with a lap pool, a five-story climbing wall, and four fitness studios.
- Student Activity Building: Opened in September 2024 at the corner of 14th Street South and 11th Avenue South, this 12,790-square-foot facility provides dedicated meeting and event space for registered student organizations, fraternities, and sororities. The single-story building features a large divisible assembly room with a capacity of 280, four smaller individual assembly rooms, a catering kitchen, and dedicated workspace for student leadership.

=== UAB Arts ===
The Alys Stephens Center is home to the performing arts of the city of Birmingham and is the residence venue for events by the Alabama Symphony Orchestra, UAB's theater and music departments and other globally recognized performers. The Alys Stephens Center is the hub of UAB's Cultural Arts Corridor, located on the cultural zone of the campus, which houses the cutting-edge Abroms-Engel Institute for Visual Arts (AEIVA) that brings the arts into the community through its ArtPlay and Arts in Medicine programs.

== Organization and administration ==
UAB is governed by the Board of Trustees of the University of Alabama System. The board is self-nominating and composed of 15 elected members and two ex officio members. Board members are confirmed by the Alabama State Senate.

The president of the University of Alabama at Birmingham and is appointed by the chancellor. The president also chairs the board of the UAB Health System. Richard Marchase was named interim president on August 21, 2012, after the retirement of Carol Garrison. In February 2013, Ray L. Watts became UAB's seventh president.

=== College and schools ===
School of Dentistry logo

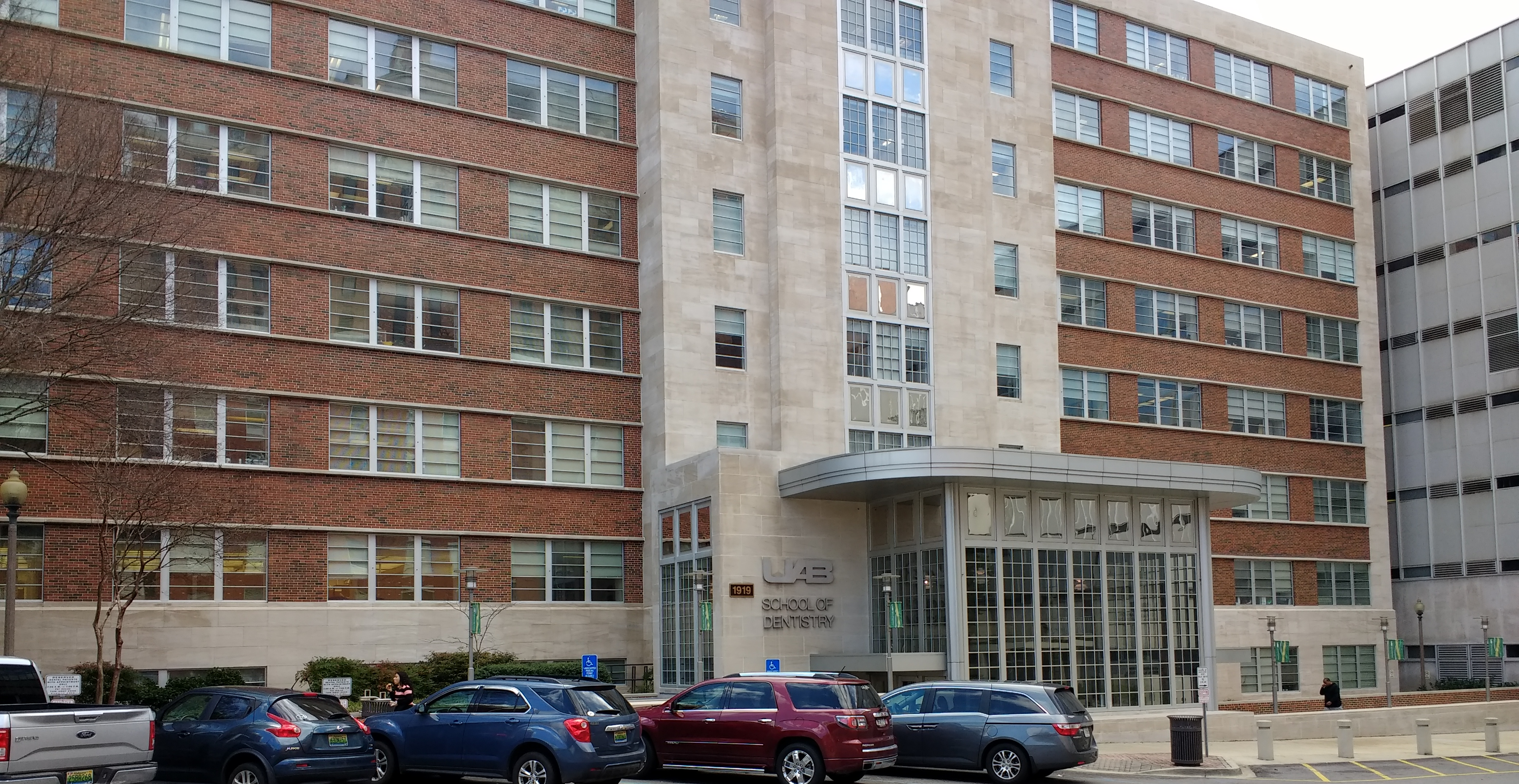
School of Dentistry building

UAB is composed of one college, nine schools, an honors college and a graduate school. These academic divisions offer 57 bachelor's degree programs, 69 master's degree programs, 3 specialist's, 42 doctoral programs, and 3 professional degrees.

Colleges and schools are:

- College of Arts and Sciences (2010)
- Collat School of Business (1971)
- School of Dentistry (UAB; 1948): founded as the only dental school in Alabama. The School of Dentistry admitted its first class of students in October 1948. The development of "four-handed dentistry" and the expanded utilization of trained auxiliary personnel were pioneered at this institution. From 2012 through 2015 the School was ranked first in research funding from the National Institute of Dental and Craniofacial Research.
- School of Education and Human Sciences (1971)
- School of Engineering (1971)
- Graduate School (1969)
- School of Health Professions (1969)
- Heersink School of Medicine (1944): the School of Medicine moved to Birmingham in 1948 from the university campus in Tuscaloosa and became a four-year school.
- Honors College (2011)
- School of Nursing (1950)
- School of Optometry (1969)
- School of Public Health (1981)

=== Endowment ===
UAB's endowment reached more than 1 billion dollars after a 2018 campaign goal. It includes more than 103,000 donors, which is the largest fundraising campaign effort in UAB history.

=== Research Expenditures ===
UAB received more than $715 million in research grants and extramural awards for FY 2022.

== Academics ==
UAB is a large, four-year research university and is classified among "R1: Doctoral Universities – Very high research activity". UAB has been accredited by the Southern Association of Colleges and Schools since 1970, according to the U.S. Department of Education. UAB offers degrees in the undergraduate, graduate, and doctoral levels from the schools in Business, Education, Engineering, Graduate School, Health Professions, Nursing, Public Health, and the College of Arts and Sciences. It also houses the Honors College and the three professional schools that offer professional degrees in dentistry, Medicine, and Optometry. UAB has inaugurated some new programs in bioinformatics, cancer biology genetics and genomic sciences, digital forensic immunology and neuro-engineering that are the first of its kind in the US.

=== UAB Medicine ===
With almost 2 million clinical visits and care provided every year, UAB is considered one of the largest academic medical centers that offers patient care to the state of Alabama and the surrounding areas. The institution is also training future medical professionals and advancing medical science through study and research at health-related professional schools of UAB; Dentistry, Health Professions, Nursing, Optometry, Public Health and the Heersink School of Medicine. A number of managed hospitals are part of the UAB Health System, including the UAB Hospital, the Valley Foundation, the University of Alabama Health Services Foundation, the UAB Callahan Eye Hospital Authority, the Medical West Hospital Authority, the L.V. Stabler Hospital, J. Paul Jones Hospital, Brian Whitfield Memorial Hospital, Cooper Green Mercy Health Services Authority, and other local hospitals. Ascension St. Vincent's and UAB Health System have formed a collaborative partnership to expand access to healthcare through numerous locations and wellness initiatives. Diabetes, mental and behavioral health, and health disparities are addressed by this partnership. Additionally, it maintains close relationships with other public and private nonprofit organizations that are housed on and around the UAB campus, such as the Children's of Alabama and the Veterans Affairs Medical Center. The UAB Health System, a distinct not-for-profit organization, oversees, coordinates, and manages the medical facilities connected to UAB.

With 1,207 beds, the flagship UAB Hospital is the largest in Alabama and the eighth largest in the nation. It is home to the only Level 1 adult trauma center in the state and the only hospital in Alabama to consistently rank among U.S. News & World Report's "America's Best Hospitals". The O'Neal Comprehensive Cancer Center is the only center in Alabama and the surrounding four states to get an NCI designation, and it leads the country in advancing cancer research, care, and education.

Providing a peer-reviewed proof of concept for xenotransplantation and paving the way for a steady, sustainable supply of life-saving organs, UAB successfully tested the first human preclinical model for transplanting genetically modified pig kidneys into humans in January 2022.

Academic rankings

National
- Forbes: 307
- U.S. News & World Report: 136 (tie)
- Washington Monthly: 196
- WSJ/College Pulse: 256

Global
- ARWU: 301-400
- THE: 169
- U.S. News & World Report: 170 (tie)

=== Rankings ===
In the 2022 U.S. News & World Report rankings, UAB was tied for the 137th best national university and was ranked tied for the 64th best public university.

UAB graduate programs was ranked in the 2024 U.S. News & World Report "Best Graduate Schools" including Healthcare Management (1st), Nursing; Masters (10th) and Doctoral (11th), Nursing-Anesthesia (29th), Medical School in Primary Care (24th) and in Research (35th), Physician Assistant (8th), Public Health (18th), Biostatistics (31st), Occupational Therapy (37th) and Physical Therapy (21st). Other programs are also ranked including Part-time MBA (98th), Education (117th), Engineering (112th), Biological Sciences (74th), Chemistry (136th), Clinical Psychology (70th), Computer Science (132nd), Mathematics (117th), Physics (152nd), Psychology (97th), Social Work (60th), and Sociology (84th).

In 2018–19, Times Higher Education ranked UAB 1st "Young University" in the US and 12th around the world for two consecutive years among institutions that are 50 years old or younger. Also, UAB ranked 160th worldwide, around top 8% among global universities according to 2023 U.S. News & World Report Best Global Universities ranking.

=== Student profile ===
In fall semester of 2018, the UAB student body consisted of 13,836 undergraduates, 6,933 graduate students and 1,154 professional doctoral students from all 67 Alabama counties, all 50 states and more than 110 foreign countries. The undergraduate student body was 56% non-Hispanic white, 26% Black/African-American, 6% Asian, 5% two or more races, 3% Hispanic, and 3% International.

=== Faculty and staff ===
UAB has more than 3,000 faculty. Eight faculty members from UAB have been elected to the National Institute of Medicine. The student-faculty ratio at UAB is 18:1.

=== Libraries ===
UAB Libraries has two main libraries, both located on its main Birmingham campus:

- Mervyn H. Sterne Library: From its beginning as a small extension division library when UAB was formed in 1969, the Sterne Library emerged and has developed into a major academic library. From 1969 until 1973, the Library was housed in several locations. It opened for service in January 1973 at its present location, and since that time, the Library has undergone several renovations and expansions. Its collections support teaching and research in the arts and humanities, business, education, engineering, natural sciences, mathematics, and social sciences. In addition to more than 1 million print and electronic books and subscriptions to over 41,000 periodicals, the library also provides users with access to specialized databases, audio-visual materials, microforms, and other electronic resources.
- Lister Hill Library of the Health Sciences (LHL): Established in 1945, LHL is the largest biomedical library in Alabama and serves as a Resource Library for the Southeast/Atlantic Region in the National Network of Libraries of Medicine. The collections of the library span seven centuries of knowledge with medieval manuscripts and some thirteen thousand rare books, bound journals and books in the various health science disciplines, archival records and photographs, and electronic access to thousands of online journals and books.

They also operate a number of branch/satellite, remote, and virtual locations/collections:

- Lister Hill Library at University Hospital (LHL@UH): This branch location of the Lister Hill Library of the Health Sciences is housed within the Graduate Medical Education (GME) Wellness Center in University Hospital, and the physical space is only open to UAB Residents and Fellows. Library services, however, are available to all hospital staff. The mission of LHL@UH is to provide the staff of University Hospital with accurate, reliable, and timely information in support of patient care, education, and research.
- Reynolds-Finley Historical Library: Lawrence Reynolds (1889–1961), a native of Ozark, Alabama, formed this library's original collection. Motivated by his roots in Alabama, Reynolds donated his valuable collection of about 5,000 volumes on February 2, 1958, and the Reynolds Historical Library officially opened. On November 14, 2014, it was announced that a gift from Sara J. Finley and Randall W. Finley that honors their father, Wayne H. Finley, would form an endowment for the continued enhancement and expansion of the medical historical collections. In recognition of this significant gift, and of Finley's longstanding commitment to medical history at this university, the Reynolds Historical Library was renamed the Reynolds-Finley Historical Library.
- Alabama Museum of the Health Sciences: The Alabama Museum of the Health Sciences supports UAB and broader communities through the stewardship of health sciences objects and histories, with an emphasis on Alabama, and through educational opportunities, engaging exhibitions, and thoughtful collecting. The scope of the collection includes, but is not limited to, the following fields: medicine, nursing, ophthalmology, dentistry, public health. and allied health.
- Sparks Medical Library: Located on the UAB Huntsville Regional Medical Campus, in-house book collections of the most current core clinical textbooks and shelf/board review guides are available in all clinical specialties offered on the Huntsville Campus.
- 801 Building: The 801 Building is a remote storage facility where less-frequently requested items in the collection are kept. These items are still available to library users and can be requested through the courier service. A sampling of items stored here include journals from the Sterne Library dating from 1999 and back, microfilm, microfiche, cassettes, albums, kits, and print books.
- UAB Archives: The official repository for the University of Alabama at Birmingham seeks to advance knowledge concerning the origins, mission, and programs of UAB. The Archives also seeks to encourage efficient records management, which ensures UAB records of enduring historical value will be identified for inclusion in the Archives. The Archives collects and preserves a wide variety of materials, including original institutional records, manuscripts, letters, memos, photographs, scrapbooks, ledgers, audio/visuals, and university publications, ephemera, objects, and realia.
- UAB Digital Collections: Featured collections include American Civil War Collection, Birmingham Medical College Collection, Dennis G. Pappas Otolaryngology Collection, Ethnographic Film Collection, Florence Nightingale Collection, Historical Collections of the UAB Libraries, Incunabula Collection, Lawrence Reynolds WWI Photograph Collection, Marcel Proust Collection, Medical Instrument Catalog Collection, Mervyn Hayden Sterne Collection, Medieval and Renaissance Manuscript Collection, Middle Eastern Medical Collection, Rare Alabama Medical Journal Collection, StoryCorps, Department of History: Oral History Office Collection, Transactions of the Southern Surgical Association Collection, William C. Carter Collection, and William Osler Letter Collection.
- UAB Digital Commons: UAB Digital Commons is an open access repository service of the University of Alabama at Birmingham Libraries. Items included represent research and scholarly output submitted by members of the UAB campus community.

== Research and economic impact ==
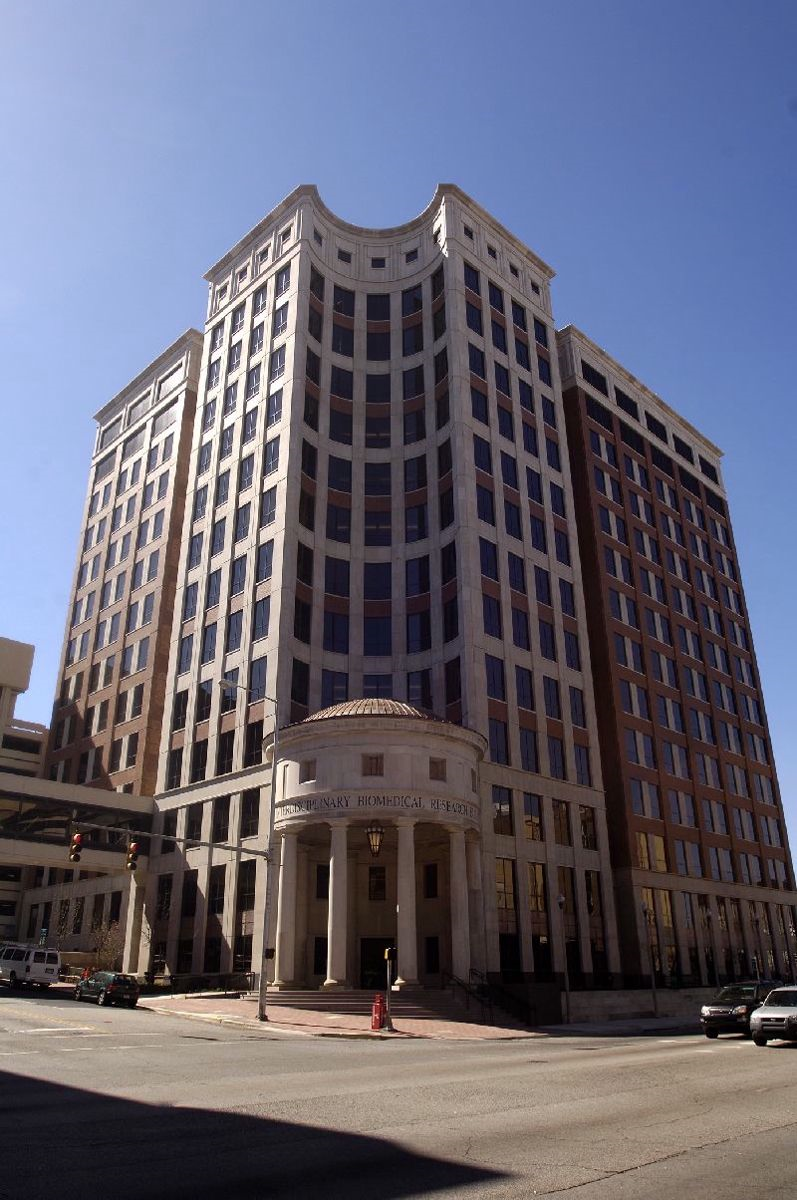
Shelby Biomedical Research Building in University Boulevard, Birmingham, Alabama

In 2023, UAB invested $780 million in research expenditures. Funding has increased by $351 million, or 82%, over the previous ten years. In terms of all federal research expenditures, UAB is ranked 21st among public institutions and first in the state. It also ranks in the top four percent of public universities and the top one percent of all organizations for NIH funding in FY23. In addition, UAB's six health-related schools including the Heersink School of Medicine rank among the top 20 public universities in terms of NIH funding for FY 2023. Additionally, UAB obtained unprecedented funding from organizations including the Department of Defense, the Centers for Disease Control and Prevention, and the Department of Energy, as well as for clinical trials funded by the industry. It is creating novel treatments for the most debilitating diseases that affect humans, such as diabetes, cancer, and Alzheimer's disease; developing new materials for everything from stronger military equipment to bio-coatings for cardiac stents; fighting cybercrime committed worldwide via computers in a unique cyber forensics center in partnership with the FBI, Homeland Security, and corporate partners like Facebook and Google; and making important strides in climatology, marine biology, and medicine in remote areas of Antarctica.

The O'Neal Comprehensive Cancer Center, which is established in 1971, is the only NCI-Designated Comprehensive Cancer Center in the state of Alabama and the surrounding area to receive this designation from the National Cancer Institute, and one of only 56 such centers nationwide. For 48 years, the center has been continuously funded, enabling it to conduct state-of-the-art cancer research and provide patient care in the four-state area.

The Engineering and Innovative Technology Development division has been the major developer and supplier of cryo-equipment for the International Space Station since 1990. It has also supported the development of specialized research instruments for land and microgravity-based research experiments.

The Bill L. Harbert Institute for Innovation and Entrepreneurship (HIIE), established in 2014, housed at the Collat School of Business aims to promote economic growth, facilitate the commercialization of research, and assist in the formation of businesses. The institution has employed a multifaceted approach to foster innovation in the living sciences, with a special focus on biotechnology, and has assisted in the creation of startups.

=== Economic impact ===
In 2022, UAB contributed $12.1 billion to Alabama's economy, up 41% from $7.15 billion in 2016. More than $371 million in state and local taxes were produced by UAB, which also maintained or supported 107,600 employments in Alabama. More than $115.4 million in community impact is produced by UAB academics, staff, and students through donations and volunteer work to nearby NGOs. Furthermore, the UAB Health System provides charitable care worth about $363.1 million to underprivileged communities in Birmingham and around the state.

== Student life ==
Undergraduate demographics as of Fall 2023
| Race and ethnicity | Total |
|---|---|
| White | 48% |
| Black | 27% |
| Asian | 9% |
| Hispanic | 8% |
| Two or more races | 5% |
| International student | 2% |
| Unknown | 1% |
Economic diversity
| Low-income (Note: The percentage of students who received an income-based federal Pell grant intended for low-income students.) | 34% |
| Affluent (Note: The percentage of students who are a part of the American middle class at the bare minimum.) | 66% |

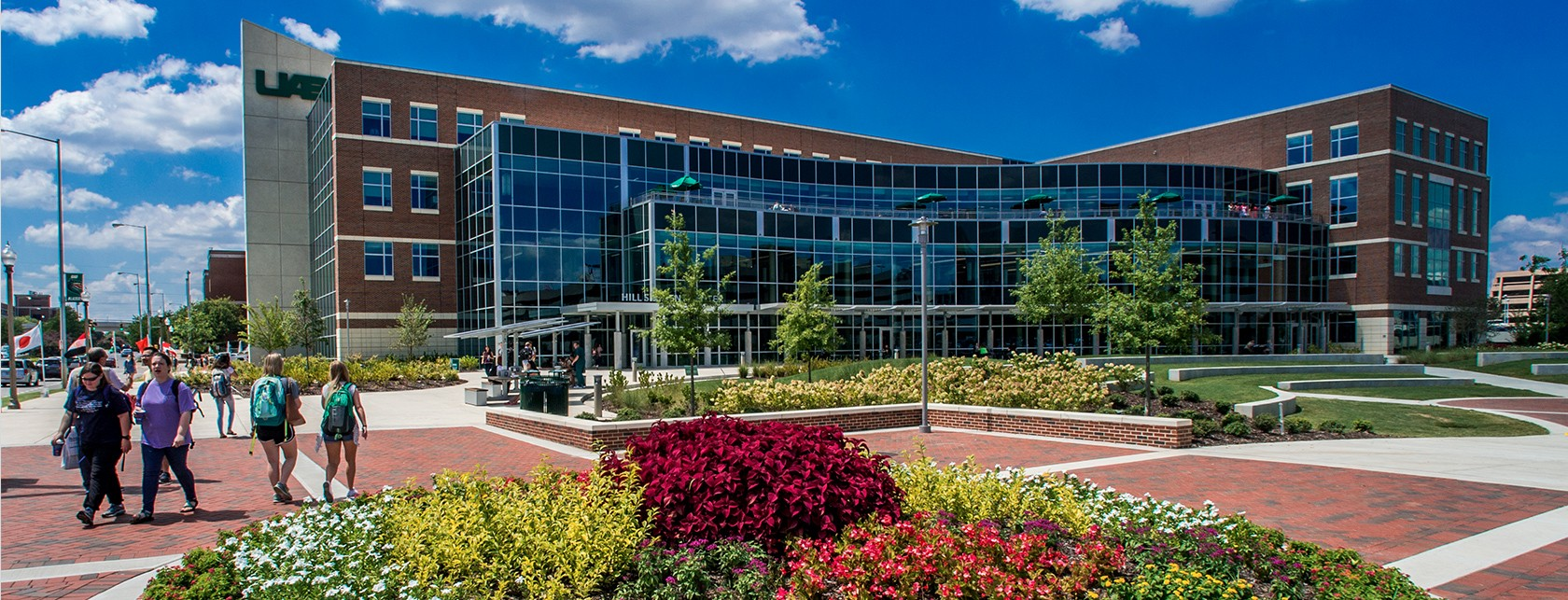
UAB Hill Student Center

There are over 450 student organizations on the UAB campus. About six percent of undergraduate men and eight percent of undergraduate women are active in UAB's Greek system. UAB's students also run media outlets, including a weekly newspaper, a radio station, and a semi-annual magazine. The school also has an intramural program.

=== Student housing and residential life ===
Beginning with the Fall 2017 entering class, UAB implemented a residency requirement for many first-time freshmen. The policy was expanded in 2019 to require nearly all first-year students outside the Birmingham metropolitan area to live in university housing. According to UAB's 2024–25 Common Data Set, approximately 80% of first-time, first-year students lived in university-owned or affiliated housing. Since 2000, UAB has demolished several older residence halls to support campus development efforts, including Blazer Hall, University Hall and the Garden Apartments in 2002, Hixson Hall in 2007, and Denman Hall in 2025.

On-campus student housing is concentrated around the Campus Green corridor and consists of six primary residence halls:

Freshman Halls:

- Blazer Hall
- Gold Hall
- McMahon Hall

Upperclassman Halls:

- Blount Hall
- Camp Hall
- Rast Hall

To accommodate upperclassmen and graduate students living off-campus, a substantial student residential footprint has developed in the adjacent Parkside District surrounding Railroad Park and Regions Field. This multi-block area features several privately owned, student-oriented apartment complexes that are officially integrated into the university's off-campus housing database.

=== Greek System ===
UAB hosts 36 international fraternities and sororities across four governing councils with over 1,000 active students. Within the undergraduate student body, a total of 8% of women join a sorority and 6% of men join a fraternity. UAB's fraternity and sorority community is noted for maintaining an average cumulative GPA that consistently exceeds the general all-student undergraduate average.

The four governing councils of UAB's Greek system are the Interfraternity Council (IFC), the College Panhellenic Council (CPH), the National Pan-Hellenic Council (NPHC), and the Multicultural Greek Council (MGC). The first organizations to be chartered or installed within each respective governing council on the UAB campus were Pi Kappa Phi (for IFC), Alpha Gamma Delta (for CPH), Omega Psi Phi (for NPHC), and Sigma Sigma Rho (for MGC).

=== UAB Bands ===
UAB Bands consists of multiple ensembles including the Marching Blazers, Wind Symphony, Blazer Band, Symphony Band, Percussion, Summer Community Band, and Birmingham Youth Wind Symphony. Students and the UAB community have the opportunity to participate and join the UAB Bands and to perform in local, national, and international stage. UAB's fraternity and sorority community is noted for maintaining an average cumulative GPA that consistently exceeds the general all-student undergraduate average.

==== Marching Blazers ====
The 135-member UAB Marching Blazers made their debut at a home football game on September 17, 1994.The Marching Blazers went to Ireland in 2013 to participate in the St. Patrick's Day parade in Dublin and won the title of "Best International Band" competing in the Limerick International Band Competition. They also went to Hawaii to perform at USS Missouri in Pearl Harbor in March 2015.

With more than 200 members, the Marching Blazers add to UAB campus life by performing at football games, pep rallies, and numerous other campus-wide events. The group is usually requested to perform as the exhibition band at state and regional marching band competitions.

=== Media ===
The Kaleidoscope is the official student-run newspaper of the University of Alabama at Birmingham (UAB) that published breaking news to quizzes on campus. It produced weekly printed newspaper but transitioned to digital and online news outlet starting in fall 2020. The Kaleidoscope was first issued in 1967, two years before the university become autonomous from Tuscaloosa campus.

=== Fall Traditions ===
UAB maintains several campus-wide traditions organized by Student Affairs, student committees, and the UAB National Alumni Society. Originally celebrated during the winter basketball season starting in 1979, the university transitioned its central traditions to the fall semester in October 1994 to align with the establishment of its football program.

- Gurney Derby: Established in 1994, the Gurney Derby is an annual race held during Homecoming week along 10th Avenue South. Reflecting UAB's origins as an academic medical center, student-led teams of four (two men and two women) race over a short course while pushing a standard hospital gurney carrying a designated non-living "passenger". Teams compete in timed heats and are evaluated on speed, gurney design, and passenger creativity, with a distinct "Dead Last Award" given to the final finisher.
- Mr. and Ms. UAB: Initiated during the 1979 men's basketball season, this university-wide competition selects two student representatives to serve as institutional ambassadors for the academic year. Sponsored by the UAB National Alumni Society, candidates are evaluated on academic performance, leadership, and civic engagement, with selected winners and alternates receiving dedicated tuition scholarships.
- Blazer Build-It and Homecoming Parade: The institutional Homecoming week includes the Blazer Build-It competition, where student organizations and academic departments construct large, thematic display boards evaluated by a campus panel for design and thematic integration. The week includes the annual Homecoming Parade, featuring the UAB Marching Blazers, student groups, and university floats traveling down 14th Street South and University Boulevard.

=== Spring Traditions ===
In addition to autumn homecoming events, UAB maintains several campus-wide traditions during the spring semester. Coordinated by student government divisions, university councils, and multicultural student organizations, these annual events focus primarily on community service, philanthropy, and commemorative scholarship fundraising.

- Into the Streets is a biannual signature service event organized by the University of Alabama at Birmingham (UAB) Leadership and Service Council. The initiative connects UAB students, faculty, and administrators with local community partners to spearhead localized civic engagement, environmental stewardship, and community improvement projects across the Greater Birmingham area.
- Camille Armstrong Memorial Scholarship Stepshow: Coordinated by the Black Student Awareness Committee, this annual event is one of the longest-running National Pan-Hellenic Council (NPHC) step competitions in Alabama. The show serves as the primary fundraiser for an endowed scholarship honoring Camille Yvette Armstrong, a UAB student ambassador and political science major who died in a motor vehicle accident in 1986 shortly before graduation. Event proceeds support the Camille Armstrong Memorial Scholarship, established in memory of Armstrong and historically associated with undergraduate students pursuing careers in law.

== Athletics ==
UAB's athletic teams are known as the Blazers. The school athletic colors are green and gold. The Blazers currently participates in NCAA Division I, as a member of the American Conference, including 7 men's sports teams and 11 women's sports teams.

The school started its intercollegiate athletic program in 1978. The program was inaugurated with men's basketball by Gene Bartow. Bartow served as the school's head basketball coach and athletic director for 18 years. Bartow led UAB to the NCAA Tournament seven times. Bartow retired from coaching in 1996. The following year, UAB renamed its basketball venue from UAB Arena to Bartow Arena in his honor.

In December 2014, the university announced that the programs for football, bowling and rifle were being eliminated at the end of the 2014–2015 academic year, citing soaring operating costs. This decision was later reversed and the programs were reinstated.

On July 1, 2023, UAB officially joined as a member of the American Conference. The mayor of Birmingham declared July 1 as UAB Day to celebrate and commemorate UAB's entry to the American Conference league.

=== Men's basketball ===
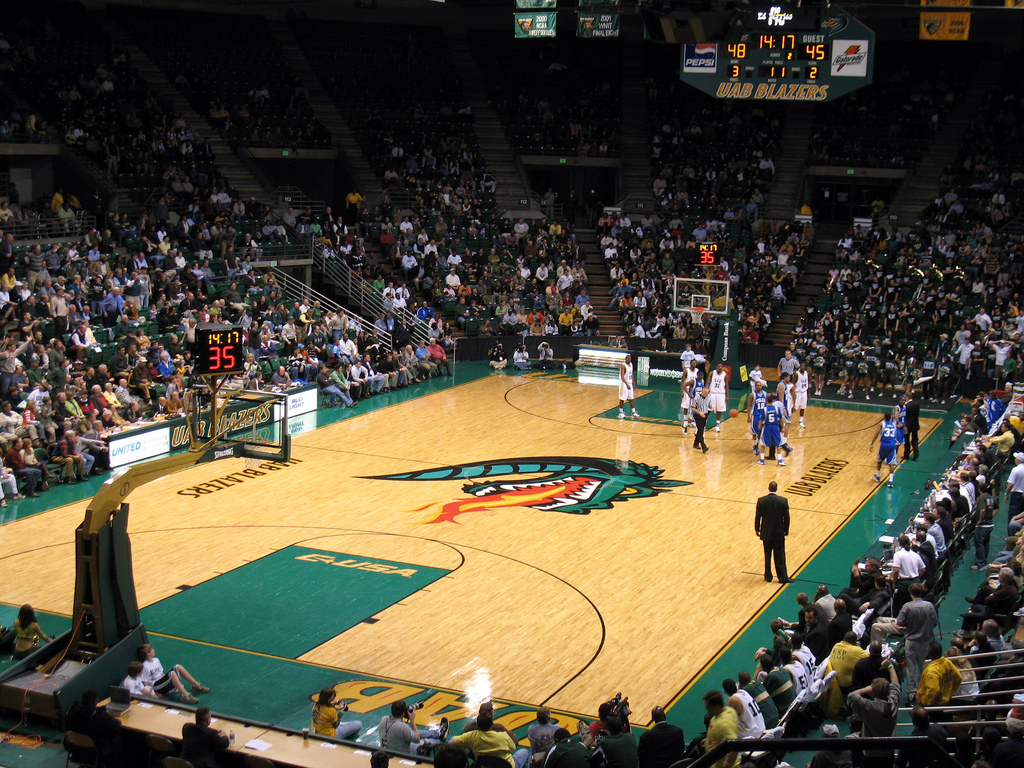
UAB Blazers Men's Basketball vs. Tulsa at Bartow Arena

UAB Blazers men's basketball was introduced in 1978, marking the beginning of their athletics program. UAB was able to entice Gene Bartow to leave his position as UCLA's head coach in order to launch the Blazers program. The Blazers have made 17 appearances in the NCAA Division I men's basketball tournament and have reached the Elite Eight, and the Sweet Sixteen 3 times.

Blazers men's basketball have won multiple conference title including their first year as a member of the American Conference, the 2024 American Conference men's basketball tournament Champions. The Blazers play home games at Bartow Arena.

=== Football ===
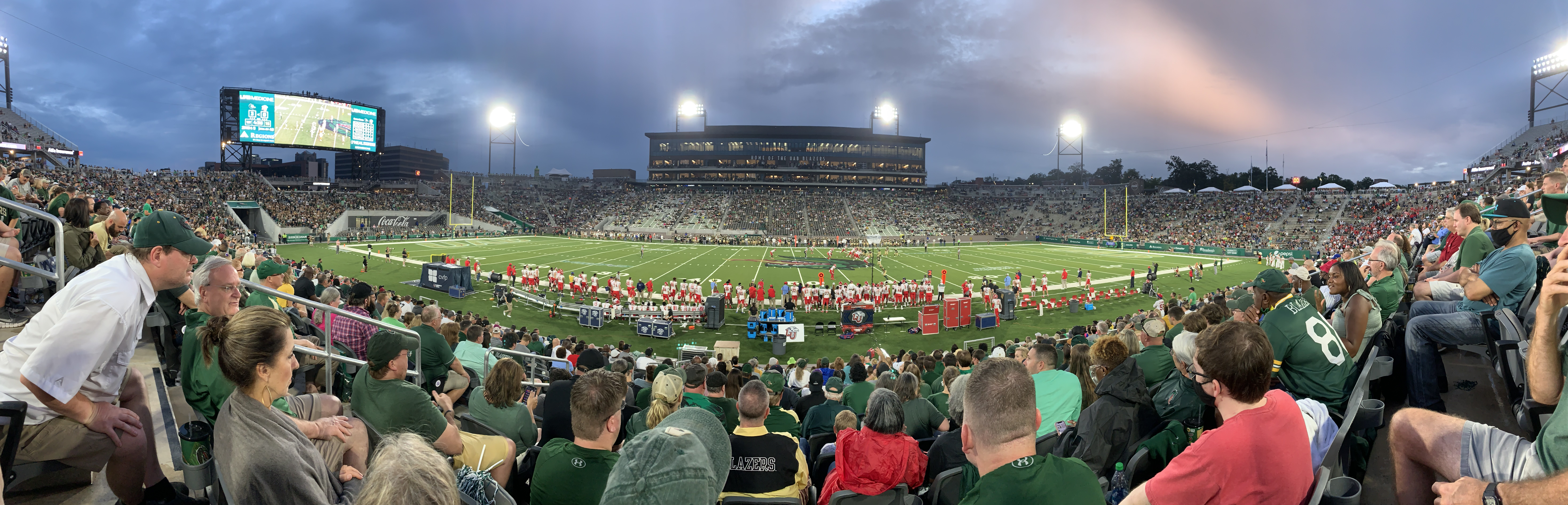
Inaugural game at the new home stadium Protective Stadium of the UAB Blazers football - UAB VS.Liberty

UAB Blazers football team's first game was in 1991 in the Division III, headed by Jim Hilyer, the first head coach of the Blazers football team. The UAB football program was terminated after the 2014 season due to budget cuts, but was reinstated and returned in 2017. The Blazers have won 2 conference titles and 3 bowl games including the recent 2022 Bahamas Bowl, defeating Miami of Ohio. A new stadium, Protective Stadium, has been the home of the Blazers starting from the 2021 season.
