= 2017 Georgia State Panthers beach volleyball team =

Beach volleyball season

2017 Georgia State Panthers beach volleyball
- Conference: Coastal Collegiate Sports Association
- Record: 21-14 (6–5 CCSA)
- Head coach: Beth Van Fleet
- Home arena: GSU Beach Volleyball Complex

The 2017 Georgia State Panthers beach volleyball team represented Georgia State University during the college beach volleyball season of 2017. The team's head coach was Beth Van Fleet in her fourth season at GSU. The Panthers played their home games at the GSU Beach Volleyball Complex and competed in the Division I Coastal Collegiate Sports Association. The 2016 season was the second as an official NCAA sport, and the first that the Panthers played in the CCSA, finishing in second place. The Panthers were ranked in the official top 10 during the entire season, earning a spot as the 7th seed in the NCAA Tournament.

== 2017 roster ==
#	Name	Height	Year	Hometown
1	Haley Pa'akaula	5 ft 11 in (1.80 m)	Graduate	Honolulu, HI
2	Chelsea Ross	5 ft 10 in (1.78 m)	Graduate	Murfreesboro, TN
3	Georgia Johnson	5 ft 11 in (1.80 m)	Freshman	Brisbane, Australia
4	Ashley McGinn	5 ft 9 in (1.75 m)	Sophomore	Sewell, NJ
5	Chloe Cook	5 ft 10 in (1.78 m)	Junior	Marietta, GA
10	Maddie Gordon	6 ft 0 in (1.83 m)	Freshman	Fort Worth, TX
11	Kate Novack	5 ft 9 in (1.75 m)	Freshman	Fort Wayne, IN
13	Sarah Agnew	5 ft 8 in (1.73 m)	Senior	Coppell, TX
14	Jessie Swaney	5 ft 7 in (1.70 m)	Junior	McDonough, GA
15	Delaney Rohan	5 ft 10 in (1.78 m)	Senior	Brooklyn Park, MN
20	Jessica Fourspring	5 ft 11 in (1.80 m)	Senior	Greer, SC
21	Olivia Stasevich	5 ft 8 in (1.73 m)	Freshman	Canton, GA
22	LeeAnn Starr	5 ft 9 in (1.75 m)	Freshman	Cincinnati, OH|
23	Natalie Wilson	5 ft 10 in (1.78 m)	Senior	Plymouth, MN
24	Allie Elson	5 ft 6 in (1.68 m)	Junior	Woodstock, GA
25	Amie Held	5 ft 9 in (1.75 m)	Graduate	Festus, MO

== Schedule ==
2017 Georgia State Panthers sand volleyball game log

Date	Opponent	GSU rank	Location	Time	Result	Record
March 4	**UNC Wilmington**	8	St. Augustine, FL	10:30 AM	W 4-1	1-0 (1-0)
March 4	**Charleston**	8	St. Augustine, FL	1:30 PM	W 5-0	2-0 (2-0)
March 5	North Florida	8	St. Augustine, FL	9:30 AM	W 5-0	3-0 (2-0)
March 5	Spring Hill	8	St. Augustine, FL	12:30 PM	W 5-0	4-0 (2-0)
March 7	Austin Peay	7	GSU Beach Volleyball Complex	9:00 AM	W 5-0	5-0 (2-0)
March 7	Mercer	7	GSU Beach Volleyball Complex	5:00 PM	W 3-2	6-0 (2-0)
March 11	Cal Poly	7	Manhattan Beach, CA	2:30 PM	L 4-1	1-6 (2-0)
March 11	#6 Long Beach State	7	Manhattan Beach, CA	5:30 PM	L 0-5	6-2 (2-0)
March 12	#4 UCLA	7	Manhattan Beach, CA	2:00 PM	L 0-5	6-3 (2-0)
March 12	#3 Pepperdine	7	Manhattan Beach, CA	7:00 PM	L 1-4	6-4 (2-0)
March 17	Jacksonville State	8	Deland, FL	9:00 AM	W 5-0	7-4 (2-0)
March 17	New Mexico	8	Deland, FL	12:00 PM	W 3-2	8-4 (2-0)
March 17	Morehead State	8	Deland, FL	2:00 PM	W 5-0	9-4 (2-0)
March 18	Stetson	8	Deland, FL	10:00 AM	W 3-2	10-4 (2-0)
March 18	**Florida Atlantic**	8	Deland, FL	1:00 PM	L 2-3	10-5 (2-1)
March 25	Stetson	9	Columbia, SC	1:00 PM	3-2	10-6 (2-1)
March 25	**Florida State**	9	Columbia, SC	9:00 AM	3-2	10-7 (2-2)
March 26	USC	9	Columbia, SC	3:00 PM	5-0	10-8 (2-2)
March 26	**South Carolina**	9	Columbia, SC	11:00 AM	3-2	11-8 (3-2)
April 1	**LSU**	10	GSU Beach Volleyball Complex	12:30 PM	3-2	11-9 (3-3)
April 1	Lincoln Memorial	10	GSU Beach Volleyball Complex	6:30 PM	5-0	12-9 (3-3)
April 2	**UAB**	10	GSU Beach Volleyball Complex	2:00 PM	4-1	13-9 (4-3)
April 2	Jacksonville State	10	GSU Beach Volleyball Complex	6:00 PM	5-0	14-9 (4-3)
April 7	TCU	10	Tallahassee, FL	8:30 AM	3-2	14-10 (4-3)
April 7	**Florida Atlantic**	10	Tallahassee, FL	11:30 AM	3-2	15-10 (5-3)
April 8	**South Carolina**	10	Tallahassee, FL	8:30 PM	4-1	15-11 (5-4)
April 8	**Florida International**	10	Tallahassee, FL	2:30 PM	3-2	16-11 (6-4)
April 14	ULM	10	Baton Rouge, LA	3:00 PM	3-2	17-11 (6-4)
April 14	Spring Hill	10	Baton Rouge, LA	6:00 PM	4-1	18-11 (6-4)
April 15	TAMU Kingsville	10	Baton Rouge, LA	10:00 AM	5-0	19-11 (6-4)
April 15	**LSU**	10	Baton Rouge, LA	3:00 PM	3-2	19-12 (6-5)
April 21	(7) Charleston (CCSA Championship Group State)	(9) #3 Seed	Emerson, GA	10:30 AM	5-0	20-11 (1-0)
April 21	(6) Florida Atlantic (CCSA Championship Group Stage)	(9) #3 Seed	Emerson, GA	3:00 PM	2-3	20-12 (1-1)
April 22	(2) LSU (CCSA Championship Group Stage)	(9) #3 Seed	Emerson, GA	12:00 PM	2-3	20-13 (1-2)
April 22	(10) UAB (CCSA Championship Group Stage)	(9) #3 Seed	Emerson, GA	3:00 PM	21-13	21-13 (2-2)

- Conference Games in bold
