= 2016 Georgia State Panthers beach volleyball team =

2016 Georgia State Panthers beach volleyball
- Conference: Coastal Collegiate Sports Association
- Record: 25-7 (6–4 CCSA)
- Head coach: Beth Van Fleet
- Home arena: GSU Sand Volleyball Complex

The 2016 Georgia State Panthers beach volleyball team represented Georgia State University during the college beach volleyball season of 2016. The team's head coach was Beth Van Fleet in her third season at GSU. The Panthers played their home games at the GSU Beach Volleyball Complex and competed in the Division I Coastal Collegiate Sports Association. The 2015 season was the first as an official NCAA sport, the designation being coordinated with a name change from sand volleyball to beach volleyball. The season was also the Panthers first in the CCSA, finishing in second place. The Panthers were ranked in the official top 10 during the entire season, earning a spot as the 7th seed in the NCAA Tournament.

== 2015 Roster ==
#	Name	Height	Year	Hometown
1	Jessie Swaney	5 ft 7in	Sophomore	McDonough, GA
2	Nina Interwies	5 ft 6in	Redshirt Junior	Gammelby, Germany
3	Janson Button	5 ft 7in	Senior	Menifee, CA
4	Ashley McGinn	5 ft 9in	Freshman	Sewell, NJ
5	Chloe Cook	5 ft 10in	Sophomore	Marietta, GA
10	Alexis Townsend	5 ft 7in	Senior	Houston, TX
11	Milani Pickering	5 ft 8in	Senior	Mesa, AZ
12	Brooke Weiner	5 ft 12in	Freshman	Ventura, CA
13	Sarah Agnew	5 ft 8in	Junior	Coppell, TX
14	Katelyn Rawls	5 ft 11in	Senior	Wellington, FL
15	Delaney Rohan	5 ft 10in	Junior	Brooklyn Park, MN
20	Jessica Fourspring	5 ft 11in	Junior	Greer, SC
21	Alexis Elmurr	5 ft 6in	Senior	Lewis Center, OH
22	Sara Olivova	5 ft 11in	Senior	Franklin, MN|
23	Natalie Wilson	5 ft 10in	Junior	Plymouth, MN
24	Allie Elson	5 ft 6in	Sophomore	Woodstock, GA

== Schedule ==
2016 Georgia State Panthers Sand Volleyball Game Log

Date	Opponent	GSU Rank	Opponent Rank	Location	Time	Result	Record
March 5	North Florida	8	–	Boca Raton, Florida	9:00 PM	W 4-1	1-0 (0–0)
March 5	Webber	8	–	Boca Raton, Florida	11:00 AM	W 5-1	2-0 (0–0)
March 5	Florida Atlantic*	8	–	Boca Raton, Florida	3:00 PM	L 2–3	2-1 (0–1)
March 9	Mercer	10	–	GSU Beach Volleyball Complex	5:00 PM	W 5-0	3-1 (0–1)
March 12	Stetson	10	–	Baton Rouge, LA	2:00 PM	W 3-2	4-1 (0–1)
March 12	Florida International*	10	9	Baton Rouge, LA	4:00 PM	W 4-1	5-1 (1–1)
March 12	New Orleans	10	–	Baton Rouge, LA	6:00 PM	W 5-0	6-1 (1–1)
March 13	ULM	10	–	Baton Rouge, LA	11:00 AM	W 5-0	7-1 (1–1)
March 13	LSU*	10	–	Baton Rouge, LA	1:00 PM	W 3-2	8-1 (2–1)
March 21	Pepperdine	8	1	Charleston, SC	11:00 AM	L 1–4	8-2 (2–1)
March 21	Lincoln Memorial	8	–	Charleston, SC	1:30 PM	W 5-0	9-2 (2–1)
March 22	UNC Wilmington	8	–	Charleston, SC	3:00 PM	W 5-0	10-2 (2–1)
March 25	Eckerd	8	–	GSU Beach Volleyball Complex	1:00 PM	W 5-0	11-2 (2–1)
March 25	Lincoln Memorial	8	–	GSU Beach Volleyball Complex	5:00 PM	W 4-1	12-2 (2–1)
March 26	UNC Wilmington	8	–	GSU Beach Volleyball Complex	1:00 PM	W 5-0	13-2 (2–1)
March 26	ULM	8	–	GSU Beach Volleyball Complex	5:00 PM	W 5-0	14-2 (2–1)
March 29	Mercer	8	–	Macon, GA	4:00 PM	W 4-1	15-2 (2–1)
April 1	South Carolina*	8	–	Ft. Lauderdale, FL	9:00 AM	W 5-0	16-2 (3–1)
April 1	USC	8	2	Ft. Lauderdale, FL	12:00 PM	L 1–4	16-3 (3–1)
April 2	Florida Atlantic*	8	–	Ft. Lauderdale, FL	12:00 PM	W 4-1	17-3 (4–1)
April 2	Florida International*	8	10	Ft. Lauderdale, FL	4:00 PM	L 2–3	17-4 (4–2)
April 8	Houston Baptist	9	–	New Orleans, LA	10:20 PM	W 5-0	18-4 (4–2)
April 8	Arizona	9	7	New Orleans, LA	3:45 PM	L 2–3	18-5 (4–2)
April 9	Tulane*	9	–	New Orleans, LA	11:40 AM	L 2–3	18-6 (4–3)
April 9	LSU*	9	–	New Orleans	2:20 PM	W 4-1	19-6 (5–3)
April 15	College of Charleston	9	–	Tallahassee, FL	3:30 PM	W 5-0	20-6 (5–3)
April 15	Florida State*	9	3	Tallahassee, FL	6:30 PM	L 2–3	20-7 (5–4)
April 16	North Florida	9	–	Tallahassee, FL	1:00 PM	W 2–3	21-7 (5–4)
April 16	UAB*	9	–	Tallahassee, FL	4:00 PM	W 4-1	22-7 (5–4)
April 22	Florida International (CCSA Championship)	9	10	Ft. Lauderdale, FL	9:30 AM	W 3-2	23-7 (1-0 Tournament)
April 22	Florida Atlantic (CCSA Championship)	9	–	Ft. Lauderdale, FL	2:30 PM	W 3-2	24-7 (2-0 Tournament)
April 23	Tulane (CCSA Championship)	9	–	Ft. Lauderdale, FL	9:00 AM	W 5-0	25-7 (3-0 Tournament)
April 24	LSU (CCSA Championship Semifinal)	9	–	Ft. Lauderdale, FL	9:30 AM	W 3-2	26-7 (4-0 Tournament)
April 24	Florida State (CCSA Championship Final)	9	3	Ft. Lauderdale, FL	1:00 PM	L 0–3	26-8 (4-1 Tournament)
May 6	USC Trojans (NCAA First Round)	7	2	Gulf Shores, AL	12:00 PM	L 0–3	26-9 (0–1 Tournament)
May 6	Arizona (NCAA First Round Elimination Bracket)	7	6	Gulf Shores, AL	3:00 PM	L 2–3	26-10 (0–2 Tournament)

- Conference Games
