= 2018 Georgia State Panthers beach volleyball team =

2018 Georgia State Panthers beach volleyball
- Conference: Coastal Collegiate Sports Association
- Record: 22-10 (7–7 CCSA)
- Head coach: Beth Van Fleet
- Home arena: GSU Beach Volleyball Complex

The 2018 Georgia State Panthers beach volleyball team represented Georgia State University during the college beach volleyball season of 2018. The team's head coach was Beth Van Fleet in her fifth season at GSU. The Panthers played their home games at the GSU Beach Volleyball Complex and compete in the Division I Coastal Collegiate Sports Association. The 2017 season was the third as an official NCAA sport, and the second that the Panthers played in the CCSA. The Panthers finished with a 24–12 record, ranked 11th in the official NCAA sanctioned AVCA coaches poll.

== 2018 roster ==
#	Name	Height	Year	Hometown
1	Ashley Bauchert	5 ft 9 in (1.75 m)	Freshman	Allen, TX
2	Rebekah Brodbeck	5 ft 9 in (1.75 m)	Freshman	San Antonio, TX
3	Georgia Johnson	5 ft 11 in (1.80 m)	Sophomore	Brisbane, Australia
4	Ashley McGinn	5 ft 9 in (1.75 m)	Junior	Sewell, NJ
10	Maddie Gordon	6 ft 0 in (1.83 m)	Sophomore	Fort Worth, TX
11	Kate Novack	5 ft 9 in (1.75 m)	Sophomore	Fort Wayne, IN
12	Brooke Weiner	5 ft 11 in (1.80 m)	Junior	Ventura, CA
13	Meagan McCall	5 ft 7 in (1.70 m)	Freshman	Phoenix, AZ
14	Jessie Swaney	5 ft 7 in (1.70 m)	Senior	McDonough, GA
15	Mattie Johnson	5 ft 7 in (1.70 m)	Freshman	Tabor City, NC
20	Teegan Van Gunst	6 ft 0 in (1.83 m)	Graduate	Fayetteville, GA
21	Olivia Stasevich	5 ft 8 in (1.73 m)	Sophomore	Canton, GA
22	Tiffany Creamer	6 ft 2 in (1.88 m)	Graduate	Newnan, GA|
23	Eden Hawes	5 ft 8 in (1.73 m)	Freshman	Panama City Beach, FL
24	Allie Elson	5 ft 6 in (1.68 m)	Senior	Woodstock, GA
25	Amie Held	5 ft 9 in (1.75 m)	Graduate	Festus, MO
30	Annika Van Gunst	6 ft 0 in (1.83 m)	Graduate	Fayetteville, GA

== Schedule ==
2018 Georgia State Panthers sand volleyball game log

Date	Opponent	GSU rank	Location	Result	Record
February 23	#8 **South Carolina**	12	Deland, FL	**L** 0-5	0-1 (0-1)
February 23	#15 Stetson	12	Deland, FL	**W** 3-2	1-1 (0-1)
February 24	Eckerd	12	Deland, FL	**W** 4-1	2-1 (0-1)
February 24	#4 **Florida State**	12	Deland, FL	**L** 1-4	2-2 (0-2)
February 24	**Florida Atlantic**	12	Deland, FL	Cancelled	-
March 3	#6 **LSU**	13	St. Augustine, FL	**W** 3-2	3-2 (1-2)
March 3	Texas A&M-Corpus Christi	13	St. Augustine, FL	**W** 5-0	4-2 (1-2)
March 4	**UNC Wilmington**	13	St. Augustine, FL	**W** 4-1	5-2 (2-2)
March 4	#9 **South Carolina**	13	St. Augustine, FL	L 3-2	5-3 (2-3)
March 6	Austin Peay	13	GSU Beach Volleyball Complex	**W** 5-0	6-3 (2-3)
March 6	Jacksonville State	13	GSU Beach Volleyball Complex	**W** 5-0	7-3 (2-3)
March 10	Florida Gulf Coast	11	Boca Raton	**W** 5-0	8-3 (2-3)
March 10	Houston Baptist	11	Boca Raton	**W** 3-2	9-3 (2-3)
March 10	#15 **Florida Atlantic**	11	Boca Raton	**W** 4-1	10-3 (3-3)
March 17	#7 **LSU**	11	Columbia, SC	**W** 3-2	11-3 (4-3)
March 17	#9 **South Carolina**	11	Columbia, SC	**L** 1-4	11-4 (4-4)
March 18	#1 Pepperdine	11	Columbia, SC	**L** 1-4	11-5 (4-4)
March 18	Jacksonville State	11	Columbia, SC	**W** 5-0	12-5 (4-4)
March 23	Jacksonville State	9	GSU Beach Volleyball Complex	**W** 5-0	13-5 (4-4)
March 23	North Florida	9	GSU Beach Volleyball Complex	**W** 5-0	14-5 (4-4)
March 24	ULM	9	GSU Beach Volleyball Complex	**W** 3-2	15-5 (4-4)
March 24	Mercer	9	GSU Beach Volleyball Complex	**W** 5-0	16-5 (4-4)
March 30	**Tulane Green Wave**	9	South Beach, FL	**W** 4-1	17-5 (5-4)
March 30	TCU	9	South Beach, FL	**W** 3-2	18-5 (5-4)
March 31	#11 Grand Canyon	9	South Beach, FL	**L** 2-3	18-6 (5-4)
March 31	#12 **FIU**	9	South Beach, FL	**L** 2-3	18-7 (5-5)
April 6	TCU	11	Tallahassee, FL	**L** 1-4	18-8 (5-5)
April 6	**UAB**	11	Tallahassee, FL	**W** 3-2	19-8 (6-5)
April 7	**UNC Wilmington**	11	Tallahassee, FL	**W** 5-0	20-8 (7-5)
April 7	**Florida State**	11	Tallahassee, FL	Cancelled	-
April 14	#7 **Florida State**	11	Baton Rouge, LA	**L** 0-5	20-9 (7-6)
April 14	#8 **LSU**	11	Baton Rouge, LA	**L** 1-4	20-10 (7-7)
April 15	New Orleans	11	Baton Rouge, LA	**W** 5-0	21-10 (7-7)
April 15	TCU	11	Baton Rouge, LA	**W** 3-2	22-10 (7-7)
April 20	**LSU**	11	Emerson, GA	**L** 2-3	22-11 (7-8)
April 20	**Florida State**	11	Emerson, GA	**W** 4-1	23-11 (8-8)
April 21	**Florida Atlantic**	11	Emerson, GA	**L** 0-5	23-12 (8-9)
April 21	**UNC-Wilmington**	11	Emerson, GA	**W** 5-0	24-12 (9-9)

- Conference Games in bold
