= 2015 Georgia State Panthers sand volleyball team =

2015 Georgia State Panthers sand volleyball
- Conference: Independent
- Record: 18-3
- Head coach: Beth Van Fleet
- Home arena: GSU Sand Volleyball Complex

The 2015 Georgia State sand volleyball team represented Georgia State University during the college sand volleyball season of 2015. The team's head coach was Beth Van Fleet in her second season at GSU. They played their home games at the GSU Sand Volleyball Complex and compete as Division I independents under the AVCA.

== 2015 roster ==
#	Name	Height	Year	Hometown
1	Jessie Swaney	5 ft 7in	Freshman	McDonough, GA
2	Nina Interwies	5 ft 7in	Junior	Gammelby, Germany
3	Janson Button	5 ft 6in	Junior	Menifee, CA
4	Karlee Kavanaugh	5 ft 10in	Junior	Chugiak, AK
5	Majda Dostalova	5 ft 11in	Freshman	Prague, Czech Republic
10	Alexis Townsend	5 ft 7in	Junior	Houston, TX
11	Milani Pickering	5 ft 8in	Junior	Mesa, AZ
12	Molly Smestad	5 ft 10in	Senior	Austin, TX
13	Sarah Agnew	5 ft 8in	Sophomore	Coppell, TX
14	Katelyn Rawls	5 ft 11in	Junior	Wellington, FL
15	Delaney Rohan	5 ft 10in	Sophomore	Brooklyn Park, MN
20	Jessica Fourspring	5 ft 11in	Sophomore	Blackstone, VA
21	Alexis Elmurr	5 ft 6in	Junior	Lewis Center, OH
22	Sara Olivova	5 ft 11in	Junior	Franklin, MN|
23	Natalie Wilson	5 ft 10in	Sophomore	Plymouth, MN
24	Alie Elson	5 ft 6in	Freshman	Woodstock, GA
25	Deidra Bohannon	5 ft 11in	Junior	Newnan, GA

== Schedule ==
2015 Georgia State Panthers sand volleyball game log

Date	Opponent	GSU rank	Opponent Rank	Location	Time	Result	Record
March 7	Mercer	10	-	Columbia, SC	12:30 PM	W 4-1	1-0
March 7	Jacksonville	10	-	Columbia, SC	4:30 PM	W 4-1	2-0
March 11	New Orleans	-	-	Atlanta, GA	9:00 AM	W 5-0	3-0
March 11	Mercer	-	-	Atlanta, GA	11:00 AM	W 5-0	4-0
March 11	South Carolina	-	-	Atlanta, GA	5:00 PM	W 5-0	5-0
March 14	Florida International	-	7	St. Augustine, FL	8:30 AM	L 2-3	5-1
March 14	LSU	-	-	St. Augustine, FL	12:30 PM	W 3-2	6-1
March 15	Florida Atlantic	-	-	St. Augustine, FL	8:30 AM	W 5-0	7-1
March 15	North Florida	-	-	St. Augustine, FL	10:30 AM	W 5-0	8-1
March 21	Arizona State	-	-	Columbia, SC	9:45 AM	W 4-1	9-1
March 21	Tulane	-	-	Columbia, SC	4:45 PM	W 3-2	10-1
March 22	Florida State	-	4	Columbia, SC	9:45 AM	W 3-2	11-1
March 22	Carson-Newman	-	-	Columbia, SC	4:45 PM	W 5-0	12-1
March 28	Mercer	7	-	Charleston, SC	8:00 AM	W 3-2	13-1
March 28	Tulane	7	-	Charleston, SC	12:30 PM	W 5-0	14-1
March 29	Stetson	7	-	Charleston, SC	11:00 AM	W 4-1	15-1
March 29	Jacksonville	7	-	Charleston, SC	2:00 PM	W 4-1	16-1
April 3	ULM	7	-	Atlanta, GA	11:00 AM	W 4-1	17-1
April 3	UAB	7	-	Atlanta, GA	3:00 PM	W 3-2	18-1
May 1	Pepperdine Waves	Seed 5	Seed 4	Gulf Shores, AL	10:00 AM	L 0-5	18-2
May 1	Stetson	Seed 5	Seed 8	Gulf Shores, AL	3:00 PM	L 2-3	18-3
