= 2014 Georgia State Panthers sand volleyball team =

2014 Georgia State Panthers sand volleyball
- Conference: Independent
- Record: 11-3
- Head coach: Beth Van Fleet
- Home arena: GSU Sand Volleyball Complex

The 2014 Georgia State sand volleyball team represented Georgia State University during the college sand volleyball season of 2014. The team's head coach was Beth Van Fleet in her first season at GSU. They played their home games at the GSU Sand Volleyball Complex and competed as Division I independents under the AVCA.

== Season Notes ==
- The Panthers were ranked between 8th and 10th in the country during the end of the season.

== 2014 roster ==
#	Name	Height	Year	Hometown
2	Moriah Bellissimo	5 ft 9in	Graduate	Blackstone, Va
3	Jansen Button	5 ft 7in	Sophomore	Menifee, Ca
4	Karlee Kavanaugh	5 ft 10in	Sophomore	Chugiak, Ak
5	Kaitlynn Hufstetler	5 ft 6in	Sophomore	Canton, Ga
10	Alexis Townsend	5 ft 7in	Sophomore	Houston, Tx
11	Milani Pickering	5 ft 8in	Sophomore	Mesa, Az
12	Molly Smestad	5 ft 10in	Senior	Austin, Tx
13	Sarah Agnew	5 ft 8in	Freshman	Coppell, Tx
14	Katelyn Rawls	5 ft 11in	Sophomore	Wellington, Fl
15	Delaney Rohan	5 ft 10in	Freshman	Brooklyn Park, Mn
20	Jessica Fourspring	5 ft 11in	Freshman	Blackstone, Va
21	Alexis Elmurr	5 ft 6in	Sophomore	Lewis Center, Oh
22	Sara Olivova	5 ft 11in	Sophomore	Franklin, Mn|
23	Natalie Wilson	5 ft 10in	Freshman	Plymouth, Mn
25	Katie Madewell	5 ft 11in	Senior	Kettering, Oh

== Schedule ==
2014 Georgia State Panthers sand volleyball game log

Date	Opponent	GSU rank	Opponent Rank	Location	Time	Result	Record
March 8	FAU	-	-	St. Augustine, FL	8:30 AM	W 5-0	1-0
March 8	Jacksonville	-	-	St. Augustine, FL	12:30 PM	W 3-2	2-0
March 9	FIU	-	9	St. Augustine, FL	8:30 AM	L 2-3	2-1
March 9	ULM	-	-	St. Augustine, FL	11:30 AM	W 3-2	3-1
March 11	FIU	-	9	GSU Sand Volleyball Complex	11:00 AM	W 3-2	4-1
March 11	South Carolina	-	-	GSU Sand Volleyball Complex	5:00 PM	W 5-0	5-1
March 11	Mercer	-	-	GSU Sand Volleyball Complex	8:00 PM	W 5-0	6-1
March 15	Jacksonville	-	-	Cocoa Beach, FL	8:00 AM	W 3-2	7-1
March 15	North Florida	-	-	Cocoa Beach, FL	11:00 AM	W 3-2	8-1
March 16	Stetson	-	-	Cocoa Beach, FL	8:00 AM	L 2-3	8-2
March 29	Pepperdine	9	1	GSU Sand Volleyball Complex	11:00 AM	L 4-1	8-3
March 29	College of Charleston	9	-	GSU Sand Volleyball Complex	11:00 AM	W 5-0	9-3
April 5	Mercer	8	-	Charleston, SC	2:00 PM	W 4-1	10-3
April 5	College of Charleston	8	-	Charleston, SC	4:00 PM	W 4-1	11-3
April 6	Florida State	8	4	Charleston, SC	8:00 AM	L 3-2	11-4
April 6	South Carolina	8	-	Charleston, SC	12:00 PM	W 4-1	12-4
April 11	Stetson	9	-	Siesta Key, FL	5:00 PM	W 3-2	13-4
April 26	UAB	10	-	Birmingham, AL	11:00 AM	L 2-3	13-5
April 26	Tulane	10	-	Birmingham, AL	1:00 PM	W 5-0	-14-5
