= 2022 NCAA Beach Volleyball Championship =

Intercollegiate beach volleyball tournament

- Logo
- Season: 2022 NCAA Beach Volleyball season
- Teams: 16
- Format: Mix of single- and double-elimination
- Finals site: Gulf Place Public Beach; Gulf Shores, Alabama
- Champions: USC Trojans (4th title)
- Runner-up: Florida State Seminoles
- Winning coach: Dain Blanton (2nd title)
- Attendance: 10,151 (last 3 days)
- Television: ESPN2, ESPN3 and ESPNU

The 2022 NCAA Beach Volleyball Championship (officially the 2022 National Collegiate Beach Volleyball Championship) was an intercollegiate tournament to determine the National Collegiate Athletic Association (NCAA) women's beach volleyball national champion for the 2021–22 season. The sixth edition of the tournament was held from May 4 to 8, 2022, at Gulf Place Public Beach in Gulf Shores, Alabama. The 2022 championship featured a 16-team field for the first time, doubled from previous years, as well as the addition of an opening knockout round before the traditional eight-team double-elimination bracket. Eight of the participating schools automatically qualified by winning their respective conference tournaments, while the other eight were given either a regional or an at-large bid by the NCAA Women's Beach Volleyball Committee. The tournament was broadcast on ESPN2, ESPN3 and ESPNU.

Defending champion USC Trojans were the pre-tournament favorites and entered as the top seed. They had a lineup that included the likes of 2020 Olympian Tina Graudina and then-reigning U19 world champions Megan Kraft and Delaynie Maple. The Trojans had a dominant run in the championship, dropping just one individual pairs match en route to the final. The biggest tournament upsets came from the tenth-seeded Georgia State Panthers, who beat the seventh-seeded Grand Canyon Antelopes and the second-seeded TCU Horned Frogs before being knocked out of the elimination bracket by the Loyola Marymount Lions. Meanwhile, scheduling changes due to inclement weather meant that the Florida State Seminoles ended up playing three duals on the third day of competition; the Seminoles suffered a loss to USC in the winners bracket before overcoming the LSU Tigers, Loyola Marymount Lions and UCLA Bruins in the elimination bracket to set up a rematch against the Trojans. In the championship dual, USC defeated Florida State 3–1 to win their fourth NCAA title. The final three days of the NCAA championship were attended by a live audience of 10,151, setting a new tournament record.

== Background ==
The National Collegiate Athletic Association (NCAA) began sponsoring women's beach volleyball as a championship sport in 2016, and the sport has since experienced rapid growth at the collegiate level, with a 500 percent increase in women's collegiate beach volleyball programs in the United States from 2011 to 2020. The NCAA Beach Volleyball Championship is the tournament held at the end of every regular season to determine the women's national collegiate champion across all NCAA divisions. It has been held annually since the inaugural 2016 event, (Note: Except in 2020 when the championship was canceled due to the COVID-19 pandemic.) and 2022 marked its sixth edition. The 2022 tournament was held in Gulf Shores, Alabama, the same venue that hosted all five previous NCAA championships, and was co-hosted by Gulf Shores Orange Beach Sports & Events, the city of Gulf Shores and the University of Alabama at Birmingham. (Note: Before the NCAA-sanctioned championship, the American Volleyball Coaches Association (AVCA) also hosted a national championship for collegiate beach volleyball at the same Gulf Shores venue from 2012 to 2015.)

Popularized on the beaches of California in the 1920s, beach volleyball is a sport played by two teams on a sand court. At the professional level, teams consist of a pair of players who compete in best-of-three-set matches, where the first two sets are played to 21 points and the third set, if necessary, is played to 15 points; each set must be won by a minimum two-point lead. Conversely, NCAA beach volleyball is played using a flighted team-dual format such that in an NCAA dual, each team fields five individual pairs who are ranked from No. 1 to No. 5 by skill level, and each pair plays a best-of-three-set match against their corresponding pair on the other team. The first team to win three of the five pairs' matches wins the dual.

The NCAA Beach Volleyball Championship had historically been an eight-team double-elimination tournament, in which all participating teams were selected by the NCAA Women's Beach Volleyball Committee. However, with the growing popularity of the collegiate sport, the NCAA doubled the field for the 2022 championship, adding a 16-team single-elimination opening round that led into the established eight-team double-elimination bracket. Along with the expanded field, the qualification process introduced eight automatic bids that teams earned by winning their respective conference tournaments.

== Format and venue ==
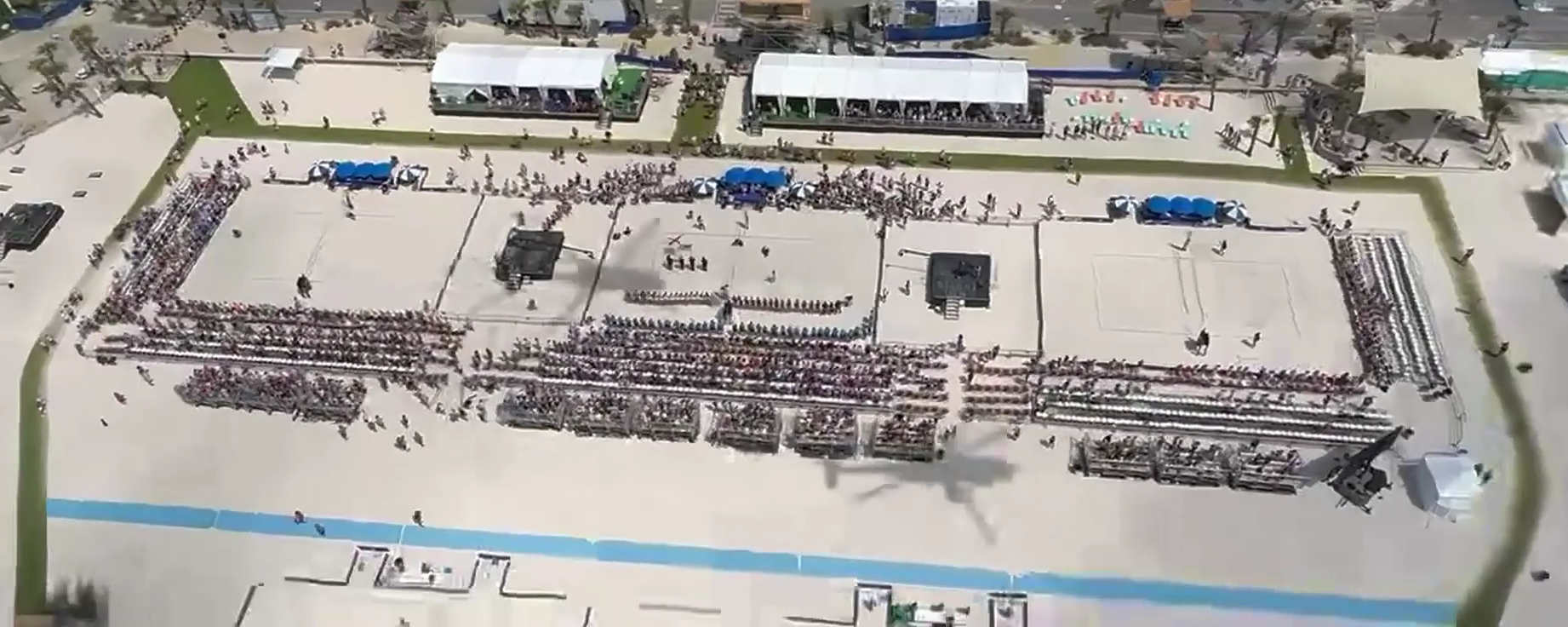
The public beach in Gulf Shores served as the tournament site (pictured in 2023).

The 2022 NCAA Beach Volleyball Championship was a 16-team tournament held from May 4 to 8, 2022. The tournament began on Wednesday, May 4, with eight single-elimination duals. The winning teams then advanced to a double-elimination bracket that began play on Friday, May 6, until a national champion was determined on Sunday, May 8.

The tournament took place on one site at the Gulf Place Public Beach in Gulf Shores, which had been set up with five playing courts and five practice courts. Over the years, the playing conditions at the Gulf Shores venue have been characterized by several factors; namely the compact sand that makes it easier for players to move and jump, the strong winds, and the possibility of rain during that time of the year.

== Participating teams ==
Of the 86 eligible NCAA teams, a total of 16 qualified for the tournament and were seeded from No. 1 to No. 16. Eight of the teams earned automatic bids by winning their respective conference tournaments. The remaining eight bids were allocated by the NCAA Women's Beach Volleyball Committee, with two teams from the eastern region of the country and two teams from the western region chosen as regional qualifiers, and the final four teams selected at large. The qualifying teams and seeding order were announced by the committee on April 30, 2022.

=== Automatic bids ===
The following eight teams earned automatic bids by winning their conference tournament.

Team	Conference	Date qualified	Win–loss record	Appearance	Last bid	Ref
Texas A&M–Corpus Christi Islanders	Southland	April 24, 2022	21–12	1st	–	
Stetson Hatters	ASUN	April 25, 2022	23–16	3rd	2019	
Cal Poly Mustangs	Big West	April 30, 2022	23–16	3rd	2021	
Florida State Seminoles	CCSA	April 30, 2022	28–9	6th	2021	
USC Trojans	Pac-12	April 29, 2022	32–1	6th	2021	
Georgia State Panthers	C-USA	April 30, 2022	26–11	2nd	2016	
Loyola Marymount Lions	West Coast	April 30, 2022	29–7	2nd	2021	
UT Martin Skyhawks	Ohio Valley	April 30, 2022	17–8	1st	–	

=== Regional and at-large bids ===
The following eight teams were allocated either a regional or an at-large bid by the NCAA selection committee.

Team	Conference	Bid type	Win–loss record	Appearance	Last bid	Ref
Florida Atlantic Owls	C-USA	East Region	22–10	1st	–	
TCU Horned Frogs	CCSA	East Region	38–3	2nd	2021	
Grand Canyon Antelopes	– (Note: The Grand Canyon beach volleyball team was competing independently of any conference at the time.)	West Region	26–6	1st	–	
UCLA Bruins	Pac-12	West Region	31–7	6th	2021	
California Golden Bears	Pac-12	At-Large	26–12	1st	–	
Hawaii Rainbow Wāhine	Big West	At-Large	24–16	5th	2019	
LSU Tigers	CCSA	At-Large	30–10	5th	2021	
Stanford Cardinal	Pac-12	At-Large	24–11	2nd	2021	

=== Preview ===
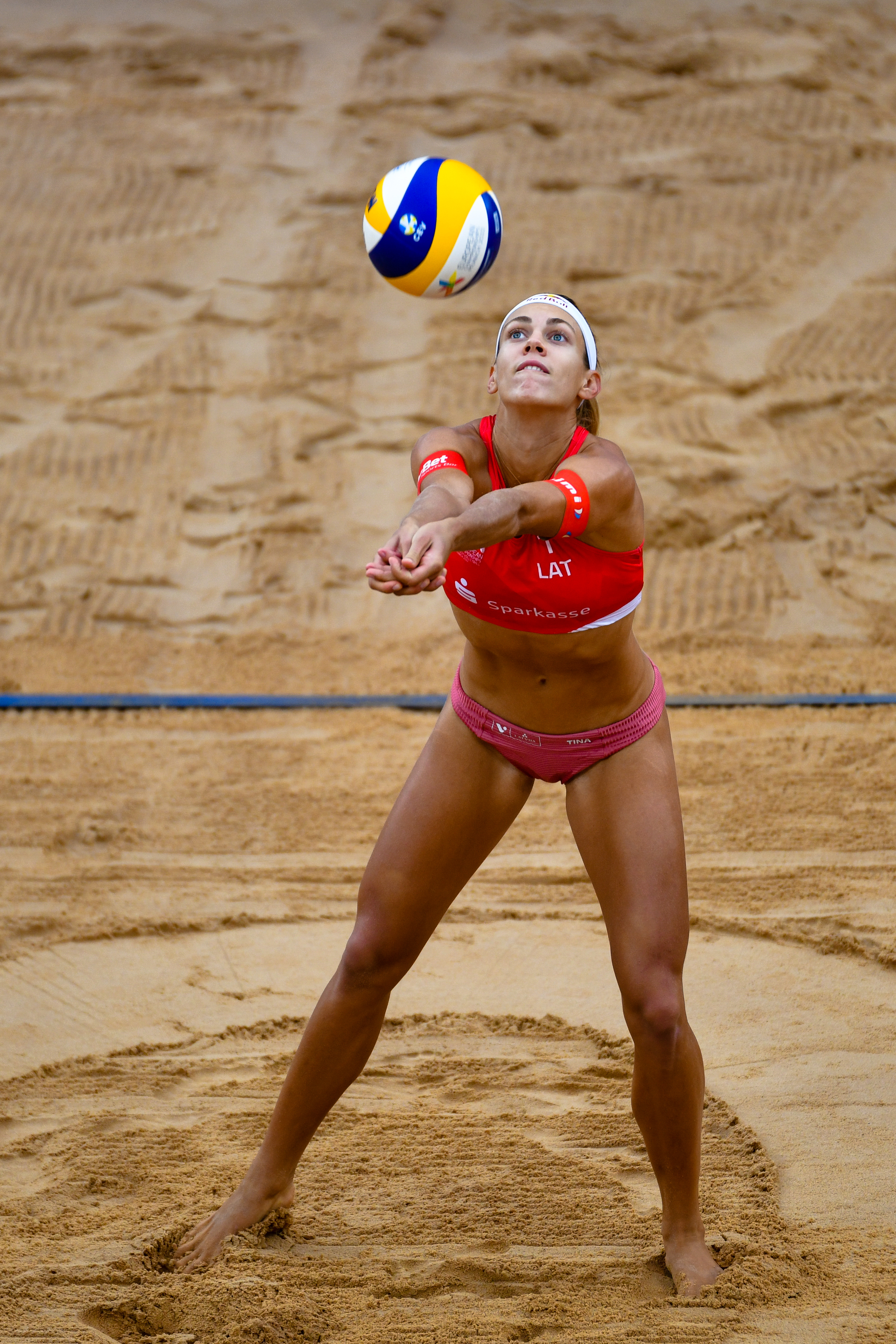
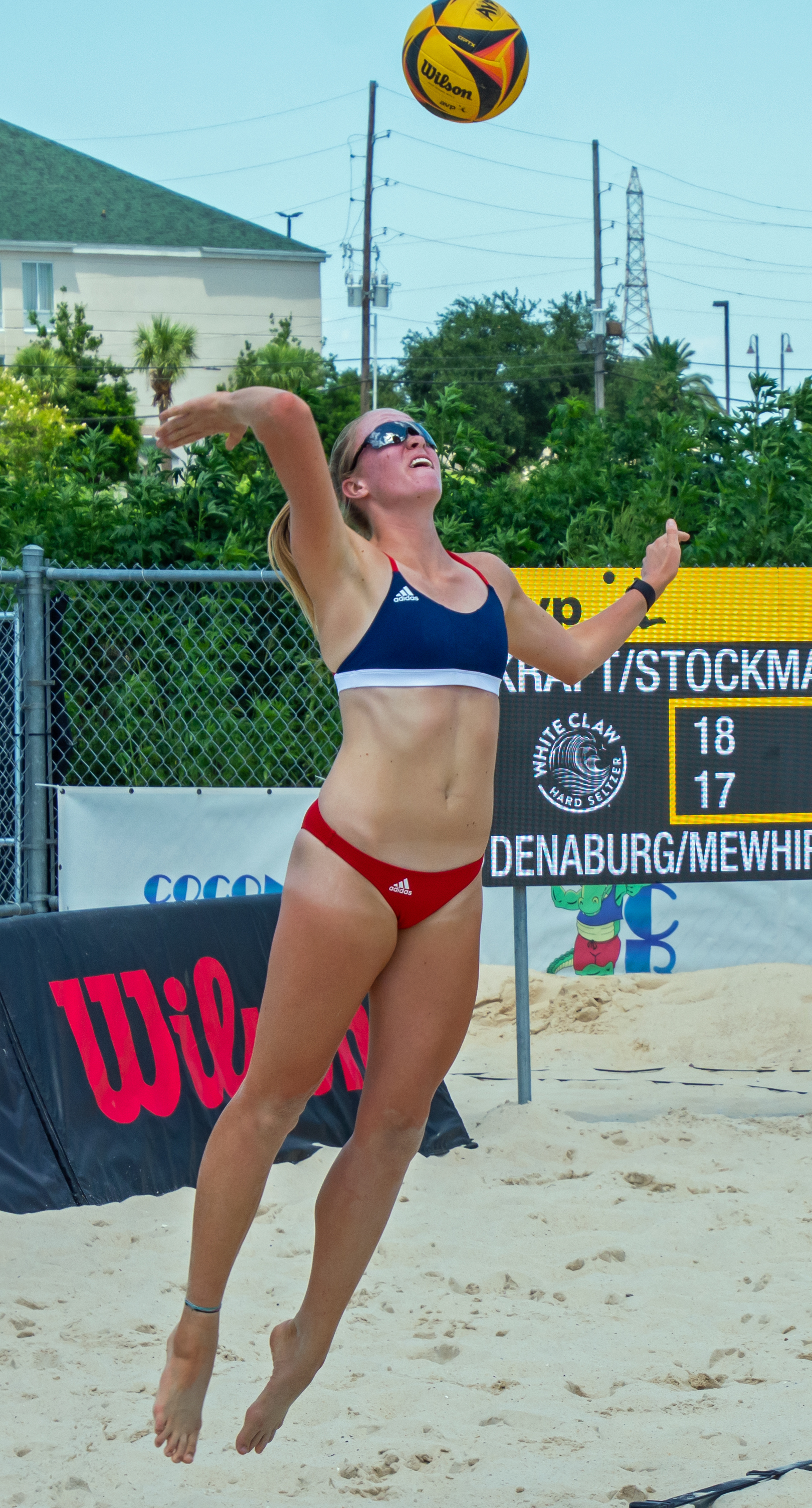
USC's roster included Olympian Tina Graudina (left, pictured in 2022) and U19 world champion Megan Kraft (right, pictured in 2022).

From its inception in 2016 to 2021, only two teams had won the NCAA Beach Volleyball Championship: the USC Trojans (three titles and defending champion: 2016, 2017, 2021) and the UCLA Bruins (two titles: 2018 and 2019). Both teams were in the running for the title once again in 2022. Led by Dain Blanton for the third year, USC had a much-heralded 2021–22 roster that was compared to the Marvel Comics' Avengers by Volleyball Magazine's Travis Mewhirter. It included the likes of 2020 Olympian Tina Graudina of Latvia and then-reigning U19 world champions Megan Kraft and Delaynie Maple. Seeded No. 1 and topping the American Volleyball Coaches Association's (AVCA) rankings, the Trojans entered the NCAA tournament as the favorites to win. They were on a 31-dual winning streak, with their only dual loss coming at the start of the season to UCLA, whom they later beat in the Pac-12 final. Meanwhile, the Bruins were ranked third in the nation and received the No. 3 seed. A finalist at the 2021 NCAA championship, UCLA's roster featured six returning starters from last year's lineup, including AVCA first-team All-Americans Lexy Denaburg and Abby Van Winkle. Head coach Stein Metzger was in his tenth year with the program.

In the Coastal Collegiate Sports Association (CCSA), the fourth-ranked Florida State Seminoles had upset the second-ranked TCU Horned Frogs in the final to win their sixth consecutive conference title. Both teams headed to the NCAA tournament as the No. 5 and No. 2 seeds, respectively. The national runners-up in 2016 and 2018, Florida State's head coach Brooke Niles said it had been a rocky year for her team, which posted a 9–8 win–loss record against the top-ten teams, including six losses to the top three. Meanwhile, TCU had started off the season with one of the most anticipated rosters thanks to several key transfers and freshmen recruited by head coach Hector Gutierrez, such as former European junior championship silver medalist Ana Vergara of Spain.

Rounding out the top six seeds were the Loyola Marymount Lions (No. 4) and LSU Tigers (No. 6). Loyola Marymount were coming off their third consecutive West Coast tournament win, and head coach John Mayer believed this was his program's "most talent[ed]" lineup yet. On LSU's side, there had been a lot of uncertainty over the team in the preseason. After a highly successful 2020–21 season, the Tigers experienced a huge turnover that resulted in the loss of eight of their ten previous starters. Led by head coach Russell Brock, LSU recorded just one win against one of the top five seeds over the regular season. Lee Feinswog, writing for Volleyball Magazine, observed in his tournament preview that the top six seeds had dominated the 2021–22 season, having only suffered a combined total of 37 losses, mostly to each other.

== Bracket ==
The tournament bracket was as follows:

Opening round Wednesday, May 4	Winners bracket: Round 1 Friday, May 6	Winners bracket: Round 2; ~~Friday, May 6~~ (Note: These two winners bracket duals were originally scheduled to be played on Friday, May 6, 2022. However, rain delays on Friday led to both duals being rescheduled for Saturday, May 7 instead.); Saturday, May 7	Winners bracket: Round 3 Saturday, May 7	Championship; Sunday, May 8
1	USC	3
16	UT Martin	0
1	USC	3
8	Florida Atlantic	0
8	Florida Atlantic	3
9	Stanford	0
1	USC	3
5	Florida State	1
5	Florida State	3
12	Cal Poly	2
5	Florida State	3
4	Loyola Marymount	1
4	Loyola Marymount	3
13	Hawaii	0
1	USC	3
3	UCLA	0
3	UCLA	3
14	Stetson	2
3	UCLA	3
6	LSU	0
6	LSU	3
11	California	2
3	UCLA	3
10	Georgia State	0
7	Grand Canyon	2
10	Georgia State	3
10	Georgia State	3	1	USC	3
2	TCU	2	5	Florida State	1
2	TCU	3
15	A&M–Corpus Christi	0
Elimination bracket: Round 1 Friday, May 6	Elimination bracket: Round 2 Saturday, May 7	Elimination bracket: Round 3 Saturday, May 7	Elimination bracket: Round 4 Sunday, May 8
10	Georgia State	1
8	Florida Atlantic	0	4	Loyola Marymount	3
4	Loyola Marymount	3	3	UCLA	2
4	Loyola Marymount	0	5	Florida State	3
5	Florida State	3
6	LSU	1
6	LSU	3	5	Florida State	3
2	TCU	2

== Dual summaries ==
=== Wednesday ===
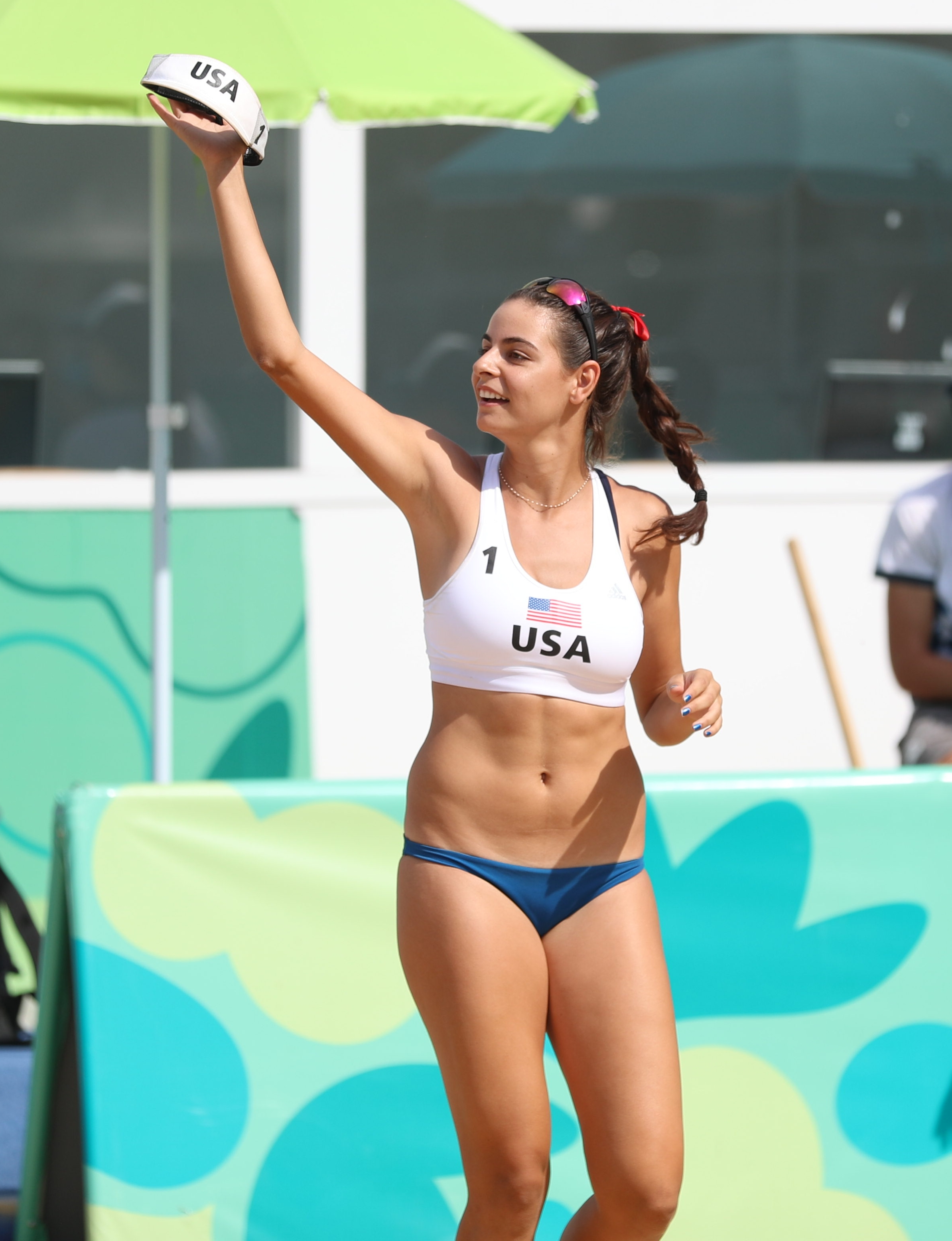
Devon Newberry (pictured in 2018) helped UCLA clinch the dual against Stetson.

Day one of the competition saw all 16 teams competing on a five-court setup in the opening knockout round. Of the eight duals played, seven ended with the higher-seeded team winning. The only upset came when tenth-seeded Georgia State beat seventh-seeded Grand Canyon 3–2, marking the Panthers' first-ever dual win at the NCAA tournament. Grand Canyon took an early lead with a straight-set victory at the top pairs flight before Georgia State evened the dual with a three-set victory at the fourth flight. The deadlock continued as they split three-set victories at the No. 3 and No. 5 pairs. The deciding match came down to the second flight, where Georgia State's Eden Hawes and Maddy Delmonte came back from being one set down to win 13–21, 21–17, 16–14.

LSU, Florida State and UCLA were all pushed to a deciding three-set match in their 3–2 dual victories. LSU were tied at two dual points apiece against California before their No. 5 pairing of Sierra Caffo and Ashlyn Rasnick-Pope defeated California's Natalie Martin and Alex Young-Gomez in three sets to give them the victory. Meanwhile, Florida State was tied 2–2 in their dual against Cal Poly when their No. 3 pairing of Anna Long and Kate Privett found themselves down 10–12 in the third-set tiebreaker of the deciding match. Long and Privett eventually turned the set around, winning 25–23, 21–16, 15–13 to clinch the dual for the Seminoles. Similarly, the UCLA–Stetson dual came down to the second pairs' court, where UCLA's Jaden Whitmarsh and Devon Newberry fell behind in the third set before rallying to beat their Stetson opponents 19–21, 21–16, 15–13. Stetson coach Kristina Hernandez said about the loss: "We can't be disappointed with the effort. I thought we could pull it off again (like in 2019). But they're all freshmen and sophomores, so we'll be back."

Florida Atlantic, Loyola Marymount, USC and TCU all swept their lower-seeded opponents 3–0. In Florida Atlantic's case, it was the program's first-ever dual win at the championship. They defeated Stanford with a two-set victory on court No. 4 and three-set victories on courts No. 2 and No. 5. The Owls' head coach Capri Grotowski was cancer-stricken at the time and did not attend the dual, with her husband and assistant coach Steve Grotowski taking over her duties. TCU also saw their first NCAA tournament victory, knocking out A&M-Corpus Christi without dropping a set. Meanwhile, USC extended their dual win streak to 32 with a dominant performance that left UT Martin unable to score more than 13 points a set.

=== Friday ===
The start of the eight-team double-elimination bracket on Friday was marked by rain delays and strong winds. The first matchup of the day saw USC's win streak continue—now at 33 consecutive duals—as they swept past Florida Atlantic 3–0. A rainstorm rolled in after this dual, delaying the subsequent matches and causing the last two winners bracket duals scheduled for the day to be moved to the next morning instead.

When play resumed, three more winners bracket duals were completed. The first saw Florida State take on Loyola Marymount. The teams were level after Florida State's Alaina Chacon and Madison Fitzpatrick won the second pairs flight and Loyola Marymount's Isabelle Reffel and Jacinda Ramirez won the fifth. However, this was followed by two straight-set victories by Florida State's No. 1 and No. 3 pairs to give them the 3–1 dual win. After that, UCLA were untroubled by LSU, winning two-set matches at the first, third and fifth pairs flights to win the dual 3–0.

The final winners bracket dual of the day featured Georgia State pulling off another upset, this time relegating second-seeded TCU to the elimination bracket. TCU gained the early advantage, winning on the first and fifth courts, while also being up a set on the other three. However, the Georgia State pairs rallied to push the remaining matches to three sets. Angel and Bella Ferary scored the first dual point for Georgia State with a 16–14 third set win on court No. 4. At the second pairs flight, Hawes and Delmonte tied the dual with a 15–13 third set win. The deciding match came down to the No. 3 pairings, where Georgia State's Yasmin Kuck and Kayla Whetstone edged out their TCU opponents 16–21, 23–21, 15–13. Georgia State's victory was the biggest upset in the tournament's history at the time. Post-match, their head coach Beth Van Fleet said: "We just keep focusing on going 1–0. We're not trying to win a national championship. We're here to go 1–0 every time we play."

In the elimination bracket, Loyola Marymount and LSU won their duals to progress to the final six. The former had a swift 3–0 victory over Florida Atlantic, while the latter had a tougher battle against TCU. LSU fell behind early on and were down a set at the No. 1, 2, 4 and 5 pairs. They eventually lost at the first and fourth pairs flights, but rallied to win at the second and third, tying the score with TCU. The remaining match on court No. 5 finished soon after, with LSU's Caffo and Rasnick-Pope edging out their opponents 18–16 in the third set. Having lost twice to TCU earlier in the season, LSU coach Brock said afterwards: "I'd rather lose four times and come here and beat them and be extremely gratified and proud of these kids for battling that way."

=== Saturday ===
The third day of competition saw the field withered down to the final three. The day kicked off with the rescheduled winners bracket duals from the previous day. In the first dual, USC defeated Florida State 3–1. USC dropped their first match of the tournament at the second pairs flight when Kraft and Sammy Slater lost in two sets to Florida State's A. Chacon and Fitzpatrick; it was Kraft and Slater's first loss of the season. However, the defending champions won at the No. 1 (Graudina and Hailey Harward), No. 3 (Maple and Julia Scoles) and No. 4 (Audrey and Nicole Nourse) pairs to move on to the final round of the winners bracket. Next, UCLA sent Georgia State to the elimination bracket with a 3–0 victory. At the No. 3 pairs flight, UCLA's Lea Monkhouse and Jessie Smith scored the first dual point, continuing their undefeated run in the tournament with a 21–17, 21–13 win over Georgia State's Kuck and Whetstone. Their teammates at the first pairs (Denaburg and Van Winkle) and second pairs (Whitmarsh and Newberry) flights soon followed with their own straight set victories to end the dual.

The teams then had a five-hour break before it was time for the elimination bracket duals. Both Loyola Marymount vs. Georgia State and Florida State vs. LSU ended 3–1 in favor of the higher seeds. In the first dual, the Ferary sisters scored the first point for Georgia State on the fourth court. However, the Loyola Marymount pairings won the next three matches on courts No. 3, No. 2 and No. 5. The next team to advance was Florida State, who went 2–0 up over LSU with commanding wins from their No. 4 pairing of Morgan Chacon and Jordan Polo and their No. 1 pairing of Maddie Anderson and Brook Bauer. However, LSU's Holly Carlton and Reilly Allred came back from one set down to win their match on court three. With only the second and fifth flights remaining, Florida State had match points on both courts, and their No. 2 pairing of A. Chacon and Fitzpatrick ultimately won their match first to close out the dual.

With four teams left in the tournament, duals from here on out were played in staggered flights: the No. 2 and No. 4 pairs played their matches to completion first, followed by the No. 1, No. 3 and No. 5 pairs playing theirs to decision. In the final winners bracket round, USC and UCLA faced off for a guaranteed spot in the championship final. The Pac-12 rivals had already played each other five times this season, with the Bruins winning the first meeting and the Trojans the subsequent four. This time around, USC swept UCLA 3–0 to extend their dual win streak to 35. Their second (Kraft and Slater) and fourth (the Nourses) pairs both won their matches in straight sets, with Audrey Nourse saying afterwards: "The mindset was to set the tone for our team. ... And we just wanted to go in super aggressive from the very beginning and play our game." The next round of staggered matches began and USC only needed one more pairs win, which they got on the first court when Graudina and Harward beat Denaburg and Van Winkle 21–16, 21–13. UCLA coach Metzger said after the dual: "SC put together a really great match. They handled us."

The last matchup of the day was Florida State vs. Loyola Marymount. It was Florida State's third dual of the day due to the scheduling changes. Florida State's No. 2 (A. Chacon and Fitzpatrick) and No. 4 (M. Chacon and Polo) pairs gave them the lead after the first round of staggered matches, both winning in straight sets. The next three matches saw closer battles on courts one and three, but Florida State's fifth pairs flight of Caitlin Moon and Raelyn White defeated Loyola Marymount's Reffel and Ramirez 21–19, 21–14 to win the dual for the Seminoles.

=== Sunday ===
The final round of the elimination bracket was between UCLA and Florida State to determine who would face USC for the NCAA title. The two teams had met twice earlier in the season, with UCLA winning 3–2 both times. This time, however, it was Florida State who came out on top after a "marathon" dual that was a toss-up until the very end. The first staggered flights featuring the No. 2 and No. 4 pairings were tightly contested, with the Bruins claiming the first set in both matches before the Seminoles fought back and forced third sets in both, eventually tying the dual score at 1–1. In the next round, the teams split straight-set victories at the No. 3 and No. 5 pairs to continue the stalemate. The match between the No. 1 pairings of UCLA's Denaburg and Van Winkle and Florida State's Anderson and Bauer would thus decide the dual. Anderson and Bauer won the first set 21–16, but Denaburg and Van Winkle rebounded and won the second 23–21. In the final set, Anderson and Bauer flipped an early one-point deficit and held on to their slim lead to win with a score of 15–13. Post-dual, UCLA coach Metzger said: "It felt like a week-long match. It was not a good start by us, but I have to credit them with righting the ship after a while and really settling into the game by making some incredible plays."

==== Championship dual ====
The championship dual was a rematch between USC and Florida State. It was the former's fifth championship final and the latter's third. Once again, the second and fourth pairs flights played their matches first, with the Nourses getting the first win on court No. 4 for the Trojans. At the second pairs flight, USC's Kraft and Slater won the first set, but Florida State's A. Chacon and Fitzpatrick fought back to take the match 14–21, 24–22, 17–15. Both teams were thus tied at one point apiece as the next three matches began. Graudina and Harward won their match on the No. 1 court in two sets next to give USC the lead. The defending champions were up a set on both of the remaining courts, and their No. 3 pairing of Maple and Scoles wrapped up the dual with a straight set win over Florida State's Long and Privett. The victory gave the Trojans their second consecutive NCAA title, and their fourth overall. They were undefeated the whole tournament and extended their streak to 36 dual wins in a row.

Volleyball Magazine's Feinswog felt that USC's path to the national title did not come as easily as the results would suggest. He credited Florida State for putting up a fight till the end, noting that they had a particularly grueling final two days in the tournament due to the scheduling changes. Coach Niles agreed that her Florida State team "fought for everything", adding: "I told my team, we're not hanging our heads low. We should be proud of that second-place trophy." After the victory, USC's Graudina said she was "emotionally charged" and ready for the next stage of her career. Her fellow graduating teammates Harward and Scoles also expressed their intention to pursue professional beach volleyball.

May 8, 2022	#1 USC Trojans	3–1	#5 Florida State Seminoles

Report	Individual matches
Tina Graudina/Hailey Harward	2–0	Maddie Anderson/Brook Bauer	21–17, 21–15
Megan Kraft/Sammy Slater	1–2	Alaina Chacon/Madison Fitzpatrick	21–14, 22–24, 15–17
Delaynie Maple/Julia Scoles	2–0	Anna Long/Kate Privett	25–23, 21–12
Audrey Nourse/Nicole Nourse	2–0	Morgan Chacon/Jordan Polo	21–18, 21–16
Mollie Ebertin/Sunny Villapando	1–0	Caitlin Moon/Raelyn White	21–15, 16–19 DNF

== Post-tournament honors and records ==
=== All-Tournament Team ===
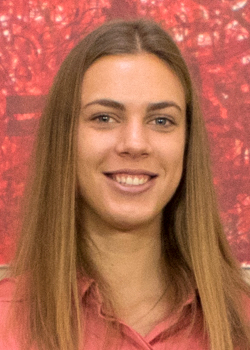
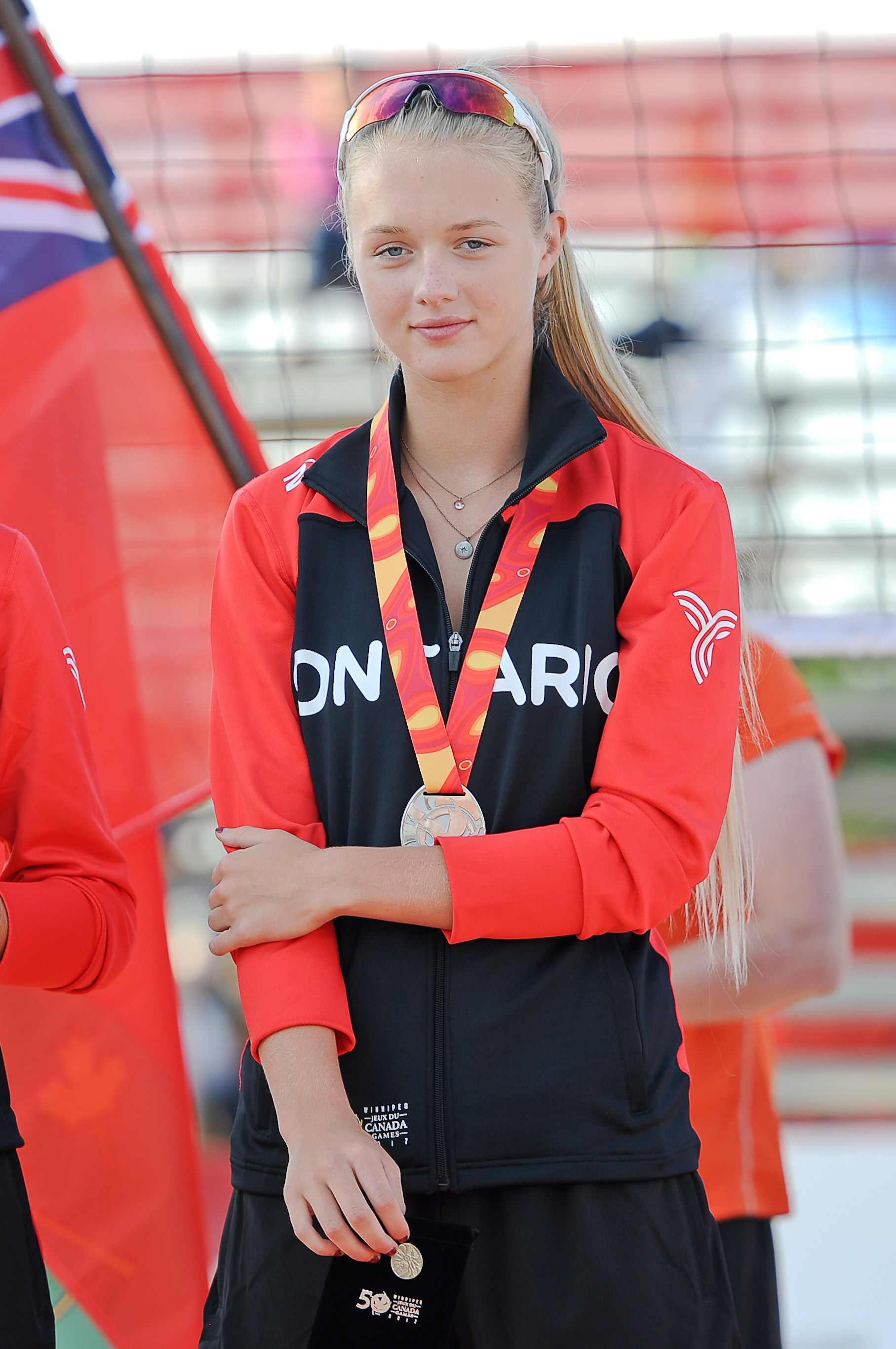
USC's Tina Graudina (left, pictured in 2019) and UCLA's Lea Monkhouse (right, pictured in 2017) were among the ten players named to the All-Tournament Team.

The following pairs were named to the NCAA All-Tournament Team:

Pair	School	Player 1	Player 2
No. 1	USC	Tina Graudina	Megan Kraft
No. 2	Florida State	Alaina Chacon	Madison Fitzpatrick
No. 3	UCLA	Lea Monkhouse	Jessie Smith
No. 4	USC	Audrey Nourse	Nicole Nourse
No. 5	Loyola Marymount	Isabelle Reffel	Jacinda Ramirez

=== Individual match records ===
The following individual match records were set. (Note: A "kill" is an attack that directly scores a point. "Hitting percentage" is the number of kills minus the number of errors, divided by the number of attempts. A "dig" is a defensive play that stops an opponent's attack from being grounded. A "block" is a defensive play that stops an opponent's attack from crossing the net.)

- Most kills: 28 by Ellie Austin in Florida Atlantic vs. Stanford on May 4
- Highest hitting percentage: .941 by Lea Monkhouse in UCLA vs. Stetson on May 4 (also the all-time record)
- Most digs: 31 by Rileigh Powers in UCLA vs. Florida State on May 8
- Most blocks: 8 by Sierra Caffo in LSU vs. Florida State on May 7

=== Other records ===
The following pairs set the all-time record for most tournament wins by a pair with four wins each:

- Tina Graudina and Hailey Harward, USC
- Alaina Chacon and Madison Fitzpatrick, Florida State
- Lea Monkhouse and Jessie Smith, UCLA
- Isabelle Reffel and Jacinda Ramirez, Loyola Marymount

Florida State also set the all-time record for total team pair wins with 18 wins.

== Broadcast and attendance ==
The opening single-elimination round on May 4, 2022, and the double-elimination rounds on May 6 were broadcast live on ESPNU. The May 7 and 8 rounds, including the championship dual, were broadcast live on ESPN2. Additionally, all individual matches were livestreamed on ESPN3. Of the Sunday, May 8, broadcasts, the USC–Florida State championship dual was watched by 123,000 viewers, while the UCLA–Florida State dual was watched by 117,000 viewers.

Over the May 6–8 three-day weekend, the NCAA championship was also attended by a live audience of 10,151, a tournament record and a nearly seven-percent increase from 2019. (Note: No attendance in 2020 and 2021 due to the COVID-19 pandemic.) According to the Gulf Shores tourism board, this translated to an economic impact of $1.51 million for the host city.
