= Fight Panthers =

"Fight Panthers" is the fight song of the Georgia State Panthers, the athletics teams for Georgia State University (GSU). "Fight Panthers" is the third GSU fight song since the athletics programs were created. The fight song was introduced prior to the 2010 football season. The previous fight songs were "Panther Pride" and "Blue and Red".

== History ==
Georgia State has had three fight songs since its athletics teams began competing. The first one, "Red and Blue", was replaced by "Panther Pride" which remained in place (with at least two modifications) until just prior to the 2010 football season. "Panther Pride" had gained the nickname "the Panther Polka" due to its upbeat tempo. After a rebranding of the schools athletics, the new fight song "Fight Panthers" was released, its composition assisted by Furman's director of athletic bands Jay Bocook. Prior to the 2015-16 basketball season, the decision was made to change a lyric in the song from "Georgia State is in the fight" to "Georgia State will win the fight."

== Uses ==
The fight song is often featured outside of sports events, namely during pep rallies and other school sponsored events.

=== Football ===
At football games, the fight song is featured prior to kickoff during the "Panther Walk", when the football team enters the Georgia State Stadium to begin warm-ups. It is also featured prior to kickoff during the marching band's opening performance, and again during the marching band's half time performance. Generally it is performed while the band is leaving the field.

During football games, the extended version of the fight song is played after the football team performs a significant play.

After a touchdown, the extended version of "Fight Panthers" begins playing, and continues (though significantly dimmed) through the PAT. Once the PAT is scored, the volume is again raised and the fight song finished.

After the completion of the game, the fight song is played.

=== Basketball ===
A pep band is used during basketball games that is significantly smaller than the marching band. Prior to the game the fight song is played. Also, during time outs the fight song is repeated amongst other songs. Following the conclusion of the game, the band performs the fight song.

== Variations ==
There are two versions of "Fight Panthers", one full length and one shortened. The full-length version repeats the verse a second time after the chant "G-S-U, G-S-U, G-A-S-T-A-T-E, STATE!" (during a bridge between the first verse and repeat of that verse). The shortened version only features the first two bars of the extended version and then heads straight into the ending "G-S-U" bar.

After the fight song finishes on both the extended and shortened versions, the 'G-S-U, G-S-U, G-A-S-T-A-T-E, STATE!' chant is repeated again.

The student section often replaces the "G-S-U, G-S-U, G-A-S-T-A-T-E, STATE!" line with " G-S-U, G-S-U, WE'RE GONNA BEAT THE HELL OUT OF YOU, STATE!" They also often replace the "we're gonna give 'em hell" line with "we're gonna kick their ass!"
