= Hayt Golf Learning Center =

Golf facility in Jacksonville, Florida

- Interactive map of Hayt Golf Learning Center
- 30°15′43″N 81°30′35″W

Club information
- Location: Jacksonville, Florida
- Established: 2002
- Type: Public
- Owner: University of North Florida
- Total holes: 3
- Website: thegolfplex.com
- Designed by: Mark McCumber

The Hayt Golf Learning Center, also known as the "Golfplex", is the golf facility on the University of North Florida campus. It is a public course and the practice facility for the North Florida Ospreys golf team.

== History ==
The concept of the Hayt Center began when former golf head coach John Brooks met with former UNF president Adam Herbert and former athletic director Dr. Richard Gropper and was promised the land. Brooks coordinated the funding, design and construction of the center. Local businessman John Hayt initially donated $750,000 to the project. With Hayt's later donation of another $200,000, a $100,000 donation from The First Tee, state funds, and other gifts, the project received about $2 million. UNF did not have to use any funds for the project. The course was designed by professional golfer Mark McCumber. The Hayt Center opened in 2002 and provided the UNF golf team and the campus with its first facility.

== Features ==
The center is set on 38 acres (150,000 m^{2}) on the southeast part of the campus. It features two par threes, and a final hole that can be played as a par 3, 4, or 5. Golf News called the third hole "possibly the best in the area." The center also comprises a lighted driving range and chipping & putting area, and 8,000-square-foot (740 m^{2}) building. It is an "all walking" course, which means there are no golf carts.
