= Pounce (mascot) =

Mascot of Georgia State University

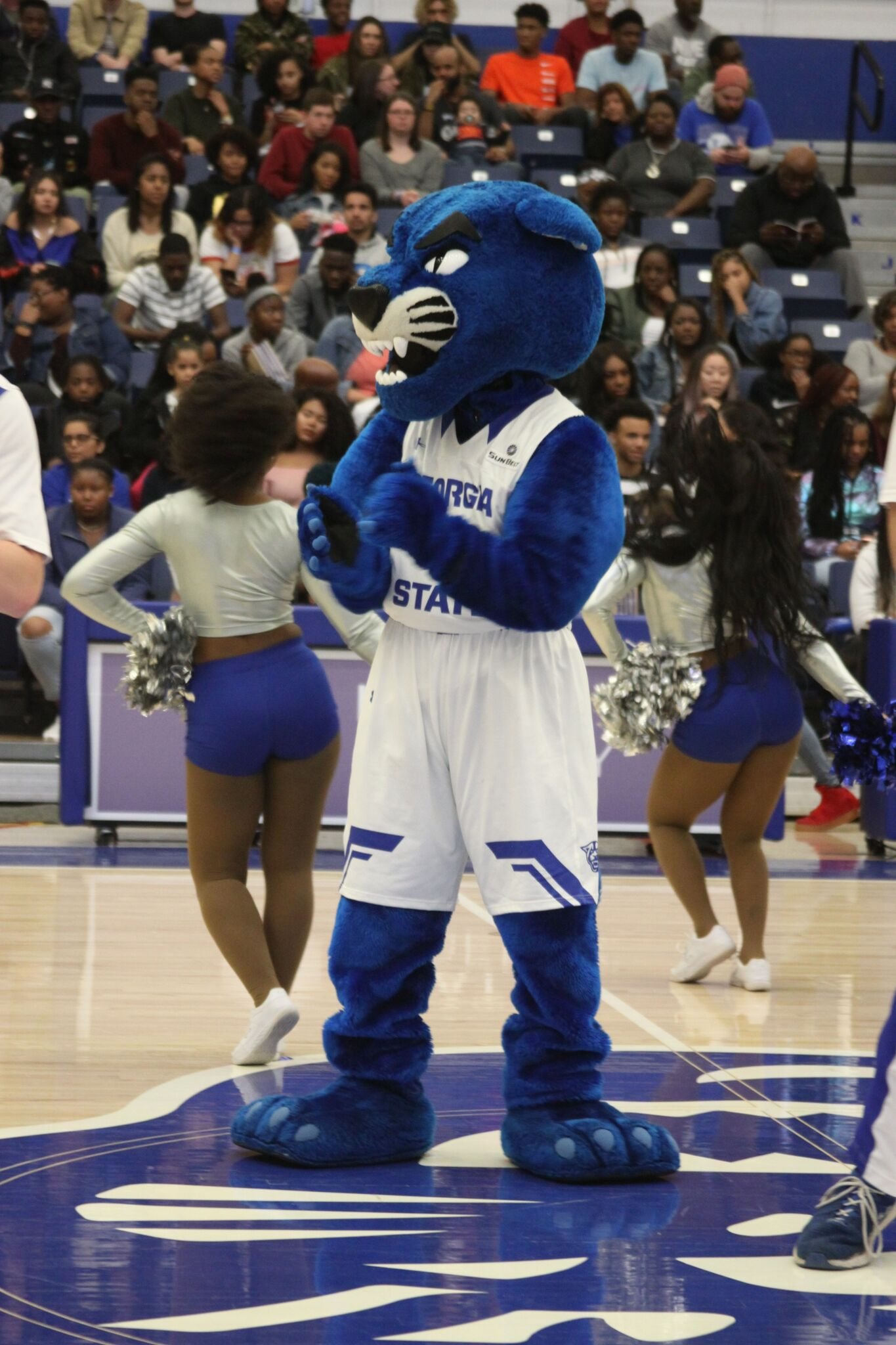
- Pounce, the current Georgia State University mascot.
- University: Georgia State University
- Conference: Sun Belt
- Description: Panther
- First seen: 1993 (updated in 2009)

Pounce is the official mascot of Georgia State University. Pounce is usually represented as a stylized panther with blue fur, sharp white teeth with protruding canines, and black whiskers. He usually wears either the men's basketball outfit (during basketball season) or the University football uniform. Pounce has existed in his current form since 2009, but has existed in two previous forms. Prior to that, a host of other mascots represented Georgia State University.

== Tradition ==
Like many mascots, Pounce communicates via hand gestures and sign language, rather than speech. Pounce is often used in different community projects either sponsored by or held by the university. While Pounce is considered a Panther, a specific definition of which species he is not elaborated on, although he shows considerable likeness to the Florida Panther, which was once native to Georgia. Pounce is 6'0 with a 3-foot tail and favors the colors royal blue and white.

== History ==
Georgia State University has had multiple names and mascots (under its various names), beginning with an Owl in 1940 when the school was Georgia Evening College (due to it being a night school). In 1947, the school would, for no apparent reason, change the athletics teams' names to the Ramblers. This would again change in 1955 to the Panthers, however at that time no mascot existed for the school. Claws the Panther, the first personified blue panther, was created in the early 1980s to support the GSU basketball team. Both the school's student newspaper, the Signal, and the yearbook, The Cauldron, identified the mascot as being played by Jay Black who would later become a professor at Mercer University in Macon, Georgia. In 1989, Urbie, a crimson panther was created, but would only remain until 1993 when a new mascot, Pounce, was unveiled. The original Pounce was a cartoonish, muscular blue panther with yellow eyes, a red nose and four fingers on each hand with yellow claws on each. This remained the university's mascot with slight variations (including more ferocious facial gestures) up until 2009. As the university unveiled its new football team, it also unveiled a new Pounce, complete with a sleeker design. This is the current mascot in use.
