= Georgia State Panthers women's beach volleyball =

Georgia State Panthers women's beach volleyball
| University | Georgia State University |
| Location | Atlanta, Georgia |
| Head coach | Beth Van Fleet |
| Facility | GSU Beach Volleyball Complex |
| Nickname | Panthers |
| Colors | Blue and White |
| Conference | Sun Belt Conference |
| Current Season | |

The Georgia State Panthers women's beach volleyball team represents Georgia State University in the sport of beach volleyball. The Panthers compete in NCAA Division I as a member of the Sun Belt Conference. The Panthers play their home matches at the GSU Sand Volleyball Complex on the university's Atlanta campus, and are currently led by head coach Beth Van Fleet.

== History ==
With the emergence of football at Georgia State University, due to Title IX scholarship restrictions, it was necessary for GSU to increase the number of women's scholarships available in their athletic program

The creation of beach volleyball at Georgia State was announced on September 27, 2011, by Georgia State Athletic Director Cheryl Levick. Construction of the GSU Sand Volleyball Complex, a 340-seat, 3 tiered court set, began in April 2012, and was completed by September 2012. The site has unofficially been nicknamed "The Beach." Originally named as head coach of beach volleyball, head coach Tami Audia was elevated to Director of Volleyball, being replaced by assistant coach Beth Van Fleet in July 2013.

On October 20, 2015, Georgia State joined the Coastal Collegiate Sports Association (CCSA) as a beach volleyball member, coinciding with the NCAA's decision to sponsor it and provide a championship, as well as the addition of beach volleyball as an official CCSA sport (which led to that conference changing its name from the original Coastal Collegiate Swimming Association). This also coincided with the NCAA changing the name of the sport from "sand" to "beach" volleyball.

During the 2020–21 school year, the CCSA entered into a formal beach volleyball partnership with Conference USA (C-USA) that saw the 2021 CCSA tournament split into two divisions, with GSU joining fellow Sun Belt member Louisiana–Monroe and full C-USA members Florida Atlantic, FIU, Southern Miss, and UAB in one of the divisions. After that season, the CCSA and C-USA agreed to split their beach volleyball membership, with the six aforementioned schools and another full Sun Belt member, Coastal Carolina, forming the new C-USA beach volleyball league.

== Year-by-year results ==
| Year | Head Coach | Overall | Conference | Standing | Division | Postseason |
|---|---|---|---|---|---|---|
Georgia State Panthers (Independent) (2013–2015)
| 2013 | Tami Audia | 8–9 | – | – | – | – |
| 2014 | Beth Van Fleet | 14–5 | – | – | – | – |
| 2015 | Beth Van Fleet | 18–3 | – | – | – | 0–2 |
Georgia State Panthers (CCSA) (2016–2021)
| 2016 | Beth Van Fleet | 25–7 | 6–4 | 3rd | – | 0–2 |
| 2017 | Beth Van Fleet | 21–14 | 6–5 | 7th | – | – |
| 2018 | Beth Van Fleet | 24–12 | 9–9 | 6th | – | – |
| 2019 | Beth Van Fleet | 24–12 | | 3rd | – | 3–1 |
| 2020 | Beth Van Fleet | 10–3 | 3–2 | | – | – |
| 2021 | Beth Van Fleet | 23–13 | 8–9 | | – | 2–1 |
Georgia State Panthers (C-USA) (2022–2023)
| 2022 | Beth Van Fleet | 28–13 | C-USA Champions | 1st | – | NCAA Elite 8 |
Georgia State Panthers (SBC) (2023–Present)
| 2023 | Beth Van Fleet | 20–17 | Sun Belt Champions | 1st | – | NCAA 1st Round |
| 2024 | Beth Van Fleet | 26–13 | Sun Belt Champions | 1st | – | NCAA 1st Round |
| 2025 | Beth Van Fleet | 22–17 | Sun Belt Champions | 1st | – | NCAA 1st Round |
| Total | | 241–121 | – | | – | – |

== Home Court/Practice and Training facilities ==
The GSU Beach Volleyball Complex is the home court and practice facility for the women's beach volleyball team.

== See also ==
- Georgia State Panthers
- List of NCAA women's beach volleyball programs
