= Georgia State Panthers =

Intercollegiate teams of Georgia State University

- University: Georgia State University
- Nickname: Panthers
- NCAA: Division I (FBS)
- Conference: Sun Belt
- Athletic director: Charlie Cobb
- Location: Atlanta, Georgia
- Varsity teams: 15 (6 men's, 9 women's)
- Football stadium: Center Parc Credit Union Stadium
- Basketball arena: Georgia State Convocation Center
- Baseball stadium: Georgia State Baseball Complex
- Softball stadium: Robert E. Heck Softball Complex
- Soccer stadium: GSU Soccer Field
- Colors: Blue and white
- Mascot: Pounce
- Fight song: Fight Panthers
- Website: georgiastatesports.com

Sun Belt Conference logo in Georgia State's colors

The Georgia State Panthers are the intercollegiate athletics teams that represent Georgia State University, located in Atlanta, Georgia. All GSU teams compete in the National Collegiate Athletic Association (NCAA) Division I FBS level as members of the Sun Belt Conference, a conference of which they were a charter member. Previously, GSU was a member of the CAA, and prior to that, the ASUN Conference (then known as the Trans America Athletic Conference, or TAAC).

== History ==
=== Prior to their conference affiliation ===
Georgia State became a fully accredited NCAA Division I athletics program in 1963, which saw the university give scholarships at the highest level of competition for college athletics. However, sports did exist at GSU prior to becoming an NCAA member; In 1956, the Panthers began a baseball team, the oldest sport played at Georgia State. Prior to joining the NCAA, no scholarships were given and no sports were part of any national affiliate. When GSU did join the NCAA, only basketball, cross country, golf, and tennis were played as NCAA sports (only men's teams were allowed to compete in the NCAA until 1980). In 1975, five women's sports also joined, playing in the New South Women's Athletic Conference, or NSWAC, a conference of the AIAW.

=== Founding of the Sun Belt Conference ===
In 1976, the Sun Belt Conference was formed with Georgia State being one of its founding members. However, in 1980, the Panthers left the Sun Belt, with the most cited reason being that the conference encouraged its members to play in the largest basketball venue in town; in the case of the Panthers, that was the 16,500 seat Omni Coliseum, an NBA venue where the Atlanta Hawks played. With only a few hundred fans attending each game, this became a joke to media outlets, who purposefully tried to get pictures of the action with a lack of a crowd in the background. After leaving the Sun Belt, the Panthers played as independents for three years before joining the TAAC.

=== Addition of football ===
Once Georgia State entered the CAA, a recurring question of whether the university should add football was brought up, leading to the commissioning of a feasibility study in 2006. After gauging student and alumni interest, the administration found enough support to continue onwards with the effort, leading to the hire of former Atlanta Falcons head coach Dan Reeves as a consultant. This culminated in the official launch of the football program on April 17, 2008. Due to GSU's membership as a part of the CAA, membership into the football division of the conference was sought after, leading to the Panthers being invited to become a football participant for the 2012 season. Due to the addition of men's scholarships (63 full scholarship equivalents for inclusion in the FCS), Title IX regulations required the university to have additional women's scholarships added, leading to the addition of beach volleyball (then called "sand volleyball" and, at the time, a non-NCAA sport).

With the addition of football, a rebrand of athletics took place, changing the logos, fight song, and mascot design. The university also decided to go back on one of its previous institutional name rules in making GSU a secondary name for the university. In February 2012, the university announced that it had commissioned a study to find the feasibility of moving up to the Football Bowl Subdivision (FBS), the highest level of collegiate football, citing that the shifts in landscape due to conference realignment offered opportunities that should be carefully considered. The study was conducted by Collegiate Consulting, who concluded that the university was in a good position to move up to the FBS. On April 9, 2012, Georgia State officially accepted an invitation to rejoin the Sun Belt Conference on July 1, 2013.

=== Relocation to Downtown Atlanta ===
Although the athletic department was housed within the GSU Sports Arena, the limited space available in Downtown Atlanta forced different sports to be played in different areas around Metropolitan Atlanta. A complex in the Panthersville community housed a baseball field, soccer pitch, and softball field, as well as intramural fields, approximately 7 miles from the central campus and not regularly accessible by campus transportation. With the relocation of the Atlanta Braves from Turner Field in Downtown to SunTrust Park, an opportunity for the different Panther athletic programs to relocate to the central campus opened. Georgia State, along with Carter, a real estate company in Atlanta, would bid for the stadium and surrounding lands, eventually purchasing all 68-acres (including the stadium) for $30 million. Between the 2016 and 2017 season, Turner Field would be converted to Center Parc Stadium, a football specific stadium with an initial capacity of 25,000 (that will be increased to 35,000 after future renovations). The stadium also hosts the athletics department (which moved from GSU Sports Arena), and will host the School of Hospitality. The purchase also included the surrounding parking lots, including the footprint of Atlanta–Fulton County Stadium, which housed the Atlanta Braves when they first moved to Atlanta, and where Hank Aaron would break Babe Ruth's home run record. The university plans to erect a new baseball stadium in this footprint for the GSU baseball team to play at.

=== Conference membership ===
- Sun Belt Conference (1976–1981)
- Independent (1981–1983)
- TAAC/Atlantic Sun (1983–2005)
- Colonial Athletic Association (2005–2013)
- Sun Belt Conference (2013–present)

== Sports sponsored ==
Men's sports	Women's sports
Baseball	Basketball
Basketball	Beach volleyball
Football	Cross country
Golf	Golf
Soccer	Soccer
Tennis	Softball
	Tennis
	Track & field^{†}
	Volleyball
† – Track and field includes both indoor and outdoor

=== Men's basketball ===
- First season: 1963
- Conference Championships (6)
  - 2000, 2001, 2002, 2014, 2015, 2019
- Conference Tournament Championships (6)
  - 1991, 2001, 2015, 2018, 2019, 2022
- NCAA Tournament Appearances (6)
  - 1991 (1st round)
  - 2001 (2nd round)
  - 2015 (3rd round)
  - 2018 (1st round)
  - 2019 (1st round)
  - 2022 (1st round)
- NIT Appearances (2)
  - 2002 (1st round)
  - 2014 (1st round)
- CIT Appearances (2)
  - 2012 (2nd round)
  - 2017 (1st round)
- Retired Jerseys
  - 3 Rodney Hamilton
  - 5 Thomas Terrell
  - 13 Kevin Morris

=== Women's basketball ===
- First season: 1975
- Conference Championships (2)
  - 2002, 2003
- Conference Regular Season Champions
  - 2000, 2001, 2002, 2004
- NCAA/AIAW Appearances (4)
  - 1981 (1st Round)
  - 2001 (1st Round)
  - 2002 (1st Round)
  - 2003 (1st Round)
- WNIT Appearances (1)
  - 2000

=== Baseball ===
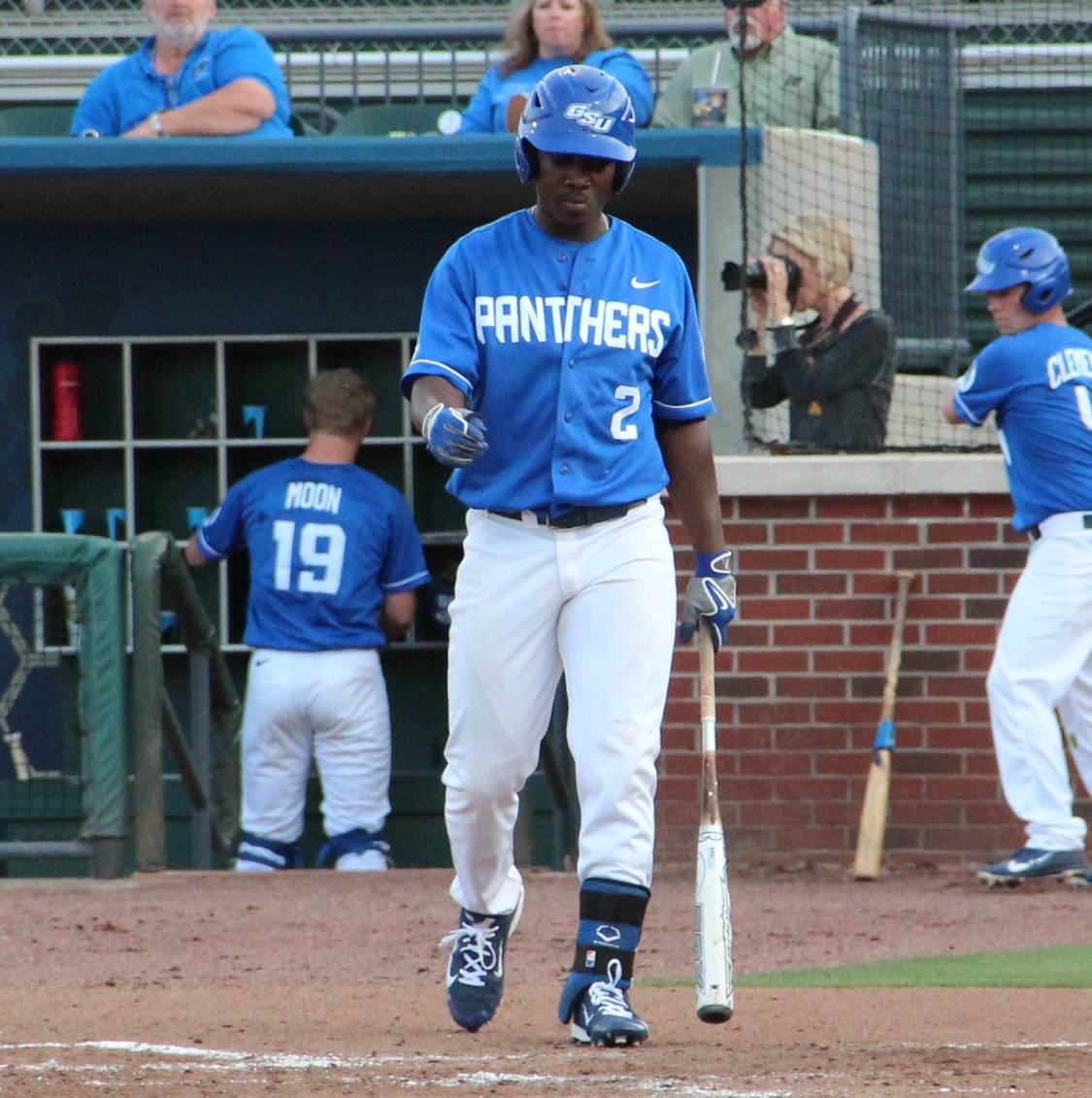
A Panthers baseball player during a 2014 road game

- First season: 1965
- Conference Championships (1)
  - 2009
- NCAA Tournament Appearances (1)
  - 2009
- Retired Jerseys
  - 30 Mike Hurst (head coach)

=== Beach volleyball ===
- First season: 2013
- AVCC National Championship Appearances (1)
  - 2015
- NCAA National Championship Appearances (1)
  - 2016

=== Football ===
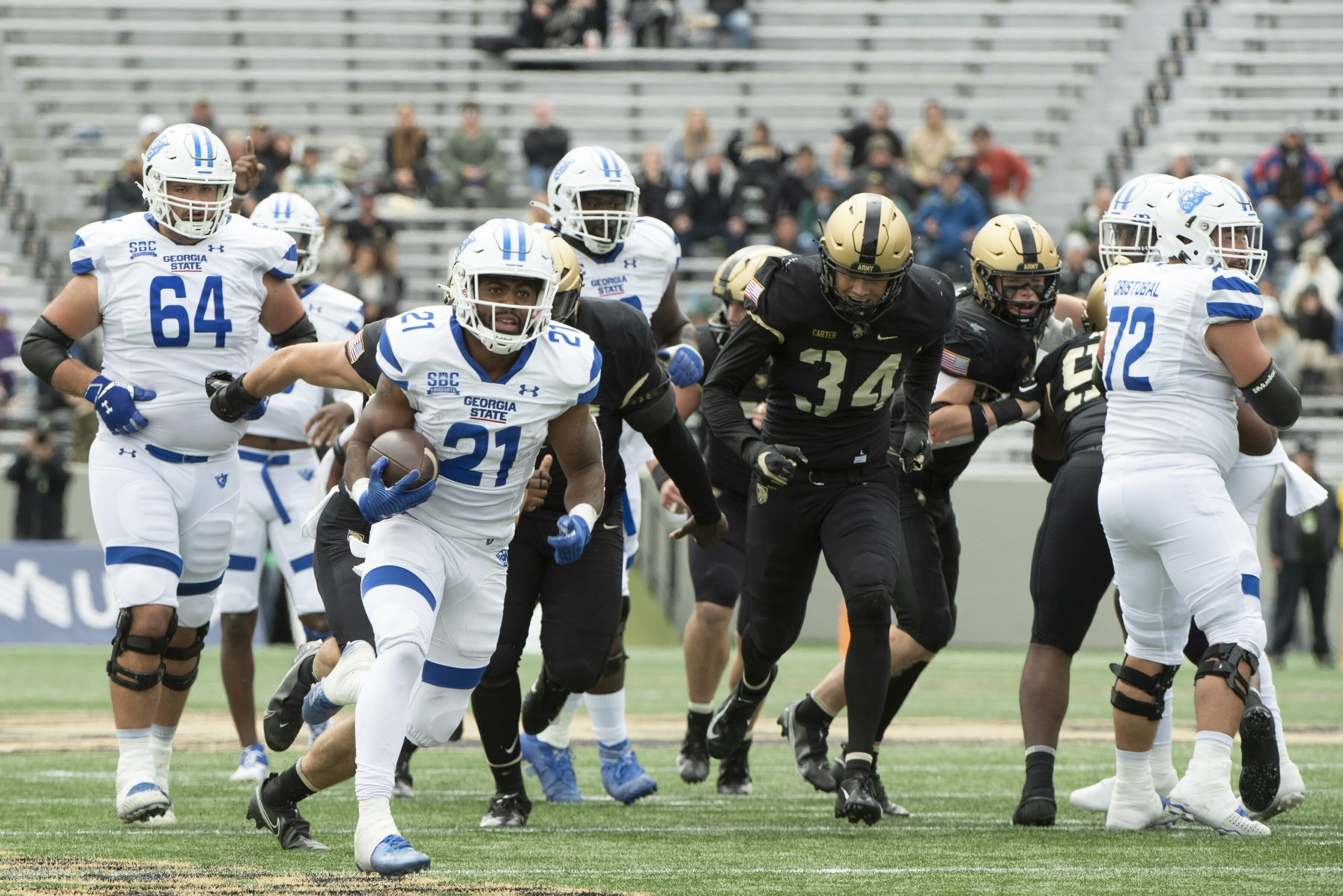
A football game between Georgia State and Army in 2022

- First Season: 2010
- Move to FBS: 2013
- Bowl Games (5)
  - 2015 – Cure Bowl – San Jose State, L
  - 2017 – Cure Bowl – Western Kentucky, W
  - 2019 – Nova Home Loans Arizona Bowl – Wyoming, L
  - 2020 – LendingTree Bowl – Western Kentucky, W
  - 2021- TaxAct Camellia Bowl- Ball State, W

=== Golf ===
==== Men's golf ====
Records for men's golf are incomplete between 1968 and 1988

- Conference Championships (9)
  - 1998, 2000, 2001, 2005, 2006, 2008, 2009, 2014, 2017
- NCAA Regionals
  - 1999, 13th place
  - 2000, 5th place
  - 2001, 18th place
  - 2003, 13th place
  - 2004, 7th place
  - 2005, 4th place
  - 2006, 11th place
  - 2007, 9th place
  - 2008, 17th place
  - 2009, 6th place
  - 2010, 26th place (individual, Tom Sherreard)
  - 2014, 2nd place
- NCAA Championship
  - 2000, unranked
  - 2004, 11th place
  - 2005, 13th place
  - 2007, unranked
  - 2008, 13th place (individual, Joel Sjoholm)
  - 2014, 23rd place

==== Women's golf ====
- Conference Championships (5)
  - 2003, 2005, 2006, 2009, 2010
- NCAA Regionals
  - 2003, 18th place
  - 2005, 17th place
  - 2006, 11th place
  - 2008, 14th place
  - 2009, 9th place
  - 2010, 21st place
  - 2011, 87th place (individual)
  - 2012, unranked (individual)
- NCAA Championship
  - 2006, 43rd place (individual)

=== Soccer ===
==== Men's soccer ====
- First Season: 1968
- Conference Championships (6)
  - 1983, 1986, 1987, 1997, 2000, 2018
- NCAA Appearances (4)
  - 1997, 2000, 2011, 2018

==== Women's soccer ====
- First Season: 1994
- Conference Championships (1)
  - 1997
- NCAA Appearances (1)
  - 1997

=== Softball ===
- First Season: 1985
- Conference Championships (6)
  - 1989, 1990, 1992, 1993, 1994, 2011
- NCAA Tournament Appearances (2)
  - 1994, 2011
- NISC Tournament Appearances (1)
  - 2017

=== Tennis ===
==== Men's tennis ====
Records for men's tennis are incomplete between 1984 and 1987

- First Season: 1959
- Conference Championships (8)
  - 1989, 1998, 1999, 2000, 2002, 2007, 2013, 2017
- NCAA Appearances (7)
  - 1998, 1999, 2000, 2002, 2007, 2013, 2017
- Individual NCAA Appearances (2)
  - 2007 (Martin Stiegwardt), 2013 (Victor Valente)

==== Women's tennis ====
- Sun Belt Conference Championships (2)
  - 2014, 2016

== Rivalries ==
Georgia State has Sun Belt rivalries with all of the East Division schools (Coastal Carolina, Appalachian State, Georgia Southern, Troy, and South Alabama). Georgia State's main Sun Belt rivals are Georgia Southern and South Alabama.

=== Georgia Southern ===
Although Georgia State has only played football since 2010, rivalries have been formed on the basketball court, most notably against Georgia Southern. Both schools participated in the Atlantic Sun Conference (then the TAAC, now the ASUN) between 1983 and 1992. Since the rivalry began, the two teams have played each other 51 times (after the 2015–16 season), with Southern holding the series at 34–17. Since both schools can be abbreviated GSU, a point of conflict between the two schools is that both fan-bases claim that their university is, in fact, the real GSU. Georgia State lays claim to the initials as it became a university (and therefore GSU) long before Georgia Southern did (in 1990; Georgia State became a university in 1969). Also, Georgia State's URL and official logo's both contain the acronym. Georgia Southern doesn't officially recognize GSU as an abbreviation for the school, actively discouraging it in its identification standards, and generally uses GS in its own branding.

The beginning of the football rivalry was initiated after the hire of former Appalachian State (a major rival of Georgia Southern) athletic director Charlie Cobb to the same position at GSU. During Georgia State's press release introducing Cobb, he revealed that Georgia Southern's athletic director Tom Kleinlein told him "welcome, now the war is on." The two teams met on the gridiron during the 2014 football season at Georgia Dome. During the run up to the game, fans from both teams expressed their dislike for the other over social media outlets such as Twitter, at times trending with tags of "SouthernNotState" and "StateNotSouthern" both of which were used as slogans for shirts given out by both universities. During the period before the game, fans dubbed the matchup as "Modern Day Hate," a play on the rivalry between Georgia Tech and UGA, Clean, Old-Fashioned Hate. The game would go on to draw the second largest crowd of any Georgia State game at 28,427, ending with Georgia Southern beating Georgia State by a final score of 69 to 31. In 2015, Georgia State beat Georgia Southern 34–7, the worst home defeat for Georgia Southern in school history. Currently, Georgia State holds a 3–1 lead in the football series.

In October 2015, it was announced that Georgia State and Georgia Southern would begin a rivalry series spanning all of the sports played between the two schools. Each match-up would be worth a point, except football, which would be worth two, and baseball and softball, to which points would be allocated based on the series winner. Any competition in which all competing teams are ranked, the team that ranks higher would earn that point. Bonus points are awarded if a contest occurs during the conference tournament, with an extra bonus point being awarded if the competition results in one of the schools winning an automatic bid a national tournament. The previous years trophy is awarded during a half-time presentation at the two schools football match-up. After its second year, Georgia State leads the series 2–0.

=== South Alabama ===
Both Georgia State and South Alabama's football teams were founded and played their first games within a year of each other, with South Alabama's first season starting in 2009 and Georgia State's first season starting in 2010. After finishing their first season without a loss, South Alabama faced Georgia State on October 30, 2010, who until that point had a 5–3 record. The game was held at South Alabama's home field, Ladd–Peebles Stadium in Mobile, Alabama. The final score, a loss of 34–39, kept South Alabama's perfect record intact while Georgia State fell in their first season to 5–4. This set the stage for the 2011 season game between the two programs.

Georgia State set their home match against South Alabama as their homecoming game. Although South Alabama had already suffered their first loss earlier in the season, Georgia State's record going into the game of 1–5 left the odds in favor of a South Alabama win. However, after seemingly winning the game in regulation time by an interception by Mark Hogan with 8 seconds on the clock, the referees called a false start penalty negating the play. In the second overtime period, Hogan intercepted another ball to win the game, giving one of only three wins on the season, and setting the record at 1–1.

During the 2011–12 offseason, it was announced that Georgia State would join the Sun Belt Conference, the same conference to which South Alabama belonged, setting up yearly games between the two teams.

During the 2014 offseason, South Alabama set their home game against GSU during the 2014–15 season as their homecoming game, announcing the title "Clash of the Claws" to represent the scrimmage, referencing both schools' use of big cats as their mascots.

In 2015, South Alabama visited the Georgia Dome holding a season record of 5–4. A victory by the Jaguars would have granted them instant bowl eligibility. However, Georgia State won the game 24–10. South Alabama would go on to lose the remainder of its 2015 games and be denied a bowl slot.

The series record in football currently stands at 5–4 in Georgia State's favor.

== Traditions ==
=== Nickname and mascot ===
The nickname "Panthers" has existed as the name for all Georgia State teams since 1963, when the university held a student vote to determine what the representing mascot should be. It wasn't until 1989 that an official mascot appeared in the form of Urbie, a crimson panther. This was later replaced in 1993 by an early iteration of the current mascot, Pounce, a blue panther. Pounce's appearance has changed twice since his debut, most recently in 2009 when the current incarnation was presented during a basketball game against Georgia Southern.

The first team name to represent Georgia State was the Owls, used between 1940 and 1947, used as a representation of the schools title at the time of "Georgia Evening College." Between 1947 and 1963, GSU teams went by the name "Ramblers," although no reasoning for why has been presented. The teams were also briefly referred to as the "Crimson Panthers" during the Urbie era.

=== Logo ===
Current Wordmark

The primary athletics logo contains a picture of the newest incarnation of Pounce, the university's mascot. This primary logo is interchangeable with the words Georgia State beneath Pounce.

The secondary logo is an italicized, capitalized GSU in white with blue outlining with a red streak beneath.

The new logos replaced the face of Pounce prior to 2009, as a highly stylized cartoon panther beneath the old Georgia State wordmark.

== Facilities ==
- Men's and women's basketball: Compete at the 8,000 person capacity Georgia State Convocation Center.
- Football: Since the 2017 season, Center Parc Stadium has been the home stadium for the Panthers. The stadium was previously named Georgia State Stadium from 2017-2020. This is the third incarnation of a venue originally built for the 1996 Olympics and Paralympics as Centennial Olympic Stadium and reconfigured into the baseball-specific Turner Field for Major League Baseball's Atlanta Braves, opening in that form in 1997. Following the Braves' move to the venue now known as Truist Park after their 2016 season, GSU bought Turner Field and adjacent property for a major campus expansion project. In its football form, Center Parc Stadium seats slightly more than 24,000, with possible future expansion to 33,000. Before the move to Center Parc Stadium, the Panthers played at the Georgia Dome, an off-campus facility located less than a mile from the central campus that was demolished in 2017 with the completion of Mercedes-Benz Stadium nearby. The Georgia Dome had a capacity of 71,228, but seating for most GSU home games was set at 28,155 unless overflow was needed. Practice fields owned by the school are located south of the main campus on Martin Luther King Drive.
- Volleyball: Compete at the GSU Sports Arena.
- Softball: Compete at Bob Heck field, a school owned off campus facility located east of campus in Panthersville, Georgia.
- Baseball: Currently competes at the Georgia State University Baseball Complex, a school owned off campus facility located east of campus in Panthersville, Georgia. As part of the Turner Field purchase, the university also acquired the former site of Atlanta–Fulton County Stadium, which had been home to the Braves before the opening of Turner Field and the NFL's Atlanta Falcons before the opening of the Georgia Dome. GSU plans to build a new baseball park on the stadium site, incorporating a preserved section of the former stadium wall marking the landing site of Hank Aaron's 715th career home run, then an MLB record.
- Men's and women's soccer: Compete at the GSU Soccer Field, a school owned off-campus facility located east of campus in Panthersville, Georgia.
- Men's and women's tennis: Compete at the Sharon Lester Tennis Center at Piedmont Park, a city owned park to the north of campus in the Midtown neighborhood
- Men's and women's golf: Compete at Eagles Landing Country Club, a 27-hole golf course in Stockbridge, Georgia.
- Beach volleyball: Compete at the 340-person capacity Sand Volleyball Complex, located behind the GSU Sports Arena

=== Facilities master plan ===
On May 7, 2014, Georgia State announced its intentions to purchase Turner Field and the surrounding parking lots after the Atlanta Braves announced that they would move to the new SunTrust Park in Cobb County, west of Atlanta. This would include re-purposing Turner Field into a 30,000 seat stadium that would house the Georgia State Football program as well as the school's soccer programs. It would also include rebuilding a baseball stadium in the footprint of the old Atlanta–Fulton County Stadium that was knocked down after the 1996 Summer Olympics. The plan would maintain the famous Hank Aaron wall that still stands in the Turner Field parking lot. The proposal would also include private dorms, public housing, shopping areas, and academic buildings.

On December 21, 2015, the Atlanta-Fulton County Recreation Authority announced that Georgia State's bid to redevelop Turner Field had been accepted. On August 18, 2016, Georgia State and the Recreation Authority reached a tentative purchase agreement for Turner Field, and the purchase and redevelopment plan was approved by the Board of Regents on November 9, 2016. On January 5, 2017, the sale of Turner Field, now renamed Center Parc Stadium, to Georgia State was officially closed, with the stadium conversion project beginning in February 2017. The first phase of construction for Center Parc Stadium was completed in time for Georgia State's 2017 season opener on August 31.

On January 31, 2018, Georgia State officially announced its intention to build a new Arena and Convocation Center that would host the school's basketball games. The arena will be built on land acquired from the city north of the Turner Field site that was converted into a football stadium for the football team.
