= Beth Van Fleet =

American beach volleyball player

Personal information
- Full name: Beth Van Fleet
- Nationality: United States
- Born: June 27, 1977 (age 49); Tampa, Florida, U.S.
- Hometown: San Diego, California, U.S.
- Height: 185 cm (6 ft 1 in)

Beach volleyball information

Current teammate
Years	Teammate
2009	Saralyn Smith
Medal record
Women's beach volleyball
Representing the United States
NORCECA Beach Volleyball Circuit
Silver medal – second place	2009 Guatemala	Beach
Bronze medal – third place	2009 Manzanillo	Beach

Beth Van Fleet (born June 27, 1977 in Tampa, Florida) is a female beach volleyball player from the United States who won the silver medal at the NORCECA Circuit 2009 at Guatemala playing with Saralyn Smith.

She also participated in the Association of Volleyball Professionals tournaments since 2003. There she ended up in the 9th position many times.

She played indoor volleyball in college with Georgia State where she received a marketing degree. With the Panthers she was two times "All Conference" Second Team and four times All Academic.

Van Fleet has served as the head coach for the Georgia State Panthers beach volleyball team since 2013. During her tenure at Georgia State she led the Sandy Panthers to 4 conference championships and 6 National Championship Tournament appearances. In the 2022 NCAA Tournament, Beth helped lead Georgia State to the largest upset in NCAA collegiate beach volleyball history when the #10 seeded Panthers defeated the #2 seeded TCU Horned Frogs in the second round. The victory pushed the Sandy Panthers all the way to the round of 6 and is the highest ranked win in Georgia State athletics history.

== Awards ==
=== College ===
- 1998, 1999 "All Conference" Second Team
- 1995–1999 All Conference "All Academic"

=== National team ===
- NORCECA Beach Volleyball Circuit Guatemala 2009 Silver Medal
- NORCECA Beach Volleyball Circuit Manzanillo 2009 Bronze Medal

=== AVP ===
- 2005 AVPNext National Championships Gold Medal

== Head coaching record ==
Record table
Season	Team	Overall	Conference	Standing	Postseason
Georgia State Panthers (Independent) (2013–2016)
2014	Georgia State	14–5			
2015	Georgia State	18–3			AVCA First Round
Georgia State Panthers (CCSA) (2016–2022)
2016	Georgia State	25–7	6–4	3rd	NCAA First Round
2017	Georgia State	21–14	6–5	7th	
2018	Georgia State	24–12	9–9	6th	
2019	Georgia State	24–12	8–9	3rd	
2020	Georgia State	10–3	3–2		
2021	Georgia State	23–13	8–9		
Georgia State Panthers (C-USA) (2022–2023)
2022	Georgia State	28–13	5–3	3rd	NCAA Final 6
Georgia State Panthers (Sun Belt) (2023–Present)
2023	Georgia State	20–17	4–0	1st	NCAA First Round
2024	Georgia State	26–13	9–0	1st	NCAA First Round
2025	Georgia State	22–16	7–1	2nd	NCAA First Round
Total:					
National champion Postseason invitational champion Conference regular season champion Conference regular season and conference tournament champion Division regular season champion Division regular season and conference tournament champion Conference tournament champion
