= North Florida Ospreys =

University of North Florida sport teams

- University: University of North Florida
- Nickname: Ospreys
- NCAA: Division I
- Conference: ASUN Conference (primary); CCSA (women's swimming & diving)
- Athletic director: Nick Morrow
- Location: Jacksonville, Florida
- Varsity teams: 18 (7 men's, 11 women's)
- Basketball arena: UNF Arena
- Baseball stadium: Harmon Stadium
- Softball stadium: UNF Softball Complex
- Soccer stadium: Hodges Stadium
- Aquatics center: UNF Competition Pool Complex
- Tennis venue: UNF Tennis Complex
- Other venues: The Cooper Beach Volleyball Complex; UNF Hayt Golf Center
- Colors: Navy blue and gray
- Mascot: Ozzie
- Fight song: UNF Fight Song
- Website: unfospreys.com
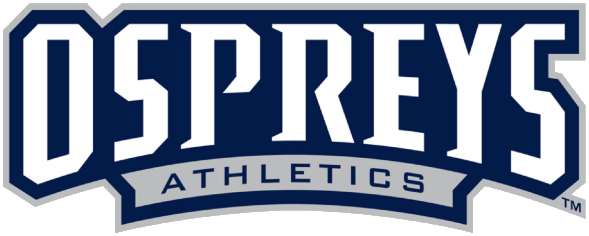

Team NCAA championships
- 1

The North Florida Ospreys are the athletic teams of the University of North Florida in Jacksonville, Florida. The Ospreys compete in the ASUN Conference in NCAA Division I. UNF became a full-fledged member of Division I in 2009; previously, the Ospreys were members of the Sunshine State Conference and Peach Belt Conference in NCAA Division II. UNF fields teams in seven men's sports and ten women's sports.

== History ==
The University of North Florida's intercollegiate athletics program began in 1983, originally as a member of the National Association of Intercollegiate Athletics (NAIA). The Ospreys joined NCAA Division II in 1993, the same year the UNF Arena opened. Initially, UNF competed in the Sunshine State Conference, and then in 1997 moved to the Peach Belt Conference. In 2005, the Ospreys began the transition to Division I, joining the Atlantic Sun Conference. The transition's final year was the 2008–09 season, with UNF becoming tournament eligible beginning in the 2009–10 season.

UNF is a non-football school. However, the prospect of an Osprey football team is a popular topic among students and the community. In 2013, UNF President John Delaney revealed the school would begin preliminary discussions about adding the sport.

UNF won the Sunshine State Conference's all-sports title four times and won four NAIA national titles—men's golf in 1991 and 1993, and women's tennis in 1986 and 1994. UNF's first Division I conference title came in 2008 when the men's golf team captured the Atlantic Sun crown.

In February 2009, UNF hired Lee Moon to be the new athletic director. He is UNF's sixth athletic director and previously worked at the University of Alabama at Birmingham, the University of Wyoming, and Marshall University. Since taking over UNF athletics, he has made many staff changes to move the program forward.

On July 16, 2014, UNF released updated logos and a custom font to represent the Ospreys across all sports.

=== Future ===
On September 2, 2008, the university announced plans for UNF Varsity Village. The project cost an estimated $30 million which provides two new facilities and upgrades to existing facilities. The two new facilities are a student wellness and sports education center, and a baseball stadium with a seating capacity of 3,000. The existing stadium, Harmon Stadium was renovated to include 1,200 seats and used for softball. Other improvements included upgrades to the Arena and Hodges Stadium.

== Conference affiliations ==
NCAA

- Sunshine State Conference (1992–1997)
- Peach Belt Conference (1997–2005)
- ASUN Conference (2005–present)

== Sports sponsored ==
Men's sports	Women's sports
Baseball	Basketball
Basketball	Beach volleyball
Cross country	Cross country
Golf	Golf
Soccer	Soccer
Tennis	Softball
Track and field^{1}	Swimming and diving
	Tennis
	Track and field^{1}
	Volleyball
^{1} – includes both indoor and outdoor

A member of the ASUN Conference (ASUN), the University of North Florida sponsors teams in eight men's and eleven women's NCAA sanctioned sports.

=== Baseball ===
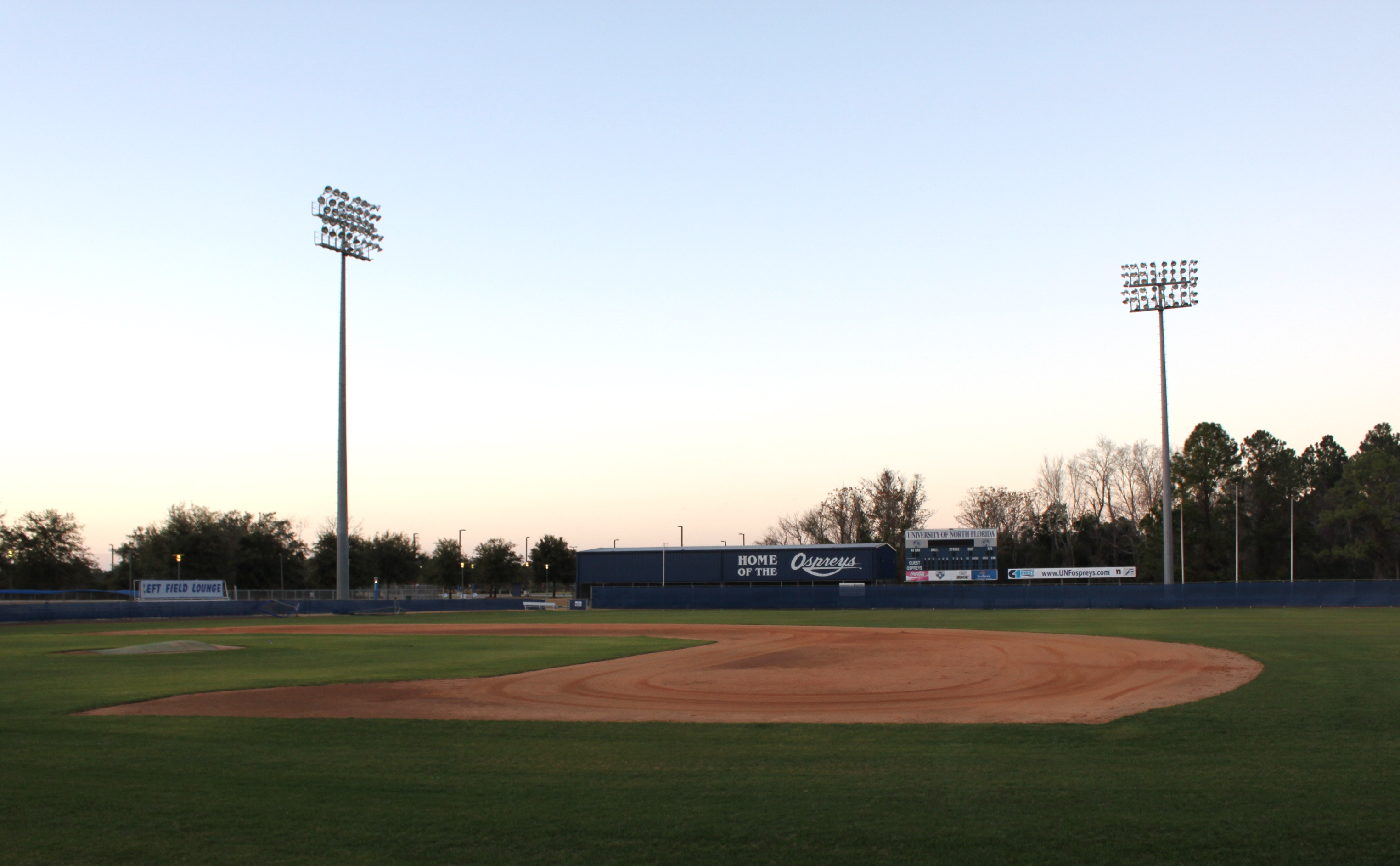
Harmon Stadium

North Florida's baseball program was founded in 1988. They play their home games at Dusty Rhodes Field at Harmon Stadium. The team was established under the leadership of Dusty Rhodes, who served as head coach from 1988 to 2010. Since its inception, the Ospreys baseball team has won thirteen conference titles: six in the NAIA, six in NCAA Division II, and one in NCAA Division I and has made a total of sixteen playoff appearances: six in the NAIA and ten in NCAA Division II. They went to the NAIA World Series in 1989 and 1991 and the NCAA Division II World Series in 2000, 2001, and 2005, advancing to the final in 2005.

The team's current head coach is Smoke Laval, who took over from Rhodes after the 2010 season. The Ospreys won their first Atlantic Sun regular season championship in 2015.

Notably, the team's former logo is similar to the New York Yankees logo. It was designed in 1986 at the urging of Dusty Rhodes and continued, and brought extra attention to the baseball program. It was discontinued after Rhodes' retirement in 2010 and replaced with a new logo for the 2011 season.

=== Men's basketball ===
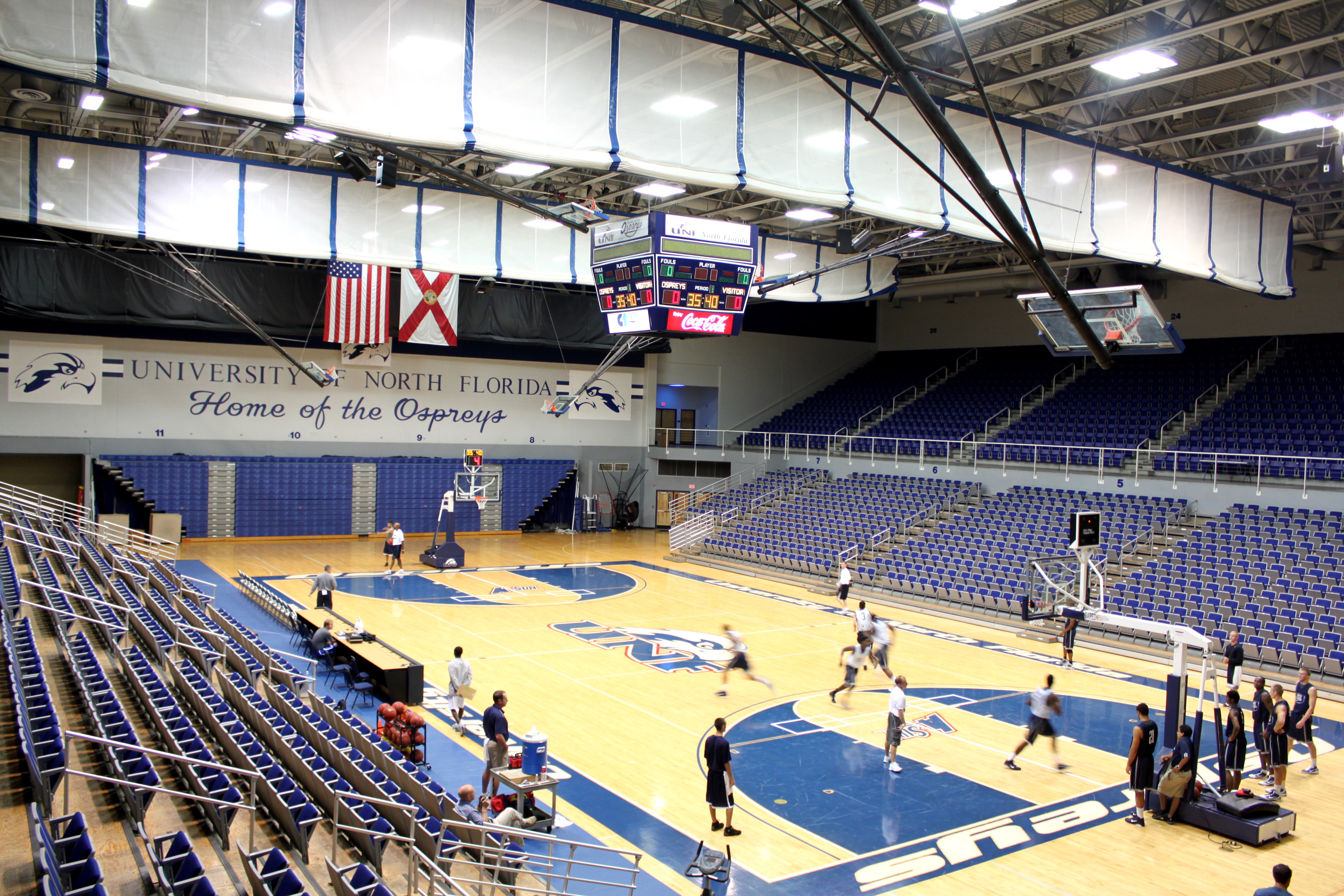
Men's basketball practice at UNF Arena

The North Florida Ospreys men's basketball team began play in the 1992–93 season as members of the NAIA. Matthew Driscoll is the current and fourth overall head coach of the men's basketball team. He was hired in 2009, just before UNF's completion of their transition into Division I play.

In the 2010–11 season, they advanced to the Atlantic Sun tournament championship game, where they were defeated by Belmont. The 2014–15 team won the program's first Atlantic Sun Conference regular season championship and Atlantic Sun Tournament title, earning them their first ever bid to the NCAA Division I men's basketball tournament.

The program's all-time record through the 2014–15 season is 268–403.

=== Women's basketball ===
The Ospreys women's basketball team is currently led by head coach Darrick Gibbs, who is in his first season in 2015–16. Mary Tappmeyer was the head coach from the program's inception in 1992 until 2015 when her contract was not renewed. North Florida made the NCAA Division II Tournament twice, in 2003 and 2004, and were the 2009–10 Atlantic Sun Conference runner-up. However, they began to struggle in the following years, posting two last-place finishes in the Atlantic Sun and a combined conference record of 4–28 over the 2013–14 and 2014–15 seasons.

=== Cross country ===
The men's cross country team has earned 4 conference titles in Division II, 3 of which came while UNF was in the Sunshine State Conference (1994–1996), and the fourth came in 2000 during their time in the Peach Belt Conference.

The women's cross country team has earned 5 conferences title in Division II, 3 in the Sunshine State Conference (1994–1996), and two in the Peach Belt Conference (2001, 2003). They won their first A-Sun conference title in 2010.

=== Men's golf ===
The men's golf team earned UNF's first Division I conference title in 2008. They added conference titles in 2012, 2013, 2015, 2018, 2019, and 2022. They use UNF's on-campus Hayt Golf Learning Center, which has a three-hole course and driving range.

Team honors:

- NAIA National titles (2): 1991, 1993
- NCAA Division II Regional appearances (5): 1999–2002, 2008
- NCAA Division II Championship appearances (1): 2000
- NCAA Division I Championship appearances (4): 2012, 2013, 2018, 2019

=== Men's soccer ===
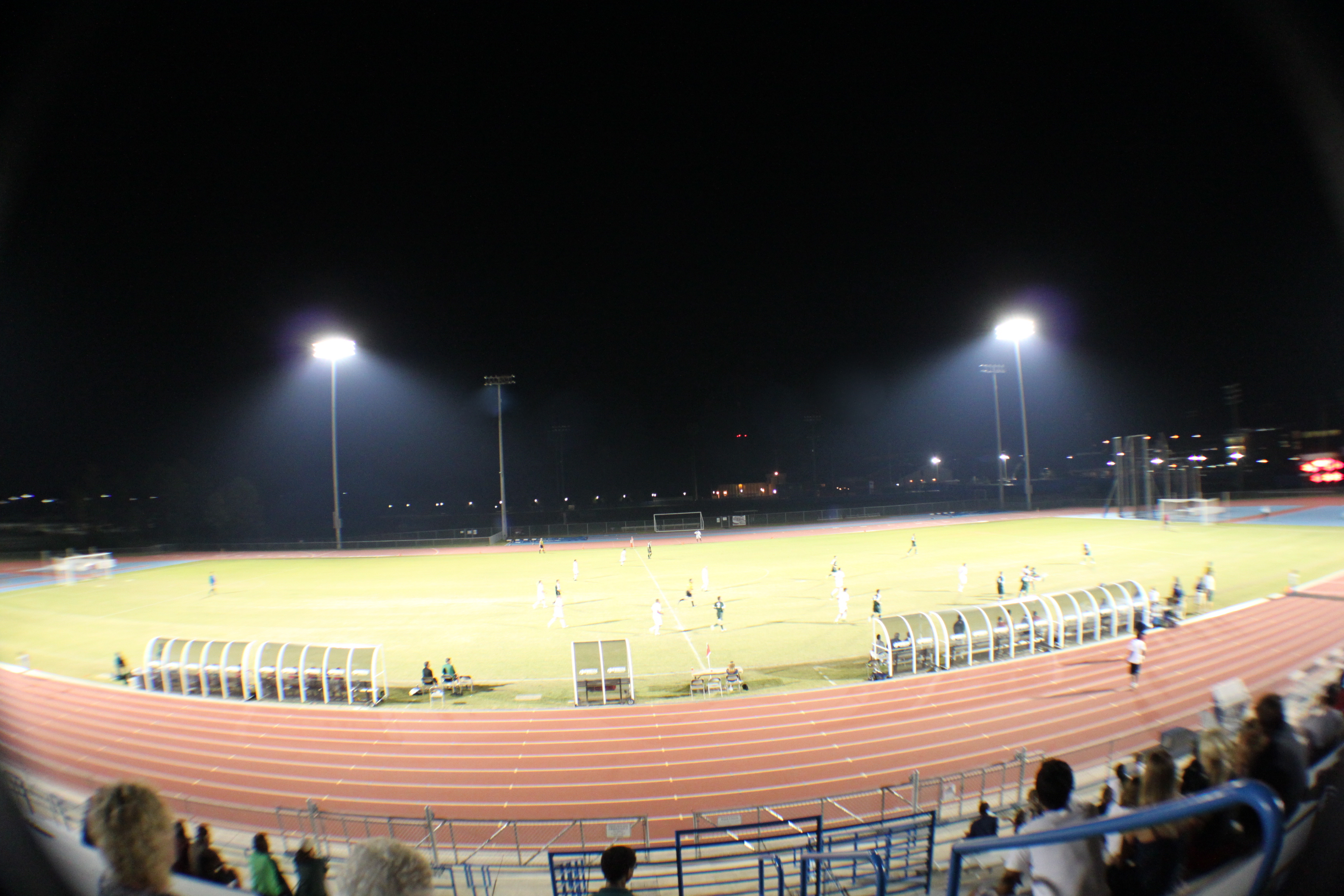
Soccer match at Hodges Stadium

North Florida soccer's home matches are held at Hodges Stadium. As of 2009, men's soccer's all-time record is 149–138 and the women's record is 151–88–15.

Men's soccer won their first Atlantic Sun Conference tournament title in 2015 by defeating USC Upstate 7–0 at Hodges Stadium. They earned their first bid to the NCAA Division I Men's Soccer Championship (College Cup) with a record of 10–6–1.

=== Softball ===
Osprey softball competes at home at the UNF Softball Complex, next to Harmon Stadium. They have a 619–24 all-time record as of 2009.

Team honors:
NCAA Division II Tournament Appearances (7): 1999–2005

=== Tennis ===
Tennis at UNF began in 1983, and the women's team has earned two national championships (1984–85 and 1993–94). Both men's and women's tennis has won seven conference championships each.

=== Volleyball ===
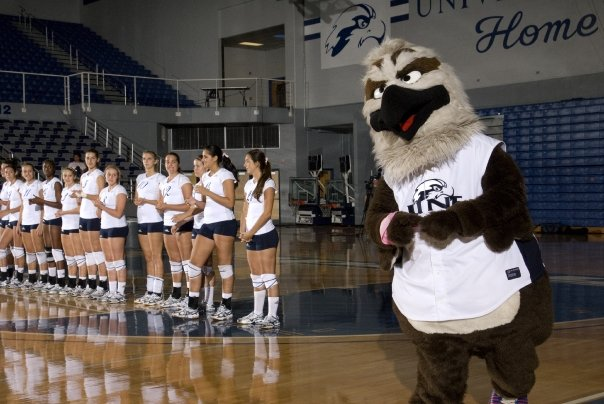
Volleyball team with Ozzie in UNF Arena

Women's volleyball at UNF began in 1991, and have an overall record of 401–178 (as of 2008). They play their home games at UNF Arena. They won eight Peach Belt Conference championships between 1997 and 2004. In the first year ever for UNF Women's Volleyball, the team progressed through the NAIA playoffs and qualified for the NAIA National Championship.

=== Other sports ===
UNF track and field hosted the 2009 Atlantic Sun Conference Championships at Hodges Stadium, the first Division I Conference Championship hosted at UNF.

The UNF women's golf team began play in 2012. A women's sand volleyball team was added in 2012; The current head coach is Samantha Dabbs.

Women's swimming and diving competes in the Coastal Collegiate Swimming Association.

== Traditions and rivalries ==
"The Swoop" is a key UNF tradition, similar in principle to UF's Gator Chomp or FSU's Tomahawk Chop as the recognized gesture to show school spirit. It simulates the movement of an Osprey flying through the "swooping" of a fan's arms. "Swoop" is also an acronym that stands for Students With Outstanding Osprey Pride.

Osprey basketball and baseball games can be heard on 1010 XL in Jacksonville. Most varsity sports can be watched on ESPN3.

=== River City Rumble ===
SunTrust River City Rumble logo

North Florida's most notable rivalry is with crosstown opponents the Jacksonville University Dolphins. The two universities contest the "River City Rumble", in which the school with the most wins over the other across all sports receives a trophy, the SunTrust Old Wooden Barrel. The teams are awarded one point for each victory throughout the season. In individual sports, the team that finishes higher at the Atlantic Sun Conference Championship earns one point. If the contest results in a tie, whichever team won the previous season retains the trophy.

Year	Winner
2005–06	JU, 11–9
2006–07	UNF, 11–9
2007–08	Tied, 10–10
2008–09	JU, 13–7
2009–10	JU, 11–9
2010–11	JU, 11–9
2011–12	UNF, 13–7
2012–13	UNF, 14.5–7.5
2013–14	Tied, 11–11
2014–15	UNF, 14–8
2015–16	JU, 12–10
2016–17	UNF, 12–10
2017–18	JU, 13–9
2018–19	UNF, 14–8
2019–20	UNF, 9–2
2020–21	UNF, 16–4
2021–22	UNF, 13–9
2022–23	Tied, 11–11
2023–24	UNF, 12.5–9.5
Years with barrel: UNF 13, JU 6

== National championships ==
=== Team ===
Sport	Association	Division	Year	Opponent/Runner-up	Score/Points
Women's tennis (2)	NAIA (1)	Single	1986	Arkansas–Little Rock; Texas–Tyler	30–29
Women's tennis (2)	NCAA (1)	Division II	1994	Cal Poly Pomona	6–0
