= Coastal Collegiate Sports Association =

NCAA Division I college athletic conference

- Formerly: Coastal Collegiate Swimming Association
- Association: NCAA
- Founded: 2008
- Folded: 2025
- Commissioner: Mike Hagen (since October 2015)
- Sports fielded: 1 (Beach Volleyball)
- Division: Division I
- No. of teams: 4
- Headquarters: Macon, Georgia
- Website: theccsa.com

Locations
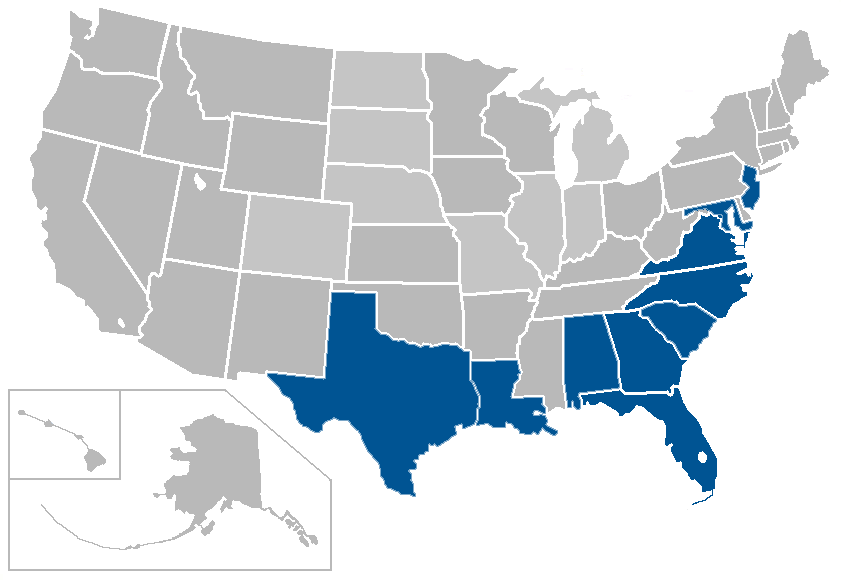

The Coastal Collegiate Sports Association was an NCAA Division I college athletic conference.

Established in 2008, the Coastal Collegiate Swimming Association (CCSA) was originally developed by four regional Division I conferences — the ASUN Conference, Big South Conference, Mid-Eastern Athletic Conference, and the Southern Conference — to create a centralized home for their members with swimming and diving programs.

In October 2015, the CCSA added the newly recognized NCAA sport of beach volleyball and rebranded itself the Coastal Collegiate Sports Association.

CCSA beach volleyball went through major changes in 2021. The CCSA entered into a beach volleyball partnership with Conference USA (C-USA) under which the 2021 CCSA championship in that sport was split into two groups, with the six full C-USA and Sun Belt Conference members playing in one group. Following the 2021 championship, those six schools—C-USA members Florida Atlantic, FIU, Southern Miss, and UAB, plus Sun Belt members Georgia State and Louisiana–Monroe (ULM)—formed a new C-USA beach volleyball league, with another Sun Belt member, Coastal Carolina, joining them. At the same time, Charleston and UNC Wilmington (UNCW) left CCSA beach volleyball for the ASUN.

In August 2023, ASUN began sponsoring men's and women's swimming and diving fully absorbing the entirety of the CCSA swimming and diving members, and SMU from The American, leaving the four beach volleyball members as the only remaining members of the conference. In February 2025, the remaining members of the CCSA announced they would all move their respective beach volleyball programs to the Mountain Pacific Sports Federation beginning in the 2026 season (2025-26 academic year), effectively bringing an end to the CCSA after 17 seasons.

At the time of its dissolution, the CCSA had 4 member schools, representing four states (Florida, Louisiana, South Carolina, and Texas).

== Members ==
All four remaining members were beach volleyball members.

=== Final members ===
School	Nickname	Joined	Primary Conference	CCSA Sport Conference
Florida State University	Seminoles	2015	ACC	Big 12
Louisiana State University	Tigers	2015	SEC	MPSF
University of South Carolina	Gamecocks	2015	SEC	Big 12
University of Texas at Austin	Longhorns	2024	SEC	MPSF

=== Former members ===
School	Nickname	Joined	Left	Sport	Primary Conference	CCSA Sport Conference
Bellarmine University	Knights	2020	2023	Swimming & diving (M / W)	ASUN	
Campbell University	Camels	2008	2023	Swimming & diving (W)	CAA	
College of Charleston	Cougars	2008	2013	Swimming & diving (M / W)	CAA	None (Note: Charleston's Men's and women's swimming joined the CAA after the 2012-13 season before the sport was dropped after the 2014-15 season.)
College of Charleston	Cougars	2016	2021	Beach volleyball	CAA	Sun Belt
Davidson College	Wildcats	2008	2014	Swimming & diving (M / W)	A-10	
Florida A&M University	Rattlers	2008	2011	Swimming & diving (M / W)	SWAC	None (Note: Florida A&M's men's and women's swimming was dropped after the 2010-11 season.)
Florida Atlantic University	Owls	2015	2021	Beach volleyball	American	C-USA
Florida Atlantic University	Owls	2015	2023	Swimming & diving (M)	American	ASUN
Florida Gulf Coast University	Eagles	2008	2023	Swimming & diving (W)	ASUN	
Florida International University (FIU)	Panthers	2015	2021	Beach volleyball	Conference USA	
Gardner–Webb University	Runnin' Bulldogs	2008	2023	Swimming & diving (M / W)	Big South	ASUN
Georgia Southern University	Eagles	2008	2023	Swimming & diving (W)	Sun Belt	
Georgia State University	Panthers	2015	2021	Beach volleyball	Sun Belt	
Grand Canyon University	Antelopes	2022	2024	Beach volleyball	WAC	MPSF
Howard University	Bison	2008	2020	Swimming & diving (M / W)	MEAC	NEC
University of the Incarnate Word	Cardinals	2013	2022	Swimming & diving (M / W)	Southland	MPSF
James Madison University	Dukes	2022	2023	Swimming & diving (W)	Sun Belt	
Liberty University	Lady Flames	2011	2023	Swimming & diving (W)	C-USA	ASUN
University of Louisiana at Monroe	Warhawks	2019	2021	Beach volleyball	Sun Belt	
Missouri State University	Lady Bears	2019	2023	Beach volleyball	MVC	C-USA
Mount St. Mary's University	The Mount	2017	2020	Swimming & diving (M)	NEC	
New Jersey Institute of Technology (NJIT)	Highlanders	2013	2020	Swimming & diving (M)	AmEast	
North Carolina A&T State University	Aggies	2008	2016	Swimming & diving (W)	CAA	None (Note: North Carolina A&T's women's swimming was dropped after the 2015-16 season.)
University of North Carolina at Asheville	Bulldogs	2012	2023	Swimming & diving (W)	Big South	ASUN
University of North Florida	Ospreys	2008	2023	Swimming & diving (W)	ASUN	
Old Dominion University	Monarchs	2015	2023	Swimming & diving (M)	Sun Belt	ASUN
Old Dominion University	Monarchs	2022	2023	Swimming & diving (W)	Sun Belt	
Queens University of Charlotte	Royals	2022	2023	Swimming & diving (M / W)	ASUN	
Radford University	Highlanders	2008	2014	Swimming & diving (W)	Big South	None (Note: Radford's women's swimming was dropped after the 2013-14 season.)
University of Southern Mississippi (Southern Miss)	Golden Eagles	2018	2021	Beach volleyball	Sun Belt	
Texas Christian University (TCU)	Horned Frogs	2018	2023	Beach volleyball	Big 12	
Tulane University	Green Wave	2015	2022	Beach volleyball	American	C-USA
University of Alabama at Birmingham (UAB)	Blazers	2015	2021	Beach volleyball	American	C-USA
University of Maryland, Baltimore County (UMBC)	Retrievers	2013	2017	Swimming & diving (M)	AmEast	
University of North Carolina Wilmington (UNCW)	Seahawks	2016	2021	Beach volleyball	CAA	Sun Belt
Virginia Military Institute (VMI)	Keydets	2008	2017	Swimming & diving (M / W)	SoCon	AmEast

=== Membership timeline ===
Men's & Women's Swimming Beach Volleyball Women's Swimming Men's Swimming Men's Swimming & Beach Volleyball

== Swimming & Diving Champions ==
Year	Men's Champion	Women's Champion	Site
2008	College of Charleston	Davidson	Huntersville Family Fitness & Aquatics • Huntersville, NC
2009	College of Charleston	Florida Gulf Coast	Gabrielsen Natatorium • Athens, GA
2010	Davidson	Florida Gulf Coast	Allan Jones Intercollegiate Aquatic Center • Knoxville, TN
2011	Davidson	Florida Gulf Coast	Gabrielsen Natatorium • Athens, GA
2012	Davidson	Florida Gulf Coast	Gabrielsen Natatorium • Athens, GA
2013	Davidson	Florida Gulf Coast	Gabrielsen Natatorium • Athens, GA
2014	Incarnate Word	Liberty	Allan Jones Natatorium • Knoxville, TN
2015	UMBC	Florida Gulf Coast	Gabrielsen Natatorium • Athens, GA
2016	UMBC	Florida Gulf Coast	Gabrielsen Natatorium • Athens, GA
2017	UMBC	Florida Gulf Coast	Gabrielsen Natatorium • Athens, GA
2018	Incarnate Word	Florida Gulf Coast	Gabrielsen Natatorium • Athens, GA
2019	Incarnate Word	Liberty	Liberty Natatorium • Lynchburg, VA
2020	Incarnate Word	Liberty	Allan Jones Intercollegiate Aquatic Center • Knoxville, TN
2021	Gardner-Webb	Liberty	Liberty Natatorium • Lynchburg, VA
2022	Incarnate Word	Liberty	Liberty Natatorium • Lynchburg, VA

== Beach Volleyball Champions ==
Year	Regular season Champion (Record)	Tournament Champion	Tournament Runner-up	Tournament Site	Teams to NCAA Tournament
2016	Florida State (7–0)	Florida State	Georgia State	LakePoint Sporting Community • Emerson, GA	Florida State; Georgia State
2017	Florida State (8–0)	Florida State	FIU	LakePoint Sporting Community • Emerson, GA	Florida State; LSU; South Carolina
2018	Florida State (10–0)	Florida State	LSU	LakePoint Sporting Community • Emerson, GA	Florida State; FIU; LSU; South Carolina
2019	Florida State (13–1)	Florida State	LSU	LakePoint Sporting Community • Emerson, GA	Florida State; LSU
2020	No championship held due to the COVID-19 pandemic				
2021	Florida State (17–1)	Florida State (Aqua Bracket); FAU (Blue Bracket)	LSU (Aqua Bracket); Georgia State (Blue Bracket)	John Hunt Sand Volleyball Complex • Huntsville, AL	Florida State; LSU; TCU
2022	TCU (7–1)	Florida State	TCU	John Hunt Sand Volleyball Complex • Huntsville, AL	Florida State; LSU; TCU
