= List of University of Puget Sound alumni =

The University of Puget Sound is a private liberal arts college in Tacoma, Washington. Following is a list of its notable alumni.

== Art and architecture ==
Name	Class	Notability	References
Dale Chihuly	Non-degreed	Glass artist	

== Business ==
Name	Class	Notability	References
Nicolas Cary	2007	Co-founder of Blockchain.com	
Alex Israel		Businessman, founder of ParkMe and Metropolis Technologies	
Erik Voorhees	2007	Cryptocurrency entrepreneur	

== Clergy ==
Name	Class	Notability	References
Ray Ortlund	Non-degreed	Evangelical speaker, Presbyterian minister, and author who cofounded Renewal Ministries	

== Education ==
Name	Class	Notability	References
Suzanne Anderson	1979	Professor of Geophysics at the University of Colorado Boulder	
Robert Lee Barker	1959	Professor of social work and author of The Social Work Dictionary	
Janet Beery	1983	Historian of mathematics, professor of mathematics and computer science at the University of Redlands	
Jessica N. Berry	1994	Philosopher and professor of philosophy at Georgia State University	
Terry Castle	1975	Professor of English at Stanford University	
Gary Hansen	1980	Macroeconomist at the University of California, Los Angeles	
Robert Huey	1973	Professor of Japanese Literature at the University of Hawaii at Manoa	
Christine Kelley	1999	Aaron Douglas Professor of Mathematics at University of Nebraska - Lincoln	
John Chester Miller		Professor of history at Bryn Mawr College and at Stanford University	
Rebecca Ann Parker	1975	President of Starr King School for the Ministry, theologian, and author	
Jeffrey T. Parsons	1988	Distinguished Professor of Psychology at Hunter College and The Graduate Center of the City University of New York (CUNY)	
Sara B. Pritchard		Associate professor of science and technology studies at Cornell University	
Melissa Thomasson	1992	Julian Lange Professor of Economics at Miami University	
Bang Wong	1994	Creative director of the Broad Institute at MIT and Harvard University	
Zelda Zabinsky		Professor of industrial engineering at the University of Washington	

== Entertainment ==
Name	Class	Notability	References
Kiʻilani Arruda	2025	Miss Teen USA 2020	
Jori Chisholm	1997	Champion bagpiper	
Katie Harman	Non-degreed	Classical vocalist and actress who won the Miss America 2002 and Miss Oregon 2001 pageants	
Bayard Johnson		Screenwriter (The Second Jungle Book: Mowgli & Baloo, Tarzan and the Lost City)	
Erik Scott Kimerer		Voice actor and professional wrestler under the name "Sassy Assassin"	
Irshad Manji	Honorary 2008	Emmy Award-nominated film producer, journalist, and television presenter	
Rachel Martin	1996	Host of NPR's Weekend Edition Sunday	
Chris Pirih		Creator of SkiFree, one of the seminal computer games in the early days of Microsoft Windows	
Roald Reitan		Metropolitan Opera star	
Casey Sander		Actor	
Ross Shafer	1975	Comedian and motivational speaker	
Jeff Smith	1967	TV chef, The Frugal Gourmet	
Hari Sreenivasan	1995	Correspondent for the NewsHour with Jim Lehrer	
Darby Stanchfield	1993	Actress known for Mad Men and Scandal	
Rick Steves	Non-degreed	Producer and presenter of Rick Steve's Europe on PBS and author of Rick Steves' tour guidebook series	
Adam West	Non-degreed	Actor, most notably portraying Batman; transferred to Whitman College	

== Law ==
Name	Class	Notability	References
Charles W. Johnson	JD, 1976	Associate Chief Justice of the Washington State Supreme Court	
Frank Prewitt		Attorney and government affairs consultant.	
Christine Quinn-Brintnall	JD, 1980	Washington state Court of Appeals judge	
Hugh J. Rosellini	Non-degreed	Chief justice of the Washington Supreme Court	
Nicole Shanahan	BA, 2007	Silicon Valley-based attorney, independent candidate for vice president in 2024	

== Military ==
Name	Class	Notability	References
Burton C. Andrus		U.S. Army officer who was the commandant of the Nuremberg Prison	
Jose Calugas	1961	Medal of Honor recipient	
Roosevelt Mercer Jr.	1975	Retired United States Air Force major general	

== Politics ==
Name	Class	Notability	References
Bill Baarsma	1964	Mayor of Tacoma, 2002–2009	
Ramona Bennett		Puyallup leader and activist	
Gwendalyn F. Cody		Member of the Virginia House of Delegates	
Dennis Flannigan	Non-degreed	Washington House of Representatives	
Rosa Franklin		Washington State Senate	
Tom Huff		Washington House of Representatives	
Daniel Nguyen		Businessman and member of the Oregon House of Representatives	
Rochelle Nguyen		Attorney and member of the Nevada Assembly	
T'wina Nobles		Educator and member of the Washington State Senate	
George Obiozor	1969	Nigerian ambassador to the U.S.	
Sean Parnell	JD; 1987	Governor of Alaska	
Debbie Regala		Former member of the Washington State Legislature	
Brian Sonntag	Non-degreed	Washington State Auditor	
Thomas A. Swayze Jr.		Washington House of Representatives	
Bob Tiernan		Former member of the Oregon House of Representatives	
Max Vekich		Former member of the Washington House of Representatives and commissioner of the Federal Maritime Commission	
Hal Wolf		Washington House of Representatives	

== Science and medicine ==
Name	Class	Notability	References
William Canfield	1976; 2008	Glycobiologist who developed an enzyme that can stabilize Pompe disease	
Helen Engle (née Harris)		Conservationist and activist	
Edward LaChapelle	1949	Avalanche researcher and glaciologist	
Richard Stolarski	1963	Atmospheric scientist who played a critical role in discovery of the ozone hole	

== Sports ==
Name	Class	Notability	References
Kai Correa		Major League Baseball coach for the San Francisco Giants	
Craig Driver		Professional and college baseball coach	
Gretchen Fraser	1941	Gold medalist in the slalom at 1948 Winter Olympics	
Grady Fuson		Professional baseball scout and executive, special adviser for the Oakland Athletics of Major League Baseball	
Erik Scott Kimerer		Professional wrestler under the name 'Sassy Assassin' and voice actor	
Charles Lappenbusch	Non-degreed	Athlete and sports coach at Western Washington University	
Charlie Lowery		Professional basketball player	
Judy MacLeod		Commissioner of Conference USA intercollegiate athletic conference	
Mike Oliphant	1988	Professional (NFL) football player	
Mike Price	1969	Head football coach at Washington State University and the University of Texas at El Paso	
Lael Wilcox	2008	Ultra-distance cyclist who won the Trans Am Bike Race	
Milt Woodard	1933	Sports executive, co-founder of American Football League	

== Other ==
Name	Class	Notability	References
Ted Bundy	Non-degreed	Serial killer	
Marion Higgins	1897	Supercentenarian who died at age 112 and was briefly the oldest California resident	
