= Meadowdale High School (Washington) =

Coordinates: 47°50′43″N 122°18′49″W

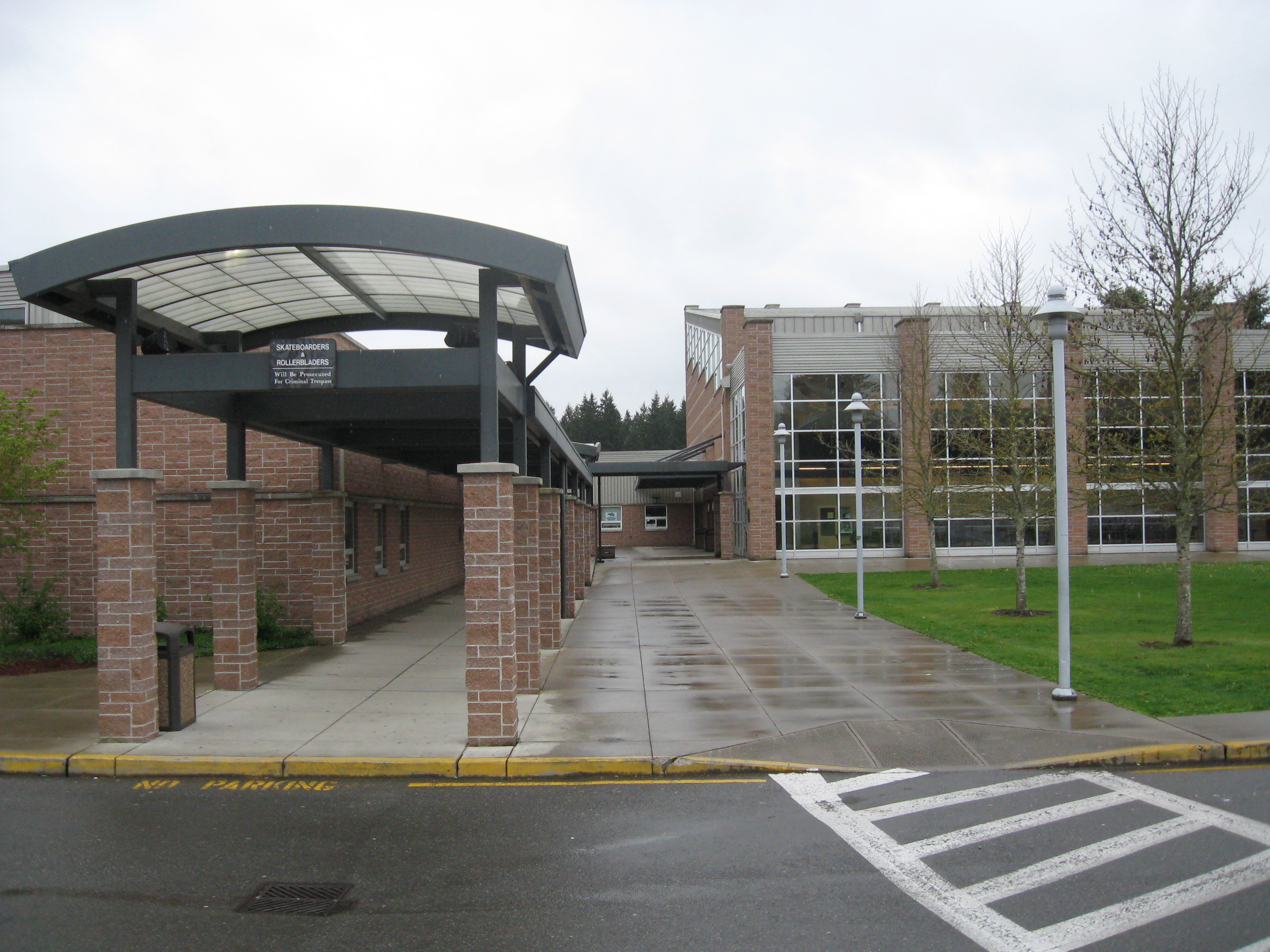

Location
- 6002 168th St SW; Lynnwood, Snohomish, Washington 98037; United States

Information
- Type: Public
- Motto: "Give us light, so we can fight"
- Established: 1963; Rebuilt 1997-1998
- School district: Edmonds School District
- Principal: Kim Whitworth
- Teaching staff: 67.95 (FTE)
- Enrollment: 1,535 (2023-2024)
- Student to teacher ratio: 22.59
- Campus: Suburban
- Colors: Navy, Columbia Blue, White & Gray
- Mascot: Mavericks
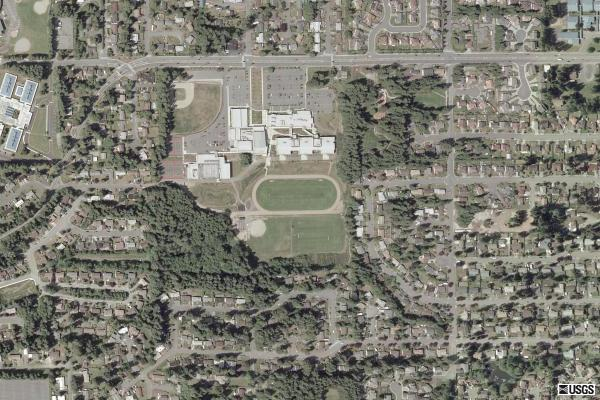
- Aerial photograph of Meadowdale High School

Meadowdale High School is a high school in the Edmonds School District, located in Lynnwood, Washington, United States. The school has students in grades 9 through 12. Meadowdale competes 3A in the Washington Interscholastic Athletic Association after two years as 4A between 2004-2006. The school's mascot is the Maverick, though prior to 2000 it was the "Chiefs". 1997-1998 were the years of the school's last major renovations.

The school's schedule is based on a 100-minute, 3-period block schedule, consisting of 1st, 3rd, and 5th periods on Monday and Wednesday and 2nd, 4th, and 6th periods on Tuesday and Thursday. On Friday, students go to all six classes for roughly 50 minutes each.

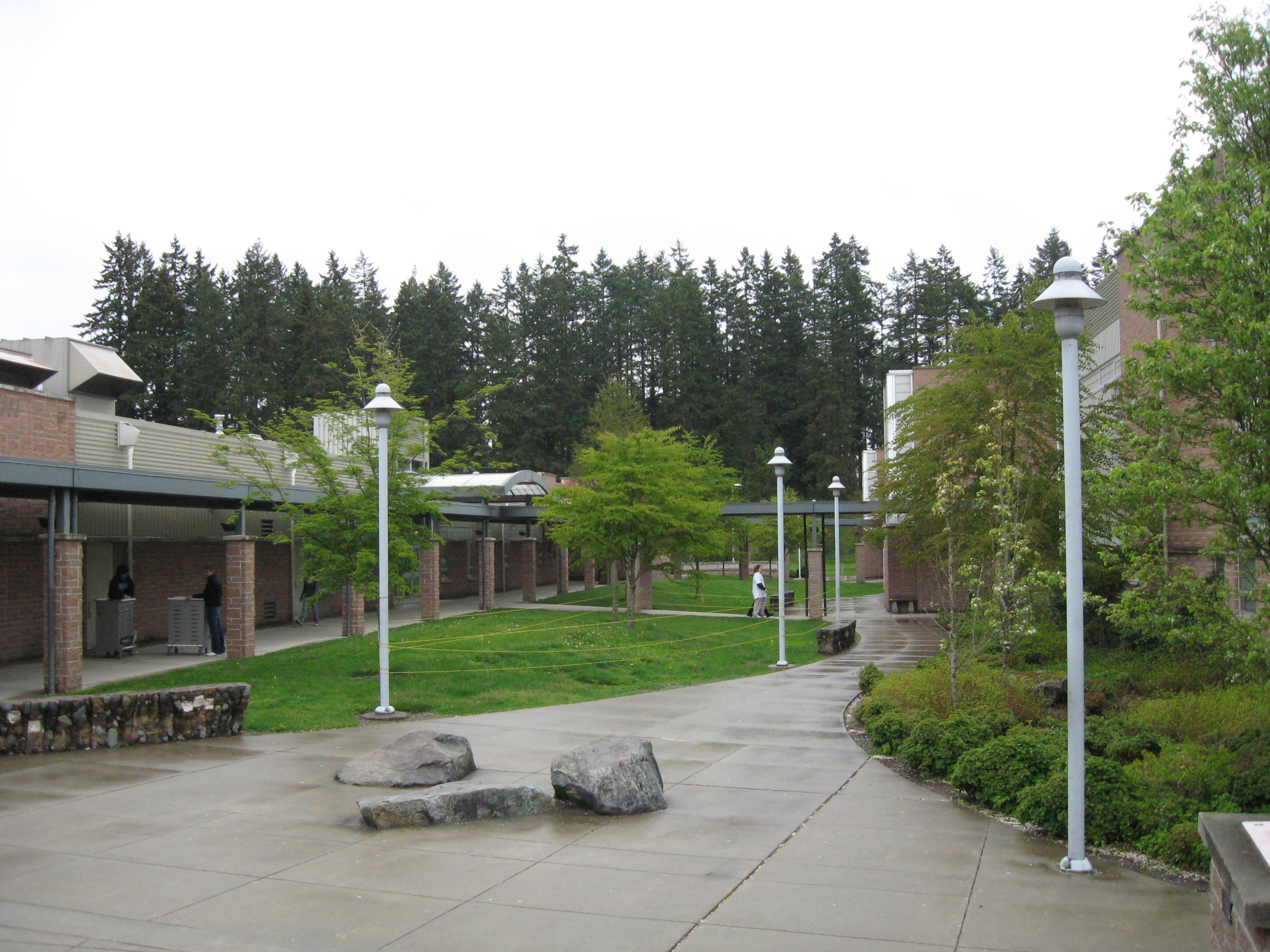
The main corridor of Meadowdale. The library and the C unit are visible on the left, and Commencement Hall (housing the D, E, and F units where most classes take place) is visible on the right.

== Athletics ==
Meadowdale supports a variety of sports teams, playing in the Wesco South 3A league.

=== Football ===
Meadowdale finished the 2007 season with a 7-5 record, making it to the state quarterfinals for the first time since 1959 before losing to O'Dea High School.

In 2009 the Mavericks finished the regular season undefeated at 11-0. The Mavericks beat Renton and Columbia River advancing to the state quarterfinals again. The Mavericks lost to Union High School 49-7.

In 2016, the Mavericks finished 3rd in state—the furthest they have gone in school history. Their starting quarterback led the team to the state semifinals and received attention from multiple Division 2 schools. One of their Tight ends received 10 touchdowns and signed his Letter of intent to play football at the University of Alabama.

=== Soccer ===
In 2004, the boys' soccer team won the 3A state title, beating Mt. Rainier 2-3 in extra time. The girls' soccer team made it to the 3A state competition in 2007 for the first time in six years but lost to Kennedy of Burien 0-0 in the first-round game. Meadowdale's 2012 girls' soccer team is currently #1 in Washington State with a record of 10-0-0 as of October 11, 2012.

The 1981 Meadowdale High girls soccer team was the first Snohomish County Class school to win a Washington state high school soccer championship, in fact, this championship match was the first ever Washington state soccer championship playoff for girls. This team placed third in its Class 4A Wesco league and was not expected to win the state title. But they did by beating the Hazen Highlanders 3-2 in a shootout in weather that was very rainy and windy. Roger Bray, an elementary school teacher, was the head coach and two of his daughters, Gayle and Leslie, were members of the team.

=== Basketball ===
Meadowdale enjoys successful boys' and girls' basketball programs. Gary Morgan holds the most points in a game with 38 in 1974, most rebounds in a game is 22 by Brad Victor in 1991. During the late 1990s and through the entire 2000's, both programs were a dominating presence in WESCO and a staple at the state tournament. The girls have two 3A state titles to their credit, winning in 2000 and 2004, as well as being runners up in 1994 and 1999. Three of the state championship appearances came under head coach Karen Blair, with the first in 1994 being under Vance Spangler. Blair was inducted into the Snohomish County Sports Hall of Fame in 2013. Before never making the state tournament in program history, the Lady Chiefs/Mavs made the state tournament 16 times in a 17-year span (from 92-93 until 08-09), and placed at state (top 8) 13 times. They have not returned to state since 2009.

The boys' basketball team went to state for the first time in 1978, and did not return again until the 2002-03 season. From 2002-2011 the Mavs made 5 state tournament appearances, including 3 trips to the semifinals. Despite a first round loss to #1 ranked Enumclaw in 2010, Meadowdale placed 5th at state, the highest in program history, and have not returned to the tournament since.

Meadowdale has a feeder program that develops 5th through 8th grade basketball players who will eventually attend the high school. The program describes itself as teaching the "Meadowdale Way" to boys and girls long before they reach high school.

=== Wrestling ===
When the Mavericks were known as the Chiefs, they won 3 individual state titles and also had a 6th-place finisher on their way to a team state title in the 83-84 season. The Chiefs returned a strong team from the year prior and had 2 repeat individual state champions, a 3rd-place finisher, a 4th-place finisher and a 5th-place finisher to capture a back to back team state championship in the 84-85 season. In 2013 they had a first place state champion and a fourth-place finisher.

=== Baseball ===
The baseball team at MHS has had its fair share of success. In 1980, under coach Ron Martin, the Chiefs defeated Shadle Park HS 8-4 for the school's first baseball state title. 11 years later (1991) they added a second state championship with a 2-0 victory over Hanford. Meadowdale first appeared on the state tournament stage in 1974 and have made 16 trips to date.

=== Cheerleading ===
Currently competing in the 3A Non-Tumbling division, the Meadowdale Cheerleading Squad has taken home State Champion titles at the WIAA Cheerleading State Championships in 2005, 2010, 2013, 2014 and 2016. They have previously competed in Co-ed and Tumbling divisions.

== Notable alumni ==
- Tom McGrath - American voice actor, animator, screenwriter, and film director. He is known for directing all three Madagascar movies as well as Megamind and both Boss Baby movies.
- Steven W Bailey - American actor from My Big Fat Obnoxious Fiance and as Joe the Bartender on Grey's Anatomy
- Connor Hamlett - NFL player
- Judy MacLeod (Class of 1982) - Sports administrator and current Commissioner of Conference USA
- Patrick Marleau - NHL Player and all-time leading scorer for the San Jose Sharks
- Kristen O'Neill - WNBA Player
- Nick Mcmahan, Brent McGaughey, Harry MacDonald - members of rock band Girl On Fire
- Randy Roth (Class of 1973) - convicted murderer
- Layne Staley - lead singer and co-lyricist of Alice in Chains and Mad Season
- Brendan Witt - NHL Player Washington Capitals, Nashville Predators and New York Islanders
