= Paul Bryant =

Paul Bryant may refer to:

- Bear Bryant (1913–1983), American football coach
- Cubby Bryant (born 1971), American radio personality
- Paul W. Bryant Jr. (born c. 1945), American banker, investor and philanthropist

== See also ==
- Paul Bryan (disambiguation)
- Paul Bryant Bridge, Tuscaloosa, Alabama
