= Żabiński =

Żabiński or Zabinsky (feminine Żabińska) is a Polish surname. Notable people with this name include:

- Antonina Żabińska (1908–1971), writer who sheltered hundreds of Jews in the Holocaust, married to Jan
- Jan Żabiński (1897–1974), zookeeper who sheltered hundreds of Jews in the Holocaust, married to Antonina
- Józef Żabiński (1860–1928), Polish chess player
- Zelda Zabinsky, American industrial engineer
