= Connor Hamlett =

American football player (born 1992)

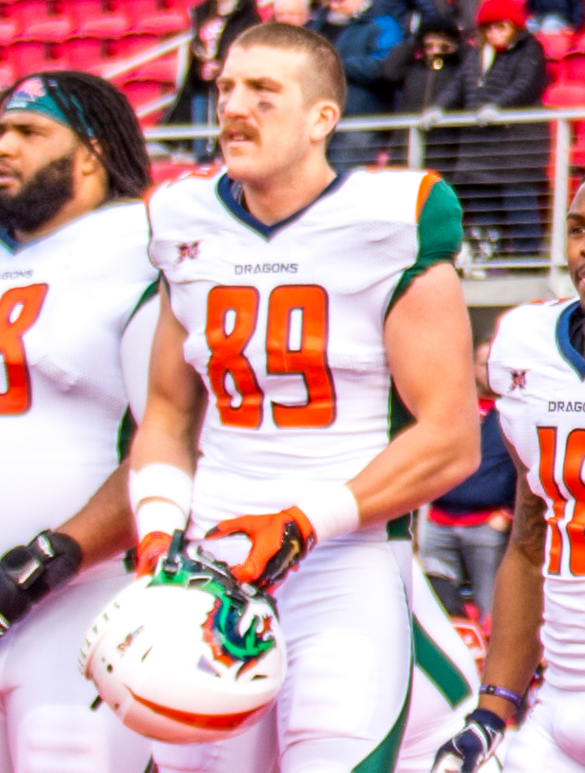
- Hamlett with the Seattle Dragons in 2020

No. 89
- Position: Tight end

Personal information
- Born: April 12, 1992 (age 34); Riverside, California, U.S.
- Listed height: 6 ft 7 in (2.01 m)
- Listed weight: 259 lb (117 kg)

Career information
- High school: Meadowdale (Lynnwood, Washington)
- College: Oregon State (2010–2014)
- NFL draft: 2015: undrafted

Career history
- Jacksonville Jaguars (2015)*; Philadelphia Eagles (2015)*; New Orleans Saints (2015)*; Cleveland Browns (2015–2016); Dallas Cowboys (2017)*; Arizona Hotshots (2019); Seattle Dragons (2020)
- * Offseason or practice squad member only

Career NFL statistics
- Receptions: 1
- Receiving yards: 17
- Receiving touchdowns: 1
- Stats at Pro Football Reference

Connor Hamlett (born April 12, 1992) is an American former professional football player who was a tight end for the Cleveland Browns of the National Football League (NFL). He lettered in football, basketball and track at Meadowdale High School in Lynnwood, Washington, where he earned All-State honors in football his senior year. He played college football for the Oregon State Beavers, recording career totals of 104 receptions for 1,109 yards and 10 touchdowns. He finished third in school history in receptions for a tight end and fifth in receiving yards for a tight end. He was named Pac-12 All-Academic second-team his junior season in 2013 and Pac-12 All-Academic first-team his senior season in 2014. Hamlett signed with the Jacksonville Jaguars after going undrafted in the 2015 NFL draft, but was waived before the start of the 2015 season. He then had short stints on the practice squad of the Philadelphia Eagles and New Orleans Saints before being signed to the Browns' practice squad in December 2015. He played in three games, starting two, for the Browns in 2016, and caught one pass for a 17-yard touchdown. Hamlett was also a preseason member of the Dallas Cowboys in 2017 but suffered an injury and was released before the start of the 2017 season. He later played for the Arizona Hotshots of the Alliance of American Football in 2019 and the Seattle Dragons of the XFL in 2020.

== Early life ==
Hamlett was a three-year letterman in football at Meadowdale High School in Lynnwood, Washington as a tight end. He earned second-team All-WesCo League 3A honors his junior season. He recorded 43 receptions for 648 yards and six touchdowns his senior year, earning second-team All-State, Associated Press Class 3A honorable mention All-State, and first-team All-WesCo League 3A honors. He also played defensive end his senior year, which was his first year playing on the defensive line. Meadowdale High finished with an 11–1 record his senior year; winning the first 11 games before losing in the Class 3A state quarterfinals. He was selected to participate in the 2010 Class 3A/4A East–West All-Star Football Game as part of the West Team but chose not to play in the game. In addition to lining up at the normal tight end spot, Hamlett was also used split out wide at the wide receiver spot while at Meadowdale.

He was also a three-year letterman in basketball. He earned second-team All-WesCo South honors his junior year in 2008–09 as Meadowdale won a share of the WesCo South title, won the 3A District 1 title and also finished sixth in the Class 3A state tournament. He was team co-captain his senior year and garnered first-team All-WesCo South accolades after averaging 19 points and 10 rebounds. In the 2010 Class 3A state boys basketball tournament, Hamlett averaged 24 points and 10 rebounds per game and earned first-team All-Tournament honors as Meadowdale High finished in fifth place. The team also finished second in the 3A District 1 tournament and second in the WesCo South. He was named The Herald's 2010 All-Area Boys Basketball Player of the Year.

He earned two letters in track as well. He graduated from Meadowdale High School in 2010.

In the class of 2010, Hamlett was rated a two-star football recruit by Rivals.com, Scout.com and ESPN.com. He was also rated the No. 99 tight end in the country by Scout.com, and the No. 50 tight end in the country by ESPN.com. He was also rated both a three-star recruit and the No. 83 tight end in the country on 247Sports.com's composite rating, which takes into account the ratings of all the other major recruiting services in the country. In February 2009, Scout.com released its 2010 Northwest Fab 50 ranking, which rated the top 50 football players in the Northwest graduating in 2010. Hamlett was rated No. 33 and listed as a wide receiver.

He committed to Oregon State in February 2010. He also received an offer from Washington State. When Hamlett committed to Oregon State in February, the team offered him a grayshirt, which he accepted. In March, it was reported that Hamlett was not grayshirting as originally planned and was instead walking-on in 2010 and going on scholarship after the season. However, in August 2010, it was reported he had been given a scholarship.

Hamlett's brother, Casey, played football at Western Washington from 2007 to 2008 and at Washington State from 2009 to 2010.

== College career ==
Hamlett played as a tight end for the Oregon State Beavers of Oregon State University from 2011 to 2014. In 2010, he was redshirted and shared the offensive scout MVP award with Tyler Anderson. He majored in business management at Oregon State.

He played in 11 games in 2011 and earned Pac-12 All-Academic Honorable Mention honors. He appeared in 13 games, starting 7, in 2012. He caught 32 passes for 403 yards and 3 touchdowns. He also earned Pac-12 All-Academic Honorable Mention honors for the second straight year.

Hamlett played in 11 games, starting 10, in 2013. He caught 40 passes for 364 yards and 5 touchdowns. He garnered All-Pac-12 Honorable Mention honors and Pac-12 All-Academic second-team honors. He missed two games due to knee problems. He had three minor knee surgeries during and after his junior season: one in October, one after the final regular season game and one after the team's bowl game.

In July 2014, Hamlett was named to the watchlist for the John Mackey Award, which is given to the best tight end in college football. On October 13, 2014, he was named to the midseason watchlist for the John Mackey Award. He played in 12 games, all starts, in 2014 and totaled 32 receptions for 342 yards and 2 touchdowns. He earned Pac-12 All-Academic first-team honors. He reportedly played his senior season "at about 80 percent" due to knee pain and other issues.

Hamlett played in 47 games, with 29 starts, during his college career. He recorded career totals of 104 receptions for 1,109 yards and 10 touchdowns. He was the fifth Oregon State tight end to record at least 1,000 career receiving yards. His 104 receptions were third most in school history for a tight end and his 1,109 receiving yards were fifth most in school history for a tight end.

== Professional career ==
=== Pre-draft ===
In a January 2015 story with The Herald, it was reported that Hamlett was retiring from football due to knee problems. Hamlett said that "after the season I decided it was time to hang it up. I didn’t want to be in pain every day. I felt like it was time to move on and live a normal life." He also said, "I’m sure I’ll wish I was still out there playing." In a story with The Florida Times-Union shortly after signing with the Jacksonville Jaguars, Hamlett said, "I just took some time off because I was banged up" and that "I love the game of football, and I wanted to play. The whole [story] kind of got blown out of proportion." He had previously returned to training and began feeling 100 percent in early March. Due to his break, he did not participate in the 2015 NFL Combine or Oregon State's Pro Day.

Hamlett was rated the 31st best tight end in the 2015 NFL draft by NFLDraftScout.com. Lance Zierlein of NFL.com projected that he would go undrafted and be a priority free agent. Zierlein stated that Hamlett was "Stiff, with limited athleticism" and that he "must improve his play strength at the point of attack and make his way as a blocking tight end to have a shot".

=== Early career ===
Hamlett signed with the Jacksonville Jaguars on May 3, 2015, after going undrafted in the 2015 draft. He was released by the Jaguars on August 29. He signed with the Jaguars on September 2 and was released by the team on September 4, 2015.

He was signed to the Philadelphia Eagles' practice squad on September 16, 2015. He was released by the Eagles on September 21, 2015.

Hamlett was signed to the New Orleans Saints' practice squad on September 23, 2015. He was released by the team on October 6, 2015.

=== Cleveland Browns ===
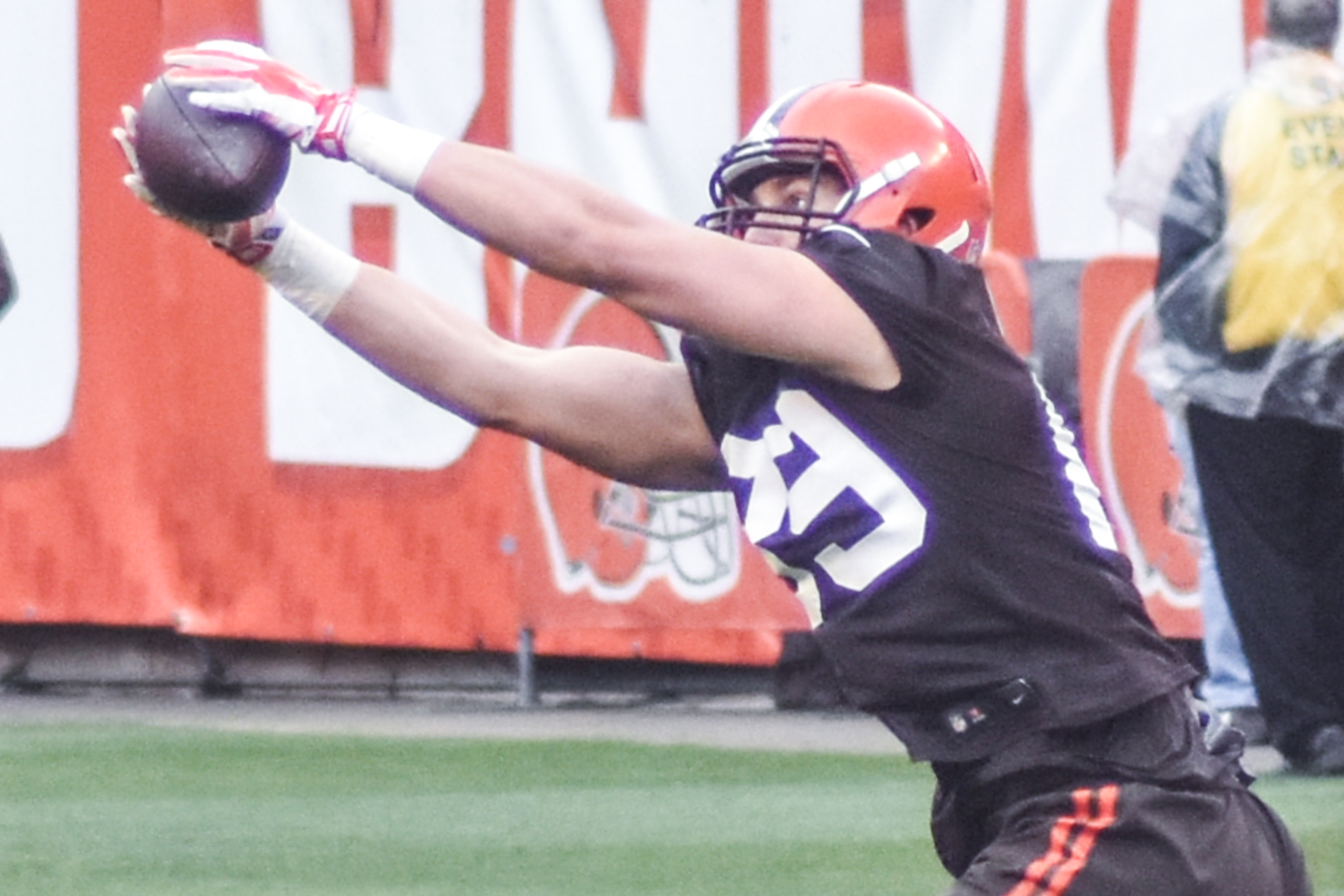
Hamlett with the Cleveland Browns in May 2016

Hamlett was signed to the Cleveland Browns' practice squad on December 8, 2015. He signed a reserve/future contract with the team on January 5, 2016. He was released by the Browns on September 3 and was signed to the team's practice squad on September 4. He was promoted to the active roster on October 4. He made his NFL debut, and first career start, against the New England Patriots on October 9 and recorded one reception, a 17-yard touchdown pass from Charlie Whitehurst. The Browns waived Hamlett on October 31. He was re-signed to the practice squad on November 2, 2016. He played in 3 games, starting 2, during the 2016 season and caught 1 pass for a 17-yard touchdown. Hamlett became a free agent after the 2016 season.

=== Later career ===
Hamlett signed a reserve/future contract with the Dallas Cowboys on January 16, 2017. He broke his fibula during a preseason game against the Los Angeles Rams on August 12. The injury was reported as possibly being season-ending. He was waived/injured on August 15, and placed on injured reserve on August 16. He was released on August 24, 2017, after reaching an injury settlement.

In 2018, Hamlett signed with the Arizona Hotshots of the Alliance of American Football for the 2019 season. He appeared in all 8 games, starting one, for the Hotshots, catching 5 passes for 40 yards. He also scored a two-point conversion. In April 2019, the rest of the season was cancelled after the league ceased operations.

In October 2019, Hamlett was selected by the Seattle Dragons during the 2020 XFL draft's open phase. He played in all five games for the Dragons, recording 4 receptions for 35 yards. In March, amid the COVID-19 pandemic, the league announced that it would be cancelling the rest of the season. He had his contract terminated when the league suspended operations on April 10, 2020.
