= Melissa Thomasson =

American economist

- Education: University of Puget Sound; University of Arizona
- Scientific career
- Fields: Economics
- Workplaces: National Bureau of Economic Research; Miami University
- Doctoral advisor: Price V. Fishback

Melissa A. Thomasson is an American economist. She is a professor of economics at the Farmer School of Business at Miami University in Oxford, Ohio, where she has also served as the chair of the department of economics. She studies economic history, focusing on the evolution of health insurance and health care in the United States.

== Education and positions ==
Thomasson attended the University of Puget Sound, where in 1992 she obtained a Bachelor of Science in economics with minors in mathematics and English literature. She then attended the University of Arizona, where she earned an MA in economics in 1993 followed by a PhD in economics in 1998. Her dissertation, From Sickness to Health: The Twentieth-Century Development of the Demand for Health Insurance, was supervised by Price V. Fishback.

After obtaining her PhD, Thomasson joined the economics faculty at Miami University, where she was named Julian Lange Professor of Economics in 2015 and department chair in 2019. Thomasson is the first woman to chair the economics department at Miami University. In 1999, Thomasson also joined the National Bureau of Economic Research, at first as a faculty research fellow and then as a research associate from 2005 onwards.

== Research ==
Thomasson's research focuses on the economic history of health insurance and health care in the United States. She has studied the relationship between American tax policy and health coverage, the development of health insurance in America, and the economic causes and implications of the evolution of childbirth from an event that mostly occurred at home to one that typically occurs in hospitals. Her 2004 paper "Early Evidence of an Adverse Selection Death Spiral?" won the 2005 award for the best paper published in the journal Explorations in Economic History in the previous year.

Thomasson has studied the impact that pandemics and epidemics can have on education, taking as a case the closure of schools during the 1916 New York City polio epidemic. During that epidemic, school openings in New York City were delayed by two weeks, and Thomasson and her co-authors demonstrated that the closures had a measurable effect on the children who experienced it, lowering the number of achievements they had when they graduated and also decreasing their probability of graduating at all. Thomasson has also shown that once schools did reopen, about 200,000 of the 829,000 students in the city did not return immediately, for fear of contracting the disease. During the widespread school closures caused by the COVID-19 pandemic, the NPR outlet WAMU cited Thomasson's research on this topic as a signal that parents might not permit their children to return to school immediately after schools officially reopen. An article in Forbes, citing the WAMU report on Thomasson's research, speculated that many parents might experiment with alternative means of education such as homeschooling shortly after policies allow schools to reopen.

Thomasson has studied the pressures that act on drug prices, and she discussed the economic history of drug prices in an interview for WNYC. She has also been interviewed on the topic of health care in America for NBC, WGBH, and NPR.

== Selected works ==
- "From sickness to health: the twentieth-century development of US health insurance", Explorations in Economic History (2002)
- "The importance of group coverage: How tax policy shaped US health insurance", American Economic Review (2003)
- "From home to hospital: The evolution of childbirth in the United States, 1928–1940", Explorations in Economic History (2008)
