= Paul Bryan =

Paul Bryan may refer to:

- Paul Bryan (musician) (born 1967), American musician
- Paul Bryan (politician) (1913–2004), British politician
- Paul Bryan (rugby league), Australian rugby league player

== See also ==
- Paul Bryant (disambiguation)
