= Bryant Bank =

Bank in Alabama, USA

- Founded: 2005
- Headquarters: Tuscaloosa, Alabama, United States
- Key people: Paul W. Bryant, Jr. (founder & chairman)
- Products: Financial services
- Website: bryantbank.com

Bryant Bank is a community bank in the U.S. state of Alabama.

== History ==
Bryant Bank was founded by Paul W. Bryant, Jr. in 2005. He serves as its Chairman.

It has branches in Tuscaloosa, Northport, Birmingham, Mountain Brook, Trussville, Columbiana, Hoover, Foley, Daphne, and Huntsville.

The bank has $1.4 billion of assets under management in 2016.
