= Robert Higgs =

American economic historian (born 1944)

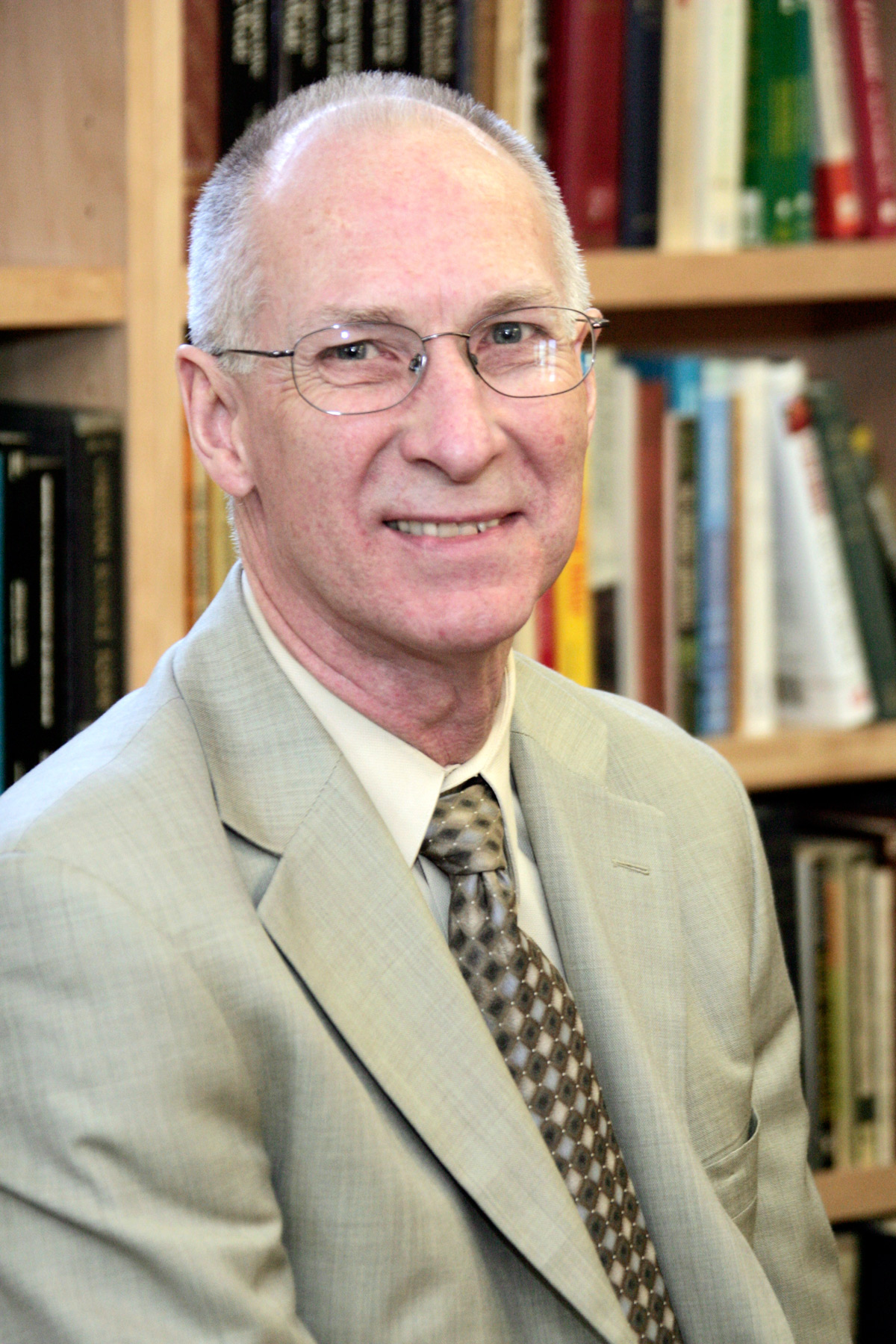
- Born: February 1, 1944 (age 82)

Academic background
- Doctoral advisor: Edwin Mills; H. Louis Stettler
- Influences: Kuznets, North, Coase, Schumpeter, Mises, Hayek, Rothbard

Academic work
- Discipline: Economic history, political economy, natural resource economics, health economics, military economics
- School or tradition: Austrian School
- Doctoral students: Price V. Fishback

Robert Higgs (born February 1, 1944) is an American economic historian and economist combining material from Public Choice, the new institutional economics, and the Austrian school of economics; and describes himself as a "libertarian anarchist" in political and legal theory and public policy. His writings in economics and economic history have most often focused on the causes, means, and effects of government power and growth.

== Academic career ==
Higgs earned a Ph.D. in economics from the Johns Hopkins University and has held teaching positions at the University of Washington, Lafayette College, and Seattle University. He has also been a visiting scholar at Oxford University and Stanford University. He held a visiting professorship at the University of Economics, Prague in 2006, and has supervised dissertations in the Ph.D. program at Universidad Francisco Marroquín, where he is currently an honorary professor of economics and history.

Higgs has been a Senior Fellow in Political Economy at the Independent Institute since September 1994. He served as Editor at Large of The Independent Reviews from 2013 to 2015 after having been Editor from 1995 to 2013.

In 2011 Higgs was the recipient of the Independent Institute's Alex de Toqueville Award which honors champions of individual liberty and in 2015 he received the Premio Juan de Mariana awarded by the Instituto Juam Mariana for outstanding contributions to promoting individual liberty and classical liberal ideas. Higgs was also the 2015 recipient of the Murray N. Rothbard Medal of Freedom.

== Writings ==
=== The Ratchet effect ===
In his ''Crisis and Leviathan'', Higgs first elaborated in detail on his ratchet hypothesis as part of a more general interpretation of governmental growth. Higgs aimed to demonstrate that contemporary models to explain the growth of government did not explain why growth historically occurred in spurts, rather than continuously. Higgs formulated the ratchet effect to explain this phenomenon. He theorized that most government growth occurred in response to real or imagined national "crises" and that after the crises, some, but rarely all, of the new interventions ceased. ''Crisis and Leviathan'' surveys the history of the American federal government from the 1880s to the 1980s, applying the ratchet effect to the period. He cites economic crises and wars as the chief sources for the growth of government.

Daniel McCarthy praised Higgs and summarized his ratchet effect theory in a review of Against Leviathan that appeared in The American Conservative. In the review, McCarthy remarked that

What made Crisis and Leviathan a milestone was the rigor with which it elaborated upon the logic of James Madison's 1794 warning against "the old trick of turning every contingency into a resource for accumulating force in government." Other political economists had studied the growth of state power during times of war, depression, and general upheaval before, but none had done so as thoughtfully and thoroughly as Higgs. He took special care in describing the "ratchet effect" – once a crisis has passed state power usually recedes again, but it rarely returns to its original levels; thus each emergency leaves the scope of government at least a little wider than before.

=== Foreign policy ===
During the 2008 presidential election, Higgs defended then-presidential candidate Ron Paul in response to Bret Stephens's article from The Wall Street Journal and made the case why "war, preparation for war, and foreign military interventions have served for the most part not to protect us, as we are constantly told, but rather to sap our economic vitality and undermine our civil and economic liberties."

== Bibliography ==
=== Books authored ===
- The Transformation of the American Economy, 1865–1914 (1971)
- Competition and Coercion: Blacks in the American Economy, 1865–1914 (1977)
- Crisis and Leviathan: Critical Episodes in the Growth of American Government (1987)
- Against Leviathan: Government Power and a Free Society (2004)
- Resurgence of the Warfare State: The Crisis Since 9/11 (2005)
- Depression, War and Cold War: Studies in Political Economy (2006)
- Politická ekonomie strachu ("The Political Economy of Fear") (Czech language; 2006)
- Neither Liberty Nor Safety: Fear, Ideology, and the Growth of Government (2007)
- Delusions of Power: New Explorations of the State, War, and Economy (2012)
- Taking a Stand: Reflections on Life, Liberty, and the Economy (2015)

=== Books edited ===
- Emergence of the Modern Political Economy (1985)
- Arms, Politics, and the Economy: Historical and Contemporary Perspectives (1990)
- Hazardous to Our Health? FDA Regulation of Health Care Products (1995)
- Re-Thinking Green: Alternatives to Environmental Bureaucracy with Carl P. Close (2005)
- The Challenge of Liberty: Classical Liberalism Today with Carl P. Close (2006)
- Opposing the Crusader State: Alternatives to Global Interventionism with Carl P. Close (2007)

=== Book contributions ===
- "War Can Rarely be Justified." War. Detroit: Greenhaven Press, 2014, pp. 27–36. ISBN 978-0737769715.
- Second Thoughts: Myths and Morals of U.S. Economic History, edited by Donald M. McCloskey. New York: Oxford University Press, 1993. ISBN 978-0195066333.
