= Hal Wolf =

American politician

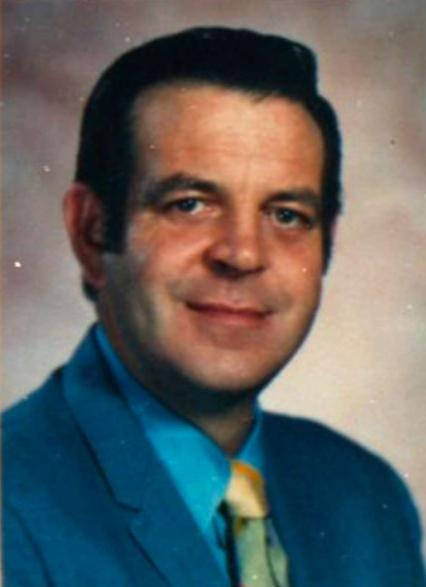
- Wolf in 1971

Member of the Washington House of Representatives from the 22nd district
- In office 1965–1973
- Succeeded by: Del Bausch

Personal details
- Born: January 31, 1926 Tacoma, Washington, U.S.
- Died: January 8, 1992 (aged 65)
- Party: Republican
- Spouse: Peggy Wolf
- Children: 3
- Education: University of Puget Sound

Hal Wolf (January 31, 1926 – January 8, 1992) was an American politician. He served as a Republican member for the 22nd district of the Washington House of Representatives.

== Life and career ==
Wolf was born in Tacoma, Washington. He attended Yelm High School and the University of Puget Sound. He served in the United States Navy during World War II.

In 1965, Wolf was elected to represent the 22nd district of the Washington House of Representatives. He served until 1973, when he was succeeded by Del Bausch.

He had 3 children. Diana Wolf, Harold E Wolf (also known as Hap) and Mark Warren Wolf.

Wolf died in January 1992 of cancer, at the age of 65.
