= Price V. Fishback =

American economic historian

- Citizenship: United States

Academic background
- Education: University of Washington; Butler University
- Doctoral advisor: Robert Higgs

Academic work
- Discipline: Economic History; Labor Economics; Political Economy; Law and Economics
- Institutions: University of Arizona

Price V. Fishback (born c. 1955) is an American economic historian. He is a professor of economics at the University of Arizona and a research associate at the National Bureau of Economic Research. His research on American economic history has included employment and labor in the nineteenth and early twentieth centuries especially in the coal industry, and government programs of the New Deal. His work has been recognised by the Cliometric Society via their awarding him a Clio Can in recognition of his "exceptional support of cliometrics". Prior to arriving to the University of Arizona, Fishback was an Assistant and later Associate Professor at the University of Georgia.

== Education ==
Fishback received a B.A. with honors in Mathematics and Economics from Butler University in 1977. He then received his M.A. and Ph.D. from the University of Washington in 1979 and 1983, respectively. His Ph.D. Thesis was entitled "Employment Conditions of Blacks in the Coal Industry, 1900-1930." His advisor was Robert Higgs.

== Selected publications ==
- Fishback, P. V.; Kantor, Shawn E. (2000). Prelude to the Welfare State: The Origins of Workers' Compensation. Chicago: University of Chicago Press.
- Fishback, P. V. (1992). Soft Coal, Hard Choices: The Economic Welfare of Bituminous Coal Miners, 1890 to 1930. New York: Oxford University Press.
- Well Worth Saving: How the New Deal Safeguarded Home Ownership, with Jonathan Rose and Kenneth Snowden. 2013. Chicago, IL: University of Chicago Press.
- "The Newest on the New Deal" Essays in Economic & Business History 36(1) (2018) covers distribution and impact of spending and lending programs; online
