= Judy MacLeod =

American sports administrator

Current position
- Title: Commissioner
- Conference: Conference USA

Biographical details
- Education: University of Puget Sound (BA) University of Tulsa (MS)

Playing career
- 1982–1986: Puget Sound
- Position: Forward

Coaching career (HC unless noted)
- 1986–1990: Seattle (asst. coach)

Administrative career (AD unless noted)
- 1991–1994: Tulsa (ticket manager)
- 1993–1994: Tulsa (asst. AD)
- 1994–1995: Tulsa (assoc. AD)
- 1995–2005: Tulsa
- 2006–2015: Conference USA (executive assoc. commissioner)
- 2015–present: Conference USA (commissioner)

Judith A. MacLeod is an American sports administrator and the current commissioner of Conference USA. She previously served as the athletic director at the University of Tulsa. MacLeod is the first woman to commission a conference in the NCAA Division I Football Bowl Subdivision (FBS).

== Early life and education ==
MacLeod was born to parents Scottish American Kenneth A. MacLeod (father) and Wilma Couchman (mother): a secretary for both Bumble Bee Foods and the Sons of Norway's Everett, Washington chapter, and has an older sister named Kim. MacLeod grew up in Edmonds, Washington and went to Meadowdale High School (Washington). MacLeod played forward and center on the high school's girls' basketball team from 1980 to 1982, and also played volleyball and softball (as first baseman). MacLeod earned Second Team, East Division Honors in her junior season. In MacLeod's senior season, she was the team captain and earned all-league 3A honorable mention honors in both basketball and softball. MacLeod graduated from Meadowdale High School as a salutatorian in 1982.

MacLeod attended the University of Puget Sound as an undergraduate, where she, like in high school, played forward on the school's women's basketball team. MacLeod became team captain on during her senior year. MacLeod graduated with a Bachelor of Arts degree in Economics in 1986.

MacLeod graduated with a Master's degree in Athletic Administration from The University of Tulsa in 1991.

== Career ==
=== Early career ===
MacLeod began her career in college sports coaching and administration at Seattle University, where she spent four seasons as an assistant basketball coach under head coach Dave Cox. MacLeod was part of the 1987-88 Women's Basketball Team coaching staff: Which was inducted into the University's Athletics Hall Of Fame in 2011. She also worked as a sports manager at the 1990 Goodwill Games, which inspired her to pursue a career in sports management.

=== University of Tulsa ===
In 1990, MacLeod became a graduate assistant at The University of Tulsa the same year. After working in various positions for the university's athletic department, including as an intern (from 1990 to 1991), a ticket manager (from 1991 to 1994), assistant athletic director (1993–1994) and associate athletic director (1994–1995), MacLeod was promoted as athletic director in 1995, a position she held for the next ten years. During MacLeod's tenure as athletic director, Tulsa built the Reynolds Center and several other new athletic facilities, and it moved its sports teams into the Western Athletic Conference and later into Conference USA.

=== Conference USA ===
In 2005, MacLeod left Tulsa to become an associate commissioner of Conference USA. She was promoted to executive associate commissioner the following year. While serving in that position, she was also a member of the NCAA Division I Men's Basketball Committee from 2012 to 2015. After Conference USA commissioner Britton Banowsky left his position in 2015, MacLeod was named the conference's new commissioner. She was the first and is so far the only woman to lead an FBS conference.

When MacLeod became commissioner, the conference had recently lost several teams to conference realignment, and its revenue from media rights had declined considerably. MacLeod signed several short-term contracts with streaming platforms to stabilize the conference's media revenue, but by 2019 the conference made $450,000 from its media rights, less than half of the $1.1 million it had made before realignment. After three schools left the American Athletic Conference (AAC) in 2021, MacLeod proposed that Conference USA merge with the AAC and reorganize into two geographically compact conferences. The AAC rejected the proposal and instead invited six Conference USA schools to replace the three departing schools, sparking an exodus that left Conference USA with fewer than the required eight members needed to maintain its FBS status. C-USA would soon restore its membership to the needed level to maintain FBS status. First, four schools were announced as new members effective in 2023–24 – FBS independents Liberty and New Mexico State (respectively full members of the ASUN Conference and WAC) and FCS upgraders Jacksonville State and Sam Houston. Another FCS upgrader, Kennesaw State, will join for 2024–25.
