= Robert Huey =

Robert Huey (born 1952) is Professor of Japanese Literature at the University of Hawaii at Manoa. He specializes in classical and medieval waka (poetry) and his most recent work examines how traditional Japanese literature and culture was practiced and deployed in the Ryukyu Kingdom both as pastime and diplomatic tool. He has served as a member of the University of the Ryukyus' Management Council since 2009 and is currently a Board Member for the Urasenke Hawaiʻi Foundation and Crown Prince Akihito Scholarship Foundation.

Huey has been Professor of Japanese Literature in the UH Mānoa Department of East Asian Languages and Literatures since 1985. He also served as director of UH Mānoa's Center for Japanese Studies and is widely recognized for his expertise in classical and medieval Japanese poetry, Japanese culture in the Ryukyu Kingdom, and Okinawan studies.

Huey has authored many works including monographs, articles, book chapters, among others. In 2014, he edited English translations of all entries in the Sakamaki-Hawley Collection database published on the University of the Ryukyus library website.

Huey has received numerous honors and awards for his academic work. He has also moderated, presented, and served on panels for hundreds of workshops, conferences and symposia. He was awarded an honorary doctorate by the University of Ryukyus in 2010 and, in 2019, he was presented with the Order of the Rising Sun, Gold Rays with Neck Ribbon.

== Education ==
- Ph.D., Stanford University, Asian Languages (Japanese), 1985
- M.A., Stanford University, Asian Languages (Japanese), 1980
- M.A., Stanford University, East Asian Studies, 1979
- B.A., University of Puget Sound, French, 1973

== Selected bibliography ==
- “Okinawan Studies at the University of Hawaiʻi: Twice Born; Suggestions for Further Research” International Journal of Okinawan Studies 4, no. 2, December 2013, pp. 65–78.
- The Making of Shinkokinshū (Cambridge: Harvard Univ. Asia Center, 2002), xx + 480 pp.
- Kyōgoku Tamekane: Poetry and Politics in Late Kamakura Japan (Stanford: Stanford University Press, 1989), xii + 228 pp.
