= Conference USA =

US college sports conference

- Association: NCAA
- Founded: 1995
- Commissioner: Judy MacLeod (since 2015)
- Sports fielded: 19; men's: 8; women's: 11
- Division: Division I
- Subdivision: FBS
- No. of teams: 10
- Headquarters: Dallas, Texas
- Region: Southern and Southwestern United States
- Broadcasters: CBS Sports; ESPN
- Website: conferenceusa.com

Locations
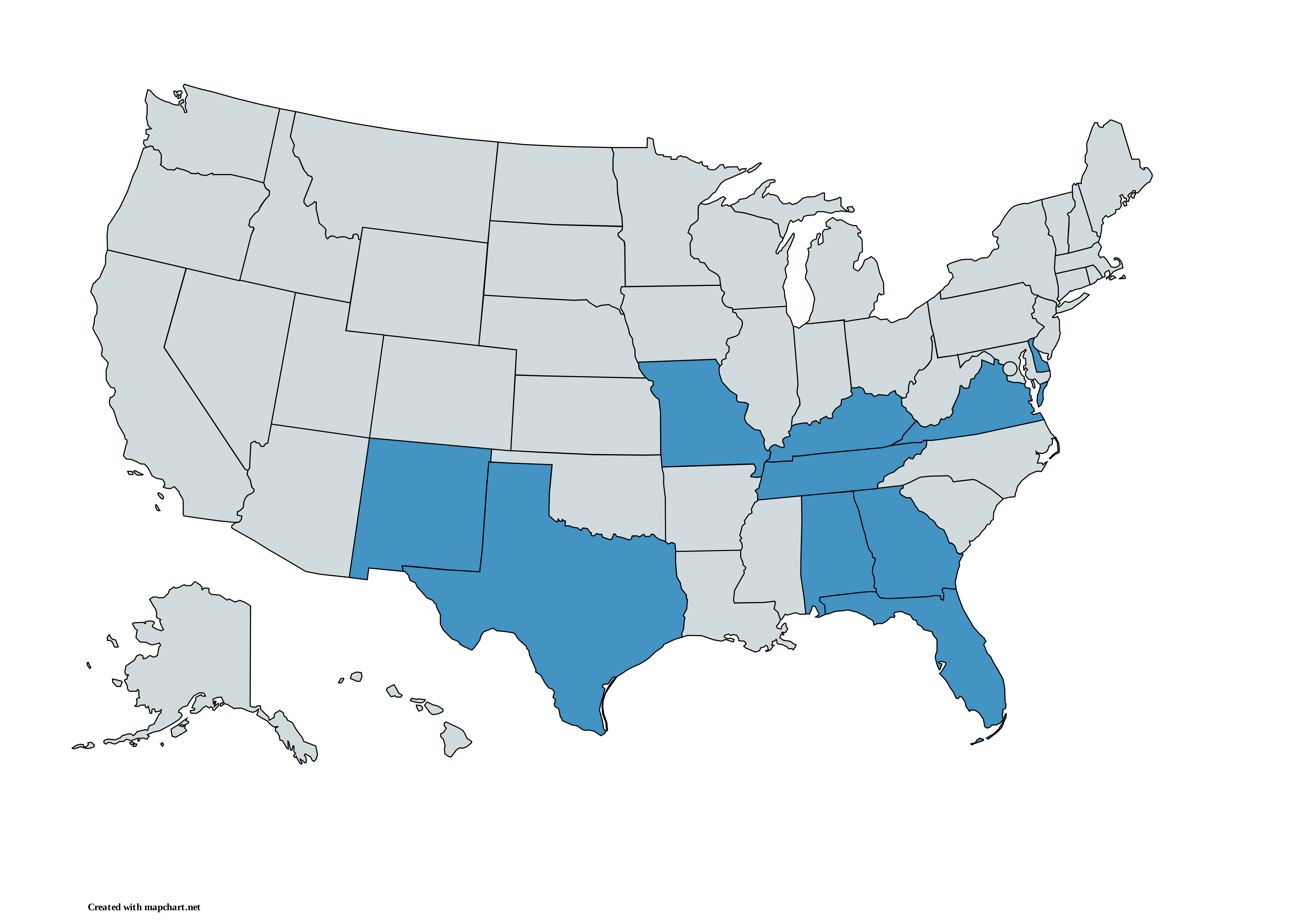

Conference USA (CUSA) is a collegiate athletic conference of member institutions in the Southern and Western United States. The conference participates in the NCAA's Division I in all sports, with football competing in the top-level Football Bowl Subdivision (FBS). CUSA's offices are located in Dallas, Texas.

Conference USA members
– Full member
– Affiliate member

== Member schools ==
=== Current full members ===
Institution	Location	Founded	Type	Enrollment	Median earnings	Endowment (millions)	Nickname	Joined (Note: Represents the calendar year when fall sports competition begins.)	Colors
University of Delaware	Newark, Delaware	1743	Public (Note: Delaware is officially chartered as a "privately governed, state-assisted" institution. This status is broadly similar to that of New York State's statutory colleges, most of which are housed at Cornell University, or institutions in Pennsylvania's Commonwealth System of Higher Education.)	24,564	$77,675	$1,770	Blue Hens	2025	
Florida International University (FIU)	Miami, Florida (Note: The FIU main campus is in the suburban Miami-Dade County community of University Park.)	1965 (Note: Though founded in 1965, classes did not start until 1972, and freshmen and sophomores were not admitted until 1981.)	Public	58,064	$62,192	$358	Panthers	2013 (Note: Florida International (FIU) was a men's soccer affiliate from the 2005 to 2012 fall seasons (2005–06 to 2012–13 school years).)	
Jacksonville State University (Jax State)	Jacksonville, Alabama	1883	Public	9,955	$55,318	$57	Gamecocks	2023 (Note: Jacksonville State was a beach volleyball affiliate during the 2023 spring season (2022–23 school year).)	
Kennesaw State University	Kennesaw, Georgia (Note: The KSU campus has a Kennesaw mailing address, but is located in unincorporated Cobb County.)	1963	Public	51,375	$68,306	$100	Owls	2024	
Liberty University	Lynchburg, Virginia	1971	Evangelical; Protestant	95,148 (Note: Includes online students. On-campus enrollment is approximately 16,000.)	$57,700	$3,500	Flames & Lady Flames	2023	
Middle Tennessee State University (MTSU)	Murfreesboro, Tennessee	1911	Public	21,913	$54,525	$108.9	Blue Raiders	2013	
Missouri State University	Springfield, Missouri	1905	Public	25,038	$53,058	$193	Bears & Lady Bears (Note: Missouri State's beach volleyball team uses Beach Bears instead of Lady Bears.)	2025 (Note: Missouri State joined CUSA as a beach volleyball affiliate in 2023, two years before becoming a full member.)	
New Mexico State University	Las Cruces, New Mexico	1888	Public	22,711	$54,874	$235.9	Aggies	2023	
Sam Houston State University	Huntsville, Texas	1879	Public	21,039	$57,044	$152.3	Bearkats	2023	
Western Kentucky University (WKU)	Bowling Green, Kentucky	1906	Public	17,672	$53,602	$209.5	Hilltoppers & Lady Toppers	2014 (Note: Western Kentucky was an affiliate in women's swimming & diving during the 2013–14 school year.)	

=== Affiliate members ===
In this table, all dates reflect the calendar year of entry into Conference USA, which for spring sports is the year before the start of competition.

Institution	Location	Founded	Type	Enrollment	Nickname	Joined (Note: Represents the calendar year when fall sports competition begins.)	Colors	CUSA sport(s)	Primary conference
University of Alabama at Birmingham (UAB)	Birmingham, Alabama	1969	Public	22,563	Blazers	2023 (Note: Measured from departure from full CUSA membership.)		Beach volleyball	American
Arkansas State University	Jonesboro, Arkansas	1909	Public	14,109	Red Wolves	2023		Bowling	Sun Belt
Florida Atlantic University (FAU)	Boca Raton, Florida	1961	Public	30,808	Owls	2023		Beach volleyball	American
University of Nebraska–Lincoln (Nebraska)	Lincoln, Nebraska	1869	Public	23,986	Cornhuskers	2025		Bowling	Big Ten
Sacred Heart University	Fairfield, Connecticut	1963	Catholic (Dioceses of Bridgeport)	5,974	Pioneers	2025		Bowling	Metro
University of South Florida	Tampa, Florida	1956	Public	50,830	Bulls	2025		Beach volleyball	American
University of Texas at El Paso (UTEP)	El Paso, Texas	1914	Public	25,121	Miners	2026		Beach volleyball	Mountain West
Tulane University	New Orleans, Louisiana	1834	Nonsectarian	11,722	Green Wave	2022		Beach volleyball	American
Tulane University	New Orleans, Louisiana	1834	Nonsectarian	11,722	Green Wave	2023		Bowling	American
Valparaiso University	Valparaiso, Indiana	1859	Lutheran	2,900	Beacons	2023		Bowling	MVC
Vanderbilt University	Nashville, Tennessee	1873	Nonsectarian	13,798	Commodores	2023		Bowling	SEC
Wichita State University	Wichita, Kansas	1895	Public	17,548	Shockers	2024		Bowling	American
Wright State University	Fairborn, Ohio (Note: The Wright State campus is physically located in Fairborn but has a Dayton mailing address.)	1964	Public	17,074	Raiders	2025		Bowling	Horizon
Youngstown State University	Youngstown, Ohio	1908	Public	15,058	Penguins	2023		Bowling	Horizon

=== Former full members ===
Institution	Location	Founded	Type	Nickname	Joined (Note: Represents the calendar year when fall sports competition begins.)	Left (Note: Represents the calendar year when spring sports competition ends.)	Colors	Current conference
University of Alabama at Birmingham (Note: FAU and UAB remain CUSA affiliate members in beach volleyball.) (UAB)	Birmingham, Alabama	1969	Public	Blazers	1995 (Note: UAB was a full but non-football member at two different times—1995–96 to 1998–99, when the school was independent in football, and 2015–16 to 2016–17, after UAB discontinued its football program. UAB football returned for the 2017 fall season (effective the 2017–18 school year).)	2023		American
University of Central Florida (UCF)	Orlando, Florida (Note: The UCF campus has an Orlando mailing address but is entirely located in unincorporated Orange County.)	1963	Public	Knights	2005	2013		Big 12
University of Cincinnati	Cincinnati, Ohio	1819	Public	Bearcats	1995	2005		Big 12
DePaul University	Chicago, Illinois	1898	Catholic (Vincentians)	Blue Demons	1995	2005		Big East
East Carolina University	Greenville, North Carolina	1907	Public	Pirates	2001 (Note: East Carolina was an affiliate in football from the 1997 to 2000 fall seasons (1997–98 to 2000–01 school years).)	2014		American
Florida Atlantic University (FAU)	Boca Raton, Florida	1961	Public	Owls	2013	2023		American
University of Houston	Houston, Texas	1927	Public	Cougars	1996 (Note: Houston was a founding member of CUSA in 1995 but did not begin competition until the 1996–97 school year because of its commitments to the final year of competition as a full member of the Southwest Conference.)	2013		Big 12
Louisiana Tech University (LaTech)	Ruston, Louisiana	1894	Public	Bulldogs & Lady Techsters	2013	2026		Sun Belt
University of Louisville	Louisville, Kentucky	1798	Public	Cardinals	1995	2005		ACC
Marquette University	Milwaukee, Wisconsin	1881	Catholic (Jesuit)	Golden Eagles	1995	2005		Big East
Marshall University	Huntington, West Virginia	1837	Public	Thundering Herd	2005	2022		Sun Belt
University of Memphis	Memphis, Tennessee	1912	Public	Tigers	1995	2013		American
University of North Carolina at Charlotte (Charlotte)	Charlotte, North Carolina	1946	Public	49ers	1995	2005		American
University of North Carolina at Charlotte (Charlotte)	Charlotte, North Carolina	1946	Public	49ers	2013	2023		American
University of North Texas	Denton, Texas	1890	Public	Mean Green	2013	2023		American
Old Dominion University	Norfolk, Virginia	1930	Public	Monarchs	2013 (Note: Old Dominion was an affiliate in men's golf, women's golf, rowing, men's tennis, and women's tennis in 2012–13; later becoming a full but non-football member in 2013–14; until adding football in 2014–15.)	2022		Sun Belt
Rice University	Houston, Texas	1912	Nonsectarian	Owls	2005	2023		American
Saint Louis University	St. Louis, Missouri	1818	Catholic (Jesuit)	Billikens	1995	2005		Atlantic 10
University of South Florida (Note: South Florida became an affiliate member for beach volleyball in 2025.) (USF)	Tampa, Florida	1956	Public	Bulls	1995	2005		American
Southern Methodist University (SMU)	Dallas, Texas (Note: The SMU campus has a Dallas mailing address, but is located almost entirely in University Park, a separate city contained within the Dallas city limits.)	1911	United; Methodist	Mustangs	2005	2013		ACC
University of Southern Mississippi (Southern Miss)	Hattiesburg, Mississippi	1910	Public	Golden Eagles	1995	2022		Sun Belt
Texas Christian University (Note: TCU returned to CUSA as a beach volleyball affiliate in 2023, but left after the 2024 spring season when the Big 12 began sponsoring that sport.) (TCU)	Fort Worth, Texas	1873	Disciples of Christ	Horned Frogs	2001	2005		Big 12
University of Texas at El Paso (UTEP)	El Paso, Texas	1914	Public	Miners	2005	2026		Mountain West
University of Texas at San Antonio (UTSA)	San Antonio, Texas	1969	Public	Roadrunners	2013	2023		American
Tulane University (Note: Tulane returned to CUSA as a beach volleyball affiliate in 2022, and added bowling to its CUSA membership in 2023.)	New Orleans, Louisiana	1834	Nonsectarian	Green Wave	1995	2014		American
University of Tulsa	Tulsa, Oklahoma	1894	Nondenominational (Note: Historically affiliated with the Presbyterian Church (USA).)	Golden Hurricane	2005	2014		American

=== Former affiliate members ===
In this table, all dates reflect each school's actual entry into and departure from Conference USA. In the case of the two former affiliates that became full CUSA members, the "left" date reflects their elevation to full membership.

For spring sports, the joining date is the calendar year before the start of competition. For fall sports, the departure date is the calendar year after the last season of competition.

Institution	Location	Founded	Type	Nickname	Joined (Note: Represents the calendar year when fall sports competition begins.)	Left (Note: Represents the calendar year when spring sports competition ends.)	Colors	CUSA sport(s)	Primary conference
University of Alabama	Tuscaloosa, Alabama	1831	Public	Crimson Tide	2009	2014		Women's rowing	SEC
United States Military Academy (Army)	West Point, New York	1802	Federal	Black Knights	1998	2005		Football	Patriot (Note: Football competed as an FBS independent through the 2023 season, and joined the American in 2024.)
California State University, Bakersfield (Note: The university began rebranding its athletic program as the Bakersfield Roadrunners in 2023–24.)	Bakersfield, California	1965	Public	Roadrunners	2007	2010		Women's swimming & diving	Big West
California State University, Sacramento (Sacramento State)	Sacramento, California	1947	Public	Hornets	2013	2014		Women's rowing	Big West (Note: Rowing affiliate of the WCC.)
Coastal Carolina University	Conway, South Carolina	1954	Public	Chanticleers	2021	2022		Beach volleyball	Sun Belt
Coastal Carolina University	Conway, South Carolina	1954	Public	Chanticleers	2021	2022		Men's soccer	Sun Belt
Colorado College	Colorado Springs, Colorado	1874	Nonsectarian	Tigers	2006	2014		Women's soccer	SCAC (Note: Currently an NCAA Division III athletic conference.) (Note: Women's soccer affiliate of the Mountain West.)
Dallas Baptist University	Dallas, Texas	1898	Baptist	Patriots	2022	2026		Baseball	Lone Star (Note: Currently an NCAA Division II athletic conference.) (Note: Baseball affiliate of the Pac-12.)
University of Evansville	Evansville, Indiana	1854	United; Methodist	Purple Aces	1995	1996		Women's soccer	Missouri Valley
Georgia State University	Atlanta, Georgia	1913	Public	Panthers	2021	2022		Beach volleyball	Sun Belt
Jacksonville State University	Jacksonville, Alabama	1883	Public	Gamecocks	2022	2023		Beach volleyball	CUSA (Note: Jacksonville State joined CUSA beach volleyball a year before becoming a full member.)
University of Kansas	Lawrence, Kansas	1865	Public	Jayhawks	2009	2014		Women's rowing	Big 12
Kansas State University	Manhattan, Kansas	1863	Public	Wildcats	2009	2014		Women's rowing	Big 12
University of Kentucky	Lexington, Kentucky	1865	Public	Wildcats	2005	2022		Men's soccer	SEC (Note: Men's soccer affiliate of the Sun Belt.)
Missouri State University	Springfield, Missouri	1905	Public	Beach Bears	2023	2025		Beach volleyball	CUSA (Note: Missouri State joined CUSA beach volleyball two years before becoming a full member.)
University of New Mexico	Albuquerque, New Mexico	1889	Public	Lobos	2013	2019		Men's soccer	Mountain West (Note: Dropped men's soccer after the 2018 season (2018–19 school year).)
University of North Dakota	Grand Forks, North Dakota	1883	Public	Fighting Hawks	2008	2011		Women's swimming & diving	Summit (Note: Dropped women's swimming & diving after the 2016 season (2016–17 school year).)
University of Northern Colorado	Greeley, Colorado	1889	Public	Bears	2007	2010		Women's swimming & diving	Big Sky (Note: Women's swimming & diving affiliate of the MPSF.)
University of Oklahoma	Norman, Oklahoma	1890	Public	Sooners	2009	2014		Women's rowing	SEC
San Diego State University	San Diego, California	1947	Public	Aztecs	2013	2014		Women's rowing	Pac-12 (Note: Dropped rowing after the 2020–21 season; had previously been an affiliate of the American in that sport.)
University of South Carolina	Columbia, South Carolina	1801	Public	Gamecocks	2005	2022		Men's soccer	SEC
Stephen F. Austin State University (Stephen F. Austin)	Nacogdoches, Texas	1923	Public	Ladyjacks	2023	2025		Bowling	Southland (Note: Dropped bowling after the 2025 spring season (2024–25 school year).)
Tarleton State University	Stephenville, Texas	1899	Public	Texans	2023	2026		Beach volleyball	UAC
Texas Christian University (TCU)	Fort Worth, Texas	1873	Disciples of Christ	Horned Frogs	2023	2024		Beach volleyball	Big 12
University of Tennessee	Knoxville, Tennessee	1794	Public	Lady Volunteers	2009	2014		Women's rowing	SEC
University of Texas at Austin	Austin, Texas	1883	Public	Longhorns	2009	2014		Women's rowing	SEC
University of Louisiana at Monroe (ULM)	Monroe, Louisiana	1865	Public	Warhawks	2021	2022		Beach volleyball	Sun Belt
West Virginia University	Morgantown, West Virginia	1867	Public	Mountaineers	2012	2014		Women's rowing	Big 12

=== Membership timeline ===
Full members (all-sports) Full members (non-football) Affiliate members (football-only) Affiliate member (other sport) Other conference 1 Other conference 2

== History ==
CUSA (abbreviated "C-USA" before 2023) was founded in 1995 by the merger of the Metro Conference and Great Midwest Conference, two Division I conferences that did not sponsor football. However, the merger did not include either Great Midwest member Dayton or Metro members VCU and Virginia Tech. Since this left an uneven number of schools in the conference, University of Houston of the dissolving Southwest Conference was extended an invitation and agreed to join following the SWC's disbanding at the end of the 1995–96 academic year. The conference immediately started competition in all sports, except football which started in 1996.

Being the result of a merger, CUSA was originally a sprawling, large league that stretched from Florida to Missouri, Wisconsin to Texas. Many of its original schools were located in major urban centers and had strong basketball traditions, which helped establish the league on a national basis.

=== 2005–06 realignment ===
The conference saw radical changes for the 2005–06 academic year. The Big East Conference had lost several members, and looked to Conference USA to attract replacements. Five CUSA members departed for the Big East, including three football-playing schools (Cincinnati, Louisville, and South Florida) and two non-football schools (DePaul and Marquette; both joined the New Big East in 2013). Another two schools (Charlotte and Saint Louis) left for the Atlantic 10; TCU joined the Mountain West (and is now in the Big 12 with several other former Southwest Conference members); and a ninth member, Army, which was C-USA football-only, opted to become an independent in that sport again.

With the loss of these members, CUSA lured six schools from other conferences: UCF and Marshall from the MAC, as well as Rice, SMU, Tulsa, and later UTEP from the WAC. UCF played in the MAC for football only; for all other sports, it was a member of the Atlantic Sun Conference (ASUN).

With CUSA's membership now consisting of 12 schools, all of which sponsor football, the conference adopted a two-division alignment.

=== 2013–14 realignment ===
In 2013, CUSA entered its next phase with the departure of four schools (Houston, Memphis, SMU, and UCF) for the American Athletic Conference, the football-sponsoring portion of the former Big East Conference. This was again the result of Big East schools leaving for the ACC, this time being Syracuse and Pittsburgh, as well as Notre Dame for non-football sports.

However, when the conferences discussed their plans with the NCAA, they were told that if they merged, the new league would receive only one automatic bid to NCAA championships; at least one of the former conferences would lose expected future revenues from the NCAA men's basketball tournament; and at least one former conference would lose exit fees from any schools that departed for the new league. As a result, both CUSA and the MW backed away from a full merger. As of April 2012, the likeliest scenario was an all-sports alliance in which both conferences retained separate identities. However, after the MW added more members, the alliance was apparently abandoned.

For men's soccer, there was a chance that the MW, SEC, and CUSA along with the one Sun Belt member (FIU), that sponsor the sport, would play under the CUSA's men's soccer program. The MW, which does not sponsor men's soccer, would take three of the four members that offer the sport (UNLV, Air Force, New Mexico—San Diego State is a Pac-12 associate member in that sport), join CUSA's three full members that offer the sport (UAB, Marshall, Tulsa), the two SEC members already in CUSA for the sport (Kentucky, South Carolina), and the Sun Belt's FIU. However, the only MW member school that ultimately moved to CUSA men's soccer was New Mexico.

For the 2013–14 season CUSA invited five new members to join their conference, with all accepting. UTSA and Louisiana Tech joined from the WAC and North Texas and FIU, (an affiliate member of CUSA joining for men's soccer in 2005), from the Sun Belt Conference. Old Dominion, which already housed five of its sports in CUSA, moved the rest of its athletic program from the CAA (except for field hockey, women's lacrosse and wrestling, with the three sports joining the new Big East, the Atlantic Sun, and the MAC respectively because CUSA does not sponsor those sports) and upgraded its football program from the Football Championship Subdivision. Charter member Charlotte returned from the A-10 and accelerated its recently established football program, which was set to begin play in 2013 as an FCS school, to FBS in 2015 with full conference rights in 2016.

=== 2014–15 realignment ===
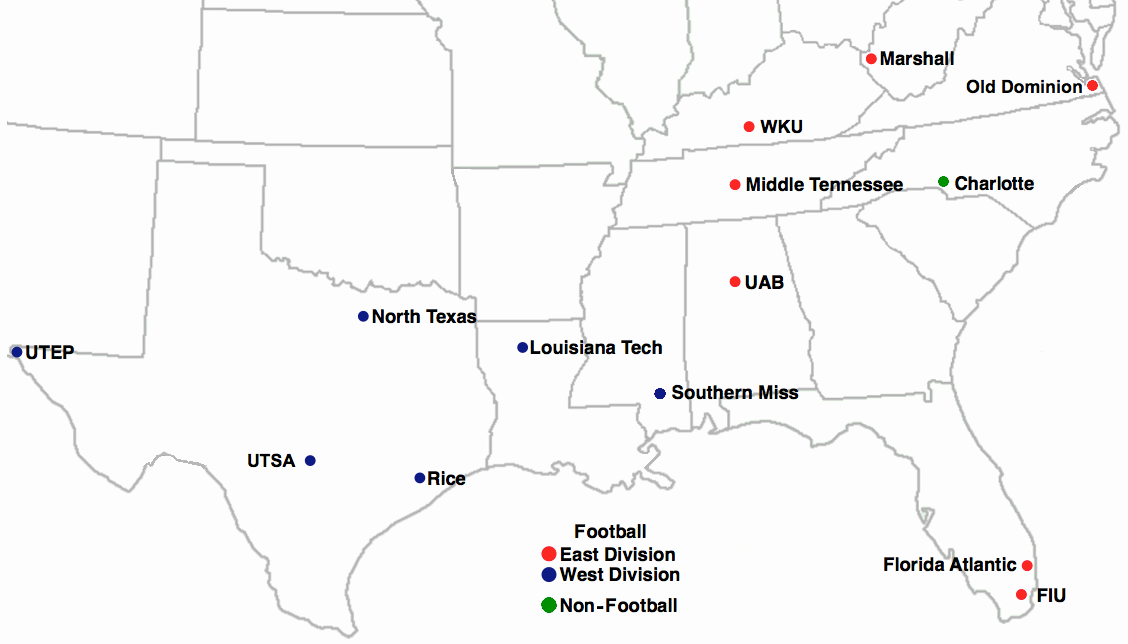
Conference USA members after the 2014–15 realignment

On November 27, 2012, it was announced that Tulane would leave the conference, effective in the 2014 season, to join the Big East in all sports, and East Carolina would join the Big East for football only (ECU's membership was upgraded to all-sports in March 2013 after the Big East's non-football members, except ACC-bound Notre Dame, announced they were leaving to form a new conference which took the Big East name, leaving the football-playing members to become the American Athletic Conference). Conference USA responded by adding Middle Tennessee and Florida Atlantic, both from the Sun Belt.

On April 1, 2013, Conference USA announced it was adding Western Kentucky, also from the Sun Belt, to offset Tulsa's departure to The American in all sports which was confirmed the next day.

=== 2014–2021 ===
The board of trustees in the University of Alabama System (of which UAB is a member) voted to shut down that football program on December 2, 2014, in a highly controversial move that many have attributed to a pro-Tuscaloosa bias (including trustees such as Paul Bryant Jr., son and namesake of Alabama football coaching legend Bear Bryant). According to Conference USA bylaws, member schools must sponsor football. In January 2015, UAB announced an independent re-evaluation of the program and the finances involved, leaving open a possible resumption of the program as early as the 2016 season. On January 29, 2015, the conference announced that there was no time pressure in making a decision regarding UAB's future membership. The conference also stated that it would wait for the new study results before any further discussions on the subject. On June 1, UAB announced that it would reinstate football effective with the 2016 season, presumably keeping the school in CUSA for the immediate future. The return of football was later pushed back to 2017 with their first game in September. The Blazers won the 2018 conference championship their second year back and won the CUSA title again in 2020.

Commissioner Britton Banowsky stepped down on September 15, 2015, to become the head of the College Football Playoff Foundation. Executive associate commissioner and chief operating officer Judy MacLeod was subsequently named interim commissioner. On October 26 MacLeod was named the conference's third official commissioner, also becoming the first woman to head an NCAA Division I Football Bowl Subdivision (FBS) conference.

Marshall University's men's soccer program captured the league's first team national championship with its 1–0 overtime win over Indiana in the 2020 College Cup, held in May 2021 due to COVID-19 issues, in Cary, North Carolina.

=== 2020s realignment ===
On October 18, 2021, Yahoo Sports reported that the American Athletic Conference, which had been rocked by the impending departure of three of its most prominent schools (Cincinnati, Houston, UCF) for the Big 12 Conference, was preparing to receive applications from six CUSA members: Charlotte, Florida Atlantic, North Texas, Rice, UAB, and UTSA. ESPN reported the next day that The American had received all six schools' applications, and The American announced all six as future members on October 21, though it did not announce the effective date. The entry date would eventually be confirmed as July 1, 2023.

The day after The American announced its expansion, The Action Network reported that Southern Miss had accepted an invitation to join the Sun Belt Conference in 2023, a move which was formally announced by the university on October 26. The report added that the Sun Belt was preparing to add two other CUSA members in Marshall and Old Dominion, as well as FCS program James Madison. Old Dominion officially announced its move to the Sun Belt Conference on October 27, followed later in the week by Marshall. On March 29, 2022, CUSA agreed to allow Marshall, Old Dominion, and Southern Miss to move to the Sun Belt beginning July 1, 2022, a year earlier than initially announced.

In response to these losses, on November 5, Conference USA announced the addition of four new members to start the 2023 athletic season. These included two ASUN schools, Liberty and Jacksonville State, along with two from the WAC, New Mexico State and Sam Houston. Liberty and New Mexico State previously played football as FBS independents, while Jacksonville State and Sam Houston played at the FCS level in their respective conferences.

On October 7, 2022, Pete Thamel of ESPN reported that current football-sponsoring ASUN member Kennesaw State was in talks to become the tenth member of Conference USA for the 2024 season. One week later, CUSA officially announced Kennesaw State's 2024 entry.

This was followed by the Sun Belt Conference adding beach volleyball for the 2023 season (2022–23 school year), taking with it the three full SBC members that had previously housed that sport in CUSA: Coastal Carolina, Georgia State, and Louisiana–Monroe. Southern Miss also left CUSA beach volleyball as part of its full-time move to the SBC. CUSA would add three new beach volleyball members for that season; Jacksonville State joined CUSA for beach volleyball in advance of full membership that July, Tulane became an associate member, and full member UTEP added a new beach volleyball program. Tarleton announced on April 24, 2023, that it would join CUSA as an associate member for the school's first season of varsity beach volleyball in 2024; CUSA confirmed this on May 11, adding that Missouri State and TCU would also join in beach volleyball for the 2024 season, and that Florida Atlantic and UAB would remain in CUSA beach volleyball after otherwise departing for The American.

On May 10, 2023, CUSA announced that it would add bowling, a women-only sport in the NCAA, effective in 2023–24. The Southland Bowling League, a single-sport conference established by the Southland Conference, was merged into CUSA. The bowling league added Wichita State when it elevated its club team to varsity status in 2024–25.

The conference unveiled a "brand refresh" on July 1, 2023, the same day that Jacksonville State, Liberty, New Mexico State, and Sam Houston joined. The former abbreviation of "C-USA" was retired in favor of "CUSA", and the logo was slightly updated.

On November 27, 2023, Pete Thamel reported on X that Conference USA was expected to add Delaware as a new member for the 2025–26 season. Both CUSA and Delaware announced on their websites and social media on November 28, 2023, the official move to make Delaware the eleventh all-sports member of the conference. Six months later, on May 10, 2024, both CUSA and Missouri State University jointly announced on their respective websites that Missouri State would also join the league for the 2025–26 season, bringing league membership up to 12. The 12-member lineup will last only one year, as UTEP, the longest-tenured current member, will leave for the Mountain West Conference in 2026.

On November 5, 2024, the conference announced that former full member South Florida would join as an affiliate member in beach volleyball in 2025. Bowling affiliate Stephen F. Austin announced on May 22, 2025 that it had dropped the sport effective immediately.

== Hall of Fame ==
In 2019, Conference USA inducted its first Hall of Fame class, comprising 20 student-athletes, three coaches, and two administrators. The inductees included former University of Cincinnati basketball player Kenyon Martin, baseball player Kevin Youkilis, and men's basketball head coach Bob Huggins.

== Commissioners ==
- Michael Slive 1995–2002
- Britton Banowsky 2002–2015
- Judy MacLeod 2015—

== Sports ==
=== Sports sponsored ===
Conference USA sponsors championship competition in eight men's and 11 women's NCAA sanctioned sports. Eleven schools are affiliate members—one in baseball, four in beach volleyball, five in bowling, and one in both beach volleyball and bowling. The most recent changes in sports sponsorship were the dropping of men's soccer and women's swimming and diving after the 2021–22 season, plus the addition of bowling in 2023–24.

Teams in CUSA competition (Note: Numbers of teams are as of the 2023–24 school year.)
Sport	Men's	Women's
Baseball	12	–
Basketball	12	12
Beach volleyball	–	9
Bowling	–	12
Cross Country	10	12
Football	12	–
Golf	11	10
Soccer	–	12
Softball	–	12
Tennis	6	12
Track and Field (Indoor)	8	12
Track and Field (Outdoor)	9	12
Volleyball	–	12

=== Men's sponsored sports by school ===
Member	Baseball	Basketball	Cross Country	Football	Golf	Tennis	Indoor Track & Field	Outdoor Track & Field	Total CUSA Sports
Delaware	Yes	Yes	No	Yes	Yes	Yes	No	No	5
FIU	Yes	Yes	Yes	Yes	No	No	No	Yes	5
Jacksonville State	Yes	Yes	Yes	Yes	Yes	Yes	No	No	6
Kennesaw State	Yes	Yes	Yes	Yes	Yes	Yes	Yes	Yes	8
Liberty	Yes	Yes	Yes	Yes	Yes	Yes	Yes	Yes	8
Middle Tennessee	Yes	Yes	Yes	Yes	Yes	Yes	Yes	Yes	8
Missouri State	Yes	Yes	No	Yes	Yes	No	No	No	4
New Mexico State	Yes	Yes	Yes	Yes	Yes	Yes	Yes	Yes	8
Sam Houston	Yes	Yes	Yes	Yes	Yes	No	Yes	Yes	7
Western Kentucky	Yes	Yes	Yes	Yes	Yes	No	Yes	Yes	7
Total	10	10	8	10	9	6	6	7	66

==== Men's varsity sports not sponsored by Conference USA ====
School	Lacrosse	Rifle (Note: NCAA rifle is a coeducational team sport, with men and women competing with and against one another as equals. Jacksonville State fields a single coed team.)	Soccer	Swimming & diving
Delaware	A-10	No	Summit	ASUN
FIU	No	No	American	No
Jacksonville State	No	IND	No	No
Liberty	No	No	SoCon	No
Missouri State	No	No	American	MVC

=== Women's sponsored sports by school ===
Departing members in pink.

Member	Basketball	Beach Volleyball	Bowling	Cross Country	Golf	Soccer	Softball	Tennis	Indoor Track & Field	Outdoor Track & Field	Volleyball	Total CUSA Sports
Delaware	Yes	No	No	Yes	Yes	Yes	Yes	Yes	Yes	Yes	Yes	9
FIU	Yes	Yes	No	Yes	Yes	Yes	Yes	Yes	Yes	Yes	Yes	10
Jacksonville State	Yes	No	Yes	Yes	Yes	Yes	Yes	Yes	Yes	Yes	Yes	10
Kennesaw State	Yes	No	No	Yes	Yes	Yes	Yes	Yes	Yes	Yes	Yes	9
Liberty	Yes	No	No	Yes	No	Yes	Yes	Yes	Yes	Yes	Yes	8
Middle Tennessee	Yes	No	No	Yes	Yes	Yes	Yes	Yes	Yes	Yes	Yes	9
Missouri State	Yes	Yes	No	Yes	Yes	Yes	Yes	Yes	Yes	Yes	Yes	10
New Mexico State	Yes	No	No	Yes	Yes	Yes	Yes	Yes	Yes	Yes	Yes	9
Sam Houston	Yes	Yes	Yes	Yes	Yes	Yes	Yes	Yes	Yes	Yes	Yes	11
Western Kentucky	Yes	No	No	Yes	Yes	Yes	Yes	Yes	Yes	Yes	Yes	9
Affiliate members
Arkansas State			Yes									1
Florida Atlantic		Yes										1
Nebraska			Yes									1
Sacred Heart			Yes									1
South Florida		Yes										1
Tulane		Yes	Yes									2
UAB		Yes										1
UTEP		Yes										1
Valparaiso			Yes									1
Vanderbilt			Yes									1
Wichita State			Yes									1
Wright State			Yes									1
Youngstown State			Yes									1
Total	11	8	12	11	9	11	11	11	11	11	11	116

==== Women's varsity sports not sponsored by Conference USA ====
School	Acrobatics & Tumbling (Note: Graduated from the NCAA Emerging Sports for Women program in January 2026. The first NCAA championships for acrobatics & tumbling and stunt will be held in 2026–27.)	Equestrian (Note: Part of the NCAA Emerging Sports for Women program.)	Field hockey	Ice Hockey	Lacrosse	Rifle (Note: Rifle is technically classified as a men's sport by the NCAA, but allows competitors of both sexes, and also allows schools to field any combination of coed and single-sex teams. Jacksonville State fields a coed team.)	Rowing	Stunt	Swimming & Diving
Delaware	No	No	MPSF (Note: Joining the MAC in 2027.)	AHA	ASUN	No	MAC	No	ASUN
FIU	No	No	No	No	No	No	No	No	American
Jacksonville State	No	No	No	No	No	IND	No	No	No
Kennesaw State	No	No	No	No	ASUN	No	No	No	No
Liberty	No	No	Big East	No	ASUN	No	No	No	American
Missouri State	IND	No	No	No	No	No	No	IND	MVC
New Mexico State	No	IND	No	No	No	No	No	No	MPSF

=== Football ===
Conference USA used a divisional format for football from 2005 to 2021.

For the upcoming season, see 2025 Conference USA football season.

Team	First season	All-time record	All-time win %	Bowl appearances	Bowl record	Conference titles	Head coach
FIU	2002	92–178	.341	5	2–3	1	Willie Simmons
Jacksonville State	1904	621–423–40	.573	2	1–1	25	Charles Kelly
Liberty	1973	307–258–4	.543	6	3–3	8	Jamey Chadwell
Louisiana Tech	1901	645–504–38	.559	14	8–5–1	25	Sonny Cumbie
Middle Tennessee	1911	608–472–28	.561	14	6–8	13	Derek Mason
New Mexico State	1893	459–679–30	.406	6	4–1–1	4	Tony Sanchez
Sam Houston	1912	573–489–36	.538	5	3–1–1	15	Phil Longo
UTEP	1914	415–626–28	.401	15	5–10	2	Scotty Walden
Western Kentucky	1908	615–426–31	.588	11	7–4	13	Tyson Helton

CUSA champions

Bowl games

Through the 2023 season, the highest-ranked champion from the so-called "Group of Five" conferences (The American, CUSA, MAC, Mountain West, and Sun Belt) was guaranteed a berth in one of the non-semifinal bowls of the College Football Playoff if the group's top team was not in the playoff. Starting in 2024, at least one Group of Five conference champion will receive a berth in the expanded 12-team CFP.

Name	Location	Stadium	Opposing Conference
Cotton Bowl Classic	Arlington, Texas	AT&T Stadium	at-large
Fiesta Bowl	Glendale, Arizona	State Farm Stadium	at-large
Peach Bowl	Atlanta, Georgia	Mercedes-Benz Stadium	at-large

For the 2014–19 seasons, Conference USA was guaranteed at least five of the following bowl games. Stadiums and names reflect those in use during that period.

Name	Location	Stadium	Opposing Conference
Arizona Bowl	Tucson, Arizona	Arizona Stadium	Mountain West
Armed Forces Bowl	Fort Worth, Texas	Amon G. Carter Stadium	The American; Army; Big 12; Big Ten; Mountain West
Bahamas Bowl	Nassau, Bahamas	Thomas Robinson Stadium	The American; MAC; Sun Belt
Boca Raton Bowl	Boca Raton, Florida	FAU Stadium	The American; MAC
First Responder Bowl	Dallas, Texas	Cotton Bowl	Big 12; Big Ten
Frisco Bowl	Frisco, Texas	Toyota Stadium	The American
Hawaii Bowl	Honolulu, Hawaii	Aloha Stadium	Mountain West
Independence Bowl	Shreveport, Louisiana	Independence Stadium	ACC; SEC
Miami Beach Bowl	Miami, Florida	Marlins Park	The American
New Mexico Bowl	Albuquerque, New Mexico	Dreamstyle Stadium	Mountain West
New Orleans Bowl	New Orleans, Louisiana	Mercedes-Benz Superdome	Sun Belt
Gasparilla Bowl	Tampa, Florida	Raymond James Stadium	The American

Rivalries

Current or former CUSA in-conference rivalries:

Teams		Rivalry Name	Trophy	Meetings	Record	Series Leader	Current Streak
Florida Atlantic	FIU	Shula Bowl	Don Shula Award	19	14–5	Florida Atlantic	Florida Atlantic won 4
Louisiana Tech	Southern Miss	Rivalry in Dixie	—	52	17–35	Southern Miss	Louisiana Tech won 2
Middle Tennessee	Western Kentucky	100 Miles of Hate	—	70	35–34–1	Middle Tennessee	WKU won 2
Middle Tennessee	Troy	Battle for the Palladium	The Palladium	22	13–9	Middle Tennessee	Middle Tennessee won 1
Western Kentucky	Marshall	Moonshine Throwdown	—	13	8–5	Marshall	Western Kentucky won 1

=== Men's basketball ===
For the most recent season, see 2024–25 Conference USA men's basketball season.

This list goes through the 2022–23 season.

Team	First season (Note: Reflects the calendar year in which the first season ended.)	All-time record	All-time win %	NCAA Tournament appearances (Note: Division I only.)	NCAA Tournament record	Arena	Head coach
FIU	1982	486–714	.405	1	0–1	Ocean Bank Convocation Center	Jeremy Ballard
Jacksonville State	1926	1238–884	.583	2	0–2	Pete Mathews Coliseum	Ray Harper
Liberty	1973	793–753	.513	5	1–5	Liberty Arena (Note: Liberty also schedules occasional games at the Vines Center.)	Ritchie McKay
Louisiana Tech	1910	1452–1074	.575	5	4–5	Thomas Assembly Center	Talvin Hester
Middle Tennessee	1914	1302–1133	.535	9	4–9	Murphy Center	Nick McDevitt
New Mexico State	1905	1302–1133	.535	26	11–27	Pan American Center	Jason Hooten
Sam Houston	1918	1401–1174	.544	2	0–2	Bernard Johnson Coliseum	Chris Mudge
UTEP	1915	1448–1126	.563	17	14–16	Don Haskins Center	Joe Golding
Western Kentucky	1915	1872–973	.658	23	19–24	E. A. Diddle Arena	Rick Stansbury

=== Women's basketball ===
This list goes through the 2022–23 season.

Team	First season (Note: Reflects the calendar year in which the first season ended.)	All-time record	All-time win %	NCAA Tournament appearances (Note: Division I only,)	NCAA Tournament record	Arena	Head coach
FIU	1976	758–606	.556	0	0–0	Ocean Bank Convocation Center	Jesyka Burks-Wiley
Jacksonville State	1984	519–600	.464	0	0–0	Pete Mathews Coliseum	Rick Pietri
Liberty	1976	824–547	.601	16	2–16	Liberty Arena (Note: Liberty also schedules occasional games at the Vines Center,)	Carey Green
Louisiana Tech	1975	1193–387	.755	30	65–28	Thomas Assembly Center	Brooke Stoehr
Middle Tennessee	1976	998–450	.689	20	5–20	Murphy Center	Rick Insell
New Mexico State	1983	634–572	.526	6	0–6	Pan American Center	Jody Adams-Birch
Sam Houston	1970	659–834	.441	0	0–0	Bernard Johnson Coliseum	Ravon Justice
UTEP	1975	632–716	.469	2	1–2	Don Haskins Center	Keitha Adams
Western Kentucky	1915	1070–541	.664	20	17–20	E. A. Diddle Arena	Greg Collins

== Championships ==
=== Current CUSA champions ===
"RS" is regular season, "T" is tournament.

Fall 2025

Sport	School
Football	Jacksonville State (RS); Kennesaw State (RS & Championship Game)
Soccer (W)	Liberty (RS & T); Western Kentucky (RS)
Volleyball (W)	UTEP (RS); Western Kentucky (RS & T)
Cross Country (M)	Middle Tennessee
Cross Country (W)	Liberty

Winter 2025–26

Sport	School
Basketball (M)	Liberty (RS); Kennesaw State (T)
Basketball (W)	Louisiana Tech (RS); Missouri State (T)
Bowling (W)	Jacksonville State
Indoor Track & Field (M)	Liberty
Indoor Track & Field (W)	Kennesaw State

Spring 2026

Sport	School
Baseball	Jacksonville State (RS & T)
Softball	Jacksonville State (RS & T)
Beach Volleyball (W)	Tulane (Note: No regular-season championship is awarded because teams do not play the same number of conference matches.)
Outdoor Track & Field (M)	Liberty
Outdoor Track & Field (W)	Liberty
Golf (M)	Liberty
Golf (W)	Western Kentucky
Tennis (M)	Middle Tennessee
Tennis (W)	Liberty

=== National champions ===
Only two current CUSA members, one full member and one associate, have won national team championships while representing the conference, both in bowling. Full member Jacksonville State won the 2024 NCAA championship in its first season of both varsity bowling and CUSA membership, associate member Youngstown State won the 2025 NCAA title, and Jacksonville State won the title again in 2026. The only other school to have won such a championship while a CUSA member at any level is Marshall, which moved to the Sun Belt Conference in 2022. Marshall won the 2020–21 men's soccer championship in May 2021 (with the tournament having moved from its normal schedule in fall 2020 to spring 2021 due to COVID-19).

The following current and future CUSA teams have won national championships when they were not affiliated with CUSA. Current associate members, indicated in italics, are listed with championships they won in their CUSA sports.

School	National titles	Sport	Years
Delaware	17	Equestrian	1997
Delaware	17	Figure Skating	2002, 2011, 2013, 2014, 2015, 2016
Delaware	17	Field Hockey	2016
Delaware	17	Football (Division I FCS)	2003
Delaware	17	Football (Division II)	1979
Delaware	17	Football (College Division)	1946, 1963, 1971, 1972
Delaware	17	Women's Lacrosse	1983
Delaware	17	Women's Lacrosse (AIAW Division II)	1981, 1982
FIU	2	Men's Soccer (Division II)	1982, 1984
Jacksonville State	6	Baseball (Division II)	1990, 1991
Jacksonville State	6	Men's basketball (Division II)	1985
Jacksonville State	6	Football (Division II)	1992
Jacksonville State	6	Women's gymnastics (Division II)	1984, 1985
Kennesaw State	5	Baseball (Division II)	1996
Kennesaw State	5	Men's basketball (Division II)	2004
Kennesaw State	5	Women's soccer (Division II)	2003
Kennesaw State	5	Softball (Division II)	1995, 1996
Louisiana Tech	5	Football (Division II)	1972, 1973
Louisiana Tech	5	Women's basketball	1981 (AIAW), 1982, 1988
Missouri State	3	Field hockey (AIAW Division II)	1979
Missouri State	3	Men's golf (Division II)	1983
Missouri State	3	Softball (AIAW)	1974
Sam Houston	2	Bowling	2014
Sam Houston	2	Football (Division I FCS)	2020
UTEP	21	Men's basketball	1966
UTEP	21	Men's outdoor track and field	1975, 1978, 1979, 1980, 1981, 1982
UTEP	21	Men's indoor track and field	1974, 1975, 1976, 1978, 1980, 1981, 1982
UTEP	21	Men's cross country	1969, 1975, 1976, 1978, 1979, 1980, 1981
Vanderbilt	3	Bowling	2007, 2018, 2023
Western Kentucky	1	Football (Division I FCS)	2002
Total	84		

== Facilities ==
Departing members are denoted in red.

School	Football stadium	Capacity	Basketball arena	Capacity	Baseball park	Capacity
Delaware	Delaware Stadium	18,500	Bob Carpenter Center	5,000	Bob Hannah Stadium	1,300
FIU	Pitbull Stadium	20,000	Ocean Bank Convocation Center	5,000	Infinity Insurance Park	2,000
Jacksonville State	AmFirst Stadium	22,500	Pete Mathews Coliseum	3,500	Rudy Abbott Field	1,000
Kennesaw State	Fifth Third Stadium	10,200	KSU Convocation Center	4,600	Fred Stillwell Stadium	900
Liberty	Williams Stadium	25,000	Liberty Arena (Note: Liberty also schedules basketball games at the Vines Center (capacity 9,547).)	4,000	Liberty Baseball Stadium	2,500
Middle Tennessee	Johnny "Red" Floyd Stadium	27,303	Murphy Center	11,802	Reese Smith Jr. Field	2,600
Missouri State	Robert W. Plaster Stadium	17,500	Great Southern Bank Arena	11,000	Route 66 Stadium	7,986
New Mexico State	Aggie Memorial Stadium	28,853	Pan American Center	12,482	Presley Askew Field	1,000
Sam Houston	Bowers Stadium (Note: Sam Houston schedules one nominal home game each season at NRG Stadium (capacity 72,220) in Houston.)	12,593	Bernard Johnson Coliseum	6,110	Don Sanders Stadium	1,163
Western Kentucky	Houchens Industries–L. T. Smith Stadium	23,776	E. A. Diddle Arena	7,326	Nick Denes Field	1,500

== Financials ==
=== Conference distributions ===
The following table shows Conference USA distributions during the fiscal year beginning 07-01-2024 ending 06-30-2025 as reported by ProPublica using Schedule A of the Conference USA tax filing submitted on May 14, 2026.

Institution	2024–25 Distribution
Liberty University	$5,710,256
Jacksonville State University	$4,822,948
Sam Houston State University	$4,758,258
Middle Tennessee State University	$4,609,200
Western Kentucky University	$4,482,863
Kennesaw State University	$4,480,391
New Mexico State University	$4,447,755
Florida International University	$4,442,291
Louisiana Tech University	$4,108,786
University of Texas at El Paso	$0
Average for 8 Remaining Members	$4,719,245

=== Athletic department revenue by school ===
Total revenue includes ticket sales, contributions and donations, rights and licensing, student fees, school funds and all other sources including TV income, camp income, concessions, and novelties.

Total expenses includes coach and staff salaries, scholarships, buildings and grounds, maintenance, utilities and rental fees, recruiting, team travel, equipment and uniforms, conference dues, and insurance.

The following table shows institutional reporting to the United States Department of Education as shown on the DOE Equity in Athletics website for the 2023–24 academic year.

Incoming school in light gray.

Institution	2023–24 Total Revenue from Athletics	2023–24 Total Expenses on Athletics
Liberty University	$69,076,595	$69,076,595
University of Delaware	$48,411,479	$48,411,479
Middle Tennessee State University	$43,275,343	$43,275,343
Florida International University	$41,981,914	$41,981,914
New Mexico State University	$38,923,972	$38,923,972
University of Texas at El Paso	$37,006,248	$36,602,226
Western Kentucky University	$36,875,120	$36,875,120
Kennesaw State University	$32,926,067	$32,926,067
Louisiana Tech University	$30,305,928	$30,305,928
Jacksonville State University	$29,060,404	$29,060,404
Sam Houston State University	$26,631,390	$26,567,953

== Media ==
In 2016, CUSA began a long-term television contract with lead partners ESPN and CBS Sports Network, with ESPN carrying 5 football games and the football championship game; and CBSSN carrying 6 football games, 5 basketball games, and both the men's and women's basketball championship games. CUSA also renewed and expanded its partnership with American Sports Network; owned and operated by Sinclair Broadcast Group, ASN will carry between 15 and 30 football games; between 13 and 55 men's basketball games; and between 2 and 5 women's basketball games. ASN will also carry 10 events in other C-USA sports.

The conference also entered into a contract with beIN Sports for 10 football games (marking the first domestic American football rights the network has ever acquired, and the first broadcast rights deal it had ever entered into with a college conference), 10 men's and 10 women's basketball games, 12 baseball and 12 softball games, 10 men's and 10 women's soccer games (excluding conference men's soccer games at Kentucky and South Carolina, covered by their primary conference's contract), and 10 women's volleyball games.

The total values of the 2016 contracts are notably lower than those of the previous contracts (which included Fox Sports).

Former men's soccer associate members Kentucky and South Carolina have an agreement with their primary conference for other sports to carry all home matches online through the SEC Network service. This included all of those teams' matches against CUSA opponents before the two schools moved men's soccer to the Sun Belt Conference in 2022. ESPN and the SEC Network had first rights to all CUSA home men's soccer matches featuring both schools.

In 2017 American Sports Network and Campus Insiders merged creating Stadium. Stadium's C-USA content will be available to stream on Twitter and Pluto TV. In 2017 Stadium completed a deal with Facebook to exclusively stream some C-USA football games. In 2017 CUSA entered an agreement with the streaming subscription service FloSports to stream three football games.

=== CUSA.tv ===
In 2016 CUSA partnered with SIDEARM Sports to create a subscription based streaming service named CUSA.tv. In a statement CUSA Commissioner Judy MacLeod said, "Thanks to our partnership with SIDEARM Sports, this new site showcases a clean modern look with easy access to information and we are proud to offer live content and original feature stories through our CUSA.tv." Various sports including football, basketball, and baseball will exclusively air on CUSA.tv when they are not picked up by other networks.

=== Return to ESPN and CBS Sports Network ===
In 2022, CUSA signed a new media rights agreement establishing CBS Sports Network and ESPN as primary rights holders beginning in 2023. As part of this agreement, CUSA agrees to schedule eight midweek football games per season during the month of October, to be aired on ESPN platforms including both linear ESPN channels and the ESPN+ streaming outlet. CBS Sports Network continues with tier 1 selection status for CUSA football and men's basketball.

== Academics ==
A majority of the Conference's members are ranked as Tier One National Universities in U.S. News & World Report's 2025 Best Colleges rankings.

Of the incoming members:

- Delaware is in the Carnegie Foundation's "very high research activity" classification, and tied for #76 in US News' "National Universities" classification.
- Jacksonville State is in the Carnegie Foundation's "Master's Colleges and Universities (Larger Programs)" classification, and is not ranked by US News as a national university, instead being classified as a Southern "Regional University".
- Kennesaw State is in the Carnegie Foundation's "high research activity" classification, and ranked between 331 and 440 in US News' "National Universities" classification.
- Liberty is in the Carnegie Foundation's "Doctoral/Professional" classification, and also ranked between 331 and 440 in US News' "National Universities" classification.
- New Mexico State is in the Carnegie Foundation's "high research activity" classification, and tied for #263 in US News' "National Universities" classification.
- Sam Houston is in the Carnegie Foundation's "high research activity" classification, and also in a tie for #263 in US News' "National Universities" classification.

University	Affiliation	Carnegie	Endowment	US News	Forbes
Florida International University	Public (SUSF)	Research (Very High)	$230,954,000	162	145
Louisiana Tech University	Public (UL System)	Research (High)	N/A (Note: Louisiana Tech and UTEP did not participate in the 2013 NACUBO Endowment Study.)	277	494
Middle Tennessee State University	Public (TBR)	Doctoral/Professional	$75,710,000	288	362
University of Texas at El Paso	Public (UT System)	Research (Very High)	N/A	RNP (Note: In the 2022 US News national university rankings, UTEP and Western Kentucky are listed as Rank Not Published (RNP), otherwise known as Tier Two.)	547
Western Kentucky University	Public	Doctoral/Professional	$118,396,000	RNP	521
