= Del Bausch =

American politician

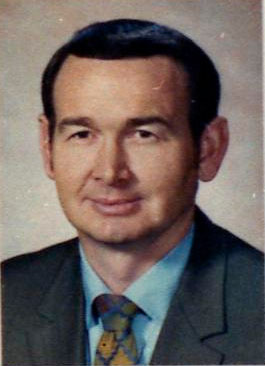
- Bausch in 1973

Member of the Washington Senate from the 22nd district
- In office January 10, 1977 – January 12, 1981
- Preceded by: Harry B. Lewis
- Succeeded by: Dick Hemstad

Member of the Washington House of Representatives from the 22nd district
- In office January 8, 1973 – January 10, 1977
- Preceded by: Harold E. "Hal" Wolf
- Succeeded by: Mike Kreidler

Personal details
- Born: 1935 (age 90–91) Olympia, Washington, U.S.
- Party: Democratic
- Occupation: safety engineer

Delone Bausch (born 1935) is an American former politician in the state of Washington. He served in the Washington House of Representatives and Washington State Senate as a Democrat from 1973 to 1981.
