= Robert Lee Barker =

American therapist and academic (born 1937)

Robert Lee Barker (born July 19, 1937) is an American psychotherapist, author, editor, and professor of social work. He is most noted as the creator and author of The Social Work Dictionary through its first five editions and has written 20 other textbooks in the fields of family therapy, behavioral dysfunctions, and legal-social issues. He was an early advocate and systematizer for the case management approach to delivering social services, for private practice in social work, and for the emerging field of forensic social work.

== Biography ==
Robert Lee Barker was born July 19, 1937, in Tacoma, Washington, the oldest of four children. His mother worked as a waitress and his stepfather was a prison guard. During college and graduate school he worked in a variety of blue-collar jobs in canneries and paper mills. In one of those jobs, he was employed in a Veteran's Administration hospital as a psychiatric aide, which inspired his interest in working with people with mental and behavioral distresses. He graduated in 1959 from the University of Puget Sound in Tacoma, majoring in sociology and psychology before earning his Master of Social Work (MSW) from the University of Washington in Seattle.

In 1961 he became a 2nd lieutenant in the U.S. Air Force where he worked as a social work officer at Travis Air Force Base. He was a founder and first president of the Air Force Social Workers Association. The organization later published Barker's pamphlet, “Careers In Air Force Social Work.” In 1969 he completed his military service at Andrews Air Force Base in Washington, D.C., attaining the rank of major. As part of his military duties in the hospital department of psychiatry, he had to personally inform hundreds of families of Vietnam casualties of the deaths of their loved ones.

Under an Air Force Institute of Technology scholarship he attended Columbia University in New York to earn his PhD, where his mentors included Robert K. Merton, Richard A. Cloward, Eveline M. Burns, and Florence Hollis. In his doctoral dissertation research he studied personnel patterns in mental hospitals. This work led to a grant from the U.S. Veterans Administration to determine how to utilize social work personnel more efficiently. His dissertation work led to his first published book, Differential Use of Social Work Manpower. In collaboration with Professor Thomas L. Briggs of Syracuse University, Barker wrote a series of books and monographs to deal with shortages in mental health personnel through more efficient intervention strategies, including teamwork and case management approaches.

In 1969 Barker co-founded, with psychiatrist-psychoanalyst Karl D. Hawver M.D., the Potomac Psychiatric Center in the Washington, D.C., suburbs. The clinic focused on treating individuals and families with mental health problems and family relationship issues. Barker specialized in family therapy, couples therapy, and group psychotherapy. In the clinic's Capitol Hill office in Washington, Barker treated the families of many U.S. Members of Congress and other government officials.

In 1979, Barker joined the faculty of The Catholic University of America, where he taught master's and doctoral students and guided their dissertation researches. During this time he wrote over 100 articles in professional journals, created and edited the Journal of Independent Social Work from 1986 to 1991, and produced textbooks on couples therapy. He was consultant to the Ladies Home Journal column “Can This Marriage Be Saved” in 1987 through 1989 and its counselor-expert. He wrote a best selling book “The Green Eyed Marriage” which led to his conducting a series of workshops for people and their families with jealousy problems. Together with faculty at Catholic University he helped establish two new schools of social work in Santiago and Valparaíso, Chile, and he taught courses at the Escuela de Trabajo Social at the Pontificia Universidad Católica de Valparaíso for three years beginning in 1988.

Since 1990 he has focused his career to the development of The Social Work Dictionary and other publications. He has also worked extensively as a consultant to organizations that write questions for professional state licensing boards, to testifying in courtrooms about family and custody issues, and as a researcher and advocate for homeless persons.

Barker is married to Dr. Mary Elizabeth Donovan, formerly of the education faculty at the University of Puget Sound. They have three sons and one daughter.

== Case management innovations ==
Early in Barker's career in the 1960s, President Lyndon Johnson's Great Society programs necessitated tremendous increases in the numbers of social service and mental health workers. The National Association of Social Workers (NASW) was awarded grants from government agencies to help find ways to remedy these shortages. Barker and Thomas Briggs were employed to conduct and administer these studies. They observed numerous state and federal institutions and experimented with different ways staff members could help hospitalized clients and their families. The Barker-Briggs model of using teams to provide these services was later used as a template for case management approaches is still used by the U.S. Department of Veterans Affairs, known as the Veteran's Administration at the time, and by many state mental hospital staffing patterns. As originated, the model replaced the primary one-on-one relationship between client and helping professional with a team approach. The leader of the team, usually a professional social worker or registered nurse assigned specific tasks to a staff of several ancillary workers. The ancillary workers were experts in their own right at providing for the specific needs of the client. For example, one worker could specialize in helping clients get jobs, or helping clients access post-discharge resources in the community. The implication was that such clients needed help not only with psychotherapy or counseling but with life-skills problems, and when met, the client's psychotherapy goals were achieved more efficiently and effectively.

== Private practice ==
Members of the social work profession have debated for decades about whether its mission is compatible with private practice. Opponents of private practice argue that social workers should only be employed by governmental agencies or charitable organizations, and deal primarily with clients who are economically disadvantaged. When Barker established his clinic in 1969 almost all of his social colleagues were employed by charity oriented. He conducted workshops in private practice and a series of debates with social work advocates of the agency based model. Eventually, more social workers entered private practice and it has become one of the primary ways these professionals are now employed.

== Crisis intervention theory in couples therapy ==
When Barker left the military to establish his private practice he had been greatly influenced by the studies of Vietnam War veterans who suffered Post Traumatic Stress Disorder (PTSD) and related works about crisis intervention with PTSD victims. He concluded that, while the severity of the trauma in Vietnam might be greater, the crisis facing dysfunctional family members could have similar consequences and might benefit from similar intervention strategies. He conducted a series of systematic research studies with such family members and, with several colleagues used an adapted version of the crisis intervention PTSD model to treat troubled families. Treating Couples In Crisis, has been subsequently used as an instructional textbook for graduate students in marital therapy classes.

== The Social Work Dictionary ==
In the early 1980s Barker served on several panels of social work experts who wrote the questions and answers for the state licensing board examinations. Many of these panels resulted in disagreements about what social workers actually mean when they use their unique terminology. The researchers who conducted these panels wondered why the social work profession could not resolve disputes simply by consulting the dictionaries of their profession's nomenclature. However, up to that point, the social work profession did not have such a dictionary and had never developed one of its own. With most of the states in the process of developing professional licensing boards for social workers for the first time, the need for a uniform professional nomenclature and glossary became urgent.

With the help of the National Association of Social Workers, the major association of the profession, Barker called on hundreds of experts in the field and in related disciplines, to assist his efforts to create a dictionary. Barker developed the list of the terms to be included in the Dictionary by reviewing the indexes of all the textbooks and journals used in the profession, and in related professions such as psychology, psychiatry, economics, administration, medicine, and other fields. He then wrote succinct definitions for several thousand terms from this list. A selection of these definitions was submitted to experts for corrections and clarifications. Eventually every term and definition had been reviewed by at least three experts before a final definition was established. Before publication, each of these definitions was reviewed for clarity and comprehensibility by graduate students in several of the schools of social work in the Washington, D.C. area.

The result was the original social work dictionary, first published by NASW in 1987 with about 4,000 terms defined. With each revision, in 1991, 1995, 1999, and 2003 about 2000 additional definitions were added; the current edition has nearly 10,000 definitions in 493 pages. The dictionary also contains thousands of acronyms commonly used in the profession, and a timeline of the historical events in the development of the profession.

The dictionary is now a standard reference resource in the profession. Katherine Van Wormer called it "a landmark in the continuing professionalization of social work—the development of a distinctive and unique vocabulary and the development of consensus by social work consultants (scholars and practitioners) on key terms."

== Homeless advocacy ==
Perhaps because of his own humble origins, Barker has always had a strong interest in the problems of homelessness. His close friendship and work with the famous urban anthropologist Elliot Liebow, author of “Tally’s Corner” and “Tell Them Who I Am: The Lives of Homeless Women,” motivated him to speak and write about problems of the homeless. In 1989 he devoted several months to living as a homeless person in several cities throughout the United States. He conducted extensive interviews with “other” homeless persons, and sent the findings by mail to Liebow. These correspondences formed the basis of a series of lectures about homelessness given by Liebow and Barker to various government agencies, universities, and civic groups.

== Forensic social work ==
After Barker retired from The Catholic University to devote more time to the dictionary and to homeless advocacy, he testified as an expert witness in courtroom trials, primarily involved in family dissolution disputes and custody issues. He conducted workshops for social workers on how to prepare for courtroom testimony and to conduct forensic investigations to be used in legal proceedings. He developed a curriculum for universities for a new specialty, forensic social work, and with lawyer Douglas Branson of the University of Pittsburgh School of Law, published the first text on the subject, “Forensic Social Work”, now in its second edition. This text is now used in many schools of social work for their courses on forensics and legal issues.
