= Paul W. Bryant Jr. =

American banker, investor, and philanthropist

Paul William Bryant Jr.
- Born: c. 1945
- Education: University of Alabama
- Occupations: Banker, investor
- Children: 3 daughters
- Parent: Bear Bryant

Paul William Bryant Jr. (born c. 1945) is an American banker and investor from Alabama.

== Early life and family background ==
Paul William Bryant Jr. was born circa 1945. His father, Bear Bryant, was an American football player and coach.

Bryant graduated from the University of Alabama in Tuscaloosa, Alabama with a degree in Commerce in 1966.

== Career ==
Bryant founded the People's Bank in the late 1960s, and later sold it. He also served as general manager of minor league baseball's Birmingham Barons. By 1977, he established GreeneTrack, dog racing track located in Greene County, Alabama, with A. Wayne May, a veterinarian, and Sam Phelps, a lawyer. He went on to establish more tracks in Texas (for example in La Marque, Texas), Idaho, and Iowa. By 1995, they were incorporated as GreenTrack, Inc. As of 2009, he owned 72% of GreenTrack. Bryant is also the President of Greene County Greyhound Park. He also serves as the President of Green Group, Inc.

Bryant invests in "dog and horse racing, the insurance industry, cement making, catfish farming and banking." He is worth "hundreds of millions of dollars." In 1995, Bryant acquired Reynolds Ready Mix, a cement company later renamed Ready Mix USA. By 2011, he sold it to Cemex, a Mexican construction corporation, for US$350 million. In 1999, he acquired a stake in Harvest Select Catfish Inc., a company which raises catfish in Alabama and Mississippi. He was also the co-founder of Alabama Reassurance Co., later known as Alabama Life Reinsurance Co., a reinsurance company.

In 2005, Bryant founded the Bryant Bank. He serves as its chairman.

He co-authored two books about American football in 2013.

== Controversy ==
He has donated millions of dollars to the Alabama Crimson Tide football program. A CBS story from December 2014 reported that Bryant Jr. was partially responsible for shuttering the UAB Football program, reportedly over a long-standing grudge with Gene Bartow over a 1991 letter to the NCAA - and "out of fear it might one day challenge" the football program his father had built.

For many years, Bryant has been accused of running the Alabama board of trustees like a family business, "holding secret meetings, shrugging off public records requests, ignoring or sidestepping the law." In 2001, a committee of trustees met in secret, just one day after a court barred Auburn's board of trustees from doing the same thing. As of 2015, seven trustees were executives or directors at Bryant Bank. These ties received national press attention when the board of trustees made the shocking decision to kill UAB football.

Bryant Jr. also has clear ties to a federal insurance fraud case that drew a 15-year prison sentence for Allen W. Stewart. Stewart was found guilty on all 135 counts of fraud. One of Bryant's companies, Alabama Reassurance or "Alabama Re", was implicated in at least nine counts of the Stewart indictment, relating to a "wire fraud scheme to deceive state insurance regulators involving reinsurance." According to the state Department of Insurance, Alabama Re had $240 million in admitted assets, a five person board headed by Bryant, and just two full-time employees.

== Personal life ==
He was married, and had three daughters. He was described by The Birmingham News as "among the most private of men, largely a mystery to many."

Bryant served as the chairman of the Civil War Trust. He also served on the boards of trustees of the Alabama Heritage Foundation and the Museum of the Confederacy in Richmond, Virginia.

He served on the board of trustees of the University of Alabama until September 2015 and previously served as its chairman. In March 2015, The Birmingham News revealed that many UA trustees worked or had relatives who worked for the Bryant Bank.

== Honors ==
Bryant was inducted into the 2023 class of the 1831 Society, which is bestowed on individuals who have given $5 million or more and "changed the trajectory" of The University of Alabama.

== Bibliography ==
- When Winning Was Everything: Alabama Football Players in World War II (with Delbert Reed, Paul W. Bryant Museum, 2013).
- University of Alabama: The Complete History of Crimson Tide Football (with Joe Namath, Nick Saban, Bill Battle, Gene Stallings, Ozzie Newsome, John Hannah, Murray Legg, Van Tiffin, Kermit Kendrick, John Mangum, Phillip Doyle, Bill Oliver, Shaun Alexander, Harry Gilmer, Cecil Ingram, Don Salls, Skybox Press, 2013).
