= Zelda Zabinsky =

American industrial engineer and operations researcher

- Born: Zelda Barbara Zabinsky
- Education: University of Puget Sound (BS, 1977); University of Michigan (MS, 1984; PhD, 1985)
- Known for: Global optimization, Stochastic programming, Composite structures design
- Title: Professor Emeritus
- Awards: INFORMS Fellow (2019); IISE Fellow (2009)
- Scientific career
- Fields: Industrial engineering, Operations research
- Workplaces: University of Washington
- Doctoral advisor: Robert L. Smith

Zelda Barbara Zabinsky is an industrial engineer and operations researcher specializing in the application of global optimization to logistics. She is a professor of industrial engineering at the University of Washington, where she also holds adjunct positions in electrical engineering, mechanical engineering, and civil and environmental engineering.

== Education and career ==
Zabinsky did her undergraduate studies at the University of Puget Sound, majoring in mathematics with a minor in biology. Her interests from this time include optimization of transportation as well as predator-prey dynamics. After graduating, she worked at the National Marine Fisheries Service and Boeing before following her husband to Ann Arbor, Michigan, where she worked on applications of operations of research to health care at Vector Research, now part of the Altarum Institute. She completed her PhD in industrial and operations engineering at the University of Michigan. Her 1985 dissertation, Computational Complexity of Adaptive Algorithms in Monte Carlo Optimization, was supervised by Robert L. Smith. She joined the University of Washington faculty in 1985.

In September 2022, the University of Washington ISE Department celebrated her retirement, transitioning her to Professor Emeritus. Despite emeritus status, she remains active in the research community, presenting on Scalable Black-box Global Optimization at various seminars throughout 2024.

== Book ==
Zabinsky is the author of the book Stochastic Adaptive Search in Global Optimization (Kluwer, 2004).

== Recognition ==
Zabinsky is a Fellow of the Institute of Industrial and Systems Engineers, elected in 2009. She was elected to the 2019 class of Fellows of the Institute for Operations Research and the Management Sciences, for "fundamental contributions in developing theory and algorithms for global optimization, with significant applications in engineering design, health care, and numerous other fields, and substantial impacts in education and service".
