= 2008 NORCECA Beach Volleyball Circuit (Guatemala) =

Tournament details
- Host country: Guatemala
- Dates: April 16–21, 2008
- Teams: 32
- Venue: Guatemala City (in Guatemala City host cities)

The 2008 NORCECA Beach Volleyball Circuit at Guatemala was held April 16–21, 2008 in Guatemala City, Guatemala. It was the second leg of the NORCECA Beach Volleyball Circuit 2008.

== Women's competition ==
RANK	FINAL RANKING	EARNINGS	POINTS
1st place, gold medalist(s)	Candelas - García (MEX)	US$1,500.00	200
2nd place, silver medalist(s)	Canet - Sinal (CUB)	US$1,000.00	180
3rd place, bronze medalist(s)	López - Ramos (PUR)	US$750.00	160
4.	Estrada - Reyes (MEX)	US$550.00	140
5.	Orellana - Ramírez (GUA)	US$400.00	110
6.	Recinos - Alvarado (GUA)	US$400.00	100
7.	Thomas - Long (CAN)	US$200.00	80
8.	Masler - Madden (USA)	US$200.00	70
9.	González - Díaz (GUA)		55
10.	Traña - Guandique (NCA)		45
11.	Valverde - Mora (CRC)		35
12.	Larios - Soler (ESA)		25
13.	Molina - Soler (ESA)		15
14.	Dyer - Carmona (SKN)		10
15.	Beckles - Gloud (TTO)		5

== Men's competition ==
RANK	FINAL RANKING	EARNINGS	POINTS
1st place, gold medalist(s)	Virgen - Miramontes (MEX)	US$1,500.00	200
2nd place, silver medalist(s)	Kindelán - Munder (CUB)	US$1,000.00	180
3rd place, bronze medalist(s)	Irrizarry - Rodríguez (PUR)	US$750.00	160
4.	Calderon - Castro (NCA)	US$550.00	140
5.	Pérez - Vargas (DOM)	US$400.00	110
6.	Madden - Gregan (USA)	US$400.00	100
7.	Ozuna - Pineda (GUA)	US$200.00	80
8.	López - Suárez (CRC)	US$200.00	70
9.	Medrano - Vargas (ESA)		55
10.	Espinoza - Sandoval (CRC)		45
11.	Bolaños - Garrido (GUA)		35
12.	(25x17px)		25
13.	Collins - Percival (SKN)		15
14.	Robles - Petrona (ARU)		10
15.	Vega - Serrano (HON)		5
16.	Charles - Dennis (TTO)		1
17.	Lewis - Wilson (JAM)		0
