= Beach volleyball at the Pan American Games =

- No. of events: 2 (men: 1; women: 1)

Beach volleyball was introduced at the 1999 Pan American Games in Winnipeg, Manitoba, Canada, three years after the 1996 Summer Olympics, when the sport made its Olympic debut.

== Men's tournament ==
=== Results summary ===
Year	Host	Gold medal match			Bronze medal match			Teams
Year	Host	Gold medalists	Score	Silver medalists	Bronze medalists	Score	4th place	Teams
1999; Details	(Canada); Winnipeg	(Canada); Jody Holden and Conrad Leinemann	—	(Brazil); Lula Barbosa and Adriano Garrido	(Brazil); Roberto Lopes da Costa and Franco Neto	—	(Cuba); Ihosvany Chambers and Lazaro Milian Carvajal	12
2003; Details	(Dominican Republic); Santo Domingo	(Cuba); Francisco Álvarez and Juan Rossell	—	(Brazil); Luizão Corrêa and Paulo Emilio Silva	(Puerto Rico); Ramón Hernández and Raúl Papaleo	—	(United States); David Fischer and Brad Torsone	17
2007; Details	(Brazil); Rio de Janeiro	(Brazil); Emanuel Rego and Ricardo Santos	—	(United States); Ty Loomis and Hans Stolfus	(Cuba); Francisco Álvarez and Leonel Munder	—	(Canada); Jason Kruger and Wes Montgomery	16
2011; Details	(Mexico); Guadalajara	(Brazil); Alison Cerutti and Emanuel Rego	2–0	(Venezuela); Igor Hernández and Farid Mussa	(Argentina); Santiago Etchegaray and Pablo Suárez	2–1	(Mexico); Aldo Miramontes and Juan Virgen	16
2015; Details	(Canada); Toronto	(Mexico); Rodolfo Ontiveros and Juan Virgen	2–1	(Brazil); Vitor Araujo and Álvaro Morais Filho	(Cuba); Nivaldo Díaz and Sergio González	2–1	(Chile); Esteban Grimalt and Marco Grimalt	16
2019; Details	(Peru); Lima	(Chile); Marco Grimalt and Esteban Grimalt	2–1	(Mexico); Rodolfo Ontiveros and Juan Virgen	(Argentina); Nicolás Capogrosso and Julian Azaad	2–0	(Canada); Aaron Nusbaum and Michael Plantinga	16
2023; Details	(Chile); Santiago	(Brazil); André Stein and George Wanderley	2–1	(Cuba); Jorge Alayo and Noslen Díaz	(Chile); Marco Grimalt and Esteban Grimalt	2–1	(United States); Logan Webber and Hagen Smith	16

=== Participating nations ===
Legend

- 1st – Champions
- 2nd – Runners-up
- 3rd – Third place
- 4th – Fourth place
- • – Did not enter / Did not qualify
- – Hosts
- = – More than one team tied for that rank
- Q – Qualified for forthcoming tournament

Nation	(Canada); 1999 (12)	(Dominican Republic); 2003 (17)	(Brazil); 2007 (16)	(Mexico); 2011 (16)	(Canada); 2015 (16)	(Peru); 2019 (16)	(Chile); 2023 (16)	Years
Argentina	•	•	= 9th	3rd	6th	3rd	8th	4
Aruba	•	•	•	•	15th	•	•	1
Bolivia	•	= 9th	•	•	•	•	12th	2
Brazil	2nd	2nd	1st	1st	2nd	7th	1st	7
Brazil	3rd	•	•	•	•	•	•	7
Canada	1st	= 5th	4th	= 9th	8th	4th	5th	7
Canada	= 7th	•	•	•	•	•	•	7
Cayman Islands	•	= 13th	•	•	•	•	•	1
Chile	•	•	= 9th	= 9th	4th	1st	3rd	5
Colombia	•	•	= 13th	•	•	•	10th	2
Costa Rica	= 10th	= 9th	= 5th	= 13th	•	14th	16th	6
Cuba	4th	1st	3rd	= 5th	3rd	5th	2nd	7
Dominican Republic	•	= 5th	•	= 9th	•	10th	•	3
Ecuador	•	= 13th	= 13th	•	•	•	7th	3
El Salvador	•	= 5th	= 9th	= 13th	13th	11th	14th	6
Guatemala	•	17th	= 13th	= 5th	16th	9th	•	5
Honduras	= 10th	•	•	•	•	•	•	1
Independent Athletes Team	•	•	•	•	•	•	15th	1
Jamaica	•	•	•	= 13th	•	•	•	1
Mexico	= 5th	= 5th	= 5th	4th	1st	2nd	6th	7
Netherlands Antilles	= 10th	= 9th	•	•	•	•	•	2
Nicaragua	•	•	= 13th	= 13th	12th	13th	13th	5
Paraguay	•	= 9th	•	•	•	•	11th	2
Peru	•	•	•	•	•	16th	•	1
Puerto Rico	= 5th	3rd	= 5th	= 9th	7th	•	•	5
Saint Lucia	•	•	•	•	14th	•	•	1
Trinidad and Tobago	•	= 13th	•	•	9th	15th	•	3
Uruguay	•	= 13th	= 5th	= 5th	5th	6th	9th	6
United States	= 7th	4th	2nd	= 5th	11th	10th	4th	7
United States	= 7th	•	•	•	•	•	•	7
Venezuela	•	•	= 9th	2nd	10th	8th	•	4
Total	9	17	16	16	16	16	16	27

== Women's tournament ==
=== Results summary ===
Year	Host	Gold medal match			Bronze medal match			Teams
Year	Host	Gold medalists	Score	Silver medalists	Bronze medalists	Score	4th place	Teams
1999; Details	(Canada); Winnipeg	(Brazil); Adriana Behar and Shelda Bede	—	(United States); Jenny Pavley and Marsha Miller	(Mexico); Laura Almaral and Mayra Huerta	—	(Canada); Barb Broen-Ouelette and Christine Pack	12
2003; Details	(Dominican Republic); Santo Domingo	(Cuba); Dalixia Fernández and Tamara Larrea	—	(Mexico); Mayra García and Hilda Gaxiola	(Brazil); Ana Richa and Larissa França	—	(Canada); Nancy Gougeon and Wanda Guenette	13
2007; Details	(Brazil); Rio de Janeiro	(Brazil); Juliana Silva and Larissa França	—	(Cuba); Dalixia Fernández and Tamara Larrea	(Mexico); Bibiana Candelas and Mayra García	—	(Canada); Marie-Andrée Lessard and Sarah Maxwell	16
2011; Details	(Mexico); Guadalajara	(Brazil); Juliana Silva and Larissa França	2–1	(Mexico); Bibiana Candelas and Mayra García	(Puerto Rico); Yarleen Santiago and Yamileska Yantín	2–1	(United States); Emily Day and Heather Hughes	16
2015; Details	(Canada); Toronto	(Argentina); Ana Gallay and Georgina Klug	2–1	(Cuba); Lianma Flores and Leila Martínez	(Brazil); Carolina Horta and Liliane Maestrini	2–0	(Canada); Melissa Humana-Paredes and Taylor Pischke	16
2019; Details	(Peru); Lima	(United States); Karissa Cook and Jace Pardon	2–1	(Argentina); Ana Gallay and Fernanda Pereyra	(Brazil); Carolina Horta and Ângela Lavalle	2–0	(Cuba); Maylen Delís and Leila Martínez	16
2023; Details	(Chile); Santiago	(Brazil); Ana Patrícia Ramos and Eduarda Lisboa	2–0	(Canada); Melissa Humana-Paredes and Brandie Wilkerson	(United States); Corinne Quiggle and Sarah Murphy	2–0	(Argentina); Ana Gallay and Fernanda Pereyra	16

=== Participating nations ===
Legend

- 1st – Champions
- 2nd – Runners-up
- 3rd – Third place
- 4th – Fourth place
- • – Did not enter / Did not qualify
- – Hosts
- = – More than one team tied for that rank
- Q – Qualified for forthcoming tournament

Nation	(Canada); 1999 (12)	(Dominican Republic); 2003 (13)	(Brazil); 2007 (16)	(Mexico); 2011 (16)	(Canada); 2015 (16)	(Peru); 2019 (16)	(Chile); 2023 (16)	Years
Antigua and Barbuda	•	= 9th	•	•	•	•	•	1
Argentina	•	•	= 13th	= 9th	1st	2nd	4th	5
Aruba	•	= 9th	•	•	•	•	•	1
Bolivia	•	13th	•	•	•	•	•	1
Brazil	1st	3rd	1st	1st	3rd	3rd	1st	7
Brazil	= 5th	•	•	•	•	•	•	7
Canada	4th	4th	4th	= 5th	4th	9th	2nd	7
Canada	= 10th	•	•	•	•	•	•	7
Cayman Islands	•	•	•	•	16th	•	•	1
Chile	•	= 5th	•	= 13th	10th	6th	8th	5
Colombia	•	•	= 5th	= 5th	6th	5th	10th	5
Costa Rica	•	= 5th	= 9th	= 9th	8th	8th	13th	6
Cuba	= 7th	1st	2nd	= 5th	2nd	4th	•	6
Cuba	= 7th	•	•	•	•	•	•	6
Dominican Republic	•	= 9th	•	•	•	•	9th	2
Ecuador	•	•	= 5th	= 9th	•	•	12th	3
El Salvador	= 10th	•	= 9th	= 13th	11th	13th	16th	6
Guatemala	•	= 5th	= 9th	= 9th	13th	15th	•	5
Honduras	= 7th	•	•	•	•	•	•	1
Independent Athletes Team	•	•	•	•	•	•	14th	1
Mexico	3rd	2nd	3rd	2nd	9th	11th	5th	7
Nicaragua	•	•	= 9th	= 13th	15th	12th	•	4
Paraguay	•	•	•	•	•	7th	11th	2
Peru	•	•	•	•	•	10th	6th	2
Puerto Rico	•	•	= 13th	3rd	12th	•	7th	4
Trinidad and Tobago	•	•	= 13th	= 13th	14th	14th	•	4
Uruguay	•	= 9th	= 5th	= 5th	7th	•	15th	5
United States	2nd	= 5th	= 5th	4th	5th	1st	3rd	7
United States	= 5th	•	•	•	•	•	•	7
Venezuela	= 10th	•	= 13th	•	•	•	•	2
Virgin Islands	•	•	•	•	•	16th	•	1
Total	8	13	16	16	16	16	16	27

== Medal table ==
As of the 2023 Pan American Games.

=== Combined total ===
Rank	Nation	Gold	Silver	Bronze	Total
1	Brazil	7	3	4	14
2	Cuba	2	3	2	7
3	Mexico	1	3	2	6
4	United States	1	2	1	4
5	Argentina	1	1	2	4
6	Canada	1	1	0	2
7	Chile	1	0	1	2
8	Venezuela	0	1	0	1
9	Puerto Rico	0	0	2	2
Totals (9 entries)		14	14	14	42

=== Men's total ===
Rank	Nation	Gold	Silver	Bronze	Total
1	Brazil	3	3	1	7
2	Cuba	1	1	2	4
3	Mexico	1	1	0	2
4	Chile	1	0	1	2
5	Canada	1	0	0	1
6	United States	0	1	0	1
6	Venezuela	0	1	0	1
8	Argentina	0	0	2	2
9	Puerto Rico	0	0	1	1
Totals (9 entries)		7	7	7	21

=== Women's total ===
Rank	Nation	Gold	Silver	Bronze	Total
1	Brazil	4	0	3	7
2	Cuba	1	2	0	3
3	United States	1	1	1	3
4	Argentina	1	1	0	2
5	Mexico	0	2	2	4
6	Canada	0	1	0	1
7	Puerto Rico	0	0	1	1
Totals (7 entries)		7	7	7	21
