= 2009 NORCECA Beach Volleyball Circuit (Puerto Vallarta) =

Tournament details
- Host country: Mexico
- Dates: October 9–11, 2009
- Teams: 25
- Venue: Unidad Agustin Flores Contreras (in Puerto Vallarta host cities)

The 2009 NORCECA Beach Volleyball Circuit at Puerto Vallarta, was held October 9–11, 2009 in Puerto Vallarta, Mexico. It was the seventh leg of the NORCECA Beach Volleyball Circuit 2009.

== Women's competition ==
RANK	FINAL RANKING	EARNINGS	POINTS
1st place, gold medalist(s)	Candelas - García (MEX)	US$1,700.00	200
2nd place, silver medalist(s)	Canet - Crespo (CUB)	US$1,000.00	180
3rd place, bronze medalist(s)	Maloney - Broder (CAN)	US$750.00	160
4.	Estrada - Revuelta (MEX)	US$500.00	140
5.	Santiago - Acevedo (PUR)	US$400.00	110
6.	Reyes - Herrera (MEX)	US$300.00	100
7.	Batt - Wallin (USA)	US$200.00	80
8.	Virgen - Cruz (MEX)	US$150.00	70
9.	Molina - Soler (ESA)		55
10.	Orellana - Ramírez (GUA)		45
11.	Fonseca - Alfaro (CRC)		35
12.	Hamilton - Mann (LCA)		25

== Men's competition ==
Results on October 11, 2009

RANK	FINAL RANKING	EARNINGS	POINTS
1st place, gold medalist(s)	Kindelán - Ramírez (CUB)	US$1,700.00	200
2nd place, silver medalist(s)	Binstock - Zbyszewski (CAN)	US$1,000.00	180
3rd place, bronze medalist(s)	Reader - Sewell (CAN)	US$750.00	160
4.	Virgen - Miramontes (MEX)	US$500.00	140
5.	Irrizarry - Rodríguez (PUR)	US$400.00	110
6.	Burnham - Jagoda (USA)	US$300.00	100
7.	Bolaños - Garrido (GUA)	US$200.00	80
8.	González - Colosio (MEX)	US$150.00	70
9.	Ontiveros - Ontiveros (MEX)		55
10.	Calderón - López (NCA)		45
11.	William - Clercent (LCA)		35
12.	Medrano - Vargas (ESA)		25
13.	Frias - Hernández (MEX)		15

== See also ==
- NORCECA Beach Volleyball Circuit 2009
