= Beach volleyball at the Central American and Caribbean Games =

Volleyball

Beach volleyball was introduced at the 1998 Central American and Caribbean Games in Maracaibo, Venezuela.

== Men's Medalists ==
Men's Beach Volleyball at the Central American and Caribbean Games
Year	Host	Gold Medal	Silver Medal	Bronze Medal
1998; Details	Maracaibo, Venezuela	Juan Rossell and Ihosvany Chambers (CUB)	Alfonso Jackson and Yoel Sotelo (MEX)	William De Jesús and Amaury Velasco (PUR)
2002; Details	San Salvador, El Salvador	Ramón Hernández and Raúl Papaleo (PUR)	Juan Rodríguez and Tomás Hernández (MEX)	José Vásquez and Ricardo Rodríguez (VEN)
2006; Details	Cartagena, Colombia	Francisco Álvarez and Wilfredo Villar (CUB)	Jackson Henríquez and Igor Hernández (VEN)	Ulises Ontiveros and Lombardo Ontiveros (CUB)
2010; Details	Cabo Rojo, Puerto Rico	Igor Hernández and Jesus Villafañe (VEN)	Aldo Miramontes and Juan Virgen (MEX)	Orlando Irizarry and Roberto Rodríguez (PUR)
2023; Details	San Salvador, El Salvador	Juan Virgen and Miguel Sarabia (MEX)	Jefferson Cascante and Rubén Mora (NCA)	Noslen Díaz and Jorge Alayo (CUB)

== Women's Medalists ==
Women's Beach Volleyball at the Central American and Caribbean Games
Year	Host	Gold Medal	Silver Medal	Bronze Medal
1998; Details	Maracaibo, Venezuela	Laura Almaral and Mayra Huerta (MEX)	Mayra Ferrer and Noemí Blanco (CUB)	Yadeizi Abreu and Nelitza Zambrano (VEN)
2002; Details	San Salvador, El Salvador	Mayra García and Hilda Gaxiola (MEX)	Frankelina Rodríguez and Milagos Cova (VEN)	Yudelka Bonilla and Iris Santos (DOM)
2006; Details	Cartagena, Colombia	Dalixia Fernández and Tamara Larrea (CUB)	Vanessa Virgen and Martha Revuelta (MEX)	Frankelina Rodríguez and Alejandra García (VEN)
2010; Details	Cabo Rojo, Puerto Rico	Bibiana Candelas and Mayra García (MEX)	Dariam Acevedo and Yarleen Santiago (PUR)	Andrea Galindo and Claudia Galindo (COL)
2023; Details	San Salvador, El Salvador	Maria González and Allanis Navas (PUR)	Bethania Almánzar and Julibeth Payano (DOM)	Abril Flores and Atenas Gutiérrez (MEX)

== See also ==
- Volleyball at the Central American and Caribbean Games
