= 2009 NORCECA Beach Volleyball Circuit (Manzanillo) =

Tournament details
- Host country: Mexico
- Dates: October 2–4, 2009
- Teams: 29
- Venue: Club Maeva (in Manzanillo host cities)

The 2009 NORCECA Beach Volleyball Circuit at Manzanillo was held October 2 through October 4, 2009, in Manzanillo, Mexico. It was the sixth leg of the NORCECA Beach Volleyball Circuit 2009. The tournament was dedicated to the memory of Alejandro Salinas de la Garza, the late president of the Mexican National Volleyball Federation.

== Women's competition ==
RANK	FINAL RANKING	EARNINGS	POINTS
1st place, gold medalist(s)	Canet - Crespo (CUB)	US$1,700.00	200
2nd place, silver medalist(s)	Estrada - Revuelta (MEX)	US$1,000.00	180
3rd place, bronze medalist(s)	Van Fleet - Smith (USA)	US$750.00	160
4.	Thomas - Broder (CAN)	US$500.00	140
5.	Molina - Soler (ESA)	US$400.00	110
6.	Santiago - Acevedo (PUR)	US$300.00	100
7.	Reyes - Herrera (MEX)	US$200.00	80
8.	Orellana - Ramírez (GUA)	US$150.00	70
9.	Virgen - Cruz (MEX)		55
10.	Morales - Alfaro (CRC)		45
11.	Kinvig - LaRoque (CAN)		35
12.	Hamilton - Mann (LCA)		25
13.	Joseph - Phillip (TTO)		15
14.	Díaz - Santollo (MEX)		10

== Men's competition ==
Results on October 4, 2009

RANK	FINAL RANKING	EARNINGS	POINTS
1st place, gold medalist(s)	Virgen - Miramontes (MEX)	US$1,700.00	200
2nd place, silver medalist(s)	Kindelán - Ramírez (CUB)	US$1,000.00	180
3rd place, bronze medalist(s)	Binstock - Zbyszewski (CAN)	US$750.00	160
4.	Reader - Sewell (CAN)	US$500.00	140
5.	Irrizarry - Rodríguez (PUR)	US$400.00	110
6.	Arenas - Colosio (MEX)	US$300.00	100
7.	Ontiveros - Ontiveros (MEX)	US$200.00	80
8.	Barajas - Cárdenas (MEX)	US$150.00	70
9.	Burnham - Jagoda (USA)		55
10.	Medrano - Vargas (ESA)		45
11.	López - Monge (CRC)		35
12.	Calderón - López (NCA)		25
13.	Bolaños - Garrido (GUA)		15
14.	Whitfield - Williams (TTO)		10
15.	William - Clercent (LCA)		5

== See also ==
- NORCECA Beach Volleyball Circuit 2009
