= 2009 NORCECA Beach Volleyball Circuit (Montelimar) =

Tournament details
- Host country: Nicaragua
- Dates: October 28 - November 2, 2009
- Teams: 24
- Venue: Montelimar Beach (in Managua host cities)

The 2009 NORCECA Beach Volleyball Circuit at Montelimar, was held October 28 - November 2, 2009 in Montelimar Beach, Managua, Nicaragua. It was the last leg of the NORCECA Beach Volleyball Circuit 2009.

== Women's competition ==
RANK	FINAL RANKING	EARNINGS	POINTS
1st place, gold medalist(s)	Santiago - Acevedo (PUR)	US$1,700.00	200
2nd place, silver medalist(s)	Morales - Alfaro (CRC)	US$1,000.00	180
3rd place, bronze medalist(s)	Virgen - Revuelta (MEX)	US$750.00	160
4.	Molina - Soler (ESA)	US$500.00	140
5.	Dansereu - Diotte (CAN)	US$400.00	110
6.	Lowe - Smith (USA)	US$300.00	100
7.	Del Rosario - Fabian (DOM)	US$200.00	80
8.	Bolaños - Ramírez (GUA)	US$150.00	70
9.	López - Torres (NCA)		55
10.	Rodríguez - Rostrán (NCA)		45
11.	Blanco - Cadle (BIZ)		35

== Men's competition ==
Results on November 3, 2009

RANK	FINAL RANKING	EARNINGS	POINTS
1st place, gold medalist(s)	Virgen - Miramontes (MEX)	US$1,700.00	200
2nd place, silver medalist(s)	Lewis - Wilson (JAM)	US$1,000.00	180
3rd place, bronze medalist(s)	Pérez - Recio (DOM)	US$750.00	160
4.	Araya - Guevara (CRC)	US$500.00	140
5.	Villegas - Villegas (CRC)	US$400.00	110
6.	Bolaños - Garrido (GUA)	US$300.00	100
7.	Medrano - Vargas (ESA)	US$200.00	80
8.	Hernández - Vargas (ESA)	US$150.00	70
9.	Gutiérrez - Umaña (NCA)		55
10.	Lynch - Zanzucchi (USA)		45
11.	Calderón - López (NCA)		35
12.	Arnold - Audinett (BIZ)		25
13.	Baide - Serrano (HON)		15

== See also ==
- NORCECA Beach Volleyball Circuit 2009
