= 2008 NORCECA Beach Volleyball Circuit (Guadalajara) =

Tournament details
- Host country: Mexico
- Dates: May 7–12, 2008
- Teams: 25
- Venue: Guadalajara, Jalisco (in Guadalajara, Jalisco host cities)

The 2008 NORCECA Beach Volleyball Circuit at Guadalajara was held May 7–12, 2008 in Guadalajara, Jalisco, Mexico. It was the fifth leg of the NORCECA Beach Volleyball Circuit 2008.

== Women's competition ==
RANK	FINAL RANKING	EARNINGS	POINTS
1st place, gold medalist(s)	Estrada - Revuelta (MEX)	US$1,500.00	200
2nd place, silver medalist(s)	Reyes - Gaxiola (MEX)	US$1,000.00	180
3rd place, bronze medalist(s)	Canet - Sinal (CUB)	US$750.00	160
4.	Virgen - Acosta (MEX)	US$550.00	140
5.	Byrd - Van Fleet (USA)	US$400.00	110
6.	Escobeda - López (MEX)	US$400.00	100
7.	López - Ramos (PUR)	US$200.00	80
8.	Ramírez - Alfaro (CRC)	US$200.00	70
9.	Molina - Soler (ESA)		55
10.	Lombardi - Caldwell (USA)		45
11.	Thomas - Long (CAN)		35
12.	Hamilton - Mann (LCA)		25

== Men's competition ==
RANK	FINAL RANKING	EARNINGS	POINTS
1st place, gold medalist(s)	Kindelán - Munder (CUB)	US$1,500.00	200
2nd place, silver medalist(s)	Irrizarry - Rodríguez (PUR)	US$1,000.00	180
3rd place, bronze medalist(s)	Flores - García (MEX)	US$750.00	160
4.	Hall - Chisholm (CAN)	US$550.00	140
5.	Bolaños - Garrido (GUA)	US$400.00	110
6.	Colosio - Islas (MEX)	US$400.00	100
7.	Quinn - Fischer (USA)	US$200.00	80
8.	Medrano - Vargas (ESA)	US$200.00	70
9.	Lewis - Wilson (JAM)		55
10.	Seabrookes - Hodges (SKN)		45
11.	López - Suárez (CRC)		35
12.	Baide - Sánchez (HON)		25
13.	Olsen - Matthew (ANT)		10
