= 2009 NORCECA Beach Volleyball Circuit (Cayman Islands) =

Tournament details
- Host country: Cayman Islands
- Dates: March 27–29, 2009
- Teams: 20
- Venue: Seven Mile Beach (in Grand Cayman host cities)

The 2009 NORCECA Beach Volleyball Circuit at Cayman Islands was held March 27–29, 2009 in Grand Cayman, Cayman Islands. It was the first leg of the NORCECA Beach Volleyball Circuit 2009.

== Women's competition ==
RANK	FINAL RANKING	EARNINGS	POINTS
1st place, gold medalist(s)	Sinal - Ballar (CUB)	US$1,700.00	200
2nd place, silver medalist(s)	Virgen - Cruz (MEX)	US$1,000.00	180
3rd place, bronze medalist(s)	Batt - Wallin (USA)	US$750.00	160
4.	Orellana - Ramírez (GUA)	US$500.00	140
5.	Cruz - Mora (CRC)	US$400.00	110
6.	Brenton - Bily (CAY)	US$300.00	100
7.	Joseph - Phillip (TTO)	US$200.00	80
8.	Sharp - Lombardi (USA)	US$150.00	70
9.	Del Rosario - Del Rosario (DOM)		55
10.	Richards - Daley (JAM)		45

== Men's competition ==
RANK	FINAL RANKING	EARNINGS	POINTS
1st place, gold medalist(s)	Wight - Bruning (USA)	US$1,700.00	200
2nd place, silver medalist(s)	González - Peña (CUB)	US$1,000.00	180
3rd place, bronze medalist(s)	Cadieux - Van Huizen (CAN)	US$750.00	160
4.	Irrizarry - Rodríguez (PUR)	US$500.00	140
5.	Pérez - Recio (DOM)	US$400.00	110
6.	Lewis - Wilson (JAM)	US$300.00	100
7.	Allstot - Lynch (USA)	US$200.00	80
8.	Rankin - Thompson (CAY)	US$150.00	70
9.	Bolaños - Garrido (GUA)		55
10.	Francois - Rivers (TTO)		45
