= 2008 NORCECA Beach Volleyball Circuit (El Salvador) =

Tournament details
- Host country: El Salvador
- Dates: April 16–21, 2008
- Teams: 26
- Venue: San Salvador (in San Salvador host cities)

The 2008 NORCECA Beach Volleyball Circuit at El Salvador was held April 23–28, 2008 in San Salvador, El Salvador. It was the third leg of the NORCECA Beach Volleyball Circuit 2008.

== Women's competition ==
RANK	FINAL RANKING	EARNINGS	POINTS
1st place, gold medalist(s)	Byrd - Chapek (USA)	US$1,500.00	200
2nd place, silver medalist(s)	Molina - Soler (ESA)	US$1,000.00	180
3rd place, bronze medalist(s)	López - Ramos (PUR)	US$750.00	160
4.	Orellana - Ramírez (GUA)	US$550.00	140
5.	Thomas - Long (CAN)	US$400.00	110
6.	Calderón - Murillo (CRC)	US$400.00	100
7.	Larios - Aquino (ESA)	US$200.00	80
8.	Hamilton - Mann (LCA)	US$200.00	70
9.	Traña - Guandique (NCA)		55
10.	Dyer - Wilkes (SKN)		45
11.	Soler - Rivas (ESA)		35
12.	Beckles - Gloud (TTO)		25

== Men's competition ==
RANK	FINAL RANKING	EARNINGS	POINTS
1st place, gold medalist(s)	Ratledge - Fischer (USA)	US$1,500.00	200
2nd place, silver medalist(s)	Irrizarry - Rodríguez (PUR)	US$1,000.00	180
3rd place, bronze medalist(s)	Medrano - Vargas (ESA)	US$750.00	160
4.	López - Suárez (CRC)	US$550.00	140
5.	Pérez - Vargas (DOM)	US$400.00	110
6.	Bolaños - Garrido (GUA)	US$400.00	100
7.	Baide - Sánchez (HON)	US$200.00	80
8.	Calderón - Castro (NCA)	US$200.00	70
9.	Morales - Escobar (ESA)		55
10.	Vargas - Leiva (ESA)		45
11.	Collins - Percival (SKN)		35
12.	Charles - Dennis (TTO)		25
13.	Ozuna - Pineda (GUA)		15
14.	Robles - Petrona (ARU)		10
