= 2008 NORCECA Beach Volleyball Circuit (Puerto Rico) =

Tournament details
- Host country: Puerto Rico
- Dates: May 21–26, 2008
- Teams: 22
- Venue: Carolina, Puerto Rico (in Carolina, Puerto Rico host cities)

The 2008 NORCECA Beach Volleyball Circuit at Carolina was held May 21–26, 2008 in Carolina, Puerto Rico. It was the sixth leg of the NORCECA Beach Volleyball Circuit 2008.

== Women's competition ==
RANK	FINAL RANKING	EARNINGS	POINTS
1st place, gold medalist(s)	Byrd - Chapek (USA)	US$1,500	200
2nd place, silver medalist(s)	Estrada - Revuelta (MEX)	US$1,000	180
3rd place, bronze medalist(s)	Santiago - Conley (PUR)	US$750	160
4.	Virgen - Acosta (MEX)	US$550	140
5.	López - Ramos (PUR)	US$400	110
6.	Beauchamp - García (PUR)	US$400	100
7.	Orellana - Recinos (GUA)	US$200	80
8.	Thomas - Long (CAN)	US$200	70
9.	Thomson - Rodrigue (CAN)		55
10.	López - Muñiz (PUR)		45
11.	Alas - Alfaro (CRC)		35

== Men's competition ==
RANK	FINAL RANKING	EARNINGS	POINTS
1st place, gold medalist(s)	Papaleo - Hernández (PUR)	US$1,500	200
2nd place, silver medalist(s)	Otero - Rivera (PUR)	US$1,000	180
3rd place, bronze medalist(s)	Irrizarry - Rodríguez (PUR)	US$750	160
4.	González - Méndez (PUR)	US$550	140
5.	Mercer - Garrido (USA)	US$400	110
6.	Lewis - Wilson (JAM)	US$400	100
7.	Bolaños - Garrido (GUA)	US$200	80
8.	Hall - Chisholm (CAN)	US$200	70
9.	Seabrookes - Hodges (SKN)		55
10.	Rodríguez - Johnson (DOM)		45
11.	Ramírez - Piskulich (CRC)		35
