= 2008 NORCECA Beach Volleyball Circuit (Manzanillo) =

Tournament details
- Host country: Mexico
- Dates: April 30 - May 5, 2008
- Teams: 19
- Venue: Manzanillo, Colima (in Manzanillo, Colima host cities)

The 2008 NORCECA Beach Volleyball Circuit at Manzanillo was held April 30 - May 5, 2008 in Manzanillo, Colima, Mexico. It was the fourth leg of the NORCECA Beach Volleyball Circuit 2008.

== Women's competition ==
RANK	FINAL RANKING	EARNINGS	POINTS
1st place, gold medalist(s)	Canet - Sinal (CUB)	US$1,500.00	200
2nd place, silver medalist(s)	Estrada - Revuelta (MEX)	US$1,000.00	180
3rd place, bronze medalist(s)	Reyes - López (MEX)	US$750.00	160
4.	Virgen - Acosta (MEX)	US$550.00	140
5.	López - Ramos (PUR)	US$400.00	110
6.	Ramírez - Alfaro (CRC)	US$400.00	100
7.	Molina - Soler (ESA)	US$200.00	80
8.	Henderson - McReynolds (USA)	US$200.00	70
9.	Thomas - Long (CAN)		55
10.	Hamilton - Mann (LCA)		45

== Men's competition ==
RANK	FINAL RANKING	EARNINGS	POINTS
1st place, gold medalist(s)	Kindelán - Munder (CUB)	US$1,500.00	200
2nd place, silver medalist(s)	Irrizarry - Rodríguez (PUR)	US$1,000.00	180
3rd place, bronze medalist(s)	Hall - Chisholm (CAN)	US$750.00	160
4.	López - Suárez (CRC)	US$550.00	140
5.	Hernández - Pérez (MEX)	US$400.00	110
6.	Bolaños - Garrido (GUA)	US$400.00	100
7.	Johnson - Witt (USA)	US$200.00	80
8.	Baide - Sánchez (HON)	US$200.00	70
9.	Olsen - Matthew (ANT)		55
