= 2008 NORCECA Beach Volleyball Circuit (Santo Domingo) =

Tournament details
- Host country: Dominican Republic
- Dates: March 19–24, 2008
- Teams: 20
- Venue: Boca Chica Beach (in Santo Domingo host cities)

The 2008 NORCECA Beach Volleyball Circuit at Boca Chica was held March 19–24, 2008 in Boca Chica, Dominican Republic. It was the first leg of the NORCECA Beach Volleyball Circuit 2008.

== Women's competition ==
RANK	FINAL RANKING	EARNINGS	POINTS
1st place, gold medalist(s)	Canet - Sinal (CUB)	US$1,500.00	200
2nd place, silver medalist(s)	Morales - Alfaro (CRC)	US$1,000.00	180
3rd place, bronze medalist(s)	López-Ramos (PUR)	US$750.00	160
4.	Joseph - Philip (TTO)	US$550.00	140
5.	Selmo - Selmo (DOM)	US$400.00	110
6.	Lewis - Whitehall (BAR)	US$400.00	100
7.	Orellana - Recinos (GUA)	US$200.00	80
8.	Restituyo - Carmona (DOM)	US$200.00	70

== Men's competition ==
RANK	FINAL RANKING	EARNINGS	POINTS
1st place, gold medalist(s)	Ratledge - Fischer (USA)	US$1,500.00	200
2nd place, silver medalist(s)	Irrizarry - Rodríguez (PUR)	US$1,000.00	180
3rd place, bronze medalist(s)	Lewis - Wilson (JAM)	US$750.00	160
4.	Otero-Rivera (PUR)	US$550.00	140
5.	Kindelán-Munder (CUB)	US$400.00	110
6.	Villegas - Villegas (CRC)	US$400.00	100
7.	Vargas - De Jesús (DOM)	US$200.00	80
8.	Pérez - Abreu (DOM)	US$200.00	70
9.	Oxley - Gittens (BAR)		55
10.	Seabrookes - Hodges (SKN)		45
11.	Espinoza - Sandoval (CRC)		35
12.	Bolaños - Garrido (GUA)		25
