= 2009 NORCECA Beach Volleyball Circuit (Jamaica) =

Volleyball competition held in Jamaica

Tournament details
- Host country: Jamaica
- Dates: June 26–29, 2009
- Teams: 18
- Venue: Barbicon Park (in Kingston host cities)

The 2009 NORCECA Beach Volleyball Circuit at Jamaica was held June 26–29, 2009 in Kingston, Jamaica. It was the fourth leg of the NORCECA Beach Volleyball Circuit 2009.

== Women's competition ==
RANK	FINAL RANKING	EARNINGS	POINTS
1st place, gold medalist(s)	Day - Robertson (USA)	US$1,700.00	200
2nd place, silver medalist(s)	Santiago - Acevedo (PUR)	US$1,000.00	180
3rd place, bronze medalist(s)	Morales - Alfaro (CRC)	US$750.00	160
4.	Orellana - Ramírez (GUA)	US$500.00	140
5.	Fabian - Carmona (DOM)	US$400.00	110
6.	Joseph - Phillip (TTO)	US$300.00	100
7.	Long - LaRoque (CAN)	US$200.00	80
8.	Hamilton - Mann (LCA)	US$150.00	70
9.	Richards - Daley (JAM)		55

== Men's competition ==
RANK	FINAL RANKING	EARNINGS	POINTS
1st place, gold medalist(s)	Virgen - Miramontes (MEX)	US$1,700.00	200
2nd place, silver medalist(s)	Lewis - Wilson (JAM)	US$1,000.00	180
3rd place, bronze medalist(s)	Irrizarry - Rodríguez (PUR)	US$750.00	160
4.	Villegas - Villegas (CRC)	US$500.00	140
5.	Bolaños - Garrido (GUA)	US$400.00	110
6.	Araya - Piskulich (CRC)	US$300.00	100
7.	Fabian - Recio (DOM)	US$200.00	80
8.	William - Clercent (LCA)	US$150.00	70
9.	Cathalina - Juliana (AHO)		55

== See also ==
- NORCECA Beach Volleyball Circuit 2009
