= Mayra García =

Mexican beach volleyball player (born 1972)

Personal information
- Full name: Mayra Aide García López
- Nationality: Mexico
- Born: May 16, 1972 (age 54); Tecate, Mexico
- Hometown: Tecate, Baja California, Mexico
- Height: 1.73 m (5 ft 8 in)
- Weight: 64 kg (141 lb)
- Spike: 270 cm (110 in)
- Block: 285 cm (112 in)

Beach volleyball information

Current teammate
Years	Teammate
2009	Bibiana Candelas
Honours
Women's beach volleyball
Representing Mexico
Pan American Games
Silver medal – second place	2003 Santo Domingo	Beach
Bronze medal – third place	2007 Rio de Janeiro	Beach
Silver medal – second place	2011 Guadalajara	Beach
Central American and Caribbean Games
Gold medal – first place	2002 San Salvador	Beach
NORCECA Beach Volleyball Circuit
Gold medal – first place	2009 Tijuana	Beach
Gold medal – first place	2009 Puerto Vallarta	Beach
Gold medal – first place	2008 Guatemala Beach	Beach

Mayra Aide García Lopez (born May 16, 1972) is a beach volleyball player from Mexico, who won the silver medal in the women's beach team competition at the 2003 Pan American Games in Santo Domingo, Dominican Republic, partnering Hilda Gaxiola. She represented her native country at the 2004 Summer Olympics in Athens, Greece and also at the 2008 Summer Olympics with her current partner Bibiana Candelas.
