= Nirian Sinal =

Cuban beach volleyball player (born 1986)

Personal information
- Full name: Nirian Sinal Iznaga
- Born: July 20, 1986 (age 40); Ciego de Ávila, Cuba
Honours
Women's beach volleyball
Representing Cuba
NORCECA Beach Volleyball Circuit
Gold medal – first place	2009 Cayman Islands	Beach
Gold medal – first place	2009 Guatemala	Beach
Gold medal – first place	2009 Boca Chica	Beach
Gold medal – first place	2008 Santo Domingo	Beach
Gold medal – first place	2008 Manzanillo	Beach
Silver medal – second place	2008 Guatemala	Beach
Bronze medal – third place	2008 Guadalajara	Beach

Nirian Sinal Iznaga (born July 20, 1986, in Ciego de Ávila) is a female beach volleyball player from Cuba who participated in the Qualification Tournament in the SWATCH-FIVB U-21 Women's World Championship in Mysłowice, Poland, partnering with Kirenia Reina. She also represented her native country at the NORCECA Beach Volleyball Circuit in the 2008, playing with Ion Canet; and 2009, playing with Kirenia Ballar.
