= Yunieski Ramírez =

Cuban beach volleyball player

Personal information
- Nationality: Cuba
Beach volleyball information
- Years: Teammate
- 2009: Yoandri Kindelán
Honours
Men's beach volleyball
Representing Cuba
NORCECA Beach Volleyball Circuit
Gold medal – first place	2009 Puerto Vallarta	Beach
Gold medal – first place	2007 Guatemala City	Beach
Silver medal – second place	2009 Manzanillo	Beach
Bronze medal – third place	2009 Tijuana	Beach
Bronze medal – third place	2007 Boca Chica	Beach

Yunieski Ramírez is a male beach volleyball player from Cuba, who twice won the gold medal playing with Yoandri Kindelán in the men's competition at the NORCECA Beach Volleyball Circuit 2007 at Guatemala and in 2009 in Puerto Vallarta.

Playing with Yaimel Borrel, he won the bronze medal in April 2009 at the III Alba Games in Ciego de Avila, Cuba.

At the 2008 Cuban National Games (Olimpiada Nacional), partnering Yusnaikel Argilago he won the bronze medal representing Occidentales.
