= Matt Zbyszewski =

Personal information
- Full name: Maciej Zbyszewski
- Nickname: Matt
- Nationality: Canada
- Born: August 21, 1981 (age 45); Jasień, Poland
- Hometown: Toronto, Canada
- Height: 192 cm (6 ft 4 in)
- Weight: 86 kg (190 lb)

Beach volleyball information

Current teammate
Years	Teammate
2009	Josh Binstock
Honours
Men's Beach Volleyball
Representing Canada
NORCECA Beach Volleyball Circuit
Silver medal – second place	Puerto Vallarta 2009	Beach
Bronze medal – third place	Manzanillo 2009	Beach

Maciej "Matt" Zbyszewski (born August 21, 1981 in Jasień) is a male beach volleyball and volleyball player and coach from Canada who won the silver medal at the NORCECA Circuit 2009 at Puerto Vallarta playing with Josh Binstock.

He won the silver medal at the 2008 SO Pro Beach Volleyball Tournament, partnering with Jessi Lelliott. That year he took the gold medal at the Canadian National Beach Volleyball Championships, partnering Josh Binstock, also in 2009. At the Center of Gravity 2009 he won the silver medal, playing with Josh Binstock.

== College ==
He played with Indiana University-Purdue University Fort Wayne where he became AVCA "All American" First Team and also All American by Volleyball Magazine, 2004 MIVA Player of the Year, 6 times Player of the week between 2004 and 2005 also in 2005 MIVA All-Academic Team. In 2005 he also won the Indiana-Purdue Student Newspapers award The Communicator's "Most Valuable Athlete Award ".

== Clubs ==
- (Cyprus) Omonoia Nicosia (2006–2007)
- (Spain) UD Vecindario (2007–2008)

== Awards ==
=== NCAA ===
- 2005 The Communicator's "Most Valuable Athlete Award "
- 2005 MIVA - Two times "Player of the Week"
- 2005 MIVA "All-Academic Team"
- 2004 MIVA - "Player of the Year"
- 2004 MIVA - Four times "Player of the Week"
- 2004 AVCA "All-American" first team
- 2004 Volleyball Magazine "All-American"

=== National team ===
- NORCECA Beach Volleyball Circuit Puerto Vallarta 2009 Silver Medal
- NORCECA Beach Volleyball Circuit Manzanillo 2009 Bronze Medal

=== Beach volleyball ===
- 2009 Canadian National Beach Volleyball Championships Gold Medal
- 2009 Center Of Gravity Tournament Silver Medal
- 2008 Canadian National Beach Volleyball Championships Gold Medal
- 2007 Canadian National Beach Volleyball Championships Silver Medal
- 2007 So Pro Beach Volleyball Championships Gold Medal
