= Yoandri Kindelán =

Cuban beach volleyball player

Personal information
- Full name: Yoandri Kindelán Álvarez
- Nationality: Cuba
Beach volleyball information
Current teammate
- Years: Teammate
- 2009: Yunieski Ramírez
Previous teammates
- Years: Teammate
- 2008: Leonel Munder
Honours
Men's beach volleyball
Representing Cuba
NORCECA Beach Volleyball Circuit
Gold medal – first place	Puerto Vallarta 2009	Beach
Gold medal – first place	Manzanillo 2008	Beach
Gold medal – first place	Guadalajara 2008	Beach
Gold medal – first place	Guatemala City 2007	Beach
Silver medal – second place	Manzanillo 2009	Beach
Silver medal – second place	Guatemala City 2008	Beach
Bronze medal – third place	Tijuana 2009	Beach
Bronze medal – third place	Boca Chica 2007	Beach

Yoandri Kindelán Álvarez is a male beach volleyball player from Cuba, who participated with Leonel Munder in the SWATCH-FIVB U-21 Men's World Championships in Mysłowice, Poland finishing in the 29th position in the Qualification Tournament.

With Yunieski Ramírez he won the gold medal in the men's competition at the NORCECA Beach Volleyball Circuit 2007 at Guatemala and in 2009 in Puerto Vallarta. With Leonel Munder he won in the 2008 season in Manzanillo and Guadalajara.

Playing with Javier Jiménez, he won the gold medal in April 2009 at the III Alba Games in Ciego de Avila, Cuba.
