= Iris Santos =

Dominican Republic volleyball player (born 1984)

Personal information
- Full name: Iris Santos Hernández
- Born: January 29, 1984 (age 42); Santo Domingo, Dominican Republic
Honours
Representing Dominican Republic
Women's beach volleyball
Central American and Caribbean Games
| Bronze medal – third place | 2002 San Salvador | Beach |
Women's volleyball
NORCECA Championship
| Bronze medal – third place | 2007 Winnipeg | Team |

Iris Santos Hernández (born January 29, 1984, in Santo Domingo) is a female volleyball and beach volleyball player from Dominican Republic, who won the bronze medal in the women's beach team competition at the 2002 Central American and Caribbean Games in San Salvador, El Salvador, partnering Yudelka Bonilla. She represented her native country at the 2001 FIVB Girls' Youth World Championship in Croatia. She also played at the 2007 NORCECA Championship, winning the bronze medal with her team.
