= Heissell Carcache =

Nicaraguan beach volleyball player (born 1985)

Personal information
- Born: April 4, 1985 (age 40)

Sport
- Country: Nicaragua
- Sport: Women's volleyball

Heissell De Los Ángeles Carcache Guandique (born April 4, 1985) is a female beach volleyball player from Nicaragua, who participated in the women's indoor competition at the 2002 Central American and Caribbean Games in San Salvador, El Salvador.

== Beach Volley ==
Partnering Heidy Rostrán, she represented her native country at the 2007 NORCECA Beach Volleyball Circuit at Guatemala City. That year she also played the beach volleyball competition at the 2007 Pan American Games in Rio de Janeiro Brazil, with the same partner.

She also played the Guatemala and San Salvador legs from the NORCECA Beach Volleyball Circuit 2008 along with Heidy Traña.
