= 2009 NORCECA Beach Volleyball Circuit (Tijuana) =

Tournament details
- Host country: Mexico
- Dates: September 25–27, 2009
- Teams: 22
- Venue: High Performance Sports Center of Baja California (in Tijuana host cities)

The 2009 NORCECA Beach Volleyball Circuit at Tijuana was held September 25–27, 2009 in Tijuana, Mexico. It was the fifth leg of the NORCECA Beach Volleyball Circuit 2009.

== Women's competition ==
RANK	FINAL RANKING	EARNINGS	POINTS
1st place, gold medalist(s)	Candelas - García (MEX)	US$1,700.00	200
2nd place, silver medalist(s)	Canet - Crespo (CUB)	US$1,000.00	180
3rd place, bronze medalist(s)	Estrada - Revuelta (MEX)	US$750.00	160
4.	Morales - Alfaro (CRC)	US$500.00	140
5.	Hinga - Ratto (USA)	US$400.00	110
6.	Brambila - Ramirez (MEX)	US$300.00	100
7.	Joseph - Phillip (TTO)	US$200.00	80
8.	Acero - Heredia (MEX)	US$150.00	70

== Men's competition ==
Results on September 27, 2009

RANK	FINAL RANKING	EARNINGS	POINTS
1st place, gold medalist(s)	Virgen - Miramontes (MEX)	US$1,700.00	200
2nd place, silver medalist(s)	Irrizarry - Rodríguez (PUR)	US$1,000.00	180
3rd place, bronze medalist(s)	Kindelán - Ramírez (CUB)	US$750.00	160
4.	Dearing - Schalk (CAN)	US$500.00	140
5.	Reader - Cadieux (CAN)	US$400.00	110
5.	Ontiveros - Ontiveros (MEX)	US$300.00	100
7.	Ayala - Meza (MEX)	US$200.00	80
8.	Mercer - Wight (USA)	US$150.00	70
9.	Bolaños - Garrido (GUA)		55
10.	Medrano - Vargas (ESA)		45
11.	Calderón - López (NCA)		35
12.	Whitfield - Williams (TTO)		25
13.	Almeranza - Castillo (MEX)		15
14.	López - Monge (CRC)		10

== See also ==
- NORCECA Beach Volleyball Circuit 2009
