= Ion Canet =

Cuban beach volleyball player

Personal information
- Full name: Ion Canet Betancourt
- Nationality: Cuban
- Born: Havana
- Height: 1.80 m (5 ft 11 in)

Beach volleyball information

Current teammate
Years	Teammate
2009	Milagros Crespo

Previous teammates
Years	Teammate
2007; 2008	Kirenia Ballar; Nirian Sinal

Indoor volleyball information
- Position: Outside hitter
Honours
Women's beach volleyball
Representing Cuba
NORCECA Beach Volleyball Circuit
Gold medal – first place	Manzanillo 2009	Beach
Gold medal – first place	Boca Chica 2008	Beach
Gold medal – first place	Manzanillo 2008	Beach
Silver medal – second place	Tijuana 2009	Beach
Silver medal – second place	Puerto Vallarta 2009	Beach
Silver medal – second place	Guatemala City 2008	Beach
Silver medal – second place	Port of Spain 2007	Beach
Bronze medal – third place	Guadalajara 2008	Beach
Bronze medal – third place	Boca Chica 2007	Beach
Women's volleyball
Representing Cuba
Central American and Caribbean Games
Gold medal – first place	1998 Maracaibo	Indoor

Ion Canet Betancourt (born in Havana, Cuba) is a female beach volleyball player from Cuba who participated in the NORCECA Beach Volleyball Circuit in the 2007, playing with Kirenia Ballar; and 2008, playing with Nirian Sinal.

Canet won the Cuban Beach Volleyball National Championship, playing with Milagros Crespo.
