= Yudelka Bonilla =

Dominican Republic beach volleyball player (born 1976)

Personal information
- Full name: Yudelka Bonilla
- Born: 19 September 1976 (age 50) Mao, Valverde
- Height: 5 ft 11 in (1.80 m)
Beach volleyball information
Current teammate
Years	Teammate	
2002	Iris Santos	
Previous teammates
Years	Teammate	
1998	Evelia Cadet	
Best results
Years	Location	Result
2002	San Salvador	Bronze Medal
Honours
Women's Beach Volleyball
Representing Dominican Republic
Central American and Caribbean Games
Bronze medal – third place	2002 San Salvador	Beach
- Updated on June 2010

Yudelka Bonilla (born 19 September 1976 in Mao) is a female volleyball and beach volleyball player from Dominican Republic, who won the bronze medal in the women's beach team competition at the 2002 Central American and Caribbean Games in San Salvador, El Salvador, partnering Iris Santos. She previously competed in the 1998 version playing with Evelia Cadet, finishing in the 5th place.

== College ==
She played for California Baptist University as an outside hitter from 2004 to 2007, there she set record in kills. She became Association champion in 2004 and 2005 and runner-up in 2007. She also were Conference runner-up in 2005 with her team. She studied a major in kinesiology.

== Awards ==
=== Individuals ===
==== College ====
- 2007 NAIA Women's Volleyball "All-American" (3rd. Team)
- 2007 "All GSAC Conference Team"
- 2007 GSAC and NAIARegion II Women's "Volleyball Player" of the Week (17 September 2007)'
- 2005 NAIA Women's Volleyball "All-American" (3rd. Team)
- 2005 NAIA Tournament "Most Valuable Player"
- 2005 "All GSAC Conference Team"
- 2004 NAIA Women's Volleyball "All-American" (1st. Team)
- 2004 "All GSAC Conference Team"
- 2004 NAIA Women's Volleyball "All-Tournament Team"

=== National team ===
==== Beach Volleyball ====
- 2002 Central American and Caribbean Games - Bronze Medal
