= Milagros Crespo =

Cuban beach volleyball player (born 1979)

Personal information
- Full name: Milagros Victoria Crespo Valle
- Nationality: Cuban
- Born: 4 February 1979 (age 47); Cabaiguán
- Hometown: Sancti Spíritus
- Height: 1.73 m (5 ft 8 in)
- Weight: 60 kg (130 lb)

Beach volleyball information

Current teammate
Years	Teammate
2009	Ion Canet

Previous teammates
Years	Teammate
2008	Imara Esteves
Honours
Women's beach volleyball
Representing Cuba
NORCECA Beach Volleyball Circuit
Gold medal – first place	Manzanillo 2009	Beach
Silver medal – second place	Tijuana 2009	Beach
Silver medal – second place	Puerto Vallarta 2009	Beach

Milagros Victoria Crespo Valle (born 4 February 1979 in Cabaiguán) is a Cuban former beach volleyball player who participated in the 2008 Summer Olympics. She partnered with Imara Esteves Ribalta.

Playing with Ion Canet, she won the NORCECA Beach Volleyball Circuit 2009 Manzanillo tournament.
