= Claire Robertson =

American beach volleyball player

Claire D'Amore

Personal information
- Full name: Claire Robertson D'Amore
- Nationality: American
- Born: June 4, 1982 (age 44); Torrance, California, U.S.
- Hometown: Rolling Hills Estates, California, U.S.
- Height: 5 ft 9 in (1.76 m)

Beach volleyball information

Current teammate
Years	Teammate
2009	Emily Day

Previous teammates
Years	Teammate
6	Jenn Snyder, Nancy Mason, Kerri Walsh (6-man), Priscilla Lima
Medal record
Women's beach volleyball
Representing the United States
NORCECA Beach Volleyball Circuit
Gold medal – first place	2009 Jamaica	Beach

Claire Robertson D'Amore (born June 4, 1982, in Torrance, California) is a female beach volleyball player from the United States who has won numerous tournaments and awards, including: six CBVA wins in a row, the gold medal in Guatemala NORCECA, the gold medal at the NORCECA Circuit 2009 at Jamaica playing with Emily Day. As an AVP player, she was rookie of the year 2006, Top upcoming Player 2007, and rated top 5 in digs from 2007 to 2010.

She studied at Northern Arizona University, where she got a degree in Health Promotion and Physical Education receiving as a student athlete the awards of 2001 NAU Golden Eagle Scholar Athlete Award, All Tournament at the 2003 Fiesta Bowl Tournament, 2003 "All Conference Second Team" and 2002 "All Conference Honorable Mention".

In 1998, she won the Girls U16/U15 National Beach Championship, playing with Tawny Schulte.

== Awards ==
=== College ===
- 2003 Fiesta Bowl Tournament, All Tournament
- 2003 All Conference Second Team
- 2002 All Conference Honorable Mention
- 2001 NAU Golden Eagle Scholar Athlete Award

=== AAU ===
- 2005 Girls U16/U15 National Beach Championship Gold Medal

=== National team ===
- NORCECA Beach Volleyball Circuit Jamaica 2009 Gold Medal
