= Bibiana Candelas =

Mexican volleyball player (born 1983)

Personal information
- Full name: Bibiana Candelas Ramírez
- Nickname: Bibi
- Born: December 2, 1983 (age 42); Torreón, Coahuila, Mexico
- Hometown: Monterrey, Nuevo Leon, Mexico
- Height: 194 cm (6 ft 4 in)
- Weight: 78 kg (172 lb)

Beach volleyball information

Current teammate
Years	Teammate
2009	Mayra García
Honours
Representing Mexico
Women's volleyball
Central American and Caribbean Games
Bronze medal – third place	2002 San Salvador	Team
Women's beach volleyball
NORCECA Beach Volleyball Circuit
Gold medal – first place	Guatemala Beach 2008	Beach
Gold medal – first place	Tijuana 2009	Beach
Gold medal – first place	Puerto Vallarta 2009	Beach
Pan American Games
Silver medal – second place	2011 Guadalajara	Beach
Bronze medal – third place	2007 Rio de Janeiro	Beach

Bibiana Candelas Ramírez (born December 2, 1983, in Torreon, Coahuila) is a 6 ft 5 in (196 cm) female beach volleyball and indoor volleyball player who represented her native country, Mexico, at the 2008 Olympics with her beach partner, Mayra García.

== Prep and early life ==
Candelas was born in Torreón, Coahuila.

She graduated in 2002 from Colegio Ponceño in Puerto Rico, but attended Preparatoria Luzac in Torreón as a freshman and sophomore. She was an eight-year (1997–2004) member of the Mexico women's national volleyball team.

== USC ==
She played middle blocker at the University of Southern California from 2002 to 2005 and was a three time All-American. She helped her team win the 2002 and 2003 NCAA Women's Volleyball Championship, as well as a final four appearance in 2004.

== National team ==
Candelas played in the 2002 Pan-American Cup helping her team to reach the 4th place and individually winning the Best Blocker award.

- 2002: 21st place in the World Championship in Germany
- 2002: Bronze Medal in the Central American and Caribbean Games in El Salvador
- 2006: 21st place in the World Championship in Japan

== Pan American Games ==
Candelas won the silver medal in 2011 Pan American Games.

== Clubs ==
- (Puerto Rico) Leonas de Ponce (2002)

== Awards ==
=== Individuals ===
- 2002 Pan-American Cup "Best Blocker"

Awards
Preceded by April Ross (USA)	Women's FIVB World Tour "Top Rookie"; 2008	Succeeded by Angie Akers (USA); Louise Bawden (AUS)
