= Raúl Papaleo =

Puerto Rican volleyball player

Personal information
- Full name: Raúl Papaleo Pérez
- Born: October 11, 1971 (age 55); San Juan, Puerto Rico
- Height: 6 ft 1 in (185 cm)
- Education: Indiana University–Purdue University Fort Wayne

Beach volleyball information
Teammate
Ramón Hernández
Honours
Men's beach volleyball
Representing Puerto Rico
NORCECA Beach Volleyball Circuit
Gold medal – first place	2008 Carolina Beach	Beach
NORCECA Beach Volleyball Championship
Silver medal – second place	2006 Boca Chica	Beach
Pan American Games
Bronze medal – third place	2003 Santo Domingo	Beach
Central American and Caribbean Games
Gold medal – first place	2002 San Salvador	Beach

Raúl Papaleo Pérez (born October 11, 1971), more commonly known as Raúl Papaleo, is a former beach volleyball player from Puerto Rico. He won the bronze medal in the men's beach team competition at the 2003 Pan American Games in Santo Domingo, partnering with Ramón Hernández.

== College ==
Papaleo played college volleyball at Indiana University-Purdue University at Fort Wayne. He was an AVCA All-American in 1992 and 1993. He led his team to MIVA titles in 1991 and 1992. In 2007, Papaleo was inducted into the Purdue Fort Wayne Hall of Fame.

== Beach volleyball ==
In 1995, Papaleo won the AVP qualifier in Denver in beach volleyball. That same year, he played in the pre-Olympic qualifier for Puerto Rico. In 1996, he was named AVP Rookie of the Year.

In the Pan American Games held in the Dominican Republic in August 2003, Raúl Papaleo and his teammate, Ramon Hernandez, won the bronze medal by defeating the U.S. team, represented by David Fischer and Brad Torsone, by 21–17 and 21–14 in 43 minutes. Raúl Papaleo and Ramon Hernandez represented Puerto Rico in the 2004 Olympics which were held in Athens. This was the first time in the history of Puerto Rico that the island was represented in beach volleyball in an Olympic competition.

Papaleo finished in second place at the 2006 NORCECA Men's Beach Volleyball Continental Championship along with Joseph Gil.

At the 2008 NORCECA Beach Volleyball Circuit, Papaleo won first place at the Carolina Beach Volleyball Tournament along with Ramón Hernández.

In his beach volleyball career, Papaleo won a total of $123,807 in prizes.

== Professional indoor volleyball ==
Papaleo played locally for the Caribes de San Sebastián in the Liga de Voleibol Superior Masculino of Puerto Rico.

In 2008, Papaleo was contracted by the Guaynabo Mets of the Liga de Voleibol Superior Masculino.

== See also ==
- List of Puerto Ricans
- Sports in Puerto Rico
