= Hilda Gaxiola =

Mexican beach volleyball player (born 1972)

Personal information
- Full name: Hilda Gaxiola Álvarez
- Born: July 14, 1972 (age 54); Guamúchil, Sinaloa, Mexico
- Height: 181 cm (5 ft 11 in)
- Weight: 70 kg (154 lb)
Honours
Women's beach volleyball
Representing Mexico
Pan American Games
Silver medal – second place	2003 Santo Domingo	Beach
Central American and Caribbean Games
Gold medal – first place	2002 San Salvador	Beach
NORCECA Beach Volleyball Circuit
Silver medal – second place	Guadalajara 2008	Beach

Hilda Gaxiola Álvarez (born July 14, 1972 in Guamúchil, Sinaloa) is a female beach volleyball player from Mexico, who won the silver medal in the women's beach team competition at the 2003 Pan American Games in Santo Domingo, Dominican Republic, partnering Mayra García. She represented her native country at two consecutive Summer Olympics, starting in 2000 in Sydney, Australia.
