= Saralyn Smith =

American beach volleyball player

Personal information
- Nationality: American
- Born: March 23, 1978 (age 48); Key West, Florida, U.S.
- Hometown: Huntington Beach, California, U.S.
- Height: 6 ft 1 in (1.86 m)

Beach volleyball information

Current teammate
Years	Teammate
2009	Beth Van Fleet
Medal record
Women's beach volleyball
Representing the United States
NORCECA Beach Volleyball Circuit
Silver medal – second place	2009 Guatemala	Beach
Bronze medal – third place	2009 Manzanillo	Beach

Saralyn Smith (born March 23, 1978, in Key West, Florida) is a female beach volleyball player from the United States who won the silver medal at the NORCECA Circuit 2009 at Guatemala playing with Beth Van Fleet.

She also participated in the Association of Volleyball Professionals tournaments since 2002. There she ended up in the 9th position many times.

== College ==
Smith played basketball and volleyball at the University of Hartford. For her volleyball team she set the record for most blocks in a single game as well as career blocks per game average. She also ranks among the school career leaders in hitting percentage. In 1999 she led the America East Conference in blocks per game.

Graduated from Hartford and received the Ribicoff Scholarship, an honor given to the top senior (in a class of roughly 2,000) for academic excellence, leadership, and community service. In 2001, she received a master's degree in Organizational Behavior, and has worked part-time or full-time in that field ever since.

== Awards ==
=== National team ===
- NORCECA Beach Volleyball Circuit Guatemala 2009 Silver Medal
- NORCECA Beach Volleyball Circuit Manzanillo 2009 Bronze Medal
