= Martha Revuelta =

Mexican volleyball player

Personal information
- Full name: Martha Revuelta Jiménez
- Nationality: Mexico
- Born: September 6, 1986 (age 40); Mexico City, Mexico
- Hometown: Mexico City, Mexico
- Height: 176 cm (5 ft 9 in)
- Weight: 77 kg (170 lb)

Beach volleyball information

Current teammate
Years	Teammate
2009	Diana Estrada

Previous teammates
Years	Teammate	Tours (points)
2005	Teresa Galindo	176
Honours
Representing Mexico
Women's volleyball
Central American and Caribbean Games
Bronze medal – third place	2002 San Salvador	Team
Women's beach volleyball
Central American and Caribbean Games
Silver medal – second place	2006 Cartagena	Beach
NORCECA Beach Volleyball Circuit
Gold medal – first place	Guadalajara 2008	Beach
Silver medal – second place	Manzanillo 2009	Beach
Silver medal – second place	Manzanillo 2008	Beach
Silver medal – second place	Carolina 2008	Beach
Bronze medal – third place	Tijuana 2009	Beach

Martha Revuelta Jiménez (born September 6, 1986) is a female beach volleyball and volleyball player from Mexico, who played during the Swatch FIVB World Tour 2005 playing with Teresa Galindo.

Participating at the 2003 SWATCH-FIVB U-18 World Championships in Pattaya Thailand, and partnering Diana Estrada, they finished in the 4th place, after losing the bronze medal match 21–19, 17–21, 15-7 from Frederike Fischer-Sandra Piasecki, from Germany.

She also represented her home country at the 2006 Central American and Caribbean Games partnering Vanessa Virgen and winning the silver medal. That year she was the volleyball female recipient of the "Luchador Olmeca" Award.

At the NORCECA Beach Volleyball Circuit 2008 she won the gold medal at the Guadalajara Tournament.

== Indoor ==
She also played indoor volleyball, playing in the 2003, 2007, 2008 and 2009 versions of the Pan-American Cup. She also took part at the tournament during the 2007 Pan American Games and 2002 Central American and Caribbean Games.

== Clubs ==
- IMSS Valle de Mexico
- (Mexico) Porteñas de Veracruz 2009

== Awards ==
=== Individuals ===
- 2006 Luchador Olmeca
- 2006 Borrego de Oro Instituto Tecnológico de Monterrey Campus Cd. de México
