= Beach volleyball at the 2003 Pan American Games =

- Venue: Feria Ganadera
- Dates: 2–9 August 2003
- Competitors: 24

The beach volleyball tournaments at the 2003 Pan American Games were held 2−9 August 2003 in Santo Domingo, Dominican Republic.

== Medal summary ==
=== Medal table ===
* Host nation (Dominican Republic)

Rank	Nation	Gold	Silver	Bronze	Total
1	Cuba	2	0	0	2
2	Brazil	0	1	1	2
3	Mexico	0	1	0	1
4	Puerto Rico	0	0	1	1
Totals (4 entries)		2	2	2	6

== Men's competition ==
Rank	Athletes
Gold medal	Francisco Álvarez and Juan Rossell (CUB)
Silver medal	Luizão Correa and Paulo Emilio Silva (BRA)
Bronze medal	Ramón Hernández and Raúl Papaleo (PUR)
4.	David Fischer and Brad Torsone (USA)
5.	Djordje Ljubicic and Michael Slean (CAN)
5.	Tomás Hernández and Juan Rodriguez Ibarra (MEX)
5.	Jeovanny Medrano and Rafael Vargas (ESA)
5.	Christian García and Alejandro Salas (DOM)
9.	Alexánder Villegas and Gilberto Villegas (CRC)
9.	Renato Boerleider and Michael Clarissa (AHO)
9.	Sergio Antezana and David Claro (BOL)
9.	Hugo Gamarra and Ramon Gaona (PAR)
13.	Sean Morrison and Nolan Tash (TRI)
13.	Shervin Rankin and Olney Thompson (CAY)
13.	Julio Berdales and Antonio Rodríquez (ECU)
13.	Gerardo Peralta and Guillermo Williman (URU)
17.	Jorge Acevedo and José Flores (GUA)

== Women's competition ==
Rank	Athletes
Gold medal	Dalixia Fernández and Tamara Larrea (CUB)
Silver medal	Mayra García and Hilda Gaxiola (MEX)
Bronze medal	Larissa França and Ana Richa (BRA)
4.	Nancy Gougeon and Wanda Guenette (CAN)
5.	Michelle Morse and Liz Pagano (USA)
5.	Patricia Díaz and Xinia Díaz (CRC)
5.	Dominique Deevlovic and Tiansol Villablanca (CHI)
5.	María Orellana and Sylvana Gómez (GUA)
9.	Yndys Novas and Judith Arias (DOM)
9.	Charlotte Heenstadt and Annedy Tromp (ARU)
9.	Vincia Shauna and Shalony Teera (ATG)
9.	Laura Herrera and Alejandra Porteiro (URU)
13.	Claudia Antezana and Maria Quiroga (BOL)

== See also ==
- Volleyball at the 2003 Pan American Games
