= Ramón Hernández (beach volleyball) =

Puerto Rican volleyball player (born 1972)

Personal information
- Full name: Ramón Hernández Cruz
- Nickname: Moncho
- Born: July 16, 1972 (age 54); San Juan, Puerto Rico
- Height: 6 ft 3 in (191 cm)
- Education: Pennsylvania State University

Beach volleyball information
Years	Teammate
2003	Raúl Papaleo

Indoor volleyball information
- Position: Outside hitter
- Number: 9 (Penn State)
Honours
Men's beach volleyball
Representing Puerto Rico
Pan American Games
Bronze medal – third place	2003 Santo Domingo	Beach
NORCECA Beach Volleyball Circuit
Gold medal – first place	2008 Carolina Beach	Beach
Central American and Caribbean Games
Gold medal – first place	2002 San Salvador	Beach

Ramón "Moncho" Hernández Cruz (born July 16, 1972), more commonly known as Ramón Hernández, is a Puerto Rican volleyball coach and former volleyball player. Hernández won the bronze medal in the men's beach volleyball team competition at the 2003 Pan American Games in Santo Domingo, partnering with Raúl Papaleo. He represented Puerto Rico in beach volleyball at the 2004 Summer Olympics in Athens.

== College ==
Hernández was a three-time All-American while playing college volleyball for Penn State from 1991 to 1994. He led Penn State to an NCAA Championship in 1994, and won the NCAA Championship Most Outstanding Player award. Penn State was the first non-California team to win the Championship. In 2014, he was inducted into the Eastern Intercollegiate Volleyball Association Hall of Fame.

== Coaching ==
Hernández was head coach of the Puerto Rican national men's volleyball team in 2017.

== Awards ==
- Three-time All-American
- NCAA Champion — 1994
- NCAA Championship Most Outstanding Player — 1994
- EIVA Hall of Fame — 2014

== See also ==
- List of Pennsylvania State University Olympians
