= Beach volleyball at the 2002 Central American and Caribbean Games =

Beach Volleyball at the Central American and Caribbean Games
- Venue: (in San Salvador host cities)

The Beach Volleyball at the 2006 Central American and Caribbean Games was held November 19–30, 2002 in San Salvador, El Salvador.

== Women's competition ==
RANK	TEAM
	Mayra García - Hilda Gaxiola (MEX)
	Frankelina Rodríguez - Milagos Cova (VEN)
	Yudelka Bonilla - Iris Santos (DOM)
4.	Elaine López - Lyan Puig (PUR)

== Men's competition ==
RANK	TEAM
	Raúl Papaleo - Ramón Hernández (PUR)
	Juan Rodríguez - Tomás Hernández (MEX)
	José Vásquez - Ricardo Rodríguez (VEN)
4.	Jeovanny Medrano - Rafael Vargas (ESA)

== See also ==
- Volleyball at the 2002 Central American and Caribbean Games
