= NORCECA Beach Volleyball Circuit 2010 =

Volleyball competitions held in North America

Tournament details
- Host country: Various
- Dates: February – November, 2010
- Venue: Various (in 15 host cities)

The 2010 NORCECA Beach Volleyball Circuit is a North American beach volleyball tour. The tour consisted in ten tournaments in both genders.

== Tournaments ==
The NORCECA scheduled the following tournaments:.

- Cayman Islands Tournament, Cayman Islands, March 19–21
- El Salvador Tournament, El Salvador, March 26–28
- Presidente Light Boca Chica Tournament, Boca Chica, Dominican Republic, April 2–4
- Guatemala Tournament, Guatemala, April 9–11
- Chiapas Tournament, Chiapas, Mexico, May 14–16
- Puerto Rico Tournament, Cabo Rojo Beach Volleyball Courts, Boquerón, Puerto Rico, June 30 – July 4
- Canada Tournament, Toronto, Canada, August 11–15
- Saint Lucia Tournament, Saint Lucia, August 18–22
- San Diego Tournament, San Diego, United States, September 15–20
- Tijuana Tournament, Tijuana, Mexico, September 22–26
- Maeva Manzanillo Tournament, Manzanillo, Mexico, September 29 – October 3
- Puerto Vallarta Tournament, Puerto Vallarta, Mexico, October 6–11
- Cuba Tournament, Varadero, Cuba, October 20–24
- Nicaragua Tournament, Nicaragua, October 27–31
- Trinidad & Tobago Tournament, Trinidad and Tobago, November 17–21
