= NORCECA Beach Volleyball Circuit 2009 =

Volleyball competitions held in North America

Tournament details
- Host country: various
- Dates: March – August 2009
- Venue: various (in 11 host cities)

The 2009 NORCECA Beach Volleyball Circuit was a North American beach volleyball tour. The tour consisted of eight tournaments in both genders.

After the decision of the Puerto Rican Volleyball Federation, cancelling its player participation in the Mexican steps of the tour, due to the H1N1 flu outbreak in Mexico, the NORCECA board decided to postpone the Mexican steps from May to late September.

== Tournaments ==
- Cayman Islands Tournament, Cayman Islands, March 25–30
- Gatorade Tournament Guatemala, Guatemala, April 1–6
- Presidente Light Boca Chica Tournament, Boca Chica, Dominican Republic, April 8–13
- Jamaica Tournament, Jamaica, June 24–29
- Tijuana Tournament, Tijuana, Mexico, September 23–27
- Maeva Manzanillo Tournament, Manzanillo, Mexico, September 30- October 4
- Puerto Vallarta Tournament, Puerto Vallarta, Mexico, October 7–11
- Nicaragua Tournament, Nicaragua, October 28 – November 2

== Tournament results ==
=== Women ===
Event:	Gold:	Silver:	Bronze:
Cayman Islands Tournament	(Cuba) Sinal - Ballar	(Mexico) Virgen - Cruz	(United States) Batt - Wallin
Gatorade Guatemala Tournament	(Cuba) Sinal - Ballar	(United States) Van Fleet - Smith	(Costa Rica) Morales - Alfaro
Presidente Light Boca Chica Tournament	(Cuba) Sinal - Ballar	(Costa Rica) Morales - Alfaro	(Mexico) Virgen - Cruz
Jamaica Tournament	(United States) Robertson - Day	(Puerto Rico) Santiago - Acevedo	(Costa Rica) Morales - Alfaro
Tijuana Tournament	(Mexico) Candelas - García	(Cuba) Canet - Crespo	(Mexico) Estrada - Revuelta
Maeva Manzanillo Tournament	(Cuba) Canet - Crespo	(Mexico) Estrada - Revuelta	(United States) Van Fleet - Smith
Puerto Vallarta Tournament	(Mexico) Candelas - García	(Cuba) Canet - Crespo	(Canada) Maloney - Broder
Nicaragua Tournament	(Puerto Rico) Santiago - Acevedo	(Costa Rica) Morales - Alfaro	(Mexico) Virgen - Revuelta

=== Men ===
Event:	Gold:	Silver:	Bronze:
Cayman Islands Tournament	(United States) Wight - Bruning	(Cuba) González - Peña	(Canada) Cadieux - Van Huizen
Gatorade Guatemala Tournament	(United States) Stolfus - Medel	(Cuba) González - Peña	(Puerto Rico) Irrizarry - Rodríguez
Presidente Light Boca Chica Tournament	(Cuba) González - Peña	(United States) Wight - Bruning	(Puerto Rico) Irrizarry - Rodríguez
Jamaica Tournament	(Mexico) Virgen - Miramontes	(Jamaica) Lewis - Wilson	(Puerto Rico) Irrizarry - Rodríguez
Tijuana Tournament	(Mexico) Virgen - Miramontes	(Puerto Rico) Irrizarry - Rodríguez	(Cuba) Kindelán - Ramírez
Maeva Manzanillo Tournament	(Mexico) Virgen - Miramontes	(Cuba) Kindelán - Ramírez	(Canada) Binstock - Zbyszewski
Puerto Vallarta Tournament	(Cuba) Kindelán - Ramírez	(Canada) Binstock - Zbyszewski	(Canada) Reader - Sewell
Nicaragua Tournament	(Mexico) Virgen - Miramontes	(Jamaica) Lewis - Wilson	(Dominican Republic) Pérez - Recio

== Medal table by country ==
Medal table as of November 5, 2009.

Position	Country:	Gold:	Silver:	Bronze:	Total:
1.	Cuba	6	5	1	12
2.	Mexico	6	2	3	11
3.	USA	3	2	2	7
4.	Puerto Rico	1	2	3	6
5.	Costa Rica	0	2	2	4
6.	Jamaica	0	2	0	2
7.	Canada	0	1	4	5
8.	Dominican Republic	0	0	1	1
