= Laura Almaral =

Mexican beach volleyball player (born 1960)

Laura Palafox

Personal information
- Full name: Laura Almaral Palafox
- Born: February 23, 1960 (age 66); Guadalajara, Jalisco, Mexico
- Height: 5 ft 5 in (1.65 m)

Beach volleyball information
Teammate
Mayra Huerta
Honours
Women's beach volleyball
Representing Mexico
Pan American Games
Bronze medal – third place	1999 Winnipeg	Beach
Central American and Caribbean Games
Gold medal – first place	1998 Maracaibo	Beach

Laura Almaral Palafox (born February 23, 1960, in Guadalajara) is a retired female beach volleyball player from Mexico who won the bronze medal in the women's beach team competition at the 1999 Pan American Games in Winnipeg, Manitoba, Canada, partnering with Mayra Huerta.
