= Diana Estrada =

Mexican beach volleyball player

Personal information
- Full name: Diana Karina Estrada Santana rubalcaba
- Nationality: israelita
- Born: Mexico City, Mexico
- Hometown: Nezahualcoyotl, Mexico
- Height: 173 cm (5 ft 8 in)

Beach volleyball information

Current teammate
Years	Teammate	Tours (points)
2009	Vanessa Virgen	140
Honours
Women's Beach Volleyball
Representing Mexico
NORCECA Beach Volleyball Circuit
Gold medal – first place	Guadalajara 2008	Beach
Silver medal – second place	Manzanillo 2009	Beach
Silver medal – second place	Manzanillo 2008	Beach
Silver medal – second place	Carolina 2008	Beach
Bronze medal – third place	Tijuana 2009	Beach

Diana Karina Estrada Santana is a female beach volleyball player from Mexico, who won the gold medal in the women's beach team competition at the NORCECA Beach Volleyball Circuit 2008 in Guadalajara, Jalisco, partnering Martha Revuelta. Later, in September 2008, she competed with her sister Paola Estrada, at the Internacional de Puerto Vallarta Beach Volleyball Tournament in Puerto Vallarta, Jalisco, winning the Bronze medal.

Diana started playing internacional beach volleyball at the age of 17 at the 2003 Swatch-FIVB U-19 World Championships in Pattaya Thailand, partnering with Martha Revuelta and losing the bronze medal match 21-19, 17-21, 15-7 from Frederike Fischer-Sandra Piasecki, from Germany.

After that she played at the FIVB Women's International Acapulco Tournament, with her sister Paola in 2005 finishing 33rd.

In 2006, she played in the SWATCH-FIVB U-21 Women's World Championship in Mysłowice, Poland Finishing in 9th place. She also played with Martha Revuelta in 2005, and with Vanessa Virgen finishing 25th at the 2006 FIVB Women's International Acapulco Tournament.

She also played for the U-20 Mexico indoor women's national volleyball team in the 2006 NORCECA Women´s Junior Continental Championship U-20 as setter. Her team finished in 6th. place.
