= Ana Richa =

Brazilian beach volleyball player

Personal information
- Full name: Ana Maria Richa Medeiros
- Born: December 3, 1966 (age 59); Rio de Janeiro, Brazil
- Height: 1.75 m (5 ft 9 in)

Beach volleyball information
Teammate
Larissa França

Indoor volleyball information
- Position: Setter
- Number: 11 (1984); 6 (1988)

National team
1984–1990	Brazil
Honours
Women's beach volleyball
Representing Brazil
Pan American Games
Bronze medal – third place	2003 Santo Domingo	Beach
Women's volleyball
Representing Brazil
Goodwill Games
Bronze medal – third place	1990 Seattle
CSV South American Championship
Silver medal – second place	1985 Caracas
Silver medal – second place	1987 Punta del Este
Silver medal – second place	1989 Curitiba

Ana Maria Richa Medeiros (born December 3, 1966) is a Brazilian retired beach volleyball player who won the bronze medal in the women's beach team competition at the 2003 Pan American Games in Santo Domingo, Dominican Republic, partnering with Larissa França.

== Indoor volleyball ==
In the 1980s, Richa was a member of the Brazilian women's national volleyball team, competing at the 1984 (Los Angeles, California) and 1988 Summer Olympics (Seoul, South Korea). She also represented Brazil at the 1990 Goodwill Games in Seattle, Washington.
