= Wanda Guenette =

Canadian volleyball player (born 1962)

Personal information
- Born: August 31, 1962 (age 64); Winnipeg, Manitoba, Canada
Honours
Women's volleyball
Representing Canada
Pan American Games
Bronze medal – third place	1995 Mar del Plata	Team

Wanda Guenette (born August 31, 1962 in Winnipeg, Manitoba) is a retired Canadian female volleyball player, who competed in both indoor volleyball and beach volleyball. She was part of Team Canada at the 1996 Summer Olympics in Atlanta, Georgia, which is the last time the Canadian Women's team qualified for the Olympics. They finished 9th.

Guenette won a Canadian University Championship with the University of Winnipeg in 1983.

She was a member of Team Canada at three Pan American Games, two World Cups, five NORCECA Championships, as well as the 1996 Olympics. Guenette was part of the Canadian team that won bronze at the 1995 Pan American Games in Mar del Plata, Argentina.

After her indoor career, Guenette turned to beach volleyball and competed at the 2003 Pan American Games in Santo Domingo, Dominican Republic, where she and Nancy Gougeon finished 4th.

She was inducted into the Manitoba Sports Hall of Fame and Museum in 2014. Guenette was inducted into Volleyball Canada's Hall of Fame in 2025.
