= Mayra Huerta =

Mexican beach volleyball player (born 1970)

Personal information
- Full name: Mayra Yaratzeth Huerta Hernández
- Born: September 14, 1970 (age 56); Morelia, Mexico
- Height: 5 ft 10 in (178 cm)
Honours
Women's beach volleyball
Representing Mexico
Pan American Games
Bronze medal – third place	1999 Winnipeg	Beach
Central American and Caribbean Games
Gold medal – first place	1998 Maracaibo	Beach

Mayra Yaratzeth Huerta Hernández (born September 14, 1970, in Morelia) is a retired beach volleyball player from Mexico who won the bronze medal in the women's beach team competition at the 1999 Pan American Games in Winnipeg, Manitoba, Canada, partnering with Laura Almaral. She represented her native country at the 1996 Summer Olympics in Atlanta, Georgia.
