= NORCECA Beach Volleyball Circuit 2008 =

Volleyball competitions held in North America

Tournament details
- Host country: various
- Dates: March – June, 2008
- Venue: various (in 7 host cities)

The 2008 NORCECA Beach Volleyball Circuit is a North American beach volleyball tour. The tour consists of seven tournaments with both genders.

== Tournaments ==
- Presidente Light Boca Chica Tournament, in Boca Chica, Dominican Republic – 19–24 March 2008
- Guatemala Beach Volleyball Tournament, in Guatemala City, Guatemala – 16–21 April 2008
- El Salvador Beach Volleyball Tournament, in San Salvador, El Salvador – 23–28 April 2008
- Maeva Manzanillo Beach Volleyball Tournament, in Manzanillo, Colima, Mexico – 30 April – 5 May 2008
- Guadalajara Beach Volleyball Tournament, in Guadalajara, Mexico – 7–12 May 2008
- Coors Light Carolina Beach Volleyball Tournament, in Carolina, Puerto Rico – 21–26 May 2008
- Final Leg, in Port of Spain, Trinidad and Tobago – May 29 – June 2, 2008 (Canceled)

== Tournament results ==
=== Women ===
Event:	Gold:	Silver:	Bronze:
Presidente Light Boca Chica Tournament	(Cuba) Canet - Sinal	(Costa Rica) Morales - Alfaro	(Puerto Rico) López - Ramos
Guatemala Beach Volleyball Tournament	(Mexico) Candelas - García	(Cuba) Canet - Sinal	(Puerto Rico) López - Ramos
El Salvador Beach Volleyball Tournament	(United States) Byrd - Chapek	(El Salvador) Molina - Soler	(Puerto Rico) López - Ramos
Maeva Manzanillo Beach Volleyball Tournament	(Cuba) Canet - Sinal	(Mexico) Revuelta - Estrada	(Mexico) Reyes - López
Guadalajara Beach Volleyball Tournament	(Mexico) Revuelta - Estrada	(Mexico) Reyes - Gaxiola	(Cuba) Canet - Sinal
Coors Light Carolina Beach Volleyball Tournament	(United States) Byrd - Chapek	(Mexico) Revuelta - Estrada	(Puerto Rico) Santiago - Conley
Final Leg (Canceled)			

=== Men ===
Event:	Gold:	Silver:	Bronze:
Presidente Light Boca Chica Tournament	(United States) Ratledge - Fischer	(Puerto Rico) Irrizarry - Rodríguez	(Jamaica) Lewis - Wilson
Guatemala Beach Volleyball Tournament	(Mexico) Virgen - Miramontes	(Cuba) Kindelán - Munder	(Puerto Rico) Irrizarry - Rodríguez
El Salvador Beach Volleyball Tournament	(United States) Ratledge - Fischer	(Puerto Rico) Irrizarry - Rodríguez	(El Salvador) Medrano - Vargas
Maeva Manzanillo Beach Volleyball Tournament	(Cuba) Kindelán - Munder	(Puerto Rico) Irrizarry - Rodríguez	(Canada) Hall - Chisholm
Guadalajara Beach Volleyball Tournament	(Cuba) Kindelán - Munder	(Puerto Rico) Irrizarry - Rodríguez	(Mexico) Flores - García
Coors Light Carolina Beach Volleyball Tournament	(Puerto Rico) Papaleo - Hernández	(Puerto Rico) Otero - Rivera	(Puerto Rico) Irrizarry - Rodríguez
Final Leg (Canceled)			

== Medal table by country ==
Medal table as of June 5, 2008.

Position	Country:	Gold:	Silver:	Bronze:	Total:
1.	Cuba	4	2	1	7
2.	USA	4	0	0	4
3.	Mexico	3	3	2	8
4.	Puerto Rico	1	5	6	12
5.	El Salvador	0	1	1	2
6.	Costa Rica	0	1	0	1
7.	Jamaica	0	0	1	1
7.	Canada	0	0	1	1
