= Paulette Cruz =

Mexican beach volleyball player (born 1989)

Personal information
- Born: January 8, 1989 (age 37); Colima, Colima, Mexico
- Hometown: Colima, Colima, Mexico

Beach volleyball information

Current teammate
Years	Teammate	Tours (points)
2009	Vanessa Virgen	480
Honours
Women's beach volleyball
Representing Cuba
NORCECA Beach Volleyball Circuit
Silver medal – second place	Caymand Islands 2009	Beach
Bronze medal – third place	Boca Chica 2009	Beach

Paulette Cruz (born January 8, 1989, in Colima, Colima) is a beach volleyball player from Mexico, who competed in the Qualification Tournament of the Swatch FIVB World Tour 2006, playing with Wendy Guizar; they finished 41st overall.

She played at the 2009 NORCECA Caymand Islands Tournament with Vanessa Virgen, winning the silver medal, and later won the bronze at the Boca Chica Tournament, in the Dominican Republic.
