= Yewddys Pérez =

Dominican volleyball player

Personal information
- Full name: Yewddys Bolivar Pérez Ventura
- Nickname: Yeye
- Nationality: Dominican Republic
- Born: February 21, 1984 (age 42)
Beach volleyball information
Current teammate
- Years: Teammate
- 2010: (Francisco Abreu 2006 Cartagena Colombia)-Germán Recio
Previous teammates
- Years: Teammate
- 2005: Charlin Vargas
Honours
Bronce Norceca Boca Chica - 2010
Men's beach volleyball
Representing Dominican Republic
NORCECA Beach Volleyball Circuit
Bronze medal – third place	2009 Montelimar	Beach Bronce Norceca Boca Chica - 2010
- Updated on September 2010

Yewddys Bolivar Pérez Ventura (born February 21, 1984) is a male volleyball and beach volleyball player from Dominican Republic, who participated in the men's beach team competition at the 2006 Central American and Caribbean Games in Cartagena, Colombia, partnering Francisco Abreu.(Panamerican Game in Rio Janeiro Brazil 2007 - Partnering Alejandro Salas ). Central Amecan and Caribbean Game Mayaguez Puerto Rico 2010 - Partnering (German Recio). Panamerican Game - Veracruz Mexico 2011 . Partnering (German Recio ) He represented his native country at the 2006 NORCECA Men’s Beach Volleyball Continental Championship with Charlin Vargas.

He also competed at the 2007 NORCECA Beach Volleyball Circuit with Juan Antonio Pozo; in 2008 with Francisco Abreu and Charlin Vargas; and 2009 with Germán Recio.

At the Dominican Beach Tour 2008, he won two silver medals, playing with Dagonin Contreras.

At indoor volleyball, he earned two second places with Bahoruco at the Dominican Republic Volleyball League.

== Clubs ==
- (Dominican Republic) Tamayo-Bahoruco (2002–2011)
