= Dariam Acevedo =

Puerto Rican volleyball player (born 1984)

Personal information
- Full name: Dariam Acevedo Santiago
- Nationality: Puerto Rican
- Born: December 15, 1984 (age 41); Trujillo Alto, Puerto Rico
- Hometown: Trujillo Alto
- Height: 1.77 m (5 ft 10 in)
- Weight: 68 kg (150 lb)

Beach volleyball information

Current teammate
Years	Teammate
2009	Yarleen Santiago
Honours
Women's beach volleyball
Representing Puerto Rico
NORCECA Beach Volleyball Circuit
Gold medal – first place	2009 Montelimar	Beach
Silver medal – second place	2009 Jamaica	Beach

Dariam Acevedo Santiago (born December 15, 1984, in Trujillo Alto) is a female beach volleyball player from Puerto Rico who won the gold medal at the NORCECA Circuit 2009 at Montelimar, Nicaragua playing with Yarleen Santiago.

Acevedo majored in kinesiology at University of Texas at Austin and played as outside hitter. There she earned two times All Conference All Academic First team between 2004 and 2005 and All Conference All Academic Second Team in 2006. She also won All Conference Honorable Mention in 2004, same year she won Conference newcomer of the Year. In 2005, she won CoSIDA Academic All-District All Academic.

== Indoor ==
Acevedo later played indoor volleyball with the Puerto Rico national team and with Mets de Guaynabo from Liga de Voleibol Superior Femenino. She participated at the 2002 FIVB Volleyball Women's World Championship in Germany.

== Clubs ==
- (Puerto Rico) Chicas de San Juan (1996–1999)
- (Puerto Rico) Criollas de Caguas (2007–2008)
- (Puerto Rico) Mets de Guaynabo (2009)
- (Puerto Rico) Criollas de Caguas (2015)

== Awards ==
=== College ===
- 2004 All Conference Honorable Mention
- 2004 Conference Newcomer of the Year
- 2004-2005 All Conference "All Academic First Team"
- 2005 CoSIDA Academic All-District
- 2006 All Conference "All Academic Second Team"

=== National team ===
- NORCECA Beach Volleyball Circuit Nicaragua 2009 Gold Medal
- NORCECA Beach Volleyball Circuit Jamaica 2009 Silver Medal
