= Frida Larios =

Costa Rican artist

Frida Larios (born 1974 Costa Rica) is a Central American visual and sculptural artist best known for her typo-graphic art and research related to Maya language systems.

== Early life and education ==
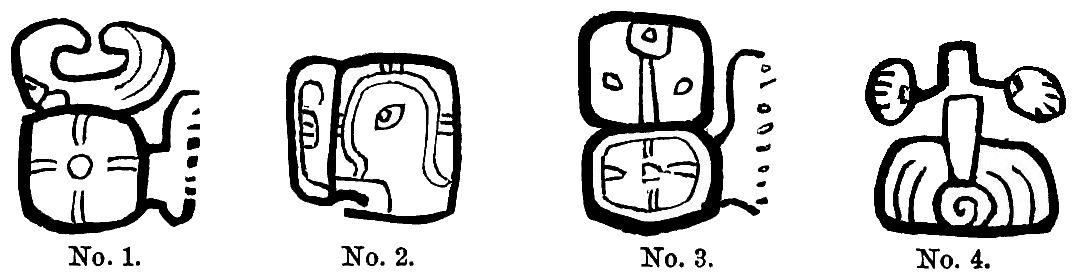
Mayan Glyphs

Frida Larios was born in Costa Rica and raised in El Salvador where she was enrolled in a German, Spanish, and English language school. As a young adult in El Salvador, Larios attended the applied arts school Escuela de Artes Aplicadas before earning her Bachelor of Arts at the Falmouth College of Art and Design in 1999. In 2003 Larios was awarded a $28,000 scholarship from FANTEL/LASPAU for Masters in Arts degree completion at the University of the Arts London in the United Kingdom.

== Career ==
Larios’s work regarding Maya script was first featured in the Design book Logo Design Volume 2, by Julius Weisemann and published by Taschen in 2009. In 2016 Larios' work was showcased at the American University Museum widely acclaimed exhibition titled The Looking Glass: Artist Immigrants of Washington, which curated the work of ten immigrant Latin American artists. The Washington City Paper art critic noted that Larios "puts an interesting twist on immigration by revisiting the Mayans. Pulling from their hieroglyphic script, she has developed a series of pictoglyphs—converted into relief sculpture and vinyl installations—that riff on creation stories and Mayan myth: part re-telling, part re-invention."

In 2017 Larios became an Adjunct Professorial Lecturer at the University of the District of Columbia in Washington, DC. In addition, 2017 saw Larios exhibit her first solo show titled Maya Alphabet of Modern Times at the Katzen Arts Center.

In the year following her solo show Maya Alphabet of Modern Times (2017) at the Katzen Arts Center, Larios participated in another exhibition titled Immortal Cacao Tree & Animales Interiores at The Peale Center museum in Baltimore (2018). Larios has since gone on to present her Animales Interiores exhibit for the Press Preview of the Molina Family Latino Gallery at the Smithsonian National Museum of American History, Washington, DC (2018). In both 2018 and 2019, Larios was featured as a solo guest artist in the Day of the Dead exhibitions at the Smithsonian National Museum of American History.

Larios designed the Lima 2019 inauguration ceremony uniforms for the PanAmerican games worn by over 80 members of the Olympic Committee of El Salvador.
