= Iván Pineda =

Mexican footballer (born 1992)

Ivan Pineda
Personal information
- Full name: Juan Carlos Iván Pineda Vázquez
- Date of birth: 22 July 1992 (age 34)
- Place of birth: Ciudad Victoria, Tamaulipas, Mexico
- Height: 1.75 m (5 ft 9 in)
- Position: Defender

Senior career*
Years	Team	Apps	(Gls)
2010–2011	Pachuca	0	(0)
2011–2016	León	50	(0)
2015	→ Atlas (loan)	5	(0)
2016	→ Juárez (loan)	1	(0)
2017	Tlaxcala	7	(0)
2017–2025	UAT	93	(2)
2018–2019	→ Zacatecas (loan)	11	(0)
- * Club domestic league appearances and goals as of 12 April 2022

Juan Carlos Iván Pineda Vázquez (born 22 July 1992) is a Mexican professional footballer who plays as a defender.
