= Juan Rossell =

Cuban beach volleyball player (born 1969)

Personal information
- Full name: Juan Miguel Rossell Milanes
- Born: December 28, 1969 (age 56); Jiguani, Granma, Cuba
- Height: 6 ft 2 in (188 cm)

Beach volleyball information
Teammate
Francisco Alvarez
Honours
Men's beach volleyball
Representing Cuba
Pan American Games
Gold medal – first place	2003 Santo Domingo	Beach

Juan Miguel Rossell Milanes (born December 28, 1969) is a beach volleyball player from Cuba who won the gold medal in the men's beach team competition at the 2003 Pan American Games in Santo Domingo, Dominican Republic, partnering with Francisco Alvarez. He represented his native country at the 1996 and the 2004 Summer Olympics.
