= Dany Wilson =

Jamaican beach volleyball and volleyball player

Personal information
- Nationality: Jamaica
- Born: 10 December 1982; Westmoreland, Jamaica
- Died: 13 December 2011 (aged 29); Montego Bay, St. James, Jamaica
- Hometown: Westmoreland
- Height: 2.00 m (6 ft 6 1/2 in)
- Weight: 90 kg (200 lb)

Beach volleyball information

Current teammate
Years	Teammate
2009	Mark Lewis
Honours
Men's beach volleyball
Representing Jamaica
NORCECA Beach Volleyball Circuit
Silver medal – second place	2009 Nicaragua	Beach
Silver medal – second place	2009 Jamaica	Beach
Bronze medal – third place	2008 Boca Chica	Beach

Dany Wilson (10 December 1982 in Westmoreland – 13 December 2011 in Montego Bay) was a male beach volleyball and volleyball player from Jamaica, who won the silver medal in the men's competition in home soil at the NORCECA Beach Volleyball Circuit 2009 in Jamaica) and the bronze medal at Boca Chica, Dominican Republic, partnering Mark Lewis in 2008.

In Indoor volleyball, he helped his national team to finish in 3rd place 2007 at the 2010 FIVB Men's World Championship qualification NORCECA Pool D in Kingston, Jamaica.

== Clubs ==
- (Jamaica) Vikings

== Awards ==
=== National team ===
- NORCECA Beach Volleyball Circuit Nicaragua 2009 Silver Medal
- NORCECA Beach Volleyball Circuit Jamaica 2009 Silver Medal
- NORCECA Beach Volleyball Circuit Boca Chica 2008 Bronze Medal
- Sizzlin Sand Beach Volleyball Tour 2008 Barbados Silver Medal
- Sizzlin Sand Beach Volleyball Tour 2007 Antigua Gold Medal
