= Roberto Rodríguez (volleyball) =

Puerto Rican beach volleyball player (born 1986)

Personal information
- Full name: Roberto Rodríguez-Bertrán
- Nickname: Rafu
- Nationality: Puerto Rico
- Born: August 8, 1986 (age 40); Puerto Rico
- Hometown: Guaynabo, Puerto Rico

Beach volleyball information

Current teammate
Years	Teammate	Tours (points)
2009	Orlando Irrizarry	310

Previous teammates
Years	Teammate	Tours (points)
2006	Christopher Underwood	30
Honours
Men's beach volleyball
Representing Puerto Rico
NORCECA Beach Volleyball Circuit
Silver medal – second place	Tijuana 2009	Beach
Silver medal – second place	Boca Chica 2008	Beach
Silver medal – second place	San Salvador 2008	Beach
Silver medal – second place	Manzanillo 2008	Beach
Silver medal – second place	Guadalajara 2008	Beach
Bronze medal – third place	Kingston 2009	Beach
Bronze medal – third place	Guatemala 2009	Beach
Bronze medal – third place	Boca Chica 2009	Beach
Bronze medal – third place	Guatemala 2008	Beach
Bronze medal – third place	Carolina 2008	Beach

Roberto "Rafu" Rodríguez-Bertrán (born August 8, 1986) is a professional beach volleyball player from Puerto Rico who currently competes on the NORCECA Beach Volleyball Circuit. He competes with Orlando Irrizarry.

Representing his home country at the Swatch FIVB World Tour during the 2006 season, playing with Christopher Underwood, they accumulated 30 points.

He also played at the AVP Young Guns 2009 at Fort Lauderdale finishing in 7th place.
