= Orlando Irizarry =

Puerto Rican beach volleyball player (born 1985)

Orlando Irrizarry

Personal information
- Full name: Orlando Irizarry Camacho
- Nationality: Puerto Rico
- Born: September 27, 1985 (age 41); San Juan, Puerto Rico

Beach volleyball information

Current teammate
Years	Teammate	Tours (points)
2009	Roberto Rodríguez	310
Honours
Men's beach volleyball
Representing Puerto Rico
NORCECA Beach Volleyball Circuit
Silver medal – second place	2009 Tijuana	Beach
Silver medal – second place	2008 Boca Chica	Beach
Silver medal – second place	2008 San Salvador	Beach
Silver medal – second place	2008 Manzanillo	Beach
Silver medal – second place	2008 Guadalajara	Beach
Bronze medal – third place	2009 Kingston	Beach
Bronze medal – third place	2009 Guatemala	Beach
Bronze medal – third place	2009 Boca Chica	Beach
Bronze medal – third place	2008 Guatemala	Beach
Bronze medal – third place	2008 Carolina	Beach

Orlando Irizarry Camacho (born September 27, 1985) is a professional male beach volleyball player from Puerto Rico who currently competes on the NORCECA Beach Volleyball Circuit. He competes with Roberto Rodríguez.

He also played at the AVP Young Guns 2009 at Fort Lauderdale finishing in the 7th place.

At his college University of the Sacred Heart where he plays indoor volleyball as a setter, he was awarded for academic excellence.
