= Laura Molina (beach volleyball) =

Salvadoran beach volleyball player (born 1986)

Personal information
- Full name: Laura Molina
- Born: December 11, 1986 (age 39); El Salvador
- Hometown: El Salvador
- Height: 180 cm (5 ft 11 in)

Beach volleyball information

Current teammate
Teammate
Yvonne Soler
Honours
Women's beach volleyball
Representing El Salvador
NORCECA Beach Volleyball Circuit
Silver medal – second place	2008 El Salvador	Beach

Laura Molina (born December 11, 1986) is a beach volleyball player from El Salvador, who represented her native country at the 2007 Pan American Games in Rio de Janeiro, Brazil. She also represented her home country at the 2006 Central American and Caribbean Games in Cartagena, Colombia, partnering Diana Romero.

She also played at the NORCECA Beach Volleyball Circuit in 2007, 2008 and 2009.
