= Vanessa Virgen =

Mexican beach volleyball player (born 1984)

Personal information
- Full name: Vanessa Virgen Zepeda
- Born: July 11, 1984 (age 42) Manzanillo, Colima, Mexico
- Home town: Manzanillo, Colima, Mexico
- Height: 172 cm (5 ft 8 in)
- Weight: 69 kg (152 lb)
Beach volleyball information
Current teammate
Years	Teammate	Tours (points)
2009	Paulette Cruz	480
Honours
Women's volleyball
Representing Mexico
Central American and Caribbean Games
Silver medal – second place	2006 Cartagena	Beach
NORCECA Beach Volleyball Circuit
Silver medal – second place	2009 Caymand Islands	Beach
Bronze medal – third place	2009 Boca Chica	Beach

Vanessa Virgen Zepeda (born July 11, 1984, in Manzanillo, Colima) is a female beach volleyball player from Mexico, who played during the Swatch FIVB World Tour 2005 playing with Alejandra Acosta and 2006, playing with Diana Estrada.

She also represented her home country at the 2006 Central American and Caribbean Games partnering Martha Revuelta and winning the silver medal.
At the NORCECA Beach Volleyball Circuit 2008 she claimed three times the 4th place.

She claimed her first podium and the 2nd place at the 2009 NORCECA Caymand Islands Tournament playing with Paulette Cruz, whom she conquered some weeks later the 3rd place at the Boca Chica Tournament, in Dominican Republic.

== Indoor ==
She also played indoor volleyball during the 2007 year, playing the Pan American Cup and the tournament during the Pan American Games.
