= Anna Ramírez (beach volleyball) =

Guatemalan beach volleyball player (born 1984)

Personal information
- Full name: Anna Lourdes Ramírez Sarti
- Nickname: Lula
- Nationality: Guatemala
- Born: June 11, 1984 (age 42); Guatemala City, Guatemala
- Hometown: Guatemala City, Guatemala
- Height: 173 cm (5 ft 8 in)
- Weight: 56 kg (123 lb)

Beach volleyball information

Current teammate
Years	Teammate	Tours (points)
2009	María Orellana	265

Anna Lourdes Ramírez Sarti (born June 11, 1984, in Guatemala City) is a female beach volleyball player from Guatemala, who played in the 2007 Pan American Games playing with María Orellana finishing ninth.

She has participated in many tournaments at the NORCECA Beach Volleyball Circuit.

She represented her native country during the 2006 Central American and Caribbean Games playing with María Orellana; they finished in the seventh position.

She won the National Championship 2009, playing with María Orellana.

She played Indoor Volleyball with her National Team at the 2006 World Championship qualifier. Her team finished fourth, not qualifying for the World Championship.
