= Rafael Vargas-Suarez =

American painter

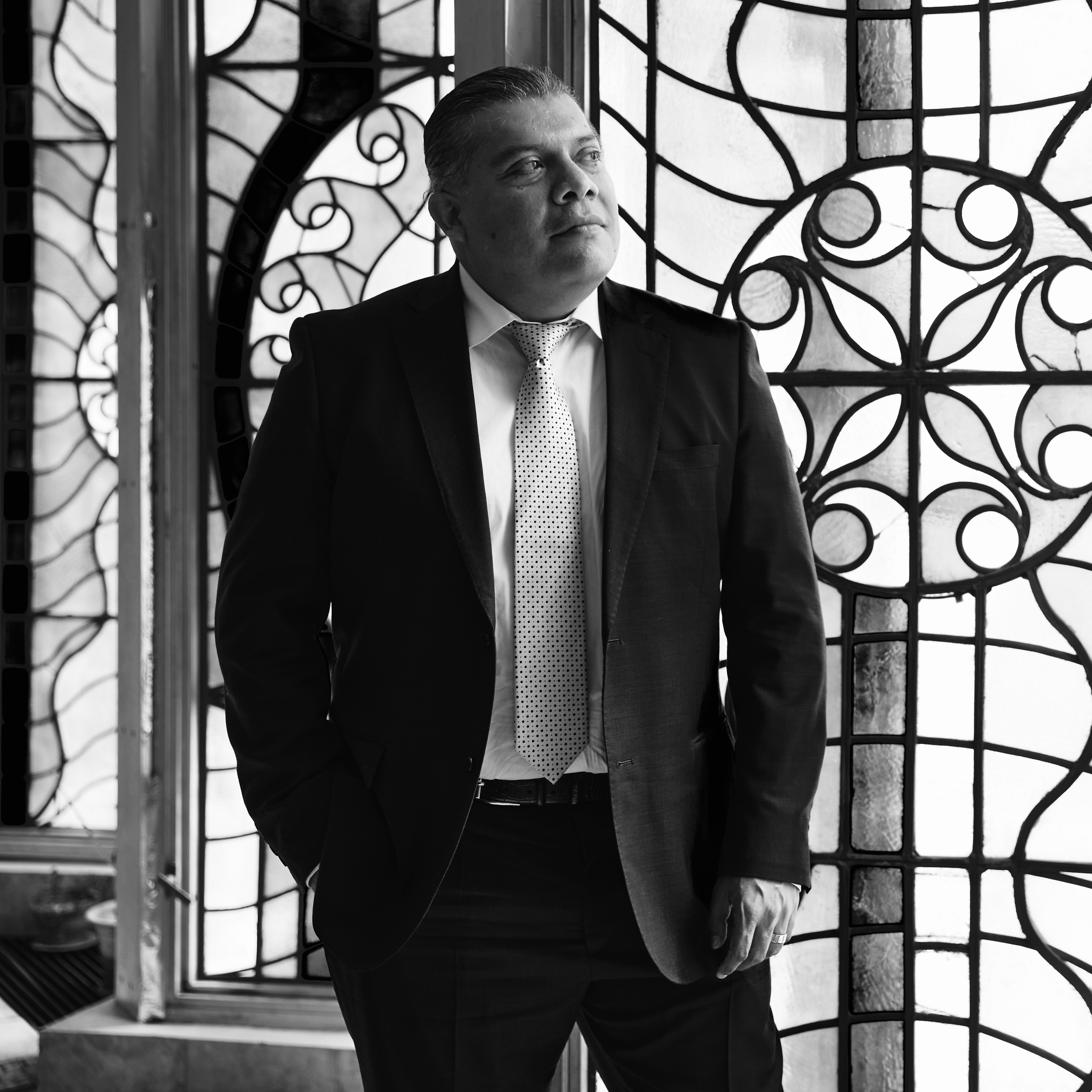
Vargas-Suarez Universal in Bishkek, Kyrgyzstan (2023)

Vargas-Suarez Universal is a Mexican-American artist known for his large-scale murals, scientific and space-inspired multimedia works, and interdisciplinary approach to art and science. His artistic practice integrates visual abstraction with scientific inquiry, often using imagery derived from space exploration, aerospace architecture, and materials science.

== Early life and education ==
Rafael Vargas-Suarez, professionally known as Vargas-Suarez Universal, was born in Mexico City in 1972 and grew up in Clear Lake City, Texas, a suburb of Houston near NASA’s Johnson Space Center. This proximity to a major hub of aerospace innovation influenced his early interest in science, technology, and structured environments. Vargas-Suarez’s familial background also contributed to his artistic development—his maternal grandfather, Miguel Suarez-Sanchez, was a musician and bandleader, and Vargas-Suarez himself was involved in music, playing drums in experimental garage bands.

His childhood fascination with aerospace was influenced by both of his parents' careers in aviation and the history of his great-uncle, Major General Rafael Suarez-Peralta, a member of the Mexican Expeditionary Air Force, Escuadron 201, during World War II, who played a significant role in Vargas-Suarez’s interest in aviation and aerospace.

Between 1991 and 1996, Vargas-Suarez attended the University of Texas at Austin, where he studied art history and astronomy. These fields laid the intellectual foundation for his later work, which bridges visual abstraction with scientific inquiry. In 1997, he moved to New York City to pursue his art career, where he began incorporating urban architecture and spaceflight data into his practice.

== Career ==
=== Early Career (1997–2000s) ===
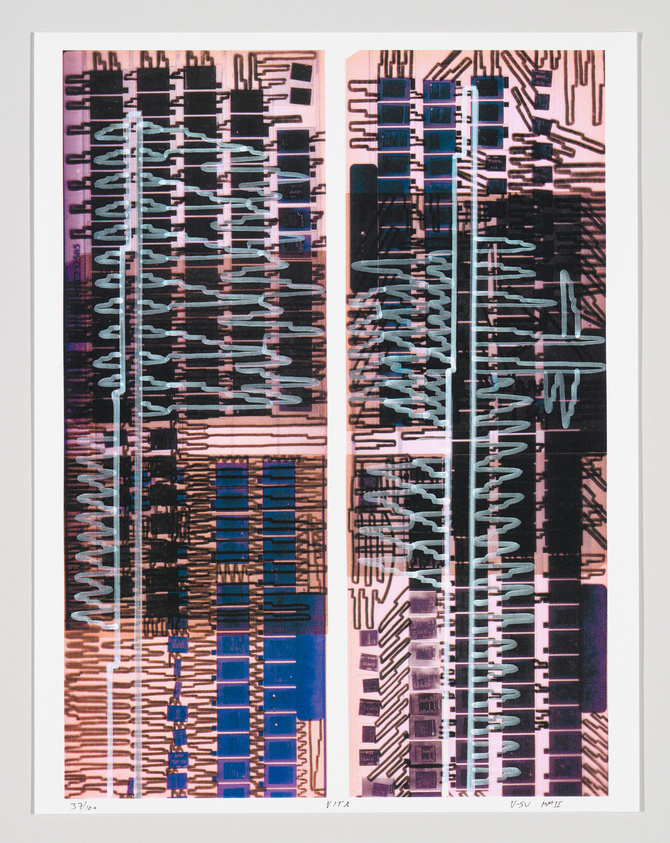
Vita (2002) laser print Dimensions Sheet: 11 × 8 1/2in. (27.9 × 21.6 cm) 10 1/2 × 7 5/8in. (26.7 × 19.4 cm) Edition of 100, Collections: Whitney Museum of American Art; Baltimore Museum of Art, Baltimore, MD; Brooklyn Museum of Art, Brooklyn, NY; Rhode Island School of Design Museum of Art, Providence, RI; Museum of Modern Art Library, New York, NY; New York Public Library; Art Institute of Chicago, Chicago, IL

After moving to New York City, Vargas-Suarez Universal began creating works that blended abstract expressionism with themes drawn from architecture and aerospace science. His early work included large-scale murals and installations, which used structural forms to express the complexities of urban life and scientific data. The artist’s signature, “Vargas-Suarez Universal,” reflects his intention to transcend borders through universal themes and interdisciplinary methods.

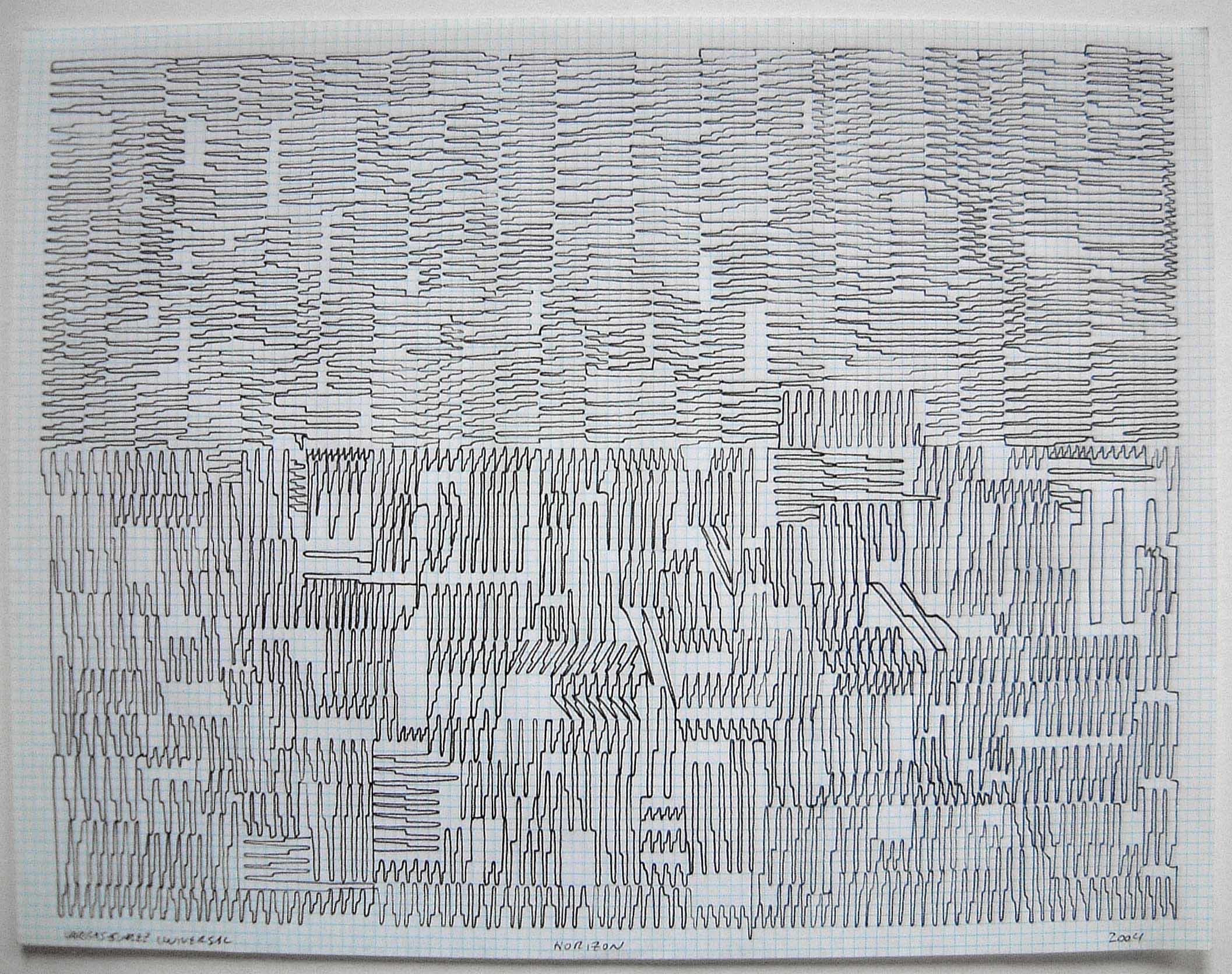
Horizon (2004) Felt tip pen on ruled graph paper 8.5 x 11 inches Collection of Parrish Art Museum, Water Mill, New York Gift of Yvonne Puffer and Sean Elwood

=== Stylistic Evolution ===
Over time, Vargas-Suarez’s artistic approach evolved to merge tactile, material forms with technological concepts. His work began incorporating mixed media—including textiles, ceramic mosaics, and digital elements—to convey the complexity of cosmological data. By blending traditional craftsmanship with imagery inspired by space, he creates a visual language that reflects the intersection of earthly and cosmic matter. His work often features the motif of a “vector,” representing direction and movement across different scales.

== Artistry and Technique ==
Vargas-Suarez Universal’s installations frequently employ digital printmaking and other mixed media, producing works that reflect the immense scale and dimensionality of space. His use of rough and smooth textures evokes the tangible essence of both physical spaces and abstract cosmic phenomena. Through his artworks, he seeks to reimagine scientific data through the lens of human experience, grounding high-tech themes in intimate, hand-crafted processes.

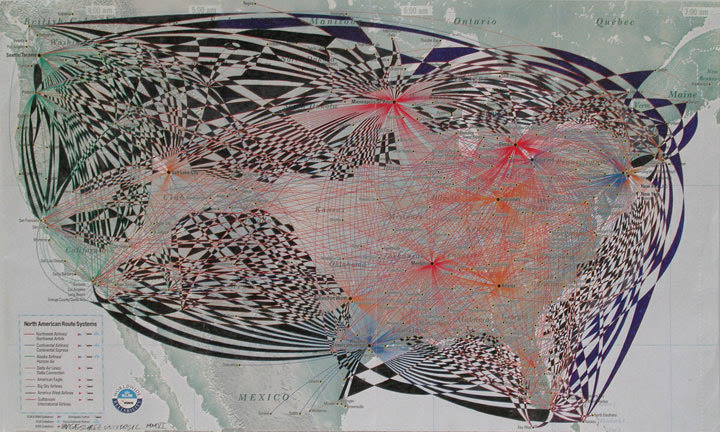
Event Horizon: North American Systems (2005–06) ink on found printed matter (Northwest Airlines/KLM routes map) 9.25 inches x 14.5 inches (unframed paper size) signed and dated on front Collection of Northern New England Museum of Contemporary Art, Burlington, VT

== Themes and Influences ==
=== Scientific and Astronomical Imagery ===
Central to Vargas-Suarez Universal’s work is the use of scientific and astronomical imagery. His works often explore complex scientific phenomena, translating them into abstract compositions that reference satellite imagery, orbital paths, and architectural blueprints. This dialogue between technological advancement and aesthetic experience explores the tension between human-scale experience and the vastness of the cosmos.

=== Architectural Inspiration ===
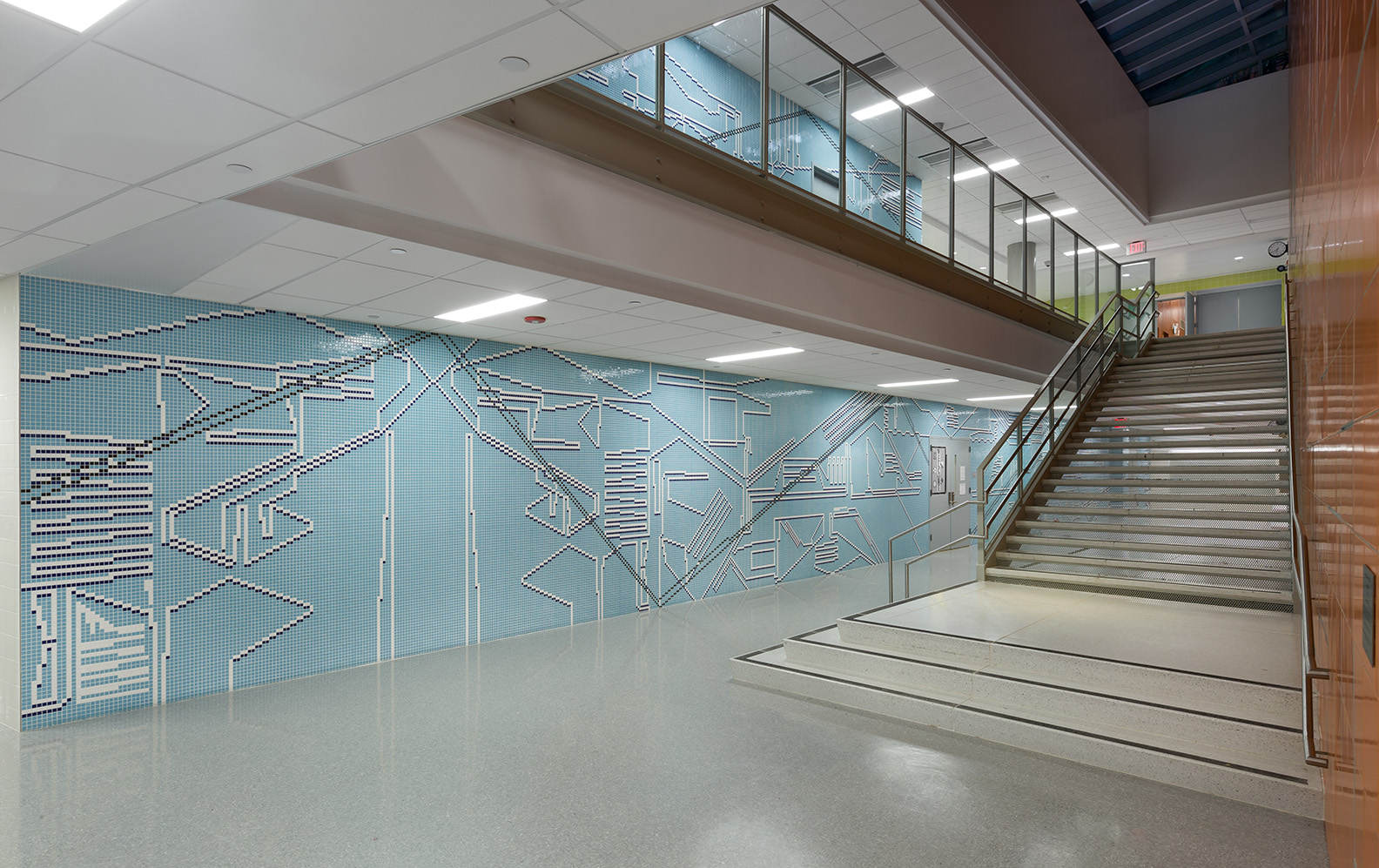
Panorama (2017) porcelain mosaic tile PS/IS 191 Riverside School for Makers and Artists, Manhattan, New York Commissioned by the NYC Department of Education & the NYC School Construction Authority, Public Art for Public Schools Program, in collaboration with the NYC Department of Cultural Affairs Percent for Art Program. Collection of the NYC Department of Education

Vargas-Suarez Universal’s work also draws heavily from modern architecture, particularly the structural language of skyscrapers, observatories, and space launch facilities. His installations and murals adopt grid-like precision and utilize color, line, and form to capture the essence of these monumental structures.

=== Multi-Media Scope of Work ===
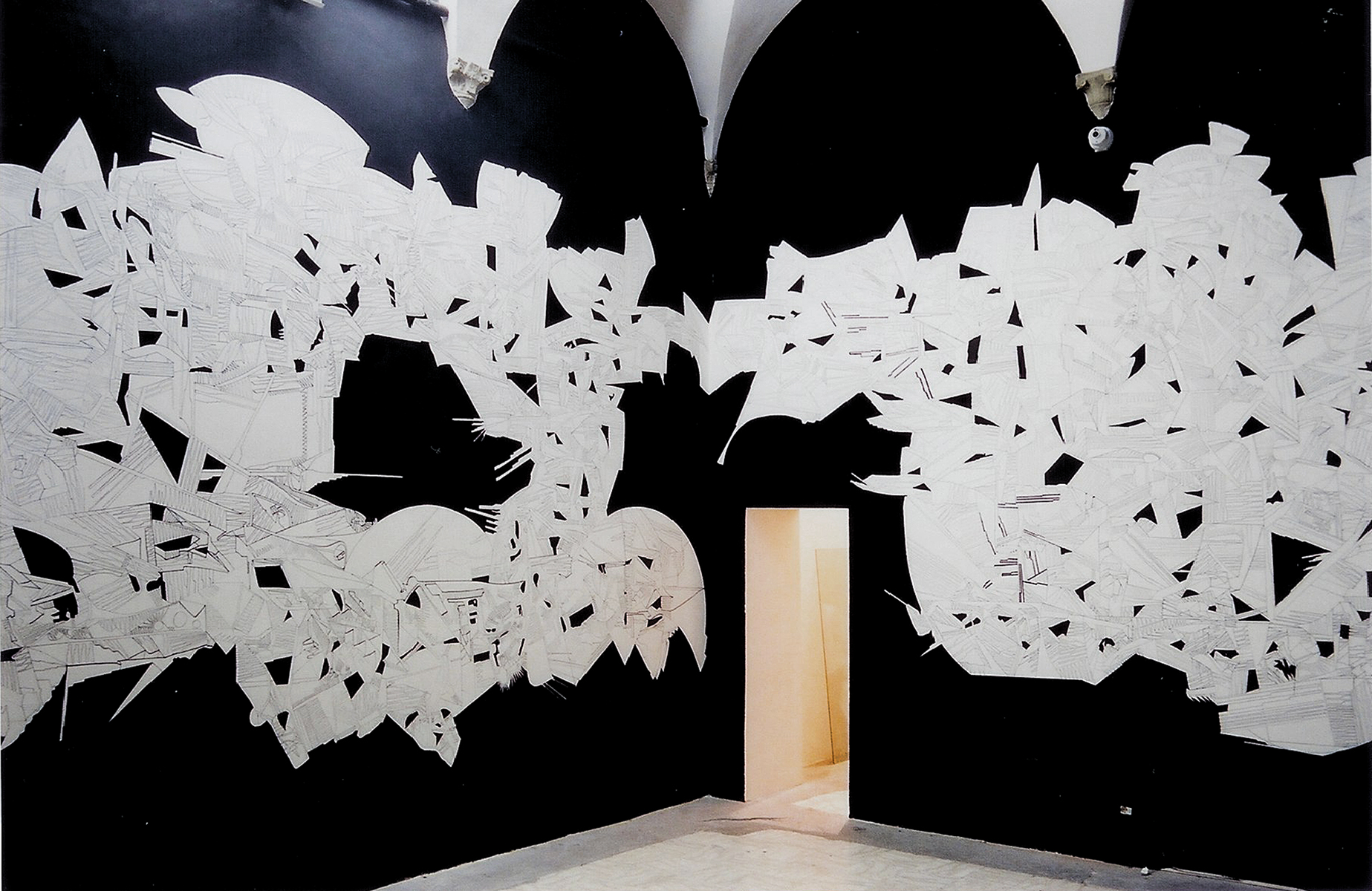
Space Station: Siena (2003) acrylic fresco/secco in-situ wall drawings 20x80 feet overall (4 walls) Palazzo delle Papesse Centro Arte Contemporanea, Siena, Italy

Vargas-Suarez has worked in a variety of mediums, including murals, works on paper, oil paintings, sound art, and multimedia installations. Below are key categories of his work:

• Murals and Large-Scale Installations: Site-specific murals integrating scientific imagery with architectural forms.

• Works on Paper: Drawings and mixed-media works exploring astronomical and geometric themes.

• Oil Paintings: Abstract interpretations of cosmology and space technology.

• Sound Art Pieces: Collaborations with composers to create sonic landscapes.

• Multimedia Installations: Digital prints, projections, and interactive elements.

== Major Exhibitions and Public Artworks ==
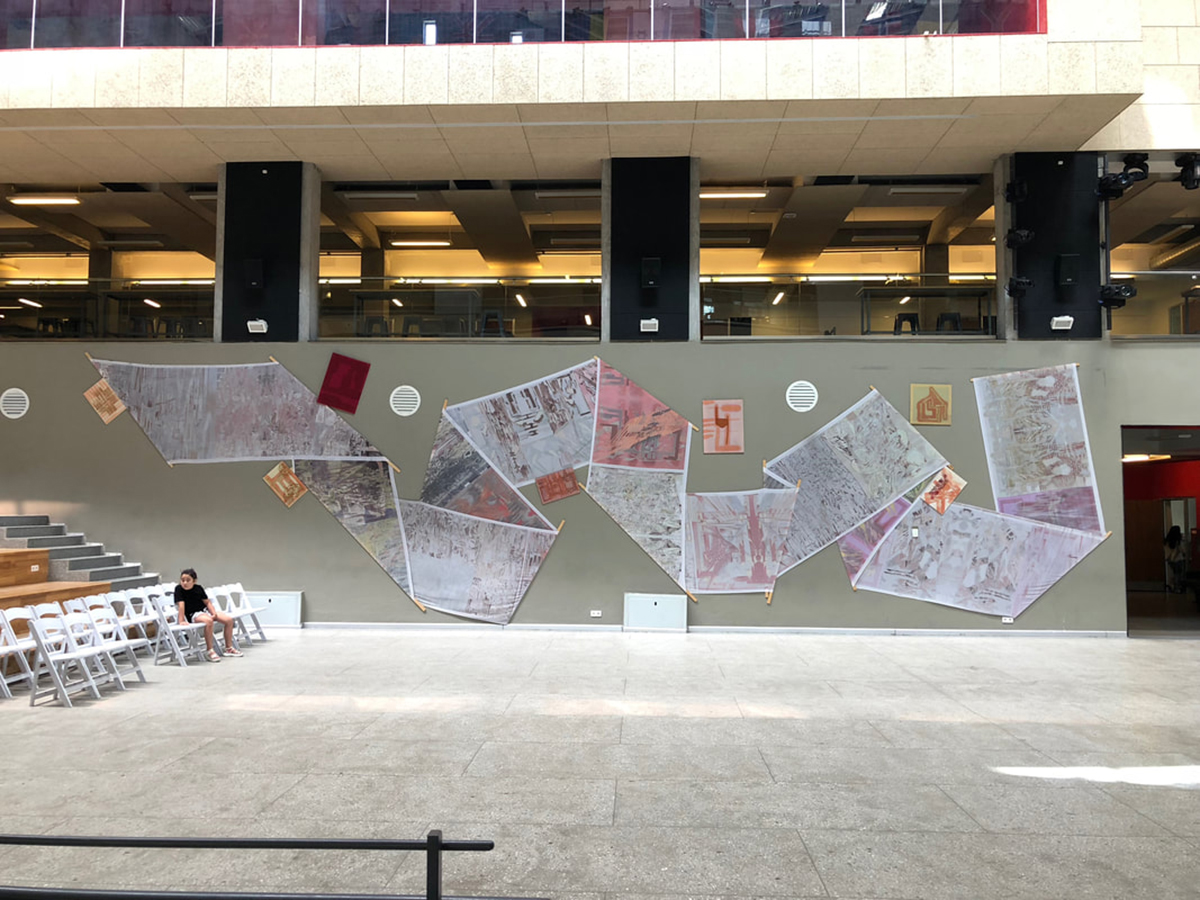
Assembly Complex (2016) (with Dilbar Ashimbaeva) hand painted and printed archival inks and silk dyes, embroidery, wood, synthetic, natural silks, wall 14x92 feet American University of Central Asia, Bishkek,

Major group exhibitions include "S-Files: The Selected Files" El Museo del Barrio, New York (2000); "Drawing the Line", Queens Museum of Art, New York (2001); "Il Palazzo della Liberta", Palazzo delle Papesse, Siena, Italy (2003); "Barrocos & Neobarrocos (El Infierno de lo Bello)", DA2 (Domus Artium 2002), Fundacion Salamanca Ciudad de Cultura, Palacio de Abrantes, Universidad de Salamanca, Salamanca, Spain (2005); 2nd Moscow Biennale of Contemporary Art: Special Projects: We Are Your Future, Winzavod Contemporary Art Centre, Moscow, Russia (2007); Trienal Poli/gráfica de San Juan, Latinoamérica y el Caribe: El Panal/The Hive, Antiguo Arsenal de la Marina Española, Viejo San Juan, Puerto Rico (2012); 30th Ljubljana Biennial of Graphic Arts, Moderna galerija Ljubljana (Museum of Modern Art Ljubljana), organized by Mednarodni Grafični Likovni Center (MGLC), Ljubljana, Slovenia; On Painting, Centro Atlántico de Arte Moderno (CAAM), Las Palmas de Gran Canaria, Spain (2013); Latinx Abstract, BRIC, Brooklyn, NY (2021); ArtBat Fest 11: The Anthropocene and Its Critique, Abay Kazakh State Academic Opera and Ballet Theater & Esentai, Almaty, Kazakhstan (2023).

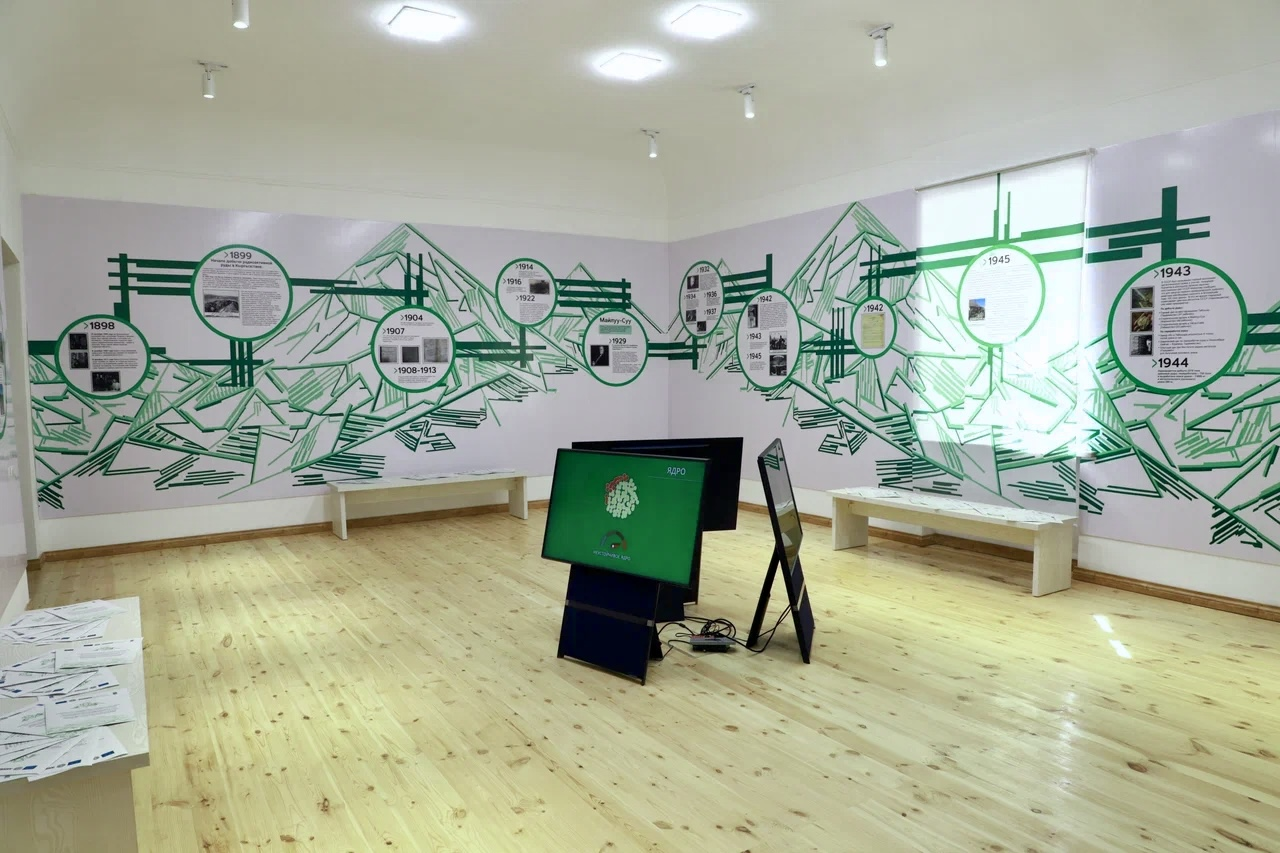
Mailuu-Suu City & Kyrgyzstan's Uranium Legacy History Museum (2021-2022) museum design commission from Organization of Security and Cooperation with Europe (OSCE) Mailuu-Suu, Jalalabad Province, Kyrgyz Republic

Recent public commissions include a project at George Bush Intercontinental Airport in Houston, Texas, and a Art in Embassies commission for the U.S. Consulate in Guadalajara, Mexico titled, "Terra Matrix", a ceramic mosaic mural. This work exemplifies his ability to translate scientific concepts into culturally resonant public art.

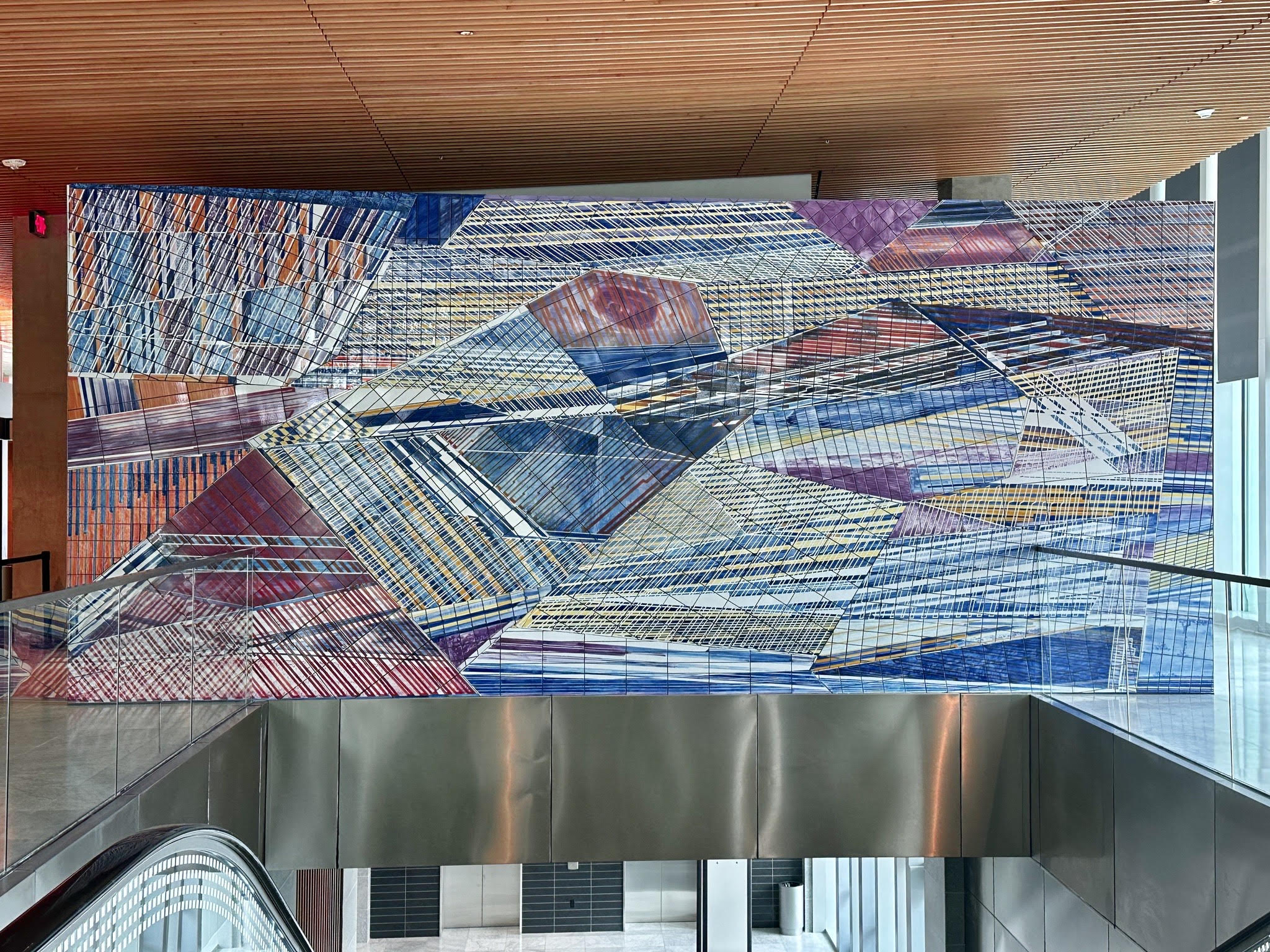
Terra Matrix (2024) 1785 hand painted, water jet cut, ceramic mosaic tiles, site-specific mural 9.5 x 30 feet commissioned by the US State Dept. Art in Embassies Program, “Democracy Collection” US Consulate, Guadalajara, Mexico Curator: Imtiaz Hafiz Fabricator: Ceramica Suro, Guadalajara, Jalisco, México

=== Collections ===
Ainsworth Collection, Sydney, Australia; American University of Central Asia, Bishkek, Kyrgyz Republic; Artist Pension Trust, New York, NY; Art in Embassies, U.S. State Department, “Democracy Collection,” U.S. Consulate, Guadalajara, Mexico; Art Institute of Chicago, Chicago, IL; Baltimore Museum of Art, Baltimore, MD; BaNorte Banco Comercial, Caracas, Venezuela; Boelsche Collection, Austin, TX; Brooklyn Museum, Brooklyn, NY; Centro Atlántico de Arte Moderno, Las Palmas de Gran Canaria, Spain; Comunidad Autónoma de la Región de Murcia, Spain; DA2 (Domus Artium 2002), Fundación Salamanca Ciudad de Cultura, Salamanca, Spain; Dieu Donné Archives, Brooklyn, NY; El Museo del Barrio, New York, NY; Fundación Canaria para el Desarrollo de la Pintura, Las Palmas de Gran Canaria, Spain; LibertyHealth Foundation, Jersey City, NJ; Jersey City Museum, Jersey City, NJ; JPMorgan Chase Art Collection; Mexic-Arte Museum, Austin, TX; Museo de Arte Contemporáneo de Castilla y León, León, Spain; Museum of Modern Art Library, New York, NY; New York City Department of Education; Northern New England Museum of Contemporary Art (NNEMoCA), Burlington, VT; PAC Art Collection, Houston, TX; Palazzo delle Papesse Centro Arte Contemporanea, Siena, Italy; Parrish Art Museum, Water Mill, NY; Queens Museum, Queens, NY; Rhode Island School of Design Museum of Art, Providence, RI; Rockpoint Group, Boston, MA; UBS Art Collection; Villardell Collection, Palma de Mallorca, Spain; Webb School of Knoxville, Visiting Artist Study Collection, Knoxville, TN; Whitney Museum of American Art, New York, NY;

=== Awards and Commissions ===
Vargas-Suarez has received multiple awards and commissions, including:

• The 1997 Young Artist Award from Bank of America and Mexic-Arte Museum, Austin, TX

• The 2012 public art commission for NYC Public Schools, PS/IS 191 Riverside School for Makers and Artists, New York

• The 2024 Art in Embassies commission for the U.S. Consulate in Guadalajara, Mexico

=== Residencies include ===
• PAC Art Residency in Houston, TX (2023–24)

• Webb School in Tennessee, Knoxville, TN (2016)

• "Workspace" Program, Dieu Donné Papermill in New York (2007)

=== Research-Based Practice ===
Vargas-Suarez Universal’s art is informed by his research at scientific institutions, including NASA Ames Research Center, Kennedy Space Center, and the Baikonur Cosmodrome. His experiences at these facilities offer firsthand exposure to space exploration technologies, which he integrates into his art practice. His studio works, including textiles and ceramic mosaics, reflect the textures and structural motifs of aerospace environments, rendered in abstract forms.

== Art Market ==
Vargas-Suarez Universal is represented by Hutchinson Modern & Contemporary
