= Leonel Munder =

Cuban beach volleyball player (born 1988)

Personal information
- Born: September 27, 1988 (age 38); Havana, Cuba
- Height: 6 ft 5 in (196 cm)
Medal record
Men's beach volleyball
Representing Cuba
Pan American Games
Bronze medal – third place	2007 Santo Domingo	Beach

Leonel Munder Misiñan (born September 27, 1988, in Havana) is a male beach volleyball player from Cuba who won the bronze medal in the men's beach team competition at the 2007 Pan American Games in Rio de Janeiro, Brazil, partnering with Francisco Álvarez.
