= 2002 Central American and Caribbean Games =

Sports events held in San Salvador, El Salvador

XIX Central American and Caribbean Games
- Host city: San Salvador
- Country: El Salvador
- Nations: 31
- Athletes: 4,301
- Events: 32
- Opening: November 22, 2002
- Closing: December 8, 2002
- Opened by: Francisco Flores Pérez
- Main venue: Estadio Nacional Flor Blanca

The 19th Central American and Caribbean Games were held in San Salvador, El Salvador from November 22 to December 8, 2002 and included 4,301 competitors from 31 nations, competing in 32 sports. The main stadium for these championships was the Estadio Nacional Flor Blanca. For political reasons, Cuba decided to boycott the event. Squash made its debut at the Central American and Caribbean Games.

== Mascots ==
The mascots were Chica the parrot, Chepe the raccoon, and Chamba the eagle.

== Host city ==
- Main host city
  - San Salvador
- Satellite venues
  - Amatitlán, Guatemala: (Canoeing)
  - Valle de Bravo, Mexico Club Náutico Avándaro (Sailing):
  - San Juan, Puerto Rico (Field Hockey):
  - Santo Domingo, Dominican Republic (racquetball and handball).

== Sports ==
- Archery
- Artistic gymnastics
- Athletics
- Badminton
- Baseball
- Basketball
- Beach Volleyball
- Bowling
- Boxing
- Canoeing
- Cycling
- Diving
- Equestrian
- Fencing
- Field hockey
- Football
- Handball
- Judo
- Karate
- Modern pentathlon
- Racquetball
- Rhythmic gymnastics
- Roller skating
- Rowing
- Sailing
- Shooting
- Softball
- Squash
- Swimming
- Synchronized swimming
- Table tennis
- Taekwondo
- Tennis
- Triathlon
- Volleyball
- Water polo
- Water skiing
- Weightlifting
- Wrestling

== Medal table ==
* Host nation (El Salvador)

2002 Central American and Caribbean Games medal table
Rank	Nation	Gold	Silver	Bronze	Total
1	Mexico	138	111	102	351
2	Venezuela	103	94	80	277
3	Colombia	62	60	57	179
4	Dominican Republic	35	38	59	132
5	Puerto Rico	30	47	57	134
6	Guatemala	22	22	42	86
7	El Salvador*	18	39	66	123
8	Jamaica	6	10	8	24
9	Trinidad and Tobago	5	1	11	17
10	Costa Rica	4	3	6	13
11	Haiti	2	2	6	10
12	Panama	2	2	2	6
13	Virgin Islands	2	0	1	3
14	Barbados	1	2	6	9
15	Suriname	1	1	2	4
16	Honduras	1	0	8	9
17	Nicaragua	1	0	4	5
18	Cayman Islands	1	0	1	2
19	British Virgin Islands	1	0	0	1
19	Saint Lucia	1	0	0	1
21	Guyana	0	1	7	8
22	Antigua and Barbuda	0	1	1	2
23	Belize	0	0	2	2
23	Netherlands Antilles	0	0	2	2
23	Saint Kitts and Nevis	0	0	2	2
26	Bahamas	0	0	1	1
26	Dominica	0	0	1	1
26	Grenada	0	0	1	1
29	Aruba	0	0	0	0
29	Bermuda	0	0	0	0
29	Saint Vincent and the Grenadines	0	0	0	0
Totals (31 entries)		436	434	535	1,405
