= Juan Virgen =

Mexican volleyball and beach volleyball player (born 1987)

Personal information
- Full name: Juan Ramón Virgen Pulido
- Nationality: Mexican
- Born: 9 April 1987 (age 39); Santiago Ixcuintla, Nayarit
- Height: 197 cm (6 ft 6 in)
- Weight: 85 kg (187 lb)
- Spike: 340 cm (134 in)
- Block: 330 cm (130 in)

Volleyball information
- Number: 15

Career
Years	Teams
2012	Tigres UANL
Honours
Men's beach volleyball
Representing Mexico
Pan American Games
Gold medal – first place	2015 Toronto	Beach
Silver medal – second place	2019 Lima	Beach

Juan Ramón Virgen Pulido (born 9 April 1987) is a Mexican male volleyball and beach volleyball player.

With his club Tigres UANL he competed at the 2012 FIVB Volleyball Men's Club World Championship. As a beach volleyball player he competed at the 2013 Beach Volleyball World Championships and 2011 Pan American Games and 2015 Pan American Games. He qualified to compete at the 2016 Summer Olympics in Rio de Janeiro, in the men's tournament with Lombardo Ontiveros, but they lost in the Round of 16 against Reinder Nummerdor and Christiaan Varenhorst, from the Netherlands.
