= NORCECA Beach Volleyball Circuit =

Beach volleyball competition

The Norceca Beach Volleyball Circuit is a sport competition for national teams in the sport of beach volleyball.

The championship combines events for men and women, and is held annually, organized by the North, Central America and Caribbean Volleyball Confederation (NORCECA). The confederation keeps an extensive and detailed database of tournaments and events, reported at two sites, the Beach Volleyball Database and its colorful main site, norceca.net.

== Men's tournament ==
=== History ===
MEN'S NORCECA BEACH VOLLEYBALL CHAMPIONSHIP
Year	Host	Gold	Silver	Bronze
2006; Details	Boca Chica, Dominican Republic	USA	PUR	CRC

Men's NORCECA Beach Volleyball Circuit
Year	1st	2nd	3rd	4th	5th
2007; Details	USA	PUR	CRC	CUB	DOM
2008; Details	PUR	USA	CUB	CRC	GUA
2009; Details	CUB	PUR	MEX	USA	CAN
2010; Details	MEX	USA	CUB	PUR	CAN
2011; Details	MEX	PUR	DOM	CAN	GUA
2012; Details	USA	CAN	MEX	CRC	PUR
2013; Details	MEX	CAN	USA	PUR	TRI
2014; Details	CAN	USA	PUR	ESA	CUB
2015; Details	USA	CAN	TRI	CUB	GUA
2016; Details	USA	CAN	TRI	GUA	CUB
2017; Details	USA	CUB	CAN	GUA	NCA
2018; Details	CAN	USA	MEX	CUB	NCA
2019; Details	USA	NCA	CAN	MEX	GUA
2022; Details	USA	CAN	MEX	GUA	CUB
2023; Details	USA	MEX	CAN	GUA	TTO
2024; Details	USA	CAN	ISV	NCA	CRC
2025; Details	MEX	USA	CAN	NCA	ESA

== Women's tournament ==
=== History ===
Women's NORCECA Beach Volleyball Circuit
Year	1st	2nd	3rd	4th	5th
2007; Details	PUR	USA	CAN	CUB DOM	CRC
2008; Details	PUR	MEX	CUB	USA	CRC
2009; Details	MEX	CUB	USA	CRC	GUA
2010; Details	PUR	USA	CUB	CAN	CRC
2011; Details	MEX	USA	PUR	CRC	GUA
2012; Details	USA	CAN	GUA	DOM	LCA
2013; Details	USA	CAN	MEX	CRC	DOM
2014; Details	USA	CAN	CRC	MEX	CUB
2015; Details	USA	CAN	CRC	MEX	CUB
2016; Details	USA	CAN	CRC	MEX	CUB
2017; Details	CAN	USA	CUB	MEX	NCA
2018; Details	USA	CAN	MEX	CUB	NCA
2019; Details	USA	CAN	CUB	NCA	MEX
2022; Details	USA	CAN	MEX	PUR	DOM
2023; Details	USA	CAN	PUR	MEX	CRC
2024; Details	USA	CAN	GUA	NCA	ISV
2025; Details	PUR	CAN	USA	MEX	NCA
