= 2004 Major League Baseball draft =

Baseball draft of amateur players

General information
- Date: June 7–8, 2004

Overview
- 1498 total selections
- First selection: Matt Bush; San Diego Padres
- First round selections: 41

The 2004 Major League Baseball draft, was held on June 7 and 8. It was conducted via conference call with representatives from each of the league's 30 teams. The draft marked the first time three players from the same university were chosen in the first ten picks.

Source: MLB.com 2004 Draft Tracker

== First round selections ==
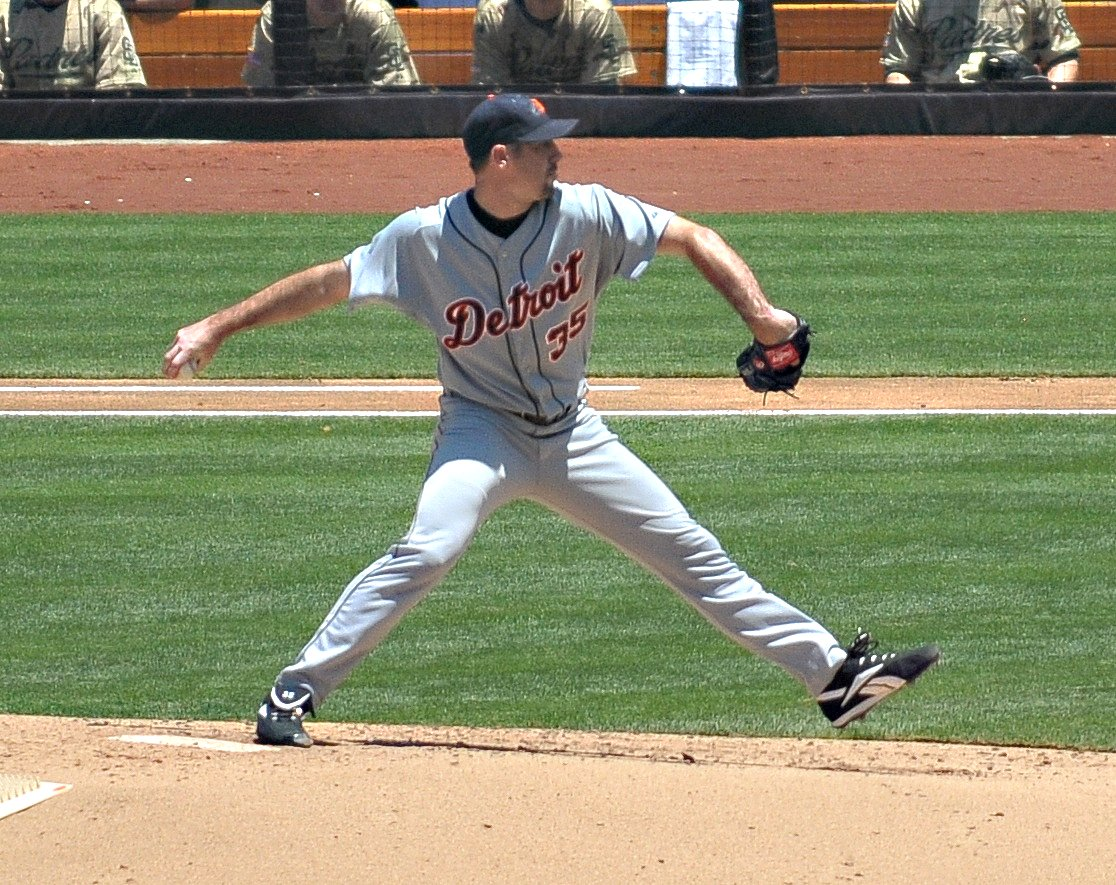
Detroit selected Justin Verlander second overall. He is a 9× All-Star, 3× AL Cy Young winner, and the 2011 AL MVP. He has led the American League in: strikeouts 5×, wins 4×, and ERA 2×.

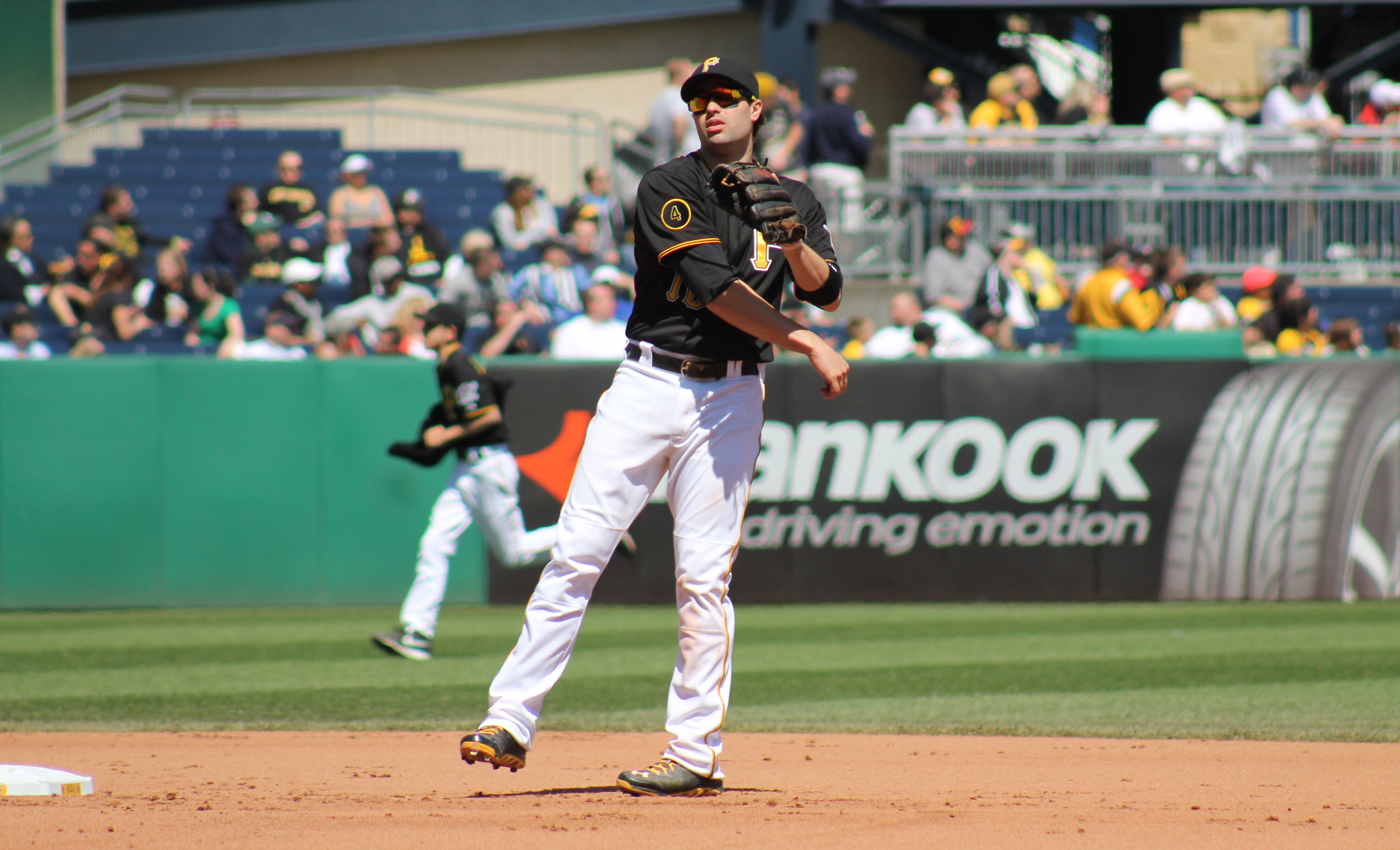
The Pirates selected Neil Walker 11th overall. He was named the 2014 Silver Slugger at second base.

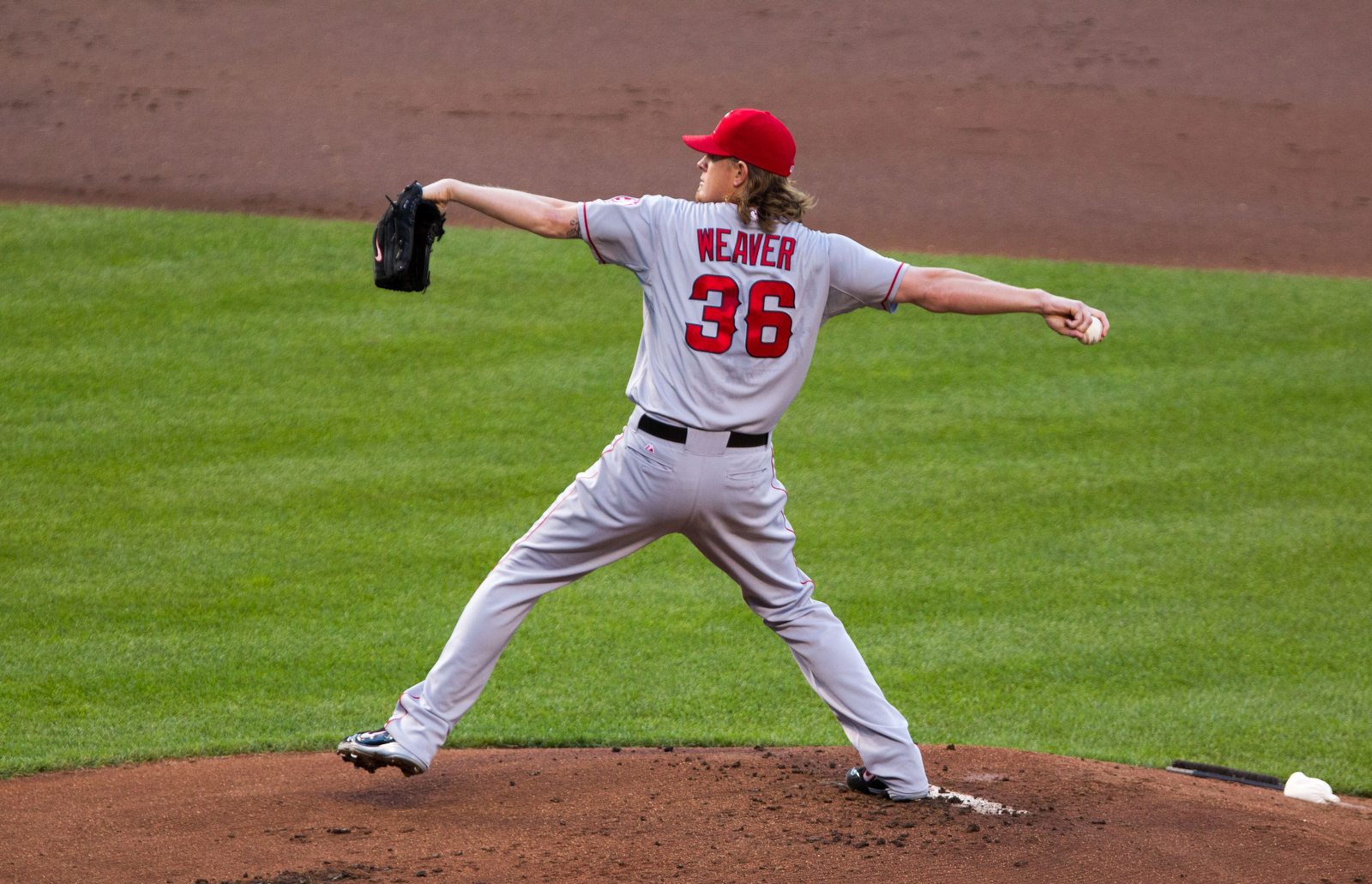
The Angels selected Jered Weaver 12th overall. The 3× All-Star led the American League in wins twice.

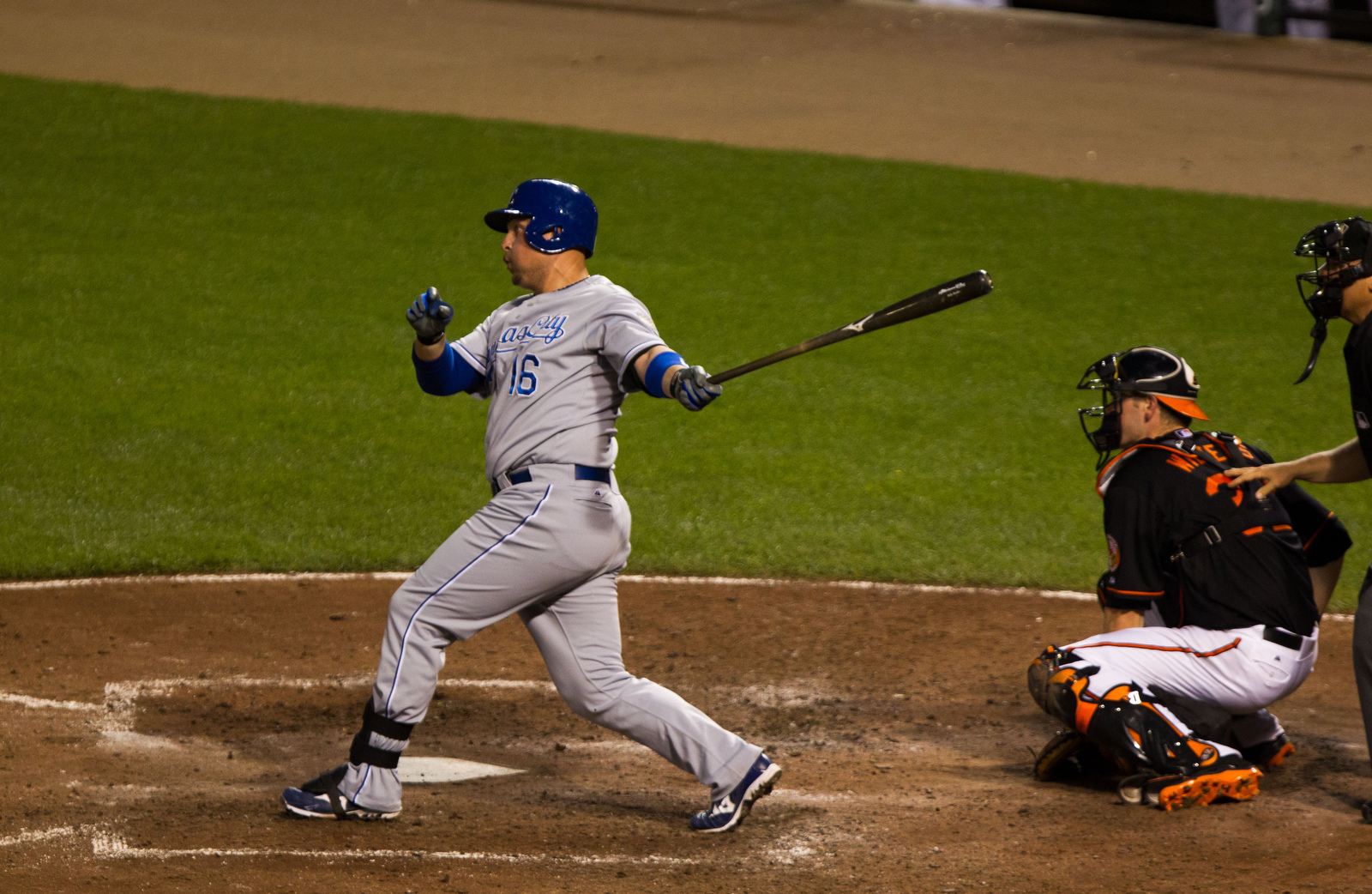
Kansas City selected Billy Butler 14th overall. In 2012, the man known as "Country Breakfast" was named an All-Star and Silver Slugger at DH

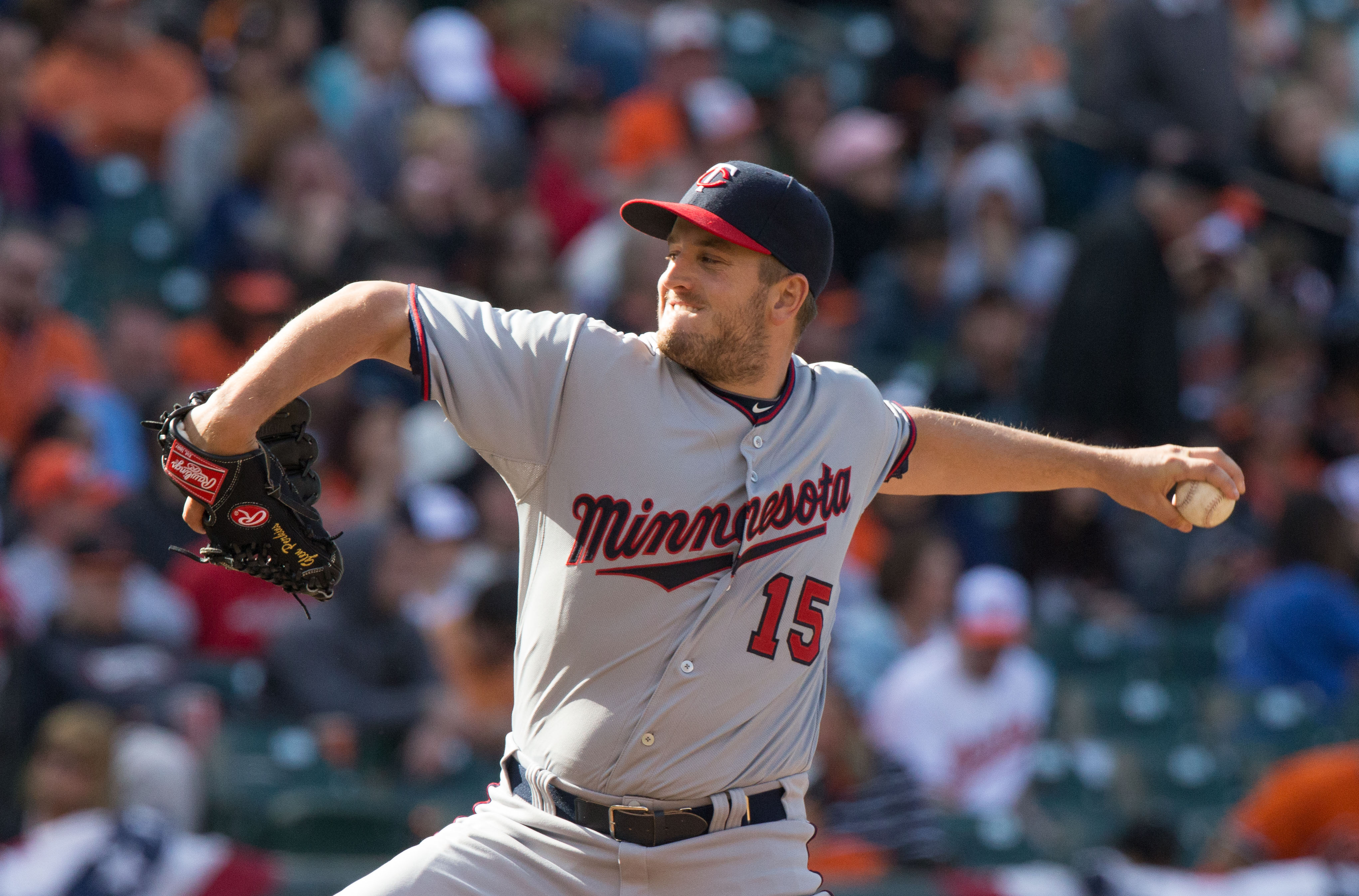
The Twins selected Glen Perkins 22nd overall. Perkins is a 3× All-Star.

| All-Star |
| Player did not sign |

| Pick | Player | Team | Position | School |
|---|---|---|---|---|
| 1 | Matt Bush | San Diego Padres | SS | Mission Bay High School (CA) |
| 2 | Justin Verlander | Detroit Tigers | RHP | Old Dominion |
| 3 | Philip Humber | New York Mets | RHP | Rice |
| 4 | Jeff Niemann | Tampa Bay Devil Rays | RHP | Rice |
| 5 | Mark Rogers | Milwaukee Brewers | RHP | Mount Ararat High School (ME) |
| 6 | Jeremy Sowers | Cleveland Indians | LHP | Vanderbilt |
| 7 | Homer Bailey | Cincinnati Reds | RHP | La Grange High School (TX) |
| 8 | Wade Townsend | Baltimore Orioles | RHP | Rice |
| 9 | Chris Nelson | Colorado Rockies | SS | Redan High School (GA) |
| 10 | Thomas Diamond | Texas Rangers | RHP | New Orleans |
| 11 | Neil Walker | Pittsburgh Pirates | C | Pine-Richland High School (PA) |
| 12 | Jered Weaver | Anaheim Angels | RHP | Long Beach State |
| 13 | Bill Bray | Montreal Expos | LHP | William & Mary |
| 14 | Billy Butler | Kansas City Royals | 3B | Wolfson High School (FL) |
| 15 | Stephen Drew | Arizona Diamondbacks | SS | Florida State |
| 16 | David Purcey | Toronto Blue Jays | LHP | Oklahoma |
| 17 | Scott Elbert | Los Angeles Dodgers | LHP | Seneca High School (MO) |
| 18 | Josh Fields | Chicago White Sox | 3B | Oklahoma State |
| 19 | Chris Lambert | St. Louis Cardinals | RHP | Boston College |
| 20 | Trevor Plouffe | Minnesota Twins | SS | Crespi Carmelite High School (CA) |
| 21 | Greg Golson | Philadelphia Phillies | CF | Connally High School (TX) |
| 22 | Glen Perkins | Minnesota Twins (Note: Pick from Seattle Mariners as compensation for signing of free agent Eddie Guardado) | LHP | Minnesota |
| 23 | Phil Hughes | New York Yankees (Note: Pick from Houston Astros as compensation for signing of free agent Andy Pettitte) | RHP | Foothill High School (CA) |
| 24 | Landon Powell | Oakland Athletics (Note: Pick from Boston Red Sox as compensation for signing of free agent Keith Foulke) | C | South Carolina |
| 25 | Kyle Waldrop | Minnesota Twins (Note: Pick from Chicago Cubs as compensation for signing of free agent LaTroy Hawkins) | RHP | Farragut High School (TN) |
| 26 | Richie Robnett | Oakland Athletics | CF | Fresno State |
| 27 | Taylor Tankersley | Florida Marlins | LHP | Alabama |
| 28 | Blake DeWitt | Los Angeles Dodgers (Note: Pick from New York Yankees as compensation for signing of free agent Paul Quantrill) | 2B | Sikeston High School (MO) |
| 29 | Matthew Campbell | Kansas City Royals (Note: Pick from San Francisco Giants as compensation for signing of free agent Michael Tucker) | LHP | South Carolina |
| 30 | Eric Hurley | Texas Rangers (Note: Pick from Atlanta Braves as compensation for signing of free agent John Thomson) | RHP | Wolfson High School (FL) |

== Supplemental first round selections ==
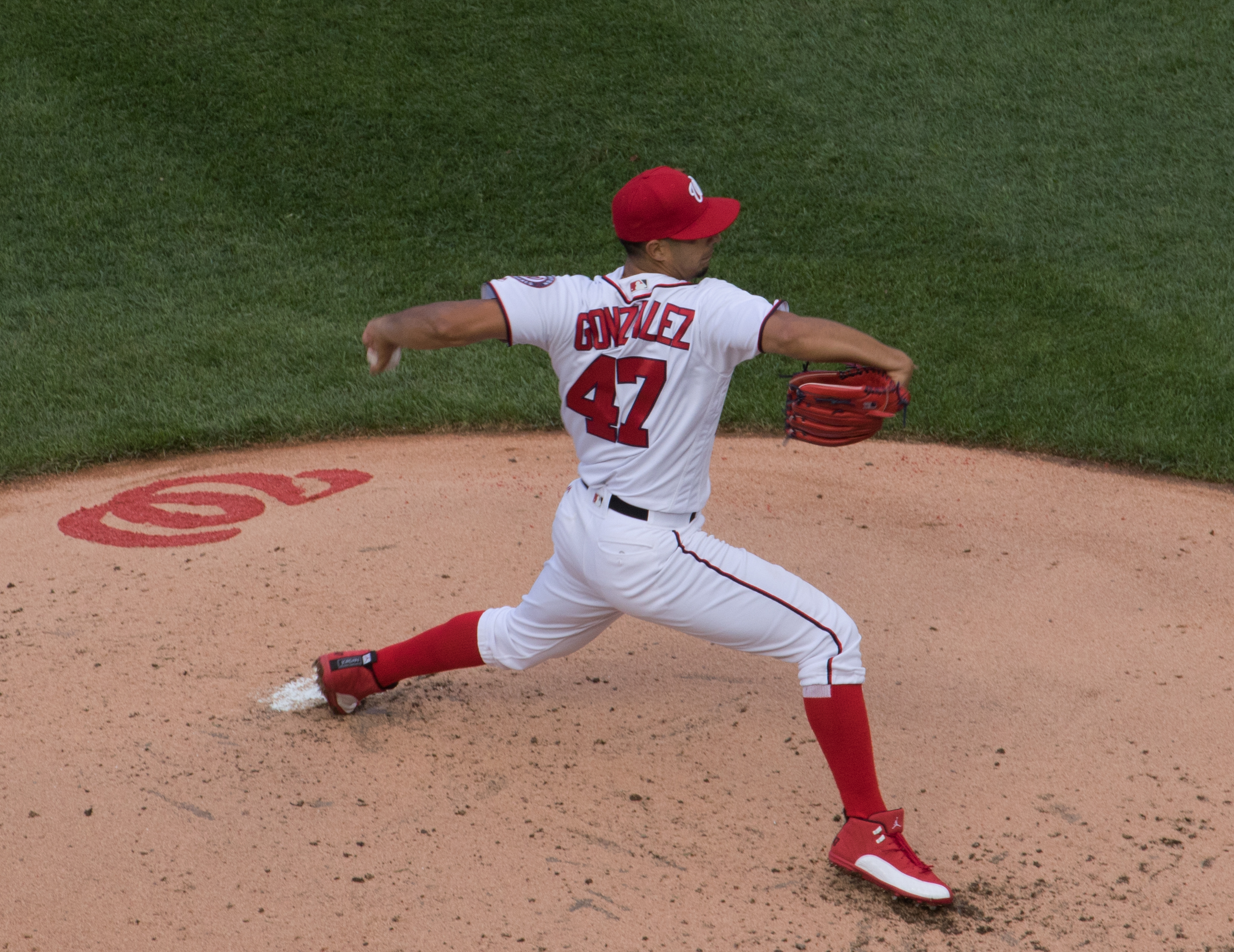
The White Sox selected Gio González 38th overall. He is a two-time All-Star and led the NL in wins in 2012.

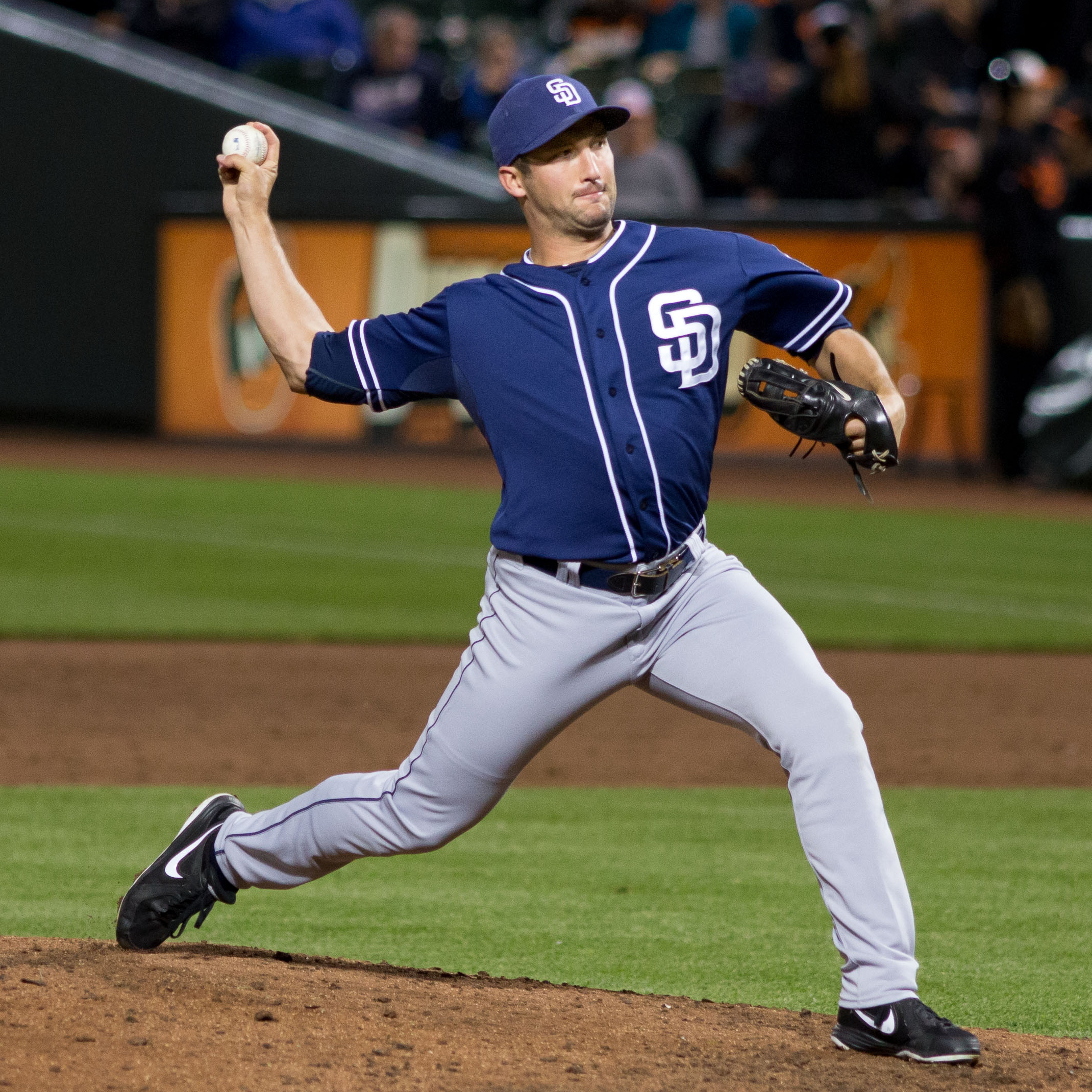
The Oakland Athletics selected Huston Street 40th overall. The 2× All-Star was named the 2005 AL Rookie of the Year.

| Pick | Player | Team | Position | School |
|---|---|---|---|---|
| 31 | J. P. Howell | Kansas City Royals (Note: Supplemental pick as compensation for loss of free agent Raul Ibanez) | LHP | Texas |
| 32 | Zach Jackson | Toronto Blue Jays (Note: Supplemental pick as compensation for loss of free agent Kelvim Escobar) | LHP | Texas A&M |
| 33 | Justin Orenduff | Los Angeles Dodgers (Note: Supplemental pick as compensation for loss of free agent Paul Quantrill) | RHP | VCU |
| 34 | Tyler Lumsden | Chicago White Sox (Note: Supplemental pick as compensation for loss of free agent Bartolo Colón) | LHP | Clemson |
| 35 | Matt Fox | Minnesota Twins (Note: Supplemental pick as compensation for loss of free agent Eddie Guardado) | RHP | UCF |
| 36 | Danny Putnam | Oakland Athletics (Note: Supplemental pick as compensation for loss of free agent Keith Foulke) | OF | Stanford |
| 37 | Jon Poterson | New York Yankees (Note: Supplemental pick as compensation for loss of free agent Andy Pettitte) | C | Chandler High School (AZ) |
| 38 | Gio González | Chicago White Sox (Note: Supplemental pick as compensation for loss of free agent Tom Gordon) | LHP | Monsignor Edward Pace High School (FL) |
| 39 | Jay Rainville | Minnesota Twins (Note: Supplemental pick as compensation for loss of free agent LaTroy Hawkins) | RHP | Bishop Hendricken High School (RI) |
| 40 | Huston Street | Oakland Athletics (Note: Supplemental pick as compensation for loss of free agent Miguel Tejada) | RHP | Texas |
| 41 | Jeff Marquez | New York Yankees (Note: Supplemental pick as compensation for loss of free agent David Wells) | RHP | Sacramento City College |

== Other notable selections ==
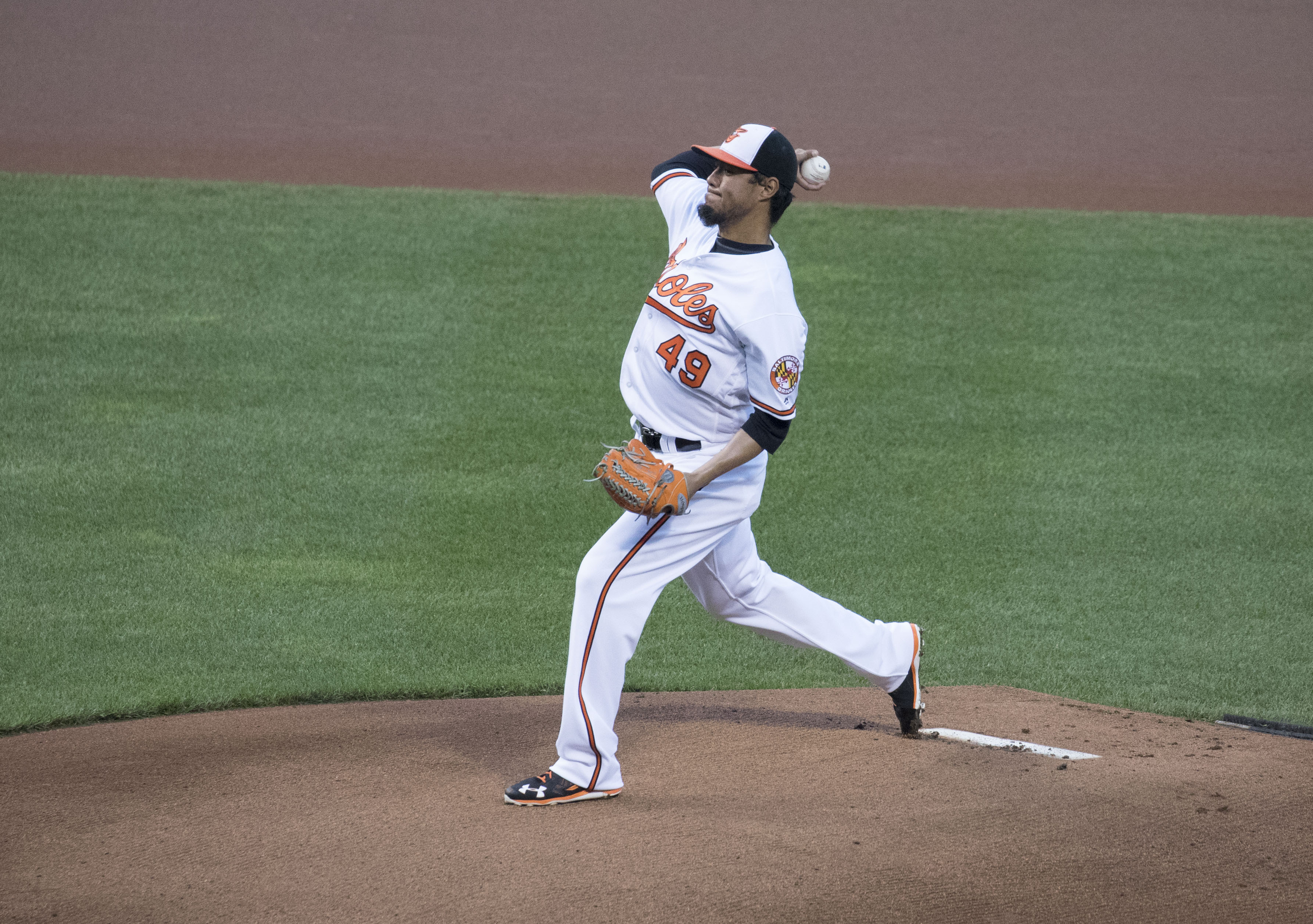
The Brewers selected Yovani Gallardo in the second round. Gallardo was an All-Star and Silver Slugger at pitcher in 2010

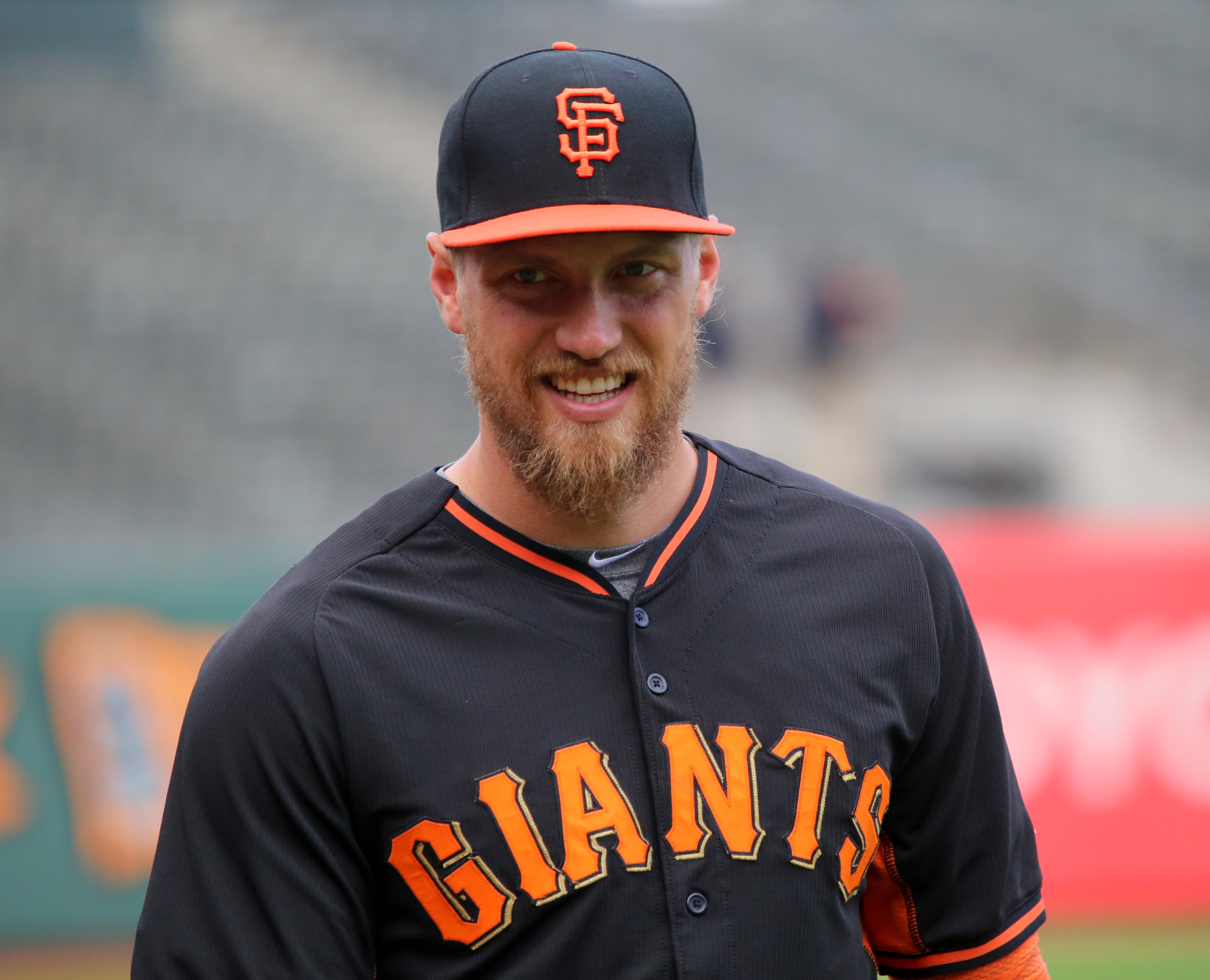
The Astros selected Hunter Pence in 64 overall. Pence is a 4× All-Star and won the World Series with the San Francisco Giants in 2012 and 2014.

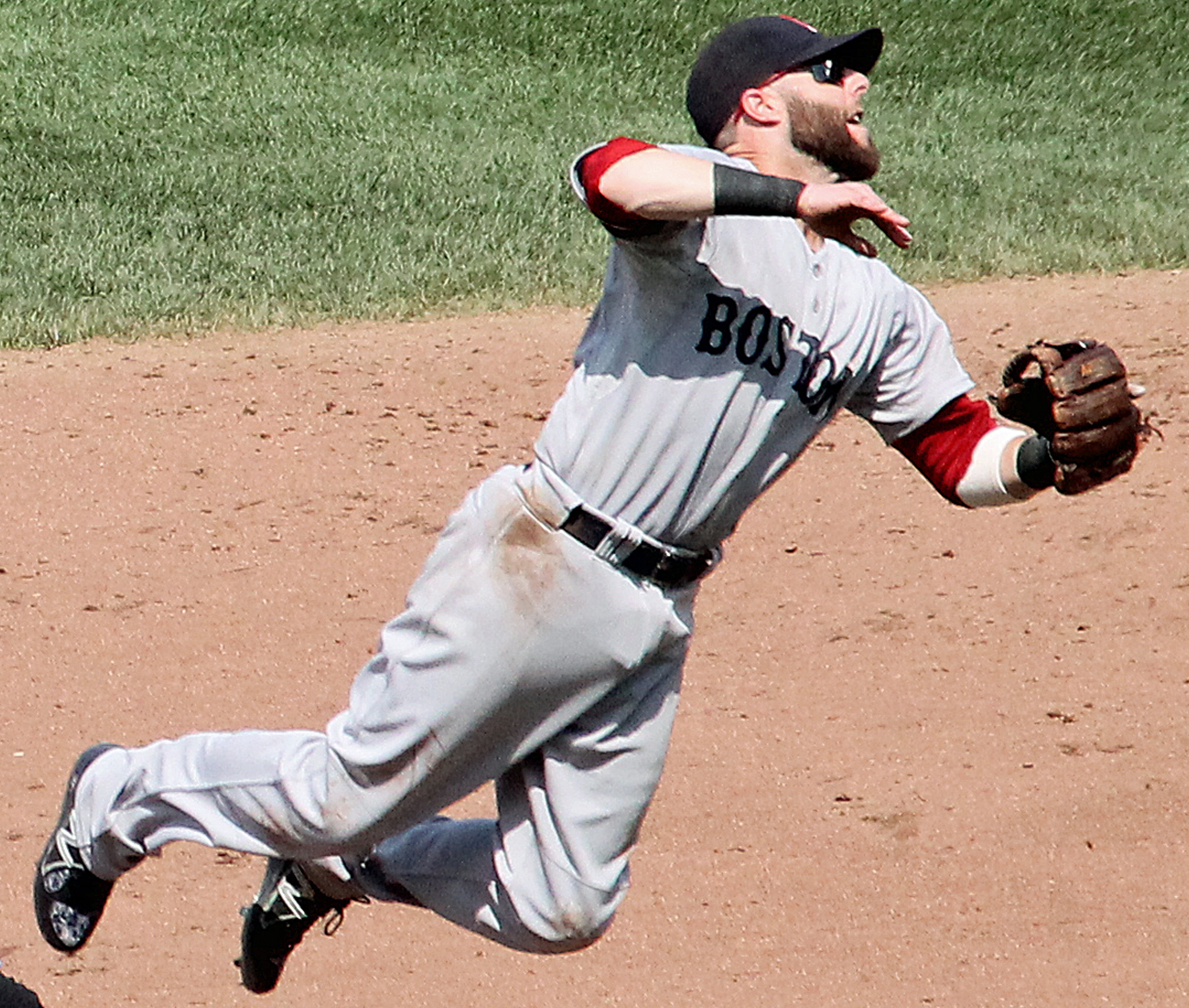
Boston selected Dustin Pedroia in the second round. The 4× All-Star won the 2007 AL Rookie of the Year Award and 2008 AL MVP.

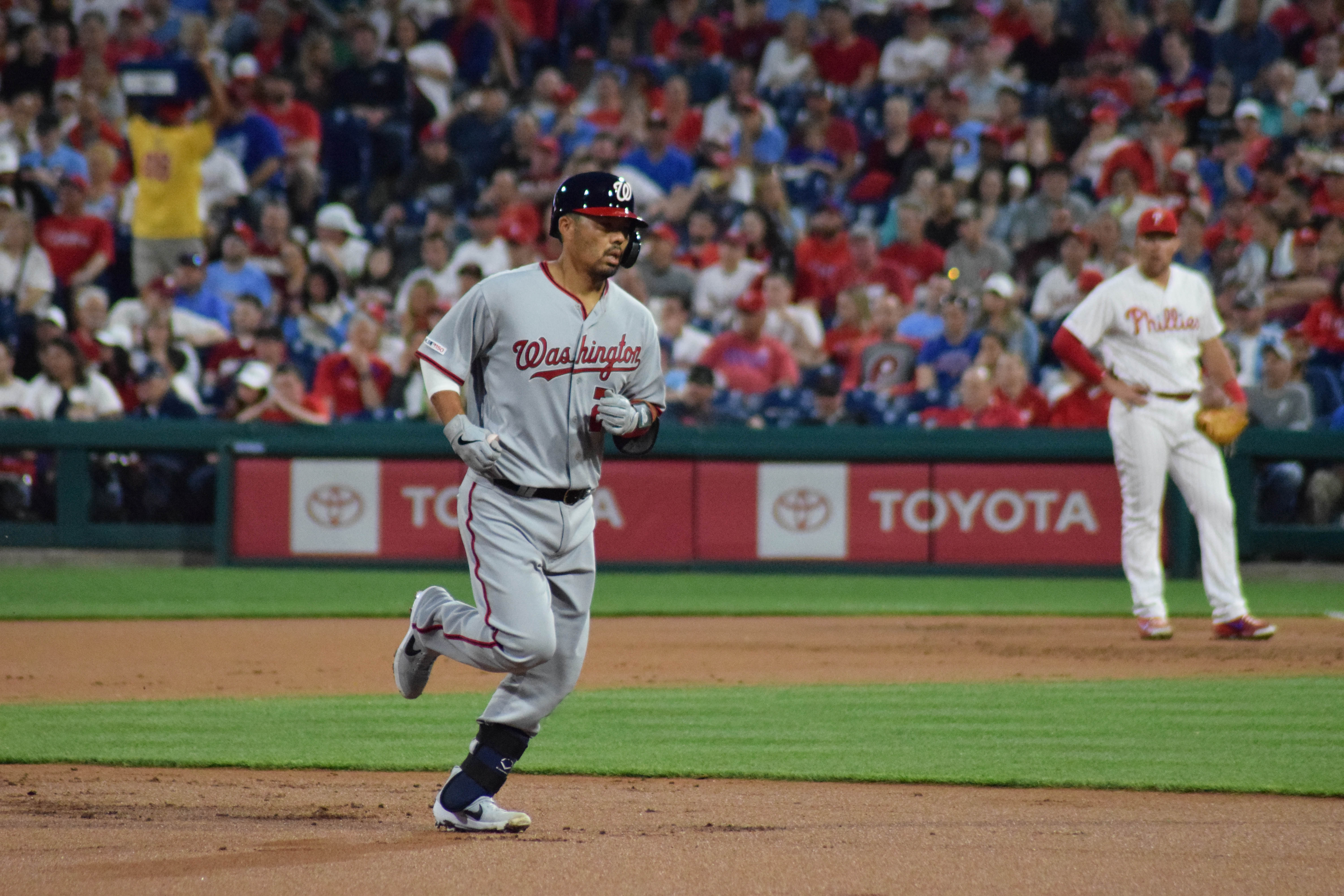
The Oakland Athletics selected Kurt Suzuki 67th overall. Suzuki was named a 2014 All-Star.

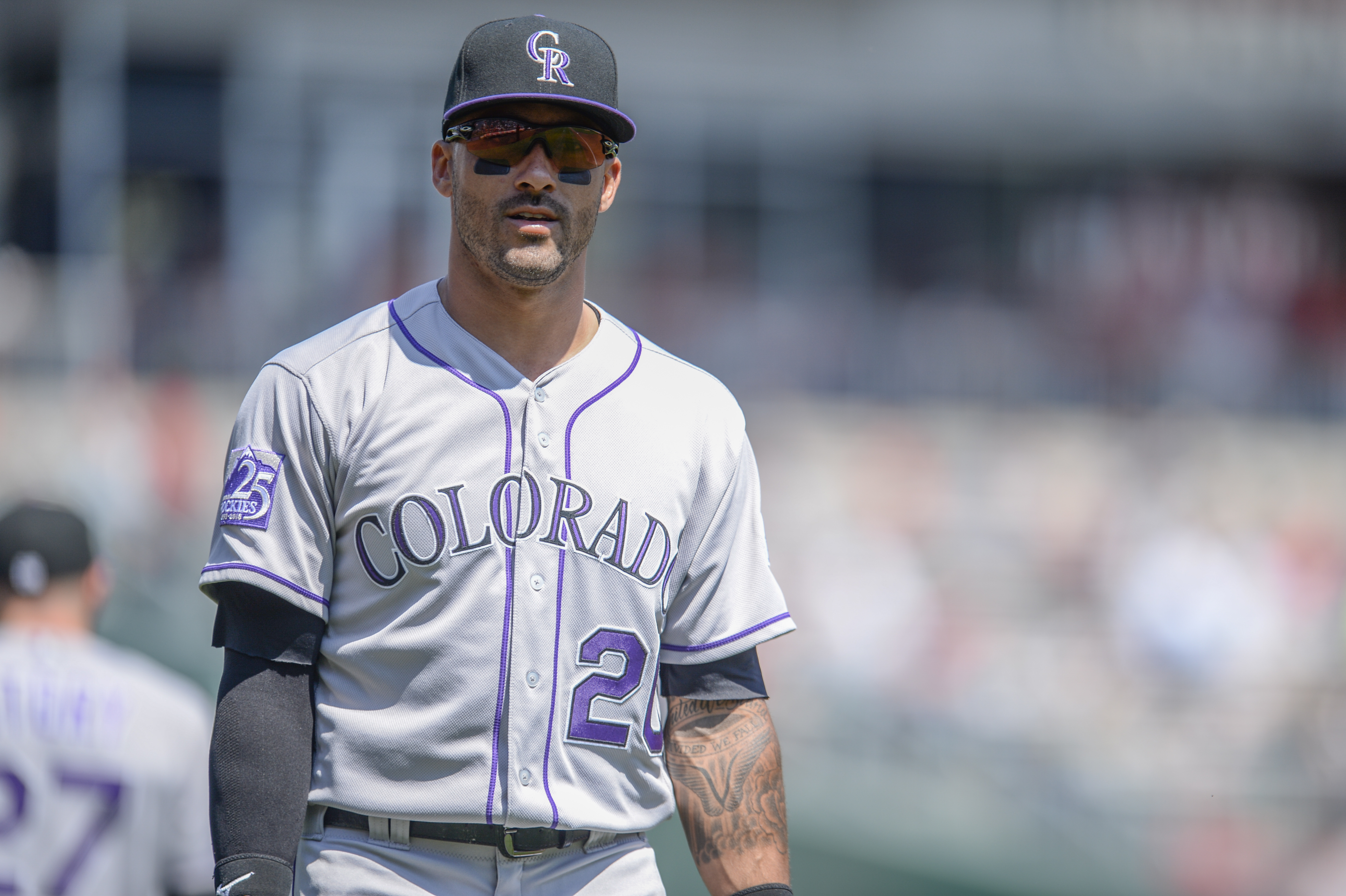
The Montreal Expos selected Ian Desmond in the 3rd round. He is a 2× All-Star and 3× Silver Slugger at shortstop.

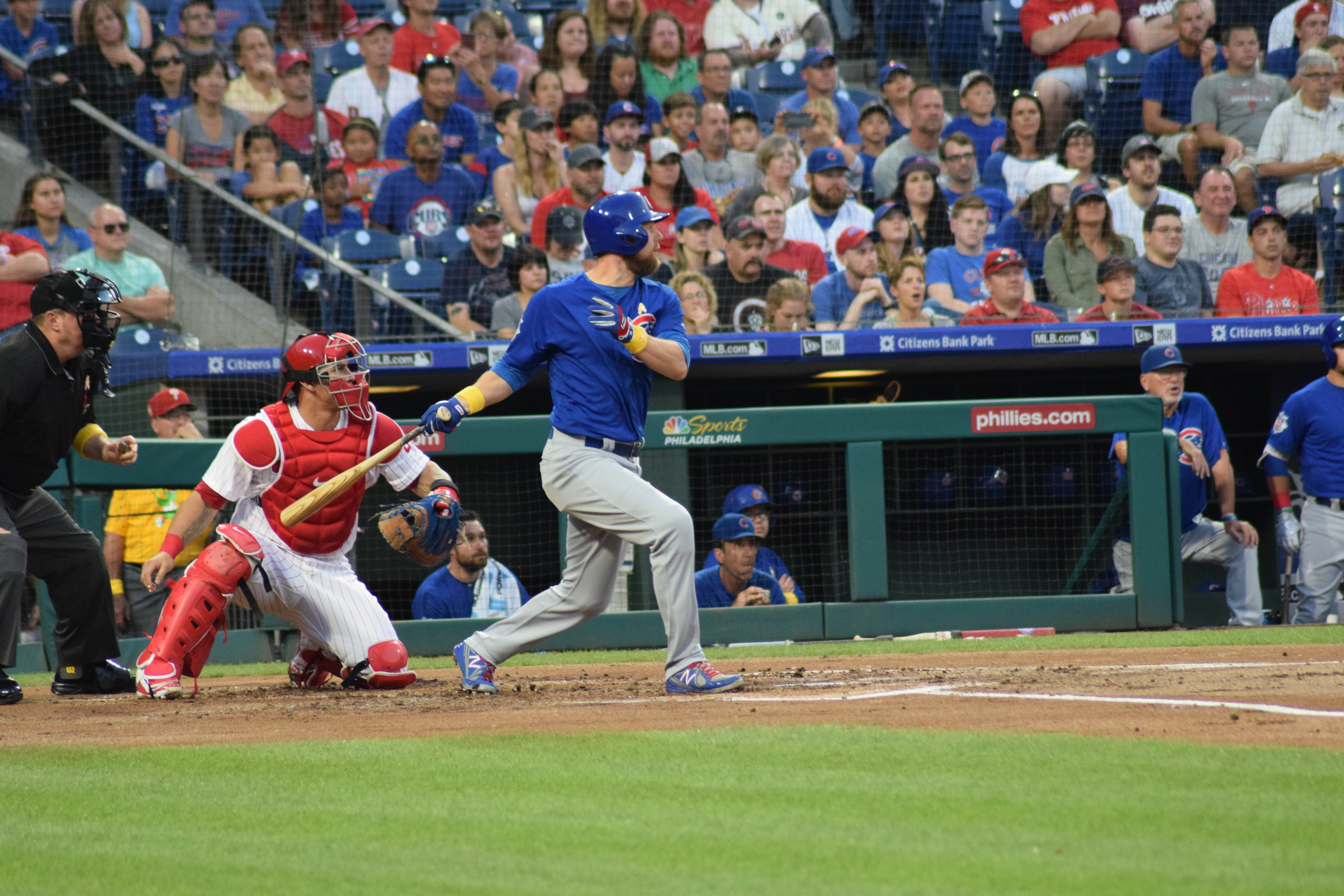
The Astros selected Ben Zobrist in the 6th round. He is a 3× All-Star, 2× World Series champion and the 2016 World Series MVP.

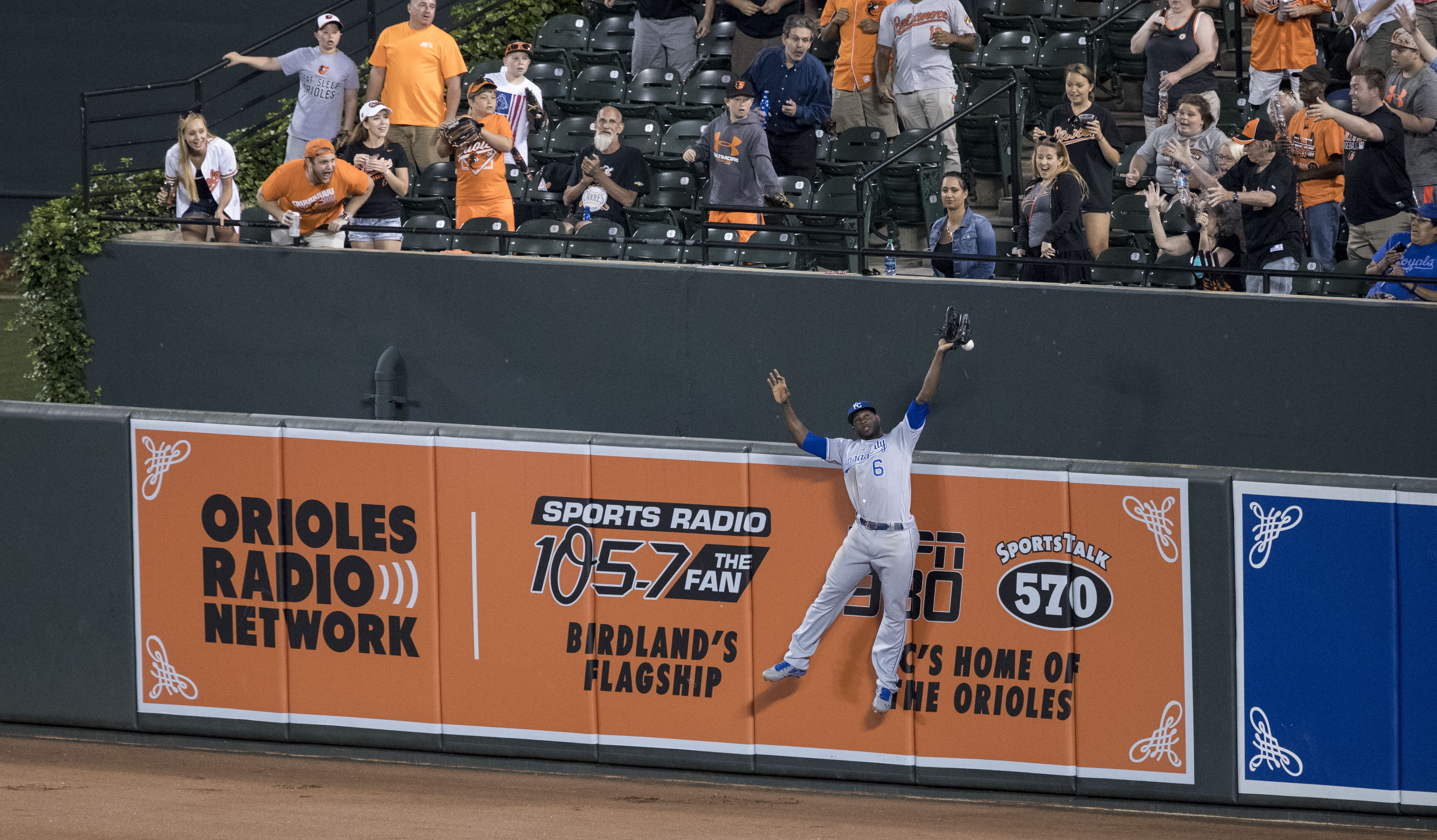
The Brewers selected Lorenzo Cain in the 17th round. The 2× All-Star won a Gold Glove at outfield in 2019.

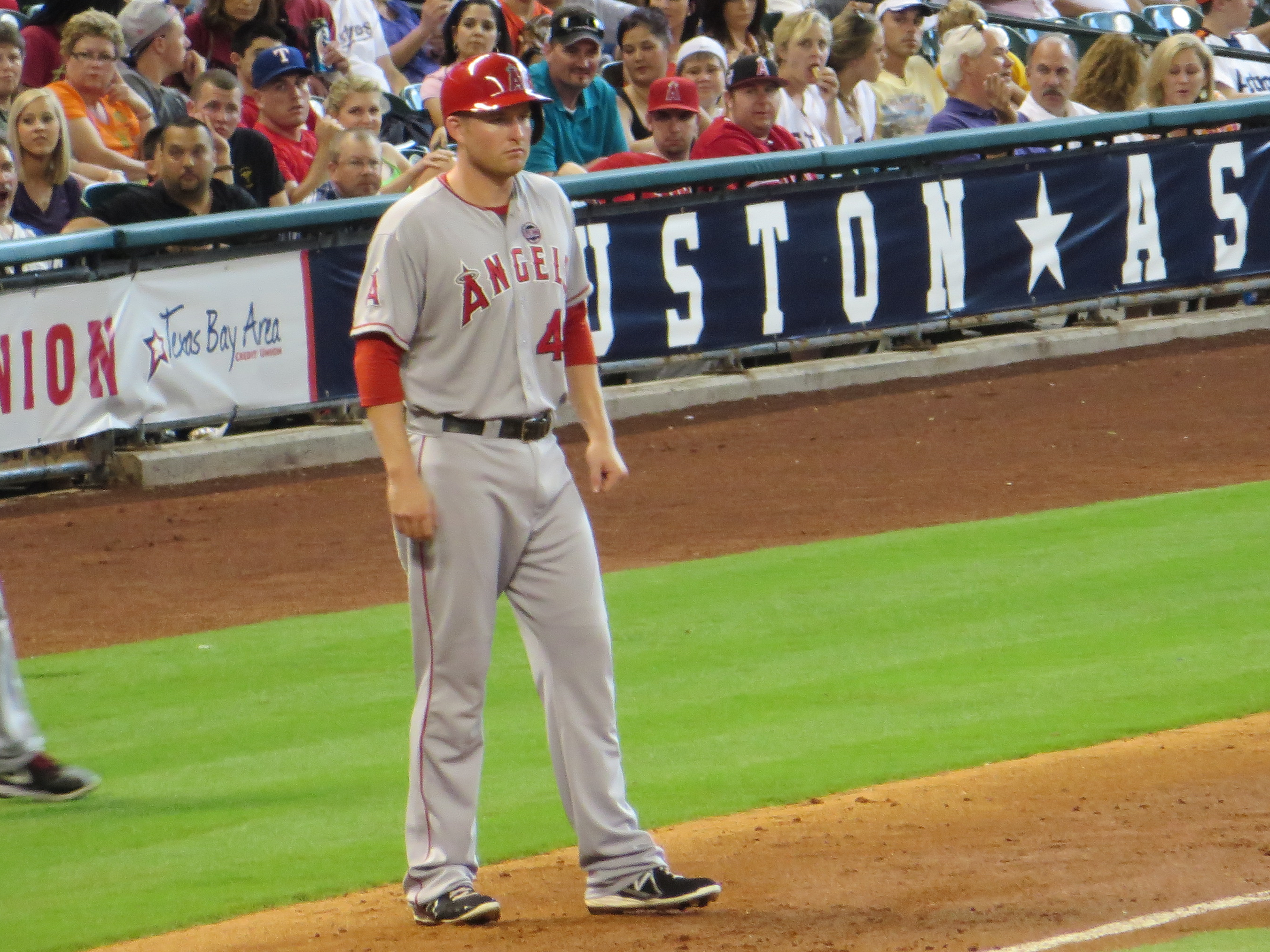
The Angels selected Mark Trumbo in the 18th Round. The 2× All-Star won the 2016 Silver Slugger for an outfielder when leading all of MLB in home runs.

| Round | Pick | Player | Team | Position | School |
|---|---|---|---|---|---|
| 2 | 46 | Yovani Gallardo | Milwaukee Brewers | Pitcher | Trimble Technical High School (TX) |
| 2 | 50 | Seth Smith | Colorado Rockies | Outfielder | Ole Miss |
| 2 | 61 | Anthony Swarzak | Minnesota Twins | Pitcher | Nova High School (FL) |
| 2 | 64 | Hunter Pence | Houston Astros | Outfielder | UT-Arlington |
| 2 | 65 | Dustin Pedroia | Boston Red Sox | Shortstop | Arizona State |
| 2 | 67 | Kurt Suzuki | Oakland Athletics | Catcher | Cal State Fullerton |
| 2 | 68 | Jason Vargas | Florida Marlins | Pitcher | Long Beach State |

- Wade Davis, 3rd round, 75th overall by the Tampa Bay Devil Rays
- Adam Lind, 3rd round, 83rd overall by the Toronto Blue Jays
- Ian Desmond, 3rd round, 84th overall by the Montreal Expos
- J. A. Happ, 3rd round, 92nd overall by the Philadelphia Phillies
- Chris Iannetta, 4th round, 110th overall by the Colorado Rockies
- Ross Ohlendorf, 4th round, 116th overall by the Arizona Diamondbacks
- Casey Janssen, 4th round, 117th overall by the Toronto Blue Jays
- Javy Guerra, 4th round, 118th overall by the Los Angeles Dodgers
- Lucas Harrell, 4th round, 119th overall by the Chicago White Sox
- Ryan Webb, 4th round, 127th overall by the Oakland Athletics
- James Parr, 4th round, 131st overall by the Atlanta Braves
- Jake McGee, 5th round, 135th overall by the Tampa Bay Devil Rays
- Mark Lowe, 5th round, 153rd overall by the Seattle Mariners
- Ben Zobrist, 6th round, 184th overall by the Houston Astros
- Troy Patton, 9th round, 274th overall by the Houston Astros
- Justin Maxwell, 10th round, 291st overall by the Texas Rangers
- Cory Wade, 10th round, 298th overall by the Los Angeles Dodgers
- Steve Pearce, 10th round, 305th overall by the Boston Red Sox, but did not sign
- Sam Fuld, 10th round, 306th overall by the Chicago Cubs
- Michael Saunders, 11th round, 333rd overall by the Seattle Mariners
- Andy Sonnanstine, 13th round, 375th overall by the Tampa Bay Devil Rays
- Dexter Fowler, 14th round, 410th overall by the Colorado Rockies
- Nick Adenhart, 14th round, 413th overall by the Anaheim Angels
- Will Venable, 15th round, 439th overall by the Baltimore Orioles, but did not sign
- Mark Reynolds, 16th round, 476th overall by the Arizona Diamondbacks
- Lorenzo Cain, 17th round, 496th overall by the Milwaukee Brewers
- J. P. Arencibia, 17th round, 513th overall by the Seattle Mariners, but did not sign
- Jerry Blevins, 17th round, 516th overall by the Chicago Cubs
- Cory Luebke, 18th round, 532nd overall by the Pittsburgh Pirates, but did not sign
- Mark Trumbo, 18th round, 533rd overall by the Anaheim Angels
- David Price, 19th round, 568th overall by the Los Angeles Dodgers, but did not sign
- Micah Owings, 19th round, 576th overall by the Chicago Cubs, but did not sign
- Jesse Litsch, 24th round, 717th overall by the Toronto Blue Jays
- Dallas Braden, 24th round, 727th overall by the Oakland Athletics
- Justin Ruggiano, 25th round, 748th overall by the Los Angeles Dodgers
- Jonathan Sánchez, 27th round, 820th overall by the San Francisco Giants
- Tyler Flowers, 27th round, 821st overall by the Atlanta Braves, but did not sign
- Brad Lincoln, 28th round, 826th overall by the Texas Rangers, but did not sign
- Charlie Blackmon, 28th round, 848th overall by the Florida Marlins, but did not sign
- Jaime García, 30th round, 889th overall by the Baltimore Orioles, but did not sign
- Jake Arrieta, 31st round, 918th overall by the Cincinnati Reds, but did not sign
- Jeff Gray, 32nd round, 967th overall by the Oakland Athletics
- Mike Dunn, 33rd round, 999th overall by the New York Yankees
- David Hernandez, 34th round, 1016th overall by the Arizona Diamondbacks, but did not sign
- Todd Frazier, 37th round, 1100th overall by the Colorado Rockies, but did not sign
- James Russell, 37th round, 1097th overall by the Seattle Mariners, but did not sign
- Kyle Blanks, 42nd round, 1241st overall by the San Diego Padres
- Tony Sipp, 45th round, 1333rd overall by the Cleveland Indians
- Chris Davis, 50th round, 1496th overall by the New York Yankees, but did not sign

=== NFL players drafted ===
- Pat White, 4th round, 113th overall by the Anaheim Angels, but did not sign
- Matt Moore, 22nd round, 653rd overall by the Anaheim Angels, but did not sign
- Matt Cassel, 36th round, 1087th overall by the Oakland Athletics, but did not sign
- Brian Brohm, 49th round, 1451st overall by the Colorado Rockies, but did not sign

== Background ==
The San Diego Padres stayed close to home with the first overall pick of the 2004 First-Year Player Draft, tabbing high school shortstop Matt Bush from Mission Bay (CA) High School. Bush, the first high school shortstop taken first overall since the Seattle Mariners chose Alex Rodriguez in 1993, batted .450 with 11 home runs, 35 RBI and 12 stolen bases during his senior year. The 18-year-old helped lead the Buccaneers to two San Diego Section Division III championships in three years, setting state records for career hits (211) and runs scored (188) in the process.

Huston Street, drafted in the supplemental first round, was the first 2004 draftee to make the major leagues. Justin Verlander was the first 2004 draftee to be selected to an All-Star Game in 2007. Dustin Pedroia, drafted in the second round, was the first 2004 draftee to be selected to start an All-Star Game and the first to win a World Series championship and the first to win a League MVP Award.

Three members of the 2003 NCAA Champions Rice Owls pitching staff were selected within the first eight picks. The Baltimore Orioles could not reach an agreement with Wade Townsend leading to Tampa Bay drafting him in 2005.

Nick Adenhart, who was selected in the 14th round by the Anaheim Angels, was killed in a car accident a day after his only start of the 2009 season.

During the 2012 season, first round picks Philip Humber, Homer Bailey, and Jered Weaver threw no hitters (Humber's was a perfect game).

| Preceded by Delmon Young | 1st Overall Picks; Matt Bush | Succeeded by Justin Upton |
