= Miner, Missouri =

City in Scott and Missouri counties in Missouri, United States

- City
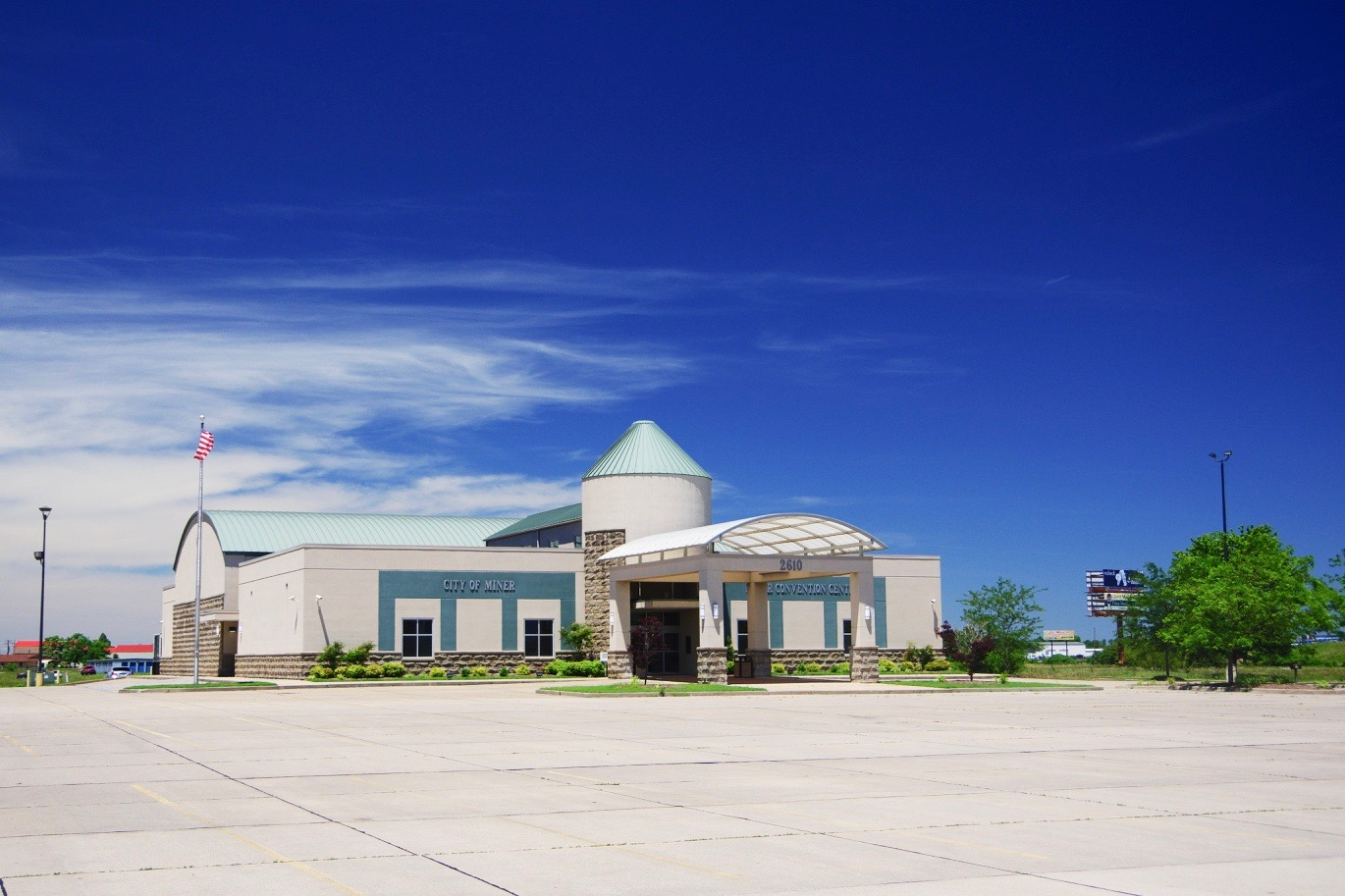
- Miner Convention Center

- Location in Scott County and the state of Missouri
- Coordinates: 36°53′31″N 89°32′08″W
- Country: United States
- State: Missouri
- Counties: Scott,

Area
  - Total: 4.61 sq mi (11.94 km^{2})
  - Land: 4.61 sq mi (11.94 km^{2})
  - Water: 0 sq mi (0.00 km^{2})
- Elevation: 312 ft (95 m)

Population (2020)
  - Total: 916
  - Density: 198.7/sq mi (76.73/km^{2})
- Time zone: UTC-6 (Central (CST))
  - Summer (DST): UTC-5 (CDT)
- ZIP code: 63801
- Area code: 573
- FIPS code: 29-48656
- GNIS feature ID: 2395343
- Website: www.cityofminer.com

Miner is a city in Scott and Mississippi counties in Missouri, United States. It is bordered to the west by the city of Sikeston. The population was 916 at the 2020 census.

== History ==
Miner was established in the 1860s as a stop along the Missouri Pacific Railroad. It was originally known as "Vannoy", but the name had been changed to "Minner Switch" by the time a post office was established in 1895. The community has the name of one Mr. Miner (or Minner), the proprietor of a local sawmill.

== Geography ==
The city is in the southeast corner of Scott County, concentrated around the intersection of Interstate 55 and U.S. Route 62 (Exit 67). The city's municipal boundaries extend northward adjacent to I-55 to Exit 69, and southward nearly to its interchange with Interstate 57 (this point marks the southern terminus of I-57). Sikeston borders Miner to the west.

According to the U.S. Census Bureau, Miner has a total area of 4.61 square miles (11.94 km^{2}), all land.

== Demographics ==
Historical population
Census	Pop.	Note	%±
1960	548		—
1970	640		16.8%
1980	1,182		84.7%
1990	1,218		3.0%
2000	1,056		−13.3%
2010	984		−6.8%
2020	916		−6.9%
U.S. Decennial Census

=== 2010 census ===
As of the census of 2010, there were 984 people, 389 households, and 259 families living in the city. The population density was 215.8 inhabitants per square mile (83.3/km^{2}). There were 429 housing units at an average density of 94.1 per square mile (36.3/km^{2}). The racial makeup of the city was 92.28% White, 3.15% Black or African American, 0.20% Native American, 0.61% Asian, 1.73% from other races, and 2.03% from two or more races. Hispanic or Latino of any race were 4.37% of the population.

There were 389 households, of which 32.4% had children under the age of 18 living with them, 51.4% were married couples living together, 10.8% had a female householder with no husband present, 4.4% had a male householder with no wife present, and 33.4% were non-families. 29.6% of all households were made up of individuals, and 13.4% had someone living alone who was 65 years of age or older. The average household size was 2.42 and the average family size was 2.99.

The median age in the city was 41.9 years. 23.7% of residents were under the age of 18; 5.9% were between the ages of 18 and 24; 23.6% were from 25 to 44; 28.8% were from 45 to 64; and 18% were 65 years of age or older. The gender makeup of the city was 46.6% male and 53.4% female.

=== 2000 census ===
As of the census of 2000, there were 1,056 people, 408 households, and 290 families living in the city. The population density was 257.5 inhabitants per square mile (99.4/km^{2}). There were 442 housing units at an average density of 107.8 per square mile (41.6/km^{2}). The racial makeup of the city was 92.90% White, 2.18% African American, 0.57% Native American, 0.95% Asian, 0.28% Pacific Islander, 1.14% from other races, and 1.99% from two or more races. Hispanic or Latino of any race were 2.27% of the population.

There were 408 households, out of which 31.9% had children under the age of 18 living with them, 57.4% were married couples living together, 9.6% had a female householder with no husband present, and 28.7% were non-families. 25.2% of all households were made up of individuals, and 12.3% had someone living alone who was 65 years of age or older. The average household size was 2.48 and the average family size was 2.92.

In the city the population was spread out, with 24.0% under the age of 18, 8.0% from 18 to 24, 26.7% from 25 to 44, 26.0% from 45 to 64, and 15.2% who were 65 years of age or older. The median age was 38 years. For every 100 females there were 92.0 males. For every 100 females age 18 and over, there were 89.4 males.

The median income for a household in the city was $30,750, and the median income for a family was $35,132. Males had a median income of $28,611 versus $18,487 for females. The per capita income for the city was $17,409. About 16.3% of families and 18.6% of the population were below the poverty line, including 21.7% of those under age 18 and 29.2% of those age 65 or over.

== Education ==
Almost all of it is in the Sikeston School District. A small piece extends into the Scott County R-IV School District. The portion in Mississippi County is in the Charleston R-I School District.

The Sikeston district operates Sikeston High School.

Three Rivers College's service area includes Scott County and Mississippi County.

== See also ==
- List of cities in Missouri
