= Marcin Jagoda =

American beach volleyball player (born 1980)

Personal information
- Nationality: American
- Born: December 28, 1980 (age 45); Tarzana, California, U.S.
- Hometown: Calabasas, California, U.S.
- Height: 6 ft 3 in (191 cm)
- Weight: 220 lb (100 kg)

Beach volleyball information

Current teammate
Years	Teammate
2009	Seth Burnham

Marcin Jagoda (born December 28, 1980) is a male beach volleyball player from the United States.

With partner Seth Burnham, Jagoda competed at the NORCECA Beach Volleyball Circuit 2009 at Manzanillo, placing 9th, and Puerto Vallarta, placing 6th. He made several more NORCECA tour appearances with Stafford Slick have a best finish 3rd in Chiapas.

Jagoda represented Poland in the 2016 FIVB Beach Volleyball World Tour with Szymon Tralka, competing at the Puerto Vallarta Open and the Cincinnati Open.

== Early life ==
Marcin Jagoda attended Crespi Carmelite High School in Encino, Los Angeles. He played for the Los Angeles Athletic Club boys' volleyball team, competing at Junior Nationals in 1999. His senior year was nominated to the final selection list of the 1999 McDonalds All America basketball game.

Jagoda played volleyball at UCLA having lettered his junior and senior years, graduating in 2004 with a degree in sociology. Post college, Jagoda played on year of professional basketball in Poland and Ireland. He later went back to playing indoor professional volleyball in Greece, Cyprus, and France. He qualified for the AVP tour in 2009 and followed up with a few main draw appearances on the AVP, Cuervo, NVL Tours.
