= Harry Welch (American football) =

American football coach (born 1945)

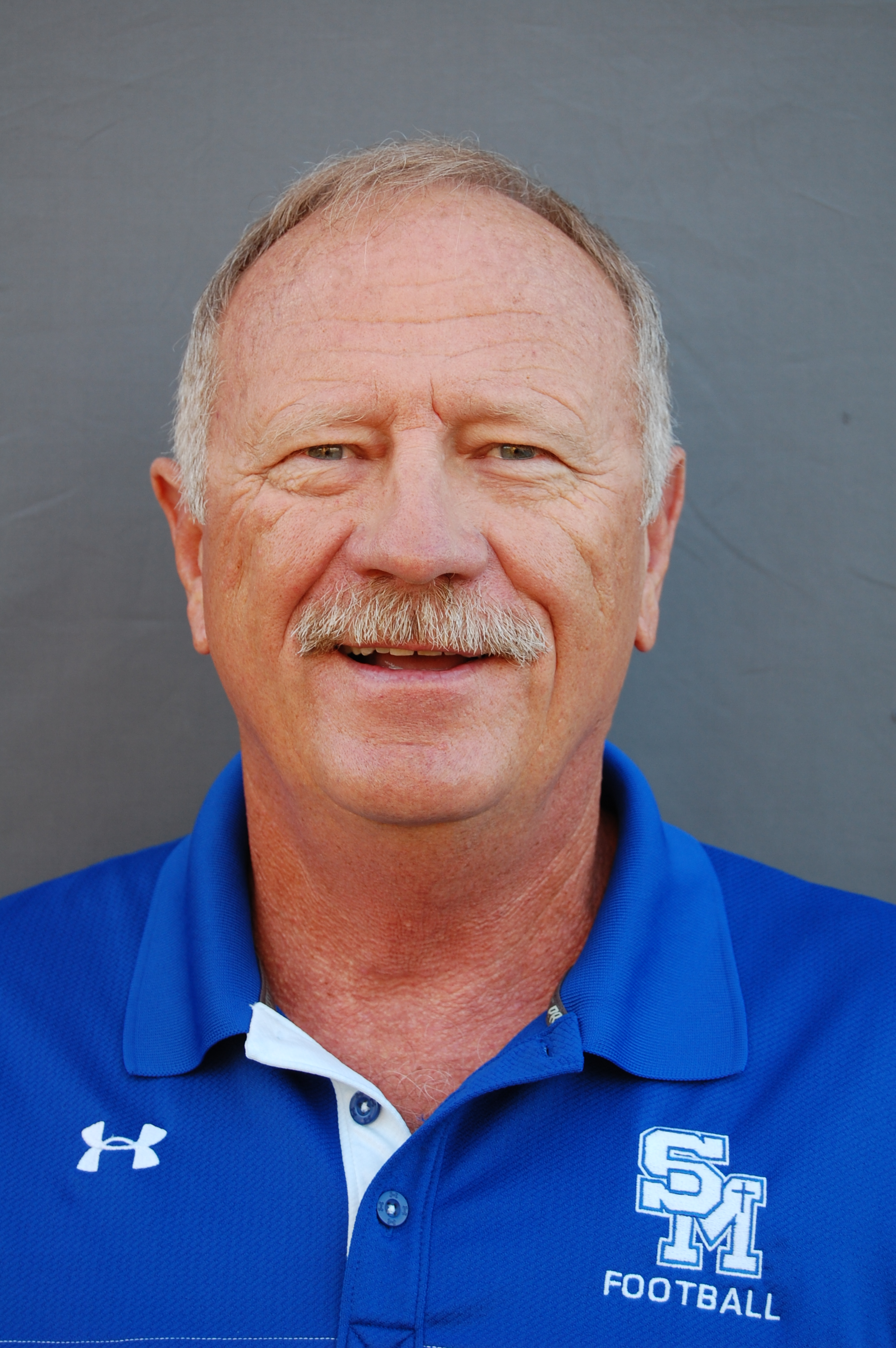

Biographical details
- Born: April 4, 1945; Baltimore, Maryland, U.S.
- Education: San Fernando Valley State College

Coaching career (HC unless noted)
- 1965–1970: Crespi HS (CA) (assistant)
- 1971–1973: Canyon HS (CA) (assistant)
- 1974–1978: L.A. Valley College (assistant)
- 1982–1993: Canyon HS (CA)
- 2001–2006: Canyon HS (CA)
- 2007–2009: St. Margaret's Episcopal School (CA)
- 2010–2013: Santa Margarita Catholic HS (CA)

Head coaching record
- Overall: 258–62–1

Accomplishments and honors

Championships
- 3 CIF State (2006, 2008, 2011); 9 CIF Southern Section (1983, 1984, 1985, 2005, 2006, 2007, 2008, 2009, 2011)

Harry Edward Welch Jr. (born April 4, 1945) is an American retired high school football coach who is one of the most successful in California prep football history. In a 43-year coaching career, 25 of which were as a head coach, Welch averaged over 10 wins per season. He finished with a career coaching record of 258 wins, 62 losses and 1 tie—an 80.5% winning percentage. Welch is the only California high school football coach to lead three different schools to state championship wins on the field. In that realm he was a perfect 3–0. In late 2009, Welch was recognized by the Los Angeles Daily News as the high school "Football Coach of the Decade," covering the 2000–09 seasons. In the ten-year span, nine of which he coached, Welch's overall record was 104-15 (.874). He boasted double-digit wins the last eight years of the decade that included two state championships and two undefeated campaigns. In 2022, Welch's fruitful career was acknowledged and honored with being chosen to two Halls of Fame—the California Interscholastic Federation – Southern Section (CIF-SS) Hall of Fame and in the inaugural class of the California High School Football Hall of Fame. Although widely known for his football success, Welch's career accomplishments carried beyond athletics. His leadership on the football field was equally paired with his dedication as an academic educator. Welch was a gifted teacher who spent as many years in the classroom as he did on the field.

== Early years ==
Welch was born in Baltimore, Maryland, on April 4, 1945, to Harry Edward Welch Sr. and Marie Agnes Welch (nee Snow), joining older sisters June and Diane. In 1954, at age 9, the Welch family moved to Tarzana, California, where his father was employed in the theater business.

=== High school ===
For high school, Welch enrolled at the newly opened Crespi High School in Encino. There he played on the football team, being utilized at nearly every position on both sides of the ball, including quarterback. In addition, Welch was very active in student government. During the 1961 season, he solidified a place in the early history of the school's football program. On November 24, Welch threw the first touchdown pass in school playoff history—a 10-yard strike to Pat Breaux in a 14–7 loss at Bishop Union High School. On October 6, 1962, Crespi hosted St. Bernard's (Playa Del Rey) in what was their first-ever Camino Real League game. During the first quarter, Celts' starting quarterback Tom Mooney left with an ankle injury. Welch, the team's backup, came on to lead his club to a 19–6 victory and maintain an undefeated slate of 3–0 to start the season. That game, Welch completed 8-of-12 passes (66.7%) for 75 yards and engineered all three of his school's touchdown scoring drives.

=== College ===
Upon graduating high school in 1963, Welch headed north to the Bay Area and attended Santa Clara University for one year before returning to the Los Angeles area. He continued his studies at nearby San Fernando Valley State College (now known as California State University, Northridge) and received his bachelor's degree in history and English in 1967. Shortly thereafter, he earned his master's degree and teaching credential.

== Coaching career ==
=== High school and junior college ===
Welch embarked on a coaching career as an assistant at his alma mater, Crespi High School, in 1965 while still completing his college degree. One of his most notable players for the Celts was Randy Cross, an offensive lineman who would go on to play at the University of California, Los Angeles and emerge as an All-Pro selection and three-time Super Bowl champion started his longtime association with Canyon High School in Santa Clarita, California, where he began as an English teacher and assistant football coach. Welch later moved on to be an assistant coach at Los Angeles Valley College from 1974 to 1978. With the Monarchs, he mentored future NFL professionals Odis McKinney, Vernon Dean and Jack Steptoe. The 1975 team won the Metro Conference title, were Potato Bowl champions and concluded the season ranked No. 2 in the national polls.

=== Canyon High School ===
In 1982, at age 37, Welch was named the head coach at Canyon High School and served in that capacity for twelve seasons from 1982 through 1993. It was the first of his two stints with the Cowboys. After just one season, Welch enjoyed success with three-consecutive CIF Southern Section (CIF-SS) championships while posting a 46-game winning streak along the way, over parts of three seasons (1983–85). He led Canyon to the 1983 Northwestern Conference title with a win over Bishop Montgomery (Torrance) 40–24 at College of the Canyons. The following season his team defeated Santa Maria 33–6 for a second-consecutive Northwestern Conference title, again at College of the Canyons. In 1985, the Cowboys completed the trifecta, their third championship in succession, with a hard-fought 9–7 victory versus Antelope Valley at Canyon. In 1988, Antelope Valley avenged that defeat to claim the Division II title 28–22 in what would be the only championship game setback of Welch's entire career. In 1993, after 12 successful seasons, he stepped away from the field but remained a teacher at the school.

One of Welch's anchors on the Cowboy defense from 1988 to 1990 was the late Chuck Osborne Jr. The talented defensive tackle was selected All-Golden Valley League and All-Santa Clarita Valley First-Team - Defense in 1991. Osborne played college football at the University of Arizona where he was a key member of the famed "Desert Swarm" defense.

On August 30, 1990, Canyon High School, coached by Welch, played an away game against Saint Louis High School in Honolulu, Hawaii. Prior to the game, Saint Louis had a 55-game winning streak dating back to late 1985. Canyon won the game 40–0, marking the only time Saint Louis has been shutout by an opponent from the continental United States. The 40-point margin remains the third-largest defeat Saint Louis has experienced against a mainland school, surpassed only by St. John Bosco in 2014 (49 points) and Bishop Gorman in 2022 (42 points).

In 2001 Welch returned once again as the head coach at Canyon and led the Cowboys to two-consecutive CIF-SS titles in 2005 and 2006. The 2005 Division II title game featured a rematch between Canyon and neighboring Foothill League rival Hart (Newhall). The two schools, separated by less than 10 miles, traveled all the way to the Home Depot Center in Carson to decide the outcome. The Cowboys, who had won 16-14 in Foothill League play, came away with the 21–13 win as they beat the Indians for the second time in the span of a month to finish the season with a 13-1 record.

Welch's 2006 team squeezed past Moorpark 24–22 in the Northern Division Championship game. It was the second win over the Musketeers that season. The Cowboys were then selected to represent the South in the first true high school championship game in California since the 1927 season. Canyon was pitted against the juggernaut program that dominated California prep football for two decades -- Concord De La Salle. On December 16, 2006, the undaunted Cowboys ended a 12-2 campaign by rolling past the Spartans 27–13 to claim the CIF State Division I Championship Bowl Game—the first of Welch's three state titles. Just weeks later, in early January 2007, Welch resigned from his position at Canyon. His record over 18 years as head coach (1982-1993, 2001-2006) was 181 wins, 47 losses, and 1 tie, and Canyon High's on-campus stadium was renamed Harry Welch Stadium in his honor.

While at Canyon, Welch became a distinguished English literature teacher. His class offerings were unique and thought provoking which led them to become student favorites. The most popular courses were his Bible as Literature and Shakespeare classes. For five years, Welch served as a mentor in the William S. Hart Union High School District and in 1991 was voted "Teacher of the Year" at Canyon.

=== St. Margaret's ===
In 2007, shortly after his departure from Canyon, Welch accepted the head coaching position at St. Margaret's Episcopal School. At the same time he relocated his residence to Orange County (California). Welch was at the helm of the Tartan's program for three remarkable seasons. He guided the program to a near flawless record of 42–1, which included winning his first 30 games, with three CIF-SS championships and one California State Bowl title over the three-season period of 2007–09.

The first season, 2007, St. Margaret's finished 14–0 and won the CIF-SS Northeast Division title by defeating [Brentwood School] (Los Angeles), 37–6 on a neutral field (Notre Dame High School in Sherman Oaks). The Tartans' high-octane offense scored a then-Orange County (California) single-season record 674 points.

The 2008 season saw St. Margaret's move up a division level. Undaunted, they finished undefeated once again (15–0) and claimed the CIF-SS East Valley Division crown, against [Twentynine Palms High School] at home, 17–3. The following week the Tartans won 59–7 as they dominated Hamilton Union High School (Chico) at the Home Depot Center (Carson) in the inaugural California State Small School Championship Bowl Game. A highlight of the season was the 742 points the team scored—another new Orange County record and fourth-best total in CIF-SS history. Welch notched his 200th career victory the middle of the season against Western Christian High School (Upland, California), 58–7.

Though the Tartans' county-record 44-game win streak came to an end in Week 2 of the 2009 season with a 28-20 loss to Francis Parker School of San Diego, St. Margaret's would not suffer defeat again the rest of the year. In December 2009, St. Margaret's traveled over 300 miles one-way, to play a postseason semifinal game at Bishop Union High School. The school, located in Inyo County, has an elevation of 4,150 feet. Weather conditions were inclement enough for the game to be considered the "coldest recorded football game" in CIF-SS history—an immediate chapter in playoff lore. After the 7:30 p.m. start, temperatures dropped to approximately 30 degrees, with winds blowing at 18 mph (40 mph gusts) and a wind chill factor of 19 degrees. The Tartans prevailed 47–6.

The following week, at Ontario Christian, the wind chill was a bit higher at 43 degrees but the elements were again challenging as the Tartans played on a muddy track and captured another title, 12–6, scoring a late touchdown to seal the triumph.

The win was St. Margaret's fourth-consecutive CIF-SS title (2006–09) which was also an Orange County record and placed the Tartans in "rare air" as one of only three programs in CIF-SS history to accomplish such a feat: Temple City from 1969–1972 and St. Bonaventure (Ventura), 1999–2002 were the other two. The school won a CIF-SS title the season before Welch arrived under the leadership of coach Jason Hitchens.

At the conclusion of the 2010 season, Welch resigned from his position at St. Margaret's and accepted the head coaching role at Santa Margarita Catholic High School. His final record with the Tartans was an unrivaled 42–1 (.976).

=== Santa Margarita ===
Welch was introduced as the third head football coach in Santa Margarita Catholic High School football history on January 21, 2010. After posting consecutive 3–7 seasons in both 2008 and 2009, Santa Margarita hired Welch to return the program to greatness in the ever-rugged Trinity League. The coaching change made significant impact as the Eagles made a big jump forward, finishing 9–3. Turning in the right direction, the six-game improvement was the best increase in wins in the school's history.

With many experienced players, Welch guided the 2011 team to a 13–2 record that included the CIF-SS Pac-5 Division title and a 42-37 victory over Bellarmine Prep of San Jose in the CIF State Division I Championship Bowl Game. The Eagles finished the season ranked as high as No. 10 in some national polls.

The 2012 season looked as if Santa Margarita would challenge for another state crown and even a national championship with Stanton returning at quarterback along with one of his most reliable receivers, River Cracraft. The pair went on to successful college careers and played in the NFL for several seasons. Santa Margarita started the season ranked highly in several polls—touted as No. 1 in the nation by Rivals.com and No. 2 by USA Today. The Eagles looked unstoppable at first as they jumped out to a 6–0 record before a season-ending injury to Stanton deflated the momentum. Santa Margarita fell from its perch with their first loss at the hands of rival Mater Dei of Santa Ana, California, 24–7. The team qualified for the postseason but could not recreate the magic of the prior year and finished with a respectable record of 9–3. A nonleague contest versus Trabuco Hills High School (Mission Viejo) game in the third week was Welch's 300th overall game coached. The lopsided 55–0 victory gave him 247 wins in his first 300 contests.

Prior to the commencement of the 2013 season, Welch announced that his fourth season at Santa Margarita would be his last. Following a disappointing 4–6 campaign, the only losing season of his career, Welch stepped down after completing his 25th season as a varsity head football coach at the high school level, 38th year of high school coaching and 43rd year in coaching overall (including five years at Los Angeles Valley College). Welch's final tally at Santa Margarita was 35 wins and 14 losses in his four seasons, a .714 win-loss percentage.

==== "Tough Knocks" ====
In the summer prior to the 2011 prep football season, the Orange County Register and its high school sports website ocvarsity.com produced an online reality-based series set around the Santa Margarita Catholic football program entitled "Tough Knocks." Each week, a new installment, roughly 3–5 minutes in length, was released. The 17-episode series documented the drama and success of Welch's high-profile program with behind-the-scenes access of the athletes as they navigated through the challenging season. Episode 5 was extra special as it featured the program taking part in Prostate Cancer Awareness Month. Coach Harry Welch recalled his own battle a year prior with prostate cancer.

== Head coaching record ==
=== High School ===
Year	Team	Regular Season					Postseason
Year	Team	Won	Lost	Ties	Win %	Finish	Result
1982	Canyon	8	4	0	.667	1st in Golden League	CIF-SS Northwestern Conference Quarterfinalists
1983	Canyon	13	1	0	.929	1st in Golden League	CIF-SS Northwestern Conference Champions
1984	Canyon	14	0	0	1.000	1st in Golden League	CIF-SS Northwestern Conference Champions
1985	Canyon	14	0	0	1.000	1st in Golden League	CIF-SS Northwestern Conference Champions
1986	Canyon	11	2	0	.846	2nd in Golden League	CIF-SS Coastal Conference Semifinalists
1987	Canyon	10	3	0	.769	1st in Golden League	CIF-SS Coastal Conference Semifinalists
1988	Canyon	11	3	0	.786	1st in Golden League	CIF-SS Division II Finalists
1989	Canyon	8	4	1	.654	1st in Golden League	CIF-SS Division II Semifinalists
1990	Canyon	11	2	0	.846	2nd in Golden League	CIF-SS Division I Semifinalists
1991	Canyon	6	6	0	.500	3rd in Golden League	CIF-SS Division I Quarterfinalists
1992	Canyon	7	4	0	.636	3rd in Foothill League	CIF-SS Division II First Round
1993	Canyon	6	4	0	.600	2nd in Foothill League	CIF-SS Division II First Round
Canyon Total (first stint)		119	33	1	.781		
2001	Canyon	6	4	0	.600	4th in Foothill League	Did Not Qualify
2002	Canyon	10	2	0	.833	3rd in Foothill League	CIF-SS Division II Quarterfinalists
2003	Canyon	11	2	0	.846	2nd in Foothill League	CIF-SS Division II Semifinalists
2004	Canyon	10	2	0	.833	2nd in Foothill League	CIF-SS Division II Quarterfinalists
2005	Canyon	13	1	0	.929	1st in Foothill League	CIF-SS Division II Champions
2006	Canyon	12	2	0	.857	1st in Foothill League	CIF-SS Northern Division Champions, CIF State Division I Champions
Canyon Total (second stint)		62	14	0	.816		
2007	St. Margaret's	14	0	0	1.000	1st in Academy League	CIF-SS Northeast Division Champions
2008	St. Margaret's	15	0	0	1.000	1st in Academy League	CIF-SS East Valley Division Champions, CIF State Small Schools Champions
2009	St. Margaret's	13	1	0	.929	1st in Academy League	CIF-SS East Valley Division Champions
St. Margaret's Total		42	1	0	.977		
2010	Santa Margarita	9	3	0	.750	2nd in Trinity League	CIF-SS Pac-5 Division Quarterfinalists
2011	Santa Margarita	13	2	0	.867	T-2nd in Trinity League	CIF-SS Pac-5 Division Champions, CIF State Division I Champions
2012	Santa Margarita	9	3	0	.750	3rd in Trinity League	CIF-SS Pac-5 Division Quarterfinalists
2013	Santa Margarita	4	6	0	.400	6th in Trinity League	Did Not Qualify
Santa Margarita Total		35	14	0	.714		
Career Total		258	62	1	.805		

== Accomplishments ==
Welch ended his career with 258 victories, 62 losses and 1 tie. His .805 winning percentage is second-best in California prep history among coaches with 250 career wins.

That .805 winning percentage puts Welch in the company of just one dozen other coaches in California prep history to achieve the 80.0%-or-above plateau. When he stepped away after 2013, Welch had the best winning percentage in both Orange County and CIF-SS history. He still ranks first in the county and third in the section all time.

Welch won nine California Interscholastic Federation - Southern Section (CIF-SS) championships overall, including six in a seven-year span from 2005 to 2011. That included five in succession from 2005 to 2009. He was also victorious in all three California State Bowl Championship games coached: Canyon in 2006 (Division 1), St. Margaret's Episcopal School in 2008 (Small Schools - Division IV) and Santa Margarita Catholic in 2011 (Division I).

Welch is the only coach in California prep history to win three state championships with three different schools: Canyon in 2006, St. Margaret's Episcopal in 2008 and Santa Margarita Catholic in 2011.

At 3–0 all time in California State Bowl Championship games, Welch is one of just a dozen coaches who have three-or-more state football titles in California history (among all eras). He is tied for the second-most state crowns by a Southern Section coach and one of only three that are undefeated.

When combined with his perfect 3–0 mark in state championship games, Welch sports a career mark of 12–1 in all "championship games." In such CIF-SS contests, he boasted a record of 9-1 (.900). In all, the 12–1 win-loss ledger equates to a .923 winning percentage—unrivaled by any other coach. From the 2005 through the 2011 seasons, Welch was victorious (6–0) in a Southern Section championship game every year except the 2010 season. Reaching the postseason in 23 of his 25 seasons as a head coach, Welch's record in the playoffs was a sterling 57 wins versus 14 losses (.803).

Some of Welch's teams had impressive winning streaks, but they also enjoyed breaking them as well. The biggest such shocker came in Honolulu, Hawaii in 1990. After flying 3,000 miles, Canyon shut down Saint Louis, 40–0, and halted the Crusaders' state record of 55 wins in succession (regular and postseason). The other was in their stunning upset in the 2006 California State Championship Bowl game of vaunted De La Salle. Canyon put to rest the 21-game winning streak of the Spartans (regular and postseason).

Welch coached 19 CIF-SS Conference or Division "Players of the Year" selections in his career.

Welch won 246 of his first 300 games coached (82.0%). Only legendary coach Bob Ladouceur of De La Salle (Concord / North Coast Section) won more contests in both fewer games - 305 and fewer seasons - 23½.

Welch strung together two significant winning streaks in his tenure. Across the parts of three seasons, 1983, 1984 and 1985 at Canyon, the Cowboys won 46-consecutive. At St. Margaret's in the mid-2000s, the Tartans were victorious in 30-straight. Analyzed further, Welch can also claim a 41-game streak when counted across seasons at two schools from 2006 to 2009.

Welch guided his clubs to four undefeated seasons: Canyon in 1984 (14–0) and 1985 (14–0) and St. Margaret's in 2007 (14–0) and 2008 (15–0).

In his career, Welch strung together two streaks of his clubs winning 10-or-more games in succession for multiple seasons. First at Canyon from 1983 through 1988 (6) and another, longer streak with Canyon and St. Margaret's between 2002 and 2009 (8).

In their undefeated 2007 season, St. Margaret's scored an incredible 674 points and was undefeated. This total set the all-time single-season scoring record for Orange County. The very next season, in 2008, the club once again established another record when they amassed 742 points. That total has since been exceeded but still remains one of the highest marks the Southland has ever seen.

In 2008, St. Margaret's finished the campaign 15–0. With this, the Tartans became the first team in Orange County history to reach the 15-or-more win plateau and also the first to have a perfect record at that level, in a single season. St. Margaret's ran their county-record winning streak to 44 games.

Welch was selected to coach in prestigious prep all-star games featuring top graduating senior athletes. This included the annual North-South Shrine Classic at the Rose Bowl (Pasadena) in 1986 and 1987 and the Los Angeles Daily News All-Star Football Game Kickoff in 1984 and 1988. Additionally, in 2008, Welch coached in the inaugural Southern California Bowl, which pitted the Coastal Navy All-Stars (coached by Welch) versus the Inland Marines at Titan Stadium on the campus of Cal State Fullerton.

Welch's powerhouse teams of the early 1980s and mid 2000s were a regular fixture in the top tier of the Cal-Hi Sports (CHS) state poll rankings. From 1983 to 1985, the Cowboys finished in the final top-3 each season. The 2005-06 teams were also in the top-3 in both the Overall and Division 1 categories. MaxPreps.com crowned Canyon No. 1 in California at the close of both 2005 and 2006 seasons and recognized them in their final national poll in the top-15 each time. The run at St. Margaret's Episcopal saw a top-10 rankings all three seasons Welch was present including No. 1 in Division V for 2007. At Santa Margarita, the teams were ranked high at the end of 2011 and into midseason of 2012. Welch's clubs were also routinely recognized by other respected media outlets, associations and affiliates such as: studentsports.com, Rivals.com, ESPNHS.com, the Los Angeles Times, the Orange County Register and USA Today.

As Welch's success began to increase in the mid-1980s, he was invited to lecture and teach at a myriad of football camps and clinics throughout the Western United States. After appearing locally in places like Westlake Village, Bullhead City, Arizona, Los Angeles and Irvine, he was included on the staff at a prestigious prep camp held in Lake Tahoe where he was featured alongside Bob Ladouceur of Concord De La Salle. Between 1985 and 2007, Welch's energetic passion engaged audiences at the collegiate level at such schools as: Cal State-Northridge, USC, Nebraska, Fresno State, California (Berkeley), Brigham Young, Arizona State and UCLA. While in Lincoln, Welch established a relationship of mutual respect with Tom Osborne, head coach of the "Big Red" and College Football Hall of Fame member. He was also known to support local organizations as guest speaker or master of ceremonies, including the chamber of commerce, Boy Scouts and championship team reunions.

== Awards and honors ==
=== "Coach of the Year" Honors ===
Welch was bestowed with over two dozen "Coach of the Year" honors from various newspapers, online high school websites, coach's organizations and other outlets during his career. Many of those honors came in the latter part of Welch's career as the popularity of high school football increased, championship games at various levels were adopted and online coverage proliferated. Between the years of 2006 and 2011 alone, he garnered more than one dozen.

- 2006 The Signal (Santa Clarita Valley newspaper) "Coach of the Year"
- 2006 Football All Amateur Athletic Foundation Northern Division "Coach of the Year" (11-Man)
- 2006 CIF-SS / AAF Division II "Coach of the Year"
- 2006-07 California Coaches Association (all sports) "Coach of the Year"
- 2007 CIF-SS Northeast Division "Coach of the Year"
- 2008 CIF-SS East Valley Division "Coach of the Year"
- 2008 MaxPreps.com California Division IV State "Coach of the Year"
- 2009 Orange County Register "Orange County Coach of the Year"
- 2009 Los Angeles Daily News "Football Coach of the Decade" - 2000-09
- 2010 Orange County Register "Orange County Coach of the Year"
- 2010 Los Angeles Times Southland "Coach of the Year"
- 2011 ABC 7 New Southern California NFL "High School Coach of the Year"
- 2011 CIF-SS PAC-5 Division "Coach of the Year"

== Community / Media Popularity ==
The Signal newspaper has covered the landscape of news in the Santa Clarity Valley for over 100 years. Welch's 30-year career of coaching success and teaching at Canyon were chronicled by the newspaper from beginning to end and after he departed. In the latter portion of his time at Canyon and after moving on, Welch was repeatedly awarded with honors and tributes. Many of these came from reader polls sponsored by the newspaper. Welch's accomplishments, character and newsmaking ability were celebrated. As the age of social media exploded in the decade of the 2000s, Welch was selected for his coaching prowess, character, participant in dramatic sports events and newsmaker.

=== Historical high school athletic success ===
In December 2010, The Signal contacted 85 coaches and athletic directors in the area for their input on several facets of high schools sports history in the Santa Clarita Valley (SCV). Welch was tops in four categories of all-time success.

- Greatest sports character`
- Greatest coach
- Most significant sports coach
- Greatest sports moment - Canyon's upset of De La Salle

=== Annual "Newsmakers of the Year" awards ===
- 2005: "Newsmaker of the Year"
- 2006: Male Sports "Individual Newsmaker of the Year" (Co)

=== 10 greatest high school games of the last 25 years ===
Selected in Summer 2007

- No. 9 - Canyon defeated Moorpark (2006)
- No. 4 - Canyon defeated rival Hart (Newhall) (2005)
- No. 1 - Canyon won the CIF State Bowl Championship Game (2006)

== Post career honors ==
=== "The Crespi Man" & Hall of Fame ===
In 2010, Crespi High School, Welch's high school alma mater, selected him as "The Crespi Man." This distinct award honors the alumnus who incorporates several of the school's moral and spiritual values into their lives—those housed in learning, creativity, teamwork and tradition. At the same time, he was enshrined into Crespi's Hall of Fame.

=== Harry Welch Stadium ===
On March 7, 2007, just after he announced his departure from Canyon to pursue other challenges, the football facility at the high school was officially named "Harry Welch Stadium" in his honor. Welch was part of the school community for 37 years and enjoyed significant success on the gridiron and in the classroom.

=== Boy Scouts of America - Orange County Council "Men of Character" Award ===
In spring of 2010, Welch was selected by the Boy Scouts of America - Orange County Council as recipient of their "Men of Character" award. This honor is presented annually to distinguished men for their outstanding service to the community based on exhibiting the values of devotion to family, faith and community.

=== CIF-Southern Section Hall of Fame ===
The year of 2022 saw Welch inducted into another prestigious sports fraternity—the CIF-Southern Section Hall of Fame. Welch was one of 14 high school sports icons presented in the 2022 class—the section's 38th class overall.

=== California High School Football Hall of Fame ===
The inaugural class of the newly established California High School Football Hall of Fame was announced in the fall of 2022. The committee selected 100 players and 13 coaches, who through decades of prep gridiron competition from all over the state, are to be inducted to the inaugural class. Welch was one of the all-time coaches selected and will be formally enshrined in late 2023 at the Rose Bowl (Pasadena), the physical home of the Hall.

== Cancer diagnosis, recovery and awareness ==
In the summer of 2010, at age 65, Welch discovered he had prostate cancer after a fellow Crespi alumnus, who was a cancer survivor himself, urged him to get a checkup. After initial exams, a biopsy revealed the presence of cancer. Welch was informed that according to the Gleason Grading System, used to evaluate the prognosis of men with prostate cancer, his was categorized as an "aggressive 7."

Welch and wife Cindee met for two hours with specialist Dr. Jeffrey Yoshida to learn more about the cancer, surgery and post-surgery treatment options. Due to the progressive nature of the disease, Yoshida strongly recommended immediate surgery and the operation was performed on October 4, 2010. The radical prostatectomy, a full removal of the prostate, lasted nearly six hours. Yoshida gave Welch some real hope by saying the procedure would provide a 90 percent chance of survival and recommended a four-month recovery.

With the first game of his first season with his new team, Santa Margarita imminent, Welch made the announcement to his players. The stubborn coach took hardly any time off of the sidelines, returning just four days later for the Trinity League opening game versus Orange Lutheran.

From the beginning of the experience, Welch's objective was to turn the situation into a positive event in some fashion. He and his family wanted to give wider publicity to prostate cancer and the message that men of all ages should be vigilant about being screened on a regular basis. In short, Welch's primary goal was simple—to save lives.

Harry and wife Cindee decided to go public with his affliction to help educate and support other men throughout the nation—with a message of encouragement, support and comfort. With most men not knowing a great deal about the disease, he wanted to convey the fact that sixty-five percent of all prostate cancers are diagnosed in men over the age of 65. Experts recommend that all men age 50 and older have a PSA (prostate-specific antigen) test and digital rectal exam (DRE). Men in high-risk groups, like African-Americans and those with a family history of prostate cancer, should commence testing at age 45.

Welch utilized resources at his disposal to get the message out to a broader audience. Steve Fryer of the Orange County Register, Eric Sondheimer of the Los Angeles Times and Baxter Holmes of ESPN.com, along with networks such as Fox Sports and ESPN, provided valuable media support about the cause. This included newspaper articles, online stories and television broadcast segments. Before long, the Welch household was receiving calls from around the nation from men for information, advice and encouragement.

The following September (2011), Episode 5 of "Tough Knocks" featured Welch and his Santa Margarita team taking part in Prostate Cancer Awareness Month. Eagle's players, faculty members and club staff wore light blue wristbands as part of the effort to raise awareness about the disease. The focal point was Welch's own battle a year prior with prostate cancer

== Personal life ==
Welch is married to wife Cindee and he has two daughters, Lisa St. John and Julie Adam, and five grandchildren, Nicholas, Nathan, Kara, Evan and Riley. He enjoys watching sporting events, reading, travelling, entertaining friends, fine dining at local restaurants and walking his St. Bernard named Murphy. In addition, he assists the Athletic Information Director at Santa Margarita, Chuck Nan, with research on prep sports history in Southern California. Welch lives close to Santa Margarita campus in the community of Coto de Caza.
