= Seth Burnham =

American volleyball player

Personal information
- Nationality: American
- Born: May 31, 1977 (age 49); Santa Cruz, California, U.S.
- Hometown: Tarzana, California, U.S.
- Height: 6 ft 7 in (200 cm)
- Weight: 205 lb (93 kg)

Beach volleyball information

Current teammate
Years	Teammate
2009	Marcin Jagoda

Seth Burnham (born May 31, 1977 in Santa Cruz, California) is a male beach volleyball and volleyball player from the United States who participated at the NORCECA Circuit 2009 at Manzanillo playing with Marcin Jagoda. They finished in the 9th position.

Currently, Seth Burnham is an active volleyball coach and maintains a presence on the interactive volleyball website Volleyball 1on1 where he appears in instructional volleyball videos. He is in his third year as the head coach of the boys' volleyball program at Thousand Oaks High School.

== Clubs ==
- (Spain) PTV Malaga (2000–2001)

== Awards ==
=== Individuals ===
- 2000 NCAA All-Tournament Team

=== College Indoor ===
- 1998 and 2000 NCAA National Championship with UCLA
