= Rick W. Wright =

American orthopaedic surgeon

- Born: Sikeston, Missouri, USA

Academic background
- Education: BS, Biochemistry; MD, University of Missouri

Academic work
- Institutions: Vanderbilt University; Washington University School of Medicine

Ricky Wayne Wright is an American orthopedic surgeon and sports medicine specialist. He was the Jerome J. Gilden Distinguished Professor of Orthopaedic Surgery at Washington University School of Medicine before becoming the Dan Spengler, M.D., Chair in Orthopaedics at Vanderbilt University.

== Early life and education ==
Wright was born and raised in Sikeston, Missouri, where he graduated from Sikeston High School in 1980. Upon receiving his high school diploma, he attended the University of Missouri for his Bachelor of Science and medical degree. Wright completed his medical residency and internship in orthopaedics at Vanderbilt University Medical Center before becoming a fellow at the Minneapolis Sports Medicine Center.

== Career ==
Wright joined the faculty at Washington University School of Medicine in 1994 before earning his certification from the American Board of Orthopaedic Surgery in 1996. As a practicing sports medicine specialist, Wright was appointed the head team physician of the St. Louis Cardinals of Major League Baseball in 2005, having already worked with the St. Louis Rams of the National Football League and with the St. Louis Blues in the National Hockey League. During his tenure with the Rams, Wright received the Cabaud Memorial Award from the American Academy of Orthopaedic Surgeons (AAOS) for his paper Transcriptomic Signatures of Meniscal Tears and Articular Cartilage from Knees Undergoing Arthroscopic Partial Meniscectomy Show Evidence for Early Osteoarthritis. He stayed with the Rams until their move to Los Angeles in 2016 and helped them win two Super Bowls. As a result of his assistance with the St. Louis Blues, he was gifted three hours with the Stanley Cup following their 2019 Stanley Cup Finals win.

Following his appointment to head team physician in 2005, Wright also began directing Washington's orthopedic surgery residency program which later earned him a Distinguished Educator Award. While serving in this role, he became the principal investigator of the Multi-center ACL Revision Study, a research project which aimed to determine risk factors related to IKDC, KOOS and Marx activity rating scores. In 2010, Wright became a Full professor and was later appointed the Dr. Asa C. and Mrs. Dorothy W. Jones Professor in Orthopaedic Surgery at Washington University School of Medicine.

Beginning in 2013, Wright has remained a member of the ABOS Board of Directors. He and William Levine were first elected the co-directors of ABOS board of directors in 2013. Three years later, while serving as Washington's Jerome J. Gilden Distinguished Professor of Orthopaedic Surgery, he was appointed AOA 132nd president taking over for Regis J. O'Keefe. As a result of his medical research and experience, Wright was later elected president-elect of the American Board of Orthopaedic Surgery (ABOS) for a one year term from 2018 until 2019 and then president from 2019-present. He continued his research on ACL tears and was recognized by the academy with the 2019 Kappa Delta Ann Doner Vaughn Award. Wright left the University of Washington to become the chair of orthopaedic surgery at Vanderbilt University. He received their endowed chair position, the Dan Spengler, M.D., Chair in Orthopaedics, the following year.

== Controversy ==
Since 2021, several lawsuits have been filed against Wright alleging workplace misconduct and mistreatment of subordinates.

In 2023, the FBI began in investigation into the department that Wright leads.
