= Sikeston School District =

School district in Missouri, U.S.

Sikeston R-VI School District is centered in Sikeston, Missouri. The district includes several elementary and intermediate grade schools and Sikeston High School. During the 2008–2009 school year, there was a total of 3,759 students and 346 certified staff members enrolled in the Sikeston R-6 School District. The school colors are red and black and its mascot is the bulldog.

The district has sections in Scott and New Madrid counties, where it includes the vast majority of the Sikeston city limits, almost all of Miner, and all of Morehouse.

== Schools ==
Elementary schools

- Sikeston Kindergarten Center
- Lee Hunter Elementary School
- Southeast Elementary School
- Wing Elementary School - Opened in 2019

Middle school

- Sikeston Middle School

Junior high school

- Sikeston Junior High School

High school

- Sikeston High School

=== Former schools ===
- Morehouse Elementary School - The district began considering closing the school in April 2011. The decision to close the school was finalized in June 2011.
