= Blake DeWitt =

American baseball player (born 1985)

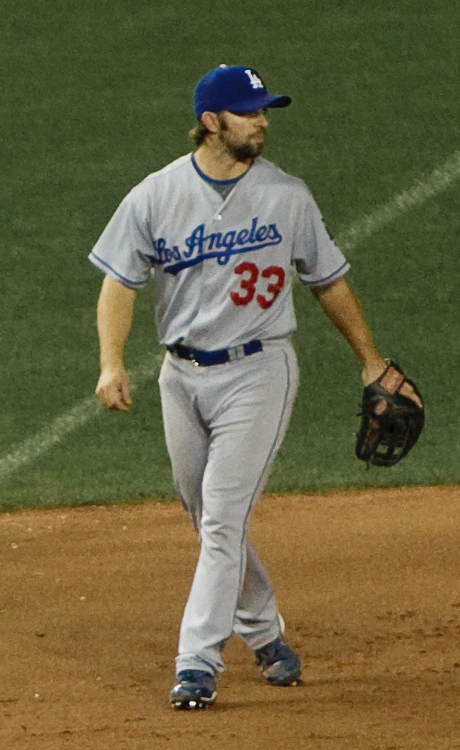
- DeWitt with the Los Angeles Dodgers in 2009
- Second baseman / Third baseman
- Born: August 20, 1985 (age 40); Sikeston, Missouri, U.S.
- Batted: Left Threw: Right

MLB debut
- March 31, 2008, for the Los Angeles Dodgers

Last MLB appearance
- April 19, 2013, for the Atlanta Braves

MLB statistics
- Batting average: .257
- Home runs: 21
- Runs batted in: 135
- Stats at Baseball Reference

Teams
- Los Angeles Dodgers (2008–2010); Chicago Cubs (2010–2012); Atlanta Braves (2013)

Blake Robert DeWitt (born August 20, 1985) is an American former professional baseball second baseman and third baseman. He played in Major League Baseball (MLB) for the Los Angeles Dodgers, Chicago Cubs, and Atlanta Braves.

== High school ==
As a senior shortstop at Sikeston High School in Sikeston, Missouri, he batted .558 with 15 home runs, 11 doubles, and 48 RBIs and was named to Baseball America's High School All-America first team, the Associated Press Class 3 all-state first team, and the Missouri High School Baseball Coaches Association Class 3 all-state first team. DeWitt is one of the few players in Missouri baseball history to be named first team all-state four times. In addition to his hitting prowess, DeWitt was an effective pitcher, winning a Missouri high school record 27 consecutive games and losing only 1. DeWitt led the Sikeston Bulldogs to two state championship appearances in his four years. DeWitt broke eight Missouri high school records in batting and pitching according to the state's governing athletic association, the Missouri State High School Activities Association.

He was scheduled to attend Georgia Tech, but he was drafted by the Los Angeles Dodgers in the first round of the June 2004 MLB draft and chose to play professional ball. He was rated as the best pure high school hitter entering the draft.

== Minor league career ==
He began his professional career as the starting third baseman for the Ogden Raptors in 2004 and was tabbed by Baseball America as the second-best prospect in the Pioneer League as well as the eighth-best prospect in the Dodgers organization.

In 2005, he hit for the cycle on June 5 while playing with the Columbus Catfish and went on to lead the Catfish in hits, doubles, and total bases. He was rated as the "Best Hitter for Average" in the Dodgers farm system while hitting .333 for Columbus.

In 2006 with the Vero Beach Dodgers, he was again ranked as the Dodgers' 8th best prospect by both Baseball America and Baseball Prospectus. He was named to the Florida State League All-Star team while hitting .339 with 18 homers and 61 RBIs for Vero Beach. He played for the North Shore Honu of the Hawaii Winter Baseball League following the season.

He began 2007 with the Class A-Advanced Inland Empire 66ers and hit .298 with 8 homers and 46 RBIs in 83 games, leading to a promotion to the Class AA Jacksonville Suns. He hit .281 in 45 games with the Suns the rest of the season.

== Los Angeles Dodgers ==
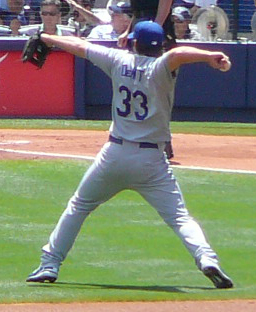
DeWitt with the Dodgers in 2008.

During spring training in 2008, injuries to Nomar Garciaparra, Andy LaRoche, and Tony Abreu, the team's top three projected third basemen, led to DeWitt getting a chance to play with the big league club. He became the Dodgers opening day starting third baseman and in his first at bat he singled off San Francisco Giants pitcher Barry Zito and went 5 for 9 with 3 walks in the 3-game series. DeWitt hit his first career home run off of Óliver Pérez of the New York Mets on May 5, 2008. The following night, he hit his second, a rare inside-the-park home run off of the Mets' Nelson Figueroa. The inside-the-park home run was the first for the Dodgers in 5 years. A local radio station, 1520 KRHW-AM, in DeWitt's hometown of Sikeston, Missouri became part of the Dodgers Radio Network so that residents of that town could follow his Major League Baseball career. DeWitt was named the National League's Rookie of the Month for the month of May, when he hit .322 with 5 HR and 18 RBI in 26 games.

Immediately following the team's acquisition of third basemen Casey Blake from the Cleveland Indians, DeWitt was optioned to the Las Vegas 51s, Dodgers' AAA minor league team, on July 26, 2008 and began to learn the second base position to better increase the clubs' depth at the position. This move proved wise as Jeff Kent became sidelined late in the season and DeWitt was recalled to Los Angeles to start at second base prior to the September 1st expansion of the rosters. He went on to be the starting second baseman for the Dodgers through the National League Divisional Series and Championship series, batting .167, but driving in six runs in eight games.

With the Dodgers' 2009 acquisition of second baseman Orlando Hudson, DeWitt lost his chance to compete for a starting job in spring training and spent the season shuttling back and forth between the Dodgers and AAA Albuquerque Isotopes. He appeared in just 31 games with the Dodgers in 2009.

In 2010, DeWitt became the Dodgers starting second baseman to begin the season. He appeared in 82 games for the team, hitting .270.

== Chicago Cubs ==
On July 31, 2010, DeWitt was traded along with minor league pitchers Brett Wallach and Kyle Smit to the Chicago Cubs for Ted Lilly and Ryan Theriot. He played in 53 games for the Cubs after the trade and hit .250 along with 4 home runs.

DeWitt played in 121 games for Chicago in 2011 in a reserve role, batting .265/.305/.413 with 5 HR and 26 RBI. He displayed typically low strikeout and walk rates, at 12.8% and 4.9% respectively, while also receiving 17 starts in the outfield, playing there for the first time in his career.

On February 6, 2012, DeWitt was designated for assignment to make room for Adrian Cardenas on the 40-man roster. Despite this, DeWitt made his second consecutive Opening Day roster, once again in a utility role. Struggling offensively in a part-time role, DeWitt was designated for assignment again on May 6. In 18 games with Chicago in 2012, he hit .138 (4-29) with 1 RBI. DeWitt eventually cleared waivers and was outrighted to Triple-A Iowa. DeWitt was limited to 30 games with the I-Cubs due to multiple injuries, and he hit .127 with 5 RBI. In October 2012, DeWitt elected minor league free agency.

== Atlanta Braves ==
In December 2012, DeWitt signed a minor league contract with the Atlanta Braves and was a non-roster invitee to spring training in 2013. At the end of Spring training, Dewitt was assigned to the Gwinnett Braves, the Triple-A affiliate of the Atlanta Braves. DeWitt was recalled on April 7, 2013, after the Braves placed first baseman Freddie Freeman on the 15-day D.L. with a right-oblique strain. DeWitt made 4 pinch-hit appearances, recording one hit, with Atlanta before he himself was placed on the disabled list on April 20. Amid speculation of retirement, DeWitt was released by the Braves on August 17, without making a rehab appearance.

== Personal life ==
April 2008 was declared "Blake DeWitt Month" in his hometown of Sikeston, Missouri by Mayor Mike Marshall. On November 25, 2008, DeWitt was presented with a key to the city and the Star of Sikeston award by Mayor Marshall. In the spring of 2009, his #6 was retired by his high school team at Sikeston.

Blake has a wife, Lauren, and one son, Rex, born in 2014.

Preceded by Geovany Soto	NL Rookie of the Month; May 2008	Succeeded by Jair Jurrjens
