= Crespi Carmelite High School =

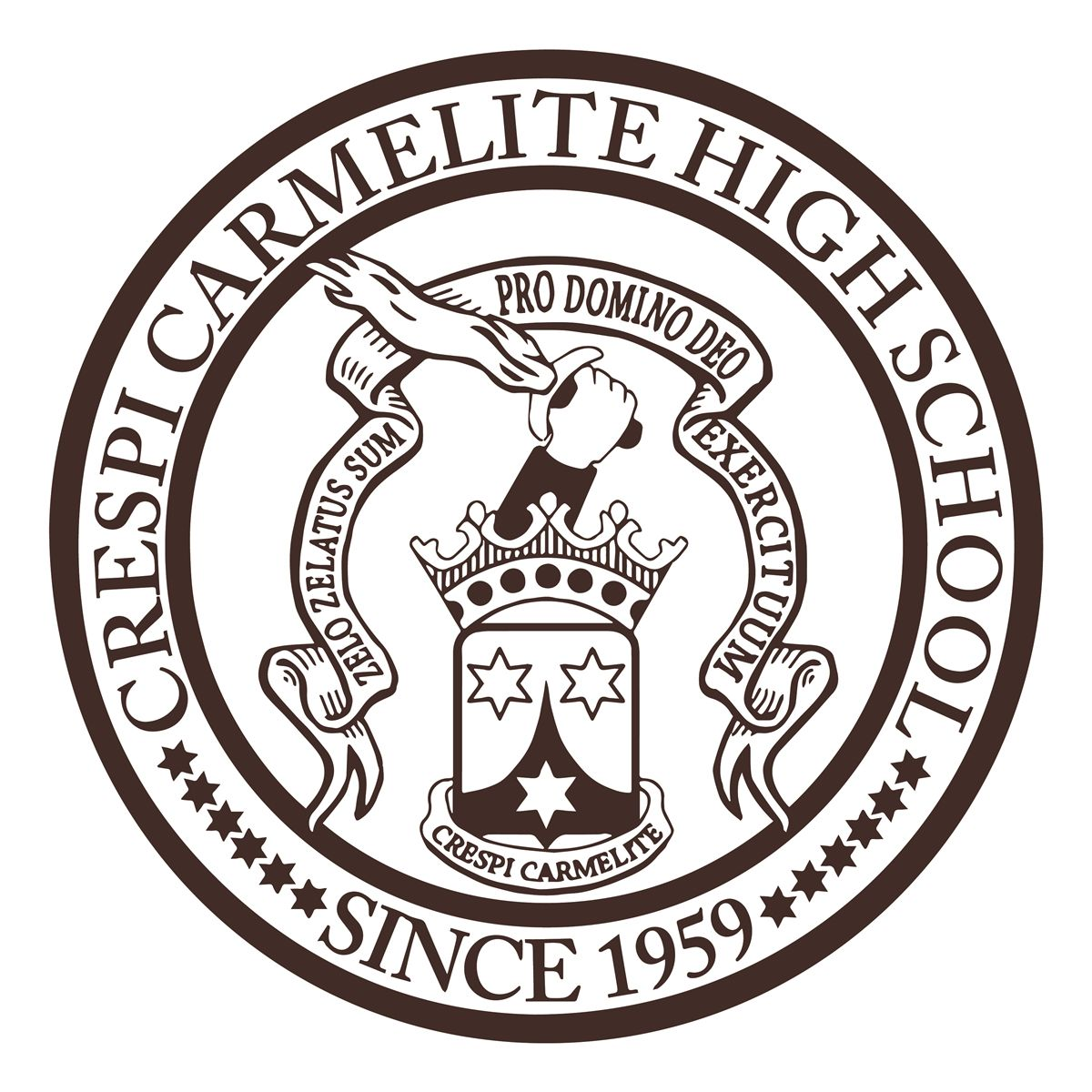
- Official logo of Crespi Carmelite High School

Location
- 5031 Alonzo Avenue; Encino, Los Angeles, California 91316; United States; 34°9′43.5″N 118°31′17″W

Information
- Type: Private, Day, College-prep
- Motto: Zelo Zelatus Sum Pro Domino Deo Exercituum. (With zeal have I been zealous for the Lord God of Hosts.)
- Religious affiliations: Catholic; Carmelites
- Patron saint: Our Lady of Mount Carmel
- Established: 1959
- Founder: Fr. Gus Carter, O.Carm
- President: Dr. Kenneth Foersch
- Principal: Dr. Liam Joyce
- Staff: 70
- Grades: 9–12
- Gender: Boys
- Enrollment: 500 (2024)
- Average class size: 23
- Student to teacher ratio: 13:1
- Campus size: 8 Acres
- Campus type: Suburban
- Colors: Brown, White and Gold
- Slogan: "Celt Pride"
- Athletics conference: CIF Southern Section; Mission League
- Sports: 14 sports
- Nickname: Celts
- Accreditation: Western Association of Schools and Colleges, Western Catholic Educational Association
- Newspaper: The Celt
- Yearbook: Los Encinos
- Tuition: $23,618
- Feeder schools: Greater Los Angeles Area
- Alumni: 7500
- Website: crespi.org

Crespi Carmelite High School, shortly known as Crespi, is a private Catholic all-boys four-year college preparatory high school located in Encino District, Los Angeles, California. It is part of the Archdiocese of Los Angeles.

The school was named for Friar Joan Crespí, and was founded in 1959 by the Carmelite religious order, and has been run by the Carmelites since that time.

== Academics ==
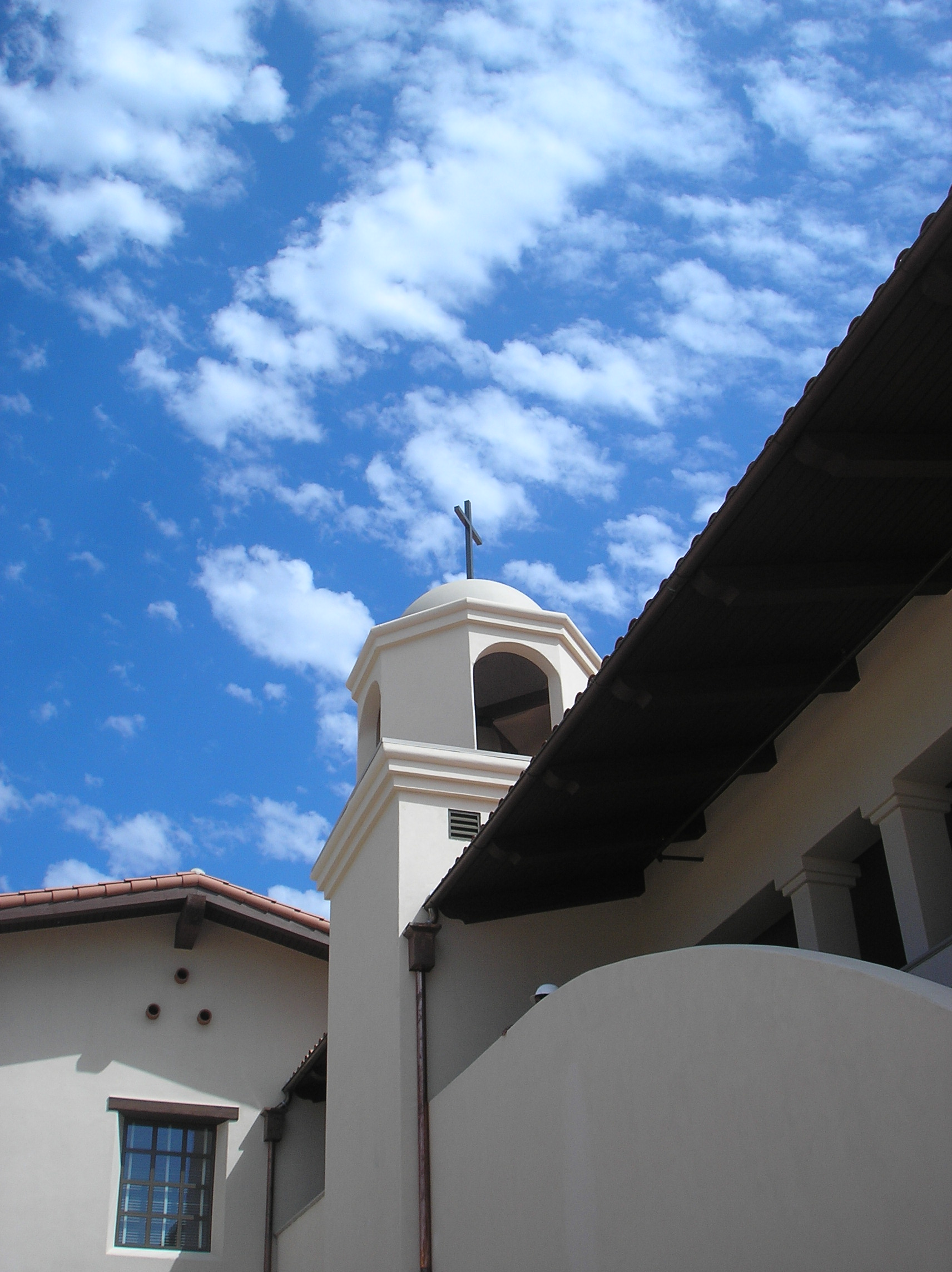
Crespi Fine Arts Arts Building

Crespi Carmelite High School offers a college-preparatory education. As of 2024–2025, the academic program offers 21 Advanced Placement (AP) courses and more than 15 Honors courses. Students have the opportunity to take Honors and AP courses beginning in 9th grade.

== Athletics ==
Crespi has won a total of fourteen California Interscholastic Federation (CIF) Southern Section division team titles.

- Baseball: 2003 (Division III); 2009 and 2023 (Division II)
- Basketball: "Back to Back" State Titles - 2015 (Division IV State Title) and 2016 (Division I State Title); Division championships - 2001 (Division IV-AA), 2010 (Division 4A), 2015 (Division 4AA)
- Football: 1986 (Big Five); 2004, 2005 (Division X)
- Track & Field: 1973 (Division 2-A); 2008 (Division III)
- Water Polo: 1981 (Division 2-A); 2019 (Division 6)
- Swimming: 2021 (Division 3)

== Notable alumni ==
=== Athletes ===
- Stephen Amritraj, ATP
- Bryan Bennett (born 1992), CFL
- Joe Carrabino, Australia NBL
- Randy Cross, NFL
- William Curran, NFL
- Raymond Davison, NFL pre-season, XFL
- Rick Dempsey, MLB
- Christian Fauria, NFL
- Joseph Fauria, NFL
- Sione Fua (born 1988), NFL
- Sean Gilmartin, MLB
- Hroniss Grasu (born 1991), NFL
- Chris Harper, CFL
- Ryon Healy, MLB
- Max Heidegger (born 1997), the Israeli Basketball Premier League and the EuroLeague
- Scott Heineman, MLB
- Brian Horwitz (born 1982), MLB
- Marcin Jagoda (born 1980), beach volleyball
- Babe Laufenberg, NFL
- Devin Lucien (born 1993), NFL
- De’Anthony Melton (born 1998), NBA
- Paul Mokeski, NBA
- Marcus Moore, CFL
- London Perrantes (born 1994), NBA and Israeli Basketball Premier League
- Trevor Plouffe, MLB
- Jeff Suppan, MLB
- Marvell Tell, NFL
- Charles Washington, NFL
- Harry Edward Welch, Jr., high school football coach
- Russell White, NFL
- Shaun Williams, NFL
- Brandon Williams (basketball, born 1999), NBA

=== Business/CEO ===
- Michael Lang, former CEO of Miramax, currently CEO of Pixel United
- Brodie Van Wagenen, general manager for the New York Mets, MLB (2018–2020)

=== Arts and entertainment ===
- Michael Angarano, actor
- Martin Donovan, actor
- Chris McGee, sports broadcaster, studio analyst for Spectrum SportsNet
- Gunnar Nelson, singer-songwriter, musician and recording artist
- Matthew Nelson, singer-songwriter, musician and recording artist
- William Sleeth, production designer and writer, winner 1996-1997 Emmy Award for writing for Bill Nye The Science Guy TV show
- Sergio Sylvestre, pop singer, 2015 winner of the popular Italian TV show Amici di Maria de Filippi

=== Crime ===
- Elliot Rodger, mass murderer responsible for murdering six people during the 2014 Isla Vista killings. Only attended Crespi for 9th grade, before transferring to William Howard Taft Charter High School.

=== Chefs ===
- Evan Funke, Los Angeles chef and restauranteur
