= Sikeston High School =

Location
- 200 South Pine Street; Sikeston, Missouri 63801; United States; 36°52′46″N 89°34′20″W

Information
- Type: Public High School
- Motto: Providing a Quality Education
- Established: c. 1904
- Status: Open
- Teaching staff: 64.02 (on an FTE basis)
- Enrollment: 944 (2023-2024)
- Student to teacher ratio: 15.26
- Colors: Red and black
- Mascot: Bulldogs
- Website: sh.sikestonr6.org

Sikeston High School, also known as SHS, is a public secondary school in Sikeston, Missouri. It is a part of the Sikeston School District.

The district includes the vast majority of the Sikeston city limits, almost all of Miner, and all of Morehouse.

== History ==
In 1868, a two-story public school building was constructed at the corner of West Malone and School Street. In 1884, this building was destroyed by a tornado. In 1885, a four-room building was rebuilt on this site and known as South Grade School. In 1900, another new building was constructed on this site. The Sikeston Public Schools system held its first four-year high school graduation commencement in 1904. In 1924, Sikeston built a segregated school which was used only by African American students until after the U.S. Supreme Court delivered the landmark ruling of Brown v. Board of Education in 1954 which declared segregation to be unconstitutional. The Lincoln School still stands in western Sikeston. The high school newspaper is known as The Bulldog Barker while the high school yearbook is known as The Growler.

== Buildings ==
The Sikeston Field House, the school's home gymnasium, was completed in 1969 as a multi-purpose athletic facility with a seating capacity exceeding 3,000 persons. After a bond issue was voted on and passed by the city, the building was updated and remodeled into a more attractive, state-of-the-art sporting arena in 1992. With improved lighting, sound and climate control, the Sikeston Field House has become a popular venue for non-athletic events as well. The Field House distinguishes itself with its large silver dome that is easily recognizable from the air.

== Academics ==
The Sikeston R-6 School District serves the educational needs of most of the city's residents and some of the nearby areas including the cities of Morehouse and Miner.

== Music ==
In 1934, Reid Jann started the High School band program. In 1940, Keith Collins (1916-1974) became Director of Bands and Supervisor of Music for Sikeston High School. Collins stayed in this position until 1970 except for time spent in the U.S. Marine Corps including as director of the West Coast Marine Air Corps Band in San Diego. In 1955, the school started an orchestra program under James Butler and hired future Missouri first lady Betty Cooper to take over the high school choir. Collins helped design the band building built for the new high school in 1960. Collins along with LeRoy Mason of Jackson High School formed the Southeast Missouri High School Band Association.

== Athletics ==
Sikeston High School has had a long history of excellence especially in football, boys' basketball, and baseball, sports in which they are among the state's leaders in playoff appearances.

=== Football ===
- In 1908, Sikeston High School played their first football game, 12 years before the National Football League was created. This was one of the first football teams west of the Mississippi River. Along with their opponents the Charleston High School Blue Jays, they are believed to be the first two football teams in Southeast Missouri. The team played their game behind the old South Grade School near the intersection of Malone and School streets between Stoddard and Scott streets. The players played their games in heavy sweaters without pads and the occasional soft leather "helmet."
- In 1911, Sikeston went undefeated with a record of 7–0 record by outscoring their opponents 178–0; the defense did not allow any opposing offense inside the 15-yard line during the entire season.
- In 1913, the Sikeston High School football team defeated the college of Cape Normal School by a score of 15–0.
- On November 15, 1915, Sikeston defeated Kennett by a score of 147–0.
- On October 4, 1919, Sikeston defeated Caruthersville by a score of 148–0, establishing a Southeast Missouri scoring record that still stands.
- In the 1950s, the team had a stellar record of 89 wins, 6 losses, and 3 ties, outscoring opponents 2,604 to 578. Between 1948 and 1953, the team went 46-0-3, 49 games without a loss, one of the longest streaks in state history.
- In 1967, the football went undefeated against local teams with future NFL and Division I players.
- In 1967, the team was ranked #1 in the conference after a 6–0 defeat of Poplar Bluff.
- The 1976 football team was undefeated, 10–0, in the regular season, winning their first conference title in 8 years.
- In 1982, the team qualified for the state playoffs for the second time in three seasons, but lost 3–0 to Parkway South in the opening round.
- In 1983, the team won the conference championship and had 12 players chosen for all-conference.
- In 1985, the Sikeston High School Bulldogs played their 100th football game against Charleston High School. The Bulldogs defeated the Blue Jays by a score of 20–19.
- In 1998, the Sikeston football program dropped from 5A to 4A due to school enrollment statistics.
- In 2008, the Sikeston High School Bulldogs played their 100th season. They finished with a record of 5-5 and one win out of the state playoffs
- In 2009, the Sikeston High School Bulldogs completed their first 10–0 season in 33 years, clinched their first SEMO Conference championship since 1998, and broke their all-time single-season scoring record set in 1960 with 388 points on the season. The Bulldogs went on to finish the season in the playoff semifinals losing 37–8 to Jefferson City Helias. The squad went deeper in the playoffs than any modern Bulldog team, finishing 13–1.
- In 2010, the Bulldogs football team finished 10-0 for the second straight year, which marked the first time that the school had back-to-back undefeated records since the 1954 and 1955 seasons. One of the season's highlights was a highly anticipated game against heated rival Cape Central, with both teams entering the game with identical 9-0 records. The Bulldogs defeated Cape Central 21–0 at Houck Stadium before an overflow crowd of 11,000 fans. The team broke several more school records, eclipsing some that the previous year's team had set, and even shattered some state records on their way to another semifinal appearance before losing to Warrenton 28–21. Sikeston finished its season with a final record of 13-1 for the second straight year.
- In 2011, the Sikeston football team became the fifth high school team in Missouri to win 600 games.

=== Cheerleading ===
- The Sikeston High School Cheerleading Squad has competed at the state level multiple times. The squad has placed in the top three spots in the state in the past 12 years they have competed. They took home the first-place plaque in 1995, 2003, 2006, 2007, 2008, 2009, 2012, 2019, and 2023.
- The cheerleading squad competed in the 2009 UCA National High School Cheerleading Competition leaving with a top 25 finish in the large varsity division.
- The school's Red Pepper Organization, which supports school athletics and promotes school spirit, was started in 1928 and is one of the oldest high school organizations in the state of Missouri and west of the Mississippi River. The Red Pepper Organization carries on an 80-year tradition with a week of activities for "Greenies," girls and other members who are not yet full Red Peppers. After several activities and requirements, the Greenies receive an official Red Pepper emblem.

=== Basketball ===
- In 1950, the Sikeston High School boys' basketball won 18 games in a row.
- In 1975, the boys' basketball team won the 4-A district championship.
- In 1984, the boys' team advanced to the first round of the state play-offs, making their first trip to state tournament since 1975.
- In 1995, the boys' basketball team secured a fourth-place finish in the 4A state tournament.
- The Sikeston High School boys' basketball team advanced to the Class 4 State Final Four in the "Show-Me Showdown" Tournament but eventually lost to St. Francis Borgia High School on March 11, 2006, by a score of 77–62. The basketball program has captured 20 district championships, which ranks among the most playoff appearances in state history. The Bulldogs faced the Borgia Knights once again in the state finals in March 2011. This time, the Bulldogs won 74–55 to capture their first ever state title. This was the first undefeated season in school history, as the Bulldogs finished with a record of 30–0.
- In 2016, the Lady Bulldogs won the SEMO Conference regular season outright for the first time in school history bringing the Bob Gray Award to Sikeston for the first time also.

=== Baseball ===
- The school's baseball team has a rich tradition of excellence, reaching the state playoffs 27 times, leaving only two other Missouri schools with more playoff appearances.
- In 1951, the baseball team took second place in the state competition.
- In 1958, the baseball team took third place in the state competition.
- IN 1960 and 1961 the baseball team took third in the state competition.
- In 1966, the baseball team took third place in the state competition.
- In 1976, the baseball team took third place in the state competition.
- In 2001, the baseball team took second place in the state competition.
- In 2002, the baseball team took fourth place in the state competition.
- In 2004, the baseball team took third place in the state competition.
- In 1978, the team won a district championship with a 14–3 record.
- In 1985, the team compiled a 13–4 record and won the 4-A District 1 title for the first time since 1982.
- In 1987, the baseball team compiled a 17–4 record and captured the district championship.
- In 1995, the team were 4A district champions.

Sikeston High School notable players:

- Blake DeWitt, 1st-round draft pick in 2004 for the Los Angeles Dodgers DeWitt, between 2001 and 2004, set or tied the following state high school baseball records: most total bases in a career (349); most hits in a career (186); most doubles in a career (50); most RBIs in a career (167); most runs scored in a career (167); most assists in a career (235); and most consecutive wins (27, March 27, 2001, to June 4, 2004).

=== Debate ===
- In 1940, the Sikeston debate team won a district tournament. The Chaffee and Sikeston debate teams tied for the district championship in Cape Girardeau, but Sikeston emerged victorious from the extra round. The Sikeston debate coaches were Mr. and Mrs. Garland Parker.
- In 1948, at the National Forensic League tournament held at Cape Girardeau, the Sikeston representatives placed fifth in the state for all forensic activities and were tied with Jennings, Missouri, for fourth place in debate. This was the second school year that the National Forensic League chapter had been in operation in Sikeston since it was reorganized in 1946. The coaches were Miss Mary Ellen Bailey and Mr. Robert Walker.
- In 1951, under debate coach Robert Walker, Sikeston High School led the state in membership and activity points awards conferred by the National Forensic League. The 44 points attained by Sikeston surpassed the record of any other school in the state, including Sedalia and Independence which ranked second and third respectively. Sikeston High School ranked second in the state in the number of students participating in debate with 37 debaters. "The principal reason for Sikeston's high rank is its policy of mass participation which stresses speech for the many instead of the talented few." The year 1951 was also the first year that debating was under the direction of the Missouri State High School Athletic and Activity Association, of which Sikeston's superintendent Mr. Lynn Twitty, was president.
- In 1966, high school freshman Mike Struwe won second place in the annual state congress of the National Forensic League, a speaking contest held in Jefferson City.

=== Golf ===
- In 1968, the Sikeston team went to the state tournament.
- In 1969, the Sikeston team took 2nd place in the District meet, finishing the season with an 8–1 record.
- In 1985, the Sikeston team had a 12–2 record, finishing 10th at state.
- In 2014, Sikeston golfer Gabe Wheeler finished in third place at the Class 3 state golf tournament.
- In 2017, Sikeston Golfers Luke Selvig and Luke Blanton qualify for sectionals, as well as making the all-district team.
- In 2018, Sikeston Golfer Luke Selvig qualifies for the class 3 sectional tournament.
- In 2019, Sikeston Golfers Austin Crawford and Leighton Tarter qualify for the class 3 sectional tournament. As well as Austin Crawford making the all-district team.

=== Soccer ===
- Scott Ellis Droddy holds the Missouri state record for the most career saves as a goalie (1,455 total) as of 2014; Droddy was also a shortstop for Florissant Valley Community College in St. Louis.
- In 2004, Sikeston High School achieved its first soccer district championship.
- In 2007, Blake Taylor became the first two-time all-state soccer player in school history. He has held numerous school scoring records.
- In 2011, the Sikeston soccer team set many records and finished with a record of 20–5, their best season in school history allowing them to reach the state quarterfinals.
- In 2012, the Sikeston soccer team achieved their first conference title in school history.

=== Softball ===
- In 1984, the softball team compiled a record of 11–1, beating Poplar Bluff 9–1 in the Sikeston Invitational Tournament.
- In 2014, the Sikeston softball team reached their first district final in school history.

=== Tennis ===
- In 1972, the boys' tennis team had a perfect season with eight wins, no losses and one tie, winning a district team championship.
- Between 1975 and 1978, the girls' tennis team won four consecutive district championships and had undefeated seasons in 1976 and 1978.
- In 1985, the boys' tennis team finished 12–2 with only two losses to Cape Central.
- In 1986, the girls' tennis team finished 10–2 with only two losses to Cape Central.
- In 1995, the boys' tennis team were district champs, finishing with an undefeated 10–0 record.
- In 2006 and 2007, Jenni DeWitt, sister of Blake DeWitt, came in fourth-place in the Class 1 state singles tournament. She was undefeated during the regular season in her freshman and senior years and won first place in district singles all four years.

=== Track And Field ===
- George Woods won two Olympic silver medals in the shot put.
- In 1983, the boys' track team won the school's first-ever conference title while the girls' track team set a record for the 1600-meter relay.
- In 1984, Karlos Draper set a state record in the 400-meter dash with a time of 47.70 seconds.
- In 1986, the boys' track team finished third at state in the 800 meter relay.
- In 1987, the Jimmy Williams broke his school record in the triple jump, Sherry Cox set a record in the 3200 meters, Malynda Turk set a record in high jump, and Allison Simmons set records in the 100 and 300 hurdles.
- In 1990, Bryon Howard had a long jump length of 24–3.0, 5th best ever in the state.
- Marshaun West, long jump state champion in 1995, became a track All-American broke the Notre Dame Fighting Irish long jump record at 25'8".
- Tina Collins, high jump state champion in 1991.
- Michael Colon, triple jump state champion in 2003.
- Sikeston won four straight district track titles from 2001 through 2004.
- In 2005, Tyler Woodson captured first place in the 110 meter high hurdles at the Class 3 MSHSAA Track and Field Championships.
- Cal Lane set three Sikeston High School track records: 24 foot 9 1/2 inches in the long jump, 49 feet and 9 inches in the triple jump, and 6 feet 11 inches in the high jump, placing first in long jump and triple jump in state competition. He led the Bulldogs' 2009 track team to a Class 3 state title by scoring 26 of the team's 43 points.
- The Sikeston High School boys' track and field team tied for 1st place with St. Clair High School at the 2009 Class 3 track and field state meet, to win its first athletic state championship in school history.
- Betsy Borgsmiller, high jump state champion in 2011.
- In 2012, for the first time in school history, the Sikeston Bulldogs won a state relay championship with Steven Baker, Kyland Gross, Spenser Clark, and Nick Nichols winning the 4x200-meter relay event during the Class 3 State Championship Meet.
- In 2013, Steven Baker, Kyland Gross, Spenser Clark, and Nick Nichols won the 4x200-meter relay and the 4x100-meter relay events during the Class 3 State Championship Meet.

=== Volleyball ===
- In 1987, the Sikeston Lady Bulldogs won the District Tournament for the second year in a row. All-Conference players were: Jesse Patterson (unanimous choice), Monique Geralds, Tressie Williams, and Shelby White. Coached by Janie Merrick.
- The Sikeston High School Lady Bulldogs received first place in the Silver Bracket of the B.A. Sports/SEMO Classic Volleyball Tournament during the 2001–2002 season. They defeated the Zalma High School Lady Bulldogs in the tournament championship match.

=== Wrestling ===
- In 1983, the wrestling team won the conference title, and five wrestlers qualified for the state tournament, taking 8th place as a team.
- On February 24, 1983, Tim Thomure captured the first-ever individual wrestling championship for Sikeston High School at a Missouri 4A tournament held in Columbia, Missouri.
- In 1984, the wrestling team sent six wrestlers to the state tournament.
- In 1985, the wrestling team sent five wrestlers to the state tournament with Billy Ruby finishing 4th at state.

== Alumni ==
- Brandon Barnes, a former NFL player
- Neal E. Boyd, opera singer
- Kristina Curry Rogers, dinosaur paleontologist and professor at Macalester College
- Kenneth Dement, a College Football Hall of Fame football player and attorney
- Blake DeWitt, played second base and third base for the Chicago Cubs
- Lance Rhodes, college baseball coach
- George A. Russell, 1938, president of the University of Missouri System
- Morgan Strebler, Mentalist/Illusionist who received the 2011 Merlin award
- Terry Teachout, author
- Robert Vaughan, author
- James Wilder Sr., a former NFL player
- Rick W. Wright, orthopedic surgeon and sports medicine specialist
