= 2007 NORCECA Beach Volleyball Circuit (Puerto Rico) =

Tournament details
- Host country: Puerto Rico
- Dates: May 18–20, 2007
- Teams: 26
- Venue(s): El Alambique Beach, Isla Verde (in Carolina host cities)

The 2007 NORCECA Beach Volleyball Circuit at Puerto Rico was held May 18–20, 2007 in Carolina, Puerto Rico. It was the third leg of the NORCECA Beach Volleyball Circuit 2007.

== Women's competition ==
RANK	FINAL RANKING	EARNINGS	POINTS
1st place, gold medalist(s)	Yantín - Santiago (PUR)	US$1,500.00	150
2nd place, silver medalist(s)	Suero - Almánzar (DOM)	US$1,000.00	135
3rd place, bronze medalist(s)	Ruiz - Vélez (PUR)	US$750.00	120
4.	Flores - Ramos (PUR)	US$550.00	105
5.	Niemczewska - Moppett (CAN)	US$400.00	90
6.	Orellana - Ramírez (GUA)	US$350.00	75
7.	Rabell - Ruiz (PUR)	US$250.00	60
8.	Morales - Alfaro (CRC)	US$200.00	45
9.	Molina - Soler (ESA)		30
10.	Rabell - Rabell (PUR)		15
11.	Cleary - Lombardi (USA)		10
12.	Lewis - Whitehall (BAR)		5
13.	Davis - Joseph (TTO)		0

== Men's competition ==
RANK	FINAL RANKING	EARNINGS	POINTS
1st place, gold medalist(s)	Barron - Szymanski (USA)	US$1,500.00	150
2nd place, silver medalist(s)	Otero - Rivera (PUR)	US$1,000.00	135
3rd place, bronze medalist(s)	Araya - Guevara (CRC)	US$750.00	120
4.	Irrizarry - Rodríguez (PUR)	US$550.00	105
5.	Pasieka - Sewell (CAN)	US$400.00	90
6.	Oxley - Gittens (BAR)	US$350.00	75
7.	Méndez - González (PUR)	US$250.00	60
8.	Vargas - De La Rosa (DOM)	US$200.00	45
9.	Acosta - Gil (PUR)		30
10.	Medrano - Vargas (ESA)		15
11.	Rankin - Thompson (CAY)		10
12.	Bolaños - González (GUA)		5
13.	Seabrookes - Hodges (SKN)		0
