= 2007 NORCECA Beach Volleyball Circuit (Trinidad and Tobago) =

Tournament details
- Host country: Trinidad and Tobago
- Dates: May 25–27, 2007
- Teams: 12
- Venue(s): Saith Park, Chaguanas (in Port of Spain host cities)

The 2007 NORCECA Beach Volleyball Circuit at Trinidad and Tobago was held May 25–27, 2007 in Chaguanas, Trinidad and Tobago. It was the fourth leg of the NORCECA Beach Volleyball Circuit 2007.

== Women's competition ==
RANK	FINAL RANKING	EARNINGS	POINTS
1st place, gold medalist(s)	Yantín - Ruiz (PUR)	US$1,500.00	150
2nd place, silver medalist(s)	Canet - Ballar (CUB)	US$1,000.00	135
3rd place, bronze medalist(s)	Miguel - Danilova (CAN)	US$750.00	120
4.	Orellana - Ramírez (GUA)	US$550.00	105
5.	Santiago - Vélez (PUR)	US$400.00	90
6.	Davis - Joseph (TTO)	US$350.00	75
7.	Morales - Alfaro (CRC)	US$250.00	60
8.	Woodenffe - Philip (TTO)	US$200.00	45
9.	Ursillo - McFarland (USA)		30
10.	Lewis - Whitehall (BAR)		15
11.	Woodley - Campbell (VIN)		10
12.	Suero - Almánzar (DOM)		5
