= 2007 NORCECA Beach Volleyball Circuit (Santo Domingo) =

Tournament details
- Host country: Dominican Republic
- Dates: April 6–8, 2007
- Teams: 25
- Venue: Boca Chica Beach (in Boca Chica host cities)

The 2007 NORCECA Beach Volleyball Circuit at Boca Chica was held from April 6 to 8 2007 in Boca Chica, Dominican Republic. It was the first leg of the NORCECA Beach Volleyball Circuit 2007.

== Women's competition ==
RANK	FINAL RANKING	EARNINGS	POINTS
1st place, gold medalist(s)	Roca - Polzin (USA)	US$1,500.00	150
2nd place, silver medalist(s)	Martin - Cooke (CAN)	US$1,000.00	135
3rd place, bronze medalist(s)	Canet - Ballar (CUB)	US$750.00	120
4.	Morales - Alfaro (CRC)	US$550.00	105
5.	Ruiz - Ramos (PUR)	US$400.00	90
6.	Suero - Almánzar (DOM)	US$350.00	75
7.	Orellana - Ramírez (GUA)	US$250.00	60
8.	Molina - Soler (ESA)	US$200.00	45
9.	Restituyo - Piñeiro (DOM)		30
10.	Burgos - Ángeles (DOM)		15
11.	Fabian - Carmona (DOM)		10
12.	Woodenffe - Philip (TTO)		5

== Men's competition ==
RANK	FINAL RANKING	EARNINGS	POINTS
1st place, gold medalist(s)	Wong - Stolfus (USA)	US$1,500.00	150
2nd place, silver medalist(s)	Araya - Guevara (CRC)	US$1,000.00	135
3rd place, bronze medalist(s)	Ramírez - Kindelán (CUB)	US$750.00	120
4.	Bolaños - González (GUA)	US$550.00	105
5.	Otero - Rivera (PUR)	US$400.00	90
6.	Medrano - Vargas (ESA)	US$350.00	75
7.	Rojas - Flores (DOM)	US$250.00	60
8.	Underwood - Erazo (PUR)	US$200.00	45
9.	Rankin - Thompson (CAY)		30
10.	Vargas - De La Rosa (DOM)		15
11.	Seabrookes - Hodges (SKN)		10
12.	Pérez - Pozo (DOM)		5
13.	Francois - Morrison (TTO)		0
