= 2009 NORCECA Beach Volleyball Circuit (Boca Chica) =

Tournament details
- Host country: Dominican Republic
- Dates: April 10–12, 2009
- Teams: 25
- Venue: Boca Chica Beach (in Boca Chica host cities)

The 2009 NORCECA Beach Volleyball Circuit at Boca Chica was held April 10–12, 2009 in Boca Chica, Dominican Republic. It was the third leg of the NORCECA Beach Volleyball Circuit 2009.

== Women's competition ==
RANK	FINAL RANKING	EARNINGS	POINTS
1st place, gold medalist(s)	Sinal - Ballar (CUB)	US$1,700.00	200
2nd place, silver medalist(s)	Morales - Alfaro (CRC)	US$1,000.00	180
3rd place, bronze medalist(s)	Virgen - Cruz (MEX)	US$750.00	160
4.	Orellana - Ramírez (GUA)	US$500.00	140
5.	Van Fleet - Smith (USA)	US$400.00	110
6.	Long - Rodrigue (CAN)	US$300.00	100
7.	Beauchamp - García (PUR)	US$200.00	80
8.	Del Rosario - Del Rosario (DOM)	US$150.00	70
9.	Fabian - Restituyo (DOM)		55
10.	Joseph - Phillip (TTO)		45
11.	Hamilton - Mann (LCA)		35

== Men's competition ==
RANK	FINAL RANKING	EARNINGS	POINTS
1st place, gold medalist(s)	González - Peña (CUB)	US$1,700.00	200
2nd place, silver medalist(s)	Bruning - Wight (USA)	US$1,000.00	180
3rd place, bronze medalist(s)	Irrizarry - Rodríguez (PUR)	US$750.00	160
4.	Araya - Piskulich (CRC)	US$500.00	140
5.	Pérez - Recio (DOM)	US$400.00	110
6.	Rankin - Thompson (CAY)	US$300.00	100
7.	Lewis - Wilson (JAM)	US$200.00	80
8.	Bolaños - Garrido (GUA)	US$150.00	70
9.	Medrano - Vargas (ESA)		55
10.	Otero - Gil (PUR)		45
11.	Fabian - Sánchez (DOM)		35
12.	Francois - Rivers (TTO)		25
13.	López - Peña (NCA)		15
14.	Ozuna - Pineda (GUA)		10

== See also ==
- NORCECA Beach Volleyball Circuit 2009
