= 2007 Women's Pan-American Volleyball Cup squads =

This article shows all participating team squads at the 2007 Women's Pan-American Volleyball Cup, held from June 19 to June 30, 2007 in

Colima Mexico.

== Argentina ==
- Head Coach: Carlos Di Leonardo

#	Name	Date of birth	Height	Weight	Spike	Block
1	Yamila Nizetich	27.01.1989
2	Sabrina Segui	12.05.1978	180	68	282	271
3	Viviana Dominko (c)
4	Leticia Boscacci	08.11.1985
6	Karina Pacheco
7	Ileana Leyendeker	14.10.1986
9	Patricia Oillataguerre
11	Antonella Bortolozzi
14	Belén Roldán
15	Vanina Domke
16	María Boglione
17	Tatiana Rizzo

== Brazil ==
- Head Coach: Luizomar De Moura

#	Name	Date of birth	Height	Weight	Spike	Block
3	Erica Adachi
4	Camila Brait
7	Camila Monteiro
8	Betina Schmidt
9	Silvana Papini
10	Priscila Daroit
12	Natalia Pereira
13	Amanda Francisco
14	Renata Maggioni
15	Maria Silva
17	Tandara Caixeta
18	Ingrid Felix

== Canada ==
- Head Coach: Naoki Miyashita

#	Name	Date of birth	Height	Weight	Spike	Block
2	Tara Smart
3	Larissa Cundy
4	Tammy Mahon
5	Tiffany Dodds
8	Stephanie Penner
9	Emily Cordonier (c)
10	Stacey Gordon
11	Nadine Alphonse
12	Sherline Tasha Holness
13	Falin Schaefer
14	Shelley Chalmers
16	Annie Levesque

== Costa Rica ==
- Head Coach: Eladio Vargas

#	Name	Date of birth	Height	Weight	Spike	Block
1	Karen Cope
2	Catalina Fernández
6	Angela Willis
7	Mariela Quesada
9	Verania Willis (c)
10	Paola Ramírez
11	Onicka Pinock
12	Angélica Jiménez
13	Janelle Johnson
14	Irene Fonseca
16	Kimberly Palmer
17	Marianela Alfaro

== Cuba ==
- Head Coach: Antonio Perdomo

#	Name	Date of birth	Height	Weight	Spike	Block
1	Yumilka Ruiz (c)	08.05.1978	180	63	326	305
2	Yanelis Santos	30.03.1986	183	71	315	312
3	Nancy Carrillo	11.01.1986	190	74	318	315
4	Yenisey González	23.08.1983	193	67	315	312
6	Daimí Ramírez	08.10.1983	176	67	305	290
9	Rachel Sánchez	09.01.1989	188	75	325	320
10	Yusleinis Herrera	12.03.1984	180	67	312	310
11	Liana Mesa Luaces	26.12.1977	179	70	318	307
12	Rosir Calderón	28.12.1984	191	66	330	325
14	Kenia Carcaces	22.01.1986	188	69	308	306
15	Yusidey Silié	11.11.1984	183	80	316	300
18	Zoila Barros	06.08.1976	188	76	325	312

== Dominican Republic ==
- Head Coach: Beato Miguel Cruz

#	Name	Date of birth	Height	Weight	Spike	Block
1	Annerys Vargas	07.08.1981	194	70	325	315
2	Rosalín Ángeles	23.07.1985	189	61	310	300
4	Sidarka Núñez	25.06.1984	188	58	312	308
5	Brenda Castillo	05.06.1992	167	55	220	270
6	Carmen Rosa Caso	29.11.1981	168	59	243	241
7	Sofía Mercedes	25.05.1976	185	70	306	298
8	Gina Del Rosario	12.05.1986	189	61	310	300
9	Nuris Arias	20.05.1973	190	78	315	306
10	Milagros Cabral	17.10.1978	181	63	308	305
13	Cindy Rondón	12.11.1988	189	61	312	305
15	Cosiri Rodríguez (c)	30.08.1977	191	72	313	305
18	Bethania de la Cruz	13.05.1989	188	58	322	305

== Mexico ==
- Head Coach: Macario González

#	Name	Date of birth	Height	Weight	Spike	Block
2	Migdalel Ruiz (c)
3	Célida Córdova
4	Xitlali Herrera
5	Nancy Ortega
7	Alejandra Acosta
10	Martha Revuelta	06.09.1986	176	77	295	287
12	Claudia Rodríguez
13	Mariana López
14	Zaira Orellana
16	Victoria Castillejas
17	Vanessa Virgen
18	Diana Rubio

== Peru ==
- Head Coach: Enio de Figueiredo

#	Name	Date of birth	Height	Weight	Spike	Block
1	Sara Joya
2	Mirtha Uribe	12.03.1985	182	67	297	286
3	Verónica Contreras	08.06.1977	174	63	280	282
4	Patricia Soto	10.02.1980	179	67	300	295
5	Vanessa Palacios	03.07.1984	167	66	255	250
6	Jessenia Uceda
7	Yulissa Zamudio
9	Carla Tristán
10	Leyla Chihuán (c)
11	Luren Baylon
14	Elena Keldibekova
17	Pietra Schiappa

== Puerto Rico ==
- Head Coach: Juan Carlos Núñez

#	Name	Date of birth	Height	Weight	Spike	Block
1	Deborah Seilhamer	10.04.1985	182	68	280	272
3	Vilmarie Mojica (c)	13.08.1985	177	63	295	274
4	Tatiana Encarnación
5	Sarai Álvarez	03.04.1986	189	61	295	286
6	Michelle Cardona	05.09.1981	172	50	290	259
8	Eva Cruz	22.01.1974	182	72	305	290
9	Áurea Cruz	10.01.1982	182	63	310	290
10	Vanessa Vélez
11	Karina Ocasio	08.01.1985	192	76	298	288
13	Dariam Acevedo
15	Shanon Torregrosa	11.02.1981	182	68	307	287
17	Sheila Ocasio	17.11.1982	192	74	310	292

== Trinidad and Tobago ==
- Head Coach: Francisco Cruz Jiménez

#	Name	Date of birth	Height	Weight	Spike	Block
1	Cassia Ferreira (c)
5	Karen Moses
6	Sinead Jack
8	Darlene Ramdin
9	Rheeza Grant
11	Malika Charles
12	Renele Forde
13	Carleen Williams
14	Nikita Abbot
15	Taila De Souza
16	Kristle Esdelle
17	Shula Hamilton

== United States ==
- Head Coach: Lang Ping

#	Name	Date of birth	Height	Weight	Spike	Block
3	Maurelle Hampton
6	Tracy Stalls
7	Laura Tomes
8	Katherine Wilkins
9	Jennifer Joines
10	Cynthia Barboza
11	Robyn Ah Mow-Santos (c)
13	Katie Olsovsky
14	Candance Lee
15	Courtney Thompson
16	Lindsey Hunter
18	Casandra busse

== Uruguay ==
- Head Coach: Rafael Codina

#	Name	Date of birth	Height	Weight	Spike	Block
1	Florencia Aguirre
2	María Victoria Aguirre
6	Cecila Frattini
7	Paola Galusso
9	Lucía Guigou
10	Alejandra Jaume
11	Marcela Jaume (c)
12	Eugenia Nieto
14	Fabiana Galusso
15	Sofía Levrini
17	Valeria Santo
18	Julieta Purtscher
