= 2007 NORCECA Beach Volleyball Circuit (Guatemala) =

Tournament details
- Host country: Guatemala
- Dates: April 6–8, 2007
- Teams: 26
- Venue: Campo Marte (in Guatemala City host cities)

The 2007 NORCECA Beach Volleyball Circuit at Guatemala was held April 20–22, 2007 in Guatemala City, Guatemala. It was the second leg of the NORCECA Beach Volleyball Circuit 2007.

== Women's competition ==
RANK	FINAL RANKING	EARNINGS	POINTS
1st place, gold medalist(s)	Ruiz - Ramos (PUR)	US$1,500.00	150
2nd place, silver medalist(s)	Suero - Almánzar (DOM)	US$1,000.00	135
3rd place, bronze medalist(s)	Pothhaar - Czerveniak (CAN)	US$750.00	120
4.	Morales - Alfaro (CRC)	US$550.00	105
5.	Cleary - Kropp (USA)	US$400.00	90
6.	Orellana - Ramírez (GUA)	US$350.00	75
7.	Canet - Ballar (CUB)	US$250.00	60
8.	Molina - Soler (ESA)	US$200.00	45
9.	Rostrán - Carcache (NIC)		30
10.	Burmester - López (GUA)		15
11.	Euceda - Mackay (HON)		10
12.	Bolaños - González (GUA)		5

== Men's competition ==
RANK	FINAL RANKING	EARNINGS	POINTS
1st place, gold medalist(s)	Ramírez - Kindelán (CUB)	US$1,500.00	150
2nd place, silver medalist(s)	Otero - Rivera (PUR)	US$1,000.00	135
3rd place, bronze medalist(s)	Torsone - Thompson (USA)	US$750.00	120
4.	Underwood - Gil (PUR)	US$550.00	105
5.	Calderon - Castro (NIC)	US$400.00	90
6.	Araya - Guevara (CRC)	US$350.00	75
7.	Pérez - Pozo (DOM)	US$250.00	60
8.	Medrano - Vargas (ESA)	US$200.00	45
9.	Woods - Baide (HON)		30
10.	Rankin - Thompson (CAY)		15
11.	Seabrookes - Hodges (SKN)		10
12.	Francois - Morrison (TTO)		5
13.	Alvarado - Osuna (GUA)		0
