= NORCECA Beach Volleyball Circuit 2007 =

Volleyball competitions held in North America

Tournament details
- Host country: various
- Dates: April – May, 2007
- Venue: various (in 4 host cities)

The 2007 NORCECA Beach Volleyball Circuit is a North American beach volleyball tour. The tour consists of seven tournaments with both genders.

== Tournaments ==
- Boca Chica Tournament, Dominican Republic – 6–8 April 2007
- Guatemala City Tournament, Guatemala – 20–22 April 2007
- Carolina, Puerto Rico Tournament – 18–20 May 2007
- Port of Spain Tournament, Trinidad and Tobago – 25–27 May 2007 (Women's Only)

== Tournament results ==
=== Women ===
Event:	Gold:	Silver:	Bronze:
Presidente Light Boca Chica Tournament	(United States) Roca - Polzin	(Canada) Martin - Cooke	(Cuba) Canet - Ballar
Guatemala City Tournament	(Puerto Rico) López - Ruíz	(Dominican Republic) Suero - Almánzar	(Canada) Pothhaar - Czerveniak
Coors Light Carolina Tournament	(Puerto Rico) Santiago - Yantín	(Dominican Republic) Suero - Almánzar	(Puerto Rico) Vélez - Ruíz
Spike Down Tournament	(Puerto Rico) Yantín - Ruíz	(Cuba) Canet - Ballar	(Canada) Miguel - Danilova

=== Men ===
Event:	Gold:	Silver:	Bronze:
Presidente Light Boca Chica Tournament	(United States) Wong1 - Stolfus	(Costa Rica) Araya - Guevara	(Cuba) Ramírez - Kindelán
Guatemala City Tournament	(Cuba) Ramírez - Kindelán	(Puerto Rico) Otero - Rivera	(United States) Torsone - Thompson
Coors Light Carolina Tournament	(United States) Barron - Szymanski	(Puerto Rico) Otero - Rivera	(Costa Rica) Araya - Guevara

== Medal table by country ==
Medal table as of June 1, 2007.

Position	Country:	Gold:	Silver:	Bronze:	Total:
1.	Puerto Rico	3	2	1	6
2.	USA	3	0	1	4
3.	Cuba	1	1	2	4
4.	Dominican Republic	0	2	0	2
5.	Canada	0	1	2	3
6.	Costa Rica	0	1	1	2
