= Beach volleyball at the 2010 Central American and Caribbean Games =

2010 Beach Volleyball at the Central American and Caribbean Games

Tournament details
- Host country: Puerto Rico
- Dates: July 23–27, 2010
- Teams: 26
- Venue: Cabo Rojo Beach Volleyball Field (in Boquerón, Cabo Rojo host cities)

The Beach volleyball competition at the 2010 Central American and Caribbean Games was held in Cabo Rojo, Puerto Rico.

The tournament was scheduled to be held from 23 to 27 July at the Cabo Rojo Beach Volleyball Field in Porta del Sol.

== Medal summary ==
| Event | Gold | Silver | Bronze |
|---|---|---|---|
| Men | Hernández – Villafañe (VEN) | Miramontes – Virgen (MEX) | Irizarry – Rodríguez (PUR) |
| Women | Candelas – García (MEX) | Acevedo – Santiago (PUR) | Galindo – Galindo (COL) |

== Men's tournament ==
=== Preliminary round ===
==== Group A ====
| Rk | Team | Points | Won | Lost | PW | PL | SW | SL |
|---|---|---|---|---|---|---|---|---|
| 1 | Orlando Irizarry – Roberto Rodríguez (PUR) | 4 | 2 | 0 | 85 | 66 | 4 | 0 |
| 2 | Jeovanny Medrano – David Gabriel Vargaz (SLV) | 3 | 1 | 1 | 80 | 76 | 2 | 2 |
| 3 | Winston Calderon – Danny Lopez (NCA) | 2 | 0 | 2 | 62 | 85 | 0 | 4 |

| 23 July 2010 | Irizarry – Rodríguez (PUR) | 2–0 | Calderon – Lopez (NCA) | Cabo Rojo Beach Volleyball Field |
| 23 July 2010 | (21–14, 21–15) | | | Cabo Rojo Beach Volleyball Field |

| 24 July 2010 | Calderon – Lopez (NCA) | 0–2 | Medrano – Vargaz (SLV) | Cabo Rojo Beach Volleyball Field |
| 24 July 2010 | (20–22, 13–21) | | | Cabo Rojo Beach Volleyball Field |

| 25 July 2010 | Irizarry – Rodríguez (PUR) | 2–0 | Medrano – Vargaz (SLV) | Cabo Rojo Beach Volleyball Field |
| 25 July 2010 | (21–17, 21–20) | | | Cabo Rojo Beach Volleyball Field |

==== Group B ====
| Rk | Team | Points | Won | Lost | PW | PL | SW | SL |
|---|---|---|---|---|---|---|---|---|
| 1 | Igor Hernández – Jesus Villafañe (VEN) | 4 | 2 | 0 | 84 | 56 | 4 | 0 |
| 2 | Jonathan Guevara – Alexander Villegas (CRC) | 3 | 1 | 1 | 68 | 71 | 2 | 2 |
| 3 | Fabien Withfield – Daneil Williams (TRI) | 2 | 0 | 2 | 59 | 84 | 0 | 4 |

| 23 July 2010 | Guevara – Villegas (CRC) | 2–0 | Withfield – Williams (TRI) | Cabo Rojo Beach Volleyball Field |
| 23 July 2010 | (21–16, 21–13) | | | Cabo Rojo Beach Volleyball Field |

| 24 July 2010 | Hernández – Villafañe (VEN) | 2–0 | Withfield – Williams (TRI) | Cabo Rojo Beach Volleyball Field |
| 24 July 2010 | (21–19, 21–11) | | | Cabo Rojo Beach Volleyball Field |

| 25 July 2010 | Hernández – Villafañe (VEN) | 2–0 | Guevara – Villegas (CRC) | Cabo Rojo Beach Volleyball Field |
| 25 July 2010 | (21–13, 21–13) | | | Cabo Rojo Beach Volleyball Field |

==== Group C ====
| Rk | Team | Points | Won | Lost | PW | PL | SW | SL |
|---|---|---|---|---|---|---|---|---|
| 1 | Aldo Miramontes – Juan Virgen (MEX) | 6 | 3 | 0 | 126 | 65 | 6 | 0 |
| 2 | Dany Wilson – Mark Lewis (JAM) | 5 | 2 | 1 | 114 | 94 | 4 | 2 |
| 3 | Shervin Rankin – Onley Thompson (CAY) | 4 | 1 | 2 | 90 | 128 | 2 | 5 |
| 4 | Joseph Clercent – Dayne Williams (LCA) | 3 | 0 | 3 | 89 | 132 | 1 | 6 |

| 23 July 2010 | Wilson – Lewis (JAM) | 2–0 | Rankin – Thompson (CAY) | Cabo Rojo Beach Volleyball Field |
| 23 July 2010 | (21–6, 21–16) | | | Cabo Rojo Beach Volleyball Field |

| 23 July 2010 | Miramontes – Virgen (MEX) | 2–0 | Clercent – Williams (LCA) | Cabo Rojo Beach Volleyball Field |
| 23 July 2010 | (21–10, 21–5) | | | Cabo Rojo Beach Volleyball Field |

| 24 July 2010 | Wilson – Lewis (JAM) | 2–0 | Clercent – Williams (LCA) | Cabo Rojo Beach Volleyball Field |
| 24 July 2010 | (21–19, 21–11) | | | Cabo Rojo Beach Volleyball Field |

| 24 July 2010 | Miramontes – Virgen (MEX) | 2–0 | Rankin – Thompson (CAY) | Cabo Rojo Beach Volleyball Field |
| 24 July 2010 | (21–9, 21–11) | | | Cabo Rojo Beach Volleyball Field |

| 25 July 2010 | Rankin – Thompson (CAY) | 2–1 | Clercent – Williams (LCA) | Cabo Rojo Beach Volleyball Field |
| 25 July 2010 | (12–21, 21–11, 15–13) | | | Cabo Rojo Beach Volleyball Field |

| 25 July 2010 | Miramontes – Virgen (MEX) | 2–0 | Wilson – Lewis (JAM) | Cabo Rojo Beach Volleyball Field |
| 25 July 2010 | (21–14, 21–16) | | | Cabo Rojo Beach Volleyball Field |

==== Group D ====
| Rk | Team | Points | Won | Lost | PW | PL | SW | SL |
|---|---|---|---|---|---|---|---|---|
| 1 | Yewddys Pérez – Germán Recio (DOM) | 6 | 3 | 0 | 126 | 80 | 6 | 0 |
| 2 | Erick Garrido – Julio Recinos (GUA) | 5 | 2 | 1 | 124 | 124 | 4 | 3 |
| 3 | Luis Baide – Manuel Serrano (HON) | 4 | 1 | 2 | 106 | 123 | 2 | 5 |
| 4 | Carl Collins – Kemoroy Percival (SKN) | 3 | 3 | 0 | 114 | 143 | 2 | 6 |

| 23 July 2010 | Pérez – Recio (DOM) | 2–0 | Collins – Percival (SKN) | Cabo Rojo Beach Volleyball Field |
| 23 July 2010 | (21–17, 21–11) | | | Cabo Rojo Beach Volleyball Field |

| 23 July 2010 | Garrido – Recinos (GUA) | 2–0 | Baide – Serrano (HON) | Cabo Rojo Beach Volleyball Field |
| 23 July 2010 | (21–17, 21–18) | | | Cabo Rojo Beach Volleyball Field |

| 24 July 2010 | Pérez – Recio (DOM) | 2–0 | Baide – Serrano (HON) | Cabo Rojo Beach Volleyball Field |
| 24 July 2010 | (21–8, 21–16) | | | Cabo Rojo Beach Volleyball Field |

| 24 July 2010 | Garrido – Recinos (GUA) | 2–1 | Collins – Percival (SKN) | Cabo Rojo Beach Volleyball Field |
| 24 July 2010 | (21–19, 18–21, 21–7) | | | Cabo Rojo Beach Volleyball Field |

| 25 July 2010 | Baide – Serrano (HON) | 2–1 | Collins – Percival (SKN) | Cabo Rojo Beach Volleyball Field |
| 25 July 2010 | (21–12, 11–21, 15–6) | | | Cabo Rojo Beach Volleyball Field |

| 25 July 2010 | Pérez – Recio (DOM) | 2–0 | Garrido – Recinos (GUA) | Cabo Rojo Beach Volleyball Field |
| 25 July 2010 | (21–13, 21–15) | | | Cabo Rojo Beach Volleyball Field |

=== Playoffs ===
==== First round ====
| 26 July 2010 | Irizarry – Rodríguez (PUR) | 2–0 | Guevara – Villegas (CRC) | Cabo Rojo Beach Volleyball Field |
| 26 July 2010 | (21–17, 34–11) | | | Cabo Rojo Beach Volleyball Field |

| 26 July 2010 | Pérez – Recio (DOM) | 2–0 | Wilson – Lewis (JAM) | Cabo Rojo Beach Volleyball Field |
| 26 July 2010 | (21–16, 21–15) | | | Cabo Rojo Beach Volleyball Field |

| 26 July 2010 | Miramontes – Virgen (MEX) | 2–0 | Garrido – Recinos (GUA) | Cabo Rojo Beach Volleyball Field |
| 26 July 2010 | (21–12, 21–8) | | | Cabo Rojo Beach Volleyball Field |

| 26 July 2010 | Hernández – Villafañe (VEN) | 2–0 | Medrano – Vargaz (SLV) | Cabo Rojo Beach Volleyball Field |
| 26 July 2010 | (21–9, 21–14) | | | Cabo Rojo Beach Volleyball Field |

==== Second round ====
| 26 July 2010 | Guevara – Villegas (CRC) | 2–1 | Wilson – Lewis (JAM) | Cabo Rojo Beach Volleyball Field |
| 26 July 2010 | (19–21, 23–21, 15–13) | | | Cabo Rojo Beach Volleyball Field |

| 26 July 2010 | Garrido – Recinos (GUA) | 0–2 | Medrano – Vargaz (SLV) | Cabo Rojo Beach Volleyball Field |
| 26 July 2010 | (19–21, 11–21) | | | Cabo Rojo Beach Volleyball Field |

| 26 July 2010 | Irizarry – Rodríguez (PUR) | 2–0 | Pérez – Recio (DOM) | Cabo Rojo Beach Volleyball Field |
| 26 July 2010 | (21–17, 21–16) | | | Cabo Rojo Beach Volleyball Field |

| 26 July 2010 | Miramontes – Virgen (MEX) | 0–2 | Hernández – Villafañe (VEN) | Cabo Rojo Beach Volleyball Field |
| 26 July 2010 | (19–21, 16–21) | | | Cabo Rojo Beach Volleyball Field |

===== Repechage =====
| 26 July 2010 | Guevara – Villegas (CRC) | 0–2 | Miramontes – Virgen (MEX) | Cabo Rojo Beach Volleyball Field |
| 26 July 2010 | (11–21, 19–21) | | | Cabo Rojo Beach Volleyball Field |

| 26 July 2010 | Medrano – Vargaz (SLV) | 0–2 | Pérez – Recio (DOM) | Cabo Rojo Beach Volleyball Field |
| 26 July 2010 | (19–21, 18–21) | | | Cabo Rojo Beach Volleyball Field |

==== Semifinals ====
| 27 July 2010 | Irizarry – Rodríguez (PUR) | 0–2 | Miramontes – Virgen (MEX) | Cabo Rojo Beach Volleyball Field |
| 27 July 2010 | (10–21, 12–21) | | | Cabo Rojo Beach Volleyball Field |

| 27 July 2010 | Hernández – Villafañe (VEN) | 2–0 | Pérez – Recio (DOM) | Cabo Rojo Beach Volleyball Field |
| 27 July 2010 | (21–13, 21–17) | | | Cabo Rojo Beach Volleyball Field |

==== Finals ====
===== Bronze-medal match =====
| 27 July 2010 | Irizarry – Rodríguez (PUR) | 2–0 | Pérez – Recio (DOM) | Cabo Rojo Beach Volleyball Field |
| 27 July 2010 | (21–19, 21–16) | | | Cabo Rojo Beach Volleyball Field |

===== Gold-medal match =====
| 27 July 2010 | Miramontes – Virgen (MEX) | 0–2 | Hernández – Villafañe (VEN) | Cabo Rojo Beach Volleyball Field |
| 27 July 2010 | (18–21, 15–21) | | | Cabo Rojo Beach Volleyball Field |

== Women's tournament ==
=== Preliminary round ===
==== Group A ====
| Rk | Team | Points | Won | Lost | PW | PL | SW | SL |
|---|---|---|---|---|---|---|---|---|
| 1 | Bibiana Candelas – Mayra García (MEX) | 4 | 2 | 0 | 84 | 40 | 4 | 0 |
| 2 | Gina Del Rosario – Ingrid Carmona (DOM) | 3 | 1 | 1 | 65 | 65 | 2 | 2 |
| 3 | Tramaine Edward – Dania Hamilton (LCA) | 2 | 0 | 2 | 40 | 84 | 0 | 4 |

| 23 July 2010 | Candelas – García (MEX) | 2–0 | Edward – Hamilton (LCA) | Cabo Rojo Beach Volleyball Field |
| 23 July 2010 | (21–8, 21–9) | | | Cabo Rojo Beach Volleyball Field |

| 24 July 2010 | Del Rosario – Carmona (DOM) | 2–0 | Edward – Hamilton (LCA) | Cabo Rojo Beach Volleyball Field |
| 24 July 2010 | (21–12, 21–11) | | | Cabo Rojo Beach Volleyball Field |

| 25 July 2010 | Candelas – García (MEX) | 2–0 | Del Rosario – Carmona (DOM) | Cabo Rojo Beach Volleyball Field |
| 25 July 2010 | (21–9, 21–14) | | | Cabo Rojo Beach Volleyball Field |

==== Group B ====
| Rk | Team | Points | Won | Lost | PW | PL | SW | SL |
|---|---|---|---|---|---|---|---|---|
| 1 | Andrea Galindo – Claudia Galindo (COL) | 4 | 2 | 0 | 84 | 35 | 4 | 0 |
| 2 | Ayana Dyette – Nadiege Honore (TRI) | 3 | 1 | 1 | 77 | 94 | 2 | 3 |
| 3 | Cheryl Daley – Cherine Richards (JAM) | 2 | 0 | 2 | 66 | 98 | 0 | 4 |

| 23 July 2010 | Dyette – Honore (TRI) | 2–1 | Daley – Richards (JAM) | Cabo Rojo Beach Volleyball Field |
| 23 July 2010 | (19–21, 22–20, 15–11) | | | Cabo Rojo Beach Volleyball Field |

| 24 July 2010 | Galindo – Galindo (COL) | 2–0 | Daley – Richards (JAM) | Cabo Rojo Beach Volleyball Field |
| 24 July 2010 | (21–4, 21–10) | | | Cabo Rojo Beach Volleyball Field |

| 25 July 2010 | Galindo – Galindo (COL) | 2–0 | Dyette – Honore (TRI) | Cabo Rojo Beach Volleyball Field |
| 25 July 2010 | (21–12, 21–9) | | | Cabo Rojo Beach Volleyball Field |

==== Group C ====
| Rk | Team | Points | Won | Lost | PW | PL | SW | SL |
|---|---|---|---|---|---|---|---|---|
| 1 | Dariam Acevedo – Yarleen Santiago (PUR) | 4 | 2 | 0 | 84 | 39 | 4 | 0 |
| 2 | Laura Molina – Ivonne Soler (SLV) | 3 | 1 | 1 | 67 | 71 | 2 | 3 |
| 3 | Elisa Torres – Jackeline Toruño (NCA) | 2 | 0 | 2 | 43 | 84 | 0 | 4 |

| 23 July 2010 | Acevedo – Santiago (PUR) | 2–0 | Molina – Soler (SLV) | Cabo Rojo Beach Volleyball Field |
| 23 July 2010 | (21–8, 21–6) | | | Cabo Rojo Beach Volleyball Field |

| 24 July 2010 | Molina – Soler (SLV) | 2–0 | Torres – Toruño (NCA) | Cabo Rojo Beach Volleyball Field |
| 24 July 2010 | (21–10, 21–19) | | | Cabo Rojo Beach Volleyball Field |

| 25 July 2010 | Acevedo – Santiago (PUR) | 2–0 | Molina – Soler (SLV) | Cabo Rojo Beach Volleyball Field |
| 25 July 2010 | (21–13, 21–12) | | | Cabo Rojo Beach Volleyball Field |

==== Group D ====
| Rk | Team | Points | Won | Lost | PW | PL | SW | SL |
|---|---|---|---|---|---|---|---|---|
| 1 | Nathalia Alfaro – Ingrid Morales (CRC) | 6 | 3 | 0 | 126 | 71 | 6 | 0 |
| 2 | Maria Jose Orellana – Anna Lourdes Ramirez (GUA) | 5 | 2 | 1 | 114 | 90 | 4 | 2 |
| 3 | Brenda Allen – Shanicia Dyer (SKN) | 4 | 1 | 2 | 80 | 119 | 2 | 4 |
| 4 | Mona Crawford – Anthazia Mason (BAR) | 3 | 0 | 3 | 86 | 126 | 0 | 6 |

| 23 July 2010 | Alfaro – Morales (CRC) | 2–0 | Crawford – Mason (BAR) | Cabo Rojo Beach Volleyball Field |
| 23 July 2010 | (21–9, 21–16) | | | Cabo Rojo Beach Volleyball Field |

| 23 July 2010 | Orellana – Ramirez (GUA) | 2–0 | Allen – Dyer (SKN) | Cabo Rojo Beach Volleyball Field |
| 23 July 2010 | (21–10, 21–12) | | | Cabo Rojo Beach Volleyball Field |

| 24 July 2010 | Orellana – Ramirez (GUA) | 2–0 | Crawford – Mason (BAR) | Cabo Rojo Beach Volleyball Field |
| 24 July 2010 | (21–16, 21–10) | | | Cabo Rojo Beach Volleyball Field |

| 24 July 2010 | Alfaro – Morales (CRC) | 2–0 | Allen – Dyer (SKN) | Cabo Rojo Beach Volleyball Field |
| 24 July 2010 | (21–6, 21–10) | | | Cabo Rojo Beach Volleyball Field |

| 25 July 2010 | Allen – Dyer (SKN) | 2–0 | Crawford – Mason (BAR) | Cabo Rojo Beach Volleyball Field |
| 25 July 2010 | (21–19, 21–16) | | | Cabo Rojo Beach Volleyball Field |

| 25 July 2010 | Alfaro – Morales (CRC) | 2–0 | Orellana – Ramirez (GUA) | Cabo Rojo Beach Volleyball Field |
| 25 July 2010 | (21–17, 21–13) | | | Cabo Rojo Beach Volleyball Field |

=== Playoffs ===
==== Quarterfinals ====
| 26 July 2010 | Candelas – García (MEX) | 2–0 | Dyette – Honore (TRI) | Cabo Rojo Beach Volleyball Field |
| 26 July 2010 | (21–8, 21–10) | | | Cabo Rojo Beach Volleyball Field |

| 26 July 2010 | Laura Molina – Ivonne Soler (SLV) | 0–2 | Alfaro – Morales (CRC) | Cabo Rojo Beach Volleyball Field |
| 26 July 2010 | (10–21, 11–21) | | | Cabo Rojo Beach Volleyball Field |

| 26 July 2010 | Acevedo – Santiago (PUR) | 2–0 | Orellana – Ramirez (GUA) | Cabo Rojo Beach Volleyball Field |
| 26 July 2010 | (21–10, 21–16) | | | Cabo Rojo Beach Volleyball Field |

| 26 July 2010 | Galindo – Galindo (COL) | 2–0 | Del Rosario – Carmona (DOM) | Cabo Rojo Beach Volleyball Field |
| 26 July 2010 | (22–20, 21–17) | | | Cabo Rojo Beach Volleyball Field |

==== Semifinals ====
| 27 July 2010 | Candelas – García (MEX) | 2–0 | Galindo – Galindo (COL) | Cabo Rojo Beach Volleyball Field |
| 27 July 2010 | (21–14, 21–14) | | | Cabo Rojo Beach Volleyball Field |

| 27 July 2010 | Acevedo – Santiago (PUR) | 2–0 | Alfaro – Morales (CRC) | Cabo Rojo Beach Volleyball Field |
| 27 July 2010 | (21–16, 21–17) | | | Cabo Rojo Beach Volleyball Field |

==== Finals ====
===== Bronze-medal match =====
| 27 July 2010 | Galindo – Galindo (COL) | 2–0 | Alfaro – Morales (CRC) | Cabo Rojo Beach Volleyball Field |
| 27 July 2010 | (21–11, 21–18) | | | Cabo Rojo Beach Volleyball Field |

===== Gold-medal match =====
| 27 July 2010 | Candelas – García (MEX) | 2–0 | Acevedo – Santiago (PUR) | Cabo Rojo Beach Volleyball Field |
| 27 July 2010 | (21–19, 28–26) | | | Cabo Rojo Beach Volleyball Field |
