= Dominican Republic National Beach Volleyball Tour =

The Dominican Republic National Beach Volleyball Tour is a volleyball tournament based in Dominican Republic. This tournament is organized by the Dominican Republic Volleyball Federation.

Included players, but not limited to:

Bethania Almánzar

Ezequiel Castillo

Ginnette Del Rosario

Niurka Toribio https://lcwarriors.com/sports/womens-volleyball/roster/niurka-toribio/2266, and more.

Beach volleyball is an enduring sport. One that requires a person to have the skill set of passing, setting, hitting, good defense and offense. Beach volleyball is different than indoor. Indoor you have six players and outdoor it is just you and your partner. Beach volleyball is the sport to play that will help you grow as a stronger athlete.
