= Ezequiel Castillo =

Ezequiel Castillo may refer to:

- Ezequiel Castillo (footballer) (born 1967), Argentine retired footballer
- Ezequiel Castillo (beach volleyball), beach volleyball player from Dominican Republic
