= Beach volleyball at the 2006 Central American and Caribbean Games =

2006 Beach Volleyball at the Central American and Caribbean Games
Tournament details
- Host country: Colombia
- Dates: July 16–29, 2006
- Teams: 26
- Venue: Playa Boca Grande (in Cartagena host cities)

The Beach Volleyball at the 2006 Central American and Caribbean Games was held July 16–29, 2006 in Cartagena, Colombia.

== Women's competition ==
RANK	TEAM
	Dalixia Fernández - Tamara Larrea (CUB)
	Vanessa Virgen - Martha Revuelta (MEX)
	Frankelina Rodríguez - Alejandra García (VEN)
4.	Yamileska Yantín - Lyan Puig (PUR)
5.	Andrea Galindo - Rosa Galindo (COL)
6.	Margarita Suero - Rosa Medrano (DOM)
7.	María Orellana - Anna Ramírez (GUA)
8.	Nathalia Alfaro - Yanina Aguilar (CRC)
9.	Indira Inestroza - Sonia Pino (HON)
10.	Nancy Joseph - Andrea Davis (TTO)
11.	Laura Molina - Diana Romero (ESA)
12.	Shirnel Mcpherson - Mona Crawford (BAR)
13.	Kathleen Hosie - Karina Wesselhoft (BVI)

== Men's competition ==
RANK	TEAM
	Francisco Álvarez - Wilfredo Villar (CUB)
	Jackson Henríquez - Igor Hernández (VEN)
	Ulises Ontiveros - Lombardo Ontiveros (MEX)
4.	Raúl Papaleo - Joseph Gil (PUR)
5.	Marcelo Araya - Jonathan Guevara (CRC)
6.	Wilfredo Barrios - Herney Saldarriaga (COL)
7.	Jeovanny Medrano - Carlos Leiva (ESA)
8.	Yewddys Pérez - Francisco Abreu (DOM)
9.	Winston Gittens - Sean Codrington (BAR)
10.	Kevin Edwards - David Thomas (TTO)
11.	Shawn Seabrookes - St. Clair Hodges (SKN)
12.	Terry Stevens - Zach Caiger-Greaves (ISV)
13.	Jorge Bolaños - Hugo García (GUA)
