= Sergio González (beach volleyball) =

Cuban beach volleyball player

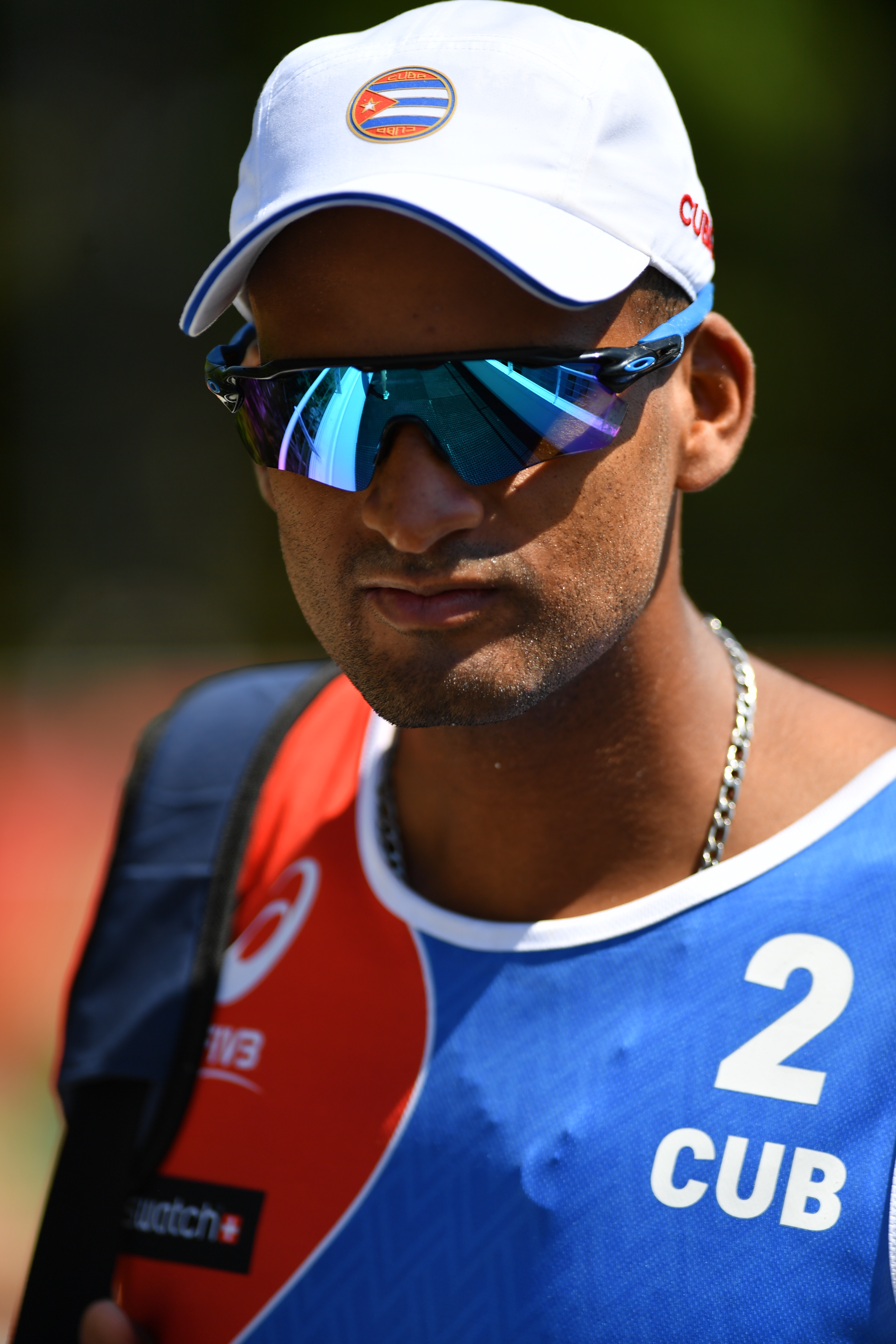
- González at the 2017 Beach Volleyball World Championships

Personal information
- Full name: Sergio Reynaldo González Bayard
- Born: June 10, 1990 (age 36); Holguín, Cuba
- Hometown: Holguín, Cuba
- Height: 192 cm (6 ft 4 in)

Beach volleyball information

Current teammate
Years	Teammate
2009-2014; 2015-present	Karell Peña; Nivaldo Díaz
Honours
Men's beach volleyball
Representing Cuba
NORCECA Beach Volleyball Circuit
Gold medal – first place	2009 Boca Chica	Beach
Silver medal – second place	2009 Cayman Islands	Beach
Silver medal – second place	2009 Guatemala	Beach

Sergio Reynaldo González Bayard (Note: In this Spanish name, the first or paternal surname is González and the second or maternal family name is Bayard.) (born June 10, 1990, in Holguín, Holguín Province) is a beach volleyball player from Cuba, who won the golden medal in the men's competition at the NORCECA Beach Volleyball Circuit 2009 in Boca Chica and silver in Guatemala, and Cayman Islands partnering Karell Peña.

Playing with Yaismel Borrel, they finished 9th at FIVB Youth at The Hague, Netherlands.

== Awards ==
=== National team ===
- NORCECA Beach Volleyball Circuit Boca Chica 2009 Gold Medal
- NORCECA Beach Volleyball Circuit Guatemala 2009 Silver Medal
- NORCECA Beach Volleyball Circuit Cayman Islands 2009 Silver Medal
