= Marie Lessard =

Marie Lessard may refer to:

- Marie-Andrée Lessard (born 1977), Canadian beach volleyball player
- Marie-Evelyne Lessard, Canadian actress
