= 2006 NORCECA Men's Beach Volleyball Continental Championship =

Volleyball competition held in Dominican Republic

2006 NORCECA Men’s Continental Beach Volleyball Tournament
Tournament details
- Host country: Dominican Republic
- Dates: April 14–16, 2006
- Teams: 8
- Venue: Boca Chica Beach (in Santo Domingo host cities)

The 2006 NORCECA Men's Continental Beach Volleyball Tournament was held from April 14 to 16 2006 in Boca Chica, Dominican Republic.

== Final ranking ==
- A total number of 8 participating couples

Place	Team	Earnings	Points
1st place, gold medalist(s)	Strickland - Roberts (USA)	US$4,000.00	
2nd place, silver medalist(s)	Papaleo - Gil (PUR)	US$3,000.00	
3rd place, bronze medalist(s)	G. Villegas - A. Villegas (CRC)	US$2,000.00	
4.	Pozo - Abreu (DOM)		
5.	Medrano - Leiva (ESA)		
.	Pérez - Vargas (DOM)		
.	Hodge - Soriano (DOM)		
.	Castillo - De Jesús (DOM)		

== See also ==
- NORCECA Beach Volleyball Circuit
