= Karell Peña =

Cuban beach volleyball player

Personal information
- Full name: Karell Peña Ventoza
- Born: January 1, 1988 (age 38); Ciego de Ávila, Cuba
- Hometown: Ciego de Ávila, Cuba
- Height: 6 ft 2 in (188 cm)

Beach volleyball information

Current teammate
Years	Teammate
2009	Sergio González
Honours
Men's beach volleyball
Representing Cuba
NORCECA Beach Volleyball Circuit
Gold medal – first place	Boca Chica 2009	Beach
Silver medal – second place	Cayman Islands 2009	Beach
Silver medal – second place	Guatemala 2009	Beach

Karell Peña Ventoza (born January 1, 1989, in Ciego de Ávila) is a male beach volleyball player from Cuba who twice won the silver medal in the men's competition at the NORCECA Beach Volleyball Circuit 2009 in the Cayman Islands) and Guatemala, partnering with Sergio González.

Playing with Alex Ruiz, he finished 4th at the II ALBA games. With Javier Jimenez, he won the silver medal at the Cuban National Games in 2008.

== Awards ==
=== National team ===
- NORCECA Beach Volleyball Circuit Boca Chica 2009 Gold Medal
- NORCECA Beach Volleyball Circuit Guatemala 2009 Silver Medal
- NORCECA Beach Volleyball Circuit Cayman Islands 2009 Silver Medal
- IV Olimpiada Nacional del Deporte Cubano Silver Medal
