= Rosa Medrano =

Dominican volleyball and beach volleyball player

Personal information
- Nationality: Dominican Republic
- Born: April 16, 1985 (age 41); San Cristóbal, Dominican Republic
- Hometown: Santo Domingo

Volleyball information
- Position: Outside hitter / Middle Blocker
- Current team: (United States) Missouri Tigers
- Number: 7

National team
Dominican Republic

Rosa Medrano (born April 16, 1985, in San Cristóbal) is a female volleyball and beach volleyball player from the Dominican Republic, who won the silver medal with her native country at the 2002 NORCECA Girls Youth Continental Championship U-18.

In beach volleyball she won the silver medal at the 2006 National Championship partnering with Margarita Suero and later that year represented her home country at the 2006 Central American and Caribbean Games with the same partner and finished in 6th place.
Playing with Laritza Díaz, she won the silver medal at the Torneo de Voleibol Playero de Hato Mayor 2007, a local beach volleyball tournament on Dominican soil.

== Miami Dade ==
=== 2007 ===
She joined Miami Dade College for the 2007 season, her junior college won the Pasco-Hernando Invitational, and she was chosen tournament MVP. Her team ended up as NJCAA National Champion Runner-up, with a 33–1 record. That year she was chosen NJCAA 2007 Division I All-Region First Team, and 2007 AVCA Two-Year Colleges Second-Team All-America, among other individual awards.

=== 2008 ===
She led Miami Dade College Lady Sharks to the 2008 NJCAA championship tournament with a 26–8 overall record, the team finished in the 6th place. Miami Dade won the Southern Conference and was also State Champion that season. She was chosen for the All Tournament Team. She won NJCAA 2008 Division I First-Team All-America, NJCAA 2008 Division I All-Region First Team, 2008 AVCA Two-Year Colleges First-Team All-America and some more.

== University of Missouri ==
After completing the two-years program at MDC, in 2009 Rosa joined the Tigers of the University of Missouri. Rapidly she became MVP at the Tiger Invitational.

== Clubs ==
- (Dominican Republic) Cajuquis (2002)
- (Dominican Republic) Los Prados (2003–2004)
- (Dominican Republic) Liga Juan Guzman (2005)
- (Dominican Republic) Villa Verde (2006)
- (Dominican Republic) Modeca (2006)
- (Dominican Republic) Bameso (2006)
- (Dominican Republic) La Romana (2008)

== Colleges ==
- (United States) Miami Dade College (2007–2008)
- (United States) University of Missouri (2009–2010)

== Awards ==
=== Miami Dade College ===
==== Individuals ====
- 2008 AVCA Two-Year Colleges First-Team "All-American"
- 2008 All-State/All-Region Team
- 2008 FCCAA Tournament "Most valuable player"
- 2008 NJCAA Championships "All-Tournament Team"
- 2008 FCCAA Championships "All-Tournament Team"
- 2008 Southern Conference "Player of the Year"
- 2008 Southern Conference First-Team
- 2008 Jefferson College Halloween Invitational Tournament "All-Tournament First-Team"
- NJCAA "Player of the Week: 10/29/08"
- FCCAA "Player of the Week: 9/19/08"
- 2007 NJCAA Championships "All-Tournament Team"
- 2007 FCCAA "All-Academic Team"
- 2007 FCCAA "All State/All Tournament Team"
- 2007 Southern Conference "First-Team"
- 2007 AVCA Two-Year Colleges "Second Team All-American"
- 2007 Pasco-Hernando Invitational "Most valuable player"

==== Team ====
- 2008 Southern Conference Championships Champion
- 2008 FCCAA Championships Champion
- 2008 Atlantic District Champions Champion
- 2007 NJCAA Championships Runner-Up
- 2007 Southern Conference Championships Champion
- 2007 Atlantic District Champions Champion
- 2007 FCCAA Championships Champion

=== National team ===
- 2004 NORCECA Women´s Junior Continental Championship U-20 Silver Medal
- 2002 NORCECA Girls Youth Continental Championship U-18 Silver Medal

=== Beach Volleyball ===
- 2007 Torneo de Voleibol Playero de Hato Mayor Silver Medal
- 2006 National Beach Volleyball Championship Silver Medal

=== Clubs ===
- Dominican Republic La Romana Superior Tournament 2006 — Champion, with Villa Verde
- Dominican Republic Distrito Nacional Superior Tournament 2006 — Runner-Up, with Bameso
- Dominican Republic Distrito Nacional Superior Tournament 2005 — Runner-Up, with Liga Juan Guzman
