= Dominican Republic Volleyball Federation =

Governing body of volleyball in the Dominican Republic

Dominican Republic Volleyball Federation Federación Dominicana de Voleibol
- Formation: 1955
- Type: National Federation
- Headquarters: Santo Domingo
- Location: Santo Domingo
- Members: FIVB; NORCECA; COLIMDO; MIDEREC
- Official language: Spanish
- President: Lic. Ramón Alexis García
- Key people: Lic. Cristóbal Marte Hoffiz; Vice-President
- Website: fedovoli.org

The Dominican Republic Volleyball Federation (Spanish: Federación Dominicana de Voleibol or FEDOVOLI) is a non-profit organization which serves as the national governing body of volleyball in the Dominican Republic.

The National Federation is recognized by the Fédération Internationale de Volleyball (FIVB) and the Dominican Republic Olympic Committee (Comité Olímpico Dominicano or COLIMDO).

== Tournaments ==
- Dominican Republic Volleyball League
- Dominican Republic National Beach Volleyball Tour
- Superior National Tournament
- Minivoli National Tournament

== Affiliated associations ==
- Distrito Nacional Volleyball Association
- Santo Domingo Volleyball Association
- Santiago Volleyball Association
- La Romana Volleyball Association
