= Jason Wight =

American beach volleyball player

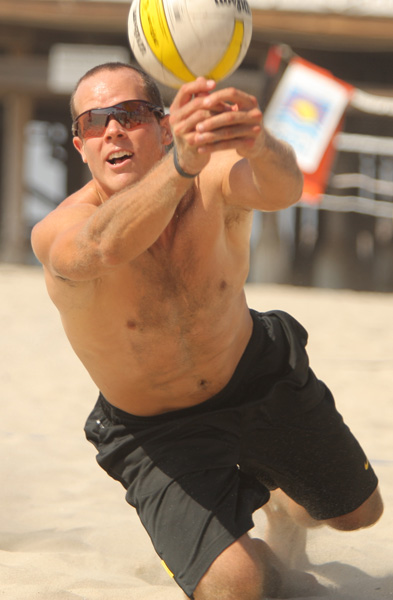

Personal information
- Nationality: United States
- Born: July 21, 1979 (age 47); West Springfield, Virginia, U.S.
- Hometown: San Diego, California, U.S.
- Height: 6 ft 0 in (1.83 m)

Beach volleyball information

Current teammate
Years	Teammate
2009	Michael Brüning
Medal record
Men's beach volleyball
Representing the United States
NORCECA Beach Volleyball Circuit
Gold medal – first place	2009 Cayman Islands	Beach
Silver medal – second place	2009 Boca Chica	Beach

Jason Wight (born July 21, 1979 in West Springfield, Virginia) is a male beach volleyball player from the United States who won the gold medal at the NORCECA Circuit 2009 at Cayman Islands playing with Michael Brüning.

He also won the AVP Young Guns 2009 Muskegon tournament playing with Ivan Mercer.

== Awards ==
=== National team ===
- NORCECA Beach Volleyball Circuit Cayman Islands 2009 Gold Medal
- NORCECA Beach Volleyball Circuit Boca Chica 2009 Silver Medal

=== AVP Pro Tour ===
- AVP Pro Tour Young Guns Muskegon 2009 Gold Medal
