= Annie Martin (beach volleyball) =

Canadian beach volleyball player (b. 1981)

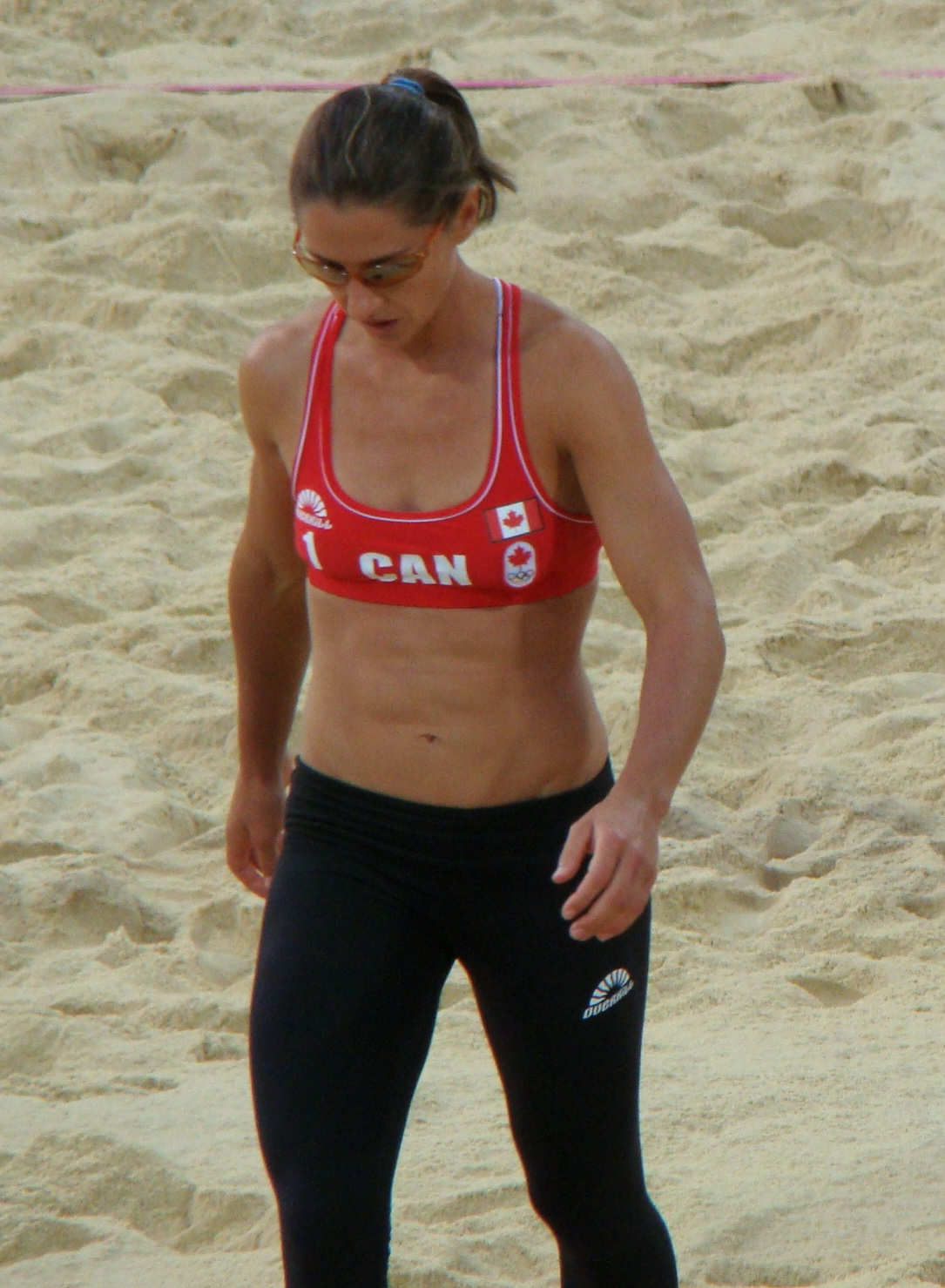
- Martin at the 2012 Summer Olympics

Personal information
- Nationality: Canada
- Born: 7 September 1981 (age 45) Lachine, Quebec, Canada
- Home town: Sherbrooke, Quebec, Canada
- Education: Université de Sherbrooke
- Height: 170 cm (5 ft 7 in)
- Weight: 61 kg (134 lb)
Beach volleyball information
Current teammate
Years	Teammate	Tours (points)
2009	Marie-Andrée Lessard	–
Previous teammates
Years	Teammate	Tours (points)
2007	Dana Cooke	135
Honours
Women's beach volleyball
Representing Canada
NORCECA Beach Volleyball Circuit
Silver medal – second place	Boca Chica 2007	Beach

Annie Martin (born 7 September 1981) is a Canadian beach volleyball player. She has represented her country at the 2004 and 2012 Summer Olympics. Her current playing partner is Marie-Andrée Lessard.

== University career ==
Martin played university volleyball for the Sherbrooke Vert et Or for five seasons from 2000 to 2005. She won RSEQ conference championships with the Vert et Or in 2002 and 2005 and won national championships with the team in 2003 and 2005.

== Career ==
Martin was inspired to compete in beach volleyball after seeing Mark Heese and John Child compete for Canada at the 1996 Summer Olympics. She has won five Canadian titles, in 2002, 2003, 2004, 2006 and in 2009.

Martin and her partner, Guylaine Dumont, tied for fifth in the women's beach volleyball event at the 2004 Summer Olympics, after losing to the American pair of Kerri Walsh and Misty May in the quarterfinals.

Martin qualified once more for the Olympics at the 2012 Summer Games, teaming with Marie-Andrée Lessard, after the pair defeated Liz Maloney and Heather Bansley in a match to decide the Canadian representatives. Martin and Lessard had previously won the Canadian team a place at the women's beach volleyball tournament by winning the Continental Cup Games qualifying tournament. Prior to the 2012 Games, Martin was the only active Canadian beach volleyball athlete who had competed in a previous Olympics. Ahead of the tournament, the duo felt positive about the teams they had been drawn against in the preliminary group stage. Martin and Lessard lost their first match against the British team of Zara Dampney and Shauna Mullin after winning the first set 21–14, but then lost the second 21–14 and the third by 15–13. The Canadian duo lost their second match by a similar scoreline, 2–1 in sets, against the Russian team of Ekaterina Khomyakova and Evgenia Ukolova.

== Honours ==
In 2012, Martin was awarded the Queen Elizabeth II Diamond Jubilee Medal.

== Personal life ==
Annie Martin was born in Lachine, Quebec, and is married to Vincent Larivee. She was educated at the Université de Sherbrooke.
