= Yanina Aguilar =

Costa Rican beach volleyball player (born 1977)

Yanina Aguilar (born February 15, 1977) is a beach volleyball player from Costa Rica, who played at the 2006 Central American and Caribbean Games playing with Nathalia Alfaro finishing 8th.

At her home country, she won five beach volleyball Championships, between 1995 and 2004.

She played Indoor Volleyball with her National Team at the 2006 Pan American Cup.
