= Roberto de Jesús (volleyball) =

Dominican Republic beach volleyball player

Personal information
- Nationality: Dominican Republic
- Born: Dominican Republic

Beach volleyball information

Current teammate
Teammate
Yhonastan Fabian

Roberto de Jesús is a male beach volleyball player from Dominican Republic, who participated the 2006 NORCECA Men’s Beach Volleyball Continental Championship with Ezequiel Castillo.

He also competed at the 2008 NORCECA Beach Volleyball Circuit with Charlin Vargas.

At the Dominican Beach Tour 2008, he won a gold medal, playing with Yhonastan Fabian.

He also earned a third place with Sánchez Ramírez at the Dominican Republic Volleyball League playing indoor volleyball.

== Clubs ==
- (Dominican Republic) Sánchez Ramírez (2008)
