= Parque Nacional Submarino La Caleta =

National park in the Dominican Republic

La Caleta Underwater National Park
- Parque Nacional Submarino La Caleta
- IUCN category II (national park)
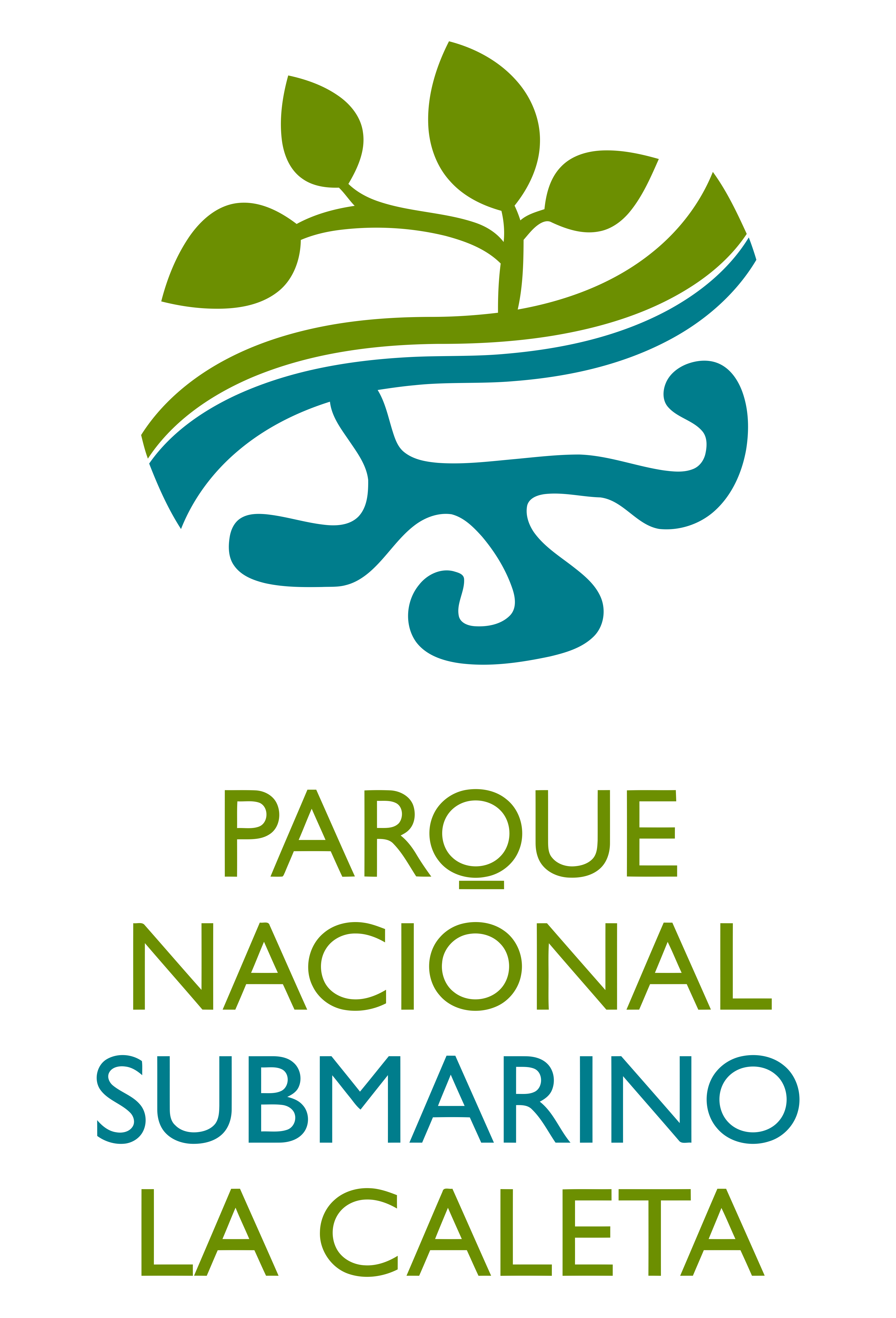

- Location within the Dominican Republic
- Interactive map of La Caleta Underwater National Park
- Location: Santo Domingo Province, Dominican Republic
- Nearest city: Santo Domingo
- Coordinates: 18°26′58″N 69°41′07″W
- Area: 12 km^{2} (4.6 sq mi)
- Established: September 25, 1986
- Governing body: Reef Check Dominican Republic (RCDR)
- Website: www.parquemarinolacaleta.org

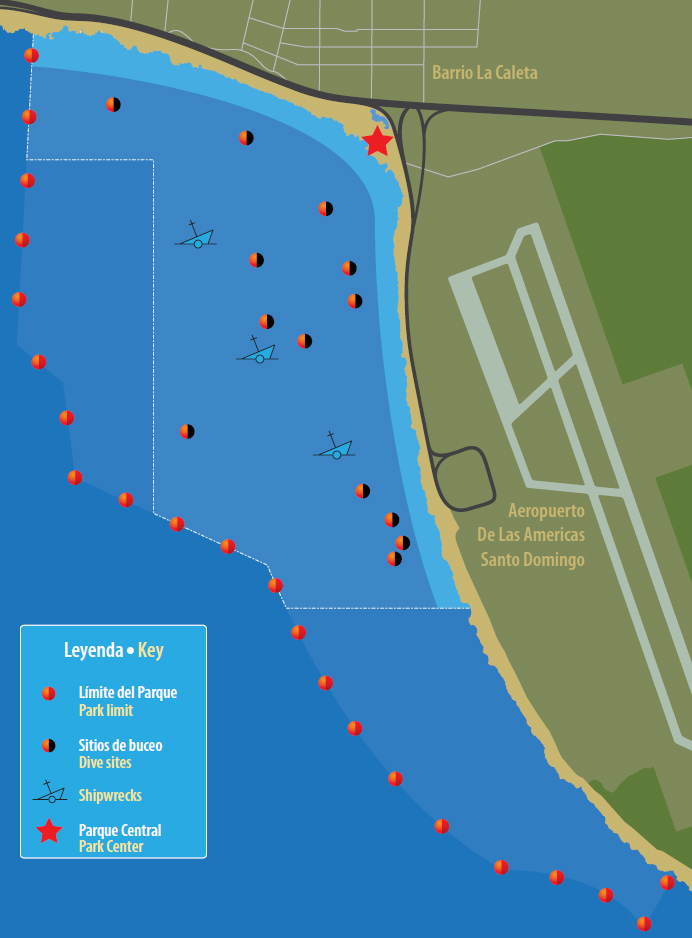
Map of the Parque Nacional Submarino La Caleta, indicating the park's boundaries and the locations of diving sites.

The Parque Nacional Submarino La Caleta (English: La Caleta Underwater National Park) is a national park located approximately 20 kilometres (12 mi) from Santo Domingo, the capital of the Dominican Republic. It is adjacent to Las Americas International Airport.

Created by Decree No. 249 on September 25, 1986, La Caleta Underwater National Park is the first underwater park in the Dominican Republic and is considered by experts to be one of the five best diving locations in the Caribbean.

It has a maximum depth of 180 metres (590 ft). Many coral reefs can be found between 10 metres (33 ft) and 50 metres (160 ft). It is one of the most visited parks in the country and attracts divers from both the Dominican Republic and other countries.

It is classified as an ecotourism park, aimed at the assessment of existing natural resources, while encouraging participants to pursue conservation and respect for nature.

The main tourist attraction is the ship Hickory, which was removed in 1984 by Grayson Roach in order to form a habitat for reef fish and a diving destination. Inside the park there is an Ethnological and Archaeological Museum which has a large collection of objects created by the Taíno.

== History ==
At the time of the arrival of conquistadors in 1492, La Caleta was a major Indian settlement. The settlement, known as Herds led Toto, included La Caleta and its surrounding area. According to tradition, it was inhabited by native people who were engaged in fishing and agriculture.

In 1972, families living around the "little beach" were evicted to start the excavation and construction of the Pantheon Archaeological Museum as well as the national park.

== Museum-Pantheon and archaeological site ==
In 1972, the La Caleta Centre was established by the scientific community when archaeologists discovered 373 skeletons of indigenous pre-Columbian people who had inhabited the island of Santo Domingo.

The finding was of great importance because the remains were associated with three cultural components that had inhabited the island: Ostionoid, Late Taíno, Late Elenoide. The bones dated from AD 650, 750 and 840. The archaeologists found a second burial mound formed by a child's bones that gave the impression of the child being tied up. These deaths may have been the result of an epidemic.

Archaeologists Morban Laucer Fernando, Luis Chanlatte Baik, and Manuel Garcia Arevalo excavated the site over a period of two years, under the auspices of the Dominican Republic government, along with the participation of researchers from the United States and Puerto Rico.

Since the inception of La Caleta, both researchers and the government considered creating an archaeological museum for tourists, students and researchers dedicated to the understanding and study of the burial customs of the indigenous people. Eventually, in 1974, the Constitutional Government of President Dr. Joaquín Balaguer opened the La Caleta Centre and the Archaeological Museum.

== Management ==
La Caleta Park, the only Marine National Park in the Dominican Republic, exists as a national model for community-based coastal marine management. In recognition of its success, the government recently awarded co-management of the La Caleta Park to Reef Check Dominican Republic (RCDR) and its local partners. This empowering of local communities represents a new model for Dominican Republic citizens to sustainably manage and benefit from their coastal ecosystems. The goal is for this model to expand to include networks of community-run marine protected areas, where local priorities are aligned with conservation goals.
