= Michael Brüning =

American beach volleyball player

Mike Brüning
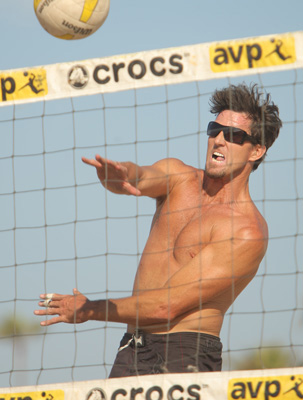
- Brüning in 2009

Personal information
- Full name: Michael Brüning
- Nationality: United States
- Born: November 11, 1969 (age 56); Tucson, Arizona, U.S.
- Hometown: San Diego, California, U.S.
- Height: 6 ft 4 in (192 cm)
- Weight: 238 lb (108 kg)

Beach volleyball information

Current teammate
Years	Teammate
2009	Jason Wight
Medal record
Men's beach volleyball
Representing the United States
NORCECA Beach Volleyball Circuit
Gold medal – first place	2009 Cayman Islands	Beach
Silver medal – second place	2009 Boca Chica	Beach

Michael Brüning (born November 11, 1969) is a male beach volleyball player from the United States who won the gold medal at the NORCECA Circuit 2009 at Cayman Islands playing with Jason Wight.

Michael was born in Tucson, Arizona. He is legally deaf, and he had participated in four Deaflympics Games. In the 1993 edition, his team won the silver medal indoors and in 2005, he won the silver medal in beach volleyball, playing with Scott Majorino.

== Awards ==
=== National team ===
- NORCECA Beach Volleyball Circuit Cayman Islands 2009 Gold Medal
- NORCECA Beach Volleyball Circuit Boca Chica 2009 Silver Medal

=== Deaflympics Games ===
- XVII Edition at Sofia, Bulgaria (1993) – Indoor Volleyball – Silver Medal
- XX Edition at Melbourne, Australia (2005) – Beach Volleyball – Silver Medal
- XXI Edition at Taipei, Taiwan (2009) – Beach Volleyball – Silver Medal
