= La Caleta, Dominican Republic =

La Caleta
- Municipality
- La Caleta
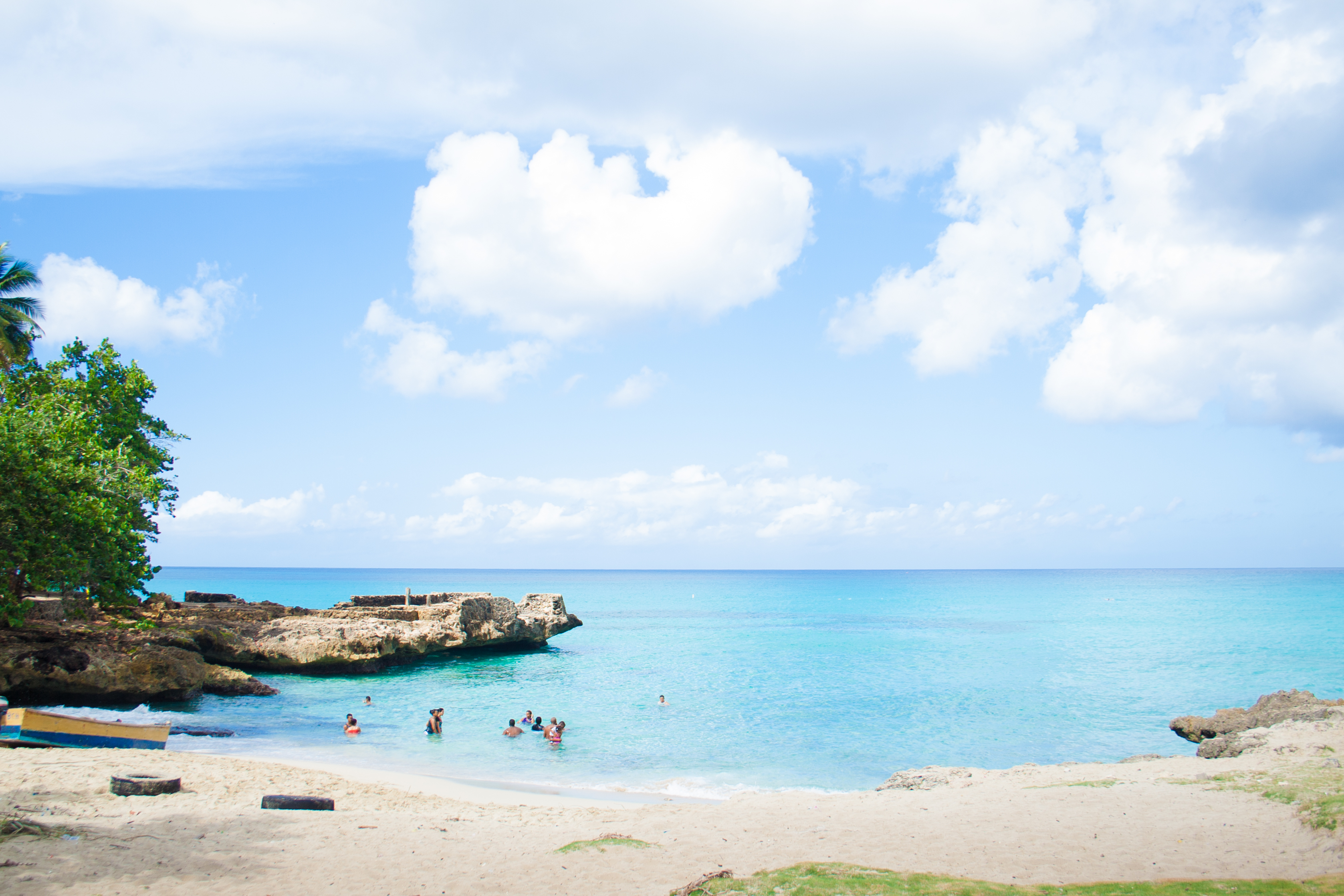
- La Caleta beach located in La Caleta Underwater National Park

- Location within the Dominican Republic
- Coordinates: 18°27′50″N 69°40′50″W
- Country: Dominican Republic
- Province: Santo Domingo
- Municipal district: 24 February 2004
- Municipality: 9 August 2024

Government
  - District director: Máximo Soriano de los Santos (Modern Revolutionary Party)

Area
  - Total: 34.3 km^{2} (13.2 sq mi)

Population (2022)
  - Total: 84,310
  - Density: 2,460/km^{2} (6,370/sq mi)

La Caleta (Spanish pronunciation: [la kaˈleta]) is a municipality located in the Santo Domingo Province of the Dominican Republic. La Caleta obtained its name from its origins as a small cove. It was elevated to municipal district status by Law 107-04, dated 24 February 2004, when it was part of the municipality of Boca Chica. It was subsequently elevated to municipality status by Law 39-24, enacted on 9 August 2024, becoming administratively independent of Boca Chica.

La Caleta is bordered on the south by the Caribbean Sea, on the north by the municipality of San Antonio de Guerra, on the west by the municipality of Santo Domingo Este, and on the east by the municipality of Boca Chica. It consists of El Valiente, Campo Lindo, Torre B, and Kilometer 22 of the Las Américas Highway, along with several developing neighborhoods. Its first trustee was Máximo Soriano and Juan Alba, a cousin to María de los Ángeles Trujillo Martínez y Alba and cousin-in-law to Rafael Trujillo. According to the 2022 national census, La Caleta had a population of 84,310 inhabitants, comprising 41,188 males and 43,122 females.

The municipality hosts sports clubs, organizations, schools, colleges, clinics, and supermarkets, among others.

The Technological Institute of the Americas (ITLA), the La Caleta Underwater National Park, a golf course (San Andrés), a softball and baseball stadium, a hotel (Quality), an industrial park zone (Las Américas), as well as a small beach are located within the municipality.

== Economy ==
Fishing, trade, semi-tourism, transport unions are local occupations.

== History ==
La Caleta was founded in 1952 and consisted of about 90 houses covered with lime and sand, without a preconceived development plan. Settlers came from many places, including Ibarra, Carvajal, Mosque, Los Castros, Lopez, Perez and Cedeño.

The first settlements in the area were pre-Columbian and belonged to the chieftainship of Higuey.

Between 1955 and 1956, construction began on what is now the Las Americas International Airport, located on the peninsula of Punta Caucedo. The construction led residents to move north, where the town now stands. In 1960 a small number of people who still lived in the south were evicted to complete construction of the International Airport of Las Americas.

In 1972, a second eviction removed settlers who lived south of Las Americas to make way for excavations. They found the remains of an indigenous settlement in the area. In 1974 the Archaeological Park La Caleta was completed.

== Climate ==
Climate data for Las Américas International Airport (1991–2020)
Month	Jan	Feb	Mar	Apr	May	Jun	Jul	Aug	Sep	Oct	Nov	Dec	Year
Mean daily maximum °C (°F)	29.9 (85.8)	30.0 (86.0)	29.9 (85.8)	30.8 (87.4)	31.3 (88.3)	32.1 (89.8)	32.5 (90.5)	32.4 (90.3)	32.3 (90.1)	31.6 (88.9)	30.8 (87.4)	30.2 (86.4)	31.2 (88.2)
Daily mean °C (°F)	24.9 (76.8)	25.0 (77.0)	25.0 (77.0)	26.1 (79.0)	26.8 (80.2)	27.7 (81.9)	27.9 (82.2)	28.0 (82.4)	27.9 (82.2)	27.5 (81.5)	26.3 (79.3)	25.4 (77.7)	26.5 (79.7)
Mean daily minimum °C (°F)	19.9 (67.8)	20.0 (68.0)	20.0 (68.0)	21.3 (70.3)	22.3 (72.1)	23.3 (73.9)	23.3 (73.9)	23.5 (74.3)	23.6 (74.5)	23.3 (73.9)	21.9 (71.4)	20.7 (69.3)	21.9 (71.4)
Average precipitation mm (inches)	48.3 (1.90)	43.8 (1.72)	46.4 (1.83)	77.0 (3.03)	138.6 (5.46)	100.6 (3.96)	132.2 (5.20)	140.4 (5.53)	179.1 (7.05)	170.6 (6.72)	118.7 (4.67)	50.6 (1.99)	1,246.1 (49.06)
Source: NOAA

== Sections ==
- Campo Lindo
- Campo Lindo II
- El Valiente
- Invi
- La Penca
- La Piedra
- Monte Adentro
- Progreso
- Santa Lucia
- Vista Alegre
