= Beach volleyball at the 2023 Pan American Games – Women's tournament =

Beach volleyball – Women's tournament at the 2023 Pan American Games
- Venue: Beach volleyball center
- Dates: October 21–27
- Competitors: 32 from 16 nations

Medalists
Gold medal	Ana Patrícia; Duda Lisboa	Brazil
Silver medal	Melissa Humana-Paredes; Brandie Wilkerson	Canada
Bronze medal	Corinne Quiggle; Sarah Murphy	United States

The women's tournament competition of the beach volleyball events at the 2023 Pan American Games took place between 21 and 27 of October in Santiago, Chile at the Beach volleyball center, a temporary venue in Peñalolén cluster.

== Qualification ==
As the host nation, Chile automatically qualified a team. The best team from NORCECA (North America, Central America and Caribbean) and CSV (South America) at the 2021 Junior Pan American Games also secured a quota. All other quotas were awarded through rankings (the three best teams per gender in the FIVB World Ranking, followed by five teams per gender from NORCECA and CSV.

=== Qualification summary ===
Event/Criteria	Quotas	Qualified NOC's
Host nation	1	Chile
2021 Junior Pan American Games NORCECA	1	Puerto Rico
2021 Junior Pan American Games CSV	1	Brazil
World Rankings	3	United States; Canada; Paraguay
NORCECA Rankings	5	Mexico; Guatemala; Dominican Republic; El Salvador; Costa Rica
CSV Rankings	5	Argentina; Ecuador; Peru; Colombia; Uruguay
Total	16	

== Competition format ==
Each of the 16 pairs in the tournament will be placed in one of four groups of four teams apiece, and play a round-robin within that pool. The top two three in each pool advance to the knockout rounds. The fourth-placed teams in each group, will be eliminated and will play in the 13 to 16 place bracket.

The 12 teams that advanced to the elimination rounds will play a single-elimination tournament with a bronze medal match between the semifinal losers.

== Final standings ==
Rank	Team
1st place, gold medalist(s)	Ana Patrícia Ramos – Eduarda Lisboa (BRA)
2nd place, silver medalist(s)	Melissa Humana-Paredes – Brandie Wilkerson (CAN)
3rd place, bronze medalist(s)	Corinne Quiggle – Sarah Murphy (USA)
4	Ana Gallay – Fernanda Pereyra (ARG)
5	Atenas Gutierrez – Abril Flores (MEX)
6	Claudia Gaona – Lisbeth Allca (PER)
7	Maria Gonzalez Valentin – Allanis Navas (PUR)
8	Chris Vorpahl – Francisca Rivas (CHI)
9	Bethania Almánzar – Julibeth Payano (DOM)
10	Diana Ríos – Margarita Guzman (COL)
11	Erika Mongelós – Michelle Valiente (PAR)
12	Karelys Simisterra Ortiz – Ariana Vilela Becerra (ECU)
13	Kianny Araya Quesada – Angel Williams Paniagua (CRC)
14	Paola Alvarado Franco – Natalia Giron Boesche (EAI)
15	Sol Acuña – Maria Wilkinson (URU)
16	Nadia de Tobar – Laura de Lopez (ESA)
