= Cabo Rojo Beach Volleyball Courts =

Volleyball courts in Cabo Rojo, Puerto Rico

- Location: Hormigueros, Puerto Rico
- Capacity: 600
- Surface: Sand

Construction
- Opened: 2010

Cabo Rojo Beach Volleyball Courts in the Balneario de Boqueron, Cabo Rojo, Puerto Rico. It hosted some of the Beach Volleyball events for the 2010 Central American and Caribbean Games.
