= Dahiana Burgos =

Dominican Republic volleyball player

Personal information
- Full name: Rossy Dahiana Burgos Herrera
- Nationality: Dominican
- Born: 7 April 1985 (age 41) Santo Domingo
- Home town: Santo Domingo
- Height: 1.88 m (6 ft 2 in)
- Weight: 58 kg (128 lb)
- Spike: 312 cm (123 in)
- Block: 302 cm (119 in)

Volleyball information
- Position: Wing Spiker
- Number: 11

National team
- Years: Team
- 2005 -: Dominican Republic
Honours
Women's volleyball
Representing the Dominican Republic
World Grand Champions Cup
Bronze medal – third place	2009 Tokyo/Fukuoka	Team
Pan-American Cup
Silver medal – second place	2011 Ciudad Juárez	Team
Silver medal – second place	2005 Santo Domingo	Team
NORCECA Championship
Bronze medal – third place	2005 Port of Spain	Team
Final Four Cup
Gold medal – first place	2010 Chiapas	Team
Bronze medal – third place	2009 Lima	Team
Central American and Caribbean Games
Gold medal – first place	2010 Mayagüez	Team
- Updated on January 2011

Rossy Dahiana Burgos Herrera (born 7 April 1985, in Santo Domingo) is a retired volleyball and beach volleyball player from the Dominican Republic. She won the bronze medal with the women's national team at the 2005 Pan American Cup in Santo Domingo, Dominican Republic. She plays as a wing-spiker.

== Career ==
Burgos represented her home country at the 2005 Women's U20 Volleyball World Championship, and her team finished in the 9th position. She played for the Dominican club Villa Verde in 2006.

She also participated in the 2007 NORCECA Beach Volleyball Circuit with Rosalin Angeles, finishing in the 10th position. She played for Pueblo Nuevo in 2008.

During the Holy Week Sport Festival held in Hato Mayor, Burgos played Beach Volleyball (three) with Bethania Almanzar and Karla Echenique, winning the silver medal of the event.

Trying to stay in the A2 series in their first year, the Italian club Lavoro.Doc Pontecagnano signed her for the 2009–2010 season.

She won the Most Valuable Player and Best Scorer awards, along with the gold medal, playing in Chiapas, Mexico with her National Senior Team at the 2010 Final Four Cup.

Burgos joined Indias de Mayagüez for the 2011 Liga de Voleibol Superior Femenino season, after posting a 14–8 in the regular season, they earned the bronze medal and she finished among the league's best scorers.

She played with the Peruvian club Universidad César Vallejo for the 2014–15 season, but left them before the end of the season with a high-risk pregnancy. In August 2016 she joined the Banreservas club at the Bameso USA International tournament, held in New York helping them to conquer the first place.

In 2017 she won the gold medal in the Hato Mayor Beach Volleyball Tournament, playing with Ana Esther Lara and Juana González. She later won the silver medal in the 2017 La Romana Reinforced Superior tournament and the gold in the Bonao Superior tournament with Plamed, and later played with the Banreservas team, she won the 2018 Bameso USA International Tournament.

Burgos played the 2021 National District senior tournament, once again playing with Guerreras and won the 2024 Hato Mayor Beach Volleyball tournament gold medal, this time playing with Almánzar and Paola Pérez.

The Major of Santo Domingo Oeste, give her recognition, among other athletes from the Municipality, for their Outstanding Sporting Careers in December 2025. As of 2026, she works as volleyball instructor in the Pedro Martinez Foundation.

== Clubs ==
- (Dominican Republic) Modeca (2002)
- (Dominican Republic) Bameso (2003–2004)
- (Dominican Republic) Liga Juan Guzman (2005)
- (Dominican Republic) Modeca (2005–2006)
- (Dominican Republic) Villa Verde (2006)
- (Italy) Lines Tra.De.Co. Altamura (2005–2006)
- (Dominican Republic) Santo Domingo (2007)
- (Dominican Republic) Pueblo Nuevo (2008)
- (Dominican Republic) Espaillat (2008)
- (Dominican Republic) La Romana (2008)
- (Italy) Lavoro.Doc Pontecagnano (2009–2010)
- (Dominican Republic) Espaillat (2010)
- (Dominican Republic) Lava Pies (2010)
- (Dominican Republic) Villa Gonzalez (2010)
- (Puerto Rico) Indias de Mayagüez (2011)
- (Dominican Republic) Puñal (2011)
- (Peru) Universidad César Vallejo (2014–2015)
- (Dominican Republic) Banreservas (2016)
- (Dominican Republic) Villaverde (2017)
- (Dominican Republic) Plamed (2017)
- (Dominican Republic) BanReservas (2018)
- (Dominican Republic) Guerreras (2018–2019)
- (Dominican Republic) Guerreras (2021)

== Awards ==
=== Individuals ===
- 2010 Final Four Cup "Most Valuable Player"
- 2010 Final Four Cup "Best Scorer"

==== Clubs ====
- Italian League A2 – Runner-Up, with Lines Tra.De.Co. Altamura
- 2011 Puerto Rican League – Bronze medal, with Indias de Mayagüez
- 2014-2015 Peruvian League – Bronze medal, with Universidad César Vallejo

=== Beach volleyball ===
- 2009 Hato Mayor Beach Volleyball Tournament Silver Medal
- 2017 Hato Mayor Beach Volleyball Tournament Gold Medal
- 2024 Hato Mayor Beach Volleyball Tournament Gold Medal
