= Sylvana Gómez =

Guatemalan beach volleyball player

Personal information
- Full name: Sylvana Anali Rivera Gómez
- Nationality: Guatemala

Beach volleyball information
Teammate
María Orellana

Sylvana Anali Rivera Gómez is a beach volleyball player from Guatemala, who played with María Orellana in the 2003 Pan American Games in Santo Domingo, Dominican Republic. They finished in the 5th position.
