= Laura Tomes =

American volleyball player (born 1985)

Personal information
- Nationality: American
- Born: February 16, 1985 (age 41)

Volleyball information
- Number: 7 (national team)

National team
| 2007 | United States |

Laura Tomes (born February 16, 1985) is a retired American female volleyball player. She was part of the United States women's national volleyball team.

She participated at the 2007 Pan American Games.
