= Kirenia Ballar =

Cuban beach volleyball player

Personal information
- Full name: Kirenia Ballar Bell
- Born: Havana, Cuba
Honours
Women's beach volleyball
Representing Cuba
NORCECA Beach Volleyball Circuit
Gold medal – first place	2009 Cayman Islands	Beach
Gold medal – first place	2009 Guatemala	Beach
Gold medal – first place	2009 Boca Chica	Beach
Silver medal – second place	2007 Port of Spain	Beach
Bronze medal – third place	2007 Boca Chica	Beach

Kirenia Ballar Bell (born in Havana) is a beach volleyball player from Cuba, who participated in the NORCECA Beach Volleyball Circuit in 2007, playing with Ion Canet, and 2009, with Nirian Sinal.

At the 2nd ALBA Games she won the silver medal, playing with Nirian Sinal. She also won the gold medal at the Cuban National Games in 2008, playing with Kirenia Reina.
