= Patricia Oillataguerre =

Argentine volleyball player (born 1988)

Personal information
- Nationality: Argentine
- Born: 7 June 1988 (age 38)
- Height: 198 cm (78 in)
- Weight: 80 kg (176 lb)
- Spike: 310 cm (122 in)
- Block: 295 cm (116 in)

Volleyball information
- Number: 4 (national team)

Career
Years	Teams
2014	San Lorenzo

National team
2007-2015	Argentina

Patricia Oillataguerre (born 7 June 1988) is an Argentine volleyball player. She is part of the Argentina women's national volleyball team.

She participated in the 2014 FIVB Volleyball World Grand Prix. On club level she played for San Lorenzo in 2014.
