= Marie-Andrée Lessard =

Canadian beach volleyball player (born 1977)

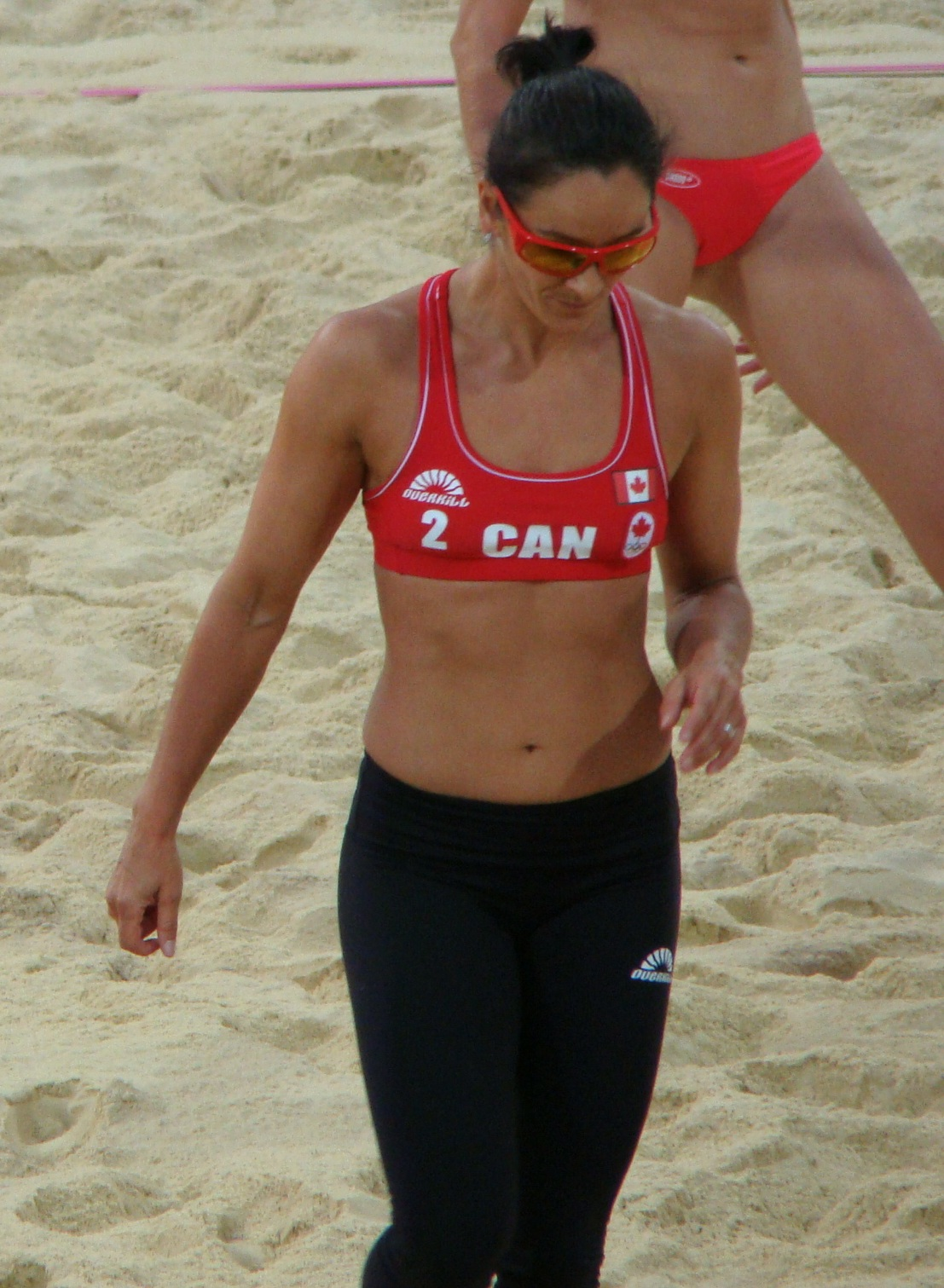
- Lessard at the 2012 Summer Olympics

Personal information
- Nationality: Canada
- Born: 6 December 1977 (age 48)

Beach volleyball information
Teammate
Annie Martin

Marie-Andrée Lessard (born 6 December 1977) is a Canadian female beach volleyball player. As of 2012, she plays with Annie Martin. The pair took part in the 2012 Summer Olympics tournament and were eliminated after losing their three pool matches.
