= Rosalín Ángeles =

Dominican volleyball player (born 1985)

Personal information
- Full name: Rosalín Elina Ángeles Rojas
- Born: 23 July 1985 (age 41); Santo Domingo
- Height: 1.89 m (6 ft 2 1/2 in)
- Weight: 61 kg (134 lb)
- Spike: 310 cm (122 in)
- Block: 300 cm (118 in)

Volleyball information
- Position: Setter / Opposite
Honours
Women's volleyball
Representing the Dominican Republic
Pan American Games
Gold medal – first place	2003 Santo Domingo	Team
Pan-American Cup
Gold medal – first place	2014 Mexico City	Team
Silver medal – second place	2015 Lima/Callao	Team
Bronze medal – third place	2007 Colima	Team

Rosalín Elina Ángeles Rojas (born 23 July 1985, in Santo Domingo) is a retired volleyball player from the Dominican Republic, who won the gold medal with the women's national team at the 2003 Pan American Games in her home town Santo Domingo, Dominican Republic.

Playing as a setter she also competed at the 2007 FIVB World Grand Prix for her native country, wearing the #2 jersey.

== Beach volleyball ==
She won the gold medal of the Dominican Republic National Championship 2006 playing with Cinthia Piñeiro. In 2007, she played the first leg of the NORCECA Beach Volleyball Circuit playing with Dahiana Burgos, finishing in 10th place.

Ángeles won the gold medal in the 2014 National Championship, playing with Ana Binet.

== Clubs ==
- (Dominican Republic) Deportivo Nacional (2002–2003)
- (Dominican Republic) Mirador (2004–2005)
- (Dominican Republic) Bameso (2005–2006)
- (Dominican Republic) Deportivo Nacional (2007)

== Awards ==
=== Beach volleyball ===
- 2006 National Championship Gold Medal
- 2014 National Championship Gold Medal
