= Charlin Vargas =

Dominican Republic beach volleyball player

Personal information
- Nationality: Dominican Republic
- Born: Dominican Republic

Beach volleyball information

Current teammate
Teammate
Ezequiel Castillo

Charlin Vargas is a male beach volleyball player from Dominican Republic, who participated the 2006 NORCECA Men’s Beach Volleyball Continental Championship with Yewddys Pérez.

He also competed at the 2007 NORCECA Beach Volleyball Circuit with Roberto De La Rosa; and in 2008 with Yewddys Pérez and Roberto de Jesús.

At the Dominican Beach Tour 2008, he won a bronze medal, playing with Ezequiel Castillo.

He also earned second place with Bahoruco at the Dominican Republic Volleyball League playing indoor volleyball.

== Clubs ==
- (Dominican Republic) Espaillat (2008)
- (Dominican Republic) Bahoruco (2008)
