= Bethania Almánzar =

Dominican volleyball player

Personal information
- Full name: Bethania Almánzar Sosa
- Nickname: Bety
- Born: February 11, 1987 (age 39); Bonao, Dominican Republic
- Hometown: Bonao, Dominican Republic
- Height: 180 cm (5 ft 11 in)
- Weight: 62 kg (137 lb)

Beach volleyball information

Current teammate
| Years | Teammate |
|---|---|
| 2023 | Julibeth Payano |
Honours
Women's Beach Volleyball
Representing the Dominican Republic
Central American and Caribbean Games
| Silver medal – second place | 2023 San Salvador | Beach |
NORCECA Beach Volleyball Circuit
| Silver medal – second place | Guatemala City 2007 | Beach |
| Silver medal – second place | Carolina 2007 | Beach |
- Last updated: 7 November 2023

Bethania Almánzar Sosa (born February 11, 1987, in Bonao) is a female beach volleyball and volleyball player from the Dominican Republic. She twice won the NORCECA Beach Volleyball Circuit 2007, partnering Margarita Suero. She played the 2023 Beach Volleyball World Championships and won the silver medal in the 2023 Central American and Caribbean Games playing with Julibeth Payano.

== Career ==
Almánzar played with the club Los Prados from 2004 to 2006, winning the 2005 Dominican Metropolitan League with this club.

She trained in 2005 with the senior national indoor team in 2005, since the team split under the guidance of the Cuban trainer Ismael Ortega just before the 2006 FIVB World Championship qualification.

Almánzar won the silver medal during the 2006 National Games, playing with the North Region.

She twice won the silver medal in the women's competition at the NORCECA Beach Volleyball Circuit 2007 in Guatemala City and Carolina, Puerto Rico, partnering Margarita Suero.

Playing with Daniela Rosario, she won the Dominican Republic National Beach Volleyball Tour in 2008.

In Indoor volleyball, she won the bronze medal in 2007 and 2008 at the Dominican Republic Volleyball League playing with Santiago.

She won the 2008 Bonao Athlete of the Year award for her performance during 2008, and she was also contending for her province to the "Premio Nacional de la Juventud", for Sport Achievements.

Almánzar participated during the 2009 Holy Week Sport Festival held in Hato Mayor, playing Beach Volleyball (three) with Dahiana Burgos and Karla Echenique, winning the Silver Medal of the event. She was enlisted for the national beach volleyball team under the guidance of the Cuban coach Carlos Suarez training for the 2010 Central American and Caribbean Games. She played indoor volleyball with the Dominican Republic National team that won the silver medal at the 2010 Central American and Caribbean University Games.

She played the 2011 Santiago Intermunicipal Tournament with Navarrete, leading them to win the preliminary round with a 6–0 mark.

She won the 2014 Hato Mayor Volleyball tournament gold medal with Darielis Ravelo and Soranyi Aquino. Almánzar played with the club Manoguayabo in the 2015 Santo Domingo volleyball tournament. In August 2016 she traveled to New York with the BanReservas team to play the Bameso USA International tournament, winning the first place.

Almánzar played with Iris Santos and Anahí Lebrón the 2017 Hato Mayor Beach Volleyball Tournament, where they were beaten by Ana Esther Lara, Juana González and Dahiana Burgos, settling with the tournaments silver medal. She later joined the Bonao club in the 2017 North Central ligue championship, were her team claime the bronze medal and she later won the X Bonao Reinforced Volleyball tournament with Plamed.

Playing with Esmeralda Ramírez and Pamela Suárez she won the Hato Mayor Beach Volleyball Tournament, representing INAPA.

With the Banreservas team, she won undefeated the IX Bameso USA International Tournament, held in the Riverbank State Park in New York City. She played with the INAPA indoor team, winning in their 57th anniversary tournament. She was awarded Best Scorer and Most Valuable Player. Almánzar won the XLV Santiago Intermunicipal Volleyball Tournament championship and the Best Spiker individual award, playing with Cienfuegos. She won the silver medal and the Best Spiker award, playing with Bonao in the Cibao Cup.

She won the silver medal in the 2020 National Championship, when her club, Santiago lost 1-3 the final match to National District.

Almánzar helped Los Mina to win the Santo Domingo Superior Tournament, she was elected Most Valuable Player. She then helped Bonao to win the 2021 version of the Cibao Cup. Later Almanzar played with Caribeñas-New Horizons VC at the Dominican Republic Superior Volleyball League from the National District, she ended up winning the tournament second place when her team was defeated 0–3 in the final series by Cristo Rey.

=== 2022 ===
She won the Villa Tapia Beach Tournament, playing as the Banreservas team with Maite Camacho and Esmeralda Ramírez and the first stage of the 2022 National Beach Volleyball Circuit played in Macao, La Altagracia partnering with Esmeralda Ramírez. She then won the indoor National Superior Volleyball Tournament with Bonao and was elected Most Valuable Player.

In October, Almanzar returned to the NORCECA Beach Volleyball Tour, winning the fifth place with Esmeralda Ramírez playing in Punta Cana and a fourth place in Hato Mayor, also with Ramírez, before ranking fourth in Cayman Islands and sixth at the Continental Tour Final, held in Punta Cana, both of them with Crismil Paniagua.

=== 2023 ===
With Crismil Paniagua, Almanzar played the Grand Cayman stage of the NORCECA Beach Volleyball Tour, ranking 13th. She won the 2023 Hato Mayor Beach Volleyball tournament silver medal, playing with Michel Cruz and Génesis Durán. She ranked fourth after falling 0–2 to the Canadian pair in the World Championship Qualifier stage held in Punta Cana, this time playing with Julibeth Payano. Playing with Payano, she won the Beach Volleyball competition at the 2023 Central American and Caribbean Games silver medal, losing 1–2 to the Puerto Rican team. They later commented that they got along very well throughout the tournament despite only having been playing together for a month. They played together the World Championships held in Tlaxcala, Mexico where they finished without victories in the group stage, after losing their three games 0–2 against Australians Mariafe Artacho del Solar and Taliqua Clancy, Polish Jagoda Gruszczyńska and Aleksandra Wachowicz and Spaniards Liliana Fernández and Paula Soria Gutiérrez, Then represented her home country in the Pan American Games finishing in ninth position with three wins and three losses.

=== 2024 ===
She won the 2024 Hato Mayor Beach Volleyball tournament gold medal, this time playing with Burgos and Paola Pérez. She played indoor volleyball with her native team of Bonao at the Dominican Republic National Champions Cup, helping her team to win the third place when her club lost to Distrito Nacional for the second place and she was awarded tournament's Best Spiker and Best Scorer.

== Clubs ==
- (Dominican Republic) Los Prados (2004–2006)
- (Dominican Republic) Boca Chica (2006)
- (Dominican Republic) Santiago (2007–2008)
- (Dominican Republic) Bonao (2010)
- (Dominican Republic) Navarrete (2011)
- (Dominican Republic) Manoguayabo (2014–2015)
- (Dominican Republic) BanReservas (2016)
- (Dominican Republic) Bonao (2017)
- (Dominican Republic) Plamed (2017)
- (Dominican Republic) BanReservas (2019)
- (Dominican Republic) Inapa (2019)
- (Dominican Republic) Bonao (2019)
- (Dominican Republic) Santiago (2020)
- (Dominican Republic) Los Mina (2021)
- (Dominican Republic) Bonao (2021)
- (Dominican Republic) Caribeñas-New Horizons VC (2021)
- (Dominican Republic) Bonao (2022–2024)

== Awards ==
=== Individual ===
- 2008 Unión Deportiva Monseñor Nouel "Athlete of the Year"
- 2019 Santiago Intermunicipal Tournament "Best Spiker"
- 2019 Cibao Cup "Best Spiker"
- 2021 Santo Domingo Superior Tournament "Most Valuable Player"
- 2022 National Superior Volleyball Tournament "Most Valuable Player"
- 2024 National Champions Cup "Best Scorer"
- 2024 National Champions Cup "Best Spiker"

=== Beach Volleyball ===
- 2007 NORCECA Beach Volleyball Circuit Guatemala Silver Medal
- 2007 NORCECA Beach Volleyball Circuit Puerto Rico Silver Medal
- 2008 Dominican Republic National Beach Volleyball Tour Gold Medal
- 2009 Hato Mayor Beach Volleyball Tournament Silver Medal
- 2014 Hato Mayor Beach Volleyball Tournament Gold Medal
- 2015 Hato Mayor Beach Volleyball Tournament Bronze Medal
- 2016 Hato Mayor Beach Volleyball Tournament Silver Medal
- 2017 Hato Mayor Beach Volleyball Tournament Silver Medal
- 2019 Hato Mayor Beach Volleyball Tournament Gold Medal
- 2023 Hato Mayor Beach Volleyball Tournament Silver Medal
- 2024 Hato Mayor Beach Volleyball Tournament Gold Medal

=== Clubs ===
- 2005 Dominican Metropolitan League – Champion, with Los Prados
- 2005 Santo Domingo Superior Tournament – Champion, with Boca Chica
- 2007 Dominican Republic Volleyball League – 3rd Place, with Santiago
- 2008 Dominican Republic Volleyball League – 3rd Place, with Santiago
- 2010 Dominican Republic Volleyball League – 3rd Place, with Bonao
- 2019 Santiago Intermunicipal Tournament – Champion, with Cienfuegos
- 2019 Cibao Cup – 2nd Place, with Bonao
- 2020 National Championship – 2nd Place, with Santiago
- 2021 Santo Domingo Superior Tournament – Champion, with Los Mina
- 2021 Cibao Cup – Champion, with Bonao
- 2021 Dominican Republic Superior Volleyball League – 2nd Place, with Caribeñas-New Horizons
- 2022 National Superior Volleyball Tournament – Champion, with Bonao
- 2024 Dominican Republic National Champions Cup – 3rd Place, with Bonao
