= Ezequiel Castillo (beach volleyball) =

Dominican Republic beach volleyball player

Personal information
- Nationality: Dominican Republic

Beach volleyball information
Teammate
Roberto de Jesús, Charlie Castillo, Charlin Vargas, Sánchez Ramírez

Ezequiel Castillo is a male beach volleyball player from Dominican Republic, who participated the 2006 NORCECA Men’s Beach Volleyball Continental Championship with Roberto de Jesús.

During the 2006 National Games in Dominican Republic, he won the silver medal at the beach volleyball competition, partnering Charlie Castillo.

At the Dominican Beach Tour 2008, he won a bronze medal, playing with Charlin Vargas.

He also earned a bronze medal with Sánchez Ramírez at the 2008 Dominican Republic Volleyball League playing indoor volleyball.

== Clubs ==
- (Dominican Republic) Sánchez Ramírez (2008)
