= Yarleen Santiago =

Puerto Rican beach volleyball player

Personal information
- Full name: Yarleen Santiago Pagán
- Nationality: Puerto Rican
- Born: January 18, 1978 (age 48) Arecibo, Puerto Rico
- Home town: San Juan
- Height: 1.82 m (6 ft 0 in)
- Weight: 72 kg (159 lb)
Beach volleyball information
Current teammate
- Years: Teammate
- 2009: Dariam Acevedo
Previous teammates
- Years: Teammate
- 2007 2008: Yamileska Yantín; Sheila Conley
Honours
Women's beach volleyball
Representing Puerto Rico
Pan American Games
| Bronze medal – third place | 2011 Guadalajara | Beach |
NORCECA Beach Volleyball Circuit
| Gold medal – first place | 2009 Montelimar | Beach |
| Gold medal – first place | 2007 Carolina | Beach |
| Silver medal – second place | 2009 Jamaica | Beach |
| Bronze medal – third place | 2008 Carolina | Beach |

Yarleen Santiago Pagán (born January 18, 1978, in Arecibo, Puerto Rico) is a female beach volleyball player who won the gold medal at the NORCECA Circuit 2009 at Montelimar, Nicaragua playing with Dariam Acevedo.

At home, Santiago was runner-up of the beach professional circuit Circuito de Voleibol Playero Profesional, playing with Sheila Conley. In 2009, playing with Dariam Acevedo, she won the championship.

== College ==
Santiago studied and played at the University of Arkansas as an outside hitter. There, between 1997 and 1999, she earned AVCA All District/All region, All Southeastern Conference (SEC) Team and SEC All-Tournament Team honors every year. She also led her team in digs every season between 1997 and 1999. She earned the Freshman of the Year Award in 1997.

== Indoor ==
Santiago retired from the Puerto Rican national volleyball team in 2007 after having represented her home country in many events. At the 2006 Women's Pan-American Volleyball Cup, she won the Best Defense Award.

Santiago also played professionally in 2009 with Gigantes de Carolina from Liga de Voleibol Superior Femenino.

== Clubs ==
- (Puerto Rico) Ganaderas de Hatillo (1994)
- (Italy) Marche Metalli Castelfidardo (2004–2005)
- (Puerto Rico) Gigantes de Carolina (2006)
- (Puerto Rico) Criollas de Caguas (2007–2008)
- (Puerto Rico) Gigantes de Carolina (2009)

== Awards ==
=== Individuals ===
- 2009 Liga de Voleibol Superior Femenino "All-Star"
- 2006 Pan-American Cup "Best Defender"

=== College ===
- 1999 SEC Player of the Week, (Week 2 and Week 10)
- 1999 AVCA All-District 4/All-Region First Team
- 1998 AVCA All-District 4/All-Region Second Team
- 1997 AVCA All-District 4/All-Region First Team
- 1999 All Southeastern Conference First Team
- 1998 All Southeastern Conference Second Team
- 1997 All Southeastern Conference First Team
- 1997–1999 SEC All-Tournament Team
- 1997 Asics/Volleyball Division I Freshman of the year

=== National team ===
- NORCECA Beach Volleyball Circuit Nicaragua 2009 Gold Medal
- NORCECA Beach Volleyball Circuit Jamaica 2009 Silver Medal

=== Beach ===
- 2008 Circuito de Voleibol Playero Profesional – Champion
- 2008 Circuito de Voleibol Playero Profesional – Runner-Up

=== Clubs ===
- Liga de Voleibol Superior Femenino 2008 – Runner-Up, with Criollas de Caguas
- Liga de Voleibol Superior Femenino 2007 – Runner-Up, with Criollas de Caguas
- Liga de Voleibol Superior Femenino 2006 – Champion, with Gigantes de Carolina
