= Mike Szymanski =

American politician (born 1946)

Member of the Alaska Senate
- In office 1987–1990

Member of the Alaska House of Representatives
- In office 1983–1986

Personal details
- Born: May 23, 1946 (age 80) Anchorage, Alaska
- Party: Democratic

Mike Szymanski (born May 23, 1946) was an American politician who served as a member of the Alaska Senate. Previously he was a member of the Alaska House of Representatives. He was an unsuccessful candidate in the 2016 Alaska Senate election. He endorsed the Joe Biden 2020 presidential campaign.
