= Ginnette del Rosario =

Dominican Republic volleyball player (born 1986)

Ginnette del Rosario Selmo (born 12 May 1986 in Santo Domingo) is a retired volleyball player from the Dominican Republic, who participated with the women's national team at the 2007 World Cup in Japan. She competed as a middle blocker. Ginnette is the twin sister of Gina del Rosario.

== Beach volley ==
Along with her twin sister, Gina, she played at the NORCECA Beach Volleyball Circuit in 2008 and 2009.

== Clubs ==
- (Dominican Republic) Deportivo Nacional (2003)
- (Dominican Republic) Los Prados (2005)
- (Dominican Republic) Deportivo Nacional (2007)
- (Dominican Republic) Distrito Nacional (2008)
