= Margarita Suero =

Female volleyball player from the Dominican Republic

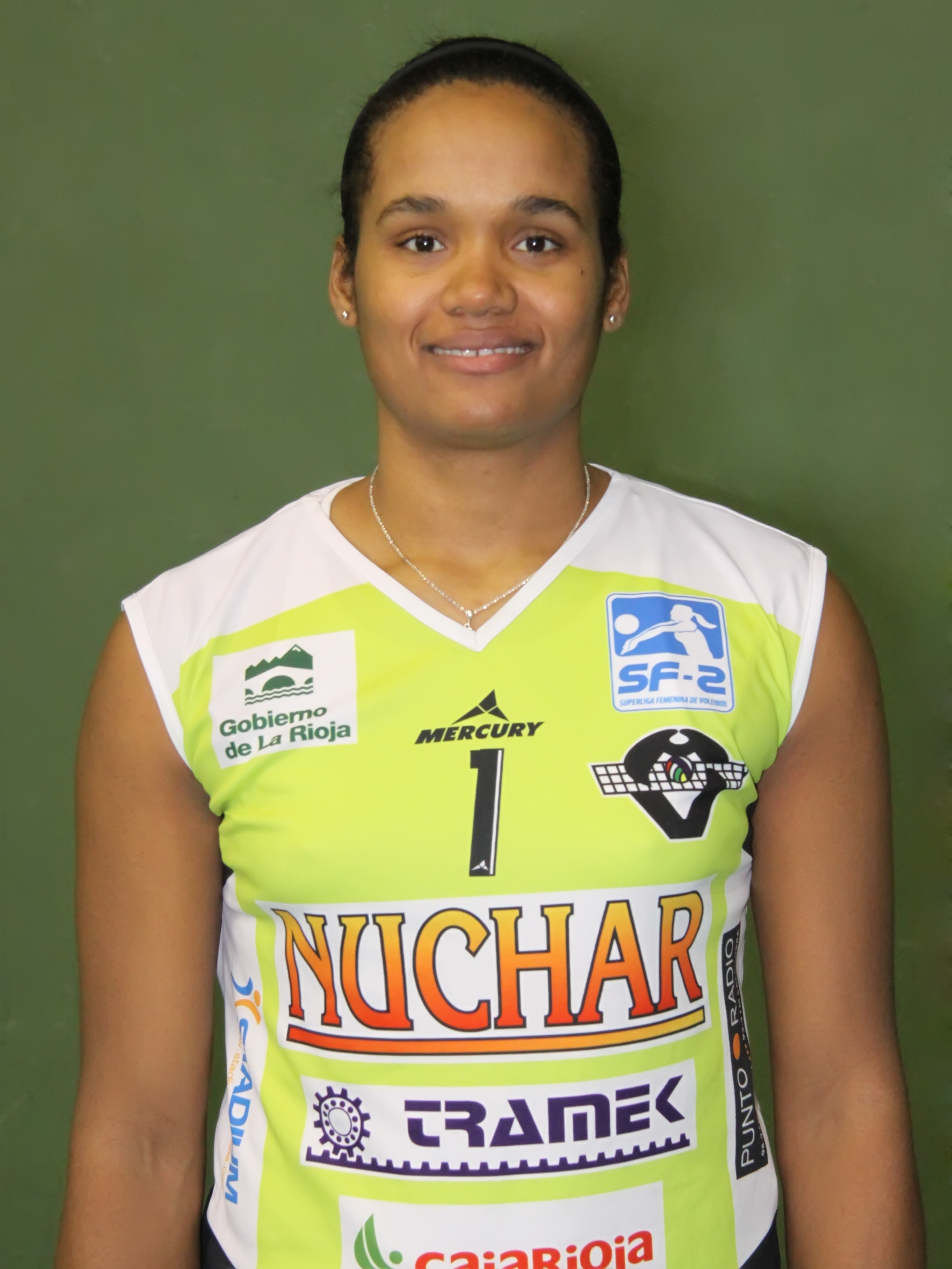

Personal information
- Full name: Margarita Suero Furcal
- Nickname: Margo
- Born: June 16, 1982 (age 44); Santo Domingo, Dominican Republic
- Height: 1.85 m (6 ft 1 in)
- Weight: 70 kg (150 lb)

Volleyball information
- Position: Wing Spiker
- Current club: (Spain) Nuchar Tramek Murillo
- Number: 1

National team
2000-2002	Dominican Republic
Honours
Women's Beach Volleyball
Representing the Dominican Republic
NORCECA Beach Volleyball Circuit
Silver medal – second place	Guatemala City 2007	Beach
Silver medal – second place	Carolina 2007	Beach

Margarita Suero Furcal (born June 16, 1982, in Santo Domingo) is a female beach volleyball and volleyball player from the Dominican Republic, who competed for her native country at the 2001 FIVB Junior Volleyball World Championship in Santo Domingo, Dominican Republic wearing the number #4 jersey. There her team ended up in the 9th place.

== Career ==
In beach volleyball she won the silver medal at the 2006 National Championship and later that year represented her home country at the 2006 Central American and Caribbean Games partnering Rosa Medrano and finishing in 6th place.
She won two times the silver medal in the women's competition at the NORCECA Beach Volleyball Circuit 2007 in Guatemala City and Carolina, Puerto Rico, playing with Bethania Almánzar.
In indoor volleyball, She signed with the Division 2 (Second Division) Spanish team Nuchar Tramek Murillo for the 2007/2008 season, helping it to climb to Liga FEV for 2008/2009 and then to Superliga 2 for the 2009/2010 season.
Returning to the sand, and playing with the experienced Spanish beachvolley player Clara Lozano she won the Torneo de Logroño 2009.
Playing with Nuchar Tramek Murillo, she won with her team the Superliga 2 Princess Cup in 2010.

== Clubs ==
- (Dominican Republic) Paraiso (1997)
- (Dominican Republic) Naco (1998–2000)
- (Dominican Republic) Los Cachorros (2001–2004)
- (Dominican Republic) Liga Juan Guzman (2005)
- (Dominican Republic) Modeca (2006)
- (Spain) Nuchar Tramek Murillo (2007–2010)

== Awards ==
=== Beach Volleyball ===
==== National team ====
- National Championship 2006 Silver Medal
- NORCECA Beach Volleyball Circuit Guatemala 2007 Silver Medal
- NORCECA Beach Volleyball Circuit Puerto Rico 2007 Silver Medal

==== International ====
- 2009 Logroño Beach Volleyball Tournament – Gold Medal

=== Clubs ===
- 2005 Dominican Republic Distrito Nacional Superior Tournament – Runner-Up, with Liga Juan Guzman
- 2007/2008 Spanish Women's Second Division – Champion, with Nuchar Tramek Murillo
- 2008/2009 Spanish Women's Liga FEV – Runner-Up, with Nuchar Tramek Murillo
- 2010 Princess Cup Superliga 2 – Champion, with Nuchar Tramek Murillo
