= Gina del Rosario =

Dominican Republic volleyball player (born 1986)

Personal information
- Born: May 12, 1986 (age 40)
- Height: 1.91 m (6 ft 3 in)
Medal record
Women's volleyball
Representing the Dominican Republic
NORCECA Championship
Bronze medal – third place	2007 Winnipeg	Team
Pan-American Cup
Bronze medal – third place	2007 Colima	Team

Gina del Rosario Selmo (born May 12, 1986, in Santo Domingo) is a volleyball player from the Dominican Republic, who won the bronze medal with the women's national team at the 2007 Panamerican Cup in Colima, Mexico. Later that year, she also won the bronze medal at the NORCECA Championship in Winnipeg, Manitoba, Canada. Gina is the twin sister of Ginnette Del Rosario.

Playing as a setter, she also competed at the 2007 FIVB World Grand Prix for her native country, wearing the #8 jersey.

== Beach volley ==
Along with her twin sister, Ginnette, she played at the 2008 and 2009 NORCECA Beach Volleyball Circuit.

== Clubs ==
- (Dominican Republic) Deportivo Nacional (2003)
- (Dominican Republic) Liga Juan Guzman (2005)
- (Dominican Republic) Deportivo Nacional (2007)
- (Dominican Republic) Distrito Nacional (2008)
