= Vanessa Vélez =

Puerto Rican volleyball player (born 1989)

Personal information
- Nationality: Puerto Rico
- Born: 29 August 1989 (age 37) Ciales, Puerto Rico
- Height: 1.8 m (5 ft 11 in)
- Weight: 68 kg (150 lb)
- Spike: 292 cm (115 in)
- Block: 280 cm (110 in)

Volleyball information

Career
- Years: Team
- 2014–2015: Gigantes de Carolina
Honours
Women's volleyball
Representing Puerto Rico
Pan-American Cup

Vanessa Vélez (born 29 August 1989 Ciales, Puerto Rico) is a Puerto Rican female volleyball player. She is a member of the Puerto Rico women's national volleyball team. She was part of the Puerto Rican National Team at the 2014 FIVB Volleyball Women's World Championship in Italy, and 2014 Women's Pan-American Volleyball Cup.

== Clubs ==
- (Puerto Rico) Gigantes de Carolina (2014–2015)
- (Puerto Rico) Valencianas de Juncos (2021)
