= Ingrid Morales =

Costa Rican beach volleyball player (born 1975)

Personal information
- Full name: Ingrid Patricia Morales Muñoz
- Nickname: Ingrid
- Born: May 29, 1975 (age 51); San José, Costa Rica
- Hometown: San José, Costa Rica
- Height: 170 cm (5 ft 7 in)
- Weight: 62 kg (137 lb)

Beach volleyball information

Current teammate
Years	Teammate	Tours (points)
2009	Nathalia Alfaro	250
Honours
Women's beach volleyball
Representing Costa Rica
NORCECA Beach Volleyball Circuit
Silver medal – second place	2008 Boca Chica	Beach
Silver medal – second place	2009 Montelimar	Beach
Silver medal – second place	2009 Boca Chica	Beach
Bronze medal – third place	2009 Kingston	Beach
Bronze medal – third place	2009 Guatemala City	Beach

Ingrid Patricia Morales Muñoz (born May 29, 1975 in San José) is a beach volleyball player from Costa Rica, who played in the Swatch FIVB World Tour 2005 at the Acapulco step, playing with Nathalia Alfaro.

Representing her native country during the 2007 Pan American Games Beach Volleyball tournament, she finished 9th.

She won the silver medal at the 2008 NORCECA Beach Volleyball Circuit (Santo Domingo).

At her home country, she has won five consecutive beach volleyball Championships, since 2005 to 2009.

== Indoor Volleyball ==
With her National Indoor Team she played at the 2002 Central American and Caribbean Games and the 2006 version, finishing 6th and 7th. Also she played at the 2006 FIVB Women's World Championship.
