= Boca Chica =

Municipality in Santo Domingo, Dominican Republic

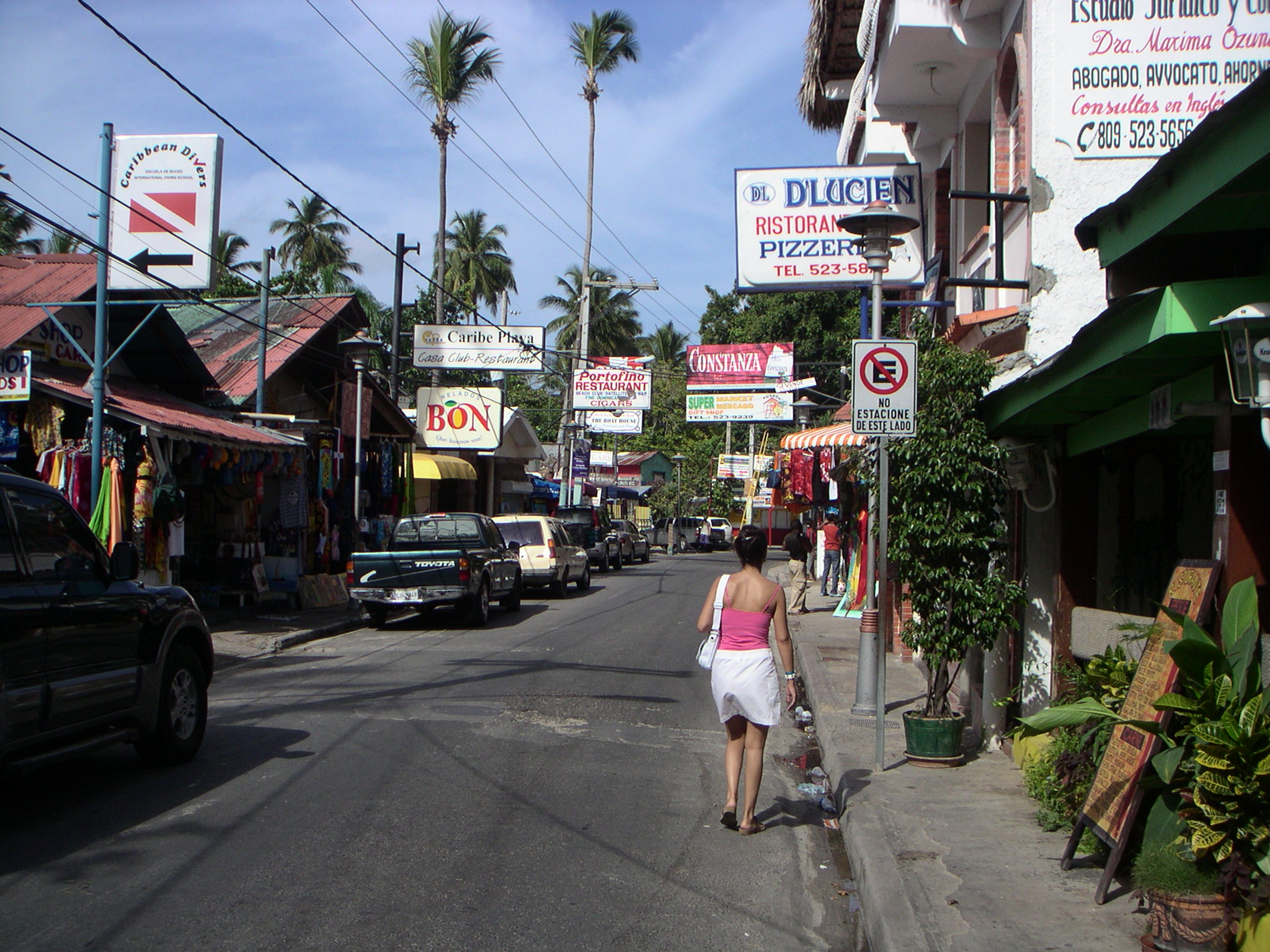
- Streets of Boca Chica (2004)

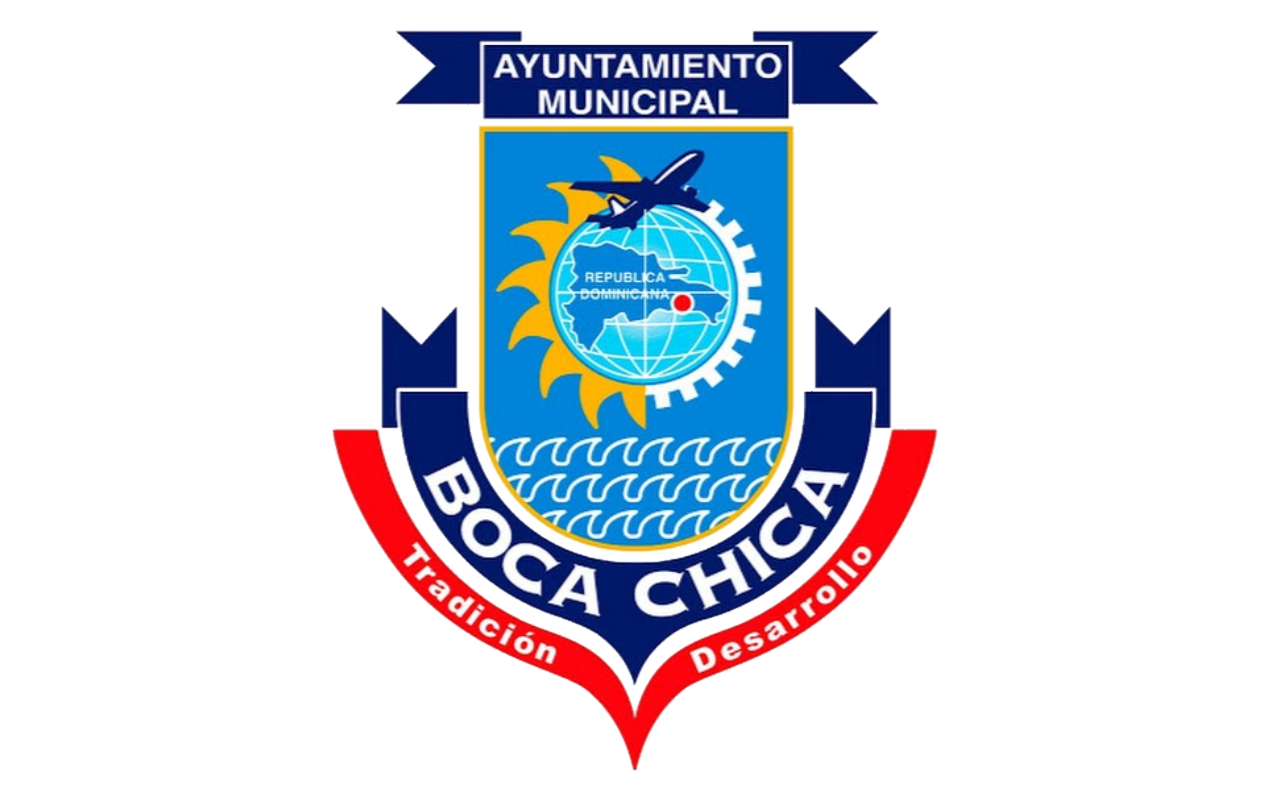
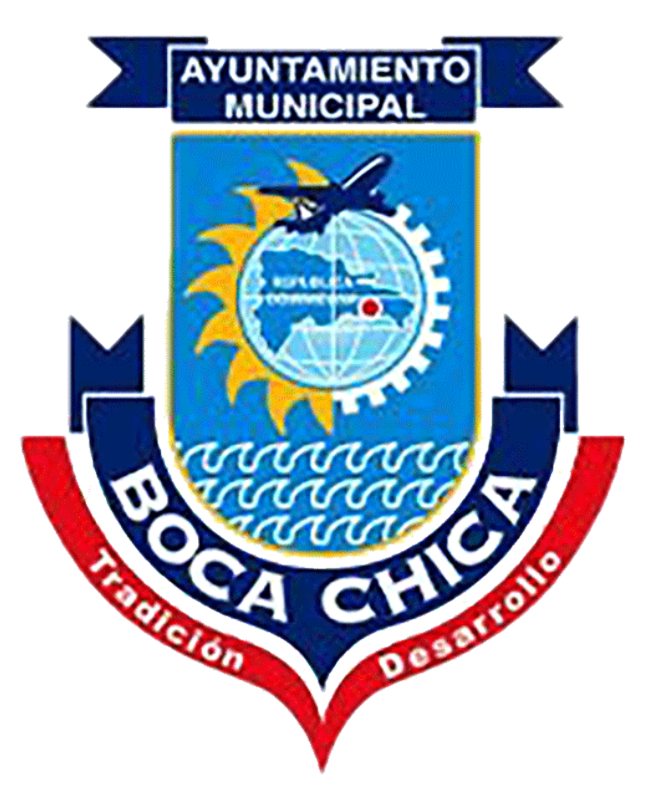
- Flag Coat of arms

- Boca Chica in the Dominican Republic
- Coordinates: 18°27′14″N 69°36′23″W
- Country: Dominican Republic
- Province: Santo Domingo
- Incorporated: 2001

Government
  - Mayor: Ramón Arístides Candelaria Santana (PCR)

Area
  - Total: 145.67 km^{2} (56.24 sq mi)

Population (2022 census)
  - Total: 167,040
  - Density: 1,146.7/km^{2} (2,969.9/sq mi)
  - Urban: 104,951
- Municipal Districts: 1
- Website: ayuntamientobocachica.gob.do (in Spanish)

Boca Chica is a municipality (municipio) of the Santo Domingo province in the Dominican Republic. Within the municipality there is one municipal district (distritos municipal): La Caleta. As of the 2022 census it had 167,040 inhabitants, 104,951 living in the city itself and 62,089 in its rural districts (Secciones).

Boca Chica has a popular beach with the same name, located about 30 kilometers east of Santo Domingo de Guzmán in the south-east region of the country.

== History ==
The community of Boca Chica was founded in 1779 during the government of Brigadier Don Isidro Peralta y Rojas with the name of San José de los Llanos. Boca Chica was later established by Dominican businessman and politician Juan Bautista Vicini Burgos, who developed sugar plantations there in the early 1900s. Boca Chica was developed by the Dominican state through the Boca Chica sugar company in 1916 and throughout the 1920s. In 1926 the highway was built that would connect it with the city of Santo Domingo.

In November 1932, by order of Dominican dictator Rafael Leónidas Trujillo, Boca Chica was separated from the province of San Pedro de Macorís to form part of the National District. The golden era of Boca Chica began in the 1940s, when Trujillo ordered the construction of a modern hotel named "Hotel Hamaca", which subsequently became an icon in the area. During the 1950s prominent families of the Dominican Republic built several summer properties along the beach only accessible by private transportation. The hotel also became more famous after Trujillo granted political asylum to the dictator Fulgencio Batista.

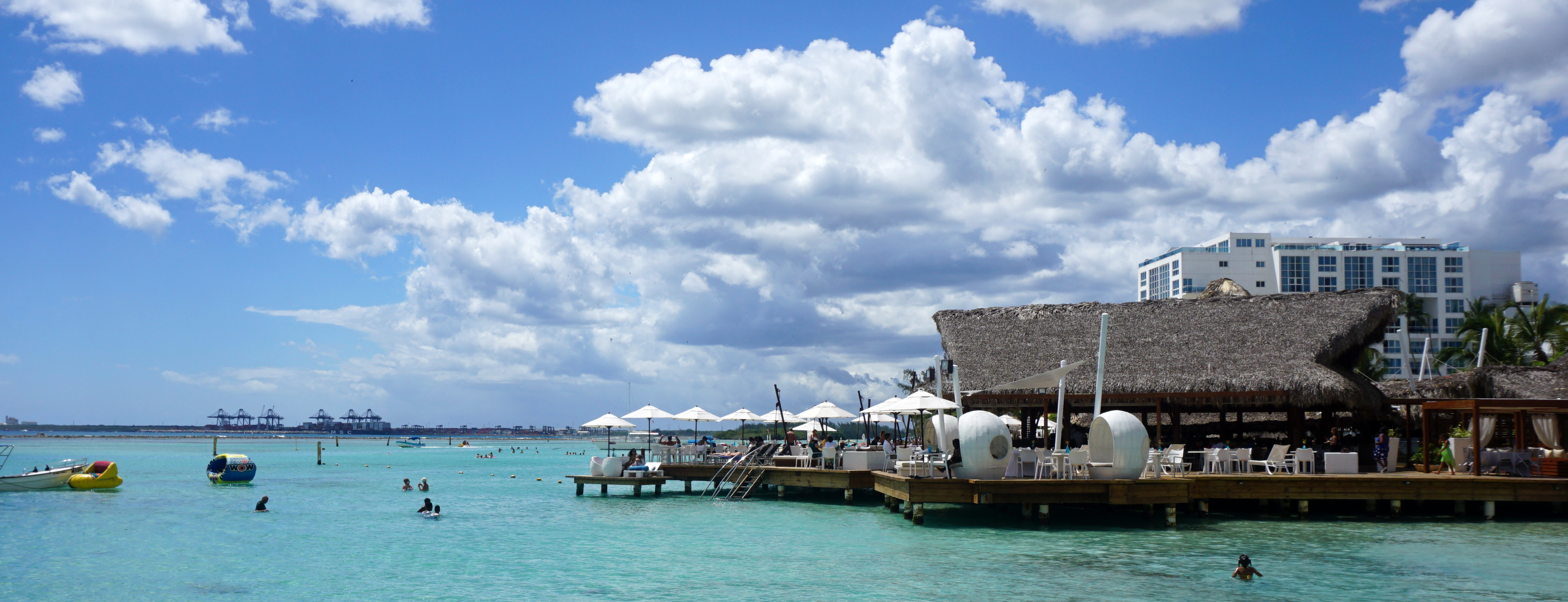
Boca Chica beach panorama view

After the assassination of Rafael Trujillo in 1961 the beach became more accessible to the public. The beach became increasingly more popular and public transportation helped to make Boca Chica a very crowded place in the 1960s and 1970s; it was no longer a secluded beach for the elites as it had been during the 1950s. The Hamaca hotel was closed after Hurricane David in 1979, and it remained closed and abandoned for years which caused an economic decline in the area. It was later reopened and the public beach remains popular among people of different classes.

== Geography ==
Boca Chica has two small islands: Los Pinos, which was made with sand from the dredging of the Andrés port in the 1950s, and La Matica y La Piedra, which are cays with mangroves, submerged vascular plants, and habitat for various species of birds. The beach has a natural breakwater, as well as a fresh water spring, coming from the Brujuelas underground river.

== Characteristics ==
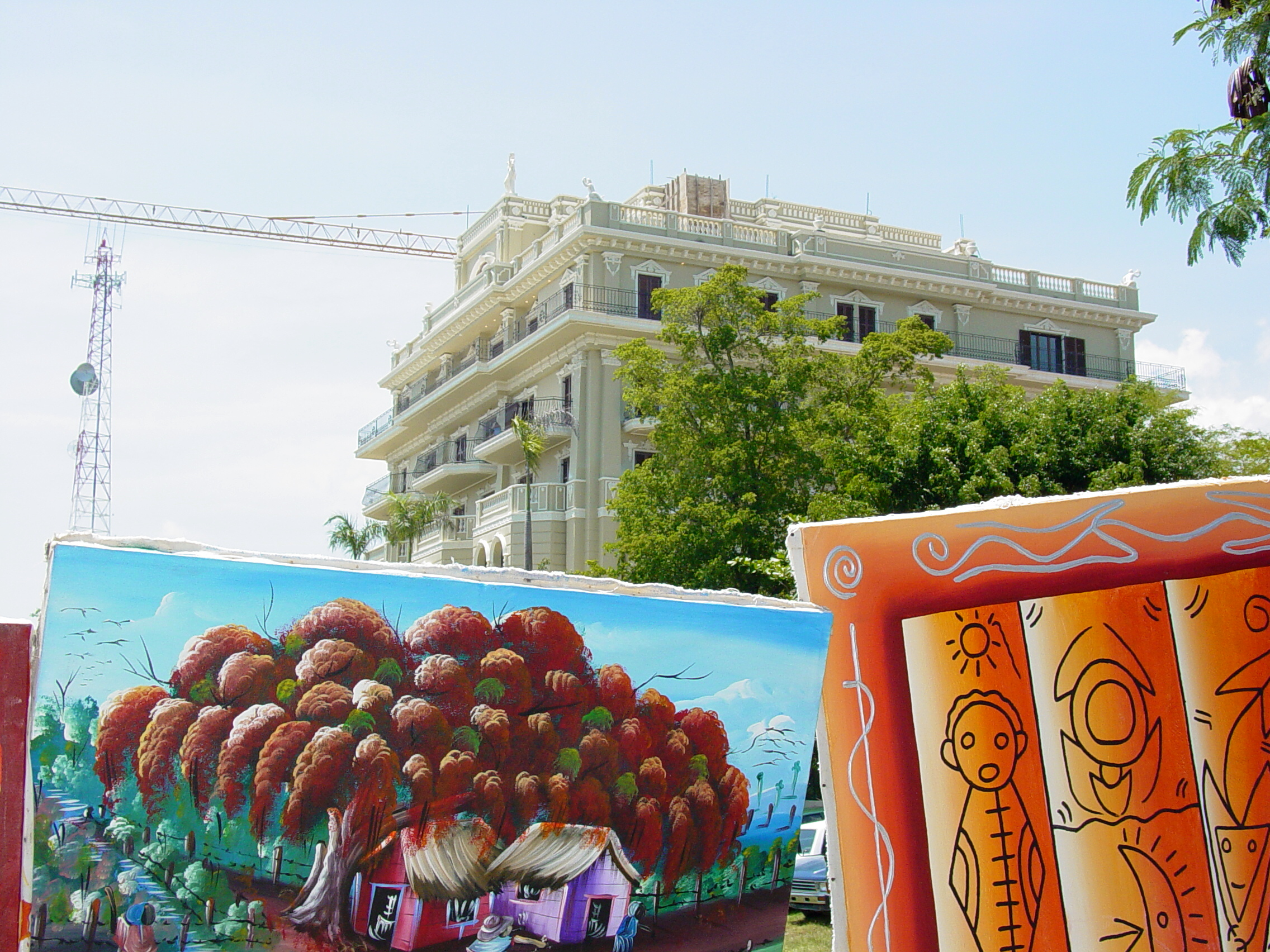
Villa Florencia hotel in Boca Chica, Dominican Republic

The short distance of 31 kilometres (19 mi) from Santo Domingo, the crystalline waters and the white sands means that the beaches of Boca Chica are often busy, especially on weekends and holidays. Boca Chica beach has fine sand and minimal change in the elevation of the seafloor, with waist-height water.

There are several small stores, bars, seaside restaurants, pizza stands, and souvenir stalls, as well as music throughout most of the day. In the evening, Boca Chica transforms itself into a town of party bars.

== Notable people ==
- Cristian Javier, Houston Astros pitcher
- Jeurys Familia, New York Mets pitcher
- Elvis Luciano, MLB pitcher for the Toronto Blue Jays
