= Nathalia Alfaro =

Costa Rican beach volleyball player

Personal information
- Full name: Nathalia Alfaro Paniagua
- Nickname: Nathy
- Born: April 8, 1987 (age 39); Heredia, Costa Rica
- Hometown: Heredia, Costa Rica
- Height: 165 cm (5 ft 5 in)
- Weight: 59 kg (130 lb)

Beach volleyball information

Current teammate
Years	Teammate
2015	Karen Cope

Previous teammates
Years	Teammate
2005–2013	Ingrid Morales
Honours
Women's beach volleyball
Representing Costa Rica
NORCECA Beach Volleyball Circuit
Silver medal – second place	2008 Boca Chica	Beach
Silver medal – second place	2009 Boca Chica	Beach
Bronze medal – third place	2009 Kingston	Beach
Bronze medal – third place	2009 Guatemala City	Beach
- Last updated: June 2015

Nathalia Alfaro Paniagua (Note: In this Spanish name, the first or paternal surname is Alfaro and the second or maternal family name is Paniagua.) (born April 8, 1987, in Heredia) is a beach volleyball player from Costa Rica, who played in the Swatch FIVB World Tour 2005 at the Acapulco step, playing with Ingrid Morales.

Representing her native country during the 2006 Central American and Caribbean Games playing with Yanina Aguilar and the 2007 Pan American Games with Ingrid Morales, she finished eighth and ninth.

Playing in Puerto Vallarta with Ingrid Morales, they won the 2008 Torneo Internacional de Voleibol de Playa de Puerto Vallarta.

She won the silver medal at the NORCECA Beach Volleyball Circuit 2008 and 2009 at Santo Domingo, Dominican Republic.

In her home country, she has won five consecutive beach volleyball championships, from 2005 to 2009.

She played Indoor Volleyball with her National Team at the 2007 NORCECA Championship.
