= María José Orellana =

Guatemalan beach volleyball player (born 1981)

María Orellana

Personal information
- Full name: María José Orellana Aragon
- Nickname: Majo
- Nationality: Guatemala
- Born: April 8, 1981 (age 45); Guatemala
- Height: 164 cm (5 ft 5 in)
- Weight: 56 kg (123 lb)

Beach volleyball information

Current teammate
Years	Teammate	Tours (points)
2009	Anna Ramírez	265

María José Orellana Aragon (born April 8, 1981) is a female beach volleyball player from Guatemala, who played in the 2003 and 2007 Pan American Games playing with Sylvana Gómez and Anna Ramírez, finishing 5th and 9th.

Representing her native country during the 2006 Central American and Caribbean Games playing with Anna Ramírez, they finished in the 7th. position.

She has participated in many tournaments at the NORCECA Beach Volleyball Circuit.

She won the National Championship 2009, playing with Anna Ramírez.

She played Indoor Volleyball with her National Team at the 2006 World Championship qualifier. She acted as team captain, and finished 4th, not qualifying to the main event.
