= Marcelo Araya =

Chilean police officer

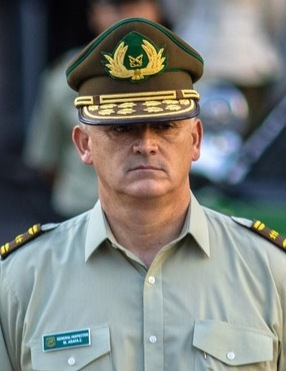

Marcelo Araya is a Chilean police officer. He has served as general director of Carabineros de Chile since 2024.
