= 2022 Beach Volleyball World Championships – Men's tournament =

Tournament details
- Host country: Italy
- City: Rome
- Dates: 10–19 June
- Teams: 48 (from 5 confederations)
- Venue: Foro Italico (3 courts)

Final positions
- Champions: Norway; Anders Mol; Christian Sørum (1st title)
- Runners-up: Brazil; Renato Carvalho; Vitor Felipe
- Third place: Brazil; André Stein; George Wanderley
- Fourth place: United States; Chaim Schalk; Theodore Brunner

The men's tournament of the 2022 Beach Volleyball World Championships was held from 10 to 19 June 2022.

== Qualification ==
There are 48 teams qualified for the tournament.

== Schedule ==
The 48 teams are split into twelve pools, where the first two and the four best-third placed teams advance to the knockout stage. The remaining eight third-ranked teams play in a lucky loser round to determine the last four teams. After that, a knockout system will be used.

P	Preliminary round	LL	Lucky losers playoffs	1/16	Round of 32	1/8	Round of 16	1/4	Quarter-finals	1/2	Semi-finals	B	Bronze medal match	F	Final

Fri 10	Sat 11	Sun 12	Mon 13	Tue 14	Wed 15	Thu 16	Fri 17	Sat 18	Sun 19	
P	P	P	P	LL	1/16	1/8	1/4	1/2	B	F

== Preliminary round ==
The draw was held on 21 May 2022. If two teams are tied in points, the overall set and points ratio will be used. If three teams are tied on points, the matches against those teams determine the ranking.

All times are local (UTC+2).

=== Pool A ===
Pos	Team	Pld	W	L	Pts	SW	SL	SR	SPW	SPL	SPR	Qualification
1	(Italy) Carambula – Rossi	3	3	0	6	6	1	6.000	142	117	1.214	Round of 32
2	(Brazil) Bruno Schmidt – Saymon	3	2	1	5	5	2	2.500	140	124	1.129	Round of 32
3	(Argentina) N. Capogrosso – T. Capogrosso	3	1	2	4	2	4	0.500	102	111	0.919	Lucky loser playoffs
4	(The Gambia) Jawo – Jarra	3	0	3	3	0	6	0.000	94	126	0.746	

Source: FIVB

10 June 2022; 17:00	Bruno Schmidt – Saymon (Brazil)	2–0	(Argentina) N. Capogrosso – T. Capogrosso	Court 3 Referees: Carlos Rivera (PUR), Giuseppe Curto (ITA)
10 June 2022; 17:00	(21–16, 21–16); Report			Court 3 Referees: Carlos Rivera (PUR), Giuseppe Curto (ITA)

10 June 2022; 19:00	Carambula – Rossi (Italy)	2–0	(The Gambia) Jawo – Jarra	Center court Referees: Osvaldo Sumavil (ARG), Vincent Roche (FRA)
10 June 2022; 19:00	(21–18, 21–15); Report			Center court Referees: Osvaldo Sumavil (ARG), Vincent Roche (FRA)

11 June 2022; 19:00	Bruno Schmidt – Saymon (Brazil)	2–0	(The Gambia) Jawo – Jarra	Court 2 Referees: Vincent Roche (FRA), Rui Carvalho (POR)
11 June 2022; 19:00	(21–18, 21–17); Report			Court 2 Referees: Vincent Roche (FRA), Rui Carvalho (POR)

11 June 2022; 21:00	Carambula – Rossi (Italy)	2–0	(Argentina) N. Capogrosso – T. Capogrosso	Center court Referees: Rui Carvalho (POR), Brigham Beatie (USA)
11 June 2022; 21:00	(21–18, 22–20); Report			Center court Referees: Rui Carvalho (POR), Brigham Beatie (USA)

13 June 2022; 16:00	Carambula – Rossi (Italy)	2–1	(Brazil) Bruno Schmidt – Saymon	Center court Referees: Nina Hobi (AUT), Brigham Beatie (USA)
13 June 2022; 16:00	(18–21, 21–19, 18–16); Report			Center court Referees: Nina Hobi (AUT), Brigham Beatie (USA)

13 June 2022; 16:00	N. Capogrosso – T. Capogrosso (Argentina)	2–0	(The Gambia) Jawo – Jarra	Court 2 Referees: Carlos Rivera (PUR), Vincent Roche (FRA)
13 June 2022; 16:00	(21–12, 21–14); Report			Court 2 Referees: Carlos Rivera (PUR), Vincent Roche (FRA)

=== Pool B ===
Pos	Team	Pld	W	L	Pts	SW	SL	SR	SPW	SPL	SPR	Qualification
1	(Italy) Lupo – Ranghieri	3	2	1	5	5	3	1.667	158	148	1.068	Round of 32
2	(Netherlands) Varenhorst – Van de Velde (Note: Varenhorst and Van de Velde replaced Paul Akan and Samuel Essilfie who withdrew.)	3	2	1	5	5	3	1.667	142	134	1.060	Round of 32
3	(Canada) Schachter – Dearing	3	1	2	4	3	5	0.600	141	148	0.953	Lucky loser playoffs
4	(Poland) Bryl – Łosiak	3	1	2	4	2	4	0.500	124	135	0.919	

Source: FIVB
Notes:

10 June 2022; 18:00	Bryl – Łosiak (Poland)	0–2	(Netherlands) Varenhorst – Van de Velde	Court 3 Referees: Amantino Giseli (BRA), Charalampos Papadogoulas (GRE)
10 June 2022; 18:00	(21–23, 13–21); Report			Court 3 Referees: Amantino Giseli (BRA), Charalampos Papadogoulas (GRE)

10 June 2022; 20:00	Lupo – Ranghieri (Italy)	2–1	(Canada) Schachter – Dearing	Center court Referees: Robert Leko (SRB), Maarten Ghysel (BEL)
10 June 2022; 20:00	(20–22, 21–18, 15–12); Report			Center court Referees: Robert Leko (SRB), Maarten Ghysel (BEL)

11 June 2022; 19:00	Bryl – Łosiak (Poland)	2–0	(Canada) Schachter – Dearing	Court 3 Referees: Davide Crescentini (ITA), Maarten Ghysel (BEL)
11 June 2022; 19:00	(25–23, 21–19); Report			Court 3 Referees: Davide Crescentini (ITA), Maarten Ghysel (BEL)

11 June 2022; 22:00	Lupo – Ranghieri (Italy)	1–2	(Netherlands) Varenhorst – Van de Velde	Center court Referees: Carlos Rivera (PUR), Giseli Amantino (BRA)
11 June 2022; 22:00	(21–16, 20–22, 12–15); Report			Center court Referees: Carlos Rivera (PUR), Giseli Amantino (BRA)

13 June 2022; 12:00	Bryl – Łosiak (Poland)	0–2	(Italy) Lupo – Ranghieri	Center court Referees: Brigham Beatie (USA), Giovanni Bake (RSA)
13 June 2022; 12:00	(26–28, 18–21); Report			Center court Referees: Brigham Beatie (USA), Giovanni Bake (RSA)

13 June 2022; 12:00	Schachter – Dearing (Canada)	2–1	(Netherlands) Varenhorst – Van de Velde	Court 2 Referees: Juan Saavedra (COL), Giuseppe Curto (ITA)
13 June 2022; 12:00	(21–16, 11–21, 15–9); Report			Court 2 Referees: Juan Saavedra (COL), Giuseppe Curto (ITA)

=== Pool C ===
Pos	Team	Pld	W	L	Pts	SW	SL	SR	SPW	SPL	SPR	Qualification
1	(Estonia) Nõlvak – Tiisaar	3	3	0	6	6	2	3.000	150	127	1.181	Round of 32
2	(Netherlands) Brouwer – Meeuwsen	3	2	1	5	5	2	2.500	133	96	1.385	Round of 32
3	(Mexico) Virgen – Sarabia	3	1	2	4	3	4	0.750	119	134	0.888	Lucky loser playoffs
4	(Morocco) Abicha – El Gharouti	3	0	3	3	0	6	0.000	81	126	0.643	

Source: FIVB

10 June 2022; 09:00	Brouwer – Meeuwsen (Netherlands)	2–0	(Morocco) Abicha – El Gharouti	Court 3 Referees: Giovanni Bake (RSA), Carlos Rivera (PUR)
10 June 2022; 09:00	(21–11, 21–9); Report			Court 3 Referees: Giovanni Bake (RSA), Carlos Rivera (PUR)

10 June 2022; 10:00	Nõlvak – Tiisaar (Estonia)	2–1	(Mexico) Virgen – Sarabia	Court 3 Referees: Osvaldo Sumavil (ARG), Rui Carvalho (POR)
10 June 2022; 10:00	(21–12, 24–26, 15–11); Report			Court 3 Referees: Osvaldo Sumavil (ARG), Rui Carvalho (POR)

11 June 2022; 11:00	Brouwer – Meeuwsen (Netherlands)	2–0	(Mexico) Virgen – Sarabia	Court 3 Referees: Carlos Rivera (PUR), Giseli Amantino (BRA)
11 June 2022; 11:00	(21–13, 21–15); Report			Court 3 Referees: Carlos Rivera (PUR), Giseli Amantino (BRA)

11 June 2022; 11:00	Nõlvak – Tiisaar (Estonia)	2–0	(Morocco) Abicha – El Gharouti	Court 2 Referees: Robert Leko (SRB), Vincent Roche (FRA)
11 June 2022; 11:00	(21–13, 21–16); Report			Court 2 Referees: Robert Leko (SRB), Vincent Roche (FRA)

13 June 2022; 09:00	Brouwer – Meeuwsen (Netherlands)	1–2	(Estonia) Nõlvak – Tiisaar	Court 2 Referees: Vincent Roche (FRA), Juan Saavedra (COL)
13 June 2022; 09:00	(16–21, 21–12, 12–15); Report			Court 2 Referees: Vincent Roche (FRA), Juan Saavedra (COL)

13 June 2022; 09:00	Virgen – Sarabia (Mexico)	2–0	(Morocco) Abicha – El Gharouti	Court 3 Referees: Davide Crescentini (ITA), Robert Leko(SRB)
13 June 2022; 09:00	(21–17, 21–15); Report			Court 3 Referees: Davide Crescentini (ITA), Robert Leko(SRB)

=== Pool D ===
Pos	Team	Pld	W	L	Pts	SW	SL	SR	SPW	SPL	SPR	Qualification
1	(Qatar) Cherif – Ahmed	3	3	0	6	6	0	MAX	126	87	1.448	Round of 32
2	(United States) Sander – Crabb	3	2	1	5	4	3	1.333	127	132	0.962	Round of 32
3	(France) Krou – Gauthier-Rat	3	1	2	4	3	4	0.750	128	127	1.008	Lucky loser playoffs
4	(Paraguay) Gonzalo – Roger	3	0	3	3	0	6	0.000	91	126	0.722	

Source: FIVB

10 June 2022; 11:00	Cherif – Ahmed (Qatar)	2–0	(Paraguay) Gonzalo – Roger	Court 3 Referees: Charalampos Papadogoulas (GRE), Giovanni Bake (RSA)
10 June 2022; 11:00	(21–13, 21–12); Report			Court 3 Referees: Charalampos Papadogoulas (GRE), Giovanni Bake (RSA)

10 June 2022; 12:00	Krou – Gauthier-Rat (France)	1–2	(United States) Sander – Crabb	Center court Referees: Maarten Ghysel (BEL), Davide Crescentini (ITA)
10 June 2022; 12:00	(18–21, 22–20, 13–15); Report			Center court Referees: Maarten Ghysel (BEL), Davide Crescentini (ITA)

11 June 2022; 12:00	Cherif – Ahmed (Qatar)	2–0	(United States) Sander – Crabb	Center court Referees: Davide Crescentini (ITA), Agnieszka Myszkowska (POL)
11 June 2022; 12:00	(21–14, 21–15); Report			Center court Referees: Davide Crescentini (ITA), Agnieszka Myszkowska (POL)

11 June 2022; 12:00	Krou – Gauthier-Rat (France)	2–0	(Paraguay) Gonzalo – Roger	Court 2 Referees: Rui Carvalho (POR), Osvaldo Sumavil (ARG)
11 June 2022; 12:00	(21–13, 21–16); Report			Court 2 Referees: Rui Carvalho (POR), Osvaldo Sumavil (ARG)

13 June 2022; 14:00	Cherif – Ahmed (Qatar)	2–0	(France) Krou – Gauthier-Rat	Center court Referees: Giovanni Bake (RSA), Nina Hobi (AUT)
13 June 2022; 14:00	(21–17, 21–16); Report			Center court Referees: Giovanni Bake (RSA), Nina Hobi (AUT)

13 June 2022; 14:00	Sander – Crabb (United States)	2–0	(Paraguay) Gonzalo – Roger	Court 2 Referees: Vincent Roche (FRA), Juan Saavedra (COL)
13 June 2022; 14:00	(21–19, 21–18); Report			Court 2 Referees: Vincent Roche (FRA), Juan Saavedra (COL)

=== Pool E ===
Pos	Team	Pld	W	L	Pts	SW	SL	SR	SPW	SPL	SPR	Qualification
1	(Brazil) André – George	3	3	0	6	6	2	3.000	155	130	1.192	Round of 32
2	(Latvia) Samoilovs – Šmēdiņš	3	2	1	5	4	3	1.333	131	127	1.031	Round of 32
3	(Austria) Huber – Dressler	3	1	2	4	3	4	0.750	129	130	0.992	Lucky loser playoffs
4	(Iran) Salemi – Vakili	3	0	3	3	2	6	0.333	127	155	0.819	

Source: FIVB

10 June 2022; 15:00	André – George (Brazil)	2–1	(Iran) Salemi – Vakili	Court 3 Referees: Giuseppe Curto (ITA), Rui Carvalho (POR)
10 June 2022; 15:00	(19–21, 21–14, 15–10); Report			Court 3 Referees: Giuseppe Curto (ITA), Rui Carvalho (POR)

10 June 2022; 16:00	Samoilovs – Šmēdiņš (Latvia)	2–0	(Austria) Huber – Dressler	Court 3 Referees: Charalampos Papadogoulas (GRE), Giovanni Bake (RSA)
10 June 2022; 16:00	(21–17, 21–16); Report			Court 3 Referees: Charalampos Papadogoulas (GRE), Giovanni Bake (RSA)

11 June 2022; 14:00	André – George (Brazil)	2–1	(Austria) Huber – Dressler	Center court Referees: Agnieszka Myszkowska (POL), Giovanni Bake (RSA)
11 June 2022; 14:00	(22–20, 21–23, 15–11); Report			Center court Referees: Agnieszka Myszkowska (POL), Giovanni Bake (RSA)

11 June 2022; 14:00	Samoilovs – Šmēdiņš (Latvia)	2–1	(Iran) Salemi – Vakili	Court 2 Referees: Vincent Roche (FRA), Rui Carvalho (POR)
11 June 2022; 14:00	22–24, 21–15, 15–13; Report			Court 2 Referees: Vincent Roche (FRA), Rui Carvalho (POR)

13 June 2022; 15:00	André – George (Brazil)	2–0	(Latvia) Samoilovs – Šmēdiņš	Center court Referees: Maarten Ghysel (BEL), Agnieszka Myszkowska (POL)
13 June 2022; 15:00	(21–15, 21–16); Report			Center court Referees: Maarten Ghysel (BEL), Agnieszka Myszkowska (POL)

13 June 2022; 15:00	Huber – Dressler (Austria)	2–0	(Iran) Salemi – Vakili	Court 2 Referees: Giuseppe Curto (ITA), Giseli Amantino (BRA)
13 June 2022; 15:00	(21–14, 21–16); Report			Court 2 Referees: Giuseppe Curto (ITA), Giseli Amantino (BRA)

=== Pool F ===
Pos	Team	Pld	W	L	Pts	SW	SL	SR	SPW	SPL	SPR	Qualification
1	(Czech Republic) Perušič – Schweiner	3	3	0	6	6	1	6.000	138	101	1.366	Round of 32
2	(Norway) Berntsen – H. Mol	3	2	1	5	4	3	1.333	129	129	1.000	Round of 32
3	(United States) Schalk – Brunner	3	1	2	4	4	4	1.000	138	138	1.000	Round of 32
4	(Mozambique) Martinho – Monjane	3	0	3	3	0	6	0.000	89	126	0.706	

Source: FIVB

10 June 2022; 13:00	Perušič – Schweiner (Czech Republic)	2–0	(Mozambique) Martinho – Monjane	Court 3 Referees: Rui Carvalho (POR), Charalampos Papadogoulas (GRE)
10 June 2022; 13:00	(21–15, 21–12); Report			Court 3 Referees: Rui Carvalho (POR), Charalampos Papadogoulas (GRE)

10 June 2022; 14:00	Schalk – Brunner (United States)	1–2	(Norway) Berntsen – H. Mol	Court 3 Referees: Giovanni Bake (RSA), Carlos Rivera (PUR)
10 June 2022; 14:00	(23–21, 17–21, 12–15); Report			Court 3 Referees: Giovanni Bake (RSA), Carlos Rivera (PUR)

11 June 2022; 13:00	Perušič – Schweiner (Czech Republic)	2–0	(Norway) Berntsen – H. Mol	Center court Referees: Juan Saavedra (COL), Giuseppe Curto (ITA)
11 June 2022; 13:00	(21–13, 21–17); Report			Center court Referees: Juan Saavedra (COL), Giuseppe Curto (ITA)

11 June 2022; 13:00	Schalk – Brunner (United States)	2–0	(Mozambique) Martinho – Monjane	Court 2 Referees: Charalampos Papadogoulas (GRE), Robert Leko (SRB)
11 June 2022; 13:00	(21–12, 21–15); Report			Court 2 Referees: Charalampos Papadogoulas (GRE), Robert Leko (SRB)

13 June 2022; 17:00	Perušič – Schweiner (Czech Republic)	2–1	(United States) Schalk – Brunner	Court 2 Referees: Juan Saavedra (COL), Giuseppe Curto (ITA)
13 June 2022; 17:00	(21–17, 18–21, 15–6); Report			Court 2 Referees: Juan Saavedra (COL), Giuseppe Curto (ITA)

13 June 2022; 17:00	Berntsen – H. Mol (Norway)	2–0	(Mozambique) Martinho – Monjane	Court 3 Referees: Robert Leko (SRB), Mariko Satomi (JPN)
13 June 2022; 17:00	(21–18, 21–17); Report			Court 3 Referees: Robert Leko (SRB), Mariko Satomi (JPN)

=== Pool G ===
Pos	Team	Pld	W	L	Pts	SW	SL	SR	SPW	SPL	SPR	Qualification
1	(Austria) Ermacora – Pristauz	3	2	1	5	5	3	1.667	146	136	1.074	Round of 32
2	(Spain) Herrera – Gavira	3	2	1	5	4	2	2.000	126	113	1.115	Round of 32
3	(Netherlands) Immers – Boermans (Note: Immers replaced Yorick de Groot.)	3	2	1	5	4	3	1.333	133	135	0.985	Round of 32
4	(China) Wu – Halikejiang	3	0	3	3	1	6	0.167	119	140	0.850	

Source: FIVB
Notes:

11 June 2022; 09:00	Immers – Boermans (Netherlands)	2–0	(China) Wu – Halikejiang	Court 3 Referees: Giseli Amantino (BRA), Maarten Ghysel (BEL)
11 June 2022; 09:00	(22–20, 21–19); Report			Court 3 Referees: Giseli Amantino (BRA), Maarten Ghysel (BEL)

11 June 2022; 09:00	Ermacora – Pristauz (Austria)	2–0	(Spain) Herrera – Gavira	Court 2 Referees: Vincent Roche (FRA), Rui Carvalho (POR)
11 June 2022; 09:00	(23–21, 21–14); Report			Court 2 Referees: Vincent Roche (FRA), Rui Carvalho (POR)

12 June 2022; 09:00	Ermacora – Pristauz (Austria)	2–1	(China) Wu – Halikejiang	Court 3 Referees: Brigham Beatie (USA), Giuseppe Curto (ITA)
12 June 2022; 09:00	(19–21, 21–19, 15–13); Report			Court 3 Referees: Brigham Beatie (USA), Giuseppe Curto (ITA)

12 June 2022; 10:00	Immers – Boermans (Netherlands)	0–2	(Spain) Herrera – Gavira	Center court Referees: Vincent Roche (FRA), Charalampos Papadogoulas (GRE)
12 June 2022; 10:00	(26–28, 16–21); Report			Center court Referees: Vincent Roche (FRA), Charalampos Papadogoulas (GRE)

13 June 2022; 18:00	Immers – Boermans (Netherlands)	2–1	(Austria) Ermacora – Pristauz	Court 3 Referees: Rui Carvalho (POR), Charalampos Papadogoulas (GRE)
13 June 2022; 18:00	(21–18, 12–21, 15–8); Report			Court 3 Referees: Rui Carvalho (POR), Charalampos Papadogoulas (GRE)

13 June 2022; 18:00	Herrera – Gavira (Spain)	2–0	(China) Wu – Halikejiang	Court 2 Referees: Giseli Amantino (BRA), Carlos Rivera (PUR)
13 June 2022; 18:00	(21–12, 21–15); Report			Court 2 Referees: Giseli Amantino (BRA), Carlos Rivera (PUR)

=== Pool H ===
Pos	Team	Pld	W	L	Pts	SW	SL	SR	SPW	SPL	SPR	Qualification
1	(Norway) A. Mol – Sørum	3	3	0	6	6	0	MAX	126	79	1.595	Round of 32
2	(Netherlands) Luini – Penninga	3	2	1	5	4	2	2.000	112	114	0.982	Round of 32
3	(Italy) Benzi – Bonifazi	3	1	2	4	2	4	0.500	99	118	0.839	Lucky loser playoffs
4	(Chile) Aravena – Droguett	3	0	3	3	0	6	0.000	100	126	0.794	

Source: FIVB

11 June 2022; 18:00	Aravena – Droguett (Chile)	0–2	(Netherlands) Luini – Penninga	Court 3 Referees: Giuseppe Curto (ITA), Carlos Rivera (PUR)
11 June 2022; 18:00	(17–21, 19–21); Report			Court 3 Referees: Giuseppe Curto (ITA), Carlos Rivera (PUR)

11 June 2022; 20:00	A. Mol – Sørum (Norway)	2–0	(Italy) Benzi – Bonifazi	Center court Referees: Agnieszka Myszkowska (POL), Giovanni Bake (RSA)
11 June 2022; 20:00	(21–11, 21–10); Report			Center court Referees: Agnieszka Myszkowska (POL), Giovanni Bake (RSA)

12 June 2022; 18:00	Aravena – Droguett (Chile)	0–2	(Italy) Benzi – Bonifazi	Center court Referees: Charalampos Papadogoulas (GRE), Carlos Rivera (PUR)
12 June 2022; 18:00	(18–21, 15–21); Report			Center court Referees: Charalampos Papadogoulas (GRE), Carlos Rivera (PUR)

12 June 2022; 19:00	A. Mol – Sørum (Norway)	2–0	(Netherlands) Luini – Penninga	Center court Referees: Rui Carvalho (POR), Robert Leko (SRB)
12 June 2022; 19:00	(21–10, 21–17); Report			Center court Referees: Rui Carvalho (POR), Robert Leko (SRB)

13 June 2022; 10:00	A. Mol – Sørum (Norway)	2–0	(Chile) Aravena – Droguett	Court 2 Referees: Giuseppe Curto (ITA), Agnieszka Myszkowska (POL)
13 June 2022; 10:00	(21–13, 21–18); Report			Court 2 Referees: Giuseppe Curto (ITA), Agnieszka Myszkowska (POL)

13 June 2022; 10:00	Luini – Penninga (Netherlands)	2–0	(Italy) Benzi – Bonifazi	Center court Referees: Nina Hobi (AUT), Brigham Beatie (USA)
13 June 2022; 10:00	(21–16, 22–20); Report			Center court Referees: Nina Hobi (AUT), Brigham Beatie (USA)

=== Pool I ===
Pos	Team	Pld	W	L	Pts	SW	SL	SR	SPW	SPL	SPR	Qualification
1	(Austria) Seidl – Waller	3	3	0	6	6	1	6.000	141	112	1.259	Round of 32
2	(Poland) Kantor – Rudol	3	1	2	4	2	5	0.400	123	131	0.939	Round of 32
3	(Chile) M. Grimalt – E. Grimalt	3	1	2	4	3	4	0.750	127	132	0.962	Lucky loser playoffs
4	(Italy) Windisch – Dal Corso	3	1	2	4	3	4	0.750	123	139	0.885	

Source: FIVB

11 June 2022; 17:00	M. Grimalt – E. Grimalt (Chile)	0–2	(Italy) Windisch – Dal Corso	Center court Referees: Brigham Beatie (USA), Juan Saavedra (COL)
11 June 2022; 17:00	(17–21, 18–21)			Center court Referees: Brigham Beatie (USA), Juan Saavedra (COL)

11 June 2022; 17:00	Seidl – Waller (Austria)	2–0	(Poland) Kantor – Rudol	Court 2 Referees: Rui Carvalho (POR), Osvaldo Sumavil (ARG)
11 June 2022; 17:00	(21–15, 21–14); Report			Court 2 Referees: Rui Carvalho (POR), Osvaldo Sumavil (ARG)

12 June 2022; 13:00	M. Grimalt – E. Grimalt (Chile)	2–0	(Poland) Kantor – Rudol	Court 3 Referees: Giseli Amantino (BRA), Juan Saavedra (COL)
12 June 2022; 13:00	(22–20, 21–16); Report			Court 3 Referees: Giseli Amantino (BRA), Juan Saavedra (COL)

12 June 2022; 17:00	Seidl – Waller (Austria)	2–0	(Italy) Windisch – Dal Corso	Center court Referees: Osvaldo Sumavil (ARG), Rui Carvalho (POR)
12 June 2022; 17:00	(21–13, 24–22)			Center court Referees: Osvaldo Sumavil (ARG), Rui Carvalho (POR)

13 June 2022; 11:00	M. Grimalt – E. Grimalt (Chile)	1–2	(Austria) Seidl – Waller	Court 2 Referees: Carlos Rivera (PUR), Vincent Roche (FRA)
13 June 2022; 11:00	(21–18, 15–21, 12–15); Report			Court 2 Referees: Carlos Rivera (PUR), Vincent Roche (FRA)

13 June 2022; 11:00	Kantor – Rudol (Poland)	2–1	(Italy) Windisch – Dal Corso	Center court Referees: Giseli Amantino (BRA), Osvaldo Sumavil (ARG)
13 June 2022; 11:00	(22–24, 21–13, 15–9); Report			Center court Referees: Giseli Amantino (BRA), Osvaldo Sumavil (ARG)

=== Pool J ===
Pos	Team	Pld	W	L	Pts	SW	SL	SR	SPW	SPL	SPR	Qualification
1	(Germany) Ehlers – Wickler	3	2	1	5	5	3	1.667	149	139	1.072	Round of 32
2	(Cuba) Díaz – Alayo	3	2	1	5	4	4	1.000	153	154	0.994	Round of 32
3	(Australia) McHugh – Burnett	3	1	2	4	3	4	0.750	132	126	1.048	Round of 32
4	(Uruguay) Hannibal – Cairus	3	1	2	4	4	5	0.800	157	172	0.913	

Source: FIVB

11 June 2022; 15:00	McHugh – Burnett (Australia)	2–0	(Cuba) Díaz – Alayo	Court 2 Referees: Osvaldo Sumavil (ARG), Charalampos Papadogoulas (GRE)
11 June 2022; 15:00	(21–15, 21–18); Report			Court 2 Referees: Osvaldo Sumavil (ARG), Charalampos Papadogoulas (GRE)

11 June 2022; 15:00	Ehlers – Wickler (Germany)	2–1	(Uruguay) Hannibal – Cairus	Court 3 Referees: Mariko Satomi (JPN), Nina Hobi (AUT)
11 June 2022; 15:00	(19–21, 21–17, 15–8); Report			Court 3 Referees: Mariko Satomi (JPN), Nina Hobi (AUT)

12 June 2022; 14:00	McHugh – Burnett (Australia)	1–2	(Uruguay) Hannibal – Cairus	Court 3 Referees: Brigham Beatie (USA), Giuseppe Curto (ITA)
12 June 2022; 14:00	(19–21, 21–15, 13–15); Report			Court 3 Referees: Brigham Beatie (USA), Giuseppe Curto (ITA)

12 June 2022; 16:00	Ehlers – Wickler (Germany)	1–2	(Cuba) Díaz – Alayo	Court 3 Referees: Juan Saavedra (COL), Brigham Beatie (USA)
12 June 2022; 16:00	(21–18, 21–23, 10–15); Report			Court 3 Referees: Juan Saavedra (COL), Brigham Beatie (USA)

13 June 2022; 19:00	Hannibal – Cairus (Uruguay)	2–1	(Cuba) Díaz – Alayo	Court 2 Referees: Vincent Roche (FRA), Maarten Ghysel (BEL)
13 June 2022; 19:00	(30–28, 19–21, 11–15); Report			Court 2 Referees: Vincent Roche (FRA), Maarten Ghysel (BEL)

13 June 2022; 20:00	McHugh – Burnett (Australia)	0–2	(Germany) Ehlers – Wickler	Center court Referees: Giuseppe Curto (ITA), Charalampos Papadogoulas (GRE)
13 June 2022; 20:00	(19–21, 18–21); Report			Center court Referees: Giuseppe Curto (ITA), Charalampos Papadogoulas (GRE)

=== Pool K ===
Pos	Team	Pld	W	L	Pts	SW	SL	SR	SPW	SPL	SPR	Qualification
1	(Italy) Nicolai – Cottafava	3	3	0	6	6	0	MAX	126	77	1.636	Round of 32
2	(United States) Crabb – Bourne (Note: Crabb and Bourne replaced David Åhman and Jonatan Hellvig who withdrew due to an injury.)	3	2	1	5	4	2	2.000	114	100	1.140	Round of 32
3	(Thailand) Surin – Banlue	3	1	2	4	2	4	0.500	94	125	0.752	Lucky loser playoffs
4	(Colombia) Murray – Rivas	3	0	3	3	0	6	0.000	99	131	0.756	

Source: FIVB
Notes:

11 June 2022; 18:00	Crabb – Bourne (United States)	2–0	(Thailand) Surin – Banlue	Court 2 Referees: Charalampos Papadogoulas (GRE), Robert Leko (SRB)
11 June 2022; 18:00	(21–8, 21–19); Report			Court 2 Referees: Charalampos Papadogoulas (GRE), Robert Leko (SRB)

11 June 2022; 18:00	Nicolai – Cottafava (Italy)	2–0	(Colombia) Murray – Rivas	Center court Referees: Giseli Amantino (BRA), Agnieszka Myszkowska (POL)
11 June 2022; 18:00	(21–12, 21–15); Report			Center court Referees: Giseli Amantino (BRA), Agnieszka Myszkowska (POL)

12 June 2022; 15:00	Crabb – Bourne (United States)	2–0	(Colombia) Murray – Rivas	Court 3 Referees: Giovanni Bake (RSA), Giseli Amantino (BRA)
12 June 2022; 15:00	(21–14, 21–17); Report			Court 3 Referees: Giovanni Bake (RSA), Giseli Amantino (BRA)

12 June 2022; 20:00	Nicolai – Cottafava (Italy)	2–0	(Thailand) Surin – Banlue	Center court Referees: Brigham Beatie (USA), Giovanni Bake (RSA)
12 June 2022; 20:00	(21–10, 21–10); Report			Center court Referees: Brigham Beatie (USA), Giovanni Bake (RSA)

13 June 2022; 19:00	Murray – Rivas (Colombia)	0–2	(Thailand) Surin – Banlue	Court 3 Referees: Davide Crescentini (ITA), Robert Leko (SRB)
13 June 2022; 19:00	(24–26, 17–21); Report			Court 3 Referees: Davide Crescentini (ITA), Robert Leko (SRB)

13 June 2022; 22:00	Crabb – Bourne (United States)	0–2	(Italy) Nicolai – Cottafava	Center court Referees: Giseli Amantino (BRA), Carlos Rivera (PUR)
13 June 2022; 22:00	(11–21, 19–21); Report			Center court Referees: Giseli Amantino (BRA), Carlos Rivera (PUR)

=== Pool L ===
Pos	Team	Pld	W	L	Pts	SW	SL	SR	SPW	SPL	SPR	Qualification
1	(Australia) Nicolaidis – Carracher	3	2	1	5	5	4	1.250	152	138	1.101	Round of 32
2	(Brazil) Alison – Guto	3	2	1	5	5	3	1.667	149	128	1.164	Round of 32
3	(Brazil) Renato – Vitor Felipe	3	2	1	5	5	3	1.667	137	134	1.022	Round of 32
4	(Nicaragua) Mora – López	3	0	3	3	1	6	0.167	96	134	0.716	

Source: FIVB

11 June 2022; 10:00	Renato – Vitor Felipe (Brazil)	2–0	(Nicaragua) Mora – López	Court 2 Referees: Osvaldo Sumavil (ARG), Charalampos Papadogoulas (GRE)
11 June 2022; 10:00	(21–15, 21–14); Report			Court 2 Referees: Osvaldo Sumavil (ARG), Charalampos Papadogoulas (GRE)

11 June 2022; 10:00	Alison – Guto (Brazil)	2–1	(Australia) Nicolaidis – Carracher	Center court Referees: Giovanni Bake (RSA), Davide Crescentini (ITA)
11 June 2022; 10:00	(19–21, 21–18, 15–10); Report			Center court Referees: Giovanni Bake (RSA), Davide Crescentini (ITA)

12 June 2022; 11:00	Renato – Vitor Felipe (Brazil)	1–2	(Australia) Nicolaidis – Carracher	Court 3 Referees: Juan Saavedra (COL), Brigham Beatie (USA)
12 June 2022; 11:00	(9–21, 21–17, 12–15); Report			Court 3 Referees: Juan Saavedra (COL), Brigham Beatie (USA)

12 June 2022; 12:00	Alison – Guto (Brazil)	2–0	(Nicaragua) Mora – López	Court 3 Referees: Giuseppe Curto (ITA), Giovanni Bake (RSA)
12 June 2022; 12:00	(21–17, 21–9); Report			Court 3 Referees: Giuseppe Curto (ITA), Giovanni Bake (RSA)

13 June 2022; 13:00	Renato – Vitor Felipe (Brazil)	2–1	(Brazil) Alison – Guto	Center court Referees: Osvaldo Sumavil (ARG), Maarten Ghysel (BEL)
13 June 2022; 13:00	(17–21, 21–18, 15–13); Report			Center court Referees: Osvaldo Sumavil (ARG), Maarten Ghysel (BEL)

13 June 2022; 13:00	Nicolaidis – Carracher (Australia)	2–1	(Nicaragua) Mora – López	Court 2 Referees: Agnieszka Myszkowska (POL), Carlos Rivera (PUR)
13 June 2022; 13:00	(21–13, 14–21, 15–7); Report			Court 2 Referees: Agnieszka Myszkowska (POL), Carlos Rivera (PUR)

=== Ranking of third-placed teams ===
Pos	Grp	Team	Pld	W	L	Pts	SW	SL	SR	SPW	SPL	SPR	Qualification
1	L	(Brazil) Renato – Vitor Felipe	3	2	1	5	5	3	1.667	137	134	1.022	Round of 32
2	G	(Netherlands) Immers – Boermans	3	2	1	5	4	3	1.333	133	135	0.985	Round of 32
3	F	(United States) Schalk – Brunner	3	1	2	4	4	4	1.000	138	138	1.000	Round of 32
4	J	(Australia) McHugh – Burnett	3	1	2	4	3	4	0.750	132	126	1.048	Round of 32
5	D	(France) Krou – Gauthier-Rat	3	1	2	4	3	4	0.750	128	127	1.008	Lucky losers playoffs
6	E	(Austria) Huber – Dressler	3	1	2	4	3	4	0.750	129	130	0.992	Lucky losers playoffs
7	I	(Chile) M. Grimalt – E. Grimalt	3	1	2	4	3	4	0.750	127	132	0.962	Lucky losers playoffs
8	C	(Mexico) Virgen – Sarabia	3	1	2	4	3	4	0.750	119	134	0.888	Lucky losers playoffs
9	B	(Canada) Schachter – Dearing	3	1	2	4	3	5	0.600	141	148	0.953	Lucky losers playoffs
10	A	(Argentina) N. Capogrosso – T. Capogrosso	3	1	2	4	2	4	0.500	102	111	0.919	Lucky losers playoffs
11	H	(Italy) Benzi – Bonifazi	3	1	2	4	2	4	0.500	99	118	0.839	Lucky losers playoffs
12	K	(Thailand) Surin – Banlue	3	1	2	4	2	4	0.500	94	125	0.752	Lucky losers playoffs

Source: FIVB

=== Lucky losers playoffs ===
14 June 2022; 19:00	Krou – Gauthier-Rat (France)	2–1	(Thailand) Surin – Banlue	Center court Referees: Juan Saavedra (COL), Carlos Rivera (PUR)
14 June 2022; 19:00	(19–21, 22–20, 16–14); Report			Center court Referees: Juan Saavedra (COL), Carlos Rivera (PUR)

14 June 2022; 20:00	M. Grimalt – E. Grimalt (Chile)	2–1	(Argentina) N. Capogrosso – T. Capogrosso	Center court Referees: Giuseppe Curto (ITA), Maarten Ghysel (BEL)
14 June 2022; 20:00	(21–18, 15–21, 15–11); Report			Center court Referees: Giuseppe Curto (ITA), Maarten Ghysel (BEL)

14 June 2022; 21:00	Huber – Dressler (Austria)	2–1	(Italy) Benzi – Bonifazi	Center court Referees: Charalampos Papadogoulas (GRE), Brigham Beatie (USA)
14 June 2022; 21:00	(21–15, 14–21, 15–13); Report			Center court Referees: Charalampos Papadogoulas (GRE), Brigham Beatie (USA)

14 June 2022; 22:00	Virgen – Sarabia (Mexico)	0–2	(Canada) Schachter – Dearing	Center court Referees: Davide Crescentini (ITA), Robert Leko (SRB)
14 June 2022; 22:00	(17–21, 16–21); Report			Center court Referees: Davide Crescentini (ITA), Robert Leko (SRB)

== Knockout stage ==
=== Bracket ===
Round of 32
15 June
(Italy) Carambula – Rossi	0
(Chile) M. Grimalt – E. Grimalt	2
15 June
(Brazil) Alison – Guto	2
(Spain) Herrera – Gavira	0
15 June
(Austria) Seidl – Waller	2
(United States) Sander – Crabb	1
15 June
(Netherlands) Immers – Boermans	0
(Norway) A. Mol – Sørum	2
15 June
(Brazil) André – George	2
(Australia) McHugh – Burnett	0
15 June
(Norway) Berntsen – H. Mol	0
(Australia) Nicolaidis – Carracher	2
15 June
(Brazil) Bruno Schmidt – Saymon	2
(Latvia) Samoilovs – Šmēdiņš	0
15 June
(Austria) Huber – Dressler	0
(Qatar) Cherif – Ahmed	2
15 June
(Estonia) Nõlvak – Tiisaar	2
(Canada) Schachter – Dearing	0
15 June
(United States) Crabb – Bourne	2
(Netherlands) Luini – Penninga	1
15 June
(Italy) Nicolai – Cottafava	2
(Cuba) Díaz – Alayo	0
15 June
(Brazil) Renato – Vitor Felipe	2
(Czech Republic) Perušič – Schweiner	1
15 June
(Austria) Ermacora – Pristauz	1
(United States) Schalk – Brunner	2
15 June
(Poland) Kantor – Rudol	2
(Germany) Ehlers – Wickler	0
15 June
(Netherlands) Brouwer – Meeuwsen	2
(Netherlands) Varenhorst – Van de Velde	0
15 June
(France) Krou – Gauthier-Rat	0
(Italy) Lupo – Ranghieri	2

Round of 16
16 June
(Chile) M. Grimalt – E. Grimalt	0
(Brazil) Alison – Guto	2
16 June
(Austria) Seidl – Waller	1
(Norway) A. Mol – Sørum	2
16 June
(Brazil) André – George	2
(Australia) Nicolaidis – Carracher	0
16 June
(Brazil) Bruno Schmidt – Saymon	2
(Qatar) Cherif – Ahmed	0
16 June
(Estonia) Nõlvak – Tiisaar	w/o
(United States) Crabb – Bourne
16 June
(Italy) Nicolai – Cottafava	1
(Brazil) Renato – Vitor Felipe	2
16 June
(United States) Schalk – Brunner	2
(Poland) Kantor – Rudol	1
16 June
(Netherlands) Brouwer – Meeuwsen	2
(Italy) Lupo – Ranghieri	0

Quarter-finals
17 June
(Brazil) Alison – Guto	0
(Norway) A. Mol – Sørum	2
17 June
(Brazil) André – George	2
(Brazil) Bruno Schmidt – Saymon	0
17 June
(Estonia) Nõlvak – Tiisaar	0
(Brazil) Renato – Vitor Felipe	2
17 June
(United States) Schalk – Brunner	2
(Netherlands) Brouwer – Meeuwsen	1

Semi-finals
18 June
(Norway) A. Mol – Sørum	2
(Brazil) André – George	0
18 June
(Brazil) Renato – Vitor Felipe	2
(United States) Schalk – Brunner	0

Final
19 June
(Norway) A. Mol – Sørum	2
(Brazil) Renato – Vitor Felipe	0
Third place
19 June
(Brazil) André – George	2
(United States) Schalk – Brunner	1

=== Round of 32 ===
15 June 2022; 09:00	André – George (Brazil)	2–0	(Australia) McHugh – Burnett	Center court Referees: Davide Crescentini (ITA), Giuseppe Curto (ITA)
15 June 2022; 09:00	(21–18, 21–15); Report			Center court Referees: Davide Crescentini (ITA), Giuseppe Curto (ITA)

15 June 2022; 09:00	Berntsen – H. Mol (Norway)	0–2	(Australia) Nicolaidis – Carracher	Court 2 Referees: Carlos Rivera (PUR), Vincent Roche (FRA)
15 June 2022; 09:00	(17–21, 16–21); Report			Court 2 Referees: Carlos Rivera (PUR), Vincent Roche (FRA)

15 June 2022; 10:00	Seidl – Waller (Austria)	2–1	(United States) Sander – Crabb	Court 2 Referees: Juan Saavedra (COL), Giseli Amantino (BRA)
15 June 2022; 10:00	(17–25, 21–15, 15–9); Report			Court 2 Referees: Juan Saavedra (COL), Giseli Amantino (BRA)

15 June 2022; 10:00	Immers – Boermans (Netherlands)	0–2	(Norway) A. Mol – Sørum	Center court Referees: Giovanni Bake (RSA), Agnieszka Myszkowska (POL)
15 June 2022; 10:00	(18–21, 17–21); Report			Center court Referees: Giovanni Bake (RSA), Agnieszka Myszkowska (POL)

15 June 2022; 11:00	Bruno Schmidt – Saymon (Brazil)	2–0	(Latvia) Samoilovs – Šmēdiņš	Center court Referees: Giuseppe Curto (ITA), Brigham Beatie (USA)
15 June 2022; 11:00	(21–19, 29–27); Report			Center court Referees: Giuseppe Curto (ITA), Brigham Beatie (USA)

15 June 2022; 12:00	Kantor – Rudol (Poland)	2–0	(Germany) Ehlers – Wickler	Court 2 Referees: Vincent Roche (FRA), Juan Saavedra (COL)
15 June 2022; 12:00	(21–19, 21–19); Report			Court 2 Referees: Vincent Roche (FRA), Juan Saavedra (COL)

15 June 2022; 13:00	Ermacora – Pristauz (Austria)	1–2	(United States) Schalk – Brunner	Court 2 Referees: Giseli Amantino (BRA), Osvaldo Sumavil (ARG)
15 June 2022; 13:00	(21–17, 18–21, 12–15); Report			Court 2 Referees: Giseli Amantino (BRA), Osvaldo Sumavil (ARG)

15 June 2022; 14:00	Crabb – Bourne (United States)	2–1	(Netherlands) Luini – Penninga	Court 3 Referees: Maarten Ghysel (BEL), Nina Hobi (AUT)
15 June 2022; 14:00	(18–21, 21–19, 15–10); Report			Court 3 Referees: Maarten Ghysel (BEL), Nina Hobi (AUT)

15 June 2022; 14:00	Renato – Vitor Felipe (Brazil)	2–1	(Czech Republic) Perušič – Schweiner	Court 2 Referees: Carlos Rivera (PUR), Vincent Roche (FRA)
15 June 2022; 14:00	(18–21, 21–15, 15–13); Report			Court 2 Referees: Carlos Rivera (PUR), Vincent Roche (FRA)

15 June 2022; 15:00	Brouwer – Meeuwsen (Netherlands)	2–0	(Netherlands) Varenhorst – Van de Velde	Court 2 Referees: Juan Saavedra (COL), Giseli Amantino (BRA)
15 June 2022; 15:00	(21–17, 21–14); Report			Court 2 Referees: Juan Saavedra (COL), Giseli Amantino (BRA)

15 June 2022; 16:00	Alison – Guto (Brazil)	2–0	(Spain) Herrera – Gavira	Court 2 Referees: Osvaldo Sumavil (ARG), Carlos Rivera (PUR)
15 June 2022; 16:00	(21–19, 21–18); Report			Court 2 Referees: Osvaldo Sumavil (ARG), Carlos Rivera (PUR)

15 June 2022; 17:00	Nõlvak – Tiisaar (Estonia)	2–0	(Canada) Schachter – Dearing	Court 3 Referees: Nina Hobi (AUT), Rui Carvalho (POR)
15 June 2022; 17:00	(21–18, 21–16); Report			Court 3 Referees: Nina Hobi (AUT), Rui Carvalho (POR)

15 June 2022; 19:00	Huber – Dressler (Austria)	0–2	(Qatar) Cherif – Ahmed	Court 2 Referees: Brigham Beatie (USA), Giuseppe Curto (ITA)
15 June 2022; 19:00	(15–21, 22–24); Report			Court 2 Referees: Brigham Beatie (USA), Giuseppe Curto (ITA)

15 June 2022; 20:00	Carambula – Rossi (Italy)	0–2	(Chile) M. Grimalt – E. Grimalt	Center court Referees: Charalampos Papadogoulas (GRE), Carlos Rivera (PUR)
15 June 2022; 20:00	(17–21, 18–21); Report			Center court Referees: Charalampos Papadogoulas (GRE), Carlos Rivera (PUR)

15 June 2022; 21:00	Nicolai – Cottafava (Italy)	2–0	(Cuba) Díaz – Alayo	Center court Referees: Maarten Ghysel (BEL), Giseli Amantino (BRA)
15 June 2022; 21:00	(21–18, 21–18); Report			Center court Referees: Maarten Ghysel (BEL), Giseli Amantino (BRA)

15 June 2022; 22:00	Krou – Gauthier-Rat (France)	0–2	(Italy) Lupo – Ranghieri	Center court Referees: Carlos Rivera (PUR), Nina Hobi (AUT)
15 June 2022; 22:00	(18–21, 17–21); Report			Center court Referees: Carlos Rivera (PUR), Nina Hobi (AUT)

=== Round of 16 ===
16 June 2022; 11:00	André – George (Brazil)	2–0	(Australia) Nicolaidis – Carracher	Center court Referees: Robert Leko (SRB), Giuseppe Curto (ITA)
16 June 2022; 11:00	(21–15, 21–15); Report			Center court Referees: Robert Leko (SRB), Giuseppe Curto (ITA)

16 June 2022; 12:15	Schalk – Brunner (United States)	2–1	(Poland) Kantor – Rudol	Court 2 Referees: Maarten Ghysel (BEL), Osvaldo Sumavil (ARG)
16 June 2022; 12:15	(20–22, 21–17, 15–11); Report			Court 2 Referees: Maarten Ghysel (BEL), Osvaldo Sumavil (ARG)

16 June 2022; 13:00	Seidl – Waller (Austria)	1–2	(Norway) A. Mol – Sørum	Center court Referees: Brigham Beatie (USA), Giovanni Bake (RSA)
16 June 2022; 13:00	(21–18, 18–21, 9–15); Report			Center court Referees: Brigham Beatie (USA), Giovanni Bake (RSA)

16 June 2022; 14:00	Nõlvak – Tiisaar (Estonia)	w/o	(United States) Crabb – Bourne	Court 2

The American team had to withdraw after Crabb got ill before the game.

16 June 2022; 19:00	Bruno Schmidt – Saymon (Brazil)	2–0	(Qatar) Cherif – Ahmed	Court 2 Referees: Davide Crescentini (ITA), Rui Carvalho (POR)
16 June 2022; 19:00	(21–19, 21–19); Report			Court 2 Referees: Davide Crescentini (ITA), Rui Carvalho (POR)

16 June 2022; 20:00	M. Grimalt – E. Grimalt (Chile)	0–2	(Brazil) Alison – Guto	Center court Referees: Giuseppe Curto (ITA), Osvaldo Sumavil (ARG)
16 June 2022; 20:00	(22–24, 17–21); Report			Center court Referees: Giuseppe Curto (ITA), Osvaldo Sumavil (ARG)

16 June 2022; 21:00	Nicolai – Cottafava (Italy)	1–2	(Brazil) Renato – Vitor Felipe	Center court Referees: Charalampos Papadogoulas (GRE), Carlos Rivera (PUR)
16 June 2022; 21:00	(21–11, 19–21, 13–15); Report			Center court Referees: Charalampos Papadogoulas (GRE), Carlos Rivera (PUR)

16 June 2022; 22:00	Brouwer – Meeuwsen (Netherlands)	2–0	(Italy) Lupo – Ranghieri	Center court
16 June 2022; 22:00	(21–18, 21–13); Report			Center court

=== Quarterfinals ===
17 June 2022; 13:00	André – George (Brazil)	2–0	(Brazil) Bruno Schmidt – Saymon	Center court Referees: Osvaldo Sumavil (ARG), Agnieszka Myszkowska (POL)
17 June 2022; 13:00	(21–17, 23–21); Report			Center court Referees: Osvaldo Sumavil (ARG), Agnieszka Myszkowska (POL)

17 June 2022; 19:00	Alison – Guto (Brazil)	0–2	(Norway) A. Mol – Sørum	Center court Referees: Charalampos Papadogoulas (GRE), Maarten Ghysel (BEL)
17 June 2022; 19:00	(21–23, 13–21); Report			Center court Referees: Charalampos Papadogoulas (GRE), Maarten Ghysel (BEL)

17 June 2022; 21:00	Nõlvak – Tiisaar (Estonia)	0–2	(Brazil) Renato – Vitor Felipe	Center court Referees: Brigham Beatie (USA), Juan Saavedra (COL)
17 June 2022; 21:00	(18–21, 15–21); Report			Center court Referees: Brigham Beatie (USA), Juan Saavedra (COL)

17 June 2022; 22:00	Schalk – Brunner (United States)	2–1	(Netherlands) Brouwer – Meeuwsen	Center court Referees: Rui Carvalho (POR), Vincent Roche (FRA)
17 June 2022; 22:00	(21–16, 16–21, 15–12); Report			Center court Referees: Rui Carvalho (POR), Vincent Roche (FRA)

=== Semifinals ===
18 June 2022; 17:15	Renato – Vitor Felipe (Brazil)	2–0	(United States) Schalk – Brunner	Center court Referees: Charalampos Papadogoulas (GRE), Vincent Roche (FRA)
18 June 2022; 17:15	(21–17, 21–19); Report			Center court Referees: Charalampos Papadogoulas (GRE), Vincent Roche (FRA)

18 June 2022; 21:15	A. Mol – Sørum (Norway)	2–0	(Brazil) André – George	Center court Referees: Davide Crescentini (ITA), Maarten Ghysel (BEL)
18 June 2022; 21:15	(21–14, 21–18); Report			Center court Referees: Davide Crescentini (ITA), Maarten Ghysel (BEL)

=== Bronze medal match ===
19 June 2022; 17:15	André – George (Brazil)	2–1	(United States) Schalk – Brunner	Center court Referees: Osvaldo Sumavil (ARG), Rui Carvalho (POR)
19 June 2022; 17:15	(15–21, 21–17, 15–11)			Center court Referees: Osvaldo Sumavil (ARG), Rui Carvalho (POR)

=== Gold medal match ===
19 June 2022; 21:15	A. Mol – Sørum (Norway)	2–0	(Brazil) Renato – Vitor Felipe	Center court Referees: Charalampos Papadogoulas (GRE), Davide Crescentini (ITA)
19 June 2022; 21:15	(21–15, 21–16); Report			Center court Referees: Charalampos Papadogoulas (GRE), Davide Crescentini (ITA)

== Final ranking ==
Rank	Team
Gold medal	(Norway) A. Mol – Sørum
Silver medal	(Brazil) Renato – Vitor Felipe
Bronze medal	(Brazil) André – George
4	(United States) Schalk – Brunner
5	(Brazil) Alison – Guto
5	(Brazil) Bruno Schmidt – Saymon
5	(Estonia) Nõlvak – Tiisaar
5	(Netherlands) Brouwer – Meeuwsen
9	(Australia) Nicolaidis – Carracher
9	(Austria) Seidl – Waller
9	(Chile) M. Grimalt – E. Grimalt
9	(Italy) Nicolai – Cottafava
9	(Poland) Kantor – Rudol
9	(Qatar) Cherif – Ahmed
9	(United States) Crabb – Bourne
9	(Italy) Lupo – Ranghieri
17	(Australia) McHugh – Burnett
17	(Austria) Ermacora – Pristauz
17	(Austria) Huber – Dressler
17	(Canada) Schachter – Dearing
17	(Cuba) Díaz – Alayo
17	(Czech Republic) Perušič – Schweiner
17	(Spain) Herrera – Gavira
17	(France) Krou – Gauthier-Rat
17	(Germany) Ehlers – Wickler
17	(Italy) Carambula – Rossi
17	(Latvia) Samoilovs – Šmēdiņš
17	(Netherlands) Immers – Boermans
17	(Netherlands) Luini – Penninga
17	(Netherlands) Varenhorst – Van de Velde
17	(Norway) Berntsen – H. Mol
17	(United States) Sander – Crabb
33	(Argentina) N. Capogrosso – T. Capogrosso
33	(Italy) Benzi – Bonifazi
33	(Mexico) Virgen – Sarabia
33	(Thailand) Surin – Banlue
37	(Chile) Aravena – Droguett
37	(China) Wu – Halikejiang
37	(Colombia) Murray – Rivas
37	(The Gambia) Jawo – Jarra
37	(Iran) Salemi – Vakili
37	(Italy) Windisch – Dal Corso
37	(Morocco) Abicha – El Gharouti
37	(Mozambique) Martinho – Monjane
37	(Nicaragua) Mora – López
37	(Paraguay) Gonzalo – Roger
37	(Poland) Bryl – Łosiak
37	(Uruguay) Hannibal – Cairus

== See also ==
- 2022 Beach Volleyball World Championships – Women's tournament
