= Beach volleyball at the 2023 Pan American Games =

- Beach volleyball pictogram
- Venue: Beach volleyball center
- Start date: October 21, 2023
- End date: October 27, 2023
- No. of events: 2 (1 men, 1 women)
- Competitors: 64 from 19 nations

Beach volleyball competitions at the 2023 Pan American Games in Santiago, Chile are scheduled to be held between October 21 and 27 at the Beach volleyball center, located in Peñalolén.

Two medal events are scheduled to be contested. The events are: a men's and women's tournament. A total of 64 athletes (32 per gender and 16 teams per event) are scheduled to compete.

== Qualification ==
A total of 64 Beach volleyball athletes will qualify to compete. Each nation may enter a maximum of 4 athletes (one team per gender of two athletes). As host nation, Chile automatically qualified a full team of four athletes (one team per gender). The best team per gender from NORCECA (North America, Central America and Caribbean) and CSV (South America) at the 2021 Junior Pan American Games also secured a quota. All other quotas were awarded through rankings (the three best teams per gender in the FIVB World Ranking, followed by five teams per gender from NORCECA and CSV.

== Participating nations ==
A total of 19 countries qualified athletes. The number of athletes a nation entered is in parentheses beside the name of the country.

- Argentina (4)
- Bolivia (2)
- Brazil (4)
- Canada (4)
- Chile (4)
- Colombia (4)
- Costa Rica (4)
- Cuba (2)
- Dominican Republic (2)
- Ecuador (4)
- El Salvador (4)
- Independent Athletes Team (4)
- Mexico (4)
- Nicaragua (2)
- Paraguay (4)
- Peru (2)
- Puerto Rico (2)
- United States (4)
- Uruguay (4)

== Medal summary ==
=== Medal table ===
* Host nation (Chile)

Rank	Nation	Gold	Silver	Bronze	Total
1	Brazil	2	0	0	2
2	Canada	0	1	0	1
2	Cuba	0	1	0	1
4	Chile*	0	0	1	1
4	United States	0	0	1	1
Totals (5 entries)		2	2	2	6

=== Medalists ===
Event	Gold	Silver	Bronze
Men's tournament	Brazil; André Stein; George Wanderley	Cuba; Jorge Alayo; Noslen Díaz	Chile; Esteban Grimalt; Marco Grimalt
Women's tournament	Brazil; Ana Patrícia Ramos; Duda Lisboa	Canada; Melissa Humana-Paredes; Brandie Wilkerson	United States; Corinne Quiggle; Sarah Murphy

== See also ==
- Beach volleyball at the 2024 Summer Olympics
