= Beach volleyball at the 2023 Pan American Games – Men's tournament =

Beach volleyball – Men's tournament at the 2023 Pan American Games
- Venue: Beach volleyball center
- Dates: October 21–27
- Competitors: 32 from 16 nations

Medalists
Gold medal	André Stein; George Wanderley	Brazil
Silver medal	Jorge Luis Alayo; Noslen Díaz	Cuba
Bronze medal	Esteban Grimalt; Marco Grimalt	Chile

The men's tournament competition of the beach volleyball events at the 2023 Pan American Games took place between 21 and 27 of October in Santiago, Chile at the Beach volleyball center, a temporary venue in Peñalolén cluster.

== Qualification ==
As the host nation, Chile automatically qualified a team. The best team from NORCECA (North America, Central America and Caribbean) and CSV (South America) at the 2021 Junior Pan American Games also secured a quota. All other quotas were awarded through rankings (the three best teams per gender in the FIVB World Ranking, followed by five teams per gender from NORCECA and CSV.

=== Qualification summary ===
Event/Criteria	Quotas	Qualified NOC's
Host nation	1	Chile
2021 Junior Pan American Games NORCECA	1	Cuba
2021 Junior Pan American Games CSV	1	Brazil
World Rankings	3	United States; Argentina; Canada
NORCECA Rankings	5	Mexico; Guatemala; Costa Rica; El Salvador; Nicaragua
CSV Rankings	5	Ecuador; Uruguay; Paraguay; Colombia; Bolivia
Total	16	

== Competition format ==
Each of the 16 pairs in the tournament will be placed in one of four groups of four teams apiece, and play a round-robin within that pool. The top two three in each pool advance to the knockout rounds. The fourth-placed teams in each group, will be eliminated and will play in the 13 to 16 place bracket.

The 12 teams that advanced to the elimination rounds will play a single-elimination tournament with a bronze medal match between the semifinal losers.

== Schedule ==
Date	Start	Finish	Phase
October 21, 2023	12:30	20:00	Preliminaries
October 22, 2023	12:30	20:00	Preliminaries
October 23, 2023	12:30	20:00	Preliminaries
October 24, 2023	12:30	19:00	Elimination stage/Quarterfinal qualifiers
October 25, 2023	13:00	20:00	Quarterfinals
October 26, 2023	19:00	20:00	Semifinals
October 27, 2023	17:00	19:00	Gold/Bronze medal matches

== Results ==
=== Preliminary round ===
==== Group A ====
Pos	Team	Pld	W	L	Pts	SW	SL	SR	SPW	SPL	SPR	Qualification
1	Grimalt – Grimalt (CHI)	3	3	0	6	6	0	MAX	126	94	1.340	Quarterfinals
2	Sarabia – Virgen (MEX)	3	2	1	5	4	3	1.333	122	122	1.000	Quarterfinals qualifying
3	Massare – Melgarejo (PAR)	3	1	2	4	3	4	0.750	121	127	0.953	Quarterfinals qualifying
4	Mora – López (NCA)	3	0	3	3	0	6	0.000	92	126	0.730	Placement 13th–16th

Updated to match(es) played on unknown. Source:

October 21, 2023; 18:00	Sarabia – Virgen (Mexico)	2 – 1	(Paraguay) Massare – Melgarejo	Centro de Vóleibol Playa – Court 1 Referees: Martín Swaset (BIZ), Sergio Silva Duarte (NCA)
October 21, 2023; 18:00	(19–21, 21–14, 15–13); Report			Centro de Vóleibol Playa – Court 1 Referees: Martín Swaset (BIZ), Sergio Silva Duarte (NCA)

October 21, 2023; 20:00	Grimalt – Grimalt (Chile)	2 – 0	(Nicaragua) Mora – López	Centro de Vóleibol Playa – Court 1 Referees: Mauro Henrique Camara (BRA), Rogol Mills-Costoso (SKN)
October 21, 2023; 20:00	(21–13, 21–17); Report			Centro de Vóleibol Playa – Court 1 Referees: Mauro Henrique Camara (BRA), Rogol Mills-Costoso (SKN)

October 22, 2023; 18:00	Sarabia – Virgen (Mexico)	2 – 0	(Nicaragua) Mora – López	Centro de Vóleibol Playa – Court 1 Referees: Claudia Guerrero Rodríguez (HON), John Peralta Moreno (COL)
October 22, 2023; 18:00	(21–15, 21–17); Report			Centro de Vóleibol Playa – Court 1 Referees: Claudia Guerrero Rodríguez (HON), John Peralta Moreno (COL)

October 22, 2023; 20:00	Grimalt – Grimalt (Chile)	2 – 0	(Paraguay) Massare – Melgarejo	Centro de Vóleibol Playa – Court 1 Referees: Eduardo Paiz López (ESA), Erick Martínez Reyes (CUB)
October 22, 2023; 20:00	(21–18, 21–13); Report			Centro de Vóleibol Playa – Court 1 Referees: Eduardo Paiz López (ESA), Erick Martínez Reyes (CUB)

October 23, 2023; 18:00	Massare – Melgarejo (Paraguay)	2 – 0	(Nicaragua) Mora – López	Centro de Vóleibol Playa – Court 1 Referees: Hernán Echeñique Espinoza (CHI), Erick Martínez Reyes (CUB)
October 23, 2023; 18:00	(21–13, 21–17); Report			Centro de Vóleibol Playa – Court 1 Referees: Hernán Echeñique Espinoza (CHI), Erick Martínez Reyes (CUB)

October 23, 2023; 20:00	Grimalt – Grimalt (Chile)	2 – 0	(Mexico) Sarabia – Virgen	Centro de Vóleibol Playa – Court 1 Referees: Martín Swasey (BIZ), John Peralta Moreno (COL)
October 23, 2023; 20:00	(21–17, 21–16); Report			Centro de Vóleibol Playa – Court 1 Referees: Martín Swasey (BIZ), John Peralta Moreno (COL)

==== Group B ====
Pos	Team	Pld	W	L	Pts	SW	SL	SR	SPW	SPL	SPR	Qualification
1	Webber – Smith (USA)	3	3	0	6	6	2	3.000	151	125	1.208	Quarterfinals
2	Hannibal – Llambias (URU)	3	2	1	5	5	2	2.500	135	119	1.134	Quarterfinals qualifying
3	Calvo – Salvatierra (BOL)	3	1	2	4	2	4	0.500	109	115	0.948	Quarterfinals qualifying
4	García – Leonardo (EAI)	3	0	3	3	1	6	0.167	138	138	1.000	Placement 13th–16th

Updated to match(es) played on unknown. Source:

October 21, 2023; 13:00	Webber – Smith (United States)	2 – 0	(Bolivia) Calvo – Salvatierra	Centro de Vóleibol Playa – Court 1 Referees: Sergio Silva Duarte (NCA), Mauro Henrique Camara (BRA)
October 21, 2023; 13:00	(21–15, 21–15); Report			Centro de Vóleibol Playa – Court 1 Referees: Sergio Silva Duarte (NCA), Mauro Henrique Camara (BRA)

October 21, 2023; 14:00	Hannibal – Llambias (Uruguay)	2 – 0	(Guatemala) García – Leonardo	Centro de Vóleibol Playa – Court 1 Referees: Erick Martínez Reyes (CUB), Mercedes Cerdeño (ECU)
October 21, 2023; 14:00	(21–14, 21–13); Report			Centro de Vóleibol Playa – Court 1 Referees: Erick Martínez Reyes (CUB), Mercedes Cerdeño (ECU)

October 22, 2023; 13:00	Webber – Smith (United States)	2 – 1	(Guatemala) García – Leonardo	Centro de Vóleibol Playa – Court 1 Referees: John Peralta Moreno (COL), Eduardo Paiz López (ESA)
October 22, 2023; 13:00	(21–15, 18–21, 15–10); Report			Centro de Vóleibol Playa – Court 1 Referees: John Peralta Moreno (COL), Eduardo Paiz López (ESA)

October 22, 2023; 14:00	Hannibal – Llambias (Uruguay)	2 – 0	(Bolivia) Calvo – Salvatierra	Centro de Vóleibol Playa – Court 1 Referees: Kenneth George Waugh (JAM), Claudia Vega Carpio (PER)
October 22, 2023; 14:00	(21–16, 23–21); Report			Centro de Vóleibol Playa – Court 1 Referees: Kenneth George Waugh (JAM), Claudia Vega Carpio (PER)

October 23, 2023; 13:00	Webber – Smith (United States)	2 – 1	(Uruguay) Hannibal – Llambias	Centro de Vóleibol Playa – Court 1 Referees: Erick Martinez Reyes (CUB), Martín Swasey (BIZ)
October 23, 2023; 13:00	(21–16, 19–21, 15–12); Report			Centro de Vóleibol Playa – Court 1 Referees: Erick Martinez Reyes (CUB), Martín Swasey (BIZ)

October 23, 2023; 14:00	García – Leonardo (Guatemala)	0 – 2	(Bolivia) Calvo – Salvatierra	Centro de Vóleibol Playa – Court 1 Referees: John Peralta Moreno (COL), Salvador de Jesús Bautista Suero (DOM)
October 23, 2023; 14:00	(15–21, 14–21); Report			Centro de Vóleibol Playa – Court 1 Referees: John Peralta Moreno (COL), Salvador de Jesús Bautista Suero (DOM)

==== Group C ====
Pos	Team	Pld	W	L	Pts	SW	SL	SR	SPW	SPL	SPR	Qualification
1	Alayo – Díaz (CUB)	3	3	0	6	6	1	6.000	138	92	1.500	Quarterfinals
2	Stein – Wanderley (BRA)	3	2	1	5	5	2	2.500	129	99	1.303	Quarterfinals qualifying
3	Murray – Noriega (COL)	3	1	2	4	2	4	0.500	89	118	0.754	Quarterfinals qualifying
4	Flores – Guatemala (ESA)	3	0	3	3	0	6	0.000	79	126	0.627	Placement 13th–16th

Updated to match(es) played on unknown. Source:

October 21, 2023; 18:30	Stein – Wanderley (Brazil)	2 – 0	(El Salvador) Flores – Guatemala	Centro de Vóleibol Playa – Court 2 Referees: Hernán Echeñique Espinoza (CHI), Marlene Hernández Arredondo (MEX)
October 21, 2023; 18:30	(21–7, 21–13); Report			Centro de Vóleibol Playa – Court 2 Referees: Hernán Echeñique Espinoza (CHI), Marlene Hernández Arredondo (MEX)

October 21, 2023; 19:30	Alayo – Díaz (Cuba)	2 – 0	(Colombia) Murray – Noriega	Centro de Vóleibol Playa – Court 2 Referees: Eduardo Paiz López (ESA), Diego Medina Marti (ARG)
October 21, 2023; 19:30	(21–8, 21–14); Report			Centro de Vóleibol Playa – Court 2 Referees: Eduardo Paiz López (ESA), Diego Medina Marti (ARG)

October 22, 2023; 18:30	Stein – Wanderley (Brazil)	2 – 0	(Colombia) Murray – Noriega	Centro de Vóleibol Playa – Court 2 Referees: Sergio Cifuentes Chete (GUA), Mercedes Cerdeño (ECU)
October 22, 2023; 18:30	(21–15, 21–10); Report			Centro de Vóleibol Playa – Court 2 Referees: Sergio Cifuentes Chete (GUA), Mercedes Cerdeño (ECU)

October 22, 2023; 19:30	Alayo – Díaz (Cuba)	2 – 0	(El Salvador) Flores – Guatemala	Centro de Vóleibol Playa – Court 2 Referees: Sergio Silva Duarte (NCA), Rogol Mills-Costoso (SKN)
October 22, 2023; 19:30	(21–13, 21–12); Report			Centro de Vóleibol Playa – Court 2 Referees: Sergio Silva Duarte (NCA), Rogol Mills-Costoso (SKN)

October 23, 2023; 18:30	Stein – Wanderley (Brazil)	1 – 2	(Cuba) Alayo – Díaz	Centro de Vóleibol Playa – Court 2 Referees: Eduardo Paiz López (ESA), Claudia Vega Carpio (PER)
October 23, 2023; 18:30	(16–21, 21–18, 8–15); Report			Centro de Vóleibol Playa – Court 2 Referees: Eduardo Paiz López (ESA), Claudia Vega Carpio (PER)

October 23, 2023; 19:30	Murray – Noriega (Colombia)	2 – 0	(El Salvador) Flores – Guatemala	Centro de Vóleibol Playa – Court 2 Referees: Mauro Henrique Camara (BRA), Sergio Cifuentes Chete (GUA)
October 23, 2023; 19:30	(21–16, 21–18); Report			Centro de Vóleibol Playa – Court 2 Referees: Mauro Henrique Camara (BRA), Sergio Cifuentes Chete (GUA)

==== Group D ====
Pos	Team	Pld	W	L	Pts	SW	SL	SR	SPW	SPL	SPR	Qualification
1	Capogrosso – Capogrosso (ARG)	3	3	0	6	6	0	MAX	126	79	1.595	Quarterfinals
2	León – Tenorio (ECU)	3	2	1	5	4	2	2.000	115	113	1.018	Quarterfinals qualifying
3	Macneil – Russell (CAN)	3	1	2	4	2	4	0.500	106	110	0.964	Quarterfinals qualifying
4	Varela – Dyner (CRC)	3	0	3	3	0	6	0.000	81	126	0.643	Placement 13th–16th

Updated to match(es) played on unknown. Source:

October 21, 2023; 12:30	Macneil – Russell (Canada)	0 – 2	(Ecuador) León – Tenorio	Centro de Vóleibol Playa – Court 2 Referees: Marlene Hernandez Arredondo (MEX), Kenneth George Waugh (JAM)
October 21, 2023; 12:30	(18–21, 20–22); Report			Centro de Vóleibol Playa – Court 2 Referees: Marlene Hernandez Arredondo (MEX), Kenneth George Waugh (JAM)

October 21, 2023; 13:30	Capogrosso – Capogrosso (Argentina)	2 – 0	(Costa Rica) Varela – Dyner	Centro de Vóleibol Playa – Court 2 Referees: Claudia Guerrero Rodriguez (HON), Hernán Echeñique Espinoza (CHI)
October 21, 2023; 13:30	(21–12, 21–11); Report			Centro de Vóleibol Playa – Court 2 Referees: Claudia Guerrero Rodriguez (HON), Hernán Echeñique Espinoza (CHI)

October 22, 2023; 12:30	Macneil – Russell (Canada)	2 – 0	(Costa Rica) Varela – Dyner	Centro de Vóleibol Playa – Court 2 Referees: Hernan Echeñique Espinoza (CHI), Sergio Silva Duarte (NCA)
October 22, 2023; 12:30	(21–11, 21–14); Report			Centro de Vóleibol Playa – Court 2 Referees: Hernan Echeñique Espinoza (CHI), Sergio Silva Duarte (NCA)

October 22, 2023; 13:30	Capogrosso – Capogrosso (Argentina)	2 – 0	(Ecuador) León – Tenorio	Centro de Vóleibol Playa – Court 2 Referees: Marlene Hernandez Arredondo (MEX), Sergio Cifuentes Chete (GUA)
October 22, 2023; 13:30	(21–17, 21–13); Report			Centro de Vóleibol Playa – Court 2 Referees: Marlene Hernandez Arredondo (MEX), Sergio Cifuentes Chete (GUA)

October 23, 2023; 12:30	Macneil – Russell (Canada)	0 – 2	(Argentina) Capogrosso – Capogrosso	Centro de Vóleibol Playa – Court 2 Referees: Marlene Hernandez Arredondo (MEX), Claudia Guerrero Rodriguez (HON)
October 23, 2023; 12:30	(14–21, 12–21); Report			Centro de Vóleibol Playa – Court 2 Referees: Marlene Hernandez Arredondo (MEX), Claudia Guerrero Rodriguez (HON)

October 23, 2023; 13:30	Varela – Dyner (Costa Rica)	0 – 2	(Ecuador) León – Tenorio	Centro de Vóleibol Playa – Court 2 Referees: Claudia Vega Carpio (PER), Diego Medina Marti (ARG)
October 23, 2023; 13:30	(19–21, 14–21); Report			Centro de Vóleibol Playa – Court 2 Referees: Claudia Vega Carpio (PER), Diego Medina Marti (ARG)

=== Placement 13th–16th ===
13th–16th semifinals
Varela – Dyner (CRC)	0
Mora – López (NCA)	2
García – Leonardo (EAI)	0
Flores – Guatemala (ESA)	2

13th–14th place match
Mora – López (NCA)	2
Flores – Guatemala (ESA)	1
15th–16th place match
Varela – Dyner (CRC)	0
García – Leonardo (EAI)	2

==== 13th–16th semifinals ====
October 24, 2023; 12:30	Varela – Dyner (Costa Rica)	0 – 2	(Nicaragua) Mora – López	Centro de Vóleibol Playa – Court 2 Referees: Kenneth George Waugh (JAM), Marlene Hernandez Arredondo (MEX)
October 24, 2023; 12:30	(12–21, 17–21); Report			Centro de Vóleibol Playa – Court 2 Referees: Kenneth George Waugh (JAM), Marlene Hernandez Arredondo (MEX)

October 24, 2023; 13:30	García – Leonardo (Guatemala)	0 – 2	(El Salvador) Flores – Guatemala	Centro de Vóleibol Playa – Court 2 Referees: Mauro Henrique Camara (BRA), Erick Martinez Reyes (CUB)
October 24, 2023; 13:30	(18–21, 18–21); Report			Centro de Vóleibol Playa – Court 2 Referees: Mauro Henrique Camara (BRA), Erick Martinez Reyes (CUB)

==== 16th–17th semifinals ====
October 25, 2023; 18:30	Varela – Dyner (Costa Rica)	0 – 2	(Guatemala) García – Leonardo	Centro de Vóleibol Playa – Court 2 Referees: Hector Carvajal Mozzo (URU), Mauro Henrique Camara (BRA)
October 25, 2023; 18:30	(15–21, 12–21); Report			Centro de Vóleibol Playa – Court 2 Referees: Hector Carvajal Mozzo (URU), Mauro Henrique Camara (BRA)

==== 13th–14th semifinals ====
October 25, 2023; 19:30	Mora – López (Nicaragua)	2 – 1	(El Salvador) Flores – Guatemala	Centro de Vóleibol Playa – Court 2 Referees: Justo Benitez Rodriguez (PAR), Mercedes Cerdeño (ECU)
October 25, 2023; 19:30	(24–26, 21–14, 15–7); Report			Centro de Vóleibol Playa – Court 2 Referees: Justo Benitez Rodriguez (PAR), Mercedes Cerdeño (ECU)

=== Placement 9th–12th ===
9th–10th semifinals
Hannibal – Llambias (URU)	2
Massare – Melgarejo (PAR)	1
Calvo – Salvatierra (BOL)	1
Murray – Noriega (COL)	2

9th place match
Hannibal – Llambias (URU)	2
Murray – Noriega (COL)	1
11th place match
Massare – Melgarejo (PAR)	2
Calvo – Salvatierra (BOL)	0

==== 9th–12th semifinals ====
October 25, 2023; 12:30	Hannibal – Llambias (Uruguay)	2 – 1	(Paraguay) Massare – Melgarejo	Centro de Vóleibol Playa – Court 2 Referees: Rogol Mills-Costoso (SKN), John Peralta Moreno (COL)
October 25, 2023; 12:30	(21–13, 18–21, 15–10); Report			Centro de Vóleibol Playa – Court 2 Referees: Rogol Mills-Costoso (SKN), John Peralta Moreno (COL)

October 25, 2023; 13:30	Calvo – Salvatierra (Bolivia)	1 – 2	(Colombia) Murray – Noriega	Centro de Vóleibol Playa – Court 2 Referees: Salvador de Jesús Bautista Suero (DOM), Justo Benitez Gonzalez (PAR)
October 25, 2023; 13:30	(21–19, 15–21, 10–15); Report			Centro de Vóleibol Playa – Court 2 Referees: Salvador de Jesús Bautista Suero (DOM), Justo Benitez Gonzalez (PAR)

==== 11th–12th place match ====
October 26, 2023; 12:30	Massare – Melgarejo (Paraguay)	2 – 0	(Bolivia) Calvo – Salvatierra	Centro de Vóleibol Playa – Court 2 Referees: Salvador de Jesús Bautista Suero (DOM), Héctor Carvajal Mozzo (URU)
October 26, 2023; 12:30	(21–14, 22–20); Report			Centro de Vóleibol Playa – Court 2 Referees: Salvador de Jesús Bautista Suero (DOM), Héctor Carvajal Mozzo (URU)

==== 9th–10th place match ====
October 26, 2023; 13:30	Hannibal – Llambias (Uruguay)	2 – 1	(Colombia) Murray – Noriega	Centro de Vóleibol Playa – Court 2 Referees: Kenneth George Waugh (JAM), Eduardo Paiz López (ESA)
October 26, 2023; 13:30	(15–21, 25–23, 15–12); Report			Centro de Vóleibol Playa – Court 2 Referees: Kenneth George Waugh (JAM), Eduardo Paiz López (ESA)

=== Placement 1st–4th ===
Quarterfinals qualifying
Hannibal – Llambias (URU)	0
Macneil – Russell (CAN)	2
Stein – Wanderley (BRA)	2
Massare – Melgarejo (PAR)	0
León – Tenorio (ECU)	2
Calvo – Salvatierra (BOL)	0
Murray – Noriega (COL)	0
Sarabia – Virgen (MEX)	2

Quarterfinals
Grimalt – Grimalt (CHI)	2
Macneil – Russell (CAN)	0
Capogrosso – Capogrosso (ARG)	1
Stein – Wanderley (BRA)	2
Alayo – Díaz (CUB)	2
León – Tenorio (ECU)	0
Webber – Smith (USA)	2
Sarabia – Virgen (MEX)	0

Semifinals
Grimalt – Grimalt (CHI)	0
Stein – Wanderley (BRA)	2
Alayo – Díaz (CUB)	2
Webber – Smith (USA)	0

Gold medal match
Alayo – Díaz (CUB)	1
Stein – Wanderley (BRA)	2
Bronze medal match
Grimalt – Grimalt (CHI)	2
Webber – Smith (USA)	1

==== Quarterfinals qualifying ====
Losers of Quarterfinals qualifying are transferred to Placement 9th–12th.

October 24, 2023; 13:00	Hannibal – Llambias (Uruguay)	0 – 2	(Canada) Macneil – Russell	Centro de Voleibol Playa – Court 1 Referees: Sergio Cifuentes Chete (GUA), Hernán Echeñique Espinoza (CHI)
October 24, 2023; 13:00	(14–21, 16–21); Report			Centro de Voleibol Playa – Court 1 Referees: Sergio Cifuentes Chete (GUA), Hernán Echeñique Espinoza (CHI)

October 24, 2023; 14:00	Stein – Wanderley (Brazil)	2 – 0	(Paraguay) Massare – Melgarejo	Centro de Voleibol Playa – Court 1 Referees: Diego Medina Martí (ARG), Salvador de Jesús Bautista Suero (DOM)
October 24, 2023; 14:00	(21–14, 21–14); Report			Centro de Voleibol Playa – Court 1 Referees: Diego Medina Martí (ARG), Salvador de Jesús Bautista Suero (DOM)

October 24, 2023; 18:00	León – Tenorio (Ecuador)	2 – 0	(Bolivia) Calvo – Salvatierra	Centro de Voleibol Playa – Court 1 Referees: Héctor Carbajal Mozzo (URU), Kenneth George Waugh (JAM)
October 24, 2023; 18:00	(23–21, 21–10); Report			Centro de Voleibol Playa – Court 1 Referees: Héctor Carbajal Mozzo (URU), Kenneth George Waugh (JAM)

October 24, 2023; 19:00	Murray – Noriega (Colombia)	0 – 2	(Mexico) Sarabia – Virgen	Centro de Voleibol Playa – Court 1 Referees: Martin Swasey (BIZ), Mercedes Cerdeño (ECU)
October 24, 2023; 19:00	(21–23, 19–21); Report			Centro de Voleibol Playa – Court 1 Referees: Martin Swasey (BIZ), Mercedes Cerdeño (ECU)

==== Quarterfinals ====
Losers of Quarterfinals are transferred to Placement 5th–8th.

October 25, 2023; 13:00	Alayo – Díaz (Cuba)	2 – 0	(Ecuador) León – Tenorio	Centro de Voleibol Playa – Court 1 Referees: Hernán Echeñique Espinoza (CHI), Martin Swasey (BIZ)
October 25, 2023; 13:00	(21–16, 21–19); Report			Centro de Voleibol Playa – Court 1 Referees: Hernán Echeñique Espinoza (CHI), Martin Swasey (BIZ)

October 25, 2023; 14:00	Webber – Smith (United States)	2 – 0	(Mexico) Sarabia – Virgen	Centro de Voleibol Playa – Court 1 Referees: Diego Medina Martí (ARG), Erick Martinez Reyes (CUB)
October 25, 2023; 14:00	(21–18, 21–15); Report			Centro de Voleibol Playa – Court 1 Referees: Diego Medina Martí (ARG), Erick Martinez Reyes (CUB)

October 25, 2023; 18:00	Capogrosso – Capogrosso (Argentina)	1 – 2	(Brazil) Stein – Wanderley	Centro de Voleibol Playa – Court 1 Referees: Eduardo Paiz López (ESA), Marlene Hernandez Arredondo (MEX)
October 25, 2023; 18:00	(17–21, 21–15, 15–17); Report			Centro de Voleibol Playa – Court 1 Referees: Eduardo Paiz López (ESA), Marlene Hernandez Arredondo (MEX)

October 25, 2023; 20:00	Grimalt – Grimalt (Chile)	2 – 0	(Canada) Macneil – Russell	Centro de Voleibol Playa – Court 1 Referees: Sergio Silva Duarte (NCA), John Peralta Moreno (COL)
October 25, 2023; 20:00	(23–21, 21–18); Report			Centro de Voleibol Playa – Court 1 Referees: Sergio Silva Duarte (NCA), John Peralta Moreno (COL)

==== Semifinals ====
October 25, 2023; 19:00	Alayo – Noslen Díaz (Cuba)	2 – 0	(United States) Webber – Smith	Centro de Voleibol Playa – Court 1 Referees: Kenneth George Waugh (JAM), Eduardo Paiz López (ESA)
October 25, 2023; 19:00	(21–15, 21–13); Report			Centro de Voleibol Playa – Court 1 Referees: Kenneth George Waugh (JAM), Eduardo Paiz López (ESA)

October 26, 2023; 20:00	Grimalt – Grimalt (Chile)	0 – 2	(Brazil) Stein – Wanderley	Centro de Voleibol Playa – Court 1 Referees: Sergio Silva Duarte (NCA), Rogol Mills-Costoso (SKN)
October 26, 2023; 20:00	(13–21, 17–21); Report			Centro de Voleibol Playa – Court 1 Referees: Sergio Silva Duarte (NCA), Rogol Mills-Costoso (SKN)

==== Bronze medal match ====
October 27, 2023; 17:00	Grimalt – Grimalt (Chile)	2 – 1	(United States) Webber – Smith	Centro de Voleibol Playa – Court 1 Referees: Mauro Henrique Camara (BRA), Salvador de Jesus Bautista Suero (DOM)
October 27, 2023; 17:00	(21-14, 18-21, 15-12); Report			Centro de Voleibol Playa – Court 1 Referees: Mauro Henrique Camara (BRA), Salvador de Jesus Bautista Suero (DOM)

==== Gold medal match ====
October 27, 2023; 19:00	Alayo – Díaz (Cuba)	1 – 2	(Brazil) Stein – Wanderley	Centro de Voleibol Playa – Court 1 Referees: Diego Martín Medina Martí (ARG), Martin Swasey (BIZ)
October 27, 2023; 19:00	(12-21, 21-19, 13-15); Report			Centro de Voleibol Playa – Court 1 Referees: Diego Martín Medina Martí (ARG), Martin Swasey (BIZ)

== Final standings ==
Rank	Team
1st place, gold medalist(s)	André Stein – George Wanderley (BRA)
2nd place, silver medalist(s)	Jorge Luis Alayo – Noslen Díaz (CUB)
3rd place, bronze medalist(s)	Esteban Grimalt – Marco Grimalt (CHI)
4	Logan Webber – Hagen Smith (USA)
5	Jake Macneil – Alexander Russell (CAN)
6	Miguel Sarabia – Juan Ramón Virgen (MEX)
7	Dany León – Marcos Tenorio (ECU)
8	Tomás Capogrosso – Nicolas Capogrosso (ARG)
9	Hans Hannibal – Nicolas Llambias (URU)
10	Johan Murray – Juan Noriega (COL)
11	Giuliano Massare – Gonzalo Melgarejo (PAR)
12	Luis Calvo – Ruddy Salvatierra (BOL)
13	Ruben Mora – Dany López (NCA)
14	Franklin Flores – Armando Guatemala (ESA)
15	Luis García – Andy Leonardo (EAI)
16	Jhostin Varela – Daniel Dyner (CRC)
