= George Wanderley =

Brazilian beach volleyball player (born 1996)

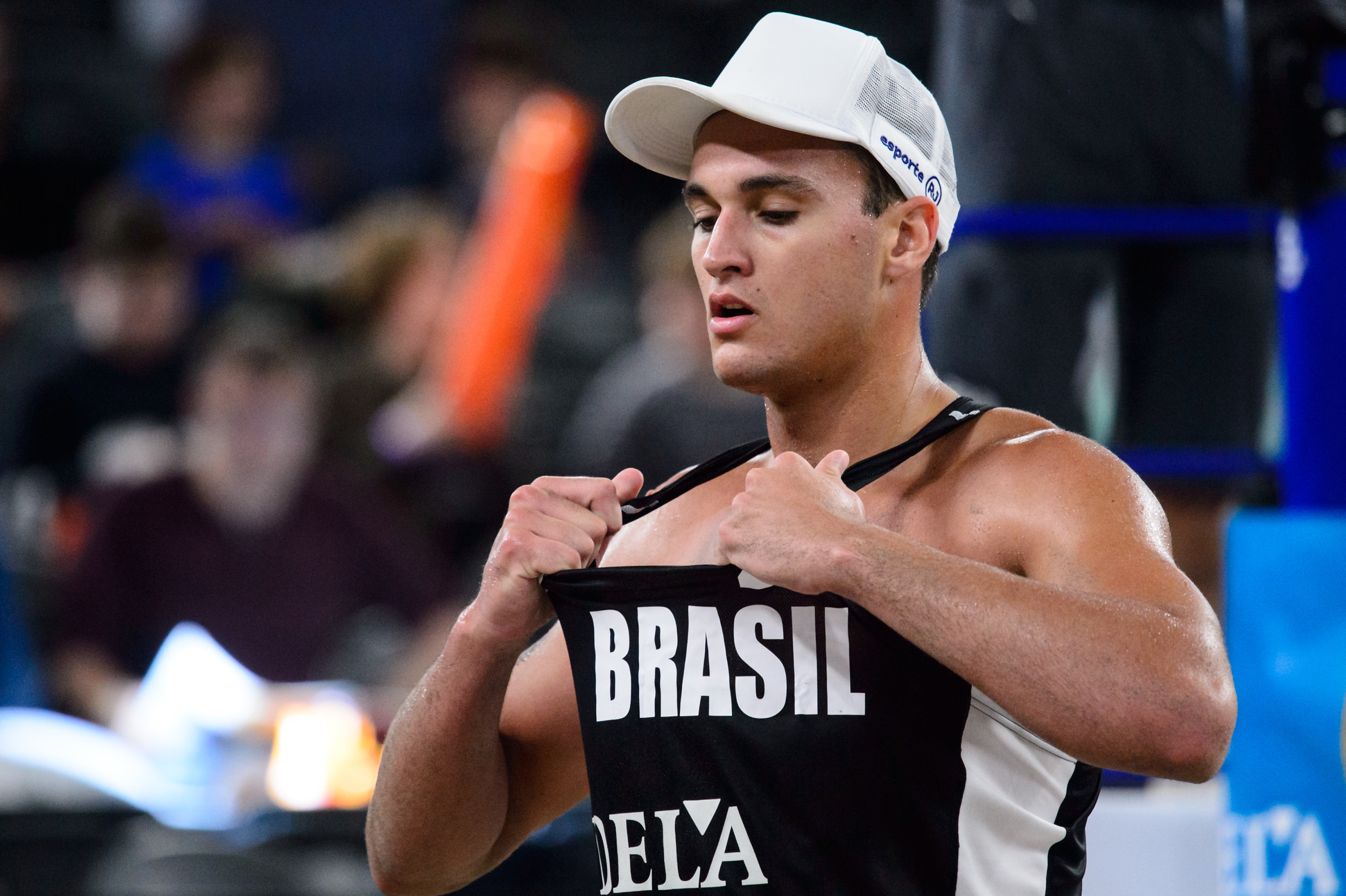
- Wanderley in 2018

Personal information
- Full name: George Souto Maior Wanderley
- Born: 12 September 1996 (age 29) Campina Grande, PB, Brazil
- Height: 1.90 m (6 ft 3 in)
- Weight: 87 kg (192 lb)

Sport
- Sport: Beach volleyball
Medal record
Men's beach volleyball
Representing Brazil
World Championships
Bronze medal – third place	2022 Rome	Beach
Pan American Games
Gold medal – first place	2023 Santiago	Beach
U19 World Championships
Gold medal – first place	2014 Porto	Beach
U21 World Championships
Gold medal – first place	2016 Lucerne	Beach

George Souto Maior Wanderley (born 12 September 1996) is a Brazilian beach volleyball player.

He participated in the 2014 Summer Youth Olympics, finishing in 5th place.

He was Under-19 World Champion in 2014 (Portugal), and Under-21 World Champion in 2016 (Switzerland), as well as Champion of the Brazilian Circuit 2019/2020.

Wanderley won a bronze medal at the 2022 Beach Volleyball World Championships along with his partner André Stein.

At the 2023 Pan American Games held in Santiago, Chile, he won a gold medal along with his partner André Stein.
