= Jorge Alayo =

Cuban beach volleyball player (born 2001)

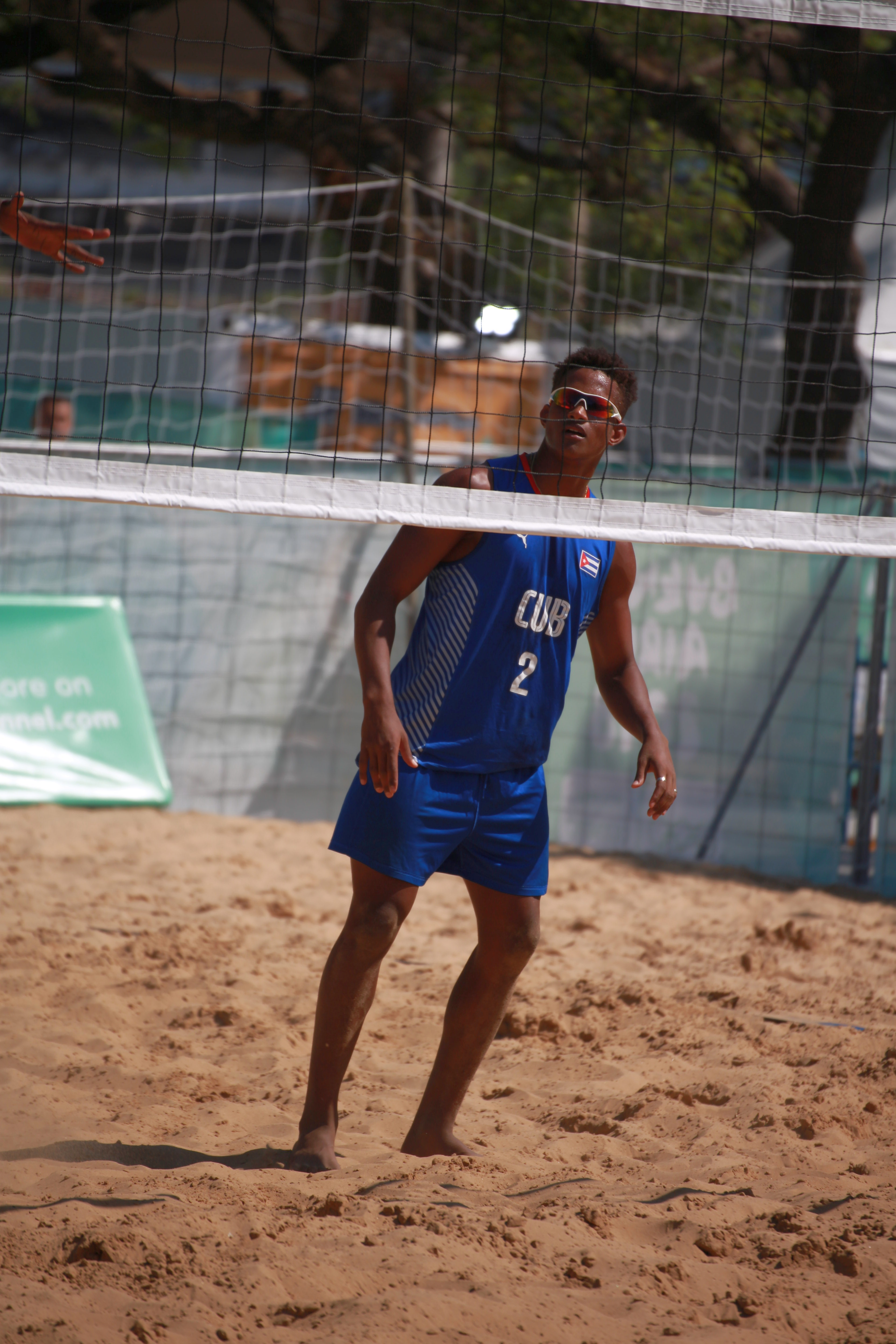

Personal information
- Full name: Jorge Luis Alayo Moliner
- Nationality: Cuban
- Born: 6 June 2001 (age 25)
- Height: 198 cm (6 ft 6 in)

Beach volleyball information

Current teammate
Teammate
Noslen Díaz
Honours
Men's beach volleyball
Representing Cuba
Pan American Games
Silver medal – second place	2023 Santiago	Beach

Jorge Luis Alayo Moliner (Note: In this Spanish name, the first or paternal surname is Alayo and the second or maternal family name is Moliner.) (born 6 June 2001) is a Cuban beach volleyball player. He played with Noslen Díaz at the 2024 Summer Olympics in Paris.
