= Arnaud Gauthier-Rat =

French beach volleyball player

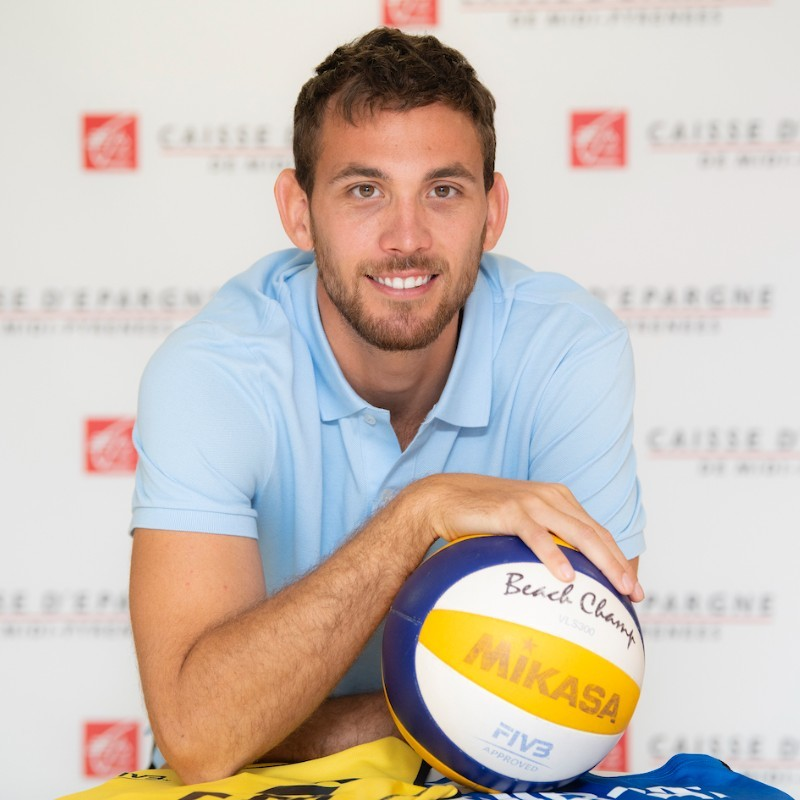

Personal information
- Born: 22 October 1996 (age 30) Saint-Maurice, Val-de-Marne, France
- Height: 6 ft 5 in (196 cm)

Sport
- Sport: Beach volleyball
Medal record
Men's beach volleyball
Representing France
World Championships
Bronze medal – third place	2025 Australia	Beach
European Championships
Bronze medal – third place	2026 Stare Jabłonki	Beach

Arnaud Gauthier-Rat (born 22 October 1996) is a French beach volleyball player. He competed in the 2024 Summer Olympics with Youssef Krou. He won bronze at the 2025 Beach Volleyball World Championships in Adelaide in a new partnership with Téo Rotar to claim France's first ever FIVB World Championship medal.
