= André Stein =

Brazilian beach volleyball player (born 1994)

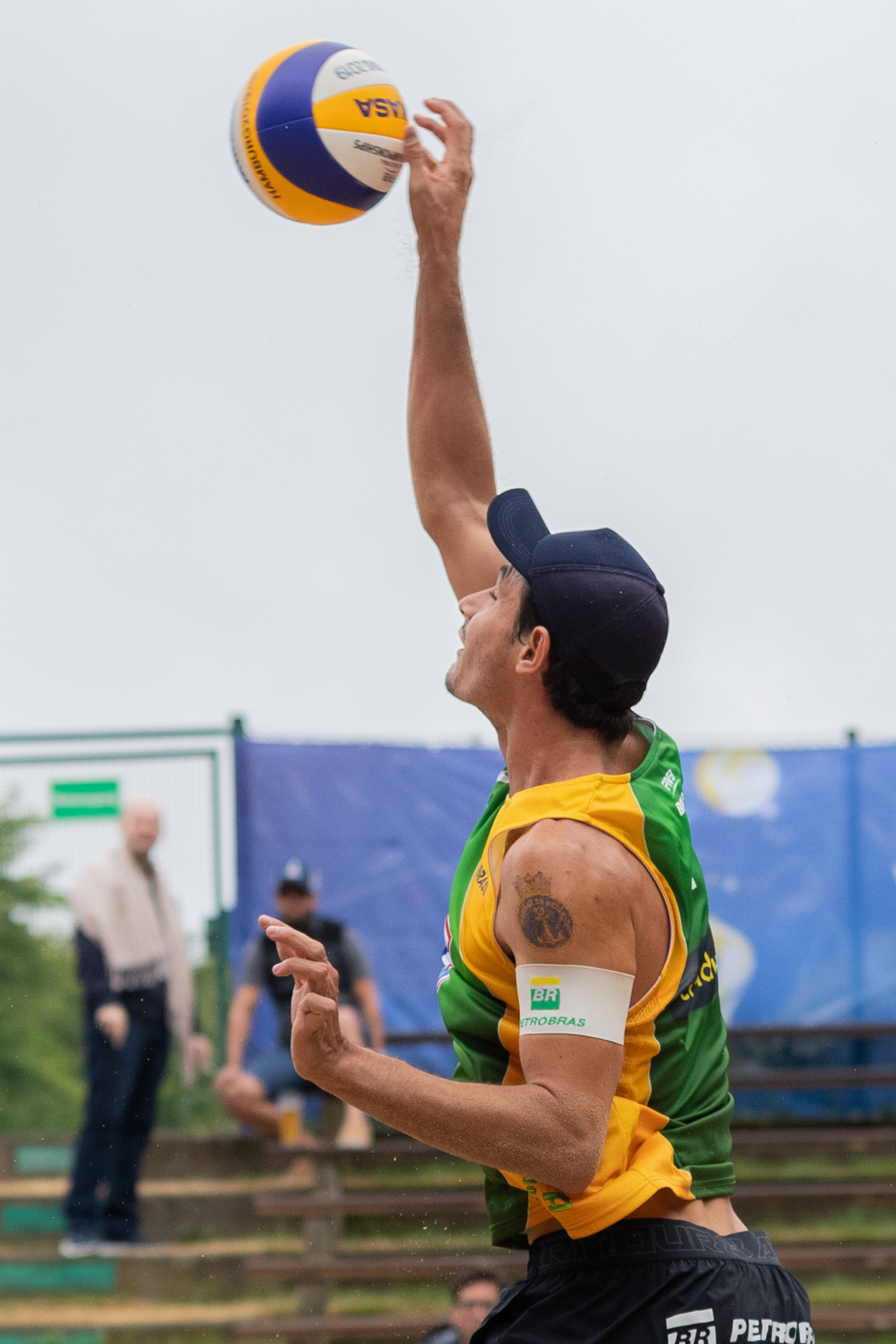
- Stein at the 2019 World Championships

Personal information
- Full name: André Loyola Stein
- Born: 19 August 1994 (age 31) Vila Velha, Brazil
- Height: 6 ft 7 in (201 cm)

Sport
- Sport: Beach volleyball
Medal record
Men's beach volleyball
Representing Brazil
World Championships
Gold medal – first place	2017 Vienna	Beach
Bronze medal – third place	2022 Rome	Beach
Pan American Games
Gold medal – first place	2023 Santiago	Beach

André Loyola Stein (born 19 August 1994) is a Brazilian beach volleyball player. He plays as a blocker.

Stein won a gold medal at the 2017 Beach Volleyball World Championships along with his partner Evandro Oliveira, becoming the youngest player to do so.

Sporting positions
Preceded by Aleksandrs Samoilovs and Jānis Šmēdiņš (LAT)	Men's FIVB Beach Volley World Tour Winner alongside (Brazil) Evandro Oliveira; 2017	Succeeded by Anders Mol and Christian Sørum (NOR)
Awards
Preceded by Aleksandrs Samoilovs and Jānis Šmēdiņš (LAT)	Men's FIVB World Tour "Team of the Year" alongside (Brazil) Evandro Oliveira; 2017	Succeeded by Anders Mol and Christian Sørum (NOR)
