= Noslen Díaz =

Cuban beach volleyball player (born 2002)

Noslen Díaz Amaro

Personal information
- Nationality: Cuban
- Born: 13 August 2002 (age 24)
- Height: 207 cm (6 ft 9 in)

Beach volleyball information

Current teammate
Teammate
Jorge Alayo
Honours
Men's beach volleyball
Representing Cuba
Pan American Games
Silver medal – second place	2023 Santiago	Beach

Noslen Díaz Amaro (born 13 August 2002) is a Cuban beach volleyball player. With Jorge Alayo he played at 2024 Summer Olympics in Paris.
