= 2007 Beach Volleyball World Championships – Women's tournament =

Tournament details
- Host country: Switzerland
- City: Gstaad
- Dates: 24 July – 28 July
- Teams: 48 (from 5 confederations)

Final positions
- Champions: United States; Kerri Walsh Jennings; Misty May-Treanor (1st title)
- Runners-up: China; Tian Jia; Wang Jie
- Third place: Brazil; Larissa França; Juliana Silva
- Fourth place: China; Xue Chen; Zhang Xi

The women's tournament was held from July 24 to July 28, 2007, in Gstaad, Switzerland.

== Preliminary round ==
| Qualified for the Round of 32 as pool winners or runners-up |
| Qualified for the Round of 32 as one of the best four third-placed teams |
| Qualified for the Lucky Losers Playoffs |
| Eliminated |

=== Pool A ===
| Pos | Team | Pld | W | L | Pts | SW | SL | SR | SPW | SPL | SPR | Qualification |
|---|---|---|---|---|---|---|---|---|---|---|---|---|
| 1 | (United States) Walsh–May-Treanor | 3 | 3 | 0 | 6 | 6 | 0 | MAX | 126 | 70 | 1.800 | Round of 32 |
| 2 | (United States) Wacholder–Turner | 3 | 2 | 1 | 5 | 4 | 2 | 2.000 | 107 | 98 | 1.092 | Round of 32 |
| 3 | (South Africa) Augoustides–Naidoo | 3 | 1 | 2 | 4 | 2 | 4 | 0.500 | 99 | 121 | 0.818 | 3rd place ranking |
| 4 | (Japan) Saiki–Kusuhara | 3 | 0 | 3 | 3 | 0 | 6 | 0.000 | 85 | 128 | 0.664 | Eliminated |

=== Pool B ===
| Pos | Team | Pld | W | L | Pts | SW | SL | SR | SPW | SPL | SPR | Qualification |
|---|---|---|---|---|---|---|---|---|---|---|---|---|
| 1 | (Brazil) Larissa–Juliana | 3 | 3 | 0 | 6 | 6 | 0 | MAX | 126 | 83 | 1.518 | Round of 32 |
| 2 | (Germany) Banck–Lahme | 3 | 2 | 1 | 5 | 4 | 3 | 1.333 | 122 | 123 | 0.992 | Round of 32 |
| 3 | (Latvia) Minusa–Jursone | 3 | 1 | 2 | 4 | 3 | 4 | 0.750 | 124 | 135 | 0.919 | 3rd place ranking |
| 4 | (Switzerland) Zumkehr–Skrivan | 3 | 0 | 3 | 3 | 0 | 6 | 0.000 | 95 | 126 | 0.754 | Eliminated |

=== Pool C ===
| Pos | Team | Pld | W | L | Pts | SW | SL | SR | SPW | SPL | SPR | Qualification |
|---|---|---|---|---|---|---|---|---|---|---|---|---|
| 1 | (China) Tian–Wang | 3 | 3 | 0 | 6 | 6 | 1 | 6.000 | 147 | 116 | 1.267 | Round of 32 |
| 2 | (Norway) Maaseide–Glesnes | 3 | 2 | 1 | 5 | 5 | 2 | 2.500 | 131 | 120 | 1.092 | Round of 32 |
| 3 | (Belgium) Van Breedam–Mouha | 3 | 1 | 2 | 4 | 2 | 4 | 0.500 | 117 | 125 | 0.936 | 3rd place ranking |
| 4 | (Netherlands) Keizer–Leenstra | 3 | 0 | 3 | 3 | 0 | 6 | 0.000 | 92 | 126 | 0.730 | Eliminated |

=== Pool D ===
| Pos | Team | Pld | W | L | Pts | SW | SL | SR | SPW | SPL | SPR | Qualification |
|---|---|---|---|---|---|---|---|---|---|---|---|---|
| 1 | (China) Xue–Zhang | 3 | 3 | 0 | 6 | 6 | 1 | 6.000 | 139 | 110 | 1.264 | Round of 32 |
| 2 | (Cuba) Esteves Ribalta–Crespo | 3 | 2 | 1 | 5 | 4 | 2 | 2.000 | 118 | 112 | 1.054 | Round of 32 |
| 3 | (Cuba) Fernández–Larrea | 3 | 1 | 2 | 4 | 3 | 4 | 0.750 | 127 | 131 | 0.969 | 3rd place ranking |
| 4 | (Czech Republic) Celbová–Petrová | 3 | 0 | 3 | 3 | 0 | 6 | 0.000 | 95 | 126 | 0.754 | Eliminated |

=== Pool E ===
| Pos | Team | Pld | W | L | Pts | SW | SL | SR | SPW | SPL | SPR | Qualification |
|---|---|---|---|---|---|---|---|---|---|---|---|---|
| 1 | (Austria) Montagnolli–Swoboda | 3 | 2 | 1 | 5 | 5 | 2 | 2.500 | 130 | 117 | 1.111 | Round of 32 |
| 2 | (Philippines) Pascua–Ilustre | 3 | 2 | 1 | 5 | 4 | 3 | 1.333 | 136 | 134 | 1.015 | Round of 32 |
| 3 | (Australia) Barnett–Cook | 3 | 2 | 1 | 5 | 5 | 4 | 1.250 | 159 | 148 | 1.074 | 3rd place ranking |
| 4 | (Finland) Nyström–Nyström | 3 | 0 | 3 | 3 | 1 | 6 | 0.167 | 114 | 140 | 0.814 | Eliminated |

=== Pool F ===
| Pos | Team | Pld | W | L | Pts | SW | SL | SR | SPW | SPL | SPR | Qualification |
|---|---|---|---|---|---|---|---|---|---|---|---|---|
| 1 | (Germany) Claasen–Röder | 3 | 2 | 1 | 5 | 5 | 3 | 1.667 | 143 | 132 | 1.083 | Round of 32 |
| 2 | (Germany) Goller–Ludwig | 3 | 2 | 1 | 5 | 5 | 4 | 1.250 | 170 | 164 | 1.037 | Round of 32 |
| 3 | (Germany) Pohl–Rau | 3 | 1 | 2 | 4 | 3 | 4 | 0.750 | 125 | 130 | 0.962 | 3rd place ranking |
| 4 | (Italy) Momoli–Gioria | 3 | 1 | 2 | 4 | 3 | 5 | 0.600 | 136 | 148 | 0.919 | Eliminated |

=== Pool G ===
| Pos | Team | Pld | W | L | Pts | SW | SL | SR | SPW | SPL | SPR | Qualification |
|---|---|---|---|---|---|---|---|---|---|---|---|---|
| 1 | (Brazil) Behar–Shelda | 3 | 2 | 1 | 5 | 5 | 2 | 2.500 | 134 | 117 | 1.145 | Round of 32 |
| 2 | (China) Wang–Zuo | 3 | 2 | 1 | 5 | 5 | 3 | 1.667 | 144 | 132 | 1.091 | Round of 32 |
| 3 | (Russia) Uryadova–Shiryaeva | 3 | 2 | 1 | 5 | 4 | 4 | 1.000 | 148 | 155 | 0.955 | 3rd place ranking |
| 4 | (Canada) Lessard–Maxwell | 3 | 0 | 3 | 3 | 1 | 6 | 0.167 | 125 | 147 | 0.850 | Eliminated |

=== Pool H ===
| Pos | Team | Pld | W | L | Pts | SW | SL | SR | SPW | SPL | SPR | Qualification |
|---|---|---|---|---|---|---|---|---|---|---|---|---|
| 1 | (Norway) Håkedal–Tørlen | 3 | 3 | 0 | 6 | 6 | 0 | MAX | 126 | 91 | 1.385 | Round of 32 |
| 2 | (Brazil) Leila–Ana Paula | 3 | 2 | 1 | 5 | 4 | 2 | 2.000 | 116 | 111 | 1.045 | Round of 32 |
| 3 | (Japan) Tanaka–Koizumi | 3 | 1 | 2 | 4 | 2 | 4 | 0.500 | 106 | 124 | 0.855 | 3rd place ranking |
| 4 | (Netherlands) Kadijk–Mooren | 3 | 0 | 3 | 3 | 0 | 6 | 0.000 | 108 | 130 | 0.831 | Eliminated |

=== Pool J ===
| Pos | Team | Pld | W | L | Pts | SW | SL | SR | SPW | SPL | SPR | Qualification |
|---|---|---|---|---|---|---|---|---|---|---|---|---|
| 1 | (United States) Branagh–Youngs | 3 | 3 | 0 | 6 | 6 | 3 | 2.000 | 161 | 155 | 1.039 | Round of 32 |
| 2 | (Canada) Cooke–Martin | 3 | 1 | 2 | 4 | 4 | 4 | 1.000 | 154 | 151 | 1.020 | Round of 32 |
| 3 | (Greece) Koutroumanidou–Tsiartsiani | 3 | 1 | 2 | 4 | 3 | 4 | 0.750 | 131 | 139 | 0.942 | 3rd place ranking |
| 4 | (United States) Boss–Ross | 3 | 1 | 2 | 4 | 3 | 5 | 0.600 | 154 | 155 | 0.994 | Eliminated |

=== Pool K ===
| Pos | Team | Pld | W | L | Pts | SW | SL | SR | SPW | SPL | SPR | Qualification |
|---|---|---|---|---|---|---|---|---|---|---|---|---|
| 1 | (Brazil) Maria Clara–Carolina | 3 | 3 | 0 | 6 | 6 | 2 | 3.000 | 150 | 127 | 1.181 | Round of 32 |
| 2 | (Greece) Karantasiou–Arvaniti | 3 | 2 | 1 | 5 | 5 | 2 | 2.500 | 135 | 125 | 1.080 | Round of 32 |
| 3 | (Georgia (country)) Saka–Rtvelo | 3 | 1 | 2 | 4 | 3 | 5 | 0.600 | 139 | 145 | 0.959 | 3rd place ranking |
| 4 | (Austria) Schwaiger–Schwaiger | 3 | 0 | 3 | 3 | 1 | 6 | 0.167 | 106 | 133 | 0.797 | Eliminated |

=== Pool L ===
| Pos | Team | Pld | W | L | Pts | SW | SL | SR | SPW | SPL | SPR | Qualification |
|---|---|---|---|---|---|---|---|---|---|---|---|---|
| 1 | (Germany) Brink-Abeler–Jurich | 3 | 3 | 0 | 6 | 6 | 0 | MAX | 127 | 100 | 1.270 | Round of 32 |
| 2 | (Spain) Alcón–Matveeva | 3 | 1 | 2 | 4 | 3 | 4 | 0.750 | 130 | 130 | 1.000 | Round of 32 |
| 3 | (France) Barrera–Gemise Fareau | 3 | 1 | 2 | 4 | 3 | 5 | 0.600 | 136 | 148 | 0.919 | 3rd place ranking |
| 4 | (Switzerland) Erni–Graessli | 3 | 1 | 2 | 4 | 2 | 5 | 0.400 | 121 | 136 | 0.890 | Eliminated |

=== Pool M ===
| Pos | Team | Pld | W | L | Pts | SW | SL | SR | SPW | SPL | SPR | Qualification |
|---|---|---|---|---|---|---|---|---|---|---|---|---|
| 1 | (Brazil) Renata–Talita | 3 | 3 | 0 | 6 | 6 | 1 | 6.000 | 132 | 107 | 1.234 | Round of 32 |
| 2 | (France) Faure–Sarpaux | 3 | 2 | 1 | 5 | 5 | 3 | 1.667 | 150 | 120 | 1.250 | Round of 32 |
| 3 | (Switzerland) Kuhn–Schwer | 3 | 1 | 2 | 4 | 3 | 4 | 0.750 | 113 | 136 | 0.831 | 3rd place ranking |
| 4 | (Italy) Gattelli–Perrotta | 3 | 0 | 3 | 3 | 0 | 6 | 0.000 | 94 | 126 | 0.746 | Eliminated |

=== 3rd place ranked teams ===
The eight best third-placed teams advanced to the round of 32.

| Pos | Team | Pld | W | L | Pts | SW | SL | SR | SPW | SPL | SPR | Qualification |
|---|---|---|---|---|---|---|---|---|---|---|---|---|
| 1 | (Australia) Barnett–Cook | 3 | 2 | 1 | 5 | 5 | 4 | 1.250 | 159 | 148 | 1.074 | Round of 32 |
| 2 | (Russia) Uryadova–Shiryaeva | 3 | 2 | 1 | 5 | 4 | 4 | 1.000 | 148 | 155 | 0.955 | Round of 32 |
| 3 | (Cuba) Fernández–Larrea | 3 | 1 | 2 | 4 | 3 | 4 | 0.750 | 127 | 131 | 0.969 | Round of 32 |
| 4 | (Germany) Pohl–Rau | 3 | 1 | 2 | 4 | 3 | 4 | 0.750 | 125 | 130 | 0.962 | Round of 32 |
| 5 | (Greece) Koutroumanidou–Tsiartsiani | 3 | 1 | 2 | 4 | 3 | 4 | 0.750 | 131 | 139 | 0.942 | Round of 32 |
| 6 | (Latvia) Minusa–Jursone | 3 | 1 | 2 | 4 | 3 | 4 | 0.750 | 124 | 135 | 0.919 | Round of 32 |
| 7 | (Switzerland) Kuhn–Schwer | 3 | 1 | 2 | 4 | 3 | 4 | 0.750 | 113 | 136 | 0.831 | Round of 32 |
| 8 | (Georgia (country)) Saka–Rtvelo | 3 | 1 | 2 | 4 | 3 | 5 | 0.600 | 139 | 145 | 0.959 | Round of 32 |
| 9 | (France) Barrera–Gemise Fareau | 3 | 1 | 2 | 4 | 3 | 5 | 0.600 | 136 | 148 | 0.919 | Eliminated |
| 10 | (Belgium) Van Breedam–Mouha | 3 | 1 | 2 | 4 | 2 | 4 | 0.500 | 117 | 125 | 0.936 | Eliminated |
| 11 | (Japan) Tanaka–Koizumi | 3 | 1 | 2 | 4 | 2 | 4 | 0.500 | 106 | 124 | 0.855 | Eliminated |
| 12 | (South Africa) Augoustides–Naidoo | 3 | 1 | 2 | 4 | 2 | 4 | 0.500 | 99 | 121 | 0.818 | Eliminated |

=== Knockout round ===
==== Round of 32 ====
| Date | | Score | | Set 1 | Set 2 | Set 3 |
|---|---|---|---|---|---|---|
| 27 Jul | Koutroumanidou–Tsiartsiani (Greece) | 1–2 | (Brazil) Larissa–Juliana | 15–21 | 21–18 | 10–15 |
| 27 Jul | Esteves Ribalta–Crespo (Cuba) | 1–2 | (China) Wang–Zuo | 21–17 | 13–21 | 12–15 |
| 27 Jul | Renata–Talita (Brazil) | 2–0 | (Spain) Alcón–Matveeva | 21–13 | 21–16 | |
| 27 Jul | Montagnolli–Swoboda (Austria) | 0–2 | (Germany) Pohl–Rau | 19–21 | 16–21 | |
| 27 Jul | Behar–Shelda (Brazil) | 1–2 | (Australia) Barnett–Cook | 21–19 | 12–21 | 13–15 |
| 27 Jul | Maria Clara–Carolina (Brazil) | 2–0 | (Canada) Cooke–Martin | 21–19 | 21–17 | |
| 27 Jul | Karantasiou–Arvaniti (Greece) | 2–1 | (Brazil) Leila–Ana Paula | 19–21 | 25–23 | 15–10 |
| 27 Jul | Tian–Wang (China) | 2–0 | (Latvia) Minusa–Jursone | 21–16 | 21–12 | |
| 27 Jul | Saka–Rtvelo (Georgia (country)) | 0–2 | (China) Xue–Zhang | 14–21 | 16–21 | |
| 27 Jul | Maaseide–Glesnes (Norway) | 2–0 | (Philippines) Pascua–Ilustre | 21–16 | 21–13 | |
| 27 Jul | Branagh–Youngs (United States) | 2–0 | (Germany) Goller–Ludwig | 21–17 | 21–19 | |
| 27 Jul | Håkedal–Tørlen (Norway) | 0–2 | (Cuba) Fernández–Larrea | 17–21 | 17–21 | |
| 27 Jul | Claasen–Röder (Germany) | 2–0 | (Russia) Uryadova–Shiryaeva | 21–13 | 22–20 | |
| 27 Jul | Brink-Abeler–Jurich (Germany) | 2–0 | (Germany) Banck–Lahme | 21–17 | 21–10 | |
| 27 Jul | Wacholder–Turner (United States) | 2–0 | (France) Faure–Sarpaux | 21–19 | 21–16 | |
| 27 Jul | Walsh–May-Treanor (United States) | 2–0 | (Switzerland) Kuhn–Schwer | 21–19 | 21–18 | |

==== Round of 16 ====
| Date | | Score | | Set 1 | Set 2 | Set 3 |
|---|---|---|---|---|---|---|
| 27 Jul | Wang–Zuo (China) | 0–2 | (Brazil) Larissa–Juliana | 17–21 | 14–21 | |
| 27 Jul | Pohl–Rau (Germany) | 2–0 | (Brazil) Renata–Talita | 21–19 | 21–15 | |
| 27 Jul | Maria Clara–Carolina (Brazil) | 2–1 | (Australia) Barnett–Cook | 21–16 | 18–21 | 15–12 |
| 27 Jul | Tian–Wang (China) | 2–0 | (Greece) Karantasiou–Arvaniti | 21–14 | 21–19 | |
| 27 Jul | Maaseide–Glesnes (Norway) | 0–2 | (China) Xue–Zhang | 17–21 | 14–21 | |
| 27 Jul | Fernández–Larrea (Cuba) | 0–2 | (United States) Branagh–Youngs | 19–21 | 15–21 | |
| 27 Jul | Brink-Abeler–Jurich (Germany) | 1–2 | (Germany) Claasen–Röder | 21–16 | 29–31 | 14–16 |
| 27 Jul | Walsh–May-Treanor (United States) | 2–0 | (United States) Wacholder–Turner | 21–17 | 21–16 | |

==== Quarterfinals ====
| Date | | Score | | Set 1 | Set 2 | Set 3 |
|---|---|---|---|---|---|---|
| 27 Jul | Pohl–Rau (Germany) | 0–2 | (Brazil) Larissa–Juliana | 16–21 | 19–21 | |
| 27 Jul | Tian–Wang (China) | 2–0 | (Brazil) Maria Clara–Carolina | 21–15 | 21–19 | |
| 27 Jul | Branagh–Youngs (United States) | 1–2 | (China) Xue–Zhang | 21–17 | 16–21 | 11–15 |
| 27 Jul | Walsh–May-Treanor (United States) | 2–0 | (Germany) Claasen–Röder | 21–10 | 22–20 | |

==== Semifinals ====
| Date | | Score | | Set 1 | Set 2 | Set 3 |
|---|---|---|---|---|---|---|
| 28 Jul | Tian–Wang (China) | 2–1 | (Brazil) Larissa–Juliana | 23–25 | 21–19 | 15–11 |
| 28 Jul | Walsh–May-Treanor (United States) | 2–0 | (China) Xue–Zhang | 21–14 | 21–19 | |

==== Third place match ====
| Date | | Score | | Set 1 | Set 2 | Set 3 |
|---|---|---|---|---|---|---|
| 28 Jul | Xue–Zhang (China) | 1–2 | (Brazil) Larissa–Juliana | 21–19 | 19–21 | 16–18 |

==== Final ====
| Date | | Score | | Set 1 | Set 2 | Set 3 |
|---|---|---|---|---|---|---|
| 28 Jul | Walsh–May-Treanor (United States) | 2–0 | (China) Tian–Wang | 21–16 | 21–10 | |
