= 2005 Beach Volleyball World Championships =

- Dates: 21 June – 26 June

These page shows the results of the Beach volleyball World Championships, held 21–26 June 2005 in Berlin, Germany. It was the fifth official edition of this event, after ten unofficial championships (1987–1996) all held in Rio de Janeiro.

== Men's competition ==
=== Final ranking ===
Rank	Athletes	Seed
1st place, gold medalist(s)	Márcio Araújo and Fábio Luiz Magalhães (BRA)	2
2nd place, silver medalist(s)	Sascha Heyer and Paul Laciga (SUI)	8
3rd place, bronze medalist(s)	Julius Brink and Kjell Schneider (GER)	13
4.	Marvin Polte and Thorsten Schön (GER)	43
5.	Kristjan Kais and Rivo Vesik (EST)	17
5.	Francisco Álvarez and Oney Ramírez (CUB)	31
7.	Martín Conde and José Salema (ARG)	10
7.	Phil Dalhausser and Todd Rogers (USA)	26
9.	Benjamin Insfran and Harley Marques (BRA)	4
9.	Markus Dieckmann and Jonas Reckermann (GER)	5
9.	Roman Arkaev and Dmitri Barsouk (RUS)	14
9.	Conrad Leinemann and Rich VanHuizen (CAN)	28
13.	Franco Neto and Tande Ramos (BRA)	3
13.	Christoph Dieckmann and Andreas Scheuerpflug (GER)	7
13.	Iver Horrem and Bard-Inge Pettersen (NOR)	18
13.	Jake Gibb and Stein Metzger (USA)	38
17.	Emanuel Rego and Ricardo Santos (BRA)	1
17.	Markus Egger and Martin Laciga (SUI)	6
17.	Patrick Heuscher and Stefan Kobel (SUI)	9
17.	Jørre Kjemperud and Tarjei Skarlund (NOR)	12
17.	Dain Blanton and Kevin Wong (USA)	22
17.	Emiel Boersma and Richard Kogel (NED)	32
17.	Martin Engvik and Kjell Göranson (NOR)	34
17.	João Brenha and Miguel Maia (POR)	48
25.	Jochem de Gruijter and Gijs Ronnes (NED)	15
25.	Nikolas Berger and Clemens Doppler (AUT)	19
25.	Linyin Xu and Qiang Xu (CHN)	20
25.	David Klemperer and Eric Koreng (GER)	21
25.	Peter Gartmayer and Robert Nowotny (AUT)	27
25.	Juan García Thompson and Javier Luna (ESP)	35
25.	Jason Lochhead and Kirk Pitman (NZL)	41
25.	Kentaro Asahi and Satoshi Watanabe (JPN)	44
33.	Andrew Schacht and Josh Slack (AUS)	11
33.	Pablo Herrera and Raul Mesa (ESP)	16
33.	Mariano Baracetti and Pedro Depiaggio (ARG)	23
33.	Julien Prosser and Brett Richardson (AUS)	24
33.	John Child and Mark Heese (CAN)	25
33.	Ramón Hernández and Raúl Papaleo (PUR)	29
33.	Juan Rossell and Wilfredo Villar (CUB)	30
33.	Vegard Høidalen and Terje Øvergaard (NOR)	33
33.	Daniel Krug and Mischa Urbatzka (GER)	36
33.	Thomas Kroger and Niklas Rademacher (GER)	37
33.	Ahren Cadieux and Miguel Domingo (CAN)	39
33.	Björn Berg and Robert Svensson (SWE)	40
33.	Stéphane Canet and Mathieu Hamel (FRA)	42
33.	Taichi Morikawa and Katsuhiro Shiratori (JPN)	45
33.	Florian Gosch and Bernhard Strauss (AUT)	46
33.	Kevin Ces and Julien Dugrip (FRA)	47

== Women's competition ==
=== Final ranking ===
Rank	Athletes	Seed
1st place, gold medalist(s)	Misty May-Treanor and Kerri Walsh (USA)	19
2nd place, silver medalist(s)	Juliana Felisberta and Larissa França (BRA)	1
3rd place, bronze medalist(s)	Tian Jia and Wang Fei (CHN)	5
4.	Dalixia Fernández and Tamara Larrea (CUB)	13
5.	Shelda Bede and Adriana Behar (BRA)	2
5.	Wang Lu and Li Ying (CHN)	26
7.	Rachel Wacholder and Elaine Youngs (USA)	3
7.	Rebekka Kadijk and Merel Mooren (NED)	15
9.	Ana Paula Connelly and Leila Barros (BRA)	4
9.	Stephanie Pohl and Okka Rau (GER)	6
9.	Vassiliki Arvaniti and Vasso Karadassiou (GRE)	8
9.	Efthalia Koutroumanidou and Maria Tsiartsiani (GRE)	23
13.	Susanne Lahme and Danja Müsch (GER)	9
13.	Simone Kuhn and Lea Schwer (SUI)	11
13.	Rieke Brink-Abeler and Hella Jurich (GER)	12
13.	Milagros Crespo and Imara Esteves (CUB)	13
17.	Agatha Bednarczuk and Sandra Pires (BRA)	7
17.	Ethel-Julie Arjona and Virginie Kadjo (FRA)	16
17.	Nila Håkedal and Ingrid Tørlen (NOR)	17
17.	Sanne Keizer and Marrit Leenstra (NED)	22
17.	Marie-Andrée Lessard and Sarah Maxwell (CAN)	37
17.	Mayra García and Hilda Gaxiola (MEX)	41
17.	Helke Claasen and Antje Roder (GER)	47
17.	Sara Goller and Laura Ludwig (GER)	48
25.	Daniela Gattelli and Lucilla Perrotta (ITA)	10
25.	Angela Clarke and Kylie Gerlic (AUS)	18
25.	Laura Bruschini and Diletta Lunardi (ITA)	21
25.	Guylaine Dumont and Caroline Fiset (CAN)	6
25.	Natalie Cook and Summer Lochowicz (AUS)	29
25.	Tatiana Barrera and Eva Hamzaoui (FRA)	6
25.	Ines Pianka and Jana Vollmer (GER)	35
25.	Mika Teru Saiki and Ryo Tokuno (GER)	6
33.	Lina Yanchulova and Petia Yanchulova (BUL)	14
33.	Jennifer Boss and Holly McPeak (USA)	6
33.	Sara Montagnolli and Sabine Swoboda (AUT)	24
33.	Chiaki Kusuhara and Satoko Urata (JPN)	25
33.	Hu Xiaoyan and Zhang Xi (CHN)	28
33.	Emilia Nyström and Erika Nyström (FIN)	30
33.	Kathrine Maaseide and Kristine Wiig (NOR)	33
33.	Nadia Erni and Karin Trussel (SUI)	34
33.	Annie Martin and Marie-Christine Pruneau (CAN)	36
33.	Nadia Campisi and Clara Lozano (ESP)	39
33.	Ester Alcón and Olena Zalubovskaya (ESP)	40
33.	Chrisi Gschweidl and Barbara Hansel (AUT)	42
33.	Julia Mandaña and Cati Pol (ESP)	43
33.	Doris Schwaiger and Stefanie Schwaiger (AUT)	44
33.	Nicoletta Luciani and Annamaria Solazzi (ITA)	45
33.	Eiko Koizumi and Shinako Tanaka (JPN)	46
