= 2003 Beach Volleyball World Championships =

- Dates: 7 October – 12 October

These page shows the results of the IV Beach Volleyball World Championships, held from October 7 to October 12, 2003, in Rio de Janeiro, Brazil. It was the fourth official edition of this event, after ten unofficial championships (1987–1996) all held in Rio de Janeiro.

== Men's competition ==
=== Final ranking ===
Rank	Athletes	Seed
1st place, gold medalist(s)	Emanuel Rego and Ricardo Santos (BRA)	1
2nd place, silver medalist(s)	Dax Holdren and Stein Metzger (USA)	15
3rd place, bronze medalist(s)	Márcio Araújo and Benjamin Insfran (BRA)	2
4.	João Brenha and Miguel Maia (POR)	13
5.	Martin Laciga and Paul Laciga (SUI)	3
5.	Patrick Heuscher and Stefan Kobel (SUI)	6
5.	Dain Blanton and Jeff Nygaard (USA)	7
5.	Pedro Brazão and Frederico Souza (BRA)	32
9.	Christoph Dieckmann and Andreas Scheuerpflug (GER)	9
9.	Harley Marques and Franco Neto (BRA)	11
9.	Vegard Høidalen and Jørre Kjemperud (NOR)	16
9.	Eric Fonoimoana and Kevin Wong (USA)	20
9.	Björn Berg and Simon Dahl (SWE)	21
9.	Julien Prosser and Mark Williams (AUS)	26
9.	David Klemperer and Niklas Rademacher (GER)	35
9.	Ramón Hernández and Raúl Papaleo (PUR)	36
17.	Markus Dieckmann and Jonas Reckermann (GER)	4
17.	Markus Egger and Sascha Heyer (SUI)	5
17.	Nikolas Berger and Clemens Doppler (AUT)	8
17.	Mariano Baracetti and Martín Conde (ARG)	17
17.	Francisco Álvarez and Juan Rossell (CUB)	18
17.	Iver Horrem and Bjørn Maaseide (NOR)	23
17.	Jody Holden and Conrad Leinemann (CAN)	24
17.	Fábio Luiz Magalhães and Paulo Emílio Silva (BRA)	25
17.	Antonio Cotrino and Juan García Thompson (ESP)	27
17.	Javier Bosma and Pablo Herrera (ESP)	28
17.	Roman Arkaev and Dmitri Barsouk (RUS)	29
17.	Pedro Cunha and Tande Ramos (BRA)	30
17.	Rogério Ferreira and Anselmo Sigoli (BRA)	31
17.	Jörg Ahmann and Axel Hager (GER)	39
17.	Richard Kogel and Sander Mulder (NED)	40
17.	Riccardo Fenili and Fabio Galli (ITA)	46
33.	Todd Rogers and Sean Scott (USA)	12
33.	Jefferson Bellaguarda and Juca Dultra (BRA)	17
33.	Guilherm Deulofeu and Ogier Molinier (FRA)	38
33.	Katsuhiro Shiratori and Satoshi Watanabe (JPN)	43
37.	Paul Schroffenegger and Thomas Schroffenegger (AUT)	14
37.	Stéphane Canet and Mathieu Hamel (FRA)	19
37.	Manuel Carrasco and Raul Mesa (ESP)	22
37.	Peter Gartmayer and Robert Nowotny (AUT)	33
37.	John Child and Mark Heese (CAN)	34
37.	Max Backer and Emiel Boersma (NED)	37
37.	Kristjan Kais and Rivo Vesik (EST)	41
37.	Kevin Ces and Yannick Salvetti (FRA)	42
37.	Kentaro Asahi and Koichi Nishimura (JPN)	44
37.	Andreas Gilbertsson and Robert Svensson (SWE)	45
37.	Pavlos Beligratis and Thanassis Michalopoulos (GRE)	47
37.	Mário Silva and Miguel Xisto (ANG)	37

== Women's competition ==
=== Final ranking ===
Rank	Athletes	Seed
1st place, gold medalist(s)	Misty May-Treanor and Kerri Walsh (USA)	1
2nd place, silver medalist(s)	Shelda Bede and Adriana Behar (BRA)	3
3rd place, bronze medalist(s)	Natalie Cook and Nicole Sanderson (AUS)	5
4.	Annett Davis and Jenny Johnson Jordan (USA)	7
5.	Ana Paula Connelly and Sandra Pires (BRA)	2
5.	Holly McPeak and Elaine Youngs (USA)	6
5.	Simone Kuhn and Nicole Schnyder-Benoit (SUI)	8
5.	Shaylyn Bede and Renata Ribeiro (BRA)	41
9.	Eva Celbová and Sona Novaková (CZE)	12
9.	Dianne DeNecochea and Nancy Mason (USA)	13
9.	Stephanie Pohl and Okka Rau (GER)	14
9.	Wang Lu and You Wenhui (CHN)	24
9.	Lina Yanchulova and Petia Yanchulova (BUL)	30
9.	Guylaine Dumont and Annie Martin (CAN)	35
9.	Helke Claasen and Judith Deister (GER)	40
9.	Juliana Silva and Jackie Silva (BRA)	9
17.	Tian Jia and Wang Fei (CHN)	4
17.	Vasso Karadassiou and Efi Sfyri (GRE)	9
17.	Susanne Lahme and Danja Müsch (GER)	10
17.	Dalixia Fernández and Tamara Larrea (CUB)	11
17.	Vassiliki Arvaniti and Efthalia Koutroumanidou (GRE)	15
17.	Leigh-Ann Naidoo and Julia Willand (RSA)	16
17.	Rebekka Kadijk and Marrit Leenstra (NED)	18
17.	Alexandra Fonseca and Tatiana Minello (BRA)	19
17.	Mayra García and Hilda Gaxiola (MEX)	17
17.	Andrea Ahmann and Jana Vollmer (GER)	21
17.	Angela Clarke and Kylie Gerlic (AUS)	22
17.	Nila Håkedal and Ingrid Tørlen (NOR)	23
17.	Chiaki Kusuhara and Ryo Tokuno (JPN)	28
17.	Anouk Boileau and Julie Morin (CAN)	34
17.	Tatiana Barerra and Claire Jaouen (FRA)	44
17.	Larissa França and Ana Richa (BRA)	47
33.	Daniela Gattelli and Lucilla Perrotta (ITA)	25
33.	Gabriele Jobst and Patricia Stragliotto (CAN)	31
33.	Barbara Hansel and Sara Montagnolli (AUT)	32
33.	Mônica Rodrigues and Ângela Vieira (BRA)	36
37.	Nancy Gougeon and Wanda Guenette (CAN)	17
37.	Milagros Crespo and Imara Esteves (CUB)	26
37.	Ethel-Julie Arjona and Virginie Kadjo (FRA)	27
37.	Susanne Glesnes and Kathrine Maaseide (NOR)	6
37.	Krisztina Nagy and Anita Petho (HUN)	33
37.	Laura Bruschini and Annamaria Solazzi (ITA)	37
37.	Ester Alcón and Cati Pol (ESP)	38
37.	Katerina Nikolaidou and Maria Tsiartsiani (GRE)	39
37.	Cecilie Josefsen and Kristine Wiig (NOR)	42
37.	Annika Granström and Angelica Ljungquist (SWE)	43
37.	Rii Seike and Misaki Yamakawa (JPN)	45
