= 2009 Beach Volleyball World Championships – Women's tournament =

Tournament details
- Host country: Norway
- City: Stavanger
- Dates: 26 June – 5 July
- Teams: 48 (from 5 confederations)

Final positions
- Champions: United States; April Ross; Jennifer Kessy (1st title)
- Runners-up: Brazil; Larissa França; Juliana Silva
- Third place: Brazil; Talita Antunes; Maria Elisa Antonelli
- Fourth place: Brazil; Ana Paula Henkel; Shelda Bede

The women's tournament was held from June 26 to July 5, 2011, in Stavanger, Norway.

== Preliminary round ==
Qualified for the Round of 32 as pool winners or runners-up
Qualified for the Round of 32 as one of the best four third-placed teams
Qualified for the Lucky Losers Playoffs
Eliminated

=== Pool A ===
Pos	Team	Pld	W	L	Pts	SW	SL	SR	SPW	SPL	SPR	Qualification
1	(United States) Ross – Kessy	3	3	0	6	6	0	MAX	126	76	1.658	Round of 32
2	(Latvia) Minusa – Jursone	3	2	1	5	4	3	1.333	124	116	1.069	Round of 32
3	(United States) Fendrick – Ivy	3	1	2	4	3	4	0.750	118	132	0.894	
4	(Norway) Aas – Bjørkesett	3	0	3	3	0	6	0.000	82	126	0.651	

=== Pool B ===
Pos	Team	Pld	W	L	Pts	SW	SL	SR	SPW	SPL	SPR	Qualification
1	(Brazil) Talita – Antonelli	3	3	0	6	6	2	3.000	160	142	1.127	Round of 32
2	(China) Xue – Zhang	3	2	1	5	4	3	1.333	133	116	1.147	Round of 32
3	(Netherlands) Remmers – Stiekema	3	1	2	4	4	5	0.800	150	165	0.909	Round of 32
4	(Russia) Bratkova – Ukolova	3	0	3	3	2	6	0.333	129	149	0.866	

=== Pool C ===
Pos	Team	Pld	W	L	Pts	SW	SL	SR	SPW	SPL	SPR	Qualification
1	(Brazil) Larissa – Juliana	3	3	0	6	6	0	MAX	130	97	1.340	Round of 32
2	(Switzerland) Kuhn – Zumkehr	3	2	1	5	4	2	2.000	121	99	1.222	Round of 32
3	(Czech Republic) Klapalova – Petrova	3	1	2	4	2	4	0.500	111	117	0.949	
4	(Greece) Koutroumanidou – Argiropoulou	3	0	3	3	0	6	0.000	77	126	0.611	

=== Pool D ===
Pos	Team	Pld	W	L	Pts	SW	SL	SR	SPW	SPL	SPR	Qualification
1	(United States) Branagh – Youngs	3	3	0	6	6	1	6.000	140	111	1.261	Round of 32
2	(Germany) Banck – Günther	3	2	1	5	4	3	1.333	130	137	0.949	Round of 32
3	(Canada) Martin – Lessard	3	1	2	4	4	4	1.000	157	144	1.090	Round of 32
4	(United Kingdom) Dampney – Mullin	3	0	3	3	0	6	0.000	91	126	0.722	

=== Pool E ===
Pos	Team	Pld	W	L	Pts	SW	SL	SR	SPW	SPL	SPR	Qualification
1	(Brazil) Ana Paula – Shelda	3	3	0	6	6	0	MAX	126	82	1.537	Round of 32
2	(Greece) Arvaniti – Tsiartsiani	3	2	1	5	4	2	2.000	118	98	1.204	Round of 32
3	(Austria) Montagnolli – Hansel	3	1	2	4	2	4	0.500	95	119	0.798	
4	(United Kingdom) Boulton – Johns	3	0	3	3	0	6	0.000	86	126	0.683	

=== Pool F ===
Pos	Team	Pld	W	L	Pts	SW	SL	SR	SPW	SPL	SPR	Qualification
1	(United States) Turner – Akers	3	2	1	5	4	3	1.333	137	128	1.070	Round of 32
2	(Switzerland) Forrer – Schmocker	3	2	1	5	4	2	2.000	116	109	1.064	Round of 32
3	(France) Giaoui – Hamzaoui	3	1	2	4	3	5	0.600	140	152	0.921	
4	(Sweden) Lundqvist – Ljungquist	3	1	2	4	3	4	0.750	125	129	0.969	

=== Pool G ===
Pos	Team	Pld	W	L	Pts	SW	SL	SR	SPW	SPL	SPR	Qualification
1	(Germany) Holtwick – Semmler	3	2	1	5	5	2	2.500	135	112	1.205	Round of 32
2	(Italy) Gloria – Momoli	3	2	1	5	4	3	1.333	130	137	0.949	Round of 32
3	(Cuba) Fernandez Grasset – Esteves Ribalta	3	2	1	5	4	3	1.333	137	129	1.062	Round of 32
4	(Germany) Lehmann – Sude	3	0	3	3	1	6	0.167	113	137	0.825	

=== Pool H ===
Pos	Team	Pld	W	L	Pts	SW	SL	SR	SPW	SPL	SPR	Qualification
1	(Brazil) Maria Clara – Carol	3	3	0	6	6	2	3.000	154	124	1.242	Round of 32
2	(Belgium) van Breedam – Mouha	3	2	1	5	5	3	1.667	144	122	1.180	Round of 32
3	(Netherlands) Mooren – Wesselink	3	1	2	4	3	4	0.750	116	123	0.943	Round of 32
4	(Australia) Palmer – Jensen	3	0	3	3	1	6	0.167	94	139	0.676	

=== Pool I ===
Pos	Team	Pld	W	L	Pts	SW	SL	SR	SPW	SPL	SPR	Qualification
1	(Germany) Pohl – Rau	3	2	1	5	4	2	2.000	84	70	1.200	Round of 32
2	(Georgia (country)) Saka – Rtvelo	3	2	1	5	4	3	1.333	113	119	0.950	Round of 32
3	(Norway) Nila – Ingrid	3	2	1	5	5	2	2.500	97	90	1.078	Round of 32
4	(Denmark) Andreasen – Vestergaard	3	0	3	3	0	6	0.000	91	126	0.722	

=== Pool J ===
Pos	Team	Pld	W	L	Pts	SW	SL	SR	SPW	SPL	SPR	Qualification
1	(Germany) Goller – Ludwig	3	3	0	6	6	1	6.000	139	99	1.404	Round of 32
2	(China) Zhang Xi – Huang Y.	3	2	1	5	4	3	1.333	129	138	0.935	Round of 32
3	(Mexico) Candelas – García	3	1	2	4	4	4	1.000	146	143	1.021	Round of 32
4	(Finland) Nyström – Nyström	3	0	3	3	0	6	0.000	94	126	0.746	

=== Pool K ===
Pos	Team	Pld	W	L	Pts	SW	SL	SR	SPW	SPL	SPR	Qualification
1	(Netherlands) van Iersel – Keizer	3	2	1	5	5	2	2.500	149	134	1.112	Round of 32
2	(France) Barrera – Sarpaux	3	2	1	5	4	3	1.333	132	120	1.100	Round of 32
3	(Czech Republic) Nováková – Hajeckova	3	2	1	5	5	3	1.667	157	145	1.083	Round of 32
4	(Spain) Alcon – Matveeva	3	0	3	3	0	6	0.000	87	126	0.690	

=== Pool L ===
Pos	Team	Pld	W	L	Pts	SW	SL	SR	SPW	SPL	SPR	Qualification
1	(Austria) Schwaiger – Schwaiger	3	3	0	6	6	1	6.000	138	110	1.255	Round of 32
2	(Norway) Maaseide – Kongshavn	3	2	1	5	4	3	1.333	131	129	1.016	Round of 32
3	(Ukraine) Osheyko – Baburina	3	1	2	4	4	4	1.000	149	145	1.028	Round of 32
4	(Switzerland) Graessli – Guerra Arias	3	0	3	3	0	6	0.000	93	127	0.732	

=== Best Third Places ===
Pos	Grp	Team	Pld	W	L	Pts	SW	SL	SR	SPW	SPL	SPR	Qualification
1	I	(Norway) Nila – Ingrid	3	2	1	5	5	2	2.500	97	90	1.078	Round of 32
2	K	(Czech Republic) Nováková – Hajeckova	3	2	1	5	5	3	1.667	157	145	1.083	Round of 32
3	G	(Cuba) Fernandez Grasset – Esteves Ribalta	3	2	1	5	4	3	1.333	137	129	1.062	Round of 32
4	D	(Canada) Martin – Lessard	3	1	2	4	4	4	1.000	157	144	1.090	Round of 32
5	L	(Ukraine) Osheyko – Baburina	3	1	2	4	4	4	1.000	149	145	1.028	Round of 32
6	J	(Mexico) Candelas – García	3	1	2	4	4	4	1.000	146	143	1.021	Round of 32
7	B	(Netherlands) Remmers – Stiekema	3	1	2	4	4	5	0.800	150	165	0.909	Round of 32
8	H	(Netherlands) Mooren – Wesselink	3	1	2	4	3	4	0.750	116	123	0.943	Round of 32
9	A	(United States) Fendrick – Ivy	3	1	2	4	3	4	0.750	118	132	0.894	
10	F	(France) Giaoui – Hamzaoui	3	1	2	4	3	5	0.600	140	152	0.921	
11	C	(Czech Republic) Klapalova – Petrova	3	1	2	4	2	4	0.500	111	117	0.949	
12	E	(Austria) Montagnolli – Hansel	3	1	2	4	2	4	0.500	95	119	0.798	

=== Play-off ===
==== Round of 32 ====
Date		Score		Set 1	Set 2	Set 3	Set 4	Set 5	Total
2 July	Mooren – Wesselink (Netherlands)	0–2	(Brazil) Talita – Antonelli	12:21	13:21				25:42
2 July	van Breedam – Mouha (Belgium)	2–0	(Latvia) Minusa – Jursone	21:19	21:11				42:30
2 July	Schwaiger – Schwaiger (Austria)	2–1	(Italy) Gloria – Momoli	18:21	23:21	15:13			56:55
2 July	Holtwick – Semmler (Germany)	0–2	(Czech Republic) Nováková – Hajeckova	16:21	16:21				32:42
2 July	Maria Clara – Carol (Brazil)	2–1	(Norway) Nila – Ingrid	16:21	21:16	15:7			52:44
2 July	van Iersel – Keizer (Netherlands)	2–0	(Norway) Maaseide – Kongshavn	26:24	21:18				47:42
2 July	Kuhn – Zumkehr (Switzerland)	0–2	(China) Xue – Zhang	20:22	15:21				45:43
2 July	Larissa – Juliana (Brazil)	2–0	(Mexico) Candelas – García	21:10	21:15				42:25
2 July	Remmers – Stiekema (Netherlands)	0–2	(United States) Branagh – Youngs	18:21	10:21				28:42
2 July	Forrer – Schmocker (Switzerland)	0–2	(Georgia (country)) Saka – Rtvelo	14:21	16:21				30:42
2 July	Pohl – Rau (Germany)	0–2	(China) Zhang Xi – Huang Y.	15:21	15:21				30:42
2 July	Ana Paula – Shelda (Brazil)	2–1	(Cuba) Fernandez Grasset – Esteves Ribalta	21:14	19:21	17:15			57:50
2 July	Turner – Akers (United States)	2–1	(Canada) Martin – Lessard	18:21	24:22	17:15			59:58
2 July	Goller – Ludwig (Germany)	2–0	(Germany) Banck – Günther	21:12	21:16				42:28
2 July	Arvaniti – Tsiartsiani (Greece)	2–0	(France) Barrera – Sarpaux	21:17	21:15				42:32
2 July	Ross – Kessy (United States)	2–0	(Ukraine) Osheyko – Baburina	21:17	21:10				42:27

==== Round of 16 ====
Date		Score		Set 1	Set 2	Set 3	Set 4	Set 5	Total
3 July	van Breedam – Mouha (Belgium)	0–2	(Brazil) Talita – Antonelli	15:21	15:21				30:42
3 July	Nováková – Hajeckova (Czech Republic)	0–2	(Austria) Schwaiger – Schwaiger	15:21	19:21				34:42
3 July	van Iersel – Keizer (Netherlands)	2–1	(Brazil) Maria Clara – Carol	19:21	21:19	15:13			55:53
3 July	Larissa – Juliana (Brazil)	2–0	(China) Xue – Zhang	21:16	21:17				42:33
3 July	Saka – Rtvelo (Georgia (country))	0–2	(United States) Branagh – Youngs	12:21	14:21				26:42
3 July	Ana Paula – Shelda (Brazil)	2–0	(China) Zhang Xi – Huang Y.	22:20	21:16				43:36
3 July	Goller – Ludwig (Germany)	1–2	(United States) Turner – Akers	21:17	21:23	11:15			53:55
3 July	Ross – Kessy (United States)	2–0	(Greece) Arvaniti – Tsiartsiani	21:11	21:12				42:23

==== Quarterfinals ====
Date		Score		Set 1	Set 2	Set 3	Set 4	Set 5	Total
3 July	Schwaiger – Schwaiger (Austria)	0–2	(Brazil) Talita – Antonelli	17:21	16:21				33:42
3 July	Larissa – Juliana (Brazil)	2–0	(Netherlands) van Iersel – Keizer	21:13	21:16				42:29
3 July	Ana Paula – Shelda (Brazil)	2–1	(United States) Branagh – Youngs	17:21	22:20	15:12			54:53
3 July	Ross – Kessy (United States)	2–1	(United States) Turner – Akers	17:21	21:12	15:9			53:42

==== Semifinals ====
Date		Score		Set 1	Set 2	Set 3	Set 4	Set 5	Total
4 July	Larissa – Juliana (Brazil)	2–1	(Brazil) Talita – Antonelli	21:17	18:21	15:13			54:51
4 July	Ross – Kessy (United States)	2 –1	(Brazil) Ana Paula – Shelda	28:26	15:21	15:9			58:56

==== Bronze medal Match ====
Date		Score		Set 1	Set 2	Set 3	Set 4	Set 5	Total
4 July	Ana Paula – Shelda (Brazil)	0–2	(Brazil) Talita – Antonelli	13:21	16:21				29:42

==== Gold medal Match ====
Date		Score		Set 1	Set 2	Set 3	Set 4	Set 5	Total
4 July	Ross – Kessy (United States)	2–0	(Brazil) Larissa – Juliana	30:28	23:21				53:49

== Final ranking ==
RANK	NAME ATHLETES	SEED
1st place, gold medalist(s)	April Ross and Jennifer Kessy (USA)	1
2nd place, silver medalist(s)	Larissa França and Juliana Felisberta (BRA)	3
3rd place, bronze medalist(s)	Talita Antunes and Maria Antonelli (BRA)	2
4.	Ana Paula Connelly and Shelda Bede (BRA)	5
5.	Nicole Branagh and Elaine Youngs (USA)	4
5.	Tyra Turner and Angie Akers (USA)	6
5.	Doris Schwaiger and Stefanie Schwaiger (AUT)	12
5.	Marleen van Iersel and Sanne Keizer (NED)	14
9.	Maria Clara Salgado Rufino and Carolina Solberg Salgado (BRA)	8
9.	Sara Goller and Laura Ludwig (GER)	10
9.	Soňa Nováková and Lenka Hajeckova (CZE)	11
9.	Zhang Xi and Huang Ying (CHN)	15
9.	Liesbet Van Breedam and Liesbeth Mouha (BEL)	17
9.	Vassiliki Arvaniti and Maria Tsiartsiani (GRE)	20
9.	Xue Chen and Zhang Ying (CHN)	23
9.	Cristine "Saka" Santanna and Andrezza "Rtvelo" Martins (GEO)	33
17.	Katrin Holtwick and Ilka Semmler (GER)	7
17.	Nila Håkedal and Ingrid Tørlen (NOR)	9
17.	Kathrine Maaseide and Janne Kongshavn (NOR)	13
17.	Stephanie Pohl and Okka Rau (GER)	16
17.	Daniela Gloria and Giulia Momoli (ITA)	18
17.	Geeske Banck and Anja Günther (GER)	21
17.	Inguna Minusa and Inese Jursone (LAT)	24
17.	Daniëlle Remmers and Michelle Stiekema (NED)	26
17.	Simone Kuhn and Nadine Zumkehr (SUI)	27
17.	Annie Martin and Marie-Andrée Lessard (CAN)	28
17.	Bibiana Candelas and Mayra García (MEX)	34
17.	Tatiana Barrera and Virginie Sarpaux (FRA)	35
17.	Galyna Osheyko and Svitlana Baburina (UKR)	37
17.	Merel Mooren and Maloes Wesselink (NED)	41
17.	Dalixia Fernandez Grasset and Imara Esteves Ribalta (CUB)	42
17.	Isabelle Forrer and Sarah Schmocker (SUI)	43
33.	Hana Klapalova and Tereza Petrova (CZE)	22
33.	Lauren Fendrick and Ashley Ivy (USA)	25
33.	Sara Montagnolli and Barbara Hansel (AUT)	29
33.	Deborah Giaoui and Eva Hamzaoui (FRA)	30
37.	Karin Lundqvist and Angelica Ljungquist (SWE)	19
37.	Claudia Lehmann and Julia Sude (GER)	31
37.	Becchara Palmer and Heike Jensen (AUS)	32
37.	Muriel Graessli and Tanya Guerra Arias-Schmocker (SUI)	36
37.	Ester Alcon and Olga Matveeva (ESP)	38
37.	Erika Nyström and Emilia Nyström (FIN)	39
37.	Stine Andreasen and Lotte Vestergaard (DEN)	40
37.	Lucy Boulton and Denise Johns (GBR)	44
37.	Zara Dampney and Shauna Mullin (GBR)	45
37.	Efthalia Koutroumanidou and Eydoxia Argiropoulou (GRE)	46
37.	Maria Bratkova and Evgenia Ukolova (RUS)	47
37.	Ragnhild Aas and Siri Bjørkesett (NOR)	48
