= Beach volleyball at the 2008 Summer Olympics – Women's tournament =

Women's beach volleyball at the Games of the XXIX Olympiad
- Venue: Beach Volleyball Ground
- Dates: August 9–21
- Competitors: 48 from 17 nations

Medalists
| 1st place, gold medalist(s) | | Kerri Walsh Jennings; Misty May-Treanor | United States |
| 2nd place, silver medalist(s) | | Tian Jia; Wang Jie | China |
| 3rd place, bronze medalist(s) | | Xue Chen; Zhang Xi | China |

The women's beach volleyball tournament at the 2008 Summer Olympics in Beijing was held from August 9 to August 21, at the Beach Volleyball Ground at Chaoyang Park.

Each of the 24 pairs in the tournament was placed in one of six groups of four teams apiece, and played a round-robin within that pool. The top two teams in each pool advanced to the Round of 16. The six third-place teams were ranked against each other, with ties being broken by the ratio of points won to lost. The best two advanced to the Round of 16, while the other four played two matches (#3 vs. #6 and #4 vs. #5) with the winners of those two matches advancing as well. The losers of those matches, along with the fourth-place teams in each group, were eliminated.

The 16 teams that advanced to the elimination rounds played a single-elimination tournament with a bronze medal match between the semifinal losers.

== Qualification ==
The top eight finishes that a team has from January 1, 2007, to July 20, 2008, on the Swatch FIVB World Tour (2007 and 2008), SWATCH FIVB World Championships (2007) and on FIVB recognised Continental Championship Finals, counts towards Olympic qualification for the Beijing 2008 Olympic Games.

There are 24 teams competing at the Olympic Games, with a maximum of two teams per country.

The United States had four teams in the top 8 of the FIVB Beach Volleyball Olympic Ranking, Brazil had seven teams in the top 24, but only two teams from each country can participate in the Olympic Games. Also, China had three teams and Germany had four teams in the top 24 ranking before the Games.

=== Qualifiers ===
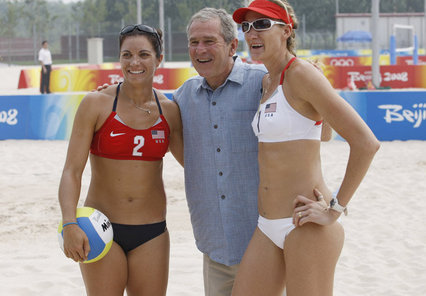
United States and Brazil have won most of the Olympic medals of beach volleyball. Picture shows then U.S. President George W. Bush with Misty May-Treanor (left) and Kerri Walsh Jennings of the U.S. Women's Beach Volleyball team at the 2008 Beijing Olympics.

The official cut off date for Olympic qualification for beach volleyball was July 20, 2008. The final Olympic Qualification Ranking for the 24 teams, was announced confirmed by the FIVB on July 24, 2008.

| No. | Rank | Team | NOC |
FIVB Beach Volleyball Olympic Ranking
| 1 | 1 | Walsh Jennings – May-Treanor | United States |
| 2 | 2 | Tian Jia – Wang | China |
| 3 | 3 | Larissa – Ana Paula^{1} | Brazil |
| 4 | 4 | Xue – Zhang Xi | China |
| 5 | 5 | Branagh – Youngs | United States |
| 6 | 6 | Talita – Renata | Brazil |
| 9 | 7 | Karantasiou – Arvaniti | Greece |
| 11 | 8 | Goller – Ludwig | Germany |
| 12 | 9 | Pohl – Rau | Germany |
| 13 | 10 | Cook – Barnett | Australia |
| 16 | 11 | Håkedal – Tørlen | Norway |
| 20 | 12 | Maaseide – Glesnes | Norway |
| 21 | 13 | Fernández–Larrea Peraza | Cuba |
| 23 | 14 | Schwaiger – Schwaiger | Austria |
| 25 | 15 | Van Breedam – Mouha | Belgium |
| 26 | 16 | Esteves Ribalta – M. Crespo | Cuba |
| 27 | 17 | Koutroumanidou – Tsiartsiani | Greece |
| 28 | 18 | Uryadova – Shiryaeva | Russia |
| 29 | 19 | Kadijk R. – Mooren | Netherlands |
| 30 | 20 | Kuhn – Schwer^{2} | Switzerland |
| 31 | 21 | Candelas – García | Mexico |
| 32 | 22 | Teru Saiki – Kusuhara | Japan |
| 33 | 23 | Saka – Rtvelo | Georgia |
| 81 | 24 | Augoustides – Nel | South Africa |

^{1} Juliana Felisberta is replaced by Ana Paula Connelly on the Brazilian team, because of an injury to Juliana.

^{2} Austrian team Montagnolli – Swoboda is replaced by the Swiss team Kuhn – Schwer, because of medical reasons.

== Participating nations ==
- Australia (1)
- Austria (1)
- Belgium (1)
- Brazil (2)
- China (2)
- Cuba (2)
- Georgia (1)
- Germany (2)
- Greece (2)
- Japan (1)
- Mexico (1)
- Netherlands (1)
- Norway (2)
- South Africa (1)
- Russia (1)
- Switzerland (1)
- United States (2)

== Preliminary round ==
| Directly advance to Round of 16 |
| Third-place/Lucky-Loser playoffs |
| Eliminated |

The two best teams from each group will advance to the quarterfinal round.

The composition of the preliminary rounds was announced confirmed on April 16, 2008.

The #1 seeded team is placed in pool A, #2 in pool B, #3 in C, #4 in D, #5 in E, and #6 in F. But if the host nation has a team in the top 6 teams, it is automatically seeded as #1. Therefore, China's team Tian Jia – Wang (ranked as #2,) is placed in pool A.

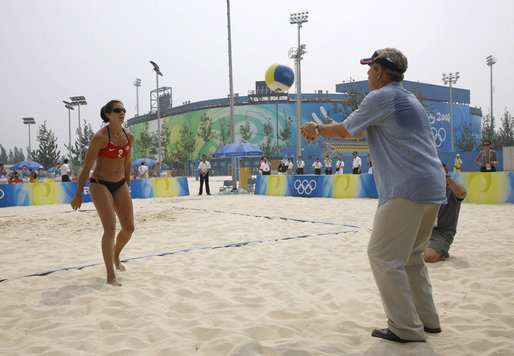
President George W. Bush sends a ball back to United States team member Misty May-Treanor (pool B), during his visit to the Chaoyang Park practice courts on August 9, 2008, before the U.S. team began their matches.

There was held a draw of lots between seed #7 – #9, between #10 – #12, between #13 – #18, and between #19 – #24. The Drawing of lots was hosted by the 1 to 1 Energy Grand Slam, in Gstaad on July 26, as part of the 2008 SWATCH FIVB Beach Volleyball World Tour.

After the preliminary rounds, from August 9–14, 2008, the teams placed 1st and 2nd in each pool have qualified for the playoffs. The two best 3rd placed teams have also qualified. Two lucky loser matches qualifies two more of the 3rd placed teams. The two 3rd placed teams that lose their lucky losers match, are out of the competition. Also out of the competition are teams placed 4th in their pool.

All times are China Standard Time (UTC+8)

=== Pool A ===
| Rk | Team | Points | Won | Lost | PW | PL | SW | SL |
|---|---|---|---|---|---|---|---|---|
| 1 | Tian Jia – Wang (CHN) | 6 | 3 | 0 | 149 | 126 | 6 | 2 |
| 2 | Maaseide – Glesnes (NOR) | 5 | 2 | 1 | 130 | 121 | 5 | 2 |
| 3 | Van Breedam – Mouha (BEL) | 4 | 1 | 2 | 135 | 134 | 3 | 4 |
| 4 | Kuhn – Schwer (SUI) | 3 | 0 | 3 | 93 | 126 | 0 | 6 |

| Aug 9, 2008; 09:00 | Maaseide – Glesnes (NOR) | 2–0 | Van Breedam – Mouha (BEL) | Beach Volleyball Ground |
| Aug 9, 2008; 09:00 | (24–22, 21–18) | | | Beach Volleyball Ground |

| Aug 9, 2008; 11:00 | Tian Jia – Wang (CHN) | 2–0 | Kuhn – Schwer (SUI) | Beach Volleyball Ground |
| Aug 9, 2008; 11:00 | (21–12, 21–18) | | | Beach Volleyball Ground |

| Aug 11, 2008; 11:00 | Tian Jia – Wang (CHN) | 2–1 | Van Breedam – Mouha (BEL) | Beach Volleyball Ground |
| Aug 11, 2008; 11:00 | (18–21, 21–19, 15–13) | | | Beach Volleyball Ground |

| Aug 11, 2008; 14:00 | Maaseide – Glesnes (NOR) | 2–0 | Kuhn – Schwer (SUI) | Beach Volleyball Ground |
| Aug 11, 2008; 14:00 | (21–11, 21–17) | | | Beach Volleyball Ground |

| Aug 13, 2008; 11:00 | Tian Jia – Wang (CHN) | 2–1 | Maaseide – Glesnes (NOR) | Beach Volleyball Ground |
| Aug 13, 2008; 11:00 | (17–21, 21–14, 15–8) | | | Beach Volleyball Ground |

| Aug 13, 2008; 13:00 | Van Breedam – Mouha (BEL) | 2–0 | Kuhn – Schwer (SUI) | Beach Volleyball Ground |
| Aug 13, 2008; 13:00 | (21–18, 21–17) | | | Beach Volleyball Ground |

=== Pool B ===
| Rk | Team | Points | Won | Lost | PW | PL | SW | SL |
|---|---|---|---|---|---|---|---|---|
| 1 | Walsh Jennings – May-Treanor (USA) | 6 | 3 | 0 | 126 | 85 | 6 | 0 |
| 2 | F. Grasset – L. Peraza (CUB) | 5 | 2 | 1 | 116 | 116 | 4 | 2 |
| 3 | Håkedal – Tørlen (NOR) | 4 | 1 | 2 | 108 | 111 | 2 | 4 |
| 4 | Teru Saiki – Kusuhara (JPN) | 3 | 0 | 3 | 88 | 126 | 0 | 6 |

| Aug 10, 2008; 09:00 | Walsh Jennings – May-Treanor (USA) | 2–0 | Teru Saiki – Kusuhara (JPN) | Beach Volleyball Ground |
| Aug 10, 2008; 09:00 | (21–12, 21–15) | | | Beach Volleyball Ground |

| Aug 10, 2008; 14:00 | Håkedal – Tørlen (NOR) | 0–2 | F. Grasset – L. Peraza (CUB) | Beach Volleyball Ground |
| Aug 10, 2008; 14:00 | (20–22, 19–21) | | | Beach Volleyball Ground |

| Aug 12, 2008; 09:00 | Walsh Jennings – May-Treanor (USA) | 2–0 | F. Grasset – L. Peraza (CUB) | Beach Volleyball Ground |
| Aug 12, 2008; 09:00 | (21–15, 21–16) | | | Beach Volleyball Ground |

| Aug 12, 2008; 12:00 | Håkedal – Tørlen (NOR) | 2–0 | Teru Saiki – Kusuhara (JPN) | Beach Volleyball Ground |
| Aug 12, 2008; 12:00 | (21–8, 21–18) | | | Beach Volleyball Ground |

| Aug 14, 2008; 09:00 | Walsh Jennings – May-Treanor (USA) | 2–0 | Håkedal – Tørlen (NOR) | Beach Volleyball Ground |
| Aug 14, 2008; 09:00 | (21–12, 21–15) | | | Beach Volleyball Ground |

| Aug 14, 2008; 11:00 | F. Grasset – L. Peraza (CUB) | 2–0 | Teru Saiki – Kusuhara (JPN) | Beach Volleyball Ground |
| Aug 14, 2008; 11:00 | (21–18, 21–17) | | | Beach Volleyball Ground |

=== Pool C ===
| Rk | Team | Points | Won | Lost | PW | PL | SW | SL |
|---|---|---|---|---|---|---|---|---|
| 1 | Barnett – Cook (AUS) | 6 | 3 | 0 | 143 | 113 | 6 | 1 |
| 2 | Larissa – Ana Paula (BRA) | 5 | 2 | 1 | 156 | 139 | 4 | 4 |
| 3 | Saka – Rtvelo (GEO) | 4 | 1 | 2 | 124 | 154 | 3 | 5 |
| 4 | Uryadova – Shiryaeva (RUS) | 3 | 0 | 3 | 140 | 157 | 3 | 6 |

| Aug 9, 2008; 12:00 | Barnett – Cook (AUS) | 2–1 | Uryadova – Shiryaeva (RUS) | Beach Volleyball Ground |
| Aug 9, 2008; 12:00 | (21–8, 19–21, 15–12) | | | Beach Volleyball Ground |

| Aug 9, 2008; 20:00 | Larissa – Ana Paula (BRA) | 2–1 | Saka – Rtvelo (GEO) | Beach Volleyball Ground |
| Aug 9, 2008; 20:00 | (23–25, 21–17, 15–5) | | | Beach Volleyball Ground |

| Aug 11, 2008; 19:00 | Barnett – Cook (AUS) | 2–0 | Saka – Rtvelo (GEO) | Beach Volleyball Ground |
| Aug 11, 2008; 19:00 | (21–18, 21–12) | | | Beach Volleyball Ground |

| Aug 11, 2008; 20:00 | Larissa – Ana Paula (BRA) | 2–1 | Uryadova – Shiryaeva (RUS) | Beach Volleyball Ground |
| Aug 11, 2008; 20:00 | (19–21, 21–12, 15–13) | | | Beach Volleyball Ground |

| Aug 13, 2008; 10:00 | Uryadova – Shiryaeva (RUS) | 1–2 | Saka – Rtvelo (GEO) | Beach Volleyball Ground |
| Aug 13, 2008; 10:00 | (21–10, 20–22, 12–15) | | | Beach Volleyball Ground |

| Aug 13, 2008; 12:00 | Larissa – Ana Paula (BRA) | 0–2 | Barnett – Cook (AUS) | Beach Volleyball Ground |
| Aug 13, 2008; 12:00 | (21–23, 21–23) | | | Beach Volleyball Ground |

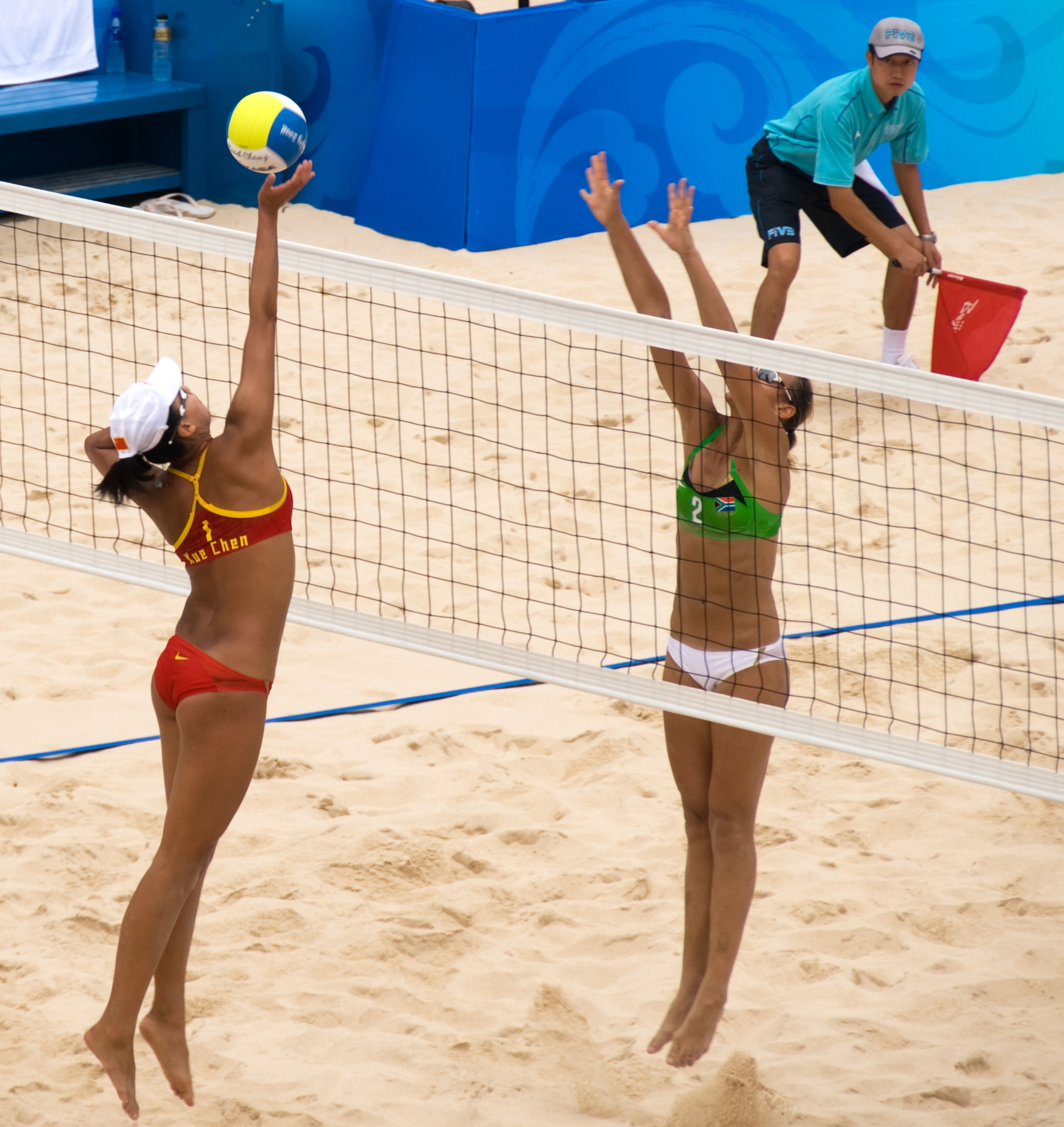
Pool D game: China v. South Africa

=== Pool D ===
| Rk | Team | Points | Won | Lost | PW | PL | SW | SL |
|---|---|---|---|---|---|---|---|---|
| 1 | Xue – Zhang Xi (CHN) | 6 | 3 | 0 | 139 | 105 | 6 | 1 |
| 2 | Goller – Ludwig (GER) | 5 | 2 | 1 | 119 | 102 | 4 | 2 |
| 3 | Koutroumanidou – Tsiartsiani (GRE) | 4 | 1 | 2 | 127 | 120 | 3 | 4 |
| 4 | Augoustides – Nel (RSA) | 3 | 0 | 3 | 68 | 126 | 0 | 6 |

| Aug 10, 2008; 18:00 | Goller – Ludwig (GER) | 2–0 | Augoustides – Nel (RSA) | Beach Volleyball Ground |
| Aug 10, 2008; 18:00 | (21–12, 21–14) | | | Beach Volleyball Ground |

| Aug 10, 2008; 19:00 | Xue – Zhang Xi (CHN) | 2–1 | Koutroumanidou – Tsiartsiani (GRE) | Beach Volleyball Ground |
| Aug 10, 2008; 19:00 | (21–18, 19–21, 15–12) | | | Beach Volleyball Ground |

| Aug 12, 2008; 11:00 | Koutroumanidou – Tsiartsiani (GRE) | 2–0 | Augoustides – Nel (RSA) | Beach Volleyball Ground |
| Aug 12, 2008; 11:00 | (21–12, 21–8) | | | Beach Volleyball Ground |

| Aug 12, 2008; 19:00 | Xue – Zhang Xi (CHN) | 2–0 | Goller – Ludwig (GER) | Beach Volleyball Ground |
| Aug 12, 2008; 19:00 | (21–14, 21–18) | | | Beach Volleyball Ground |

| Aug 14, 2008; 10:00 | Xue – Zhang Xi (CHN) | 2–0 | Augoustides – Nel (RSA) | Beach Volleyball Ground |
| Aug 14, 2008; 10:00 | (21–13, 21–9) | | | Beach Volleyball Ground |

| Aug 14, 2008; 14:00 | Goller – Ludwig (GER) | 2–0 | Koutroumanidou – Tsiartsiani (GRE) | Beach Volleyball Ground |
| Aug 14, 2008; 14:00 | (24–22, 21–12) | | | Beach Volleyball Ground |

=== Pool E ===
| Rk | Team | Points | Won | Lost | PW | PL | SW | SL |
|---|---|---|---|---|---|---|---|---|
| 1 | Branagh – Youngs (USA) | 6 | 3 | 0 | 139 | 129 | 6 | 1 |
| 2 | Pohl – Rau (GER) | 5 | 2 | 1 | 117 | 115 | 4 | 2 |
| 3 | Esteves Ribalta – M. Crespo (CUB) | 4 | 1 | 2 | 130 | 117 | 3 | 4 |
| 4 | Kadijk – Mooren (NED) | 3 | 0 | 3 | 107 | 132 | 0 | 6 |

| Aug 9, 2008; 18:00 | Branagh – Youngs (USA) | 2–0 | Kadijk – Mooren (NED) | Beach Volleyball Ground |
| Aug 9, 2008; 18:00 | (21–19, 27–25) | | | Beach Volleyball Ground |

| Aug 9, 2008; 19:00 | Pohl – Rau (GER) | 2–0 | Esteves Ribalta – M. Crespo (CUB) | Beach Volleyball Ground |
| Aug 9, 2008; 19:00 | (21–17, 21–19) | | | Beach Volleyball Ground |

| Aug 11, 2008; 12:00 | Esteves Ribalta – M. Crespo (CUB) | 2–0 | Kadijk – Mooren (NED) | Beach Volleyball Ground |
| Aug 11, 2008; 12:00 | (21–11, 21–15) | | | Beach Volleyball Ground |

| Aug 11, 2008; 18:00 | Branagh – Youngs (USA) | 2–0 | Pohl – Rau (GER) | Beach Volleyball Ground |
| Aug 11, 2008; 18:00 | (21–17, 21–16) | | | Beach Volleyball Ground |

| Aug 13, 2008; 22:00 | Branagh – Youngs (USA) | 2–1 | Esteves Ribalta – M. Crespo (CUB) | Beach Volleyball Ground |
| Aug 13, 2008; 22:00 | (21–19, 13–21, 15–12) | | | Beach Volleyball Ground |

| Aug 13, 2008; 23:00 | Pohl – Rau (GER) | 2–0 | Kadijk – Mooren (NED) | Beach Volleyball Ground |
| Aug 13, 2008; 23:00 | (21–19, 21–18) | | | Beach Volleyball Ground |

=== Pool F ===
| Rk | Team | Points | Won | Lost | PW | PL | SW | SL |
|---|---|---|---|---|---|---|---|---|
| 1 | Talita – Renata (BRA) | 6 | 3 | 0 | 139 | 121 | 6 | 1 |
| 2 | Schwaiger – Schwaiger (AUT) | 5 | 2 | 1 | 121 | 105 | 4 | 2 |
| 3 | Candelas – Garcia (MEX) | 4 | 1 | 2 | 124 | 146 | 3 | 5 |
| 4 | Karantasiou – Arvaniti (GRE) | 3 | 0 | 3 | 125 | 137 | 1 | 6 |

| Aug 10, 2008; 11:00 | Karantasiou – Arvaniti (GRE) | 0–2 | Schwaiger – Schwaiger (AUT) | Beach Volleyball Ground |
| Aug 10, 2008; 11:00 | (18–21, 18–21) | | | Beach Volleyball Ground |

| Aug 10, 2008; 12:00 | Talita – Renata (BRA) | 2–1 | Candelas – García (MEX) | Beach Volleyball Ground |
| Aug 10, 2008; 12:00 | (18–21, 21–16, 15–8) | | | Beach Volleyball Ground |

| Aug 12, 2008; 14:00 | Karantasiou – Arvaniti (GRE) | 1–2 | Candelas – García (MEX) | Beach Volleyball Ground |
| Aug 12, 2008; 14:00 | (17–21, 21–16, 12–15) | | | Beach Volleyball Ground |

| Aug 12, 2008; 20:00 | Talita – Renata (BRA) | 2–0 | Schwaiger – Schwaiger (AUT) | Beach Volleyball Ground |
| Aug 12, 2008; 20:00 | (21–18, 21–19) | | | Beach Volleyball Ground |

| Aug 14, 2008; 12:00 | Talita – Renata (BRA) | 2–0 | Karantasiou – Arvaniti (GRE) | Beach Volleyball Ground |
| Aug 14, 2008; 12:00 | (22–20, 21–19) | | | Beach Volleyball Ground |

| Aug 14, 2008; 13:00 | Schwaiger – Schwaiger (AUT) | 2–0 | Candelas – García (MEX) | Beach Volleyball Ground |
| Aug 14, 2008; 13:00 | (21–17, 21–10) | | | Beach Volleyball Ground |

=== Lucky loser ===
| Directly advance to Round of 16 |
| Third-place/Lucky-Loser playoffs |
| Eliminated |

Of the 6 teams that are placed third in their pools, two are directly qualified to the playoffs. Of the four remaining third placed teams, two teams get to the playoffs through winning a lucky loser match.

3rd-placed teams
The rank, of the 3rd placed team from each pool, is here determined by the team's ratio. The ratio is calculated as the points won, divided on the points lost.

This table shows the results of the third placed teams after the pool play, and before the lucky loser matches.

| Rk | Team | Points | Won | Lost | PW | PL | Ratio | SW | SL |
|---|---|---|---|---|---|---|---|---|---|
| 1 | Esteves Ribalta – M. Crespo (CUB) | 4 | 1 | 2 | 130 | 117 | 1.111 | 3 | 4 |
| 2 | Koutroumanidou – Tsiartsiani (GRE) | 4 | 1 | 2 | 127 | 120 | 1.058 | 3 | 4 |
| 3 | Van Breedam – Mouha (BEL) | 4 | 1 | 2 | 135 | 134 | 1.007 | 3 | 4 |
| 4 | Håkedal – Tørlen (NOR) | 4 | 1 | 2 | 108 | 111 | 0.972 | 2 | 4 |
| 5 | Candelas – García (MEX) | 4 | 1 | 2 | 124 | 146 | 0.849 | 3 | 5 |
| 6 | Saka – Rtvelo (GEO) | 4 | 1 | 2 | 120 | 154 | 0.779 | 3 | 5 |

Lucky Loser
Results of the Lucky Loser matches only.

| Rk | Team | Points | Won | Lost | PW | PL | SW | SL |
|---|---|---|---|---|---|---|---|---|
| 1 | Van Breedam – Mouha (BEL) | 2 | 1 | 0 | 42 | 32 | 2 | 0 |
| 2 | Saka – Rtvelo (GEO) | 1 | 0 | 1 | 32 | 42 | 0 | 2 |

| Rk | Team | Points | Won | Lost | PW | PL | SW | SL |
|---|---|---|---|---|---|---|---|---|
| 1 | Håkedal – Tørlen (NOR) | 2 | 1 | 0 | 56 | 45 | 2 | 1 |
| 2 | Candelas – García (MEX) | 1 | 0 | 1 | 45 | 56 | 1 | 2 |

| Aug 14, 2008; 21:00 | Van Breedam – Mouha (BEL) | 2–0 | Saka – Rtvelo (GEO) | Beach Volleyball Ground |
| Aug 14, 2008; 21:00 | (21–13, 21–19) | | | Beach Volleyball Ground |

| Aug 14, 2008; 21:00 | Håkedal – Tørlen (NOR) | 2–1 | Candelas – García (MEX) | Beach Volleyball Ground |
| Aug 14, 2008; 21:00 | (20–22, 21–12, 15–11) | | | Beach Volleyball Ground |

== Playoffs ==
=== Round of 16 ===
The United States, Brazil and China managed to directly qualify two teams each, for the Round of 16, through the pool play. All six teams then won their matches in the Round of 16, and qualified for the quarterfinals. Austria and Australia also won each their Round of 16 match, and took the remaining two spots in the quarterfinals.

On August 15, one of the spectators gave birth to a baby boy, in the bathroom of the Olympic beach volleyball stadium where she was watching the women's playoff. Medical workers received the message about the woman at 10:10 a.m., and the baby was already born when they arrived 4 minutes later.

| Aug 15, 2008; 09:00 | Van Breedam – Mouha (BEL) | 0–2 | Walsh Jennings – May-Treanor (USA) | Beach Volleyball Ground |
| Aug 15, 2008; 09:00 | (22–24, 10–21) | | | Beach Volleyball Ground |

| Aug 15, 2008; 10:00 | Branagh – Youngs (USA) | 2–0 | F. Grasset – L. Peraza (CUB) | Beach Volleyball Ground |
| Aug 15, 2008; 10:00 | (21–15, 21–13) | | | Beach Volleyball Ground |

| Aug 15, 2008; 11:00 | Tian Jia – Wang (CHN) | 2–0 | Håkedal – Tørlen (NOR) | Beach Volleyball Ground |
| Aug 15, 2008; 11:00 | (21–13, 21–15) | | | Beach Volleyball Ground |

| Aug 15, 2008; 12:00 | Barnett – Cook (AUS) | 2–1 | Koutroumanidou – Tsiartsiani (GRE) | Beach Volleyball Ground |
| Aug 15, 2008; 12:00 | (22–20, 19–21, 15–12) | | | Beach Volleyball Ground |

| Aug 15, 2008; 18:00 | Goller – Ludwig (GER) | 1–2 | Schwaiger – Schwaiger (AUT) | Beach Volleyball Ground |
| Aug 15, 2008; 18:00 | (21–23, 21–11, 16–18) | | | Beach Volleyball Ground |

| Aug 15, 2008; 19:00 | Esteves Ribalta – M. Crespo (CUB) | 0–2 | Xue – Zhang Xi (CHN) | Beach Volleyball Ground |
| Aug 15, 2008; 19:00 | (19–21, 13–21) | | | Beach Volleyball Ground |

| Aug 15, 2008; 20:00 | Maaseide – Glesnes (NOR) | 1–2 | Talita – Renata (BRA) | Beach Volleyball Ground |
| Aug 15, 2008; 20:00 | (21–12, 19–21, 13–15) | | | Beach Volleyball Ground |

| Aug 15, 2008; 21:00 | Larissa – Ana Paula (BRA) | 2–0 | Pohl – Rau (GER) | Beach Volleyball Ground |
| Aug 15, 2008; 21:00 | (21–18, 21–14) | | | Beach Volleyball Ground |

=== Overview ===
If the host nation has a team in the top 6 teams on the FIVB Olympic ranking when the Olympic Games begin, it is automatically seeded as #1. Therefore, China's team Tian Jia – Wang (ranked as #2 on the Olympic ranking,) is seeded as #1.

Quarterfinals
1 | Tian Jia – Wang (CHN) | 21 | 21
14 | Schwaiger – Schwaiger (AUT) | 12 | 12
5 | Branagh – Youngs (USA) | 17 | 13
4 | Xue – Zhang Xi (CHN) | 21 | 21
10 | Barnett – Cook (AUS) | 22 | 14
6 | Talita – Renata (BRA) | 24 | 21
3 | Larissa – Ana Paula (BRA) | 18 | 15
2 | Walsh Jennings – May-Treanor (USA) | 21 | 21

Semifinals
1 | Tian Jia – Wang (CHN) | 22 | 29 | 15
4 | Xue – Zhang Xi (CHN) | 24 | 27 | 8
6 | Talita – Renata (BRA) | 12 | 14
2 | Walsh Jennings – May-Treanor (USA) | 21 | 21

Gold medal game
1 | Tian Jia – Wang (CHN) | 18 | 18
2 | Walsh Jennings – May-Treanor (USA) | 21 | 21
Bronze medal game
4 | Xue – Zhang Xi (CHN) | 21 | 21
6 | Talita – Renata (BRA) | 19 | 17

=== Quarterfinals ===
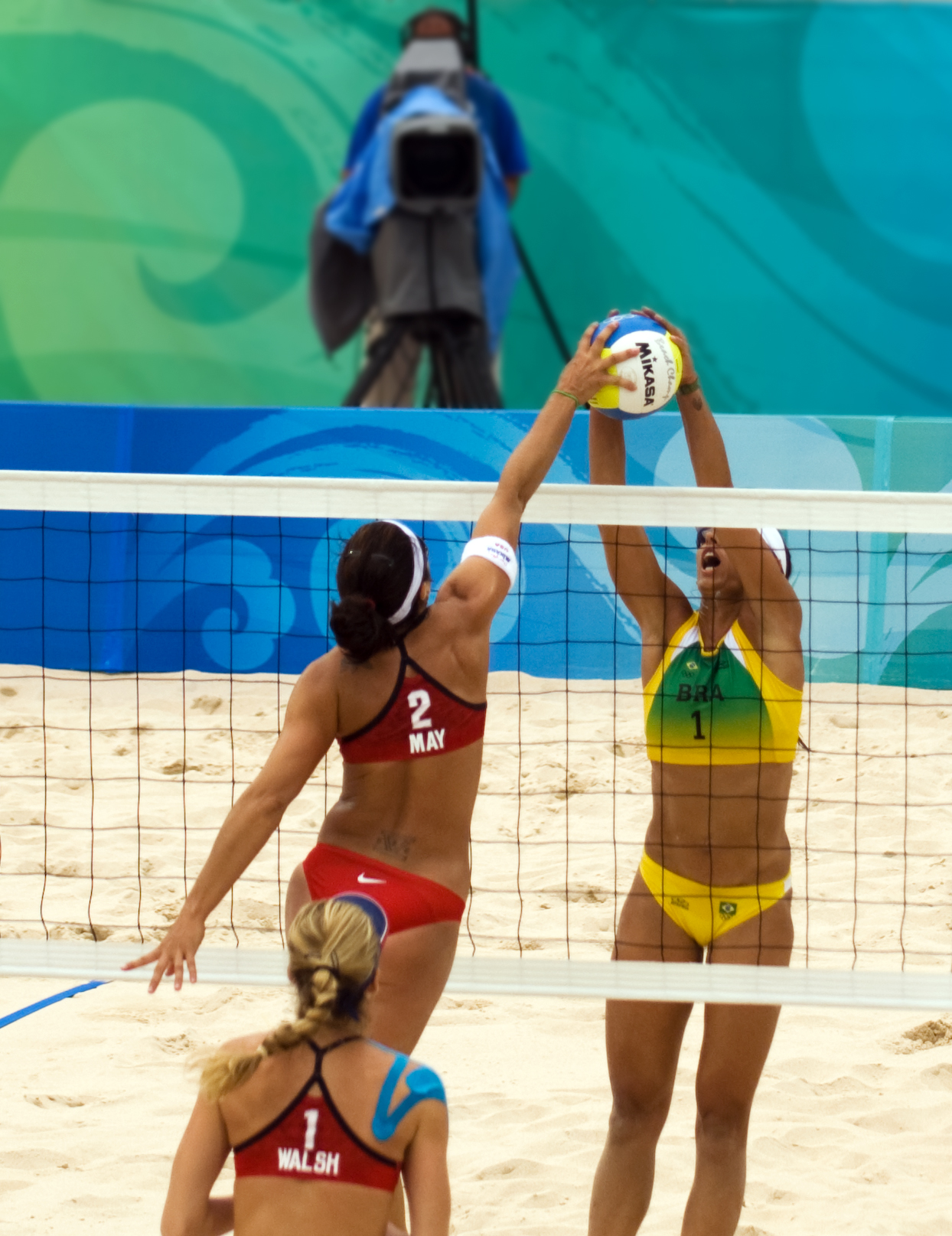
USA v. Brazil quarterfinals

| Aug 17, 2008; 10:00 | Larissa – Ana Paula (BRA) | 0–2 | Walsh Jennings – May-Treanor (USA) | Beach Volleyball Ground |
| Aug 17, 2008; 10:00 | (18–21, 15–21) | | | Beach Volleyball Ground |

| Aug 17, 2008; 11:00 | Tian Jia – Wang (CHN) | 2–0 | Schwaiger – Schwaiger (AUT) | Beach Volleyball Ground |
| Aug 17, 2008; 11:00 | (21–12, 21–12) | | | Beach Volleyball Ground |

| Aug 17, 2008; 20:00 | Branagh – Youngs (USA) | 0–2 | Xue – Zhang Xi (CHN) | Beach Volleyball Ground |
| Aug 17, 2008; 20:00 | (17–21, 13–21) | | | Beach Volleyball Ground |

| Aug 17, 2008; 21:00 | Barnett – Cook (AUS) | 0–2 | Talita – Renata (BRA) | Beach Volleyball Ground |
| Aug 17, 2008; 21:00 | (22–24, 14–21) | | | Beach Volleyball Ground |

=== Semifinals ===
| Aug 19, 2008; 09:00 | Talita – Renata (BRA) | 0–2 | Walsh Jennings – May-Treanor (USA) | Beach Volleyball Ground |
| Aug 19, 2008; 09:00 | (12–21, 14–21) | | | Beach Volleyball Ground |

| Aug 19, 2008; 10:00 | Tian Jia – Wang (CHN) | 2–1 | Xue – Zhang Xi (CHN) | Beach Volleyball Ground |
| Aug 19, 2008; 10:00 | (22–24, 29–27, 15–8) | | | Beach Volleyball Ground |

=== Bronze medal match ===
| Aug 21, 2008; 09:00 | Xue – Zhang Xi (CHN) | 2–0 | Talita – Renata (BRA) | Beach Volleyball Ground |
| Aug 21, 2008; 09:00 | (21–19, 21–17) | | | Beach Volleyball Ground |

=== Gold medal match ===
| Aug 21, 2008; 11:00 | Tian Jia – Wang (CHN) | 0–2 | Walsh Jennings – May-Treanor (USA) | Beach Volleyball Ground |
| Aug 21, 2008; 11:00 | (18–21, 18–21) | | | Beach Volleyball Ground |

=== Award ceremony ===
- 12:10, Aug 21, 2008

== Final ranking ==
If the host nation has a team in the top 6 teams on the FIVB Olympic ranking when the Olympic Games begin, it is automatically seeded as #1. Therefore, China's team Tian Jia – Wang (ranked as #2 on the FIVB Olympic ranking before the Olympic Games,) is seeded as #1.

| RANK | TEAM | SEED |
|---|---|---|
| 1st place, gold medalist(s) | Walsh Jennings – May-Treanor (USA) | 2 |
| 2nd place, silver medalist(s) | Tian Jia – Wang (CHN) | 1 |
| 3rd place, bronze medalist(s) | Xue – Zhang Xi (CHN) | 4 |
| 4. | Talita – Renata (BRA) | 6 |
| 5. | Larissa – Ana Paula (BRA) | 3 |
| 5. | Branagh – Youngs (USA) | 5 |
| 5. | Barnett – Cook (AUS) | 10 |
| 5. | Schwaiger – Schwaiger (AUT) | 14 |
| 9. | Goller – Ludwig (GER) | 8 |
| 9. | Pohl – Rau (GER) | 9 |
| 9. | Håkedal – Tørlen (NOR) | 11 |
| 9. | Maaseide – Glesnes (NOR) | 12 |
| 9. | Fernandez Grasset – Larrea Peraza (CUB) | 13 |
| 9. | Van Breedam – Mouha (BEL) | 15 |
| 9. | Esteves Ribalta – M. Crespo (CUB) | 16 |
| 9. | Koutroumanidou – Tsiartsiani (GRE) | 17 |
| 17. | Candelas – Garcia (MEX) | 21 |
| 17. | Saka – Rtvelo (GEO) | 23 |
| 19. | Karantasiou – Arvaniti (GRE) | 7 |
| 19. | Uryadova – Shiryaeva (RUS) | 18 |
| 19. | Kadijk R. – Mooren (NED) | 19 |
| 19. | Kuhn – Schwer (SUI) | 20 |
| 19. | Teru Saiki – Kusuhara (JPN) | 22 |
| 19. | Augoustides – Nel (RSA) | 24 |
