= Sanne Keizer =

Dutch beach volleyball player

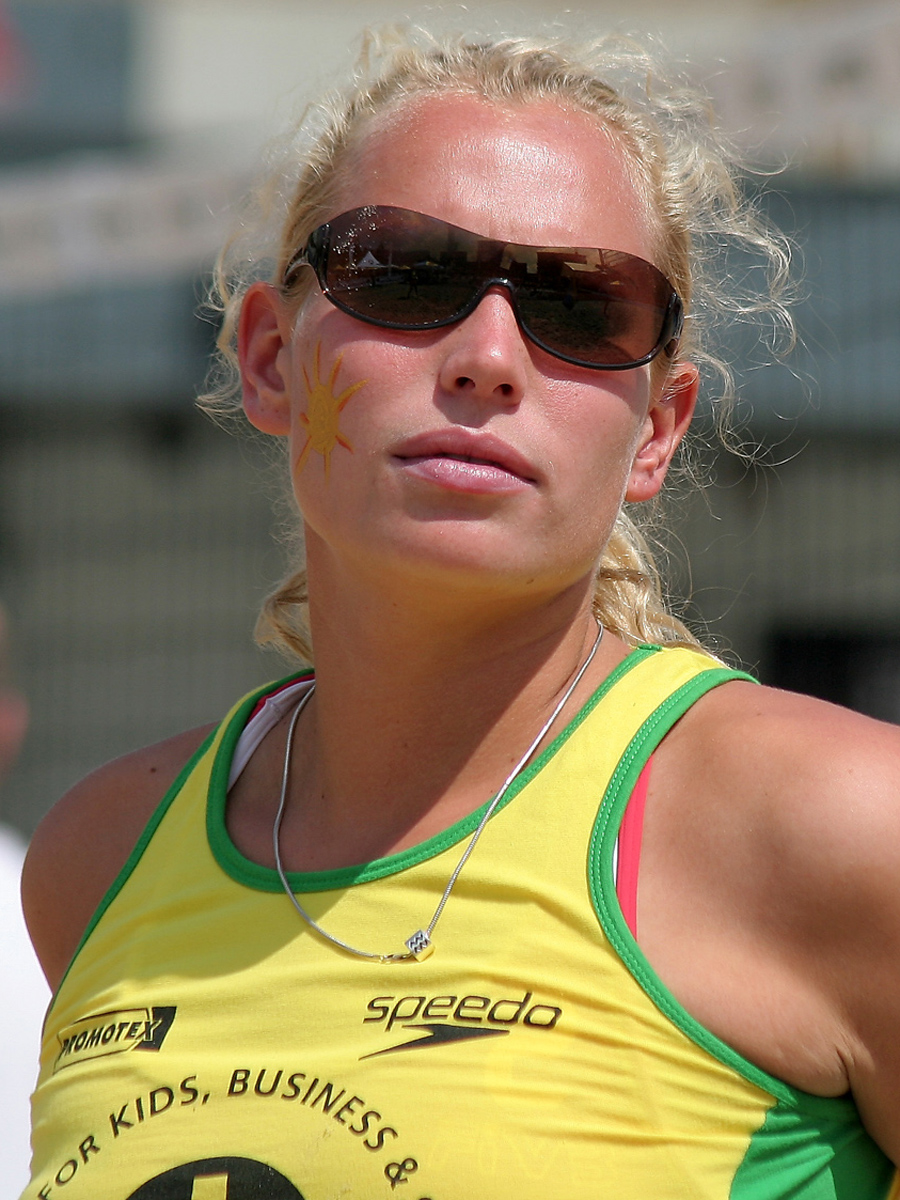
- Keizer in 2007

Personal information
- National team: Netherlands
- Born: 6 February 1985 (age 41) Doetinchem, Netherlands
- Years active: 2002–2013, 2017–present
- Height: 1.82 m (5 ft 11 1/2 in)

Sport
- Sport: Beach volleyball
- Position: Right side/defender
- Partner: Madelein Meppelink (2017–)
- Former partners: Merel Mooren (2003–04); Marrit Leenstra (2005–07); Mered de Vries (2008); Marleen van Iersel (2008–13)
International medals
Women's beach volleyball
Representing Netherlands
World Tour
Gold medal – first place	2011 Shanghai	Open
Gold medal – first place	2011 Myslowice	Open
Silver medal – second place	2012 Gstaad	Grand Slam
Silver medal – second place	2018 Mersin	3-star
Bronze medal – third place	2009 Japan	Open
Bronze medal – third place	2011 Klagenfurt	Grand Slam
Bronze medal – third place	2012 Beijing	Grand Slam
Bronze medal – third place	2018 Vienna	Major
European Championships
Gold medal – first place	2012 The Hague	Team
Gold medal – first place	2018 The Hague	Team
U18 World Championships
Gold medal – first place	2002 Xylokastro	Team
U18 European Championships
Silver medal – second place	2002 Illichivsk	Team
- Updated on 9 March 2019

Sanne Keizer (born 6 February 1985) is a Dutch beach volleyball player who plays as a right-side defender with her partner Madelein Meppelink. Her career highlights include two gold, two silver and four bronze medals on the FIVB World Tour. She is a two-time European Champion and she represented the Netherlands at the 2012 Summer Olympics, finishing ninth with Marleen van Iersel.

Keizer took up indoor volleyball at the age of 11 and spent several years playing in the Dutch volleyball leagues. She competed in her first international beach volleyball event in 2002 and became the inaugural U18 World Champion the same year. Keizer debuted on the World Tour the following year. For the next eight seasons, she had limited international success competing with three different partners. Her breakthrough came at the end of 2008 when she teamed up with van Iersel. The pair entered the top ten of the world rankings the year after and medalled on the World Tour five times in total, including their first World Tour title in 2011. They continued to play together until Keizer retired from beach volleyball at the end of 2013.

After a four-year hiatus, Keizer returned to full-time competition partnered with Meppelink. Having been a blocker in the first leg of her career, she came back as a defender instead. Keizer and Meppelink found success quickly, medalling on the World Tour twice in their first season together and winning the 2018 European Championships.

== Early life, education, and family ==
Keizer was born on 6 February 1985 in Doetinchem, Netherlands. As a child, she was a competitive swimmer before switching to water polo because her parents felt that she should play a team sport instead. She was called to the junior national water polo team, but eventually left the sport because the chlorinated swimming pool water was tinting her blond hair green and she was afraid of going to the hairdressers. At the age of 11, she took up indoor volleyball as she wanted to continue playing a ball sport. From 1996 to 2002, Keizer played for her local club, Orion Volleybal Doetinchem, where she rose from the youth ranks to the club's first team that played in the Eerste Divisie, the third division of the Dutch volleyball league system.

Keizer was scouted by the national beach volleyball team when she was 15. For the next few years, she continued to play club indoor volleyball while spending the summer off-seasons training with the junior national beach volleyball team in Dwingeloo. On the indoor side, she transferred from Orion to Longa '59 for the 2002–03 season, before moving to Amsterdam to spend one season playing for VV Martinus in the Eredivisie, the highest division of the Dutch volleyball league system. She continued to live in Amsterdam until she moved to The Hague in 2008.

In 2007, Keizer obtained an HBO diploma in Commercial Economics at the Rotterdam University of Applied Sciences. She became a member of the Police Top Sport Selection (Dutch: Politie Topsport Selectie) in May 2012. The programme ensures selected athletes receive support, including employment opportunities, from the Dutch police force. During her temporary retirement from beach volleyball, Keizer earned a master's degree in criminal investigation and worked as a police detective in The Hague. She left the police force upon her return to full-time competition at the end of 2017.

Keizer has two brothers and one sister. She is married to beach volleyball player-turned-coach Michiel van der Kuip, and the couple have two children, twins born in 2016.

== Career ==
=== 2002–2004: Junior and early years ===
Keizer made her international beach volleyball debut at the 2002 U18 European Championships in August, where she and Arjanne Stevens won the silver medal. Two weeks later, the pair became the inaugural U18 World Champions with an unbeaten tournament run in Xylokastro, Greece.

Following her success on the junior circuit, Keizer debuted on the FIVB World Tour in 2003, partnering with Merel Mooren at the $150K Hellas Open in June. The duo did not progress past the qualifying rounds in Hellas or in their next four events. In their final tournament of the year at the $150K Lianyungang Open in August, Keizer and Mooren beat teams from Spain and Sweden to advance to Keizer's first main draw on the World Tour. They lost all three of their group stage matches in the main draw and did not progress further. Keizer concluded her first season on the World Tour ranked No. 70 in the world with Mooren.

Keizer and Mooren continued to struggle to qualify for main draws on the World Tour the following year, making it out of the qualifiers twice in their first eight tournaments. They also competed in two events on the Challenger and Satellite circuit in August, winning one gold medal. Towards the end of the season, the pair had accumulated sufficient ranking points to directly enter the World Tour main draws of the $180K Milan and Rio de Janeiro Opens, finishing 25th and 17th respectively. They ended the year with an improved world ranking of No. 39.

=== 2005–2007: Partnering with Leenstra ===
After two seasons with Mooren, Keizer switched partners and played with Marrit Leenstra from 2005 to 2007. In the first year of their partnership, the duo did not place higher than 13th in the first ten World Tour events they entered. Seeded 11th at their next tournament, the $200K Montreal Open in August, they upset two top-ten seeds on their way to the semifinals where they lost to Brazil's third-seeded Talita Antunes and Renata Ribeiro, followed by another loss to Brazil's second-seeded Shelda Bede and Adriana Behar in the bronze-medal match. After Montreal, Keizer and Leenstra had top-ten finishes in four of their last five tournaments of 2005. They also competed in their first World Championships in June as the No. 22 seeds, posting three wins and two losses to tie for 17th place. They closed out their first season as teammates ranked 13th in the world.

Over the next two years, Keizer and Leenstra had limited success on the international circuit and were relegated to the qualifiers for the majority of 2007. Their best results were top-ten finishes at the double-elimination $200K St. Petersburg and Porto Santo Opens in 2006. As the No. 20 seeds in St. Petersburg, they recorded a three-set upset over the third-seeded Tian Jia and Wang Jie of China, before falling to the eighth-seeded Nila Håkedal and Ingrid Tørlen of Norway in the fourth round of the losers bracket. In Porto Santo, the pair finished in seventh place as the No. 16 seeds, scoring upsets over the higher-seeded Cuban teams of Milagros Crespo and Imara Esteves Ribalta, and Dalixia Fernández and Tamara Larrea. They were knocked out of the competition by the eighth seeds from Germany, Rieke Brink-Abeler and Hella Jurich. By the end of 2007, their world ranking had dropped to No. 44.

Throughout the course of their partnership, Keizer and Leenstra were also active on the Nestea European Championship Tour, winning bronze medals at the €55K German and Swiss Masters in 2006. After failing to qualify two years prior, Keizer took part in the 2006 edition of the European Championships with Leenstra; they fell short of their No. 6 seed and finished ninth.

=== 2008: Partnering with de Vries ===
After three seasons together, Keizer split from Leenstra and teamed up with Mered de Vries for 2008. The new pairing did not win any main draw matches in their first ten World Tour events. Their results picked up in July when they competed at the $300K Gstaad Grand Slam as the No. 26 seeds. Keizer and de Vries came through the qualifiers and upset two of the top-ten seeds on their way to the Round of 16, where they were defeated by Maria Elisa Antonelli and Vanilda Leão of Brazil. Later in the month, they achieved their highest finish as a team with a fifth place at the $300K Klagenfurt Grand Slam. Seeded 26th once more, they came back from a first-set loss to beat the fourth-seeded Talita and Renata of Brazil in the Round of 16, before losing to Ukraine's 27th-seeded Svitlana Baburina and Galyna Osheyko in the quarterfinals. They ended the year 31st in the world rankings.

=== 2008–2010: Partnering with van Iersel ===
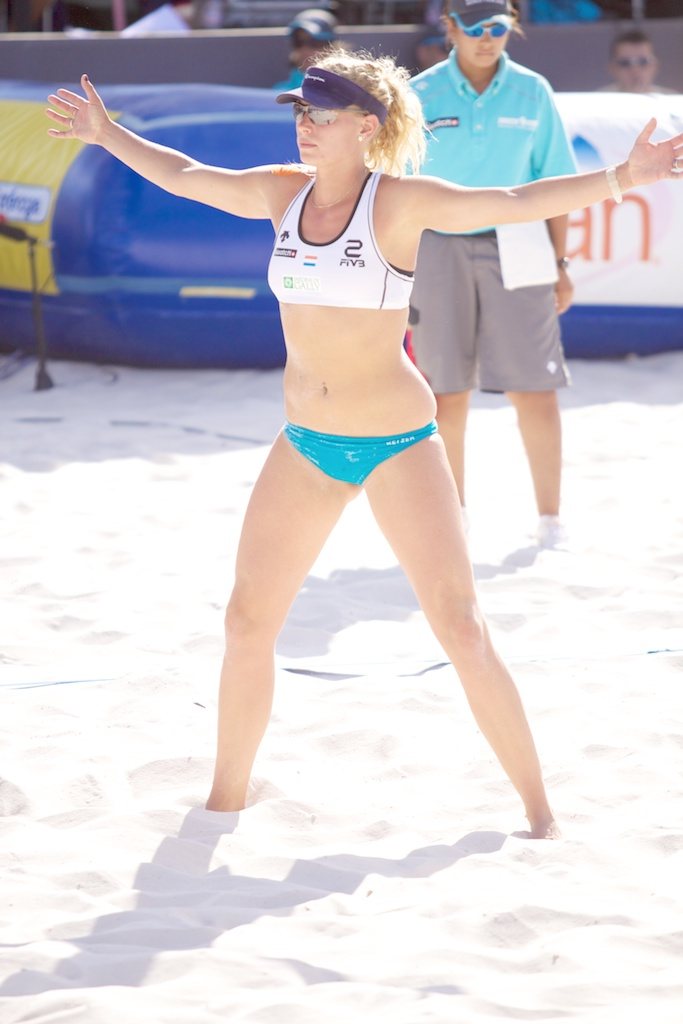
Keizer preparing to receive a serve at the 2010 Marseille Open

Towards the end of 2008, Keizer changed partners once again and paired up with Marleen van Iersel. She began to see better results on the international circuit, including her first World Tour podium at the $190K Japan Open in the spring of 2009. After losing their first match, the 13th-seeded Keizer and van Iersel won six consecutive matches to reach the final four, recording upsets over two top-five seeds along the way. They lost to Brazil's top-seeded Juliana Silva and Larissa França in the semifinals, then went on to beat the USA's 26th-seeded Angie Akers and Tyra Turner in the bronze-medal match. The bronze in Japan was only the second time a Dutch women's team had ever won a World Tour medal. Another bronze-medal match-up followed at the $300K Gstaad Grand Slam two months later. This time, the Dutch No. 13 seeds lost to the fourth-seeded Nicole Branagh and Elaine Youngs of the United States in two sets. Keizer and van Iersel also competed at the 2009 World and European Championships, and were stopped in the quarterfinals of both tournaments. They were the sixth-ranked team in the world at the end of the year.

Keizer and van Iersel made three more World Tour semifinals appearances the next season, but did not medal. The duo entered the 2010 European Championships as the No. 6 seeds, eventually finishing fourth with a loss to the German No. 1 seeds of Sara Goller and Laura Ludwig in the semifinals, and the Finnish No. 4 seeds of Emilia and Erika Nyström in the bronze-medal match. They were ranked No. 9 in the world at the conclusion of the season.

=== 2011: First World Tour titles ===
The 2011 season was a breakthrough year for the pair as they became the first European women's team to win back-to-back World Tour titles. They won their first World Tour title at the $190K Shanghai Open in May. Seeded No. 7, they reached the gold-medal match with upsets over three of the top-five seeds, then capped off an undefeated tournament run with a 15–21, 26–24, 15–13 victory over Jennifer Kessy and April Ross of the United States. Later that same month at the $190K Myslowice Open, Keizer and van Iersel were sent to the losers bracket in the third round of the double-elimination competition by Italy's Greta Cicolari and Marta Menegatti. The pair then won four matches in a row to make it to the finals where they faced Cicolari and Menegatti once again. This time, the Dutch duo beat the Italians in two sets for their second World Tour title. After their success in Shanghai and Myslowice, they were temporarily set back by a back injury sustained by van Iersel that forced them to withdraw from their next tournament. By August however, they had attained another podium finish at the $300K Klagenfurt Grand Slam as the No. 8 seeds, losing only to the fourth-seeded Misty May-Treanor and Kerri Walsh Jennings of the United States in the semifinals, before beating the third-seeded Brazilian duo of Maria Elisa and Talita to win the bronze medal.

After their World Tour victories the month prior, the pair came into the 2011 World Championships as the tournament's dark horse, but found themselves eliminated by Germany's Jana Köhler and Julia Sude in the Round of 16. Keizer and van Iersel also entered 2011 European Championships in August as the No. 1 seeds. They progressed to the quarterfinals where they were upset by the 16th-seeded Barbara Hansel and Sara Montagnolli of Austria, a team that they had beaten earlier in the group stage. The duo wrapped up the year ranked No. 7 in the world.

=== 2012: European Champions, London Olympics ===
In the lead up to the 2012 Summer Olympics in London, Keizer and van Iersel competed at seven World Tour events. They medalled in two of them, winning bronze at the $300K Beijing Grand Slam, followed by silver at the $300K Gstaad Grand Slam. They notched victories against top-ranked teams including the Chinese team of Xue Chen and Zhang Xi, and the American team of Kessy and Ross.

The pair also competed at the European Championships in The Hague at the end of May. Coming in as the No. 3 seeds, Keizer and van Iersel advanced to the finals undefeated. In their quarterfinal match against Belgium's seventh-seeded Katrien Gielen and Liesbeth Mouha, the home side rallied from a set down to win 18–21, 21–15, 15–10. In the semifinals, they beat the Czech Republic's top-seeded Lenka Háječková and Hana Skalníková, and were subsequently crowned the new European Champions with a victory over Vassiliki Arvaniti and Maria Tsiartsiani of Greece in the championship match.

Keizer and van Iersel qualified for the London Olympics on 18 June 2012 via their Olympic ranking points. They entered the tournament ranked fourth in the world and were dubbed a "sleeper team" by player-turned-commentator Kevin Wong. Seeded ninth, they lost their first two group stage matches against the 16th-seeded Elsa Baquerizo and Liliana Fernández of Spain, and the fourth-seeded Kessy and Ross of the United States. A must-win victory over Argentina's No. 21 seeds Ana Gallay and María Zonta ensured they advanced to the Round of 16 where they faced the USA's third-seeded May-Treanor and Walsh Jennings. The Americans defeated them in straight sets, thus ending Keizer and van Iersel's Olympic run. The Olympics was their last tournament of 2012 and they ended the year eighth in the world rankings.

=== 2013–2017: Hiatus ===
Keizer and van Iersel did not medal on the World Tour in 2013; their highest finish was a fifth at the $220K The Hague Grand Slam. They also took part in the European Championships, advancing to the Round of 16 where they lost the deciding set against their compatriots Jantine van der Vlist and Marloes Wesselink. After 11 years competing on the World Tour, Keizer decided to retire at the end of 2013 to focus more on her personal life and police work.

Despite her retirement, Keizer continued to enter beach volleyball tournaments every now and then. She partnered with Sophie van Gestel to compete at the $500K Transavia Grand Slam mid-2014; they lost all three of their group stage matches and did not progress further. In the summer of 2017, she played at the $150K Dela Beach Open with Madelein Meppelink as a replacement for Meppelink's injured partner van Gestel. The pair advanced to the Round of 16 before they were eliminated by Brazil's Maria Elisa and Carolina "Carol" Solberg Salgado; the Brazilian duo went on to win the tournament. Playing at the 2017 Dela Beach Open prompted Keizer to consider returning to the sport on a full-time basis. Her subsequent participation in two national tour events—one with Meppelink and one with van Iersel—further convinced her to make a comeback.

=== 2018–present: Partnering with Meppelink, European Champions ===
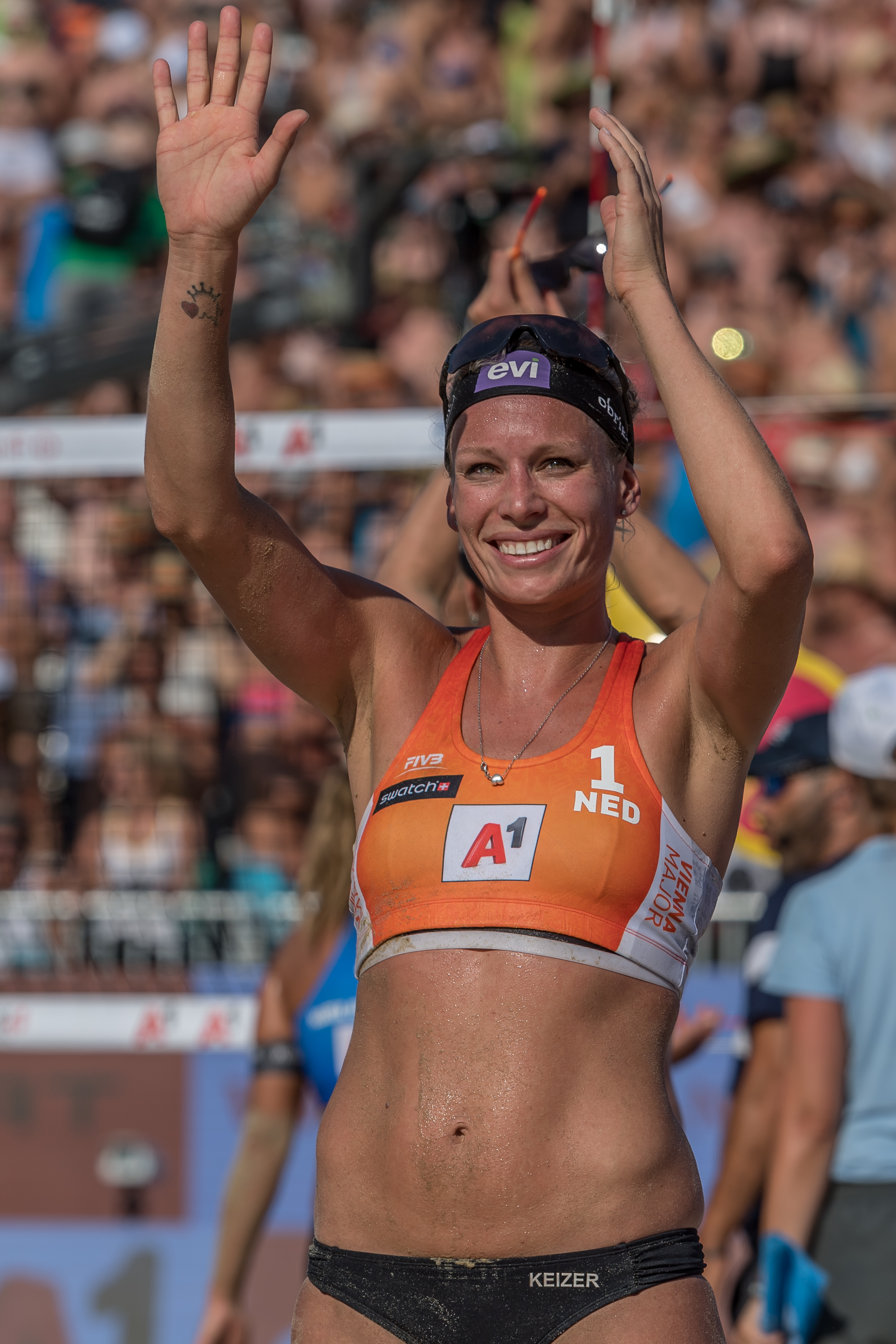
Keizer at the 2018 Vienna Major

I felt I still loved beach volleyball so much and could still play the game, it was like coming home. It was not an easy decision, everything around me changed so much and it's really hard to leave home and travel around the world again with kids. But my husband was very supportive and I felt my dream was still the same. I want to do better than in the first time and return to the Olympics.

— Sanne Keizer

At the end of 2017, Keizer committed to a full-time comeback to beach volleyball with Meppelink. Despite a slow start, Keizer and Meppelink soon found success by medalling on the World Tour twice in 2018. The first was a silver medal at the $75K Mersin Open in May. Three months later, they entered the $300K Vienna Major as the No. 16 seeds. They advanced to the final four undefeated, including a victory over Canada's top-seeded Melissa Humana-Paredes and Sarah Pavan. In the semifinals, they lost to the fourth-seeded Fernanda Alves and Bárbara Seixas of Brazil, but came back the next day to beat Maria Elisa and Carol to claim the bronze medal. Despite starting off the season with zero ranking points, Keizer qualified for the 2018 World Tour Finals which features the top ten teams in the world rankings. The pair did not win any of their group stage matches and tied for last place.

Keizer and Meppelink also took part in the 2018 European Championships in July. Seeded 15th, they posted a loss to France's 31st-seeded Aline Chamereau and Alexandra Jupiter, but made it to the finals with victories over the second-seeded Czech team of Barbora Hermannová and Markéta Sluková, and the third-seeded Swiss team of Zoe and Anouk Vergé-Dépré. In the gold-medal match, Keizer and Meppelink defeated the fifth-seeded Nina Betschart and Tanja Huberli of Switzerland in straight sets for the second European Championship title of Keizer's career.

== Style of play ==
Keizer is a defender and a right-handed right-side player. She had been a blocker before her retirement in 2013, but at slightly above 1.8 metres (5 ft 11 in), she had long felt unsuited and undersized for the role. As such, a condition for her return at the end of 2017 was that she got to switch roles and play as a defender instead. Olympic gold medalist Dain Blanton noted at the 2018 Vienna Major that Keizer has an aggressive and physical playing style to go along with being a well-rounded player. Her setting ability in particular has been praised by opponents.

Of the 87 players who competed in a Major Series main draw on the 2018 World Tour, Keizer was ranked 34th for total points scored, averaging 6.21 points per set; 32nd for total kills, averaging 5.71 kills per set; and 35th for number of aces, with around 5.5% of her serves being aces.

== Career statistics ==
=== World Tour finals: 4 (2–2) ===
Legend
$400,000 tournaments (0–0)
$300,000 tournaments (0–1)
$190,000 tournaments (2–0)
$75,000 tournaments (0–1)
$50,000 tournaments (0–0)

Result	W–L	Date	Tournament	Tier	Partner	Opponents	Score
Win	1–0	May 2011	Shanghai Open	$190K	Marleen van Iersel	(United States) Jennifer Kessy (United States) April Ross	15–21, 26–24, 15–13 (1:02)
Win	2–0	May 2011	Myslowice Open	$190K	Marleen van Iersel	(Italy) Greta Cicolari (Italy) Marta Menegatti	21–17, 21–18 (0:39)
Loss	2–1	Jul 2012	Gstaad Grand Slam	$300K	Marleen van Iersel	(United States) Misty May-Treanor (United States) Kerri Walsh Jennings	10–21, 13–21 (0:32)
Loss	2–2	May 2018	Mersin, Turkey	$75K	Madelein Meppelink	(Austria) Lena Plesiutschnig (Austria) Katharina Schützenhöfer	21–18, 23–25, 12–15 (0:58)

=== European finals: 2 (2–0) ===
Result	W–L	Date	Tournament	Partner	Opponents	Score
Win	1–0	Jun 2012	European Championships	Marleen van Iersel	(Greece) Vassiliki Arvaniti (Greece) Maria Tsiartsiani	21–17, 21–11 (0:36)
Win	2–0	Jul 2018	European Championships	Madelein Meppelink	(Switzerland) Nina Betschart (Switzerland) Tanja Hüberli	21–16, 26–24 (0:44)

=== Performance timeline ===
Key

W	F	SF	QF	#R	RR	Q#	A	G	S	B	NH	N/A	DNQ

(W) won; (F) finalist; (SF) semi-finalist; (QF) quarter-finalist; (#R) rounds 4, 3, 2, 1; (RR) round-robin stage; (Q#) qualification round; (A) absent; (G) gold, (S) silver or (B) bronze medal; (NH) not held; (N/A) not applicable; (DNQ) did not qualify.
To avoid confusion and double counting, these charts are updated at the conclusion of a tournament or when the player's participation has ended.

Current through the 2018 FIVB World Tour Finals.

Tournament	2005	2006	2007	2008	2009	2010	2011	2012	2013	2014–2017	2018	SR	W–L	Win %
Summer Olympics	NH	NH	NH	A	NH	NH	NH	1R (1–3)	NH	A	NH	0 / 1	1–3	25%
World Championships	3R (3–2)	NH	RR (0–3)	NH	QF (4–2)	NH	2R (4–1)	NH	2R (2–3)	A	NH	0 / 5	13–11	54%
World Tour Finals	NH	NH	NH	NH	NH	NH	NH	NH	NH	A	RR (0–3)	0 / 1	0–3	0%
European Championships	3R (1–2)	A	A	A	QF (2–2)	SF (5–2)	QF (4–1)	W (7–0)	2R (3–1)	A	W (6–1)	2 / 7	28–9	76%
Career statistics
Titles / Finals	0 / 0	0 / 0	0 / 0	0 / 0	0 / 0	0 / 0	0 / 0	1 / 1	0 / 0	0 / 0	1 / 1	0 / 0		
Overall win–loss	4–4	0–0	0–3	0–0	6–4	5–2	8–2	8–3	5–4	0–0	6–4	42–26		
Year-end ranking	13	29	44	31	6	9	7	8	20	N/A	13	62%		

Note: Only main draw results are considered.
