= Vita Nel =

South African beach volleyball player (born 1975)

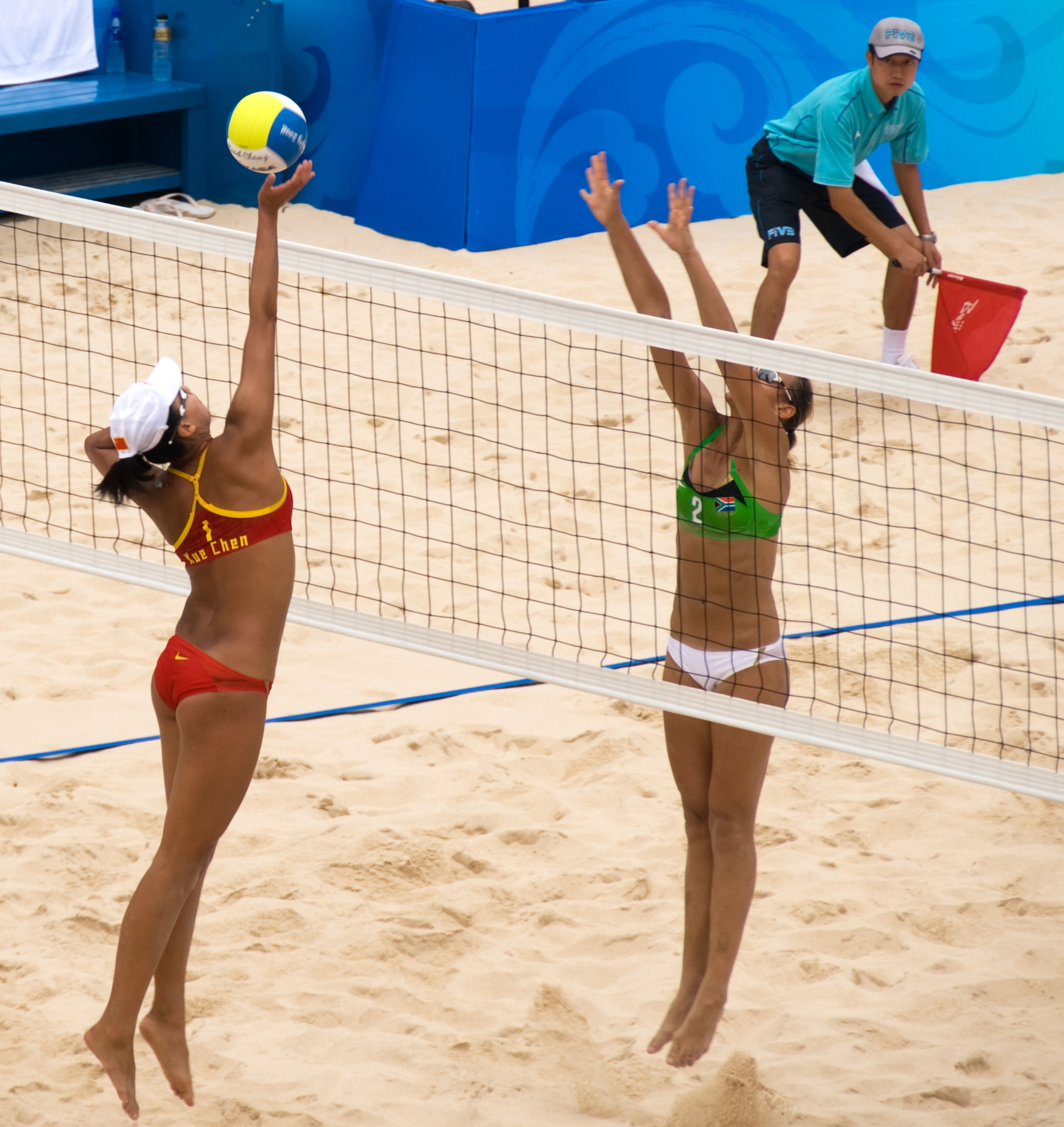
- Vita Nel (right) at the 2008 Summer Olympics in Beijing

Personal information
- Full name: Vitalina Nel
- Born: 11 December 1975 (age 50) Ukraine, Zaporizhzhia
- Height: 6 ft 0 in (1.83 m)
- Children: Vivienne Nel

Sport
- Country: South Africa
- Sport: Beach Volleyball

Achievements and titles
- Olympic finals: 2008 Summer Olympics

Vitalina "Vita" Nel (born 11 December 1975) is a South African olympic beach volleyballer who competed at the 2008 Summer Olympics. She was partnered with Judith Augoustides.
