= Thomas Kröger =

German volleyball player (born 1979)

Personal information
- Nationality: German
- Born: 11 June 1979 (age 47) Melle, West Germany

Sport
- Sport: Volleyball

Thomas Kröger (born 11 June 1979) is a German former volleyball player. He competed in the men's tournament at the 2008 Summer Olympics.
