= Nicole Schnyder-Benoit =

Swiss beach volleyball player (born 1973)

Personal information
- Nationality: (Switzerland) Swiss
- Born: March 13, 1973 (age 53); Magglingen, Switzerland
- Height: 177 cm (5 ft 10 in)
Honours
Women's beach volleyball
Representing Switzerland
European Championships
Gold medal – first place	2004 Timmendorfer Strand	Beach
Silver medal – second place	2001 Jesolo	Beach

Nicole Schnyder-Benoit (born March 13, 1973) is a retired professional beach volleyball player from Switzerland, who represented her native country at the 2004 Summer Olympics in Athens, Greece. Partnering Simone Kuhn she claimed the gold medal at the 2004 European Championships in Timmendorfer Strand, Germany. She has been Swiss beach volleyball champion seven times.

In 1992, she became third in Swiss championship in high jump.

Schnyder-Benoit is married and mother of 2 boys.

== Playing partners ==
- Simone Kuhn
- Magi Schlaefli
- Annalea Hartmann
- Nadia Erni
- Sandra Bratschi
- Franziska Frei
- Patricia Dormann
