= Leigh-Ann Naidoo =

South African beach volleyball player (born 1976)

Personal information
- Nationality: South Africa
- Born: 12 July 1976 (age 50); Durban, South Africa
- Height: 1.81 m (5 ft 11 1/2 in)
- Weight: 70 kg (154 lb)

Leigh-Ann Naidoo (born 12 July 1976 in Durban) is a South African beach volleyball player.

Naidoo began her career at the FIVB Beach Volleyball World Tour in 1999 attending only the Acapulco Open alongside Alena Schurkova. Already with partner Julia Willand she attended more stages in the 2004 season culminating with the participation in the 2004 Summer Olympics, in Athens. They lost all three matches in the group stage and did not advance to the medal round.

== Personal life ==
Naidoo currently resides in Cape Town and has been with her partner, Kelly Gillespie, since 2003. She is openly gay and in 2006 became an ambassador and keynote speaker of the Gay Games, in Chicago.

Naidoo was previously a Palestinian solidarity activist and, in 2016, participated in the Women's Boat to Gaza, an attempt to break the Israel maritime blockade of Hamas controlled Gaza. She was detained by Israeli authorities, processed and returned to South Africa within a day.
