= Angela Clarke (volleyball) =

Australian female volleyball player

Personal information
- Nationality: Australian
- Born: 2 November 1975 (age 50)
- Height: 1.86 m (6 ft 1 in)
- Weight: 70 kg (154 lb)

National team
2000	Australia

Angela Clarke (born 2 November 1975) was an Australian female volleyball player. She was part of the Australia women's national volleyball team.

She competed with the national team at the 2000 Summer Olympics in Sydney, Australia, finishing 9th.

== See also ==
- Australia at the 2000 Summer Olympics
