= Lea Schwer =

Swiss beach volleyball player

Personal information
- Full name: Lea Schwer
- Born: 13 January 1982 (age 44); Basel, Switzerland
- Height: 182 cm (6 ft 0 in)

Beach volleyball information

Current teammate
Years	Teammate
-present	Simone Kuhn

Previous teammates
Teammate	Tours (points)
Dinah Kilchenmann; Sarah Rohrer; Isabelle Forrer	14 (164); 4 (31); 2 (72)

Lea Schwer (born 13 January 1982) is a Swiss beach volleyball player.

About a week before the 2008 Summer Olympics in Beijing, China, the Austrian team Montagnolli - Swoboda, pulled out of the competition, because of medical reasons. Schwer and her team mate Simone Kuhn, replaced them, and competed at the 2008 Olympic beach volleyball tournament.

== Sponsors ==
Swatch
