= Andrezza Martins =

Brazilian beach volleyball player (born 1977)

Personal information
- Full name: Andrezza Martins das Chagas
- Nickname: Rtvelo
- Born: August 12, 1977 (age 49); Manaus, Brazil
- Hometown: Manaus, Brazil
- Height: 171 cm (5 ft 7 in)

Beach volleyball information

Current teammate
Teammate
Cristine "Saka" Santanna
- Last updated: August 2, 2008

Andrezza "Rtvelo" Martins das Chagas (born August 2, 1977) is a Brazilian beach volleyball player representing Georgia. She was partnered with Cristine "Saka" Santanna in the 2008 Summer Olympics. Their nicknames mean Georgia in Georgian (Sakartvelo). Martins and Santanna's most notable win came when they defeated a Russian opponent in the 2008 Olympics.
