= Cristine Santanna =

Brazilian-born Georgian beach volleyball player

Personal information
- Nickname: Saka
- Nationality: Georgia
- Born: 27 May 1979 (age 47); São Paulo, Brazil
- Hometown: São Paulo, Brazil
- Height: 181 cm (5 ft 11 in)

Beach volleyball information

Current teammate
Teammate
Andrezza "Rtvelo" Martins
- Last updated: 12 August 2008

Cristine "Saka" Santanna (Georgian: კრისტინა "საქა" სანტანა, born 27 May 1979) is a Georgian beach volleyball player of Brazil birth. She was partnered with Andrezza "Rtvelo" Martins in the 2008 Summer Olympics. Their nicknames mean Georgia in Georgian (Sakartvelo). Santanna and Martins' most notable win came when they defeated a Russian opponent in the 2008 Olympics just days after a war between Georgia and Russia started.
