= Efthalia Koutroumanidou =

Greek beach volleyball player (born 1982)

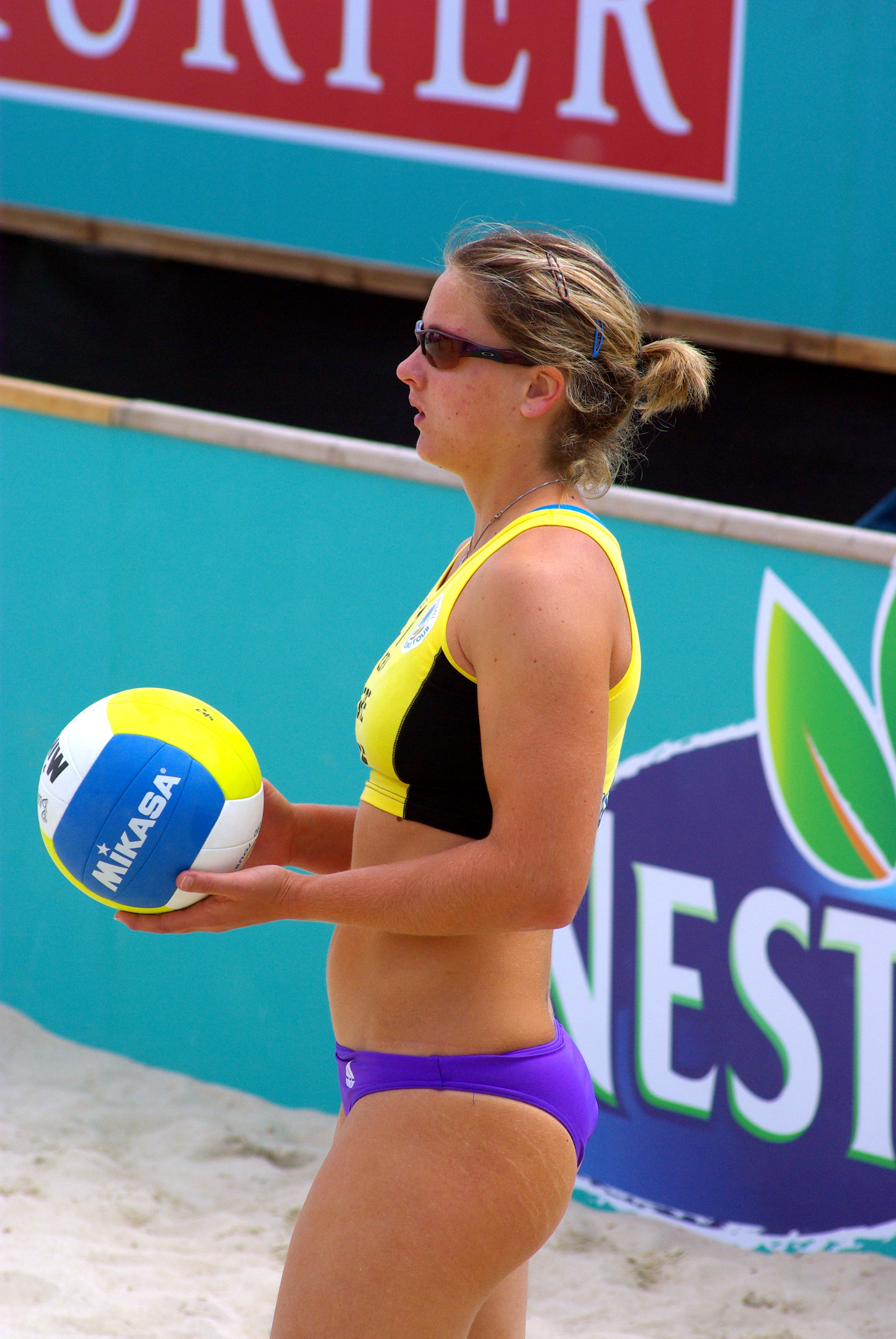
Thalia Koutroumanidou, 2008

Efthalia "Thaleia" Koutroumanidou (Greek: Ευθάληαα "Θάλεια" Κουτρουμανίδου; born 7 October 1982 in Volos) is a Greek Olympic beach volleyballer at the 2008 Summer Olympics and the 2004 Athens Olympics. She is partnered with Maria Tsiartsiani.
