= Simone Kuhn =

Swiss beach volleyball player (born 1980)

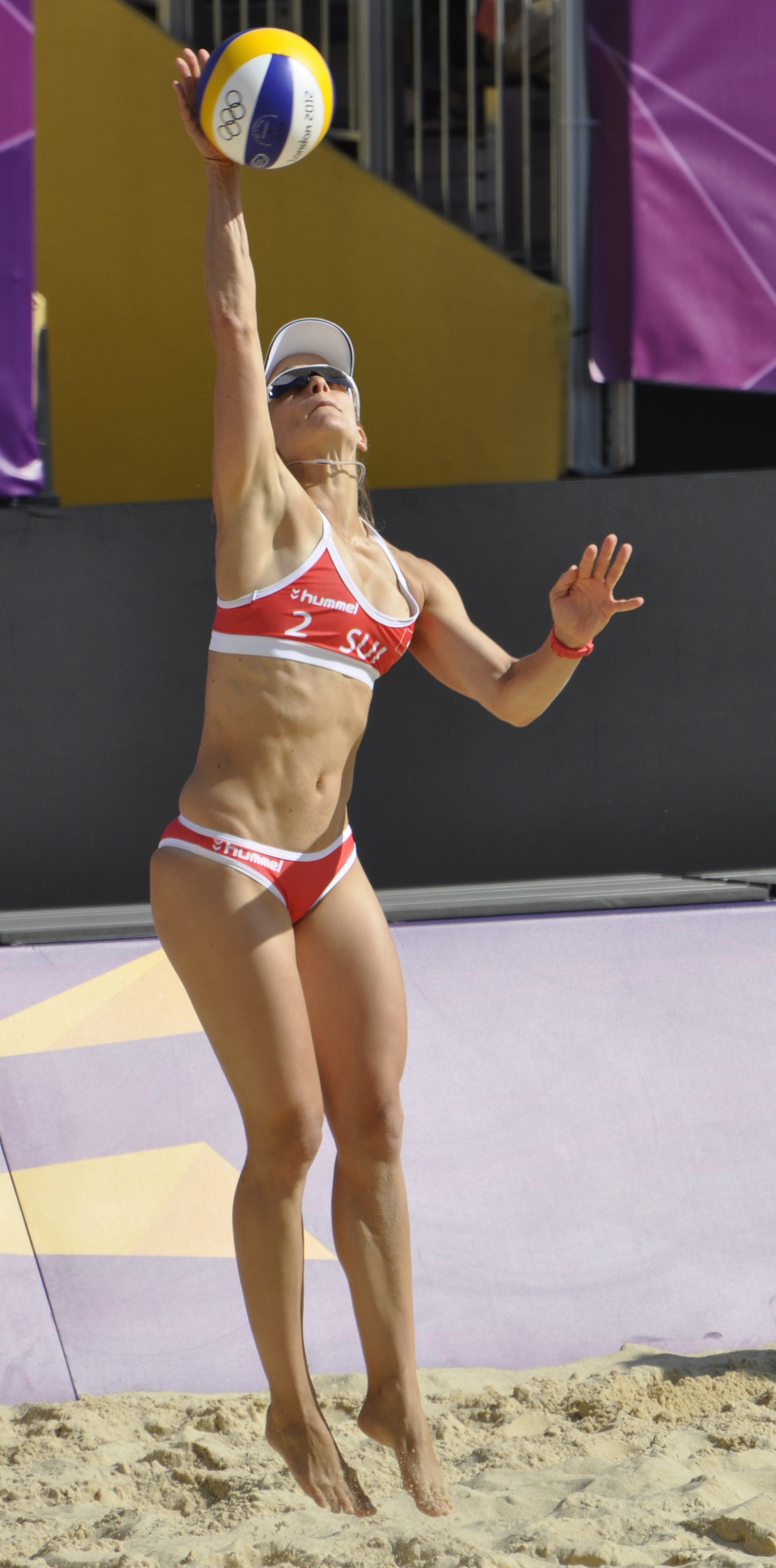
- Kuhn during the 2012 Summer Olympics

Personal information
- Nationality: Swiss
- Born: 2 September 1980 (age 46); Wattwil, Switzerland
- Height: 6 ft 0 in (183 cm)
Honours
Women's beach volleyball
Representing Switzerland
European Championships
Gold medal – first place	2004 Timmendorfer Strand	Beach
Silver medal – second place	2001 Jesolo	Beach

Simone Kuhn (born 2 September 1980) is a female professional beach volleyball player from Switzerland, who represented her native country at the beach volleyball tournaments of the 2004 Summer Olympics in Athens, Greece, the 2008 Summer Olympics in Beijing and the 2012 Summer Olympics in London. In 2004, she partnered with Nicole Schnyder-Benoit and lost all three pool matches. In 2008, she played alongside Lea Schwer and again lost all pool matches. In 2012, she partnered with Nadine Zumkehr and the pair reached the round of 16 where they were eliminated by the American pair of Jennifer Kessy and April Ross who went on to win silver.

Partnering Nicole Schnyder-Benoit she claimed the gold medal at the 2004 European Championships in Timmendorfer Strand, Germany.

== Playing partners ==
- Lea Schwer
- Nicole Schnyder-Benoit
- Annik Skrivan
- Nadine Zumkehr

== Sponsors ==
- Swatch
