= Ana Paula Henkel =

Brazilian volleyball player and journalist

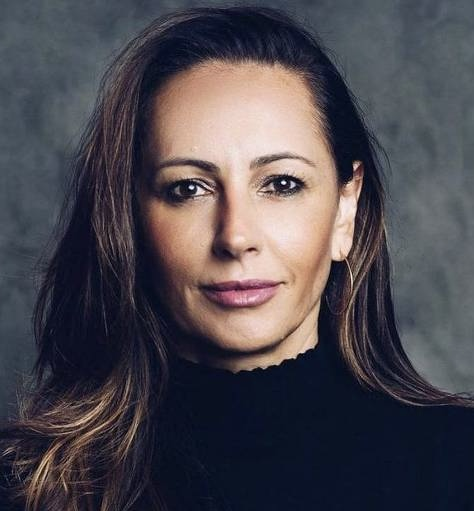
- Ana Paula Henkel

Personal information
- Full name: Ana Paula Rodrigues Henkel
- Nationality: Brazil and United States
- Born: 13 February 1972 (age 54); Lavras, Minas Gerais, Brazil
- Height: 1.83 m (6 ft 0 in)
- Weight: 68 kg (150 lb)
- Spike: 309 cm (122 in)
- Block: 284 cm (112 in)

Volleyball information
- Position: Middle blocker
- Number: 5

National team
1992–1998	Brazil
Honours
Women's volleyball
Representing Brazil
Summer Olympics
Bronze medal – third place	1996 Atlanta	Team
World Championship
Silver medal – second place	1994 Brazil	Team
World Grand Prix
Gold medal – first place	1994 Shanghai
Gold medal – first place	1996 Shanghai
Gold medal – first place	1998 Hong Kong
Silver medal – second place	1995 Shanghai
CSV South American Championship
Gold medal – first place	1995 Porto Alegre
Silver medal – second place	1993 Cusco

Ana Paula Rodrigues Henkel (born 13 February 1972), more commonly known as Ana Paula, is a Brazilian retired female volleyball player and journalist who represented Brazil at four Summer Olympics: in volleyball in 1992 and 1996, and in beach volleyball in 2004 and 2008. With Brazil women's national volleyball team, she won three World Grand Prix editions and got medals in various tournaments, including the 1996 Olympics in the United States and the 1994 FIVB World Championship in Japan. On the beach, she won the FIVB Beach Volleyball World Tour in 2003 (alongside Sandra Pires) and 2008 (with Shelda Bede).

In 2024, Ana Paula Henkel was indroduced into the Volleyball Hall of Fame.

She is currently a columnist for Revista Oeste and a political commentator on a program called Oeste Sem Filtro, broadcast on the video platforms Rumble and YouTube.

== Personal life ==
After retiring from volleyball in 2010, Paula moved to Los Angeles, California, where she majored in architecture at UCLA and is now studying to get a master's degree in political science. Noted for her conservative views, she had a column in newspaper O Estado de S. Paulo and joined news station Jovem Pan.

Paula has been married three times, first to basketballer Jeffty Connelly from 1994 to 1998, and then to volleyball coach Marcus Miranda, with whom she had a son. Since 2010, she has been married to attorney and retired beach volleyballer Carl Henkel. She was considering a fifth Olympic appearance in 2012.

== Individual Awards ==
- 1994 FIVB World Grand Prix – "Best Blocker"
- 1996 FIVB World Grand Prix – "Best Blocker"
- 1998 FIVB World Grand Prix – "Best Spiker"
- 1998 FIVB World Grand Prix – "Best Blocker"

Sporting positions
Preceded by Kerri Walsh and Misty May-Treanor (USA)	Women's FIVB Beach World Tour Winner alongside (Brazil) Sandra Pires; 2003	Succeeded by Adriana Behar and Shelda Bede (BRA)
Preceded by Larissa França and Juliana Felisberta (BRA)	Women's FIVB Beach World Tour Winner alongside (Brazil) Shelda Bede; 2008	Succeeded by Larissa França and Juliana Felisberta (BRA)
Awards
Preceded by (Cuba) Ana Fernández	Best Spiker of FIVB World Grand Prix; 1998	Succeeded by (Russia) Elizaveta Tichtchenko
Preceded by (China) Li Yan	Best Blocker of FIVB World Grand Prix; 1998	Succeeded by (Russia) Yelena Godina
Preceded by Inaugural	Women's FIVB World Tour "Best Server"; 2005 – 2007	Succeeded by Maria Clara Salgado (BRA)
Preceded by Juliana Felisberta and Larissa França (BRA)	Women's FIVB World Tour "Team of the Year" alongside (Brazil) Shelda Bede; 2008	Succeeded by Juliana Felisberta and Larissa França (BRA)
