= Imara Esteves Ribalta =

Cuban beach volleyball player

Imara Estévez Ribalta

Personal information
- Full name: Imara Estévez Ribalta
- Born: 15 April 1978 (age 48); Havana, Cuba
- Height: 1.71 m (5 ft 7 in)

National team
1998	Cuba
Honours
Women's volleyball
Representing Cuba
Central American and Caribbean Games
Gold medal – first place	1998 Maracaibo	Indoor

Imara Estévez Ribalta (born 15 April 1978) is a Cuban former beach volleyball player who participated in the 2008 Summer Olympics. She partnered with Milagros Crespo.
