= Tamara Larrea =

Cuban beach volleyball player (born 1973)

Personal information
- Full name: Tamara Larrea Peraza
- Born: November 25, 1973 (age 52) Havana, Cuba
Honours
Women's beach volleyball
Representing Cuba
Pan American Games
| Gold medal – first place | 2003 Santo Domingo | Beach |
| Silver medal – second place | 2007 Rio de Janeiro | Beach |
Central American and Caribbean Games
| Gold medal – first place | 2006 Cartagena | Beach |

Tamara Larrea Peraza (born November 25, 1973) is a female beach volleyball player from Cuba, who won the gold medal in the women's beach team competition at the 2003 Pan American Games in Santo Domingo, Dominican Republic, partnering Dalixia Fernández. She represented her native country at two consecutive Summer Olympics, starting in 2000 in Sydney, Australia.

Together with Fernandez, they also competed in the 2008 Summer Olympics in Beijing, China.
