= Maria Tsiartsiani =

Greek beach volleyball player (born 1980)

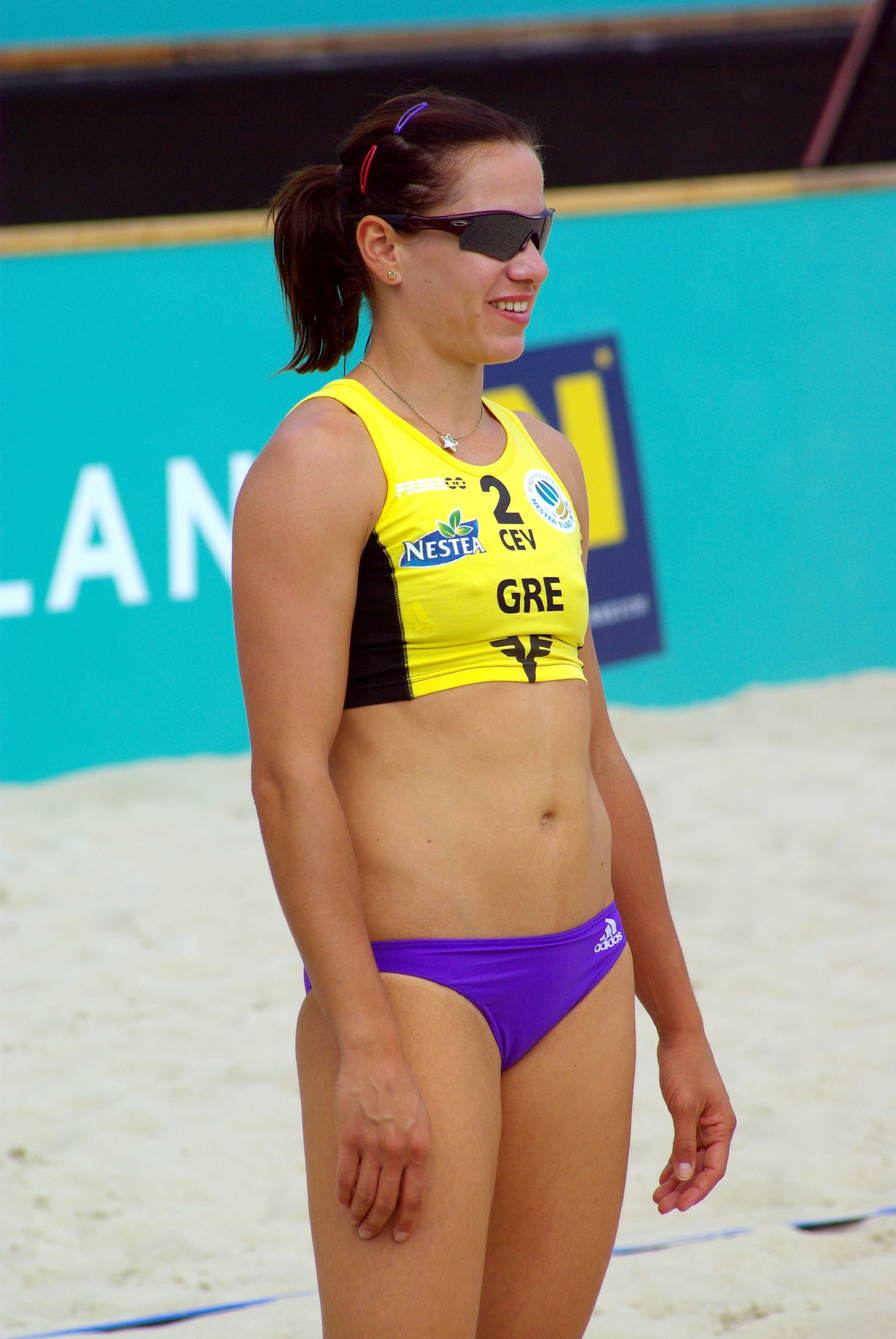
Maria Tsiartsiani, 2008

Maria Tsiartsiani (Greek: Μαρία Τσιαρτσανη; born 21 October 1980 in Thessaloniki) is a Greek Olympic beach volleyballer. She competed at the 2008 Summer Olympics, partnering with Efthalia Koutroumanidou. At the 2012 Summer Olympics, she competed with Vassiliki Arvaniti.
