= Dalixia Fernández =

Cuban beach volleyball player (born 1977)

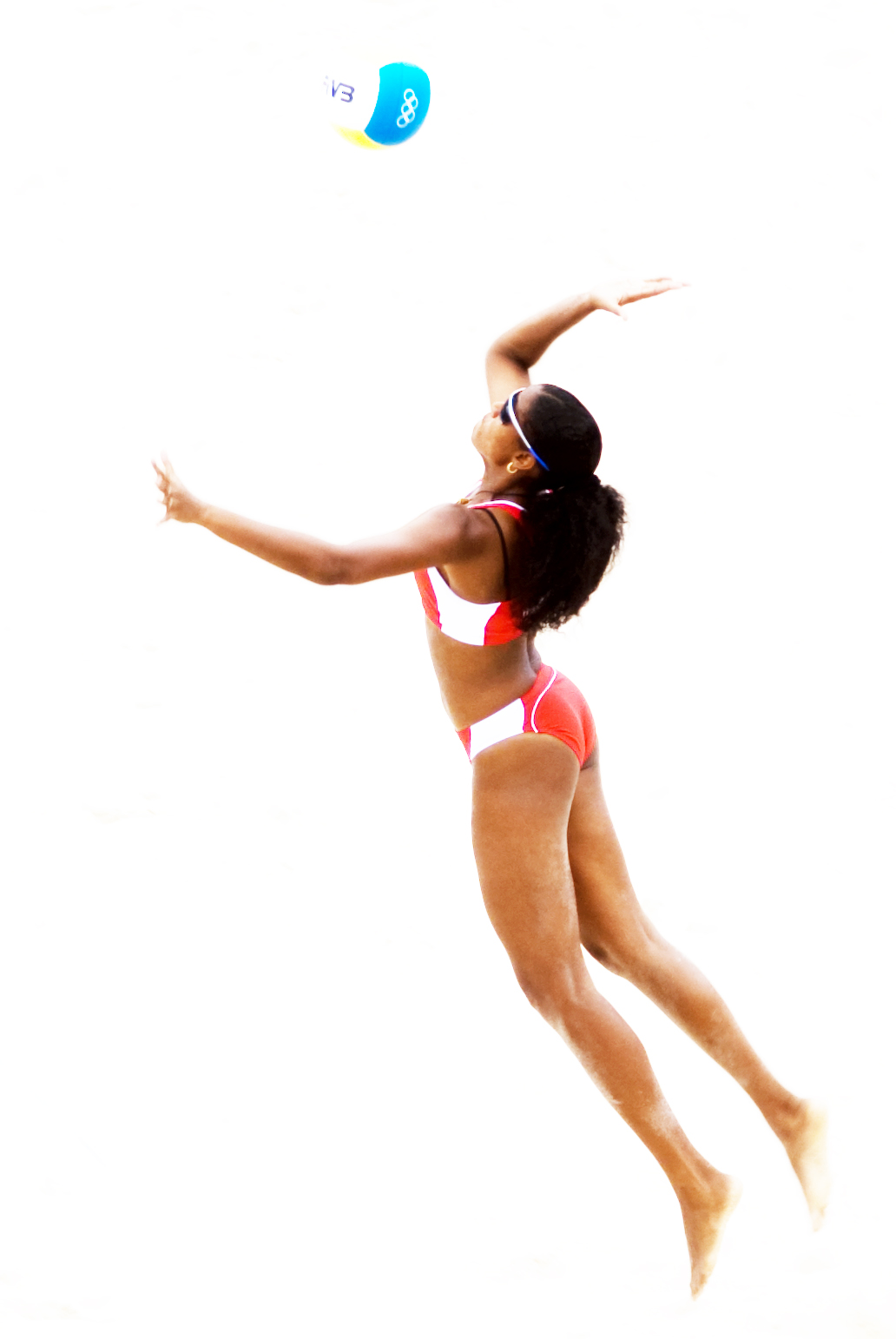
- Fernández during the 2008 Summer Olympics

Personal information
- Full name: Dalixia Fernández Grasset
- Born: November 26, 1977 (age 48) Guantanamo, Cuba
Honours
Women's beach volleyball
Representing Cuba
Pan American Games
Gold medal – first place	2003 Santo Domingo	Beach
Silver medal – second place	2007 Rio de Janeiro	Beach
Central American and Caribbean Games
Gold medal – first place	2006 Cartagena	Beach

Dalixia Fernández Grasset (born November 26, 1977) is a female beach volleyball player from Cuba, who won the gold medal in the women's beach team competition at the 2003 Pan American Games in Santo Domingo, Dominican Republic, partnering Tamara Larrea. She represented her native country at three consecutive Summer Olympics, starting in 2000 in Sydney, Australia.

Together with Tamara, they also competed in the 2008 Summer Olympics in Beijing, China.
