= European Championship Tour 2004 =

Tournament details
- Host country: Italy, Croatia, Germany, Czech Republic, Spain
- Dates: May – September, 2004
- Venue: (in 5 host cities)

The 2004 European Championship Tour (or the 2004 European Beach Volleyball Tour) was the European beach volleyball tour for 2004.

The tour consisted of five tournaments with both genders, including the 2004 Championship Final.

== Tournaments ==
- Italian Open, in Roseto degli Abruzzi, Italy – 12–16 May 2004
- Zagreb Challenger, in Zagreb, Croatia – 3–6 June 2004
- 2004 European Championship Final, in Timmendorfer Strand, Germany – 9–13 June 2004
- Slavkov Challenger, in Slavkov, Czech Republic – 6–8 August 2004
- Spanish Open, in Valencia, Spain – 9–12 September 2004

== Tournament results ==
=== Women ===
Event	Gold	Silver	Bronze
Italian Open	(Czech Republic) Ryšavá–Nováková	(Switzerland) Kuhn–Schnyder	(Italy) Bruschini–Solazzi
Zagreb Challenger	(Czech Republic) Felbabova–Novotná	(Germany) Augoustides-Kaup	(Czech Republic) Klapalova–Petrova
Final	(Switzerland) Kuhn–Schnyder	(Norway) Glesnes–Maaseide	(Italy) Daniela Gattelli–Lucilla Perrotta
Slavkov Challenger	(Czech Republic) Tychnova–Tychnova	(Latvia) Minusa–Pulina	(Ukraine) Baburina–Osheyko
Spanish Open	(Greece) Arvaniti–Koutroumanidou	(Norway) Hakedal–Torlen	(Bulgaria) Yanchulova–Yanchulova

=== Men ===
Event	Gold	Silver	Bronze
Italian Open	(Spain) Bosma–Herrera	(Germany) Dieckmann–Reckermann	(Switzerland) Egger–Heyer
Zagreb Challenger	(Germany) Ahmann–Hager	(Slovenia) Cuturic–Miklavc	(Czech Republic) Biza–Stejskal
Final	(Germany) Dieckmann–Reckermann	(Switzerland) Egger–Heyer	(Switzerland) Heuscher–Kobel
Slavkov Challenger	(Netherlands) De Gruijter–Ronnes	(Czech Republic) Michal Biza–Igor Stejskal	(Czech Republic) Premysl Kubala–Michal Palinek
Spanish Open	(Germany) Dieckmann–Scheuerpflug	(Germany) Ahmann–Hager	(Italy) Galli–Raffaelli

== Medal table by country ==
Position	Country	Gold	Silver	Bronze	Total
1.	Germany	3	3		6
2.	Czech Republic	3	1	3	7
3.	Switzerland	1	2	2	5
4.	Greece	1			1
4.	Spain	1			1
4.	Netherlands	1			1
7.	Norway		2		2
8.	Latvia		1		1
8.	Slovenia		1		1
9.	Italy			3	3
10.	Ukraine			1	1
10.	Bulgaria			1	1
