= Nestea European Championship Tour 2006 =

Tournament details
- Host country: Turkey, Germany, Russia, Spain, Switzerland, Netherlands
- Dates: May – August, 2006
- Venue: (in 6 host cities)

The 2006 NESTEA European Championship Tour (or the 2006 European Beach Volleyball Tour) was the European beach volleyball tour for 2006.

The tour consisted of six tournaments with both genders, including the 2006 Championship Final.

== Tournaments ==
- Nestea Turkish Masters, in Alanya, Turkey – 17–21 May 2006
- Nestea German Masters, in Hamburg, Germany – 31 May – 3 June 2006
- Nestea Russian Masters, in Moscow, Russia – 15–18 June 2006
- Nestea Spanish Masters, in Valencia, Spain – 20–23 July 2006
- Nestea Swiss Masters, in Lucerne, Switzerland – 5–8 August 2006
- 2006 Nestea European Championship Final, in The Hague, Netherlands – 25–28 August 2006

== Tournament results ==
=== Women ===
Event	Gold	Silver	Bronze
Nestea Turkish Masters	(Greece) Arvaniti-Karadassiou	(Norway) Hakedal-Torlen	(Netherlands) Kadijk-Mooren
Nestea German Masters	(Germany) Pohl-Rau	(Czech Republic) Felbabova-Novotna	(Netherlands) Keizer-Leenstra
Nestea Russian Masters	(Germany) Pohl-Rau	(Greece) Arvaniti-Karadassiou	(Netherlands) Kadijk-Mooren
Nestea Spanish Masters	(Germany) Pohl-Rau	(Switzerland) Kuhn-Schwer	(Germany) Goller-Ludwig
Nestea Swiss Masters	(Greece) Arvaniti-Karadassiou	(Norway) Hakedal-Torlen	(Netherlands) Keizer-Leenstra
Final	(Russia) Shiryaeva-Uryadova	(Netherlands) Kadijk-Mooren	(Norway) Hakedal-Torlen

=== Men ===
Event	Gold	Silver	Bronze
Nestea Turkish Masters	(Switzerland) Egger-Laciga	(Italy) Lione-Varnier	(Germany) Brink-Dieckmann
Nestea German Masters	(Germany) Brink-Dieckmann	(Germany) Klemperer-Schneider	(Netherlands) Nummerdor-Schuil
Nestea Russian Masters	(Switzerland) Egger-Laciga	(Germany) Koreng-Matysik	(Netherlands) Nummerdor-Schuil
Nestea Spanish Masters	(Netherlands) Nummerdor-Schuil	(Austria) Doppler-Gartmayer	(Switzerland) Egger-Laciga
Nestea Swiss Masters	(Germany) Brink-Dieckmann	(Estonia) Kais-Vesik	(Czech Republic) Biza-Kubala
Final	(Germany) Brink-Dieckmann	(Netherlands) De Gruijter-Ronnes	(Switzerland) Heuscher-Kobel

== Medal table by country ==
Rank	Nation	Gold	Silver	Bronze	Total
1	Germany	6	2	2	10
2	Switzerland	2	1	2	5
3	Greece	2	1	0	3
4	Netherlands	1	2	6	9
5	Russia	1	0	0	1
6	Norway	0	2	1	3
7	Czech Republic	0	1	1	2
8	Austria	0	1	0	1
8	Estonia	0	1	0	1
8	Italy	0	1	0	1
Totals (10 entries)		12	12	12	36
