= 2004 European Beach Volleyball Championships =

Beachvolleyball European Championship

These page shows the results of the 2004 European Beach Volleyball Championships, held from June 9 to June 13, 2004 in Timmendorfer Strand, Germany. It was the twelfth official edition of the men's event, which started in 1993, while the women competed for the eleventh time.

== Men's competition ==
- A total number of 39 participating couples

RANK	FINAL RANKING	EARNINGS	POINTS
1st place, gold medalist(s)	Markus Dieckmann and Jonas Reckermann (GER)	€ 17,000.00	200.0
2nd place, silver medalist(s)	Markus Egger and Sascha Heyer (SUI)	€ 12,500.00	180.0
3rd place, bronze medalist(s)	Patrick Heuscher and Stefan Kobel (SUI)	€ 9,000.00	160.0
4.	David Klemperer and Niklas Rademacher (GER)	€ 6,500.00	140.0
5.	Jörg Ahmann and Axel Hager (GER)	€ 4,500.00	120.0
5.	Iver Horrem and Björn Maaseide (NOR)	€ 4,500.00	120.0
5.	Javier Bosma and Pablo Herrera (ESP)	€ 4,500.00	120.0
5.	Björn Berg and Simon Dahl (SWE)	€ 4,500.00	120.0
9.	Nikolas Berger and Clemens Doppler (AUT)	€ 3,000.00	80.0
9.	Stéphane Canet and Mathieu Hamel (FRA)	€ 3,000.00	80.0
9.	Guilherm Deulofeu and Ogier Molinier (FRA)	€ 3,000.00	80.0
9.	Christoph Dieckmann and Andreas Scheuerpflug (GER)	€ 3,000.00	80.0
9.	Janis Grinbergs and Austris Štāls (LAT)	€ 3,000.00	80.0
9.	Vegard Høidalen and Jørre Kjemperud (NOR)	€ 3,000.00	80.0
9.	Nelson Brizida and José Pedrosa (POR)	€ 3,000.00	80.0
9.	Roman Arkaev and Dmitri Barsouk (RUS)	€ 3,000.00	80.0
17.	Julius Brink and Kjell Schneider (GER)	€ 2,000.00	40.0
17.	Dmitry Karasev and Anton Kulikovsky (RUS)	€ 2,000.00	40.0
19.	Kristjan Kais and Rivo Vesik (EST)	€ 1,500.00	20.0
19.	Haroldas Cyvas and Marius Vasiliauskas (LTU)	€ 1,500.00	20.0
19.	Jochem de Gruijter and Gijs Ronnes (NED)	€ 1,500.00	20.0
19.	Boudewijn Maas and Bram Ronnes (NED)	€ 1,500.00	20.0
19.	Mikhail Kouchnerev and Sergey Sayfulin (RUS)	€ 1,500.00	20.0
19.	Alfredo Tabarini and Francesco Tabarini (SMR)	€ 1,500.00	20.0
25.	Andreas Gortsianiouk and Emmanouil Xenakis (GRE)	€ 0.00	12.0
26.	Georgios Knapek and Panagiotis Mourtzios (GRE)	€ 0.00	12.0
26.	Alexandr Dyachenko and Oleksiy Kulinich (UKR)	€ 0.00	12.0
28.	Michal Biza and Igor Stejskal (CZE)	€ 0.00	8.0
28.	Jaroslav Pavlas and Miroslav Svoboda (CZE)	€ 0.00	8.0
28.	Kevin Ces and Yannick Salvetti (FRA)	€ 0.00	8.0
28.	Morten Klein and Christopher Sonnenbichler (GER)	€ 0.00	8.0
28.	Pavlos Beligratis and Thanassis Michalopoulos (GRE)	€ 0.00	8.0
28.	Antonio Cotrino and Juan Garcia Thompson (ESP)	€ 0.00	8.0
28.	Javier Luna and Raul Mesa (ESP)	€ 0.00	8.0
28.	Mykola Babich and Dmytro Khudoley (UKR)	€ 0.00	8.0
36.	Hannes Ambelang and Manuel Rieke (GER)	€ 0.00	4.0
36.	Eric Koreng and Marcus Popp (GER)	€ 0.00	4.0
36.	Daniel Krug and Mischa Urbatzka (GER)	€ 0.00	4.0
36.	Kay Matysik and Marvin Polte (GER)	€ 0.00	4.0

== Women's competition ==
- A total number of 46 participating couples

RANK	FINAL RANKING	EARNINGS	POINTS
1st place, gold medalist(s)	Simone Kuhn and Nicole Schnyder-Benoit (SUI)	€ 17,000.00	200.0
2nd place, silver medalist(s)	Susanne Glesnes and Kathrine Maaseide (NOR)	€ 12,500.00	180.0
3rd place, bronze medalist(s)	Daniela Gattelli and Lucilla Perrotta (ITA)	€ 9,000.00	160.0
4.	Eva Celbova and Sona Novakova (CZE)	€ 6,500.00	140.0
5.	Andrea Ahmann and Jana Vollmer (GER)	€ 4,500.00	120.0
5.	Stephanie Pohl and Okka Rau (GER)	€ 4,500.00	120.0
5.	Vasso Karadassiou and Efi Sfyri (GRE)	€ 4,500.00	120.0
5.	Laura Bruschini and Annamaria Solazzi (ITA)	€ 4,500.00	120.0
9.	Lina Yanchulova and Petia Yanchulova (BUL)	€ 3,000.00	80.0
9.	Lenka Hajecková and Petra Novotná (CZE)	€ 3,000.00	80.0
9.	Ethel-Julie Arjona and Virginie Kadjo (FRA)	€ 3,000.00	80.0
9.	Katrin Holtwick and Maria Kleefisch (GER)	€ 3,000.00	80.0
9.	Susanne Lahme and Danja Müsch (GER)	€ 3,000.00	80.0
9.	Vassiliki Arvaniti and Efthalia Koutroumanidou (GRE)	€ 3,000.00	80.0
9.	Katerina Nikolaidou and Maria Tsiartsiani (GRE)	€ 3,000.00	80.0
9.	Inguna Minusa and Inga Pulina (LAT)	€ 3,000.00	80.0
17.	Anna Bobrova and Natalya Uryadova (RUS)	€ 2,000.00	40.0
17.	Svitlana Baburina and Galyna Osheyko (UKR)	€ 2,000.00	40.0
19.	Barbara Hansel and Sara Montagnolli (AUT)	€ 1,500.00	20.0
19.	Nila Hakedal and Ingrid Tørlen (NOR)	€ 1,500.00	20.0
19.	Ester Alcon and Cati Pol (ESP)	€ 1,500.00	20.0
19.	Nadia Erni and Karin Trussel (SWE)	€ 1,500.00	20.0
19.	Dinah Kilchenmann and Lea Schwer (SUI)	€ 1,500.00	20.0
19.	Olena Lysenko and Natalya Shumeyko (UKR)	€ 1,500.00	20.0
25.	Katerina Tychnova and Marketa Tychnova (CZE)	€ 0.00	16.0
25.	Emilia Nyström and Erika Nyström (FIN)	€ 0.00	16.0
27.	Isabelle Czerveniak and Kerstin Pichler (AUT)	€ 0.00	12.0
27.	Judith Augoustides and Mireya Kaup (GER)	€ 0.00	12.0
27.	Helke Claasen and Martina Stoof (GER)	€ 0.00	12.0
27.	Sara Goller and Laura Ludwig (GER)	€ 0.00	12.0
27.	Sanne Keizer and Merel Mooren (NED)	€ 0.00	12.0
27.	Ewa Kalinowska and Agnieszka Kucypera (POL)	€ 0.00	12.0
27.	Magdalena Michon and Dorota Wojtczak (POL)	€ 0.00	12.0
27.	Olga Filina and Nadeida Zorina (RUS)	€ 0.00	12.0
35.	Hana Klapalova and Tereza Petrova (CZE)	€ 0.00	8.0
35.	Annikki Laine and Pia Tahjanjoki (FIN)	€ 0.00	8.0
35.	Tatiana Barerra and Claire Jaouen (FRA)	€ 0.00	8.0
35.	Rieke Brink-Abeler and Hella Jurich (GER)	€ 0.00	8.0
35.	Anne Friedrich and Jana Kohler (GER)	€ 0.00	8.0
35.	Antje Roder and Ulrike Schmidt (GER)	€ 0.00	8.0
35.	Csillia Gudmann and Orsoyla Mester (HUN)	€ 0.00	8.0
35.	Mered de Vries and Ingrid Visser (NED)	€ 0.00	8.0
35.	Katarzyna Ostrowska and Dorota Wrzochol (POL)	€ 0.00	8.0
35.	Anna Podgorniak and Marta Slodnik (POL)	€ 0.00	8.0
35.	Isabelle Forrer and Annik Skrivan (SUI)	€ 0.00	8.0
35.	Ganna Prygarnytska and Anastasiya Rayeva (UKR)	€ 0.00	8.0
