= 2007 Nestea European Championship final =

2007 European Beach Volleyball Championships
Tournament details
- Host country: Spain
- Dates: June 24–26, 2007
- Teams: 48
- Venue: (in Valencia host cities)

The 2007 NESTEA European Championship Final (or the 2007 European Beach Volleyball Championships,) was held from June 24 to June 26, 2007, in Valencia, Spain. It was the fifteenth official edition of the men's event, which started in 1993, while the women competed for the fourteenth time.

The Championships were part of the 2007 Nestea European Championship Tour.

The teams could earn qualifying points for the Beijing 2008 Olympics, from one of their two finishes at the 2007 or 2008 Championships.

== Men's competition ==
- A total number of 24 participating couples

RANK	FINAL RANKING	EARNINGS	POINTS
	Clemens Doppler and Peter Gartmayer (AUT)	€20,000.00	800.0
	Reinder Nummerdor and Richard Schuil (NED)	€15,000.00	720.0
	David Klemperer and Eric Koreng (GER)	€10,500.00	640.0
4.	Kristjan Kais and Rivo Vesik (EST)	€7,500.00	560.0
5.	Emiel Boersma and Bram Ronnes (NED)	€5,500.00	480.0
5.	Dmitri Barsouk and Igor Kolodinsky (RUS)	€5,500.00	480.0
7.	Renato Gomes and Jorge Terceiro (GEO)	€4,000.00	400.0
7.	Martin Laciga and Jan Schnider (SUI)	€4,000.00	400.0
9.	Julius Brink and Christoph Dieckmann (GER)	€3,000.00	32.0
9.	Florian Gosch and Alexander Horst (AUT)	€3,000.00	320.0
9.	Patrick Heuscher and Sascha Heyer (SUI)	€3,000.00	320.0
9.	Tim Joosen and Steve Roelandt (BEL)	€3,000.00	320.0
13.	Stefan Uhmann and Kay Matysik (GER)	€2,000.00	240.0
13.	Pablo Herrera and Raúl Mesa (ESP)	€2,000.00	240.0
13.	Riccardo Lione and Matteo Varnier (ITA)	€2,000.00	240.0
13.	Mykola Babich and Oleg Nikolaev (UKR)	€2,000.00	240.0
17.	Nikolas Berger and Robert Nowotny (AUT)	€1,000.00	160.0
17.	Grzegorz Fijalek and Krzysztof Orman (POL)	€1,000.00	160.0
17.	Vegard Høidalen and Jørre Kjemperud (NOR)	€1,000.00	160.0
17.	Inocencio Lario and Javier Luna (ESP)	€1,000.00	160.0
17.	Robert Kufa and Pavel Rotrekl (CZE)	€1,000.00	160.0
17.	Teis Corneliussen and Lars Mayland (DEN)	€1,000.00	160.0
17.	Premysl Kubala and Jaroslav Pavlas (CZE)	€1,000.00	160.0
17.	Josef Beneš and Petr Beneš (CZE)	€1,000.00	160.0

== Women's competition ==
- A total number of 24 participating couples

RANK	FINAL RANKING	EARNINGS	POINTS
	Vassiliki Arvaniti and Vasso Karadassiou (GRE)	€20,000.00	800.0
	Sara Goller and Laura Ludwig (GER)	€15,000.00	720.0
	Nila Håkedal and Ingrid Tørlen (NOR)	€10,500.00	640.0
4.	Alexandra Shiryaeva and Natalya Uryadova (RUS)	€7,500.00	560.0
5.	Helke Claasen and Antje Roder (GER)	€5,500.00	480.0
5.	Susanne Glesnes and Kathrine Maaseide (NOR)	€5,500.00	480.0
7.	Katrin Holtwick and Ilka Semmler (GER)	€4,000.00	400.0
7.	Marleen van Iersel and Marloes Wesselink (NED)	€4,000.00	400.0
9.	Stephanie Pohl and Okka Rau (GER)	€3,000.00	320.0
9.	Rebekka Kadijk and Merel Mooren (NED)	€3,000.00	320.0
9.	Sona Novaková and Petra Novotná (CZE)	€3,000.00	320.0
9.	Inese Jursone and Inguna Minusa (LAT)	€3,000.00	320.0
13.	Maria Bratkova and Evgenia Ukolova (RUS)	€2,000.00	240.0
13.	Celine Gemise and Mathilde Giordano (FRA)	€2,000.00	240.0
13.	Doris Schwaiger and Stefanie Schwaiger (AUT)	€2,000.00	240.0
13.	Svitlana Baburina and Galyna Osheyko (UKR)	€2,000.00	240.0
17.	Sara Montagnolli and Sabine Swoboda (AUT)	€1,000.00	160.0
17.	Olga Matveeva and Ester Alcon (ESP)	€1,000.00	160.0
17.	Meritxell Alseda and Cati Pol (ESP)	€1,000.00	160.0
17.	Nadia Erni and Muriel Graessli (SUI)	€1,000.00	160.0
17.	Inna Shmat and Natalia Stepanova (RUS)	€1,000.00	160.0
17.	Eva Celbová and Tereza Petrová (CZE)	€1,000.00	160.0
17.	Liesbeth Mouha and Liesbet Van Breedam (BEL)	€1,000.00	160.0
17.	Chrisi Gschweidl and Barbara Hansel (AUT)	€1,000.00	160.0
