= Swatch FIVB World Tour 2005 =

Tournament details
- Host country: Various
- Dates: May - November, 2005

The Swatch FIVB World Tour 2005 was the official international beach volleyball tour for 2005.

== Grand Slam ==
There were three Grand Slam tournaments. These events give a higher number of points and more money than the rest of the tournaments.

- Stavanger, Norway – ConocoPhillips Grand Slam, June 28 - July 3, 2005
- Paris, France – Beach Volleyball Paris-Ile de France Grand Slam, July 26–31, 2005
- Klagenfurt, Austria – A1 Grand Slam presented by Nokia, August 3–7, 2005

== Tournament results ==
=== Women ===
Event	Gold	Silver	Bronze
China Shanghai Jinshan Open	(Brazil) Juliana-Larissa	(Brazil) Adriana-Shelda	(Brazil) Ana Paula-Shaylyn
Japan Open	(Brazil) Ana Paula-Shaylyn	(Brazil) Juliana-Larissa	(Brazil) Adriana-Shelda
Italian Open	(Brazil) Juliana-Larissa	(Greece) Karadassiou-Arvaniti	(Germany) Pohl-Rau
1to1 Energy Open	(Brazil) Juliana-Larissa	(China) Jian Tia-Wang Fei	(Brazil) Adriana-Shelda
Swatch-FIVB; World Championships powered by Smart	(United States) May-Treanor-Walsh	(Brazil) Juliana-Larissa	(China) Jian Tia-Wang Fei
ConocoPhillips Grand Slam	(Greece) Karadassiou-Arvaniti	(Brazil) Juliana-Larissa	(China) Jian Tia-Wang Fei
St. Petersburg Open	(Brazil) Juliana-Larissa	(Brazil) Renata-Talita	(Brazil) Leila-Ana Paula
Portugal Open	(United States) May-Treanor-Walsh	(Greece) Koutroumanidou-Tsiartsiani	(Brazil) Juliana-Larissa
Beach Volleyball; Paris-Ile de France Grand Slam	(United States) May-Treanor-Walsh	(Brazil) Juliana-Larissa	(China) Jian Tia-Wang Fei
A1 Grand Slam presented by Nokia	(United States) May-Treanor-Walsh	(United States) Wacholder-Youngs	(China) Jian Tia-Wang Fei
Canada Open	(Brazil) Juliana-Larissa	(Brazil) Renata-Talita	(Brazil) Adriana-Shelda
Athens INFOTE Open	(Brazil) Renata-Talita	(Brazil) Juliana-Larissa	(Brazil) Adriana-Shelda
Indonesia Women's Open 2005	(Brazil) Renata-Talita	(Brazil) Adriana-Shelda	(Greece) Koutroumanidou-Tsiartsiani
Brazil Open	(United States) May-Treanor-Walsh	(Brazil) Juliana-Larissa	(United States) Wacholder-Youngs
Corona Acapulco Open	(Brazil) Juliana-Larissa	(United States) May-Treanor-Walsh	(United States) Wacholder-Youngs
South Africa Open	(United States) May-Treanor-Walsh	(Brazil) Juliana-Larissa	(Brazil) Carolina-Maria Clara

=== Men ===
Event	Gold	Silver	Bronze
China Shanghai Jinshan Open	(Germany) C. Dieckmann-Scheuerpflug	(Brazil) Emanuel-Ricardo	(Switzerland) Egger-M. Laciga
VIP Open	(Brazil) Marcio Araujo-Fabio	(Germany) M. Dieckmann-Reckerman	(Brazil) Emanuel-Ricardo
1to1 Energy Open	(Brazil) Emanuel-Ricardo	(Brazil) Benjamin-Harley	(Brazil) Marcio Araujo-Fabio
Swatch-FIVB; World Championships powered by Smart	(Brazil) Marcio Araujo-Fabio	(Switzerland) Heyer-P. Laciga	(Germany) Brink-Schneider
ConocoPhillips Grand Slam	(Brazil) Emanuel-Ricardo	(Brazil) Benjamin-Harley	(Switzerland) Heuscher-Kobel
St. Petersburg Open	(Brazil) Emanuel-Ricardo	(Brazil) Marcio Araujo-Fabio	(Brazil) Franco-Tande
Portugal Open	(Germany) Brink-Schneider	(Germany) M. Dieckmann-Reckerman	(Brazil) Marcio Araujo-Fabio
Mazury Open	(Switzerland) Egger-M. Laciga	(Germany) M. Dieckmann-Reckerman	(Brazil) Emanuel-Ricardo
Beach Volleyball; Paris-Ile de France Grand Slam	(Switzerland) Heuscher-Kobel	(United States) Gibb-Metzger	(Germany) Brink-Schneider
A1 Grand Slam presented by Nokia	(Germany) C. Dieckmann-Scheuerpflug	(Brazil) Emanuel-Ricardo	(Brazil) Marcio Araujo-Fabio
Canada Open	(Brazil) Benjamin-Harley	(Brazil) Marcio Araujo-Fabio	(Brazil) Emanuel-Ricardo
Athens INFOTE Open	(Brazil) Emanuel-Ricardo	(Switzerland) Egger-M. Laciga	(Brazil) Benjamin-Harley
Brazil Open	(Brazil) Emanuel-Ricardo	(Brazil) Marcio Araujo-Fabio	(United States) Gibb-Metzger
Corona Acapulco Open	(Brazil) Emanuel-Ricardo	(Brazil) Cunha-Franco	(Brazil) Benjamin-Harley
South Africa Open	(Brazil) Marcio Araujo-Fabio	(Switzerland) Egger-M. Laciga	(United States) Gibb-Metzger

== Medal table by country ==
Rank	Nation	Gold	Silver	Bronze	Total
1	Brazil (BRA)	19	19	17	55
2	United States (USA)	6	3	4	13
3	Germany (GER)	3	3	3	9
4	Switzerland (SUI)	2	3	2	7
5	Greece (GRE)	1	2	1	4
6	China (CHN)	0	1	4	5
Totals (6 entries)		31	31	31	93
