= Swatch FIVB World Tour 2006 =

Tournament details
- Host country: Various
- Dates: May - October, 2006

The Swatch FIVB World Tour 2006 was the 2006 official international beach volleyball tour.

== Grand Slam ==
There were four Grand Slam tournaments. These events give a higher number of points and more money than the rest of the tournaments.

- Gstaad, Switzerland – Grand Slam, June 20–25, 2006
- Stavanger, Norway – Grand Slam, June 27 - July 2, 2006
- Paris, France – Grand Slam, July 25–30, 2006
- Klagenfurt, Austria – Grand Slam, August 2–6, 2006

== Tournament results ==
=== Women ===
Event	Gold	Silver	Bronze
Italy, Open	(Brazil) Juliana-Larissa	(United States) May-Treanor-Walsh	(China) Wang Jie-Tian Jia
China, Open	(China) Xue Chen-Zhang Xi	(China) Wang Jie-Tian Jia	(Brazil) Juliana-Larissa
Greece, Open	(United States) May-Treanor-Walsh	(China) Wang Lu-Ji Linjun	(Brazil) Juliana-Larissa
Switzerland, Grand Slam	(United States) May-Treanor-Walsh	(Brazil) Juliana-Larissa	(China) Wang Jie-Tian Jia
Norway, Grand Slam	(Brazil) Juliana-Larissa	(Brazil) Adriana Behar-Shelda	(Brazil) Leila-Ana Paula
France, Open	(Brazil) Juliana-Larissa	(Brazil) Adriana Behar-Shelda	(Brazil) Leila-Ana Paula
Canada, Open	(Brazil) Leila-Ana Paula	(Brazil) Juliana-Larissa	(China) Wang Jie-Tian Jia
Russia, Open	(Brazil) Juliana-Larissa	(China) Xue Chen-Zhang Xi	(Brazil) Adriana Behar-Shelda
France, Grand Slam	(Brazil) Juliana-Larissa	(United States) May-Treanor-Walsh	(Brazil) Leila-Ana Paula
Austria, Grand Slam	(China) Wang Jie-Tian Jia	(Brazil) Juliana-Larissa	(Germany) Pohl-Rau
Poland, Open	(China) Wang Jie-Tian Jia	(China) Xue Chen-Zhang Xi	(Brazil) Leila-Ana Paula
Portugal, Open	(Brazil) Juliana-Larissa	(Brazil) Renata-Talita	(China) Wang Jie-Tian Jia
Brazil, Open	(Brazil) Juliana-Larissa	(Brazil) Leila-Ana Paula	(United States) May-Treanor-Walsh
Mexico, Open	(United States) May-Treanor-Walsh	(Brazil) Renata-Talita	(Norway) Hakedal-Tørlen
Thailand, Open	(China) Xue Chen-Zhang Xi	(China) Wang Jie-Tian Jia	(United States) May-Treanor-Walsh

=== Men ===
Event	Gold	Silver	Bronze
China, Open	(Brazil) Marcio Araujo-Fabio	(Brazil) Cunha-Franco	(Germany) Brink-Dieckmann
Croatia, Open	(Brazil) Emanuel-Ricardo	(United States) Dalhausser-Rogers	(United States) Lambert-Metzger
Italy, Open	(Switzerland) Heuscher-Kobel	(Brazil) Emanuel-Ricardo	(Brazil) Benjamin-Harley
Portugal, Open	(Germany) Brink-Dieckmann	(Brazil) Emanuel-Ricardo	(Brazil) Cunha-Franco
Switzerland, Grand Slam	(Brazil) Emanuel-Ricardo	(Brazil) Marcio Araujo-Fabio	(Germany) Brink-Dieckmann
Norway, Grand Slam	(Brazil) Emanuel-Ricardo	(Brazil) Marcio Araujo-Fabio	(Brazil) Benjamin-Harley
France, Open	(Brazil) Emanuel-Ricardo	(Brazil) Marcio Araujo-Fabio	(Brazil) Cunha-Franco
Canada, Open	(Brazil) Marcio Araujo-Fabio	(Brazil) Emanuel-Ricardo	(Brazil) Cunha-Franco
Russia, Open	(Brazil) Marcio Araujo-Fabio	(Germany) Brink-Dieckmann	(Netherlands) De Gruijter-Ronnes
France, Grand Slam	(Brazil) Marcio Araujo-Fabio	(United States) Gibb-Rosenthal	(Brazil) Emanuel-Ricardo
Austria, Grand Slam	(United States) Dalhausser-Rogers	(Brazil) Emanuel-Ricardo	(Brazil) Marcio Araujo-Fabio
Poland, Open	(Brazil) Emanuel-Ricardo	(Brazil) Cunha-Franco	(China) Wu-Xu
Brazil, Open	(Germany) Brink-Dieckmann	(United States) Gibb-Rosenthal	(Brazil) Cunha-Franco
Mexico, Open	(United States) Gibb-Rosenthal	(Brazil) Emanuel-Ricardo	(United States) Dalhausser-Rogers

== Medal table by country ==
Rank	Nation	Gold	Silver	Bronze	Total
1	Brazil (BRA)	17	18	15	50
2	United States (USA)	5	5	4	14
3	China (CHN)	4	5	5	14
4	Germany (GER)	2	1	3	6
5	Switzerland (SUI)	1	0	0	1
6	Netherlands (NED)	0	0	1	1
6	Norway (NOR)	0	0	1	1
Totals (7 entries)		29	29	29	87
