= 2006 Nestea European Championship final =

European sporting event

The 2006 NESTEA European Championship Final (or the 2006 European Beach Volleyball Championships,) was held from August 25 to August 28, 2006, in The Hague, Netherlands. It was the fourteenth official edition of the men's event, which started in 1993, while the women competed for the thirteenth time.

The Championships were part of the 2006 Nestea European Championship Tour.

== Men's competition ==
- A total number of 24 participating couples

RANK	FINAL RANKING	EARNINGS	POINTS
	Julius Brink and Christoph Dieckmann (GER)	€20,000.00	800.0
	Jochem de Gruijter and Gijs Ronnes (NED)	€15,000.00	720.0
	Patrick Heuscher and Stefan Kobel (SUI)	€10,500.00	640.0
4.	Nikolas Berger and Peter Gartmayer (AUT)	€7,500.00	560.0
5.	Paul Laciga and Martin Laciga (SUI)	€5,500.00	480.0
5.	David Klemperer and Kjell Schneider (GER)	€5,500.00	480.0
7.	Pablo Herrera and Raúl Mesa (ESP)	€4,000.00	400.0
7.	Kristjan Kais and Rivo Vesik (EST)	€4,000.00	400.0
9.	Reinder Nummerdor and Richard Schuil (NED)	€3,000.00	32.0
9.	Tim Joosen and Dieter Melis (BEL)	€3,000.00	320.0
9.	Emiel Boersma and Mathijs Mast (NED)	€3,000.00	320.0
9.	Jørre Kjemperud and Tarjei Skarlund (NOR)	€3,000.00	320.0
13.	Eric Koreng and Kay Matysik (GER)	€2,000.00	240.0
13.	Michal Biza and Premysl Kubala (CZE)	€2,000.00	240.0
13.	Iver Horrem and Bard-Inge Pettersen (NOR)	€2,000.00	240.0
13.	Mykola Babich and Oleg Nikolaev (UKR)	€2,000.00	240.0
17.	Javier Bosma and Inocencio Lario (ESP)	€1,000.00	160.0
17.	Kjell Goranson and Vegard Høidalen (NOR)	€1,000.00	160.0
17.	Fabio Galli and Andrea Raffaelli (ITA)	€1,000.00	160.0
17.	Dmitri Barsouk and Igor Kolodinsky (RUS)	€1,000.00	160.0
17.	Eugenio Amore and Riccardo Lione (ITA)	€1,000.00	160.0
17.	Josef Beneš and Petr Beneš (CZE)	€1,000.00	160.0
17.	Javier Luna and Francisco Rodriguez (ESP)	€1,000.00	160.0
17.	Andrea Tomatis and Matteo Varnier (ITA)	€1,000.00	160.0

== Women's competition ==
- A total number of 24 participating couples

RANK	FINAL RANKING	EARNINGS	POINTS
	Alexandra Shiryaeva and Natalya Uryadova (RUS)	€20,000.00	800.0
	Rebekka Kadijk and Merel Mooren (NED)	€15,000.00	720.0
	Nila Håkedal and Ingrid Tørlen (NOR)	€10,500.00	640.0
4.	Sara Goller and Laura Ludwig (GER)	€7,500.00	560.0
5.	Stephanie Pohl and Okka Rau (GER)	€5,500.00	480.0
5.	Sarka Nakladalová and Tereza Tobiasová (CZE)	€5,500.00	480.0
7.	Vassiliki Arvaniti and Vasso Karadassiou (GRE)	€4,000.00	400.0
7.	Sara Montagnolli and Sabine Swoboda (AUT)	€4,000.00	400.0
9.	Lenka Hajecková and Petra Novotná (CZE)	€3,000.00	320.0
9.	Sanne Keizer and Marrit Leenstra (NED)	€3,000.00	320.0
9.	Efthalia Koutroumanidou and Maria Tsiartsiani (GRE)	€3,000.00	320.0
9.	Lina Yanchulova and Petia Yanchulova (BUL)	€3,000.00	320.0
13.	Simone Kuhn and Lea Schwer (SUI)	€2,000.00	240.0
13.	Liesbeth Mouha and Liesbet Van Breedam (BEL)	€2,000.00	240.0
13.	Daniela Gattelli and Lucilla Perrotta (ITA)	€2,000.00	240.0
13.	Nadia Campisi and Clara Lozano (ESP)	€2,000.00	240.0
17.	Doris Schwaiger and Stefanie Schwaiger (AUT)	€1,000.00	160.0
17.	Annalea Hartmann and Karin Trussel (SUI)	€1,000.00	160.0
17.	Deborah Giaoui and Mathilde Giordano (FRA)	€1,000.00	160.0
17.	Olga Matveeva and Teresa Zunzunegui (ESP)	€1,000.00	160.0
17.	Inese Jursone and Inguna Minusa (LAT)	€1,000.00	160.0
17.	Svitlana Baburina and Galyna Osheyko (UKR)	€1,000.00	160.0
17.	Emilia Nyström and Erika Nyström (FIN)	€1,000.00	160.0
17.	Michaela Eckl and Mireya Kaup (GER)	€1,000.00	160.0
