= Pedro Solberg =

Brazilian volleyball player

Pedro Salgado Solberg
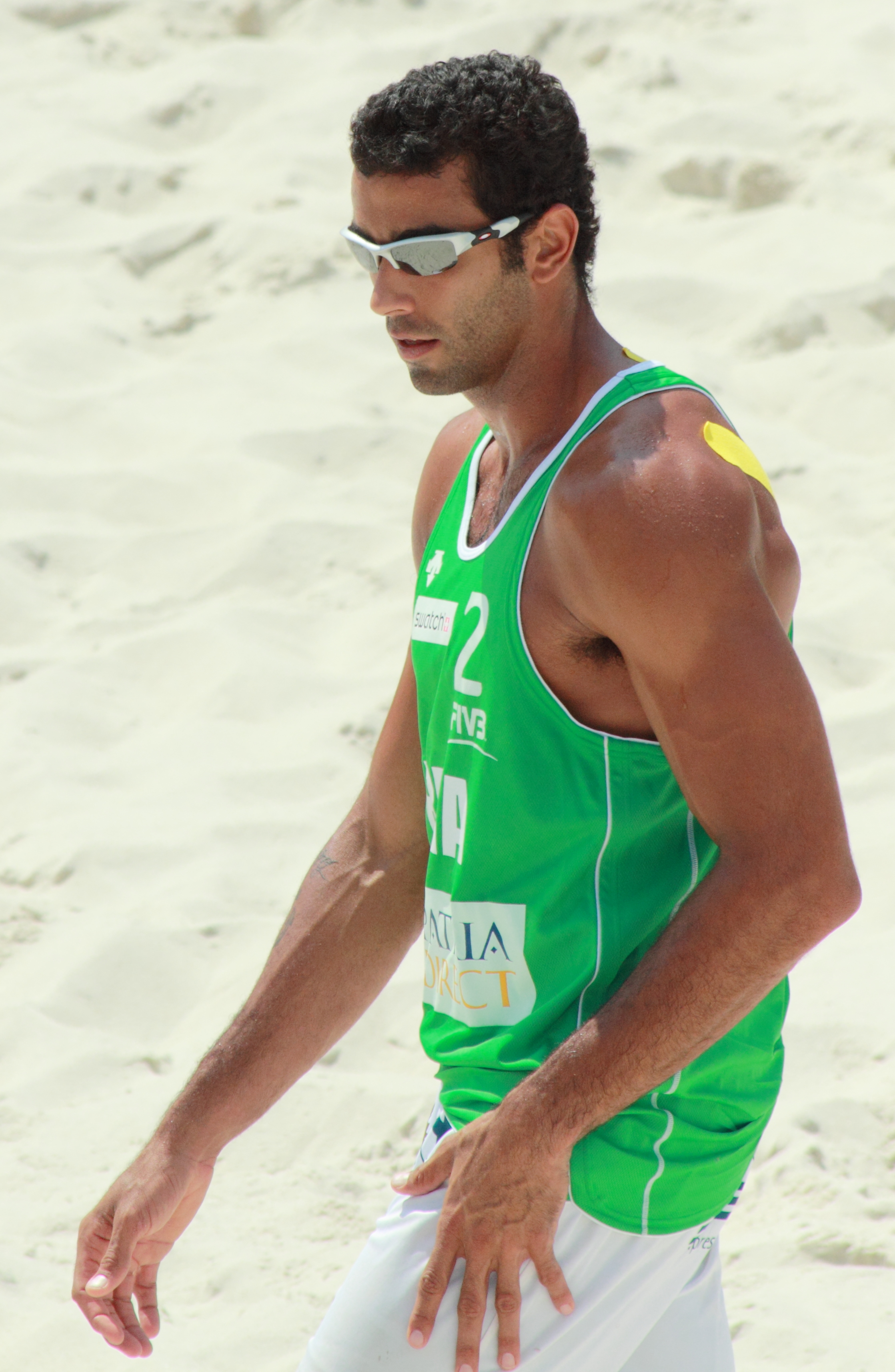
- Solberg at the FIVB World Tour in Prague, 2011

Personal information
- Full name: Pedro Salgado Collett Solberg
- Nationality: Brazilian
- Born: 27 March 1986 (age 40); Rio de Janeiro, Brasil
- Height: 6 ft 4 in (193 cm)

Beach volleyball information

Current teammate
Teammate
Evandro Gonçalves

Previous teammates
| Years | Teammate |
|---|---|
| 2006; 2007–2008; 2009; 2010; 2011; 2011– | Roberto Lopes; Harley Marques several partners Harley Marques; Pedro Cunha; Rhooney Ferramenta |
Honours
Men's beach volleyball
Representing Brazil
World Championships
| Bronze medal – third place | 2015 The Hague | Beach |

Pedro Salgado Collett Solberg (born 27 March 1986) is a Brazilian male beach volleyball player.

Solberg's mother, Isabel Salgado, was herself a successful beach volleyball player who in 1994 won a FIVB World Tour event in Miami. His sisters Maria Clara Salgado and Carolina Solberg Salgado are also beach volleyball players who have played since 2005.

== Career ==
Solberg won the U18 World Championship with three different partners in 2002 and U21 in 2003 and 2006 in beach volleyball. In 2006 he started with Roberto Lopes at several FIVB World Tour tournaments with fourth place being his best result. In the following two years Pedro Solberg together with his new partner Harley Marques won nine tournament victories in the 2008 FIVB World Tour, and were voted "Team of the Year".

In the 2009 season Solberg played with different partners. He started with his first partner in an FIVB World Tour tournament Pedro Cunha where he won two silver medals, while with Benjamin Insfran he won the Polish Open in Stare Jabłonki. Two fourth places with Ricardo Santos marked the end of the year.

=== 2010 ===
After a fifth place with Santos in the Brasília Open, he decided to have another collaboration with Marques, his partner in the successful 2007 and 2008 years. They won the next tournament in Shanghai, but in subsequent events could only muster one other place at the front of the field: fifth place at the Grand Slam in Moscow. After two ninth place finishes in Stavanger and Gstaad, a seventeenth place in Klagenfurt and another fifth place in Stare Jablonki, Solberg/Marques won the silver medal in Kristiansand. They defeated their compatriots including Insfran/Bruno Oscar Schmidt and Emanuel Rego/Alison Cerutti, but lost the final against the Americans Todd Rogers/Phil Dalhausser. At the end of the season Solberg/Marques still reached ninth place in Åland and The Hague.

=== 2011 ===
In the first four events of the year, Solberg began playing with Cunha, and their best finish was fourth place in Prague. With his new partner Rhooney Ferramenta, he reached fifth place in the fifth event of the season, including the World Championships in Rome. In Stavanger, the two Brazilians ranked 25th, and were ninth in Gstaad. Solberg was then removed because of a doping suspicion. The suspension was provisionally lifted in mid-August because of a delay in testing that was not the fault of the athlete. In October, the International Volleyball Federation closed the doping charges after concluding that "there is no evidence of an anti-doping rule violation". In Agadir, Morocco, he won the bronze medal with Ferramenta in the final event of the season.

Sporting positions
| Preceded by Emanuel Rego and Ricardo Santos (BRA) | Men's FIVB Beach Volley World Tour Winner alongside (Brazil) Harley Marques; 2008 | Succeeded by Julius Brink and Jonas Reckermann (GER) |
Awards
| Preceded by Phil Dalhausser (USA) | Men's FIVB World Tour "Best Blocker"; 2013 | Succeeded by Phil Dalhausser (USA) |
| Preceded by Emanuel Rego and Ricardo Santos (BRA) | Men's FIVB World Tour "Team of the Year" alongside (Brazil) Harley Marques; 2008 | Succeeded by Julius Brink and Jonas Reckermann (GER) |
