= Harley Marques Silva =

Brazilian beach volleyball player (born 1974)

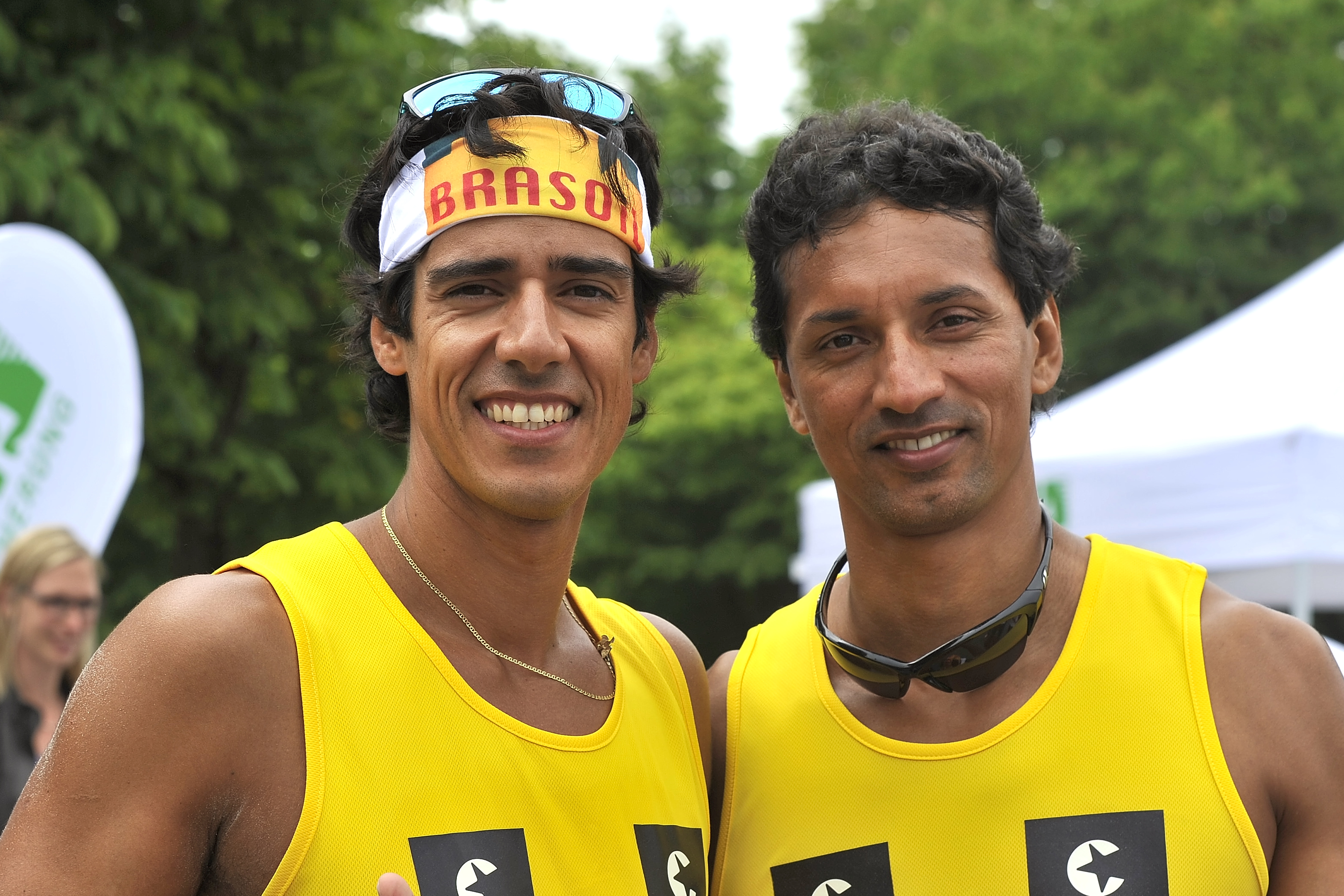
- Harley Marques and Benjamin Insfran 2013

Personal information
- Born: 6 July 1974 (age 52); Rio de Janeiro, Brazil
- Height: 6 ft 4 in (193 cm)
Honours
Men's beach volleyball
Representing Brazil
World Championships
Silver medal – second place	2009 Stavanger	Beach
World Tour
Gold medal – first place	2002 Berlin	Beach
Gold medal – first place	2003 Berlin	Beach
Gold medal – first place	2005 Montreal	Beach
Gold medal – first place	2007 Shanghai	Beach
Gold medal – first place	2007 Aland	Beach
Gold medal – first place	2007 St. Petersburg	Beach
Gold medal – first place	2008 Adelaide	Beach
Gold medal – first place	2008 Shanghai	Beach
Gold medal – first place	2008 Roseto degli Abruzzi	Beach
Gold medal – first place	2008 Gstaad	Beach
Gold medal – first place	2008 Mallorca	Beach
Gold medal – first place	2008 Guaruja	Beach
Gold medal – first place	2008 Sanya	Beach
Gold medal – first place	2009 Shanghai	Beach
Gold medal – first place	2009 Myslowice	Beach
Silver medal – second place	2005 Gstaad	Beach
Silver medal – second place	2005 Stavanger	Beach
Silver medal – second place	2009 Brasilia	Beach
Bronze medal – third place	2004 Cape Town	Beach
Bronze medal – third place	2005 Athens	Beach
Bronze medal – third place	2005 Acapulco	Beach
Bronze medal – third place	2006 Roseto degli Abruzzi	Beach
Bronze medal – third place	2006 Stavanger	Beach
Bronze medal – third place	2007 Manama	Beach
Bronze medal – third place	2007 Montreal	Beach
Bronze medal – third place	2008 Dubai	Beach
Bronze medal – third place	2009 Rome	Beach

Harley Marques Silva (born 6 July 1974) is a Brazilian beach volleyball player.

Team Harley – Pedro, was placed as #5 on the international Olympic ranking for the 2008 Summer Olympics, but did not qualify because of the two teams per country rule.

Harley – Pedro was ranked as #2 on the beach volley world ranking per 21 July 2008, and #1 per 4 August and 17 November 2008.

== Playing partners ==
- Pedro Solberg Salgado
- Benjamin Insfran
- Franco Neto
- Rogerio Ferreira
- Alison Cerutti
- Luizao Correa
- Fred Souza

Sporting positions
Preceded by Emanuel Rego and Ricardo Santos (BRA)	Men's FIVB Beach Volley World Tour Winner alongside (Brazil) Pedro Solberg Salgado; 2008	Succeeded by Julius Brink and Jonas Reckermann (GER)
Awards
Preceded by Todd Rogers (USA)	Men's FIVB Beach World Tour "Most Inspirational"; 2009	Succeeded by Xu Linyin (CHN)
Preceded by Ricardo Santos (BRA)	Men's FIVB Beach World Tour "Most Outstanding"; 2008–2009	Succeeded by Phil Dalhausser (USA)
Preceded by Emanuel Rego and Ricardo Santos (BRA)	Men's FIVB World Tour "Team of the Year" alongside (Brazil) Pedro Solberg Salgado; 2008	Succeeded by Julius Brink and Jonas Reckermann (GER)
