= Maaseide =

Maaseide is a surname. Notable people with the surname include:

- Bjørn Maaseide (born 1968), Norwegian beach volleyball player
- Kathrine Maaseide (born 1976), Norwegian beach volleyball player, sister of Bjørn
