= 2009 Beach Volleyball World Championships =

2009 World Championship
- Location: Stavanger, Norway
- Dates: 26 June – 5 July
- Website: Official website

Champions
- Men: Germany; Julius Brink; Jonas Reckermann
- Women: United States; April Ross; Jennifer Kessy

The 2009 SWATCH FIVB Beach Volleyball World Championships is a beach volleyball event, that was held from June 26 to July 5, 2009 in Stavanger, Norway. The Swatch FIVB World Championships are organized every two years, and Norway is the first Northern European country to host the event. The city of Stavanger had earlier hosted ten Open and Grand Slam events at the SWATCH FIVB World Tour.

The 2009 event was the seventh official edition of the championship, after ten unofficial championships (1987–1996) all held in Rio de Janeiro, Brazil.

The total Prize Money for 2009 was US$1 Million.

== Medal summary ==
Event	Gold	Silver	Bronze
Men's	Julius Brink and Jonas Reckermann (GER)	Alison Cerutti and Harley Marques Silva (BRA)	Todd Rogers and Phil Dalhausser (USA)
Women's	April Ross and Jennifer Kessy (USA)	Larissa França and Juliana Felisberta (BRA)	Talita Antunes and Maria Antonelli (BRA)

== Medal table ==
Rank	Nation	Gold	Silver	Bronze	Total
1	United States	1	0	1	2
2	Germany	1	0	0	1
3	Brazil	0	2	1	3
Totals (3 entries)		2	2	2	6
