= Judith-Flores Yalovaya =

Russian volleyball player (born 1987)

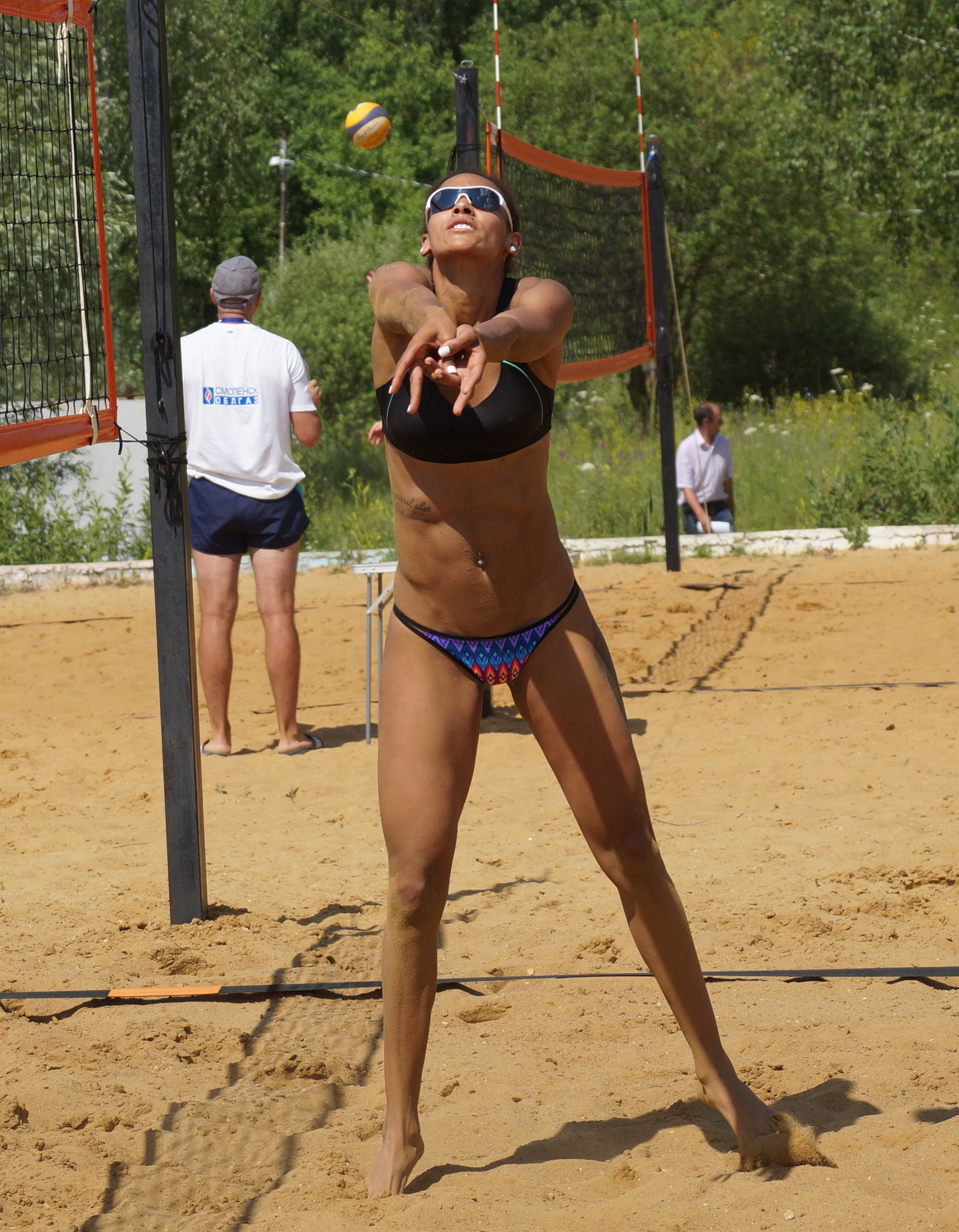
- Yalovaya in 2016

Personal information
- Born: June 9, 1987 (age 39); Ryazan, RSFSR, Soviet Union
- Height: 187 cm (6 ft 2 in)
Honours
Women's beach volleyball
Representing Russia
Bronze medal – third place	2010 Vityazevo	Beach

Judith-Flores Manuelevna Yalovaya (Russian: Жудитт-Флорес Мануэ́левна Ялова́я, nee Pisnyuk (Russian: Писню́к); born June 9, 1987, Ryazan, RSFSR, USSR) is a Russian volleyball player. Bronze medalist of Russian Beach Volleyball Championship, silver medalist of Open Cup of Russia (2010, with Natalia Stepanova).

== Biography ==
Judith-Flores was born on June 9, 1987, in Ryazan. She studied at the Ryazan school number 65. Friends call her Zhu.

Her father is an Angolan, a paratrooper who studied at Ryazan Higher Airborne Command School. When the girl was one month old, he was drafted into the Angolan army due to the outbreak of hostilities in Angola. He died in 2009. Her mother is Russian, Elena Pisnyuk.

In the third grade enrolled in the volleyball section. Immediately fell in love with volleyball, never played other sports. As a rule, she played for older teams.

In 2004, at the age of seventeen, she was invited to the Tula club Tulitsa, which, with her participation, went to the super league in one season. Having played one season in the elite, she spent a year on loan at the volleyball club Hara Morin (Ulan-Ude).

For a long time, she combined the game in classic volleyball with beach volleyball, treating the latter as a hobby. Realizing at some point that she could not make a career in classic volleyball, she passed as a beach volleyball player.

In 2010 she moved to Obninsk.

In beach volleyball, she played in a pair with Galina Boyko, Anna Tishchenko, Olga Vyazovik, Natalia Stepanova, Ekaterina Birlova, Yana Kiselyova, Anastasia Vasina, Alexandra Shiryayeva.

In November 2015, she returned to classic volleyball in the League B as part of the volleyball club in Ryazan.
