= Stéphane Canet =

French beach volleyball player (born 1971)

Personal information
- Nickname: "Mac Can"
- Nationality: France
- Born: 7 June 1971 (age 55); Hyères, France
- Height: 1.92 m (6 ft 3 1/2 in)
- Weight: 85 kg (187 lb)

Beach volleyball information
Years	Teammate
1996–1997; 1997–2007; 2007–2008	Ivan Douenel; Mathieu Hamel; Grégory Brachard

Stéphane Canet (born 7 June 1971 in Hyères) is a French beach volleyball player. He represented his nation France at the 2004 Summer Olympics along with his partner Mathieu Hamel.

Canet began his sporting career at the FIVB World Tour in 1996, and went on to compete with his longtime partner Mathieu Hamel by the following year. The French tandem also qualified for the men's beach volleyball at the 2004 Summer Olympics in Athens by obtaining their berth from the final stage of the FIVB Grand Slam Series in Berlin. They lost all three matches in the group stage and did not advance to the medal round.
