= Mathieu Hamel =

French beach volleyball player (born 1972)

Personal information
- Nationality: France
- Born: August 28, 1972 (age 54); Caen, France
- Height: 1.90 m (6 ft 3 in)
- Weight: 82 kg (181 lb)

Beach volleyball information
Years	Teammate
1996–1997; 1997–2007	Philippe Maz; Stéphane Canet

Mathieu Hamel (born August 28, 1972, in Caen) is a French beach volleyball player. He represented his nation France at the 2004 Summer Olympics along with his partner Stéphane Canet.

Hamel began his sporting career at the FIVB World Tour in 1996 and went on to compete with his longtime partner Stéphane Canet by the following year. The French tandem also qualified for the men's beach volleyball at the 2004 Summer Olympics in Athens by obtaining their berth from the final stage of the FIVB Grand Slam Series in Berlin. They lost all three matches in the group stage and did not advance to the medal round.
