= Frans Ronnes =

Dutch politician (1948–2017)

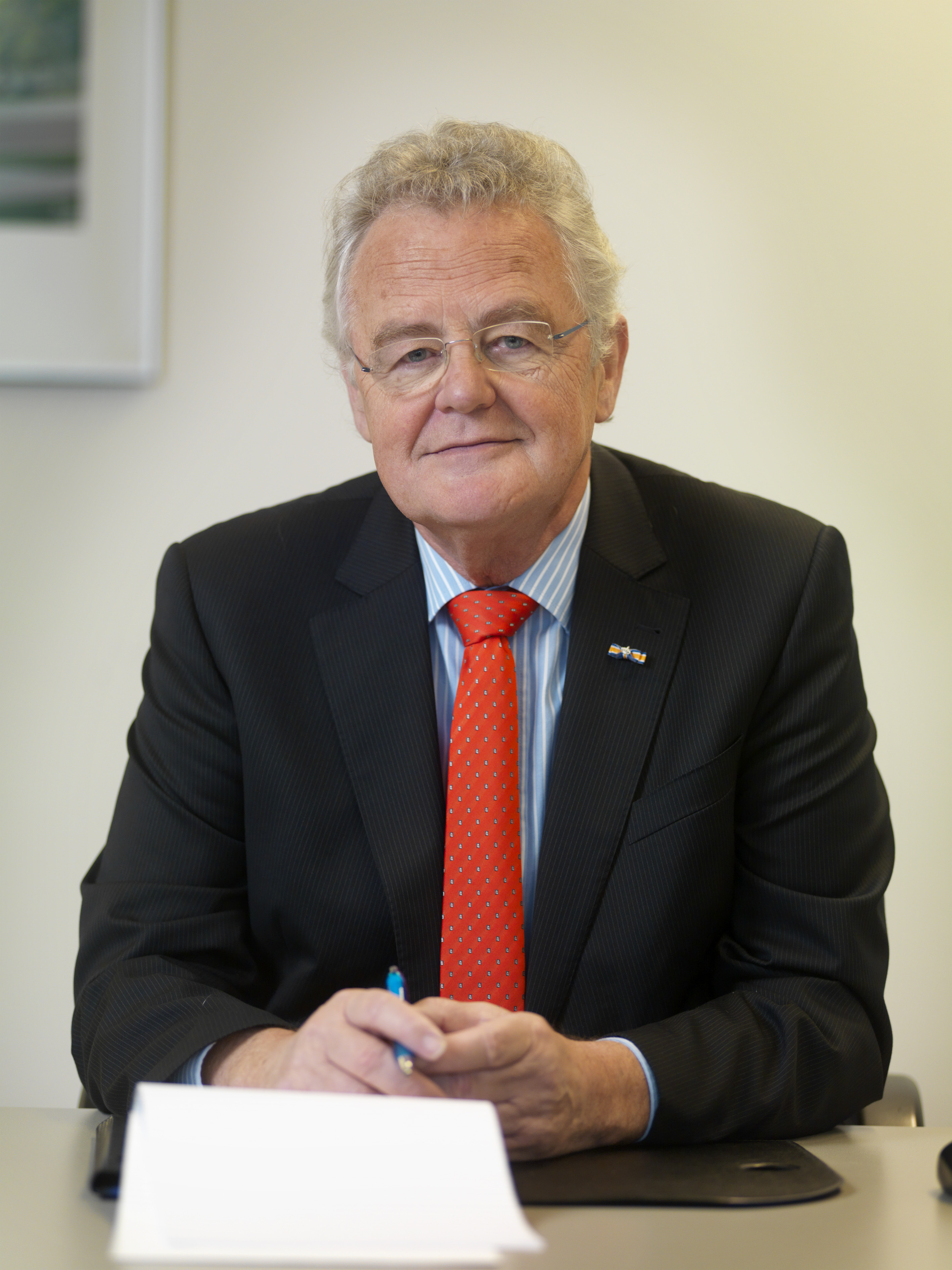
Frans Ronnes

F.H.G.M. (Frans) Ronnes (16 October 1948 – 12 June 2017) was a Dutch politician. He was a member of the Christian Democratic Appeal (Christen-Democratisch Appèl). From 2001 to 2013 he was mayor of the municipality of Haaren.

Ronnes was born 16 October 1948 in the village of Vierlingsbeek, North Brabant. From 1998 to 2001 he was an alderman of the municipality of Bernheze. Both municipalities are situated in the province of North Brabant. In October 2014, he assumed the post of interim mayor of Laarbeek after Hans Obachs left office, which he held until his cancer diagnosis in 2016. He was the president of the Charter of European Rural Communities. Ronnes died on 12 June 2017 after a battle with prostate cancer.

His sons Gijs (born 1977) and Bram (born 1978) are beach volleyball players.
