= Alexandra Shiryayeva =

Russian beach volleyball player (born 1983)

Personal information
- Full name: Alexandra Alexandrovna Shiryayeva
- Born: February 9, 1983 (age 43) Leningrad, Russia
- Height: 6 ft 2 in (1.88 m)
- Weight: 165 lb (75 kg)
Medal record
Women's volleyball
Representing Russia
European Championships
Gold medal – first place	2006 The Hague	Beach

Alexandra Alexandrovna Shiryayeva (Russian: Александра Александровна Ширяева; born February 9, 1983) is a 6 ft 2 in (1.88 m), 165 lb (75 kg), female beach volleyball player from Russia. She claimed the gold medal at the 2006 European Championships in The Hague, Netherlands, partnering with Natalya Uryadova.

At the 2008 Summer Olympics, she and her partner Natalya Uryadova were defeated in an historical game against Georgia while war was raging between the two countries. In an AP article by Jimmy Golan published on August 13, 2008, Alexandra Shiryayeva showed courage and grace in defeat by declaring “We just want to end the conflict, all the history between us was friendly.”

== Playing partners ==
- Maria Bratkova
- Judith-Flores Yalovaya
- Anna Morozova
- Natalya Uryadova
- Anastasia Vasina
