= Volleyball World Beach Pro Tour =

Professional beach volleyball tour

Beach Volleyball World Tour
- Full name: FIVB Beach Volleyball World Tour
- Region: World
- Date span: February–September (2021)
- Tournaments: (Men & Women) (Men) (Women)
- Type: Beach volleyball

History
- First tour: 1989
- Last tour: 2021
- Final edition: 33rd (2021)

Most World Tour titles
- Men (team): (Brazil) Emanuel – Ricardo (5 World Tour titles); 2002–2009
- Women (team): (Brazil) Larissa – Juliana (7 World Tour titles); 2004–2012
- Men (individual): (Brazil) Emanuel Rego (10 World Tour titles); 1996–2012
- Women (individual): (Brazil) Larissa França (Brazil) Juliana Silva (8 World Tour titles each); 2004–2017

Final World Tour champions
- Men: (Norway) Anders Mol – Christian Sørum (2024)
- Women: (United States) Kristen Nuss – Taryn Kloth (2024)

Most tournament titles
- Men (team): (Brazil) Emanuel – Ricardo (34 titles); 2002–2009
- Women (team): (Brazil) Larissa – Juliana (45 titles); 2004–2012
- Men (individual): (Brazil) Emanuel Rego (77 titles); 1996–2012
- Women (individual): (Brazil) Larissa França (62 titles); 2005–2017

The Volleyball World Beach Pro Tour is the worldwide professional beach volleyball tour for both men and women, organized by the Fédération Internationale de Volleyball (FIVB) and Volleyball World. It was established in 2022 as the successor to the FIVB Beach Volleyball World Tour, which had been held since 1989 for men and since 1992 for women.

The tour consists of tournaments held throughout the year at different levels, including the Elite16, Challenge and Futures events, as well as the Beach Pro Tour Finals.

The previous FIVB Beach Volleyball World Tour was known between 2003 and 2012 as the FIVB Beach Volleyball Swatch World Tour for sponsorship reasons.

== History ==
The international professional tour was originally known as the FIVB Beach Volleyball World Series, and began in 1989 for men and 1992 for women. It was rebranded as the FIVB Beach Volleyball World Tour in 1997. The World Tour was previously accompanied by FIVB Challenger and Satellite events, which served as a developmental circuit for up-and-coming players. The FIVB handed over the organizing of Challenger and Satellite events to the continental confederations in 2009.

Tournaments in the World Tour were previously categorized as either Grand Slams, Majors or Opens. This was replaced by the star rating structure in 2017.

In October 2021, FIVB announced a rebranding of the series as the Volleyball World Beach Pro Tour, starting with the 2022 edition.

== Tournament categories ==
The star ranking tournament structure was introduced in 2017. World Tour tournaments were ranked from 1 to 5 stars, with 5-star tournaments offering the most prize money. The 2018 World Tour had 47 international tournaments with a total prize purse of over US$7 million. Competing in the World Tour as well as other FIVB-recognized tournaments such as the Summer Olympics allowed players to earn FIVB Ranking Points, with higher-star events being worth more points. The World Tour concluded with the World Tour Finals at the end of each season. A new tournament classification was introduced in 2022.

Tournaments		1989–1996	1997–2014	2015−2016	2017−2021	2022−present
Tiers	0	—	—	World Tour Finals		
Tiers	I	Opens	Grand Slams	Grand Slams/Major Series	5-star/Major Series	Elite 16
Tiers	II	—	Opens		4-star tournaments	Challengers
Tiers	III	—	Challengers		3-star tournaments	Futures
Tiers	IV	—	Satellites		2-star tournaments	—
Tiers	V	—	—		1-star tournaments	—

Prize money (2023 season)
Event category	Prize money (per gender)
World Tour Finals	US$800,000
World Championships	US$500,000
Elite 16	US$150,000
Challenger	US$75,000
Futures	US$5,000

== Champions ==
Year	Men's champions	Women's champions
1989	(United States) Sinjin Smith (1) / Randy Stoklos (1)	
1990	(United States) Sinjin Smith (2) / Randy Stoklos (2)	
1991	(United States) Sinjin Smith (3) / Randy Stoklos (3)	
1992	(United States) Sinjin Smith (4) / Randy Stoklos (4)	(United States) Karolyn Kirby (1) / Nancy Reno
1993	(Brazil) Roberto Lopes (1) / Franco Neto (1)	(United States) Karolyn Kirby (2) / Liz Masakayan
1994	(Norway) Jan Kvalheim / Bjørn Maaseide	(Brazil) Mônica Rodrigues / Adriana Samuel
1995	(Brazil) Roberto Lopes (2) / Franco Neto (2)	(Brazil) Sandra Pires (1) / Jackie Silva (1)
1996	(Brazil) Zé Marco de Melo (1) / Emanuel Rego (1)	(Brazil) Sandra Pires (2) / Jackie Silva (2)
1997	(Brazil) Zé Marco de Melo (2) / Emanuel Rego (2)	(Brazil) Adriana Behar (1) / Shelda Bede (1)
1998	(Brazil) Rogério Ferreira / Guilherme Marques	(Brazil) Adriana Behar (2) / Shelda Bede (2)
1999	(Brazil) José Loiola / Emanuel Rego (3)	(Brazil) Adriana Behar (3) / Shelda Bede (3)
2000	(Brazil) Zé Marco de Melo (3) / Ricardo Santos (1)	(Brazil) Adriana Behar (4) / Shelda Bede (4)
2001	(Brazil) Tande Ramos / Emanuel Rego (4)	(Brazil) Adriana Behar (5) / Shelda Bede (5)
2002	(Argentina) Mariano Baracetti / Martín Conde	(United States) Misty May / Kerri Walsh
2003	(Brazil) Emanuel Rego (5) / Ricardo Santos (2)	(Brazil) Ana Paula Connelly (1) / Sandra Pires (3)
2004	(Brazil) Emanuel Rego (6) / Ricardo Santos (3)	(Brazil) Adriana Behar (6) / Shelda Bede (6)
2005	(Brazil) Emanuel Rego (7) / Ricardo Santos (4)	(Brazil) Larissa França (1) / Juliana Silva (1)
2006	(Brazil) Emanuel Rego (8) / Ricardo Santos (5)	(Brazil) Larissa França (2) / Juliana Silva (2)
2007	(Brazil) Emanuel Rego (9) / Ricardo Santos (6)	(Brazil) Larissa França (3) / Juliana Silva (3)
2008	(Brazil) Harley Marques / Pedro Solberg Salgado	(Brazil) Shelda Bede (7) / Ana Paula Connelly (2)
2009	(Germany) Julius Brink / Jonas Reckermann	(Brazil) Larissa França (4) / Juliana Silva (4)
2010	(United States) Phil Dalhausser / Todd Rogers	(Brazil) Larissa França (5) / Juliana Silva (5)
2011	(Brazil) Alison Cerutti (1) / Emanuel Rego (10)	(Brazil) Larissa França (6) / Juliana Silva (6)
2012	(United States) Jake Gibb / Sean Rosenthal	(Brazil) Larissa França (7) / Juliana Silva (7)
2013	(Latvia) Aleksandrs Samoilovs (1) / Jānis Šmēdiņš (1)	(Brazil) Talita Antunes (1) / Taiana Lima
2014	(Latvia) Aleksandrs Samoilovs (2) / Jānis Šmēdiņš (2)	(Brazil) Maria Elisa Antonelli / Juliana Silva (7)
2015	(Brazil) Alison Cerutti (2) / Bruno Oscar Schmidt	(Brazil) Ágatha Bednarczuk (1) / Bárbara Seixas
2016	(Latvia) Aleksandrs Samoilovs (3) / Jānis Šmēdiņš (3)	(Germany) Laura Ludwig / Kira Walkenhorst
2017	(Brazil) Evandro Oliveira / André Stein	(Brazil) Talita Antunes (2) / Larissa França (7)
2018	(Norway) Anders Mol (1) / Christian Sørum (1)	(Brazil) Ágatha Bednarczuk (2) / Eduarda Lisboa
2019	(Norway) Anders Mol (2) / Christian Sørum (2)	(Canada) Melissa Humana-Paredes / Sarah Pavan
2020	No official champions due to several events being postponed or canceled amidst the COVID-19 pandemic.	
2021	(Qatar) Cherif Samba (1) / Ahmed Tijan (1)	(Brazil) Ágatha Bednarczuk (3) / Eduarda Lisboa (2)
2022	(Norway) Anders Mol (3) / Christian Sørum (3)	(United States) Sara Hughes / Kelly Cheng
2023	(Sweden) David Åhman / Jonatan Hellvig	(United States) Kristen Nuss / Taryn Kloth
2024	(Norway) Anders Mol (4) / Christian Sørum (4)	(United States) Kristen Nuss (2) / Taryn Kloth (2)
2025	(Norway) Anders Mol (5) / Christian Sørum (5)	(Brazil) Carol Solberg (1) / Rebecca Cavalcante (1)
2026	(Sweden) Jacob Hölting Nilsson (1) / Elmer Andersson (1)	(Brazil) Carol Solberg (2) / Rebecca Cavalcante (2)

== FIVB World Tour Finals ==
The Tour Finals were the season-ending championships of the FIVB World Tour and featured only the top performing teams during the regular season. The tournament was first held in 2015.

=== Men's results ===
Tournament	Champions	Runners-up	Third place	Fourth place
2015 Swatch FIVB World Tour Finals; Fort Lauderdale, United States; 29 September – 4 October 2015	Alison Cerutti (BRA); Bruno Oscar Schmidt (BRA); 21–13, 21–15	Phil Dalhausser (USA); Nicholas Lucena (USA)	Evandro Oliveira (BRA); Pedro Solberg Salgado (BRA); 21–19, 21–14	Alexander Brouwer (NED); Robert Meeuwsen (NED)
2016 Swatch FIVB World Tour Finals; Toronto, Canada; 13–18 September 2016	Alison Cerutti (BRA); Bruno Oscar Schmidt (BRA); 21–19, 21–19	Evandro Oliveira (BRA); Pedro Solberg Salgado (BRA)	Tri Bourne (USA); John Hyden (USA); 21–14, 22–20	Ben Saxton (CAN); Chaim Schalk (CAN)
2017 Swatch FIVB World Tour Finals; Hamburg, Germany; US$400,000; 22–27 August 2017	Phil Dalhausser (USA); Nick Lucena (USA); 21–15, 21–13	Evandro Oliveira (BRA); André Stein (BRA)	Daniele Lupo (ITA); Paolo Nicolai (ITA); 21–17, 19–21, 15–12	Piotr Kantor (POL); Bartosz Łosiak (POL)
2018 FIVB World Tour Finals; Hamburg, Germany; US$400,000; 14–19 August 2018	Anders Mol (NOR); Christian Sørum (NOR); 21–19, 21–17	Michał Bryl (POL); Grzegorz Fijałek (POL)	Piotr Kantor (POL); Bartosz Łosiak (POL); 19–21, 21–15, 15–13	Julius Thole (GER); Clemens Wickler (GER)
2019 FIVB World Tour Finals; Rome, Italy; US$300,000; 28 August – 8 September 2019	Viacheslav Krasilnikov (RUS); Oleg Stoyanovskiy (RUS); 21–16, 21–16	Julius Thole (GER); Clemens Wickler (GER)	Anders Mol (NOR); Christian Sørum (NOR); 21–16, 21–15	Taylor Crabb (USA); Jake Gibb (USA)
2021 FIVB World Tour Finals; Cagliari, Italy; US$300,000; 6—10 October 2021	Anders Mol (NOR); Christian Sørum (NOR); 22–20, 23–21	Ondřej Perušič (CZE); David Schweiner (CZE)	Steven van de Velde (NED); Christiaan Varenhorst (NED); 23–21, 21–17	Paolo Nicolai (ITA); Daniele Lupo (ITA)
2022 FIVB World Tour Finals; Doha, Qatar; US$800,000; 26–29 January 2023	Anders Mol (NOR); Christian Sørum (NOR); 21–18, 21–18	Michał Bryl (POL); Bartosz Łosiak (POL)	Paolo Nicolai (ITA); Samuele Cottafava (ITA); 22–20, 19–21, 16–14	Alexander Brouwer (NED); Robert Meeuwsen (NED)
2023 FIVB World Tour Finals; Doha, Qatar; US$800,000; 6–9 December 2023	David Åhman (SWE); Jonatan Hellvig (SWE); 21–16, 21–17	Anders Mol (NOR); Christian Sørum (NOR)	George Wanderley (BRA); André Stein (BRA); 21–17, 21–17	Cherif Younousse (QAT); Ahmed Tijan (QAT)
2024 FIVB World Tour Finals; Doha, Qatar; US$800,000; 4–7 December 2024	Anders Mol (NOR); Christian Sørum (NOR); 21–18, 22–20	David Åhman (SWE); Jonatan Hellvig (SWE)	Cherif Younousse (QAT); Ahmed Tijan (QAT); 18–21, 21–15, 17–15	Stefan Boermans (NED); Yorick de Groot (NED)

=== Women's results ===
Tournament	Champions	Runners-up	Third place	Fourth place
2015 Swatch FIVB World Tour Finals; Fort Lauderdale, United States; 29 September – 4 October 2015	Talita Antunes (BRA); Larissa França (BRA); 21–17, 21–18	Laura Ludwig (GER); Kira Walkenhorst (GER)	Ágatha Bednarczuk (BRA); Bárbara Seixas (BRA); 22–20, 14–21, 15–10	Heather Bansley (CAN); Sarah Pavan (CAN)
2016 Swatch FIVB World Tour Finals; Toronto, Canada; 13–18 September 2016	Laura Ludwig (GER); Kira Walkenhorst (GER); 21–18, 21–16	Joana Heidrich (SUI); Nadine Zumkehr (SUI)	Isabelle Forrer (SUI); Anouk Vergé-Dépré (SUI); 21–19, 21–18	Talita Antunes (BRA); Larissa França (BRA)
2017 Swatch FIVB World Tour Finals; Hamburg, Germany; US$400,000; 22–27 August 2017	Laura Ludwig (GER); Kira Walkenhorst (GER); 21–17, 19–21, 15–10	Ágatha Bednarczuk (BRA); Eduarda Lisboa (BRA)	Talita Antunes (BRA); Larissa França (BRA); 21–17, 21–19	Melissa Humana-Paredes (CAN); Sarah Pavan (CAN)
2018 FIVB World Tour Finals; Hamburg, Germany; US$400,000; 14–19 August 2018	Ágatha Bednarczuk (BRA); Eduarda Lisboa (BRA); 21–15, 21–19	Barbora Hermannová (CZE); Markéta Sluková (CZE)	Mariafe Artacho del Solar (AUS); Taliqua Clancy (AUS); 21–15, 19–21, 15–8	Maria Elisa Antonelli (BRA); Carolina Solberg Salgado (BRA)
2019 FIVB World Tour Finals; Rome, Italy; US$300,000; 28 August – 8 September 2019	Margareta Kozuch (GER); Laura Ludwig (GER); 21–19, 21–17	Ágatha Bednarczuk (BRA); Eduarda Lisboa (BRA)	Rebecca Cavalcante (BRA); Ana Patrícia Ramos (BRA); 19–21, 21–18, 16–14	Joana Heidrich (SUI); Anouk Vergé-Dépré (SUI)
2021 FIVB World Tour Finals; Cagliari, Italy; US$300,000; 6—10 October 2021	Julia Sude (GER); Karla Borger (GER); 21–13, 23–21	Sarah Pavan (CAN); Melissa Humana-Paredes (CAN)	April Ross (USA); Alix Klineman (USA); 21–8, 21–17	Nadezda Makroguzova (RUS); Svetlana Kholomina (RUS)
2022 FIVB World Tour Finals; Doha, Qatar; US$800,000; 26–29 January 2023	Sara Hughes (USA); Kelly Cheng (USA); 21–18, 21–16	Eduarda Santos Lisboa (BRA); Ana Patrícia Ramos (BRA)	Katja Stam (NED); Raïsa Schoon (NED); 21–18, 21–10	Taliqua Clancy (AUS); Mariafe Artacho del Solar (AUS)
2023 FIVB World Tour Finals; Doha, Qatar; US$800,000; 6–9 December 2023	Kristen Nuss (USA); Taryn Kloth (USA); 21–17, 21–14	Svenja Müller (GER); Cinja Tillmann (GER)	Ana Patrícia Ramos (BRA); Eduarda Santos Lisboa (BRA); 21–13, 18–21, 15–12	Mariafe Artacho del Solar (AUS); Taliqua Clancy (AUS)
2024 FIVB World Tour Finals; Doha, Qatar; US$800,000; 4–7 December 2024	Kristen Nuss (USA); Taryn Kloth (USA); 21–19, 21–17	Terese Cannon (USA); Megan Kraft (USA)	Tīna Graudiņa (LAT); Anastasija Samoilova (LAT); 24–22, 21–16	Xue Chen (CHN); Xia Xinyi (CHN)

== Award winners ==
=== Men's FIVB World Tour award winners ===
Year	Best Blocker
2005	(Brazil) Fábio Luiz Magalhães
2006	(United States) Phil Dalhausser (1)
2007	(United States) Phil Dalhausser (2)
2008	(United States) Phil Dalhausser (3)
2009	(Germany) Jonas Reckermann
2010	(United States) Phil Dalhausser (4)
2011	(Brazil) Alison Cerutti (1)
2012	(United States) Phil Dalhausser (5)
2013	(Brazil) Pedro Solberg Salgado
2014	(United States) Phil Dalhausser (6)
2015	(Brazil) Alison Cerutti (2)
2016	(Italy) Paolo Nicolai
2017	(United States) Phil Dalhausser (7)
2018	(Norway) Anders Mol (1)
2019	(Norway) Anders Mol (2)
2020	not awarded
2021	not awarded

Year	Best Defensive Player
2005	(Brazil) Márcio Araújo
2006	(Argentina) Martín Conde / (United States) Todd Rogers (1)
2007	(United States) Todd Rogers (2)
2008	(United States) Todd Rogers (3)
2009	(Netherlands) Reinder Nummerdor (1)
2010	(United States) Todd Rogers (4)
2011	(Netherlands) Reinder Nummerdor (2)
2012	(Latvia) Mārtiņš Pļaviņš
2013	(Brazil) Bruno Oscar Schmidt (1)
2014	(Brazil) Bruno Oscar Schmidt (2)
2015	(Brazil) Bruno Oscar Schmidt (3)
2016	(Brazil) Bruno Oscar Schmidt (4)
2017	(Russia) Viacheslav Krasilnikov
2018	(Norway) Christian Sørum (1)
2019	(Norway) Christian Sørum (2)
2020	not awarded
2021	not awarded

Year	Best Hitter
2005	(Brazil) Ricardo Santos
2006	(Brazil) Emanuel Rego
2007	(United States) Phil Dalhausser (1)
2008	(United States) Phil Dalhausser (2)
2009	(United States) Phil Dalhausser (3)
2010	(United States) Phil Dalhausser (4)
2011	(Brazil) Alison Cerutti (1)
2012	(Brazil) Alison Cerutti (2)
2013	(Latvia) Jānis Šmēdiņš (1)
2014	(Latvia) Jānis Šmēdiņš (2)
2015	(Netherlands) Christiaan Varenhorst
2016	(Brazil) Alison Cerutti (3)
2017	(Netherlands) Alexander Brouwer (1)
2018	(Netherlands) Alexander Brouwer (2)
2019	discontinued

Year	Best Offensive Player
2005	(Brazil) Ricardo Santos (1)
2006	(Brazil) Ricardo Santos (2)
2007	(Brazil) Ricardo Santos (3)
2008	(United States) Phil Dalhausser (1)
2009	(United States) Phil Dalhausser (2)
2010	(United States) Phil Dalhausser (3)
2011	(Brazil) Alison Cerutti
2012	(United States) Phil Dalhausser (4)
2013	(Latvia) Jānis Šmēdiņš (1)
2014	(Italy) Paolo Nicolai
2015	(Brazil) Bruno Oscar Schmidt
2016	(Latvia) Jānis Šmēdiņš (2)
2017	(United States) Phil Dalhausser (5)
2018	(Norway) Anders Mol (1)
2019	(Norway) Anders Mol (2)
2020	not awarded
2021	not awarded

Year	Best Server
2005	(Canada) Conrad Leinemann
2006	(Norway) Iver Horrem
2007	(Russia) Igor Kolodinsky (1)
2008	(Russia) Igor Kolodinsky (2)
2009	(Russia) Igor Kolodinsky (3)
2010	(Russia) Igor Kolodinsky (4)
2011	(Germany) Eric Koreng (1)
2012	(Germany) Eric Koreng (2)
2013	not awarded
2014	(United States) Phil Dalhausser
2015	(Brazil) Evandro Oliveira (1)
2016	(Brazil) Evandro Oliveira (2)
2017	(Brazil) Evandro Oliveira (3)
2018	(Brazil) Evandro Oliveira (4)
2019	(Brazil) Evandro Oliveira (5)
2020	not awarded
2021	not awarded

Year	Best Setter
2005	(United States) Todd Rogers
2006	(Brazil) Márcio Araújo (1)
2007	(Brazil) Márcio Araújo (2)
2008	(Brazil) Márcio Araújo (3)
2009	(United States) Phil Dalhausser (1)
2010	(United States) Phil Dalhausser (2)
2011	(United States) Phil Dalhausser (3)
2012	(United States) Phil Dalhausser (4)
2013	(Latvia) Jānis Šmēdiņš (1)
2014	(United States) Phil Dalhausser (5)
2015	(United States) Phil Dalhausser (6)
2016	(United States) Phil Dalhausser (7)
2017	(Poland) Bartosz Łosiak
2018	(Latvia) Jānis Šmēdiņš (2)
2019	(Norway) Anders Mol
2020	not awarded
2021	not awarded

Year	Most Improved Player
2005	(Brazil) Fábio Luiz Magalhães
2006	(United States) Phil Dalhausser
2007	(Russia) Dmitri Barsuk / (China) Xu Linyin
2008	(France) Andy Cès
2009	(Brazil) Alison Cerutti
2010	(Brazil) Bruno Oscar Schmidt
2011	(Poland) Mariusz Prudel
2012	(Italy) Paolo Nicolai
2013	(Brazil) Álvaro Morais Filho
2014	(United States) Ryan Doherty
2015	(Mexico) Lombardo Ontiveros
2016	(Poland) Piotr Kantor
2017	(Canada) Sam Pedlow
2018	(Norway) Anders Mol
2019	discontinued

Year	Most Inspirational
2005	(Canada) Mark Heese
2006	(Brazil) Franco Neto (1)
2007	(Brazil) Franco Neto (2)
2008	(United States) Todd Rogers
2009	(Brazil) Harley Marques
2010	(China) Xu Linyin
2011	(Brazil) Emanuel Rego (1)
2012	(Brazil) Emanuel Rego (2)
2013	(United States) Jake Gibb (1)
2014	(United States) Jake Gibb (2)
2015	(Brazil) Emanuel Rego (3)
2016	(Netherlands) Reinder Nummerdor
2017	(United States) John Hyden
2018	(Brazil) Ricardo Santos
2019	discontinued

Year	Most Outstanding Player
2005	(Brazil) Ricardo Santos (1)
2006	(Brazil) Emanuel Rego (1)
2007	(Brazil) Ricardo Santos (2)
2008	(Brazil) Harley Marques (1)
2009	(Brazil) Harley Marques (2) / (Netherlands) Richard Schuil
2010	(United States) Phil Dalhausser (1)
2011	(Brazil) Emanuel Rego (2)
2012	(United States) Sean Rosenthal
2013	(United States) Phil Dalhausser (2)
2014	(United States) Phil Dalhausser (3)
2015	(Brazil) Bruno Oscar Schmidt (1)
2016	(Brazil) Bruno Oscar Schmidt (2)
2017	(United States) Phil Dalhausser (4)
2018	(Norway) Anders Mol (1)
2019	(Norway) Anders Mol (2)
2020	not awarded
2021	not awarded

Year	Sportsperson of the Year
2005	(Brazil) Emanuel Rego (1)
2006	(Brazil) Franco Neto (1)
2007	(Brazil) Franco Neto (2)
2008	(United States) Phil Dalhausser
2009	(Estonia) Rivo Vesik
2010	(Brazil) Emanuel Rego (2)
2011	(Brazil) Emanuel Rego (3)
2012	(Brazil) Emanuel Rego (4)
2013	(Latvia) Jānis Šmēdiņš
2014	(Brazil) Emanuel Rego (5)
2015	(Brazil) Bruno Oscar Schmidt (1)
2016	(Brazil) Bruno Oscar Schmidt (2)
2017	(Brazil) Álvaro Morais Filho
2018	(Latvia) Aleksandrs Samoilovs / (Brazil) Ricardo Santos
2019	discontinued

Year	Team Of The Year
2005	(Brazil) Emanuel Rego / Ricardo Santos (1)
2006	(Brazil) Emanuel Rego / Ricardo Santos (2)
2007	(Brazil) Emanuel Rego / Ricardo Santos (3)
2008	(Brazil) Harley Marques / Pedro Solberg Salgado
2009	(Germany) Julius Brink / Jonas Reckermann
2010	(United States) Phil Dalhausser / Todd Rogers
2011	(Brazil) Alison Cerutti / Emanuel Rego
2012	(United States) Jake Gibb / Sean Rosenthal
2013	(Latvia) Aleksandrs Samoilovs / Jānis Šmēdiņš (1)
2014	(Latvia) Aleksandrs Samoilovs / Jānis Šmēdiņš (2)
2015	(Brazil) Alison Cerutti / Bruno Oscar Schmidt
2016	(Latvia) Aleksandrs Samoilovs / Jānis Šmēdiņš (3)
2017	(Brazil) Evandro Oliveira / André Stein
2018	(Norway) Anders Mol / Christian Sørum (1)
2019	(Norway) Anders Mol / Christian Sørum (2)
2020	not awarded
2021	not awarded

Year	Top Rookie
2005	(United States) Jake Gibb / (Italy) Matteo Varnier
2006	(United States) Sean Rosenthal
2007	(Russia) Igor Kolodinsky
2008	(Spain) Adrián Gavira
2009	(Latvia) Ruslans Sorokins
2010	(Estonia) Karl Jaani
2011	(Switzerland) Sébastien Chevallier
2012	(Netherlands) Christiaan Varenhorst
2013	(Brazil) Álvaro Morais Filho
2014	(United States) Tri Bourne
2015	(Italy) Adrian Carambula
2016	(Brazil) Gustavo Carvalhaes
2017	(Norway) Anders Mol
2018	(Russia) Igor Velichko
2019	discontinued

Year	Most Entertaining Player
2019	(Italy) Adrian Carambula
2020	not awarded
2021	not awarded

Year	Most Improved Team
2019	(Germany) Julius Thole / Clemens Wickler
2020	not awarded
2021	not awarded

=== Women's FIVB World Tour award winners ===
Year	Best Blocker
2005	(United States) Kerri Walsh Jennings (1)
2006	(United States) Kerri Walsh Jennings (2)
2007	(United States) Kerri Walsh Jennings (3)
2008	(United States) Kerri Walsh Jennings (4)
2009	(Brazil) Juliana Silva (1)
2010	(Brazil) Juliana Silva (2)
2011	(United States) Kerri Walsh Jennings (5)
2012	(United States) Kerri Walsh Jennings (6)
2013	(Brazil) Talita Antunes
2014	(United States) Kerri Walsh Jennings (7)
2015	(Canada) Sarah Pavan (1)
2016	(Germany) Kira Walkenhorst
2017	(Canada) Sarah Pavan (2)
2018	(Canada) Brandie Wilkerson
2019	(Canada) Sarah Pavan (3)
2020	not awarded
2021	not awarded

Year	Best Defensive Player
2005	(Brazil) Shelda Bede (1)
2006	(Brazil) Shelda Bede (2)
2007	(United States) Misty May-Treanor (1)
2008	(United States) Misty May-Treanor (2)
2009	(Brazil) Larissa França (1)
2010	(China) Zhang Xi
2011	(United States) Misty May-Treanor (3)
2012	(Brazil) Larissa França (2)
2013	(Germany) Laura Ludwig (1)
2014	(Brazil) Larissa França (3)
2015	(Canada) Heather Bansley (1)
2016	(Canada) Heather Bansley (2)
2017	(Germany) Laura Ludwig (2)
2018	(Canada) Heather Bansley (3)
2019	(Canada) Melissa Humana-Paredes
2020	not awarded
2021	not awarded

Year	Best Hitter
2005	(United States) Kerri Walsh Jennings (1)
2006	(United States) Kerri Walsh Jennings (2)
2007	(United States) Kerri Walsh Jennings (3)
2008	(Brazil) Larissa França (1)
2009	(United States) April Ross (1)
2010	(Brazil) Larissa França (2)
2011	(United States) April Ross (2)
2012	(United States) Kerri Walsh Jennings (4)
2013	(Brazil) Talita Antunes (1)
2014	(Brazil) Talita Antunes (2)
2015	(Brazil) Talita Antunes (3)
2016	(United States) Kerri Walsh Jennings (5)
2017	(Germany) Kira Walkenhorst
2018	(Brazil) Eduarda Lisboa
2019	discontinued

Year	Best Offensive Player
2005	(United States) Misty May-Treanor (1)
2006	(Brazil) Juliana Silva (1)
2007	(United States) Misty May-Treanor (2) / (United States) Kerri Walsh Jennings (1)
2008	(United States) Misty May-Treanor (3)
2009	(United States) April Ross
2010	(Brazil) Juliana Silva (2)
2011	(Germany) Laura Ludwig
2012	(Brazil) Juliana Silva (3)
2013	(Brazil) Talita Antunes
2014	(United States) Kerri Walsh Jennings (2)
2015	(Brazil) Larissa França(1)
2016	(Brazil) Larissa França(2)
2017	(Brazil) Larissa França(3)
2018	(Brazil) Eduarda Lisboa (1)
2019	(Brazil) Eduarda Lisboa (2)
2020	not awarded
2021	not awarded

Year	Best Server
2005	(Brazil) Ana Paula Connelly (1)
2006	(Brazil) Ana Paula Connelly (2)
2007	(Brazil) Ana Paula Connelly (3)
2008	(Brazil) Maria Clara Salgado (1)
2009	(Brazil) Maria Clara Salgado (2)
2010	(Netherlands) Marleen van Iersel
2011	(United States) April Ross (1)
2012	(United States) April Ross (2)
2013	not awarded
2014	(Germany) Karla Borger
2015	(United States) April Ross (3)
2016	(United States) April Ross (4)
2017	(United States) April Ross (5)
2018	(Australia) Taliqua Clancy
2019	(Brazil) Eduarda Lisboa
2020	not awarded
2021	not awarded

Year	Best Setter
2005	(United States) Misty May-Treanor
2006	(Brazil) Larissa França (1)
2007	(Brazil) Larissa França (2)
2008	(Brazil) Larissa França (3) / (Greece) Vasso Karantasiou
2009	(Brazil) Larissa França (4)
2010	(Brazil) Larissa França (5)
2011	(Brazil) Larissa França (6)
2012	(Brazil) Larissa França (7)
2013	(Germany) Ilka Semmler
2014	(Brazil) Larissa França (8)
2015	(Netherlands) Marleen van Iersel
2016	(Brazil) Larissa França (9)
2017	(Brazil) Larissa França (10)
2018	(Canada) Melissa Humana-Paredes (1)
2019	(Canada) Melissa Humana-Paredes (2)
2020	not awarded
2021	not awarded

Year	Most Improved Player
2005	(Greece) Vassiliki Arvaniti
2006	(Brazil) Leila Barros
2007	(Australia) Tamsin Barnett / (Germany) Laura Ludwig
2008	(United States) Nicole Branagh
2009	(Netherlands) Marleen van Iersel
2010	(Brazil) Taiana Lima
2011	(Italy) Marta Menegatti
2012	(Netherlands) Sophie van Gestel
2013	(Germany) Kira Walkenhorst
2014	(Switzerland) Tanja Hüberli
2015	(Vanuatu) Linline Matauatu
2016	(Switzerland) Joana Heidrich
2017	(Canada) Melissa Humana-Paredes
2018	(Australia) Mariafe Artacho del Solar
2019	discontinued

Year	Most Inspirational
2005	(Brazil) Shelda Bede (1)
2006	(Brazil) Shelda Bede (2)
2007	(Brazil) Shelda Bede (3)
2008	(Brazil) Shelda Bede (4)
2009	(Brazil) Shelda Bede (5)
2010	(United Kingdom) Denise Johns
2011	(United States) Kerri Walsh Jennings (1)
2012	(United States) Misty May-Treanor / (United States) Kerri Walsh Jennings (2)
2013	(Germany) Laura Ludwig (1)
2014	(United States) Kerri Walsh Jennings (3)
2015	(Vanuatu) Miller Pata (3)
2016	(Switzerland) Nadine Zumkehr
2017	(Germany) Laura Ludwig (2)
2018	(Brazil) Ágatha Bednarczuk
2019	discontinued

Year	Most Outstanding Player
2005	(United States) Misty May-Treanor (1)
2006	(Brazil) Larissa França (1)
2007	(United States) Kerri Walsh Jennings (1)
2008	(United States) Misty May-Treanor (2) / (China) Zhang Xi
2009	(Brazil) Juliana Silva (1)
2010	(Brazil) Juliana Silva (2)
2011	(Brazil) Juliana Silva (3)
2012	(United States) Kerri Walsh Jennings (2)
2013	(United States) Kerri Walsh Jennings (3)
2014	(United States) Kerri Walsh Jennings (4)
2015	(Brazil) Larissa França (2)
2016	(Germany) Laura Ludwig (1)
2017	(Germany) Laura Ludwig (2)
2018	(Brazil) Eduarda Lisboa (1)
2019	(Brazil) Eduarda Lisboa (2)
2020	not awarded
2021	not awarded

Year	Sportsperson of the Year
2005	(United States) Kerri Walsh Jennings (1)
2006	(United States) Kerri Walsh Jennings (2)
2007	(United States) Misty May-Treanor (1) / (United States) Kerri Walsh Jennings (3)
2008	(United States) Misty May-Treanor (2) / (United States) Kerri Walsh Jennings (4)
2009	(Brazil) Shelda Bede
2010	(United States) Misty May-Treanor (3)
2011	(Brazil) Juliana Silva (1)
2012	(United States) Kerri Walsh Jennings (5)
2013	(Brazil) Taiana Lima
2014	(Brazil) Juliana Silva (2)
2015	(Germany) Laura Ludwig (1)
2016	(Germany) Laura Ludwig (2)
2017	(Germany) Laura Ludwig (3)
2018	(Brazil) Ágatha Bednarczuk
2019	discontinued

Year	Team Of The Year
2005	(Brazil) Larissa França / Juliana Silva (1)
2006	(Brazil) Larissa França (2) / Juliana Silva (2)
2007	(Brazil) Larissa França (3) / Juliana Silva (3)
2008	(Brazil) Shelda Bede / Ana Paula Connelly
2009	(Brazil) Larissa França (4) / Juliana Silva (4)
2010	(Brazil) Larissa França (5) / Juliana Silva (5)
2011	(Brazil) Larissa França (6) / Juliana Silva (6)
2012	(Brazil) Larissa França (7) / Juliana Silva (7)
2013	(Brazil) Talita Antunes / Taiana Lima
2014	(Brazil) Maria Elisa Antonelli / Juliana Silva
2015	(Brazil) Talita Antunes / Larissa França
2016	(Germany) Laura Ludwig / Kira Walkenhorst
2017	(Brazil) Talita Antunes / Larissa França (2)
2018	(Brazil) Ágatha Bednarczuk / Eduarda Lisboa
2019	(Canada) Melissa Humana-Paredes / Sarah Pavan
2020	not awarded
2021	not awarded

Year	Top Rookie
2005	(Brazil) Talita Antunes
2006	(China) Xue Chen
2007	(United States) April Ross
2008	(Mexico) Bibiana Candelas
2009	(United States) Angie Akers / (Australia) Louise Bawden
2010	(Czech Republic) Kristýna Kolocová / (Czech Republic) Markéta Sluková
2011	(Germany) Britta Büthe
2012	(Brazil) Bárbara Seixas
2013	(Germany) Kira Walkenhorst
2014	(Canada) Melissa Humana-Paredes
2015	(Finland) Taru Lahti
2016	(Brazil) Eduarda Lisboa
2017	(United States) Sara Hughes
2018	(Latvia) Tīna Graudiņa / (Russia) Svetlana Kholomina
2019	discontinued

Year	Most Entertaining Player
2019	(Germany) Laura Ludwig
2020	not awarded
2021	not awarded

Year	Most Improved Team
2019	(Latvia) Tīna Graudiņa / Anastasija Kravčenoka
2020	not awarded
2021	not awarded
