= Liesbet Van Breedam =

Belgian beach volleyball player

Personal information
- Full name: Liesbet Van Breedam
- Born: 27 January 1979 (age 47)
- Hometown: Willebroek, Belgium
- Height: 5 ft 10 in (1.78 m)

Beach volleyball information

Current teammate
Teammate
Liesbeth Mouha
- Last updated: 13 August 2008

Liesbet Van Breedam-Simurina (born 27 January 1979) is a beach volleyball player from Belgium. She is partnered in the 2008 Summer Olympics with Liesbeth Mouha.
