= Susanne Glesnes =

Norwegian beach volleyball player (born 1974)

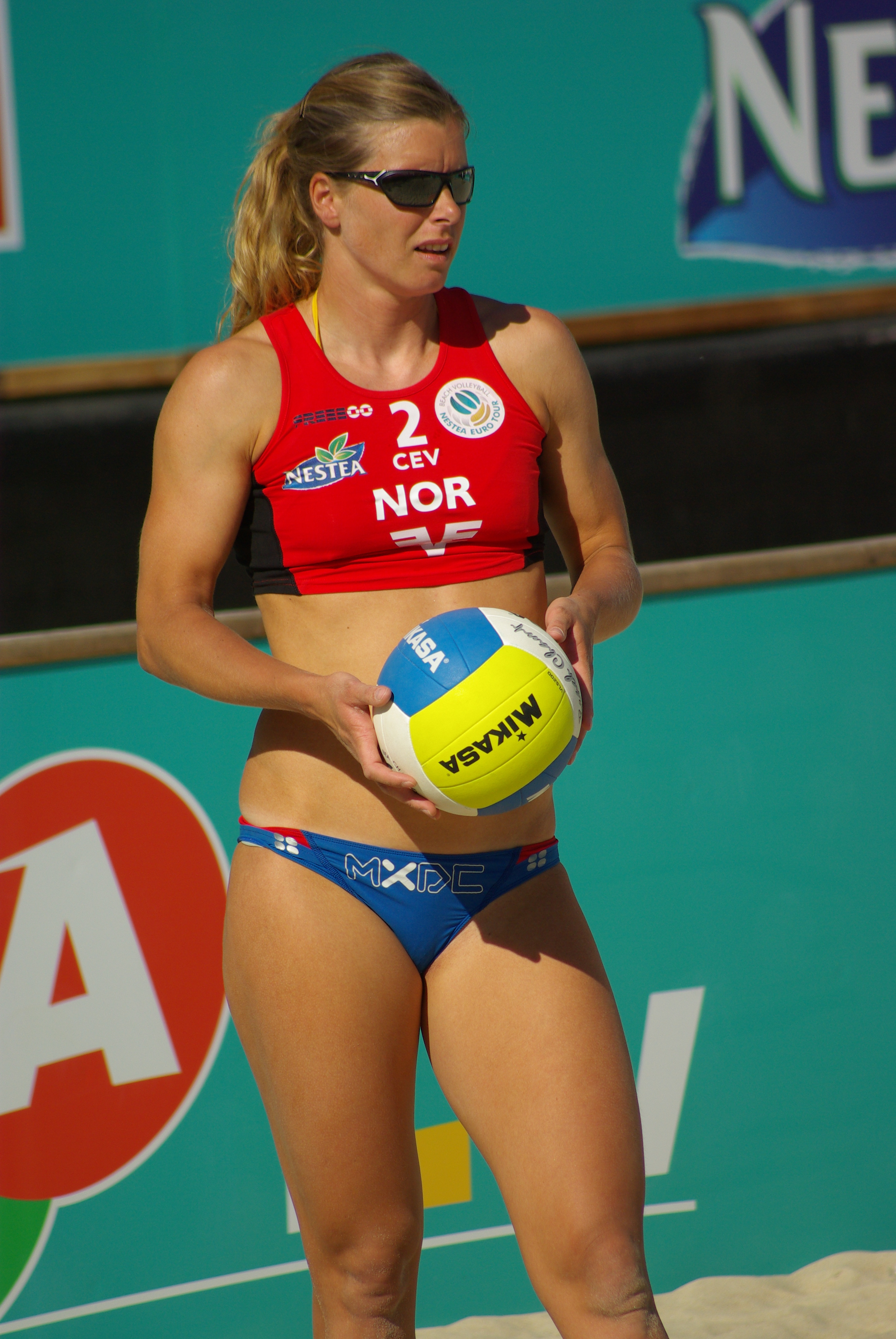
- Glesnes in 2008

Personal information
- Nationality: Norwegian
- Born: 1 December 1974 (age 51); Bergen, Norway
- Height: 5 ft 10 in (178 cm)
Honours
Women's beach volleyball
Representing Norway
European Championships
Silver medal – second place	2004 Timmendorfer Strand	Beach

Susanne Glesnes (born 1 December 1974 in Bergen) is a female professional beach volleyball player from Norway who represented her native country at the 2004 Summer Olympics in Athens, Greece. Partnering with Kathrine Maaseide, she claimed the silver medal at the 2004 European Championships in Timmendorfer Strand, Germany.
