= Jonas Reckermann =

German beach volleyball player

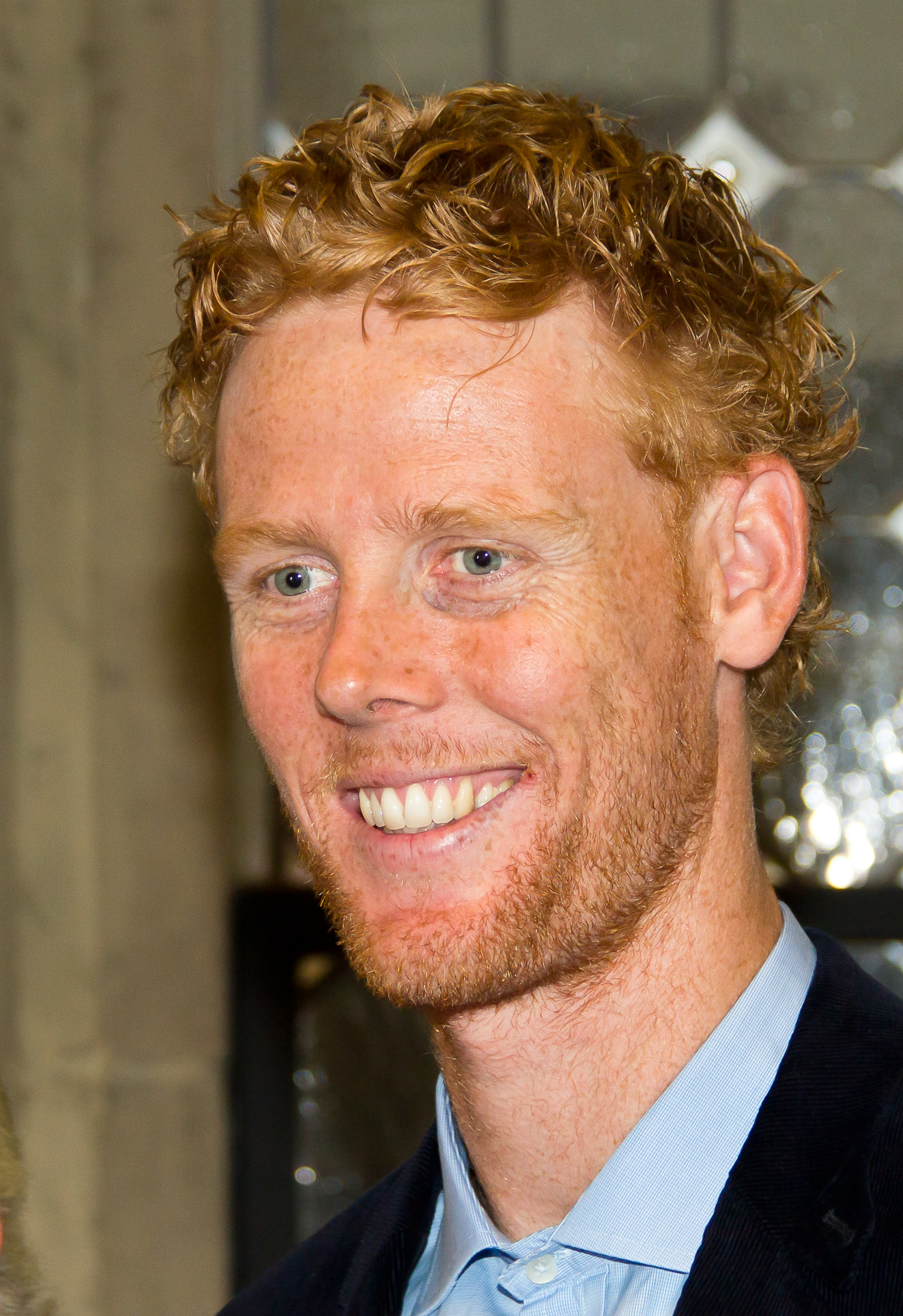
- Reckermann in 2012

Personal information
- Full name: Jonas Reckermann
- Nickname: Jonas Reckermann
- Nationality: German
- Born: May 26, 1979 (age 47); Rheine, West Germany
- Height: 6 ft 7 in (201 cm)
Honours
Men's beach volleyball
Representing Germany
Olympic Games
Gold medal – first place	2012 London	Beach
World Championships
Gold medal – first place	2009 Stavanger	Beach
Bronze medal – third place	2011 Rome	Beach
European Championships
Gold medal – first place	2002 Basel	Beach
Gold medal – first place	2004 Timmendorfer Strand	Beach
Silver medal – second place	2003 Alanya	Beach
Bronze medal – third place	2005 Moscow	Beach

Jonas Reckermann (born 26 May 1979) is a German retired beach volleyball player. Together with his most recent partner Julius Brink, he won the gold medal at the 2012 Summer Olympics in London, which, along with Laura Ludwig and Kira Walkenhorst are the most successful Olympic appearances of a German beach volleyball team. They were the first European duo to win the Olympic gold medal – male or female competition. In addition to that they also were the first European team ever to win a world championship title and are currently ranked 22nd on the FIVB World Tour (as of 23 July 2012).

== Early tournaments ==
Reckermann represented his native country at the 2004 Summer Olympics in Athens, where he finished in ninth place with his then partner Markus Dieckmann. He twice won the European Beach Volleyball Championships, in 2002 and 2004.

In 2009, he won four FIVB competitions (three consecutive Grand Slams) and the German Masters of the CEV European Championship Tour with partner Julius Brink. This includes the 2009 FIVB World Championship, held from 26 June to 5 July in Stavanger, where they beat top- seeded Harley – Alison in the final and former FIVB world champions and gold medalist of the 2008 Summer Olympics Rogers – Dalhausser in the semi-final.

== 2012 Olympics ==
Brink – Reckermann won the Olympic beach volleyball tournament in London in 2012. In the final, they beat the Brazilian team of Alison – Emanuel, making this the first victory of a European country at Beach Volleyball in Olympic history.

== Playing partners ==
- Julius Brink
- Markus Dieckmann
- Mischa Urbatzka
- Eric Koreng

== Retirement and media career ==
Reckermann announced his retirement from competition after the 2012 season due to injury.

He is currently the main pundit for Sky Germany's beach volleyball broadcasts.

Sporting positions
Preceded by Harley Marques and Pedro Solberg Salgado (BRA)	Men's FIVB Beach Volley World Tour Winner alongside (Germany) Julius Brink; 2009	Succeeded by Phil Dalhausser and Todd Rogers (USA)
Awards
Preceded by Phil Dalhausser (USA)	Men's FIVB World Tour "Best Blocker"; 2009	Succeeded by Phil Dalhausser (USA)
Preceded by Harley Marques and Pedro Solberg Salgado (BRA)	Men's FIVB World Tour "Team of the Year" alongside (Germany) Julius Brink; 2009	Succeeded by Phil Dalhausser and Todd Rogers (USA)
