= Markus Dieckmann =

German beach volleyball player (born 1976)

Personal information
- Born: 7 January 1976 (age 50); Bonn, West Germany
- Height: 6 ft 2 in (188 cm)
Honours
Men's beach volleyball
Representing Germany
European Championships
Gold medal – first place	2002 Basel	Beach
Gold medal – first place	2004 Timmendorfer Strand	Beach
Silver medal – second place	2003 Alanya	Beach
Bronze medal – third place	2005 Moscow	Beach

Markus Dieckmann (born 7 January 1976 in Bonn) is a retired professional beach volleyball player from Germany who represented his native country at the 2004 Summer Olympics in Athens, Greece. There he ended up in ninth place in the overall-rankings.

Partnering with Jonas Reckermann he twice won the gold medal at the European Beach Volleyball Championships, in 2002 and 2004. His twin brother, Christoph Dieckmann, also played as a professional beach volleyball player on the international tour.

== Playing partners ==
- Christoph Dieckmann
- Jonas Reckermann
- Julius Brink
- Erik Schmidt
- Drazan Slacanin
