= Liesbeth Mouha =

Belgian beach volleyball player (born 1983)

Personal information
- Full name: Liesbeth Mouha
- Born: 7 January 1983 (age 43)
- Hometown: Tongeren, Belgium
- Height: 6 ft 2 in (1.88 m)

Beach volleyball information

Current teammate
Teammate
Liesbet Van Breedam
- Last updated: 13 August 2008

Liesbeth Mouha (born 7 January 1983) is a beach volleyball player from Belgium. She was partnered in the 2008 Summer Olympics with Liesbet Van Breedam.
