= Nila Håkedal =

Norwegian beach volleyball player (born 1979)

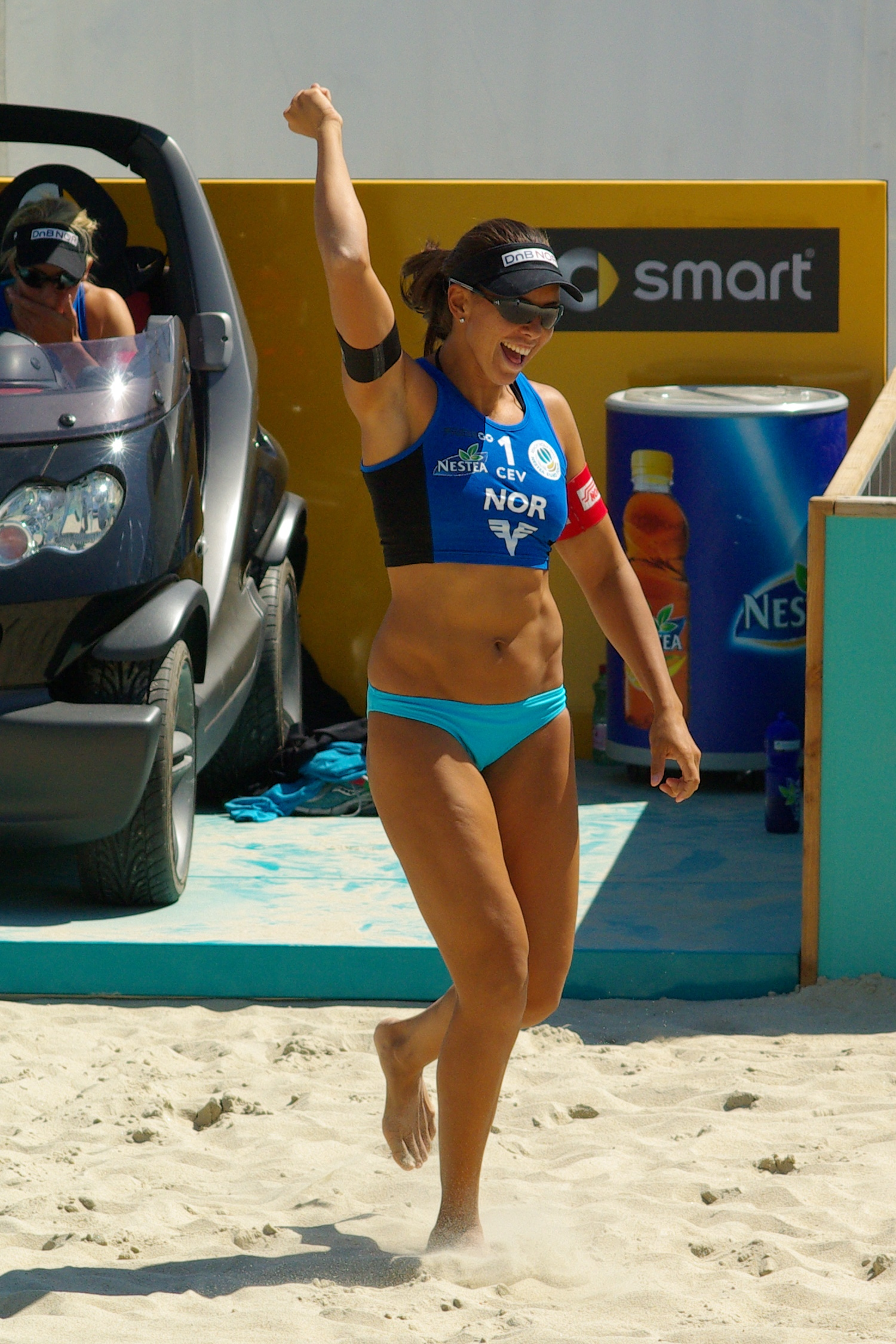
- Hakedal in 2008

Personal information
- Full name: Nila Ann Håkedal
- Born: 13 June 1979 (age 47); Kristiansand, Norway
- Height: 5 ft 10 in (1.78 m)
Honours
Women's beach volleyball
Representing Norway
European Championships
| Bronze medal – third place | 2006 The Hague | Beach |
| Bronze medal – third place | 2007 Valencia | Beach |
World Tour
| Silver medal – second place | 2007 China Shanghai Jinshan Open | Beach |

Nila Ann Håkedal (born 13 June 1979 in Kristiansand) is a Norwegian female beach volleyball player.

Håkedal was born and raised in the city of Kristiansand, and lived there until she was 20 years old. She started playing volleyball for Hånes VBK when she was 13, and continued in the club until she moved to Oslo during the autumn of 1999 to play for Koll volleyball club, and to study languages.

Håkedal started playing beach volleyball during the summer of 1995, and between 1995 and 2001 she played with Lise Roald Hansen as partner. Her beach volleyball partner since 2002 has been Ingrid Tørlen. The pair competed in the 2004 Summer Olympics in Athens where they placed 22nd.
