= Natalya Uryadova =

Russian beach volleyball player (born 1977)

Personal information
- Born: March 15, 1977 (age 49) Moscow
Medal record
Women's volleyball
Representing Russia
European Championships
Gold medal – first place	2006 The Hague	Beach

Natalya Nikolayevna Uryadova (Russian: Наталья Николаевна Урядова; born March 15, 1977, in Moscow) is a female beach volleyball player from Russia. She claimed the gold medal at the 2006 European Championships in The Hague, Netherlands, partnering with Alexandra Shiryaeva. She also competed at the 2008 Summer Olympics.

== Playing partners ==
- Anna Bobrova
- Alexandra Shiryaeva
