= Markus Egger =

Swiss beach volleyball player (born 1975)

Personal information
- Born: 24 February 1975 (age 51); Zug, Switzerland
- Height: 6 ft 3 in (191 cm)

Beach volleyball information
Teammate
Sascha Heyer, Bernhard Vesti, Martin Laciga
Honours
Men's beach volleyball
Representing Switzerland
European Championships
Gold medal – first place	2001 Jesolo	Beach
Silver medal – second place	2000 Bilbao	Beach
Silver medal – second place	2004 Timmendorfer Strand	Beach
Bronze medal – third place	2003 Alanya	Beach

Markus Egger (born 24 February 1975 in Zug) is a retired professional male beach volleyball player from Switzerland. Partnering Sascha Heyer he claimed the gold medal at the 2001 European Championships in Jesolo, Italy.

== Playing partners ==
- Sascha Heyer
- Bernhard Vesti
- Martin Laciga
