= Kathrine Maaseide =

Norwegian beach volleyball player (born 1976)

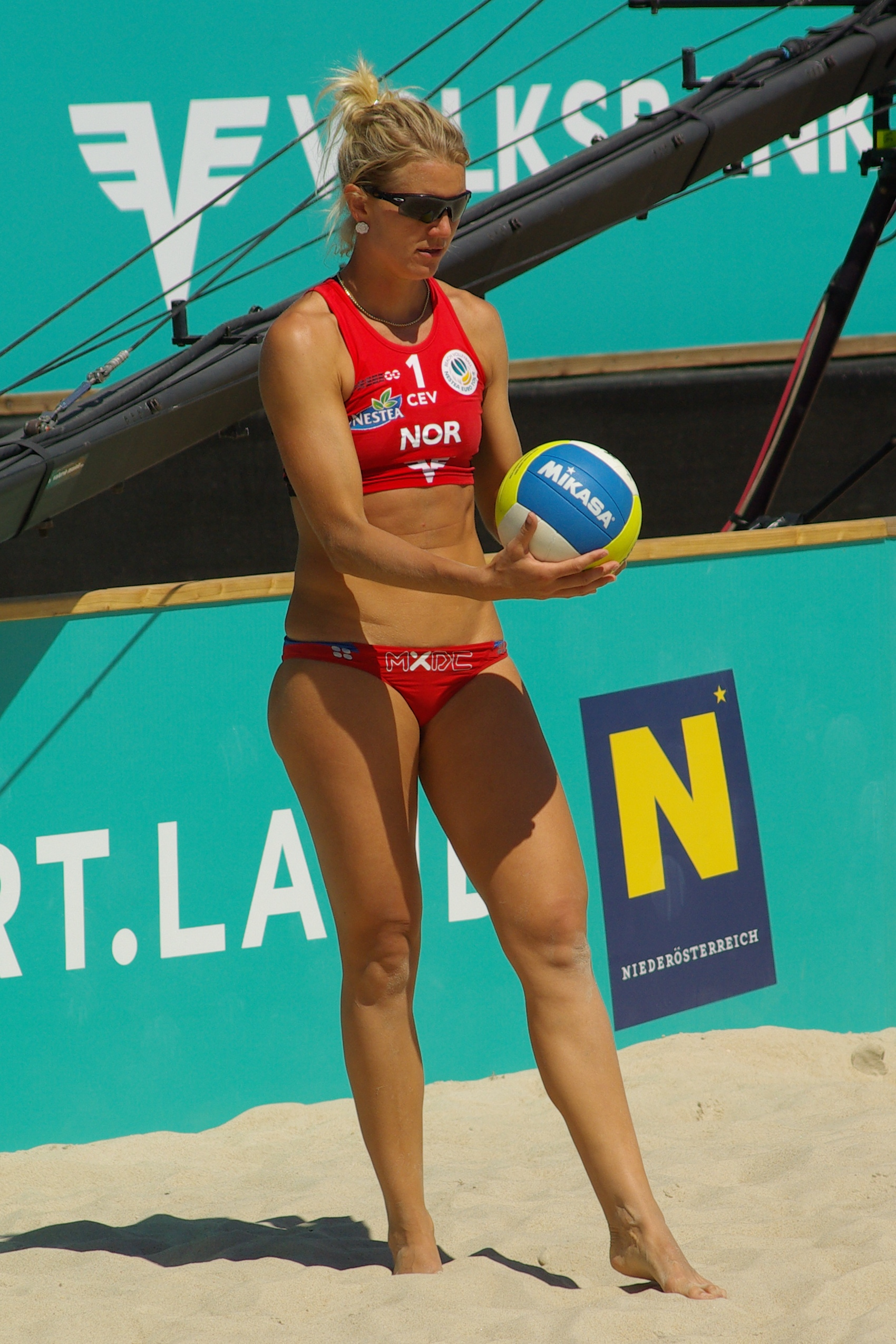

Personal information
- Nationality: Norwegian
- Born: 18 December 1976 (age 49); Stavanger, Norway
- Height: 6 ft 0 in (183 cm)
Honours
Women's beach volleyball
Representing Norway
European Championships
Silver medal – second place	2004 Timmendorfer Strand	Beach

Kathrine Maaseide (born 18 December 1976, in Stavanger) is a female former professional beach volleyball player from Norway who represented her native country at the 2004 Summer Olympics in Athens, Greece. Partnering with Susanne Glesnes, she claimed the silver medal at the 2004 European Championships in Timmendorfer Strand, Germany. She is the sister of professional beach volleyball player Bjørn Maaseide.
