= Kjell Schneider =

German beach volleyball player (born 1976)

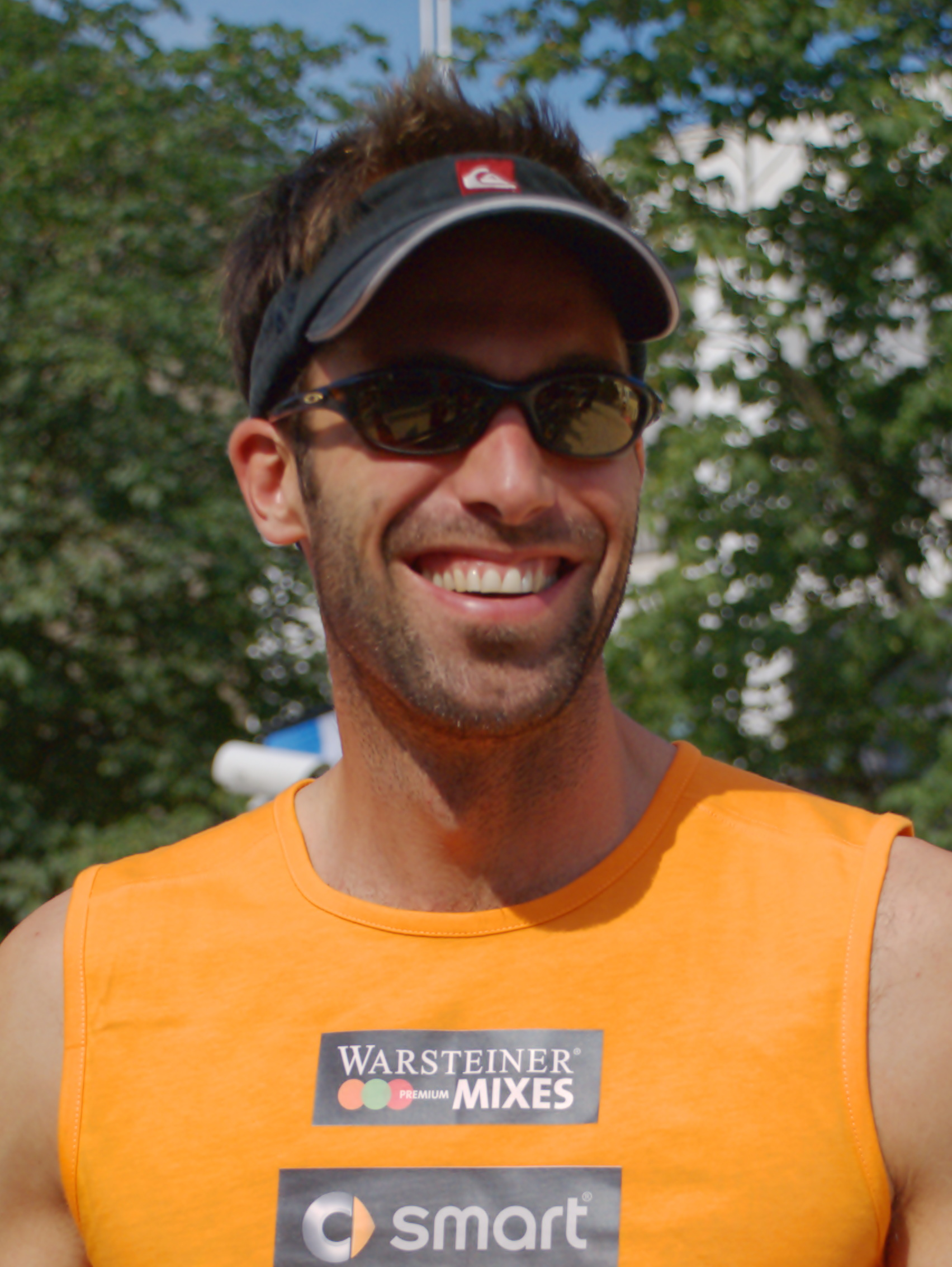

Personal information
- Born: October 4, 1976 (age 50); Kiel, Germany
- Height: 6 ft 6 in (198 cm)
Honours
Men's beach volleyball
Representing Germany
World Championships
Bronze medal – third place	2005 Berlin	Beach

Kjell Schneider (born October 4, 1976 in Kiel) is a beach volleyball player from Germany who won the bronze medal in the men's beach team competition at the 2005 Beach Volleyball World Championships in Berlin, Germany, partnering with Julius Brink.
