= Ingrid Tørlen =

Norwegian beach volleyball player (born 1979)

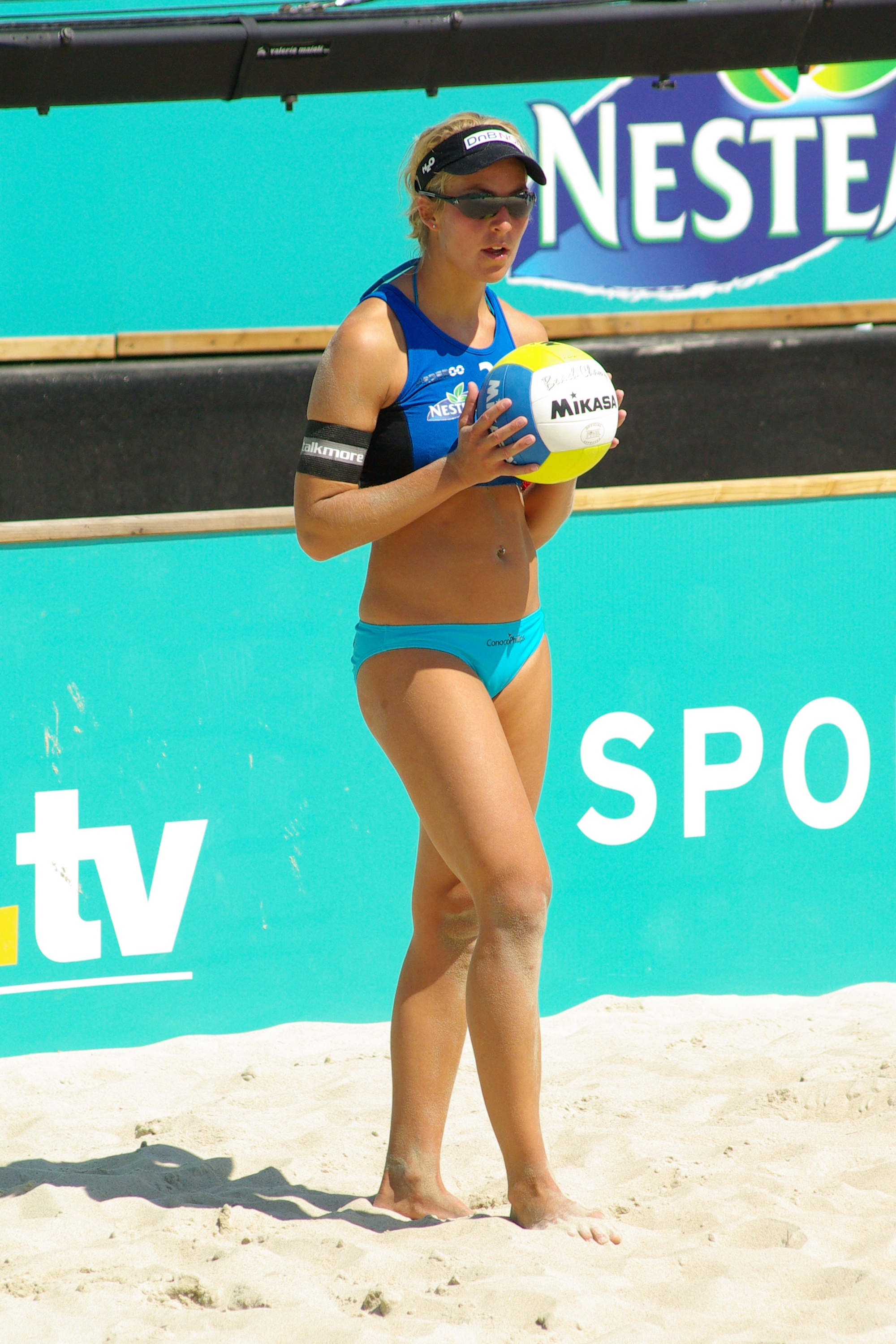
- Tørlen in 2008

Personal information
- Born: July 21, 1979 (age 47); Ålesund, Norway
Honours
Women's beach volleyball
Representing Norway
European Championships
Bronze medal – third place	2006 The Hague	Beach
Bronze medal – third place	2007 Valencia	Beach

Ingrid Tørlen (born July 21, 1979 in Ålesund) is a Norwegian female beach volleyball player. Her beach volleyball partner since 2002 has been Nila Håkedal. The pair competed in the 2004 Summer Olympics in Athens, Greece where they placed 22nd.

== Playing partners ==
- Nila Håkedal
- Cecilie Josefsen
- Janne Kongshavn
