= Benjamin Insfran =

Brazilian beach volleyball player (born 1972)

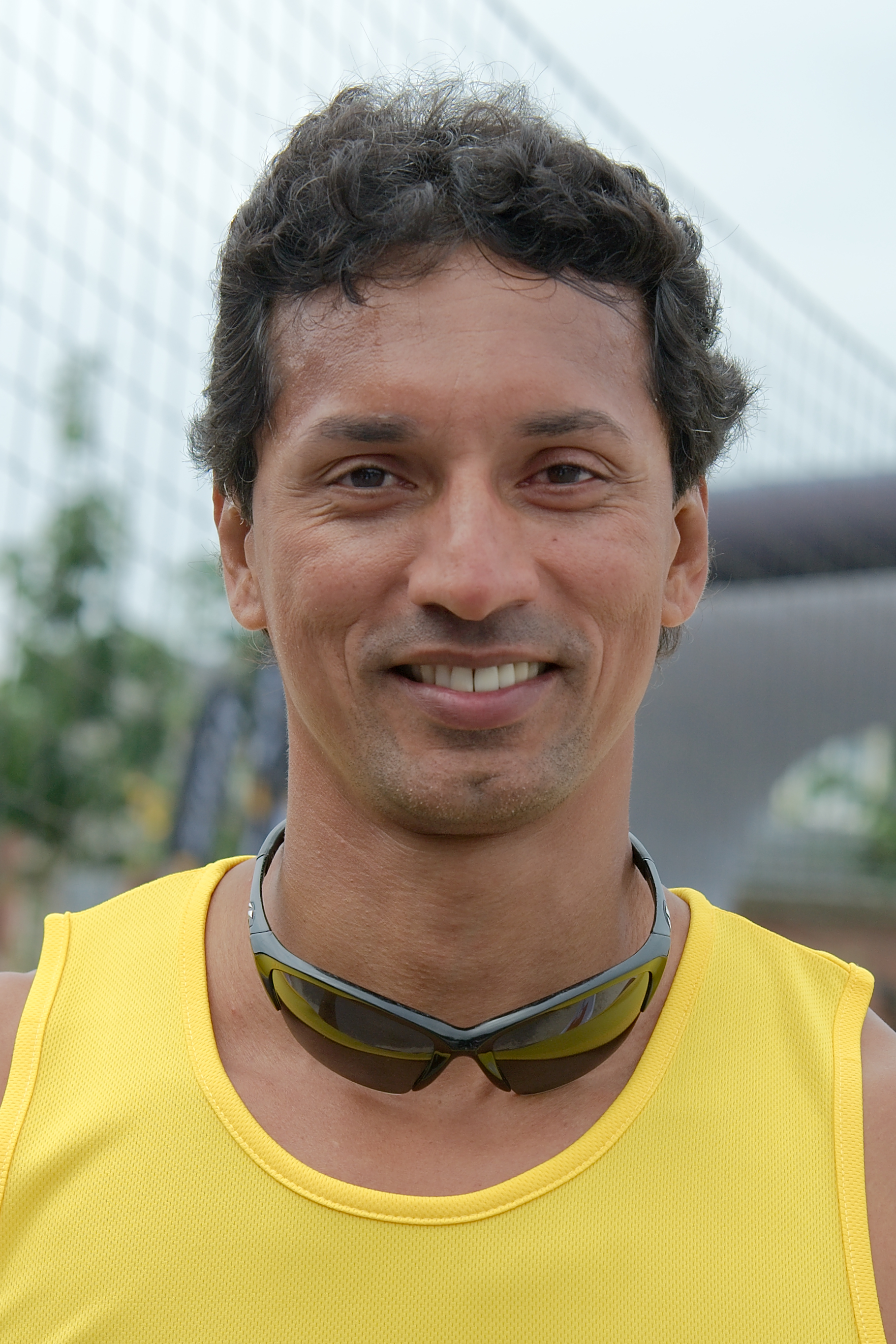
- Insfran in Germany, 2013

Personal information
- Born: 14 April 1972 (age 54); Porto Murtinho, Mato Grosso do Sul, Brazil
- Height: 6 ft 5 in (196 cm)
Honours
Men's beach volleyball
Representing Brazil
World Championships
Bronze medal – third place	2003 Rio de Janeiro	Beach

Benjamin Insfran (born 14 April 1972 in Porto Murtinho, Mato Grosso do Sul) is a male former beach volleyball player from Brazil. Insfran and partner Márcio Araújo won the bronze medal at the 2003 Beach Volleyball World Championships in Rio de Janeiro, Brazil, and represented their native country at the 2004 Summer Olympics in Athens, Greece.
