= Gijs Ronnes =

Dutch beach volleyball player (born 1977)

Personal information
- Born: 10 June 1977 (age 49); Boxmeer, Netherlands
Medal record
Men's beach volleyball
Representing the Netherlands
European Championships
Silver medal – second place	2006 The Hague	Beach

Gijs Ronnes (born 10 June 1977 in Boxmeer, North Brabant) is a male beach volleyball player from the Netherlands. He claimed the silver medal at the 2006 European Championships in The Hague, Netherlands, partnering Jochem de Gruijter. His younger brother Bram is also a professional beach volleyball player in the international circuit.

His father Frans Ronnes is mayor of Haaren.

== Playing partners ==
- Max Backer
- Jochem de Gruijter
