= Stefan Kobel =

Swiss beach volleyball player (born 1974)

Personal information
- Born: 13 February 1974 (age 52); Winterthur, Switzerland
- Height: 190 cm (6 ft 3 in)
Honours
Men's beach volleyball
Representing Switzerland
Olympic Games
Bronze medal – third place	2004 Athens	Beach
European Championships
Silver medal – second place	2005 Moscow	Beach
Bronze medal – third place	2004 Timmendorfer Strand	Beach
Bronze medal – third place	2006 The Hague	Beach

Stefan Kobel (born 13 February 1974 in Winterthur) is a Swiss beach volleyball player. With his partner Patrick Heuscher, he won the bronze medal at the 2004 Summer Olympics.

== Awards ==
=== Summer Olympics ===
- Bronze medal in 2004 in Athens (Greece) with Patrick Heuscher

=== European Championships ===
- Silver medal in 2005 in Moscow (Russia) with Patrick Heuscher
- Bronze medal in 2004 at Timmendorfer Strand (Germany) with Patrick Heuscher
- Bronze medal in 2006 in The Hague (Netherlands) with Patrick Heuscher
