= Julius Brink =

German beach volleyball player

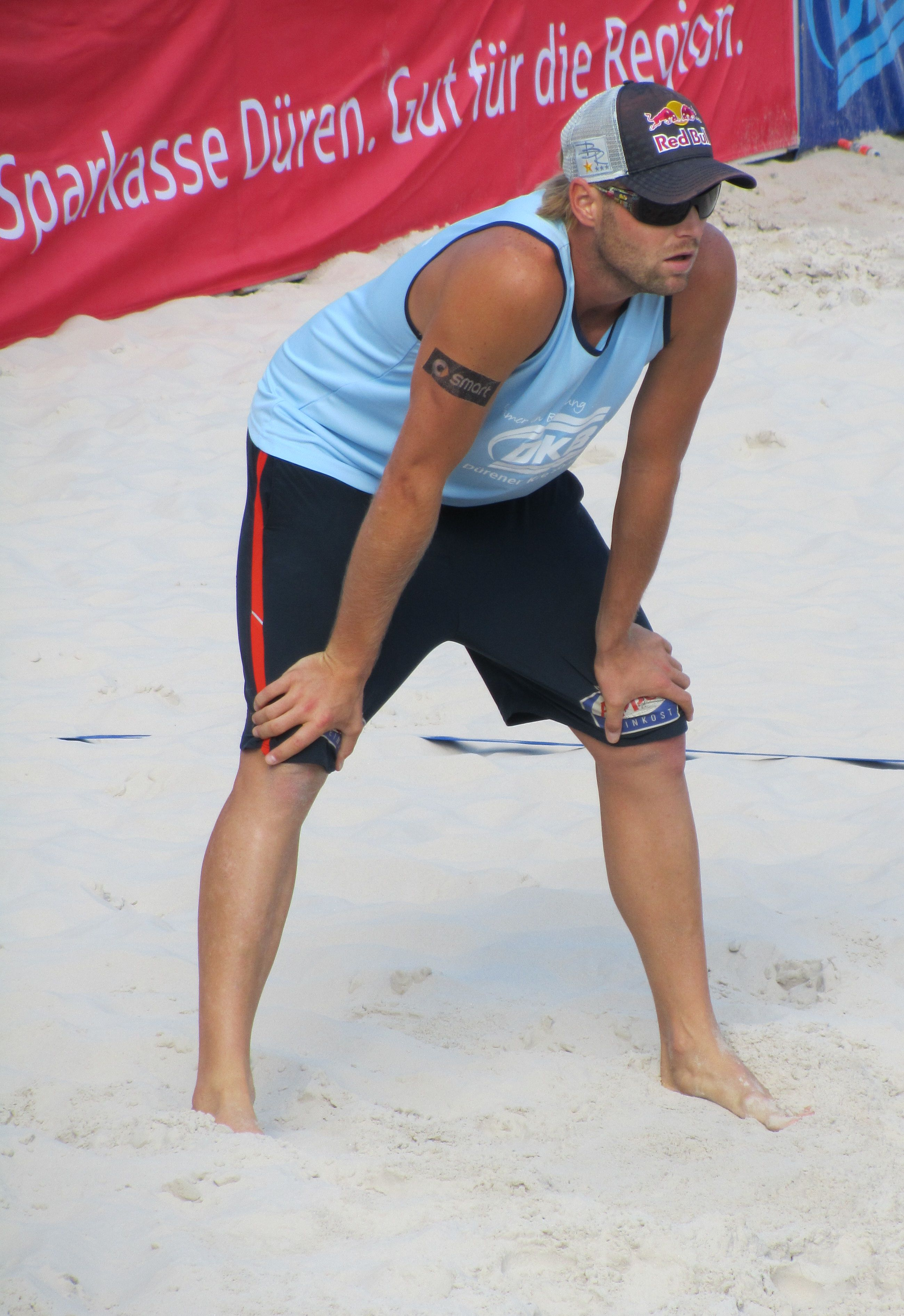

Personal information
- Born: 6 July 1982 (age 44); Münster, West Germany
- Height: 6 ft 1 in (1.85 m)
Honours
Men's beach volleyball
Representing Germany
Olympic Games
Gold medal – first place	2012 London	Beach
World Championships
Gold medal – first place	2009 Stavanger	Beach
Bronze medal – third place	2005 Berlin	Beach
Bronze medal – third place	2011 Rome	Beach
European Championships
Gold medal – first place	2006 The Hague	Beach

Julius Brink (born 6 July 1982) is a German beach volleyball player who won the gold medal in the men's beach team competition at the 2006 European Beach Volleyball Championships in The Hague, Netherlands, partnering with Christoph Dieckmann. He took part at the Olympic Games in 2008.

In 2009, Brink and his current partner, Jonas Reckermann, won four FIVB competitions (three consecutive Grand Slams) and the German Masters of the CEV European Championship Tour. This includes the 2009 FIVB World Championship, held from 26 June to 5 July in Stavanger, Norway, beating top seeded Harley/Alison in the final and former FIVB world champions and gold medalist of the 2008 Summer Olympics Rogers/Dalhausser in the semi-final. They are the first German and European team ever to win a world championship title and are currently ranked 22nd on the FIVB World Tour (as of 23 July 2012).

On 9 August 2012, Brink and his teammate, Jonas Reckermann, won the gold medal at the 2012 London Olympics. With this victory Germany become the first European country to win the Beach Volleyball in Olympics.

== Playing partners ==
- Kjell Schneider
- Rudiger Strosik
- Markus Dieckmann
- Christoph Dieckmann
- Jonas Reckermann

== Sponsors ==
- Swatch

Sporting positions
Preceded by Harley Marques and Pedro Solberg Salgado (BRA)	Men's FIVB Beach Volley World Tour Winner alongside (Germany) Jonas Reckermann; 2009	Succeeded by Phil Dalhausser and Todd Rogers (USA)
Awards
Preceded by Harley Marques and Pedro Solberg Salgado (BRA)	Men's FIVB World Tour "Team of the Year" alongside (Germany) Jonas Reckermann; 2009	Succeeded by Phil Dalhausser and Todd Rogers (USA)
