= Patrick Heuscher =

Swiss beach volleyball player (born 1976)

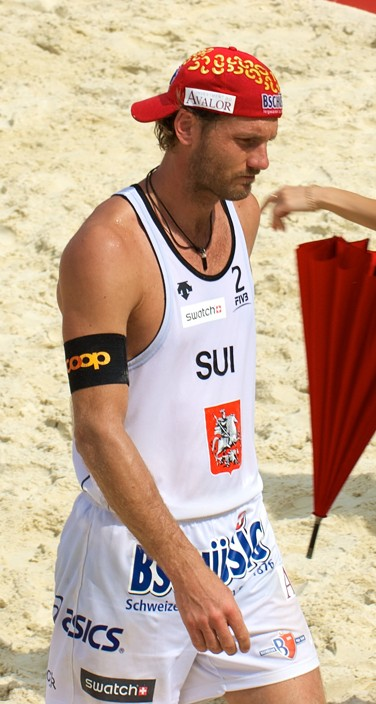

Personal information
- Born: 22 December 1976 (age 49); Frauenfeld
- Height: 194 cm (6 ft 4 in)

Beach volleyball information
Years	Teammate
2004; 2007–2011; 2012	Stefan Kobel; Sascha Heyer; Jefferson Bellaguarda
Honours
Men's beach volleyball
Representing Switzerland
Olympic Games
Bronze medal – third place	2004 Athens	Beach
European Championships
Silver medal – second place	2005 Moscow	Beach
Bronze medal – third place	2004 Timmendorfer Strand	Beach
Bronze medal – third place	2006 The Hague	Beach

Patrick Heuscher (born 22 December 1976 in Frauenfeld) is a Swiss beach volleyball player. With his partner Stefan Kobel he won the bronze medal at the 2004 Summer Olympics. Between 2007 and 2011 he teamed with Sascha Heyer, they finished 17th at the Beijing Olympics. At the 2012 Summer Olympics he teamed with Jefferson Bellaguarda. They reached the round of 16.
