= Petra Novotná (volleyball) =

Czech volleyball player (born 1981)

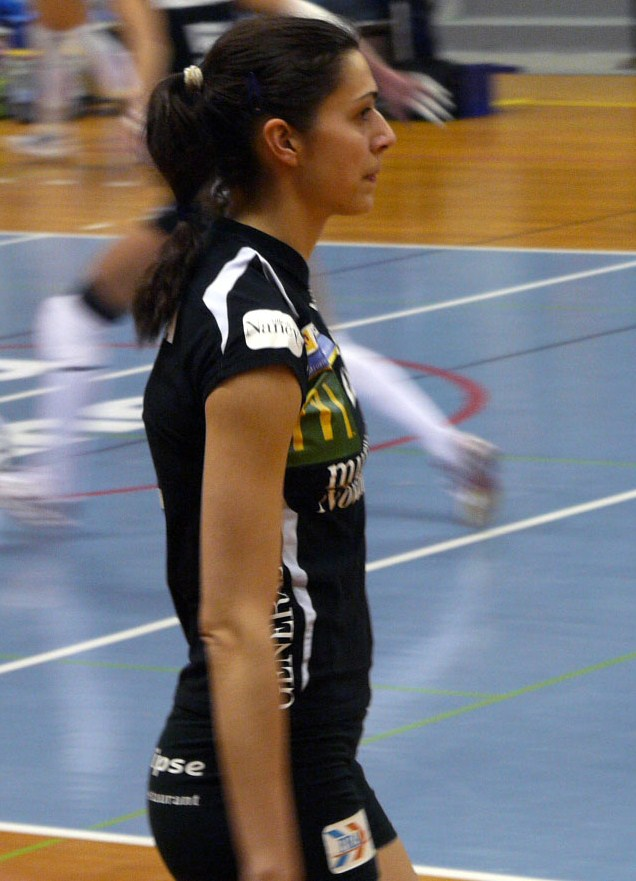

Personal information
- Nationality: Czech
- Born: 10 April 1981 (age 45)
- Height: 1.87 m (6 ft 2 in)

Volleyball information
- Position: universal
- Current club: PVK Olymp Prag
- Number: 12 (national team)

National team
2002	Czech Republic

Petra Novotná (born 10 April 1981) is a retired Czech female volleyball player, who played as a universal. She was part of the Czech Republic women's national volleyball team.

She participated at the 2002 FIVB Volleyball Women's World Championship in Germany. On club level she played with PVK Olymp Prag.

== Clubs ==
- PVK Olymp Prag (2002)
