= Jochem de Gruijter =

Dutch volleyball player (born 1978)

Personal information
- Full name: Jochem Pieter de Gruijter
- Nationality: Dutch
- Born: 18 April 1978 (age 48); Leidschendam, Netherlands
- Height: 199 cm (6 ft 6 in)
- Weight: 92 kg (203 lb)
- Spike: 338 cm (133 in)
- Block: 328 cm (129 in)

Volleyball information
- Position: Outside hitter

National team
1997–2003	Netherlands
Honours
Men's volleyball
Representing the Netherlands
World Grand Champions Cup
Silver medal – second place	1997 Japan	Indoor
European Championships
Gold medal – first place	1997 Netherlands	Indoor
Men's beach volleyball
Representing the Netherlands
European Beach Championships
Silver medal – second place	2006 The Hague	Beach

Jochem Pieter de Gruijter (born 18 April 1978, in Leidschendam, South Holland) is a retired volleyball player from the Netherlands, who was a member of the Dutch national men's team that won the gold medal at the 1997 European Championships on home soil (Eindhoven and Den Bosch).

De Gruijter made his international debut for the Netherlands in 1995 against Italy. He obtained a total number of 120 caps for the national team. Later on he started a career in beach volleyball, partnering Gijs Ronnes.
