= Christoph Dieckmann (beach volleyball) =

German beach volleyball player (born 1976)

Personal information
- Nationality: German
- Born: 7 January 1976 (age 50); Bonn, West Germany
- Height: 198 cm (6 ft 6 in)
Honours
Men's beach volleyball
Representing Germany
European Championships
Gold medal – first place	2006 The Hague	Beach

Christoph Dieckmann (born 7 January 1976 in Bonn) is a male beach volleyball player from Germany. He claimed the gold medal at the 2006 European Championships in The Hague, Netherlands, partnering Julius Brink. He competed at the 2004 Summer Olympics in Athens, Greece. His twin brother, Markus, is also a professional beach volleyball player in the international circuit.

== Playing partners ==
- Julius Brink
- Markus Dieckmann
- Andreas Scheuerpflug

== Sponsors ==
- Swatch
