= Volleyball at the 2008 Summer Olympics – Qualification =

NOC is allowed to enter 1 men's and 1 women's qualified team in volleyball tournaments and 2 men's and 2 women's qualified teams in beach volleyball tournaments.

== Indoor Volleyball ==
=== Men ===
Volleyball Men	Date	Host	Vacancies	Qualified
Host nation	-	-	1	China
2007 FIVB Men's World Cup	Nov 18 - Dec 2, 2007	Japan	3	Brazil; Russia; Bulgaria
African Olympic Qualification Tournament	February 3–9, 2008	(South Africa) Durban	1	Egypt
Asian Olympic Qualification Tournament*	May 31 - Jun 8, 2008	(Japan) Tokyo	1	Japan
European Olympic Qualification Tournament	January 7–13, 2008	(Turkey) İzmir	1	Serbia
North American Olympic Qualification Tournament	January 6–11, 2008	(Puerto Rico) Caguas	1	United States
South American Olympic Qualification Tournament	January 3–7, 2008	(Argentina) Formosa	1	Venezuela
World Olympic Qualification Tournament 1	May 23–25, 2008	(Germany) Düsseldorf	1	Germany
World Olympic Qualification Tournament 2	May 30 - Jun 1, 2008	(Portugal) Espinho	1	Poland
World Olympic Qualification Tournament 3	May 31 - Jun 8, 2008	(Japan) Tokyo	1	Italy
TOTAL			12	

* The Asian Olympic Qualification Tournament is combined with the World Olympic Qualification Tournament 3. The winner of the tournament will qualify as the champion of the World Olympic Qualification Tournament 3 while the best Asian team except the winner will qualify as the Asian Olympic Qualification Tournament champion.

==== World Cup ====
Rk	Team	Points	Won	Lost	PW	PL	Ratio
1	Brazil	21	10	1	852	673	1.266
2	Russia	20	9	2	899	742	1.212
3	Bulgaria	20	9	2	988	881	1.121
4	United States	19	8	3	947	843	1.123
5	Spain	18	7	4	848	825	1.028
6	Puerto Rico	16	5	6	878	869	1.010
7	Argentina	16	5	6	825	876	0.942
8	Australia	15	4	7	839	940	0.893
9	Japan	14	3	8	865	923	0.937
10	Egypt	14	3	8	829	922	0.899
11	South Korea	13	2	9	818	947	0.864
12	Tunisia	12	1	10	909	1056	0.861

==== African Qualification Tournament ====
Rk	Team	Points	Won	Lost	PW	PL	Ratio
1	Algeria	8	4	0	322	253	1.273
2	Cameroon	7	3	1	311	265	1.174
3	Nigeria	6	2	2	309	346	0.893
4	South Africa	5	1	3	340	359	0.947
5	Rwanda	4	0	4	295	353	0.836

Rk	Team	Points	Won	Lost	PW	PL	Ratio
1	Egypt	8	4	0	340	247	1.377
2	Tunisia	7	3	1	341	248	1.375
3	Morocco	6	2	2	263	236	1.114
4	Gabon	5	1	3	208	286	0.727
5	Mozambique	4	0	4	179	300	0.597

Semi-finals
Algeria	3
Tunisia	2
Egypt	3
Cameroon	1

Final
Algeria	2
Egypt	3
Third place
Cameroon	3
Tunisia	2

==== European Qualification Tournament ====
===== Elimination round =====
Team 1	Agg	Team 2	1st leg	2nd leg
Montenegro	6–3	Latvia	3–1	3–2
Georgia	0–6	Romania	0–3	0–3
Austria	3–5	Sweden	3–2	0–3
Azerbaijan	0–6	Denmark	0–3	0–3

===== Pre-Qualification Tournaments =====
Tournament 1

Rk	Team	Points	Won	Lost	SW	SL	Ratio
1	Finland	4	2	0	6	2	3.000
2	Hungary	3	1	1	3	3	1.000
3	Estonia	2	0	2	2	6	0.333

Rk	Team	Points	Won	Lost	SW	SL	Ratio
1	Poland	4	2	0	6	0	MAX
2	Belgium	3	1	1	3	3	1.000
3	Denmark	2	0	2	0	6	0.000

Semi-finals
Finland	3
Belgium	0
Poland	3
Hungary	1

Final
Finland	0
Poland	3

Tournament 2

Rk	Team	Points	Won	Lost	SW	SL	Ratio
1	Germany	3	1	1	5	3	1.667
2	Czech Republic	3	1	1	5	5	1.000
3	Portugal	3	1	1	3	5	0.600

Rk	Team	Points	Won	Lost	SW	SL	Ratio
1	France	4	2	0	6	0	MAX
2	Sweden	3	1	1	3	5	0.600
3	Slovakia	2	0	2	2	6	0.333

Semi-finals
Germany	3
Sweden	0
France	0
Czech Republic	3

Final
Germany	3
Czech Republic	2

Tournament 3

Rk	Team	Points	Won	Lost	SW	SL	Ratio
1	Italy	4	2	0	6	2	3.000
2	Croatia	3	1	1	5	4	1.250
3	Montenegro	2	0	2	1	6	0.167

Rk	Team	Points	Won	Lost	SW	SL	Ratio
1	Netherlands	4	2	0	6	0	MAX
2	Greece	3	1	1	3	4	0.750
3	Romania	2	0	2	1	6	0.167

Semi-finals
Italy	3
Greece	0
Netherlands	3
Croatia	0

Final
Italy	3
Netherlands	2

===== Qualification Tournament =====
Rk	Team	Points	Won	Lost	SW	SL	Ratio
1	Spain	5	2	1	7	7	1.000
2	Netherlands	5	2	1	6	6	1.000
3	Poland	4	1	2	7	6	1.167
4	Italy	4	1	2	5	6	0.833

Rk	Team	Points	Won	Lost	SW	SL	Ratio
1	Serbia	5	2	1	8	4	2.000
2	Finland	5	2	1	6	5	1.200
3	Germany	5	2	1	6	7	0.857
4	Turkey	3	0	3	5	9	0.556

Semi-finals
Spain	3
Finland	1
Serbia	3
Netherlands	0

Final
Spain	2
Serbia	3

==== North American Qualification Tournament ====
Rk	Team	Points	Won	Lost	PW	PL	Ratio
1	United States	6	3	0	225	157	1.433
2	Puerto Rico	5	2	1	232	202	1.149
3	Dominican Republic	4	1	2	209	221	0.946
4	Barbados	3	0	3	139	225	0.618

Rk	Team	Points	Won	Lost	PW	PL	Ratio
1	Canada	6	3	0	246	194	1.268
2	Cuba	5	2	1	242	193	1.254
3	Mexico	4	1	2	201	195	1.031
4	Trinidad and Tobago	3	0	3	118	225	0.524

Quarter-finals
United States
Bye
Cuba	3
Dominican Republic	0
Canada
Bye
Puerto Rico	3
Mexico	2

Semi-finals
United States	3
Cuba	0
Canada	0
Puerto Rico	3

Final
United States	3
Puerto Rico	0
Third place
Cuba	3
Canada	1

==== South American Qualification Tournament ====
Rk	Team	Points	Won	Lost	PW	PL	Ratio
1	Venezuela	8	4	0	322	233	1.382
2	Argentina	7	3	1	309	244	1.266
3	Paraguay	6	2	2	301	334	0.901
4	Chile	5	1	3	278	320	0.869
5	Uruguay	4	0	4	244	323	0.755

==== World Qualification Tournaments ====
Tournament 1

Rk	Team	Points	Won	Lost	PW	PL	Ratio
1	Germany	6	3	0	295	259	1.139
2	Cuba	5	2	1	271	238	1.139
3	Spain	4	1	2	284	282	1.007
4	Chinese Taipei	3	0	3	177	248	0.714

Tournament 2

Rk	Team	Points	Won	Lost	PW	PL	Ratio
1	Poland	6	3	0	226	179	1.263
2	Portugal	5	2	1	236	206	1.146
3	Puerto Rico	4	1	2	199	236	0.843
4	Indonesia	3	0	3	185	225	0.822

Tournament 3

Rk	Team	Points	Won	Lost	PW	PL	Ratio
1	Italy	14	7	0	615	483	1.273
2	Japan	13	6	1	659	584	1.128
3	South Korea	11	4	3	622	584	1.065
4	Argentina	11	4	3	598	589	1.015
5	Australia	10	3	4	522	526	0.992
6	Iran	9	2	5	597	630	0.948
7	Algeria	9	2	5	501	578	0.867
8	Thailand	7	0	7	425	565	0.752

* Japan is counted as The Asian Continental Qualification Tournament Champion since it is the best Asian team except the winner.

=== Women ===
Volleyball Women	Date	Host	Vacancies	Qualified
Host nation	-	-	1	China
2007 FIVB Women's World Cup	November 2–16, 2007	Japan	3	Italy; Brazil; United States
African Olympic Qualification Tournament	January 22–26, 2008	(Algeria) Blida	1	Algeria
Asian Olympic Qualification Tournament*	May 17–25, 2008	(Japan) Tokyo	1	Kazakhstan
European Olympic Qualification Tournament	January 15–20, 2008	(Germany) Halle	1	Russia
North American Olympic Qualification Tournament	December 17–22, 2007	(Mexico) Monterrey	1	Cuba
South American Olympic Qualification Tournament	January 3–7, 2008	(Peru) Lima	1	Venezuela
World Olympic Qualification Tournament	May 17–25, 2008	(Japan) Tokyo	3	Poland; Serbia; Japan
TOTAL			12	

- The Asian Olympic qualification tournament and the World Olympic Qualification Tournament are combined into one event. The top 3 teams at the tournament will qualify as the medallists of the World Olympic Qualification Tournament while the best Asian team outside the top 3 will qualify as the Asian Olympic Qualification Tournament champion.

==== World Cup ====
Rk	Team	Points	Won	Lost	PW	PL	Ratio
1	Italy	22	11	0	858	604	1.421
2	Brazil	20	9	2	891	671	1.328
3	United States	20	9	2	940	821	1.145
4	Cuba	19	8	3	1020	951	1.073
5	Serbia	18	7	4	910	866	1.051
6	Poland	17	6	5	908	820	1.107
7	Japan	17	6	5	885	866	1.022
8	South Korea	15	4	7	825	848	0.973
9	Dominican Republic	14	3	8	797	911	0.875
10	Thailand	13	2	9	784	924	0.848
11	Peru	12	1	10	681	855	0.796
12	Kenya	11	0	11	498	860	0.579

==== African Qualification Tournament ====
Rk	Team	Points	Won	Lost	PW	PL	Ratio
1	Algeria	8	4	0	322	201	1.602
2	Kenya	7	3	1	274	216	1.269
3	Cameroon	6	2	2	279	280	0.996
4	Senegal	5	1	3	260	321	0.810
5	South Africa	4	0	4	183	300	0.610

==== European Qualification Tournament ====
===== Pre-Qualification Tournaments =====
Tournament 1

Rk	Team	Points	Won	Lost	SW	SL	Ratio
1	Netherlands	8	4	0	12	1	12.000
2	Ukraine	7	3	1	9	4	2.250
3	Czech Republic	6	2	2	7	8	0.875
4	Azerbaijan	5	1	3	5	11	0.455
5	Hungary	4	0	4	3	12	0.250

Tournament 2

Rk	Team	Points	Won	Lost	SW	SL	Ratio
1	Romania	7	3	1	11	3	3.667
2	Bulgaria	7	3	1	10	5	2.000
3	Slovakia	6	2	2	7	8	0.875
4	Belarus	6	2	2	6	7	0.857
5	Belgium	4	0	4	1	12	0.083

Tournament 3

Rk	Team	Points	Won	Lost	SW	SL	Ratio
1	Turkey	8	4	0	12	0	MAX
2	Croatia	7	3	1	9	4	2.250
3	Spain	6	2	2	7	6	1.167
4	France	5	1	3	3	11	0.273
5	Austria	4	0	4	2	12	0.167

===== Qualification Tournament =====
Rk	Team	Points	Won	Lost	SW	SL	Ratio
1	Russia	6	3	0	9	2	4.500
2	Serbia	5	2	1	7	6	1.167
3	Romania	4	1	2	6	8	0.750
4	Croatia	3	0	3	3	9	0.333

Rk	Team	Points	Won	Lost	SW	SL	Ratio
1	Poland	6	3	0	9	4	2.250
2	Germany	4	1	2	6	6	1.000
3	Netherlands	4	1	2	5	7	0.714
4	Turkey	4	1	2	4	7	0.571

Semi-finals
Russia	3
Germany	0
Poland	3
Serbia	1

Final
Russia	3
Poland	2

==== North American Qualification Tournament ====
Rk	Team	Points	Won	Lost	PW	PL	Ratio
1	Cuba	4	2	0	175	151	1.159
2	Canada	3	1	1	172	182	0.945
3	Puerto Rico	2	0	2	192	206	0.932

Rk	Team	Points	Won	Lost	PW	PL	Ratio
1	Dominican Republic	4	2	0	150	89	1.685
2	Mexico	3	1	1	128	116	1.103
3	Trinidad and Tobago	2	0	2	77	150	0.513

Quarter-finals
Cuba
Bye
Mexico	0
Puerto Rico	3
Dominican Republic
Bye
Canada	3
Trinidad and Tobago	0

Semi-finals
Cuba	3
Puerto Rico	0
Dominican Republic	0
Canada	3

Final
Cuba	3
Canada	0
Third place
Puerto Rico	3
Dominican Republic	2

==== South American Qualification Tournament ====
Rk	Team	Points	Won	Lost	PW	PL	Ratio
1	Venezuela	8	4	0	358	267	1.341
2	Peru	7	3	1	334	214	1.561
3	Uruguay	6	2	2	290	287	1.010
4	Paraguay	5	1	3	253	319	0.793
5	Bolivia	4	0	4	216	364	0.593

==== World Qualification Tournament ====
Rk	Team	Points	Won	Lost	PW	PL	Ratio
1	Poland	13	6	1	608	524	1.160
2	Serbia	13	6	1	624	538	1.160
3	Japan	13	6	1	684	619	1.105
4	Dominican Republic	11	4	3	577	554	1.042
5	Kazakhstan	9	2	5	523	572	0.914
6	South Korea	9	2	5	534	609	0.877
7	Thailand	8	1	6	573	617	0.929
8	Puerto Rico	8	1	6	503	593	0.848

* Kazakhstan is counted as The Asian Continental Qualification Tournament Champion since it is the best Asian team outside the top 3.

== Beach Volleyball ==
=== Qualifying criteria ===
The main qualifying criteria were the FIVB Beach Volleyball Olympic Ranking lists as of July 21, 2008. It provided a total of 24 pairs in each event. Each NOC was allowed to enter 2 men's and 2 women's qualified teams in beach volleyball tournaments. Each continent and Host nation is guaranteed one entry in each event. If this is not satisfied by the entry selection method, the highest ranking player/pair will be qualified.

=== Qualifiers ===
==== Men ====
No.	Rank	Players	NOC	
1	1	Todd Rogers; Phil Dalhausser	United States	C
2	2	Ricardo Santos; Emanuel Rego	Brazil	C
3	3	Marcio Araujo; Fabio Luiz Magalhães	Brazil	
4	4	Reinder Nummerdor; Richard Schuil	Netherlands	C
5	6	Xu Linyin; Wu Penggen	China	HC
6	7	Julius Brink; Christoph Dieckmann	Germany	
7	8	Dmitri Barsouk; Igor Kolodinsky	Russia	
8	9	David Klemperer; Eric Koreng	Germany	
9	12	Jake Gibb; Sean Rosenthal	United States	
10	13	Andrew Schacht; Joshua Slack	Australia	
11	14	Pablo Herrera; Raul Mesa	Spain	
12	15	Sascha Heyer; Patrick Heuscher	Switzerland	
13	16	Martín Conde; Mariano Baracetti	Argentina	
14	17	Kristjan Kais; Rivo Vesik	Estonia	
15	18	Clemens Doppler; Peter Gartmayer	Austria	
16	19	Emiel Boersma; Bram Ronnes	Netherlands	
17	21	Renato Gomes; Jorge Terceiro	Georgia	
18	22	Jørre Kjemperud; Tarjei Skarlund	Norway	
19	23	Florian Gosch; Alexander Horst	Austria	
20	24	Martin Laciga; Jan Schnider	Switzerland	
21	25	Aleksandrs Samoilovs; Martins Plavins	Latvia	
22	26	Riccardo Lione; Matteo Varnier*	Italy	
23	28	Kentaro Asahi; Katsuhiro Shiratori	Japan	
24	84	Emanuel Fernandes; Morais Abreu	Angola	C

* Matteo Varnier is replaced by Eugenio Amore on the Italian team, because of an injury to Varnier.

H = Host Country Quota
C = Continental Quota

==== Women ====
No.	Rank	Players	NOC	
1	1	Kerri Walsh; Misty May-Treanor	United States	C
2	2	Tian Jia; Wang Jie	China	HC
3	3	Juliana Felisberta; Larissa França	Brazil	C
4	4	Xue Chen; Zhang Xi	China	
5	5	Nicole Branagh; Elaine Youngs	United States	
6	6	Talita Antunes; Renata Ribeiro	Brazil	
7	9	Vasso Karadassiou; Vassiliki Arvaniti	Greece	C
8	11	Sara Goller; Laura Ludwig	Germany	
9	12	Stephanie Pohl; Okka Rau	Germany	
10	13	Natalie Cook; Tamsin Barnett	Australia	
11	16	Nila Håkedal; Ingrid Tørlen	Norway	
12	20	Kathrine Maaseide; Susanne Glesnes	Norway	
13	21	Dalixia Fernández; Tamara Larrea	Cuba	
14	23	Doris Schwaiger; Stefanie Schwaiger	Austria	
15	25	Liesbet Van Breedam; Liesbeth Mouha	Belgium	
16	26	Imara Esteves; Milagros Crespo	Cuba	
17	27	Efthalia Koutroumanidou; Maria Tsiartsiani	Greece	
18	28	Natalya Uryadova; Alexandra Shiryaeva	Russia	
19	29	Rebekka Kadijk; Merel Mooren	Netherlands	
—	30	Sara Montagnolli; Sabine Swoboda	Austria*	
20	31	Bibiana Candelas; Mayra García	Mexico	
21	32	Mika Teru Saiki; Chiaki Kusuhara	Japan	
22	33	Cristine Santanna; Andrezza Martins	Georgia	
23	34	Simone Kuhn; Lea Schwer	Switzerland*	
24	81	Judith Augoustides; Vita Nel	South Africa	C

* Austrian team Montagnolli - Swoboda is replaced by the Swiss team Kuhn - Schwer, because of medical reasons.

H = Host Country Quota
C = Continental Quota
