= Nestea European Championship Tour 2008 =

Tournament details
- Host country: various
- Dates: April - September, 2008
- Venue: (in 7 host cities)

The 2008 NESTEA European Championship Tour (or the 2008 European Beach Volleyball Tour) is a European beach volleyball tour.

The tour consists of seven tournaments with both genders, including the 2008 Championship Final.

== Tournaments ==
- Spanish Masters, in Gran Canaria, Spain - 17–20 April 2008
- Austrian Masters, in St. Pölten, Austria - 9–12 May 2008
- Swiss Masters, in Lucerne, Switzerland - 22–25 May 2008
- Dutch Masters, in The Hague, Netherlands - 29 May - 1 June 2008
- 2008 Nestea European Championship Final, in Hamburg, Germany - 10–13 July 2008
- English Masters, in Blackpool, England - 11–14 September 2008
- Masters Final, in Sochi, Russia - 19–21 September 2008

== Tournament results ==
=== Women ===
Event	Gold	Silver	Bronze
Spanish Masters	(Germany) Goller-Ludwig	(Austria) Montagnolli-Swoboda	(Norway) Glesnes-Maaseide
Austrian Masters	(Germany) Pohl-Rau	(Germany) Goller-Ludwig	(Greece) Arvanity-Karadassiou
Swiss Masters	(Greece) Arvanity-Karadassiou	(Switzerland) Kuhn-Schwer	(Norway) Hakedal-Toerlen
Dutch Masters	(Netherlands) Kadijk-Mooren	(Germany) Banck-Günther	(Austria) Schwaiger-Schwaiger
Final	(Germany) Goller-Ludwig	(Norway) Hakedal-Torlen	(Norway) Glesnes-Maaseide
English Masters	(Greece) Arvanity-Karadassiou	(Finland) Nyström-Nyström	(Greece) Koutroumanidou-Tsiartsiani
Masters Final	(Germany) Goller-Ludwig	(Austria) Schwaiger-Schwaiger	(Latvia) Jursone-Minusa

=== Men ===
Event	Gold	Silver	Bronze
Spanish Masters	(Netherlands) Nummerdor-Schuil	(Spain) Herrera-Mesa	(Germany) Brink-Dieckmann C.
Austrian Masters	(Germany) Matysik-Uhmann	(Austria) Gosch-Horst	(Germany) Klemperer-Koreng
Swiss Masters	(Germany) Matysik-Uhmann	(France) Ces-Ces	(Poland) Fijalek-Prudel
Dutch Masters	(Germany) Matysik-Uhmann	(Germany) Klemperer-Koreng	(Netherlands) Nummerdor-Schuil
Final	(Netherlands) Nummerdor-Schuil	(Germany) Matysik-Uhmann	(Russia) Barsouk-Kolodinsky
English Masters	(Netherlands) Nummerdor-Schuil	(Switzerland) Heuscher-Heyer	(Switzerland) Laciga M.-Schnider
Masters Final	(Netherlands) Nummerdor-Schuil	(Germany) Klemperer-Koreng	(Switzerland) Heuscher-Heyer

== Medal table ==
Rank	Nation	Gold	Silver	Bronze	Total
1	Germany	7	5	2	14
2	Netherlands	5	0	1	6
3	Greece	2	0	2	4
4	Austria	0	3	1	4
5	Switzerland	0	2	2	4
6	Norway	0	1	3	4
7	Finland	0	1	0	1
7	France	0	1	0	1
7	Spain	0	1	0	1
10	Latvia	0	0	1	1
10	Poland	0	0	1	1
10	Russia	0	0	1	1
Totals (12 entries)		14	14	14	42
