= Nestea European Championship Tour 2007 =

Tournament details
- Host country: Austria, Russia, Germany, Switzerland, Netherlands, Spain
- Dates: May – August, 2007
- Venue: (in 6 host cities)

The 2007 NESTEA European Championship Tour (or the 2007 European Beach Volleyball Tour) was the European beach volleyball tour for 2007.

The tour consists of six tournaments with both genders, including the 2007 Championship Final.

== Tournaments ==
- Nestea Austrian Masters, in St. Pölten, Austria – 17–20 May 2007
- Nestea Russian Masters, in Moscow, Russia – 31 May – 3 June 2007
- Nestea German Masters, in Hamburg, Germany – 14–17 June 2007
- Nestea Swiss Masters, in Lucerne, Switzerland – 5–8 July 2007
- Nestea Dutch Masters, in The Hague, Netherlands – 9–12 August 2007
- 2007 Nestea European Championship Final, in Valencia, Spain – 23–25 August 2007

== Tournament results ==
=== Women ===
Event	Gold	Silver	Bronze
Nestea Austrian Masters	(Greece) Arvaniti-Karadassiou	(Norway) Hakedal-Torlen	(Finland) Nystrom-Nystrom
Nestea Russian Masters	(Germany) Holtwick-Semmler	(Russia) Shiryaeva-Uryadova	(Germany) Claasen-Roder
Nestea German Masters	(Netherlands) Kadijk-Mooren	(Germany) Pohl-Rau	(Germany) Holtwick-Semmler
Nestea Swiss Masters	(Germany) Holtwick-Semmler	(Austria) Montagnolli-Swoboda	(Austria) Schwaiger-Schwaiger
Nestea Dutch Masters	(Netherlands) Kadijk-Mooren	(Czech Republic) Celbova-Petrova	(Netherlands) Van Iersel-Wesselink
Final	(Greece) Arvaniti-Karadassiou	(Germany) Goller-Ludwig	(Norway) Hakedal-Torlen

=== Men ===
Event	Gold	Silver	Bronze
Nestea Austrian Masters	(Germany) Brink-Dieckmann	(Netherlands) Nummerdor-Schuil	(Estonia) Kais-Vesik
Nestea Russian Masters	(Germany) Brink-Dieckmann	(Estonia) Kais-Vesik	(Germany) Klemperer-Koreng
Nestea German Masters	(Austria) Berger-Nowotny	(Germany) Klemperer-Koreng	(Netherlands) Boersma-Ronnes
Nestea Swiss Masters	(Switzerland) Heuscher-Heyer	(Netherlands) Boersma-Ronnes	(Switzerland) Laciga-Laciga
Nestea Dutch Masters	(Netherlands) Boersma-Ronnes	(Netherlands) Nummerdor-Schuil	(Germany) Matysik-Uhmann
Final	(Austria) Doppler-Gartmayer	(Netherlands) Nummerdor-Schuil	(Germany) Klemperer-Koreng

== Medal table by country ==
Rank	Nation	Gold	Silver	Bronze	Total
1	Germany	4	3	5	12
2	Netherlands	3	4	2	9
3	Austria	2	1	1	4
4	Greece	2	0	0	2
5	Switzerland	1	0	1	2
6	Estonia	0	1	1	2
6	Norway	0	1	1	2
8	Czech Republic	0	1	0	1
8	Russia	0	1	0	1
10	Finland	0	0	1	1
Totals (10 entries)		12	12	12	36
