= Nestea European Championship Tour 2005 =

Tournament details
- Host country: Turkey, Spain, Switzerland, Russia
- Dates: May – August, 2005
- Venue: (in 4 host cities)

The 2005 NESTEA European Championship Tour (or the 2005 European Beach Volleyball Tour) was the European beach volleyball tour for 2005.

The tour consisted of four tournaments with both genders, including the 2005 Championship Final.

== Tournaments ==
- Nestea Turkish Open, in Alanya, Turkey – 12–15 May 2005
- Nestea Spanish Open, in Valencia, Spain – 7–10 July 2005
- Nestea Swiss Open, in Lucerne, Switzerland – 7–9 August 2005
- 2005 Nestea European Championship Final (Nestea Russian Open), in Moscow, Russia – 25–28 August 2005

== Tournament results ==
=== Women ===
Event	Gold	Silver	Bronze
Nestea Turkish Open	(Italy) Gattelli-Perrotta	(Netherlands) Kadijk-Mooren	(Germany) Pohl-Rau
Nestea Spanish Open	(Germany) Pohl-Rau	(Greece) Arvaniti-Karadassiou	(Netherlands) Kadijk-Mooren
Nestea Swiss Open	(Greece) Arvaniti-Karadassiou	(Switzerland) Simone Kuhn-Lea Schwer	(Norway) Hakedal-Torlen
Nestea Russian Open	(Greece) Arvaniti-Karadassiou	(Netherlands) Kadijk-Mooren	(Germany) Pohl-Rau

=== Men ===
Event	Gold	Silver	Bronze
Nestea Turkish Open	(Switzerland) Egger-Laciga	(Germany) Dieckmann-Reckermann	(Switzerland) Heuscher-Kobel
Nestea Spanish Open	(Switzerland) Egger-Laciga	(Germany) Dieckmann-Scheuerpflug	(Italy) Lione-Varnier
Nestea Swiss Open	(Germany) Dieckmann-Scheuerpflug	(Switzerland) Heuscher-Kobel	(Switzerland) Egger-Laciga
Nestea Russian Open	(Spain) Herrera-Mesa	(Switzerland) Heuscher-Kobel	(Germany) Dieckmann-Reckermann

== Medal table ==
Rank	Nation	Gold	Silver	Bronze	Total
1	Switzerland	2	3	2	7
2	Germany	2	2	3	7
3	Greece	2	1	0	3
4	Italy	1	0	1	2
5	Spain	1	0	0	1
6	Netherlands	0	2	1	3
7	Norway	0	0	1	1
Totals (7 entries)		8	8	8	24
