= 2008 Nestea European Championship final =

Volleyball competition held in Germany

2008 European Beach Volleyball Championships

Tournament details
- Host country: Germany
- Dates: July 10–13, 2008
- Teams: 64
- Venue: Rathausmarkt / Gr. Elbstraße (in Hamburg host cities)

The 2008 NESTEA European Championship Final (or the 2008 European Beach Volleyball Championships) was held from July 10–13, 2008 in Hamburg, Germany. It was the sixteenth official edition of the European Beach Volleyball Championships men's event, which started in 1993, while the women competed for the fifteenth time.

The Championships were part of the 2008 Nestea European Championship Tour.

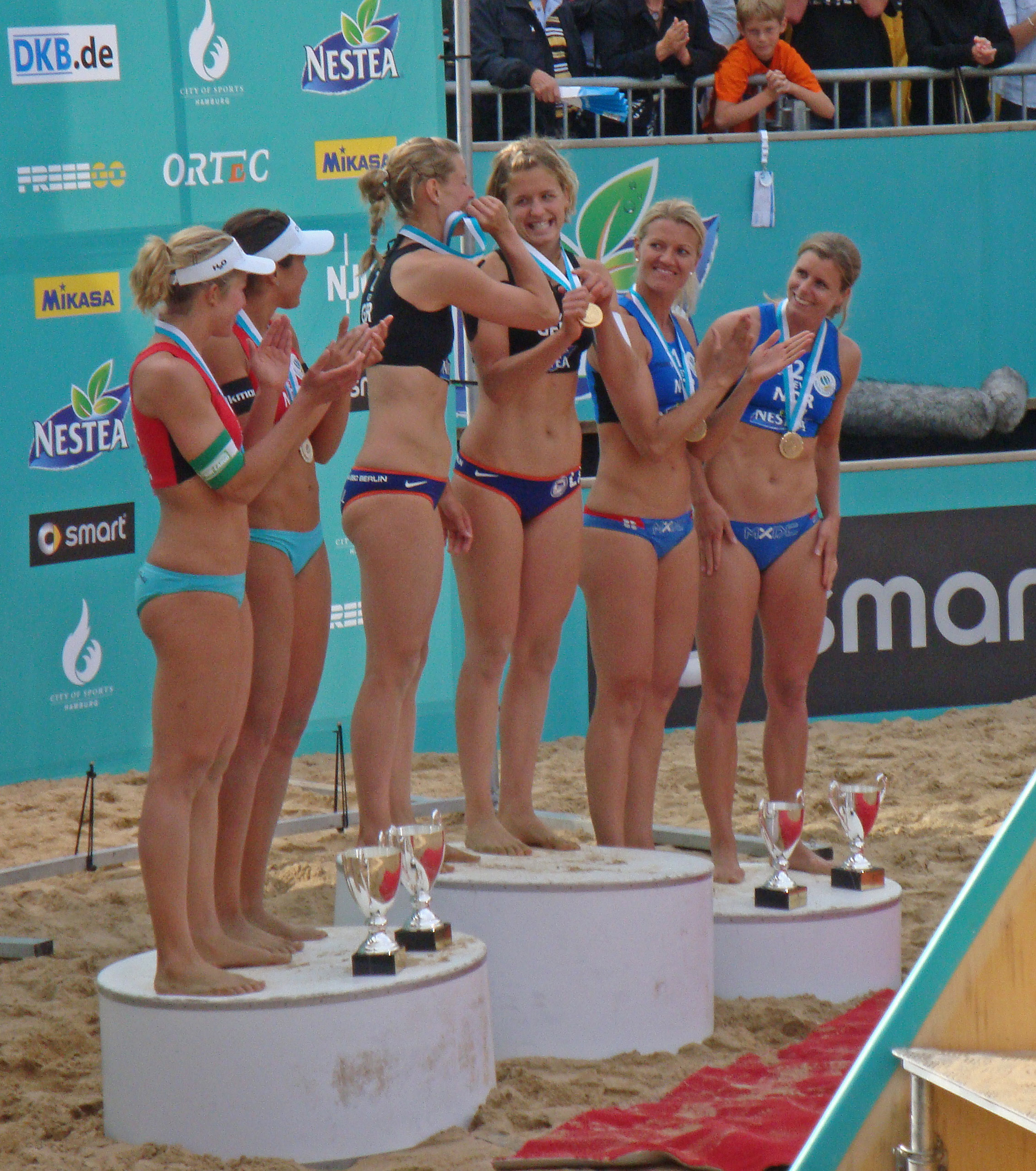
The women's competition medal winners.

The teams could earn qualifying points for the Beijing 2008 Olympics, from one of their two finishes at the 2008 or 2007 Championships.

== Women's competition ==
- A total number of 32 participating couples

RANK	FINAL RANKING	EARNINGS	POINTS
	Goller - Ludwig (GER)	€20,000.00	800
	Hakedal - Torlen (NOR)	€15,000.00	720
	Maaseide - Glesnes (NOR)	€10,500.00	640
4.	Pohl - Rau (GER)	€7,500.00	560
5.	Schwaiger D. - Schwaiger S. (AUT)	€5,500.00	480
5.	Mouha - Van Breedam (BEL)	€5,500.00	480
7.	van Iersel - Wesselink (NED)	€4,000.00	400
7.	Arvaniti - Karadassiou (GRE)	€4,000.00	400
9.	Chagas - Santanna (GEO)	€3,000.00	320
9.	Koutroumanidou - Tsiartsiani (GRE)	€3,000.00	320
9.	Claasen - Roder (GER)	€3,000.00	320
9.	de Kogel-Kadijk - Mooren (NED)	€3,000.00	320
13.	Montagnolli - Swoboda (AUT)	€2000.00	240
13.	Holtwick - Semmler (GER)	€2000.00	240
13.	Bratkova - Ukolova (RUS)	€2000.00	240
13.	Brink-Abeler - Jurich (GER)	€2000.00	240
17.	Banck - Guenther (GER)	€1000.00	160
17.	Jursone - Minusa (LAT)	€1000.00	160
17.	Renkema - Wiltens (NED)	€1000.00	160
17.	Grossen - Kayser (SUI)	€1000.00	160
17.	Hajeckova - Novotna P. (CZE)	€1000.00	160
17.	Kuhn - Schwer L. (SUI)	€1000.00	160
17.	Graessli - Zumkehr (SUI)	€1000.00	160
17.	Alcon - Matveeva (ESP)	€1000.00	160

The teams Gemise-Fareau-Giordano (FRA), Faure M.-Sarpaux V. (FRA), Nyström Em.-Nyström Er. (FIN), Baburina-Osheyko (UKR), Alseda Aizcorbe-Hopf Aguilar (ESP), Kolocova-Slukova (CZE), Gschweidl-Hansel B. (AUT) and Hanzelova-Tomasekova (SVK) were placed 25th, with 80 points each and no prize money.

== Men's competition ==
- A total number of 32 participating couples

RANK	FINAL RANKING	EARNINGS	POINTS
	Nummerdor - Schuil Ri. (NED)	€20,000.00	800
	Matysik - Uhmann (GER)	€15,000.00	720
	Barsouk - Kolodinsky (RUS)	€10,500.00	640
4.	(25x17px)	€
5.	(25x17px)	€
5.	(25x17px)	€
7.	(25x17px)	€
7.	(25x17px)	€
9.	(25x17px)	€
9.	(25x17px)	€
9.	(25x17px)	€
9.	(25x17px)	€
13.	(25x17px)	€
13.	(25x17px)	€
13.	(25x17px)	€
13.	(25x17px)	€
17.	(25x17px)	€
17.	(25x17px)	€
17.	(25x17px)	€
17.	(25x17px)	€
17.	(25x17px)	€
17.	(25x17px)	€
17.	(25x17px)	€
17.	(25x17px)	€
