= Swatch FIVB World Tour 2008 =

Tournament details
- Host country: Various
- Dates: March - November, 2008

The Swatch FIVB World Tour 2008 is an international beach volleyball competition.

The tour consists of 15 tournaments with both genders and 9 separate gender tournaments.

The top eight finishes that a team has from January 1, 2007, to July 20, 2008, on the Swatch FIVB World Tour (2007 and 2008), SWATCH FIVB World Championships (2007) and on FIVB recognised Continental Championship Finals, counts towards Olympic qualification for the Beijing 2008 Olympic Games. The top 24 teams of each gender will compete in the Beijing Games. There can be a maximum of two teams per country.

== Grand Slam ==
There are six Grand Slam tournaments. These events give a higher number of points and more money than the rest of the tournaments.

- Berlin, Germany – Smart Grand Slam, June 10–15, 2008
- Paris, France – Henkel Grand Chelem, June 16–22, 2008
- Stavanger, Norway – ConocoPhillips Grand Slam Stavanger, June 24–29, 2008
- Moscow, Russia – Moscow Grand Slam, July 1–6, 2008
- Gstaad, Switzerland – 1 to 1 Energy Grand Slam 2008, July 22–27, 2008
- Klagenfurt, Austria – A1 Beach Volleyball Grand Slam presented by Nokia, July 28 - August 2, 2008

== Tournament results ==
=== Women ===
Event	Gold	Silver	Bronze
Adelaide Australia Open	(Brazil) Juliana-Larissa	(Brazil) Talita-Renata	(Brazil) Ana Paula-Shelda
China Shanghai Jinshan Open	(Brazil) Renata-Talita	(Brazil) Juliana-Larissa	(China) Xue-Zhang Xi
Seoul Open	(China) Xue-Zhang Xi	(Brazil) Ana Paula-Shelda	(United States) Branagh-Youngs
Keihan/Smfg Japan Open	(Brazil) Juliana-Larissa	(China) Tian Jia-Wang	(China) Xue-Zhang Xi
Hyundai Open Barcelona	(United States) Branagh-Youngs	(Brazil) Renata-Talita	(Brazil) Juliana-Larissa
Mazury Open	(Brazil) Ana Paula-Shelda	(United States) Wacholder-Turner	(Brazil) Maria Clara-Carol
Smart Grand Slam	(United States) Walsh-May-Treanor	(China) Tian Jia-Wang	(Brazil) Juliana-Larissa
Henkel Grand Chelem	(United States) Walsh-May-Treanor	(United States) Wacholder-Turner	(United States) Branagh-Youngs
ConocoPhillips Grand Slam; Stavanger	(United States) Walsh-May-Treanor	(Greece) Karantasiou-Arvaniti	(United States) Ross-Boss
Moscow Grand Slam	(China) Xue-Zhang Xi	(United States) Branagh-Youngs	(China) Tian Jia-Wang
World Series 13	(Germany) Pohl-Rau	(Brazil) Antonelli-Leao	(Brazil) Maria Clara-Carol
1 to 1 Energy Grand Slam 2008	(Brazil) Ana Paula-Shelda	(China) Tian Jia-Wang	(China) Xue-Zhang Xi
A1 Beach Volleyball Grand Slam presented by NOKIA	(Brazil) Ana Paula-Shelda	(Ukraine) Osheyko-Baburina	(Germany) Holtwick-Semmler
Otera Open Kristiansand	(Brazil) Antonelli-Leao	(Norway) Hakedal-Torlen	(Austria) D. Schwaiger-S. Schwaiger
Myslowice Open	(Brazil) Maria Clara-Carol	(Germany) Holtwick-Semmler	(Norway) Hakedal-Torlen
Brazil Open	(Brazil) Vivian-Larissa	(Brazil) Shaylyn-Agatha	(Brazil) Ana Paula-Shelda
Dubai Open	(United States) Walsh-Branagh	(United States) Ross-Boss	(Brazil) Maria Clara-Carol
Phuket Thailand Open	(United States) Ross-Boss	(United States) Branagh-Turner	(Germany) Banck-Günther
Sanya Open	(United States) Ross-Boss	(China) Y. Huang-Zhang Xi	(United States) Branagh-Turner

=== Men ===
Event	Gold	Silver	Bronze
Adelaide Australia Open	(Brazil) Harley-Pedro	(China) Xu-Wu	(United States) Rogers-Dalhausser
China Shanghai Jinshan Open	(Brazil) Harley-Pedro	(China) Xu-Wu	(Brazil) Franco-Cunha
Prague Open	(United States) Gibb-Rosenthal	(Germany) Brink-Dieckmann Ch.	(Brazil) Ricardo-Emanuel
Italian Open presented by Abruzzo	(Brazil) Harley-Pedro	(Germany) Brink-Dieckmann Ch.	(United States) Rogers-Dalhausser
VIP Open	(Netherlands) Nummerdor-Schuil	(China) Xu-Wu	(United States) Fuerbringer-Jennings
Hyundai Open Barcelona	(Germany) Brink-Dieckmann Ch.	(Russia) Barsouk-Kolodinsky	(Brazil) Ricardo-Emanuel
Mazury Open	(Brazil) Ricardo-Emanuel	(Spain) Lario-Gavira	(Australia) Schacht-Slack
Smart Grand Slam	(Brazil) Ricardo-Emanuel	(United States) Rogers-Dalhausser	(Spain) Herrera-Mesa
Henkel Grand Chelem	(United States) Rogers-Dalhausser	(Netherlands) Nummerdor-Schuil	(Germany) Klemperer-Koreng
ConocoPhillips Grand Slam; Stavanger	(United States) Rogers-Dalhausser	(Germany) Reckermann-Urbatzka	(Germany) Brink-Dieckmann Ch.
Moscow Grand Slam	(United States) Rogers-Dalhausser	(China) Xu-Wu	(Germany) Klemperer-Koreng
World Series 13	(Brazil) Márcio Araújo-Fabio	(China) Xu-Wu	(Germany) Matysik-Uhmann
1 to 1 Energy Grand Slam 2008	(Brazil) Harley-Pedro	(Netherlands) Nummerdor-Schuil	(Brazil) Alison-Emanuel
A1 Beach Volleyball Grand Slam presented by NOKIA	(Russia) Barsouk-Kolodinsky	(United States) Williams-Metzger	(Brazil) Ricardo-Emanuel
Otera Open Kristiansand	(Spain) Herrera-Mesa	(Brazil) Maciel-Bruno	(New Zealand) Lochhead-Pitman
Mallorca Open	(Brazil) Harley-Pedro	(Germany) Klemperer-Koreng	(Brazil) Franco-Benjamin
Brazil Open	(Brazil) Harley-Pedro	(Germany) Brink-Dieckmann Ch.	(Germany) Reckermann-Urbatzka
Dubai Open	(Netherlands) Nummerdor-Schuil	(Germany) Reckermann-Urbatzka	(Brazil) Harley-Pedro
Bahrain Open	(Brazil) Alison-Cunha	(France) Cès-Ces	(Germany) Dollinger-Windscheif
Sanya Open	(Brazil) Benjamin-Harley	(Brazil) Pitta-Cunha	(Argentina) Baracetti-Salema

== Medal table by country ==
Rank	Nation	Gold	Silver	Bronze	Total
1	Brazil (BRA)	20	8	14	42
2	United States (USA)	11	7	7	25
3	China (CHN)	2	9	4	15
4	Germany (GER)	2	7	8	17
5	Netherlands (NED)	2	2	0	4
6	Russia (RUS)	1	1	0	2
6	Spain (ESP)	1	1	0	2
8	Norway (NOR)	0	1	1	2
9	France (FRA)	0	1	0	1
9	Greece (GRE)	0	1	0	1
9	Ukraine (UKR)	0	1	0	1
12	Argentina (ARG)	0	0	1	1
12	Australia (AUS)	0	0	1	1
12	Austria (AUT)	0	0	1	1
12	New Zealand (NZL)	0	0	1	1
Totals (15 entries)		39	39	38	116

== Awards ==
=== SWATCH Most Outstanding Player ===
- Maria Antonelli (BRA) for the Otera Open Kristiansand in Kristiansand, Norway
- Talita Antunes (BRA) for the China Shanghai Jinshan Open in Shanghai, China
- Shelda Bede (BRA)
  - for the Mazury Open in Stare Jablonki, Poland
  - for the A1 Beach Volleyball Grand Slam presented by NOKIA in Klagenfurt, Austria
- Nicole Branagh (USA) for the Hyundai Open Barcelona in Barcelona, Spain
- Julius Brink (GER) for the Hyundai Open Barcelona in Barcelona, Spain
- Ana Paula Connelly (BRA) for the 1 to 1 Energy Grand Slam 2008 in Gstaad, Switzerland
- Pedro Cunha (BRA) for the Bahrain Open in Manama, Bahrain
- Phil Dalhausser (USA)
  - for the ConocoPhillips Grand Slam Stavanger, in Stavanger, Norway
  - for the Moscow 2008 Grand Slam in Moscow, Russia
- Juliana Felisberta (BRA)
  - for the Adelaide Australia Open in Adelaide, Australia
  - for the Keihan/Smfg Japan Open in Osaka, Japan
- Larissa França (BRA) for the Brazil Open in Guarujá, Brazil
- Pablo Herrera (ESP) for the Otera Open Kristiansand in Kristiansand, Norway
- Igor Kolodinsky (RUS) for the A1 Beach Volleyball Grand Slam presented by NOKIA in Klagenfurt, Austria
- Inocencio Lario (ESP) for the Mazury Open in Stare Jablonki, Poland
- Fabio Luiz Magalhães (BRA) for the World Series 13 in Marseille, France
- Harley Marques Silva (BRA)
  - for the Adelaide Australia Open in Adelaide, Australia
  - for the China Shanghai Jinshan Open in Shanghai, China
  - for the Italian Open presented by Abruzzo in Roseto degli Abruzzi, Italy
  - for the Brazil Open in Guarujá, Brazil
- Misty May-Treanor (USA)
  - for the Smart Grand Slam in Berlin, Germany
  - for the Henkel Grand Chelem in Paris, France
  - for the ConocoPhillips Grand Slam Stavanger in Stavanger, Norway.
- Reinder Nummerdor (NED) for the Dubai Open in Dubai, United Arab Emirates
- Stephanie Pohl (GER) for the World Series 13 in Marseille, France
- Emanuel Rego (BRA) for the Smart Grand Slam in Berlin, Germany
- Todd Rogers (USA) for the Henkel Grand Chelem in Paris, France
- Sean Rosenthal (USA) for the Prague Open in Prague, Czech Republic
- April Ross (USA) for the Phuket Thailand Open in Phuket, Thailand
- José Salema (ARG) for the Sanya Open in Sanya, China
- Richard Schuil (NED) for the VIP Open in Zagreb, Croatia
- Maria Clara Salgado (BRA) for the Myslowice Open in Myslowice, Poland
- Pedro Solberg Salgado (BRA)
  - for the 1 to 1 Energy Grand Slam 2008 in Gstaad, Switzerland
  - for the Mallorca Open in Mallorca, Spain
- Kerri Walsh (USA) for the Dubai Open in Dubai, United Arab Emirates
- Zhang Xi (CHN)
  - for the Seoul Open in Seoul, South Korea
  - for the Moscow 2008 Grand Slam in Moscow, Russia
  - for the Sanya Open in Sanya, China

== Records ==
The Russian player Igor Kolodinsky shot the fastest serve in the Swatch FIVB World Tour history, when he served at 114.0 km/h at the Italian Open presented by Abruzzo in Roseto degli Abruzzi, Italy.

American player Elaine Youngs, became the oldest women to win an "open" FIVB event, when she was 38 years, three months and 16 days old, when she won the Hyundai Open Barcelona in Barcelona, Spain.
