= 2005 Nestea European Championship final =

These 2005 NESTEA European Championship Final (or the 2005 European Beach Volleyball Championships) was held from June 25 to June 28, 2005 in Moscow, Russia. It was the thirteenth official edition of the men's event, which started in 1993, while the women competed for the twelfth time.

It was the first year Nestea was the title partner of the event, even though it had been the main partner from 2003.

== Men's competition ==
- A total number of 24 participating couples

RANK	FINAL RANKING	EARNINGS	POINTS
	Raul Mesa and Pablo Herrera (ESP)	€20,000.00	200.0
	Patrick Heuscher and Stefan Kobel (SUI)	€15,000.00	180.0
	Markus Dieckmann and Jonas Reckermann (GER)	€10,500.00	160.0
4.	Christoph Dieckmann and Andreas Scheuerpflug (GER)	€7,500.00	140.0
5.	Markus Egger and Martin Laciga (SUI)	€5,500.00	120.0
5.	Juan Garcia Thompson and Javier Luna (ESP)	€5,500.00	120.0
7.	Roman Arkaev and Dmitri Barsouk (RUS)	€4,000.00	100.0
7.	Riccardo Lione and Matteo Varnier (ITA)	€4,000.00	100.0
9.	Fabio Galli and Andrea Raffaelli (ITA)	€3,000.00	80.0
9.	Alexandr Dyachenko and Oleksiy Kulinich (UKR)	€3,000.00	80.0
9.	Janis Grinbergs and Austris Štāls (LAT)	€3,000.00	80.0
9.	Julius Brink and Kjell Schneider (GER)	€3,000.00	80.0
13.	Stéphane Canet and Mathieu Hamel (NOR)	€2,000.00	60.0
13.	Michal Biza and Igor Stejskal (CZE)	€2,000.00	60.0
13.	Haroldas Cyvas and Marius Vasiliauskas (LTU)	€2,000.00	60.0
13.	Vegard Høidalen and Terje Øvergaard (NOR)	€2,000.00	60.0
17.	Rushan Dayanov and Stanislav Eremin (RUS)	€1,000.00	40.0
17.	Leonid Kalinine and Pavel Karpukhin (RUS)	€1,000.00	40.0
17.	Dmitry Karasev and Igor Kolodinsky (RUS)	€1,000.00	40.0
17.	Adrian Caravano and Olivier Conte (FRA)	€1,000.00	40.0
17.	Oliver Indra and Matthias Wachter (LIE)	€1,000.00	40.0
17.	Josef Beneš and Petr Beneš (CZE)	€1,000.00	40.0
17.	Bram Ronnes and Jaap Vos (NED)	€1,000.00	40.0
17.	Mykola Babich and Oleg Nikolaev (UKR)	€1,000.00	40.0

== Women's competition ==
- A total number of 24 participating couples

RANK	FINAL RANKING	EARNINGS	POINTS
	Vassiliki Arvaniti and Vasso Karadassiou (GRE)	€20,000.00	200.0
	Rebekka Kadijk and Merel Mooren (NED)	€15,000.00	180.0
	Stephanie Pohl and Okka Rau (GER)	€10,500.00	160.0
4.	Simone Kuhn and Lea Schwer (SUI)	€7,500.00	140.0
5.	Alexandra Shiryaeva and Natalya Uryadova (RUS)	€5,500.00	120.0
5.	Geeske Banck and Mireya Kaup (GER)	€5,500.00	120.0
7.	Nila Håkedal and Ingrid Tørlen (NOR)	€4,000.00	100.0
7.	Efthalia Koutroumanidou and Maria Tsiartsiani (GRE)	€4,000.00	100.0
9.	Nadia Campisi and Clara Lozano (ESP)	€3,000.00	80.0
9.	Lenka Hajecková and Petra Novotná (CZE)	€3,000.00	80.0
9.	Ruth Flemig and Ilka Semmler (GER)	€3,000.00	80.0
9.	Sarka Nakladalová and Tereza Tobiasová (CZE)	€3,000.00	80.0
13.	Svitlana Baburina and Galyna Osheyko (UKR)	€2,000.00	60.0
13.	Diletta Lunardi and Lucilla Perrotta (ITA)	€2,000.00	60.0
13.	Marion Castelli and Céline Gemise (FRA)	€2,000.00	60.0
13.	Galina Boyko and Olega Bukreeva (RUS)	€2,000.00	60.0
17.	Hana Klapalová and Tereza Petrová (CZE)	€1,000.00	40.0
17.	Julia Mandana and Cati Pol (ESP)	€1,000.00	40.0
17.	Ana Oblak and Mihela Sirk (SLO)	€1,000.00	40.0
17.	Csillia Gudmann and Barbara Kovács (HUN)	€1,000.00	40.0
17.	Isabelle Forrer and Annik Skrivan (SUI)	€1,000.00	40.0
17.	Maria Bratkova and Inna Yudina (RUS)	€1,000.00	40.0
17.	Inese Jursone and Inguna Minusa (LAT)	€1,000.00	40.0
