= European Championship Tour 2003 =

Tournament details
- Host country: Croatia, Greece, Turkey
- Dates: June – August, 2003
- Venue: (in 3 host cities)

The 2003 European Championship Tour (or the 2003 European Beach Volleyball Tour) was the European beach volleyball tour for 2003. This was the first year of the European Championship Tour.

The 2003 tour consisted of three tournaments with both genders, including the 2003 Championship Final.

== Tournaments ==
- Zagreb Challenger, in Zagreb, Croatia – 20–22 June 2003
- Greek Open, in Rethymnon, Greece – 9–13 July 2003
- 2003 European Championship Final, in Alanya, Turkey – 27–31 August 2003

== Tournament results ==
=== Women ===
Event	Gold	Silver	Bronze
Zagreb Challenger	(Czech Republic) Felbabova–Novotná	(Estonia) Graumann–Sutt	(Slovenia) Oblak–Sirk
Greek Open	(Italy) Gattelli–Perrotta	(Czech Republic) Celbová–Nováková	(Switzerland) Kuhn–Schnyder
Final	(Germany) Pohl–Rau	(Germany) Ahmann–Vollmer	(Italy) Gattelli–Perrotta

=== Men ===
Event	Gold	Silver	Bronze
Zagreb Challenger	(Lithuania) Cyvas–Vasiliauskas	(Croatia) Peric–Trimcevski	(Estonia) Kais–Nõmmsalu
Greek Open	(Switzerland) Egger–Heyer	(Norway) Hoidalen–Kjemperud	(Switzerland) Laciga–Laciga
Final	(Austria) Berger–Doppler	(Germany) Dieckmann–Reckermann	(Switzerland) Egger–Heyer

== Medal table by country ==
Position	Country	Gold	Silver	Bronze	Total
1.	Germany	1	2		3
2.	Czech Republic	1	1		2
3.	Switzerland	1		3	4
4.	Italy	1		1	2
5.	Austria	1			1
5.	Lithuania	1			1
7.	Estonia		1	1	2
8.	Croatia		1		1
8.	Norway		1		1
10.	Slovenia			1	1
