= Kristjan Kais =

Estonian beach volleyball player (born 1976)

Personal information
- Full name: Kristjan Kais
- Born: 3 March 1976 (age 50); Paikuse, Estonia
- Height: 1.88 m (6 ft 2 in)
- Weight: 85 kg (187 lb)

Beach volleyball information
| Years | Teammate |
|---|---|
| 1998–2002; 2003–2009; 2010 | Kaarel Kais; Rivo Vesik; Oliver Venno |
Honours
Men's beach volleyball
Representing Estonia
World Tour
| Gold medal – first place | 2007 Zagreb | Beach |
European Championship Tour
| Silver medal – second place | 2006 Swiss Masters | Beach |
| Silver medal – second place | 2007 Russian Masters | Beach |
| Bronze medal – third place | 2007 Austrian Masters | Beach |
| Bronze medal – third place | 2009 Spanish Masters | Beach |

Kristjan Kais (born 3 March 1976) is a retired Estonian beach volleyball player. With teammate Rivo Vesik, he represented Estonia in beach volleyball at the 2008 Summer Olympics in Beijing, China.

== Achievements ==
| Year | Tournament | Venue | Result |
|---|---|---|---|
| 2005 | Beach Volleyball World Championships | Berlin, Germany | 5th |
| 2006 | European Championship Final | The Hague, Netherlands | 7th |
| 2007 | European Championship Final | Valencia, Spain | 4th |
| 2007 | Beach Volleyball World Championships | Gstaad, Switzerland | 5th |

== Overall FIVB World Tour results ==
| Season | Rank | Points | Teammate |
|---|---|---|---|
| 2010 | 77 | 200 | Oliver Venno |
| 2009 | 7 | 3480 | Rivo Vesik |
| 2008 | 26–28 | 1800 | Rivo Vesik |
| 2007 | 19 | 2540 | Rivo Vesik |
| 2006 | 9 | 2680 | Rivo Vesik |
| 2005 | 10 | 2316 | Rivo Vesik |
| 2004 | 16 | 1430 | Rivo Vesik |
| 2003 | 38 | 422 | Rivo Vesik |

== Personal ==
He is married to Liina Kais (born Uibopuu).
