= Rivo Vesik =

Estonian beach volleyball player (born 1980)

Personal information
- Born: 15 July 1980 (age 46); Pärnu, Estonia
- Hometown: Pärnu
- Height: 1.98 m (6 ft 6 in)
- Weight: 90 kg (198 lb)

Beach volleyball information
Years	Teammate
2002–2009; 2010–2012; 2012–2015	Kristjan Kais; Karl Jaani; Kristo Kollo
Honours
Men's beach volleyball
Representing Estonia
World Tour
Gold medal – first place	2007 VIP Open Zagreb	Beach
European Tour
Silver medal – second place	2006 Swiss Masters	Beach
Silver medal – second place	2007 Russian Masters	Beach
Bronze medal – third place	2007 Austrian Masters	Beach
Bronze medal – third place	2009 Spanish Masters	Beach

Rivo Vesik (born 15 July 1980 in Pärnu) is a former Estonian beach volleyball player and current beach volleyball coach. With teammate Kristjan Kais, he represented Estonia in beach volleyball at the 2008 Summer Olympics in Beijing, China.

== Achievements ==
Year	Tournament	Venue	Result
2005	Beach Volleyball World Championships	Berlin, Germany	5th
2006	European Championship Final	The Hague, Netherlands	7th
2007	European Championship Final	Valencia, Spain	4th
2007	Beach Volleyball World Championships	Gstaad, Switzerland	5th
2008	Summer Olympics	Beijing, China	19th

== Overall FIVB World Tour results ==
Season	Rank	Points	Teammate
2015	78	360	Kristo Kollo
2014	76	540	Kristo Kollo
2013	64	700	Kristo Kollo
2012	63	200	Kristo Kollo
2012	79	140	Karl Jaani
2011	42	844	Karl Jaani
2010	29	1420	Karl Jaani
2009	7	3480	Kristjan Kais
2008	26	1800	Kristjan Kais
2007	19	2540	Kristjan Kais
2006	9	2680	Kristjan Kais
2005	10	2316	Kristjan Kais
2004	16	1430	Kristjan Kais
2003	40	374	Kristjan Kais
2002	89	30	Kristjan Kais

== Personal ==
Vesik was married to Kerttu Vesik (born Talvik) from 2010 to 2017.

Awards
Preceded by Phil Dalhausser (USA)	Men's FIVB Beach World Tour "Sportsperson"; 2009	Succeeded by Emanuel Rego (BRA)
