= Swatch FIVB World Tour 2007 =

Tournament details
- Host country: Various
- Dates: May - November, 2007

The Swatch FIVB World Tour 2007 was an international beach volleyball competition.

The tour consists of 12 tournaments with both genders and 10 separate gender tournaments.

One of the tournaments, was the 2007 Beach Volleyball World Championships in Gstaad, Switzerland.

The top eight finishes that a team has from January 1, 2007, to July 20, 2008, on the Swatch FIVB World Tour (2007 and 2008), SWATCH FIVB World Championships (2007) and on FIVB recognised Continental Championship Finals, counts towards Olympic qualification for the Beijing 2008 Olympic Games. The top 24 teams of each gender will compete in the Beijing Games. There can be a maximum of two teams per country.

== Grand Slam ==
There were four Grand Slam tournaments. These events give a higher number of points and more money than the rest of the tournaments.

- Paris, France – Henkel Grand Slam, June 19–24, 2007
- Stavanger, Norway – ConocoPhillips Grand Slam, June 26 - July 1, 2007
- Berlin, Germany – Smart Grand Slam, July 11–15, 2007
- Klagenfurt, Austria – A1 Grand Slam presented by Nokia, August 1–5, 2007

== Tournament results ==
=== Women ===
Event	Gold	Silver	Bronze
China Shanghai Jinshan Open	(China) Tian/Wang	(Norway) Hakedal/Torlen	(Brazil) Talita/Renata
Singapore Open	(Brazil) Talita/Renata	(China) Tian/Wang	(China) Xue/Zhang
Seoul Open	(Australia) Cook/Barnett	(China) Tian/Wang	(Brazil) Juliana/Larissa
Warsaw Open	(Brazil) Juliana/Larissa	(Brazil) Adriana Behar/Shelda	(China) Xue/Zhang
Espinho Open	(Brazil) Juliana/Larissa	(Germany) Goller/Ludwig	(Brazil) Talita/Renata
Henkel Grand Slam	(United States) May-Treanor/Walsh	(China) Tian/Wang	(United States) Turner/Wacholder
ConocoPhilips Grand Slam	(United States) Boss/Ross	(China) Tian/Wang	(United States) May-Treanor/Walsh
Montreal Open	(United States) May-Treanor/Walsh	(China) Xue/Zhang	(Brazil) Adriana Behar/Shelda
Smart Grand Slam	(United States) May-Treanor/Walsh	(Brazil) Juliana/Larissa	(China) Tian/Wang
World Series 13	(Brazil) Talita/Renata	(China) Xue/Zhang	(China) Tian/Wang
SWATCH FIVB; World Championship powered by 1 to 1 Energy	(United States) May-Treanor/Walsh	(China) Tian/Wang	(Brazil) Juliana/Larissa
A1 Grand Slam presented by NOKIA	(United States) May-Treanor/Walsh	(Brazil) Juliana-Larissa	(Germany) Goller/Ludwig
Otera Open	(Brazil) Juliana/Larissa	(China) Xue/Zhang	(China) Tian/Wang
PAF Open	(Brazil) Juliana/Larissa	(China) Tian/Wang	(China) Xue/Zhang
St. Petersburg Open	(Brazil) Juliana/Larissa	(United States) Boss/Ross	(United States) Branagh/Youngs
Brazil Open	(United States) May-Treanor/Walsh	(Brazil) Juliana/Larissa	(United States) Branagh/Youngs
Phuket Thailand Open	(United States) May-Treanor/Walsh	(United States) Branagh/Youngs	(China) Tian/Wang

=== Men ===
Event	Gold	Silver	Bronze
China Shanghai Jinshan Open	(Brazil) Harley/Salgado	(Brazil) Marcio Araujo/Fabio	(Switzerland) Heuscher/Heyer
Bahrain Open	(Netherlands) Nummerdor/Schuil	(Brazil) Cunha/Franco	(Brazil) Harley/Salgado
Italian Open presented by Abruzzo	(Brazil) Marcio Araujo/Fabio	(Brazil) Emanuel/Ricardo	(Russia) Barsouk/Kolodinsky
VIP Open	(Estonia) Kais/Vesik	(Switzerland) Heuscher/Heyer	(Russia) Barsouk/Kolodinsky
Espinho Open	(Brazil) Emanuel/Ricardo	(Brazil) Cunha/Franco	(Brazil) Marcio Araujo/Fabio
Henkel Grand Slam	(Brazil) Emanuel/Ricardo	(Brazil) Cunha/Franco	(United States) Lambert/Metzger
ConocoPhilips Grand Slam	(Brazil) Marcio Araujo/Fabio	(Netherlands) Nummerdor/Schuil	(China) Wu/Xu
Montreal Open	(Brazil) Emanuel/Ricardo	(Australia) Schacht/Slack	(Brazil) Harley/Salgado
Smart Grand Slam	(Brazil) Marcio Araujo/Fabio	(Germany) Klemperer/Koreng	(United States) Dalhausser/Rogers
World Series 13	(Brazil) Cunha/Franco	(Argentina) Baracetti/Conde	(Russia) Barsouk/Kolodinsky
SWATCH FIVB; World Championship powered by 1 to 1 Energy	(United States) Dalhausser/Rogers	(Russia) Barsouk/Kolodinsky	(Australia) Schacht/Slack
A1 Grand Slam presented by NOKIA	(Brazil) Emanuel/Ricardo	(Germany) Klemperer/Koreng	(Netherlands) Nummerdor/Schuil
Otera Open	(Brazil) Emanuel/Ricardo	(Germany) Reckermann/Urbatzka	(Brazil) Marcio Araujo/Fabio
PAF Open	(Brazil) Harley/Salgado	(Germany) Reckermann/Urbatzka	(Austria) Gosch/Horst
St. Petersburg Open	(Brazil) Harley/Salgado	(Russia) Barsouk/Kolodinsky	(Brazil) Marcio Araujo/Fabio
Mazuri Open presented by Hotel Anders	(Brazil) Emanuel/Ricardo	(Argentina) Baracetti/Conde	(Brazil) Marcio Araujo/Fabio
Brazil Open	(Brazil) Emanuel/Ricardo	(United States) Dalhausser/Rogers	(Brazil) Marcio Araujo/Fabio

== Medal table by country ==
Rank	Nation	Gold	Silver	Bronze	Total
1	Brazil (BRA)	21	9	12	42
2	United States (USA)	9	3	6	18
3	China (CHN)	1	9	8	18
4	Australia (AUS)	1	1	1	3
4	Netherlands (NED)	1	1	1	3
6	Estonia (EST)	1	0	0	1
7	Germany (GER)	0	5	1	6
8	Russia (RUS)	0	2	3	5
9	Argentina (ARG)	0	2	0	2
10	Switzerland (SUI)	0	1	1	2
11	Norway (NOR)	0	1	0	1
12	Austria (AUT)	0	0	1	1
Totals (12 entries)		34	34	34	102

== Award winners ==
=== Men's Points Champions ===
MEN'S SWATCH-FIVB WORLD TOUR POINTS CHAMPIONS 2007
2007	Emanuel Rego and Ricardo Santos (BRA)

=== Women’s Points Champions ===
WOMEN'S SWATCH-FIVB WORLD TOUR POINTS CHAMPIONS 2007
2007	Larissa França and Juliana Felisberta (BRA)

=== Men's Award Winners ===
"BEST BLOCKER"
2007	Phil Dalhausser (USA)
"BEST DEFENSIVE PLAYER"
2007	Todd Rogers (USA)
"BEST HITTER"
2007	Phil Dalhausser (USA)
"BEST OFFENSIVE PLAYER"
2007	Ricardo Santos (BRA)
"BEST SERVER"
2007	Igor Kolodinsky (RUS)
"BEST SETTER"
2007	Marcio Araujo (BRA)

"MOST IMPROVED PLAYER"
2007	Xu Linyin (CHN); Dmitri Barsouk (RUS)
"MOST INSPIRATIONAL"
2007	Franco Neto (BRA)
"MOST OUTSTANDING"
2007	Ricardo Santos (BRA)
"SPORTSPERSON"
2007	Franco Neto (BRA)
"TEAM OF THE YEAR"
2007	Emanuel Rego (BRA); Ricardo Santos (BRA)
"TOP ROOKIE"
2007	Igor Kolodinsky (RUS)

=== Women's Award Winners ===
"BEST BLOCKER"
2007	Kerri Walsh (USA)
"BEST DEFENSIVE PLAYER"
2007	Misty May-Treanor (USA)
"BEST HITTER"
2007	Kerri Walsh (USA)
"BEST OFFENSIVE PLAYER"
2007	Kerri Walsh (USA); Misty May-Treanor (USA)
"BEST SERVER"
2007	Ana Paula Connelly (BRA)
"BEST SETTER"
2007	Larissa França (BRA)

"MOST IMPROVED PLAYER"
2007	Laura Ludwig (GER); Tamsin Barnett (AUS)
"MOST INSPIRATIONAL"
2007	Shelda Bede (BRA)
"MOST OUTSTANDING"
2007	Kerri Walsh (USA)
"SPORTSPERSON"
2007	Kerri Walsh (USA); Misty May-Treanor (USA)
"TEAM OF THE YEAR"
2007	Larissa França (BRA); Juliana Felisberta (BRA)
"TOP ROOKIE"
2007	April Ross (USA)

=== SWATCH Most Outstanding Player ===
For each tournament, there is selected one MOP (Most Outstanding Player)

==== Men ====
- Ricardo Santos (BRA)
  - Montreal Open
  - A1 Grand Slam presented by NOKIA
  - Otera Open
  - Mazuri Open presented by Hotel Anders
- Emanuel Rego (BRA)
  - Italian Open presented by Abruzzo
  - Espinho Open
  - Brazil Open
- Franco Neto (BRA)
  - Henkel Grand Slam
  - World Series 13
- Kristjan Kais (EST) - VIP Open
- David Klemperer (GER) - Smart Grand Slam
- Igor Kolodinsky (RUS) - St. Petersburg Open
- Fabio Luiz Magalhães (BRA) - ConocoPhilips Grand Slam
- Reinder Nummerdor (NED) - Bahrain Open
- Todd Rogers (USA) - SWATCH FIVB World Championship powered by 1 to 1 Energy
- Pedro Solberg Salgado (BRA) - PAF Open
- Harley Marques Silva (BRA) - China Shanghai Jinshan Open
