= Stephanie Pohl =

Stephanie Pohl may refer to:

- Stephanie Pohl (beach volleyball) (born 1978), German beach volleyball player
- Stephanie Pohl (cyclist) (born 1987), German cyclist
