= Marrit Leenstra =

Marrit Leenstra may refer to:

- Marrit Leenstra (volleyball) (born 1973), Dutch Olympic volleyball and beach volleyball player
- Marrit Leenstra (speed skater) (born 1989), Dutch long track speed skater
