= Stanislav Eremin (volleyball) =

Russian volleyball player (born 1985)

Personal information
- Full name: Stanislav Eremin
- Nationality: Russian
- Born: June 23, 1985 (age 41); Russia
- Height: 1.97 m (6 ft 6 in)
- Weight: 94 kg (207 lb)
- Spike: 340 cm (134 in)
- Block: 320 cm (126 in)

Volleyball information
- Position: Outside hitter
- Current club: Dinamo LO

Career
Years	Teams
2003–2004; 2008–2009; 2009–2010; 2011–2014; 2014–2017; 2017–	CSKA Moscow; Ural Ufa; Dinamo-Yantar Kaliningrad; Dinamo Krasnodar; Lokomotiv Novosibirsk; Dinamo LO

National team
Russia
- Last updated: 31 December 2017

Stanislav Eremin (born 23 June 1985) is a Russian volleyball player, a member of Russia men's national volleyball team and Russian club Dinamo LO.

== Career ==
Since 2014 he has been playing in Lokomotiv Novosibirsk. In April 2015 he extended his contract.
