= Debora Schoon-Kadijk =

Dutch beach volleyball player (born 1969)

Personal information
- Nationality: Dutch
- Born: 14 April 1969 (age 57); Rotterdam, South Holland, Netherlands
Honours
Women's beach volleyball
Representing the Netherlands
European Championships
Silver medal – second place	1998 Rhodes	Beach
Bronze medal – third place	2000 Bilbao	Beach

Debora Schoon-Kadijk (born 14 April 1969 in Rotterdam, South Holland) is a former professional beach volleyball player from the Netherlands. She twice represented her native country at the Summer Olympics, in 1996 and 2000. Partnering her sister Rebekka Kadijk she claimed the bronze medal at the 2000 European Championships in Bilbao, Spain, after having won silver two years earlier on Rhodes.

== Playing partners ==
- Rebekka Kadijk
- Mareille te Winkel
- Lisette van de Ven
