= Renata Ribeiro =

Brazilian beach volleyball player (born 1981)

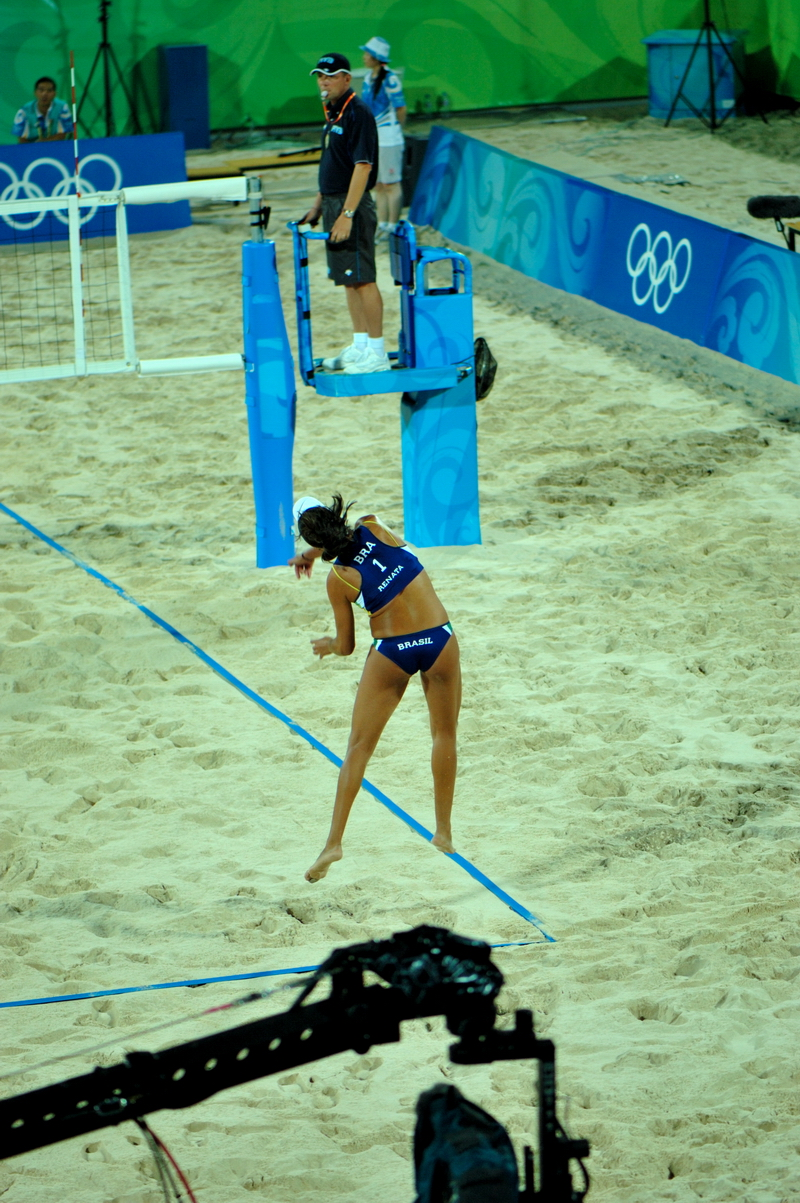
- Ribeiro at the 2008 Olympics, Quarterfinals.

Personal information
- Born: December 7, 1981 (age 44); Brazil
- Hometown: Rio de Janeiro, Brazil
- Height: 176 cm (5 ft 9 in)

Beach volleyball information

Current teammate
Teammate
Talita Antunes

Previous teammates
Teammate
Rejane Secches
Shaylyn Bede
Talita Antunes da Rocha
Vanilda Leão
Honours
Women's beach volleyball
Representing Brazil
World Tour
Gold medal – first place	2005 Athens	Beach
Gold medal – first place	2005 Bali	Beach
Gold medal – first place	2007 Sentosa	Beach
Gold medal – first place	2007 Marseille	Beach
Gold medal – first place	2008 Shanghai	Beach
Silver medal – second place	2005 St. Petersburg	Beach
Silver medal – second place	2005 Montreal	Beach
Silver medal – second place	2006 Porto Santo	Beach
Silver medal – second place	2006 Acapulco	Beach
Silver medal – second place	2008 Adelaide	Beach
Silver medal – second place	2008 Barcelona	Beach
Silver medal – second place	2009 Moscow	Beach
Bronze medal – third place	2007 Shanghai	Beach
Bronze medal – third place	2007 Espinho	Beach
Bronze medal – third place	2009 Seoul	Beach

Renata Ribeiro (born December 7, 1981) is a Brazilian beach volleyball player.

Ribeiro and teammate Talita Antunes represented Brazil at the 2008 Summer Olympics in Beijing, China.
