= Marrit Leenstra (volleyball) =

Personal information
- Nationality: Dutch
- Born: 18 October 1973 (age 53); Emmen, Netherlands
- Hometown: Amsterdam, Netherlands
- Height: 1.79 m (5 ft 10 in)
- Weight: 68 kg (150 lb)

Beach volleyball information

Current teammate
| Years | Teammate | Tours (points) |
|---|---|---|
| 2005–present | Sanne Keizer | 26 (1569) |

Previous teammates
| Years | Teammate | Tours (points) |
|---|---|---|
| 2001–2004 | Rebekka Kadijk | 42 (2923) |

Best results
| Years | Location | Result |
|---|---|---|
| 2001, 2002, 2004; 2003 | Dutch nationals Lianyungang World Cup | 1st 1st |
Honours
Women's volleyball
Representing Netherlands
European Championships
| Gold medal – first place | 1995 Arnhem | Team competition |
Women's beach volleyball
European Championships
| Silver medal – second place | 2002 Basel | with Rebekka Kadijk |
- Last updated: 6 September 2006

Marrit Leenstra (born 18 October 1973) is a Dutch professional beach volleyball and indoor volleyball player born in Emmen, Drenthe.

Leenstra started her career in 1983 playing indoor volleyball for OSV Pegasus Ter Apel. She also played for Etiflex Ommen, Martinus Amstelveen, Vini Monteschiavo Jesi, Granzotto San Dona, Fiqurella Firenze and Mirabi Iandia Teodora Ravenna. From 1988 to 1992 she was part of Dutch youth teams. In 1992 she joined the Dutch senior volleyball team and was selected for the 1992 Summer Olympics in Barcelona, finishing sixth. Four years later, during the 1996 Summer Olympics she and her team finished fifth. Leenstra remained in the Dutch team until 1998.

After finishing her indoor contract in Italy, she started her international beach volleyball career. She teamed up with Dutch star Rebekka Kadijk, whose sister Debora decided to quit beach volleyball after the 2000 Summer Olympics. In 2001, 2002 and 2004, Kadijk and Leenstra won three Dutch national titles. In Basel 2002 they reached the final of the European Championships. They lost this final, but still won a silver medal. Their main achievement was made in 2003 when they won the World Cup meeting in Lianyungang (China). They qualified for the 2004 Summer Olympics. After the Olympics they decided to part ways. Leenstra's next partner was Sanne Keizer with whom she did not reach any notable results, except a fourth place at a tournament in Montreal.

Awards
| Preceded by Marjolein de Jong | Amsterdam Sportswoman of the Year; 2003 | Succeeded by Marleen Veldhuis |
