= Nestea European Championship Tour =

European beach volleyball tour

Tournament information
- Sport: Beach volleyball
- Location: Europe
- Dates: April 17–20–September 19–21 (2008)
- Established: 2003
- Number of tournaments: 6

The Nestea European Championship Tour (or the European Beach Volleyball Tour) is a European beach volleyball tour organised by the European Volleyball Confederation (CEV). It is the highest ranked European series of beach volleyball tournaments.

The tour was previously known as the European Championship Tour, before the CEV 2003 signed a sponsorship deal with Nestea in 2003.

== Categories ==
The European Tour consists of Satellite and Masters events, culminating with the European Beach Volleyball Championships. From the 2018 season onwards, the Satellite and Masters events have been merged into the FIVB World Tour, but are still organised by the CEV.

=== Challenger and Satellite ===
The Challenger and Satellite events are a series of grassroots tournaments that serve as a developmental circuit for the FIVB World Tour. These tournaments award less prize money (€4,000–15,000) and FIVB ranking points than Masters events. The Challenger and Satellite circuit was previously organised by the FIVB, who handed over the organising of these events to the continental volleyball confederations in 2009.

=== Masters ===
In the 2017 season, Masters events awarded €25,000 in prize money per gender with a 12–16 team main draw.

== Medal table by country ==
Medal table as of September 3, 2008. This includes the results of every tournament, since the tour began in 2003.

Position	Country	Gold	Silver	Bronze	Total
1.	Germany	22	16	12	50
2.	Netherlands	8	8	10	26
3.	Greece	8	2	1	11
4.	Switzerland	7	7	8	23
5.	Czech Republic	4	4	4	12
6.	Austria	3	4	2	9
7.	Italy	2	1	5	8
8.	Spain	2	1		3
9.	Russia	1	1	1	3
10.	Lithuania	1			1
11.	Norway		7	6	13
12.	Estonia		3	2	5
13.	Slovenia		1	1	2
14.	France		1		1
14.	Latvia		1		1
14.	Croatia		1		1
17.	Poland			1	1
17.	Finland			1	1
17.	Ukraine			1	1
17.	Bulgaria			1	1

== See also ==
- Beach Volleyball World Tour
