= David Klemperer =

German beach volleyball player (born 1980)

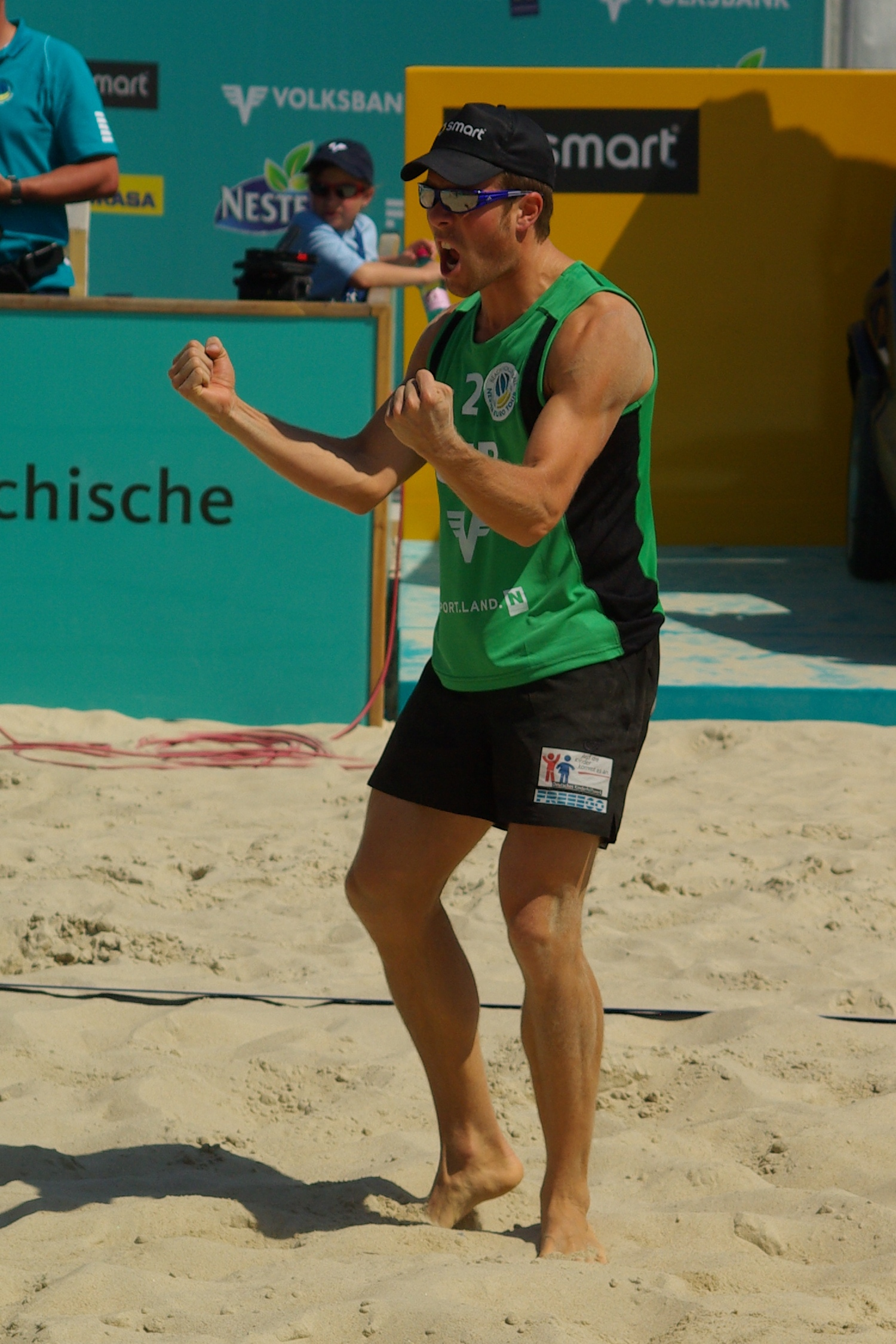

Personal information
- Born: 22 June 1980 (age 46); Germany
- Height: 188 cm (6 ft 2 in)

Beach volleyball information

Current teammate
Teammate
Eric Koreng

Previous teammates
Teammate	Tours (points)
Niklas Rademacher; Kjell Schneider; Stefan Hübner	40 (1343); 12 (1735); 1 (8)
Honours
Men's beach volleyball
Representing Germany
Swatch FIVB World Tour
Silver medal – second place	2007 Smart Grand Slam	Beach
Silver medal – second place	2007 A1 Grand Slam	Beach
Bronze medal – third place	2008 Henkel Grand Chelem	Beach
Bronze medal – third place	2008 Moscow Grand Slam	Beach
European Championships
Bronze medal – third place	2007 Valencia	Beach

David Klemperer (born 22 June 1980) is a beach volleyball player from Germany, who represented his native country in the 2008 Olympics in Beijing, China with Eric Koreng.
