= Dmitri Barsuk =

Russian beach volleyball player

Dmitry Barsuk
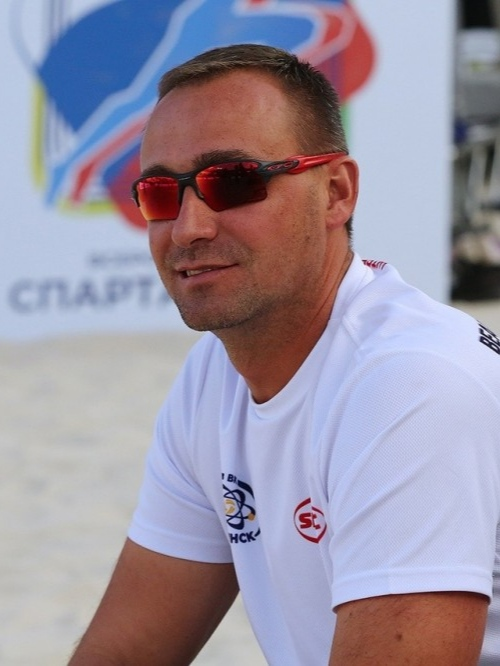
- Barsuk in 2023

Personal information
- Born: January 20, 1980 (age 46); Armavir, Russia
- Height: 190 cm (6 ft 3 in)

Beach volleyball information

Current teammate
Teammate
Igor Kolodinsky

Previous teammates
Teammate	Tours (points)
Roman Arkaev; Vladimir Kostioukov; Denis Tenenbaum; Dmitry Karasev; Mikhail Kouchnerev; Alexei Taratine	45 (2666.5); 5 (50); 5 (42); 2 (35); 2 (30); 1 (10)
Honours
Men's beach volleyball
Representing Russia
World Championships
Silver medal – second place	2007 Gstaad	Team
European Championships
Bronze medal – third place	2008 Hamburg	Team
European Games
Silver medal – second place	2015 Baku	Team
World Tour
Bronze medal – third place	2007 Roseto degli Abruzzi	Team
Bronze medal – third place	2007 Zagreb	Team
Bronze medal – third place	2007 Marseille	Team
Silver medal – second place	2007 St. Petersburg	Team
Silver medal – second place	2008 Barcelona	Team
Gold medal – first place	2008 Klagenfurt	Team

Dmitry Nikolayevich Barsuk (Russian: Дмитрий Николаевич Барсук; born 20 January 1980) is a Russian beach volleyball player. He made an Olympic debut at the 2008 Summer Olympics in Beijing, China.

In August 2008 Barsuk and team mate Igor Kolodinsky won their first Swatch FIVB World Tour gold medal at the A1 Beach Volleyball Grand Slam in Klagenfurt, Austria.

== Sponsors ==
- Swatch

Awards
Preceded by Phil Dalhausser (USA)	Men's FIVB Beach World Tour "Most Improved"; 2007	Succeeded by Andy Cès (FRA)
