= Igor Kolodinsky =

Russian volleyball player

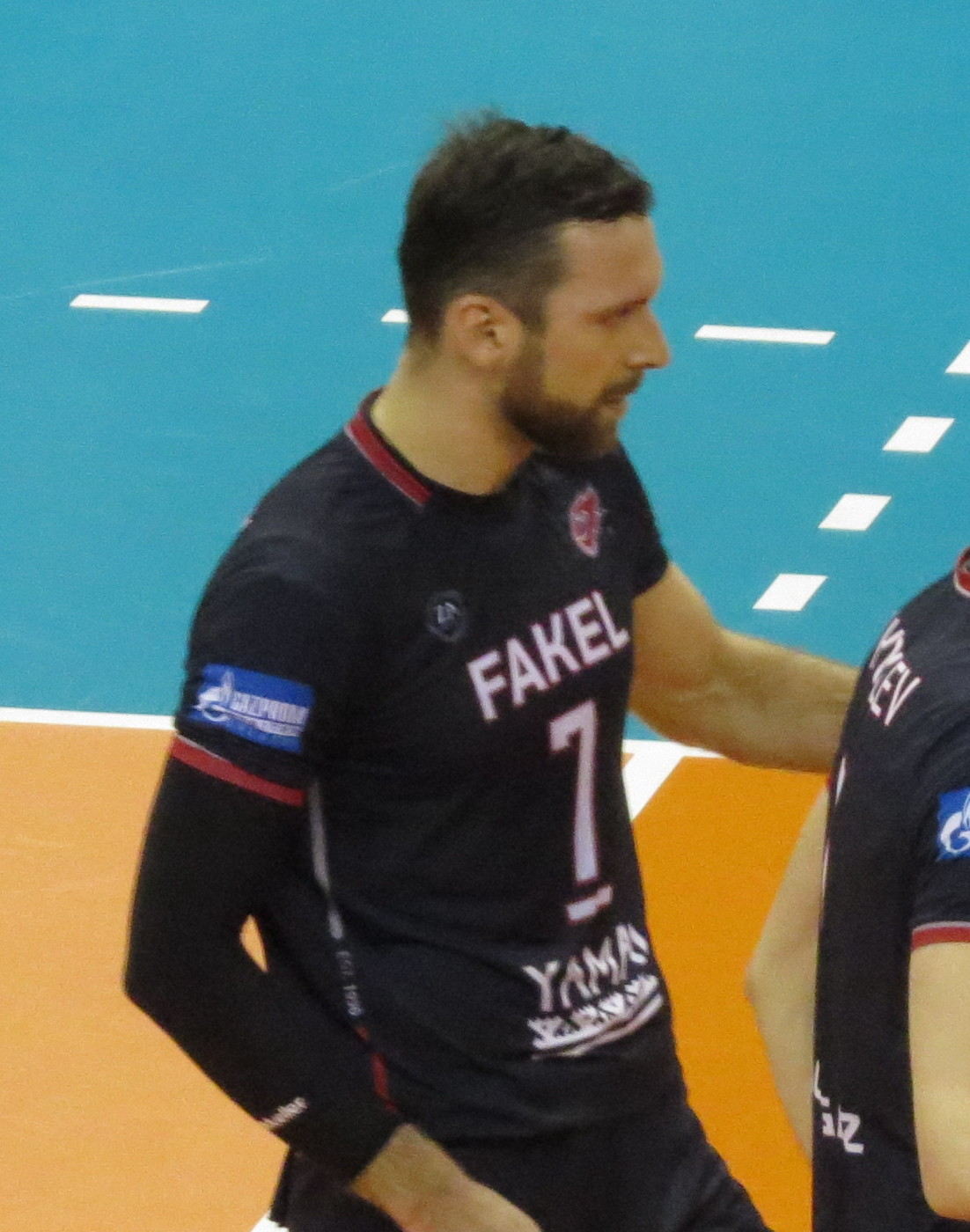
- Kolodinsky in 2017

Personal information
- Nationality: Russia
- Born: July 7, 1983 (age 43); Magdeburg, Germany
- Height: 198 cm (6 ft 6 in)

Beach volleyball information
Teammate	Tours (points)
Leonid Kalinine; Stanislav Eremin; Dmitry Karasev; Dmitri Barsouk	7 (379); 2 (16); 1 (20)
Honours
Men's beach volleyball
Representing Russia
World Championships
Silver medal – second place	2007 Gstaad	Beach
European Championships
Bronze medal – third place	2008 Hamburg	Beach
World Tour
Bronze medal – third place	2007 Roseto degli Abruzzi	Beach
Bronze medal – third place	2007 Zagreb	Beach
Bronze medal – third place	2007 Marseille	Beach
Silver medal – second place	2007 St. Petersburg	Beach
Silver medal – second place	2008 Barcelona	Beach
Gold medal – first place	2008 Klagenfurt	Beach

Igor Georgiyevich Kolodinsky (Russian: Игорь Георгиевич Колодинский; born July 7, 1983) is a Russian male volleyball player and a former beach volleyball player. On club level he plays for Fakel Novy Urengoy.

He was born in Magdeburg, Germany, and competed for Russia at the 2008 Summer Olympics in Beijing, China in beach volleyball.

In August 2008 at the A1 Beach Volleyball Grand Slam presented by NOKIA in Klagenfurt, Austria, Kolodinsky and teammate Dmitri Barsouk won their first Swatch FIVB World Tour gold medal.

Kolodinsky currently (per August 2008) holds the records for the fastest serve in the Swatch FIVB World Tour history. He served at 114.0 km/h at the Italian Open presented by Abruzzo in Roseto degli Abruzzi, Italy.

Awards
Preceded by Iver Horrem (NOR)	Men's FIVB Beach World Tour "Best Server"; 2007–2010	Succeeded by Eric Koreng (GER)
Preceded by Sean Rosenthal (USA)	Men's FIVB World Tour "Top Rookie"; 2007	Succeeded by Adrián Gavira Collado (ESP)
