= Eric Koreng =

German beach volleyball player (born 1981)

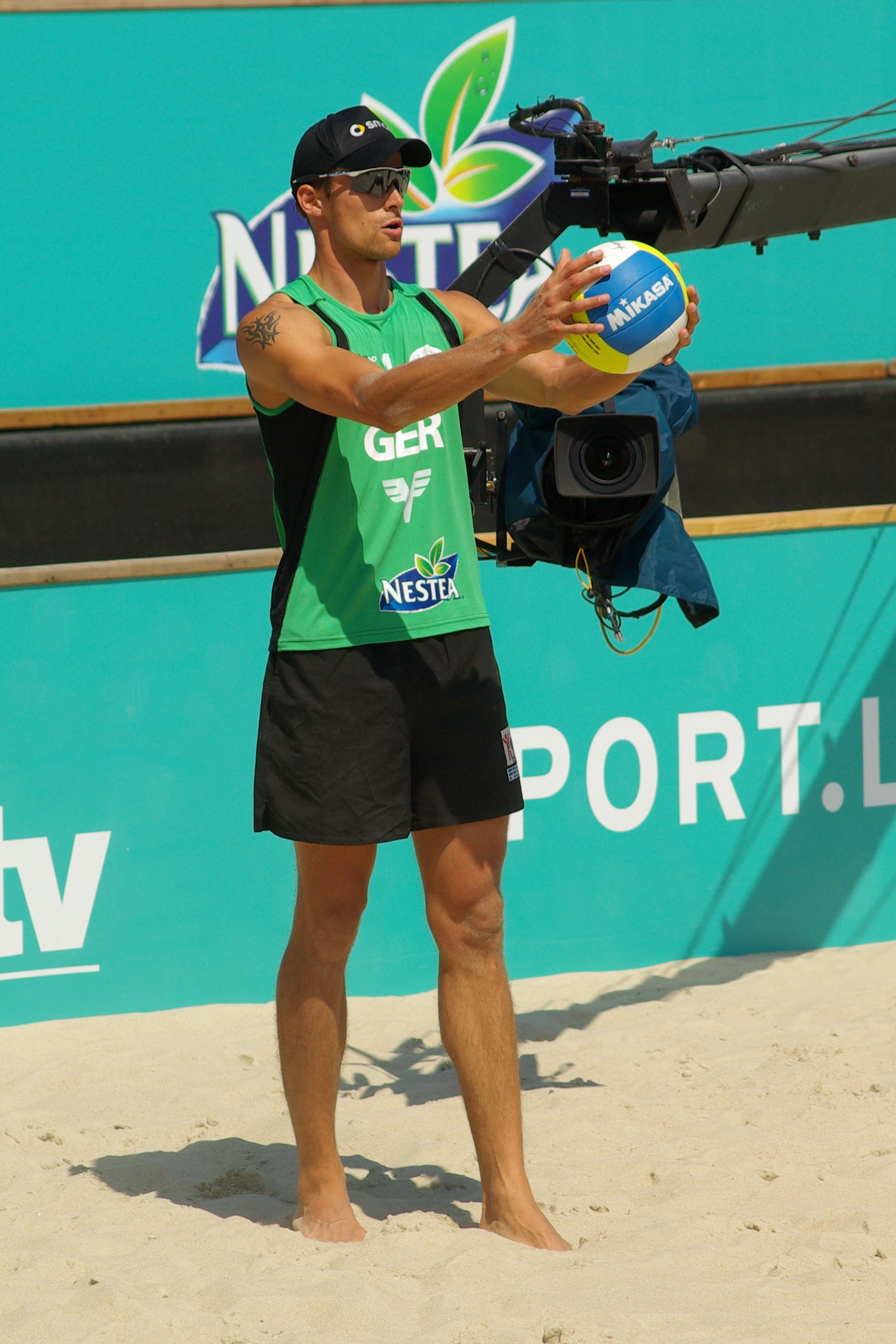

Personal information
- Nationality: German
- Born: 16 May 1981 (age 45); Stralsund, East Germany
- Height: 194 cm (6 ft 4 in)

Beach volleyball information

Current teammate
Teammate
David Klemperer

Previous teammates
Teammate	Tours (points)
Kay Matysik	14 (1248)
Honours
Men's beach volleyball
Representing Germany
Swatch FIVB World Tour
Silver medal – second place	2007 Smart Grand Slam	Beach
Silver medal – second place	2007 A1 Grand Slam	Beach
Bronze medal – third place	2008 Henkel Grand Chelem	Beach
Bronze medal – third place	2008 Moscow Grand Slam	Beach
European Championships
Bronze medal – third place	2007 Valencia	Beach

Eric Koreng (born 16 May 1981 in Stralsund, East Germany) is a beach volleyball player from Germany. Koreng and team mate David Klemperer represented Germany at the 2008 Summer Olympics in Beijing, China.

Awards
Preceded by Igor Kolodinsky (RUS)	Men's FIVB Beach World Tour "Best Server"; 2011–2012	Succeeded by Phil Dalhausser (USA)
