= Sara Goller =

German beach volleyball player

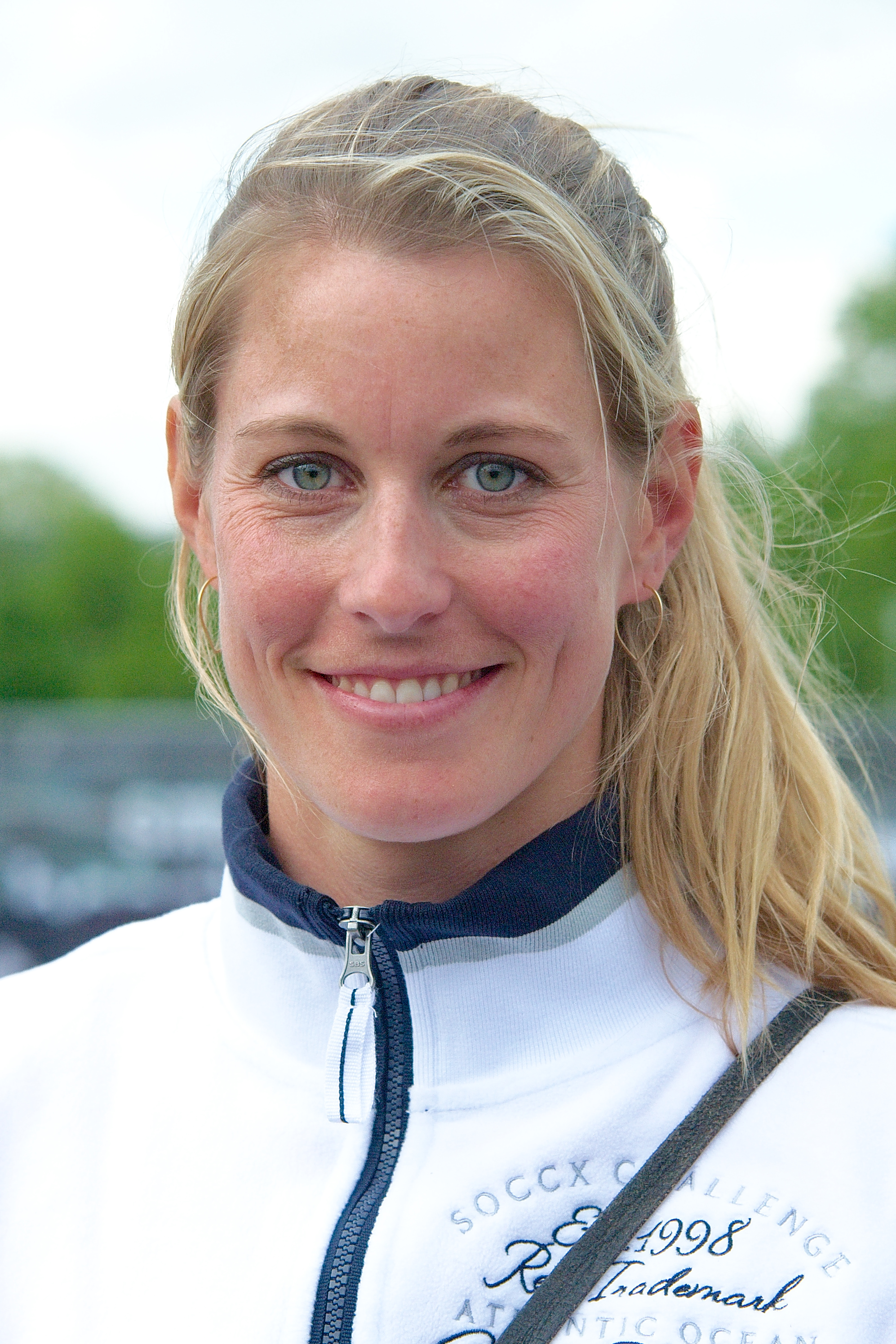
- Goller in 2015 at the Smart Beach Tour in Münster

Personal information
- Nationality: German
- Hometown: Starnberg

Beach volleyball information
Years	Teammate
2007-2012	Frederike Romberg; Laura Ludwig

National team
Germany
Honours
Women's volleyball
Representing Germany
European Championships
Gold medal – first place	2010 Berlin	Beach
Silver medal – second place	2009 Sotchi	Beach
Gold medal – first place	2008 Hamburg	Beach
Silver medal – second place	2007 Valencia	Beach

Sara Goller is a former professional German beach volleyball player.

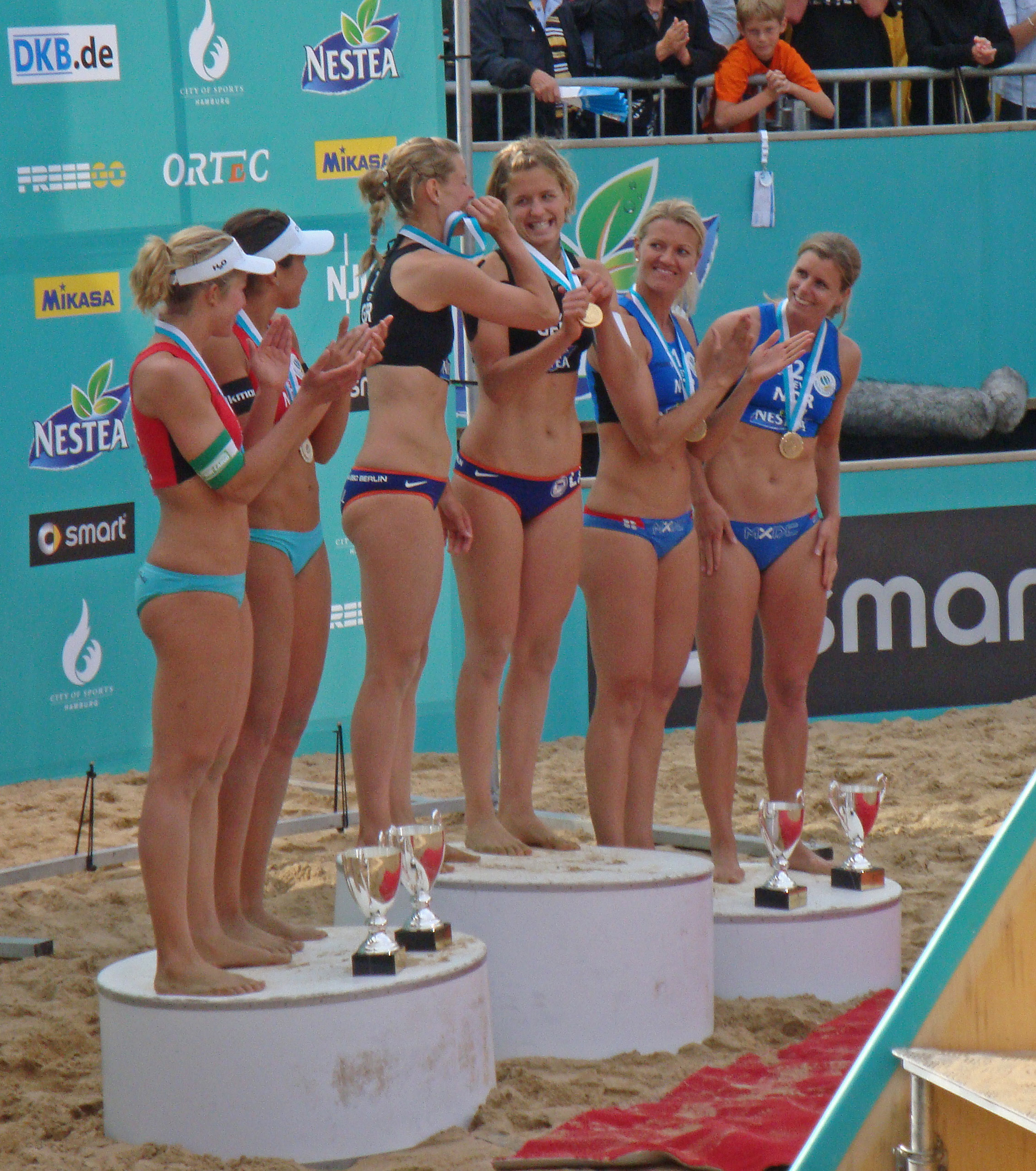
Sara Goller and Laura Ludwig, EM 2008 in Hamburg, Germany

Initially paired with Frederike Romberg, Goller won the U20 European Championships in Salzburg before changing to her current partner, Laura Ludwig. Together, Goller and Ludwig became 2006 German champions, won the U23 European Championships in St. Pölten and ended fourth in the women's European Championships the same year in The Hague. They continued their line of success in 2007, defending the German title and winning the silver medal in the European Championships in Valencia. Goller and Ludwig ended the 2007 season as leaders in the German women's ranking and are placed 7th overall.

She won 2 silver medals at the 2007 and 2009 European Beach Volleyball Championships and 2 golden medals at the 2008 and 2010 Beach ECH alongside her former teammate Laura Ludwig.

They competed at the 2008 and 2012 Summer Olympics, finishing in 9th place at the 2008 Olympics and reaching the quarterfinals in 2012.
