= Raúl Mesa =

Spanish beach volleyball player (born 1982)

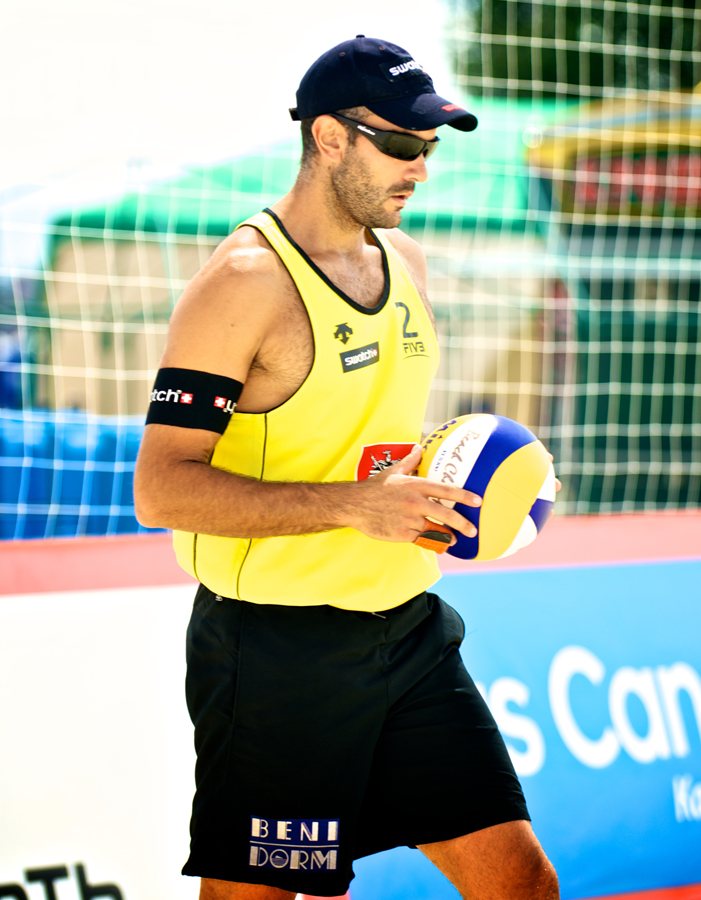

Personal information
- Born: 16 April 1982 (age 44); Zaragoza, Spain
- Height: 190 cm (6 ft 3 in)
Medal record
Men's beach volleyball
Representing Spain
European Championships
Gold medal – first place	2005 Moscow	Beach

Raúl Mesa (born 16 April 1982 in Zaragoza) is a male beach volleyball player from Spain who won the gold medal at the 2005 European Championships in Moscow, Russia, partnering with Pablo Herrera. He competed at the 2008 Summer Olympics.

== Playing partners ==
- Pablo Herrera
- Javier Luna
- Javier Bosma
- Manuel Carrasco
- Francisco Rodriguez
- Sergio Martin
