= Merel Mooren =

Dutch beach volleyball player

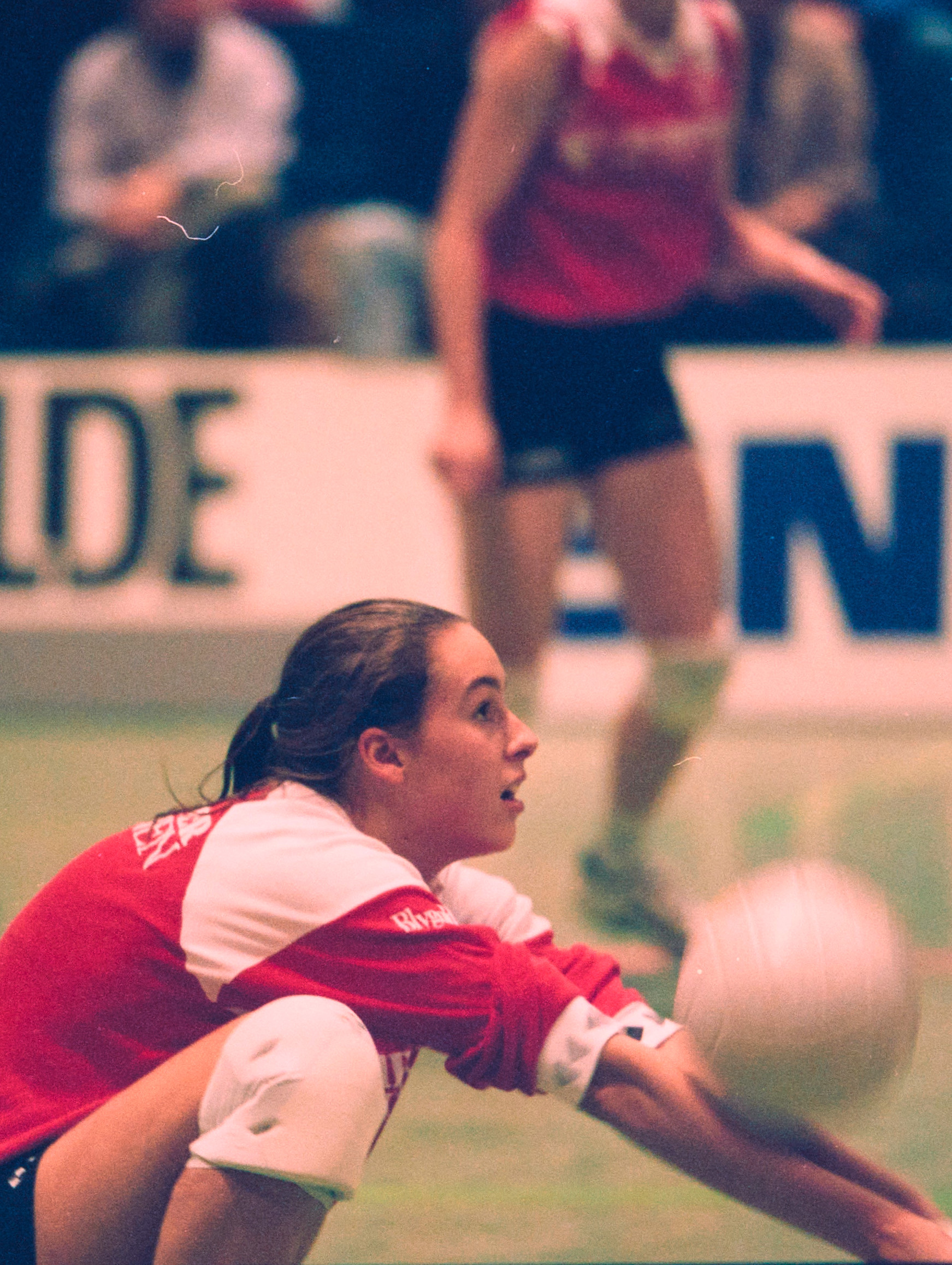

Personal information
- Full name: Merel Else Mooren
- Born: 22 September 1982 (age 44); Haarlem, The Netherlands
- Hometown: Amstelveen, The Netherlands
- Height: 1.86 m (6 ft 1 in)
- Weight: 70 kg (154 lb)

Beach volleyball information

Current teammate
Years	Teammate	Tours (points)
2005-present	Rebekka Kadijk	21 (2246)

Previous teammates
Years	Teammate	Tours (points)
2002-2002; 2003-2004	Mered de Vries; Sanne Keizer	2 (4); 18 (260)

Best results
Years	Location	Result
2003, 2005, 2006; 2004	Dutch nationals Lausanne Satellite	1st 1st
Honours
Women's beach volleyball
Representing Netherlands
European Championships
Silver medal – second place	2005 Moscow	Kadijk
Silver medal – second place	2006 Scheveningen	Kadijk
- Last updated: 6 September 2006

Merel Else Mooren (born 22 September 1982) is a Dutch professional beach volleyball and indoor volleyball player born in Haarlem.

In indoor volleyball Mooren started her career in 1989 at Allides Haarlem where she was part of the youth teams. The Dutch youth team called her up in 1996 and she was part of the team until 2000, winning a silver medal at the European Youth Championships. From 1997 until 2002 she played for Martinus Amstelveen in the highest Dutch league. Then she decided to switch sports to beach volleyball.

She started her international beach volleyball career in 2002, teaming up with Mered de Vries. The talented team did not last long and in the following year Mooren had a new partner called Sanne Keizer. They quickly became one of the best teams in The Netherlands. They even became Dutch champions by breaking the run set by Rebekka Kadijk who was teaming up with Marrit Leenstra at that time. In 2004 they finished second behind this team, but they won the FIVB Satellite tournament in Lausanne. After the 2004 Summer Olympics Kadijk/Leenstra decided to split up. Mooren was Kadijk's next partner, while Leenstra continued with Sanne Keizer. The combination Kadijk/Mooren was nearly unbeatable in their own country. In 2005 and 2006 they became Dutch national champions. In both 2005 (Moscow) and 2006 (Scheveningen) they reached the final of the European Championships. In both occasions the final was lost and they won the silver medals twice. In 2007 they won their first European Tour Tournament, prevailing in the final of the German Masters in Hamburg.
