= Rebekka Kadijk =

Dutch volleyball and beach volleyball player (born 1979)

Personal information
- Full name: Rebekka de Kogel-Kadijk
- Born: 16 June 1979 (age 47); Werkendam, The Netherlands
- Hometown: Rotterdam, The Netherlands
- Height: 1.75 m (5 ft 9 in)
- Weight: 68 kg (150 lb)

Beach volleyball information

Current teammate
Years	Teammate	Tours (points)
2005-Present	Merel Mooren	21 (2246)

Previous teammates
Years	Teammate	Tours (points)
1997–2000; 2000; 2001–2004	Debora Schoon-Kadijk; Marieke Veldhuizen; Marrit Leenstra	28 (1625); 1 (17); 42 (2923)

Best results
Years	Location	Result
1997–2002, 2004–2006; 2003	Dutch nationals Lianyungang World Cup	1st 1st
Honours
Women's beach volleyball
Representing the Netherlands
European Championships
Silver medal – second place	1998 Rhodes	Beach
Bronze medal – third place	2000 Bilbao	Beach
Silver medal – second place	2002 Basel	Beach
Silver medal – second place	2005 Moscow	Beach
Silver medal – second place	2006 Scheveningen	Beach
- Last updated: 6 September 2006

Rebekka de Kogel-Kadijk (born 16 June 1979) is a Dutch professional beach volleyball and indoor volleyball player born in Werkendam.

In indoor volleyball Kadijk started her career in 1992 at Foranto Werkendam. Other teams she played for were Sliedrecht Sport, Cornix Schelle (Belgium) and AMVJ. She was also part of the Dutch youth team in 1995. She quit indoor volleyball in 2001 to fully concentrate on beach volleyball.

She started her international beach volleyball career in 1997, playing tournaments around the world with her sister Debora. Between 1997 and 2000 they were Dutch national champions. They won the silver medal at the European Championships in Rhodes 1998 followed by a bronze medal in 2000. They also participated at the 2000 Summer Olympics, where they lost both of their matches, eliminated in the second preliminary round by Lina and Petia Yanchulova, also sisters. Following the Olympic tournament Debora quit volleyball. Rebekka continued to play and found a new partner in Marrit Leenstra. In 2001, 2002 and 2004 another three Dutch national titles were won. In Basel 2002 Kadijk/Leenstra reached the final of the European Championships. They lost this final, earning a silver medal. Their main achievement came in 2003 when they won the World Cup meeting in Lianyungang (China). They qualified for the 2004 Summer Olympics, but met little success there. After the Olympics they split up. Kadijk's next partner was Merel Mooren and, like Rebekka's earlier teams, Kadijk/Mooren were nearly unbeatable in their own country. In 2005 and 2006 they became Dutch national champions. In both 2005 (Moscow) and 2006 (Scheveningen) they reached the final of the European Championships. They lost on both occasions, earning two more silver medals. In 2007 they won the final of the German Masters in Hamburg, their first European Tour Tournament win.
