= Vassiliki Arvaniti =

Greek beach volleyball player (born 1985)

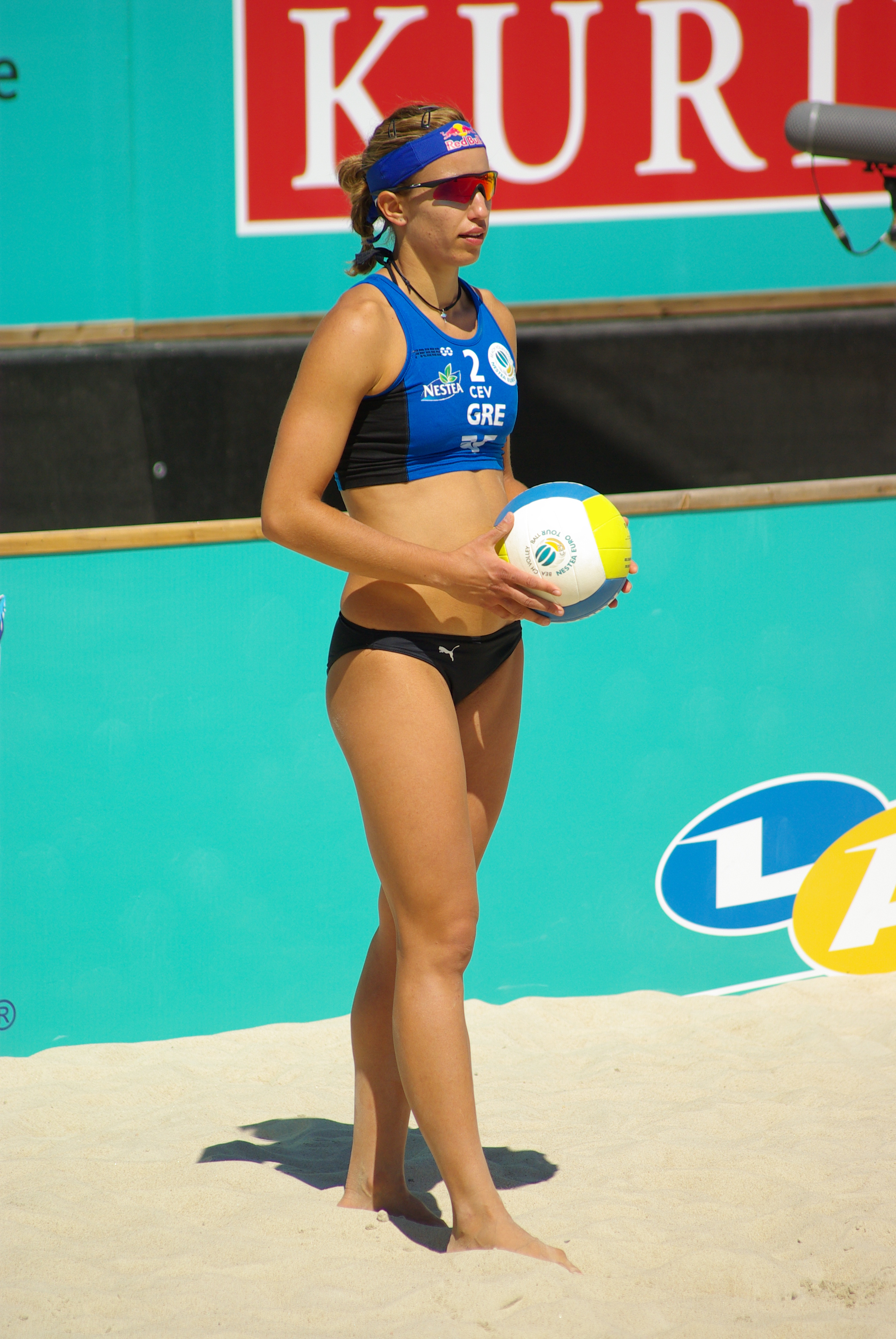
- Vasiliki Arvaniti at Austrian Masters 2008

Medal record

Women's volleyball

Representing Greece

European Championships
Gold medal – first place	2005 Moscow	Beach
Gold medal – first place	2007 Valencia	Beach

Vassiliki "Viky" Arvaniti (Greek: Βασιλική (Βίκυ) Αρβανίτη), also transliterated Vasiliki; born March 17, 1985, in Athens, Greece) is a beach volleyball player from Greece, who won the gold medal at the 2005 European Championships in Moscow, Russia and the 2007 European Championship in Valencia, Spain, partnering Vasso Karadassiou. She represented her native country at the 2004 Summer Olympics in her home town, with Thaleia Koutroumanidou. At the 2008 Summer Olympics, she competed with Karadassiou. She took part in the 2012 London Olympics with Maria Tsiartsiani, who was later injured. Since 2013, her teammate has been Peny Karagkouni, who used to play indoor volleyball.

Awards
Preceded by Inaugural	Women's FIVB World Tour "Most Improved"; 2005	Succeeded by Leila Barros (BRA)
