= Vasso Karantasiou =

Greek beach volleyball player (born 1973)

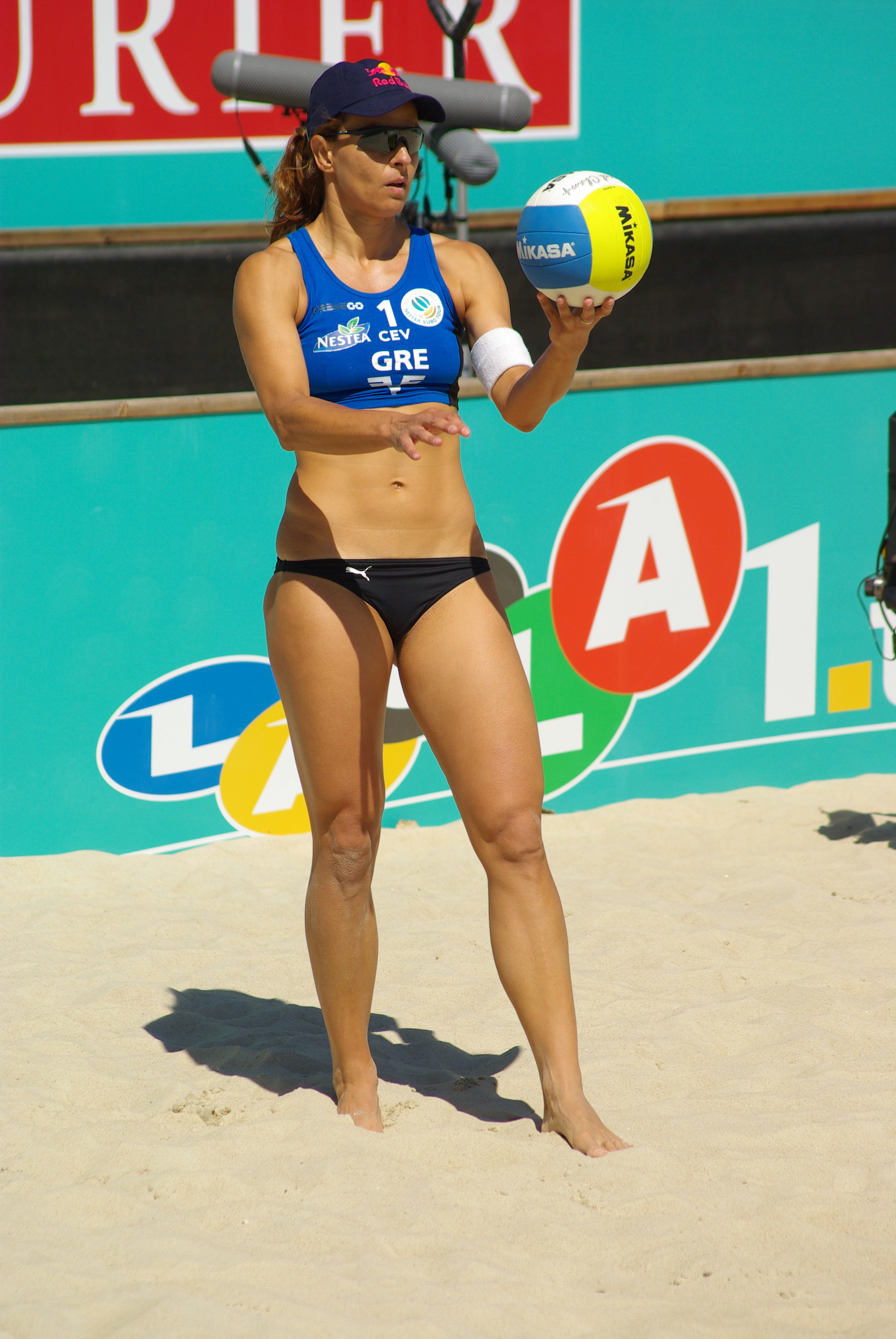
- Karadassiou at Austrian Masters 2008

Medal record

Women's volleyball

Representing Greece

European Championships
Gold medal – first place	2001 Jesolo	Beach
Gold medal – first place	2005 Moscow	Beach
Gold medal – first place	2007 Valencia	Beach

Vasiliki "Vasso" Karantasiou (Greek: Βασιλική (Βάσω) Καραντάσιου, also transliterated Karadassiou; born January 6, 1973) is a female beach volleyball player from Greece, who won the gold medal at the 2005 European Championships in Moscow, Russia, partnering Vassiliki Arvaniti.

She was born in Athens, Greece, and represented her native country at the 2004 Summer Olympics in her home city, after having competed at the 2000 Summer Olympics as well.

== Individual awards ==
- FIVB Top Women's Player 2005

== Playing partners ==
- Vassiliki Arvaniti
- Efthalia Koutroumanidou
- Efi Sfyri
- Stavroula Theodorou
- Rodi Ordoulidou

Awards
Preceded by Larissa França (BRA)	Women's FIVB World Tour "Best Setter" alongside (Brazil) Larissa França; 2008	Succeeded by Larissa França (BRA)
