= Okka Rau =

German beach volleyball player (born 1977)

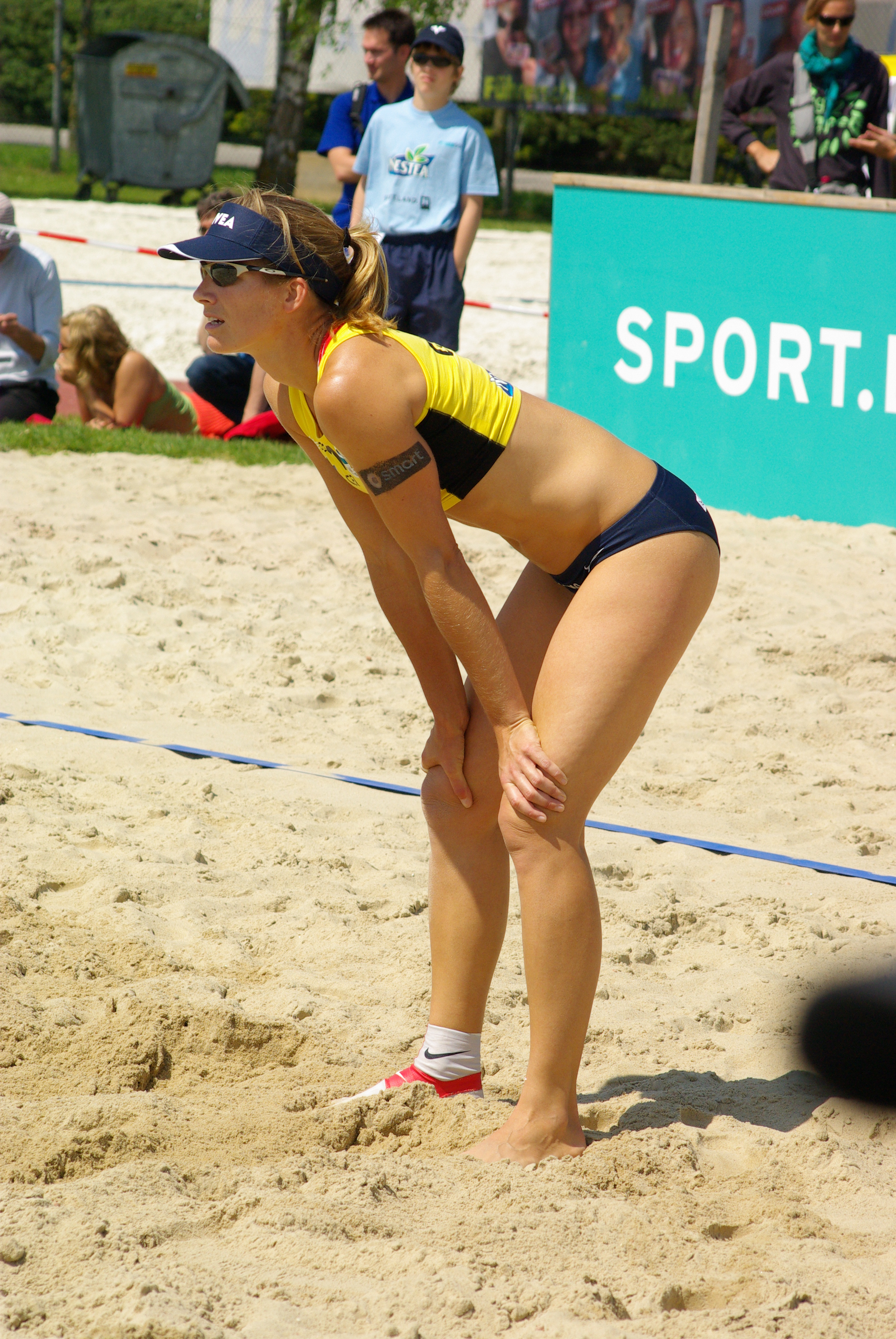

Medal record

Women's volleyball

Representing Germany

European Championships
Gold medal – first place	2003 Alanya	Beach
Bronze medal – third place	2005 Moscow	Beach

Okka Rau (born January 5, 1977, in Leer, Lower Saxony) is a former beach volleyball player from Germany. She won the gold medal at the 2003 European Championships in Alanya, partnering with Stephanie Pohl. She represented her native country at the 2004 Summer Olympics in Athens, Greece, and the 2008 Summer Olympics in Beijing, China.

Rau played volleyball with the club Hamburger SV in Hamburg, Germany.

== Playing partners ==
- Stephanie Pohl
- Mireya Kaup
