= Stephanie Pohl (beach volleyball) =

German beach volleyball player

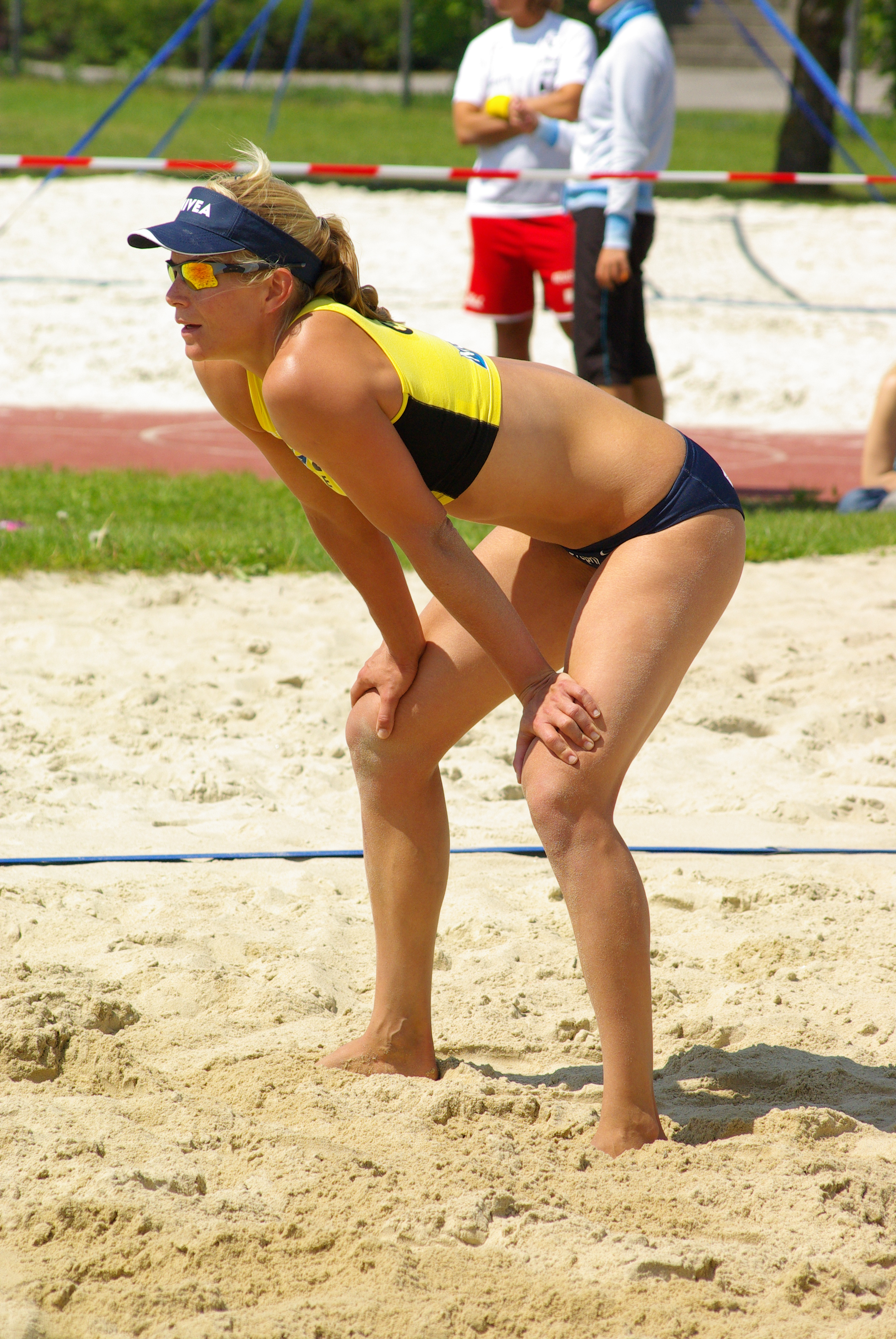
- Pohl in 2008

Personal information
- Born: 7 May 1978 (age 48); Finsterwalde, East Germany
- Height: 186 cm (6 ft 1 in)
Honours
Women's Beach volleyball
Representing Germany
European Championships
Gold medal – first place	2003 Alanya	Beach
Bronze medal – third place	2005 Moscow	Beach

Stephanie Pohl (born 7 May 1978) is a retired German beach volleyball player. She won the gold medal at the 2003 European Championships in Alanya, partnering Okka Rau. She represented her native country at both the 2004 Summer Olympics in Athens and the 2008 Summer Olympics in Beijing.

== Playing partners ==
- Okka Rau
- Ines Pianka
