= Beach volleyball at the Asian Games =

- Governing bodies: FIVB (World) / AVC (Asia)
- Events: 2 (men: 1; women: 1)

Games
- 1951; 1954; 1958; 1962; 1966; 1970; 1974; 1978; 1982; 1986; 1990; 1994; 1998; 2002; 2006; 2010; 2014; 2018; 2022; 2026
- Medalists

Beach volleyball was introduced at the Asian Games in the 1998 edition and has been held at every edition since.

== Summary ==
=== Men ===
#	Year	Host	Final			Third place match			Teams
#	Year	Host	Winner	Score	Runner-up	3rd place	Score	4th place	Teams
1	1998	(Thailand); Bangkok	(China); Gu Hongyu; Li Hua	2–1	(Indonesia); Irilkhun Shofanna; Agus Salim	(Indonesia); Anjas Asmara; Iwan Sumoyo	1–0	(Thailand); Thawip Thongkamnerd; Sataporn Sawangreung	11
2	2002	(South Korea); Busan	(Japan); Katsuhiro Shiratori; Satoshi Watanabe	2–0	(Indonesia); Agus Salim; Koko Prasetyo Darkuncoro	(China); Li Hua; Zhao Chicheng	2–0	(Indonesia); Andy Ardiyansah; Supriadi	20
3	2006	(Qatar); Doha	(China); Zhou Shun; Li Jian	2–1	(China); Wu Penggen; Xu Linyin	(Indonesia); Agus Salim; Supriadi	2–1	(Indonesia); Andy Ardiyansah; Koko Prasetyo Darkuncoro	23
4	2010	(China); Guangzhou	(China); Wu Penggen; Xu Linyin	2–0	(China); Gao Peng; Li Jian	(Japan); Kentaro Asahi; Katsuhiro Shiratori	2–0	(Kazakhstan); Dmitriy Yakovlev; Alexey Kuleshov	29
5	2014	(South Korea); Incheon	(Kazakhstan); Alexey Sidorenko; Alexandr Dyachenko	2–0	(China); Chen Cheng; Li Jian	(China); Bao Jian; Abuduhalikejiang Mutailipu	2–0	(Indonesia); Koko Prasetyo Darkuncoro; Ade Candra Rachmawan	31
6	2018	(Indonesia); Jakarta–Palembang	(Qatar); Cherif Younousse; Ahmed Tijan	2–0	(Indonesia); Ade Candra Rachmawan; Mohammad Ashfiya	(Indonesia); Gilang Ramadhan; Danangsyah Pribadi	2–1	(China); Gao Peng; Li Yang	32
7	2022	(China); Hangzhou	(Qatar); Cherif Younousse; Ahmed Tijan	2–0	(China); Abuduhalikejiang Mutailipu; Wu Jiaxin	(Kazakhstan); Sergey Bogatu; Dmitriy Yakovlev	2–0	(Iran); Abbas Pourasgari; Alireza Aghajani	27
8	2026	(Japan); Aichi–Nagoya	(Qatar); Cherif Younousse; Ahmed Tijan	2–1	(Indonesia); Sofyan Rachman Efendi; Bintang Akbar	(Japan); Kota Kurosawa; Taito Mizumachi	2–1	(Thailand); Poravid Taovato; Pithak Tipjan	30

=== Women ===
#	Year	Host	Final			Third place match			Teams
#	Year	Host	Winner	Score	Runner-up	3rd place	Score	4th place	Teams
1	1998	(Thailand); Bangkok	(Thailand); Manatsanan Pangka; Rattanaporn Arlaisuk	2–0	(Japan); Yukiko Takahashi; Mika Saiki	(Japan); Ryoko Tokuno; Chiaki Kusuhara	1–0	(China); Liu Chunying; Zhang Jingkun	9
2	2002	(South Korea); Busan	(China); Tian Jia; Wang Fei	2–0	(China); Wang Lu; You Wenhui	(Japan); Ryoko Tokuno; Chiaki Kusuhara	2–0	(Thailand); Kamoltip Kulna; Jarunee Sannok	9
3	2006	(Qatar); Doha	(China); Xue Chen; Zhang Xi	2–1	(Japan); Shinako Tanaka; Eiko Koizumi	(China); Wang Jie; Tian Jia	2–0	(Thailand); Kamoltip Kulna; Jarunee Sannok	14
4	2010	(China); Guangzhou	(China); Xue Chen; Zhang Xi	2–0	(China); Huang Ying; Yue Yuan	(Thailand); Usa Tenpaksee; Jarunee Sannok	2–0	(Malaysia); Luk Teck Hua; Beh Shun Thing	16
5	2014	(South Korea); Incheon	(China); Ma Yuanyuan; Xia Xinyi	2–0	(Thailand); Tanarattha Udomchavee; Varapatsorn Radarong	(China); Wang Fan; Yue Yuan	2–0	(Thailand); Yupa Phokongploy; Usa Tenpaksee	11
6	2018	(Indonesia); Jakarta–Palembang	(China); Wang Fan; Xia Xinyi	2–1	(Japan); Megumi Murakami; Miki Ishii	(Indonesia); Dhita Juliana; Putu Dini Jasita Utami	2–0	(Kazakhstan); Tatyana Mashkova; Irina Tsimbalova	18
7	2022	(China); Hangzhou	(China); Xue Chen; Xia Xinyi	2–0	(Japan); Miki Ishii; Sayaka Mizoe	(China); Wang Fan; Dong Jie	2–0	(Thailand); Taravadee Naraphornrapat; Worapeerachayakorn Kongphopsarutawadee	20
8	2026	(Japan); Aichi–Nagoya	(Thailand); Taravadee Naraphornrapat; Worapeerachayakorn Kongphopsarutawadee	2–1	(China); Xia Xinyi; Yan Xu	(Philippines); Khylem Harl Progella; Sofiah Shanine Pagara	2–1	(China); Cao Shuting; Dong Jie	26

== Medal table ==
=== Total ===
Rank	Nation	Gold	Silver	Bronze	Total
1	China (CHN)	9	7	5	21
2	Qatar (QAT)	3	0	0	3
3	Thailand (THA)	2	1	1	4
4	Japan (JPN)	1	4	4	9
5	Kazakhstan (KAZ)	1	0	1	2
6	Indonesia (INA)	0	4	4	8
7	Philippines (PHI)	0	0	1	1
Totals (7 entries)		16	16	16	48

=== Men ===
Rank	Nation	Gold	Silver	Bronze	Total
1	China (CHN)	3	4	2	9
2	Qatar (QAT)	3	0	0	3
3	Japan (JPN)	1	0	2	3
4	Kazakhstan (KAZ)	1	0	1	2
5	Indonesia (INA)	0	4	3	7
Totals (5 entries)		8	8	8	24

=== Women ===
Rank	Nation	Gold	Silver	Bronze	Total
1	China (CHN)	6	3	3	12
2	Thailand (THA)	2	1	1	4
3	Japan (JPN)	0	4	2	6
4	Indonesia (INA)	0	0	1	1
4	Philippines (PHI)	0	0	1	1
Totals (5 entries)		8	8	8	24

== Participating nations ==
=== Men ===
Team	(Thailand) 1998	(South Korea) 2002	(Qatar) 2006	(China) 2010	(South Korea) 2014	(Indonesia) 2018	(China) 2022	Years
Afghanistan					17th	25th		2
Afghanistan					25th	25th		2
Bahrain		9th	13th					2
Bahrain		17th	17th					2
Bangladesh					25th	17th		2
Cambodia	7th		9th	17th	17th			4
Cambodia				25th				4
China	1st	3rd	1st	1st	2nd	4th	2nd	7
China		5th	2nd	2nd	3rd	5th	5th	7
Chinese Taipei						17th		1
Chinese Taipei						25th		1
Hong Kong	9th			9th	9th	17th	17th	5
Hong Kong						25th		5
India		17th	9th	17th				3
India		17th	13th	17th				3
Indonesia	2nd	2nd	3rd	5th	4th	2nd	5th	7
Indonesia	3rd	4th	4th	9th	5th	3rd	9th	7
Iran	7th			5th		5th	4th	4
Iran				9th		5th	5th	4
Japan	5th	1st	5th	3rd	5th	9th	9th	7
Japan		5th	5th	9th	5th	9th		7
Kazakhstan	9th	5th	7th	4th	1st	9th	3rd	7
Kazakhstan		9th	7th	5th	9th	9th	5th	7
Kuwait		9th			25th			2
Kuwait		17th			25th			2
Macau							25th	1
Macau							25th	1
Malaysia			17th	9th	9th	17th		4
Malaysia					17th			4
Maldives			17th		17th	25th	17th	4
Maldives					25th	25th		4
Oman			9th	5th	9th	5th	9th	5
Oman			17th	9th	17th	9th	9th	5
Palestine			17th			9th	17th	3
Palestine							17th	3
Philippines	9th		13th				9th	3
Philippines							17th	3
Qatar		9th	13th	17th	5th	1st	1st	6
Qatar		9th	17th	25th	9th	17th	9th	6
South Korea		9th		17th	17th	25th	17th	5
South Korea		9th		25th	17th		25th	5
Sri Lanka			9th	9th	9th	17th		4
Sri Lanka				17th	17th			4
Tajikistan					25th		17th	2
Thailand	4th	5th		9th	9th	9th	9th	6
Thailand	5th	9th		25th	9th	9th	9th	6
Timor-Leste				25th	25th	25th	17th	4
Turkmenistan			17th					1
Vietnam						17th		1
Vietnam						17th		1
Yemen				17th				1
Yemen				17th				1
Nations (28)	11	20	23	29	31	32	27	_

=== Women ===
Team	(Thailand) 1998	(South Korea) 2002	(Qatar) 2006	(China) 2010	(South Korea) 2014	(Indonesia) 2018	(China) 2022	Years
China	4th	1st	1st	1st	1st	1st	1st	7
China	5th	2nd	3rd	2nd	3rd	5th	3rd	7
Chinese Taipei				5th		9th		2
Chinese Taipei						9th		2
Hong Kong		9th	9th	9th	9th	9th	9th	6
Hong Kong						13th	9th	6
Indonesia	7th	5th				3rd	5th	4
Indonesia	7th					5th	9th	4
Iraq			13th					1
Japan	2nd	3rd	2nd	5th	5th	2nd	2nd	7
Japan	3rd		5th	5th	5th	5th	5th	7
Kazakhstan			9th	9th	5th	4th	9th	5
Kazakhstan			9th	9th		13th	9th	5
Macau							9th	1
Macau							17th	1
Malaysia			7th	4th				2
Mongolia			13th					1
Philippines	9th		7th				5th	3
Philippines							9th	3
South Korea		5th		9th	5th	13th	17th	5
South Korea		5th		9th	9th		17th	5
Sri Lanka			9th	9th			9th	3
Sri Lanka				9th				3
Tajikistan					9th		17th	2
Thailand	1st	4th	4th	3rd	2nd	5th	4th	7
Thailand	5th	5th	5th	5th	4th	9th	5th	7
Timor-Leste				9th		17th		2
Vietnam						13th		1
Vietnam						17th		1
Nations (17)	9	9	14	16	11	18	20	_
