= List of Asian Games medalists in beach volleyball =

This is the complete list of Asian Games medalists in beach volleyball from 1998 to 2026.

== Men ==
Games	Gold	Silver	Bronze
1998 Bangkok	Gu Hongyu and Li Hua (CHN)	Irilkhun Shofanna and Agus Salim (INA)	Anjas Asmara and Iwan Sumoyo (INA)
2002 Busan	Katsuhiro Shiratori and Satoshi Watanabe (JPN)	Agus Salim and Koko Prasetyo Darkuncoro (INA)	Li Hua and Zhao Chicheng (CHN)
2006 Doha	Zhou Shun and Li Jian (CHN)	Wu Penggen and Xu Linyin (CHN)	Agus Salim and Supriadi (INA)
2010 Guangzhou	Wu Penggen and Xu Linyin (CHN)	Gao Peng and Li Jian (CHN)	Kentaro Asahi and Katsuhiro Shiratori (JPN)
2014 Incheon	Alexey Sidorenko and Alexandr Dyachenko (KAZ)	Chen Cheng and Li Jian (CHN)	Bao Jian and Abuduhalikejiang Mutailipu (CHN)
2018 Jakarta–Palembang	Cherif Younousse and Ahmed Tijan (QAT)	Ade Candra Rachmawan and Mohammad Ashfiya (INA)	Gilang Ramadhan and Danangsyah Pribadi (INA)
2022 Hangzhou	Cherif Younousse and Ahmed Tijan (QAT)	Abuduhalikejiang Mutailipu and Wu Jiaxin (CHN)	Sergey Bogatu and Dmitriy Yakovlev (KAZ)
2026 Aichi–Nagoya	Cherif Younousse and Ahmed Tijan (QAT)	Sofyan Rachman Efendi and Bintang Akbar (INA)	Kota Kurosawa and Taito Mizumachi (JPN)

== Women ==
Games	Gold	Silver	Bronze
1998 Bangkok	Manatsanan Pangka and Rattanaporn Arlaisuk (THA)	Yukiko Takahashi and Mika Saiki (JPN)	Ryoko Tokuno and Chiaki Kusuhara (JPN)
2002 Busan	Tian Jia and Wang Fei (CHN)	Wang Lu and You Wenhui (CHN)	Ryoko Tokuno and Chiaki Kusuhara (JPN)
2006 Doha	Xue Chen and Zhang Xi (CHN)	Shinako Tanaka and Eiko Koizumi (JPN)	Wang Jie and Tian Jia (CHN)
2010 Guangzhou	Xue Chen and Zhang Xi (CHN)	Huang Ying and Yue Yuan (CHN)	Usa Tenpaksee and Jarunee Sannok (THA)
2014 Incheon	Ma Yuanyuan and Xia Xinyi (CHN)	Tanarattha Udomchavee and Varapatsorn Radarong (THA)	Wang Fan and Yue Yuan (CHN)
2018 Jakarta–Palembang	Wang Fan and Xia Xinyi (CHN)	Megumi Murakami and Miki Ishii (JPN)	Dhita Juliana and Putu Dini Jasita Utami (INA)
2022 Hangzhou	Xue Chen and Xia Xinyi (CHN)	Sayaka Mizoe and Miki Ishii (JPN)	Wang Fan and Dong Jie (CHN)
2026 Aichi–Nagoya	Taravadee Naraphornrapat and Worapeerachayakorn Kongphopsarutawadee (THA)	Xia Xinyi and Yan Xu (CHN)	Khylem Progella and Sofiah Pagara (PHI)
