= Beach volleyball at the 1998 Asian Games =

- Venue: Jomtien Beach
- Dates: 16–19 December 1998
- Competitors: 40 from 9 nations

Beach volleyball was one of the many sports which was held at the 1998 Asian Games in Bangkok, Thailand.

== Schedule ==
P	Preliminary round	½	Semifinals	F	Finals

Event↓/Date →	16th Wed	17th Thu	18th Fri		19th Sat
Men	P	P	P	½	F
Women	P	P	P	½	F

== Medalists ==
Event	Gold	Silver	Bronze
Men	China; Gu Hongyu; Li Hua	Indonesia; Irilkhun Shofanna; Agus Salim	Indonesia; Anjas Asmara; Iwan Sumoyo
Women	Thailand; Manatsanan Pangka; Rattanaporn Arlaisuk	Japan; Yukiko Takahashi; Mika Saiki	Japan; Ryoko Tokuno; Chiaki Kusuhara

== Medal table ==
Rank	Nation	Gold	Silver	Bronze	Total
1	China (CHN)	1	0	0	1
1	Thailand (THA)	1	0	0	1
3	Indonesia (INA)	0	1	1	2
3	Japan (JPN)	0	1	1	2
Totals (4 entries)		2	2	2	6

== Participating nations ==
A total of 40 athletes from 9 nations competed in beach volleyball at the 1998 Asian Games:

- Cambodia (2)
- China (6)
- Hong Kong (2)
- Indonesia (8)
- Iran (2)
- Japan (6)
- Kazakhstan (2)
- Philippines (4)
- Thailand (8)

== Final standing ==
=== Men ===
Rank	Team	Pld	W	L
1st place, gold medalist(s)	Gu Hongyu – Li Hua (CHN)	6	5	1
2nd place, silver medalist(s)	Irilkhun Shofanna – Agus Salim (INA)	4	3	1
3rd place, bronze medalist(s)	Anjas Asmara – Iwan Sumoyo (INA)	6	4	2
4	Thawip Thongkamnerd – Sataporn Sawangreung (THA)	4	2	2
5	Takuya Noguchi – Taichi Morikawa (JPN)	3	1	2
5	Sudjai Naktamna – Suntorn Phoseeta (THA)	4	2	2
7	Mut Savet – Um Sok (CAM)	4	2	2
7	Reza Bonyadi – Ebrahim Hosseinpour (IRI)	3	1	2
9	Chow Kwok Wai – Kwan Wing Sang (HKG)	2	0	2
9	Yevgeniy Mashebin – Oleg Aristarkhov (KAZ)	2	0	2
9	Leonardo Toyco – Elmer Valdez (PHI)	2	0	2

=== Women ===
Rank	Team	Pld	W	L
1st place, gold medalist(s)	Manatsanan Pangka – Rattanaporn Arlaisuk (THA)	5	4	1
2nd place, silver medalist(s)	Yukiko Takahashi – Mika Saiki (JPN)	4	3	1
3rd place, bronze medalist(s)	Ryoko Tokuno – Chiaki Kusuhara (JPN)	5	3	2
4	Liu Chunying – Zhang Jingkun (CHN)	4	2	2
5	Xiong Zi – Chi Rong (CHN)	3	1	2
5	Kamoltip Kulna – Wilaiwan Katmanee (THA)	4	2	2
7	Eta Kaize – Siti Nurjanah (INA)	2	0	2
7	Yohana Marawali – Betty Renjaan (INA)	3	1	2
9	Helen Dosdos – Gina Miguel (PHI)	2	0	2
