= Beach volleyball at the 2000 Summer Olympics – Women's tournament =

Women's beach volleyball at the Games of the XXVII Olympiad
- Venue: Bondi Beach Volleyball Centre
- Dates: September 16–25
- Competitors: 48 from 15 nations

Medalists
| 1st place, gold medalist(s) | | Natalie Cook; Kerri Pottharst | Australia |
| 2nd place, silver medalist(s) | | Shelda Bede; Adriana Behar | Brazil |
| 3rd place, bronze medalist(s) | | Sandra Pires; Adriana Samuel | Brazil |

These page shows the results of the Women's Beach Volleyball Tournament at the 2000 Summer Olympics at a temporary stadium on Bondi Beach in Sydney, held from September 16 to September 25, 2000.

== Results ==
=== Elimination rounds ===
==== Preliminary round ====
Winners advance to Round of 16 The 12 losers play elimination matches until 3 teams remain.
Competition Held on September 16, 2000

| Match Number | Athletes | NOC | Score | Seed |
|---|---|---|---|---|
| 1 | Natalie Cook and Kerri Pottharst | Australia | 15 | 1 |
| 1 | Teresa Galindo and Hilda Gaxiola | Mexico | 11 | 24 |
| 2 | Cristina Pereira and Maria José Schuller | Portugal | 15 | 13 |
| 2 | Rong Chi and Xiong Zi | China | 5 | 12 |
| 3 | Yukiko Takahashi and Mika Teru Saiki | Japan | 15 | 6 |
| 3 | Yuki Ishizaka and Rii Seike | Japan | 5 | 19 |
| 4 | Daniela Gattelli and Lucilla Perrotta | Italy | 9 | 18 |
| 4 | Tania Gooley and Pauline Manser | Australia | 15 | 7 |
| 5 | Laura Bruschini and Annamaria Solazzi | Italy | 15 | 9 |
| 5 | Vasso Karadassiou and Efi Sfyri | Greece | 2 | 16 |
| 6 | Martina Hudcová and Tereza Tobiasová | Czech Republic | 5 | 21 |
| 6 | Misty May-Treanor and Holly McPeak | United States | 15 | 4 |
| 7 | Annett Davis and Jenny Johnson Jordan | United States | 15 | 3 |
| 7 | Annette Huygens-Tholen and Sarah Straton | Australia | 13 | 22 |
| 8 | Anabelle Prawerman and Cécile Rigaux | France | 16 | 15 |
| 8 | Maike Friedrichsen and Danja Müsch | Germany | 14 | 10 |
| 9 | Ulrike Schmidt and Gudi Staub | Germany | 17 | 8 |
| 9 | Jia Tian and Jingkun Zhang | China | 15 | 17 |
| 10 | Dalixia Fernández and Tamara Larrea | Cuba | 4 | 20 |
| 10 | Sandra Pires and Adriana Samuel | Brazil | 15 | 5 |
| 11 | Rebekka Kadijk and Debora Schoon-Kadijk | Netherlands | 15 | 11 |
| 11 | Eva Celbová and Sona Novaková | Czech Republic | 17 | 14 |
| 12 | Lina Yanchulova and Petia Yanchulova | Bulgaria | 3 | 23 |
| 12 | Shelda Bede and Adriana Behar | Brazil | 15 | 2 |

==== Preliminary Elimination ====
Competition Held on September 18, 2000,

First Round

Losers eliminated, and placed 19th

| Match Number | Athletes | NOC | Score | Seed |
|---|---|---|---|---|
| 13 | Teresa Galindo and Hilda Gaxiola | Mexico | 14 | 24 |
| 13 | Rong Chi and Xiong Zi | China | 16 | 12 |
| 14 | Yuki Ishizaka and Rii Seike | Japan | 5 | 19 |
| 14 | Daniela Gattelli and Lucilla Perrotta | Italy | 15 | 18 |
| 15 | Vasso Karadassiou and Efi Sfyri | Greece | 15 | 16 |
| 15 | Martina Hudcová and Tereza Tobiasová | Czech Republic | 6 | 21 |
| 16 | Annette Huygens-Tholen and Sarah Straton | Australia | 9 | 22 |
| 16 | Maike Friedrichsen and Danja Müsch | Germany | 15 | 10 |
| 17 | Jia Tian and Jingkun Zhang | China | 12 | 17 |
| 17 | Dalixia Fernández and Tamara Larrea | Cuba | 15 | 20 |
| 18 | Rebekka Kadijk and Debora Schoon-Kadijk | Netherlands | 15 | 11 |
| 18 | Lina Yanchulova and Petia Yanchulova | Bulgaria | 17 | 23 |

Second Round

Winners advance to Round of 16 plus team with highest point ratio; losers eliminated and place 17th

| Match Number | Athletes | NOC | Score | Seed |
|---|---|---|---|---|
| 19 | Rong Chi and Xiong Zi | China | 9 | 12 |
| 19 | Daniela Gattelli and Lucilla Perrotta | Italy | 15 | 18 |
| 20 | Vasso Karadassiou and Efi Sfyri | Greece | 7 | 16 |
| 20 | Maike Friedrichsen and Danja Müsch | Germany | 15 | 10 |
| 21 | Dalixia Fernández and Tamara Larrea | Cuba | 15 | 20 |
| 21 | Lina Yanchulova and Petia Yanchulova | Bulgaria | 3 | 23 |

Rong Chi and Xiong Zi China Qualified due to highest point ratio.

=== Round of 16 ===
Competition Held on September 21, 2000

- Losers eliminated, place ninth

| Match Number | Athletes | NOC | Score | Seed |
|---|---|---|---|---|
| 22 | Natalie Cook and Kerri Pottharst | Australia | 15 | 1 |
| 22 | Rong Chi and Xiong Zi | China | 2 | 12 |
| 23 | Laura Bruschini and Annamaria Solazzi | Italy | 15 | 9 |
| 23 | Ulrike Schmidt and Gudi Staub | Germany | 12 | 8 |
| 24 | Sandra Pires and Adriana Samuel | Brazil | 15 | 5 |
| 24 | Cristina Pereira and Maria José Schuller | Portugal | 6 | 13 |
| 25 | Daniela Gattelli and Lucilla Perrotta | Italy | 13 | 18 |
| 25 | Misty May-Treanor and Holly McPeak | United States | 15 | 4 |
| 26 | Annett Davis and Jenny Johnson Jordan | United States | 15 | 3 |
| 26 | Dalixia Fernández and Tamara Larrea | Cuba | 9 | 20 |
| 27 | Eva Celbová and Sona Novaková | Czech Republic | 2 | 14 |
| 27 | Yukiko Takahashi and Mika Teru Saiki | Japan | 15 | 6 |
| 28 | Tania Gooley and Pauline Manser | Australia | 15 | 7 |
| 28 | Anabelle Prawerman and Cécile Rigaux | France | 3 | 15 |
| 29 | Maike Friedrichsen and Danja Müsch | Germany | 9 | 10 |
| 29 | Shelda Bede and Adriana Behar | Brazil | 15 | 2 |

=== Quarter-finals ===
Competition Held on September 23, 2000

- Losers eliminated, place fifth

| Match Number | Athletes | NOC | Score | Seed |
|---|---|---|---|---|
| 30 | Natalie Cook and Kerri Pottharst | Australia | 15 | 1 |
| 30 | Laura Bruschini and Annamaria Solazzi | Italy | 11 | 9 |
| 31 | Sandra Pires and Adriana Samuel | Brazil | 16 | 5 |
| 31 | Misty May-Treanor and Holly McPeak | United States | 14 | 4 |
| 32 | Annett Davis and Jenny Johnson Jordan | United States | 9 | 3 |
| 32 | Yukiko Takahashi and Mika Teru Saiki | Japan | 15 | 6 |
| 33 | Tania Gooley and Pauline Manser | Australia | 7 | 7 |
| 33 | Shelda Bede and Adriana Behar | Brazil | 15 | 2 |

=== Semi-finals ===
| Sep 23, 2000; 14:30 | Yukiko Takahashi – Mika Teru Saiki (JPN) | 0–1 | Shelda Bede – Adriana Behar (BRA) | Bondi Beach, Sydney; Attendance: 10,000; Referees: Jeff Brehaut (GER), Hadrea Haas (AUT) |
| Sep 23, 2000; 14:30 | (10–15); Result | | | Bondi Beach, Sydney; Attendance: 10,000; Referees: Jeff Brehaut (GER), Hadrea Haas (AUT) |

| Sep 23, 2000; 14:30 | Natalie Cook – Kerri Pottharst (AUS) | 1–0 | Sandra Pires – Adriana Samuel (BRA) | Bondi Beach, Sydney; Attendance: 10,000; Referees: Darryl Friensen (CAN), Sue Lemaire (USA) |
| Sep 23, 2000; 14:30 | (15–6); Result | | | Bondi Beach, Sydney; Attendance: 10,000; Referees: Darryl Friensen (CAN), Sue Lemaire (USA) |

=== Bronze medal match ===
| Sep 25, 2000; 12:00 | Sandra Pires – Adriana Samuel (BRA) | 2–0 | Yukiko Takahashi – Mika Teru Saiki (JPN) | Bondi Beach, Sydney; Attendance: 10,000; Referees: Andrea Haas (AUT), Ruediger Nissen Franzen (GER) |
| Sep 25, 2000; 12:00 | (12–4, 12–6); Result | | | Bondi Beach, Sydney; Attendance: 10,000; Referees: Andrea Haas (AUT), Ruediger Nissen Franzen (GER) |

=== Gold Medal match ===
| Sep 25, 2000; 14:00 | Natalie Cook – Kerri Pottharst (AUS) | 2–0 | Shelda Bede – Adriana Behar (BRA) | Bondi Beach, Sydney; Attendance: 10,000; Referees: Darryl Friensen (CAN), Sue Lemaire (USA) |
| Sep 25, 2000; 14:00 | (12–11, 12–10); Result | | | Bondi Beach, Sydney; Attendance: 10,000; Referees: Darryl Friensen (CAN), Sue Lemaire (USA) |

== Final ranking ==
| RANK | NOC | ATHLETE NAMES | SEED |
|---|---|---|---|
| 1st place, gold medalist(s) | Australia | Natalie Cook and Kerri Pottharst | 1 |
| 2nd place, silver medalist(s) | Brazil | Shelda Bede and Adriana Behar | 2 |
| 3rd place, bronze medalist(s) | Brazil | Sandra Pires and Adriana Samuel | 5 |
| 4. | Japan | Yukiko Takahashi and Mika Teru Saiki | 6 |
| 5. | United States | Annett Davis and Jenny Johnson Jordan | 3 |
| 5. | United States | Misty May-Treanor and Holly McPeak | 4 |
| 5. | Australia | Tania Gooley and Pauline Manser | 7 |
| 5. | Italy | Laura Bruschini and Annamaria Solazzi | 9 |
| 9. | Germany | Ulrike Schmidt and Gudi Staub | 8 |
| 9. | Germany | Maike Friedrichsen and Danja Müsch | 10 |
| 9. | China | Chi Rong and Xiong Zi | 12 |
| 9. | Portugal | Cristina Pereira and Maria José Schuller | 13 |
| 9. | Czech Republic | Eva Celbová and Sona Novaková | 14 |
| 9. | France | Anabelle Prawerman and Cécile Rigaux | 15 |
| 9. | Italy | Daniela Gattelli and Lucilla Perrotta | 18 |
| 9. | Cuba | Dalixia Fernández and Tamara Larrea | 20 |
| 17. | Greece | Vasso Karadassiou and Efi Sfyri | 16 |
| 17. | Bulgaria | Lina Yanchulova and Petia Yanchulova | 23 |
| 19. | Netherlands | Rebekka Kadijk and Debora Schoon-Kadijk | 11 |
| 19. | China | Jia Tian and Zhang Jingkun | 17 |
| 19. | Japan | Yuki Ishizaka and Rii Seike | 19 |
| 19. | Czech Republic | Martina Hudcová and Tereza Tobiášová | 21 |
| 19. | Australia | Annette Huygens-Tholen and Sarah Straton | 22 |
| 19. | Mexico | Teresa Galindo and Hilda Gaxiola | 24 |

== See also ==
- Men's Beach Volleyball Tournament
- Volleyball at the Summer Olympics
