= Beach volleyball at the 2002 Asian Games =

- Venue: Haeundae Beach
- Dates: 29 September – 4 October 2002
- Competitors: 58 from 11 nations

Beach volleyball was one of the many sports which was held at the 2002 Asian Games in Busan, South Korea.

== Schedule ==
P	Preliminary round	R	Round of 16	¼	Quarterfinals	½	Semifinals	F	Finals

Event↓/Date →	29th Sun	30th Mon	1st Tue	2nd Wed	3rd Thu		4th Fri
Men	P	P	P	R	¼	½	F
Women	P	P	P	P	¼	½	F

== Medalists ==
Event	Gold	Silver	Bronze
Men	Japan; Katsuhiro Shiratori; Satoshi Watanabe	Indonesia; Agus Salim; Koko Prasetyo Darkuncoro	China; Li Hua; Zhao Chicheng
Women	China; Tian Jia; Wang Fei	China; Wang Lu; You Wenhui	Japan; Ryoko Tokuno; Chiaki Kusuhara

== Medal table ==
Rank	Nation	Gold	Silver	Bronze	Total
1	China (CHN)	1	1	1	3
2	Japan (JPN)	1	0	1	2
3	Indonesia (INA)	0	1	0	1
Totals (3 entries)		2	2	2	6

== Participating nations ==
A total of 58 athletes from 11 nations competed in beach volleyball at the 2002 Asian Games:

- Bahrain (4)
- China (8)
- Hong Kong (2)
- India (4)
- Indonesia (6)
- Japan (6)
- Kazakhstan (4)
- Kuwait (4)
- Qatar (4)
- South Korea (8)
- Thailand (8)

== Final standing ==
=== Men ===
Rank	Team	Pld	W	L
1st place, gold medalist(s)	Katsuhiro Shiratori – Satoshi Watanabe (JPN)	8	8	0
2nd place, silver medalist(s)	Agus Salim – Koko Prasetyo Darkuncoro (INA)	8	7	1
3rd place, bronze medalist(s)	Li Hua – Zhao Chicheng (CHN)	8	6	2
4	Andy Ardiyansah – Supriadi (INA)	8	5	3
5	Teng Maomin – Xu Qiang (CHN)	6	3	3
5	Hayato Kirihara – Ko Ozaki (JPN)	6	5	1
5	Yevgeniy Mashebin – Sergey Sinkevich (KAZ)	6	3	3
5	Thawip Thongkamnerd – Sataporn Sawangreung (THA)	6	4	2
9	Osama Isa – Qader Abdulla (BRN)	5	3	2
9	Pavel Zabuslayev – Dmitriy Vorobyev (KAZ)	5	3	2
9	Choi Bu-sik – Park Sang-heun (KOR)	5	1	4
9	Sim Yeon-sub – Lee Byoung-hee (KOR)	5	2	3
9	Dawood Abdulqader – Adel Al-Muzail (KUW)	5	1	4
9	Ali Ishaq Bairami – Mohammed Salem Al-Kuwari (QAT)	5	1	4
9	Mubarak Rasheed – Mohammed Anber (QAT)	5	2	3
9	Sonthi Bunrueang – Petch Patsorn (THA)	5	2	3
17	Sadeq Ebrahim – Ali Abdulameer (BRN)	4	0	4
17	Pradeep John – Mohan Poothathan (IND)	4	0	4
17	Krishna Reddy Patlilla – Jameeluddin Mohammed (IND)	4	0	4
17	Ahmad Sulaiman – Mohammad Sabah (KUW)	4	0	4

=== Women ===
Rank	Team	Pld	W	L
1st place, gold medalist(s)	Tian Jia – Wang Fei (CHN)	6	6	0
2nd place, silver medalist(s)	Wang Lu – You Wenhui (CHN)	7	4	3
3rd place, bronze medalist(s)	Ryoko Tokuno – Chiaki Kusuhara (JPN)	7	6	1
4	Kamoltip Kulna – Jarunee Sannok (THA)	7	4	3
5	Timy Yudhani Rahayu – Siti Nurjanah (INA)	4	1	3
5	Chang Yoon-hee – Kim Yeon (KOR)	4	0	4
5	Lee Mi-soon – Ji Kyung-hee (KOR)	5	1	4
5	Manatsanan Pangka – Rattanaporn Arlaisuk (THA)	4	2	2
9	Tang Ming Mei – Tong Lai Ming (HKG)	4	0	4
