= Beach volleyball at the 2004 Summer Olympics – Women's tournament =

Women's beach volleyball at the Games of the XXVIII Olympiad
- Venue: Olympic Beach Volleyball Centre
- Dates: August 15–25
- Competitors: 48 from 17 nations

Medalists
1st place, gold medalist(s)		Kerri Walsh Jennings; Misty May-Treanor	United States
2nd place, silver medalist(s)		Shelda Bede; Adriana Behar	Brazil
3rd place, bronze medalist(s)		Holly McPeak; Elaine Youngs	United States

The Women's beach volleyball event at the 2004 Summer Olympics in Athens, Greece, was held at the Olympic Beach Volleyball Centre located at the Faliro Coastal Zone Olympic Complex. The gold medal went to Kerri Walsh and Misty May who had a perfect record in the tournament, losing not a single set. The reigning champions from the 2000 Olympics, Natalie Cook and Kerri Ann Pottharst, both had new partners for Athens and coincidentally met at the last sixteen stage where Cook's team took the honours. Adriana Behar and Shelda Bede repeated their 2000 Olympic result, taking silver.

== Pool play ==
The 24 competing teams were split equally into six pools of four, and each team played each of the other teams in their pool a best of three set match (so that the number of pool matches, P, played by each team was 3).

The teams in each pool were ranked first through fourth based on the number of matches won, W. In the event of a two-way tie, the winning team in the head-to-head match finished ahead. In a three-team tie, the total number of points each team won and lost during all matches involving only the three tied teams were added up, and the bottom-ranked team of the three was decided by the points for to points against ratio; the other two teams were then ranked according to the outcome of the head-to-head match. The top two teams from each pool and the four best third placed teams (based on: first, matches won; second (in the event of a tie), set ratio SF/SA; and third (if there is still a tie), points ratio PF/PA) progressed through to the round of sixteen (single elimination tournament).

Two points (Pts) were awarded for each match win (W) and one point was given for each loss (L).
In individual matches, all winners are shown in bold.
In group tables, advancing teams are highlighted.

=== Pool A ===
Team	P:	W:	L:	SF:	SA:	PF:	PA:	Pts:
Kerri Walsh and Misty May (USA)	3	3	0	6	0	126	83	6
Eva Celbová and Sona Nováková (CZE)	3	2	1	4	2	120	110	5
Ryoko Tokuno and Chiaki Kusuhara (JPN)	3	1	2	2	5	109	137	4
Rebekka Kadijk and Marrit Leenstra (NED)	3	0	3	1	6	110	135	3

August 15

**Celbová & Nováková**	**2–0**	Kadijk & Leenstra	21–19, 21–16
**Walsh & May**	**2–0**	Tokuno & Kusuhara	21–9, 21–16

August 17

**Celbová & Nováková**	**2–0**	Tokuno & Kusuhara	23–21, 21–12
**Walsh & May**	**2–0**	Kadijk & Leenstra	21–11, 21–13

August 19

Kadijk & Leenstra	**1–2**	**Tokuno & Kusuhara**	21–15, 17–21, 13–15
**Walsh & May**	**2–0**	Celbová & Nováková	21–17, 21–17

=== Pool B ===
Team	P:	W:	L:	SF:	SA:	PF:	PA:	Pts:
Shelda Bede and Adriana Behar (BRA)	3	3	0	6	0	126	84	6
Dalixia Fernández and Tamara Larrea (CUB)	3	2	1	4	3	129	125	5
Daniela Gattelli and Lucilla Perrotta (ITA)	3	1	2	3	4	124	128	4
Leigh Ann Naidoo and Julia Willand (RSA)	3	0	3	0	6	84	126	3

August 15

**Fernández & Larrea**	**2–1**	Gattelli & Perrotta	21–17, 18–21, 15–10
**Bede & Behar**	**2–0**	Naidoo & Willard	21–7, 21–10

August 17

**Fernández & Larrea**	**2–0**	Naidoo & Willard	21–19, 21–16
**Bede & Behar**	**2–0**	Gattelli & Perrotta	21–17, 21–17

August 19

**Gattelli & Perrotta**	**2–0**	Naidoo & Willard	21–18, 21–14
**Bede & Behar**	**2–0**	Fernández & Larrea	21–14, 21–19

=== Pool C ===
Team	P:	W:	L:	SF:	SA:	PF:	PA:	Pts:
Susanne Lahme and Danja Müsch (GER)	3	2	1	5	4	156	143	5
Ana Paula Connelly and Sandra Pires (BRA)	3	2	1	5	2	131	118	5
Vassiliki Arvaniti and Efthalia Koutroumanidou (GRE)	3	1	2	3	5	131	140	4
Nila Håkedal and Ingrid Tørlen (NOR)	3	1	2	3	5	132	149	4

August 15

**Ana Paula & Sandra Pires**	**2–0**	Håkedal & Tørlen	21–18, 21–19
**Lahme & Müsch**	**2–1**	Arvaniti & Koutroumanidou	21–16, 16–21, 15–10

August 17

**Ana Paula & Sandra Pires**	**2–0**	Arvaniti & Koutroumanidou	21–13, 21–14
Lahme & Müsch	**1–2**	**Håkedal & Tørlen**	21–13, 17–21, 12–15

August 19

Ana Paula & Sandra Pires	**1–2**	**Lahme & Müsch**	21–18, 15–21, 11–15
**Arvaniti & Koutroumanidou**	**2–1**	Håkedal & Tørlen	21–11, 21–23, 15–12

=== Pool D ===
Team	P:	W:	L:	SF:	SA:	PF:	PA:	Pts:
Holly McPeak and Elaine Youngs (USA)	3	3	0	6	2	148	124	6
Guylaine Dumont and Annie Martin (CAN)	3	2	1	5	2	135	123	5
Kathrine Maaseide and Susanne Glesnes (NOR)	3	1	2	2	5	127	144	4
Nicole Schnyder and Simone Kuhn (SUI)	3	0	3	2	6	134	153	3

August 14

Schnyder & Kuhn	**0–2**	**Dumont & Martin**	16–21, 13–21
**McPeak & Youngs**	**2–0**	Maaseide & Glesnes	21–14, 21–14

August 16

Schnyder & Kuhn	**1–2**	**Maaseide & Glesnes**	18–21, 21–17, 13–15
**McPeak & Youngs**	**2–1**	Dumont & Martin	21–13, 12–21, 15–9

August 18

**Dumont & Martin**	**2–0**	Maaseide & Glesnes	21–19, 29–27
**McPeak & Youngs**	**2–1**	Schnyder & Kuhn	22–24, 21–17, 15–12

=== Pool E ===
Team	P:	W:	L:	SF:	SA:	PF:	PA:	Pts:
Okka Rau and Stephanie Pohl (GER)	3	2	1	5	2	138	119	5
Natalie Cook and Nicole Sanderson (AUS)	3	2	1	4	3	127	126	5
Tzvetelina Yanchulova and Petia Yanchulova (BUL)	3	2	1	4	3	124	131	5
Wang Lu and You Wenhui (CHN)	3	0	3	1	6	126	139	3

August 14

**Rau & Pohl**	**2–0**	Wang & You	21–17, 21–18
**Cook & Sanderson**	**2–0**	Yanchulova & Yanchulova	21–16, 21–12

August 16

Rau & Pohl	**1–2**	**Yanchulova & Yanchulova**	21–18, 19–21, 13–15
**Cook & Sanderson**	**2–1**	Wang & You	21–19, 17–21, 17–15

August 18

Wang & You	**0–2**	**Yanchulova & Yanchulova**	19–21, 17–21
Cook & Sanderson	**0–2**	**Rau & Pohl**	10–21, 20–22

=== Pool F ===
Team	P:	W:	L:	SF:	SA:	PF:	PA:	Pts:
Summer Lochowicz and Kerri Pottharst (AUS)	3	3	0	6	1	142	130	6
Vasso Karadassiou and Effrosyni Sfyri (GRE)	3	2	1	5	2	134	113	5
Tian Jia and Wang Fei (CHN)	3	1	2	2	4	109	118	4
Mayra García and Hilda Gaxiola (MEX)	3	0	3	0	6	108	132	3

August 14

Tian & Wang	**0–2**	**Lochowicz & Pottharst**	18–21, 18–21
**Karadassiou & Sfyri**	**2–0**	García & Gaxiola	21–17, 21–13

August 16

**Tian & Wang**	**2–0**	García & Gaxiola	21–19, 21–15
Karadassiou & Sfyri	**1–2**	**Lochowicz & Pottharst**	15–21, 21–15, 14–16

August 18

**Lochowicz & Pottharst**	**2–0**	García & Gaxiola	26–24, 22–20
**Karadassiou & Sfyri**	**2–0**	Tian & Wang	21–14, 21–17

== Playoffs ==
=== Round of 16 ===
August 20

Fernández & Larrea	0–2	Dumont & Martin	18–21, 19–21
Lahme & Musch	1–2	Gattelli & Perrotta	21–16, 17–21, 19–21
Lochowicz & Pottharst	0–2	Cook & Sanderson	15–21, 16–21
Ana Paula & Sandra Pires	2–0	Karadassiou & Sfyri	21–16, 21–19

August 21

Walsh & May	2–0	Tian & Wang	21–11, 21–18
Arvaniti & Koutroumanidou	1–2	Rau & Pohl	12–21, 21–19, 11–15
Celbová & Nováková	0–2	McPeak & Youngs	16–21, 16–21
Yanchulova & Yanchulova	1–2	Bede & Behar	21–18, 16–21, 11–15

=== Quarter-finals ===
August 22

Walsh & May	2–0	Dumont & Martin	21–19, 21–14
Rau & Pohl	0–2	McPeak & Youngs	17–21, 17–21
Gattelli & Perrotta	1–2	Cook & Sanderson	16–21, 21–14, 12–15
Ana Paula & Sandra Pires	1–2	Bede & Behar	21–15, 13–21, 13–15

=== Semi-finals ===
August 23

Walsh & May	2–0	McPeak & Youngs	21–18, 21–15
Cook & Sanderson	0–2	Bede & Behar	17–21, 16–21

=== Bronze-medal match ===
August 24

(bronze) McPeak & Youngs	2–1	Cook & Sanderson	21–18, 15–21, 15–9

=== Gold-medal match ===
August 24

(gold) Walsh & May	2–0	Bede & Behar (silver)	21–17, 21–11

== Final ranking ==
RANK	ATHLETE NAMES	COUNTRY	SEED
1st place, gold medalist(s)	Kerri Walsh and Misty May	United States	1
2nd place, silver medalist(s)	Shelda Bede and Adriana Behar	Brazil	2
3rd place, bronze medalist(s)	Holly McPeak and Elaine Youngs	United States	4
4.	Natalie Cook and Nicole Sanderson	Australia	5
5.	Ana Paula Connelly and Sandra Pires	Brazil	3
5.	Okka Rau and Stephanie Pohl	Germany	8
5.	Daniela Gattelli and Lucilla Perrotta	Italy	14
5.	Guylaine Dumont and Annie Martin	Canada	16
9.	Vasso Karadassiou and Effrosyni Sfyri	Greece	6
9.	Tian Jia and Wang Fei	China	7
9.	Susanne Lahme and Danja Müsch	Germany	10
9.	Dalixia Fernández and Tamara Larrea	Cuba	11
9.	Eva Celbová and Sona Nováková	Czech Republic	12
9.	Vassiliki Arvaniti and Efthalia Koutroumanidou	Greece	15
9.	Summer Lochowicz and Kerri Pottharst	Australia	18
9.	Tzvetelina Yanchulova and Petia Yanchulova	Bulgaria	20
17.	Kathrine Maaseide and Susanne Glesnes	Norway	21
17.	Ryoko Tokuno and Chiaki Kusuhara	Japan	24
19.	Nicole Schnyder and Simone Kuhn	Switzerland	9
19.	Rebekka Kadijk and Marrit Leenstra	Netherlands	13
19.	Wang Lu and You Wenhui	China	17
19.	Mayra García and Hilda Gaxiola	Mexico	19
19.	Nila Håkedal and Ingrid Tørlen	Norway	22
19.	Leigh Ann Naidoo and Julia Willand	South Africa	23

== See also ==
- Volleyball at the Summer Olympics
