= Beach volleyball at the 2006 Asian Games =

- Venue: Doha Sports City
- Dates: 2–11 December 2006
- Competitors: 74 from 19 nations

Beach volleyball at the 2006 Asian Games was held in Doha, Qatar.

== Schedule ==
| P | Preliminary round | ½ | Semifinals | F | Finals |

| Event↓/Date → | 2nd Sat | 3rd Sun | 4th Mon | 5th Tue | 6th Wed | 7th Thu | 8th Fri | 9th Sat | 10th Sun | 11th Mon |
|---|---|---|---|---|---|---|---|---|---|---|
| Men | P | P | P | P | P | P | P | P | ½ | F |
| Women | P | P | P | P | P | P | | P | ½ | F |

== Medalists ==
| Event | Gold | Silver | Bronze |
|---|---|---|---|
| Men | China; Zhou Shun; Li Jian | China; Wu Penggen; Xu Linyin | Indonesia; Agus Salim; Supriadi |
| Women | China; Xue Chen; Zhang Xi | Japan; Shinako Tanaka; Eiko Koizumi | China; Wang Jie; Tian Jia |

== Medal table ==
| Rank | Nation | Gold | Silver | Bronze | Total |
|---|---|---|---|---|---|
| 1 | China (CHN) | 2 | 1 | 1 | 4 |
| 2 | Japan (JPN) | 0 | 1 | 0 | 1 |
| 3 | Indonesia (INA) | 0 | 0 | 1 | 1 |
| Totals (3 entries) | | 2 | 2 | 2 | 6 |

== Participating nations ==
A total of 74 athletes from 19 nations competed in beach volleyball at the 2006 Asian Games:

- Bahrain (4)
- Cambodia (2)
- China (8)
- Hong Kong (2)
- India (4)
- Indonesia (4)
- Iraq (2)
- Japan (8)
- Kazakhstan (8)
- Malaysia (4)
- Maldives (2)
- Mongolia (2)
- Oman (4)
- Palestine (2)
- Philippines (4)
- Qatar (4)
- Sri Lanka (4)
- Thailand (4)
- Turkmenistan (2)

== Final standing ==
=== Men ===
| Rank | Team | Pld | W | L |
|---|---|---|---|---|
| 1st place, gold medalist(s) | Zhou Shun – Li Jian (CHN) | 6 | 5 | 1 |
| 2nd place, silver medalist(s) | Wu Penggen – Xu Linyin (CHN) | 5 | 4 | 1 |
| 3rd place, bronze medalist(s) | Agus Salim – Supriadi (INA) | 6 | 5 | 1 |
| 4 | Andy Ardiyansah – Koko Prasetyo Darkuncoro (INA) | 7 | 4 | 3 |
| 5 | Kentaro Asahi – Katsuhiro Shiratori (JPN) | 5 | 3 | 2 |
| 5 | Koichi Nishimura – Satoshi Watanabe (JPN) | 4 | 2 | 2 |
| 7 | Pavel Saulko – Pavel Zabuslayev (KAZ) | 4 | 2 | 2 |
| 7 | Dmitriy Vorobyev – Alexey Sidorenko (KAZ) | 4 | 2 | 2 |
| 9 | Som Chamnap – Koung Sopheap (CAM) | 4 | 2 | 2 |
| 9 | Pradeep John – Mohan Poothathan (IND) | 4 | 2 | 2 |
| 9 | Khalifa Al-Jabri – Badar Al-Subhi (OMA) | 4 | 2 | 2 |
| 9 | Dhammika Rohan Silva – Mahesh Perera (SRI) | 5 | 3 | 2 |
| 13 | Yunes Hasan Parwees – Hasan Aqeel Qarqoor (BRN) | 4 | 2 | 2 |
| 13 | Jameeluddin Mohammed – Shashidhar Tilkam (IND) | 3 | 1 | 2 |
| 13 | Parley Tupaz – Rhovyl Verayo (PHI) | 4 | 2 | 2 |
| 13 | Mohammed Anber – Mohammed Salem Al-Kuwari (QAT) | 2 | 0 | 2 |
| 17 | Osama Isa – Qader Abdulla (BRN) | 3 | 1 | 2 |
| 17 | Khoo Chong Long – Mohd Rafiq Latif (MAS) | 3 | 1 | 2 |
| 17 | Mohamed Nadeem – Waheed Fathuhulla (MDV) | 2 | 0 | 2 |
| 17 | Yaqoob Al-Maqbali – Ibrahim Al-Farsi (OMA) | 3 | 1 | 2 |
| 17 | Ayman Odeh – Rafi Asfour (PLE) | 2 | 0 | 2 |
| 17 | Saeed Al-Jamani – Ziad Benlouaer (QAT) | 2 | 0 | 2 |
| 17 | Döwletmyrat Hallyýew – Mämed Batyrow (TKM) | 2 | 0 | 2 |

=== Women ===
| Rank | Team | Pld | W | L |
|---|---|---|---|---|
| 1st place, gold medalist(s) | Xue Chen – Zhang Xi (CHN) | 5 | 4 | 1 |
| 2nd place, silver medalist(s) | Shinako Tanaka – Eiko Koizumi (JPN) | 5 | 4 | 1 |
| 3rd place, bronze medalist(s) | Wang Jie – Tian Jia (CHN) | 4 | 3 | 1 |
| 4 | Kamoltip Kulna – Jarunee Sannok (THA) | 6 | 3 | 3 |
| 5 | Chiaki Kusuhara – Satoko Urata (JPN) | 5 | 3 | 2 |
| 5 | Yupa Phokongloy – Usa Tenpaksee (THA) | 5 | 3 | 2 |
| 7 | Luk Teck Eng – Beh Shun Thing (MAS) | 4 | 2 | 2 |
| 7 | Diane Pascua – Heidi Ilustre (PHI) | 4 | 2 | 2 |
| 9 | Tse Wing Hung – Kong Cheuk Yee (HKG) | 3 | 1 | 2 |
| 9 | Irina Penkina – Olga Dyachenko (KAZ) | 2 | 0 | 2 |
| 9 | Marina Storozhenko – Yelena Alenkina (KAZ) | 2 | 0 | 2 |
| 9 | Geethika Gunawardena – Sujeewa Wijesinghe (SRI) | 3 | 1 | 2 |
| 13 | Liza Aghasy – Lida Aghasy (IRQ) | 2 | 0 | 2 |
| 13 | Tsogtbaataryn Bayarmaa – Yarinpiliin Enkhmaa (MGL) | 2 | 0 | 2 |
