= Beach volleyball at the 2002 Asian Games – Women's tournament =

Women at the 2002 Asian Games
- Venue: Haeundae Beach
- Date: 29 September – 4 October 2002
- Competitors: 18 from 6 nations

Medalists
gold medal	Tian Jia; Wang Fei	China
silver medal	Wang Lu; You Wenhui	China
bronze medal	Ryoko Tokuno; Chiaki Kusuhara	Japan

The Women's Beach volleyball Tournament at the 2002 Asian Games was held from September 29 to October 4, 2002 in Busan, South Korea.

== Schedule ==
All times are Korea Standard Time (UTC+09:00)

Date	Time	Event
Sunday, 29 September 2002	13:00	Preliminary round 1
Monday, 30 September 2002	12:00	Preliminary round 2
Monday, 30 September 2002	15:00	Preliminary round 3
Tuesday, 1 October 2002	12:00	Preliminary round 3
Tuesday, 1 October 2002	15:00	Preliminary round 4
Wednesday, 2 October 2002	13:00	Preliminary round 5
Thursday, 3 October 2002	10:00	1/4 finals
Thursday, 3 October 2002	14:00	Semifinals
Friday, 4 October 2002	11:00	3rd–4th place
Friday, 4 October 2002	15:00	Final

== Results ==
=== Preliminary round ===
==== Pool A ====
Pos	Team	Pld	W	L	Pts	SW	SL	SR	SPW	SPL	SPR	Qualification
1	Tian–Wang (CHN)	3	3	0	6	6	1	6.000	145	98	1.480	1/4 finals
2	Pangka–Arlaisuk (THA)	3	2	1	5	5	2	2.500	135	123	1.098	1/4 finals
3	Rahayu–Nurjanah (INA)	3	1	2	4	2	4	0.500	98	113	0.867	1/4 finals
4	Chang–Kim (KOR)	3	0	3	3	0	6	0.000	82	126	0.651	1/4 finals

Source: Results

Date		Score		Set 1	Set 2	Set 3
30 Sep	Tian–Wang (CHN)	2–0	Chang–Kim (KOR)	21–8	21–15	
30 Sep	Pangka–Arlaisuk (THA)	2–0	Rahayu–Nurjanah (INA)	21–16	21–16	
01 Oct	Tian–Wang (CHN)	2–1	Pangka–Arlaisuk (THA)	21–16	25–27	15–8
01 Oct	Rahayu–Nurjanah (INA)	2–0	Chang–Kim (KOR)	21–16	21–13	
02 Oct	Tian–Wang (CHN)	2–0	Rahayu–Nurjanah (INA)	21–13	21–11	
02 Oct	Pangka–Arlaisuk (THA)	2–0	Chang–Kim (KOR)	21–17	21–13	

==== Pool B ====
Pos	Team	Pld	W	L	Pts	SW	SL	SR	SPW	SPL	SPR	Qualification
1	Tokuno–Kusuhara (JPN)	4	4	0	8	8	1	8.000	181	128	1.414	1/4 finals
2	Kulna–Sannok (THA)	4	3	1	7	6	2	3.000	159	120	1.325	1/4 finals
3	Wang–You (CHN)	4	2	2	6	5	4	1.250	169	147	1.150	1/4 finals
4	Lee–Ji (KOR)	4	1	3	5	2	6	0.333	119	148	0.804	1/4 finals
5	Tang–Tong (HKG)	4	0	4	4	0	8	0.000	83	168	0.494	

Source: Results

Date		Score		Set 1	Set 2	Set 3
29 Sep	Kulna–Sannok (THA)	2–0	Tang–Tong (HKG)	21–11	21–8	
29 Sep	Wang–You (CHN)	2–0	Lee–Ji (KOR)	21–13	21–18	
30 Sep	Tokuno–Kusuhara (JPN)	2–0	Lee–Ji (KOR)	21–10	21–11	
30 Sep	Tokuno–Kusuhara (JPN)	2–0	Tang–Tong (HKG)	21–14	21–10	
30 Sep	Kulna–Sannok (THA)	2–0	Wang–You (CHN)	21–14	22–20	
01 Oct	Tang–Tong (HKG)	0–2	Wang–You (CHN)	9–21	9–21	
01 Oct	Tokuno–Kusuhara (JPN)	2–0	Kulna–Sannok (THA)	21–19	21–13	
01 Oct	Lee–Ji (KOR)	2–0	Tang–Tong (HKG)	21–11	21–11	
02 Oct	Tokuno–Kusuhara (JPN)	2–1	Wang–You (CHN)	23–21	17–21	15–9
02 Oct	Kulna–Sannok (THA)	2–0	Lee–Ji (KOR)	21–13	21–12	

=== Knockout round ===
1/4 finals
Tian–Wang (CHN)	21	21
Lee–Ji (KOR)	8	6
Rahayu–Nurjanah (INA)	14	16
Kulna–Sannok (THA)	21	21
Pangka–Arlaisuk (THA)	16	24
Wang–You (CHN)	21	26
Chang–Kim (KOR)	12	14
Tokuno–Kusuhara (JPN)	21	21

Semifinals
Tian–Wang (CHN)	21	21
Kulna–Sannok (THA)	16	18
Wang–You (CHN)	21	24
Tokuno–Kusuhara (JPN)	14	22

Final
Tian–Wang (CHN)	21	21
Wang–You (CHN)	17	13
3rd–4th place
Kulna–Sannok (THA)	18	22
Tokuno–Kusuhara (JPN)	21	24

== Final standing ==
Rank	Team	Pld	W	L
1st place, gold medalist(s)	Tian Jia – Wang Fei (CHN)	6	6	0
2nd place, silver medalist(s)	Wang Lu – You Wenhui (CHN)	7	4	3
3rd place, bronze medalist(s)	Ryoko Tokuno – Chiaki Kusuhara (JPN)	7	6	1
4	Kamoltip Kulna – Jarunee Sannok (THA)	7	4	3
5	Timy Yudhani Rahayu – Siti Nurjanah (INA)	4	1	3
5	Chang Yoon-hee – Kim Yeon (KOR)	4	0	4
5	Lee Mi-soon – Ji Kyung-hee (KOR)	5	1	4
5	Manatsanan Pangka – Rattanaporn Arlaisuk (THA)	4	2	2
9	Tang Ming Mei – Tong Lai Ming (HKG)	4	0	4
