= Beach volleyball at the 2006 Asian Games – Women's tournament =

Women at the 2006 Asian Games
- Venue: Doha Sports City
- Date: 2–11 December 2006
- Competitors: 28 from 10 nations

Medalists
gold medal	Xue Chen; Zhang Xi	China
silver medal	Shinako Tanaka; Eiko Koizumi	Japan
bronze medal	Wang Jie; Tian Jia	China

The women's beach volleyball tournament at the 2006 Asian Games was held from December 2 to December 11, 2006 in Doha, Qatar.

== Schedule ==
All times are Arabia Standard Time (UTC+03:00)

Date	Time	Event
Saturday, 2 December 2006	14:00	Round 1
Sunday, 3 December 2006	17:00	Round 2
Monday, 4 December 2006	19:00	Rank 13
Tuesday, 5 December 2006	17:00	Rank 9
Wednesday, 6 December 2006	18:00	Round 3
Thursday, 7 December 2006	19:00	Rank 7
Saturday, 9 December 2006	16:00	Rank 5
Sunday, 10 December 2006	17:00	Semifinals
Monday, 11 December 2006	16:00	Bronze medal match
Monday, 11 December 2006	18:00	Final

== Results ==
=== Double elimination round ===
==== Round 1 ====
Date		Score		Set 1	Set 2	Set 3
02 Dec	Luk–Beh (MAS)	2–0	Penkina–Dyachenko (KAZ)	21–19	21–10	
02 Dec	Kulna–Sannok (THA)	2–0	Gunawardena–Wijesinghe (SRI)	21–8	21–13	
02 Dec	Aghasy–Aghasy (IRQ)	0–2	Kusuhara–Urata (JPN)	4–21	11–21	
02 Dec	Tanaka–Koizumi (JPN)	2–0	Bayarmaa–Enkhmaa (MGL)	21–5	21–8	
02 Dec	Tse–Kong (HKG)	0–2	Phokongloy–Tenpaksee (THA)	11–21	13–21	
02 Dec	Storozhenko–Alenkina (KAZ)	1–2	Pascua–Ilustre (PHI)	16–21	21–11	15–17

==== Round 2 ====
Date		Score		Set 1	Set 2	Set 3
03 Dec	Wang–Tian (CHN)	2–0	Luk–Beh (MAS)	21–10	21–13	
03 Dec	Kulna–Sannok (THA)	2–1	Kusuhara–Urata (JPN)	19–21	21–17	15–12
03 Dec	Tanaka–Koizumi (JPN)	2–0	Phokongloy–Tenpaksee (THA)	21–13	21–16	
03 Dec	Pascua–Ilustre (PHI)	0–2	Xue–Zhang (CHN)	15–21	18–21	

==== Rank 13 ====
Date		Score		Set 1	Set 2	Set 3
04 Dec	Tse–Kong (HKG)	2–0	Bayarmaa–Enkhmaa (MGL)	21–11	21–11	
04 Dec	Aghasy–Aghasy (IRQ)	0–2	Gunawardena–Wijesinghe (SRI)	5–21	10–21	

==== Rank 9 ====
Date		Score		Set 1	Set 2	Set 3
05 Dec	Storozhenko–Alenkina (KAZ)	1–2	Kusuhara–Urata (JPN)	21–17	19–21	10–15
05 Dec	Tse–Kong (HKG)	0–2	Luk–Beh (MAS)	10–21	24–26	
05 Dec	Gunawardena–Wijesinghe (SRI)	0–2	Pascua–Ilustre (PHI)	12–21	9–21	
05 Dec	Penkina–Dyachenko (KAZ)	0–2	Phokongloy–Tenpaksee (THA)	14–21	4–21	

==== Round 3 ====
Date		Score		Set 1	Set 2	Set 3
06 Dec	Wang–Tian (CHN)	2–0	Kulna–Sannok (THA)	21–11	21–16	
06 Dec	Tanaka–Koizumi (JPN)	2–1	Xue–Zhang (CHN)	22–20	15–21	19–17

==== Rank 7 ====
Date		Score		Set 1	Set 2	Set 3
07 Dec	Kusuhara–Urata (JPN)	2–0	Luk–Beh (MAS)	21–12	21–17	
07 Dec	Pascua–Ilustre (PHI)	0–2	Phokongloy–Tenpaksee (THA)	20–22	13–21	

==== Rank 5 ====
Date		Score		Set 1	Set 2	Set 3
09 Dec	Xue–Zhang (CHN)	2–0	Kusuhara–Urata (JPN)	21–14	21–14	
09 Dec	Kulna–Sannok (THA)	2–0	Phokongloy–Tenpaksee (THA)	21–19	21–11	

=== Knockout round ===
Semifinals
Wang–Tian (CHN)	21	20	10
Xue–Zhang (CHN)	19	22	15
Tanaka–Koizumi (JPN)	26	14	15
Kulna–Sannok (THA)	24	21	13

Final
Xue–Zhang (CHN)	19	21	15
Tanaka–Koizumi (JPN)	21	11	13
Bronze medal match
Wang–Tian (CHN)	21	21
Kulna–Sannok (THA)	12	15

== Final standing ==
Rank	Team	Pld	W	L
1st place, gold medalist(s)	Xue Chen – Zhang Xi (CHN)	5	4	1
2nd place, silver medalist(s)	Shinako Tanaka – Eiko Koizumi (JPN)	5	4	1
3rd place, bronze medalist(s)	Wang Jie – Tian Jia (CHN)	4	3	1
4	Kamoltip Kulna – Jarunee Sannok (THA)	6	3	3
5	Chiaki Kusuhara – Satoko Urata (JPN)	5	3	2
5	Yupa Phokongloy – Usa Tenpaksee (THA)	5	3	2
7	Luk Teck Eng – Beh Shun Thing (MAS)	4	2	2
7	Diane Pascua – Heidi Ilustre (PHI)	4	2	2
9	Tse Wing Hung – Kong Cheuk Yee (HKG)	3	1	2
9	Irina Penkina – Olga Dyachenko (KAZ)	2	0	2
9	Marina Storozhenko – Yelena Alenkina (KAZ)	2	0	2
9	Geethika Gunawardena – Sujeewa Wijesinghe (SRI)	3	1	2
13	Liza Aghasy – Lida Aghasy (IRQ)	2	0	2
13	Tsogtbaataryn Bayarmaa – Yarinpiliin Enkhmaa (MGL)	2	0	2
