= Beach volleyball at the 1998 Asian Games – Women's tournament =

Women at the 1998 Asian Games
- Venue: Jomtien Beach
- Date: 16–19 December 1998
- Competitors: 18 from 5 nations

Medalists
gold medal	Manatsanan Pangka; Rattanaporn Arlaisuk	Thailand
silver medal	Yukiko Takahashi; Mika Saiki	Japan
bronze medal	Ryoko Tokuno; Chiaki Kusuhara	Japan

The women's beach volleyball tournament at the 1998 Asian Games was held from December 16 to December 19, 1998, in Jomtien Beach, Chonburi Province.

== Schedule ==
All times are Indochina Time (UTC+07:00)

Date	Time	Event
Wednesday, 16 December 1998	09:00	Round 1
Wednesday, 16 December 1998	09:00	Round 2
Thursday, 17 December 1998	09:00	Rank 9
Thursday, 17 December 1998	09:00	Round 3
Thursday, 17 December 1998	09:00	Rank 7
Friday, 18 December 1998	09:00	Rank 5
Friday, 18 December 1998	09:00	Semifinals
Saturday, 19 December 1998	09:00	Finals

== Results ==
=== Double elimination round ===
==== Round 1 ====
Date		Score	
16 Dec	Dosdos–Miguel (PHI)	12–15	Marawali–Renjaan (INA)

==== Round 2 ====
Date		Score	
16 Dec	Takahashi–Saiki (JPN)	15–6	Marawali–Renjaan (INA)
16 Dec	Pangka–Arlaisuk (THA)	15–10	Tokuno–Kusuhara (JPN)
16 Dec	Xiong–Chi (CHN)	15–6	Kulna–Katmanee (THA)
16 Dec	Kaize–Nurjanah (INA)	8–15	Liu–Zhang (CHN)

==== Rank 9 ====
Date		Score	
17 Dec	Dosdos–Miguel (PHI)	3–15	Kulna–Katmanee (THA)

==== Round 3 ====
Date		Score	
17 Dec	Takahashi–Saiki (JPN)	16–14	Pangka–Arlaisuk (THA)
17 Dec	Xiong–Chi (CHN)	10–15	Liu–Zhang (CHN)

==== Rank 7 ====
Date		Score	
17 Dec	Marawali–Renjaan (INA)	3–15	Tokuno–Kusuhara (JPN)
17 Dec	Kulna–Katmanee (THA)	15–11	Kaize–Nurjanah (INA)

==== Rank 5 ====
Date		Score	
18 Dec	Xiong–Chi (CHN)	12–15	Tokuno–Kusuhara (JPN)
18 Dec	Pangka–Arlaisuk (THA)	15–12	Kulna–Katmanee (THA)

=== Knockout round ===
Semifinals
Takahashi–Saiki (JPN)	15
Tokuno–Kusuhara (JPN)	2
Liu–Zhang (CHN)	10
Pangka–Arlaisuk (THA)	15

Gold medal match
Takahashi–Saiki (JPN)	5	8
Pangka–Arlaisuk (THA)	12	12
Bronze medal match
Tokuno–Kusuhara (JPN)	15
Liu–Zhang (CHN)	5

== Final standing ==
Rank	Team	Pld	W	L
1st place, gold medalist(s)	Manatsanan Pangka – Rattanaporn Arlaisuk (THA)	5	4	1
2nd place, silver medalist(s)	Yukiko Takahashi – Mika Saiki (JPN)	4	3	1
3rd place, bronze medalist(s)	Ryoko Tokuno – Chiaki Kusuhara (JPN)	5	3	2
4	Liu Chunying – Zhang Jingkun (CHN)	4	2	2
5	Xiong Zi – Chi Rong (CHN)	3	1	2
5	Kamoltip Kulna – Wilaiwan Katmanee (THA)	4	2	2
7	Eta Kaize – Siti Nurjanah (INA)	2	0	2
7	Yohana Marawali – Betty Renjaan (INA)	3	1	2
9	Helen Dosdos – Gina Miguel (PHI)	2	0	2
