= Yanchulova =

Yanchulova is a surname. Notable people with the surname include:

- Petia Yanchulova (born 1978), Bulgarian volleyball player
- Tzvetelina Yanchulova (born 1975), Bulgarian volleyball player, sister of Petia
