= Beach volleyball at the 1998 Asian Games – Men's tournament =

Men at the 1998 Asian Games
- Venue: Jomtien Beach
- Date: 16–19 December 1998
- Competitors: 22 from 9 nations

Medalists
gold medal	Gu Hongyu; Li Hua	China
silver medal	Irilkhun Shofanna; Agus Salim	Indonesia
bronze medal	Anjas Asmara; Iwan Sumoyo	Indonesia

The men's beach volleyball tournament at the 1998 Asian Games was held from December 16 to December 19, 1998 in Jomtien Beach, Chonburi Province.

== Schedule ==
All times are Indochina Time (UTC+07:00)

Date	Time	Event
Wednesday, 16 December 1998	09:00	Round 1
Wednesday, 16 December 1998	09:00	Round 2
Thursday, 17 December 1998	09:00	Rank 9
Thursday, 17 December 1998	09:00	Round 3
Thursday, 17 December 1998	09:00	Rank 7
Friday, 18 December 1998	09:00	Rank 5
Friday, 18 December 1998	09:00	Semifinals
Saturday, 19 December 1998	09:00	Finals

== Results ==
=== Double elimination round ===
==== Round 1 ====
Date		Score	
16 Dec	Toyco–Valdez (PHI)	5–15	Mut–Um (CAM)
16 Dec	Chow–Kwan (HKG)	5–15	Asmara–Sumoyo (INA)
16 Dec	Bonyadi–Hosseinpour (IRI)	15–3	Mashebin–Aristarkhov (KAZ)

==== Round 2 ====
Date		Score	
16 Dec	Noguchi–Morikawa (JPN)	15–2	Mut–Um (CAM)
16 Dec	Shofanna–Salim (INA)	15–6	Naktamna–Phoseeta (THA)
16 Dec	Gu–Li (CHN)	9–15	Asmara–Sumoyo (INA)
16 Dec	Bonyadi–Hosseinpour (IRI)	5–15	Thongkamnerd–Sawangreung (THA)

==== Rank 9 ====
Date		Score	
17 Dec	Mashebin–Aristarkhov (KAZ)	8–15	Naktamna–Phoseeta (THA)
17 Dec	Chow–Kwan (HKG)	10–15	Mut–Um (CAM)
17 Dec	Toyco–Valdez (PHI)	1–15	Gu–Li (CHN)

==== Round 3 ====
Date		Score	
17 Dec	Noguchi–Morikawa (JPN)	12–15	Shofanna–Salim (INA)
17 Dec	Asmara–Sumoyo (INA)	11–15	Thongkamnerd–Sawangreung (THA)

==== Rank 7 ====
Date		Score	
17 Dec	Naktamna–Phoseeta (THA)	15–7	Mut–Um (CAM)
17 Dec	Gu–Li (CHN)	15–7	Bonyadi–Hosseinpour (IRI)

==== Rank 5 ====
Date		Score	
18 Dec	Asmara–Sumoyo (INA)	15–12	Naktamna–Phoseeta (THA)
18 Dec	Noguchi–Morikawa (JPN)	12–15	Gu–Li (CHN)

=== Knockout round ===
Semifinals
Shofanna–Salim (INA)	15
Asmara–Sumoyo (INA)	2
Thongkamnerd–Sawangreung (THA)	14
Gu–Li (CHN)	16

Gold medal match
Shofanna–Salim (INA)	12	10	7
Gu–Li (CHN)	1	12	12
Bronze medal match
Asmara–Sumoyo (INA)	15
Thongkamnerd–Sawangreung (THA)	13

== Final standing ==
Rank	Team	Pld	W	L
1st place, gold medalist(s)	Gu Hongyu – Li Hua (CHN)	6	5	1
2nd place, silver medalist(s)	Irilkhun Shofanna – Agus Salim (INA)	4	3	1
3rd place, bronze medalist(s)	Anjas Asmara – Iwan Sumoyo (INA)	6	4	2
4	Thawip Thongkamnerd – Sataporn Sawangreung (THA)	4	2	2
5	Takuya Noguchi – Taichi Morikawa (JPN)	3	1	2
5	Sudjai Naktamna – Suntorn Phoseeta (THA)	4	2	2
7	Mut Savet – Um Sok (CAM)	4	2	2
7	Reza Bonyadi – Ebrahim Hosseinpour (IRI)	3	1	2
9	Chow Kwok Wai – Kwan Wing Sang (HKG)	2	0	2
9	Yevgeniy Mashebin – Oleg Aristarkhov (KAZ)	2	0	2
9	Leonardo Toyco – Elmer Valdez (PHI)	2	0	2
