= Xiong Zi =

Xiong Zi may refer to:

- King Wen of Chu (died 677 BC)
- Xiong Zi (volleyball) (born 1976)
