= Seike =

Seike (written: 清家) is a Japanese surname. Notable people with the surname include:

- Kiko Seike (清家 貴子, born 1996), Japanese women's footballer
- Rii Seike (清家 ちえ, born 1974), Japanese beach volleyball player
