= Pauline Manser =

Australian beach and indoor volleyball player

Personal information
- Born: 2 February 1969 (age 57) Mount Gambier, South Australia
- Height: 181 cm (71 in)

Sport
- Country: Australia
- Sport: Beach volleyball

Pauline Manser (born 2 February 1969 in Mount Gambier, South Australia) is an Australian volleyball coach and former professional beach volleyball and indoor volleyball player.

== Career ==
Playing indoor volleyball Manser represented Australia 104 times between 1987 and 1996. She was one of the inaugural inductees to the Australian Volleyball Hall of Fame in 2012 in recognition of her indoor volleyball career.

Manser competed in the women's tournament of the 2000 Summer Olympics alongside Tania Gooley. They finished fifth.

Prior to teaming up with Gooley in August 1999, Manser had played alongside Kerri Pottharst from March 1998. She began her international competitive career alongside Liane Fenwick in 1997.

From 2010 to 2014 Manser was coach of the Australian women's national volleyball team. In 2015 she was appointed assistant coach to the Lobos team at the University of New Mexico.
