= Sarah Straton =

Australian beach volleyball player

Personal information
- Born: October 6, 1970 (age 55) Minneapolis, Minnesota, United States of America
- Height: 188 cm (74 in)

Sport
- Country: Australia
- Sport: Beach volleyball

Sarah Straton (born October 6, 1970, in Minneapolis, Minnesota, United States of America) is a former professional beach volleyball player who represented Australia at the Sydney 2000 Olympic Games. She is married to Greg Noyes, has a son and a daughter and lives in Redondo Beach, California.

Straton graduated from the University of Western Australia in 1992 with a degree in human movement and exercise science.

== Career ==
She represented Australia on the FIVB tour from 1995 to 2003. She played alongside Chris Wilson, her major partner from 1995 to 1998. She also played alongside Tania Gooley, Liane Fenwick, Debbie Brand and Angie Akers. Straton competed in the women's tournament of the 2000 Summer Olympics alongside Annette Huygens Tholen, finishing 19th. From 2001 to 2010 she competed in AVP tour events. Following her retirement from competition, she became a volunteer coach of beach volleyball with UCLA in 2014.

Straton founded and runs Evergrowing, which holds parenting and sports workshops to help parents relate to their children, respond to their needs and support their enjoyment of sport.
