= Rigaux =

Rigaux is a surname. Notable people with the surname include:

- Aurélien Rigaux (born 1988), French basketball player
- Cécile Rigaux (born 1969), French beach volleyball player
- Fernand Rigaux (1905–1962), Belgian astronomer
- Jean Rigaux (1909–1991), French songwriter and actor
