= Teresa Galindo =

Mexican beach volleyball player (born 1970)

Personal information
- Born: 12 November 1970 (age 54); Mexico City, Mexico

Sport
- Sport: Beach volleyball

Teresa Galindo (born 12 November 1970) is a Mexican beach volleyball player. She competed in the women's tournament at the 2000 Summer Olympics.
