= Cristina Pereira =

Portuguese beach volleyball player (1968–2009)

Personal information
- Nationality: Portuguese
- Born: 8 March 1968
- Died: 30 October 2009 (aged 41)

Sport
- Sport: Beach volleyball

Cristina Pereira (8 March 1968 – 30 October 2009) was a Portuguese beach volleyball player. She competed in the women's tournament at the 2000 Summer Olympics.
