= Sachiko Fujita =

Japanese volleyball player (born 1968)

Personal information
- Born: 9 January 1968 (age 58); Tokyo, Tokyo, Japan
- Height: 1.73 m (5 ft 8 in)

Volleyball information
- Number: 12

National team
1987–1988	Japan

Sachiko Fujita (Japanese: 藤田 幸子; born 9 January 1968) is a Japanese former volleyball and beach volleyball player who competed in the 1988 and in the 1996 Summer Olympics.

In 1988, she finished third with the Japanese team in the Olympic tournament in Seoul.

Eight years later, she finished fifth with her partner Yukiko Takahashi in the beach volleyball tournament at the 1996 Summer Olympics in Atlanta.
