= Maike Friedrichsen =

German beach volleyball player (born 1970)

Personal information
- Nationality: German
- Born: 18 July 1970 (age 55); Eutin, West Germany
- Height: 5 ft 11 in (180 cm)

Sport
- Sport: Beach volleyball

Maike Friedrichsen (born 18 July 1970) is a German former beach volleyball player. She competed in the women's tournament at the 2000 Summer Olympics.
