= Tania Gooley-Humphry =

Australian beach and indoor volleyball player

Personal information
- Born: Tania Gooley; 16 August 1973 (age 52) Adelaide, South Australia
- Height: 177 cm (70 in)

Sport
- Country: Australia
- Sport: Indoor volleyball, beach volleyball

Tania Gooley-Humphry (born 16 August 1973 in Adelaide, South Australia) is an Australian former professional beach volleyball and indoor volleyball player.

Gooley-Humphry began her indoor volleyball career at the University of New Mexico in 1991.

Prior to teaming up with Manser in August 1999, Gooley-Humphry had played alongside Nicole Sanderson from mid 1998. She began her international competitive beach volleyball career alongside Sarah Straton in 1996.

Gooley-Humphry competed in the women's tournament of the 2000 Summer Olympics alongside Pauline Manser. They finished fifth.

From 2002 she competed alongside Angela Clarke in a number of international grand slam and open competitions.

She is married with two daughters.
