= Yukiko Ishizaka =

Japanese beach volleyball player (born 1968)

Yukiko Ishizaka OLY
Personal information
- Nationality: Japanese
- Born: 14 March 1968 (age 58) Chigasaki, Japan

Sport
- Sport: Beach volleyball

Yukiko Ishizaka (石坂 有紀子, Ishizaka Yukiko; born 14 March 1968) is a Japanese beach volleyball player. She competed at the 1996 Summer Olympics and the 2000 Summer Olympics.
