= Petia Yanchulova =

Bulgarian beach volleyball player (born 1978)

Personal information
- Nationality: Bulgaria
- Born: July 3, 1978 (age 48); Sofia, Bulgaria
- Hometown: San Diego, California, United States
- Height: 1.78 m (5 ft 10 in)
- Weight: 65 kg (143 lb)

Beach volleyball information
Years	Teammate
1998–2006; 2007–2008	Tzvetelina Yanchulova; Evelina Tcholakova

Petia Yanchulova (Bulgarian: Петя Янчулова; born July 3, 1978, in Sofia) is a Bulgarian beach volleyball player and astrophysicist. She represented her nation Bulgaria in two editions of the Olympic Games (2000 and 2004), along with her partner and elder sister Tzvetelina. Despite being born in Bulgaria, Yanchulova trained most of her sporting career in San Diego, California, United States, playing for the University of San Diego's volleyball team.

Yanchulova began her sporting career at the University of San Diego in San Diego, California, where she competed for the San Diego Toreros volleyball team. While playing for the Toreros, she led her team to two impressive victories at the West Coast Conference Championships, and was also named the Defender of the Year in 1999 because of her tremendous impact to the university's volleyball program. Petia was named to the First Team All-American team (together with Misty May and Kerri Walsh) for two years in a row in 1998 and 1999. Petia was also honored in the San Diego Hall of Champions and was induced in the West Coast Conference Hall of Fame for her outstanding accomplishments at the University of San Diego.

Since 1998, Yanchulova competed professionally at the FIVB World Tour along with her sister Tzvetelina. The Bulgarian tandem also made their official debut at the 2000 Summer Olympics in Sydney, where they both placed seventeenth in the women's beach volleyball, defeating European bronze medalists Deborah and Rebekka Kadijk along the way. Four years later, at the 2004 Summer Olympics in Athens, the Yanchulova sisters qualified for their second Olympics in the same tournament by obtaining their berth from the FIVB Grand Slam Series in Klagenfurt, Austria. This time, defeating the reigning European Champions of Germany in pool play, the sisters advanced to the Round of 16, eventually losing in a dramatic battle against eventual Olympic silver medalists of Brazil, Adriana Behar and Shelda Bede and placing 9th overall. When her elder sister retired from the sport in 2007, Yanchulova went on to play indoor volleyball professionally in Europe from 2008 to 2009.

After retiring from professional volleyball, Yanchulova received her Ph.D in astrophysics in 2020 from the University of California, San Diego. Following her graduation, she has been a Fulbright Scholar and postdoctoral researcher in various fields in astrophysics, and currently researches and teaches at Sofia University in Bulgaria.
