= Tzvetelina Yanchulova =

Bulgarian beach volleyball player

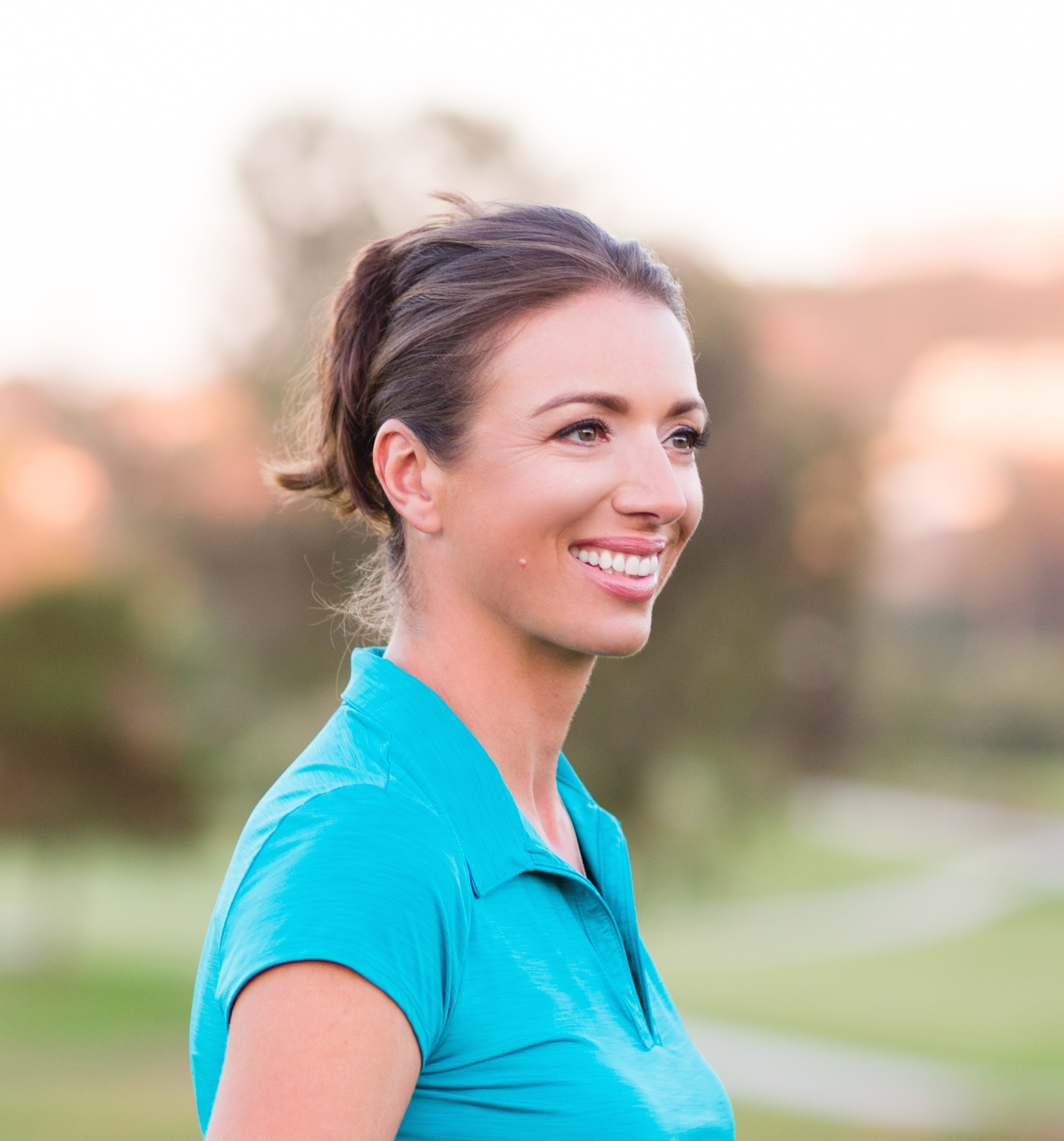
- Lina Taylor

Personal information
- Full name: Tzvetelina Yanchulova Taylor
- Nickname: Lina
- Nationality: Bulgaria
- Born: April 12, 1975 (age 51) Sofia, Bulgaria
- Home town: San Diego, California, United States
- Height: 1.80 m (5 ft 11 in)
- Weight: 65 kg (143 lb)
Beach volleyball information
- Years: Teammate
- 1998–2006: Petia Yanchulova

Tzvetelina "Lina" Yanchulova (Bulgarian: Цветелина "Лина" Янчулова; born April 12, 1975, in Sofia), also known as Lina Taylor, is a Bulgarian beach volleyball player. She represented her nation Bulgaria in two editions of the Olympic Games (2000 and 2004), along with her partner and younger sister Petia. As a junior player in her native Bulgaria, Yanchulova became a four-time National Champion with her club Levski. She trained for most of her beach volleyball sporting career in San Diego, California, United States, while directing and coaching at Coast Volleyball Club.

Yanchulova began her collegiate sporting career in 1992 at the University of Idaho in Moscow, Idaho, where she competed for the Idaho Vandals women's volleyball team. Crediting her parents, Ted and Nina, for instilling the qualities necessary for success at the highest level, Lina went on to achieve outstanding accomplishments in both indoor and beach volleyball. While playing for the Vandals, she led her team to four impressive victories at the Big Sky Conference Championships, being named Freshman of the Year, Academic All-American, and Player of the Year in 1996.

Since 1998, Yanchulova competed professionally at the FIVB World Tour along with her sister Petia. The Bulgarian tandem also made their official debut at the 2000 Summer Olympics in Sydney, where they both placed seventeenth in the women's beach volleyball, defeating European bronze medalists Deborah and Rebekka Kadijk along the way. Four years later, at the 2004 Summer Olympics in Athens, the Yanchulova sisters qualified for their second Olympic Games in the same tournament by obtaining their berth from the FIVB Grand Slam Series in Klagenfurt, Austria. Defeating the reigning European Champions of Germany in the pool round, the Yanchulova sisters advanced to the round of 16, but they were eventually eliminated in a dramatic battle against eventual Olympic silver medalists Adriana Behar and Shelda Bede of Brazil, placing ninth overall.

== Personal life ==
Lina took the last name Taylor after marrying former NFL player Aaron Taylor. They live in San Diego, California, with their three children.

Currently, Lina Taylor is a speaker on resilience and an ICF-certified executive coach (LinaTaylor.com).

Lina Taylor is the founder of ClimateExecutiveCoaching.com, accelerating results for climate action leaders and teams through science-based, solution-focused, professional coaching.
