= Annette Huygens Tholen =

Australian beach volleyball player

Personal information
- Nationality: Australian
- Born: 1 January 1966 (age 59); Brisbane, Queensland
- Height: 1.69 m (5 ft 7 in)
- Weight: 67 kg (148 lb)

Sport
- Country: Australia
- Sport: Beach volleyball

Annette Huygens Tholen (born 1 January 1966 in Brisbane, Queensland), currently known as Annette Lynch, is an Australian beach volleyball player. She competed in the women's tournament in the 2000 Summer Olympics.
