= Anabelle Prawerman =

French beach volleyball player (born 1963)

Personal information
- Nationality: French
- Born: 13 January 1963 (age 63) Paris, France
Medal record
Women's volleyball
Representing France
European Championships
| Silver medal – second place | 1999 Palma de Mallorca | Beach |

Anabelle Prawerman (born 13 January 1963) is a former female beach volleyball player from France, who twice represented France at the Summer Olympics: 1996 and 2000. Partnering Cécile Rigaux she won the silver medal at the 1999 European Championships.

== Playing partners ==
- Brigitte Lesage
- Cécile Rigaux
