= Chi Rong =

Chinese beach volleyball player (born 1976)

Personal information
- Nationality: Chinese
- Born: 26 July 1976 (age 49); Sichuan, China

Sport
- Sport: Beach volleyball

Chi Rong (born 26 July 1976) is a Chinese beach volleyball player. She competed in the women's tournament at the 2000 Summer Olympics.
