= Yukiko Takahashi =

Japanese volleyball player

Personal information
- Born: 12 November 1967 (age 58) Suzaka, Nagano, Japan
- Height: 1.68 m (5 ft 6 in)

Volleyball information
- Position: Setter
- Number: 11 (1988); 6 (1992)

National team
- Years: Team
- 1987–1992: Japan
Medal record
Women's beach volleyball
Representing Japan
Asian Games
Silver medal – second place	1998 Bangkok	Beach

Yukiko Takahashi OLY (Japanese: 高橋 有紀子; born 12 November 1967) is a Japanese former volleyball and beach volleyball player who competed in the 1988, 1992, 1996, and the 2000 Summer Olympics.

In 1988, Takahashi finished fourth with the Japanese national team in the Olympic tournament in Seoul.

Four years later, Takahashi finished fifth with the Japanese national team in the 1992 Olympic tournament in Barcelona.

== Beach volleyball ==
Takahashi finished fifth with her partner Sachiko Fujita in the 1996 Olympic beach volleyball tournament in Atlanta.

Her last Olympic appearance was in 2000, when she finished fourth with Mika Saiki in the beach volleyball tournament in Sydney.
