= Xiong Zi (volleyball) =

Chinese volleyball player (born 1979)

Personal information
- Nationality: Chinese
- Born: 8 November 1976 (age 49)
- Home town: Beijing
- Height: 181 cm (71 in)
- Weight: 65 kg (143 lb)
- Spike: 310 cm (122 in)
- Block: 300 cm (118 in)

Volleyball information
- Current club: Sichuan

National team
- Years: Team
- 2002: China

Chinese name
- Chinese: 熊姿
- Hanyu Pinyin: Xióng Zī

Xiong Zi (born 8 November 1976) is a Chinese female volleyball player, playing as an outside hitter. She was part of the China women's national volleyball team.

She participated in the 2002 FIVB Volleyball Women's World Championship. She won the gold medal at the 2002 Asian Games. She competed in Beach Volleyball, at the 2000 Summer Olympics.

On club level she played for Sichuan in 2002.
