= Eta Kaize =

Indonesian beach volleyball player (1974–2025)

Personal information
- Full name: Engel Berta Kaize
- Nationality: Indonesian
- Born: 5 July 1974
- Died: 27 December 2025 (aged 51) Merauke, Indonesia

Sport
- Sport: Beach volleyball

Eta Kaize was an Indonesian beach volleyball player. She competed in the women's tournament at the 1996 Summer Olympics.

She died on 27 December 2025 due to an illness and was given honorary funeral by Merauke Police Department.
