= Cécile Rigaux =

French beach volleyball player (born 1969)

Personal information
- Nickname: Cécile Rigaux
- Nationality: French
- Born: 20 April 1969 (age 57) Nogent sur Marne, France
Medal record
Women's volleyball
Representing France
European Championships
Silver medal – second place	1999 Palma de Mallorca	Beach

Cécile Rigaux (born 20 April 1969 in Nogent sur Marne) is a former female beach volleyball player from France, who represented her native country at the 2000 Summer Olympics. Partnering Anabelle Prawerman she claimed the silver medal at the 1999 European Championships.

== Playing partners ==
- Arcadia Berjonneau
- Anabelle Prawerman
- Marie Tari
