= Rii Seike =

Japanese beach volleyball player (born 1974)

Personal information
- Nationality: Japanese
- Born: 4 May 1974 (age 52) Imabari, Ehime, Japan

Sport
- Sport: Beach volleyball

Chie "Rii" Seike (清家 ちえ, Seike Chie; born 4 May 1974) is a Japanese former beach volleyball player. She competed in the women's tournament at the 2000 Summer Olympics.
