= Ji Kyung-hee =

South Korean volleyball player (born 1967)

Personal information
- Nationality: South Korean
- Born: 18 May 1967 (age 58)

Sport
- Sport: Volleyball

Ji Kyung-hee (born 18 May 1967) is a South Korean volleyball player. She competed in the women's tournament at the 1988 Summer Olympics.
