= Wang Jie (beach volleyball) =

Chinese beach volleyball player (born 1983)

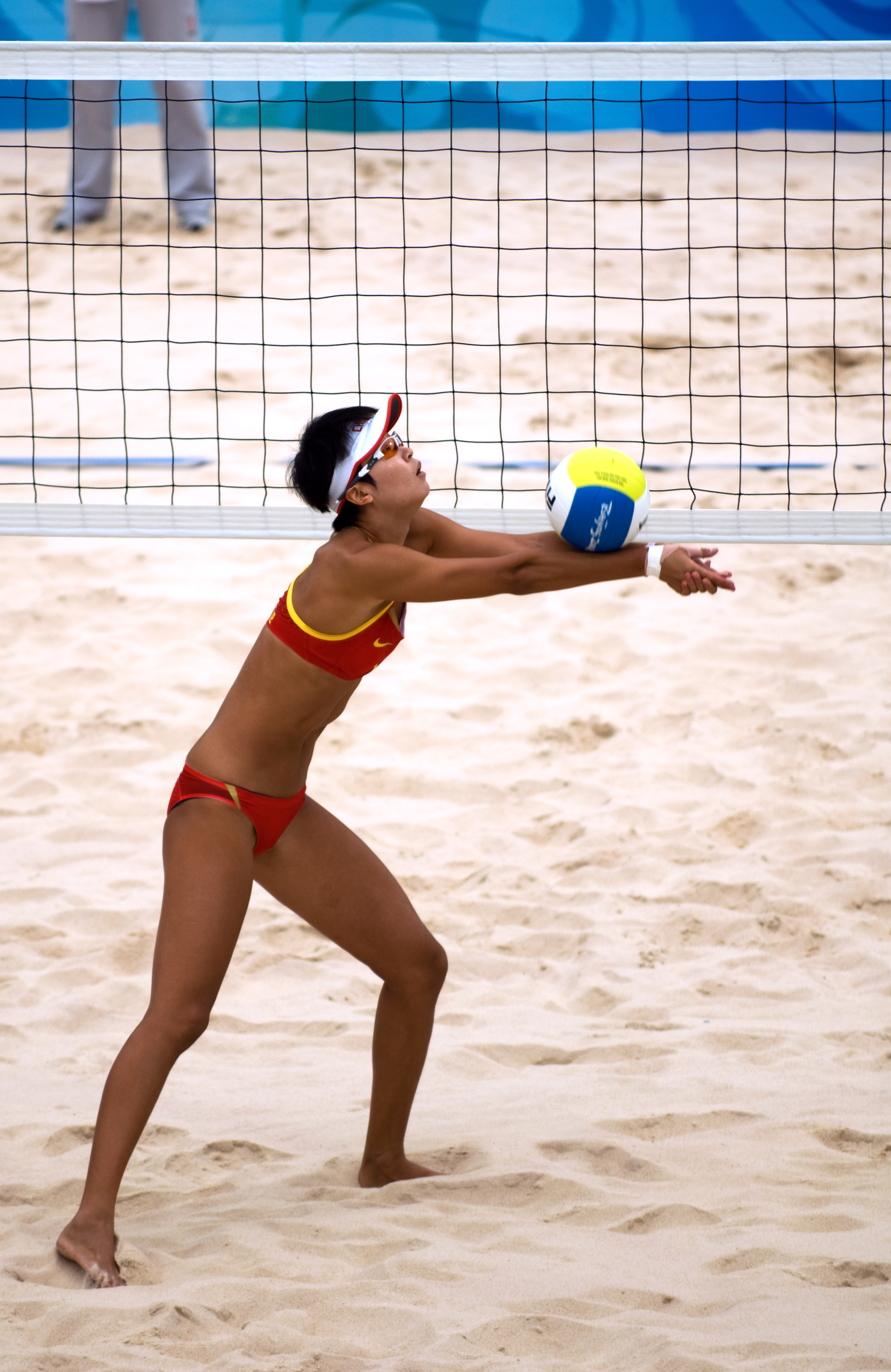
- Wang at the 2008 Summer Olympics

Personal information
- Born: 4 December 1983 (age 42) Ili, Xinjiang, China
- Height: 187 cm (6 ft 2 in)
Honours
Women's beach volleyball
Representing China
Olympic Games
Silver medal – second place	2008 Beijing	Beach
World Championships
Silver medal – second place	2007 Gstaad	Beach
Asian Games
Bronze medal – third place	2006 Doha	Beach

Wang Jie (simplified Chinese: 王洁; traditional Chinese: 王潔; pinyin: Wáng Jié; born 4 December 1983) is a Chinese former beach volleyball player. Along with Tian Jia, she won the silver medal at the women's beach volleyball competition of the 2008 Summer Olympics.

== Career ==
Wang has partnered with Tian Jia since the start of the 2006 season and they were fifth in the world rankings. She won four titles with Tian, most recently in Hong Kong in 2007. The other two came in back-to-back events in Austria and Poland in 2006, and in Shanghai in 2007. A very consistent tandem, the duo has made 15 podium finishes in addition to those four victories, finishing runner-up seven times in 2007 and eight overall, finishing atop the FIVB standings in 2007.

Wang had originally partnered with Linjun Ji upon entering the FIVB circuit in 2003, but made only three top-10 finishes, highlighted by a fifth-place finish in her debut in Greece in 2003, and did not return to beach volleyball until partnering with Tian.

She competed for China at the 2008 Summer Olympics with Tian. They were undefeated up to the finals where they lost against Misty May-Treanor and Kerri Walsh Jennings of the United States, winning the silver medal.

== Sponsors ==
- Swatch

== See also ==
- China at the 2008 Summer Olympics
