= Kerri Pottharst =

Australian volleyball player (born 1965)

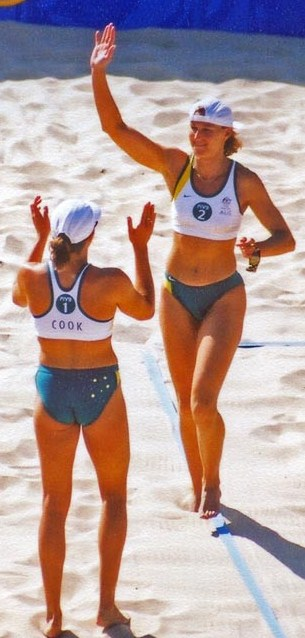
- Pottharst (right) and Natalie Cook

Personal information
- Full name: Kerri Ann Pottharst
- Born: 25 June 1965 (age 61) Adelaide, South Australia, Australia
Honours
Women's beach volleyball
Representing Australia
Olympic Games
Gold medal – first place	2000 Sydney	Beach
Bronze medal – third place	1996 Atlanta	Beach

Kerri Ann Pottharst OAM (born 25 June 1965) is an Australian former professional beach volleyball player and Olympic gold medallist.

Pottharst was born in Adelaide, South Australia, and currently resides in Sydney. In addition to her previous volleyball commitments, Pottharst is an accomplished speaker, MC and presenter. She runs corporate team-building programs, and commentates Indoor and Beach Volleyball. She also founded "The Athlete Story" - a speaker training business.

== Sporting career ==
Pottharst began playing indoor volleyball in 1982 and by 1990 was recognised as one of the best volleyball players in Australia. A serious knee injury in 1992 forced her off the hard court and she began playing beach volleyball.

She partnered with Natalie Cook, and together they represented Australia at the Atlanta Olympics in 1996, winning a bronze medal—the very first time that beach volleyball had been an Olympic sport. In the same year, the pair won a silver medal at the world championships and came first in the World Tour Event in Japan.

Cook and Pottharst split for a few years afterwards, but they reunited in time for the Sydney Olympics. Before the games, they finished third in the World Tour Events in France and Portugal. At the Games themselves, the pair dominated the competition, taking out the gold medal. In the aftermath of their Olympic win, the pair were awarded the Order of Australia, Australia's highest honor. Cook and Pottharst were included in the Fédération Internationale de Volleyball's Team of the Decade.

After the 2000 Olympics, Pottharst retired, but she decided to come out of retirement and return to competition until she suffered a career-ending knee injury. According to worldwide beach volleyball statistics, Pottharst had never been outside of the top 10 and rarely outside of the top six in International Beach Volleyball events since 1994 until her final retirement in 2003.

Pottharst appeared on the Nine Network's TV reality show Celebrity Circus in 2005, in which she trained with stars of Australia's Silvers Circus.
