= Eiko Koizumi =

Japanese beach volleyball player (born 1973)

Medal record

Women's volleyball

Representing Japan

Asian Games
Silver medal – second place	2006 Doha	Beach volleyball

Eiko Koizumi (小泉 栄子, Koizumi Eiko; born September 1, 1973 in Hyougo) is a beach volleyball player from Japan. She won the silver medal in the women's team competition at the 2006 Asian Games in Doha, partnering compatriot Shinako Tanaka. In the final the couple lost (1-2) to the Chinese pair Xue Chen and Zhang Xi.

== Playing partners ==
- Shinako Tanaka
- Rii Seike
- Kanako Nishimura
- Ayako Inoue
