= Zhang Jingkun =

Chinese beach volleyball player (born 1973)

Personal information
- Nationality: Chinese
- Born: 7 March 1973 (age 52)

Sport
- Sport: Beach volleyball

Zhang Jingkun (born 7 March 1973) is a Chinese beach volleyball player. She competed in the women's tournament at the 2000 Summer Olympics.
