= Li Hua (beach volleyball) =

Chinese beach volleyball player (born 1977)

Personal information
- Born: April 29, 1977 (age 49); Shanghai, China
Medal record
Men's beach volleyball
Representing China
Asian Games
Gold medal – first place	1998 Bangkok	Beach
Bronze medal – third place	2002 Busan	Beach

Li Hua (Chinese: 李华; Chinese: 李華; pinyin: Lǐ Huá; born April 29, 1977, in Shanghai) is a male beach volleyball player from PR China, who won a medal twice in the men's team competition at the Asian Games, partnering compatriots Gu Hongyu (Bangkok, gold) and Zhao Chicheng (Busan, bronze).

== Playing partners ==
- Li Ting
- Zhao Chicheng
- Gu Hongyu
- Li Jialu
