= Shinako Tanaka =

Japanese volleyball player (born 1975)

Medal record

Women's volleyball

Representing Japan

Asian Games
Silver medal – second place	2006 Doha	Beach Volleyball

Shinako Tanaka (田中 姿子, Tanaka Shinako; born July 28, 1975, in Saitama) is a female beach volleyball player from Japan, who won the silver medal in the women's team competition at the 2006 Asian Games in Doha, partnering compatriot Eiko Koizumi. In the final the couple lost (1–2) to the Chinese pair Xue Chen and Zhang Xi. Tanaka started her sports career in indoor volleyball, and played for the Women's National Team.

== Playing partners ==
- Eiko Koizumi
- Miho Makabe
- Sanae Tsubakimoto
- Miwa Asao
- Mika Teru Saiki
