= Gu Hongyu =

Chinese beach volleyball player (born 1971)

Personal information
- Born: January 31, 1971 (age 55); Beijing, China
Honours
Men's beach volleyball
Representing China
Asian Games
Gold medal – first place	1998 Bangkok	Beach

Gu Hongyu (simplified Chinese: 辜轰余; traditional Chinese: 辜轟餘; pinyin: Gū Hōngyú; born January 31, 1971, in Beijing) is a retired male beach volleyball player from the People's Republic of China. He won the gold medal in the men's team competition at the 1998 Asian Games, partnering compatriot Li Hua.

== Playing partners ==
- Li Hua
