= Ryoko Tokuno =

Japanese beach volleyball player (born 1974)

Personal information
- Nationality: Japan
- Born: 27 August 1974 (age 52); Matsuyama, Japan
- Height: 1.68 m (5 ft 6 in)
- Weight: 60 kg (132 lb)
Medal record
Women's beach volleyball
Representing Japan
Asian Games
Bronze medal – third place	1998 Bangkok	Women
Bronze medal – third place	2002 Busan	Women

Ryoko Tokuno (徳野 涼子, Tokuno Ryōko; born 27 August 1974 in Matsuyama, Ehime) is a Japanese beach volleyball player.

Tokuno competed at the FIVB Beach Volleyball World Tour between 1997 and 2005. In 2004 she qualified to the Summer Olympics, in Athens, alongside your long-time partner Chiaki Kusuhara. They won only one of the three matches in the group stage and did not advance to the medal round.
