= You Wenhui =

Chinese beach volleyball player

Personal information
- Born: October 20, 1979 (age 47); Shanghai
Honours
Women's beach volleyball
Representing China
Asian Games
Silver medal – second place	2002 Busan	Beach

You Wenhui (Chinese: 尤文慧; pinyin: Yóu Wénhuì; born October 20, 1979, in Shanghai) is a female Chinese beach volleyball player who competed in the 2004 Summer Olympics.

In 2004 she was eliminated with her teammate Wang Lu in the first round of the women's beach volleyball competition.
