= Wang Lu (beach volleyball) =

Chinese beach volleyball player

Personal information
- Born: August 8, 1982 (age 44); Taiyuan, Shanxi, China
Honours
Women's beach volleyball
Representing China
Asian Games
Silver medal – second place	2002 Busan	Beach

Wang Lu (Chinese: 王露; pinyin: Wáng Lù; born August 8, 1982, in Taiyuan, Shanxi) is a female Chinese beach volleyball player who competed in the 2004 Summer Olympics.

In 2004, she was eliminated with her teammate You Wenhui in the first round of the women's beach volleyball competition.
