= Wang Fei (beach volleyball) =

Chinese beach volleyball player (born 1981)

Personal information
- Born: 6 August 1981 (age 45); Henan, China
Honours
Women's beach volleyball
Representing China
World Championships
Bronze medal – third place	2005 Berlin	Beach
Asian Games
Gold medal – first place	2002 Busan	Beach

Wang Fei (Chinese: 王菲; pinyin: Wáng Fēi; born 6 August 1981 in Henan) is a female Chinese beach volleyball player, who won the bronze medal in the women's beach team competition at the 2005 Beach Volleyball World Championships in Berlin, Germany, partnering Tian Jia. She first represented her country at the 2016 Summer Olympics in Rio, Brazil.
