= Mika Saiki =

Japanese volleyball player (born 1972)

Personal information
- Nickname: Teru
- Born: September 25, 1972 (age 54); Matsuyama, Ehime, Japan
- Height: 1.72 m (5 ft 8 in)
- Weight: 63 kg (139 lb)

Beach volleyball information

Current teammate
Teammate
Chiaki Kusuhara

Indoor volleyball information
- Number: 11

National team
| 1995–1996 | Japan |
Medal record
Women's beach volleyball
Representing Japan
Asian Games
| Silver medal – second place | 1998 Bangkok | Beach |

Mika Saiki (佐伯 美香, Saiki Mika; born September 25, 1972) is a retired Japanese beach volleyball and indoor volleyball player.

Saiki competed at the 1996 Summer Olympics in Atlanta in volleyball. She then competed at the 2000 Summer Olympics in Sydney and the 2008 Summer Olympics in Beijing in beach volleyball.
