= Tian Jia =

Chinese beach volleyball player (born 1981)

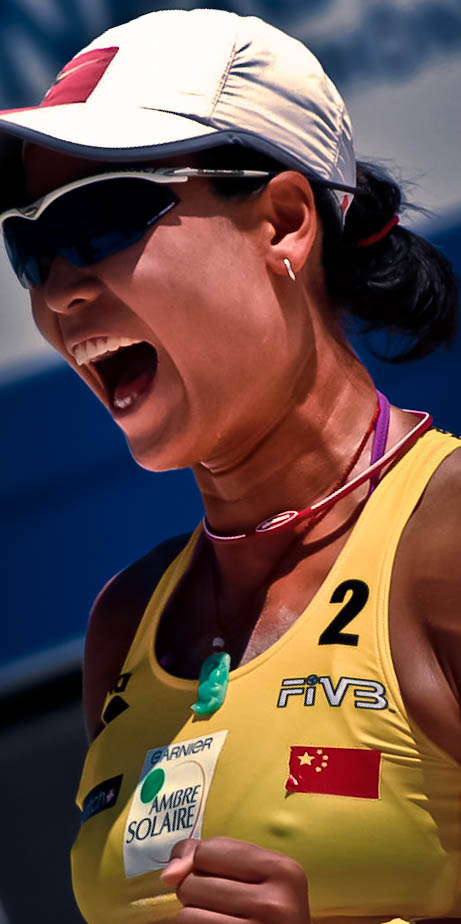

Personal information
- Born: 9 February 1981 (age 45)
- Hometown: Tianjin, China
- Height: 178 cm (5 ft 10 in)
Honours
Women's beach volleyball
Representing China
Olympic Games
Silver medal – second place	2008 Beijing	Beach
World Championships
Silver medal – second place	2007 Gstaad	Beach
Bronze medal – third place	2005 Berlin	Beach
Asian Games
Gold medal – first place	2002 Busan	Beach
Bronze medal – third place	2006 Doha	Beach

Tian Jia (Chinese: 田佳; pinyin: Tián Jia; born 9 February 1981 in Tianjin) is a female Chinese professional beach volleyball player.

== Career ==
Tian won the bronze medal in the women's team competition at the 2005 Beach Volleyball World Championships in Berlin, Germany, partnering Wang Fei. She competed at the Sydney 2000 and the Athens 2004 Games.

At the 2008 Summer Olympics in Beijing, Tian and her partner Wang Jie won the silver medal in the women's beach volleyball competition, going undefeated until losing in the final to Misty May-Treanor and Kerri Walsh of the United States.

== Sponsors ==
Swatch
