= Chiaki Kusuhara =

Japanese beach volleyball player (born 1975)

Personal information
- Nationality: Japanese
- Born: 1 November 1975 (age 50); Matsuyama, Ehime, Japan
- Height: 5 ft 9 in (175 cm)
Medal record
Women's beach volleyball
Representing Japan
Asian Games
Bronze medal – third place	1998 Bangkok	Women
Bronze medal – third place	2002 Busan	Women

Chiaki Kusuhara (楠原千秋, Kusuhara Chiaki; born 1 November 1975 in Matsuyama, Ehime) is a retired Japanese Olympic beach volleyballer. She competed at the 2008 Summer Olympics and was partnered with Mika Teru Saiki.
